= 2016–17 ISU World Standings =

Merit-based ice skating ranking

2016–17 ISU World Standings and Season's World Ranking
Season-end No. 1 skaters
- Men's singles: (Japan) Yuzuru Hanyu
- Ladies' singles: (Russia) Evgenia Medvedeva
- Pairs: (Canada) Meagan Duhamel / Eric Radford
- Ice dance: (United States) Madison Chock / Evan Bates

Season's No. 1 skaters
- Men's singles: (Japan) Yuzuru Hanyu
- Ladies' singles: (Russia) Evgenia Medvedeva
- Pairs: (Russia) Evgenia Tarasova / Vladimir Morozov
- Ice dance: (Canada) Tessa Virtue / Scott Moir

Season-end No. 1 teams
- Senior Synchronized: (Russia) Team Paradise
- Junior Synchronized: (United States) Team Skyliners Junior

Navigation

The 2016–17 ISU World Standings and Season's World Ranking, are the World Standings and Season's World Ranking published by the International Skating Union (ISU) during the 2016–17 season.

The 2016–17 ISU World Standings for single & pair skating and ice dance, are taking into account results of the 2014–15, 2015–16 and 2016–17 seasons.

The 2016–17 ISU World standings for synchronized skating, are based on the results of the 2014–15, 2015–16 and 2016–17 seasons.

== World Standings for single & pair skating and ice dance ==
=== Season-end standings ===
The remainder of this section is a complete list, by discipline, published by the ISU.

==== Men's singles (209 skaters) ====
As of 1 April 2017

Rank	Nation	Skater	Points	Season	ISU Championships or Olympics	(Junior) Grand Prix and Final		Selected International Competition	
Rank	Nation	Skater	Points	Season	Best	Best	2nd Best	Best	2nd Best
1	JPN	Yuzuru Hanyu	5390	2016/2017 season (100%)	1200	800	400	300	0
1	JPN	Yuzuru Hanyu	5390	2015/2016 season (100%)	1080	800	400	250	0
1	JPN	Yuzuru Hanyu	5390	2014/2015 season (70%)	756	560	252	0	0
2	JPN	Shoma Uno	4487	2016/2017 season (100%)	1080	648	400	300	0
2	JPN	Shoma Uno	4487	2015/2016 season (100%)	638	648	400	198	0
2	JPN	Shoma Uno	4487	2014/2015 season (70%)	386	245	175	175	0
3	ESP	Javier Fernandez	4282	2016/2017 season (100%)	875	583	400	0	0
3	ESP	Javier Fernandez	4282	2015/2016 season (100%)	1200	720	400	0	0
3	ESP	Javier Fernandez	4282	2014/2015 season (70%)	840	504	280	0	0
4	CAN	Patrick Chan	3805	2016/2017 season (100%)	787	525	400	270	0
4	CAN	Patrick Chan	3805	2015/2016 season (100%)	840	583	400	0	0
4	CAN	Patrick Chan	3805	2014/2015 season (70%)	0	0	0	0	0
5	USA	Jason Brown	3540	2016/2017 season (100%)	638	360	213	300	270
5	USA	Jason Brown	3540	2015/2016 season (100%)	0	324	0	300	270
5	USA	Jason Brown	3540	2014/2015 season (70%)	613	252	183	210	0
6	USA	Adam Rippon	3463	2016/2017 season (100%)	0	472	324	243	0
6	USA	Adam Rippon	3463	2015/2016 season (100%)	709	292	292	270	270
6	USA	Adam Rippon	3463	2014/2015 season (70%)	402	183	0	189	0
7	CHN	Boyang Jin	3451	2016/2017 season (100%)	972	360	262	0	0
7	CHN	Boyang Jin	3451	2015/2016 season (100%)	972	525	360	0	0
7	CHN	Boyang Jin	3451	2014/2015 season (70%)	315	178	175	0	0
8	RUS	Maxim Kovtun	3240	2016/2017 season (100%)	756	213	213	243	0
8	RUS	Maxim Kovtun	3240	2015/2016 season (100%)	680	360	0	300	0
8	RUS	Maxim Kovtun	3240	2014/2015 season (70%)	529	408	280	0	0
9	RUS	Mikhail Kolyada	3110	2016/2017 season (100%)	680	292	262	219	0
9	RUS	Mikhail Kolyada	3110	2015/2016 season (100%)	875	262	0	270	250
9	RUS	Mikhail Kolyada	3110	2014/2015 season (70%)	0	0	0	0	0
10	USA	Nathan Chen	3076	2016/2017 season (100%)	840	720	360	300	0
10	USA	Nathan Chen	3076	2015/2016 season (100%)	0	350	250	0	0
10	USA	Nathan Chen	3076	2014/2015 season (70%)	256	158	0	0	0
11	ISR	Alexei Bychenko	3022	2016/2017 season (100%)	551	324	292	300	225
11	ISR	Alexei Bychenko	3022	2015/2016 season (100%)	756	0	0	250	160
11	ISR	Alexei Bychenko	3022	2014/2015 season (70%)	428	149	0	175	139
12	KAZ	Denis Ten	2916	2016/2017 season (100%)	247	360	0	0	0
12	KAZ	Denis Ten	2916	2015/2016 season (100%)	418	292	0	300	225
12	KAZ	Denis Ten	2916	2014/2015 season (70%)	680	227	204	210	0
13	USA	Max Aaron	2811	2016/2017 season (100%)	0	292	262	243	243
13	USA	Max Aaron	2811	2015/2016 season (100%)	574	400	213	300	270
13	USA	Max Aaron	2811	2014/2015 season (70%)	0	227	149	210	0
14	RUS	Sergei Voronov	2764	2016/2017 season (100%)	0	324	292	300	0
14	RUS	Sergei Voronov	2764	2015/2016 season (100%)	0	262	236	243	203
14	RUS	Sergei Voronov	2764	2014/2015 season (70%)	476	454	252	210	153
15	JPN	Takahito Mura	2759	2016/2017 season (100%)	0	262	191	270	0
15	JPN	Takahito Mura	2759	2015/2016 season (100%)	551	324	0	203	0
15	JPN	Takahito Mura	2759	2014/2015 season (70%)	312	368	280	189	0
16	ISR	Daniel Samohin	2746	2016/2017 season (100%)	295	262	191	270	203
16	ISR	Daniel Samohin	2746	2015/2016 season (100%)	500	230	225	300	270
16	ISR	Daniel Samohin	2746	2014/2015 season (70%)	228	84	0	158	153
17	RUS	Alexander Samarin	2725	2016/2017 season (100%)	405	315	250	250	0
17	RUS	Alexander Samarin	2725	2015/2016 season (100%)	365	250	182	300	219
17	RUS	Alexander Samarin	2725	2014/2015 season (70%)	122	158	142	189	101
18	CZE	Michal Brezina	2654	2016/2017 season (100%)	264	292	0	0	0
18	CZE	Michal Brezina	2654	2015/2016 season (100%)	517	213	191	225	225
18	CZE	Michal Brezina	2654	2014/2015 season (70%)	386	227	149	189	189
19	RUS	Dmitri Aliev	2653	2016/2017 season (100%)	450	350	250	270	0
19	RUS	Dmitri Aliev	2653	2015/2016 season (100%)	295	315	250	270	203
19	RUS	Dmitri Aliev	2653	2014/2015 season (70%)	0	142	142	0	0
20	RUS	Alexander Petrov	2642	2016/2017 season (100%)	365	236	213	300	219
20	RUS	Alexander Petrov	2642	2015/2016 season (100%)	402	236	236	225	0
20	RUS	Alexander Petrov	2642	2014/2015 season (70%)	207	199	175	210	210
21	JPN	Keiji Tanaka	2553	2016/2017 season (100%)	237	324	213	250	0
21	JPN	Keiji Tanaka	2553	2015/2016 season (100%)	496	262	0	270	225
21	JPN	Keiji Tanaka	2553	2014/2015 season (70%)	0	134	0	142	0
22	UZB	Misha Ge	2509	2016/2017 season (100%)	446	236	213	270	0
22	UZB	Misha Ge	2509	2015/2016 season (100%)	275	191	0	300	0
22	UZB	Misha Ge	2509	2014/2015 season (70%)	496	204	183	153	0
23	CAN	Nam Nguyen	2503	2016/2017 season (100%)	402	236	191	198	0
23	CAN	Nam Nguyen	2503	2015/2016 season (100%)	0	262	213	225	0
23	CAN	Nam Nguyen	2503	2014/2015 season (70%)	551	227	204	189	0
24	LAT	Deniss Vasiljevs	2255	2016/2017 season (100%)	446	236	0	250	0
24	LAT	Deniss Vasiljevs	2255	2015/2016 season (100%)	305	225	225	243	198
24	LAT	Deniss Vasiljevs	2255	2014/2015 season (70%)	186	127	127	0	0
25	BEL	Jorik Hendrickx	2230	2016/2017 season (100%)	612	236	0	270	250
25	BEL	Jorik Hendrickx	2230	2015/2016 season (100%)	362	0	0	250	250
25	BEL	Jorik Hendrickx	2230	2014/2015 season (70%)	0	0	0	0	0
26	CHN	Han Yan	2199	2016/2017 season (100%)	325	262	0	0	0
26	CHN	Han Yan	2199	2015/2016 season (100%)	680	324	292	0	0
26	CHN	Han Yan	2199	2014/2015 season (70%)	476	165	134	0	0
27	USA	Grant Hochstein	2165	2016/2017 season (100%)	362	0	0	243	198
27	USA	Grant Hochstein	2165	2015/2016 season (100%)	465	292	292	160	0
27	USA	Grant Hochstein	2165	2014/2015 season (70%)	0	0	0	153	153
28	JPN	Daisuke Murakami	2068	2016/2017 season (100%)	0	0	0	219	0
28	JPN	Daisuke Murakami	2068	2015/2016 season (100%)	0	472	324	0	0
28	JPN	Daisuke Murakami	2068	2014/2015 season (70%)	428	280	0	175	170
29	FRA	Chafik Besseghier	2055	2016/2017 season (100%)	362	191	191	250	250
29	FRA	Chafik Besseghier	2055	2015/2016 season (100%)	162	0	0	250	250
29	FRA	Chafik Besseghier	2055	2014/2015 season (70%)	140	149	0	158	0
30	CAN	Kevin Reynolds	2004	2016/2017 season (100%)	517	324	0	270	0
30	CAN	Kevin Reynolds	2004	2015/2016 season (100%)	293	0	0	250	225
30	CAN	Kevin Reynolds	2004	2014/2015 season (70%)	0	0	0	125	0
31	USA	Vincent Zhou	1986	2016/2017 season (100%)	500	225	203	250	0
31	USA	Vincent Zhou	1986	2015/2016 season (100%)	328	255	225	0	0
31	USA	Vincent Zhou	1986	2014/2015 season (70%)	0	0	0	0	0
32	RUS	Adian Pitkeev	1870	2016/2017 season (100%)	0	0	0	0	0
32	RUS	Adian Pitkeev	1870	2015/2016 season (100%)	0	360	236	243	219
32	RUS	Adian Pitkeev	1870	2014/2015 season (70%)	312	165	165	170	0
33	RUS	Konstantin Menshov	1775	2016/2017 season (100%)	0	0	0	0	0
33	RUS	Konstantin Menshov	1775	2015/2016 season (100%)	0	262	236	300	250
33	RUS	Konstantin Menshov	1775	2014/2015 season (70%)	0	204	183	170	170
34	FRA	Kevin Aymoz	1764	2016/2017 season (100%)	266	182	148	250	0
34	FRA	Kevin Aymoz	1764	2015/2016 season (100%)	215	182	0	203	160
34	FRA	Kevin Aymoz	1764	2014/2015 season (70%)	0	0	0	158	0
35	ITA	Matteo Rizzo	1759	2016/2017 season (100%)	174	120	0	250	182
35	ITA	Matteo Rizzo	1759	2015/2016 season (100%)	237	164	164	243	225
35	ITA	Matteo Rizzo	1759	2014/2015 season (70%)	39	0	0	170	0
36	USA	Ross Miner	1720	2016/2017 season (100%)	0	0	0	178	0
36	USA	Ross Miner	1720	2015/2016 season (100%)	214	324	213	243	0
36	USA	Ross Miner	1720	2014/2015 season (70%)	0	149	0	210	189
37	ITA	Ivan Righini	1683	2016/2017 season (100%)	237	0	0	0	0
37	ITA	Ivan Righini	1683	2015/2016 season (100%)	496	191	0	250	178
37	ITA	Ivan Righini	1683	2014/2015 season (70%)	281	0	0	175	112
38	UKR	Ivan Pavlov	1650	2016/2017 season (100%)	214	182	133	250	0
38	UKR	Ivan Pavlov	1650	2015/2016 season (100%)	192	203	120	198	0
38	UKR	Ivan Pavlov	1650	2014/2015 season (70%)	72	115	93	158	0
39	PHI	Michael Christian Martinez	1645	2016/2017 season (100%)	214	0	0	164	0
39	PHI	Michael Christian Martinez	1645	2015/2016 season (100%)	362	236	0	250	219
39	PHI	Michael Christian Martinez	1645	2014/2015 season (70%)	102	0	0	189	175
40	SWE	Alexander Majorov	1611	2016/2017 season (100%)	293	0	0	300	250
40	SWE	Alexander Majorov	1611	2015/2016 season (100%)	293	0	0	250	225
40	SWE	Alexander Majorov	1611	2014/2015 season (70%)	205	0	0	158	0
41	AUS	Brendan Kerry	1576	2016/2017 season (100%)	293	0	0	219	198
41	AUS	Brendan Kerry	1576	2015/2016 season (100%)	222	191	0	250	203
41	AUS	Brendan Kerry	1576	2014/2015 season (70%)	113	0	0	115	0
42	MAS	Julian Zhi Jie Yee	1495	2016/2017 season (100%)	192	0	0	219	203
42	MAS	Julian Zhi Jie Yee	1495	2015/2016 season (100%)	192	182	133	270	0
42	MAS	Julian Zhi Jie Yee	1495	2014/2015 season (70%)	64	104	0	0	0
43	GEO	Moris Kvitelashvili	1390	2016/2017 season (100%)	496	0	0	250	203
43	GEO	Moris Kvitelashvili	1390	2015/2016 season (100%)	0	0	0	243	198
43	GEO	Moris Kvitelashvili	1390	2014/2015 season (70%)	0	0	0	139	139
44	KOR	Jinseo Kim	1231	2016/2017 season (100%)	156	0	0	225	178
44	KOR	Jinseo Kim	1231	2015/2016 season (100%)	325	0	0	0	0
44	KOR	Jinseo Kim	1231	2014/2015 season (70%)	151	0	0	189	158
45	GER	Paul Fentz	1206	2016/2017 season (100%)	325	0	0	225	203
45	GER	Paul Fentz	1206	2015/2016 season (100%)	173	0	0	0	0
45	GER	Paul Fentz	1206	2014/2015 season (70%)	0	0	0	153	127
46	CAN	Roman Sadovsky	1199	2016/2017 season (100%)	93	225	164	160	0
46	CAN	Roman Sadovsky	1199	2015/2016 season (100%)	0	250	207	0	0
46	CAN	Roman Sadovsky	1199	2014/2015 season (70%)	89	175	161	0	0
47	JPN	Sota Yamamoto	1197	2016/2017 season (100%)	0	0	0	0	0
47	JPN	Sota Yamamoto	1197	2015/2016 season (100%)	0	284	250	0	0
47	JPN	Sota Yamamoto	1197	2014/2015 season (70%)	284	221	158	0	0
48	SUI	Stephane Walker	1181	2016/2017 season (100%)	156	0	0	250	243
48	SUI	Stephane Walker	1181	2015/2016 season (100%)	126	0	0	203	203
48	SUI	Stephane Walker	1181	2014/2015 season (70%)	0	0	0	0	0
49	USA	Timothy Dolensky	1180	2016/2017 season (100%)	0	191	0	178	160
49	USA	Timothy Dolensky	1180	2015/2016 season (100%)	0	213	0	219	219
49	USA	Timothy Dolensky	1180	2014/2015 season (70%)	0	0	0	153	0
50	CAN	Nicolas Nadeau	1179	2016/2017 season (100%)	157	0	0	0	0
50	CAN	Nicolas Nadeau	1179	2015/2016 season (100%)	450	225	164	0	0
50	CAN	Nicolas Nadeau	1179	2014/2015 season (70%)	0	115	68	0	0
51	RUS	Roman Savosin	1175	2016/2017 season (100%)	0	255	250	300	243
51	RUS	Roman Savosin	1175	2015/2016 season (100%)	127	0	0	0	0
51	RUS	Roman Savosin	1175	2014/2015 season (70%)	0	0	0	0	0
52	USA	Richard Dornbush	1168	2016/2017 season (100%)	0	0	0	0	0
52	USA	Richard Dornbush	1168	2015/2016 season (100%)	0	213	191	178	0
52	USA	Richard Dornbush	1168	2014/2015 season (70%)	0	227	149	210	0
53	UKR	Yaroslav Paniot	1164	2016/2017 season (100%)	194	164	164	0	0
53	UKR	Yaroslav Paniot	1164	2015/2016 season (100%)	174	182	0	144	0
53	UKR	Yaroslav Paniot	1164	2014/2015 season (70%)	121	142	0	0	0
54	GER	Franz Streubel	1157	2016/2017 season (100%)	0	0	0	0	0
54	GER	Franz Streubel	1157	2015/2016 season (100%)	214	0	0	225	219
54	GER	Franz Streubel	1157	2014/2015 season (70%)	166	0	0	175	158
55	KOR	Jun Hwan Cha	1128	2016/2017 season (100%)	328	284	250	0	0
55	KOR	Jun Hwan Cha	1128	2015/2016 season (100%)	266	0	0	0	0
55	KOR	Jun Hwan Cha	1128	2014/2015 season (70%)	0	0	0	0	0
56	KOR	June Hyoung Lee	1115	2016/2017 season (100%)	140	0	0	182	0
56	KOR	June Hyoung Lee	1115	2015/2016 season (100%)	173	0	0	0	0
56	KOR	June Hyoung Lee	1115	2014/2015 season (70%)	126	175	145	158	142
57	GER	Peter Liebers	1094	2016/2017 season (100%)	0	0	0	225	182
57	GER	Peter Liebers	1094	2015/2016 season (100%)	0	0	0	198	0
57	GER	Peter Liebers	1094	2014/2015 season (70%)	347	0	0	142	0
58	USA	Alexei Krasnozhon	1086	2016/2017 season (100%)	239	250	230	0	0
58	USA	Alexei Krasnozhon	1086	2015/2016 season (100%)	0	203	164	0	0
58	USA	Alexei Krasnozhon	1086	2014/2015 season (70%)	0	0	0	0	0
59	GBR	Graham Newberry	1062	2016/2017 season (100%)	173	120	0	225	203
59	GBR	Graham Newberry	1062	2015/2016 season (100%)	0	0	0	0	0
59	GBR	Graham Newberry	1062	2014/2015 season (70%)	43	104	93	101	0
60	ITA	Maurizio Zandron	1051	2016/2017 season (100%)	126	0	0	250	225
60	ITA	Maurizio Zandron	1051	2015/2016 season (100%)	0	0	0	225	225
60	ITA	Maurizio Zandron	1051	2014/2015 season (70%)	0	0	0	142	0
61	GBR	Phillip Harris	1041	2016/2017 season (100%)	0	0	0	225	182
61	GBR	Phillip Harris	1041	2015/2016 season (100%)	140	0	0	182	178
61	GBR	Phillip Harris	1041	2014/2015 season (70%)	134	0	0	139	127
62	USA	Andrew Torgashev	1028	2016/2017 season (100%)	0	225	182	243	0
62	USA	Andrew Torgashev	1028	2015/2016 season (100%)	0	0	0	0	0
62	USA	Andrew Torgashev	1028	2014/2015 season (70%)	136	127	115	0	0
63	CAN	Liam Firus	995	2016/2017 season (100%)	0	0	0	198	0
63	CAN	Liam Firus	995	2015/2016 season (100%)	237	0	0	250	160
63	CAN	Liam Firus	995	2014/2015 season (70%)	150	0	0	0	0
64	CAN	Elladj Balde	984	2016/2017 season (100%)	0	236	0	144	0
64	CAN	Elladj Balde	984	2015/2016 season (100%)	0	0	0	300	0
64	CAN	Elladj Balde	984	2014/2015 season (70%)	0	165	0	139	0
65	CHN	He Zhang	978	2016/2017 season (100%)	0	0	0	0	0
65	CHN	He Zhang	978	2015/2016 season (100%)	194	203	182	0	0
65	CHN	He Zhang	978	2014/2015 season (70%)	99	158	142	0	0
66	RUS	Anton Shulepov	963	2016/2017 season (100%)	0	0	0	270	225
66	RUS	Anton Shulepov	963	2015/2016 season (100%)	0	0	0	270	198
66	RUS	Anton Shulepov	963	2014/2015 season (70%)	0	0	0	0	0
67	USA	Tomoki Hiwatashi	920	2016/2017 season (100%)	0	148	0	0	0
67	USA	Tomoki Hiwatashi	920	2015/2016 season (100%)	405	203	164	0	0
67	USA	Tomoki Hiwatashi	920	2014/2015 season (70%)	0	0	0	0	0
68	FIN	Valtter Virtanen	915	2016/2017 season (100%)	83	0	0	164	0
68	FIN	Valtter Virtanen	915	2015/2016 season (100%)	0	0	0	225	203
68	FIN	Valtter Virtanen	915	2014/2015 season (70%)	98	0	0	142	125
69	ESP	Felipe Montoya	906	2016/2017 season (100%)	0	0	0	203	0
69	ESP	Felipe Montoya	906	2015/2016 season (100%)	156	0	0	250	182
69	ESP	Felipe Montoya	906	2014/2015 season (70%)	0	0	0	115	0
70	ESP	Javier Raya	905	2016/2017 season (100%)	140	0	0	182	160
70	ESP	Javier Raya	905	2015/2016 season (100%)	0	0	0	0	0
70	ESP	Javier Raya	905	2014/2015 season (70%)	150	0	0	158	115
70	TPE	Chih-I Tsao	905	2016/2017 season (100%)	126	120	0	164	0
70	TPE	Chih-I Tsao	905	2015/2016 season (100%)	102	0	0	182	0
70	TPE	Chih-I Tsao	905	2014/2015 season (70%)	88	84	0	127	0
72	RUS	Artur Dmitriev	898	2016/2017 season (100%)	0	0	0	178	0
72	RUS	Artur Dmitriev	898	2015/2016 season (100%)	0	0	0	300	250
72	RUS	Artur Dmitriev	898	2014/2015 season (70%)	0	0	0	170	158
73	ARM	Slavik Hayrapetyan	863	2016/2017 season (100%)	102	0	0	203	0
73	ARM	Slavik Hayrapetyan	863	2015/2016 season (100%)	0	0	0	225	160
73	ARM	Slavik Hayrapetyan	863	2014/2015 season (70%)	31	0	0	142	0
74	RUS	Gordei Gorshkov	849	2016/2017 season (100%)	0	0	0	198	0
74	RUS	Gordei Gorshkov	849	2015/2016 season (100%)	0	0	0	243	219
74	RUS	Gordei Gorshkov	849	2014/2015 season (70%)	0	0	0	189	170
74	AZE	Larry Loupolover	849	2016/2017 season (100%)	0	0	0	203	182
74	AZE	Larry Loupolover	849	2015/2016 season (100%)	0	0	0	203	203
74	AZE	Larry Loupolover	849	2014/2015 season (70%)	58	0	0	0	0
76	ARG	Denis Margalik	839	2016/2017 season (100%)	0	0	0	0	0
76	ARG	Denis Margalik	839	2015/2016 season (100%)	156	203	120	0	0
76	ARG	Denis Margalik	839	2014/2015 season (70%)	121	127	0	112	0
77	GEO	Irakli Maysuradze	833	2016/2017 season (100%)	0	148	133	225	225
77	GEO	Irakli Maysuradze	833	2015/2016 season (100%)	44	0	0	0	0
77	GEO	Irakli Maysuradze	833	2014/2015 season (70%)	58	0	0	0	0
78	JPN	Koshiro Shimada	809	2016/2017 season (100%)	127	203	182	0	0
78	JPN	Koshiro Shimada	809	2015/2016 season (100%)	0	164	133	0	0
78	JPN	Koshiro Shimada	809	2014/2015 season (70%)	0	0	0	0	0
79	NOR	Sondre Oddvoll Bøe	771	2016/2017 season (100%)	75	120	0	0	0
79	NOR	Sondre Oddvoll Bøe	771	2015/2016 season (100%)	74	97	97	164	144
79	NOR	Sondre Oddvoll Bøe	771	2014/2015 season (70%)	64	0	0	0	0
80	ITA	Dario Betti	747	2016/2017 season (100%)	0	0	0	203	164
80	ITA	Dario Betti	747	2015/2016 season (100%)	0	0	0	198	182
80	ITA	Dario Betti	747	2014/2015 season (70%)	0	0	0	0	0
81	JPN	Kazuki Tomono	714	2016/2017 season (100%)	215	203	182	0	0
81	JPN	Kazuki Tomono	714	2015/2016 season (100%)	114	0	0	0	0
81	JPN	Kazuki Tomono	714	2014/2015 season (70%)	0	0	0	0	0
82	JPN	Ryuju Hino	705	2016/2017 season (100%)	0	0	0	182	0
82	JPN	Ryuju Hino	705	2015/2016 season (100%)	0	0	0	203	178
82	JPN	Ryuju Hino	705	2014/2015 season (70%)	0	0	0	142	0
83	RUS	Andrei Lazukin	681	2016/2017 season (100%)	0	0	0	0	0
83	RUS	Andrei Lazukin	681	2015/2016 season (100%)	0	108	0	0	0
83	RUS	Andrei Lazukin	681	2014/2015 season (70%)	0	175	84	175	139
84	RUS	Petr Gumennik	676	2016/2017 season (100%)	0	182	164	0	0
84	RUS	Petr Gumennik	676	2015/2016 season (100%)	0	182	148	0	0
84	RUS	Petr Gumennik	676	2014/2015 season (70%)	0	0	0	0	0
85	CZE	Petr Kotlarik	666	2016/2017 season (100%)	49	0	0	164	0
85	CZE	Petr Kotlarik	666	2015/2016 season (100%)	0	108	97	164	0
85	CZE	Petr Kotlarik	666	2014/2015 season (70%)	0	84	0	0	0
86	USA	Alexander Johnson	663	2016/2017 season (100%)	0	0	0	178	0
86	USA	Alexander Johnson	663	2015/2016 season (100%)	0	0	0	182	178
86	USA	Alexander Johnson	663	2014/2015 season (70%)	0	0	0	125	101
87	CAN	Keegan Messing	660	2016/2017 season (100%)	0	0	0	243	219
87	CAN	Keegan Messing	660	2015/2016 season (100%)	0	0	0	198	0
87	CAN	Keegan Messing	660	2014/2015 season (70%)	0	0	0	0	0
88	CZE	Jiri Belohradsky	646	2016/2017 season (100%)	113	120	97	0	0
88	CZE	Jiri Belohradsky	646	2015/2016 season (100%)	113	0	0	203	0
88	CZE	Jiri Belohradsky	646	2014/2015 season (70%)	0	0	0	0	0
89	KAZ	Abzal Rakimgaliev	599	2016/2017 season (100%)	0	0	0	182	160
89	KAZ	Abzal Rakimgaliev	599	2015/2016 season (100%)	0	0	0	178	0
89	KAZ	Abzal Rakimgaliev	599	2014/2015 season (70%)	79	0	0	0	0
90	JPN	Hiroaki Sato	592	2016/2017 season (100%)	0	0	0	225	0
90	JPN	Hiroaki Sato	592	2015/2016 season (100%)	0	0	0	203	0
90	JPN	Hiroaki Sato	592	2014/2015 season (70%)	80	84	0	0	0
91	BLR	Pavel Ignatenko	552	2016/2017 season (100%)	0	0	0	0	0
91	BLR	Pavel Ignatenko	552	2015/2016 season (100%)	0	0	0	178	178
91	BLR	Pavel Ignatenko	552	2014/2015 season (70%)	71	0	0	125	0
92	FIN	Matthias Versluis	547	2016/2017 season (100%)	0	0	0	0	0
92	FIN	Matthias Versluis	547	2015/2016 season (100%)	0	0	0	250	182
92	FIN	Matthias Versluis	547	2014/2015 season (70%)	0	0	0	115	0
93	FRA	Romain Ponsart	542	2016/2017 season (100%)	0	0	0	203	0
93	FRA	Romain Ponsart	542	2015/2016 season (100%)	0	0	0	164	0
93	FRA	Romain Ponsart	542	2014/2015 season (70%)	0	0	0	175	0
94	CRO	Nicholas Vrdoljak	530	2016/2017 season (100%)	0	0	0	164	144
94	CRO	Nicholas Vrdoljak	530	2015/2016 season (100%)	102	120	0	0	0
94	CRO	Nicholas Vrdoljak	530	2014/2015 season (70%)	0	0	0	0	0
95	GBR	Harry Mattick	526	2016/2017 season (100%)	0	0	0	250	164
95	GBR	Harry Mattick	526	2015/2016 season (100%)	0	0	0	0	0
95	GBR	Harry Mattick	526	2014/2015 season (70%)	0	0	0	112	0
96	JPN	Shu Nakamura	525	2016/2017 season (100%)	0	0	0	203	0
96	JPN	Shu Nakamura	525	2015/2016 season (100%)	157	97	0	0	0
96	JPN	Shu Nakamura	525	2014/2015 season (70%)	0	68	0	0	0
97	KOR	Sihyeong Lee	521	2016/2017 season (100%)	173	120	0	0	0
97	KOR	Sihyeong Lee	521	2015/2016 season (100%)	0	120	108	0	0
97	KOR	Sihyeong Lee	521	2014/2015 season (70%)	0	0	0	0	0
98	RUS	Daniil Bernadiner	500	2016/2017 season (100%)	0	0	0	0	0
98	RUS	Daniil Bernadiner	500	2015/2016 season (100%)	0	164	148	0	0
98	RUS	Daniil Bernadiner	500	2014/2015 season (70%)	0	104	84	0	0
98	JPN	Mitsuki Sumoto	500	2016/2017 season (100%)	0	203	164	0	0
98	JPN	Mitsuki Sumoto	500	2015/2016 season (100%)	0	133	0	0	0
98	JPN	Mitsuki Sumoto	500	2014/2015 season (70%)	0	0	0	0	0
100	USA	Jordan Moeller	497	2016/2017 season (100%)	0	0	0	225	0
100	USA	Jordan Moeller	497	2015/2016 season (100%)	0	0	0	160	0
100	USA	Jordan Moeller	497	2014/2015 season (70%)	0	0	0	112	0
101	ITA	Alessandro Fadini	492	2016/2017 season (100%)	0	0	0	164	164
101	ITA	Alessandro Fadini	492	2015/2016 season (100%)	0	0	0	164	0
101	ITA	Alessandro Fadini	492	2014/2015 season (70%)	0	0	0	0	0
102	HKG	Ronald Lam	491	2016/2017 season (100%)	0	0	0	0	0
102	HKG	Ronald Lam	491	2015/2016 season (100%)	0	0	0	0	0
102	HKG	Ronald Lam	491	2014/2015 season (70%)	213	0	0	139	139
103	CHN	Tangxu Li	483	2016/2017 season (100%)	61	164	0	0	0
103	CHN	Tangxu Li	483	2015/2016 season (100%)	0	182	0	0	0
103	CHN	Tangxu Li	483	2014/2015 season (70%)	0	76	0	0	0
104	ITA	Marco Zandron	479	2016/2017 season (100%)	0	0	0	0	0
104	ITA	Marco Zandron	479	2015/2016 season (100%)	0	0	0	182	182
104	ITA	Marco Zandron	479	2014/2015 season (70%)	0	0	0	115	0
105	FIN	Roman Galay	476	2016/2017 season (100%)	0	0	0	0	0
105	FIN	Roman Galay	476	2015/2016 season (100%)	0	148	0	164	164
105	FIN	Roman Galay	476	2014/2015 season (70%)	0	0	0	0	0
106	CAN	Conrad Orzel	463	2016/2017 season (100%)	141	225	97	0	0
106	CAN	Conrad Orzel	463	2015/2016 season (100%)	0	0	0	0	0
106	CAN	Conrad Orzel	463	2014/2015 season (70%)	0	0	0	0	0
107	GER	Alexander Bjelde	460	2016/2017 season (100%)	0	0	0	0	0
107	GER	Alexander Bjelde	460	2015/2016 season (100%)	0	0	0	203	0
107	GER	Alexander Bjelde	460	2014/2015 season (70%)	0	0	0	142	115
108	RUS	Ilia Skirda	450	2016/2017 season (100%)	0	225	225	0	0
108	RUS	Ilia Skirda	450	2015/2016 season (100%)	0	0	0	0	0
108	RUS	Ilia Skirda	450	2014/2015 season (70%)	0	0	0	0	0
109	CAN	Bennet Toman	448	2016/2017 season (100%)	0	0	0	198	0
109	CAN	Bennet Toman	448	2015/2016 season (100%)	0	0	0	182	0
109	CAN	Bennet Toman	448	2014/2015 season (70%)	0	68	0	0	0
110	EST	Daniel Albert Naurits	447	2016/2017 season (100%)	92	0	0	203	0
110	EST	Daniel Albert Naurits	447	2015/2016 season (100%)	0	0	0	0	0
110	EST	Daniel Albert Naurits	447	2014/2015 season (70%)	0	84	68	0	0
111	CHN	Yi Wang	444	2016/2017 season (100%)	0	0	0	0	0
111	CHN	Yi Wang	444	2015/2016 season (100%)	0	191	0	0	0
111	CHN	Yi Wang	444	2014/2015 season (70%)	253	0	0	0	0
112	GER	Niko Ulanovsky	443	2016/2017 season (100%)	0	0	0	0	0
112	GER	Niko Ulanovsky	443	2015/2016 season (100%)	0	120	97	0	0
112	GER	Niko Ulanovsky	443	2014/2015 season (70%)	65	93	68	0	0
113	SUI	Nicola Todeschini	435	2016/2017 season (100%)	0	0	0	0	0
113	SUI	Nicola Todeschini	435	2015/2016 season (100%)	55	0	0	182	164
113	SUI	Nicola Todeschini	435	2014/2015 season (70%)	34	0	0	0	0
114	FRA	Adrien Tesson	424	2016/2017 season (100%)	0	0	0	178	0
114	FRA	Adrien Tesson	424	2015/2016 season (100%)	0	0	0	0	0
114	FRA	Adrien Tesson	424	2014/2015 season (70%)	0	104	0	142	0
115	RUS	Artem Lezheev	422	2016/2017 season (100%)	0	0	0	203	0
115	RUS	Artem Lezheev	422	2015/2016 season (100%)	0	0	0	219	0
115	RUS	Artem Lezheev	422	2014/2015 season (70%)	0	0	0	0	0
116	USA	Stephen Carriere	414	2016/2017 season (100%)	0	0	0	0	0
116	USA	Stephen Carriere	414	2015/2016 season (100%)	0	0	0	0	0
116	USA	Stephen Carriere	414	2014/2015 season (70%)	0	204	0	210	0
117	SWE	Ondrej Spiegl	389	2016/2017 season (100%)	0	0	0	225	164
117	SWE	Ondrej Spiegl	389	2015/2016 season (100%)	0	0	0	0	0
117	SWE	Ondrej Spiegl	389	2014/2015 season (70%)	0	0	0	0	0
118	KOR	Se Jong Byun	382	2016/2017 season (100%)	0	0	0	0	0
118	KOR	Se Jong Byun	382	2015/2016 season (100%)	140	108	0	0	0
118	KOR	Se Jong Byun	382	2014/2015 season (70%)	58	76	0	0	0
118	USA	Kevin Shum	382	2016/2017 season (100%)	0	133	0	0	0
118	USA	Kevin Shum	382	2015/2016 season (100%)	0	108	0	0	0
118	USA	Kevin Shum	382	2014/2015 season (70%)	48	93	0	0	0
120	JPN	Daichi Miyata	379	2016/2017 season (100%)	0	0	0	0	0
120	JPN	Daichi Miyata	379	2015/2016 season (100%)	83	148	148	0	0
120	JPN	Daichi Miyata	379	2014/2015 season (70%)	0	0	0	0	0
121	JPN	Hidetsugu Kamata	375	2016/2017 season (100%)	0	0	0	0	0
121	JPN	Hidetsugu Kamata	375	2015/2016 season (100%)	0	133	0	0	0
121	JPN	Hidetsugu Kamata	375	2014/2015 season (70%)	0	115	0	127	0
122	GER	Martin Rappe	373	2016/2017 season (100%)	0	0	0	0	0
122	GER	Martin Rappe	373	2015/2016 season (100%)	0	0	0	203	0
122	GER	Martin Rappe	373	2014/2015 season (70%)	0	0	0	170	0
123	AUS	Andrew Dodds	370	2016/2017 season (100%)	113	0	0	0	0
123	AUS	Andrew Dodds	370	2015/2016 season (100%)	113	0	0	144	0
123	AUS	Andrew Dodds	370	2014/2015 season (70%)	0	0	0	0	0
124	GBR	Charlie Parry-Evans	367	2016/2017 season (100%)	0	0	0	0	0
124	GBR	Charlie Parry-Evans	367	2015/2016 season (100%)	0	0	0	203	164
124	GBR	Charlie Parry-Evans	367	2014/2015 season (70%)	0	0	0	0	0
125	USA	Jeremy Abbott	366	2016/2017 season (100%)	0	0	0	0	0
125	USA	Jeremy Abbott	366	2015/2016 season (100%)	0	0	0	0	0
125	USA	Jeremy Abbott	366	2014/2015 season (70%)	0	183	183	0	0
126	USA	Sean Rabbitt	363	2016/2017 season (100%)	0	0	0	160	0
126	USA	Sean Rabbitt	363	2015/2016 season (100%)	0	0	0	203	0
126	USA	Sean Rabbitt	363	2014/2015 season (70%)	0	0	0	0	0
127	USA	Tony Lu	357	2016/2017 season (100%)	0	0	0	0	0
127	USA	Tony Lu	357	2015/2016 season (100%)	0	148	133	0	0
127	USA	Tony Lu	357	2014/2015 season (70%)	0	76	0	0	0
128	GBR	Peter James Hallam	352	2016/2017 season (100%)	0	0	0	0	0
128	GBR	Peter James Hallam	352	2015/2016 season (100%)	0	0	0	225	0
128	GBR	Peter James Hallam	352	2014/2015 season (70%)	0	0	0	127	0
129	POL	Krzysztof Gala	342	2016/2017 season (100%)	0	0	0	0	0
129	POL	Krzysztof Gala	342	2015/2016 season (100%)	0	0	0	182	160
129	POL	Krzysztof Gala	342	2014/2015 season (70%)	0	0	0	0	0
130	ITA	Adrien Bannister	328	2016/2017 season (100%)	0	0	0	164	0
130	ITA	Adrien Bannister	328	2015/2016 season (100%)	0	0	0	164	0
130	ITA	Adrien Bannister	328	2014/2015 season (70%)	0	0	0	0	0
130	ITA	Alberto Vanz	328	2016/2017 season (100%)	0	0	0	164	0
130	ITA	Alberto Vanz	328	2015/2016 season (100%)	0	0	0	164	0
130	ITA	Alberto Vanz	328	2014/2015 season (70%)	0	0	0	0	0
132	SUI	Lukas Britschgi	322	2016/2017 season (100%)	0	97	0	225	0
132	SUI	Lukas Britschgi	322	2015/2016 season (100%)	0	0	0	0	0
132	SUI	Lukas Britschgi	322	2014/2015 season (70%)	0	0	0	0	0
133	DEN	Justus Strid	315	2016/2017 season (100%)	0	0	0	0	0
133	DEN	Justus Strid	315	2015/2016 season (100%)	0	0	0	0	0
133	DEN	Justus Strid	315	2014/2015 season (70%)	88	0	0	115	112
134	CAN	Joseph Phan	312	2016/2017 season (100%)	0	164	148	0	0
134	CAN	Joseph Phan	312	2015/2016 season (100%)	0	0	0	0	0
134	CAN	Joseph Phan	312	2014/2015 season (70%)	0	0	0	0	0
135	CZE	Matyas Belohradsky	311	2016/2017 season (100%)	0	203	108	0	0
135	CZE	Matyas Belohradsky	311	2015/2016 season (100%)	0	0	0	0	0
135	CZE	Matyas Belohradsky	311	2014/2015 season (70%)	0	0	0	0	0
136	RUS	Murad Kurbanov	309	2016/2017 season (100%)	0	0	0	182	0
136	RUS	Murad Kurbanov	309	2015/2016 season (100%)	0	0	0	0	0
136	RUS	Murad Kurbanov	309	2014/2015 season (70%)	0	127	0	0	0
137	AUT	Mario-Rafael Ionian	308	2016/2017 season (100%)	0	0	0	0	0
137	AUT	Mario-Rafael Ionian	308	2015/2016 season (100%)	83	0	0	225	0
137	AUT	Mario-Rafael Ionian	308	2014/2015 season (70%)	0	0	0	0	0
137	EST	Samuel Koppel	308	2016/2017 season (100%)	0	0	0	164	144
137	EST	Samuel Koppel	308	2015/2016 season (100%)	0	0	0	0	0
137	EST	Samuel Koppel	308	2014/2015 season (70%)	0	0	0	0	0
139	POL	Patrick Myzyk	305	2016/2017 season (100%)	0	0	0	0	0
139	POL	Patrick Myzyk	305	2015/2016 season (100%)	0	0	0	0	0
139	POL	Patrick Myzyk	305	2014/2015 season (70%)	79	0	0	125	101
140	RUS	Artem Kovalev	296	2016/2017 season (100%)	0	148	148	0	0
140	RUS	Artem Kovalev	296	2015/2016 season (100%)	0	0	0	0	0
140	RUS	Artem Kovalev	296	2014/2015 season (70%)	0	0	0	0	0
141	SLO	David Kranjec	295	2016/2017 season (100%)	0	0	0	0	0
141	SLO	David Kranjec	295	2015/2016 season (100%)	92	0	0	203	0
141	SLO	David Kranjec	295	2014/2015 season (70%)	0	0	0	0	0
142	SWE	Marcus Björk	294	2016/2017 season (100%)	0	0	0	182	0
142	SWE	Marcus Björk	294	2015/2016 season (100%)	0	0	0	0	0
142	SWE	Marcus Björk	294	2014/2015 season (70%)	0	0	0	112	0
143	ITA	Daniel Grassl	266	2016/2017 season (100%)	0	133	133	0	0
143	ITA	Daniel Grassl	266	2015/2016 season (100%)	0	0	0	0	0
143	ITA	Daniel Grassl	266	2014/2015 season (70%)	0	0	0	0	0
144	JPN	Sei Kawahara	257	2016/2017 season (100%)	0	0	0	0	0
144	JPN	Sei Kawahara	257	2015/2016 season (100%)	0	0	0	0	0
144	JPN	Sei Kawahara	257	2014/2015 season (70%)	0	142	115	0	0
145	RUS	Vladimir Samoilov	252	2016/2017 season (100%)	0	0	0	0	0
145	RUS	Vladimir Samoilov	252	2015/2016 season (100%)	0	148	0	0	0
145	RUS	Vladimir Samoilov	252	2014/2015 season (70%)	0	104	0	0	0
146	RUS	Zhan Bush	243	2016/2017 season (100%)	0	0	0	0	0
146	RUS	Zhan Bush	243	2015/2016 season (100%)	0	0	0	243	0
146	RUS	Zhan Bush	243	2014/2015 season (70%)	0	0	0	0	0
147	USA	Oleksiy Melnyk	241	2016/2017 season (100%)	0	108	0	0	0
147	USA	Oleksiy Melnyk	241	2015/2016 season (100%)	0	133	0	0	0
147	USA	Oleksiy Melnyk	241	2014/2015 season (70%)	0	0	0	0	0
148	USA	Shotaro Omori	231	2016/2017 season (100%)	0	0	0	0	0
148	USA	Shotaro Omori	231	2015/2016 season (100%)	0	0	0	0	0
148	USA	Shotaro Omori	231	2014/2015 season (70%)	0	127	104	0	0
149	FRA	Simon Hocquaux	230	2016/2017 season (100%)	0	0	0	0	0
149	FRA	Simon Hocquaux	230	2015/2016 season (100%)	0	0	0	0	0
149	FRA	Simon Hocquaux	230	2014/2015 season (70%)	0	115	115	0	0
150	RUS	Igor Efimchuk	225	2016/2017 season (100%)	0	0	0	225	0
150	RUS	Igor Efimchuk	225	2015/2016 season (100%)	0	0	0	0	0
150	RUS	Igor Efimchuk	225	2014/2015 season (70%)	0	0	0	0	0
151	EST	Aleksandr Selevko	223	2016/2017 season (100%)	0	148	0	0	0
151	EST	Aleksandr Selevko	223	2015/2016 season (100%)	75	0	0	0	0
151	EST	Aleksandr Selevko	223	2014/2015 season (70%)	0	0	0	0	0
152	POL	Igor Reznichenko	219	2016/2017 season (100%)	0	0	0	219	0
152	POL	Igor Reznichenko	219	2015/2016 season (100%)	0	0	0	0	0
152	POL	Igor Reznichenko	219	2014/2015 season (70%)	0	0	0	0	0
152	RUS	Pavel Vyugov	219	2016/2017 season (100%)	0	0	0	219	0
152	RUS	Pavel Vyugov	219	2015/2016 season (100%)	0	0	0	0	0
152	RUS	Pavel Vyugov	219	2014/2015 season (70%)	0	0	0	0	0
154	BLR	Yakau Zenko	213	2016/2017 season (100%)	0	0	0	0	0
154	BLR	Yakau Zenko	213	2015/2016 season (100%)	93	120	0	0	0
154	BLR	Yakau Zenko	213	2014/2015 season (70%)	0	0	0	0	0
155	RUS	Alexey Erokhov	203	2016/2017 season (100%)	0	203	0	0	0
155	RUS	Alexey Erokhov	203	2015/2016 season (100%)	0	0	0	0	0
155	RUS	Alexey Erokhov	203	2014/2015 season (70%)	0	0	0	0	0
155	RUS	Makar Ignatov	203	2016/2017 season (100%)	0	0	0	203	0
155	RUS	Makar Ignatov	203	2015/2016 season (100%)	0	0	0	0	0
155	RUS	Makar Ignatov	203	2014/2015 season (70%)	0	0	0	0	0
157	CAN	Anthony Kan	197	2016/2017 season (100%)	0	0	0	0	0
157	CAN	Anthony Kan	197	2015/2016 season (100%)	0	0	0	0	0
157	CAN	Anthony Kan	197	2014/2015 season (70%)	0	104	93	0	0
158	HKG	Leslie Man Cheuk Ip	184	2016/2017 season (100%)	92	0	0	0	0
158	HKG	Leslie Man Cheuk Ip	184	2015/2016 season (100%)	92	0	0	0	0
158	HKG	Leslie Man Cheuk Ip	184	2014/2015 season (70%)	0	0	0	0	0
159	SUI	Vincent Cuerel	182	2016/2017 season (100%)	0	0	0	0	0
159	SUI	Vincent Cuerel	182	2015/2016 season (100%)	0	0	0	182	0
159	SUI	Vincent Cuerel	182	2014/2015 season (70%)	0	0	0	0	0
159	CZE	Tomas Kupka	182	2016/2017 season (100%)	0	0	0	182	0
159	CZE	Tomas Kupka	182	2015/2016 season (100%)	0	0	0	0	0
159	CZE	Tomas Kupka	182	2014/2015 season (70%)	0	0	0	0	0
159	BLR	Alexei Mialionkhin	182	2016/2017 season (100%)	0	0	0	0	0
159	BLR	Alexei Mialionkhin	182	2015/2016 season (100%)	0	0	0	182	0
159	BLR	Alexei Mialionkhin	182	2014/2015 season (70%)	0	0	0	0	0
159	FIN	Tomi Pulkkinen	182	2016/2017 season (100%)	0	0	0	0	0
159	FIN	Tomi Pulkkinen	182	2015/2016 season (100%)	0	0	0	182	0
159	FIN	Tomi Pulkkinen	182	2014/2015 season (70%)	0	0	0	0	0
163	ITA	Jari Kessler	164	2016/2017 season (100%)	0	0	0	0	0
163	ITA	Jari Kessler	164	2015/2016 season (100%)	0	0	0	164	0
163	ITA	Jari Kessler	164	2014/2015 season (70%)	0	0	0	0	0
163	TPE	Meng Ju Lee	164	2016/2017 season (100%)	0	0	0	0	0
163	TPE	Meng Ju Lee	164	2015/2016 season (100%)	0	0	0	164	0
163	TPE	Meng Ju Lee	164	2014/2015 season (70%)	0	0	0	0	0
165	CAN	Mitchell Gordon	161	2016/2017 season (100%)	0	0	0	0	0
165	CAN	Mitchell Gordon	161	2015/2016 season (100%)	0	0	0	0	0
165	CAN	Mitchell Gordon	161	2014/2015 season (70%)	0	93	68	0	0
166	HUN	Kristof Forgo	153	2016/2017 season (100%)	0	0	0	0	0
166	HUN	Kristof Forgo	153	2015/2016 season (100%)	0	0	0	0	0
166	HUN	Kristof Forgo	153	2014/2015 season (70%)	0	0	0	153	0
167	ISR	Mark Gorodnitsky	152	2016/2017 season (100%)	55	97	0	0	0
167	ISR	Mark Gorodnitsky	152	2015/2016 season (100%)	0	0	0	0	0
167	ISR	Mark Gorodnitsky	152	2014/2015 season (70%)	0	0	0	0	0
168	CAN	Christophe Belley-Lemelin	144	2016/2017 season (100%)	0	0	0	0	0
168	CAN	Christophe Belley-Lemelin	144	2015/2016 season (100%)	0	0	0	144	0
168	CAN	Christophe Belley-Lemelin	144	2014/2015 season (70%)	0	0	0	0	0
168	KAZ	Artur Panikhin	144	2016/2017 season (100%)	0	0	0	0	0
168	KAZ	Artur Panikhin	144	2015/2016 season (100%)	0	0	0	144	0
168	KAZ	Artur Panikhin	144	2014/2015 season (70%)	0	0	0	0	0
170	GER	Thomas Stoll	141	2016/2017 season (100%)	44	97	0	0	0
170	GER	Thomas Stoll	141	2015/2016 season (100%)	0	0	0	0	0
170	GER	Thomas Stoll	141	2014/2015 season (70%)	0	0	0	0	0
171	GBR	Jack Newberry	139	2016/2017 season (100%)	0	0	0	0	0
171	GBR	Jack Newberry	139	2015/2016 season (100%)	0	0	0	0	0
171	GBR	Jack Newberry	139	2014/2015 season (70%)	0	0	0	139	0
171	RUS	Evgeni Vlasov	139	2016/2017 season (100%)	0	0	0	0	0
171	RUS	Evgeni Vlasov	139	2015/2016 season (100%)	0	0	0	0	0
171	RUS	Evgeni Vlasov	139	2014/2015 season (70%)	0	0	0	139	0
173	HKG	Harry Hau Yin Lee	135	2016/2017 season (100%)	0	0	0	0	0
173	HKG	Harry Hau Yin Lee	135	2015/2016 season (100%)	83	0	0	0	0
173	HKG	Harry Hau Yin Lee	135	2014/2015 season (70%)	52	0	0	0	0
174	RUS	Artur Gachinski	134	2016/2017 season (100%)	0	0	0	0	0
174	RUS	Artur Gachinski	134	2015/2016 season (100%)	0	0	0	0	0
174	RUS	Artur Gachinski	134	2014/2015 season (70%)	0	134	0	0	0
175	ESP	Aleix Gabara	133	2016/2017 season (100%)	0	0	0	0	0
175	ESP	Aleix Gabara	133	2015/2016 season (100%)	0	133	0	0	0
175	ESP	Aleix Gabara	133	2014/2015 season (70%)	0	0	0	0	0
175	PRK	Kum Chol Han	133	2016/2017 season (100%)	0	133	0	0	0
175	PRK	Kum Chol Han	133	2015/2016 season (100%)	0	0	0	0	0
175	PRK	Kum Chol Han	133	2014/2015 season (70%)	0	0	0	0	0
175	USA	Eric Sjoberg	133	2016/2017 season (100%)	0	133	0	0	0
175	USA	Eric Sjoberg	133	2015/2016 season (100%)	0	0	0	0	0
175	USA	Eric Sjoberg	133	2014/2015 season (70%)	0	0	0	0	0
178	GEO	Armen Agaian	127	2016/2017 season (100%)	0	0	0	0	0
178	GEO	Armen Agaian	127	2015/2016 season (100%)	0	0	0	0	0
178	GEO	Armen Agaian	127	2014/2015 season (70%)	0	0	0	127	0
179	RUS	Sergei Borodulin	125	2016/2017 season (100%)	0	0	0	0	0
179	RUS	Sergei Borodulin	125	2015/2016 season (100%)	0	0	0	0	0
179	RUS	Sergei Borodulin	125	2014/2015 season (70%)	0	0	0	125	0
179	SVK	Marco Klepoch	125	2016/2017 season (100%)	0	0	0	0	0
179	SVK	Marco Klepoch	125	2015/2016 season (100%)	0	0	0	0	0
179	SVK	Marco Klepoch	125	2014/2015 season (70%)	0	0	0	125	0
179	CAN	Andrei Rogozine	125	2016/2017 season (100%)	0	0	0	0	0
179	CAN	Andrei Rogozine	125	2015/2016 season (100%)	0	0	0	0	0
179	CAN	Andrei Rogozine	125	2014/2015 season (70%)	0	0	0	125	0
182	CHN	Yuheng Li	120	2016/2017 season (100%)	0	120	0	0	0
182	CHN	Yuheng Li	120	2015/2016 season (100%)	0	0	0	0	0
182	CHN	Yuheng Li	120	2014/2015 season (70%)	0	0	0	0	0
182	JPN	Sena Miyake	120	2016/2017 season (100%)	0	0	0	0	0
182	JPN	Sena Miyake	120	2015/2016 season (100%)	0	120	0	0	0
182	JPN	Sena Miyake	120	2014/2015 season (70%)	0	0	0	0	0
184	NED	Thomas Kennes	115	2016/2017 season (100%)	0	0	0	0	0
184	NED	Thomas Kennes	115	2015/2016 season (100%)	0	0	0	0	0
184	NED	Thomas Kennes	115	2014/2015 season (70%)	0	0	0	115	0
185	SVK	Jakub Krsnak	112	2016/2017 season (100%)	0	0	0	0	0
185	SVK	Jakub Krsnak	112	2015/2016 season (100%)	0	0	0	0	0
185	SVK	Jakub Krsnak	112	2014/2015 season (70%)	0	0	0	112	0
186	MEX	Donovan Carrillo	108	2016/2017 season (100%)	0	108	0	0	0
186	MEX	Donovan Carrillo	108	2015/2016 season (100%)	0	0	0	0	0
186	MEX	Donovan Carrillo	108	2014/2015 season (70%)	0	0	0	0	0
186	CAN	Edrian Paul Celestino	108	2016/2017 season (100%)	0	108	0	0	0
186	CAN	Edrian Paul Celestino	108	2015/2016 season (100%)	0	0	0	0	0
186	CAN	Edrian Paul Celestino	108	2014/2015 season (70%)	0	0	0	0	0
186	USA	William Hubbart	108	2016/2017 season (100%)	0	108	0	0	0
186	USA	William Hubbart	108	2015/2016 season (100%)	0	0	0	0	0
186	USA	William Hubbart	108	2014/2015 season (70%)	0	0	0	0	0
186	JPN	Yuto Kishina	108	2016/2017 season (100%)	0	108	0	0	0
186	JPN	Yuto Kishina	108	2015/2016 season (100%)	0	0	0	0	0
186	JPN	Yuto Kishina	108	2014/2015 season (70%)	0	0	0	0	0
186	CHN	Yunda Lu	108	2016/2017 season (100%)	0	0	0	0	0
186	CHN	Yunda Lu	108	2015/2016 season (100%)	0	108	0	0	0
186	CHN	Yunda Lu	108	2014/2015 season (70%)	0	0	0	0	0
186	USA	Camden Pulkinen	108	2016/2017 season (100%)	0	108	0	0	0
186	USA	Camden Pulkinen	108	2015/2016 season (100%)	0	0	0	0	0
186	USA	Camden Pulkinen	108	2014/2015 season (70%)	0	0	0	0	0
186	RUS	Vladislav Tarasenko	108	2016/2017 season (100%)	0	0	0	0	0
186	RUS	Vladislav Tarasenko	108	2015/2016 season (100%)	0	108	0	0	0
186	RUS	Vladislav Tarasenko	108	2014/2015 season (70%)	0	0	0	0	0
193	AUS	Mark Webster	102	2016/2017 season (100%)	102	0	0	0	0
193	AUS	Mark Webster	102	2015/2016 season (100%)	0	0	0	0	0
193	AUS	Mark Webster	102	2014/2015 season (70%)	0	0	0	0	0
194	FIN	Bela Papp	101	2016/2017 season (100%)	0	0	0	0	0
194	FIN	Bela Papp	101	2015/2016 season (100%)	0	0	0	0	0
194	FIN	Bela Papp	101	2014/2015 season (70%)	0	0	0	101	0
194	GER	Joti Polizoakis	101	2016/2017 season (100%)	0	0	0	0	0
194	GER	Joti Polizoakis	101	2015/2016 season (100%)	0	0	0	0	0
194	GER	Joti Polizoakis	101	2014/2015 season (70%)	0	0	0	101	0
196	USA	Anthony Boucher	97	2016/2017 season (100%)	0	0	0	0	0
196	USA	Anthony Boucher	97	2015/2016 season (100%)	0	97	0	0	0
196	USA	Anthony Boucher	97	2014/2015 season (70%)	0	0	0	0	0
196	FRA	Luc Economides	97	2016/2017 season (100%)	0	97	0	0	0
196	FRA	Luc Economides	97	2015/2016 season (100%)	0	0	0	0	0
196	FRA	Luc Economides	97	2014/2015 season (70%)	0	0	0	0	0
196	SWE	Nikolaj Majorov	97	2016/2017 season (100%)	0	97	0	0	0
196	SWE	Nikolaj Majorov	97	2015/2016 season (100%)	0	0	0	0	0
196	SWE	Nikolaj Majorov	97	2014/2015 season (70%)	0	0	0	0	0
196	SWE	Illya Solomin	97	2016/2017 season (100%)	0	0	0	0	0
196	SWE	Illya Solomin	97	2015/2016 season (100%)	0	97	0	0	0
196	SWE	Illya Solomin	97	2014/2015 season (70%)	0	0	0	0	0
200	USA	Paolo Borromeo	93	2016/2017 season (100%)	0	0	0	0	0
200	USA	Paolo Borromeo	93	2015/2016 season (100%)	0	0	0	0	0
200	USA	Paolo Borromeo	93	2014/2015 season (70%)	0	93	0	0	0
201	MAS	Kai Xiang Chew	83	2016/2017 season (100%)	83	0	0	0	0
201	MAS	Kai Xiang Chew	83	2015/2016 season (100%)	0	0	0	0	0
201	MAS	Kai Xiang Chew	83	2014/2015 season (70%)	0	0	0	0	0
202	USA	Chase Belmontes	76	2016/2017 season (100%)	0	0	0	0	0
202	USA	Chase Belmontes	76	2015/2016 season (100%)	0	0	0	0	0
202	USA	Chase Belmontes	76	2014/2015 season (70%)	0	76	0	0	0
202	USA	Daniel Kulenkamp	76	2016/2017 season (100%)	0	0	0	0	0
202	USA	Daniel Kulenkamp	76	2015/2016 season (100%)	0	0	0	0	0
202	USA	Daniel Kulenkamp	76	2014/2015 season (70%)	0	76	0	0	0
202	BUL	Nicky Obreykov	76	2016/2017 season (100%)	0	0	0	0	0
202	BUL	Nicky Obreykov	76	2015/2016 season (100%)	0	0	0	0	0
202	BUL	Nicky Obreykov	76	2014/2015 season (70%)	0	76	0	0	0
202	USA	Luke West	76	2016/2017 season (100%)	0	0	0	0	0
202	USA	Luke West	76	2015/2016 season (100%)	0	0	0	0	0
202	USA	Luke West	76	2014/2015 season (70%)	0	76	0	0	0
206	TPE	Micah Tang	74	2016/2017 season (100%)	74	0	0	0	0
206	TPE	Micah Tang	74	2015/2016 season (100%)	0	0	0	0	0
206	TPE	Micah Tang	74	2014/2015 season (70%)	0	0	0	0	0
207	CHN	Yuhang Guan	71	2016/2017 season (100%)	0	0	0	0	0
207	CHN	Yuhang Guan	71	2015/2016 season (100%)	0	0	0	0	0
207	CHN	Yuhang Guan	71	2014/2015 season (70%)	71	0	0	0	0
208	JPN	Kento Kajita	68	2016/2017 season (100%)	0	0	0	0	0
208	JPN	Kento Kajita	68	2015/2016 season (100%)	0	0	0	0	0
208	JPN	Kento Kajita	68	2014/2015 season (70%)	0	68	0	0	0
209	GBR	Josh Brown	49	2016/2017 season (100%)	0	0	0	0	0
209	GBR	Josh Brown	49	2015/2016 season (100%)	49	0	0	0	0
209	GBR	Josh Brown	49	2014/2015 season (70%)	0	0	0	0	0

==== Ladies' singles (244 skaters) ====
As of 31 March 2017

Rank	Nation	Skater	Points	Season	ISU Championships or Olympics	(Junior) Grand Prix and Final		Selected International Competition	
Rank	Nation	Skater	Points	Season	Best	Best	2nd Best	Best	2nd Best
1	RUS	Evgenia Medvedeva	5100	2016/2017 season (100%)	1200	800	400	0	0
1	RUS	Evgenia Medvedeva	5100	2015/2016 season (100%)	1200	800	400	300	0
1	RUS	Evgenia Medvedeva	5100	2014/2015 season (70%)	350	245	175	0	0
2	JPN	Satoko Miyahara	4606	2016/2017 season (100%)	0	720	360	300	0
2	JPN	Satoko Miyahara	4606	2015/2016 season (100%)	840	720	400	300	0
2	JPN	Satoko Miyahara	4606	2014/2015 season (70%)	756	227	227	210	0
3	RUS	Anna Pogorilaya	4289	2016/2017 season (100%)	756	648	400	243	0
3	RUS	Anna Pogorilaya	4289	2015/2016 season (100%)	972	292	0	300	270
3	RUS	Anna Pogorilaya	4289	2014/2015 season (70%)	476	408	280	0	0
4	USA	Ashley Wagner	3555	2016/2017 season (100%)	638	400	236	0	0
4	USA	Ashley Wagner	3555	2015/2016 season (100%)	1080	583	400	0	0
4	USA	Ashley Wagner	3555	2014/2015 season (70%)	551	454	252	0	0
5	RUS	Elizaveta Tuktamysheva	3516	2016/2017 season (100%)	0	324	292	270	270
5	RUS	Elizaveta Tuktamysheva	3516	2015/2016 season (100%)	0	360	262	300	300
5	RUS	Elizaveta Tuktamysheva	3516	2014/2015 season (70%)	840	560	280	210	210
6	RUS	Elena Radionova	3460	2016/2017 season (100%)	0	472	400	0	0
6	RUS	Elena Radionova	3460	2015/2016 season (100%)	756	648	400	0	0
6	RUS	Elena Radionova	3460	2014/2015 season (70%)	680	504	280	0	0
7	USA	Mirai Nagasu	3370	2016/2017 season (100%)	680	262	0	300	243
7	USA	Mirai Nagasu	3370	2015/2016 season (100%)	756	262	0	300	198
7	USA	Mirai Nagasu	3370	2014/2015 season (70%)	0	204	165	139	0
8	CAN	Kaetlyn Osmond	3355	2016/2017 season (100%)	1080	583	360	300	0
8	CAN	Kaetlyn Osmond	3355	2015/2016 season (100%)	496	236	0	300	0
8	CAN	Kaetlyn Osmond	3355	2014/2015 season (70%)	0	0	0	0	0
9	JPN	Rika Hongo	3347	2016/2017 season (100%)	325	262	236	250	219
9	JPN	Rika Hongo	3347	2015/2016 season (100%)	680	360	262	300	0
9	JPN	Rika Hongo	3347	2014/2015 season (70%)	496	330	280	170	0
10	USA	Gracie Gold	3303	2016/2017 season (100%)	0	262	191	178	0
10	USA	Gracie Gold	3303	2015/2016 season (100%)	875	525	400	0	0
10	USA	Gracie Gold	3303	2014/2015 season (70%)	613	280	227	170	0
11	CAN	Gabrielle Daleman	3243	2016/2017 season (100%)	972	292	292	243	0
11	CAN	Gabrielle Daleman	3243	2015/2016 season (100%)	517	262	236	219	0
11	CAN	Gabrielle Daleman	3243	2014/2015 season (70%)	312	183	165	210	0
12	RUS	Maria Sotskova	3112	2016/2017 season (100%)	612	525	360	300	0
12	RUS	Maria Sotskova	3112	2015/2016 season (100%)	450	315	250	300	0
12	RUS	Maria Sotskova	3112	2014/2015 season (70%)	230	178	175	0	0
13	USA	Karen Chen	2977	2016/2017 season (100%)	875	236	213	243	160
13	USA	Karen Chen	2977	2015/2016 season (100%)	264	262	262	243	219
13	USA	Karen Chen	2977	2014/2015 season (70%)	167	158	142	0	0
14	KAZ	Elizabet Tursynbaeva	2795	2016/2017 season (100%)	517	262	191	243	160
14	KAZ	Elizabet Tursynbaeva	2795	2015/2016 season (100%)	377	292	213	270	270
14	KAZ	Elizabet Tursynbaeva	2795	2014/2015 season (70%)	256	158	142	0	0
15	ITA	Roberta Rodeghiero	2570	2016/2017 season (100%)	362	191	0	219	144
15	ITA	Roberta Rodeghiero	2570	2015/2016 season (100%)	551	324	213	250	250
15	ITA	Roberta Rodeghiero	2570	2014/2015 season (70%)	281	0	0	210	175
16	JPN	Kanako Murakami	2421	2016/2017 season (100%)	0	0	0	178	0
16	JPN	Kanako Murakami	2421	2015/2016 season (100%)	446	292	292	160	0
16	JPN	Kanako Murakami	2421	2014/2015 season (70%)	447	227	204	175	0
17	KOR	Soyoun Park	2339	2016/2017 season (100%)	0	262	191	219	198
17	KOR	Soyoun Park	2339	2015/2016 season (100%)	612	191	0	219	0
17	KOR	Soyoun Park	2339	2014/2015 season (70%)	264	183	183	0	0
18	LAT	Angelina Kuchvalska	2318	2016/2017 season (100%)	131	0	0	250	225
18	LAT	Angelina Kuchvalska	2318	2015/2016 season (100%)	612	213	0	270	250
18	LAT	Angelina Kuchvalska	2318	2014/2015 season (70%)	312	93	93	210	175
19	SVK	Nicole Rajicová	2292	2016/2017 season (100%)	496	213	0	198	0
19	SVK	Nicole Rajicová	2292	2015/2016 season (100%)	339	213	213	198	0
19	SVK	Nicole Rajicová	2292	2014/2015 season (70%)	205	127	127	170	125
20	KOR	Dabin Choi	2287	2016/2017 season (100%)	551	213	0	225	219
20	KOR	Dabin Choi	2287	2015/2016 season (100%)	402	203	203	144	0
20	KOR	Dabin Choi	2287	2014/2015 season (70%)	151	127	115	0	0
21	JPN	Mai Mihara	2206	2016/2017 season (100%)	840	324	292	300	0
21	JPN	Mai Mihara	2206	2015/2016 season (100%)	0	225	225	0	0
21	JPN	Mai Mihara	2206	2014/2015 season (70%)	0	104	0	0	0
22	JPN	Wakaba Higuchi	2163	2016/2017 season (100%)	418	324	292	300	0
22	JPN	Wakaba Higuchi	2163	2015/2016 season (100%)	405	225	164	0	0
22	JPN	Wakaba Higuchi	2163	2014/2015 season (70%)	284	199	175	0	0
23	CAN	Alaine Chartrand	2102	2016/2017 season (100%)	293	262	0	270	0
23	CAN	Alaine Chartrand	2102	2015/2016 season (100%)	293	236	0	219	0
23	CAN	Alaine Chartrand	2102	2014/2015 season (70%)	293	227	149	153	0
24	FRA	Laurine Lecavelier	2087	2016/2017 season (100%)	551	236	0	250	250
24	FRA	Laurine Lecavelier	2087	2015/2016 season (100%)	325	0	0	250	225
24	FRA	Laurine Lecavelier	2087	2014/2015 season (70%)	228	0	0	142	115
25	JPN	Mao Asada	2016	2016/2017 season (100%)	0	236	0	270	0
25	JPN	Mao Asada	2016	2015/2016 season (100%)	638	472	400	0	0
25	JPN	Mao Asada	2016	2014/2015 season (70%)	0	0	0	0	0
26	RUS	Yulia Lipnitskaya	2006	2016/2017 season (100%)	0	0	0	270	0
26	RUS	Yulia Lipnitskaya	2006	2015/2016 season (100%)	0	360	236	270	250
26	RUS	Yulia Lipnitskaya	2006	2014/2015 season (70%)	0	368	252	0	0
27	RUS	Serafima Sakhanovich	1994	2016/2017 season (100%)	0	213	0	270	178
27	RUS	Serafima Sakhanovich	1994	2015/2016 season (100%)	0	133	0	270	219
27	RUS	Serafima Sakhanovich	1994	2014/2015 season (70%)	315	221	175	0	0
28	HUN	Ivett Tóth	1972	2016/2017 season (100%)	402	0	0	250	225
28	HUN	Ivett Tóth	1972	2015/2016 season (100%)	293	148	120	225	225
28	HUN	Ivett Tóth	1972	2014/2015 season (70%)	0	84	0	175	170
29	JPN	Marin Honda	1934	2016/2017 season (100%)	450	225	225	0	0
29	JPN	Marin Honda	1934	2015/2016 season (100%)	500	284	250	0	0
29	JPN	Marin Honda	1934	2014/2015 season (70%)	0	0	0	0	0
30	USA	Mariah Bell	1877	2016/2017 season (100%)	496	360	0	270	243
30	USA	Mariah Bell	1877	2015/2016 season (100%)	0	191	0	178	0
30	USA	Mariah Bell	1877	2014/2015 season (70%)	0	0	0	139	101
31	RUS	Alena Leonova	1751	2016/2017 season (100%)	0	0	0	243	182
31	RUS	Alena Leonova	1751	2015/2016 season (100%)	0	191	191	270	250
31	RUS	Alena Leonova	1751	2014/2015 season (70%)	0	252	165	189	153
32	USA	Courtney Hicks	1734	2016/2017 season (100%)	0	324	0	178	0
32	USA	Courtney Hicks	1734	2015/2016 season (100%)	0	360	236	243	0
32	USA	Courtney Hicks	1734	2014/2015 season (70%)	0	204	204	189	0
33	CHN	Zijun Li	1725	2016/2017 season (100%)	446	292	191	0	0
33	CHN	Zijun Li	1725	2015/2016 season (100%)	418	213	0	0	0
33	CHN	Zijun Li	1725	2014/2015 season (70%)	386	165	149	0	0
34	FRA	Maé-Bérénice Méité	1714	2016/2017 season (100%)	173	213	0	250	225
34	FRA	Maé-Bérénice Méité	1714	2015/2016 season (100%)	496	0	0	0	0
34	FRA	Maé-Bérénice Méité	1714	2014/2015 season (70%)	347	183	0	0	0
35	GER	Nicole Schott	1690	2016/2017 season (100%)	325	0	0	300	250
35	GER	Nicole Schott	1690	2015/2016 season (100%)	0	0	0	219	182
35	GER	Nicole Schott	1690	2014/2015 season (70%)	253	93	68	175	142
36	USA	Polina Edmunds	1664	2016/2017 season (100%)	0	0	0	0	0
36	USA	Polina Edmunds	1664	2015/2016 season (100%)	0	292	236	0	0
36	USA	Polina Edmunds	1664	2014/2015 season (70%)	588	204	134	210	0
37	SWE	Joshi Helgesson	1661	2016/2017 season (100%)	214	0	0	182	182
37	SWE	Joshi Helgesson	1661	2015/2016 season (100%)	362	0	0	250	250
37	SWE	Joshi Helgesson	1661	2014/2015 season (70%)	428	0	0	189	175
38	JPN	Yuka Nagai	1609	2016/2017 season (100%)	0	0	0	0	0
38	JPN	Yuka Nagai	1609	2015/2016 season (100%)	0	324	191	250	178
38	JPN	Yuka Nagai	1609	2014/2015 season (70%)	347	161	158	0	0
39	JPN	Yuna Shiraiwa	1600	2016/2017 season (100%)	328	225	182	0	0
39	JPN	Yuna Shiraiwa	1600	2015/2016 season (100%)	365	250	250	0	0
39	JPN	Yuna Shiraiwa	1600	2014/2015 season (70%)	0	0	0	0	0
40	JPN	Kaori Sakamoto	1553	2016/2017 season (100%)	405	284	250	0	0
40	JPN	Kaori Sakamoto	1553	2015/2016 season (100%)	0	225	182	0	0
40	JPN	Kaori Sakamoto	1553	2014/2015 season (70%)	207	93	0	0	0
41	ARM	Anastasia Galustyan	1508	2016/2017 season (100%)	264	0	0	203	0
41	ARM	Anastasia Galustyan	1508	2015/2016 season (100%)	192	108	0	243	225
41	ARM	Anastasia Galustyan	1508	2014/2015 season (70%)	166	84	0	189	158
42	SWE	Matilda Algotsson	1482	2016/2017 season (100%)	237	97	0	182	182
42	SWE	Matilda Algotsson	1482	2015/2016 season (100%)	237	133	0	250	164
42	SWE	Matilda Algotsson	1482	2014/2015 season (70%)	0	0	0	0	0
43	GER	Nathalie Weinzierl	1401	2016/2017 season (100%)	156	0	0	225	203
43	GER	Nathalie Weinzierl	1401	2015/2016 season (100%)	446	0	0	178	164
43	GER	Nathalie Weinzierl	1401	2014/2015 season (70%)	185	0	0	139	112
44	KOR	Nahyun Kim	1384	2016/2017 season (100%)	0	191	0	270	178
44	KOR	Nahyun Kim	1384	2015/2016 season (100%)	362	148	120	0	0
44	KOR	Nahyun Kim	1384	2014/2015 season (70%)	0	115	104	0	0
45	FIN	Viveca Lindfors	1350	2016/2017 season (100%)	127	0	0	0	0
45	FIN	Viveca Lindfors	1350	2015/2016 season (100%)	402	108	0	225	219
45	FIN	Viveca Lindfors	1350	2014/2015 season (70%)	0	0	0	142	127
46	AUS	Kailani Craine	1339	2016/2017 season (100%)	173	0	0	270	203
46	AUS	Kailani Craine	1339	2015/2016 season (100%)	237	120	0	164	160
46	AUS	Kailani Craine	1339	2014/2015 season (70%)	185	0	0	158	0
47	RUS	Polina Tsurskaya	1294	2016/2017 season (100%)	194	250	250	0	0
47	RUS	Polina Tsurskaya	1294	2015/2016 season (100%)	0	350	250	0	0
47	RUS	Polina Tsurskaya	1294	2014/2015 season (70%)	0	0	0	0	0
48	ITA	Carolina Kostner	1259	2016/2017 season (100%)	709	0	0	300	250
48	ITA	Carolina Kostner	1259	2015/2016 season (100%)	0	0	0	0	0
48	ITA	Carolina Kostner	1259	2014/2015 season (70%)	0	0	0	0	0
49	GER	Lutricia Bock	1253	2016/2017 season (100%)	0	133	0	164	160
49	GER	Lutricia Bock	1253	2015/2016 season (100%)	0	0	0	250	225
49	GER	Lutricia Bock	1253	2014/2015 season (70%)	89	127	76	189	158
50	ITA	Giada Russo	1238	2016/2017 season (100%)	0	0	0	250	225
50	ITA	Giada Russo	1238	2015/2016 season (100%)	214	0	0	250	225
50	ITA	Giada Russo	1238	2014/2015 season (70%)	74	0	0	158	158
51	AUS	Brooklee Han	1120	2016/2017 season (100%)	214	0	0	0	0
51	AUS	Brooklee Han	1120	2015/2016 season (100%)	156	0	0	178	160
51	AUS	Brooklee Han	1120	2014/2015 season (70%)	109	134	0	153	125
52	RUS	Alina Zagitova	1100	2016/2017 season (100%)	500	350	250	0	0
52	RUS	Alina Zagitova	1100	2015/2016 season (100%)	0	0	0	0	0
52	RUS	Alina Zagitova	1100	2014/2015 season (70%)	0	0	0	0	0
53	GER	Lea Johanna Dastich	1099	2016/2017 season (100%)	239	120	0	203	0
53	GER	Lea Johanna Dastich	1099	2015/2016 season (100%)	157	0	0	203	0
53	GER	Lea Johanna Dastich	1099	2014/2015 season (70%)	0	93	84	0	0
53	CZE	Michaela-Lucie Hanzlikova	1099	2016/2017 season (100%)	113	133	108	182	164
53	CZE	Michaela-Lucie Hanzlikova	1099	2015/2016 season (100%)	0	120	97	182	0
53	CZE	Michaela-Lucie Hanzlikova	1099	2014/2015 season (70%)	0	0	0	0	0
55	USA	Angela Wang	1076	2016/2017 season (100%)	0	0	0	250	0
55	USA	Angela Wang	1076	2015/2016 season (100%)	0	191	0	243	203
55	USA	Angela Wang	1076	2014/2015 season (70%)	0	0	0	189	170
56	NOR	Anne Line Gjersem	1040	2016/2017 season (100%)	74	0	0	164	164
56	NOR	Anne Line Gjersem	1040	2015/2016 season (100%)	156	0	0	243	144
56	NOR	Anne Line Gjersem	1040	2014/2015 season (70%)	155	0	0	158	0
57	JPN	Mariko Kihara	1032	2016/2017 season (100%)	0	0	0	198	0
57	JPN	Mariko Kihara	1032	2015/2016 season (100%)	0	0	0	250	178
57	JPN	Mariko Kihara	1032	2014/2015 season (70%)	0	127	104	175	0
58	BRA	Isadora Williams	1023	2016/2017 season (100%)	0	0	0	250	225
58	BRA	Isadora Williams	1023	2015/2016 season (100%)	0	0	0	225	225
58	BRA	Isadora Williams	1023	2014/2015 season (70%)	98	0	0	101	0
59	SWE	Isabelle Olsson	1016	2016/2017 season (100%)	0	0	0	250	0
59	SWE	Isabelle Olsson	1016	2015/2016 season (100%)	74	0	0	300	203
59	SWE	Isabelle Olsson	1016	2014/2015 season (70%)	0	0	0	189	142
60	TPE	Amy Lin	1011	2016/2017 season (100%)	156	0	0	203	0
60	TPE	Amy Lin	1011	2015/2016 season (100%)	192	97	0	203	160
60	TPE	Amy Lin	1011	2014/2015 season (70%)	0	0	0	0	0
61	RUS	Stanislava Konstantinova	1002	2016/2017 season (100%)	295	225	182	300	0
61	RUS	Stanislava Konstantinova	1002	2015/2016 season (100%)	0	0	0	0	0
61	RUS	Stanislava Konstantinova	1002	2014/2015 season (70%)	0	0	0	0	0
62	AUT	Kerstin Frank	996	2016/2017 season (100%)	92	0	0	225	0
62	AUT	Kerstin Frank	996	2015/2016 season (100%)	92	0	0	225	203
62	AUT	Kerstin Frank	996	2014/2015 season (70%)	109	0	0	142	127
63	JPN	Rin Nitaya	995	2016/2017 season (100%)	0	203	182	0	0
63	JPN	Rin Nitaya	995	2015/2016 season (100%)	0	203	182	225	0
63	JPN	Rin Nitaya	995	2014/2015 season (70%)	0	158	127	0	0
64	RUS	Maria Artemieva	992	2016/2017 season (100%)	0	0	0	0	0
64	RUS	Maria Artemieva	992	2015/2016 season (100%)	0	0	0	270	243
64	RUS	Maria Artemieva	992	2014/2015 season (70%)	0	165	0	189	125
65	FIN	Jenni Saarinen	972	2016/2017 season (100%)	0	0	0	182	0
65	FIN	Jenni Saarinen	972	2015/2016 season (100%)	0	0	0	182	182
65	FIN	Jenni Saarinen	972	2014/2015 season (70%)	99	76	76	175	170
66	FIN	Emmi Peltonen	961	2016/2017 season (100%)	293	164	0	250	178
66	FIN	Emmi Peltonen	961	2015/2016 season (100%)	0	0	0	0	0
66	FIN	Emmi Peltonen	961	2014/2015 season (70%)	0	76	0	0	0
67	CZE	Eliška Brezinová	938	2016/2017 season (100%)	0	0	0	182	164
67	CZE	Eliška Brezinová	938	2015/2016 season (100%)	83	0	0	250	0
67	CZE	Eliška Brezinová	938	2014/2015 season (70%)	134	0	0	125	115
68	LTU	Aleksandra Golovkina	928	2016/2017 season (100%)	0	0	0	0	0
68	LTU	Aleksandra Golovkina	928	2015/2016 season (100%)	173	0	0	198	160
68	LTU	Aleksandra Golovkina	928	2014/2015 season (70%)	88	0	0	170	139
69	SLO	Dasa Grm	927	2016/2017 season (100%)	0	0	0	203	203
69	SLO	Dasa Grm	927	2015/2016 season (100%)	0	0	0	203	178
69	SLO	Dasa Grm	927	2014/2015 season (70%)	140	0	0	175	158
70	BEL	Loena Hendrickx	921	2016/2017 season (100%)	446	0	0	250	225
70	BEL	Loena Hendrickx	921	2015/2016 season (100%)	0	0	0	0	0
70	BEL	Loena Hendrickx	921	2014/2015 season (70%)	0	0	0	0	0
71	JPN	Yura Matsuda	902	2016/2017 season (100%)	0	236	213	250	0
71	JPN	Yura Matsuda	902	2015/2016 season (100%)	0	203	0	0	0
71	JPN	Yura Matsuda	902	2014/2015 season (70%)	0	0	0	0	0
72	FIN	Liubov Efimenko	857	2016/2017 season (100%)	0	0	0	0	0
72	FIN	Liubov Efimenko	857	2015/2016 season (100%)	0	0	0	250	225
72	FIN	Liubov Efimenko	857	2014/2015 season (70%)	0	76	0	153	153
73	USA	Tyler Pierce	834	2016/2017 season (100%)	0	0	0	0	0
73	USA	Tyler Pierce	834	2015/2016 season (100%)	295	0	0	243	243
73	USA	Tyler Pierce	834	2014/2015 season (70%)	53	0	0	0	0
74	USA	Amber Glenn	827	2016/2017 season (100%)	0	0	0	219	198
74	USA	Amber Glenn	827	2015/2016 season (100%)	0	164	0	0	0
74	USA	Amber Glenn	827	2014/2015 season (70%)	0	142	104	0	0
75	HUN	Fruzsina Medgyesi	818	2016/2017 season (100%)	0	120	120	164	0
75	HUN	Fruzsina Medgyesi	818	2015/2016 season (100%)	0	0	0	250	164
75	HUN	Fruzsina Medgyesi	818	2014/2015 season (70%)	0	0	0	0	0
76	SWE	Anita Östlund	810	2016/2017 season (100%)	141	133	0	225	203
76	SWE	Anita Östlund	810	2015/2016 season (100%)	0	108	0	0	0
76	SWE	Anita Östlund	810	2014/2015 season (70%)	0	0	0	0	0
77	ITA	Micol Cristini	795	2016/2017 season (100%)	0	0	0	225	203
77	ITA	Micol Cristini	795	2015/2016 season (100%)	0	0	0	225	0
77	ITA	Micol Cristini	795	2014/2015 season (70%)	0	0	0	142	125
78	SWE	Viktoria Helgesson	789	2016/2017 season (100%)	0	0	0	0	0
78	SWE	Viktoria Helgesson	789	2015/2016 season (100%)	0	0	0	0	0
78	SWE	Viktoria Helgesson	789	2014/2015 season (70%)	386	149	0	153	101
79	RUS	Adelina Sotnikova	772	2016/2017 season (100%)	0	0	0	0	0
79	RUS	Adelina Sotnikova	772	2015/2016 season (100%)	0	324	0	270	178
79	RUS	Adelina Sotnikova	772	2014/2015 season (70%)	0	0	0	0	0
80	USA	Bradie Tennell	767	2016/2017 season (100%)	266	0	0	243	0
80	USA	Bradie Tennell	767	2015/2016 season (100%)	174	0	0	0	0
80	USA	Bradie Tennell	767	2014/2015 season (70%)	0	84	0	0	0
81	KOR	Eunsoo Lim	750	2016/2017 season (100%)	365	203	182	0	0
81	KOR	Eunsoo Lim	750	2015/2016 season (100%)	0	0	0	0	0
81	KOR	Eunsoo Lim	750	2014/2015 season (70%)	0	0	0	0	0
82	JPN	Miyu Nakashio	742	2016/2017 season (100%)	0	0	0	219	0
82	JPN	Miyu Nakashio	742	2015/2016 season (100%)	0	0	0	203	0
82	JPN	Miyu Nakashio	742	2014/2015 season (70%)	0	175	145	0	0
82	LAT	Diana Nikitina	742	2016/2017 season (100%)	0	133	0	0	0
82	LAT	Diana Nikitina	742	2015/2016 season (100%)	194	164	0	0	0
82	LAT	Diana Nikitina	742	2014/2015 season (70%)	136	115	0	0	0
84	LUX	Fleur Maxwell	738	2016/2017 season (100%)	0	0	0	0	0
84	LUX	Fleur Maxwell	738	2015/2016 season (100%)	140	0	0	203	0
84	LUX	Fleur Maxwell	738	2014/2015 season (70%)	79	0	0	158	158
85	CHN	Xiangning Li	737	2016/2017 season (100%)	305	0	0	0	0
85	CHN	Xiangning Li	737	2015/2016 season (100%)	68	148	148	0	0
85	CHN	Xiangning Li	737	2014/2015 season (70%)	43	68	0	0	0
86	CAN	Veronik Mallet	726	2016/2017 season (100%)	0	0	0	0	0
86	CAN	Veronik Mallet	726	2015/2016 season (100%)	214	0	0	250	0
86	CAN	Veronik Mallet	726	2014/2015 season (70%)	150	0	0	112	0
87	UKR	Anna Khnychenkova	714	2016/2017 season (100%)	102	0	0	250	0
87	UKR	Anna Khnychenkova	714	2015/2016 season (100%)	180	0	0	182	0
87	UKR	Anna Khnychenkova	714	2014/2015 season (70%)	0	0	0	0	0
88	JPN	Riona Kato	709	2016/2017 season (100%)	0	0	0	0	0
88	JPN	Riona Kato	709	2015/2016 season (100%)	0	0	0	198	0
88	JPN	Riona Kato	709	2014/2015 season (70%)	0	183	0	170	158
89	ITA	Ilaria Nogaro	698	2016/2017 season (100%)	0	0	0	164	0
89	ITA	Ilaria Nogaro	698	2015/2016 season (100%)	0	0	0	225	182
89	ITA	Ilaria Nogaro	698	2014/2015 season (70%)	0	0	0	127	0
90	EST	Helery Hälvin	682	2016/2017 season (100%)	192	0	0	0	0
90	EST	Helery Hälvin	682	2015/2016 season (100%)	126	0	0	182	182
90	EST	Helery Hälvin	682	2014/2015 season (70%)	0	0	0	0	0
91	GBR	Natasha McKay	640	2016/2017 season (100%)	140	0	0	250	250
91	GBR	Natasha McKay	640	2015/2016 season (100%)	0	0	0	0	0
91	GBR	Natasha McKay	640	2014/2015 season (70%)	0	0	0	0	0
92	RUS	Diana Pervushkina	639	2016/2017 season (100%)	0	0	0	0	0
92	RUS	Diana Pervushkina	639	2015/2016 season (100%)	0	203	182	0	0
92	RUS	Diana Pervushkina	639	2014/2015 season (70%)	0	115	0	139	0
93	JPN	Haruka Imai	632	2016/2017 season (100%)	0	0	0	0	0
93	JPN	Haruka Imai	632	2015/2016 season (100%)	0	0	0	225	0
93	JPN	Haruka Imai	632	2014/2015 season (70%)	0	134	134	139	0
94	RUS	Alisa Fedichkina	628	2016/2017 season (100%)	0	148	0	0	0
94	RUS	Alisa Fedichkina	628	2015/2016 season (100%)	0	255	225	0	0
94	RUS	Alisa Fedichkina	628	2014/2015 season (70%)	0	0	0	0	0
95	AUT	Natalie Klotz	596	2016/2017 season (100%)	0	0	0	250	182
95	AUT	Natalie Klotz	596	2015/2016 season (100%)	0	0	0	164	0
95	AUT	Natalie Klotz	596	2014/2015 season (70%)	0	0	0	0	0
96	CZE	Elizaveta Ukolova	590	2016/2017 season (100%)	0	0	0	0	0
96	CZE	Elizaveta Ukolova	590	2015/2016 season (100%)	0	97	0	225	203
96	CZE	Elizaveta Ukolova	590	2014/2015 season (70%)	65	0	0	0	0
97	NOR	Camilla Gjersem	589	2016/2017 season (100%)	0	0	0	0	0
97	NOR	Camilla Gjersem	589	2015/2016 season (100%)	0	0	0	250	0
97	NOR	Camilla Gjersem	589	2014/2015 season (70%)	71	0	0	153	115
98	FIN	Juulia Turkkila	579	2016/2017 season (100%)	0	0	0	0	0
98	FIN	Juulia Turkkila	579	2015/2016 season (100%)	0	0	0	178	164
98	FIN	Juulia Turkkila	579	2014/2015 season (70%)	0	0	0	125	112
99	USA	Hannah Miller	577	2016/2017 season (100%)	0	0	0	0	0
99	USA	Hannah Miller	577	2015/2016 season (100%)	0	0	0	178	0
99	USA	Hannah Miller	577	2014/2015 season (70%)	0	0	0	210	189
100	RUS	Anastasiia Gubanova	565	2016/2017 season (100%)	0	315	250	0	0
100	RUS	Anastasiia Gubanova	565	2015/2016 season (100%)	0	0	0	0	0
100	RUS	Anastasiia Gubanova	565	2014/2015 season (70%)	0	0	0	0	0
101	GBR	Kristen Spours	564	2016/2017 season (100%)	114	0	0	225	225
101	GBR	Kristen Spours	564	2015/2016 season (100%)	0	0	0	0	0
101	GBR	Kristen Spours	564	2014/2015 season (70%)	0	0	0	0	0
102	RSA	Michaela Du Toit	546	2016/2017 season (100%)	0	0	0	203	0
102	RSA	Michaela Du Toit	546	2015/2016 season (100%)	140	0	0	203	0
102	RSA	Michaela Du Toit	546	2014/2015 season (70%)	0	0	0	0	0
102	CZE	Anna Dušková	546	2016/2017 season (100%)	0	0	0	0	0
102	CZE	Anna Dušková	546	2015/2016 season (100%)	0	97	0	203	178
102	CZE	Anna Dušková	546	2014/2015 season (70%)	0	68	0	0	0
104	KOR	Ji Hyun Byun	545	2016/2017 season (100%)	0	0	0	160	0
104	KOR	Ji Hyun Byun	545	2015/2016 season (100%)	0	182	0	203	0
104	KOR	Ji Hyun Byun	545	2014/2015 season (70%)	0	0	0	0	0
105	KOR	Hanul Kim	527	2016/2017 season (100%)	0	164	148	0	0
105	KOR	Hanul Kim	527	2015/2016 season (100%)	215	0	0	0	0
105	KOR	Hanul Kim	527	2014/2015 season (70%)	0	0	0	0	0
106	KOR	Suh Hyun Son	517	2016/2017 season (100%)	126	0	0	0	0
106	KOR	Suh Hyun Son	517	2015/2016 season (100%)	49	0	0	182	160
106	KOR	Suh Hyun Son	517	2014/2015 season (70%)	0	0	0	0	0
107	ESP	Sonia Lafuente	516	2016/2017 season (100%)	0	0	0	164	0
107	ESP	Sonia Lafuente	516	2015/2016 season (100%)	0	0	0	0	0
107	ESP	Sonia Lafuente	516	2014/2015 season (70%)	98	0	0	142	112
108	JPN	Rika Kihira	505	2016/2017 season (100%)	0	255	250	0	0
108	JPN	Rika Kihira	505	2015/2016 season (100%)	0	0	0	0	0
108	JPN	Rika Kihira	505	2014/2015 season (70%)	0	0	0	0	0
109	KOR	Hae Jin Kim	503	2016/2017 season (100%)	0	0	0	164	0
109	KOR	Hae Jin Kim	503	2015/2016 season (100%)	0	0	0	0	0
109	KOR	Hae Jin Kim	503	2014/2015 season (70%)	205	134	0	0	0
110	CAN	Sarah Tamura	502	2016/2017 season (100%)	93	148	120	0	0
110	CAN	Sarah Tamura	502	2015/2016 season (100%)	141	0	0	0	0
110	CAN	Sarah Tamura	502	2014/2015 season (70%)	0	0	0	0	0
111	GBR	Karly Robertson	497	2016/2017 season (100%)	0	0	0	203	0
111	GBR	Karly Robertson	497	2015/2016 season (100%)	0	0	0	182	0
111	GBR	Karly Robertson	497	2014/2015 season (70%)	0	0	0	112	0
112	JPN	Yuna Aoki	479	2016/2017 season (100%)	0	182	164	0	0
112	JPN	Yuna Aoki	479	2015/2016 season (100%)	0	133	0	0	0
112	JPN	Yuna Aoki	479	2014/2015 season (70%)	0	0	0	0	0
112	HKG	Maisy Hiu Ching Ma	479	2016/2017 season (100%)	140	0	0	0	0
112	HKG	Maisy Hiu Ching Ma	479	2015/2016 season (100%)	114	0	0	225	0
112	HKG	Maisy Hiu Ching Ma	479	2014/2015 season (70%)	0	0	0	0	0
114	ITA	Guia Maria Tagliapietra	469	2016/2017 season (100%)	0	0	0	225	164
114	ITA	Guia Maria Tagliapietra	469	2015/2016 season (100%)	0	0	0	0	0
114	ITA	Guia Maria Tagliapietra	469	2014/2015 season (70%)	80	0	0	0	0
115	USA	Ashley Cain	468	2016/2017 season (100%)	0	0	0	0	0
115	USA	Ashley Cain	468	2015/2016 season (100%)	0	0	0	164	0
115	USA	Ashley Cain	468	2014/2015 season (70%)	0	134	0	170	0
116	USA	Paige Rydberg	459	2016/2017 season (100%)	0	0	0	198	0
116	USA	Paige Rydberg	459	2015/2016 season (100%)	0	164	97	0	0
116	USA	Paige Rydberg	459	2014/2015 season (70%)	0	0	0	0	0
117	RUS	Elizaveta Nugumanova	455	2016/2017 season (100%)	0	230	225	0	0
117	RUS	Elizaveta Nugumanova	455	2015/2016 season (100%)	0	0	0	0	0
117	RUS	Elizaveta Nugumanova	455	2014/2015 season (70%)	0	0	0	0	0
118	ESP	Valentina Matos	451	2016/2017 season (100%)	44	0	0	225	182
118	ESP	Valentina Matos	451	2015/2016 season (100%)	0	0	0	0	0
118	ESP	Valentina Matos	451	2014/2015 season (70%)	0	0	0	0	0
119	NED	Niki Wories	449	2016/2017 season (100%)	0	0	0	0	0
119	NED	Niki Wories	449	2015/2016 season (100%)	131	0	0	0	0
119	NED	Niki Wories	449	2014/2015 season (70%)	34	0	0	142	142
120	RUS	Alexandra Avstriyskaya	441	2016/2017 season (100%)	0	0	0	243	198
120	RUS	Alexandra Avstriyskaya	441	2015/2016 season (100%)	0	0	0	0	0
120	RUS	Alexandra Avstriyskaya	441	2014/2015 season (70%)	0	0	0	0	0
121	AUT	Lara Roth	428	2016/2017 season (100%)	0	0	0	203	0
121	AUT	Lara Roth	428	2015/2016 season (100%)	0	0	0	225	0
121	AUT	Lara Roth	428	2014/2015 season (70%)	0	0	0	0	0
122	EST	Gerli Liinamäe	410	2016/2017 season (100%)	0	0	0	182	0
122	EST	Gerli Liinamäe	410	2015/2016 season (100%)	0	0	0	164	0
122	EST	Gerli Liinamäe	410	2014/2015 season (70%)	64	0	0	0	0
123	EST	Johanna Allik	407	2016/2017 season (100%)	0	0	0	0	0
123	EST	Johanna Allik	407	2015/2016 season (100%)	0	0	0	225	182
123	EST	Johanna Allik	407	2014/2015 season (70%)	0	0	0	0	0
124	FIN	Hanna Kiviniemi	406	2016/2017 season (100%)	0	0	0	0	0
124	FIN	Hanna Kiviniemi	406	2015/2016 season (100%)	0	0	0	164	0
124	FIN	Hanna Kiviniemi	406	2014/2015 season (70%)	0	0	0	127	115
124	USA	Vivian Le	406	2016/2017 season (100%)	0	0	0	0	0
124	USA	Vivian Le	406	2015/2016 season (100%)	0	203	203	0	0
124	USA	Vivian Le	406	2014/2015 season (70%)	0	0	0	0	0
124	JPN	Mako Yamashita	406	2016/2017 season (100%)	0	203	203	0	0
124	JPN	Mako Yamashita	406	2015/2016 season (100%)	0	0	0	0	0
124	JPN	Mako Yamashita	406	2014/2015 season (70%)	0	0	0	0	0
127	FRA	Julie Froetscher	385	2016/2017 season (100%)	0	148	133	0	0
127	FRA	Julie Froetscher	385	2015/2016 season (100%)	0	0	0	0	0
127	FRA	Julie Froetscher	385	2014/2015 season (70%)	0	104	0	0	0
128	SGP	Chloe Ing	378	2016/2017 season (100%)	113	0	0	164	0
128	SGP	Chloe Ing	378	2015/2016 season (100%)	0	0	0	0	0
128	SGP	Chloe Ing	378	2014/2015 season (70%)	0	0	0	101	0
129	RUS	Ekaterina Mitrofanova	373	2016/2017 season (100%)	0	0	0	0	0
129	RUS	Ekaterina Mitrofanova	373	2015/2016 season (100%)	0	225	148	0	0
129	RUS	Ekaterina Mitrofanova	373	2014/2015 season (70%)	0	0	0	0	0
129	SGP	Shuran Yu	373	2016/2017 season (100%)	102	0	0	164	0
129	SGP	Shuran Yu	373	2015/2016 season (100%)	0	0	0	0	0
129	SGP	Shuran Yu	373	2014/2015 season (70%)	31	76	0	0	0
131	RUS	Alisa Lozko	367	2016/2017 season (100%)	0	203	164	0	0
131	RUS	Alisa Lozko	367	2015/2016 season (100%)	0	0	0	0	0
131	RUS	Alisa Lozko	367	2014/2015 season (70%)	0	0	0	0	0
131	CAN	Roxanne Rheault	367	2016/2017 season (100%)	0	0	0	0	0
131	CAN	Roxanne Rheault	367	2015/2016 season (100%)	0	0	0	203	164
131	CAN	Roxanne Rheault	367	2014/2015 season (70%)	0	0	0	0	0
131	ITA	Alessia Zardini	367	2016/2017 season (100%)	0	0	0	0	0
131	ITA	Alessia Zardini	367	2015/2016 season (100%)	0	0	0	203	164
131	ITA	Alessia Zardini	367	2014/2015 season (70%)	0	0	0	0	0
134	CHN	Ziquan Zhao	365	2016/2017 season (100%)	192	0	0	0	0
134	CHN	Ziquan Zhao	365	2015/2016 season (100%)	173	0	0	0	0
134	CHN	Ziquan Zhao	365	2014/2015 season (70%)	0	0	0	0	0
135	KAZ	Aiza Mambekova	361	2016/2017 season (100%)	0	120	97	0	0
135	KAZ	Aiza Mambekova	361	2015/2016 season (100%)	0	0	0	144	0
135	KAZ	Aiza Mambekova	361	2014/2015 season (70%)	0	0	0	0	0
136	KOR	So Hyun An	352	2016/2017 season (100%)	68	0	0	0	0
136	KOR	So Hyun An	352	2015/2016 season (100%)	0	164	120	0	0
136	KOR	So Hyun An	352	2014/2015 season (70%)	0	0	0	0	0
137	SRB	Antonina Dubinina	346	2016/2017 season (100%)	0	0	0	182	164
137	SRB	Antonina Dubinina	346	2015/2016 season (100%)	0	0	0	0	0
137	SRB	Antonina Dubinina	346	2014/2015 season (70%)	0	0	0	0	0
137	KOR	Ye Lim Kim	346	2016/2017 season (100%)	0	182	164	0	0
137	KOR	Ye Lim Kim	346	2015/2016 season (100%)	0	0	0	0	0
137	KOR	Ye Lim Kim	346	2014/2015 season (70%)	0	0	0	0	0
137	RUS	Valeria Mikhailova	346	2016/2017 season (100%)	0	0	0	0	0
137	RUS	Valeria Mikhailova	346	2015/2016 season (100%)	0	182	164	0	0
137	RUS	Valeria Mikhailova	346	2014/2015 season (70%)	0	0	0	0	0
137	GBR	Katie Powell	346	2016/2017 season (100%)	0	0	0	182	164
137	GBR	Katie Powell	346	2015/2016 season (100%)	0	0	0	0	0
137	GBR	Katie Powell	346	2014/2015 season (70%)	0	0	0	0	0
141	KOR	Yu Jin Choi	345	2016/2017 season (100%)	0	0	0	225	0
141	KOR	Yu Jin Choi	345	2015/2016 season (100%)	0	120	0	0	0
141	KOR	Yu Jin Choi	345	2014/2015 season (70%)	0	0	0	0	0
141	ROU	Julia Sauter	345	2016/2017 season (100%)	0	0	0	203	0
141	ROU	Julia Sauter	345	2015/2016 season (100%)	0	0	0	0	0
141	ROU	Julia Sauter	345	2014/2015 season (70%)	0	0	0	142	0
143	CAN	Selena Zhao	342	2016/2017 season (100%)	0	0	0	0	0
143	CAN	Selena Zhao	342	2015/2016 season (100%)	0	0	0	198	0
143	CAN	Selena Zhao	342	2014/2015 season (70%)	0	76	68	0	0
144	USA	Emily Chan	326	2016/2017 season (100%)	0	0	0	178	0
144	USA	Emily Chan	326	2015/2016 season (100%)	0	148	0	0	0
144	USA	Emily Chan	326	2014/2015 season (70%)	0	0	0	0	0
145	JPN	Miyabi Oba	323	2016/2017 season (100%)	0	0	0	0	0
145	JPN	Miyabi Oba	323	2015/2016 season (100%)	0	0	0	0	0
145	JPN	Miyabi Oba	323	2014/2015 season (70%)	0	165	0	158	0
146	SWE	Elin Hallberg	322	2016/2017 season (100%)	0	0	0	0	0
146	SWE	Elin Hallberg	322	2015/2016 season (100%)	0	0	0	164	0
146	SWE	Elin Hallberg	322	2014/2015 season (70%)	0	0	0	158	0
147	USA	Tessa Hong	312	2016/2017 season (100%)	0	164	0	0	0
147	USA	Tessa Hong	312	2015/2016 season (100%)	0	148	0	0	0
147	USA	Tessa Hong	312	2014/2015 season (70%)	0	0	0	0	0
147	HKG	Yi Christy Leung	312	2016/2017 season (100%)	215	97	0	0	0
147	HKG	Yi Christy Leung	312	2015/2016 season (100%)	0	0	0	0	0
147	HKG	Yi Christy Leung	312	2014/2015 season (70%)	0	0	0	0	0
149	ITA	Chiara Calderone	309	2016/2017 season (100%)	0	0	0	0	0
149	ITA	Chiara Calderone	309	2015/2016 season (100%)	0	0	0	182	0
149	ITA	Chiara Calderone	309	2014/2015 season (70%)	0	0	0	127	0
150	PHI	Alisson Krystle Perticheto	303	2016/2017 season (100%)	0	0	0	182	0
150	PHI	Alisson Krystle Perticheto	303	2015/2016 season (100%)	0	0	0	0	0
150	PHI	Alisson Krystle Perticheto	303	2014/2015 season (70%)	121	0	0	0	0
151	ITA	Sara Falotico	302	2016/2017 season (100%)	0	0	0	0	0
151	ITA	Sara Falotico	302	2015/2016 season (100%)	0	0	0	0	0
151	ITA	Sara Falotico	302	2014/2015 season (70%)	0	0	0	175	127
151	USA	Brynne McIsaac	302	2016/2017 season (100%)	0	120	0	0	0
151	USA	Brynne McIsaac	302	2015/2016 season (100%)	0	182	0	0	0
151	USA	Brynne McIsaac	302	2014/2015 season (70%)	0	0	0	0	0
153	RUS	Alexandra Proklova	284	2016/2017 season (100%)	0	0	0	0	0
153	RUS	Alexandra Proklova	284	2015/2016 season (100%)	0	0	0	0	0
153	RUS	Alexandra Proklova	284	2014/2015 season (70%)	0	142	142	0	0
154	USA	Megan Wessenberg	281	2016/2017 season (100%)	0	148	0	0	0
154	USA	Megan Wessenberg	281	2015/2016 season (100%)	0	133	0	0	0
154	USA	Megan Wessenberg	281	2014/2015 season (70%)	0	0	0	0	0
155	CAN	Larkyn Austman	271	2016/2017 season (100%)	0	0	0	203	0
155	CAN	Larkyn Austman	271	2015/2016 season (100%)	0	0	0	0	0
155	CAN	Larkyn Austman	271	2014/2015 season (70%)	0	68	0	0	0
156	RUS	Alsu Kaiumova	257	2016/2017 season (100%)	0	0	0	0	0
156	RUS	Alsu Kaiumova	257	2015/2016 season (100%)	0	0	0	0	0
156	RUS	Alsu Kaiumova	257	2014/2015 season (70%)	0	142	115	0	0
157	SWE	Linnea Mellgren	250	2016/2017 season (100%)	0	0	0	0	0
157	SWE	Linnea Mellgren	250	2015/2016 season (100%)	0	0	0	250	0
157	SWE	Linnea Mellgren	250	2014/2015 season (70%)	0	0	0	0	0
158	UKR	Natalia Popova	248	2016/2017 season (100%)	0	0	0	0	0
158	UKR	Natalia Popova	248	2015/2016 season (100%)	0	0	0	0	0
158	UKR	Natalia Popova	248	2014/2015 season (70%)	121	0	0	127	0
159	GEO	Elene Gedevanishvili	241	2016/2017 season (100%)	0	0	0	0	0
159	GEO	Elene Gedevanishvili	241	2015/2016 season (100%)	0	0	0	0	0
159	GEO	Elene Gedevanishvili	241	2014/2015 season (70%)	92	149	0	0	0
160	FIN	Anni Järvenpää	230	2016/2017 season (100%)	0	0	0	0	0
160	FIN	Anni Järvenpää	230	2015/2016 season (100%)	0	133	97	0	0
160	FIN	Anni Järvenpää	230	2014/2015 season (70%)	0	0	0	0	0
160	ISR	Elizaveta Yushchenko	230	2016/2017 season (100%)	0	0	0	0	0
160	ISR	Elizaveta Yushchenko	230	2015/2016 season (100%)	0	0	0	0	0
160	ISR	Elizaveta Yushchenko	230	2014/2015 season (70%)	0	115	115	0	0
162	USA	Leah Keiser	226	2016/2017 season (100%)	0	0	0	0	0
162	USA	Leah Keiser	226	2015/2016 season (100%)	0	0	0	0	0
162	USA	Leah Keiser	226	2014/2015 season (70%)	0	142	84	0	0
163	RUS	Evgenia Ivankova	225	2016/2017 season (100%)	0	0	0	225	0
163	RUS	Evgenia Ivankova	225	2015/2016 season (100%)	0	0	0	0	0
163	RUS	Evgenia Ivankova	225	2014/2015 season (70%)	0	0	0	0	0
163	AUT	Belinda Schönberger	225	2016/2017 season (100%)	0	0	0	0	0
163	AUT	Belinda Schönberger	225	2015/2016 season (100%)	0	0	0	225	0
163	AUT	Belinda Schönberger	225	2014/2015 season (70%)	0	0	0	0	0
163	USA	Caroline Zhang	225	2016/2017 season (100%)	0	0	0	225	0
163	USA	Caroline Zhang	225	2015/2016 season (100%)	0	0	0	0	0
163	USA	Caroline Zhang	225	2014/2015 season (70%)	0	0	0	0	0
166	GER	Sarah Hecken	216	2016/2017 season (100%)	0	0	0	0	0
166	GER	Sarah Hecken	216	2015/2016 season (100%)	0	0	0	0	0
166	GER	Sarah Hecken	216	2014/2015 season (70%)	0	0	0	115	101
166	FIN	Joanna Kallela	216	2016/2017 season (100%)	0	108	108	0	0
166	FIN	Joanna Kallela	216	2015/2016 season (100%)	0	0	0	0	0
166	FIN	Joanna Kallela	216	2014/2015 season (70%)	0	0	0	0	0
166	USA	Nina Ouellette	216	2016/2017 season (100%)	0	108	0	0	0
166	USA	Nina Ouellette	216	2015/2016 season (100%)	0	108	0	0	0
166	USA	Nina Ouellette	216	2014/2015 season (70%)	0	0	0	0	0
169	ITA	Lucrezia Gennaro	208	2016/2017 season (100%)	0	0	0	0	0
169	ITA	Lucrezia Gennaro	208	2015/2016 season (100%)	75	133	0	0	0
169	ITA	Lucrezia Gennaro	208	2014/2015 season (70%)	0	0	0	0	0
170	KOR	Sena Kim	203	2016/2017 season (100%)	0	0	0	203	0
170	KOR	Sena Kim	203	2015/2016 season (100%)	0	0	0	0	0
170	KOR	Sena Kim	203	2014/2015 season (70%)	0	0	0	0	0
170	ITA	Elisabetta Leccardi	203	2016/2017 season (100%)	83	120	0	0	0
170	ITA	Elisabetta Leccardi	203	2015/2016 season (100%)	0	0	0	0	0
170	ITA	Elisabetta Leccardi	203	2014/2015 season (70%)	0	0	0	0	0
170	GBR	Anna Litvinenko	203	2016/2017 season (100%)	0	0	0	203	0
170	GBR	Anna Litvinenko	203	2015/2016 season (100%)	0	0	0	0	0
170	GBR	Anna Litvinenko	203	2014/2015 season (70%)	0	0	0	0	0
170	TUR	Sıla Saygı	203	2016/2017 season (100%)	0	0	0	0	0
170	TUR	Sıla Saygı	203	2015/2016 season (100%)	0	0	0	203	0
170	TUR	Sıla Saygı	203	2014/2015 season (70%)	0	0	0	0	0
170	SUI	Yasmine Kimiko Yamada	203	2016/2017 season (100%)	0	0	0	0	0
170	SUI	Yasmine Kimiko Yamada	203	2015/2016 season (100%)	0	0	0	203	0
170	SUI	Yasmine Kimiko Yamada	203	2014/2015 season (70%)	0	0	0	0	0
175	UKR	Anastasia Gozhva	201	2016/2017 season (100%)	0	0	0	0	0
175	UKR	Anastasia Gozhva	201	2015/2016 season (100%)	93	108	0	0	0
175	UKR	Anastasia Gozhva	201	2014/2015 season (70%)	0	0	0	0	0
176	RUS	Natalia Ogoreltseva	198	2016/2017 season (100%)	0	0	0	198	0
176	RUS	Natalia Ogoreltseva	198	2015/2016 season (100%)	0	0	0	0	0
176	RUS	Natalia Ogoreltseva	198	2014/2015 season (70%)	0	0	0	0	0
177	MEX	Andrea Montesinos Cantu	183	2016/2017 season (100%)	75	108	0	0	0
177	MEX	Andrea Montesinos Cantu	183	2015/2016 season (100%)	0	0	0	0	0
177	MEX	Andrea Montesinos Cantu	183	2014/2015 season (70%)	0	0	0	0	0
178	GBR	Zoe Jones	182	2016/2017 season (100%)	0	0	0	0	0
178	GBR	Zoe Jones	182	2015/2016 season (100%)	0	0	0	182	0
178	GBR	Zoe Jones	182	2014/2015 season (70%)	0	0	0	0	0
178	KOR	Seo Young Lee	182	2016/2017 season (100%)	0	0	0	182	0
178	KOR	Seo Young Lee	182	2015/2016 season (100%)	0	0	0	0	0
178	KOR	Seo Young Lee	182	2014/2015 season (70%)	0	0	0	0	0
178	EST	Jelizaveta Leonova	182	2016/2017 season (100%)	0	0	0	0	0
178	EST	Jelizaveta Leonova	182	2015/2016 season (100%)	0	0	0	182	0
178	EST	Jelizaveta Leonova	182	2014/2015 season (70%)	0	0	0	0	0
178	GBR	Rowena Mackessack-Leitch	182	2016/2017 season (100%)	0	0	0	0	0
178	GBR	Rowena Mackessack-Leitch	182	2015/2016 season (100%)	0	0	0	182	0
178	GBR	Rowena Mackessack-Leitch	182	2014/2015 season (70%)	0	0	0	0	0
178	SWE	Natasja Remstedt	182	2016/2017 season (100%)	0	0	0	182	0
178	SWE	Natasja Remstedt	182	2015/2016 season (100%)	0	0	0	0	0
178	SWE	Natasja Remstedt	182	2014/2015 season (70%)	0	0	0	0	0
178	RUS	Sofia Samodurova	182	2016/2017 season (100%)	0	182	0	0	0
178	RUS	Sofia Samodurova	182	2015/2016 season (100%)	0	0	0	0	0
178	RUS	Sofia Samodurova	182	2014/2015 season (70%)	0	0	0	0	0
178	FIN	Emilia Toikkanen	182	2016/2017 season (100%)	0	0	0	0	0
178	FIN	Emilia Toikkanen	182	2015/2016 season (100%)	0	0	0	182	0
178	FIN	Emilia Toikkanen	182	2014/2015 season (70%)	0	0	0	0	0
178	USA	Maria Yang	182	2016/2017 season (100%)	0	0	0	0	0
178	USA	Maria Yang	182	2015/2016 season (100%)	0	0	0	182	0
178	USA	Maria Yang	182	2014/2015 season (70%)	0	0	0	0	0
186	CAN	Julianne Séguin	170	2016/2017 season (100%)	0	0	0	0	0
186	CAN	Julianne Séguin	170	2015/2016 season (100%)	0	0	0	0	0
186	CAN	Julianne Séguin	170	2014/2015 season (70%)	0	0	0	170	0
187	KOR	Song Joo Chea	166	2016/2017 season (100%)	0	0	0	0	0
187	KOR	Song Joo Chea	166	2015/2016 season (100%)	0	0	0	0	0
187	KOR	Song Joo Chea	166	2014/2015 season (70%)	166	0	0	0	0
188	RUS	Mariia Bessonova	164	2016/2017 season (100%)	0	0	0	164	0
188	RUS	Mariia Bessonova	164	2015/2016 season (100%)	0	0	0	0	0
188	RUS	Mariia Bessonova	164	2014/2015 season (70%)	0	0	0	0	0
188	ITA	Sara Casella	164	2016/2017 season (100%)	0	0	0	0	0
188	ITA	Sara Casella	164	2015/2016 season (100%)	0	164	0	0	0
188	ITA	Sara Casella	164	2014/2015 season (70%)	0	0	0	0	0
188	GER	Maria-Katharina Herceg	164	2016/2017 season (100%)	0	0	0	164	0
188	GER	Maria-Katharina Herceg	164	2015/2016 season (100%)	0	0	0	0	0
188	GER	Maria-Katharina Herceg	164	2014/2015 season (70%)	0	0	0	0	0
188	KOR	So Yeon Im	164	2016/2017 season (100%)	0	0	0	0	0
188	KOR	So Yeon Im	164	2015/2016 season (100%)	0	0	0	164	0
188	KOR	So Yeon Im	164	2014/2015 season (70%)	0	0	0	0	0
188	JPN	Kokoro Iwamoto	164	2016/2017 season (100%)	0	164	0	0	0
188	JPN	Kokoro Iwamoto	164	2015/2016 season (100%)	0	0	0	0	0
188	JPN	Kokoro Iwamoto	164	2014/2015 season (70%)	0	0	0	0	0
188	AUT	Anita Kapferer	164	2016/2017 season (100%)	0	0	0	164	0
188	AUT	Anita Kapferer	164	2015/2016 season (100%)	0	0	0	0	0
188	AUT	Anita Kapferer	164	2014/2015 season (70%)	0	0	0	0	0
188	SLO	Ursa Krusec	164	2016/2017 season (100%)	0	0	0	0	0
188	SLO	Ursa Krusec	164	2015/2016 season (100%)	0	0	0	164	0
188	SLO	Ursa Krusec	164	2014/2015 season (70%)	0	0	0	0	0
188	AUT	Alexandra Philippova	164	2016/2017 season (100%)	0	0	0	0	0
188	AUT	Alexandra Philippova	164	2015/2016 season (100%)	0	0	0	164	0
188	AUT	Alexandra Philippova	164	2014/2015 season (70%)	0	0	0	0	0
188	HUN	Eszter Szombathelyi	164	2016/2017 season (100%)	0	0	0	0	0
188	HUN	Eszter Szombathelyi	164	2015/2016 season (100%)	0	0	0	164	0
188	HUN	Eszter Szombathelyi	164	2014/2015 season (70%)	0	0	0	0	0
188	BUL	Hristina Vassileva	164	2016/2017 season (100%)	0	0	0	0	0
188	BUL	Hristina Vassileva	164	2015/2016 season (100%)	0	0	0	164	0
188	BUL	Hristina Vassileva	164	2014/2015 season (70%)	0	0	0	0	0
198	ISR	Katarina Kulgeyko	160	2016/2017 season (100%)	0	0	0	0	0
198	ISR	Katarina Kulgeyko	160	2015/2016 season (100%)	0	0	0	160	0
198	ISR	Katarina Kulgeyko	160	2014/2015 season (70%)	0	0	0	0	0
199	FRA	Alizee Crozet	158	2016/2017 season (100%)	0	97	0	0	0
199	FRA	Alizee Crozet	158	2015/2016 season (100%)	61	0	0	0	0
199	FRA	Alizee Crozet	158	2014/2015 season (70%)	0	0	0	0	0
200	USA	Starr Andrews	157	2016/2017 season (100%)	157	0	0	0	0
200	USA	Starr Andrews	157	2015/2016 season (100%)	0	0	0	0	0
200	USA	Starr Andrews	157	2014/2015 season (70%)	0	0	0	0	0
201	UKR	Anastasia Kononenko	153	2016/2017 season (100%)	0	0	0	0	0
201	UKR	Anastasia Kononenko	153	2015/2016 season (100%)	0	0	0	0	0
201	UKR	Anastasia Kononenko	153	2014/2015 season (70%)	0	0	0	153	0
202	CAN	Kim Deguise Leveillee	152	2016/2017 season (100%)	0	0	0	0	0
202	CAN	Kim Deguise Leveillee	152	2015/2016 season (100%)	0	0	0	0	0
202	CAN	Kim Deguise Leveillee	152	2014/2015 season (70%)	0	84	68	0	0
203	RUS	Maria Stavitskaia	149	2016/2017 season (100%)	0	0	0	0	0
203	RUS	Maria Stavitskaia	149	2015/2016 season (100%)	0	0	0	0	0
203	RUS	Maria Stavitskaia	149	2014/2015 season (70%)	0	149	0	0	0
204	USA	Ashley Lin	148	2016/2017 season (100%)	0	148	0	0	0
204	USA	Ashley Lin	148	2015/2016 season (100%)	0	0	0	0	0
204	USA	Ashley Lin	148	2014/2015 season (70%)	0	0	0	0	0
204	USA	Alexia Paganini	148	2016/2017 season (100%)	0	148	0	0	0
204	USA	Alexia Paganini	148	2015/2016 season (100%)	0	0	0	0	0
204	USA	Alexia Paganini	148	2014/2015 season (70%)	0	0	0	0	0
206	ISR	Aimee Buchanan	144	2016/2017 season (100%)	0	0	0	144	0
206	ISR	Aimee Buchanan	144	2015/2016 season (100%)	0	0	0	0	0
206	ISR	Aimee Buchanan	144	2014/2015 season (70%)	0	0	0	0	0
206	USA	Franchesca Chiera	144	2016/2017 season (100%)	0	0	0	144	0
206	USA	Franchesca Chiera	144	2015/2016 season (100%)	0	0	0	0	0
206	USA	Franchesca Chiera	144	2014/2015 season (70%)	0	0	0	0	0
208	AUT	Sophie Almassy	142	2016/2017 season (100%)	0	0	0	0	0
208	AUT	Sophie Almassy	142	2015/2016 season (100%)	0	0	0	0	0
208	AUT	Sophie Almassy	142	2014/2015 season (70%)	0	0	0	142	0
209	USA	Barbie Long	139	2016/2017 season (100%)	0	0	0	0	0
209	USA	Barbie Long	139	2015/2016 season (100%)	0	0	0	0	0
209	USA	Barbie Long	139	2014/2015 season (70%)	0	0	0	139	0
210	PHI	Melissa Bulanhagui	134	2016/2017 season (100%)	0	0	0	0	0
210	PHI	Melissa Bulanhagui	134	2015/2016 season (100%)	0	0	0	0	0
210	PHI	Melissa Bulanhagui	134	2014/2015 season (70%)	134	0	0	0	0
211	GER	Annika Hocke	133	2016/2017 season (100%)	0	133	0	0	0
211	GER	Annika Hocke	133	2015/2016 season (100%)	0	0	0	0	0
211	GER	Annika Hocke	133	2014/2015 season (70%)	0	0	0	0	0
211	USA	Gabrielle Noullet	133	2016/2017 season (100%)	0	133	0	0	0
211	USA	Gabrielle Noullet	133	2015/2016 season (100%)	0	0	0	0	0
211	USA	Gabrielle Noullet	133	2014/2015 season (70%)	0	0	0	0	0
211	KOR	Se Bin Park	133	2016/2017 season (100%)	0	0	0	0	0
211	KOR	Se Bin Park	133	2015/2016 season (100%)	0	133	0	0	0
211	KOR	Se Bin Park	133	2014/2015 season (70%)	0	0	0	0	0
214	SLO	Nika Ceric	127	2016/2017 season (100%)	0	0	0	0	0
214	SLO	Nika Ceric	127	2015/2016 season (100%)	0	0	0	0	0
214	SLO	Nika Ceric	127	2014/2015 season (70%)	0	0	0	127	0
215	CHN	Lu Zheng	126	2016/2017 season (100%)	0	0	0	0	0
215	CHN	Lu Zheng	126	2015/2016 season (100%)	126	0	0	0	0
215	CHN	Lu Zheng	126	2014/2015 season (70%)	0	0	0	0	0
216	USA	Akari Nakahara	120	2016/2017 season (100%)	0	0	0	0	0
216	USA	Akari Nakahara	120	2015/2016 season (100%)	0	120	0	0	0
216	USA	Akari Nakahara	120	2014/2015 season (70%)	0	0	0	0	0
217	SUI	Tanja Odermatt	115	2016/2017 season (100%)	0	0	0	0	0
217	SUI	Tanja Odermatt	115	2015/2016 season (100%)	0	0	0	0	0
217	SUI	Tanja Odermatt	115	2014/2015 season (70%)	0	0	0	115	0
217	BUL	Daniela Stoeva	115	2016/2017 season (100%)	0	0	0	0	0
217	BUL	Daniela Stoeva	115	2015/2016 season (100%)	0	0	0	0	0
217	BUL	Daniela Stoeva	115	2014/2015 season (70%)	0	0	0	115	0
217	SLO	Pina Umek	115	2016/2017 season (100%)	0	0	0	0	0
217	SLO	Pina Umek	115	2015/2016 season (100%)	0	0	0	0	0
217	SLO	Pina Umek	115	2014/2015 season (70%)	0	0	0	115	0
220	KOR	Kyueun Kim	112	2016/2017 season (100%)	0	0	0	0	0
220	KOR	Kyueun Kim	112	2015/2016 season (100%)	0	0	0	0	0
220	KOR	Kyueun Kim	112	2014/2015 season (70%)	0	0	0	112	0
220	USA	Ashley Shin	112	2016/2017 season (100%)	0	0	0	0	0
220	USA	Ashley Shin	112	2015/2016 season (100%)	0	0	0	0	0
220	USA	Ashley Shin	112	2014/2015 season (70%)	0	0	0	112	0
222	UKR	Kim Cheremsky	108	2016/2017 season (100%)	0	0	0	0	0
222	UKR	Kim Cheremsky	108	2015/2016 season (100%)	0	108	0	0	0
222	UKR	Kim Cheremsky	108	2014/2015 season (70%)	0	0	0	0	0
222	CAN	Kim Decelles	108	2016/2017 season (100%)	0	0	0	0	0
222	CAN	Kim Decelles	108	2015/2016 season (100%)	0	108	0	0	0
222	CAN	Kim Decelles	108	2014/2015 season (70%)	0	0	0	0	0
222	BUL	Alexandra Feigin	108	2016/2017 season (100%)	0	108	0	0	0
222	BUL	Alexandra Feigin	108	2015/2016 season (100%)	0	0	0	0	0
222	BUL	Alexandra Feigin	108	2014/2015 season (70%)	0	0	0	0	0
222	CAN	Olivia Gran	108	2016/2017 season (100%)	0	108	0	0	0
222	CAN	Olivia Gran	108	2015/2016 season (100%)	0	0	0	0	0
222	CAN	Olivia Gran	108	2014/2015 season (70%)	0	0	0	0	0
226	JPN	Hina Takeno	104	2016/2017 season (100%)	0	0	0	0	0
226	JPN	Hina Takeno	104	2015/2016 season (100%)	0	0	0	0	0
226	JPN	Hina Takeno	104	2014/2015 season (70%)	0	104	0	0	0
226	JPN	Yuhana Yokoi	104	2016/2017 season (100%)	0	0	0	0	0
226	JPN	Yuhana Yokoi	104	2015/2016 season (100%)	0	0	0	0	0
226	JPN	Yuhana Yokoi	104	2014/2015 season (70%)	0	104	0	0	0
228	AUS	Katie Pasfield	102	2016/2017 season (100%)	0	0	0	0	0
228	AUS	Katie Pasfield	102	2015/2016 season (100%)	102	0	0	0	0
228	AUS	Katie Pasfield	102	2014/2015 season (70%)	0	0	0	0	0
229	CAN	Emily Bausback	97	2016/2017 season (100%)	0	97	0	0	0
229	CAN	Emily Bausback	97	2015/2016 season (100%)	0	0	0	0	0
229	CAN	Emily Bausback	97	2014/2015 season (70%)	0	0	0	0	0
229	KOR	Hee Soo Cho	97	2016/2017 season (100%)	0	0	0	0	0
229	KOR	Hee Soo Cho	97	2015/2016 season (100%)	0	97	0	0	0
229	KOR	Hee Soo Cho	97	2014/2015 season (70%)	0	0	0	0	0
229	CAN	Alicia Pineault	97	2016/2017 season (100%)	0	97	0	0	0
229	CAN	Alicia Pineault	97	2015/2016 season (100%)	0	0	0	0	0
229	CAN	Alicia Pineault	97	2014/2015 season (70%)	0	0	0	0	0
229	AUT	Sophia Schaller	97	2016/2017 season (100%)	0	97	0	0	0
229	AUT	Sophia Schaller	97	2015/2016 season (100%)	0	0	0	0	0
229	AUT	Sophia Schaller	97	2014/2015 season (70%)	0	0	0	0	0
233	NOR	Juni Marie Benjaminsen	94	2016/2017 season (100%)	0	0	0	0	0
233	NOR	Juni Marie Benjaminsen	94	2015/2016 season (100%)	55	0	0	0	0
233	NOR	Juni Marie Benjaminsen	94	2014/2015 season (70%)	39	0	0	0	0
234	FRA	Nadjma Mahamoud	93	2016/2017 season (100%)	0	0	0	0	0
234	FRA	Nadjma Mahamoud	93	2015/2016 season (100%)	0	0	0	0	0
234	FRA	Nadjma Mahamoud	93	2014/2015 season (70%)	0	93	0	0	0
234	JPN	Emiri Nagata	93	2016/2017 season (100%)	0	0	0	0	0
234	JPN	Emiri Nagata	93	2015/2016 season (100%)	0	0	0	0	0
234	JPN	Emiri Nagata	93	2014/2015 season (70%)	0	93	0	0	0
236	THA	Thita Lamsam	92	2016/2017 season (100%)	0	0	0	0	0
236	THA	Thita Lamsam	92	2015/2016 season (100%)	92	0	0	0	0
236	THA	Thita Lamsam	92	2014/2015 season (70%)	0	0	0	0	0
237	MEX	Reyna Hamui	88	2016/2017 season (100%)	0	0	0	0	0
237	MEX	Reyna Hamui	88	2015/2016 season (100%)	0	0	0	0	0
237	MEX	Reyna Hamui	88	2014/2015 season (70%)	88	0	0	0	0
238	KOR	Hwi Choi	84	2016/2017 season (100%)	0	0	0	0	0
238	KOR	Hwi Choi	84	2015/2016 season (100%)	0	0	0	0	0
238	KOR	Hwi Choi	84	2014/2015 season (70%)	0	84	0	0	0
239	NED	Kyarha Van Tiel	83	2016/2017 season (100%)	0	0	0	0	0
239	NED	Kyarha Van Tiel	83	2015/2016 season (100%)	83	0	0	0	0
239	NED	Kyarha Van Tiel	83	2014/2015 season (70%)	0	0	0	0	0
240	ISR	Netta Schreiber	68	2016/2017 season (100%)	0	0	0	0	0
240	ISR	Netta Schreiber	68	2015/2016 season (100%)	0	0	0	0	0
240	ISR	Netta Schreiber	68	2014/2015 season (70%)	0	68	0	0	0
241	LTU	Deimante Kizalaite	58	2016/2017 season (100%)	0	0	0	0	0
241	LTU	Deimante Kizalaite	58	2015/2016 season (100%)	0	0	0	0	0
241	LTU	Deimante Kizalaite	58	2014/2015 season (70%)	58	0	0	0	0
242	TUR	Guzide Irmak Bayir	55	2016/2017 season (100%)	55	0	0	0	0
242	TUR	Guzide Irmak Bayir	55	2015/2016 season (100%)	0	0	0	0	0
242	TUR	Guzide Irmak Bayir	55	2014/2015 season (70%)	0	0	0	0	0
243	AUS	Holly Harris	49	2016/2017 season (100%)	49	0	0	0	0
243	AUS	Holly Harris	49	2015/2016 season (100%)	0	0	0	0	0
243	AUS	Holly Harris	49	2014/2015 season (70%)	0	0	0	0	0
244	FRA	Lea Serna	48	2016/2017 season (100%)	0	0	0	0	0
244	FRA	Lea Serna	48	2015/2016 season (100%)	0	0	0	0	0
244	FRA	Lea Serna	48	2014/2015 season (70%)	48	0	0	0	0

==== Pairs (101 couples) ====
As of 30 March 2017

Rank	Nation	Couple	Points	Season	ISU Championships or Olympics	(Junior) Grand Prix and Final		Selected International Competition	
Rank	Nation	Couple	Points	Season	Best	Best	2nd Best	Best	2nd Best
1	CAN	Meagan Duhamel / Eric Radford	4878	2016/2017 season (100%)	756	648	400	300	0
1	CAN	Meagan Duhamel / Eric Radford	4878	2015/2016 season (100%)	1200	720	400	0	0
1	CAN	Meagan Duhamel / Eric Radford	4878	2014/2015 season (70%)	840	560	280	210	0
2	RUS	Evgenia Tarasova / Vladimir Morozov	4563	2016/2017 season (100%)	972	800	360	300	0
2	RUS	Evgenia Tarasova / Vladimir Morozov	4563	2015/2016 season (100%)	787	360	213	300	243
2	RUS	Evgenia Tarasova / Vladimir Morozov	4563	2014/2015 season (70%)	496	252	227	189	0
3	RUS	Ksenia Stolbova / Fedor Klimov	3946	2016/2017 season (100%)	787	0	0	0	0
3	RUS	Ksenia Stolbova / Fedor Klimov	3946	2015/2016 season (100%)	875	800	400	300	0
3	RUS	Ksenia Stolbova / Fedor Klimov	3946	2014/2015 season (70%)	529	504	280	0	0
4	GER	Aliona Savchenko / Bruno Massot	3752	2016/2017 season (100%)	1080	400	400	300	0
4	GER	Aliona Savchenko / Bruno Massot	3752	2015/2016 season (100%)	972	0	0	300	300
4	GER	Aliona Savchenko / Bruno Massot	3752	2014/2015 season (70%)	0	0	0	0	0
5	CHN	Wenjing Sui / Cong Han	3746	2016/2017 season (100%)	1200	0	0	0	0
5	CHN	Wenjing Sui / Cong Han	3746	2015/2016 season (100%)	1080	400	360	0	0
5	CHN	Wenjing Sui / Cong Han	3746	2014/2015 season (70%)	756	454	252	0	0
6	FRA	Vanessa James / Morgan Ciprès	3395	2016/2017 season (100%)	680	324	292	270	0
6	FRA	Vanessa James / Morgan Ciprès	3395	2015/2016 season (100%)	612	360	236	243	225
6	FRA	Vanessa James / Morgan Ciprès	3395	2014/2015 season (70%)	386	183	183	153	0
7	USA	Alexa Scimeca Knierim / Chris Knierim	3294	2016/2017 season (100%)	496	0	0	0	0
7	USA	Alexa Scimeca Knierim / Chris Knierim	3294	2015/2016 season (100%)	756	360	324	300	270
7	USA	Alexa Scimeca Knierim / Chris Knierim	3294	2014/2015 season (70%)	447	204	204	210	170
8	CAN	Julianne Séguin / Charlie Bilodeau	3150	2016/2017 season (100%)	418	525	400	300	0
8	CAN	Julianne Séguin / Charlie Bilodeau	3150	2015/2016 season (100%)	0	583	324	198	0
8	CAN	Julianne Séguin / Charlie Bilodeau	3150	2014/2015 season (70%)	402	245	175	0	0
9	RUS	Yuko Kavaguti / Alexander Smirnov	3026	2016/2017 season (100%)	0	262	236	270	0
9	RUS	Yuko Kavaguti / Alexander Smirnov	3026	2015/2016 season (100%)	0	648	400	300	0
9	RUS	Yuko Kavaguti / Alexander Smirnov	3026	2014/2015 season (70%)	588	330	280	210	0
10	CAN	Liubov Ilyushechkina / Dylan Moscovitch	2959	2016/2017 season (100%)	709	324	324	270	0
10	CAN	Liubov Ilyushechkina / Dylan Moscovitch	2959	2015/2016 season (100%)	638	262	213	219	0
10	CAN	Liubov Ilyushechkina / Dylan Moscovitch	2959	2014/2015 season (70%)	347	0	0	0	0
11	ITA	Nicole Della Monica / Matteo Guarise	2954	2016/2017 season (100%)	402	262	236	300	300
11	ITA	Nicole Della Monica / Matteo Guarise	2954	2015/2016 season (100%)	496	262	0	270	243
11	ITA	Nicole Della Monica / Matteo Guarise	2954	2014/2015 season (70%)	347	183	165	175	175
12	RUS	Kristina Astakhova / Alexei Rogonov	2927	2016/2017 season (100%)	0	324	262	270	270
12	RUS	Kristina Astakhova / Alexei Rogonov	2927	2015/2016 season (100%)	446	262	213	270	270
12	RUS	Kristina Astakhova / Alexei Rogonov	2927	2014/2015 season (70%)	326	227	0	210	0
13	USA	Tarah Kayne / Danny O'Shea	2860	2016/2017 season (100%)	0	292	236	198	0
13	USA	Tarah Kayne / Danny O'Shea	2860	2015/2016 season (100%)	612	292	236	300	243
13	USA	Tarah Kayne / Danny O'Shea	2860	2014/2015 season (70%)	281	0	0	170	0
14	ITA	Valentina Marchei / Ondrej Hotárek	2857	2016/2017 season (100%)	517	292	191	300	270
14	ITA	Valentina Marchei / Ondrej Hotárek	2857	2015/2016 season (100%)	551	236	0	250	250
14	ITA	Valentina Marchei / Ondrej Hotárek	2857	2014/2015 season (70%)	428	0	0	189	0
15	USA	Haven Denney / Brandon Frazier	2659	2016/2017 season (100%)	402	360	292	219	219
15	USA	Haven Denney / Brandon Frazier	2659	2015/2016 season (100%)	0	0	0	0	0
15	USA	Haven Denney / Brandon Frazier	2659	2014/2015 season (70%)	312	252	204	210	189
16	AUT	Miriam Ziegler / Severin Kiefer	2521	2016/2017 season (100%)	362	236	236	250	225
16	AUT	Miriam Ziegler / Severin Kiefer	2521	2015/2016 season (100%)	362	236	191	225	198
16	AUT	Miriam Ziegler / Severin Kiefer	2521	2014/2015 season (70%)	281	134	134	189	115
17	RUS	Natalia Zabiiako / Alexander Enbert	2488	2016/2017 season (100%)	551	583	360	243	0
17	RUS	Natalia Zabiiako / Alexander Enbert	2488	2015/2016 season (100%)	0	262	0	270	219
17	RUS	Natalia Zabiiako / Alexander Enbert	2488	2014/2015 season (70%)	0	0	0	0	0
18	CZE	Anna Dušková / Martin Bidař	2301	2016/2017 season (100%)	446	315	250	250	0
18	CZE	Anna Dušková / Martin Bidař	2301	2015/2016 season (100%)	500	315	225	0	0
18	CZE	Anna Dušková / Martin Bidař	2301	2014/2015 season (70%)	167	84	68	0	0
19	USA	Marissa Castelli / Mervin Tran	2210	2016/2017 season (100%)	0	262	213	243	0
19	USA	Marissa Castelli / Mervin Tran	2210	2015/2016 season (100%)	496	292	236	270	198
19	USA	Marissa Castelli / Mervin Tran	2210	2014/2015 season (70%)	0	0	0	0	0
20	GER	Mari Vartmann / Ruben Blommaert	2139	2016/2017 season (100%)	0	262	213	243	243
20	GER	Mari Vartmann / Ruben Blommaert	2139	2015/2016 season (100%)	402	236	0	270	270
20	GER	Mari Vartmann / Ruben Blommaert	2139	2014/2015 season (70%)	0	0	0	0	0
21	CAN	Kirsten Moore-Towers / Michael Marinaro	2114	2016/2017 season (100%)	446	0	0	0	0
21	CAN	Kirsten Moore-Towers / Michael Marinaro	2114	2015/2016 season (100%)	574	324	213	243	0
21	CAN	Kirsten Moore-Towers / Michael Marinaro	2114	2014/2015 season (70%)	253	165	149	0	0
22	CHN	Xiaoyu Yu / Hao Zhang	1995	2016/2017 season (100%)	875	720	400	0	0
22	CHN	Xiaoyu Yu / Hao Zhang	1995	2015/2016 season (100%)	0	0	0	0	0
22	CHN	Xiaoyu Yu / Hao Zhang	1995	2014/2015 season (70%)	0	0	0	0	0
23	JPN	Sumire Suto / Francis Boudreau-Audet	1619	2016/2017 season (100%)	325	213	0	250	219
23	JPN	Sumire Suto / Francis Boudreau-Audet	1619	2015/2016 season (100%)	362	0	0	250	0
23	JPN	Sumire Suto / Francis Boudreau-Audet	1619	2014/2015 season (70%)	0	0	0	0	0
24	USA	Chelsea Liu / Brian Johnson	1540	2016/2017 season (100%)	266	203	164	270	0
24	USA	Chelsea Liu / Brian Johnson	1540	2015/2016 season (100%)	328	164	120	0	0
24	USA	Chelsea Liu / Brian Johnson	1540	2014/2015 season (70%)	186	145	142	0	0
24	RUS	Vera Bazarova / Andrei Deputat	1540	2016/2017 season (100%)	0	0	0	0	0
24	RUS	Vera Bazarova / Andrei Deputat	1540	2015/2016 season (100%)	0	292	262	250	0
24	RUS	Vera Bazarova / Andrei Deputat	1540	2014/2015 season (70%)	0	204	204	170	158
24	RUS	Tatiana Volosozhar / Maxim Trankov	1540	2016/2017 season (100%)	0	0	0	0	0
24	RUS	Tatiana Volosozhar / Maxim Trankov	1540	2015/2016 season (100%)	840	400	0	300	0
24	RUS	Tatiana Volosozhar / Maxim Trankov	1540	2014/2015 season (70%)	0	0	0	0	0
27	CHN	Xuehan Wang / Lei Wang	1445	2016/2017 season (100%)	0	324	292	0	0
27	CHN	Xuehan Wang / Lei Wang	1445	2015/2016 season (100%)	275	292	262	0	0
27	CHN	Xuehan Wang / Lei Wang	1445	2014/2015 season (70%)	0	227	227	0	0
28	LTU	Goda Butkutė / Nikita Ermolaev	1416	2016/2017 season (100%)	0	191	0	243	203
28	LTU	Goda Butkutė / Nikita Ermolaev	1416	2015/2016 season (100%)	293	0	0	243	243
28	LTU	Goda Butkutė / Nikita Ermolaev	1416	2014/2015 season (70%)	0	0	0	0	0
29	RUS	Ekaterina Borisova / Dmitry Sopot	1411	2016/2017 season (100%)	0	203	203	0	0
29	RUS	Ekaterina Borisova / Dmitry Sopot	1411	2015/2016 season (100%)	405	350	250	0	0
29	RUS	Ekaterina Borisova / Dmitry Sopot	1411	2014/2015 season (70%)	0	0	0	0	0
30	USA	Jessica Calalang / Zack Sidhu	1393	2016/2017 season (100%)	0	0	0	270	0
30	USA	Jessica Calalang / Zack Sidhu	1393	2015/2016 season (100%)	0	213	0	219	0
30	USA	Jessica Calalang / Zack Sidhu	1393	2014/2015 season (70%)	0	183	149	189	170
31	CHN	Cheng Peng / Yang Jin	1383	2016/2017 season (100%)	551	472	360	0	0
31	CHN	Cheng Peng / Yang Jin	1383	2015/2016 season (100%)	0	0	0	0	0
31	CHN	Cheng Peng / Yang Jin	1383	2014/2015 season (70%)	0	0	0	0	0
32	PRK	Tae Ok Ryom / Ju Sik Kim	1372	2016/2017 season (100%)	275	0	0	250	0
32	PRK	Tae Ok Ryom / Ju Sik Kim	1372	2015/2016 season (100%)	446	0	0	203	198
32	PRK	Tae Ok Ryom / Ju Sik Kim	1372	2014/2015 season (70%)	0	0	0	0	0
33	RUS	Amina Atakhanova / Ilia Spiridonov	1331	2016/2017 season (100%)	365	225	207	0	0
33	RUS	Amina Atakhanova / Ilia Spiridonov	1331	2015/2016 season (100%)	0	284	250	0	0
33	RUS	Amina Atakhanova / Ilia Spiridonov	1331	2014/2015 season (70%)	0	0	0	0	0
34	GER	Minerva Fabienne Hase / Nolan Seegert	1322	2016/2017 season (100%)	264	0	0	243	203
34	GER	Minerva Fabienne Hase / Nolan Seegert	1322	2015/2016 season (100%)	0	0	0	225	182
34	GER	Minerva Fabienne Hase / Nolan Seegert	1322	2014/2015 season (70%)	205	0	0	142	142
35	RUS	Alina Ustimkina / Nikita Volodin	1239	2016/2017 season (100%)	295	255	225	300	0
35	RUS	Alina Ustimkina / Nikita Volodin	1239	2015/2016 season (100%)	0	164	0	0	0
35	RUS	Alina Ustimkina / Nikita Volodin	1239	2014/2015 season (70%)	0	0	0	0	0
36	BLR	Tatiana Danilova / Mikalai Kamianchuk	1225	2016/2017 season (100%)	325	0	0	0	0
36	BLR	Tatiana Danilova / Mikalai Kamianchuk	1225	2015/2016 season (100%)	325	0	0	219	198
36	BLR	Tatiana Danilova / Mikalai Kamianchuk	1225	2014/2015 season (70%)	0	0	0	158	0
37	RUS	Anastasia Mishina / Vladislav Mirzoev	1214	2016/2017 season (100%)	0	350	250	0	0
37	RUS	Anastasia Mishina / Vladislav Mirzoev	1214	2015/2016 season (100%)	450	164	0	0	0
37	RUS	Anastasia Mishina / Vladislav Mirzoev	1214	2014/2015 season (70%)	0	0	0	0	0
38	UKR	Renata Oganesian / Mark Bardei	1135	2016/2017 season (100%)	0	148	97	0	0
38	UKR	Renata Oganesian / Mark Bardei	1135	2015/2016 season (100%)	365	250	230	0	0
38	UKR	Renata Oganesian / Mark Bardei	1135	2014/2015 season (70%)	0	142	115	0	0
39	FRA	Lola Esbrat / Andrei Novoselov	1054	2016/2017 season (100%)	237	0	0	164	0
39	FRA	Lola Esbrat / Andrei Novoselov	1054	2015/2016 season (100%)	247	0	0	203	203
39	FRA	Lola Esbrat / Andrei Novoselov	1054	2014/2015 season (70%)	0	0	0	0	0
40	AUS	Ekaterina Alexandrovskaya / Harley Windsor	980	2016/2017 season (100%)	500	250	230	0	0
40	AUS	Ekaterina Alexandrovskaya / Harley Windsor	980	2015/2016 season (100%)	0	0	0	0	0
40	AUS	Ekaterina Alexandrovskaya / Harley Windsor	980	2014/2015 season (70%)	0	0	0	0	0
41	RUS	Aleksandra Boikova / Dmitrii Kozlovskii	959	2016/2017 season (100%)	450	284	225	0	0
41	RUS	Aleksandra Boikova / Dmitrii Kozlovskii	959	2015/2016 season (100%)	0	0	0	0	0
41	RUS	Aleksandra Boikova / Dmitrii Kozlovskii	959	2014/2015 season (70%)	0	0	0	0	0
42	RUS	Alisa Efimova / Alexander Korovin	933	2016/2017 season (100%)	0	213	0	270	225
42	RUS	Alisa Efimova / Alexander Korovin	933	2015/2016 season (100%)	0	0	0	225	0
42	RUS	Alisa Efimova / Alexander Korovin	933	2014/2015 season (70%)	0	0	0	0	0
43	RUS	Lina Fedorova / Maxim Miroshkin	873	2016/2017 season (100%)	0	0	0	0	0
43	RUS	Lina Fedorova / Maxim Miroshkin	873	2015/2016 season (100%)	0	0	0	0	0
43	RUS	Lina Fedorova / Maxim Miroshkin	873	2014/2015 season (70%)	284	221	158	210	0
44	USA	Ashley Cain / Timothy Leduc	824	2016/2017 season (100%)	362	0	0	243	219
44	USA	Ashley Cain / Timothy Leduc	824	2015/2016 season (100%)	0	0	0	0	0
44	USA	Ashley Cain / Timothy Leduc	824	2014/2015 season (70%)	0	0	0	0	0
45	CAN	Brittany Jones / Joshua Reagan	815	2016/2017 season (100%)	0	213	0	300	0
45	CAN	Brittany Jones / Joshua Reagan	815	2015/2016 season (100%)	0	0	0	0	0
45	CAN	Brittany Jones / Joshua Reagan	815	2014/2015 season (70%)	0	149	0	153	0
46	FRA	Camille Mendoza / Pavel Kovalev	752	2016/2017 season (100%)	0	0	0	219	0
46	FRA	Camille Mendoza / Pavel Kovalev	752	2015/2016 season (100%)	0	0	0	203	203
46	FRA	Camille Mendoza / Pavel Kovalev	752	2014/2015 season (70%)	0	0	0	127	0
47	ITA	Rebecca Ghilardi / Filippo Ambrosini	739	2016/2017 season (100%)	293	0	0	243	203
47	ITA	Rebecca Ghilardi / Filippo Ambrosini	739	2015/2016 season (100%)	0	0	0	0	0
47	ITA	Rebecca Ghilardi / Filippo Ambrosini	739	2014/2015 season (70%)	0	0	0	0	0
48	CHN	Yumeng Gao / Zhong Xie	733	2016/2017 season (100%)	405	164	164	0	0
48	CHN	Yumeng Gao / Zhong Xie	733	2015/2016 season (100%)	0	0	0	0	0
48	CHN	Yumeng Gao / Zhong Xie	733	2014/2015 season (70%)	0	0	0	0	0
49	CAN	Justine Brasseur / Mathieu Ostiguy	726	2016/2017 season (100%)	0	148	0	0	0
49	CAN	Justine Brasseur / Mathieu Ostiguy	726	2015/2016 season (100%)	266	164	148	0	0
49	CAN	Justine Brasseur / Mathieu Ostiguy	726	2014/2015 season (70%)	0	0	0	0	0
50	SUI	Alexandra Herbrikova / Nicolas Roulet	695	2016/2017 season (100%)	0	0	0	225	0
50	SUI	Alexandra Herbrikova / Nicolas Roulet	695	2015/2016 season (100%)	173	0	0	182	0
50	SUI	Alexandra Herbrikova / Nicolas Roulet	695	2014/2015 season (70%)	0	0	0	115	0
51	CHN	Qing Pang / Jian Tong	680	2016/2017 season (100%)	0	0	0	0	0
51	CHN	Qing Pang / Jian Tong	680	2015/2016 season (100%)	0	0	0	0	0
51	CHN	Qing Pang / Jian Tong	680	2014/2015 season (70%)	680	0	0	0	0
52	USA	Lindsay Weinstein / Jacob Simon	668	2016/2017 season (100%)	0	97	0	0	0
52	USA	Lindsay Weinstein / Jacob Simon	668	2015/2016 season (100%)	215	133	108	0	0
52	USA	Lindsay Weinstein / Jacob Simon	668	2014/2015 season (70%)	0	115	93	0	0
53	SUI	Ioulia Chtchetinina / Noah Scherer	617	2016/2017 season (100%)	0	0	0	250	0
53	SUI	Ioulia Chtchetinina / Noah Scherer	617	2015/2016 season (100%)	0	0	0	203	164
53	SUI	Ioulia Chtchetinina / Noah Scherer	617	2014/2015 season (70%)	0	0	0	0	0
54	KOR	Su Yeon Kim / Hyungtae Kim	609	2016/2017 season (100%)	264	120	0	225	0
54	KOR	Su Yeon Kim / Hyungtae Kim	609	2015/2016 season (100%)	0	0	0	0	0
54	KOR	Su Yeon Kim / Hyungtae Kim	609	2014/2015 season (70%)	0	0	0	0	0
54	CRO	Lana Petranovic / Antonio Souza-Kordeiru	609	2016/2017 season (100%)	192	0	0	219	198
54	CRO	Lana Petranovic / Antonio Souza-Kordeiru	609	2015/2016 season (100%)	0	0	0	0	0
54	CRO	Lana Petranovic / Antonio Souza-Kordeiru	609	2014/2015 season (70%)	0	0	0	0	0
56	CAN	Bryn Hoffman / Bryce Chudak	603	2016/2017 season (100%)	0	0	0	0	0
56	CAN	Bryn Hoffman / Bryce Chudak	603	2015/2016 season (100%)	239	182	182	0	0
56	CAN	Bryn Hoffman / Bryce Chudak	603	2014/2015 season (70%)	0	0	0	0	0
57	USA	Jessica Pfund / Joshua Santillan	601	2016/2017 season (100%)	0	191	0	219	0
57	USA	Jessica Pfund / Joshua Santillan	601	2015/2016 season (100%)	0	191	0	0	0
57	USA	Jessica Pfund / Joshua Santillan	601	2014/2015 season (70%)	0	0	0	0	0
58	GBR	Caitlin Yankowskas / Hamish Gaman	564	2016/2017 season (100%)	0	0	0	0	0
58	GBR	Caitlin Yankowskas / Hamish Gaman	564	2015/2016 season (100%)	0	0	0	0	0
58	GBR	Caitlin Yankowskas / Hamish Gaman	564	2014/2015 season (70%)	253	0	0	158	153
59	USA	Joy Weinberg / Maximiliano Fernandez	552	2016/2017 season (100%)	0	0	0	0	0
59	USA	Joy Weinberg / Maximiliano Fernandez	552	2015/2016 season (100%)	194	225	133	0	0
59	USA	Joy Weinberg / Maximiliano Fernandez	552	2014/2015 season (70%)	0	0	0	0	0
60	CAN	Lori-Ann Matte / Thierry Ferland	545	2016/2017 season (100%)	215	182	148	0	0
60	CAN	Lori-Ann Matte / Thierry Ferland	545	2015/2016 season (100%)	0	0	0	0	0
60	CAN	Lori-Ann Matte / Thierry Ferland	545	2014/2015 season (70%)	0	0	0	0	0
61	AUS	Paris Stephens / Matthew Dodds	515	2016/2017 season (100%)	0	0	0	198	164
61	AUS	Paris Stephens / Matthew Dodds	515	2015/2016 season (100%)	0	0	0	0	0
61	AUS	Paris Stephens / Matthew Dodds	515	2014/2015 season (70%)	0	0	0	153	0
62	CAN	Evelyn Walsh / Trennt Michaud	492	2016/2017 season (100%)	328	164	0	0	0
62	CAN	Evelyn Walsh / Trennt Michaud	492	2015/2016 season (100%)	0	0	0	0	0
62	CAN	Evelyn Walsh / Trennt Michaud	492	2014/2015 season (70%)	0	0	0	0	0
63	CAN	Camille Ruest / Andrew Wolfe	455	2016/2017 season (100%)	0	236	0	219	0
63	CAN	Camille Ruest / Andrew Wolfe	455	2015/2016 season (100%)	0	0	0	0	0
63	CAN	Camille Ruest / Andrew Wolfe	455	2014/2015 season (70%)	0	0	0	0	0
64	JPN	Miu Suzaki / Ryuichi Kihara	440	2016/2017 season (100%)	237	0	0	203	0
64	JPN	Miu Suzaki / Ryuichi Kihara	440	2015/2016 season (100%)	0	0	0	0	0
64	JPN	Miu Suzaki / Ryuichi Kihara	440	2014/2015 season (70%)	0	0	0	0	0
65	KOR	Kyueun Kim / Alex Kang Chan Kam	390	2016/2017 season (100%)	192	0	0	198	0
65	KOR	Kyueun Kim / Alex Kang Chan Kam	390	2015/2016 season (100%)	0	0	0	0	0
65	KOR	Kyueun Kim / Alex Kang Chan Kam	390	2014/2015 season (70%)	0	0	0	0	0
66	GBR	Zoe Jones / Christopher Boyadji	378	2016/2017 season (100%)	214	0	0	164	0
66	GBR	Zoe Jones / Christopher Boyadji	378	2015/2016 season (100%)	0	0	0	0	0
66	GBR	Zoe Jones / Christopher Boyadji	378	2014/2015 season (70%)	0	0	0	0	0
67	RUS	Maria Vigalova / Egor Zakroev	374	2016/2017 season (100%)	0	0	0	0	0
67	RUS	Maria Vigalova / Egor Zakroev	374	2015/2016 season (100%)	0	0	0	0	0
67	RUS	Maria Vigalova / Egor Zakroev	374	2014/2015 season (70%)	0	199	175	0	0
68	ISR	Arina Cherniavskaia / Evgeni Krasnopolski	371	2016/2017 season (100%)	173	0	0	198	0
68	ISR	Arina Cherniavskaia / Evgeni Krasnopolski	371	2015/2016 season (100%)	0	0	0	0	0
68	ISR	Arina Cherniavskaia / Evgeni Krasnopolski	371	2014/2015 season (70%)	0	0	0	0	0
69	RUS	Elena Ivanova / Tagir Khakimov	351	2016/2017 season (100%)	0	0	0	0	0
69	RUS	Elena Ivanova / Tagir Khakimov	351	2015/2016 season (100%)	0	203	148	0	0
69	RUS	Elena Ivanova / Tagir Khakimov	351	2014/2015 season (70%)	0	0	0	0	0
70	JPN	Marin Ono / Wesley Killing	346	2016/2017 season (100%)	0	0	0	182	0
70	JPN	Marin Ono / Wesley Killing	346	2015/2016 season (100%)	0	0	0	164	0
70	JPN	Marin Ono / Wesley Killing	346	2014/2015 season (70%)	0	0	0	0	0
71	USA	Nica Digerness / Danny Neudecker	342	2016/2017 season (100%)	194	148	0	0	0
71	USA	Nica Digerness / Danny Neudecker	342	2015/2016 season (100%)	0	0	0	0	0
71	USA	Nica Digerness / Danny Neudecker	342	2014/2015 season (70%)	0	0	0	0	0
72	CAN	Mary Orr / Phelan Simpson	333	2016/2017 season (100%)	0	0	0	0	0
72	CAN	Mary Orr / Phelan Simpson	333	2015/2016 season (100%)	0	0	0	0	0
72	CAN	Mary Orr / Phelan Simpson	333	2014/2015 season (70%)	136	104	93	0	0
73	ITA	Irma Caldara / Edoardo Caputo	308	2016/2017 season (100%)	114	0	0	0	0
73	ITA	Irma Caldara / Edoardo Caputo	308	2015/2016 season (100%)	0	97	97	0	0
73	ITA	Irma Caldara / Edoardo Caputo	308	2014/2015 season (70%)	0	0	0	0	0
74	ESP	Marcelina Lech / Aritz Maestu	307	2016/2017 season (100%)	0	0	0	0	0
74	ESP	Marcelina Lech / Aritz Maestu	307	2015/2016 season (100%)	192	0	0	0	0
74	ESP	Marcelina Lech / Aritz Maestu	307	2014/2015 season (70%)	0	0	0	115	0
75	ISR	Hailey Esther Kops / Artem Tsoglin	282	2016/2017 season (100%)	174	108	0	0	0
75	ISR	Hailey Esther Kops / Artem Tsoglin	282	2015/2016 season (100%)	0	0	0	0	0
75	ISR	Hailey Esther Kops / Artem Tsoglin	282	2014/2015 season (70%)	0	0	0	0	0
76	GBR	Chloe Curtin / Steven Adcock	277	2016/2017 season (100%)	0	0	0	0	0
76	GBR	Chloe Curtin / Steven Adcock	277	2015/2016 season (100%)	157	120	0	0	0
76	GBR	Chloe Curtin / Steven Adcock	277	2014/2015 season (70%)	0	0	0	0	0
77	USA	Sarah Rose / Joseph Goodpaster	266	2016/2017 season (100%)	0	133	0	0	0
77	USA	Sarah Rose / Joseph Goodpaster	266	2015/2016 season (100%)	0	133	0	0	0
77	USA	Sarah Rose / Joseph Goodpaster	266	2014/2015 season (70%)	0	0	0	0	0
78	CHN	Yue Han / Yongchao Yang	253	2016/2017 season (100%)	0	133	120	0	0
78	CHN	Yue Han / Yongchao Yang	253	2015/2016 season (100%)	0	0	0	0	0
78	CHN	Yue Han / Yongchao Yang	253	2014/2015 season (70%)	0	0	0	0	0
79	USA	Alexandria Shaugnessy / James Morgan	243	2016/2017 season (100%)	0	0	0	243	0
79	USA	Alexandria Shaugnessy / James Morgan	243	2015/2016 season (100%)	0	0	0	0	0
79	USA	Alexandria Shaugnessy / James Morgan	243	2014/2015 season (70%)	0	0	0	0	0
80	USA	Caitlin Fields / Ernie Utah Stevens	230	2016/2017 season (100%)	0	0	0	0	0
80	USA	Caitlin Fields / Ernie Utah Stevens	230	2015/2016 season (100%)	0	0	0	0	0
80	USA	Caitlin Fields / Ernie Utah Stevens	230	2014/2015 season (70%)	230	0	0	0	0
81	JPN	Ami Koga / Spencer Akira Howe	228	2016/2017 season (100%)	0	120	108	0	0
81	JPN	Ami Koga / Spencer Akira Howe	228	2015/2016 season (100%)	0	0	0	0	0
81	JPN	Ami Koga / Spencer Akira Howe	228	2014/2015 season (70%)	0	0	0	0	0
82	PRK	So Hyang Pak / Nam I Song	225	2016/2017 season (100%)	0	0	0	225	0
82	PRK	So Hyang Pak / Nam I Song	225	2015/2016 season (100%)	0	0	0	0	0
82	PRK	So Hyang Pak / Nam I Song	225	2014/2015 season (70%)	0	0	0	0	0
83	RUS	Maria Chuzhanova / Denis Mintsev	219	2016/2017 season (100%)	0	0	0	0	0
83	RUS	Maria Chuzhanova / Denis Mintsev	219	2015/2016 season (100%)	0	0	0	0	0
83	RUS	Maria Chuzhanova / Denis Mintsev	219	2014/2015 season (70%)	0	115	104	0	0
84	KOR	Minji Ji / Themistocles Leftheris	214	2016/2017 season (100%)	214	0	0	0	0
84	KOR	Minji Ji / Themistocles Leftheris	214	2015/2016 season (100%)	0	0	0	0	0
84	KOR	Minji Ji / Themistocles Leftheris	214	2014/2015 season (70%)	0	0	0	0	0
85	HUN	Daria Beklemisheva / Márk Magyar	203	2016/2017 season (100%)	0	0	0	203	0
85	HUN	Daria Beklemisheva / Márk Magyar	203	2015/2016 season (100%)	0	0	0	0	0
85	HUN	Daria Beklemisheva / Márk Magyar	203	2014/2015 season (70%)	0	0	0	0	0
86	USA	Erika Smith / Aj Reiss	198	2016/2017 season (100%)	0	0	0	198	0
86	USA	Erika Smith / Aj Reiss	198	2015/2016 season (100%)	0	0	0	0	0
86	USA	Erika Smith / Aj Reiss	198	2014/2015 season (70%)	0	0	0	0	0
87	GEO	Tatiana Kozmava / Alexei Shumski	182	2016/2017 season (100%)	0	0	0	182	0
87	GEO	Tatiana Kozmava / Alexei Shumski	182	2015/2016 season (100%)	0	0	0	0	0
87	GEO	Tatiana Kozmava / Alexei Shumski	182	2014/2015 season (70%)	0	0	0	0	0
87	RUS	Bogdana Lukashevich / Alexander Stepanov	182	2016/2017 season (100%)	0	0	0	182	0
87	RUS	Bogdana Lukashevich / Alexander Stepanov	182	2015/2016 season (100%)	0	0	0	0	0
87	RUS	Bogdana Lukashevich / Alexander Stepanov	182	2014/2015 season (70%)	0	0	0	0	0
87	FIN	Emilia Simonen / Matthew Penasse	182	2016/2017 season (100%)	0	0	0	182	0
87	FIN	Emilia Simonen / Matthew Penasse	182	2015/2016 season (100%)	0	0	0	0	0
87	FIN	Emilia Simonen / Matthew Penasse	182	2014/2015 season (70%)	0	0	0	0	0
87	RUS	Anastasia Poluianova / Maksim Selkin	182	2016/2017 season (100%)	0	182	0	0	0
87	RUS	Anastasia Poluianova / Maksim Selkin	182	2015/2016 season (100%)	0	0	0	0	0
87	RUS	Anastasia Poluianova / Maksim Selkin	182	2014/2015 season (70%)	0	0	0	0	0
91	TUR	Cagla Demirsal / Berk Akalin	164	2016/2017 season (100%)	0	0	0	164	0
91	TUR	Cagla Demirsal / Berk Akalin	164	2015/2016 season (100%)	0	0	0	0	0
91	TUR	Cagla Demirsal / Berk Akalin	164	2014/2015 season (70%)	0	0	0	0	0
92	GER	Talisa Thomalla / Robert Kunkel	157	2016/2017 season (100%)	157	0	0	0	0
92	GER	Talisa Thomalla / Robert Kunkel	157	2015/2016 season (100%)	0	0	0	0	0
92	GER	Talisa Thomalla / Robert Kunkel	157	2014/2015 season (70%)	0	0	0	0	0
93	JPN	Riku Miura / Shoya Ichihashi	141	2016/2017 season (100%)	141	0	0	0	0
93	JPN	Riku Miura / Shoya Ichihashi	141	2015/2016 season (100%)	0	0	0	0	0
93	JPN	Riku Miura / Shoya Ichihashi	141	2014/2015 season (70%)	0	0	0	0	0
94	USA	Gabriella Marvaldi / Daniel Villeneuve	133	2016/2017 season (100%)	0	133	0	0	0
94	USA	Gabriella Marvaldi / Daniel Villeneuve	133	2015/2016 season (100%)	0	0	0	0	0
94	USA	Gabriella Marvaldi / Daniel Villeneuve	133	2014/2015 season (70%)	0	0	0	0	0
94	RUS	Kseniia Akhanteva / Valerii Kolesov	133	2016/2017 season (100%)	0	133	0	0	0
94	RUS	Kseniia Akhanteva / Valerii Kolesov	133	2015/2016 season (100%)	0	0	0	0	0
94	RUS	Kseniia Akhanteva / Valerii Kolesov	133	2014/2015 season (70%)	0	0	0	0	0
96	FRA	Cleo Hamon / Denys Strekalin	127	2016/2017 season (100%)	127	0	0	0	0
96	FRA	Cleo Hamon / Denys Strekalin	127	2015/2016 season (100%)	0	0	0	0	0
96	FRA	Cleo Hamon / Denys Strekalin	127	2014/2015 season (70%)	0	0	0	0	0
96	KAZ	Ekaterina Khokhlova / Abish Baytkanov	127	2016/2017 season (100%)	0	0	0	0	0
96	KAZ	Ekaterina Khokhlova / Abish Baytkanov	127	2015/2016 season (100%)	127	0	0	0	0
96	KAZ	Ekaterina Khokhlova / Abish Baytkanov	127	2014/2015 season (70%)	0	0	0	0	0
98	ITA	Giulia Foresti / Leo Luca Sforza	108	2016/2017 season (100%)	0	108	0	0	0
98	ITA	Giulia Foresti / Leo Luca Sforza	108	2015/2016 season (100%)	0	0	0	0	0
98	ITA	Giulia Foresti / Leo Luca Sforza	108	2014/2015 season (70%)	0	0	0	0	0
98	CAN	Hannah Dawson / Christian Reekie	108	2016/2017 season (100%)	0	108	0	0	0
98	CAN	Hannah Dawson / Christian Reekie	108	2015/2016 season (100%)	0	0	0	0	0
98	CAN	Hannah Dawson / Christian Reekie	108	2014/2015 season (70%)	0	0	0	0	0
100	ESP	Alexanne Bouillon / Ton Consul	103	2016/2017 season (100%)	103	0	0	0	0
100	ESP	Alexanne Bouillon / Ton Consul	103	2015/2016 season (100%)	0	0	0	0	0
100	ESP	Alexanne Bouillon / Ton Consul	103	2014/2015 season (70%)	0	0	0	0	0
101	CAN	Jamie Knoblauch / Cody Wong	97	2016/2017 season (100%)	0	97	0	0	0
101	CAN	Jamie Knoblauch / Cody Wong	97	2015/2016 season (100%)	0	0	0	0	0
101	CAN	Jamie Knoblauch / Cody Wong	97	2014/2015 season (70%)	0	0	0	0	0

==== Ice dance (133 couples) ====
As of 1 April 2017

Rank	Nation	Couple	Points	Season	ISU Championships or Olympics	(Junior) Grand Prix and Final		Selected International Competition	
Rank	Nation	Couple	Points	Season	Best	Best	2nd Best	Best	2nd Best
1	USA	Madison Chock / Evan Bates	4853	2016/2017 season (100%)	680	472	360	270	270
1	USA	Madison Chock / Evan Bates	4853	2015/2016 season (100%)	972	720	400	300	0
1	USA	Madison Chock / Evan Bates	4853	2014/2015 season (70%)	756	504	280	189	0
2	USA	Maia Shibutani / Alex Shibutani	4754	2016/2017 season (100%)	972	648	400	0	0
2	USA	Maia Shibutani / Alex Shibutani	4754	2015/2016 season (100%)	1080	583	400	243	0
2	USA	Maia Shibutani / Alex Shibutani	4754	2014/2015 season (70%)	551	408	252	210	210
3	FRA	Gabriella Papadakis / Guillaume Cizeron	4344	2016/2017 season (100%)	1080	720	400	0	0
3	FRA	Gabriella Papadakis / Guillaume Cizeron	4344	2015/2016 season (100%)	1200	0	0	0	0
3	FRA	Gabriella Papadakis / Guillaume Cizeron	4344	2014/2015 season (70%)	840	454	280	210	0
4	CAN	Kaitlyn Weaver / Andrew Poje	4292	2016/2017 season (100%)	875	360	324	0	0
4	CAN	Kaitlyn Weaver / Andrew Poje	4292	2015/2016 season (100%)	787	800	400	300	0
4	CAN	Kaitlyn Weaver / Andrew Poje	4292	2014/2015 season (70%)	680	560	280	210	0
5	USA	Madison Hubbell / Zachary Donohue	4158	2016/2017 season (100%)	612	525	360	300	270
5	USA	Madison Hubbell / Zachary Donohue	4158	2015/2016 season (100%)	709	472	400	300	0
5	USA	Madison Hubbell / Zachary Donohue	4158	2014/2015 season (70%)	326	227	227	210	0
6	ITA	Anna Cappellini / Luca Lanotte	4095	2016/2017 season (100%)	756	324	292	300	250
6	ITA	Anna Cappellini / Luca Lanotte	4095	2015/2016 season (100%)	875	648	400	250	0
6	ITA	Anna Cappellini / Luca Lanotte	4095	2014/2015 season (70%)	613	227	0	0	0
7	RUS	Ekaterina Bobrova / Dmitri Soloviev	3935	2016/2017 season (100%)	787	583	400	300	300
7	RUS	Ekaterina Bobrova / Dmitri Soloviev	3935	2015/2016 season (100%)	680	525	360	0	0
7	RUS	Ekaterina Bobrova / Dmitri Soloviev	3935	2014/2015 season (70%)	0	0	0	0	0
8	ITA	Charlene Guignard / Marco Fabbri	3329	2016/2017 season (100%)	496	292	292	300	300
8	ITA	Charlene Guignard / Marco Fabbri	3329	2015/2016 season (100%)	465	292	292	300	300
8	ITA	Charlene Guignard / Marco Fabbri	3329	2014/2015 season (70%)	347	183	165	189	189
9	CAN	Piper Gilles / Paul Poirier	3256	2016/2017 season (100%)	574	324	324	243	0
9	CAN	Piper Gilles / Paul Poirier	3256	2015/2016 season (100%)	574	360	324	300	0
9	CAN	Piper Gilles / Paul Poirier	3256	2014/2015 season (70%)	496	368	252	189	0
10	RUS	Alexandra Stepanova / Ivan Bukin	2814	2016/2017 season (100%)	551	324	262	300	0
10	RUS	Alexandra Stepanova / Ivan Bukin	2814	2015/2016 season (100%)	551	324	292	0	0
10	RUS	Alexandra Stepanova / Ivan Bukin	2814	2014/2015 season (70%)	476	227	183	210	0
11	CAN	Tessa Virtue / Scott Moir	2700	2016/2017 season (100%)	1200	800	400	300	0
11	CAN	Tessa Virtue / Scott Moir	2700	2015/2016 season (100%)	0	0	0	0	0
11	CAN	Tessa Virtue / Scott Moir	2700	2014/2015 season (70%)	0	0	0	0	0
12	DEN	Laurence Fournier Beaudry / Nikolaj Sørensen	2684	2016/2017 season (100%)	446	213	213	243	219
12	DEN	Laurence Fournier Beaudry / Nikolaj Sørensen	2684	2015/2016 season (100%)	362	262	213	270	243
12	DEN	Laurence Fournier Beaudry / Nikolaj Sørensen	2684	2014/2015 season (70%)	293	0	0	189	170
13	ISR	Isabella Tobias / Ilia Tkachenko	2546	2016/2017 season (100%)	612	262	236	270	219
13	ISR	Isabella Tobias / Ilia Tkachenko	2546	2015/2016 season (100%)	377	0	0	300	270
13	ISR	Isabella Tobias / Ilia Tkachenko	2546	2014/2015 season (70%)	0	0	0	0	0
14	GBR	Penny Coomes / Nicholas Buckland	2472	2016/2017 season (100%)	0	0	0	0	0
14	GBR	Penny Coomes / Nicholas Buckland	2472	2015/2016 season (100%)	638	292	262	270	250
14	GBR	Penny Coomes / Nicholas Buckland	2472	2014/2015 season (70%)	0	227	183	175	175
15	USA	Kaitlin Hawayek / Jean-Luc Baker	2462	2016/2017 season (100%)	0	292	236	270	270
15	USA	Kaitlin Hawayek / Jean-Luc Baker	2462	2015/2016 season (100%)	0	292	0	270	219
15	USA	Kaitlin Hawayek / Jean-Luc Baker	2462	2014/2015 season (70%)	386	227	165	153	0
16	RUS	Elena Ilinykh / Ruslan Zhiganshin	2255	2016/2017 season (100%)	0	292	262	300	0
16	RUS	Elena Ilinykh / Ruslan Zhiganshin	2255	2015/2016 season (100%)	0	324	262	300	0
16	RUS	Elena Ilinykh / Ruslan Zhiganshin	2255	2014/2015 season (70%)	447	330	252	0	0
17	UKR	Alexandra Nazarova / Maxim Nikitin	2202	2016/2017 season (100%)	362	213	0	250	203
17	UKR	Alexandra Nazarova / Maxim Nikitin	2202	2015/2016 season (100%)	180	213	0	219	178
17	UKR	Alexandra Nazarova / Maxim Nikitin	2202	2014/2015 season (70%)	284	142	127	189	153
18	RUS	Victoria Sinitsina / Nikita Katsalapov	2175	2016/2017 season (100%)	325	292	262	0	0
18	RUS	Victoria Sinitsina / Nikita Katsalapov	2175	2015/2016 season (100%)	612	360	324	0	0
18	RUS	Victoria Sinitsina / Nikita Katsalapov	2175	2014/2015 season (70%)	0	204	149	0	0
19	POL	Natalia Kaliszek / Maksym Spodyriev	2159	2016/2017 season (100%)	402	262	213	250	219
19	POL	Natalia Kaliszek / Maksym Spodyriev	2159	2015/2016 season (100%)	293	0	0	270	250
19	POL	Natalia Kaliszek / Maksym Spodyriev	2159	2014/2015 season (70%)	186	0	0	175	142
20	USA	Rachel Parsons / Michael Parsons	2084	2016/2017 season (100%)	500	350	250	0	0
20	USA	Rachel Parsons / Michael Parsons	2084	2015/2016 season (100%)	450	284	250	0	0
20	USA	Rachel Parsons / Michael Parsons	2084	2014/2015 season (70%)	256	158	142	0	0
21	RUS	Alla Loboda / Pavel Drozd	1985	2016/2017 season (100%)	450	315	250	0	0
21	RUS	Alla Loboda / Pavel Drozd	1985	2015/2016 season (100%)	405	315	250	0	0
21	RUS	Alla Loboda / Pavel Drozd	1985	2014/2015 season (70%)	0	221	175	0	0
22	CHN	Shiyue Wang / Xinyu Liu	1981	2016/2017 season (100%)	446	236	0	0	0
22	CHN	Shiyue Wang / Xinyu Liu	1981	2015/2016 season (100%)	362	236	191	0	0
22	CHN	Shiyue Wang / Xinyu Liu	1981	2014/2015 season (70%)	312	165	0	175	170
23	TUR	Alisa Agafonova / Alper Uçar	1979	2016/2017 season (100%)	293	191	0	243	225
23	TUR	Alisa Agafonova / Alper Uçar	1979	2015/2016 season (100%)	264	213	0	300	250
23	TUR	Alisa Agafonova / Alper Uçar	1979	2014/2015 season (70%)	185	0	0	158	158
24	USA	Lorraine McNamara / Quinn Carpenter	1949	2016/2017 season (100%)	266	284	250	0	0
24	USA	Lorraine McNamara / Quinn Carpenter	1949	2015/2016 season (100%)	500	350	250	0	0
24	USA	Lorraine McNamara / Quinn Carpenter	1949	2014/2015 season (70%)	315	158	142	0	0
25	JPN	Kana Muramoto / Chris Reed	1910	2016/2017 season (100%)	362	191	0	270	203
25	JPN	Kana Muramoto / Chris Reed	1910	2015/2016 season (100%)	446	213	0	225	0
25	JPN	Kana Muramoto / Chris Reed	1910	2014/2015 season (70%)	0	0	0	0	0
26	FRA	Marie-Jade Lauriault / Romain Le Gac	1903	2016/2017 season (100%)	264	236	236	250	198
26	FRA	Marie-Jade Lauriault / Romain Le Gac	1903	2015/2016 season (100%)	239	250	230	0	0
26	FRA	Marie-Jade Lauriault / Romain Le Gac	1903	2014/2015 season (70%)	0	0	0	0	0
27	USA	Elliana Pogrebinsky / Alex Benoit	1791	2016/2017 season (100%)	0	236	213	250	243
27	USA	Elliana Pogrebinsky / Alex Benoit	1791	2015/2016 season (100%)	365	203	182	0	0
27	USA	Elliana Pogrebinsky / Alex Benoit	1791	2014/2015 season (70%)	99	115	84	0	0
28	CAN	Alexandra Paul / Mitchell Islam	1788	2016/2017 season (100%)	0	191	0	243	0
28	CAN	Alexandra Paul / Mitchell Islam	1788	2015/2016 season (100%)	0	236	0	270	0
28	CAN	Alexandra Paul / Mitchell Islam	1788	2014/2015 season (70%)	347	183	165	153	0
29	USA	Anastasia Cannuscio / Colin McManus	1704	2016/2017 season (100%)	0	213	191	0	0
29	USA	Anastasia Cannuscio / Colin McManus	1704	2015/2016 season (100%)	0	262	236	243	219
29	USA	Anastasia Cannuscio / Colin McManus	1704	2014/2015 season (70%)	0	183	0	170	170
30	KOR	Rebeka Kim / Kirill Minov	1663	2016/2017 season (100%)	0	0	0	0	0
30	KOR	Rebeka Kim / Kirill Minov	1663	2015/2016 season (100%)	293	236	0	250	178
30	KOR	Rebeka Kim / Kirill Minov	1663	2014/2015 season (70%)	253	149	134	170	0
31	KOR	Yura Min / Alexander Gamelin	1585	2016/2017 season (100%)	402	0	0	203	198
31	KOR	Yura Min / Alexander Gamelin	1585	2015/2016 season (100%)	402	0	0	198	182
31	KOR	Yura Min / Alexander Gamelin	1585	2014/2015 season (70%)	0	0	0	0	0
32	RUS	Anastasia Shpilevaya / Grigory Smirnov	1467	2016/2017 season (100%)	365	225	225	0	0
32	RUS	Anastasia Shpilevaya / Grigory Smirnov	1467	2015/2016 season (100%)	328	182	0	0	0
32	RUS	Anastasia Shpilevaya / Grigory Smirnov	1467	2014/2015 season (70%)	0	142	76	0	0
33	CAN	Elisabeth Paradis / Francois-Xavier Ouellette	1422	2016/2017 season (100%)	0	0	0	0	0
33	CAN	Elisabeth Paradis / Francois-Xavier Ouellette	1422	2015/2016 season (100%)	496	191	0	243	0
33	CAN	Elisabeth Paradis / Francois-Xavier Ouellette	1422	2014/2015 season (70%)	0	204	149	139	0
34	FRA	Angelique Abachkina / Louis Thauron	1392	2016/2017 season (100%)	239	250	230	0	0
34	FRA	Angelique Abachkina / Louis Thauron	1392	2015/2016 season (100%)	266	225	182	0	0
34	FRA	Angelique Abachkina / Louis Thauron	1392	2014/2015 season (70%)	167	93	93	0	0
35	GER	Kavita Lorenz / Joti Polizoakis	1355	2016/2017 season (100%)	214	0	0	225	225
35	GER	Kavita Lorenz / Joti Polizoakis	1355	2015/2016 season (100%)	222	0	0	250	219
35	GER	Kavita Lorenz / Joti Polizoakis	1355	2014/2015 season (70%)	0	0	0	0	0
36	BLR	Viktoria Kavaliova / Yurii Bieliaiev	1341	2016/2017 season (100%)	113	0	0	164	0
36	BLR	Viktoria Kavaliova / Yurii Bieliaiev	1341	2015/2016 season (100%)	173	213	0	270	219
36	BLR	Viktoria Kavaliova / Yurii Bieliaiev	1341	2014/2015 season (70%)	0	0	0	189	142
37	USA	Christina Carreira / Anthony Ponomarenko	1292	2016/2017 season (100%)	405	255	225	0	0
37	USA	Christina Carreira / Anthony Ponomarenko	1292	2015/2016 season (100%)	0	225	182	0	0
37	USA	Christina Carreira / Anthony Ponomarenko	1292	2014/2015 season (70%)	0	127	115	0	0
38	CZE	Cortney Mansour / Michal Ceska	1278	2016/2017 season (100%)	0	191	0	203	178
38	CZE	Cortney Mansour / Michal Ceska	1278	2015/2016 season (100%)	237	0	0	182	178
38	CZE	Cortney Mansour / Michal Ceska	1278	2014/2015 season (70%)	109	0	0	158	142
39	FIN	Cecilia Törn / Jussiville Partanen	1274	2016/2017 season (100%)	156	0	0	243	182
39	FIN	Cecilia Törn / Jussiville Partanen	1274	2015/2016 season (100%)	200	0	0	250	243
39	FIN	Cecilia Törn / Jussiville Partanen	1274	2014/2015 season (70%)	0	0	0	127	115
40	JPN	Emi Hirai / Marien De La Asuncion	1253	2016/2017 season (100%)	264	0	0	0	0
40	JPN	Emi Hirai / Marien De La Asuncion	1253	2015/2016 season (100%)	264	191	0	219	164
40	JPN	Emi Hirai / Marien De La Asuncion	1253	2014/2015 season (70%)	281	134	0	0	0
41	RUS	Anastasia Skoptcova / Kirill Aleshin	1188	2016/2017 season (100%)	328	225	203	0	0
41	RUS	Anastasia Skoptcova / Kirill Aleshin	1188	2015/2016 season (100%)	0	225	207	0	0
41	RUS	Anastasia Skoptcova / Kirill Aleshin	1188	2014/2015 season (70%)	0	0	0	0	0
42	GER	Katharina Müller / Tim Dieck	1168	2016/2017 season (100%)	0	0	0	250	225
42	GER	Katharina Müller / Tim Dieck	1168	2015/2016 season (100%)	0	0	0	203	203
42	GER	Katharina Müller / Tim Dieck	1168	2014/2015 season (70%)	110	93	84	0	0
43	CZE	Nicole Kuzmichova / Alexandr Sinicyn	1062	2016/2017 season (100%)	215	225	182	0	0
43	CZE	Nicole Kuzmichova / Alexandr Sinicyn	1062	2015/2016 season (100%)	174	133	133	0	0
43	CZE	Nicole Kuzmichova / Alexandr Sinicyn	1062	2014/2015 season (70%)	0	76	76	0	0
44	AUT	Barbora Silná / Juri Kurakin	1049	2016/2017 season (100%)	0	0	0	0	0
44	AUT	Barbora Silná / Juri Kurakin	1049	2015/2016 season (100%)	162	0	0	225	219
44	AUT	Barbora Silná / Juri Kurakin	1049	2014/2015 season (70%)	98	0	0	175	170
45	RUS	Tiffani Zagorski / Jonathan Guerreiro	1025	2016/2017 season (100%)	0	262	0	270	243
45	RUS	Tiffani Zagorski / Jonathan Guerreiro	1025	2015/2016 season (100%)	0	0	0	250	0
45	RUS	Tiffani Zagorski / Jonathan Guerreiro	1025	2014/2015 season (70%)	0	0	0	0	0
46	USA	Julia Biechler / Damian Dodge	969	2016/2017 season (100%)	0	0	0	219	164
46	USA	Julia Biechler / Damian Dodge	969	2015/2016 season (100%)	0	203	164	0	0
46	USA	Julia Biechler / Damian Dodge	969	2014/2015 season (70%)	0	115	104	0	0
47	RUS	Sofia Evdokimova / Egor Bazin	960	2016/2017 season (100%)	0	0	0	203	0
47	RUS	Sofia Evdokimova / Egor Bazin	960	2015/2016 season (100%)	0	203	164	0	0
47	RUS	Sofia Evdokimova / Egor Bazin	960	2014/2015 season (70%)	136	127	127	0	0
48	CAN	Marjorie Lajoie / Zachary Lagha	933	2016/2017 season (100%)	295	182	182	0	0
48	CAN	Marjorie Lajoie / Zachary Lagha	933	2015/2016 season (100%)	141	133	0	0	0
48	CAN	Marjorie Lajoie / Zachary Lagha	933	2014/2015 season (70%)	0	0	0	0	0
49	ARM	Tina Garabedian / Simon Proulx-Senecal	932	2016/2017 season (100%)	126	0	0	198	0
49	ARM	Tina Garabedian / Simon Proulx-Senecal	932	2015/2016 season (100%)	140	0	0	243	225
49	ARM	Tina Garabedian / Simon Proulx-Senecal	932	2014/2015 season (70%)	0	0	0	0	0
50	KOR	Hojung Lee / Richard Kang In Kam	877	2016/2017 season (100%)	237	0	0	0	0
50	KOR	Hojung Lee / Richard Kang In Kam	877	2015/2016 season (100%)	325	182	133	0	0
50	KOR	Hojung Lee / Richard Kang In Kam	877	2014/2015 season (70%)	53	0	0	0	0
51	FIN	Olesia Karmi / Max Lindholm	801	2016/2017 season (100%)	0	0	0	0	0
51	FIN	Olesia Karmi / Max Lindholm	801	2015/2016 season (100%)	0	0	0	243	203
51	FIN	Olesia Karmi / Max Lindholm	801	2014/2015 season (70%)	88	0	0	142	125
52	FRA	Lorenza Alessandrini / Pierre Souquet	799	2016/2017 season (100%)	0	0	0	164	0
52	FRA	Lorenza Alessandrini / Pierre Souquet	799	2015/2016 season (100%)	113	0	0	225	182
52	FRA	Lorenza Alessandrini / Pierre Souquet	799	2014/2015 season (70%)	0	0	0	115	0
53	RUS	Sofia Polishchuk / Alexander Vakhnov	795	2016/2017 season (100%)	0	225	203	0	0
53	RUS	Sofia Polishchuk / Alexander Vakhnov	795	2015/2016 season (100%)	0	203	164	0	0
53	RUS	Sofia Polishchuk / Alexander Vakhnov	795	2014/2015 season (70%)	0	0	0	0	0
54	RUS	Sofia Shevchenko / Igor Eremenko	773	2016/2017 season (100%)	0	203	164	0	0
54	RUS	Sofia Shevchenko / Igor Eremenko	773	2015/2016 season (100%)	0	203	203	0	0
54	RUS	Sofia Shevchenko / Igor Eremenko	773	2014/2015 season (70%)	0	0	0	0	0
55	CAN	Mackenzie Bent / Dmitre Razgulajevs	770	2016/2017 season (100%)	0	0	0	182	0
55	CAN	Mackenzie Bent / Dmitre Razgulajevs	770	2015/2016 season (100%)	215	225	148	0	0
55	CAN	Mackenzie Bent / Dmitre Razgulajevs	770	2014/2015 season (70%)	0	0	0	0	0
56	LAT	Olga Jakushina / Andrey Nevskiy	763	2016/2017 season (100%)	0	0	0	182	178
56	LAT	Olga Jakushina / Andrey Nevskiy	763	2015/2016 season (100%)	0	0	0	225	178
56	LAT	Olga Jakushina / Andrey Nevskiy	763	2014/2015 season (70%)	0	0	0	139	0
57	ESP	Sara Hurtado / Kirill Khaliavin	712	2016/2017 season (100%)	237	0	0	250	225
57	ESP	Sara Hurtado / Kirill Khaliavin	712	2015/2016 season (100%)	0	0	0	0	0
57	ESP	Sara Hurtado / Kirill Khaliavin	712	2014/2015 season (70%)	0	0	0	0	0
58	UKR	Valeria Gaistruk / Alexei Olejnik	704	2016/2017 season (100%)	0	0	0	0	0
58	UKR	Valeria Gaistruk / Alexei Olejnik	704	2015/2016 season (100%)	0	0	0	203	182
58	UKR	Valeria Gaistruk / Alexei Olejnik	704	2014/2015 season (70%)	89	115	115	0	0
59	GBR	Lilah Fear / Lewis Gibson	687	2016/2017 season (100%)	192	0	0	270	225
59	GBR	Lilah Fear / Lewis Gibson	687	2015/2016 season (100%)	0	0	0	0	0
59	GBR	Lilah Fear / Lewis Gibson	687	2014/2015 season (70%)	0	0	0	0	0
60	USA	Chloe Lewis / Logan Bye	679	2016/2017 season (100%)	0	203	148	0	0
60	USA	Chloe Lewis / Logan Bye	679	2015/2016 season (100%)	0	164	164	0	0
60	USA	Chloe Lewis / Logan Bye	679	2014/2015 season (70%)	0	115	0	0	0
61	ESP	Olivia Smart / Adria Diaz	675	2016/2017 season (100%)	200	0	0	250	225
61	ESP	Olivia Smart / Adria Diaz	675	2015/2016 season (100%)	0	0	0	0	0
61	ESP	Olivia Smart / Adria Diaz	675	2014/2015 season (70%)	0	0	0	0	0
62	GER	Ria Schwendinger / Valentin Wunderlich	670	2016/2017 season (100%)	194	133	120	0	0
62	GER	Ria Schwendinger / Valentin Wunderlich	670	2015/2016 season (100%)	103	120	0	0	0
62	GER	Ria Schwendinger / Valentin Wunderlich	670	2014/2015 season (70%)	0	0	0	0	0
63	SVK	Lucie Myslivecková / Lukáš Csölley	666	2016/2017 season (100%)	173	0	0	250	243
63	SVK	Lucie Myslivecková / Lukáš Csölley	666	2015/2016 season (100%)	0	0	0	0	0
63	SVK	Lucie Myslivecková / Lukáš Csölley	666	2014/2015 season (70%)	0	0	0	0	0
64	UKR	Maria Golubtsova / Kirill Belobrov	625	2016/2017 season (100%)	0	164	148	0	0
64	UKR	Maria Golubtsova / Kirill Belobrov	625	2015/2016 season (100%)	83	133	97	0	0
64	UKR	Maria Golubtsova / Kirill Belobrov	625	2014/2015 season (70%)	0	68	0	0	0
65	FRA	Sarah Marine Rouffanche / Geoffrey Brissaud	601	2016/2017 season (100%)	0	148	133	0	0
65	FRA	Sarah Marine Rouffanche / Geoffrey Brissaud	601	2015/2016 season (100%)	0	120	120	0	0
65	FRA	Sarah Marine Rouffanche / Geoffrey Brissaud	601	2014/2015 season (70%)	80	104	84	0	0
66	KAZ	Anastasia Khromova / Daryn Zhunussov	560	2016/2017 season (100%)	0	0	0	0	0
66	KAZ	Anastasia Khromova / Daryn Zhunussov	560	2015/2016 season (100%)	214	0	0	182	164
66	KAZ	Anastasia Khromova / Daryn Zhunussov	560	2014/2015 season (70%)	0	0	0	0	0
67	CAN	Ashlynne Stairs / Lee Royer	544	2016/2017 season (100%)	127	164	133	0	0
67	CAN	Ashlynne Stairs / Lee Royer	544	2015/2016 season (100%)	0	120	0	0	0
67	CAN	Ashlynne Stairs / Lee Royer	544	2014/2015 season (70%)	0	0	0	0	0
68	CAN	Madeline Edwards / Zhao Kai Pang	543	2016/2017 season (100%)	0	0	0	0	0
68	CAN	Madeline Edwards / Zhao Kai Pang	543	2015/2016 season (100%)	0	0	0	0	0
68	CAN	Madeline Edwards / Zhao Kai Pang	543	2014/2015 season (70%)	207	175	161	0	0
69	CAN	Hannah Whitley / Elliott Graham	529	2016/2017 season (100%)	0	164	164	0	0
69	CAN	Hannah Whitley / Elliott Graham	529	2015/2016 season (100%)	0	133	0	0	0
69	CAN	Hannah Whitley / Elliott Graham	529	2014/2015 season (70%)	0	68	0	0	0
70	USA	Danielle Thomas / Daniel Eaton	525	2016/2017 season (100%)	0	0	0	0	0
70	USA	Danielle Thomas / Daniel Eaton	525	2015/2016 season (100%)	0	0	0	300	225
70	USA	Danielle Thomas / Daniel Eaton	525	2014/2015 season (70%)	0	0	0	0	0
71	FRA	Natacha Lagouge / Corentin Rahier	504	2016/2017 season (100%)	174	182	148	0	0
71	FRA	Natacha Lagouge / Corentin Rahier	504	2015/2016 season (100%)	0	0	0	0	0
71	FRA	Natacha Lagouge / Corentin Rahier	504	2014/2015 season (70%)	0	0	0	0	0
72	CHN	Linshu Song / Zhuoming Sun	484	2016/2017 season (100%)	293	191	0	0	0
72	CHN	Linshu Song / Zhuoming Sun	484	2015/2016 season (100%)	0	0	0	0	0
72	CHN	Linshu Song / Zhuoming Sun	484	2014/2015 season (70%)	0	0	0	0	0
73	LTU	Taylor Tran / Saulius Ambrulevičius	482	2016/2017 season (100%)	140	0	0	164	0
73	LTU	Taylor Tran / Saulius Ambrulevičius	482	2015/2016 season (100%)	0	0	0	178	0
73	LTU	Taylor Tran / Saulius Ambrulevičius	482	2014/2015 season (70%)	0	0	0	0	0
74	AUS	Matilda Friend / William Badaoui	462	2016/2017 season (100%)	192	97	0	0	0
74	AUS	Matilda Friend / William Badaoui	462	2015/2016 season (100%)	173	0	0	0	0
74	AUS	Matilda Friend / William Badaoui	462	2014/2015 season (70%)	0	0	0	0	0
75	JPN	Rikako Fukase / Aru Tateno	461	2016/2017 season (100%)	141	148	97	0	0
75	JPN	Rikako Fukase / Aru Tateno	461	2015/2016 season (100%)	75	0	0	0	0
75	JPN	Rikako Fukase / Aru Tateno	461	2014/2015 season (70%)	0	0	0	0	0
76	ESP	Celia Robledo / Luis Fenero	454	2016/2017 season (100%)	0	0	0	164	0
76	ESP	Celia Robledo / Luis Fenero	454	2015/2016 season (100%)	126	0	0	164	0
76	ESP	Celia Robledo / Luis Fenero	454	2014/2015 season (70%)	0	0	0	0	0
77	HUN	Hanna Jakucs / Daniel Illes	426	2016/2017 season (100%)	68	97	97	164	0
77	HUN	Hanna Jakucs / Daniel Illes	426	2015/2016 season (100%)	0	0	0	0	0
77	HUN	Hanna Jakucs / Daniel Illes	426	2014/2015 season (70%)	0	0	0	0	0
78	ISR	Allison Reed / Vasili Rogov	418	2016/2017 season (100%)	0	0	0	0	0
78	ISR	Allison Reed / Vasili Rogov	418	2015/2016 season (100%)	0	0	0	0	0
78	ISR	Allison Reed / Vasili Rogov	418	2014/2015 season (70%)	121	0	0	158	139
79	BLR	Emilia Kalehanava / Uladzislau Palkhouski	417	2016/2017 season (100%)	103	97	0	0	0
79	BLR	Emilia Kalehanava / Uladzislau Palkhouski	417	2015/2016 season (100%)	0	120	97	0	0
79	BLR	Emilia Kalehanava / Uladzislau Palkhouski	417	2014/2015 season (70%)	0	0	0	0	0
80	FRA	Julia Wagret / Mathieu Couyras	414	2016/2017 season (100%)	0	182	164	0	0
80	FRA	Julia Wagret / Mathieu Couyras	414	2015/2016 season (100%)	0	0	0	0	0
80	FRA	Julia Wagret / Mathieu Couyras	414	2014/2015 season (70%)	0	68	0	0	0
81	UKR	Darya Popova / Volodymyr Byelikov	410	2016/2017 season (100%)	157	133	120	0	0
81	UKR	Darya Popova / Volodymyr Byelikov	410	2015/2016 season (100%)	0	0	0	0	0
81	UKR	Darya Popova / Volodymyr Byelikov	410	2014/2015 season (70%)	0	0	0	0	0
82	RUS	Arina Ushakova / Maxim Nekrasov	406	2016/2017 season (100%)	0	203	203	0	0
82	RUS	Arina Ushakova / Maxim Nekrasov	406	2015/2016 season (100%)	0	0	0	0	0
82	RUS	Arina Ushakova / Maxim Nekrasov	406	2014/2015 season (70%)	0	0	0	0	0
83	POL	Justyna Plutowska / Jeremie Flemin	401	2016/2017 season (100%)	0	0	0	219	182
83	POL	Justyna Plutowska / Jeremie Flemin	401	2015/2016 season (100%)	0	0	0	0	0
83	POL	Justyna Plutowska / Jeremie Flemin	401	2014/2015 season (70%)	0	0	0	0	0
83	ITA	Jasmine Tessari / Francesco Fioretti	401	2016/2017 season (100%)	0	0	0	203	198
83	ITA	Jasmine Tessari / Francesco Fioretti	401	2015/2016 season (100%)	0	0	0	0	0
83	ITA	Jasmine Tessari / Francesco Fioretti	401	2014/2015 season (70%)	0	0	0	0	0
83	USA	Karina Manta / Joseph Johnson	401	2016/2017 season (100%)	0	0	0	198	0
83	USA	Karina Manta / Joseph Johnson	401	2015/2016 season (100%)	0	0	0	203	0
83	USA	Karina Manta / Joseph Johnson	401	2014/2015 season (70%)	0	0	0	0	0
86	CHN	Yiyi Zhang / Nan Wu	386	2016/2017 season (100%)	0	0	0	0	0
86	CHN	Yiyi Zhang / Nan Wu	386	2015/2016 season (100%)	237	0	0	0	0
86	CHN	Yiyi Zhang / Nan Wu	386	2014/2015 season (70%)	0	149	0	0	0
87	AZE	Vavara Ogloblina / Mikhail Zhirnov	385	2016/2017 season (100%)	0	0	0	203	182
87	AZE	Vavara Ogloblina / Mikhail Zhirnov	385	2015/2016 season (100%)	0	0	0	0	0
87	AZE	Vavara Ogloblina / Mikhail Zhirnov	385	2014/2015 season (70%)	0	0	0	0	0
88	CHN	Xibei Li / Guangyao Xiang	384	2016/2017 season (100%)	0	0	0	0	0
88	CHN	Xibei Li / Guangyao Xiang	384	2015/2016 season (100%)	192	108	0	0	0
88	CHN	Xibei Li / Guangyao Xiang	384	2014/2015 season (70%)	0	84	0	0	0
89	USA	Charlotte Maxwell / Ryan Devereaux	360	2016/2017 season (100%)	0	0	0	178	0
89	USA	Charlotte Maxwell / Ryan Devereaux	360	2015/2016 season (100%)	0	0	0	182	0
89	USA	Charlotte Maxwell / Ryan Devereaux	360	2014/2015 season (70%)	0	0	0	0	0
90	MEX	Pilar Maekawa Moreno / Leonardo Maekawa Moreno	344	2016/2017 season (100%)	0	0	0	0	0
90	MEX	Pilar Maekawa Moreno / Leonardo Maekawa Moreno	344	2015/2016 season (100%)	0	0	0	0	0
90	MEX	Pilar Maekawa Moreno / Leonardo Maekawa Moreno	344	2014/2015 season (70%)	205	0	0	139	0
91	CAN	Alicia Fabbri / Claudio Pietrantonio	330	2016/2017 season (100%)	0	182	148	0	0
91	CAN	Alicia Fabbri / Claudio Pietrantonio	330	2015/2016 season (100%)	0	0	0	0	0
91	CAN	Alicia Fabbri / Claudio Pietrantonio	330	2014/2015 season (70%)	0	0	0	0	0
92	CHN	Hong Chen / Yan Zhao	325	2016/2017 season (100%)	325	0	0	0	0
92	CHN	Hong Chen / Yan Zhao	325	2015/2016 season (100%)	0	0	0	0	0
92	CHN	Hong Chen / Yan Zhao	325	2014/2015 season (70%)	0	0	0	0	0
93	RUS	Evgenia Kosigina / Nikolai Moroshkin	311	2016/2017 season (100%)	0	0	0	0	0
93	RUS	Evgenia Kosigina / Nikolai Moroshkin	311	2015/2016 season (100%)	0	0	0	0	0
93	RUS	Evgenia Kosigina / Nikolai Moroshkin	311	2014/2015 season (70%)	0	0	0	158	153
94	FRA	Adelina Galayavieva / Laurent Abecassis	284	2016/2017 season (100%)	0	0	0	164	0
94	FRA	Adelina Galayavieva / Laurent Abecassis	284	2015/2016 season (100%)	0	120	0	0	0
94	FRA	Adelina Galayavieva / Laurent Abecassis	284	2014/2015 season (70%)	0	0	0	0	0
95	CAN	Nicole Orford / Asher Hill	250	2016/2017 season (100%)	0	0	0	0	0
95	CAN	Nicole Orford / Asher Hill	250	2015/2016 season (100%)	0	0	0	250	0
95	CAN	Nicole Orford / Asher Hill	250	2014/2015 season (70%)	0	0	0	0	0
96	RUS	Ludmila Sosnitskaia / Pavel Golovishnokov	243	2016/2017 season (100%)	0	0	0	0	0
96	RUS	Ludmila Sosnitskaia / Pavel Golovishnokov	243	2015/2016 season (100%)	0	0	0	243	0
96	RUS	Ludmila Sosnitskaia / Pavel Golovishnokov	243	2014/2015 season (70%)	0	0	0	0	0
97	USA	Emily Day / Kevin Leahy	232	2016/2017 season (100%)	0	0	0	0	0
97	USA	Emily Day / Kevin Leahy	232	2015/2016 season (100%)	0	148	0	0	0
97	USA	Emily Day / Kevin Leahy	232	2014/2015 season (70%)	0	84	0	0	0
98	EST	Viktoria Semenjuk / Artur Gruzdev	228	2016/2017 season (100%)	0	120	108	0	0
98	EST	Viktoria Semenjuk / Artur Gruzdev	228	2015/2016 season (100%)	0	0	0	0	0
98	EST	Viktoria Semenjuk / Artur Gruzdev	228	2014/2015 season (70%)	0	0	0	0	0
98	GBR	Leticia Marsh / Anton Spiridonov	228	2016/2017 season (100%)	0	120	108	0	0
98	GBR	Leticia Marsh / Anton Spiridonov	228	2015/2016 season (100%)	0	0	0	0	0
98	GBR	Leticia Marsh / Anton Spiridonov	228	2014/2015 season (70%)	0	0	0	0	0
100	CAN	Andreanne Poulin / Marc-Andre Servant	225	2016/2017 season (100%)	0	0	0	0	0
100	CAN	Andreanne Poulin / Marc-Andre Servant	225	2015/2016 season (100%)	0	0	0	225	0
100	CAN	Andreanne Poulin / Marc-Andre Servant	225	2014/2015 season (70%)	0	0	0	0	0
101	AUS	Adele Morrison / Demid Rokachev	214	2016/2017 season (100%)	214	0	0	0	0
101	AUS	Adele Morrison / Demid Rokachev	214	2015/2016 season (100%)	0	0	0	0	0
101	AUS	Adele Morrison / Demid Rokachev	214	2014/2015 season (70%)	0	0	0	0	0
102	BLR	Kristsina Kaunatskaia / Yuri Hulitski	205	2016/2017 season (100%)	0	108	97	0	0
102	BLR	Kristsina Kaunatskaia / Yuri Hulitski	205	2015/2016 season (100%)	0	0	0	0	0
102	BLR	Kristsina Kaunatskaia / Yuri Hulitski	205	2014/2015 season (70%)	0	0	0	0	0
102	USA	Eliana Gropman / Ian Somerville	205	2016/2017 season (100%)	0	108	0	0	0
102	USA	Eliana Gropman / Ian Somerville	205	2015/2016 season (100%)	0	97	0	0	0
102	USA	Eliana Gropman / Ian Somerville	205	2014/2015 season (70%)	0	0	0	0	0
104	GBR	Carter Marie Jones / Richard Sharpe	203	2016/2017 season (100%)	0	0	0	0	0
104	GBR	Carter Marie Jones / Richard Sharpe	203	2015/2016 season (100%)	0	0	0	203	0
104	GBR	Carter Marie Jones / Richard Sharpe	203	2014/2015 season (70%)	0	0	0	0	0
104	SUI	Victoria Manni / Carlo Röthlisberger	203	2016/2017 season (100%)	0	0	0	203	0
104	SUI	Victoria Manni / Carlo Röthlisberger	203	2015/2016 season (100%)	0	0	0	0	0
104	SUI	Victoria Manni / Carlo Röthlisberger	203	2014/2015 season (70%)	0	0	0	0	0
106	LTU	Guoste Damuleviciute / Deividas Kizala	201	2016/2017 season (100%)	93	0	0	0	0
106	LTU	Guoste Damuleviciute / Deividas Kizala	201	2015/2016 season (100%)	0	108	0	0	0
106	LTU	Guoste Damuleviciute / Deividas Kizala	201	2014/2015 season (70%)	0	0	0	0	0
107	RUS	Betina Popova / Sergey Mozgov	198	2016/2017 season (100%)	0	0	0	198	0
107	RUS	Betina Popova / Sergey Mozgov	198	2015/2016 season (100%)	0	0	0	0	0
107	RUS	Betina Popova / Sergey Mozgov	198	2014/2015 season (70%)	0	0	0	0	0
108	CAN	Valerie Taillefer / Jason Chan	184	2016/2017 season (100%)	0	0	0	0	0
108	CAN	Valerie Taillefer / Jason Chan	184	2015/2016 season (100%)	0	108	0	0	0
108	CAN	Valerie Taillefer / Jason Chan	184	2014/2015 season (70%)	0	76	0	0	0
109	GEO	Tatiana Kozmava / Alexei Shumski	182	2016/2017 season (100%)	0	0	0	182	0
109	GEO	Tatiana Kozmava / Alexei Shumski	182	2015/2016 season (100%)	0	0	0	0	0
109	GEO	Tatiana Kozmava / Alexei Shumski	182	2014/2015 season (70%)	0	0	0	0	0
109	RUS	Evgeniia Lopareva / Alexey Karpushov	182	2016/2017 season (100%)	0	182	0	0	0
109	RUS	Evgeniia Lopareva / Alexey Karpushov	182	2015/2016 season (100%)	0	0	0	0	0
109	RUS	Evgeniia Lopareva / Alexey Karpushov	182	2014/2015 season (70%)	0	0	0	0	0
109	GER	Shari Koch / Christian Nüchtern	182	2016/2017 season (100%)	0	0	0	182	0
109	GER	Shari Koch / Christian Nüchtern	182	2015/2016 season (100%)	0	0	0	0	0
109	GER	Shari Koch / Christian Nüchtern	182	2014/2015 season (70%)	0	0	0	0	0
112	POL	Olexandra Borysova / Cezary Zawadzki	176	2016/2017 season (100%)	0	108	0	0	0
112	POL	Olexandra Borysova / Cezary Zawadzki	176	2015/2016 season (100%)	68	0	0	0	0
112	POL	Olexandra Borysova / Cezary Zawadzki	176	2014/2015 season (70%)	0	0	0	0	0
113	AUS	Kimberley Hew-Low / Timothy McKernan	173	2016/2017 season (100%)	173	0	0	0	0
113	AUS	Kimberley Hew-Low / Timothy McKernan	173	2015/2016 season (100%)	0	0	0	0	0
113	AUS	Kimberley Hew-Low / Timothy McKernan	173	2014/2015 season (70%)	0	0	0	0	0
114	ISR	Adel Tankova / Ronald Zilberberg	164	2016/2017 season (100%)	0	0	0	164	0
114	ISR	Adel Tankova / Ronald Zilberberg	164	2015/2016 season (100%)	0	0	0	0	0
114	ISR	Adel Tankova / Ronald Zilberberg	164	2014/2015 season (70%)	0	0	0	0	0
114	RUS	Polina Ivanenko / Daniil Karpov	164	2016/2017 season (100%)	0	164	0	0	0
114	RUS	Polina Ivanenko / Daniil Karpov	164	2015/2016 season (100%)	0	0	0	0	0
114	RUS	Polina Ivanenko / Daniil Karpov	164	2014/2015 season (70%)	0	0	0	0	0
114	USA	Alissandra Aronow / Collin Brubaker	164	2016/2017 season (100%)	0	0	0	0	0
114	USA	Alissandra Aronow / Collin Brubaker	164	2015/2016 season (100%)	0	0	0	164	0
114	USA	Alissandra Aronow / Collin Brubaker	164	2014/2015 season (70%)	0	0	0	0	0
114	TUR	Cagla Demirsal / Berk Akalin	164	2016/2017 season (100%)	0	0	0	164	0
114	TUR	Cagla Demirsal / Berk Akalin	164	2015/2016 season (100%)	0	0	0	0	0
114	TUR	Cagla Demirsal / Berk Akalin	164	2014/2015 season (70%)	0	0	0	0	0
118	CAN	Haley Sales / Nikolas Wamsteeker	148	2016/2017 season (100%)	0	0	0	0	0
118	CAN	Haley Sales / Nikolas Wamsteeker	148	2015/2016 season (100%)	0	148	0	0	0
118	CAN	Haley Sales / Nikolas Wamsteeker	148	2014/2015 season (70%)	0	0	0	0	0
118	USA	Gigi Becker / Luca Becker	148	2016/2017 season (100%)	0	0	0	0	0
118	USA	Gigi Becker / Luca Becker	148	2015/2016 season (100%)	0	148	0	0	0
118	USA	Gigi Becker / Luca Becker	148	2014/2015 season (70%)	0	0	0	0	0
118	RUS	Eva Kuts / Dmitrii Mikhailov	148	2016/2017 season (100%)	0	148	0	0	0
118	RUS	Eva Kuts / Dmitrii Mikhailov	148	2015/2016 season (100%)	0	0	0	0	0
118	RUS	Eva Kuts / Dmitrii Mikhailov	148	2014/2015 season (70%)	0	0	0	0	0
121	CAN	Danielle Wu / Nik Mirzakhani	133	2016/2017 season (100%)	0	133	0	0	0
121	CAN	Danielle Wu / Nik Mirzakhani	133	2015/2016 season (100%)	0	0	0	0	0
121	CAN	Danielle Wu / Nik Mirzakhani	133	2014/2015 season (70%)	0	0	0	0	0
121	USA	Emma Gunter / Caleb Wein	133	2016/2017 season (100%)	0	133	0	0	0
121	USA	Emma Gunter / Caleb Wein	133	2015/2016 season (100%)	0	0	0	0	0
121	USA	Emma Gunter / Caleb Wein	133	2014/2015 season (70%)	0	0	0	0	0
121	FRA	Salome Abdedou / Dylan Antunes	133	2016/2017 season (100%)	0	133	0	0	0
121	FRA	Salome Abdedou / Dylan Antunes	133	2015/2016 season (100%)	0	0	0	0	0
121	FRA	Salome Abdedou / Dylan Antunes	133	2014/2015 season (70%)	0	0	0	0	0
124	FRA	Loica Demougeot / Theo Le Mercier	120	2016/2017 season (100%)	0	120	0	0	0
124	FRA	Loica Demougeot / Theo Le Mercier	120	2015/2016 season (100%)	0	0	0	0	0
124	FRA	Loica Demougeot / Theo Le Mercier	120	2014/2015 season (70%)	0	0	0	0	0
124	EST	Katerina Bunina / German Frolov	120	2016/2017 season (100%)	0	120	0	0	0
124	EST	Katerina Bunina / German Frolov	120	2015/2016 season (100%)	0	0	0	0	0
124	EST	Katerina Bunina / German Frolov	120	2014/2015 season (70%)	0	0	0	0	0
124	CAN	Seungyun Han / Grayson Lochhead	120	2016/2017 season (100%)	0	120	0	0	0
124	CAN	Seungyun Han / Grayson Lochhead	120	2015/2016 season (100%)	0	0	0	0	0
124	CAN	Seungyun Han / Grayson Lochhead	120	2014/2015 season (70%)	0	0	0	0	0
127	GBR	Sasha Fear / Elliot Verburg	114	2016/2017 season (100%)	114	0	0	0	0
127	GBR	Sasha Fear / Elliot Verburg	114	2015/2016 season (100%)	0	0	0	0	0
127	GBR	Sasha Fear / Elliot Verburg	114	2014/2015 season (70%)	0	0	0	0	0
128	GER	Sarah Michelle Knispel / Maximilian Voigtländer	108	2016/2017 season (100%)	0	108	0	0	0
128	GER	Sarah Michelle Knispel / Maximilian Voigtländer	108	2015/2016 season (100%)	0	0	0	0	0
128	GER	Sarah Michelle Knispel / Maximilian Voigtländer	108	2014/2015 season (70%)	0	0	0	0	0
128	CHN	Yuzhu Guo / Pengkun Zhao	108	2016/2017 season (100%)	0	108	0	0	0
128	CHN	Yuzhu Guo / Pengkun Zhao	108	2015/2016 season (100%)	0	0	0	0	0
128	CHN	Yuzhu Guo / Pengkun Zhao	108	2014/2015 season (70%)	0	0	0	0	0
130	GBR	Ekaterina Fedyushchenko / Lucas Kitteridge	97	2016/2017 season (100%)	0	0	0	0	0
130	GBR	Ekaterina Fedyushchenko / Lucas Kitteridge	97	2015/2016 season (100%)	0	97	0	0	0
130	GBR	Ekaterina Fedyushchenko / Lucas Kitteridge	97	2014/2015 season (70%)	0	0	0	0	0
130	AUT	Elizaveta Orlova / Stephano Valentino Schuster	97	2016/2017 season (100%)	0	97	0	0	0
130	AUT	Elizaveta Orlova / Stephano Valentino Schuster	97	2015/2016 season (100%)	0	0	0	0	0
130	AUT	Elizaveta Orlova / Stephano Valentino Schuster	97	2014/2015 season (70%)	0	0	0	0	0
132	GEO	Eva Khachaturian / Georgy Reviya	83	2016/2017 season (100%)	83	0	0	0	0
132	GEO	Eva Khachaturian / Georgy Reviya	83	2015/2016 season (100%)	0	0	0	0	0
132	GEO	Eva Khachaturian / Georgy Reviya	83	2014/2015 season (70%)	0	0	0	0	0
133	FIN	Monica Lindfors / Juho Pirinen	75	2016/2017 season (100%)	75	0	0	0	0
133	FIN	Monica Lindfors / Juho Pirinen	75	2015/2016 season (100%)	0	0	0	0	0
133	FIN	Monica Lindfors / Juho Pirinen	75	2014/2015 season (70%)	0	0	0	0	0

== World standings for synchronized skating ==
=== Season-end standings ===
The remainder of this section is a complete list, by level, published by the ISU.

==== Senior Synchronized (53 teams) ====
As of 9 April 2017

Rank	Nation	Team	Points	Season	ISU World Championships (Junior or Senior)	Selected International Competition	
Rank	Nation	Team	Points	Season	Best	Best	2nd Best
1	RUS	Team Paradise	3280	2016/2017 season (100%)	840	400	400
1	RUS	Team Paradise	3280	2015/2016 season (100%)	840	400	400
1	RUS	Team Paradise	3280	2014/2015 season (70%)	476	204	0
2	FIN	Team Rockettes	2827	2016/2017 season (100%)	551	400	360
2	FIN	Team Rockettes	2827	2015/2016 season (100%)	756	400	360
2	FIN	Team Rockettes	2827	2014/2015 season (70%)	428	252	252
3	FIN	Team Marigold Ice Unity	2765	2016/2017 season (100%)	756	400	400
3	FIN	Team Marigold Ice Unity	2765	2015/2016 season (100%)	0	400	0
3	FIN	Team Marigold Ice Unity	2765	2014/2015 season (70%)	529	280	280
4	USA	Team Haydenettes	2599	2016/2017 season (100%)	612	360	360
4	USA	Team Haydenettes	2599	2015/2016 season (100%)	680	360	0
4	USA	Team Haydenettes	2599	2014/2015 season (70%)	312	227	165
5	CAN	Team NEXXICE	2520	2016/2017 season (100%)	680	400	292
5	CAN	Team NEXXICE	2520	2015/2016 season (100%)	446	0	0
5	CAN	Team NEXXICE	2520	2014/2015 season (70%)	588	280	280
6	CAN	Team Les Suprêmes Seniors	2289	2016/2017 season (100%)	402	360	324
6	CAN	Team Les Suprêmes Seniors	2289	2015/2016 season (100%)	551	360	292
6	CAN	Team Les Suprêmes Seniors	2289	2014/2015 season (70%)	347	280	183
7	USA	Team Miami University	1950	2016/2017 season (100%)	0	360	0
7	USA	Team Miami University	1950	2015/2016 season (100%)	362	360	360
7	USA	Team Miami University	1950	2014/2015 season (70%)	281	227	0
8	SWE	Team Surprise	1918	2016/2017 season (100%)	446	0	0
8	SWE	Team Surprise	1918	2015/2016 season (100%)	496	400	324
8	SWE	Team Surprise	1918	2014/2015 season (70%)	386	252	0
9	FIN	Team Unique	1836	2016/2017 season (100%)	0	324	0
9	FIN	Team Unique	1836	2015/2016 season (100%)	612	324	324
9	FIN	Team Unique	1836	2014/2015 season (70%)	0	252	227
10	RUS	Team Tatarstan	1826	2016/2017 season (100%)	496	400	0
10	RUS	Team Tatarstan	1826	2015/2016 season (100%)	402	324	0
10	RUS	Team Tatarstan	1826	2014/2015 season (70%)	253	204	0
11	GER	Team Berlin 1	1795	2016/2017 season (100%)	325	360	292
11	GER	Team Berlin 1	1795	2015/2016 season (100%)	264	292	262
11	GER	Team Berlin 1	1795	2014/2015 season (70%)	228	227	183
12	HUN	Team Passion	1752	2016/2017 season (100%)	192	324	324
12	HUN	Team Passion	1752	2015/2016 season (100%)	192	360	360
12	HUN	Team Passion	1752	2014/2015 season (70%)	109	252	134
13	FRA	Team Zoulous	1713	2016/2017 season (100%)	293	360	213
13	FRA	Team Zoulous	1713	2015/2016 season (100%)	293	292	262
13	FRA	Team Zoulous	1713	2014/2015 season (70%)	150	0	0
14	SWE	Team Boomerang	1707	2016/2017 season (100%)	237	262	191
14	SWE	Team Boomerang	1707	2015/2016 season (100%)	325	400	292
14	SWE	Team Boomerang	1707	2014/2015 season (70%)	205	149	0
15	ITA	Team Hot Shivers	1535	2016/2017 season (100%)	214	324	262
15	ITA	Team Hot Shivers	1535	2015/2016 season (100%)	237	262	236
15	ITA	Team Hot Shivers	1535	2014/2015 season (70%)	166	165	149
16	CZE	Team Olympia	1469	2016/2017 season (100%)	156	262	262
16	CZE	Team Olympia	1469	2015/2016 season (100%)	173	324	292
16	CZE	Team Olympia	1469	2014/2015 season (70%)	121	227	134
17	SUI	Team Cool Dreams	1413	2016/2017 season (100%)	173	262	236
17	SUI	Team Cool Dreams	1413	2015/2016 season (100%)	156	324	262
17	SUI	Team Cool Dreams	1413	2014/2015 season (70%)	134	165	149
18	USA	Team Dearbom Crystallettes	1365	2016/2017 season (100%)	362	324	262
18	USA	Team Dearbom Crystallettes	1365	2015/2016 season (100%)	0	213	0
18	USA	Team Dearbom Crystallettes	1365	2014/2015 season (70%)	0	204	0
19	USA	Team Skyliners	1199	2016/2017 season (100%)	0	400	324
19	USA	Team Skyliners	1199	2015/2016 season (100%)	0	292	0
19	USA	Team Skyliners	1199	2014/2015 season (70%)	0	183	0
20	GER	Team Skating Graces	1152	2016/2017 season (100%)	0	236	0
20	GER	Team Skating Graces	1152	2015/2016 season (100%)	0	400	236
20	GER	Team Skating Graces	1152	2014/2015 season (70%)	0	280	149
21	GBR	Team Spirit	1098	2016/2017 season (100%)	0	292	191
21	GBR	Team Spirit	1098	2015/2016 season (100%)	0	292	0
21	GBR	Team Spirit	1098	2014/2015 season (70%)	71	252	0
22	FIN	Team Revolutions	1026	2016/2017 season (100%)	0	292	236
22	FIN	Team Revolutions	1026	2015/2016 season (100%)	0	262	236
22	FIN	Team Revolutions	1026	2014/2015 season (70%)	0	204	134
23	CRO	Team Zagreb Snowflakes	1019	2016/2017 season (100%)	126	292	213
23	CRO	Team Zagreb Snowflakes	1019	2015/2016 season (100%)	126	262	0
23	CRO	Team Zagreb Snowflakes	1019	2014/2015 season (70%)	98	0	0
24	GBR	Team Zariba	998	2016/2017 season (100%)	102	324	0
24	GBR	Team Zariba	998	2015/2016 season (100%)	83	262	0
24	GBR	Team Zariba	998	2014/2015 season (70%)	0	227	0
25	AUS	Team Ice Storms	949	2016/2017 season (100%)	0	262	191
25	AUS	Team Ice Storms	949	2015/2016 season (100%)	0	292	0
25	AUS	Team Ice Storms	949	2014/2015 season (70%)	0	204	0
26	USA	Team Del Sol	760	2016/2017 season (100%)	0	360	0
26	USA	Team Del Sol	760	2015/2016 season (100%)	0	400	0
26	USA	Team Del Sol	760	2014/2015 season (70%)	0	0	0
27	JPN	Team Jingu Ice Messengers Grace	714	2016/2017 season (100%)	264	0	0
27	JPN	Team Jingu Ice Messengers Grace	714	2015/2016 season (100%)	214	236	0
27	JPN	Team Jingu Ice Messengers Grace	714	2014/2015 season (70%)	185	0	0
28	GBR	Team Wight Jewels Senior	711	2016/2017 season (100%)	0	262	213
28	GBR	Team Wight Jewels Senior	711	2015/2016 season (100%)	0	236	0
28	GBR	Team Wight Jewels Senior	711	2014/2015 season (70%)	0	0	0
29	ITA	Team Flying Angels	679	2016/2017 season (100%)	0	213	0
29	ITA	Team Flying Angels	679	2015/2016 season (100%)	0	262	0
29	ITA	Team Flying Angels	679	2014/2015 season (70%)	0	204	0
30	AUS	Team Nova Seniors	628	2016/2017 season (100%)	0	0	0
30	AUS	Team Nova Seniors	628	2015/2016 season (100%)	113	324	191
30	AUS	Team Nova Seniors	628	2014/2015 season (70%)	0	0	0
31	CZE	Team Balance	575	2016/2017 season (100%)	0	0	0
31	CZE	Team Balance	575	2015/2016 season (100%)	0	213	213
31	CZE	Team Balance	575	2014/2015 season (70%)	0	149	0
32	USA	Team Adrian College	505	2016/2017 season (100%)	0	292	0
32	USA	Team Adrian College	505	2015/2016 season (100%)	0	213	0
32	USA	Team Adrian College	505	2014/2015 season (70%)	0	0	0
33	ESP	Team Fusion	478	2016/2017 season (100%)	140	236	0
33	ESP	Team Fusion	478	2015/2016 season (100%)	102	0	0
33	ESP	Team Fusion	478	2014/2015 season (70%)	88	0	0
34	ITA	Team Shining Blades	401	2016/2017 season (100%)	0	0	0
34	ITA	Team Shining Blades	401	2015/2016 season (100%)	0	236	0
34	ITA	Team Shining Blades	401	2014/2015 season (70%)	0	165	0
35	USA	Team Starlight	400	2016/2017 season (100%)	0	400	0
35	USA	Team Starlight	400	2015/2016 season (100%)	0	0	0
35	USA	Team Starlight	400	2014/2015 season (70%)	0	0	0
36	USA	Team Ice'Kateers	360	2016/2017 season (100%)	0	0	0
36	USA	Team Ice'Kateers	360	2015/2016 season (100%)	0	360	0
36	USA	Team Ice'Kateers	360	2014/2015 season (70%)	0	0	0
37	TUR	Team Turquoise	330	2016/2017 season (100%)	74	0	0
37	TUR	Team Turquoise	330	2015/2016 season (100%)	0	0	0
37	TUR	Team Turquoise	330	2014/2015 season (70%)	52	204	0
38	CAN	Team Meraki	324	2016/2017 season (100%)	0	0	0
38	CAN	Team Meraki	324	2015/2016 season (100%)	0	324	0
38	CAN	Team Meraki	324	2014/2015 season (70%)	0	0	0
39	AUT	Team Sweet Mozart	319	2016/2017 season (100%)	83	236	0
39	AUT	Team Sweet Mozart	319	2015/2016 season (100%)	0	0	0
39	AUT	Team Sweet Mozart	319	2014/2015 season (70%)	0	0	0
40	RUS	Team Dream Team	292	2016/2017 season (100%)	0	292	0
40	RUS	Team Dream Team	292	2015/2016 season (100%)	0	0	0
40	RUS	Team Dream Team	292	2014/2015 season (70%)	0	0	0
41	LAT	Team Amber	287	2016/2017 season (100%)	0	0	0
41	LAT	Team Amber	287	2015/2016 season (100%)	74	213	0
41	LAT	Team Amber	287	2014/2015 season (70%)	0	0	0
42	TUR	Team Vizyon	236	2016/2017 season (100%)	0	236	0
42	TUR	Team Vizyon	236	2015/2016 season (100%)	0	0	0
42	TUR	Team Vizyon	236	2014/2015 season (70%)	0	0	0
43	FRA	Team Black Diam'S Senior	213	2016/2017 season (100%)	0	0	0
43	FRA	Team Black Diam'S Senior	213	2015/2016 season (100%)	0	213	0
43	FRA	Team Black Diam'S Senior	213	2014/2015 season (70%)	0	0	0
43	GEO	Team Ice Lions Batumi	213	2016/2017 season (100%)	0	213	0
43	GEO	Team Ice Lions Batumi	213	2015/2016 season (100%)	0	0	0
43	GEO	Team Ice Lions Batumi	213	2014/2015 season (70%)	0	0	0
43	NED	Team Ice United	213	2016/2017 season (100%)	0	213	0
43	NED	Team Ice United	213	2015/2016 season (100%)	0	0	0
43	NED	Team Ice United	213	2014/2015 season (70%)	0	0	0
46	MEX	Team Merging Edge	204	2016/2017 season (100%)	0	0	0
46	MEX	Team Merging Edge	204	2015/2016 season (100%)	140	0	0
46	MEX	Team Merging Edge	204	2014/2015 season (70%)	64	0	0
47	AUS	Team Infusion	192	2016/2017 season (100%)	113	0	0
47	AUS	Team Infusion	192	2015/2016 season (100%)	0	0	0
47	AUS	Team Infusion	192	2014/2015 season (70%)	79	0	0
48	CZE	Team Kometa	191	2016/2017 season (100%)	0	191	0
48	CZE	Team Kometa	191	2015/2016 season (100%)	0	0	0
48	CZE	Team Kometa	191	2014/2015 season (70%)	0	0	0
49	GBR	Team Moray Dolphins	183	2016/2017 season (100%)	0	0	0
49	GBR	Team Moray Dolphins	183	2015/2016 season (100%)	0	0	0
49	GBR	Team Moray Dolphins	183	2014/2015 season (70%)	0	183	0
50	RUS	Team Crystal	165	2016/2017 season (100%)	0	0	0
50	RUS	Team Crystal	165	2015/2016 season (100%)	0	0	0
50	RUS	Team Crystal	165	2014/2015 season (70%)	0	165	0
51	BEL	Team Temptation	150	2016/2017 season (100%)	0	0	0
51	BEL	Team Temptation	150	2015/2016 season (100%)	92	0	0
51	BEL	Team Temptation	150	2014/2015 season (70%)	58	0	0
52	GER	Team United Angels	134	2016/2017 season (100%)	0	0	0
52	GER	Team United Angels	134	2015/2016 season (100%)	0	0	0
52	GER	Team United Angels	134	2014/2015 season (70%)	0	134	0
53	NED	Team Illumination	92	2016/2017 season (100%)	92	0	0
53	NED	Team Illumination	92	2015/2016 season (100%)	0	0	0
53	NED	Team Illumination	92	2014/2015 season (70%)	0	0	0

==== Junior Synchronized (66 teams) ====
As of 16 March 2017

Rank	Nation	Team	Points	Season	ISU World Championships (Junior or Senior)	Selected International Competition	
Rank	Nation	Team	Points	Season	Best	Best	2nd Best
1	USA	Team Skyliners Junior	1780	2016/2017 season (100%)	437	250	203
1	USA	Team Skyliners Junior	1780	2015/2016 season (100%)	437	250	203
1	USA	Team Skyliners Junior	1780	2014/2015 season (70%)	248	115	0
2	FIN	Team Fintastic Junior	1672	2016/2017 season (100%)	540	225	0
2	FIN	Team Fintastic Junior	1672	2015/2016 season (100%)	540	225	0
2	FIN	Team Fintastic Junior	1672	2014/2015 season (70%)	378	142	0
3	CAN	Team Les Suprêmes Junior	1629	2016/2017 season (100%)	354	250	0
3	CAN	Team Les Suprêmes Junior	1629	2015/2016 season (100%)	600	250	0
3	CAN	Team Les Suprêmes Junior	1629	2014/2015 season (70%)	340	175	0
4	FIN	Team Musketeers Junior	1509	2016/2017 season (100%)	486	203	0
4	FIN	Team Musketeers Junior	1509	2015/2016 season (100%)	394	225	0
4	FIN	Team Musketeers Junior	1509	2014/2015 season (70%)	420	175	0
5	RUS	Team Spartak-Junost Junior	1494	2016/2017 season (100%)	600	250	0
5	RUS	Team Spartak-Junost Junior	1494	2015/2016 season (100%)	486	0	0
5	RUS	Team Spartak-Junost Junior	1494	2014/2015 season (70%)	223	158	0
6	RUS	Team Crystal Ice Junior	1335	2016/2017 season (100%)	287	250	0
6	RUS	Team Crystal Ice Junior	1335	2015/2016 season (100%)	354	250	0
6	RUS	Team Crystal Ice Junior	1335	2014/2015 season (70%)	306	175	0
7	CAN	Team NEXXICE Junior	1289	2016/2017 season (100%)	394	225	0
7	CAN	Team NEXXICE Junior	1289	2015/2016 season (100%)	287	225	0
7	CAN	Team NEXXICE Junior	1289	2014/2015 season (70%)	276	158	0
8	USA	Team Lexettes Junior	1271	2016/2017 season (100%)	319	250	0
8	USA	Team Lexettes Junior	1271	2015/2016 season (100%)	319	225	0
8	USA	Team Lexettes Junior	1271	2014/2015 season (70%)	201	158	0
9	SWE	Team Convivium Junior	1234	2016/2017 season (100%)	258	225	148
9	SWE	Team Convivium Junior	1234	2015/2016 season (100%)	209	203	164
9	SWE	Team Convivium Junior	1234	2014/2015 season (70%)	162	175	142
10	SWE	Team Spirit Junior	1208	2016/2017 season (100%)	232	148	133
10	SWE	Team Spirit Junior	1208	2015/2016 season (100%)	258	225	203
10	SWE	Team Spirit Junior	1208	2014/2015 season (70%)	181	142	127
11	GER	Team Berlin Junior	1129	2016/2017 season (100%)	209	250	203
11	GER	Team Berlin Junior	1129	2015/2016 season (100%)	232	120	0
11	GER	Team Berlin Junior	1129	2014/2015 season (70%)	146	115	115
12	ITA	Team Hot Shivers Junior	1061	2016/2017 season (100%)	188	225	164
12	ITA	Team Hot Shivers Junior	1061	2015/2016 season (100%)	169	182	133
12	ITA	Team Hot Shivers Junior	1061	2014/2015 season (70%)	132	104	93
13	SUI	Team Cool Dreams Junior	909	2016/2017 season (100%)	137	203	120
13	SUI	Team Cool Dreams Junior	909	2015/2016 season (100%)	153	148	148
13	SUI	Team Cool Dreams Junior	909	2014/2015 season (70%)	118	84	76
14	USA	Team Chicago Jazz Junior	846	2016/2017 season (100%)	0	182	164
14	USA	Team Chicago Jazz Junior	846	2015/2016 season (100%)	0	250	250
14	USA	Team Chicago Jazz Junior	846	2014/2015 season (70%)	0	104	0
15	GBR	Team Icicles Juniors	663	2016/2017 season (100%)	100	225	97
15	GBR	Team Icicles Juniors	663	2015/2016 season (100%)	137	97	0
15	GBR	Team Icicles Juniors	663	2014/2015 season (70%)	107	0	0
16	FIN	Team Reflections Junior	621	2016/2017 season (100%)	0	164	0
16	FIN	Team Reflections Junior	621	2015/2016 season (100%)	0	182	148
16	FIN	Team Reflections Junior	621	2014/2015 season (70%)	0	127	0
17	FRA	Team Jeanne D'Arc Junior	609	2016/2017 season (100%)	153	203	133
17	FRA	Team Jeanne D'Arc Junior	609	2015/2016 season (100%)	0	120	0
17	FRA	Team Jeanne D'Arc Junior	609	2014/2015 season (70%)	0	0	0
18	CZE	Team Darlings Junior	585	2016/2017 season (100%)	169	120	0
18	CZE	Team Darlings Junior	585	2015/2016 season (100%)	188	108	0
18	CZE	Team Darlings Junior	585	2014/2015 season (70%)	96	0	0
19	FIN	Team Dream Edges Junior	534	2016/2017 season (100%)	0	225	0
19	FIN	Team Dream Edges Junior	534	2015/2016 season (100%)	0	182	0
19	FIN	Team Dream Edges Junior	534	2014/2015 season (70%)	0	127	0
20	FIN	Team Mystique Junior	522	2016/2017 season (100%)	0	182	0
20	FIN	Team Mystique Junior	522	2015/2016 season (100%)	0	182	0
20	FIN	Team Mystique Junior	522	2014/2015 season (70%)	0	158	0
21	ITA	Team Ladybirds Junior	513	2016/2017 season (100%)	0	164	148
21	ITA	Team Ladybirds Junior	513	2015/2016 season (100%)	0	133	0
21	ITA	Team Ladybirds Junior	513	2014/2015 season (70%)	0	68	68
22	CAN	Team Les Pirouettes De Laval Junior	509	2016/2017 season (100%)	0	203	0
22	CAN	Team Les Pirouettes De Laval Junior	509	2015/2016 season (100%)	0	164	0
22	CAN	Team Les Pirouettes De Laval Junior	509	2014/2015 season (70%)	0	142	0
23	FIN	Team Sun City Swing Junior	489	2016/2017 season (100%)	0	182	0
23	FIN	Team Sun City Swing Junior	489	2015/2016 season (100%)	0	203	0
23	FIN	Team Sun City Swing Junior	489	2014/2015 season (70%)	0	104	0
24	FIN	Team Fireblades Junior	488	2016/2017 season (100%)	0	148	0
24	FIN	Team Fireblades Junior	488	2015/2016 season (100%)	0	182	0
24	FIN	Team Fireblades Junior	488	2014/2015 season (70%)	0	158	0
25	FIN	Team Valley Bay Synchro Junior	463	2016/2017 season (100%)	0	203	0
25	FIN	Team Valley Bay Synchro Junior	463	2015/2016 season (100%)	0	133	0
25	FIN	Team Valley Bay Synchro Junior	463	2014/2015 season (70%)	0	127	0
26	ITA	Team Shining Blades Junior	450	2016/2017 season (100%)	0	148	120
26	ITA	Team Shining Blades Junior	450	2015/2016 season (100%)	0	182	0
26	ITA	Team Shining Blades Junior	450	2014/2015 season (70%)	0	0	0
27	AUS	Team Iceskateers Elite Juniors	424	2016/2017 season (100%)	0	182	164
27	AUS	Team Iceskateers Elite Juniors	424	2015/2016 season (100%)	0	0	0
27	AUS	Team Iceskateers Elite Juniors	424	2014/2015 season (70%)	78	0	0
28	FIN	Team Stella Polaris Junior	423	2016/2017 season (100%)	0	133	0
28	FIN	Team Stella Polaris Junior	423	2015/2016 season (100%)	0	148	0
28	FIN	Team Stella Polaris Junior	423	2014/2015 season (70%)	0	142	0
29	ITA	Team Ice On Fire Junior	422	2016/2017 season (100%)	0	182	0
29	ITA	Team Ice On Fire Junior	422	2015/2016 season (100%)	0	164	0
29	ITA	Team Ice On Fire Junior	422	2014/2015 season (70%)	0	76	0
30	SWE	Team Moonlights Junior	411	2016/2017 season (100%)	0	97	97
30	SWE	Team Moonlights Junior	411	2015/2016 season (100%)	0	133	0
30	SWE	Team Moonlights Junior	411	2014/2015 season (70%)	0	84	76
31	ESP	Team Mirum Junior	407	2016/2017 season (100%)	111	0	0
31	ESP	Team Mirum Junior	407	2015/2016 season (100%)	100	120	0
31	ESP	Team Mirum Junior	407	2014/2015 season (70%)	63	76	0
32	RUS	Team Sunrise 1 Junior	389	2016/2017 season (100%)	0	225	0
32	RUS	Team Sunrise 1 Junior	389	2015/2016 season (100%)	0	164	0
32	RUS	Team Sunrise 1 Junior	389	2014/2015 season (70%)	0	0	0
33	FIN	Team Ice Steps Junior	377	2016/2017 season (100%)	0	120	0
33	FIN	Team Ice Steps Junior	377	2015/2016 season (100%)	0	164	0
33	FIN	Team Ice Steps Junior	377	2014/2015 season (70%)	0	93	0
34	ITA	Team Ice Diamonds Junior	373	2016/2017 season (100%)	0	133	0
34	ITA	Team Ice Diamonds Junior	373	2015/2016 season (100%)	0	120	120
34	ITA	Team Ice Diamonds Junior	373	2014/2015 season (70%)	0	0	0
35	GER	Team Starlets Junior 2	334	2016/2017 season (100%)	0	0	0
35	GER	Team Starlets Junior 2	334	2015/2016 season (100%)	0	250	0
35	GER	Team Starlets Junior 2	334	2014/2015 season (70%)	0	84	0
36	CRO	Team Zagreb Snowflakes Junior	314	2016/2017 season (100%)	0	133	0
36	CRO	Team Zagreb Snowflakes Junior	314	2015/2016 season (100%)	111	0	0
36	CRO	Team Zagreb Snowflakes Junior	314	2014/2015 season (70%)	70	0	0
37	USA	Team Hockettes Junior	291	2016/2017 season (100%)	0	164	0
37	USA	Team Hockettes Junior	291	2015/2016 season (100%)	0	0	0
37	USA	Team Hockettes Junior	291	2014/2015 season (70%)	0	127	0
38	HUN	Team Mixed Ice Formation Junior	260	2016/2017 season (100%)	0	0	0
38	HUN	Team Mixed Ice Formation Junior	260	2015/2016 season (100%)	0	203	0
38	HUN	Team Mixed Ice Formation Junior	260	2014/2015 season (70%)	57	0	0
39	SWE	Team Nova Junior	256	2016/2017 season (100%)	0	108	0
39	SWE	Team Nova Junior	256	2015/2016 season (100%)	0	148	0
39	SWE	Team Nova Junior	256	2014/2015 season (70%)	0	0	0
40	USA	Team Starlight	250	2016/2017 season (100%)	0	250	0
40	USA	Team Starlight	250	2015/2016 season (100%)	0	0	0
40	USA	Team Starlight	250	2014/2015 season (70%)	0	0	0
41	CZE	Team Starlets Junior	225	2016/2017 season (100%)	0	0	0
41	CZE	Team Starlets Junior	225	2015/2016 season (100%)	0	225	0
41	CZE	Team Starlets Junior	225	2014/2015 season (70%)	0	0	0
42	FRA	Team Zazou Junior	205	2016/2017 season (100%)	0	108	0
42	FRA	Team Zazou Junior	205	2015/2016 season (100%)	0	97	0
42	FRA	Team Zazou Junior	205	2014/2015 season (70%)	0	0	0
43	USA	Team Fond du Lac Blades Junior	203	2016/2017 season (100%)	0	0	0
43	USA	Team Fond du Lac Blades Junior	203	2015/2016 season (100%)	0	203	0
43	USA	Team Fond du Lac Blades Junior	203	2014/2015 season (70%)	0	0	0
44	SWE	Team Seaside Junior	188	2016/2017 season (100%)	0	0	0
44	SWE	Team Seaside Junior	188	2015/2016 season (100%)	0	0	0
44	SWE	Team Seaside Junior	188	2014/2015 season (70%)	0	104	84
45	FRA	Team Cometes Junior	184	2016/2017 season (100%)	0	0	0
45	FRA	Team Cometes Junior	184	2015/2016 season (100%)	0	108	0
45	FRA	Team Cometes Junior	184	2014/2015 season (70%)	0	76	0
46	GBR	Team Solway Stars Juniors	182	2016/2017 season (100%)	0	182	0
46	GBR	Team Solway Stars Juniors	182	2015/2016 season (100%)	0	0	0
46	GBR	Team Solway Stars Juniors	182	2014/2015 season (70%)	0	0	0
47	RUS	Team Idel Junior	175	2016/2017 season (100%)	0	0	0
47	RUS	Team Idel Junior	175	2015/2016 season (100%)	0	0	0
47	RUS	Team Idel Junior	175	2014/2015 season (70%)	0	175	0
48	FRA	Team Black Diam'S Junior	171	2016/2017 season (100%)	0	0	0
48	FRA	Team Black Diam'S Junior	171	2015/2016 season (100%)	0	0	0
48	FRA	Team Black Diam'S Junior	171	2014/2015 season (70%)	87	84	0
49	FRA	Team Chrysalides Junior	164	2016/2017 season (100%)	0	164	0
49	FRA	Team Chrysalides Junior	164	2015/2016 season (100%)	0	0	0
49	FRA	Team Chrysalides Junior	164	2014/2015 season (70%)	0	0	0
50	SWE	Team Rhapsody Junior	161	2016/2017 season (100%)	0	0	0
50	SWE	Team Rhapsody Junior	161	2015/2016 season (100%)	0	0	0
50	SWE	Team Rhapsody Junior	161	2014/2015 season (70%)	0	93	68
51	FIN	Team Ice Infinity Junior	148	2016/2017 season (100%)	0	148	0
51	FIN	Team Ice Infinity Junior	148	2015/2016 season (100%)	0	0	0
51	FIN	Team Ice Infinity Junior	148	2014/2015 season (70%)	0	0	0
52	SUI	Team United Blades Juniors	133	2016/2017 season (100%)	0	0	0
52	SUI	Team United Blades Juniors	133	2015/2016 season (100%)	0	133	0
52	SUI	Team United Blades Juniors	133	2014/2015 season (70%)	0	0	0
53	HUN	Diamond Laces Frostwork Junior	124	2016/2017 season (100%)	0	0	0
53	HUN	Diamond Laces Frostwork Junior	124	2015/2016 season (100%)	124	0	0
53	HUN	Diamond Laces Frostwork Junior	124	2014/2015 season (70%)	0	0	0
53	AUS	Team Majestic Ice Junior	124	2016/2017 season (100%)	124	0	0
53	AUS	Team Majestic Ice Junior	124	2015/2016 season (100%)	0	0	0
53	AUS	Team Majestic Ice Junior	124	2014/2015 season (70%)	0	0	0
55	FIN	Team Estreija Junior	115	2016/2017 season (100%)	0	0	0
55	FIN	Team Estreija Junior	115	2015/2016 season (100%)	0	0	0
55	FIN	Team Estreija Junior	115	2014/2015 season (70%)	0	115	0
56	CHN	Team C-Star Junior	108	2016/2017 season (100%)	0	0	0
56	CHN	Team C-Star Junior	108	2015/2016 season (100%)	0	108	0
56	CHN	Team C-Star Junior	108	2014/2015 season (70%)	0	0	0
57	USA	Team Synchroettes Junior	104	2016/2017 season (100%)	0	0	0
57	USA	Team Synchroettes Junior	104	2015/2016 season (100%)	0	0	0
57	USA	Team Synchroettes Junior	104	2014/2015 season (70%)	0	104	0
58	USA	Team Saint Louis Synergy Junior	93	2016/2017 season (100%)	0	0	0
58	USA	Team Saint Louis Synergy Junior	93	2015/2016 season (100%)	0	0	0
58	USA	Team Saint Louis Synergy Junior	93	2014/2015 season (70%)	0	93	0
59	TUR	Team Golden Roses Junior	90	2016/2017 season (100%)	90	0	0
59	TUR	Team Golden Roses Junior	90	2015/2016 season (100%)	0	0	0
59	TUR	Team Golden Roses Junior	90	2014/2015 season (70%)	0	0	0
59	NED	Team Illuminettes Junior	90	2016/2017 season (100%)	0	0	0
59	NED	Team Illuminettes Junior	90	2015/2016 season (100%)	90	0	0
59	NED	Team Illuminettes Junior	90	2014/2015 season (70%)	0	0	0
61	TUR	Team Anatolia Junior	81	2016/2017 season (100%)	0	0	0
61	TUR	Team Anatolia Junior	81	2015/2016 season (100%)	81	0	0
61	TUR	Team Anatolia Junior	81	2014/2015 season (70%)	0	0	0
62	CZE	Team Orion Junior	68	2016/2017 season (100%)	0	0	0
62	CZE	Team Orion Junior	68	2015/2016 season (100%)	0	0	0
62	CZE	Team Orion Junior	68	2014/2015 season (70%)	0	68	0
63	BEL	Team Temptation Junior	51	2016/2017 season (100%)	0	0	0
63	BEL	Team Temptation Junior	51	2015/2016 season (100%)	0	0	0
63	BEL	Team Temptation Junior	51	2014/2015 season (70%)	51	0	0
64	LAT	Team Amber Junior	46	2016/2017 season (100%)	0	0	0
64	LAT	Team Amber Junior	46	2015/2016 season (100%)	0	0	0
64	LAT	Team Amber Junior	46	2014/2015 season (70%)	46	0	0
65	RSA	Team Rainbow Junior	41	2016/2017 season (100%)	0	0	0
65	RSA	Team Rainbow Junior	41	2015/2016 season (100%)	0	0	0
65	RSA	Team Rainbow Junior	41	2014/2015 season (70%)	41	0	0
66	TUR	Team Turkuaz Junior	37	2016/2017 season (100%)	0	0	0
66	TUR	Team Turkuaz Junior	37	2015/2016 season (100%)	0	0	0
66	TUR	Team Turkuaz Junior	37	2014/2015 season (70%)	37	0	0

== See also ==
- 2016–17 ISU Season's World Ranking
- ISU World Standings
- ISU Season's World Ranking
- 2016–17 figure skating season
- 2016–17 synchronized skating season
