= Out of My Province =

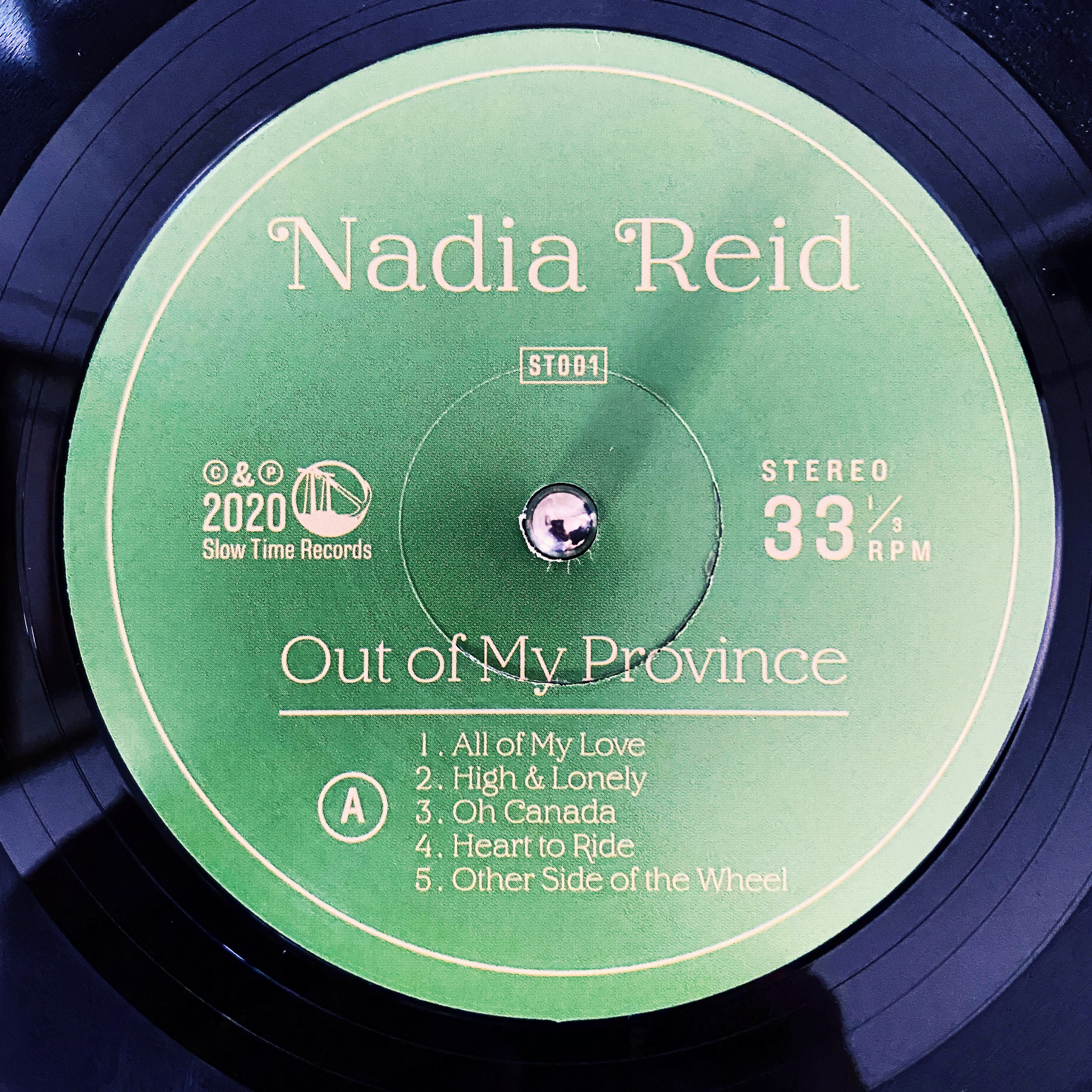

Studio album by Nadia Reid
- Released: 6 March 2020
- Length: 39:47
- Label: Spacebomb Records
- Producers: Trey Pollard; Matthew E. White

Nadia Reid chronology
Preservation (2017)	Out of My Province (2020)	Enter Now Brightness (2025)

Professional ratings
Aggregate scores
Source	Rating
AnyDecentMusic?	7.7/10
Metacritic	83/100
Review scores
Source	Rating
The Line of Best Fit	8/10
Paste	7.8/10
Under the Radar	7.5/10
Uncut	8/10
The Skinny	5/5 stars
The Times	4/5 stars

Out of My Province is the third studio album by New Zealand musician Nadia Reid. It was released on 6 March 2020 under Spacebomb Records.

== Critical reception ==
Out of My Province was met with universal acclaim reviews from critics. At Metacritic, which assigns a weighted average rating out of 100 to reviews from mainstream publications, this release received an average score of 83, based on 8 reviews.

== Track listing ==
Out of My Province track listing
No.	Title	Length
1.	"All of My Love"	4:07
2.	"High & Lonely"	3:40
3.	"Oh Canada"	4:47
4.	"Heart to Ride"	4:09
5.	"Other Side of the Wheel"	4:00
6.	"Best Thing"	4:10
7.	"I Don't Wanna Take Anything From You"	3:56
8.	"The Future"	3:32
9.	"Who Is Protecting Me"	3:27
10.	"Get the Devil Out"	3:59

== Charts ==
Chart performance for Out of My Province
Chart (2020)	Peak position
New Zealand Albums (RMNZ)	2
