= Thinkin Bout You (Frank Ocean song) =

2012 single by Frank Ocean

Single by Frank Ocean

from the album Channel Orange
- Released: April 17, 2012
- Recorded: 2011
- Genre: R&B; soul; chillwave; pop
- Length: 3:21
- Label: Def Jam
- Songwriters: Christopher Breaux; Robert Taylor
- Producer: Frank Ocean • Shea Taylor

Frank Ocean singles chronology
"No Church in the Wild" (2012)	"Thinkin Bout You" (2012)	"Pyramids" (2012)

Music video
- "Thinkin Bout You" on Vimeo

"Thinkin Bout You" is a song by American singer Frank Ocean, released as the lead single from his debut studio album Channel Orange (2012). The song was written by Ocean and Shea Taylor. Originally to be featured on Bridget Kelly's debut album, Ocean released his demo version of the track for free on his Tumblr account in 2011. Kelly released her version of the track, titled as "Thinking About Forever" on her debut EP Every Girl released October 19, 2011. In May 2012, Ocean's version was officially sent to radio and released on iTunes as a single.

Lyrically, the track is about a relationship just out of Ocean's reach and the turmoil that ensues. The track also explores feelings of regret and heartbreak. The song received highly positive reviews from music critics, who praised the atmospheric production, Ocean's falsetto and writing ability. Some critics noted the possible bisexual undertones featured on the track.

In December 2012, the song peaked at number 32 on the Billboard Hot 100, 94 on the UK Singles Chart, and 13 on the Heatseekers Songs chart. In 2011, the song received a music video directed by visual art group High5Collective released on September 15. Ocean appears in the clip which revolves around an inter-dimensional romance with Native American cultural imagery. Ocean performed the track during his seven-show tour through North America and Europe in November 2011, at the April 2012 Coachella Musical Festival, and his supporting tour for Channel Orange. "Thinkin Bout You" has been certified platinum by the Recording Industry Association of America (RIAA) and has sold more than one million units in the United States. The song was nominated for a Grammy Award in 2013 for Record of the Year.

== Background ==
In early 2011, Roc Nation recording artist Bridget Kelly and her production team had approached Frank Ocean to write a song for her debut studio album. The song in question eventually became "Thinking About You", which Kelly commented; “it’s sort of a vulnerable track and I wanted everyone to feel me on it.” On July 28, 2011, Ocean leaked his demo version of the song onto his Tumblr account, with the title stylized as "Thinking Bout You". The song was then promptly taken down by Ocean. Kelly, who had already performed an acoustic version of the song, retitled her version "Thinking About Forever" following the release of Ocean's version. Kelly's version found its way onto her debut EP Every Girl (2011). Kelly was ultimately fine with Ocean's decision, however she noted that she didn't like how most people thought Ocean's version was the original, and how people assumed her version was a cover version. About the confusion of the track, Kelly stated

Now that push has come to shove, we're going to let the song have a life of its own. I think it's an amazing, well-written record. Frank Ocean is incredibly talented, I will never say anything against that. But at the same time, you know, he's going to do what he wants to do, he's an artist as well.

Ocean later stated why he chose to release his own version of the song, stating that it was still extremely personal to him. On March 8, 2012, a re-mastered version of the song premiered on IHeartRadio, intended to be the lead single from Ocean's debut album. At a listening party in June 2012, it was confirmed that the track would appear on Ocean's Channel Orange, which was released on July 17, 2012. The version of the track eventually featured on the album was remodified for a second time, this time to include additional strings and further remastered production. It was released as a digital download on April 17, 2012. The song was subsequently released to mainstream radio in the United States on January 29, 2013.

== Composition ==
"Thinkin Bout You"
"Thinkin Bout You" is a song about the turmoil of a broken relationship.

"Thinkin Bout You" is an R&B song with an atmospheric beat. The track is a tender ballad that "retains Ocean's signature mellow, minimalist vibe," reinforced with shimmering synths and silky production. Ocean croons smoothly on the song, while employing a falsetto vocal range in certain sections. MTV columnist Jenna Hally Rubenstein likens Ocean's singing on "Thinkin Bout You" to Robin Thicke, Justin Timberlake, and Maxwell. The version of the song featured on Channel Orange features an additional string section, opening the track with a swell of strings.

Lyrically, "it's a melancholy record discussing the torturous pain that comes with thinking about someone all the time, even if they may not reciprocate the sentiment." The track, being originally written for a woman, can be viewed as unisex composition. Following Ocean's revelation that he has been attracted to people of the same sex, some critics noted that lines such as "my eyes don't shed tears, but boy they pour when I'm thinkin bout you" had another additional message, expressing his own thoughts on love. The song has been called a forbidden love track, expressing Ocean's turmoil about his own hidden sexuality. The refrain "boy" was originally viewed synonym for "wow", though "new urgency" was pumped into the track, adding extra pathos. Ocean reminisces about his "first time", with an ex-lover who is addressed as "boy" during the song. In the first lines, Ocean apologizes to the subject of the song as he implies he shed tears over them ("A tornado flew around my room before you came / Excuse the mess it made, it usually doesn't rain in Southern California").

About Ocean's writing, Pitchfork Media's Jordan Sargent stated that the "strength of his songwriting is his ability to make the unfamiliar feel intensely personal, as if you're a friend that has long known all the particulars of his relationships." He continued, "Thinking About You" is also more primal, though. The yearning in his falsetto is almost palpable as he flips gender roles and admits that he's been "thinking about forever," while simultaneously questioning if the "girl" even had that kinda thing on her mind." Erika Ramirez of Billboard wrote that the track "gives prominence to his songwriting prowess and sonic versatility, as he intertwines the parallel styles of soul, R&B, jazz and even a bit of funk." The song has been described as incredibly personal in nature, the "sort of thing that's best sung by the person who wrote it." The track telepathically serenades the person who took Ocean's virginity, and in the "motel room of memories Frank talks eternal love, breaking into a sublime Maxwell-esque falsetto that makes a good case for restoring the style to contemporary mainstream R&B."

== Critical reception ==
"Thinkin Bout You" received highly positive reviews from music critics. Pitchfork Media called the song "bewitching" and complimented its crossover potential. Sputnikmusic's Sobhi Youssef praised the track, commenting that Ocean's ability to "emote within the confines of a ballad without making it saccharine or cheesy is nearly unparalleled by any of his contemporaries", citing "Thinkin Bout You" as the framework of most of the album. Pitchfork Media critic Jordan Sargent praised the song, and wrote "this isn't a tale of bedroom triumph; instead it's a beguiling sketch of a relationship just out of his reach. Like many of his songs, the magnetism of "Thinking About You" lies not in the details, but in the lack thereof." Billboard stated that the "Odd Future member tries out different singing styles, showing off his beautiful falsetto vocal range in certain sections." MTV journalist Jenna Hally commented that Ocean had a "surprisingly gorgeous falsetto" and "retains Frank's classic laid-back and relaxed R&B vibe." Katherine Asaph of Popdust wrote that the track "might as well be Ocean’s final audition for R&B stardom" and that it was a "smooth ballad version of "Novacane" without the sleaze getting in the way of its purpose is just about the best thing possible for Ocean’s burgeoning fame. The track shatters no earth, and nobody will use it as a (flawed) example about how Ocean’s changing the R&B game, but in everyone’s career is a time for a solid ballad."

John Calvert of The Quietus described "Thinkin Bout You" as a "slow-release torch song the colour of caramel and bathed in low voltage lighting, a buzzing but soothing synth cycle and muffled beats evoke touching and kissing in a velveteen womb. Poised, considered, classy and moving, this is uniquely Frank Ocean." Greg Kot of the Chicago Tribune stated that the track "couldn’t be any less auspicious as an opening song, little more than a delicate, yearning falsetto vocal over vaporous keyboards and a muffled rhythm track." Rolling Stone writer Jody Rosen described the song as "woozy", featuring Ocean's "falsetto rippling over murmuring electronic percussion". He stated that "it's a bisexual black bohemian New Orleanian-turned-Angeleno's avant-R&B torch ballad. And, of course, it's just a love song – an anthem for anyone, anywhere, who's found love, and lost it."

Hayley Louise Brown of Clash viewed the song as an important part of the album, musing "opening with a reworked version of heartbreaking ballad 'Thinking About You' and an instant confrontation with the full force of Ocean's vocal range, the whole record echoes with extra terrestrial Odd Future synths and clumsy piano chords." Lane Billings of Paste noted the song as whispy in nature, and made a case for Ocean as an R&B revivalist. Consequence of Sound's Harley Brown of stated that the song moves languidly, "like perfect thoughts about someone missed, until the muscle memory of Ocean’s falsetto bursts into the song’s upper register." She continued, "while Ocean might feel this more acutely than either woman who sung those songs, there’s a reason Bey shed a tear the first time she heard it. Regardless of how much these lyrics were influenced by lines like, 'By the time I realized I was in love, it was malignant. It was hopeless,' the ache in Ocean’s voice is universal. MSN Music's Danielle Cheesman felt that Ocean did his followers a service by featuring the song as the album's opener, describing the track as "the year-old spacey serenade to a boy that became a fan favorite." She continued, "despite now being enhanced with a strings intro, his falsetto - more importantly - remains in tact [sic] over the well-known warped ebb and flow."

=== Accolades ===
Rolling Stone named the song the 4th best song of 2012, calling it "the year's deepest love song [that] won us all." In 2021, it was added as the 367th greatest song of all time on their Top 500 Greatest Songs of All Time list.Complex named the track the fourth best song of 2011, writing that "Ocean's voice explores those awkward spaces in a new relationship, making the eternal lover's questions sound new and urgent. Whatever it is, Frank Ocean's 'Thinking About Forever' is one of those songs that will never get old." Beyoncé reportedly cried while listening to the song, and wrote Ocean a poem of support. Knowles and Ocean had previously collaborated on the track "I Miss You" on her 2011 album 4. The Village Voice's Pazz & Jop annual critics' poll ranked "Thinkin Bout You" at number four to find the best music of 2012. In 2019, Pitchfork ranked the song 5th on its list of the 200 Best Songs of the 2010s.

== Music video ==
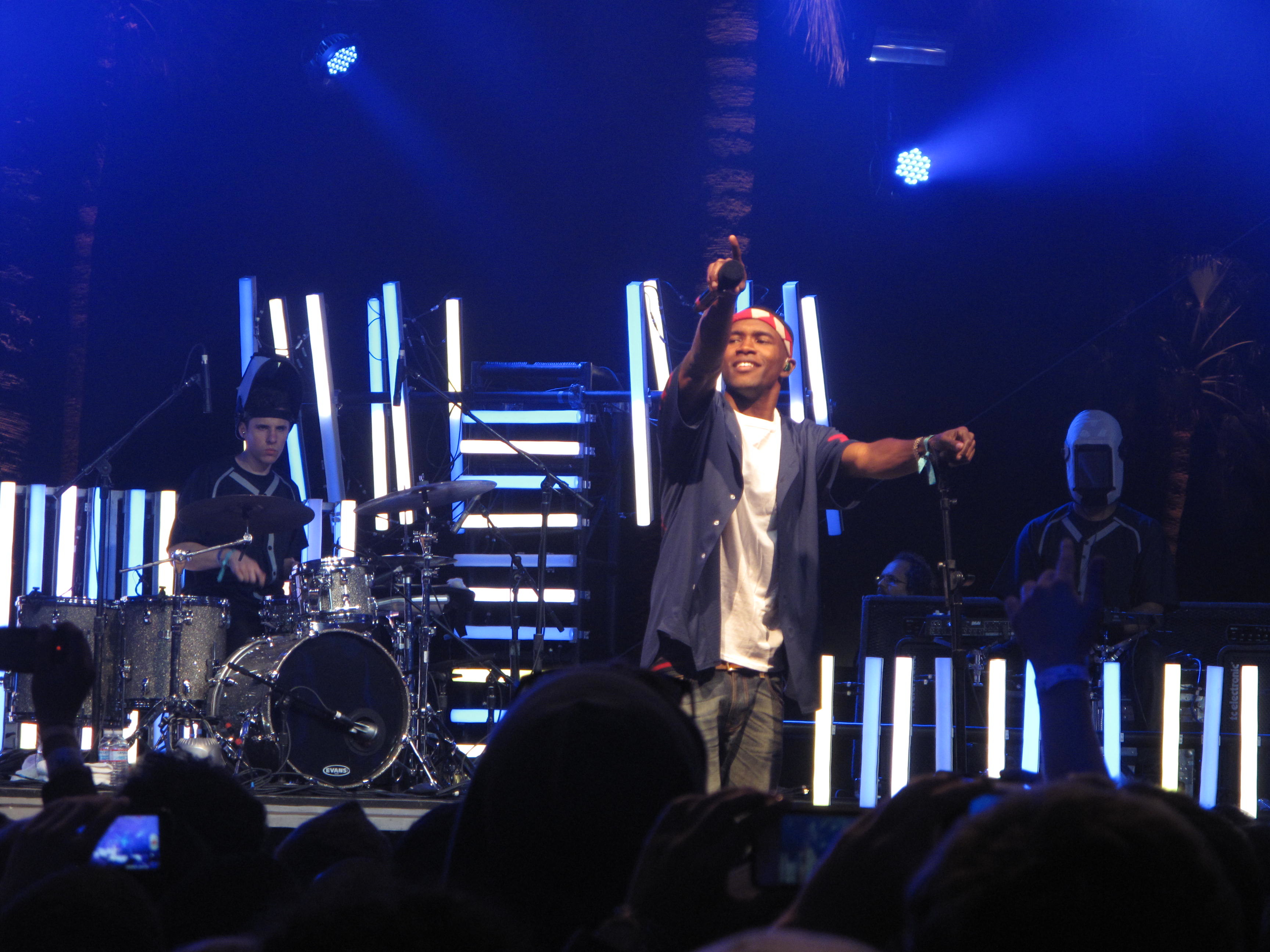
Ocean appears in the music video as a doctor

On September 15, 2011, a music video directed by visual art group High5Collective was released. The direction team's "music videos are typically unofficial affair" but according to them, the clip was the official video. Pitchfork Media reported, "it sure looks official, since Frank seems to appear in the bloody, somewhat tragic clip (in doctor's garb), and Frank posted it on his Tumblr." It featured Native American cultural imagery and interdimensional elements in its plot. The music video plays out "more like a short film than something you’d see on MTV Jams, this visionary piece sees the OFWGKTA crooner play merely a supporting cast role as a doctor. Ocean makes a cameo as a doctor, though "mostly with the back of his head, his footage refreshingly entwined with a girl-saving Native American mystical ritual." The video explores the dreams of a sick girl, a "few primitive zombie-looking people", and some "celestial activity."

The Huffington Post wrote that "the video is a dream within a story involving a little girl, a teepee and a few deaths. Cool! It's a surprisingly filmic effort, with a sepia mid-century creepiness that calls to mind Mad Men plus Justified, with a little Walking Dead thrown in for good measure." The Smoking Section commented, "he premise might sound out there, until you watch for yourself and your assumptions become trumped by the visually and mentally stimulating succession of supernatural events." Prefix Magazine gave the video a positive review, writing "the vid sets Ocean's doe-eyed crooning against something of an inter-dimensional love story, that or a dreamcatcher-inspired fever dream. Either way, pioneer triage and white-eyed shaman were not what we we're expecting, but we couldn't be more pleasantly surprised."

== Promotion ==
Ocean embarked on a solo tour through North America and Europe to promote his 2011 mixtape Nostalgia, Ultra and his other musical projects. The set lists to the various shows varied, though "Thinkin Bout You" was performed at all shows. The track was included during Ocean's setlist at the April 2012 Coachella Musical Festival. Complex magazine stated the "his falsetto on “Thinking About You” made women in the audience swoon." Ocean later performed the song at the 2012 MTV Video Music Awards.

Electronic artist SBTRKT released a remixed version of the track onto his own personal SoundCloud account, announcing "did this whilst on tour...not mixed or official".

== Cover versions ==
Pop artists Justin Bieber and Jaden Smith recorded a cover version of the track. MTV reported, "in his smooth, pop and R&B way Justin fantasizes about Selena Gomez, and delivers Frank's sexy verse like a boss: "Do you not think so far ahead?/'Cause I've been thinking 'bout forever."

American singer ZZ Ward performed a version of the song in April 2013 for The A.V. Club's A.V. Undercover series.

Flo Morrissey and Matthew E. White covered the song on their 2017 record Gentlewoman, Ruby Man.

Flea, better known as bassist of the Red Hot Chili Peppers, included a "Thinkin Bout You" cover on his debut jazz album, Honora (2026). Flea performed the song, playing trumpet solos along with bass, with a full jazz ensamble on The Tonight Show Starring Jimmy Fallon to promote the album ahead of its release in March 2026.

== Chart performance ==
On the week of March 22, 2012, the song debuted at number 91 on Billboard's Hot R&B/Hip-Hop Songs. It has since peaked at number 7. Following the release of Channel Orange, the track rode a wave of momentum and charted at number 32 on the Billboard Hot 100, 6 on the Billboard Heatseekers Songs chart, 94 on the UK Singles Chart and 16 on the UK R&B singles chart. On December 14, 2012, "Thinkin Bout You" was certified gold by the Recording Industry Association of America (RIAA), for shipments of 500,000 units in the United States. As of February 28, 2013, the song has sold over one million copies in the United States.

== Charts ==
=== Weekly charts ===
Chart (2012–13)	Peak position
Denmark (Tracklisten)	33
Japan (Billboard Japan Hot 100)	87
New Zealand (RIANZ)	30
South Korea (Gaon Chart)	88
UK Singles Official Charts Company	94
UK R&B (Official Charts Company)	16
US Billboard Hot 100	32
US Hot R&B/Hip-Hop Songs (Billboard)	7

=== Year-end charts ===
Chart (2012)	Position
US Hot R&B/Hip-Hop Songs (Billboard)	46
US On-Demand Songs (Billboard)	36

Chart (2013)	Position
US Hot R&B/Hip-Hop Songs (Billboard)	37

== Certifications ==
Region	Certification	Certified units/sales
Australia (ARIA)	5× Platinum	350,000^{‡}
Brazil (Pro-Música Brasil)	Gold	30,000^{‡}
Canada (Music Canada)	Gold	40,000^{*}
Denmark (IFPI Danmark)	3× Platinum	270,000^{‡}
New Zealand (RMNZ)	6× Platinum	180,000^{‡}
Spain (Promusicae)	Gold	30,000^{‡}
United Kingdom (BPI)	2× Platinum	1,200,000^{‡}
United States (RIAA)	Platinum	1,000,000^{‡}
Streaming
Denmark (IFPI Danmark)	Platinum	1,800,000^{†}
^{*} Sales figures based on certification alone.^{‡} Sales+streaming figures based on certification alone.^{†} Streaming-only figures based on certification alone.

== Release history ==
Release dates and formats for "Thinkin Bout You"
Region	Date	Format	Label(s)	Ref.
United States	January 29, 2013	Mainstream airplay	Island	

== See also ==
- Bad Religion (Frank Ocean song)
- Forrest Gump (song)
- LGBTQ representation in hip-hop
