= The Future and the Past =

Studio album by Natalie Prass
- Released: June 1, 2018
- Studio: Spacebomb Studios
- Length: 45:27
- Label: ATO
- Producer: Matthew E. White; Natalie Prass

Natalie Prass chronology
Natalie Prass (2015)	The Future and the Past (2018)

Singles from The Future and the Past
- 1. "Short Court Style" Released: February 26, 2018; 2. "Sisters" Released: March 28, 2018; 3. "Lost" Released: May 1, 2018

Professional ratings
Aggregate scores
Source	Rating
AnyDecentMusic?	7.8/10
Metacritic	82/100
Review scores
Source	Rating
AllMusic	4/5 stars
Consequence of Sound	B+
The Guardian	4/5 stars
The Independent	4/5 stars
The Irish Times	4/5 stars
Mojo	4/5 stars
NME	3/5 stars
Pitchfork	7.7/10
Q	4/5 stars
Rolling Stone	3.5/5 stars
Uncut	8/10

The Future and the Past is the second studio album by American singer-songwriter Natalie Prass. It was released in June 2018 under ATO Records.

== Production ==
Natalie Prass revealed on May 1, 2017, the she had finished writing her second studio album, with the help of singer-songwriter and producer Matthew E. White. The album was recorded at Spacebomb Studios.

== Release ==
On February 26, 2018, Prass announced the release of her second studio album, along with the first single "Short Court Style". Olivia Horn of Pitchfork described the single as "the song’s texture is laid down by a deep-set bass groove, twinkly disco synth, and sampled “woo!”s that puncture every break. Prass rides a wave of ecstatic vocal harmonies in and out of the chorus, where she sings plainly about a love that conquers all." On March 22, 2018, Prass performed the single on Conan.

The second single "Sisters" was released on March 28, 2018.

On May 1, 2018, the third single "Lost" was released. Prass explained the single is about "putting your foot down in a relationship when enough is enough. It's the journey of getting engulfed in another person's energy, good and bad, and ultimately understanding the other person is out to hurt you and not there to love you back."

== Critical reception ==
The Future and the Past was met with "universal acclaim" reviews from critics. At Metacritic, which assigns a weighted average rating out of 100 to reviews from mainstream publications, this release received an average score of 82 based on 20 reviews. Aggregator Album of the Year gave the release an 80 out of 100 based on a critical consensus of 22 reviews.

=== Accolades ===
Accolades for The Future and the Past
Publication	Accolade	Rank
American Songwriter	Top 25 Albums of 2018	24
Consequence of Sound	Top 25 Albums of 2018 – Mid-Year	20
The Guardian	Top 50 Albums of 2018	15
MusicOMH	Top 50 Albums of 2018	36
NME	Top 100 Albums of 2018	99
No Ripcord	Top 50 Albums of 2018	35
PopMatters	Top 70 Albums of 2018	59
The Skinny	Top 50 Albums of 2018	28
Under the Radar	Top 100 Albums of 2018	15

== Track listing ==
Track listing adapted from Tidal.

No.	Title	Music	Length
1.	"Oh My"	Natalie Prass; Matthew E. White	3:15
2.	"Short Court Style"	N. Prass; Kyle Ryan	3:43
3.	"Your Fire (Interlude)"	N. Prass; Trey Pollard	0:32
4.	"The Fire"	N. Prass; Mikky Ekko	3:27
5.	"Hot for the Mountain"	N. Prass; M. White	4:31
6.	"Lost"	N. Prass; Adj Buffone; Amy Wadge	3:10
7.	"Sisters"	N. Prass; M. White	4:36
8.	"Never Too Late"	N. Prass; Dillon O'Brian; Steve Lindsey	3:49
9.	"Ship Go Down"	N. Prass; M. White	6:03
10.	"Nothing to Say"	N. Prass; K. Ryan; Peter Barbee	4:26
11.	"Far from You"	N. Prass; Fiona Bevan	3:33
12.	"Ain't Nobody"	N. Prass; M. White	4:22
Total length:			45:27

Japanese edition bonus track
No.	Title	Length
13.	"Lost" (Demo)	3:14
Total length:		48:58

== Charts ==
Chart (2018)	Peak position
Belgian Albums (Ultratop Flanders)	157
Scottish Albums (OCC)	50
UK Independent Albums (OCC)	9
US Heatseekers Albums (Billboard)	10
US Independent Albums (Billboard)	29

== Release history ==
Region	Date	Format	Edition	Label
Various	1 June 2019	CD; LP; digital download	Standard	ATO
Japan	1 June 2019	CD	Japanese	ATO; Hostess
