= Natalie Prass (album) =

Studio album by Natalie Prass
- Released: January 27, 2015
- Recorded: 2012
- Genre: Indie pop; chamber pop; baroque pop; pop soul
- Length: 39:06
- Label: Spacebomb Records; Startime International; Caroline International
- Producer: Matthew E. White; Trey Pollard

Natalie Prass chronology
Natalie Prass (2015)	The Future and the Past (2018)

Singles from Natalie Prass
- 1. "Bird of Prey" Released: July 22, 2014

Natalie Prass is the debut studio album by Natalie Prass. It was co-produced by Matthew E. White and Trey Pollard.

== Composition, recording, and production ==
Prass began writing songs for her self-titled as early as 2009. In January 2012, Prass began to record with Matthew E. White, her childhood friend and founder of Spacebomb Records, in his studio attic in Richmond, Virginia. White provided the horn arrangements and Trey Pollard provided the string arrangements. Since the budget for the album was “virtually nonexistent,” White utilized the help of his friends from the Virginia Commonwealth University jazz program to record the strings. By February 2012, recording for the album was complete but the release was delayed due to Spacebomb's inaugural release of Big Inner.

== Music videos ==
The first music video for the album, "Why Don't You Believe In Me", was released on February 4, 2015. The music video, which was co-directed by Erica Prince and Tiona McClodden, features Prass "cutting up the features of her face and rearranging them in increasingly bizarre patterns".

A second music video from the album, "Bird of Prey", was released on June 15, 2015. The music video was directed by Malia James, bassist for the Dum Dum Girls.

== Reception ==
Professional ratings
Aggregate scores
Source	Rating
AnyDecentMusic?	8.3/10
Metacritic	86/100
Review scores
Source	Rating
AllMusic	4/5 stars
The A.V. Club	B+
The Guardian	5/5 stars
The Independent	4/5 stars
The Irish Times	4/5 stars
Mojo	4/5 stars
The Observer	4/5 stars
Pitchfork	8.3/10
Q	4/5 stars
Uncut	8/10

=== Accolades ===
Publication	Accolade	Year	Rank
The Guardian	The Best Albums of 2015	2015	28
Paste	The 50 Best Albums of 2015	2015	7
Pitchfork	The 50 Best Albums of 2015	2015	49
Rough Trade	Albums of the Year 2015	2015	22
Stereogum	The 50 Best Albums of 2015	2015	26

== Track listing ==
No.	Title	Length
1.	"My Baby Don't Understand Me"	5:12
2.	"Bird of Prey"	5:22
3.	"Your Fool"	3:16
4.	"Christy"	3:52
5.	"Why Don't You Believe in Me"	3:54
6.	"Violently"	5:46
7.	"Never Over You"	3:59
8.	"Reprise"	3:44
9.	"It Is You"	4:01

== Charts ==
Chart (2015)	Peak position
Belgian Albums (Ultratop Flanders)	114
Dutch Albums (Album Top 100)	96
UK Albums (OCC)	50
US Americana/Folk Albums (Billboard)	11
US Heatseekers Albums (Billboard)	6
US Top Rock Albums (Billboard)	46
