= Fight the Big Bull =

- Origin: Richmond, Virginia
- Genres: Jazz
- Years active: 2000s–present
- Labels: Spacebomb Records
- Members: Matthew E. White

Fight the Big Bull is a Richmond, Virginia based improvisatory ensemble with two 2010 recordings selected for NPR's best of the year lists.

== History ==
The band was founded in the mid-2000s (decade) by guitarist Matthew E. White, one of the organizers of the Patchwork Collective, an arts group dedicated to creating a vital local music scene. The original configuration- called simply Fight the Bull- was a trio with drummer Pinson Chanselle and trombonist Bryan Hooten. The group was subsequently expanded to eight players (or nine, with the occasional addition of ex-Agents of Good Roots percussionist Brian Jones.) The band has collaborated with Chicago saxophonist Ken Vandermark and NYC-based slide trumpeter and composer Steven Bernstein (the latter captured on the 2010 recording "All is Gladness in the Kingdom"). They also collaborated with alternative folk singer David Karsten Daniels, with White providing arrangement to his critically well-received 2010 Thoreau project "I Mean to Live Here Still". A performance with Daniels at the NYC club La Poisson Rouge was reviewed by The New York Times .

In 2011 White formed Spacebomb Records, featuring members of Fight the Big Bull backing musicians including Washington-based indie folk-rocker Karl Blau and NYC jazz bass clarinetist Jason Stein. The label's first release, Matthew E. White's "Big Inner" received international critical acclaim, including positive reviews in the NY Times and selection as "Artist of the Month" by Rolling Stone.

White and Fight the Big Bull also provided the music for Duke University's 2011 tribute to Alan Lomax's "Sound of the South" field recordings in a concert featuring the band backing Bon Iver's Justin Vernon, Sharon Van Etten and members of Megafaun.

== Members ==
- Matthew E. White – Guitar
- Cameron Ralston – Bass
- Pinson Chanselle – Drums
- Bryan Hooten – Trombone
- Reggie Pace – Trombone
- John Lilley – Saxophone
- Jason Scott – Saxophone
- Bob Miller – Trumpet
- Brian Jones – Percussion
