= Bishop Luffa School =

Location
- Westgate; Chichester, West Sussex, PO19 3HP; England; 50.8400°N 0.7976°W

Information
- Type: Secondary academy
- Motto: Always our best because everyone matters
- Religious affiliation: Church of England
- Established: 1963
- Department for Education URN: 140472 Tables
- Ofsted: Reports
- Chair of Directors: Nigel Hoggarth
- Head teacher: Austen Hindman
- Staff: 90 teaching, 40 support
- Gender: co-educational
- Age: 11 to 18
- Enrolment: 1,517
- Houses: Andrewes, Burrows, King, Otter, Ridgeway, Sherbourne, Story, Wilson (all named after bishops)
- Colours: Burgundy / Maroon and gold
- Website: http://www.bishopluffa.org.uk/

Bishop Luffa School, named after a former Bishop of Chichester, Ralph de Luffa, is a co-educational Church of England secondary school located in Chichester, West Sussex, England. The number of enrolled pupils was around 1,650 in 2020, in eight 'Year' house-forms and the sixth form. The school, formerly a 'Technology College', is now a 'CofE Teaching School', holding Leading Edge status, with national Artsmark and Sportsmark also having been awarded. From its foundation to 2013 the school was a Voluntary Aided establishment, on 1 December 2013 the school successfully converted to Academy status.

== Campus ==
The school has a campus of 7.2 hectares including the main school building, external sports hall, a multi-use games area (MUGA), and two large grass sport fields. Other facilities include a stage, library and the sixth form centre.

== Sixth form ==
There is an integral sixth form at Bishop Luffa for students who wish to continue their education after the age of sixteen, with an annual intake of around 230. Although 200 existing pupils are given priority, twenty pupils from other schools are also accepted each year for entry in Year 12. A wide range of subjects can be studied, including Business Studies, Computing, Law and Economics. The school also offers the new AQA Baccalaureate 'Bacc' hybrid qualification, including a 100-hour self-directed Extended Project Qualification.

A2 level pass rates at Bishop Luffa are above the national average. In 2017, for co-educational State schools in West Sussex, Bishop Luffa pupils achieved the 3rd highest average individual point scores (11th overall).

== Academic performance ==
The school's admission policy is non-academically selective. In 2017, amongst co-educational State Secondaries, the school was rated the highest in West Sussex (4th overall) against the new 'Attainment 8' Key GCSE subject scores per pupil, including English, Maths, Sciences and Humanities. The (October 2008 and November/December 2022) Ofsted reports rated the school as uniformly "outstanding" across all metrics.

In 2008 the school was praised by the Anglican schools inspectorate for its Christian religious character and met minimum standards.

== Houses ==
Years 7–13 are split into 8 house groups, each named after former Bishops of Chichester. The house Andrewes was previously Bell, changed in 2016 after sexual abuse allegations made against Bell, albeit subsequently rehabilitated. The full list of houses are: Andrews, Burrows, King, Otter, Ridgeway, Sherborne, Story and Wilson.

== Notable former pupils ==
- Jonathan Ansell (born 1982), musician
- Jess Breach (born 1997), England Women's Rugby Team
- Charlotte Hawkins (born 1975), television and radio presenter
- Rupert Holliday-Evans, actor
- Cara Horgan (born 1984), actress
- Baroness Helena Morrissey DBE (born 1966), financier
- Alex Preston (born 1979), novelist and journalist
- Samuel Preston (born 1982), singer
- Stuart Matthew Price (born 1983), singer, composer, and theatrical producer
- Linus Roache (born 1964), actor
- Joel Ward (born 1989), footballer
- Rupert Wingfield-Hayes (born 1967), BBC foreign correspondent
