= Nadia Reid =

Singer-songwriter

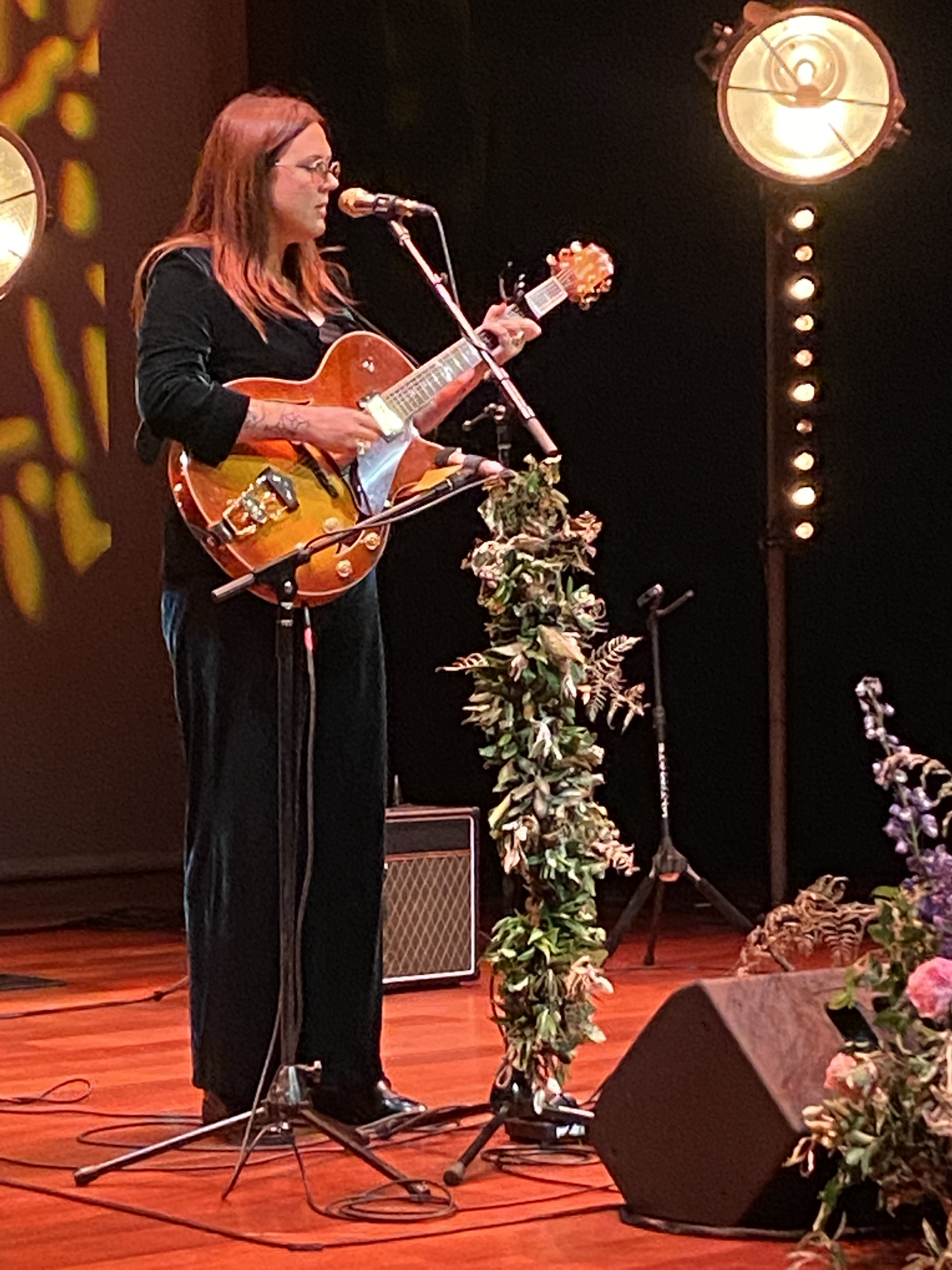
- Nadia Reid in Christchurch, NZ

Background information
- Born: Nadia Reid-O'Reilly; 23 August 1991 (age 35); Dunedin, New Zealand
- Origin: Port Chalmers, New Zealand
- Genres: Folk, new folk
- Occupations: Musician, singer-songwriter
- Instruments: Vocals, guitar
- Years active: 2015–present
- Labels: Chrysalis Records, Spacebomb, Spunk!, Basin Rock
- Website: www.nadiareid.com

Nadia Reid (born 23 August 1991) is a singer-songwriter and guitarist from Port Chalmers, New Zealand. She has released four albums and toured internationally.

== Early life ==
Reid was born in 1991 in Port Chalmers, Dunedin, New Zealand. She is the daughter of Karin Reid and Craig O'Reilly. She was educated at Logan Park High School and Queen's High School in Dunedin.

She began playing the guitar aged 14, winning the best female musician award in New Zealand's national youth music event Smokefreerockquest. In 2009, she was a member of the Queen's madrigal choir which won the New Zealand Choral Federation Millennium Trophy (Otago) for secondary school choirs.

== Career ==
At the age of 18, Reid moved to Christchurch. She released several EPs and began performing original songs. As opportunities to perform nationally became available, she moved to Auckland and later to Wellington.

Reid performs live with a band of musicians, including Sam Taylor (guitar), Richie Pickard (bass), and Joe McCallum (drums).

She has been acclaimed for her "intimate musical soundscape" and "unique voice". The Guardian described her as "an understated, wise guide through uncertain territory". Revue said she was "allegorical and often brutally honest".

Her three albums, Listen to Formation, Look for the Signs (2015), Preservation (2017), and Out of My Province (2020), received acclaim internationally. Reid's fourth record, Enter Now Brightness was released in February 2025.

=== 2014–2016: Crowdfunding and release of debut album ===
Reid had connections to Lyttelton-based producer Ben Edwards and was encouraged to make her first full-length album. Lacking startup capital, she set up a PledgeMe campaign which was given a significant boost after she opened a show for Tiny Ruins. She recorded Listen to Formation, Look for the Signs (2015) at Edwards' Sitting Rooms Studios.

In early 2015, Reid was signed to Australian indie label Spunk Records and Listen to Formation, Look for the Signs was released officially in Australia and New Zealand. It was warmly received by critics, and in 2016 was nominated for a Tui award for best folk album, and for the 2016 Taite Music Prize. After living and playing shows in Australia, Reid returned home to Port Chalmers and began an English Degree at the University of Otago.

Listen to Formation, Look for the Signs was licensed for UK, US and European release, and supported by Reid's first tour of the UK and Europe in 2016.

=== 2017–present: World tours and second album ===
Before touring, Reid returned to the Lyttleton studio with Ben Edwards and her backing band and recorded her sophomore album Preservation.

The tour was a success, and while in London, Reid was approached with a co-management offer with Melodic Records. This was followed by a publishing deal with Basin Rock Records and an endorsement from Crafter Guitars. Preservation was released in March 2017 and was given a positive reception. It was one of eight finalists for the 2018 Taite Music Prize.

Reid opened for Ryan Adams at his Auckland show on 20 May 2017, and Sharon van Etten at Auckland's Civic Theatre on 12 December 2022.

== Awards ==
In 2017, Reid's first single from Preservation, "Richard", gained a nomination for the APRA Silver Scroll award, regarded as New Zealand's most important songwriting award. Judges described the song as "a stand-out folk-rock gem with its wonderfully direct delivery, charting heartbreak and dissolution, through striking imagery".

Also in 2017, producer Ben Edwards won a New Zealand Music Award for his work on Preservation, and Reid was nominated for Best Solo Artist, Breakthrough Artist of the Year and Best Alternative Artist.

== Film and television appearances ==
On 26 September 2017, Reid made her UK television debut appearance with her band on Later... with Jools Holland on BBC Two.

== Discography ==
=== Studio albums ===
List of studio albums with selected chart positions and certifications
Title	Album details	Peak chart positions
Title	Album details	NZ
Listen to Formation, Look for the Signs	Released: 27 March 2015; Label: Spunk Records; Format: CD, LP, download	— (Note: Listen to Formation, Look for the Signs did not enter the NZ Top 40 Albums Chart, but peaked at number 12 on the NZ Artists Albums Chart.)
Preservation	Released: 3 March 2017; Label: Basin Rock/Spunk!; Format: CD, LP, download	13
Out of My Province	Released: 6 March 2020; Label: Spacebomb/Slow Time; Format: CD, LP, download	2
Enter Now Brightness	Released: 7 February 2025; Label: Chrysalis/Slow Time; Format: CD, LP, download	17
"—" denotes releases that did not chart.

=== Extended plays ===
Title	Details
Letters I Wrote and Never Sent	Released: 27 October 2011; Label: Self-published; Formats: digital download

=== Singles ===
List of singles, showing year released and album name
Title	Year	Peak chart positions	Album
Title	Year	NZ Artist Hot	Album
"Call the Days"	2015	—	Listen to Formation, Look for the Signs
"The Arrow and the Aim"	2016	—	Preservation
"Richard"	2017	—	Preservation
"Best Thing"	2019	—	Out of My Province
"Get the Devil Out"	2020	13	Out of My Province
"Oh Canada"	2020	16	Out of My Province
"—" denotes releases that did not chart.

=== Other charted songs ===
List of songs, with selected chart positions, showing year released and album name
Title	Year	Peak chart positions		Album
Title	Year	NZ Arist Heat.	NZ Artist Hot	Album
"Preservation"	2017	1	—	Preservation
"Right on Time"	2017	3	—	Preservation
"Heart to Ride"	2020	—	9	Out of My Province
"All of My Love"	2020	—	10	Out of My Province
"High & Lonely"	2020	—	15	Out of My Province
"—" denotes releases that did not chart.
