= David Karsten Daniels =

American singer-songwriter

- David Karsten Daniels in Chapel Hill, North Carolina (2007)

Background information
- Origin: Lubbock, Texas, United States
- Genres: Indie rock Indie folk Americana; Indie pop
- Occupation: Musician
- Instruments: Guitar, Bass, Drums, Keyboards, Violin, Cello, Programming
- Years active: 2000–present
- Labels: Fat Cat Records, Bu_hanan, Carpi Records
- Website: davidkarstendaniels.tumblr.com

David Karsten Daniels is an American singer-songwriter with an affinity for "slow-creeping songs that, once at full power, are like nothing else". His recordings are typically combinations of many styles of music sitting underneath lyrics that explore topics such as life & death, family dynamics, religion, neuroscience, the nature of change and the natural world.

== Early life ==
Daniels was born in Lubbock, Texas. His formative years were spent in Montgomery, Alabama, singing in school and church choirs, and studying the piano and guitar. Daniels spent two years in the American Boychoir School, an all boy's boarding school in Princeton, New Jersey where he was exposed to college level music theory and ear training. He played in jazz ensembles throughout high school in Montgomery, Alabama and Dallas, Texas. In college, David majored in music composition and played double bass in the symphony orchestra. A course in Free Improvisation taught by trombonist/improviser/lecturer Kim Corbett would prove to be major turning point in David's approach to composition.

== Career ==
While obtaining his bachelor's degree from Southern Methodist University, through which he studied in Paris, France, as well as in Texas, David worked on the recordings that would become his first two albums, The Mayflower and Out From Under Ligne 4. Following graduation in 2001, David moved briefly to Portland, Oregon where he began work on the recordings that would become his third album, Angles. in 2002, David moved to Chapel Hill, North Carolina. There, the Bu hanan Collective was formed by David and longtime friends and bandmates Daniel Hart and Alex Lazara. In 2006, David was signed by Fat Cat Records of Brighton, England, and released his fourth album, Sharp Teeth as a co-release between Fat Cat and Bu hanan. He followed that with Fear of Flying in 2008, a meditation on death and the afterlife. His next LP, "I Mean to Live Here Still," (2010) is a song cycle using the texts of Henry David Thoreau, with Daniels' music and singing accompanied by Fight the Big Bull, a nonet from Richmond, VA led by Matthew E. White. That album, characterized by The Line of Best Fit as "brave and beautiful [...], marrying the North American folk vernacular with interesting free-jazz textures and atmospheres" was called one of the "5 Best Genre Defying Albums of 2010" by NPR. In 2014, Daniels created the score for S. Cagney Gentry's feature film Harvest. David released his first largely instrumental album The Four Immeasurable Minds in 2015. In 2016 he released 2 records, The Teacher a lo-fi full length heavily dependent on field recordings as well as his 9th studio album Kaleidoscope, an EP released May 19, 2016. A Single, Rules for Rules is out November 2019.

David has toured with Frightened Rabbit, Mice Parade, Tom Brosseau, Nina Nastasia, and Arboretum, and played shows with Animal Collective, Vashti Bunyan, Okkervil River, the Bowerbirds, the Mountain Goats, Low Barlow, Vetiver, David Bazan, Roman Candle, Richard Buckner, St. Vincent, Cass McCombs, Shearwater, Castanets, the Twilight Sad, DeYarmond Edison, and Retribution Gospel Choir.

== Discography ==
Album	Year	Label
The Mayflower L.P.	2000	Bu_hanan
Out From Under Ligne 4 L.P.	2001	Bu_hanan
Angles L.P.	2004,05	Bu_hanan
Sharp Teeth L.P.	2007	Fat Cat / Bu_hanan
Fear Of Flying L.P.	2008	Fat Cat
I Mean To Live Here Still L.P.	2010	Fat Cat
The Four Immeasurable Minds L.P.	2014	smll thngs / Carpi Records
The Teacher L.P.	2016	smll thngs
Kaleidoscope E.P.	2016	smll thngs
Oneness SINGLE	2016	smll thngs
Rules for Rulers SINGLE	2019	smll thngs
Don't Turn Me On SINGLE	2020	smll thngs
Sad Girls SINGLE	2020	smll thngs
Looks Like Rain SINGLE	2020	smll thngs
Everyday, Everday SINGLE	2020	smll thngs
Pictures of Pluto E.P.	2022	smll thngs
Cloud Car SINGLE	2023	smll thngs
All the Molecules SINGLE	2023	smll thngs
You and I SINGLE	2025	smll thngs

== Collaborations ==
In 2008, Fat Cat asked Daniels to do additional recording and remix Frightened Rabbit's It's Christmas So We'll Stop.

In 2011, Daniels contributed a remix to Our Brother the Native's Rhythm Hymns.

In 2014, Daniels contributed string and horn arrangements to Penny and Sparrow's Struggle Pretty.

== Sharp Teeth Musicians ==
David Karsten Daniels - Organ, Guitar (Acoustic), Bass, Piano, Cello, Drums, Glockenspiel, Guitar (Electric), Tambourine, Vocals
Aimee Argote - Vocals
Aaron Bratcher - Trombone (Bass), Trombone (Tenor)
Dane Daniels - Drums, Tambourine, Vocals
Daniel Hart - Violin, Viola
Eric Haugen - Guitar (Electric)
Alex Lazara - Organ, Synthesizer, Piano, Vocals, Engineer, Mellotron, Fender Rhodes
Sara Morris - Organ, Cello, Vocals
Zac Petersen - Trumpet
Tim Phillips - Trumpet
John Ribo - Guitar (Electric), Vocals
Jason Sayers - Trombone (Tenor)
Joshua Snyder - Drums
Mara Thomas - Vocals
Erin Wright - Vocals
Perry Wright - Tambourine, Vocals
Joseph P. Zoller - Sax (Alto), Sax (Tenor)

== Fear of Flying Musicians ==
David Karsten Daniels - Bass, Guitar, Percussion, Drums, Keyboards, Programming, Vocals, Engineer, Mixing
Daniel Hart - Violin
Sara Morris - Vocals
John Ribo - Vocals
Wendy Spitzer - Oboe
Dylan Thurston - Drums
Perry Wright - Vocals, Handclaps

== I Mean To Live Here Still Musicians ==
David Karsten Daniels - vocals, acoustic guitar
Bob Miller - trumpet, piccolo trumpet
Jason Scott - clarinet, flute, saxophone
John Lilley - saxophone, clarinet
Reggie Pace - trombone, tuba, claps
Bryan Hooten - trombone
Cameron Ralston - upright bass
Matthew E. White - horn arrangements, electric guitar
Pinson Chanselle - drums
Brian Jones - percussion
Gabe Churray - synthesizer
Alex Lazara - organ, mellotron
Trey Pollard - pedal steel
Eddie Prendergast - electric bass
Toby Whitaker - trombone
Perry Wright - bass voice

== The Four Immeasurable Minds Musicians ==
David Karsten Daniels - Guitar (Electric), Recorder, Keyboards, Vocals
K. - Vocals

== Kaleidoscope Musicians ==
David Karsten Daniels - vocals, guitar, bass, percussion, drums, keys, programming, violin
Chris Walker - drums, percussion, guitar, drums, keys, programming, violin, vocals
Dane Daniels - drums, percussion, vocals
Abbey Daniels - vocals, bass
Kyle Henson - drums, percussion, vocals
Ben Jousan - guitar, vocals
Lex Land - vocals
-topic - vocals
K8 - vocals
K. - vocals
Dashon Moore-Guidry - additional percussion
Juan Lopez - handclaps, vocals
Aaron Carpenter - handclaps

== The Teacher Musicians ==
David Karsten Daniels -vocals, guitar, bass, percussion, drums, keys, programming,
K. - Vocals

Daniel Hunt. - Drums

K8 - Vocals

Tara Toms - Vocals

== Pictures of Pluto Musicians ==
David Karsten Daniels - Guitar (Electric)

== Works in radio, film and TV ==
- David Karsten Daniels' track "That Knot Unties?" appears on season one, episode nine of SHOWTIME's United States of Tara and in the closing credits of the film DeadGirl.
- David Karsten Daniels composed the scores for S. Cagney Gentry's feature film Harvest and the documentary film El Paracaidista (2022).
- David Karsten Daniel's track Jesus and the Devil appears in This American Life Episode 340 – "The Devil in Me"
- David Karsten Daniels' track "The Funeral Bell" appears in the short film Wait for Laugh.
