= Forrest Gump (song) =

2012 song by Frank Ocean

Song by Frank Ocean

from the album Channel Orange
- Released: July 10, 2012
- Genre: Soul
- Length: 3:15
- Label: Def Jam
- Songwriters: Christopher Breaux; James Ho
- Producers: Frank Ocean; Malay; Om'Mas Keith

"Forrest Gump" is a song by American singer-songwriter Frank Ocean from his debut studio album Channel Orange. It is a soul ballad that evokes Motown sound and Stevie Wonder, and features Ocean singing about his desire for another man who in the lyrics is under the pseudonym of the titular character of the film Forrest Gump. Ocean performed the song to close the 55th Annual Grammy Awards.

== Background and composition ==
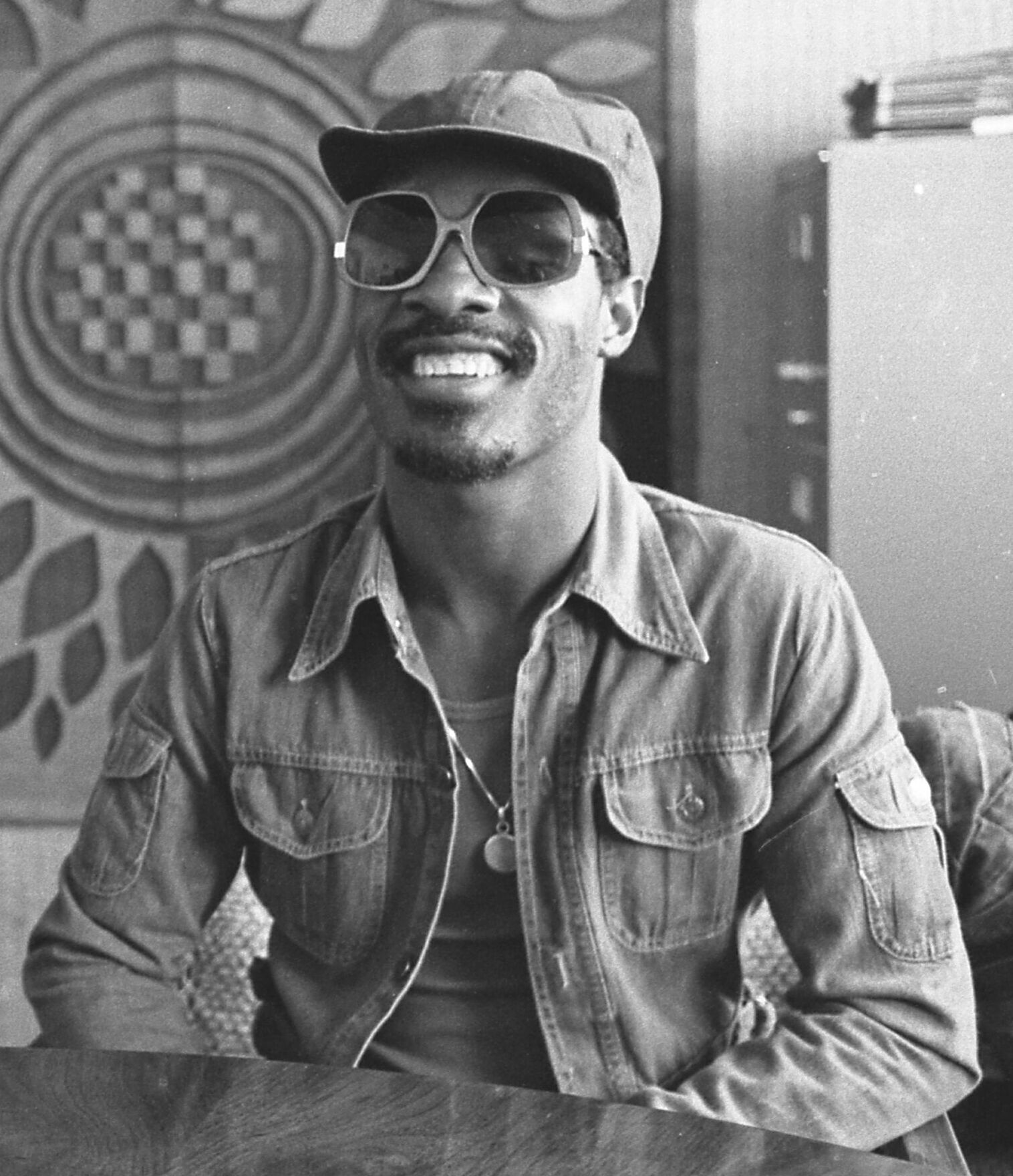
The choruses of Ocean's "Forrest Gump" and "Sweet Life" are reminiscent of Stevie Wonder.

Listening sessions for Ocean's album Channel Orange took place in early July of 2012, with the lyrics drawing speculation around his sexual orientation from early reviewers. A BBC journalist stated, "On the songs ‘Bad Religion,’ ‘Pink Matter and ‘Forrest Gump,’ you can hear him sing about being in love and there are quite obvious words used like ‘him’ and not ‘her.’" To address the speculation, Ocean posted an open letter on Tumblr, writing that his first love was a man who he had confessed his feelings to, but the man would not admit he reciprocated Ocean's feelings until years later. Ocean said that he wanted to sing about his experience in the album.

"Forrest Gump" is a "Motown-esque love-ballad" with homoerotic lyrics where Ocean sings about his desire for a man while using the titular character from the film of the same name as a pseudonym for his love interest. Randall Roberts of the Los Angeles Times described the song as "a tortured ode to Ocean's unrequited love for another man." Ocean sings from the perspective of Forrest Gump's love interest in the film, Jenny, but flips the narrative so it is Jenny who is "consumed by a crush." Noting that Jenny in the film smokes while Forrest hates the smell of cigarettes, Austin Williams of Vibe wrote that "it can be assumed he’s playing a male version of Jenny, his smoking feels more reflective, as it’s paired with a longing for someone he can’t stop thinking about." The instrumentation consists of "languid Southern soul guitar", a church organ, and a Roland TR-808 beat, while Ocean's "tender vocal" is contrasted with a "ghostly backdrop of echoing voices". The chorus evokes Motown sound and Stevie Wonder. While having a sexual aspect, its reference to lips and fingertips subverts their depiction in most love songs: "My fingertips and my lips / They burn from the cigarettes / Forrest Gump / You run my mind, boy / Running on my mind, boy". Hua Hsu, writing for Slate, stated that the track was "disarmingly upbeat" even though it read like an addendum to Ocean's Tumblr letter.

Rebecca Nicholson in The Guardian wrote that lyrics such as "You're so buff and so strong, I'm nervous ... You run my mind, boy" seem "astonishingly subversive", emphasizing the rarity of "overtly same-sex songs" in any genre. Asked by Nicholson about his reason for not using the generic pronoun "you", Ocean answered:

When you write a song like Forrest Gump, the subject can't be androgynous. It requires an unnecessary amount of effort. I don't fear anybody... at all. So, to answer your question, yes, I could have easily changed the words. But for what? I just feel like it's just another time now. I have no interest in contributing to that, especially with my art. It's the one thing that I know will outlive me and outlive my feelings. It will outlive my depressive seasons.

"You run my mind, boy" references Forrest's running in the film, and at the same time expresses Ocean's infatuation. In the first verse, Ocean contrasts Forrest's gentleness with his "intimidating strength and stature": "I know you, Forrest / I know you wouldn’t hurt a beetle / But you’re so buff and so strong / I’m nervous, Forrest". Williams wrote that these "effectively convey the feeling of loving someone who could cripple you with their rejection." The lines referring to having seen Forrest's game are direct ties to the film, with Ocean quoting the scene where Forrest "literally runs past the end zone and into the locker room." While the film does not depict anyone special attending one of Forrest's football games, Ocean writes from the point of view of "a swooning admirer there to support his man." Ocean ends the song with "Forrest green, Forrest blues / I’m remembering you / If this is love, I know it’s true / I won’t forget you", calling back to the end of the film where Forrest asks Jenny to marry him. Jenny seems reluctant in agreeing, and a defeated Forrest leaves. Later, after 45 seconds pass in the runtime, the film shows Jenny entering Forrest's room and confessing she reciprocates his feelings. Williams wrote that Ocean's final verse reimagines those 45 seconds where Jenny's rejection seems to be established as "something far less excruciating." Ocean whistles in the track's coda.

The song is in A major, and has a chord progression of D-A-Dm-A. Ocean's vocal spans from E_{4}-F♯_{5}.

== Critical reception ==
Chris Richards of The Washington Post described the track as "one of the most vulnerable and plain-spoken confessionals on 'Channel Orange.'" Alexis Petridis of The Guardian called it a "gorgeous closer." Billboard wrote, "When removed from the heaviness of the album around it, the lightweight 'Gump' is simple fun with a killer melody — but, alas, doesn’t quite fit with the rest of Ocean’s heartfelt compositions here." The Denver Post stated that Ocean is "at his most descriptive in the track": "Detailing the moments of going past third base, the tale of sweet love and affection is relatable and authentic." Colin Carman of The Gay & Lesbian Review Worldwide wrote that "Forrest Gump" was "as smooth as it is subversive".

== Live performances ==
In April 2012, Ocean performed the song on his Coachella set, three months before the album's release.

=== Grammy Awards ===
In Ocean's Grammy Awards performance of the track, Ocean's legs are hidden beneath a screen that shows footage homaging the film Forrest Gump, while his look consisting of a striped headband and yellow blazer homages The Royal Tenenbaums.

On February 7, 2013, having received six Grammy Award nominations, Ocean told The New York Times that he would only perform at the 55th Annual Grammy Awards if the Recording Academy allowed him to play the song he wanted to. Three days later, Ocean closed the awards ceremony with "Forrest Gump", wearing a striped headband and a yellow blazer. The retro look drew comparisons to the character Ritchie Tenenbaum in Wes Anderson's film The Royal Tenenbaums. Ocean stood in front of a large screen, while Ocean's legs were concealed behind a smaller LED screen that displayed footage of legs running in a homage to the film Forrest Gump. Ocean wanted to imitate the Forrest Gump scene where Forrest runs in an open road and a mob follows him. The video shown on the screens was directed by Hiro Murai. Ocean's performance had "pitch problems"; Ocean stated that he could not hear his keyboard because of problems with his in-ear monitors. Billboard called the performance "courageous", NBC News described it as "one of the most memorable performances of the night", and USA Today stated that Ocean "proved he's a keeper" with his performance. On the other hand, Chris Richards of The Washington Post described it as "wobbly" and stated that Ocean "failed to eclipse the quiet intensity he summons so easily in the studio." Kyle Anderson of Entertainment Weekly wrote that the decision to perform "Forrest Gump" was "inexplicable", and that his performance "left a lot to be desired." He further stated, "'Forrest Gump' isn't anybody's favorite song from Channel Orange. Heck, based on his performance, it didn't seem like Ocean was particularly fond of it either." He graded the performance B, stating the song "might've been a bold choice, but it wasn't necessarily a smart one."

== Credits ==
Credits are adapted from the American Society of Composers, Authors and Publishers (ASCAP) and Tidal.

- Christopher Breaux, James Ho – songwriting
- Frank Ocean, Malay, Om'Mas Keith – production
- Crimson Tide cheerleaders – additional vocals

=== Personnel ===
- Frank Ocean, Malay – mixing engineer
- Adam Harr – recording
- Jeff Ellis, Malay, Pat Thrall – recording engineer
- Adam Harr – second engineer

== Certifications ==
Certifications for "Forrest Gump"
Region	Certification	Certified units/sales
Australia (ARIA)	Platinum	70,000^{‡}
Denmark (IFPI Danmark)	Platinum	90,000^{‡}
New Zealand (RMNZ)	Platinum	30,000^{‡}
United Kingdom (BPI)	Silver	200,000^{‡}
^{‡} Sales+streaming figures based on certification alone.

== See also ==
- Thinkin Bout You (Frank Ocean song)
- Bad Religion (Frank Ocean song)
- LGBTQ representation in hip-hop
- List of songs based on a film
