= Bad Religion (Frank Ocean song) =

2012 song by Frank Ocean

Song by Frank Ocean

from the album Channel Orange
- Released: July 10, 2012
- Genre: Soul; baroque pop
- Length: 2:55
- Label: Def Jam
- Songwriters: Christopher Breaux; Monte Neuble; Charlie Gambetta; Kevin Risto; Waynne Nugent
- Producers: Frank Ocean; Malay; Om'Mas Keith

"Bad Religion" is a song by American singer-songwriter Frank Ocean from his 2012 debut studio album Channel Orange. It is a soul ballad with characteristics of baroque pop and gospel. Ocean sings about his unrequited love for a male friend over a church organ, comparing it to a "one-man cult". Critics received the song positively, with most describing it as a standout in its respective album. Ocean performed the song with The Roots on Late Night with Jimmy Fallon for his television debut, and his performance received acclaim. In 2026, Rolling Stone included "Bad Religion" in their list of 35 Essential LGBTQ Pride Songs.

== Background and composition ==
"This next song I'm going to play, I guess it's pretty important to me because of some of the things I've said in the last month. I'm just kind of taking some freedom for myself, you know?”

— Frank Ocean on Lollapalooza, August 2012.

In early July 2012, listening sessions for Ocean's Channel Orange album before its release led to speculation around his sexual orientation. A BBC journalist stated that on some songs, pronouns such as "him" were used instead of "her", while a blogger described some songs as seemingly having been drawn from a love story of two men. Wanting to address the speculation, on July 4, Ocean came out by posting an open letter on Tumblr, in which he stated that his first love was a man, and that when Ocean confessed his feelings, the man would not admit he reciprocated them until years later. One of the songs that drew the speculation mentioned was "Bad Religion".

"Bad Religion" is a ballad in the style of baroque pop and gospel that runs under three minutes, a "deconstructed gospel confessional" that repurposes the "battle between religion and lust that's been at the heart of soul music since it ceded from gospel". The song is in E major, and Ocean's vocal spans from D_{4} to E_{6}. Accompanied by instrumentation consisting of strings, handclaps, marching band snare drums, and a church organ, Ocean sings about his unrequited love for another man, the "doomed romance" mentioned in his letter. The track uses a four-chord progression, E-G♯m/D♯−C♯m−A. Music historian David Metzer described it as the same one used in Adele's similarly confessional ballad "Someone Like You", but in a different key. Metzer stated that the chords, the key, and the lyrics' confessional aspect suggest an inspiration from "Runaway" by Kanye West, who Ocean had collaborated with previously. In "Runaway", a high register piano plays a descending melody similar to the chords' bass lines in Ocean's and Adele's songs. He wrote that Ocean drew from West's combination of "descending melodic line and self revelation", but used it distinctly. Like Baroque opera composers, Ocean placed the descending melody in the bass to serve as "an underpinning of sorrow", and like Adele on "Someone Like You", Ocean "turns the repeating descending line into a prod for confession."

Lyrically, it centers on Frank Ocean recounting his heartbreak to a taxi driver, a "taxicab confessional". The taxi driver appears to barely speak English, and "across cultural, religious and lingual distances", Ocean "grasps at commonality". "Drawn out church organ chords" set the tone for the song. "Taxi driver, be my shrink for an hour / Leave the meter running…just outrun the demons, could you?" Ocean asks, to which the driver tells him "Allahu Akbar", which Ocean first views as a curse, but later a blessing as he realizes the driver's empathy. In the chorus, Ocean confesses that his male friend will never love him. Ocean evokes religion and displays suicidal thoughts, as he compares his unrequited love for a man to a "one-man cult", and references Jim Jones' Peoples Temple Cult and the 1978 Jonestown mass suicide with the line "cyanide in my styrofoam cup". Metzer wrote, "In his cult, Ocean is both the crazed leader and the passive, doomed follower. He is trapped in his own bad religion." With the pain from Ocean's realization of his friend's inability to love him back, Ocean switches to a vulnerable falsetto before the next verse, repeating "love" in a note that clashes with the repeating chords, revealing his isolation from the music and the world around him. In the second verse, where handclaps appear and become more frequent and intense throughout, Ocean tells the driver his distrust of people as a closeted person in a society that views desire for the same sex as illicit and heretical: "Taxi driver / I swear I’ve got three lives / Balanced on my head like steak knives / I can’t tell you the truth about my disguise / I can’t trust no one..." The following chorus sees Ocean rejecting the earlier falsetto, instead singing with a "more robust" tenor. The intensifying rhythm now includes drums, with "strong hits on the downbeats." He repeats "love me", and lets out a "Stevie Wonder-esque" wail. The outro features the same four repeating chords but in ascending order and played on the electric piano instead of the organ. Metzer viewed this as Ocean seemingly having "pulled himself together", with the continued repetition indicating that his confession will continue outside the taxi cab: "Confessions create rings. Once a secret is divulged, there is always one more person to tell and one more thing to reveal. The rings extend beyond Ocean’s and Adele’s songs and out into their albums."

In 2016, Out Magazine described Ocean singing about male love interests in Channel Orange as "a profound act in a genre still stifled by homophobia."

== Recording ==
To compensate for the few string players available to work on the track's "ominous strings", engineer Jeff Ellis organized the seating for a large string section in EastWest's Studio 1, and captured the sound using a pair of old stereo ribbon microphones. The players placed themselves in different seats each time they played along with the track so the final mix would give the impression of a larger ensemble.

== Critical reception ==
Critics received the track positively, with most describing it as a standout song in Channel Orange. Lindsay Zoladz of Pitchfork called the track the "most arresting song he's ever sung", stating that "everybody-- gay, straight or none of the above-- has had a night that sounds like this. If it doesn't bring you to your knees, check your pulse." Writing for Stereogum, Tom Breihan described the song as the "finest moment" of Channel Orange, "a devastatingly still and personal song, one that renders personal uncertainty as something so specific that it feels universal." Lane Billings of Paste Magazine wrote that "Bad Religion" is the "dramatic centerpiece" of Channel Orange, "a stunning and bare ballad that, for the first time since opener 'Thinkin About You,' places the listener right in the center of Frank Ocean’s pain." Jody Rosen of Rolling Stone called the song the album's "shuddering centerpiece". Billboard described "Bad Religion" as "the most electric, naked, unmistakably affecting song he has ever made" and an "instant classic". Helena Fitzgerald of Vice called it "the standout track in an album full of stand-outs". Jeff Himmelman in The New York Times wrote that the track was the "one undeniable masterpiece on the album". Chris Richards of The Washington Post called it the album's "most breathtaking moment".

In 2026, Rolling Stone included "Bad Religion" in their list of 35 Essential LGBTQ Pride Songs.

== Live performances ==
On July 10, 2012, Ocean performed the song in his television performance debut on Late Night with Jimmy Fallon with The Roots. Described as an "intimate rendition", Ocean sang with "lush notes and obvious soul" and received "raving applause". Ocean's television debut performance received "rave reviews". Los Angeles Times called the performance "riveting" and described it as having "a stripped-down, emotionally raw quality", while a critic from Gawker said "Tonight a star was born definitively." Otis Hart of NPR, having watched as an audience member in the studio, wrote: "Ocean owned those three/four/five minutes (frankly, I lost track of time watching him) and it wasn't until he lowered the mic and turned toward the ensemble that I thought to give them a moment's notice." A month later on August 5, Ocean performed the song on Lollapalooza.

In April 2023, Ocean performed a reworked version of the track in his Coachella set.

== Usage in media ==
"Bad Religion" was featured in the fifth episode of the series Lovecraft Country in the sex scene between the characters Montrose and Sammy. Joelle Monique of The A.V. Club described its usage for Montrose's first sex scene as inspired, while Tirhakah Love of Level Man described its usage as hamfisted while criticizing the series' handling of Black queerness.

== Credits ==
Credits are adapted from the American Society of Composers, Authors and Publishers (ASCAP) and Tidal.

- Christopher Breaux, Monte Neuble, Charlie Gambetta, Kevin Risto, Waynne Nugent – songwriting
- Frank Ocean, Malay, Om'Mas Keith – production
- Dave Eggar – cello
- Matt Chamberlain – drum kit
- Chuck Palmer – strings

=== Personnel ===
- Matty Green – mixing
- Frank Ocean, Malay – mixing engineer
- Mark 'Spike' Stent – additional mixing engineer
- Chad Carlisle – recording
- Jeff Ellis, Malay – recording engineer
- Chad Carlisle, Matty Green – second engineer

== Certifications ==
Certifications for "Bad Religion"
Region	Certification	Certified units/sales
Australia (ARIA)	Gold	35,000^{‡}
Denmark (IFPI Danmark)	Gold	45,000^{‡}
United Kingdom (BPI)	Silver	200,000^{‡}
^{‡} Sales+streaming figures based on certification alone.

== See also ==
- Thinkin Bout You (Frank Ocean song)
- Forrest Gump (song)
- LGBTQ representation in hip-hop
- Religion and LGBTQ people
- Jim Jones in popular culture
