= Rupert Wingfield-Hayes =

British journalist

- Born: Rupert Anthony Wingfield-Hayes; 1967 (age 58–59); London, England
- Education: Bishop Luffa School
- Alma mater: University of Hull (BA); School of Oriental and African Studies, University of London (MA); National Taiwan Normal University
- Occupation: Journalist
- Relatives: Eric Hayes (great-uncle)

Rupert Anthony Wingfield-Hayes (born 1967) is a British journalist and formerly the BBC's Asia Correspondent based in Taipei. He was previously the BBC's Tokyo correspondent for ten years after postings as correspondent in Beijing, Moscow and the Middle East.

== Early life ==
Wingfield-Hayes was born in London in 1967. He was educated firstly at Nower Lodge School, whilst living in Dorking, Surrey and then later at Bishop Luffa School, a comprehensive school in Chichester, England. He studied South East Asian Studies at the University of Hull (BA) and Chinese Politics and International Relations at the School of Oriental and African Studies, University of London (MA). He spent two years studying Chinese at National Taiwan Normal University in Taipei, where he met his Japanese wife. He is the great-nephew of Major-General Eric Hayes.

== Career ==
Wingfield-Hayes has worked for the BBC since 1999. He was the BBC Beijing correspondent from 2000 to 2006. In 2007 he moved to be the BBC Moscow correspondent. In 2010 he was appointed the BBC Middle East correspondent based in Jerusalem. During his time in the Middle East he covered the revolution in Tunisia, the fall of Hosni Mubarak in Egypt and the Libyan civil war.

During the Tahrir Square protests he was detained in Cairo, by the secret police. He was the first BBC correspondent to enter Tripoli after the fall of Muammar Gaddafi. The convoy he was travelling in was ambushed by pro-Gaddafi militia during the fighting in Tripoli. He also covered the Bahraini uprising.

In October 2012, the BBC announced the appointment of Rupert Wingfield-Hayes as its Tokyo correspondent. Wingfield-Hayes was based in the Tokyo bureau from 2012 - 2022, reporting across the BBC's news services, including the BBC's international news channel, BBC World News, in addition to news services within the UK.

In November 2013, Wingfield-Hayes was one of the first foreign journalists reporting from Tacloban, Philippines, after it was struck by Typhoon Haiyan.

In May 2016, Wingfield-Hayes was detained in North Korea and eventually ejected because officials believed he had been disrespectful in his description of the North Korean leader Kim Jong-un. Wingfield-Hayes, his cameraman and producer were arrested and questioned for eight hours before being sent to the airport for a flight to Beijing. The BBC were in Pyongyang to report on the visit of three Nobel laureates and were part of their delegation which took place ahead of the 7th Congress of the Workers' Party of Korea. Experts described Wingfield-Hayes as "extremely lucky" to be released quickly and merely expelled from the country, as they are certain that the only person who could have approved his release was Kim Jong-un himself.
