= Helena Morrissey, Baroness Morrissey =

British financier and campaigner

The Right Honourable The Baroness Morrissey DBE
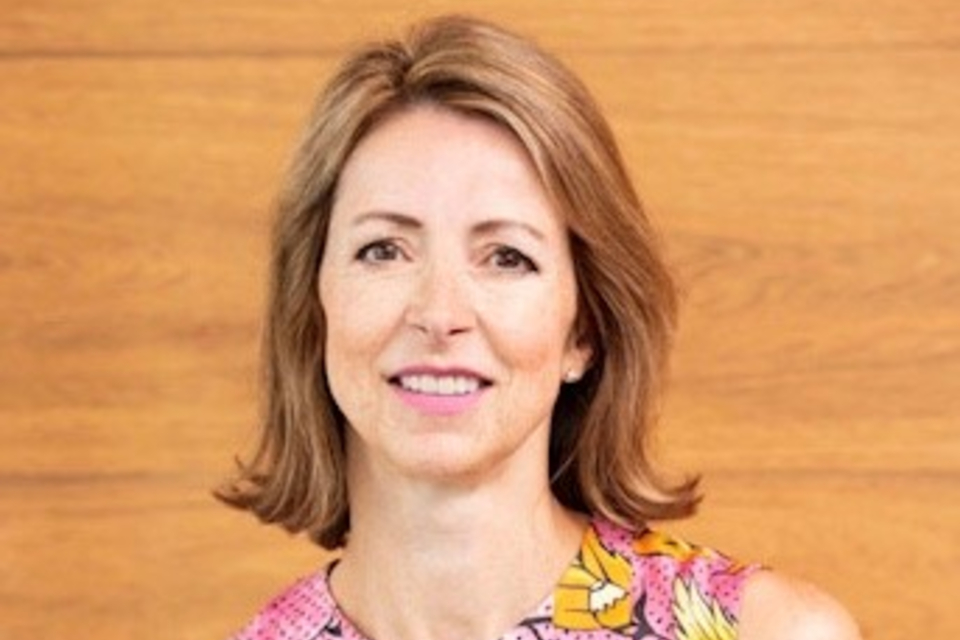

Member of the House of Lords
- Lord Temporal
- Life peerage 3 September 2020

Personal details
- Born: Helena Louise Atkins; 22 March 1966 (age 60) Bowdon, Cheshire, England
- Party: Conservative
- Spouse: Richard Morrissey (m. 1990)
- Children: 9, including Flo Morrissey
- Education: Bishop Luffa School
- Alma mater: Fitzwilliam College, Cambridge
- Occupation: Banker

Helena Louise Morrissey, Baroness Morrissey, DBE (née Atkins; 22 March 1966), is a British financier, campaigner and Conservative peer.

== Early life ==
Morrissey was born in Bowdon, Cheshire, in 1966. She grew up in Alverstoke near Portsmouth, and was educated at Bishop Luffa School. Both of her parents were teachers. She studied philosophy at Fitzwilliam College, Cambridge.

== Career ==
Morrissey began her career at the New York and London bond desks at Schroders. Finding her career path blocked there, she moved to Newton Investment Management in the early 1990s as a fixed income fund manager. Morrissey became Newton's chief executive; as of 2015, it manages £47 billion of assets. Morrissey left Newton Investment Management in 2016. She has been on the board of Legal & General Investment Management and St James's Place.

In July 2021, Morrissey joined the board of AJ Bell, before becoming chair in January 2022. Morrissey announced in September 2022 that she was resigning as chair of the Board.

In June 2022 it was reported Morrissey resigned as director at the Foreign Commonwealth and Development Office, a paid role to provide "strategic leadership" and "advice on performance and delivery". She agreed to leave having been told by Liz Truss, then foreign secretary, her position was untenable following criticism of then Prime Minister Boris Johnson for what Morrissey perceived as a lack of genuine contrition following the "Partygate" scandal.

All Perspectives Ltd, the company behind the GB News television and radio news channel, gained the Baroness as a director in November 2022.

Morrissey chairs the boards of Fidelis Insurance Holdings, Altum Group, and Barnett Waddingham.

== Campaigns ==
In 2010, Morrissey established the 30% Club to campaign for greater female representation on company boards. She is a trustee at Lady Garden Foundation, which raises money for gynaecological cancers, and she is a former chairperson of the corporate board of the Royal Academy of Arts.

== Honours ==
In 2016, Morrissey was awarded an honorary doctorate by the University of Cambridge.

Morrissey was appointed Commander of the Order of the British Empire (CBE) in the 2012 New Year Honours for services to UK business and promoted Dame Commander of the Order of the British Empire (DBE) in the 2017 Birthday Honours for services to diversity in financial services.

On 3 September 2020, she was created Baroness Morrissey, of Chapel Green in the Royal County of Berkshire. She sits in the House of Lords as a Conservative. On 28 September 2020, she made her maiden speech in the Lords.

== Personal life ==
Baroness Morrissey and her husband, Richard, a former financial journalist and stay-at-home dad, are the parents of nine children :

1. Professor Dr Fitzroy Morrissey, an academic at Pembroke College, University of Oxford.
2. Flo Morrissey (born 25 December 1994) married and divorced British singer-songwriter Benjamin Clementine and had issue:
  1. Julian Jupiter Richard Sainte-Clémentine born on Christmas Day, 2017.
  2. Helena Clementine born on 29 October 2019
3. Tuppy Morrissey, who attended Eton College.
4. Millie Morrissey, who works in finance.
5. Clara Morrissey
6. Octavia Morrissey
7. Theo Morrissey
8. Cecily Morrissey
9. Bea Morrissey

They met whilst studying at Cambridge and live in Notting Hill, London.

== Other activities ==
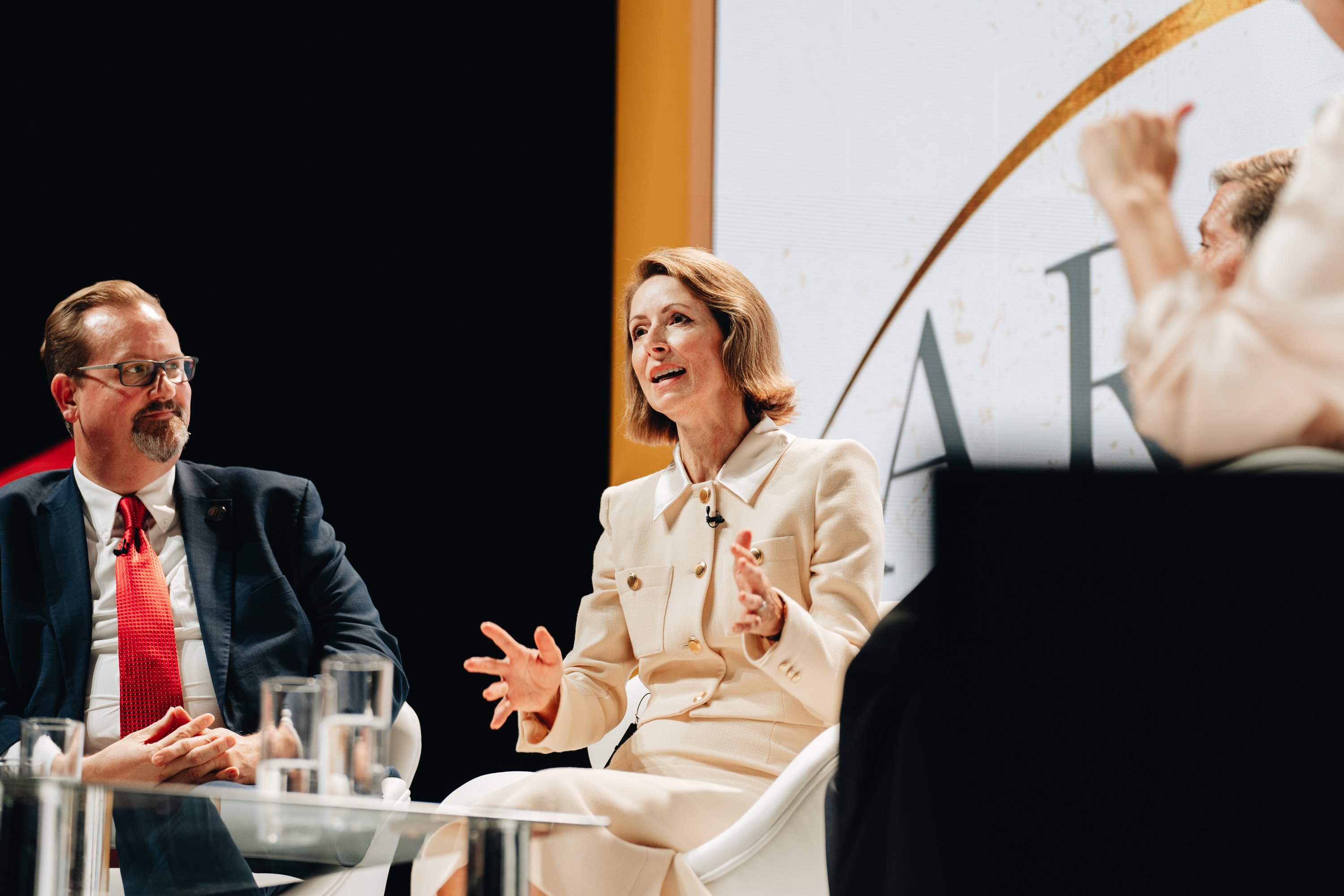
Helena Morrissey speaks on panel discussion with Derek Kreifels at ARC Forum 2023

Morrissey is the author of a book, A Good Time to be a Girl (HarperCollins, 2018). She was the guest on the BBC Radio 4 programme Desert Island Discs on Sunday 22 March 2020.

Morrissey was criticised in 2021 after she tweeted that there was no current pandemic, and "CCP fake videos started this".

In October 2021 her second book, Style and Substance, a Career Guide for Women who want to Win at Work, was published by Little, Brown Books. She gives presentation advice and is known for wearing bold colours. She spoke on the topic of free markets at the Alliance for Responsible Citizenship in October 2023, arguing for the importance of individual character and virtue, over environmental, social, and corporate governance.
