= Enter Now Brightness =

Studio album by Nadia Reid
- Released: 7 February 2025
- Length: 40:21
- Label: Chrysalis Records

Nadia Reid chronology
Out of My Province (2020)	Enter Now Brightness (2025)

Enter Now Brightness is the fourth studio album by New Zealand musician Nadia Reid. It was released on 7 February 2025, by Chrysalis Records, and Reid's own label Slow Time Records.

== Critical reception ==
Professional ratings
Aggregate scores
Source	Rating
Metacritic	74/100
Review scores
Source	Rating
AllMusic	3.5/5 stars
Mojo	4/5 stars
MusicOMH	4/5 stars
Under the Radar	7.5/10
Uncut	8/10
Rolling Stone AU/NZ	4/5 stars

Enter Now Brightness was met with "generally favorable" reviews from critics. At Metacritic, which assigns a weighted average rating out of 100 to reviews from mainstream publications, this release received an average score of 74, based on 7 reviews.

At Under the Radar, writer Mark Moody gave the album a seven and a half out of ten, noting "Reid’s honeyed vocals are a generational gift." Marcy Donelson of AllMusic said "Enter Now Brightness is not only a title but a philosophy on an elegant set of songs that find Reid adapting just fine, thanks, at least with the help of treasured loved ones and music itself."

== Track listing ==
Enter Now Brightness track listing
No.	Title	Length
1.	"Emmanuelle"	3:33
2.	"Cry on Cue"	3:37
3.	"Baby Bright"	3:52
4.	"Hold It Up"	4:07
5.	"Changed Unchained"	3:44
6.	"Second Nature"	3:33
7.	"Even Now"	4:14
8.	"Hotel Santa Cruz"	3:26
9.	"Woman Apart"	5:07
10.	"Send It Down the Line"	5:08

== Charts ==
Chart performance for Enter Now Brightness
Chart (2025)	Peak position
New Zealand Albums (RMNZ)	17
