= Natalie Prass =

American singer-songwriter (born 1986)

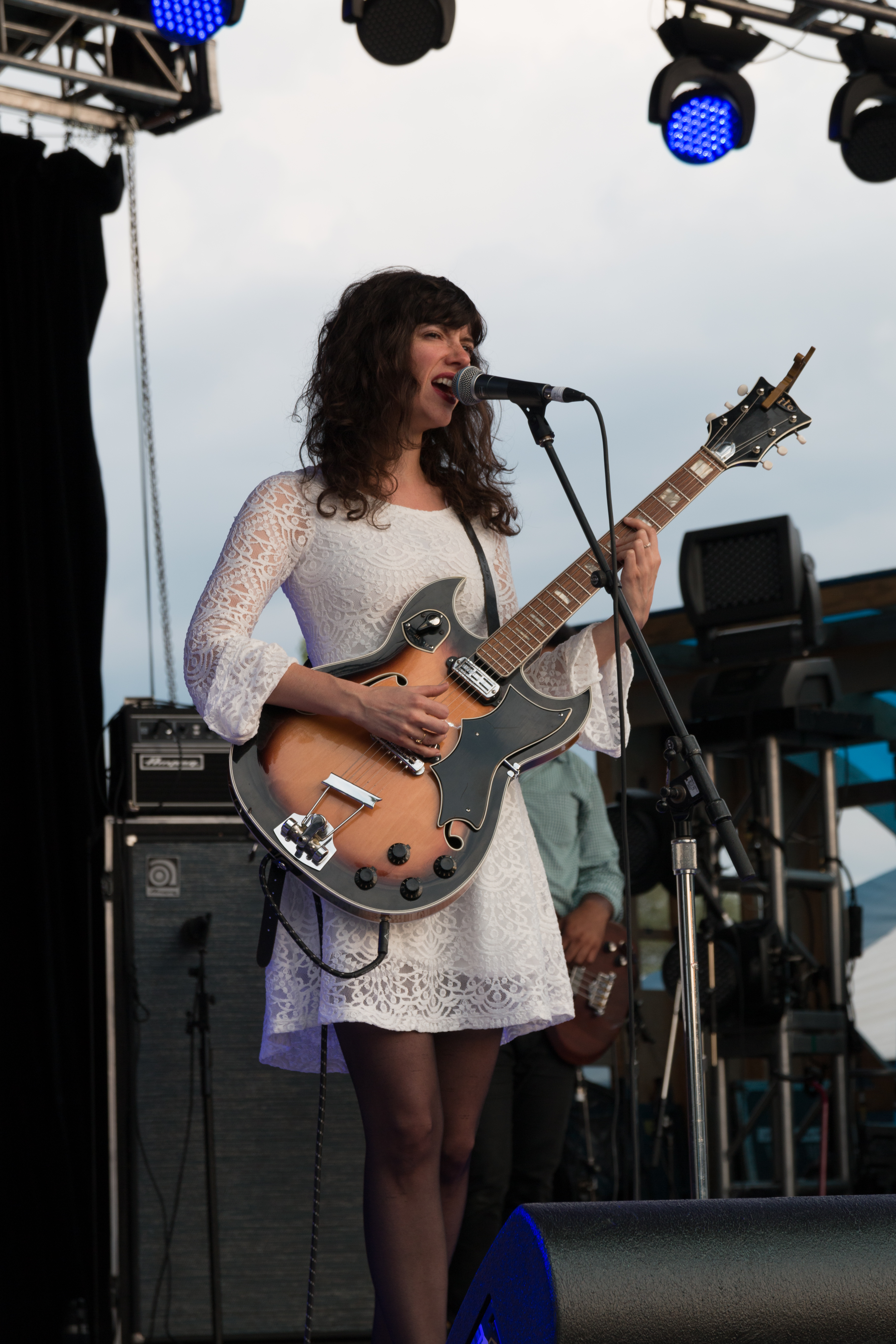
- Prass performing at the 2015 Hillside Festival

Background information
- Born: Natalie Jean Prass; March 15, 1986 (age 40); Cleveland, Ohio, U.S.
- Origin: Virginia Beach, Virginia
- Occupation: Singer-songwriter
- Instruments: Vocals, keyboards, piano, guitar, tambourine
- Labels: Startime International, Spacebomb Records
- Website: natalieprass.com

Natalie Jean Prass (born March 15, 1986) is an American singer-songwriter from Virginia Beach, Virginia. Her self-titled debut album was released on January 27, 2015, through Spacebomb and Columbia Records.

== Biography ==
Natalie Prass was born in Cleveland, Ohio. She lived in Los Angeles for a short time before moving to Virginia Beach when she was around three or four years old. She began writing songs when she was in the first grade, and formed a band with Matthew E. White in the eighth grade. She attended Frank W Cox High School and The Governor's School for the Arts. After high school, she went to Berklee College of Music for a year before transferring to Middle Tennessee State University in 2006. There she enrolled in a songwriting program. She released an EP, Small & Sweet, in 2009 and a second EP, Sense of Transcendence, in 2011. After auditioning with a video demo recorded on her iPhone, she started her career as a keyboardist for Jenny Lewis’ touring band.

On January 27, 2015, Prass released her eponymous debut album on Spacebomb and Columbia Records. It was recognized as one of the Best New Albums by music review website Pitchfork. The album was produced by Matthew E. White and Trey Pollard at Spacebomb Records in Richmond, Virginia.

Natalie appeared on the British music television show, Later... with Jools Holland, Episode 324 airing on Palladia, April 17, 2015.

On October 23, 2015, Prass announced a new EP, Side by Side, set to be released on November 20. It features two live tracks from her self-titled LP and three live covers.

On February 26, 2018, Prass released the single, "Short Court Style". Her second album The Future and the Past was released on June 1, 2018. In July 2018, she was announced as one of the supporting acts on Kacey Musgraves' "Oh, What a World Tour".

== Discography ==
=== Studio albums ===
List of studio albums, with selected details
Title	Album details	Peak chart positions								
Title	Album details	US Heat.	US Folk	US Ind.	US Rock	BEL (FL)	NLD	SCO	UK	UK Indie
Natalie Prass	Released: January 27, 2015; Label: Spacebomb; Format: CD, digital download, LP, streaming	6	11	—	46	114	96	74	50	—
The Future and the Past	Released: June 1, 2018; Label: ATO; Format: CD, digital download, LP, streaming	10	—	29	—	157	—	50	118	9
"—" denotes items which were not released in that country or failed to chart.

=== EPs ===
List of extended plays, with selected details
Title	Album details
Small & Sweet	Released: April 4, 2009; Label: Self-released; Format: CD
Sense of Transcendence	Released: November 15, 2011; Label: Self-released; Format: Digital download, streaming
Side by Side	Released: November 20, 2015; Label: Spacebomb, Columbia; Format: Digital download, streaming

=== Singles ===
==== As lead artist ====
List of singles, with selected chart positions, showing year released and album name
Title	Year	Peak positions		Album
Title	Year	US AAA	BEL (FL) Tip	Album
"Any Time, Any Place"	2014	—	—	Non-album single
"Why Don't You Believe In Me"	2015	—	77	Natalie Prass
"Bird of Prey"	2015	—	74	Natalie Prass
"Short Court Style"	2018	32	14	The Future and the Past
"Lost"	2018	—	—	The Future and the Past
"Sisters"	2018	—	—	The Future and the Past
"Wild Horses - Amazon Original" (Prefab Sprout cover)	2019	—	—	Wild Horses (Amazon Original)
"—" denotes items which were not released in that country or failed to chart.

==== As featured artist ====
List of singles as featuring artist, showing year released and album name
Title	Year	Album
"Cool Out" (Matthew E. White featuring Natalie Prass)	2016	Non-album single

=== Guest appearances ===
List of non-single guest appearances, with other performing artists, showing year released and album name
Title	Year	Artist(s)	Album
"All"	2013	Cherub	MoM & DaD
"Red Face Boy"	2013	Howard Ivans	Red Face Boy EP
"Both Sides Now"	2014	Alva Leigh	In Nashiville EP
"The Way to Love Me"	2016	Gabe Dixon	Turns to Gold
"Watch My Back"	2016	Cocoon	Welcome Home
