= Bedouine =

Syrian-American musician (born 1985)

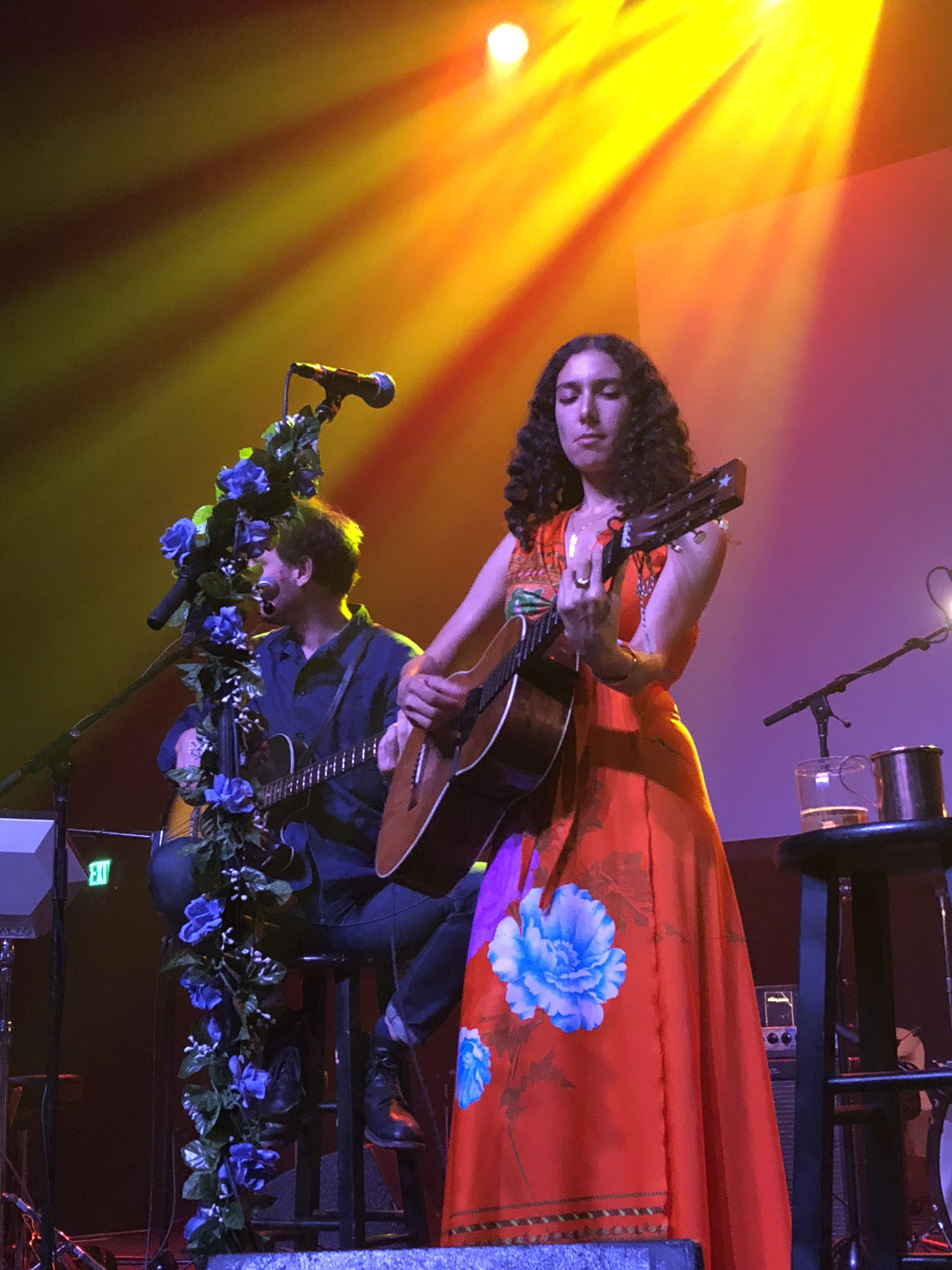
- Bedouine at The Fonda Theater in 2018

Background information
- Born: July 15, 1985 (age 41); Aleppo, Syria
- Genres: Singer-songwriter, folk
- Years active: 2017–present
- Website: www.bedouinemusic.com

Azniv Korkejian, known by her stage name Bedouine (born July 15, 1985), is a Syrian-American musician. She has lived in a number of cities and countries, including Saudi Arabia, Houston, Syria, and Boston.

== History ==
=== Early life ===
Korkejian was born in Aleppo, Syria. Her family moved to Saudi Arabia where they lived until she was ten. Her family is Armenian. She was educated at an American school in Saudi Arabia and was exposed to the music of MTV as well as traditional Armenian and Arabic music. The family moved to the US after winning a green card lottery and lived first in Massachusetts and then later in Houston, Texas, where she went to high school. She studied sound design in Savannah, Georgia. She lives in Los Angeles.

=== Name origins ===
Bedouine draws origin for her name from the Arabic term "Bedouin", which in the Syrian language alludes to the "Desert Dwellers", or those who lead a nomadic lifestyle. She herself claims to relate personally to this way of life, having moved residence so often in her early life, as well as taking great interest in Bedouin craft and way of life, specifically in connection with her home countries of Syria and Saudi Arabia. Furthermore, Bedouine connects her stage name and her Armenian ancestry, paying tribute to the 20th century genocide on Armenians, which forced them to abandon their homes and way of life, or face murder at the hands of the Ottoman Empire.

=== Bedouine ===
Bedouine released her first self-titled full-length album in 2017. The record includes sounds from her memories of her grandmother's home in Syria, specifically on "Summer Cold" and a song written in Armenian "Louise" (which translates to "light” and is written as Լոյս in Armenian). In an interview with Sound of Boston, Korkejian discussed writing the song in Western Armenian, the dialect her family speaks: “I was pretty shy about it because, like I said, my Armenian is kind of broken. But, I ran it by my cousin and kind of had his green light, and I got to a point where I just thought, even if it’s not perfect it’s okay because it’s still my experience.”

The album art of her debut album features a photograph taken of Bedouine on the black-and-white tiled floor of the console room outside Gus Seyffert's studio, where she recorded the album.

=== Bird Songs of a Killjoy ===
In March 2019, Bedouine announced her second full-length album, Bird Songs of a Killjoy, which was released June 21, 2019. The twelve tracks contain several references to birds, and Azniv's label Spacebomb quoted her as feeling "self-conscious about how I go on and on about birds on this record...But I have to step back and take a breath. These songs are just where I landed, and that's OK." The album was produced by Gus Seyffert.

=== Waysides ===
Bedouine released her third full-length album, Waysides on October 22, 2021. The album was announced August 18, 2021 with the single "The Wave", which was written about the death of Bedouine's close friend and her resulting grief. Korkejian did not write new material for the album, instead she selected and finished tracks from among her old demos, the oldest dating back 15 years, the newest from 2017. She’s described the process as “like spring cleaning, letting go to start anew”. All tracks were produced either by the singer herself or Gus Seyffert, who worked on both Bedouine and Bird Songs of a Killjoy.

== Tours ==
Headline tours

- US Tour (Fall 2019)
- UK/EU Tour (Fall 2019)
- North American Tour (Fall 2026)

Support tours

- Fleet Foxes (US Tour, Summer 2017)
- Matthew E. White (UK Tour, Fall 2017)
- Michael Kiwanuka (UK Tour, Fall 2017)
- José González (US Tour, Winter 2018)
- Real Estate (US Tour, Winter 2018)
- Waxahatchee / Hurray For The Riff Raff (US Tour, Spring 2018)
- Kevin Morby (US Tour, Summer 2018)
- Bahamas (US Tour, Fall 2018)
- Father John Misty (UK/EU Tour, Fall 2018)
- José González (EU Tour, Summer 2019)

Festivals

- Best Kept Secret (2018)
- Clandestino (2018)
- Likeminds (2018)
- Nelsonville Music Festival (2018)
- Newport Folk Festival (2018)
- Pickathon (2018)
- Waking Windows (2018)
- WOMAD (Australia) (2018)
- Calgary Folk Music Festival (2019)
- Huichica Music Festival (2019)

== Discography ==
Studio albums

- Bedouine (2017, Spacebomb Records)
- Bird Songs of a Killjoy (2019, Spacebomb Records)
- Waysides (2021, self-released)
- Neon Summer Skin (2026, self-released)

Singles

- "Come Down in Time" (2018, Spacebomb Records)
- "The Hum" (2020, Spacebomb Records)
- "All My Trials" (2020, Mexican Summer)
- "Thirteen" (2020, Spacebomb Records)
- "That You Are" (2024, Hozier)
