= Flo Morrissey =

The Honourable Flo Morrissey
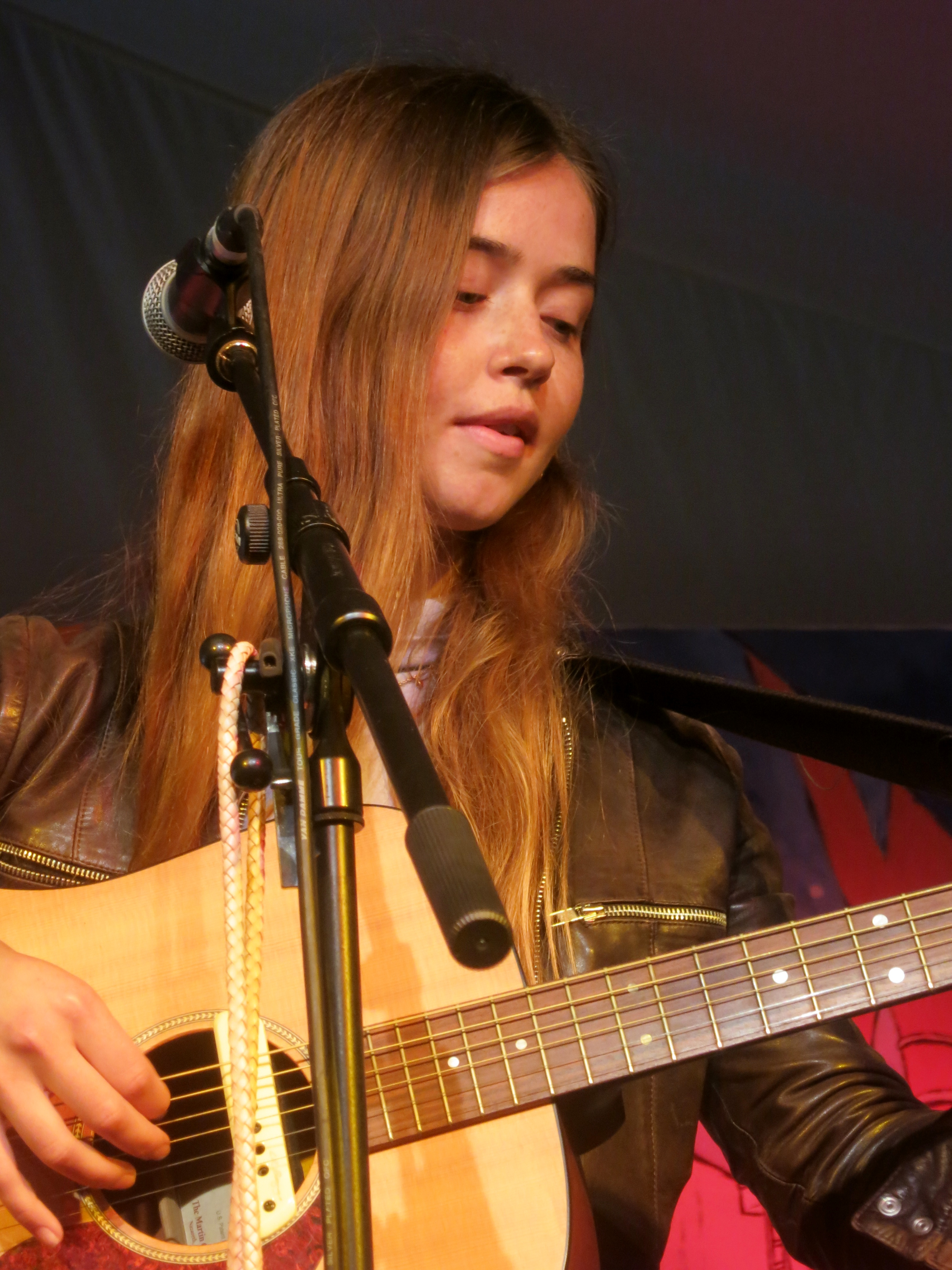
- Flo Morrissey in 2015

Background information
- Born: Florence Elizabeth J. Morrissey; 25 December 1994 (age 31); London, England
- Genres: Folk; pop
- Occupations: Singer; songwriter; guitarist
- Instruments: Vocals; guitar
- Years active: 2014–present
- Labels: Glassnote Records; Preserve Artists

Florence Elizabeth J. Clementine (née Morrissey; born 25 December 1994), better known by her stage name Flo Morrissey, is an English singer-songwriter from Notting Hill, London. She has released two albums and three singles, and has toured internationally.

== Biography ==
Born in London to a large family with eight siblings, Flo Morrissey discovered an interest in folk music at an early age. She is the daughter of Helena, Baroness Morrissey, a former CEO of Newton Investment Management, and Richard, a Buddhist monk and former financial journalist. Morrissey began to write her own songs at the age of 14 and left school three years later, and gained a place at the BRIT School for Performing Arts and Technology where she studied music for two years. Deciding upon a career in music, after leaving the BRIT school, she commented, "it has meant that I haven’t met many like-minded people, like I might have if I’d gone to university". After releasing a video performing the song "If You Can’t Love This All Goes Away," she was signed to Glassnote Records. The recording sessions for her debut album took place during the summer of 2014 in Los Angeles. In December 2014, Morrissey released the single "Pages of Gold," to be followed in June 2015 by the album Tomorrow Will Be Beautiful, produced by Noah Georgeson and Philippe Zdar. Morrissey was featured on a number of festivals in 2015, including Glastonbury. In September, she moved to Paris while she toured Japan and North America and released the single "Show Me" in December 2015. On January 13, 2017, Morrissey released an album of covers with Matthew E. White entitled Gentlewoman, Ruby Man. It received four out of five stars from The Guardian's Alexis Petridis.

Morrissey is divorced from British singer-songwriter Benjamin Clementine; the couple had their first child Julian Jupiter Richard Sainte-Clémentine on Florence's birthday, Christmas Day, 2017. A daughter, Helena Clementine, was born on 29 October 2019, in Ojai, California. Morrissey and her husband collaborate musically as the duo The Clementines, releasing the single "Calm Down" on 14 February 2020.

== Discography ==
=== Albums ===
as Flo Morrissey

- Tomorrow Will Be Beautiful (Glassnote, 2015)

with Matthew E. White

- Gentlewoman, Ruby Man (Glassnote, 2017)

as Florence Clementine

- One Mile Upstream (Preserve, 2024)

=== Singles ===
as Flo Morrissey

- "Pages of Gold" (2014)
- "If You Can't Love This All Goes Away" (2015)
- "Show Me" (2015)

as The Clementines (duo with Benjamin Clementine)

- "Calm Down" (2020)

as Florence Clementine

- "Easy Kind Of Man" (2022)
- "Transformation" (2024)
