= Gentlewoman, Ruby Man =

Studio album by Flo Morrissey and Matthew E. White
- Released: 13 January 2017
- Genre: Indie rock
- Length: 42:16
- Label: Glassnote Records

Gentlewoman, Ruby Man is a cover album by English singer and songwriter Flo Morrissey and American musician Matthew E. White, released on 13 January 2017 by Glassnote Records. The album consists of a series of versions of tracks by artists such as Frank Ocean, The Velvet Underground, Leonard Cohen, James Blake, and the Bee Gees.

Professional ratings
Review scores
Source	Rating
AllMusic	3/5 stars
The Guardian	4/5 stars
MusicOMH	4/5 stars
Drowned in Sound	3/5 stars

== Track listing ==
No.	Title	Length
1.	"Look at What the Light Did Now" (Little Wings)	3:21
2.	"Thinking 'Bout You" (Frank Ocean)	3:44
3.	"Looking for You" (Nino Ferrer)	4:40
4.	"The Colour in Anything" (James Blake)	2:58
5.	"Everybody Loves the Sunshine" (Roy Ayers)	4:47
6.	"Grease" (Barry Gibb)	4:21
7.	"Suzanne" (Leonard Cohen)	4:41
8.	"Sunday Morning" (The Velvet Underground)	3:37
9.	"Heaven Can Wait" (Charlotte Gainsbourg)	3:49
10.	"Govindam" (George Harrison)	6:15
Total length:		42:16
