= Big Inner =

Studio album by Matthew E. White
- Released: August 21, 2012
- Genre: Pop/Rock, indie rock, psychedelic rock
- Label: Spacebomb Records, Hometapes, Domino
- Producer: Matthew E. White

Matthew E. White chronology
Big Inner (2012)	Fresh Blood (2015)

Big Inner is the debut album from the artist Matthew E. White, released on August 21, 2012, on Spacebomb Records and Hometapes in the United States and Canada and on January 21, 2013, on Domino in the rest of the world.

== Reception ==
Professional ratings
Aggregate scores
Source	Rating
AnyDecentMusic?	8.3/10
Metacritic	85/100
Review scores
Source	Rating
AllMusic	3/5 stars
The Guardian	5/5 stars
The Independent	5/5 stars
The Irish Times	4/5 stars
Mojo	4/5 stars
NME	8/10
Pitchfork	8.1/10
Q	4/5 stars
Rolling Stone	3.5/5 stars
Uncut	9/10

Big Inner debuted at No. 19 on Billboard's Heatseekers Albums chart. The album received five stars from The Guardian and was called "One of the great albums of modern Americana" by Uncut magazine. It appeared on several "best of the year" lists in 2012, including those on Consequence of Sound, Pitchfork, and Blurt Magazine, and as a result of the album, White was named the No. 1 Best New Band by Paste and 2012 Breakthrough by eMusic.

== Reissue ==
In October 2013, Domino reissued Big Inner as a deluxe edition entitled Big Inner: Outer Face Edition with a second disc entitled Outer Face EP included with the original album.

== Track listing ==
No.	Title	Length
1.	"One of These Days"	5:19
2.	"Big Love"	4:39
3.	"Will You Love Me"	3:41
4.	"Gone Away"	6:54
5.	"Steady Pace"	4:15
6.	"Hot Toddies"	5:40
7.	"Brazos"	9:53
Total length:		41:03

Outer Face EP (Big Inner Outer Face Edition Bonus Disc)
No.	Title	Length
8.	"Eyes like the rest"	4:26
9.	"Signature Move"	4:05
10.	"Human Style"	4:15
11.	"In the Valley"	6:22
12.	"Hot Hot Hot"	7:46
Total length:		26:52

== Personnel ==
Over 30 musicians appear on the album: the Spacebomb House Band (Cameron Ralston on bass, Pinson Chanselle on drums and percussion, and Matthew E. White on guitar and vocals), a nine-piece horn section, an eight-piece string section, and a ten-piece choir.

Production

- Matthew E. White – producer, horn arrangements
- Phil Cook – choir arrangements
- Trey Pollard – string arrangements
- Lance Koehler – engineer
- Karl Blau – engineer, mixing
- Gene Paul – mastering
