= Trey Pollard =

American musician (born 1982)

- Born: November 19, 1982 (age 43)
- Origin: Richmond, Virginia
- Genres: Indie rock, Rock
- Occupations: arranger, Music producer, composer, conductor
- Instruments: Pedal steel guitar, guitar
- Label: Spacebomb

Trey Pollard (born November 19, 1982) is an American arranger, music producer, composer, conductor and instrumentalist in Richmond, Virginia. As co-owner and in-house arranger of Spacebomb Records, Trey has arranged orchestral arrangements for artists such as Matthew E. White, Natalie Prass, Foxygen, Helado Negro, The Waterboys, and Charlie Fink. In 2017, he composed music for the podcast S-Town from the producers of This American Life and Serial.

== Discography ==
- Matthew E. White – "Big Inner" (2012) string arranger
- Helado Negro – "Island Universe Story: Two" (2013) string arranger
- Grandma Sparrow – "Grandma Sparrow & His Piddletractor Orchestra" (2014) string arranger, horn arranger
- Helado Negro – "Island Universe Story: Three" (2014) pedal steel
- Natalie Prass – "Natalie Prass" (2015) string arranger, horn arranger, pedal steel
- Matthew E. White – "Fresh Blood" (2015) producer, arranger, guitar, pedal steel
- Helado Negro – "Private Energy" (2016) piano, pedal steel
- Foxygen – "Hang" (2017) orchestral arrangements, pedal steel
- Charlie Fink – "Cover My Tracks" (2017) string and woodwind arrangements
- The Waterboys – "Out Of All This Blue" (2017) string and brass arrangements
- Noam Weinstein - "Undivorceable" (2022) string arrangements & conducting
