= Spacebomb Records =

American indie record company based in Richmond, Virginia

- Founded: 2012
- Founder: Matthew E. White
- Genre: Indie rock, folk, experimental, pop
- Country of origin: U.S.
- Location: Richmond, Virginia
- Official website: spacebombrecords.com, spacebombstudios.com

Spacebomb Records is an independent record label based in Richmond, Virginia, co-founded by Matthew E. White in 2012. The label has released notable albums by Matthew E. White, Natalie Prass, and Bedouine. The label's first release, White's own Big Inner, garnered widespread attention and propelled the label to international recognition.

== Artists ==
- Angelica Garcia
- Bedouine
- Jackie Cohen
- McKinley Dixon
- Fruit Bats & Vetiver
- Georgie
- Grandma Sparrow
- Tim Heidecker
- Howard Ivans
- Matthew E. White & Lonnie Holley
- Andy Jenkins
- Trey Pollard
- Natalie Prass
- Nadia Reid
- Resound
- Sleepwalkers
- Spacebomb House Band
- Matthew E. White

== Discography ==
Spacebomb Releases
Artist	Title	Catalog number	Release date
Matthew E. White	"One of These Days" (7" single)	SB001	2012
Matthew E. White	Big Inner	SB002	2012
Howard Ivans	"Red Face Boy" (7" single)	SB003	2013
Grandma Sparrow	Grandma Sparrow & His Piddletractor Orchestra	SB004	2014
Natalie Prass	Bird of Prey	SB005	2015
Natalie Prass	Natalie Prass	SB006	2015
Natalie Prass	Side by Side (Live at Spacebomb Studios)	_	2015
Georgie	Company of Thieves	SB007	2016
Resound	Black History	SB008	2017
Resound	I Will Always Love You	SB009	2018
Bedouine	Bedouine	SB010	2017
Bedouine	"Louise"/"Deep Space" (7" single)	SB010B	2017
Howard Ivans	Beautiful Tired Bodies	SB011	2017
Spacebomb House Band	Library Music I: No Space High Enough	SB012	2018
Andy Jenkins	Sweet Bunch	SB013	2018
Hiss Golden Messenger	"Passing Clouds" (7" single)	SB014	2018
Jackie Cohen	Tacoma Night Terror Part 1: I've Got the Blues	SB015	2018
Spacebomb House Band	Library Music II: Temple of Engine Room	SB016	2018
Jackie Cohen	Tacoma Night Terror Part 2: Self-Fulfilling Elegy	SB017	2018
Sleepwalkers	Ages	SB018	2019
Trey Pollard	Antiphone	SB019	2018
Spacebomb House Band	Library Music III: For the Sun and the Waters	SB020	2018
Bedouine	Come Down in Time	SB021	2018
Jackie Cohen	Tacoma Night Terror, Part 1: I've Got the Blues / Part 2: Self-Fulfilling Elegy	SB022	2018
Spacebomb House Band	Library Music IV: Return of the End of Time	SB023	2018
Sleepwalkers	Night Sessions (Live at Spacebomb Studios)	SB024	2018
Fruit Bats & Vetiver	In Real Life (Live at Spacebomb Studios)	SB025	2019
Spacebomb House Band	V: Gold-Toothed & Lonesome	SB026	2019
Jackie Cohen	Zagg	SB027	2019
Spacebomb House Band	Known About Town (Record Store Day exclusive)	SB028	2019
Bedouine	Bird Songs of a Killjoy	SB029	2019
Sleepwalkers	Fault Is Me - Remixes	SB030	2019
Various Artists	All Together Now - 15 Years of the Richmond Folk Festival Live	SB031	2019
Angelica Garcia	Cha Cha Palace	SB032	2020
Sinkane	Gettin' Weird (Alive at Spacebomb Studios)	SB033	2019
Andy Jenkins	The Garden Opens	SB034	2019
Spacebomb House Band	VI: Connected by Birth and Employment	SB035	2019
Bedouine	The Hum	SB036	2020
Spacebomb House Band	VII: Something From Something	SB037	2019
Nadia Reid	Out of My Province	SB038	2020
Andy Jenkins	Far Away From Here (feat. Erin Rae)	SB040	2020
Trey Pollard & Roberto Carlos Lange	Antiphone (Roberto Carlos Lange Remixes)	SB043	2020
Spacebomb House Band	IX: The Best Played Lands	SB044	2020
Tim Heidecker	Fear of Death	SB046	2020
Spacebomb House Band	X: Kernel Eternal	SB048	2021
Matthew E. White and Lonnie Holley	'Broken Mirror: A Selfie Reflection'	SB050	2021
