= Matthew E. White =

American singer-songwriter and producer (born 1982)

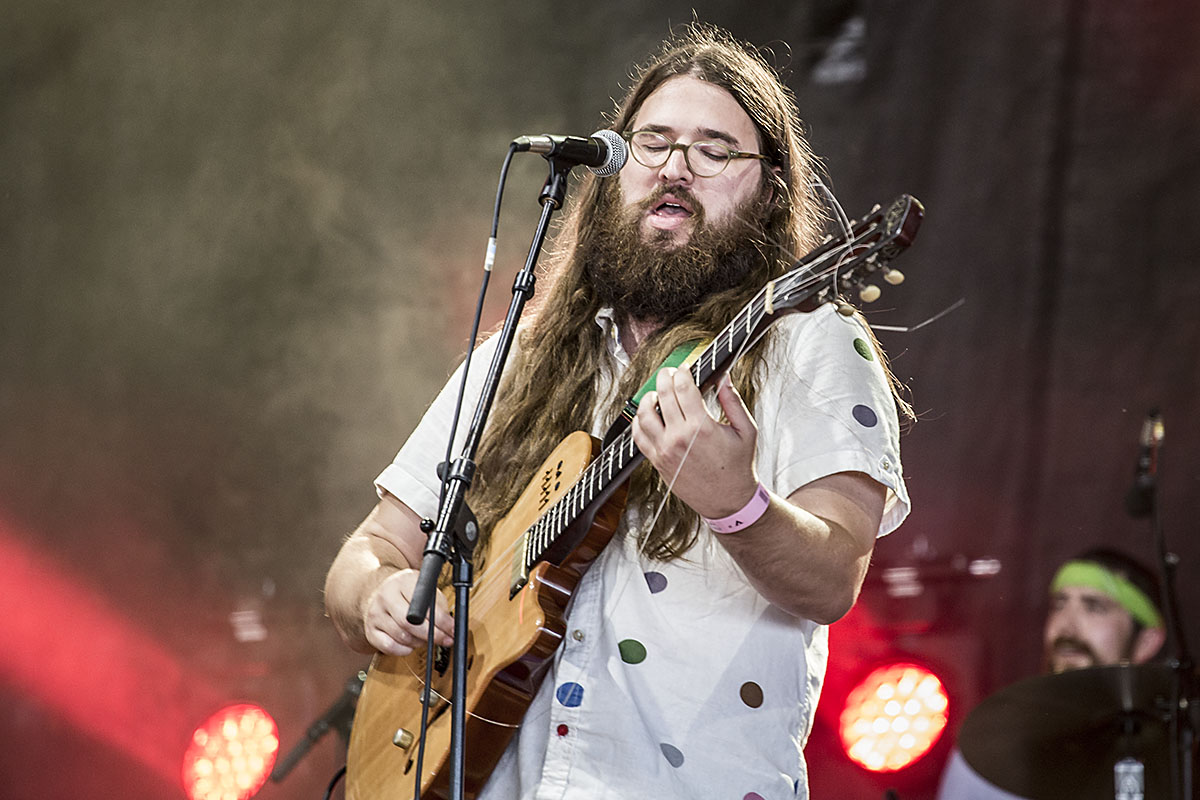
- Matthew E. White in Denmark, 2013.

Background information
- Born: August 14, 1982 (age 44); Virginia Beach, Virginia
- Origin: Richmond, Virginia
- Genres: Indie rock, alternative rock
- Instruments: Guitar, keyboards, vocals
- Labels: Domino, Spacebomb
- Member of: Fight the Big Bull
- Website: matthewewhite.co

Matthew E. White (born August 14, 1982) is an American singer, songwriter, producer and arranger. He has worked as a collaborator, producer, and arranger for acts including Bedouine, Natalie Prass, Cocoon, Foxygen, Justin Vernon, Hiss Golden Messenger, Sharon Van Etten, Ken Vandermark, Steven Bernstein, The Mountain Goats, Dan Croll and Slow Club. As a solo artist he has released two studio albums, Big Inner and Fresh Blood, and two collaboration albums, Gentlewoman, Ruby Man with Flo Morrissey and Broken Mirror: A Selfie Reflection with Lonnie Holley. White is also the founder and a co-owner of Spacebomb, originally conceived as a record label with a house band, and now a multi-disciplinary music company with a studio and offices in Richmond, Virginia.

== Early life ==
White was born in Virginia Beach, Virginia, US and from the age of three to eight lived in the Philippines with a final year living in Japan before returning to the US. During senior year high school in Virginia Beach, White joined a band with Natalie Prass, before moving to Richmond, Virginia to study jazz at Virginia Commonwealth University.

Following graduation White remained in Richmond and in 2005 founded the Patchwork Collective with a goal to bring creative music together regardless of genre. The group primarily focused on hosting a wide range of live performances including Jandek, who in 2007 approached the Patchwork Collective to promote a rare US show at the Firehouse in Richmond.

== Career ==
=== Fight the Big Bull ===
In 2006 White founded Fight the Big Bull, a Richmond, Virginia based improvisatory jazz ensemble with two of their 2010 recordings selected for NPR's best of the year lists. The band's original configuration, called simply Fight the Bull, was a trio with drummer Pinson Chanselle and trombonist Bryan Hooten. The group was subsequently expanded to eight players and collaborated with Chicago saxophonist Ken Vandermark and in 2010 released the album All is Gladness in the Kingdom with NYC-based slide trumpeter and composer Steven Bernstein following a 10-day residency that Bernstein undertook in Richmond. They also collaborated with alternative folk singer David Karsten Daniels, with White providing arrangement to his critically well-received 2010 Thoreau project I Mean to Live Here Still. A performance with Daniels at the NYC club La Poisson Rouge was reviewed by the New York Times.

White and Fight the Big Bull also provided the music for Duke University's 2011 tribute to Alan Lomax's "Sound of the South" field recordings in a concert featuring the band backing Bon Iver's Justin Vernon, Sharon Van Etten and members of Megafaun.

=== Solo (as Matthew E. White) ===
White released his debut album Big Inner in August 2012, which the New York Times called "a dramatic pop-gospel record that hits extremes of the mood spectrum." Big Inner debuted at number 19 on Billboard's Heatseekers Albums chart, and by the end of 2012, White had been named eMusic's Breakthrough Artist of 2012, Paste magazine's Best New Act of 2012, and a Consequence of Sound Rookie of the Year, and Big Inner had appeared on multiple best of 2012 lists. Following the album's initial release via Spacebomb White then signed with Domino who released the album worldwide in January 2013, and it received five stars from The Guardian and was called "One of the great albums of modern Americana" by Uncut magazine.

Following two years of extensive headline touring including festival performances at Glastonbury, Latitude, Roskilde, Primavera Sound, shows at The Hollywood Bowl, Sydney Opera House and Shepherd's Bush Empire White released his sophomore album Fresh Blood in March 2015 on Domino. In support of the album White made his national network television debut performing his track Rock and Roll is Cold on the Late Show with David Letterman in late March 2015. The album hit a peak of number 41 in the UK Albums Chart and the received generally positive reviews with a Metascore of 80 on Metacritic

K Bay, White's third record, was announced on Lauren Laverne's BBC Radio 6 Music breakfast show along with a debut of the album's first single "Genuine Hesitation". The following year, the album was included on the shortlist for the inaugural Newlin Music Prize in Richmond, Virginia.

=== Collaborations and production ===
In January 2017, White, along with English singer and songwriter Flo Morrissey, released Gentlewoman, Ruby Man, an album consisting of versions of tracks by artists such as Frank Ocean, the Velvet Underground, Leonard Cohen, James Blake, and the Bee Gees. The album was produced by White in Richmond, Virginia and released by Glassnote Records. The duo performed their cover of "Grease" on The Late Show with Stephen Colbert, before playing the album live four times at concerts in New York, London, Paris and Richmond, Virginia.

Between producing Natalie Prass' 2015 self titled debut album for Spacebomb, which Pitchfork awarded 8.4 and Best New Music, and her follow up The Future and the Past for ATO Records, the pair collaborated on the single Cool Out which was released for Record Store Day 2016, and later saw success when it featured in the closing scene of Netflix movie To All the Boys I've Loved Before in 2018.

After meeting back stage of London's Queen Elizabeth Hall at David Byrne's Meltdown Festival in August 2015, White teamed up with American visual artists and musician Lonnie Holley, to make Broken Mirror: A Selfie Reflection. The album was released by Spacebomb and Jagjaguwar in 2021.

== Discography ==
=== Albums ===
as Matthew E. White

Year	Album	Peak					Certification
Year	Album	BEL	DK	FR	SWE	UK	Certification
2012	Big Inner	85	12	143	25	85	
2015	Fresh Blood	95				41	
2021	K Bay						

with The Great White Jenkins

- 2007: Where Is Thy Sting?
- 2008: Mussel Souls

with Fight the Big Bull

- 2008: Dying Will Be Easy
- 2010: All Is Gladness in the Kingdom
- 2010: I Mean to Live Here Still (with David Karsten Daniels)

with Flo Morrissey

- 2017: Gentlewoman, Ruby Man (Glassnote Records)

with Lonnie Holley

- 2021:Broken Mirror: A Selfie Reflection
