= List of The Late Late Show with James Corden episodes (2019) =

- No. of episodes: 147 (and 1 special)

Release
- Original network: CBS

Season chronology
- ← Previous; 2018 episodes Next → 2020 episodes

This is the list of episodes for The Late Late Show with James Corden in 2019.

== 2019 ==
=== January ===
No.	Original release date	Guest(s)	Musical/entertainment guest(s)
573	January 7, 2019	KiKi Layne, John David Washington	Alec Benjamin
Side Effects May Include, Were You Paying Attention?
574	January 8, 2019	Ken Jeong, Brian Tyree Henry	H.E.R.
Tonight I Learned
575	January 9, 2019	Amy Adams, Tyler Perry	Mekki Leeper
Starting In Bad Commercials
576	January 10, 2019	Cedric the Entertainer, Ashley Graham	Flatbush Zombies
Dogs In Sunglasses, "Just The Way You Are" With Ashley Graham
577	January 14, 2019	Chungha, Andie MacDowell	Freya Ridings
Apple Watch Hidden Features, First/Last
578	January 15, 2019	Nina Dobrev, Terry Crews	Jack & Jack
What Can Terry Carry?
579	January 16, 2019	Cobie Smulders, Sebastian Stan, Joel Kim Booster	N/A
Nuzzle Whaaa???
580	January 17, 2019	Vanessa Hudgens, Andrew Rannells	N/A
Late Late Live Tinder
581	January 20, 2019	Chris Pratt, Elizabeth Banks, Will Arnett, Russell Wilson	N/A
Special live episode airing after AFC Championship Game. Chiefs Fans Outside Studio, NFL's Big Man Dance Crew, Astronaut Training, Dance Cam, Sunday Night Foodball, 'The Show's Ending Now' - Queen Parody Ft. Adam Lambert
582	January 22, 2019	Stephen Curry, Regina King, Ron Funches	Lauren Jauregui
Human Basketball Hoop, Harmony Lessons
583	January 23, 2019	Sonequa Martin-Green, Pete Holmes, Rebecca Ferguson	Ava Max
James Wanna See It
584	January 24, 2019	Neil Patrick Harris, Chelsea Peretti	Adam Newman
Audience Q&A
585	January 28, 2019	Eric McCormack, Danielle Macdonald	Paige Weldon
Were You Paying Attention
586	January 29, 2019	Regina Hall, Eugene Levy, Charlie Day	N/A
Honest Headlines, Cellphone Profile
587	January 30, 2019	Kevin Hart, Stephen James	Phosphorescent
Emoji News

=== February ===
No.	Original release date	Guest(s)	Musical/entertainment guest(s)
588	February 4, 2019	Laura Dern, Alfonso Cuarón	Beck
Matt Johnson Surviving "The World's Best", Celebrity Instagram
589	February 5, 2019	Billy Crystal, Sarah Chalke	Buddy
Like Us On, When Billy Met James
590	February 6, 2019	Alicia Keys, Hailey Bieber	Alicia Keys, Joe List
A Grammy Host Is Born - "Shallow" Parody, Spill Your Guts Or Fill Your Guts
591	February 7, 2019	Matt LeBlanc, Will Arnett	Broods
Malcolm & Margaret Corden Visit Superbowl LIII
592	February 11, 2019	Kelsey Grammer, Jay Baruchel	Alessia Cara
Tonight I Learned, Alessia Cara: Out of Love
593	February 12, 2019	Rebel Wilson, Priyanka Chopra Jonas	Justin Flom
Flinch
594	February 13, 2019	Courteney Cox, Nick Kroll	Betty Who
Late Late Live Tinder
595	February 14, 2019	Ray Romano, D'Arcy Carden	Lukas Graham
Tidying Up, Side Effect May Include
596	February 18, 2019	Mahershala Ali, Aaron Sorkin	Julia Michaels & Niall Horan
Late Late Show Escape Room, Honest Headlines
597	February 19, 2019	Sen. Elizabeth Warren, 50 Cent	TNT Boys, Ariana Grande
Ariana Grande Surprises TNT Boys f/ 'The World's Best'
598	February 20, 2019	Kate Walsh, Stephen Merchant	Natalie Prass
My Cordens, Celebrity Noses, Taller Or Shorter
599	February 21, 2019	Kal Penn, Chris O'Dowd	Adam Ferrara
James Having The Hots For The Hot Koala, None Of The Above

=== March ===
No.	Original release date	Guest(s)	Musical/entertainment guest(s)
600	March 4, 2019	Nick Jonas, Joe Jonas, Kevin Jonas	Jonas Brothers
Kidnapping The Jonas Brothers
601	March 5, 2019	Isla Fisher, Chiwetel Ejiofor	Jonas Brothers
Spill Your Guts Or Fill Your Guts, Jonas Brothers 2019
602	March 6, 2019	Allison Janney, Samuel L. Jackson	Jonas Brothers
Side Effects May Include w/ The Jonas Brothers
603	March 7, 2019	Cole Sprouse, Dan Levy	Jonas Brothers
Jonas Brothers Carpool Karaoke
604	March 11, 2019	Rita Wilson, Kevin Nealon, Jason Mitchell	Ryan Conner
David Beckham Statue Prank
605	March 12, 2019	Gordon Ramsay, Piper Perabo	Elle King
Record Collection, Treadmill Quiz
606	March 13, 2019	Sharon Osbourne, Sam Richardson	Ryan Conner
Animals Riding Animals
607	March 14, 2019	Kate Beckinsale, Milo Ventimiglia	Better Oblivion Community Center
Bruno Mars Soap Opera
608	March 18, 2019	Adam Scott, Taron Egerton	Miles Kane
Honest Headlines, James That Tune, Adam Or Scott
609	March 19, 2019	Ben Schwartz, Tim Roth	Leon Bridges
Mystery Pizza Box
610	March 20, 2019	David Boreanaz, Cam Newton	Daddy Yankee
Recap Of 2019 Winter
611	March 25, 2019	Max Greenfield, Maggie Siff	Dido
"We" ("Us" Parody), Apple Watch Hidden Features
612	March 26, 2019	Kobe Bryant, Cara Delevingne	Tom Walker
Spill Your Guts Or Fill Your Guts
613	March 27, 2019	Pamela Adlon, David Harbour	Wallows
'The Entrepooneur' - Theranos Parody, Were You Paying Attention?

=== April ===
No.	Original release date	Guest(s)	Musical/entertainment guest(s)
614	April 1, 2019	Rachel Bloom, Christopher Meloni, Rita Wilson	N/A
James Wanna See It
615	April 2, 2019	Zach Braff, Ben Platt	Ben Platt
Tonight I Learned, Soundtrack To A Bromance
616	April 3, 2019	Colin Farrell, Woody Harrelson	Buddy
Honest Headlines, Finding James's Inner-Shazam
617	April 4, 2019	Matthew McConaughey, Reba McEntire	Jimmy Buffett
Like Us On..., Audience Q&A
618	April 8, 2019	Bill Hader, Anna Chlumsky	Ally Brooke featuring Tyga
Emoji News
619	April 9, 2019	Zoe Saldaña, Jason Clarke	Kenny DeForest
Dogs In Sunglasses, Stage 56 Bar Tricks
620	April 10, 2019	Nikolaj Coster-Waldau	Sara Bareilles
Game of Thrones Recap, Writer Binge Watches Game of Thrones Series
621	April 15, 2019	Karlie Kloss, Max Minghella	Sean Paul & J Balvin
Late Late LIVE Tinder
622	April 16, 2019	Rob Lowe, Elle Fanning	Blood Orange
James Corden's Parents Watching Game of Thrones, Taller Or Shorter
623	April 17, 2019	Seth MacFarlane, Linda Cardellini	The 1975
Audience Errands
624	April 18, 2019	Andrew Garfield, Lake Bell	BLACKPINK
James & Andrew Garfield Can't Land On Game of Thrones, Flinch
625	April 29, 2019	Dax Shepard, Jodie Comer, Paul Rudd	Avril Lavigne
Celebrity Instagram, Naptime Boys
626	April 30, 2019	Topher Grace, Jason Schwartzman, Chad Daniels	N/A
Honest Headlines, None Of The Above

=== May ===
No.	Original release date	Guest(s)	Musical/entertainment guest(s)
627	May 1, 2019	Dr. Phil McGraw, Timothy Simons	Ashley Tisdale
Cell Phone Profile
628	May 2, 2019	Anna Faris, Kunal Nayyar	Shaggy
Romcom Role Call
629	May 6, 2019	Charlize Theron, Seth Rogen	Lauren Jauregui
Animals Riding Animals
630	May 7, 2019	Chelsea Handler, Ginnifer Goodwin	Tom Odell
Record Collection, Celebrity Noses
631	May 8, 2019	Christina Applegate, Kenneth Branagh	Rival Sons
OutFOXed, Mother Face-Off
632	May 9, 2019	Anne Hathaway, Rebel Wilson	Andy Sandford
Anne Hathaway & Rebel Wilson Battle For James
633	May 13, 2019	Lisa Kudrow, Will Forte, Jason Sudeikis	Sarah Tollemache
Cell Phone Profile
634	May 14, 2019	Lily Collins, Charles Melton	NCT 127
Tonight I Learned, Flinch
635	May 15, 2019	Octavia Spencer, Henry Winkler	N/A
James Wanna See It, Squeeze Play
636	May 16, 2019	Halle Berry, Anjelica Huston, Allison Williams	Carly Rae Jepsen
Spill Your Guts Or Fill Your Guts
Special	May 20, 2019	N/A	N/A
Best of Carpool Karaoke (primetime special). Includes new Carpool Karaoke segment with Celine Dion.
637	May 20, 2019	Renée Zellweger, Ben Kingsley	Oliver Tree
Were You Paying Attention?
638	May 21, 2019	Jessica Alba, Gabrielle Union	Josh Gondelman
Like Us On..., Emoji News
639	May 22, 2019	Elizabeth Banks, David Tennant	Billy Ray Cyrus
Apple Watch Hidden Features
640	May 23, 2019	Lucy Liu, James Marsden	N/A
Crosswalk The Musical - Aladdin with Will Smith

=== June ===
No.	Original release date	Guest(s)	Musical/entertainment guest(s)
641	June 10, 2019	Mark Hamill, Bradley Whitford	Lewis Capaldi
Billy Porter Broadway Karaoke During Tony Awards Break
642	June 11, 2019	Tristan Rogers, Adam Scott	N/A
Late Late LIVE Tinder
643	June 12, 2019	Tony Bennett, Don Cheadle	Keane
Tony Awards Red Carpet, Taller Or Shorter
644	June 17, 2019	Joel Fuschino, Gillian Anderson	David Blaine
Dodgeball USA Vs. UK, David Blaine Goes Underwater for a Card Trick & Wine
645	June 18, 2019	Lily James, Millie Bobby Brown	Little Mix
Battle Of The Waiters, Dogs In Sunglasses, James Discusses 2017 Grenfell Tower Fire
646	June 19, 2019	Ian McKellen, Louis Tomlinson, Simon Pegg	N/A
Crosswalk The Musical, Take A Break
647	June 20, 2019	Michael Sheen, Paul Giamatti	Mumford & Sons
Double Decker London Tour

=== July ===
No.	Original release date	Guest(s)	Musical/entertainment guest(s)
648	July 22, 2019	Paul Scheer, Stana Katic	The 1975
Were You Paying Attention
649	July 23, 2019	Eva Longoria, Thomas Lennon	N/A
Emoji News
650	July 24, 2019	Sutton Foster, Eddie Izzard	Dave Ross
Side Effects May Include, Who's Your Costar?
651	July 25, 2019	Keegan-Michael Key, Terry Crews	Joshua Jay
Audience Errands, Honest Headlines
652	July 29, 2019	Jeff Goldblum, Andie MacDowell	Bishop Briggs
Drop The Mic
653	July 30, 2019	John Legend, Mandy Moore	Hollywood Vampires
Riff Off
654	July 31, 2019	Patricia Arquette, Michael Peña	The Bird and the Bee featuring Dave Grohl
Reggie Watts On Bold And The Beautiful

=== August ===
No.	Original release date	Guest(s)	Musical/entertainment guest(s)
655	August 1, 2019	Jamie Bell, Margaret Qualley	Freya Ridings
James Wanna See It
656	August 5, 2019	Pete Holmes, Domhnall Gleeson, Aldis Hodge	Machine Gun Kelly with Yungblud
James Acknowledges The Mass Shootings In El Paso, Texas and Dayton, Ohio, Record Collection
657	August 6, 2019	Melissa McCarthy, Elisabeth Moss	Jakob Dylan & Jade Castrinos
Audience Q&A
658	August 7, 2019	Joel McHale, Betty Gilpin	N/A
Dogs In Sunglasses, Nate Fernald Commercial Actor, Taller Or Shorter
659	August 8, 2019	Ron Burgundy, Josh Gad, Michaela Watkins, Rick Schwartz	N/A
Ron Burgundy Stand Up
660	August 12, 2019	Greg Kinnear, Judy Greer	Bazzi
Hobbs & Shaw Audition
661	August 13, 2019	RuPaul, David Oyelowo, Alfie Allen	N/A
Watts Love Got To Do With It
662	August 14, 2019	Anthony Anderson, Jared Harris	Christian Finnegan
Riff-Off
663	August 15, 2019	Michael Douglas, Nicole Byer	N/A
Summer 2019 Recap, Judging James Corden Cakes

=== September ===
No.	Original release date	Guest(s)	Musical/entertainment guest(s)
664	September 3, 2019	Dominic Cooper, Jonathan Groff	Red Hearse
Side Effects May Include, Treadmill Quiz
665	September 4, 2019	Marc Maron, Jillian Bell	Keane
Like Us On..., Stage 56 Bar Tricks
666	September 5, 2019	Orlando Bloom, Yvonne Strahovski	O-Town
Lost Causes
667	September 9, 2019	Sean Hayes, Kate Bosworth	Charlotte Day Wilson
James & Sean Don't Wanna Duet, BachelorIT
668	September 10, 2019	Kris Jenner, James Van Der Beek	half•alive
Tonight I Learned, Hi-Lo
669	September 11, 2019	Jay Duplass, Alexandra Daddario	Noah Gardenswartz
Audience Errands, Emoji News
670	September 12, 2019	Ed Helms, June Diane Raphael	5 Seconds of Summer
James Responds To Bill Mahar's Fat Shaming Take, Tattoo Roulette
671	September 16, 2019	Constance Wu, Neil Patrick Harris	Sheryl Crow
Apple Watch Hidden Features
672	September 17, 2019	Angela Bassett, Jim Gaffigan	N/A
Were You Paying Attention
673	September 18, 2019	Kirsten Dunst, Billy Porter	Andrew Orolfo
Honest Headlines, Billy Porter BIG Entrance
674	September 19, 2019	Michelle Dockery, Max Greenfield	Alessia Cara
Celebrity Noses, UK Vs. US
675	September 23, 2019	Rob Corddry, Lake Bell	Anna Drezen
Beard Challenge, Book Quiz
676	September 24, 2019	Terrence Howard, Allen Leech	N/A
Late Late LIVE Tinder
677	September 25, 2019	Ashley Tisdale, Taran Killam	Cherry Glazerr
Celebrity Instagram, Know For Your Row
678	September 26, 2019	Ellen Pompeo, Mike Colter	Loud Luxury, Bryce Vine
James Wanna See It
679	September 30, 2019	Christian Slater, Kaitlyn Dever	Gary Clark Jr.
Dogs In Sunglasses, Know Your Co-Star

=== October ===
No.	Original release date	Guest(s)	Musical/entertainment guest(s)
680	October 1, 2019	Michelle Pfeiffer, Chiwetel Ejiofor	Mj Rodriguez & George Salazar
Know For Your Row
681	October 2, 2019	Allison Janney, Jonathan Van Ness	Tom Walker
Full Steam Ahead
682	October 3, 2019	Cobie Smulders, Kristin Chenoweth	Kristin Chenoweth
Clown Fight, Taking A Stance On Streaming Services
683	October 7, 2019	Ben Platt, Zoey Deutch	N/A
Going Vegan, Animals Riding Animals
684	October 8, 2019	Bradley Whitford, Whitney Cummings	King Calaway
Chance the Rapper Carpool Karaoke
685	October 9, 2019	Adam DeVine, Kieran Culkin	Adam Lambert, ISMO
Baby Interrogation
686	October 10, 2019	Aaron Paul, Neil deGrasse Tyson	Brittany Howard
Audience Q&A, Aaron Or Paul?
687	October 21, 2019	Paul Rudd, Hasan Minhaj	Anthony Ramos
3+ Minutes Of Paul Rudd Sleeping, Were You Paying Attention?
688	October 22, 2019	Joel Edgerton, Harry Connick Jr.	Noah Cyrus
None Of The Above
689	October 23, 2019	Demi Moore, Maggie Gyllenhaal	Jay Larson
Spill Your Guts/Fill Your Guts
690	October 24, 2019	Edward Norton, Leslie Odom Jr., Zazie Beetz	N/A
DNA Paternity Report
691	October 28, 2019	John Lithgow, Louis Tomlinson, Rebecca Ferguson	Louis Tomlinson
Airplane Karaoke
692	October 29, 2019	Hailee Steinfeld, Gugu Mbatha-Raw	Mallrat
Late Late Fight Club, Record Collection
693	October 30, 2019	Arnold Schwarzenegger, Linda Hamilton	N/A
Subpoena The Teenage Witch, Spill Your Guts Or Fill Your Guts
694	October 31, 2019	Jason Momoa, Alfre Woodard	The Hollywood Vampires
Audience Errands, Pumpkin Carving Contest

=== November ===
No.	Original release date	Guest(s)	Musical/entertainment guest(s)
695	November 4, 2019	Jessica Biel, Natasha Lyonne	Chris Garcia
Like Us On..., Taller Or Shorter
696	November 5, 2019	Hillary Rodham Clinton, Chelsea Clinton	Sheryl Crow
Honest Headlines, Mother Face-Off
697	November 6, 2019	Wiz Khalifa, Zach Woods	Sara Bareilles
2 Hours Off
698	November 7, 2019	Jane Krakowski, Paul Feig	Chvrches
Sesame Street Cast Crashes The Late Late Show, Know For Your Row
699	November 11, 2019	Kate Beckinsale, Josh Lucas	Andy Haynes
James Wanna See It
700	November 12, 2019	Laurie Metcalf, Jenny Slate	Billy Lockett
Late Late LIVE Tinder
701	November 13, 2019	Beth Behrs, Sam Claflin	Grace VanderWaal
Impeachment Coverage From Reggie, Tonight I Learned, UK Vs. USA
702	November 14, 2019	Don Johnson, Lilly Singh	Sleater-Kinney
Celebrity Instagram, Emoji News, James Message To Santa Clara
703	November 18, 2019	Helen Hunt, Ron Funches	Dave East
Dogs In Sunglasses, Stage 56 Bar Tricks
704	November 19, 2019	Josh Gad, Anna Camp	Adam Lambert
Apple Watch Hidden Features, Masked Singer
705	November 20, 2019	Julie Andrews, Kristen Bell	Gary Clark Jr.
Crosswalk The Musical
706	November 21, 2019	Chadwick Boseman, Sienna Miller, Stephan James	N/A
Cell Phone Profile
707	November 25, 2019	Jamie Lee Curtis, Thomas Middleditch	Pardison Fontaine featuring Offset
James & The Band Saying Not-So Nice Things To Each Other, Who's Your Co-Star
708	November 26, 2019	Kathy Bates, Billy Eichner	J.F. Harris
Mother Face-Off
709	November 27, 2019	Evan Rachel Wood, Melissa Benoist, Mike Birbiglia	Bloc Party
Cell Phone Profile

=== December ===
No.	Original release date	Guest(s)	Musical/entertainment guest(s)
710	December 4, 2019	John Travolta, Aaron Taylor-Johnson, Sam Taylor-Johnson	N/A
Starbucks Theater
711	December 5, 2019	Rebel Wilson, Kacey Musgraves	Kacey Musgraves
Soundtrack To A Christmas Love Story, Balloonatics
712	December 9, 2019	Billie Eilish, Ali Wong	Billie Eilish, Alicia Keys
Guest Host: Alicia Keys, Recap Of 2019, Taller Or Shorter
713	December 10, 2019	Kendall Jenner, Tracee Ellis Ross	Harry Styles
Guest Host: Harry Styles, Carpool Karaoke, Spill Your Guts Or Fill Your Guts
714	December 11, 2019	Nick Jonas, Rashida Jones	Vampire Weekend
Guest Host: Anthony Anderson, Anthony Anderson Taking Over, Audience Errans, Crosswalk Concert
715	December 12, 2019	Sam Rockwell, Camila Morrone	N/A
Guest Host: Jeff Goldblum, Animals Riding Jeff Goldblum
716	December 16, 2019	Taraji P. Henson, Lil Nas X	Chance the Rapper, Taylor Bennett
Guest Host: Chance the Rapper, Honest Headlines, Crying On Demand For $100, Nuzzle Whaaa?, Roo with Taylor Bennett
717	December 17, 2019	Jenny Slate, Kristen Schaal, Rick Schwartz	Mariah Carey
Guest Host: Ken Jeong, Medical Q&A
718	December 18, 2019	Laura Dern, Mark Duplass	Mariah Carey
Guest Host: Melissa McCarthy, Cut From New Star Wars, Celebrity Noses
719	December 19, 2019	Cast of Cats	Mariah Carey
Billie Eilish Carpool Karaoke, Boyz II Menorah, Santa Snaps At James, 'Cats' School
