= List of The Late Late Show with James Corden episodes (2016) =

- No. of episodes: 151 (and 2 specials)

Release
- Original network: CBS

Season chronology
- ← Previous; 2015 episodes Next → 2017 episodes

This is the list of episodes for The Late Late Show with James Corden in 2016.

== 2016 ==
=== January ===
No.	Original release date	Guest(s)	Musical/entertainment guest(s)
126	January 4, 2016	Sarah Silverman, Alicia Vikander, Taylor Kinney	Jamie Lee
2 Lies & 1 Truth
127	January 5, 2016	Sarah Hyland, Rami Malek, Jack McBrayer	N/A
People's Choice Vote, Kick It Out/Bring It Back
128	January 6, 2016	Kurt Russell, Paul Dano	N/A
Magic Trick, Fake Or Flop
129	January 7, 2016	Meghan Trainor, Gael García Bernal	Transviolet
All About That Change
130	January 11, 2016	Morgan Freeman, Zooey Deschanel, Tim Roth	N/A
Celebrity Noses, Emoji News
131	January 12, 2016	Betty White, Amar'e Stoudemire, Jack Hanna	Rachel Platten
Slow Lorus, Black Vulture & More
132	January 13, 2016	Tim Robbins, America Ferrera, Adam DeVine	N/A
Carpool Karaoke with Adele, Bad Neighbor Stories
133	January 14, 2016	Gillian Anderson, Tyler Perry	JR JR
Side Effects May Include, Senior Citizens Cinema
134	January 19, 2016	Jane Lynch, Carrie Brownstein, Joel Edgerton	N/A
Tonight I Learned, Apple Watch Hidden Features
135	January 20, 2016	J. K. Simmons, Josh Holloway	X Ambassadors
Reggie's Ice Sculptures, None of the Above
136	January 21, 2016	Lily James, Rashida Jones, Sean Hayes	BØRNS
James Gets Lost In a Stairwell, James & Sean Hayes on a Giant Piano, Beatboxing With Reggie Watts

=== February ===
No.	Original release date	Guest(s)	Musical/entertainment guest(s)
137	February 1, 2016	Nathan Fillion, Randall Park	Cirque Kurios
Reggie's Picks: Super Bowl 50
138	February 2, 2016	Maggie Grace, Josh Radnor	Nathan Sykes
Carpool Karaoke with Chris Martin
139	February 3, 2016	Rosie O'Donnell, Nikki Glaser, Addison Osta Smith	N/A
Football or Cake?, Steak Diane with MasterChef Junior's Addison Osta Smith
140	February 4, 2016	Eva Longoria, Tom Ellis	5 Seconds of Summer
James Corden's parents invade Super Bowl 50 Media Day, Telethon of 3 Million Thank Yous
141	February 7, 2016	Zac Efron, Anna Kendrick, Adam DeVine	Boyz II Men
Special live episode airing after Super Bowl 50. Pepsi Commercial Remake with Cindy Crawford, Carpool Karaoke with Elton John, History of Sports Movies in 7 Minutes, Reggie Watts' Halftime Show, Budweiser "Wassup" Commercial Parody
142	February 8, 2016	Mayim Bialik, Piers Morgan	Charlie Puth
Baby Super Bowl, Side Effects May Include
143	February 9, 2016	Jennifer Jason Leigh, Joe Manganiello, Von Miller	Glen Hansard
Magic Trick
144	February 10, 2016	Viola Davis, Malin Åkerman, LL Cool J	N/A
Trip To Super Bowl 50
145	February 11, 2016	Chiwetel Ejiofor, Grace Helbig, Jake Lacy	Albert Hammond, Jr.
Nuzzle Whaaa?
146	February 15, 2016	Chelsea Handler, Jason Schwartzman	Alessia Cara
Post-Grammys Drive with Justin Bieber, Rihanna Story, Spill Your Guts Or Fill Your Guts
147	February 16, 2016	Selma Blair, Juno Temple, Ben Feldman	N/A
Carpool Karaoke with Sia
148	February 17, 2016	Katie Holmes, Ryan Reynolds, Judd Apatow	Lianne La Havas
James Corden is Obsessed w/ American Crime Story: The People vs O.J. Simpson
149	February 18, 2016	Katie Couric, Gillian Jacobs, Anders Holm	N/A
Prince's Passport Photo, Deadpool Sidekick Auditions
150	February 22, 2016	Dr. Phil McGraw, Cristin Milioti, Shad Moss	Awolnation
Like Us On, Emoji News
151	February 23, 2016	Khloé Kardashian, Josh Duhamel	N/A
Late Late Live Tinder
152	February 24, 2016	Jenna Dewan Tatum, Norman Reedus	Miguel
Toddlerography with Jenna Dewan Tatum
153	February 25, 2016	Lucy Hale, Casey Affleck	N/A
Reggie's Picks, Vegas Mystery Room Service, Visual Effects Expert
154	February 29, 2016	Ellen Page, Jenny Slate, Paul Rust	N/A
Take a Break: Million Dollar Listing (featuring Tyga)

=== March ===
No.	Original release date	Guest(s)	Musical/entertainment guest(s)
155	March 1, 2016	JJ Redick, Freida Pinto, Saffron Burrows	N/A
Take a Break: Million Dollar Listing Part 2 (featuring JJ Redick)
156	March 2, 2016	Ginnifer Goodwin, Lea Michele	N/A
The People Vs. O.J. Simpson/Adele Mashup, Audience Q&A, Hot Coffee
157	March 3, 2016	Gerard Butler, Will Forte	M. Ward
Tonight I Learned, London Has Fallen Deleted Scene
158	March 7, 2016	Queen Latifah, David Walliams	Elle King
The Walking Desk, Kick It Out/Bring It Back
159	March 8, 2016	Neve Campbell, Jay & Mark Duplass	Gwen Stefani
Reggie Serenades BB-8, Side Effects May Include
160	March 9, 2016	Martin Short, Will Arnett	N/A
The People Vs. O.J. Simpson, Inappropriate Musicals
161	March 10, 2016	Connie Britton, Mark Cuban	Cameron Esposito
Take A Break
162	March 14, 2016	Amanda Peet, Max Greenfield	Panic at the Disco
Mystery Pizza Box, Killer Mom Dance Moves
163	March 15, 2016	Diane Lane, Paul Rudd	N/A
Never-Ending Urinal Conversation with Paul Rudd, None Of The Above
164	March 16, 2016	Colin Farrell, Wanda Sykes, Jack Hanna	Demi Lovato
Hide and Seek with Colin Farrell, Wanda Sykes and Demi Lovato at Natalie's House
165	March 28, 2016	Cuba Gooding Jr., Don Cheadle, Jon Bernthal	Troye Sivan
Break Dance Battle
Special	March 29, 2016	N/A	N/A
Best of Carpool Karaoke (primetime special). Includes new Carpool Karaoke segment with Jennifer Lopez
166	March 29, 2016	Kunal Nayyar, Rob Corddry, Mireille Enos	Atlas Genius
Celebrity Noses, Carpool Karaoke Replay with Jennifer Lopez
167	March 30, 2016	Ashton Kutcher, Danny Masterson, Thierry Henry	N/A
Primetime withdrawals, The People Vs. O.J. Simpson/Justin Bieber Remix, Dad Band, Target Practice
168	March 31, 2016	Luke Bryan, Sam Heughan, Rita Wilson	Rita Wilson
Honky Tonk In The UK, New Skype Emoticons, Reggie Shaves His Beard

=== April ===
No.	Original release date	Guest(s)	Musical/entertainment guest(s)
169	April 4, 2016	Aaron Paul, Jennifer Hudson	Hozier
Knee Cap Recap, Public Domain Songs
170	April 5, 2016	Gary Oldman, Salma Hayek, Ray Romano	N/A
Corporate Acronyms, Justin Bieber Soap Opera
171	April 6, 2016	Melissa McCarthy, Kristen Schaal	Kacey Musgraves
Audience Q&A
172	April 18, 2016	Emilia Clarke, Abbi Jacobson & Ilana Glazer	Rachel Feinstein
Happy Birthday James?, Emoji News
173	April 19, 2016	Gwyneth Paltrow, Andrew Rannells	The Last Shadow Puppets
Honest Headlines, Toddlerography
174	April 20, 2016	Lena Headey, Jon Favreau	N/A
Game of Thrones Hall of Faces, Kick It Out/Bring It Back, Ode To 4/20
175	April 21, 2016	Charlize Theron, Chris Hemsworth, Emily Blunt, Jessica Chastain	N/A
Tribute To Prince, Which of The Huntsman Cast Is Fairest of Them All?, Cell Phone Profile
176	April 25, 2016	Thomas Middleditch, Tom Hiddleston, Jack Hanna	Nathaniel Rateliff & The Night Sweats
Lemonjames: A Visual Monologue (Beyoncé Parody), Tonight I Learned
177	April 26, 2016	Ice Cube, Tony Hale, Maisie Williams	N/A
Side Effects May Include..., Reggie's Hobbies: Gardening
178	April 27, 2016	Ellie Kemper, Eric Christian Olsen, Jimmy Carr	N/A
Magic Trick: Newspaper, None of the Above
179	April 28, 2016	Eric Bana, Judy Greer	Joss Stone
Mystery Pizza Box, Don't Let Your Kids Watch Archer

=== May ===
No.	Original release date	Guest(s)	Musical/entertainment guest(s)
180	May 2, 2016	John Stamos, Tituss Burgess	Lukas Graham
John Stamos: The Perfect Mother's Day Present
181	May 3, 2016	Susan Sarandon, Josh Hopkins, Matt Walsh	Catfish and the Bottlemen
White House Stories, Ping Pong Showdown
182	May 4, 2016	Allison Janney, Bradley Whitford	Bibi Bourelly
The West Wing Walk-and-Talk with Allison Janney and Bradley Whitford, Carpool Karaoke with Gwen Stefani
183	May 5, 2016	Sharon Stone, Sebastian Stan, Zach Woods	Jamie Lawson
Wanna Date Her? She's Sharon Stone, Bitch
184	May 9, 2016	Elizabeth Olsen, Anthony Mackie, Cyndi Lauper	Zara Larsson
Girls Just Want Equal Funds, Emoji News
185	May 10, 2016	Jane Lynch, Rob Reiner, Thomas Lennon	Benjamin Clementine
360/VR Immersive Audience Experience
186	May 11, 2016	Simon Helberg, Chloë Grace Moretz, Adam Pally	N/A
Tonight I Learned, Face Your Father
187	May 12, 2016	Mindy Kaling, Gordon Ramsay	Transviolet
Honest Headlines, Hotel Hell
188	May 16, 2016	Dominic Cooper, Kristin Chenoweth	N/A
Demi Lovato & Nick Jonas Carpool Karaoke
189	May 17, 2016	Kate Beckinsale, Bill Hader	Catfish and the Bottlemen
Celebrity Noses: Private Emails, None of the Above
190	May 18, 2016	Chelsea Handler, Peter Krause	Broods
Late Late Live Tinder
191	May 19, 2016	Anthony Hopkins, Jerrod Carmichael	Ziggy Marley
Empire Season Finale Recap
192	May 23, 2016	John Leguizamo, Sacha Baron Cohen	Frightened Rabbit
Chewbacca Mom Takes James to Work, Audience Q&A: The Riddle
193	May 24, 2016	Anne Hathaway, Jim Sturgess	N/A
Corporate Acronyms: USPS, Facebook, Drop the Mic
194	May 25, 2016	Anna Paquin, John Cena	Fleur East
Crosswalk the Musical: The Lion King, Fleur East: Sax
195	May 26, 2016	Rebel Wilson, David Schwimmer	Twenty88
Stage 56 Bar Tricks: Jenga Whip, Marshmallow Roast, Nathaniel Rateliff & The Night Sweats: The Bandmate Game

=== June ===
No.	Original release date	Guest(s)	Musical/entertainment guest(s)
196	June 6, 2016	Geena Davis, Wayne Brady	Band of Horses
Carpool Karaoke featuring Hamilton and More
197	June 7, 2016	Tim Robbins, Marc Maron	Tom Odell
New Owners Of Website, Like Us On, Side Effects May Include
198	June 8, 2016	Ben Schwartz, Linda Cardellini	Tegan and Sara
James Is Sad, Mom Massage Website Empire Grows, Celebrity Instagram
199	June 13, 2016	Jane Fonda, Lily Tomlin, Anthony Anderson	N/A
Red Hot Chili Peppers Carpool Karaoke
200	June 14, 2016	Matt LeBlanc, Alison Brie	Eliot Sumner
"Curb Your Enthusiasm" Theme Usage
201	June 15, 2016	Kevin Hart, John C. Reilly	N/A
Tonight I Learned, Drop The Mic
202	June 16, 2016	Matt Bomer, Jena Malone, Bebe Rexha	Bebe Rexha
Take a Break, Honest Headlines
203	June 20, 2016	Queen Latifah, Laverne Cox	Nastasya Generalova
Selena Gomez Carpool Karaoke
204	June 21, 2016	David Duchovny, Jeff Bridges	N/A
Corporate Acronyms: Playboy, Yoga
205	June 22, 2016	Anna Kendrick, Jeff Goldblum	The Claypool Lennon Delirium
Emoji News
206	June 23, 2016	Luke Wilson, Liev Schreiber, Rob Gronkowski	Birdy
Side Effects May Include, Target Practice

=== July ===
No.	Original release date	Guest(s)	Musical/entertainment guest(s)
207	July 18, 2016	Zachary Quinto, Juliette Lewis	SWMRS
Emoji News
208	July 19, 2016	Julia Stiles, Zoe Saldaña, Paul Feig	Lewis Del Mar
Audience Q&A: The Medium
209	July 20, 2016	Aaron Sorkin, Cheryl Hines, Scott Speedman	N/A
James Corden Tributes Garry Marshall, Carpool Karaoke with Michelle Obama (eventually joined by Missy Elliott)
210	July 21, 2016	Chris Pine, Imogen Poots	N/A
Honest Headlines, Take a Break
211	July 25, 2016	Mila Kunis, Christina Applegate	Jared Logan
60 Minutes Interview With Hillary Clinton, Tonight I Learned, Spill Your Guts Or Fill Your Guts
212	July 26, 2016	Tatiana Maslany, Mike Birbiglia, Michael Wolfe & Tyler Harding	N/A
Side Effects May Include, Malcolm & Margaret Corden Visit WWE Monday Night RAW
213	July 27, 2016	Dave Franco, Cara Delevingne	LÉON
Drop The Mic

=== August ===
No.	Original release date	Guest(s)	Musical/entertainment guest(s)
214	August 1, 2016	Matt Damon, Keegan-Michael Key	N/A
"Jason Bourne" Stunt Double, Reggie's Hobbies
215	August 2, 2016	Bradley Cooper, Todd Phillips	Kent Jones
Celebrity Instagram, None Of The Above
216	August 3, 2016	Denis Leary, Salma Hayek	Lukas Graham
(Trump's an) ***hole, Kick It Out/Bring It Back
217	August 4, 2016	Hugh Grant, Bryce Dallas Howard	Local Natives
Like Us On, Celebrity Noses
218	August 22, 2016	Joel Kinnaman, Constance Zimmer	Ingrid Michaelson
Montell Jordan surprises James for his birthday, Montell and James sing "This Is How We Do It"
219	August 23, 2016	Ben Schwartz, Mary Elizabeth Winstead, Jason Derulo	Albert Hammond Jr.
Toddlerography
220	August 24, 2016	John Krasinski, Adam Pally, Jimmy Butler	Penn & Teller
John Krasinski & James Corden Were Cut From All Your Favorite Films
221	August 25, 2016	Kate Mara, Michael Kelly	N/A
Tonight I Learned, Britney Spears Carpool Karaoke
222	August 29, 2016	Heidi Klum, Josh Groban	Foy Vance
James Remembers Gene Wilder, First Line/Every Line
223	August 30, 2016	Patricia Arquette, Alison Pill, Justin Bartha	Tommy Johnagin
Emoji News
224	August 31, 2016	Kevin Bacon, Sarah Hyland	Saint Motel
Bacon Cologne, Stage 56 Bar Tricks

=== September ===
No.	Original release date	Guest(s)	Musical/entertainment guest(s)
225	September 1, 2016	Danny McBride, David Duchovny, Gabby Douglas, Nathan Adrian, Conor Dwyer	The Kills
Nuzzle Whaaa?, Where's Reggie:Fleet Week
226	September 6, 2016	Zach Woods, Robert Winston, Édgar Ramírez	N/A
Pile High Club
227	September 7, 2016	Susan Sarandon, Adam Brody	clipping.
Late Late Captions, Side Effects May Include
228	September 8, 2016	Michael Sheen, Mel B	Gavin DeGraw
Late Late Live Tinder
229	September 12, 2016	Meg Ryan, Adam Scott	Brian Fallon
Power Rankings, Beyonce Soap Opera
230	September 13, 2016	Donald Glover, Jimmie Johnson	Grouplove
Honest Headlines, Audience Q&A
231	September 14, 2016	Andy Samberg, Neil deGrasse Tyson	Globe of Steel
Late Late Captions, Mike Yung: Unchained Melody
232	September 15, 2016	Jimmy Kimmel, Patrick Dempsey, Renée Zellweger	CL
Spill your Guts or Fill your Guts w/ Jimmy Kimmel
233	September 19, 2016	Michael Weatherly, Rob Delaney	Rizzle Kicks
James Corden Reclaims His Billboard, Side Effects May Include
234	September 20, 2016	Alan Cumming, Jesse Tyler Ferguson	Nick Jonas
Inappropriate Musicals
235	September 21, 2016	Kurt Russell, Ellen Pompeo, Kristen Bell	Banks & Steelz
Late Late Captions: Rollercoaster, British Bridget Jones's Baby Auditions
236	September 22, 2016	Lucy Liu, Terry Crews, Jack Hanna	N/A
Terry Crews & James Almost Brawl, Porcupine, Armidillo, and a Camel
237	September 26, 2016	Lea Michele, Norm Macdonald	Nothing but Thieves
James Corden takes over as the new coach for Arsenal F.C.
238	September 27, 2016	Usain Bolt, Allison Janney, Owen Wilson	Eliza Skinner
100m Race, Kick It Out/Bring It Back
239	September 28, 2016	Anjelica Huston, Wilmer Valderrama	Shawn Mendes
Better Then/Better Now Riff-Off, Corporate Acronyms
240	September 29, 2016	Max Greenfield, Tig Notaro	Regina Spektor
Late Late Captions, Emoji News

=== October ===
No.	Original release date	Guest(s)	Musical/entertainment guest(s)
241	October 3, 2016	Jamie Lee Curtis, Kumail Nanjiani, Jeremy Clarkson, Richard Hammond, James May	Skylar Grey
Tonight I Learned, 'The Grand Tour' Grand Racing Quiz
242	October 4, 2016	Rob Lowe, J. K. Simmons	Eliza Skinner
Side Effects May Include, Game Show Disaster
243	October 5, 2016	Julie Chen, Beth Behrs	Kristin Chenoweth
Everyone Wants a Duet, Celebrity Noses
244	October 6, 2016	Zach Galifianakis, Taylor Lautner	Stevie Nicks
Late Late Captions
245	October 17, 2016	Dakota Fanning, John Stamos, Shaquille O'Neal	N/A
Shaq'd, Emoji News
246	October 18, 2016	Shia LaBeouf, Cobie Smulders, Rachel Bloom	N/A
Honest Headlines, Visiting County Fair Monster Truck Jamboree
247	October 19, 2016	Tom Cruise, Anna Faris	Weezer
Tom Cruise Roll Call
248	October 20, 2016	Cher, Gal Gadot	Pet Shop Boys
"I Got You Bae", James Corden's Sisters Invade the NFL in London
249	October 24, 2016	Nick Offerman, Ron Howard, Aldis Hodge	Norah Jones
Audience Q&A
250	October 25, 2016	Matt LeBlanc, Jeffrey Dean Morgan	Lady Gaga
Lady Gaga Takes Over Late Late Show, Carpool Karaoke
251	October 26, 2016	Ewan McGregor, Isla Fisher	Niall Horan
Spill Your Guts/Fill Your Guts
252	October 27, 2016	Andrew Garfield, January Jones, LL Cool J	N/A
Late Late Captions, "Candy" Halloween MV
253	October 31, 2016	Harry Connick Jr., Alice Eve	Lior Suchard
Getting Monster Mash'd, Side Effects May Include

=== November ===
No.	Original release date	Guest(s)	Musical/entertainment guest(s)
254	November 1, 2016	Mark Consuelos, Zooey Deschanel	Kenny Chesney
Endless Glove, Were You Paying Attention
255	November 2, 2016	Joel McHale, Julianne Hough	Gallant
Emoji News
256	November 3, 2016	Aaron Paul, Piper Perabo, Jack Hanna	N/A
Tonight I Learned, Late Late Captions
257	November 7, 2016	Benedict Cumberbatch, Dennis Quaid, Molly Shannon	Nathaniel Rateliff & The Night Sweat
The Tale Of Election 2016, Fake Or Flop
258	November 9, 2016	John Lithgow, Ryan Phillippe, Kyra Sedgwick	N/A
Take A Break
259	November 10, 2016	Chris Tucker, Hailee Steinfeld	Shura
Late Late Captions, First Line/Every Line
260	November 14, 2016	Gina Rodriguez	Idina Menzel
Honest Headlines, Emoji News
261	November 15, 2016	Matthew Broderick, Mandy Moore	N/A
Admiring A Young Joe Biden, A Fugue For Turkey, None Of The Above
262	November 16, 2016	Kendall Jenner, Michael Strahan	Hey Violet
Like Us On, Spill Your Guts/Fill Your Guts
263	November 17, 2016	Eddie Redmayne, Jessica Chastain	Iliza Shlesinger
Late Late Captions, 'Fantastic Beasts' of the TSA
264	November 21, 2016	Anna Kendrick, Billy Eichner, Kurt Braunohler	N/A
Tonight I Learned, Soundtrack To "Growing Up"
265	November 22, 2016	Aaron Eckhart, Trevor Noah	Green Day
Audience Q&A
266	November 23, 2016	Dana Carvey, Miles Teller, Usain Bolt	N/A
Side Effects May Include, Drop The Mic
267	November 30, 2016	Jessica Alba, Kate Mara, Ken Jeong	N/A
Corporate Acronyms, Flinch

=== December ===
No.	Original release date	Guest(s)	Musical/entertainment guest(s)
268	December 1, 2016	Queen Latifah, Morris Chestnut, Tracey Ullman	Machine Gun Kelly, Camila Cabello
Celebrity Noses
269	December 5, 2016	Gael García Bernal, Lauren Cohan	John Legend
Emoji News
270	December 6, 2016	Billy Crystal, Taron Egerton	CRX
Starbucks Theater
271	December 7, 2016	Lily Tomlin, Alison Sudol	Reggie Watts
Madonna Carpool Karaoke
272	December 8, 2016	Tracee Ellis Ross, Stephen Fry	Lukas Graham
Honest Headlines, Were You Paying Attention?
273	December 12, 2016	Chris Pratt, Olivia Munn	She & Him
Side Effects May Include, 2015 Christmas Party Lineup
274	December 13, 2016	Jennifer Lawrence, T. J. Miller	N/A
Bruno Mars Carpool Karaoke
275	December 14, 2016	Natalie Portman, Annette Bening	Neil Diamond
None Of The Above, Sweet Christmastime
276	December 15, 2016	Katie Holmes, Seth MacFarlane	Seth MacFarlane
Recap Of 2016, 'All I Want for Christmas' Carpool Karaoke
Special	December 24, 2016	N/A	N/A
Best Moments of 2016
