= List of The Late Late Show with James Corden episodes (2020) =

- No. of episodes: 131 (and 1 special)

Release
- Original network: CBS
- Original release: January 13 – December 17, 2020

Season chronology
- ← Previous; 2019 episodes Next → 2021 episodes

This is the list of episodes for The Late Late Show with James Corden in 2020.

== 2020 ==
=== January ===
No.	Original release date	Guest(s)	Musical/entertainment guest(s)
720	January 13, 2020	Rachel Brosnahan, RuPaul	N/A
Emoji News, Spot The Wig
721	January 14, 2020	Steve Buscemi, Tim Roth	SHAED
Honest Headlines, Marvel's Mrs. Maisel
722	January 15, 2020	January Jones, John Cena	Raanan Hershberg
'Reservoir Dogs' Bonus Scene, Flinch
723	January 16, 2020	Bradley Whitford, Brett Gelman	N/A
Riff-Off
724	January 21, 2020	Jane Fonda, Lily Tomlin	N/A
Late Late LIVE Tinder
725	January 22, 2020	Charlie Hunnam, Jesse Tyler Ferguson	Elbow
Were You Paying Attention?
726	January 23, 2020	Greta Gerwig, Noah Baumbach	Demetri Martin
James Wanna See It
727	January 27, 2020	Sting, Caitriona Balfe	Sting
Tribute To Kobe Bryant, None Of The Above
728	January 28, 2020	BTS, Cynthia Erivo, Ashton Kutcher	BTS
Hide & Seek
729	January 29, 2020	Kumail Nanjiani, Dan Levy	Celeste
Beard Bet Paid Off, Rad Bods Or Dad Bods?
730	January 30, 2020	Antonio Banderas, Rob Lowe	Kesha
Meghan Trainor Carpool Karaoke

=== February ===
No.	Original release date	Guest(s)	Musical/entertainment guest(s)
731	February 10, 2020	Dr. Phil McGraw, Lana Condor	Green Day
Cliff Hangers
732	February 11, 2020	Anna Faris, Michael Peña, Lou Sanders	N/A
Malcolm & Margaret Corden Visit Superbowl LIV
733	February 12, 2020	Aaron Paul, Will Arnett	Jonas Brothers
Malcolm & Margaret Corden Touring Miami, Sexy Suspect
734	February 13, 2020	Patrick Stewart, June Diane Raphael	N/A
Like Us On..., Know For Your Row
735	February 18, 2020	Justin Bieber, Billy Crystal, Ben Schwartz	N/A
Justin Bieber Carpool Karaoke
736	February 19, 2020	Justin Bieber, James Marsden, Anya Taylor-Joy	Jack Peñate
"Yummy" Food Truck, Toddlerography
737	February 20, 2020	Justin Bieber, Lucy Hale, Scott Bakula	Wajatta
Spill Your Guts
738	February 24, 2020	Christina Hendricks, Logan Lerman	Yola
Audience Errands, Apple Watch Hidden Features
739	February 25, 2020	BTS, Adam Pally, Mo Rocca	N/A
Carpool Karaoke
740	February 26, 2020	Cedric the Entertainer, Dave Bautista	Princess Nokia
Swedish "Carpool Karaoke" Song, Audience Q&A
741	February 27, 2020	Alison Brie, Will Forte	Doug Smith
Emoji News, Pony Tail Or Phony-Tail

=== March ===
No.	Original release date	Guest(s)	Musical/entertainment guest(s)
742	March 2, 2020	Mark Wahlberg, Iliza Shlesinger	Rob Haze
Were You Paying Attention
743	March 3, 2020	Martin Freeman, Pete Holmes	Bad Bunny
Cell Phone Profile
744	March 4, 2020	Usher, Allison Pill, Javier Hernández	N/A
Tonight I Learned, Chicharito Dunk Tank Target Practice
745	March 5, 2020	Liv Tyler, Norman Reedus	Blackbear
Usher Delivers Bad News
746	March 9, 2020	Niall Horan, Thandie Newton	Niall Horan
James Wanna See It
747	March 10, 2020	Annette Bening, Elle Fanning	Niall Horan
Honest Headlines, Tom's Hot Wings
748	March 11, 2020	Emily Blunt, Sam Heughan	Niall Horan
James & Niall Would Walk 500 Miles, Shock Therapy Quiz
749	March 12, 2020	Vin Diesel, Eiza González	Niall Horan
Carpool Karaoke
Special	March 30, 2020	Will Ferrell, David Blaine	BTS in South Korea, Andrea Bocelli in Italy, Dua Lipa in London, Billie Eilish featuring Finneas and John Legend in Los Angeles
Homefest: James Corden's Late Late Show Special (primetime special)

=== April ===
No.	Original release date	Guest(s)	Musical/entertainment guest(s)
750	April 13, 2020	Representative Nancy Pelosi	Alesso featuring Liam Payne
Getting JACKED For Next Zoom Metting, Remembering Hal Willner
751	April 14, 2020	Dan Levy	Meghan Trainor
Three Things To Cheer You Up, Trump's New Press Conference Advisor, Am I Wearing Pants Or PJ's
752	April 15, 2020	Yuval Noah Harari, Lewis Capaldi	Lewis Capaldi
James Corden Catches Up w/ Quarantined Parents
753	April 16, 2020	Bob Odenkirk, Leslie Jordan	JP Saxe featuring Julia Michaels
Three Things To Cheer Your Up, Shirt Off Shoot Out Challenge
754	April 20, 2020	Taraji P. Henson	Andrea & Matteo Bocelli
Checking In, Three Things To Cheer You Up
755	April 21, 2020	Vice President Joe Biden	Melanie C
Three Things To Cheer You Up
756	April 22, 2020	Ray Romano, Mike D & Ad-Rock	Alec Benjamin
Trump's Press Conference Advisor, Three Things To Cheer You Up
757	April 23, 2020	Hugh Jackman	Alec Benjamin
Stanley Tucci Makes A Martini, Goodnight Zoom
758	April 27, 2020	Joe Jonas	Yungblud
Three Things To Cheer You Up, Shirt Off Shoot Out Challenge, Mother Face Off
759	April 28, 2020	Thomas Middleditch, Ben Schwartz	Billie Joe Armstrong
Three Things To Cheer You Up, What's In My Lap, Show & Tell

=== May ===
No.	Original release date	Guest(s)	Musical/entertainment guest(s)
760	May 4, 2020	Allison Janney	5 Seconds of Summer
Three Things To Cheer You Up, 2020 Pet Gala
761	May 5, 2020	Alain de Botton	Barry Manilow
Three Things To Cheer You Up, James Surprises Staff Member, Behind The Scenes Of Trump's Disinfectant Idea
762	May 6, 2020	Beanie Feldstein	Machine Gun Kelly featuring Travis Barker
Three Things To Cheer You Up, James Being Replaced By A James Corden Soundboard, Can You Play That Instrument?
763	May 7, 2020	Laura Linney	Ellie Goulding
Three Things To Cheer You Up, Late Late Live Tinder
764	May 11, 2020	Nicholas Hoult, Lior Suchard	Sam Fischer
Three Staffers Welcoming Babies, Quarantine Haircuts
765	May 12, 2020	Jeff Goldblum	James Blake
Three Things To Cheer You Up, Talking To Late Late Show Staff, Nurse Apprectiation Week
766	May 13, 2020	Daisy Edgar-Jones, Paul Mescal	Leslie Odom Jr.
Three Things To Cheer You Up, Checking In With..., Live Chemistry Test
767	May 14, 2020	Tracy Morgan	Bazzi
Three Things To Cheer You Up, Celebrity Noses
768	May 18, 2020	Terry Crews	Old Dominion
Know For Some Dough, Friends Super-Fan Surprise
769	May 19, 2020	Ken Jeong	Ava Max
Ever After School Project, Trump's Press Conference Meltdown, Can These People Sing?
770	May 20, 2020	Simon Pegg	Ben Platt featuring FINNEAS
Three Things To Cheer You Up, Facing Your Partner
771	May 21, 2020	Rob Gronkowski, Venus Williams	HAIM
Three Things To Cheer You Up, Shirt Off Shoot Out Challenge, Protein Shake-Up

=== June ===
No.	Original release date	Guest(s)	Musical/entertainment guest(s)
772	June 1, 2020	Keegan-Michael Key, Dr. Michael Eric Dyson	Dave
James discusses the murder of George Floyd
773	June 2, 2020	Michael Sheen	Justin Willman
Three Things You Can Do To Help
774	June 3, 2020	Representative Val Demings	M. Ward
Three Things You Can Do To Help, Know For Some Dough
775	June 4, 2020	Anna Kendrick	Alanis Morissette
Three Things You Can Do To Help
776	June 8, 2020	Matthew Macfadyen	Jessie Ware
Three Things
777	June 9, 2020	Senator Cory Booker	Josh Groban
Three Things
778	June 10, 2020	Gayle King	Adam Lambert
Three Things
779	June 11, 2020	Mayor Muriel Bowser	Brandy Clark
Three Things
780	June 15, 2020	Josh Gad	Anuel
Three Things, Frozen Or Pose'n, Josh Gad Narrates Documentaries as Olaf
781	June 16, 2020	Todrick Hall, Kevin Bacon	Rita Wilson
Three Things, Todrick Hall TikTok Challenge
782	June 17, 2020	Governor Gavin Newsom	Doja Cat
Three Things, Face Your Father
783	June 18, 2020	David Tennant, Jodie Whittaker	Leon Bridges featuring Terrace Martin and Robert Glasper
Three Things, 'Doctor Who' Cosplay Contest
784	June 22, 2020	Lena Waithe	Raleigh Ritchie
Weekend Recap, Amazing Andy
785	June 23, 2020	Will Ferrell, Billy Porter	Phoebe Bridgers
Three Things
786	June 24, 2020	Don Cheadle	The Black Eyed Peas
Three Things, Know For Some Dough
787	June 25, 2020	Russell Crowe, Bob Behnken & Doug Hurley	Charlie Puth
VR Audience, Muppets & James Duet "With a Little Help from My Friends"

=== August ===
No.	Original release date	Guest(s)	Musical/entertainment guest(s)
788	August 10, 2020	Rachel Brosnahan	Anderson .Paak
James In "WAP" MV
789	August 11, 2020	Jamie Lee Curtis, JJ Redick	Alexander 23
Top Ten List, Mean Tweets, Thank You Notes
790	August 12, 2020	Brian Cox, Tim Minchin	Sara Bareilles
Reacting To The "WAP" MV
791	August 13, 2020	Jason Sudeikis	Tori Kelly
2 Hours Off, Can You Spot The Real Footballers?
792	August 17, 2020	Bryan Cranston	Declan McKenna
Getting A Snack
793	August 18, 2020	Joseph Gordon-Levitt	Jeremy Zucker
James Wanna See It, Drum Off
794	August 19, 2020	Danny DeVito	Chris Tomlin featuring Florida Georgia Line and Thomas Rhett
Celebrity Noses, Pet Or Pillow
795	August 20, 2020	Chuck Schumer, Lili Reinhart	Anitta
Celebrity Instagram
796	August 24, 2020	Maisie Williams	Bright Eyes
James's Birthday Gift
797	August 25, 2020	Maya Rudolph, Fred Armisen	James Bay
Nate Fernald Stamps Purchase
798	August 26, 2020	Tracee Ellis Ross	Madison Beer
Record Collection
799	August 27, 2020	Kieran Culkin	Maren Morris
James Calls Out David Blaine, The New Normal

=== September ===
No.	Original release date	Guest(s)	Musical/entertainment guest(s)
800	September 8, 2020	Hilary Swank	Sean Lennon featuring Charlotte Kemp Muhl
Like Us On..., Were You Paying Attention?
801	September 9, 2020	Gabrielle Union	Nick Cave
Summer 2020 Recap, Kidnap & Reuniting One Direction
802	September 10, 2020	Usher	Joan Jett
Usher Done With Zoom
803	September 14, 2020	Dr. Phil McGraw	Kelsea Ballerini
Dr. Phil Is A Mess
804	September 15, 2020	Rainn Wilson	Anthony Ramos
What The Hell Happened To Skype?
805	September 16, 2020	John David Washington, Michael McIntyre	Glass Animals
Honest Headlines
806	September 17, 2020	Neil Patrick Harris	Ziggy Marley featuring Ben Harper
Dua Lipa New Rules For COVID Dating
807	September 21, 2020	Alicia Keys	Alicia Keys
Tonight I Learned
808	September 22, 2020	Ken Jeong	Alicia Keys
Alicia Keys Serving
809	September 23, 2020	Sharon Stone	Alicia Keys
Spill Your Guts Or Fill Your Guts
810	September 24, 2020	Jason Schwartzman	Alicia Keys
"No One" Can Keep Alicia Keys & James From Performing, Dogs In Sunglasses
811	September 28, 2020	Jeff Daniels	Summer Walker
Jeff Daniels' Debate Advice for Joe Biden
812	September 29, 2020	Andrew Rannells	Brittany Howard
Apple Watch Hidden Features
813	September 30, 2020	Secretary of State Hillary Rodham Clinton	N/A
Trump's Debate Advisor Had A Long Night

=== October ===
No.	Original release date	Guest(s)	Musical/entertainment guest(s)
814	October 1, 2020	Tyra Banks, Evan Rachel Wood	N/A
Tyra Banks's Mom Sealed the DWTS Deal
815	October 5, 2020	Seth MacFarlane	The Jaded Hearts Club
Fenty Or One Direction
816	October 6, 2020	Whoopi Goldberg	Bishop Briggs
'Maybe I'm Immune' - Paul McCartney Parody
817	October 7, 2020	Gloria Steinem, Sally Hawkins, Craig Roberts	Conan Gray
Shred Session
818	October 8, 2020	Armie Hammer	Surfaces
Huggers In Quarantine Support Group
819	October 21, 2020	Bill Gates	The Head and the Heart
Ian Karmel Hosts Late Late Show
820	October 22, 2020	Josh Gad	The Score featuring AWOLNATION
2019 Vs. 2020, Addiction To Josh Gad
821	October 23, 2020	Jeremy Strong	SuperM
Trump's Debate Advisor
822	October 26, 2020	Aaron Sorkin	The Shins
Pit Bull Awareness Day
823	October 27, 2020	Billy Porter, David Byrne	Kane Brown
Spot The Skeleton
824	October 28, 2020	Chelsea Handler	CL
Dogs In Sunglasses
825	October 29, 2020	Vin Diesel	Jack Peñate
The Trumps May Not Know What 6 Feet Is

=== November ===
No.	Original release date	Guest(s)	Musical/entertainment guest(s)
826	November 2, 2020	Pete Buttigieg	Travis
4 Years Of Trump In 3 Minutes
827	November 4, 2020	Henry Winkler	The Kills
Honest Headlines
828	November 5, 2020	Tig Notaro	Christine and the Queens
Celebrity Instagram
829	November 6, 2020	Michael Eric Dyson, Henry Golding	Ella Mai
Golding
830	November 9, 2020	David Oyelowo	Sam Smith
Happy Days - It's Biden Time, Like Us On...
831	November 10, 2020	Thomas Middleditch	Black Pumas
Celebrity Noses
832	November 11, 2020	Max Greenfield	Niall Horan featuring Ashe
Honest Headlines
833	November 12, 2020	Cory Booker	Jack Harlow
The War On Weed
834	November 16, 2020	Will Arnett, Maria Bakalova	N/A
No Phone Scavenger Hunt
835	November 17, 2020	Melissa McCarthy, Bobby Cannavale	FITZ
Tonight I Learned
836	November 18, 2020	Alison Brie, Yuval Noah Harari	N/A
OutFOXed
837	November 19, 2020	Marc Maron	Royal Blood
Late Late LIVE Tinder
838	November 23, 2020	Michael J. Fox	BTS
Were You Paying Attention?
839	November 24, 2020	Goldie Hawn, Kurt Russell	BTS
Thanksgiving - The TikTok Musical
840	November 25, 2020	Chris Rock	Rauw Alejandro featuring J Balvin
Thanksgiving Turkey ROASTS James Corden & Reggie Watts

=== December ===
No.	Original release date	Guest(s)	Musical/entertainment guest(s)
841	December 1, 2020	John Lithgow	Gary Barlow
Can You Spot The Starbucks Cup?
842	December 2, 2020	Riz Ahmed	Bad Bunny
Staffers Take The Starbucks Challenge
843	December 3, 2020	Bryan Cranston	Rufus Wainwright
Record Collection
844	December 4, 2020	Kevin Bacon, Jamie Oliver	N/A
Jamie Oliver Makes an Ace Beef Wellington
845	December 7, 2020	Matthew McConaughey, Shawn Mendes	Shawn Mendes
Spill Your Guts Or Fill Your Guts
846	December 8, 2020	Meryl Streep, Billy Eichner	Billy Eichner
SCOTUS Doesn't Wanna Hear from Trump & Cruz
847	December 9, 2020	Jamie Dornan, Dr. Michael Eric Dyson	N/A
Trump's Latest Tactic: Hashtags & Bookies
848	December 10, 2020	Andrew Rannells	Megan Thee Stallion
Little Drummer Boy Is All Grown Up
849	December 14, 2020	Kyle Chandler	Meghan Trainor
Savage Santa
850	December 15, 2020	Keegan-Michael Key	Roddy Ricch
Briefing Santa On COVID-19
851	December 16, 2020	Nicole Kidman & Kerry Washington	Phoebe Bridgers
Last Christmas Vs. This Christmas
852	December 17, 2020	Gal Gadot	Smith & Burrows
2020 Recap, Real Or Cake?
