= List of The Late Late Show with James Corden episodes (2017) =

- No. of episodes: 148 (and 1 special)

Release
- Original network: CBS

Season chronology
- ← Previous; 2016 episodes Next → 2018 episodes

This is the list of episodes for The Late Late Show with James Corden in 2017.

== 2017 ==
=== January ===
No.	Original release date	Guest(s)	Musical/entertainment guest(s)
277	January 3, 2017	Milo Ventimiglia, Janelle Monáe	James Arthur
James Tribute To George Michael, Emoji News
278	January 4, 2017	Jim Parsons, America Ferrera	Glass Animals
Best New TV Shows In 2017, Dust In The Wind
279	January 5, 2017	Jamie Foxx, Kirsten Dunst, Zoe Saldaña	N/A
Public Domain Songs
280	January 9, 2017	Neil Patrick Harris, Sienna Miller, Tom Ford	N/A
Admiring The Hot Turkish Butcher, Broadway Riff-Off
281	January 10, 2017	Mark Wahlberg, Jeremy Renner, Joel Edgerton	Gabriel Iglesias
Side Effects May Include
282	January 11, 2017	Khloé Kardashian, Pharrell Williams, Cameron Dallas	N/A
Tonight I Learned, Spill Your Guts/Fill Your Guts
283	January 12, 2017	Bryan Cranston, Giovanni Ribisi, Jessica Biel	Jamie T
TV Roundup, Kanye West Soap Opera
284	January 17, 2017	Kate Hudson, Anders Holm, Aaron Taylor-Johnson	Jim James
Honest Headlines, Toddlerography
285	January 18, 2017	Vin Diesel, Deepika Padukone	OK Go
Where's Reggie
286	January 19, 2017	Chris Hardwick, Nina Dobrev	Fitz and the Tantrums
Magic Trick, Nuzzle Whaaa?
287	January 30, 2017	Drew Carey, Keke Palmer	Local Natives
Post-Ban Trip To LAX, No Scrubs
288	January 31, 2017	Johnny Galecki, Sting	N/A
Side Effects May Include, Battle of the Singing Waiters

=== February ===
No.	Original release date	Guest(s)	Musical/entertainment guest(s)
289	February 1, 2017	Aaron Paul, Jermaine Fowler, Jenny Slate	N/A
Tonight I Learned, Price Is Right Redemption
290	February 2, 2017	Mindy Kaling, Bill Paxton	Queen + Adam Lambert
Front Man Battle, Stage 56 Bar Tricks
291	February 13, 2017	Ice Cube, Ike Barinholtz	Steve Aoki & Louis Tomlinson
Audience Q&A, Rooftop Basketball
292	February 14, 2017	Katherine Heigl, Lars Ulrich, Andrew Rannells	Lisa Hannigan
Emoji News
293	February 15, 2017	Laura Dern, Zach Galifianakis	Glen Hansard
Like Us On, Visiting Super Bowl LI
294	February 16, 2017	Matt Damon, Will Arnett	Bibi Bourelly
Visiting The Grammy's
295	February 21, 2017	Trevor Noah, Laverne Cox, Luke Wilson	Noah Cyrus
Seated Ballet
296	February 22, 2017	Bob Odenkirk, David Oyelowo	Bebe Rexha
Side Effects May Include, The Zach Galifianakis Problem
297	February 23, 2017	Jordan Peele, Nick Kroll	Ryan Adams
Remembering a Break-up Changes James's Mood, Thr33way
298	February 27, 2017	Chris O'Donnell, Sara Bareilles	Linkin Park featuring Kiiara
La La Land' Audition, Emoji News
299	February 28, 2017	Michelle Monaghan, Bradley Whitford	London Grammar
Honest Headlines, Hidden Talents

=== March ===
No.	Original release date	Guest(s)	Musical/entertainment guest(s)
300	March 1, 2017	Hayden Panettiere, Shirley MacLaine	Myq Kaplan
Celebrity Noses, Taller or Shorter
301	March 2, 2017	Idris Elba, Jessica Lange, Scott Foley	Earl St. Clair
Behind The Curtain
302	March 6, 2017	Patrick Stewart, Rupert Grint, Dan Stevens	New Kids on the Block
Tonight I Learned
303	March 7, 2017	Alec Baldwin, Kerry Washington	José González
White House Tourists Review Donald Trump's Appearance, None Of The Above
304	March 8, 2017	Samuel L. Jackson, January Jones	Sting
The Late Late Show Without Women, Samuel L. Jackson Role Call
305	March 9, 2017	John Goodman, Jack Hanna	Spoon
Spot The Difference
306	March 13, 2017	Leighton Meester, Dominic Monaghan, Blake Griffin	Judah & the Lion
Blake Griffin's New Life Coach
307	March 14, 2017	Gillian Jacobs, Jerrod Carmichael	Lea Michele
Late Late Show Record Collection, Were You Paying Attention?
308	March 15, 2017	Reese Witherspoon, Tony Goldwyn	Andy Shauf
Trump's Tax Returns, Crosswalk The Musical, Wig Little Lies
309	March 16, 2017	Vanessa Hudgens, Thomas Sadoski	Lil Rel Howery
Corporate Acronyms, Emoji News
310	March 20, 2017	Abigail Spencer, Ben Platt, Tim Minchin	Take That
Donald: The Musical
311	March 21, 2017	Allison Williams, Darren Criss	The Band Perry
Donald: The Musical Alternative Titles/Like Us On, Audience Q&A
312	March 22, 2017	Josh Gad, Judy Greer	Maggie Rogers
Crashing The Late Late Show, James Discusses The Westminster Attack, Behind The Curtain
313	March 23, 2017	Terrence Howard, Jenna Elfman	Nicole Scherzinger
Reggie's Birthday Cake, Honest Headlines, Fake Or Flop
314	March 27, 2017	JJ Redick, Scott Bakula, Pete Holmes	MisterWives
Tonight I Learned, Basketball Or Cake
315	March 28, 2017	Kristen Bell, Cheryl Hines	Little Mix
Side Effects May Include, Up Where We Belong
316	March 29, 2017	Victoria Beckham, Jessica Chastain, Lisa Kudrow	N/A
Love Triangle - Salt Bae Vs. Sax Bae, Flinch
317	March 30, 2017	Adam Scott, Michael Peña	Bea Miller
Let Me Break It Down: March 2017, Mannequin

=== April ===
No.	Original release date	Guest(s)	Musical/entertainment guest(s)
318	April 3, 2017	Stephen Curry, Chris Paul, Steve Nash	N/A
Basketball Rap & Mascot Party, Live at the NCAA Tournament Final, Dance & Kiss Cams, Stephen Curry Has a New Life Coach, Human Basketball Hoop
319	April 4, 2017	Claire Danes, Christine Baranski, Jack McBrayer	Zara Larsson featuring Ty Dolla $ign
Katy Perry Soap Opera
320	April 5, 2017	Demi Lovato, Charlie Hunnam, Rupert Friend	N/A
Divas Riff-Off
321	April 17, 2017	Kumail Nanjiani, Riz Ahmed	Sabrina Carpenter
Like Us On..., Drop the Mic
322	April 18, 2017	Shania Twain, Tyrese Gibson, Whitney Cummings	Sabrina Carpenter
Tonight I Learned, Behind The Curtain
323	April 19, 2017	Adam Sandler, Kevin James	Bastille
Side Effects May Include..., Youth Soccer Dad Battle w/ Kevin James and Adam Sandler
324	April 20, 2017	Anne Hathaway, Armie Hammer, Rob Delaney	6LACK
Soundtrack to a Rom Com w/ Anne Hathaway
325	April 24, 2017	Jason Schwartzman, Nicole Richie, Geoffrey Rush	Depeche Mode
Celebrity Instagram
326	April 25, 2017	Amanda Peet, Kal Penn, Max Minghella	Kaleo
Were You Paying Attention?
327	April 26, 2017	Ludacris, Elisabeth Moss, Eugenio Derbez	The Head and the Heart
FaceApp, Flinch
328	April 27, 2017	Kurt Russell, Thomas Middleditch	Russell Howard
Breaking Down April 2017, Escape From Kurt Russell

=== May ===
No.	Original release date	Guest(s)	Musical/entertainment guest(s)
329	May 1, 2017	Joel McHale, Jake Johnson	Lisa Hannigan
Honest Headlines, None Of The Above
330	May 2, 2017	Liev Schreiber, Kelly Osbourne	Ocean Park Standoff
Dogs In Sunglasses, Emoji News
331	May 3, 2017	Jane Fonda, Lily Tomlin, Taylor Schilling	Ryan Adams
Tonight I Learned, Mystery Door
332	May 4, 2017	Jennifer Lopez, Terry Crews, Justin Theroux	Green Day
Record Collection
333	May 8, 2017	Caitlyn Jenner, Michael Weatherly	LP
James Has Eyes For France's Emmanuel Macron, Audience Q&A
334	May 9, 2017	Eva Longoria, Sam Richardson, Paul Feig	N/A
Side Effects May Include, Nuzzle Whaaa?
335	May 10, 2017	Betty White, Ben McKenzie, Amy Brenneman	Conor Oberst
Mom Face-Off
336	May 11, 2017	Goldie Hawn, Kevin Bacon	Dreamcar
Magic Trick, Celebrity Noses
337	May 15, 2017	Harry Styles, Aaron Taylor-Johnson	Harry Styles
Flinch
338	May 16, 2017	Ice Cube, Jason Derulo	Harry Styles
Side Effects May Include, James's New Girlfriend
339	May 17, 2017	Ewan McGregor, Billy Crudup	Harry Styles
EXPLOSIVE Guest Lineup, Singing Problem
340	May 18, 2017	Benicio del Toro, Diane Lane, Michael Fassbender	Harry Styles
Harry Styles Carpool Karaoke, Heineken Commercial Parody
Special	May 22, 2017	N/A	N/A
Best of Carpool Karaoke (primetime special). Toddlerography, Like Us On, Carpool Karaoke with Katy Perry
341	May 22, 2017	Lionel Richie, Jenna Dewan Tatum	N/A
Carpool Karaoke Replay with Katy Perry
342	May 23, 2017	Jim Carrey, Al Madrigal, Andrew Santino	Erik Griffin
Dogs In Sunglasses
343	May 24, 2017	Ed Helms, Priyanka Chopra, Kaya Scodelario	Paramore
Stuck On The Ceiling
344	May 25, 2017	Orlando Bloom, Zac Efron, Zach Woods	Sigrid
The IT Guys

=== June ===
No.	Original release date	Guest(s)	Musical/entertainment guest(s)
345	June 5, 2017	Gordon Ramsay, Michael Strahan	N/A
Touring Central Hall #LateLateLondon Set, Drive To LAX, Flight To London
346	June 6, 2017	Nicole Kidman, Kit Harington	Ed Sheeran
Celebrating London, Crosswalk The Musical - Mary Poppins With Ben Kingsley, Carpool Karaoke with Ed Sheeran: Note: This episode was filmed in London, U.K.
347	June 7, 2017	Tom Cruise, Jennifer Hudson, Russell Brand, Anthony Joshua	Kings of Leon
Tom's Cruise On The River Thames Corden, Drop The Mic: Note: This episode was filmed in London, U.K.
348	June 8, 2017	David Beckham, Emily Blunt	Harry Styles
The Phone Is For You, Soundtrack To Romeo & Juliet, The Next James Bond: Note: This episode was filmed in London, U.K.
349	June 12, 2017	Salma Hayek, Sofia Coppola	Linkin Park
Take A Break, 1860s Girls Gone Wild
350	June 13, 2017	Jane Krakowski, Kate Mara, Lily James	Iggy Azalea
Facetime With Kevin Durant, Flinch
351	June 14, 2017	Fred Armisen, Tituss Burgess, Edgar Wright	Gavin DeGraw
Emoji News
352	June 15, 2017	Jamie Foxx, Ansel Elgort	Beth Ditto
Riff-Off
353	June 19, 2017	Ginnifer Goodwin, Eddie Izzard, Jillian Bell	Jason Derulo
None Of The Above
354	June 20, 2017	Chelsea Handler, Dean Norris	Khalid
HIV/AIDS Council Participants Resigning, Were You Paying Attention?
355	June 21, 2017	Seth Rogen, Will Arnett, Alison Brie	N/A
Record Collection
356	June 22, 2017	Dominic Cooper, Laura Haddock	N/A
Like Us On, Mystery Pizza Box

=== July ===
No.	Original release date	Guest(s)	Musical/entertainment guest(s)
357	July 24, 2017	Anna Faris, Mark Hamill, Jenny Slate	Foster the People
Guest Lineup Too Good To Be True, I Am Your Father
358	July 25, 2017	Julie Chen, Edie Falco	Maz Jobrani
Usher Carpool Karaoke
359	July 26, 2017	Al Gore, Laura Linney	Mr Eazi
L-G-B-T Musical, Honest Headlines, Celebrity Noses
360	July 27, 2017	Matt Bomer, Niecy Nash	Julia Michaels
Like Us On, Visit To Los Angeles School of Gymnastics
361	July 31, 2017	Chris Bosh, Mark Duplass, Jay Duplass	N/A
Dogs in Sunglasses, Emoji News

=== August ===
No.	Original release date	Guest(s)	Musical/entertainment guest(s)
362	August 1, 2017	Gordon Ramsay, Brendan Gleeson	Maggie Rogers
Tonight I Learned, MasterChef Junior Junior
363	August 2, 2017	Kate Beckinsale, Adam Scott	Poppy
Behind The Curtain
364	August 7, 2017	Anthony Mackie, Lily Collins	Børns
Obsessed With Sharknado 5, & None Of The Above
365	August 8, 2017	John Boyega, Jeffrey Tambor	Rag'n'Bone Man
Preview Of "Carpool Karaoke: The Series"
366	August 9, 2017	Elizabeth Olsen, Maya Rudolph	James Blunt
Audience Q&A, 'The Boyega Is Mine' - Brandy/Monica Parody
367	August 10, 2017	Aubrey Plaza, Jeremy Renner, Chris O'Dowd	Russ
Side Effects May Include
368	August 14, 2017	Billy Eichner, Riley Keough	Royal Blood
Drop the Mic
369	August 15, 2017	Lin-Manuel Miranda, Nikolaj Coster-Waldau	N/A
Emoji News
370	August 16, 2017	Harry Connick Jr., Willem Dafoe, Emma Bunton	Daniel Caesar
Floyd Mayweather's New Hype Man, Song Of The Summer About The Summer
371	August 17, 2017	Julia Louis-Dreyfus, Ray Romano	Billy Idol
James Corden's Message To Barcelona, Crosswalk The Musical

=== September ===
No.	Original release date	Guest(s)	Musical/entertainment guest(s)
372	September 5, 2017	Kathy Bates, Ed Helms	Julian McCullough
Emoji News
373	September 6, 2017	Jim Gaffigan, James Van Der Beek	Liam Payne
Boy Bands v. Solo Artists Riff-Off
374	September 7, 2017	Dana Carvey, Lake Bell	The All-American Rejects
Tonight I Learned, Dogs In Sunglasses
375	September 8, 2017	Taron Egerton, Damian Lillard	N/A
Superfan Ruins Damian Lillard Interview, Reggie's Hobbies
376	September 11, 2017	Christian Slater, Adrianne Palicki	Circus 1903
Gwyneth Paltrow Interrupts Monologue, Kick It Out/Bring It Back
377	September 12, 2017	Mindy Kaling, Olivia Munn	Fifth Harmony
Honest Headlines, Flinch
378	September 13, 2017	Michael Keaton, Dylan O'Brien	Superfruit
Celebrity Instagram, The "IT" Department
379	September 14, 2017	Andrea Riseborough, Jenna Fischer	Jesus Trejo
Side Effects May Include With Stephen Colbert, Nick Jonas Is New Intern
380	September 18, 2017	Lonzo Ball, Sonequa Martin-Green, Robert Winston	N/A
Magic Trick, Taller Or Shorter
381	September 19, 2017	Alicia Vikander, Luke Wilson, Zach Woods	Sir Sly
James Wants To Be Lara Croft
382	September 20, 2017	Mayim Bialik, Susan Kelechi Watson	Billie Eilish
Carpool Karaoke with Foo Fighters
383	September 21, 2017	Judi Dench, Kyle MacLachlan	Kasabian
'Twin Peaks' Red Room, Lawrence O'Donnell's Freak Out
384	September 25, 2017	Jeremy Piven, America Ferrera, Lior Suchard	N/A
Tonight I Learned
385	September 26, 2017	Channing Tatum, Adam Scott, Diego Luna	N/A
Emoji News
386	September 27, 2017	Billie Lourd, Maggie Gyllenhaal, Tim Roth	Macklemore
Magic Mike Live
387	September 28, 2017	Don Johnson, Minnie Driver	Barns Courtney
Apple Watch Hidden Figures, Wheelin' N Dealin' - Spin for Cash!

=== October ===
No.	Original release date	Guest(s)	Musical/entertainment guest(s)
388	October 2, 2017	Jeff Goldblum, Jay Pharoah, Elizabeth Gillies	The Shins
James acknowledges the 2017 Las Vegas shooting, None Of The Above
389	October 3, 2017	Julia Roberts, Ben Schwartz	Shania Twain
Take A Break
390	October 4, 2017	Cheryl Hines, Mark Feuerstein	N/A
3 Minutes Of Christmas, Julia Roberts Role Call
391	October 5, 2017	Michael Fassbender, Ana de Armas, Jack Hanna	N/A
Like Us On, Audience Q&A
392	October 9, 2017	Jeff Bridges, David Boreanaz	Liam Gallagher
Jeopardy's Austin Rogers Is James Corden's New Bae, 'SEAL Team' for James' Billboard
393	October 10, 2017	Jennifer Connelly, Jason Alexander, Mark Consuelos	N/A
Miley Cyrus Carpool Karaoke
394	October 11, 2017	Josh Gad, Rachel Bloom, Michelle Dockery	Charlie Puth
Spill Your Guts Or Fill Your Guts
395	October 12, 2017	Luke Evans, Usher	Lindsey Buckingham & Christine McVie
Riff Off, SWAT Team Fail
396	October 23, 2017	Gabrielle Union, Method Man	Sabrina Claudio
Method Man Is Over Rhyming, Emoji News
397	October 24, 2017	Cedric the Entertainer, Usain Bolt	Jesus Trejo
Dogs In Sunglasses, James Challenges Usain Bolt To ALL The Games
398	October 25, 2017	Anna Wintour, Zac Posen	Everything Everything
UNBELIEVABLE List Of Upcoming Guests, Spill Your Guts Or Fill Your Guts
399	October 26, 2017	Dustin Hoffman, Kenneth Branagh, Jordan Spieth	N/A
Record Collection, Target Practice
400	October 30, 2017	Miles Teller, Whitney Cummings	Fergie
Drop The Mic
401	October 31, 2017	Allison Janney, Ludacris, Rep. Nancy Pelosi	Iliza Shlesinger
Politics At The Pub, Reggie Always Keeps Scaring James

=== November ===
No.	Original release date	Guest(s)	Musical/entertainment guest(s)
402	November 1, 2017	Mila Kunis, Jim Parsons	N/A
Sam Smith Carpool Karaoke
403	November 2, 2017	Kristen Bell, Dianna Agron	Gary Clark Jr.
Thor: Ragnarok 4D
404	November 6, 2017	Matt LeBlanc, William H. Macy, Hailey Baldwin	Weezer
James acknowledges the Sutherland Springs church shooting, Nuzzle Whaaa?
405	November 7, 2017	Rainn Wilson, Jack Whitehall, Novak Djokovic	Ty Dolla $ign
Celebrity Noses, Target Practice
406	November 8, 2017	Neil deGrasse Tyson, Saoirse Ronan, The Cast of Stranger Things	Billy Corgan
The Upside Downs
407	November 9, 2017	Gael García Bernal, Jason Momoa	Sam Smith
Side Effects May Include, Animals Riding Animals
408	November 13, 2017	Jason Segel, Seth Rogen	Jaden Smith
Famine In Yemen, Were You Paying Attention
409	November 14, 2017	Emmy Rossum, January Jones	N/A
Pink Carpool Karaoke
410	November 15, 2017	Kim Kardashian West, Ludacris	Amy Shark
Celebrity Instagram, Spill Your Guts Or Fill Your Guts
411	November 16, 2017	Debra Messing, Taran Killam, Sam Rockwell	Bebe Rexha featuring Florida Georgia Line
None Of The Above
412	November 20, 2017	Kate Bosworth, Shemar Moore	Portugal. The Man
Mystery Pizza Box
413	November 21, 2017	Chris Hardwick, Camila Mendes	Rag'n'Bone Man
Face Your Father
414	November 22, 2017	Krysten Ritter, Josh Hutcherson	N/A
Late Late LIVE Tinder
415	November 29, 2017	Armie Hammer, Juno Temple	Charlie Puth
Kelly Clarkson Carpool Karaoke
416	November 30, 2017	Bryan Cranston, Timothée Chalamet	BTS
Honest Headlines, Flinch

=== December ===
No.	Original release date	Guest(s)	Musical/entertainment guest(s)
417	December 4, 2017	Denis Leary, Bob Odenkirk	Stereophonics
Bryan Cranston Is The Elf on the Shelf
418	December 5, 2017	Matthew Broderick, Gina Rodriguez, Christopher Meloni	N/A
Omarosa's White House Job, Christmas Giveaway
419	December 6, 2017	Kristen Wiig, Seth MacFarlane	Romesh Ranganathan
Kristen Wiig Struggles with 'Hallelujah'
420	December 7, 2017	Morgan Freeman, Kobe Bryant, Glen Keane	N/A
Take A Break
421	December 11, 2017	James Franco, Dave Franco	Hanson
Emoji News, Santa Claus Is Comin' To Town' Carpool Karaoke
422	December 12, 2017	Owen Wilson, Jane Krakowski, Joel Edgerton	Seal
James Corden is out due to the birth of his newborn daughter, and is replaced by Harry Styles. Dogs In Sunglasses
423	December 13, 2017	Dwayne Johnson, Jack Black	Tim Minchin
James Corden is still out due to the birth of his newborn daughter, and is replaced by Bryan Cranston. Side Effects May Include, Animals Riding Animals
424	December 14, 2017	Hugh Jackman, John Cena	N/A
Crosswalk the Musical on Broadway
