= List of The Late Late Show with James Corden episodes (2018) =

- No. of episodes: 148 (and 1 special)

Release
- Original network: CBS

Season chronology
- ← Previous; 2017 episodes Next → 2019 episodes

This is the list of episodes for The Late Late Show with James Corden in 2018.

== 2018 ==
=== January ===
No.	Original release date	Guest(s)	Musical/entertainment guest(s)
425	January 8, 2018	Connie Britton, Bradley Whitford, Jamie Bell	Cirque du Soleil LUZIA
Steve Bannon & Donald Trump Almost Had It All, Future Guest Lineup
426	January 9, 2018	Gillian Anderson, Sally Hawkins	Daya
Audience Q&A, When Your Catfish Is Actually A Fish
427	January 10, 2018	Judd Apatow, Aaron Sorkin	Rachel Platten
Emoji News, Steve Bannon Needs a Job
428	January 11, 2018	Tyra Banks, Matt Smith	N/A
Late Late LIVE Tinder
429	January 16, 2018	Annette Bening, Rachel Brosnahan	Royal Blood
Kangaroo Bae, None of the Above
430	January 17, 2018	Kyra Sedgwick, Ed Helms, Lena Waithe	Stefflon Don
Steve Bannon Faces a Lie Dector, Like Us On...
431	January 18, 2018	Michael Peña, O'Shea Jackson Jr.	N/A
Melania Trump Sings 'Part of Your World' (Little Mermaid Parody), Apple Watch Hidden Figures
432	January 29, 2018	Lily Tomlin, Luke Evans, Sarah Hyland	Sam Smith
Discussing Last Night's Grammy's, Honest Headlines
433	January 30, 2018	Helen Mirren, J. K. Simmons	N/A
Dogs in Sunglasses, Drop the Mic
434	January 31, 2018	Martin Short, Lisa Kudrow	Fall Out Boy
Recap of January 2018, Animals Riding Animals

=== February ===
No.	Original release date	Guest(s)	Musical/entertainment guest(s)
435	February 1, 2018	Jamie Dornan, Pete Holmes	Rich Brian
Visiting the Grammy's
436	February 5, 2018	Margot Robbie, Domhnall Gleeson	Lo Moon
Behind the Scenes of "Peter Rabbit"
437	February 6, 2018	Willem Dafoe, Michelle Monaghan	MAX
Fifty Shades Of Corden, Side Effects May Include
438	February 7, 2018	Meghan Trainor, Guillermo del Toro	Jamie Lee
Celebrity Instagram, Meghan Trainor Music Video – Speed It Up, Slow It Down
439	February 8, 2018	Taylor Kitsch, Dan Stevens, Ron Funches	N/A
James Obsession with "The Assassination of Gianni Versace", Stage 56 Bar Tricks
440	February 20, 2018	Zach Galifianakis, Tessa Thompson	The Neighbourhood
James Acknowledges the Stoneman Douglas High School shooting, Emoji News
441	February 21, 2018	Allison Janney, Joel McHale	Liam Gallagher
Dealing with Persistent Heckler, Mystery Door
442	February 22, 2018	Gary Oldman, Greta Gerwig	Bruno Major
Half Court Swish
443	February 26, 2018	Johnny Galecki, Steve Harvey	Nate Fernald
Honest Headlines, Audience Q&A
444	February 27, 2018	Chloe Kim, Gordon Ramsay	Nate Fernald
Spill Your Guts/Fill Your Guts
445	February 28, 2018	Elton John, Sharon Stone	Vance Joy
Celebrity Noses, James That Tune

=== March ===
No.	Original release date	Guest(s)	Musical/entertainment guest(s)
446	March 1, 2018	Camila Morrone, Robert Plant	N/A
Master Chef Senior, The Tragedy of The Price Is Right's Cliff Hangers
447	March 5, 2018	Jeff Goldblum, Marlon Wayans, Jack Hanna	Albert Hammond Jr.
Upcoming Guest Lineup
448	March 6, 2018	Eric Bana, Padma Lakshmi, Anders Holm	N/A
Challenging Los Angeles FC to a Soccer Match
449	March 7, 2018	Lindsey Vonn, Jim Gaffigan	Albert Hammond Jr.
Tonight I Learned, Pile High Club
450	March 8, 2018	Charlize Theron, David Oyelowo, Joel Edgerton	Derren Brown
Derren Brown Has James Eat Glass
451	March 12, 2018	Oprah Winfrey, Reese Witherspoon, Mindy Kaling	N/A
'A Wrinkle in Time' 4D
452	March 13, 2018	Patton Oswalt, Darren Criss	ZZ Ward featuring Fitz
The Assassination of Gianni Versace' Recap
453	March 14, 2018	Tony Hale, Jason Schwartzman	N/A
Trump to Robert Mueller: 'It Wasn't Me' (w/ Shaggy). Magician Blake Vogt.
454	March 15, 2018	Alicia Vikander, Walton Goggins	James Blunt
Honest Headlines
455	March 19, 2018	RuPaul, Kumail Nanjiani, Jenny Slate	Craig David
Cell Phone Profile
456	March 20, 2018	Dakota Fanning, Will Forte	Iggy Azalea
First Ad for Trump's Anti-Drug Campaign, Were You Paying Attention?
457	March 21, 2018	Drew Barrymore, John Boyega	Weezer
Like Us On, Spill Your Guts or Fill Your Guts
458	March 22, 2018	Jennifer Garner, Freddie Highmore, Eddie Kaye Thomas	Adam Cayton-Holland
Emoji News
459	March 26, 2018	Zachary Quinto, Rupert Friend	Ben Harper & Charlie Musselwhite
Donald Trump 5-Day Forecast, Animals Riding Animals
460	March 27, 2018	Adam DeVine, Zoey Deutch	The Voidz
'Amazing Race' Audition Tape
461	March 28, 2018	Hilary Swank, Zach Woods	Shawn Mendes
Late Late Show Shawn Mendes June 4th Announcement, Flinch
462	March 29, 2018	Helen Hunt, Ben Schwartz, Chris O'Dowd	The Slow Mo Guys
BREAKING NEWS

=== April ===
No.	Original release date	Guest(s)	Musical/entertainment guest(s)
463	April 9, 2018	Tracy Morgan, Ike Barinholtz	Weezer
None of the Above
464	April 10, 2018	Reba McEntire, Lucy Hale, Glenn Howerton	Kelsea Ballerini
Dogs in Sunglasses
465	April 11, 2018	Neil Patrick Harris, Dave Franco	Andy Woodhull
A Quiet Late Late, Line of Duty
466	April 12, 2018	Shaquille O'Neal, Victoria Beckham	Jamiroquai
Emoji News
467	April 16, 2018	Jeff Daniels, Tracee Ellis Ross	Cam
Side Effects May Include, Audience Q&A
468	April 17, 2018	Jason Sudeikis, Ice Cube	Fall Out Boy
Tonight I Learned, Ships Ahoy
469	April 18, 2018	Christina Hendricks, Luke Hemsworth, Abigail Spencer	Aparna Nancherla
Shaqnado
470	April 19, 2018	Busy Philipps, Eugenio Derbez, Emily VanCamp	Bishop Briggs
Apple Watch Hidden Features
Special	April 23, 2018	N/A	Christina Aguilera
Best of Carpool Karaoke (primetime special). Crosswalk the Musical, Carpool Karaoke with Christina Aguilera
471	April 23, 2018	Evan Rachel Wood, Don Johnson	Pentatonix
Carpool Karaoke Replay with Christina Aguilera
472	April 24, 2018	Anthony Mackie, Judy Greer	Snow Patrol
Celebrity Instagram, Reggie Watts' Taskmaster
473	April 25, 2018	Mark Ruffalo, Mackenzie Davis, Chelsea Clinton	N/A
Earth Day Tips
474	April 26, 2018	Claire Foy, Method Man	Michael Palascak
Avengers: Infinity War Cast Tours
475	April 30, 2018	Benedict Cumberbatch	Kylie Minogue
Kanye Westworld Is Malfunctioning, Animals Riding Animals

=== May ===
No.	Original release date	Guest(s)	Musical/entertainment guest(s)
476	May 1, 2018	Elizabeth Olsen, David Tennant	Anne-Marie
April 2018 Recap, Benedict Cumberbatch & James Corden Can't Share a Stage
477	May 2, 2018	Will Ferrell, Eva Longoria	Jo Koy
Record Collection, Target Practice with Los Angeles FC
478	May 3, 2018	David Duchovny, Henry Winkler	Billy Corgan
iPhone X Hidden Features, Late Late Show Derby
479	May 7, 2018	Zach Braff, Jada Pinkett Smith	Portugal. The Man
Honest Headlines, Emoji News
480	May 8, 2018	Melissa McCarthy, Chris Parnell	Wallows
Next Week's Guest Lineup, Stage 56 Bar Tricks
481	May 9, 2018	Heidi Klum, Thandie Newton, Zlatan Ibrahimović	Alice Merton
The Universe's Best Fortune Teller
482	May 10, 2018	Bill Hader, Gabrielle Union	X Ambassadors
Hot For Lost In Space Reboot, Mom Face-Off
483	May 14, 2018	Zooey Deschanel, John Mulaney	Arctic Monkeys
Young James Singing Seinfeld Theme
484	May 15, 2018	Hank Azaria, Kyle MacLachlan	George Ezra
Like Us On..., Were You Paying Attention?
485	May 16, 2018	Diane Keaton, Andy García	James Acaster
Tonight I Learned, Celebrity Noses
486	May 17, 2018	Steven Tyler, Morena Baccarin	Kacey Musgraves
Before Deadpool 2, Spill Your Guts Or Fill Your Guts
487	May 21, 2018	Audra McDonald, Billy Eichner	Thirty Seconds To Mars
Inappropriate Musicals
488	May 22, 2018	Thomas Middleditch, Dan Stevens	Ziggy Marley
Honest Headlines, None of the Above
489	May 23, 2018	Amanda Peet, Johnny Knoxville	David Blaine
Side Effects May Include
490	May 24, 2018	Ted Danson, Natalie Dormer	Jessie J
Adam Levine Carpool Karaoke

=== June ===
No.	Original release date	Guest(s)	Musical/entertainment guest(s)
491	June 4, 2018	Holly Hunter, Mariska Hargitay	Shawn Mendes
Parking in James Corden's Spot, Carpool Karaoke with Shawn Mendes
492	June 5, 2018	Lucy Liu, Mandy Patinkin	Shawn Mendes
Shawn Mendes Takes Over the Monologue, Wheel of Insane Graphics
493	June 6, 2018	Sterling K. Brown, James Marsden, Brian Tyree Henry	Shawn Mendes & Julia Michaels
Cover Battle
494	June 7, 2018	Sandra Bullock, Sarah Paulson, Awkwafina	Shawn Mendes
Ocean's 8 Cast Can't Say Goodbye
495	June 11, 2018	Draymond Green, Hilary Duff, Sam Richardson	Shania Twain
Insane Guest Lineup, Emoji News
496	June 12, 2018	Sean "Diddy" Combs, Ashton Kutcher	BTS
Drop the Mic
497	June 13, 2018	Bob Odenkirk, Sarah Silverman	N/A
Honest Headlines, Queer Eye Makeover
498	June 14, 2018	Isla Fisher, Jeremy Renner	Romesh Ranganathan
Dad Face-Off
499	June 18, 2018	Orlando Bloom, Cate Blanchett	Niall Horan
Hall Pass with Orlando Bloom, Crosswalk the Musical – The Work of Andrew Lloyd Webber
500	June 19, 2018	Cher, Phoebe Waller-Bridge	N/A
Take a Break – The Savoy, Spill Your Guts or Fill Your Guts, England Recruits American Supporters
501	June 20, 2018	Damian Lewis, Ruth Wilson, Chris Pratt	N/A
Surprising Londoners with Free Tickets, Chris Pratt & James Corden Go on a Hike, James Addresses "Human Decency Issue" at the US Mexico Border, Pimp My Glide
502	June 21, 2018	Foo Fighters, Sophie Turner, Paul McCartney	N/A
Carpool Karaoke with Paul McCartney

=== July ===
No.	Original release date	Guest(s)	Musical/entertainment guest(s)
503	July 23, 2018	Dominic Cooper, Rebecca Ferguson	Grace VanderWaal
Mystery Pizza Box, Shock Therapy Quiz
504	July 24, 2018	Tom Cruise, Angela Bassett	Kacey Musgraves
Take a Break – with The Backstreet Boys.
505	July 25, 2018	David Spade, Simon Pegg	Now United
Reviewing The Proposal, Audience Q&A.
506	July 26, 2018	Debra Messing, Nick Offerman	Elon Gold
James Skydives with Tom Cruise.
507	July 30, 2018	Mandy Moore, Jenna Dewan	Lisa Best
Celebrity Instagram
508	July 31, 2018	Curtis "50 Cent" Jackson, Hayley Atwell	Snow Patrol
James Addresses the Challenges of Producing Comedy, Stage 56 Bar Tricks

=== August ===
No.	Original release date	Guest(s)	Musical/entertainment guest(s)
509	August 1, 2018	Mila Kunis, Christian Slater	PrettyMuch
Emoji News, PrettyMuch: Summer on You
510	August 6, 2018	Keanu Reeves, Peter Stormare	LANY
Dogs in Sunglasses, Manchester United vs. James Corden & 100 Kids
511	August 7, 2018	Kris Jenner, Ben Schwartz	N/A
Tonight I Learned, Spill Your Guts/Fill Your Guts
512	August 8, 2018	Ray Romano, Chloë Grace Moretz	Lord Huron
Honest Headlines, Face Your Father
513	August 9, 2018	Tig Notaro, Bo Burnham, John Cho	Flora Cash
James Wanna See It
514	August 13, 2018	Rob Reiner, Emily Mortimer, John David Washington	N/A
Hideen Apple Watch Features, Soundtrack to Titanic with Ariana Grande
515	August 14, 2018	Mayim Bialik, Ben Simmons	Florida Georgia Line
Paul McCartney Visits the Late Late Show Office, Nuzzle Whaaa?
516	August 15, 2018	Ariana Grande, Vanessa Hudgens, Matt Smith	N/A
Carpool Karaoke with Ariana Grande
517	August 16, 2018	Allison Janney, Judd Apatow	Death Cab for Cutie
Robert Mueller's Indictment Song, Lizzie & The Duke

=== September ===
No.	Original release date	Guest(s)	Musical/entertainment guest(s)
518	September 4, 2018	Alice Eve, Mark Duplass, Wyatt Cenac	Dorothy
What Was In James Corden's Birthday Cake, Breaking Down Summer 2018
519	September 5, 2018	Rob Corddry, Paula Abdul	N/A
Like Us On, Animals Riding Animals
520	September 6, 2018	Blake Griffin, Paul Feig	Demetri Martin
Discussing the News (& Not Watching Cat Videos), Basketball or Cake?
521	September 7, 2018	Cher, William H. Macy	N/A
Musical Chers, #LetCordenKick
522	September 10, 2018	Rob Lowe, Leighton Meester	Poppy
Were You Paying Attention?
523	September 11, 2018	Joe Manganiello, Jennifer Love Hewitt	Why Don't We
Late, Late Live Tinder
524	September 12, 2018	Alison Brie, Keegan-Michael Key, Prof. Robert Winston	N/A
You'll Love It, Honest Headlines
525	September 13, 2018	Mel B, Dr. Phil McGraw, Olivia Munn	Good Charlotte
Dr. Phil Rocks Out With Good Charlotte
526	September 18, 2018	Tracey Ullman, Henry Golding	Madison Beer
James Can't Impress Henry Golding's Crazy Rich Mom (Michelle Yeoh), Emoji News
527	September 19, 2018	Kaley Cuoco, Joel McHale	Gaz Coombes
Drake Lyrics Soap Opera, Dogs In Sunglasses
528	September 20, 2018	Joan Collins, Johnny Galecki	Badflower
Predator Is Desperate for New Acting Roles, Celebrity Noses
529	September 24, 2018	Tiffany Haddish, Jay Hernandez	Tori Kelly
James Wanna See It
530	September 25, 2018	Rupert Everett, Rob Riggle, Ben Howard	N/A
Singing Telegrams
531	September 26, 2018	Max Greenfield, Sophie Turner	Josh Groban
The Biggest 'Baby Shark' Ever
532	September 27, 2018	Damon Wayans Jr., Gina Rodriguez	Mark Normand
Best Friend's Loyalty

=== October ===
No.	Original release date	Guest(s)	Musical/entertainment guest(s)
533	October 1, 2018	Chris Sullivan, Lil Rel Howery	Sabrina Carpenter
Audience Q&A
534	October 2, 2018	Riz Ahmed, Mary Elizabeth Winstead	Phosphorescent
We Are Probably All Going to Die' w/ Eric Idle
535	October 3, 2018	Jeff Bridges, Jenny Slate	Arctic Monkeys
Take A Break
536	October 4, 2018	Beth Behrs, Taran Killam	Boy George
Spittin' Venom, Celebrity Instagram
537	October 15, 2018	Jon Hamm, Judy Greer	N/A
Spill Your Guts or Fill Your Guts
538	October 16, 2018	Keira Knightley, Kathryn Hahn	Joe Zimmerman
Animals Riding Animals
539	October 17, 2018	Jamie Lee Curtis, Felix Mallard	Colin Macleod
Late Late Show Record Collection
540	October 18, 2018	Maya Rudolph, Nick Kroll	Rufus Wainwright
Honest Headlines, Making a "Halloween" Murderer
541	October 22, 2018	Dakota Johnson, Gordon Ramsay	Mike Posner
Apple Watch Hidden Features
542	October 23, 2018	Jamie Dornan, Florence Welch	Florence and the Machine
Gordan Ramsay Has Achieved Zen, Dogs in Sunglasses
543	October 24, 2018	Rosamund Pike, Zlatan Ibrahimović	Snow Patrol
Side Effects May Include, Written in the Stars
544	October 25, 2018	Amber Stevens West, Randall Park	Lenny Kravitz
The Dracula Tango
545	October 29, 2018	Carey Mulligan, Jenna Fischer	N/A
"545 Diamond Dangle", Michael Bublé Carpool Karaoke
546	October 30, 2018	Greg Kinnear, Katie Hill	N/A
James & Ariana Grande Visit an Escape Room, Were You Paying Attention?
547	October 31, 2018	Adam DeVine, Dan Stevens	KISS
Take a Break

=== November ===
No.	Original release date	Guest(s)	Musical/entertainment guest(s)
548	November 1, 2018	Rami Malek, Joel Edgerton	Mike Shinoda
Barbra Streisand Carpool Karaoke, Niall Horan Is James Corden's New Water Boy
549	November 5, 2018	Aaron Taylor-Johnson, Richard Madden	Snow Patrol
Middle Aged James Can't Rock with KISS, 2018 Election Breakdown
550	November 7, 2018	Noah Centineo, Busy Philipps, Derren Brown	Morrissey
Derren Brown Blows James Corden's Mind Again
551	November 8, 2018	Zoe Kazan, Jack Whitehall	Chloe x Halle
James Acknowledges the Thousand Oaks shooting Victims, To All the Guests I've Loved Before
552	November 12, 2018	Octavia Spencer, Jesse Williams	Pentatonix
Tonight I Learned, Emoji News
553	November 13, 2018	Justin Hartley, Dominic West	Elle King
Migos Carpool Karaoke
554	November 14, 2018	Melissa McCarthy, Richard E. Grant, Mark Wahlberg	Ian Karmel
4am Workout with Mark Wahlberg, Pick A Number
555	November 15, 2018	Maggie Gyllenhaal, Paul Dano, Diego Luna	Dylan Reynolds
Celebrity Instagram
556	November 19, 2018	Kurt Russell, Viggo Mortensen	Marc E. Bassy featuring G-Eazy
James Wanna See It
557	November 20, 2018	Eric Bana, Billie Lourd	Emily Heller
Like Us On..., Audience Q&A
558	November 21, 2018	Michael B. Jordan, Linda Cardellini, Eddie Redmayne	Death Cab For Cutie
Magic License, Late Late Show Band Giving Thanks
559	November 28, 2018	Michael Peña, Andy Serkis	Lauv & Julia Michaels
Eyes For Big Cow, Stage 56 Bar Tricks
560	November 29, 2018	Kermit the Frog, Minka Kelly, Peter Krause	Sampha
Side Effects May Include, James Pisses Off Santa Claus

=== December ===
No.	Original release date	Guest(s)	Musical/entertainment guest(s)
561	December 3, 2018	Sara Gilbert, Jeff Goldblum	N/A
None of the Above
562	December 4, 2018	Zachary Levi, Jake Johnson	N/A
Record Collection, Anders Limpar
563	December 5, 2018	Jude Law, Steve Coogan	Sam Morril
Thank u, Jeff, Honest Headlines
564	December 6, 2018	Jennifer Aniston, Dolly Parton	Leon Bridges
Celebrity Noses
565	December 10, 2018	Sean Hayes, Ice Cube	N/A
Cat Videos Can Help Us Talk About the Tough Stuff, Michael Ra-pa-pa-port
566	December 11, 2018	Ellen DeGeneres, Patrick Wilson	N/A
Starbucks Theater
567	December 12, 2018	Gisele Bündchen, Janelle Monáe	Katherine Ryan
Toddlerography, Emoji News
568	December 13, 2018	Julia Roberts, Jason Momoa, Yahya Abdul-Mateen II	She & Him
She & Him: The Christmas Song
569	December 17, 2018	Armie Hammer, Amber Heard	Middle Kids
Cardi B Carpool Karaoke
570	December 18, 2018	Gwen Stefani, Pharrell Williams	Gwen Stefani
22 Musicals in 12 Minutes w/ Lin-Manuel Miranda and Emily Blunt
571	December 19, 2018	Jennifer Lopez, Leah Remini	The Black Eyed Peas
2018 Recap, Bake Off
572	December 20, 2018	Will Ferrell, RuPaul	N/A
Christmas (Baby Please Come Home) Carpool Karaoke, Spill Your Guts or Fill Your Guts
