= List of The Late Late Show with James Corden episodes (2015) =

- No. of episodes: 125

Release
- Original network: CBS

Season chronology
- ← Previous; 2015 Guest hosts Next → 2016 episodes

This is the list of episodes for The Late Late Show with James Corden in 2015.

== 2015 ==
=== March ===
No.	Original release date	Guest(s)	Musical/entertainment guest(s)
1	March 23, 2015	Mila Kunis, Tom Hanks	N/A (James Corden)
James Corden's Journey to The Late Late Show featuring cameos by Leslie Moonves, Simon Cowell, Joel McHale, George Lopez, Lena Dunham, Billy Crystal, Eddie Redmayne, Katie Couric, Chris Rock, Chelsea Handler, Jay Leno, Allison Janney, former Governor Arnold Schwarzenegger (R-CA), Shia LaBeouf, and Meryl Streep, Every Tom Hanks Movie, James sings "Late Night Ballad".
2	March 24, 2015	Patricia Arquette, Chris Pine	Modest Mouse
Like Us On..., The Very Best of The Late Late Show DVD Vol. 1, Mystery Pizza Box, Found in the Copier: The Young and the Restless featuring Patricia Arquette & Chris Pine.
3	March 25, 2015	Will Ferrell, Kevin Hart	Leon Bridges
Carpool Karaoke featuring a cameo by Mariah Carey, Mind Link with Will Ferrell and Kevin Hart.
4	March 30, 2015	David Beckham, Claire Danes, Bob Odenkirk	N/A
Things You Never Hear, David Beckham and James Corden's New Underwear Line, Celebrity Cell Phone Profile: Beckham, Danes, Odenkirk
5	March 31, 2015	Thomas Lennon, Aubrey Plaza, Matthew Perry	Reggie Watts
Peyton “Peanut” Henderson dances with James; Margs & Mally call play-by-play for a college basketball game, Guess Google with Thomas Lennon, Aubrey Plaza & Matthew Perry, Reggie performs "A New Ending"

=== April ===
No.	Original release date	Guest(s)	Musical/entertainment guest(s)
6	April 1, 2015	Katie Couric, Jeremy Piven, Emmy Rossum	Olly Murs
Apptitude, Katie Couric April Fools Joke, Katie Couric Beats Herself Up
7	April 2, 2015	Jeff Goldblum, Rick Schwartz	Beck
Recorded at Tommy's house, Hide-and-Seek with Beck, Jeff Goldblum, Reggie Watts and Tommy
8	April 6, 2015	Dave Grohl, Jordana Brewster, Rainn Wilson	Saint Motel
(Aired at approx. 1:30am on East Coast due to NCAA Basketball Championship Game over-run) Air Jordan 7 Marvin The Martians Giveaway, Nude Model Sketching
9	April 7, 2015	Megan Mullally, Tig Notaro, Rob Corddry	N/A
Crosswalk! The Musical, Musical Chers
10	April 8, 2015	James Van Der Beek, Josh Gad	Jessie Ware
Josh Gad Singing Monologue, Celebrity Amazon Wishlist
11	April 13, 2015	Christoph Waltz, Erin Foster, Sara Foster	George Ezra
Carpool Karaoke featuring a cameo by Jennifer Hudson
12	April 14, 2015	Freida Pinto, Jon Cryer, Grace Helbig	Andy Grammer
Double Duckie, Emoji News
13	April 15, 2015	Naomi Campbell, Nick Kroll, Katharine McPhee	N/A
Kick It Out, Bring It Back; Tax Day Carols
14	April 16, 2015	Simon Cowell, Michael Douglas	Jenny Lewis
Humiliating Lies, Basic Instinct Remake
15	April 20, 2015	Rosario Dawson, Sharon Osbourne, Tony Hale	Reggie Watts
Burberry Fashion Show, Guess Who, Reggie's 4/20 Song
16	April 21, 2015	Kristen Stewart, Mark Ronson, Benjamin McKenzie	N/A
Monologue Rap, Apptitude, Reggie's Alternative Sports Field Day
17	April 22, 2015	Courteney Cox, Oscar Isaac, Joel McHale	Natalie La Rose
Celebrity Internet Search, Celebrity Cell Phone Profile
18	April 23, 2015	Jason Alexander, Beth Behrs, Kat Dennings	Estelle
Sidewalk Soulmates
19	April 27, 2015	Julie Chen, Gordon Ramsay	The Ting Tings
My Idol App, Hell's Cafeteria In "Hell's Cafeteria", Gordon Ramsay held Julie Chen's head between two slices of bread, then proceeds to ask her "What are you?" She then replies "An idiot sandwich." The scene has been viewed over 13.6 million times on YouTube and has become a viral internet meme, extensively parodied and featured on GIFs. Ramsay later made a YouTube cooking competition series titled Idiot Sandwich based on the meme.
20	April 28, 2015	Anna Faris, Tituss Burgess, David George Gordon	N/A
Kick It Out, Bring It Back
21	April 29, 2015	Russell Crowe, Kathryn Hahn, Eddie Izzard	Kodaline
CordenMitzvah Announcement
22	April 30, 2015	Idina Menzel, Kumail Nanjiani	Manic Street Preachers
Reggie's Picks, Take a Break: Mattress Store, Time Of My Life

=== May ===
No.	Original release date	Guest(s)	Musical/entertainment guest(s)
23	May 4, 2015	Whitney Cummings, Arnold Schwarzenegger	Gavin James
Mystery Pizza Box, Every Arnold Schwarzenegger Movies
24	May 5, 2015	Kaley Cuoco-Sweeting, LL Cool J	OK Go
Emoji News, Human Pinata
25	May 6, 2015	Elizabeth Olsen, Dana Carvey	N/A
Angry Bartender - Michael Caine, Psychic Predicts The 2016 Presidential Election
26	May 7, 2015	Helen Hunt, Nicholas Hoult	N/A
Apptitude, Interview On The Roof, Guess Google
27	May 11, 2015	Zoe McLellan, Mark Harmon	Reggie Watts
James Vs. The Monologue, Take A Break - Juice Bar, Beatbox Jam From The Future
28	May 12, 2015	Susan Sarandon, Brooklyn Decker	Tori Kelly
Hip-Hop Round-Up, Thelma & Louise Alternate Endings, & Justin Bieber On Drums
29	May 13, 2015	Kat Graham, James Marsden	Brandon Flowers
Commencement Speech For Non-Graduating Seniors
30	May 14, 2015	One Direction	N/A
Side Effects May Include, Dodgeball
31	May 15, 2015	Anna Kendrick, Hailee Steinfeld, Brittany Snow	N/A
Applewatch Hidden Features, Pitch Perfect Riff-Off, Beatboxing With Pitch Perfect 2 Cast
32	May 18, 2015	Rebecca Romijn, Sam Rockwell	N/A
Emoji News, Reggie Answers Fan Questions
33	May 19, 2015	Lisa Kudrow, Zach Woods, Ashima Shiraishi	N/A
Like Us Again, Take A Break
34	May 20, 2015	Halle Berry, Jeffrey Dean Morgan	Sting
To honor David Letterman and his final show, which aired immediately preceding the broadcast, Corden began with a filmed cold open of Corden and Sting singing "Every Breath You Take" in front of the Ed Sullivan Theater. The show then began with the band playing Letterman's Late Show theme with "Thank you, Dave" written on the marquee above the stage. Corden's monologue was also a tribute to Letterman as well as a Top Ten List - Top Ten Things I'll Miss About David Letterman. The show ended with a final tribute - Corden tossing watermelons off of the ceiling of Television City. Also Carpool Karaoke with Justin Bieber.

=== June ===
No.	Original release date	Guest(s)	Musical/entertainment guest(s)
35	June 1, 2015	Hannah Simone, Pete Holmes	Noel Gallagher
Bar Mitzvah Announcement, Apptitude
36	June 2, 2015	Connie Britton, Guy Pearce	N/A
Talking Mentalist, Take A Break
37	June 3, 2015	Paul Dano, Allison Janney, Jerry Ferrara	N/A
Talking Mentalist, Talking Talking Mentalist, Holiday Theme Songs
38	June 4, 2015	Jane Fonda, Lily Tomlin, Elizabeth Banks	MKTO
Emoji News
39	June 8, 2015	Ellie Kemper, Thomas Middleditch, Nick Offerman	Palma Violets
Talking Mentalist, Nuzzle Waaa?
40	June 9, 2015	Betty White, Kyle MacLachlan	Reggie Watts
Apple Watch Hidden Features, Betty White Prank Call, Psychic Reggie
41	June 10, 2015	Chris Pratt, Bryce Dallas Howard, Jake Johnson	N/A
Kick It Out/Bring It Back, Tony Rex Confrontation
42	June 11, 2015	Kit Harington, David Duchovny	Tamia
Reggie's Picks, Meming Of Life
43	June 15, 2015	Jack Antonoff, Amy Landecker, Melora Hardin	N/A
Stage 56 Bar Tricks, Behind The Music
44	June 16, 2015	Kathy Griffin, Derek Luke	the Lone Bellow
Trump Stumpers, LA Pride
45	June 17, 2015	Jessica Szohr, Aasif Mandvi	Nick Thune
Reggie Switches With James During Monologue, Letter To James, Face Your Father
46	June 18, 2015	Carla Gugino, Chris Hardwick	N/A
Talking Hawaii Five-O, Carpool Karaoke with Iggy Azalea

=== July ===
No.	Original release date	Guest(s)	Musical/entertainment guest(s)
47	July 13, 2015	Carli Lloyd, Chris Tucker, Judy Greer	N/A
Emoji News, Dunk Tank Soccer
48	July 14, 2015	Shiri Appleby, Jim Gaffigan	Best Coast
Carpool Karaoke with Rod Stewart and ASAP Rocky
49	July 15, 2015	Kid Cudi, Cat Deeley	Ed Cage & Nicole Paris
6-Person Talking Late Late Show
50	July 16, 2015	Ian McKellen, James Wolk	Adam Lambert
Viewers' Choice Best Moment, In Memoriam, Getting Emotional, Adam Lambert Tribute
51	July 20, 2015	Christina Hendricks, Laverne Cox	Cody Simpson
Side Effects May Include, Holiday Theme Songs
52	July 21, 2015	Paula Abdul, Chris Colfer	Steve Byrne
Opposites Attract Remake, Meming Of Life
53	July 22, 2015	Kristin Chenoweth, Denis Leary	American Authors
Why Don't We Chat?, Kick It Out/Bring It Back
54	July 23, 2015	Judd Apatow, Cobie Smulders, Mark Duplass	Life of Dillon
Take A Break
55	July 27, 2015	Mark Ruffalo, Amy Smart, Jason Schwartzman	N/A
None Of The Above, Sardines
56	July 28, 2015	Trevor Noah, Odette Annable, Eric Idle	N/A
Apple Watch Hidden Features
57	July 29, 2015	Felicity Huffman, Hannibal Buress	Twin Shadow
Ticklish Writer Gets Massage, Take A Break
58	July 30, 2015	Christina Applegate, Christian Slater	Elle King
Are You Smarter Than a Whoopi Goldberg Impersonator?

=== August ===
No.	Original release date	Guest(s)	Musical/entertainment guest(s)
59	August 3, 2015	Matt LeBlanc, William H. Macy, Don Cheadle	N/A
Flinch
60	August 4, 2015	Gordon Ramsay, Josh Charles, Tilly Ramsay	Milky Chance
Singing Telegrams with Demi Lovato
61	August 5, 2015	Jeffrey Tambor, Nicole Richie, Adam Pally	Laura Marling
Celebrity Noses, What I Really Look Like
62	August 6, 2015	Rosemarie DeWitt, Joel McHale	Gary Barlow
Celebrity Noses, Apptitude, Tug Of War
63	August 10, 2015	Alison Pill, Kevin Bacon	Wolf Alice
Kevin Bacon Has An Issue, Face Your Roommate, Who's Your Co-Star
64	August 11, 2015	Carl Reiner, Jason Segel, Marc Maron	N/A
Vine School
65	August 12, 2015	Neil Patrick Harris, Craig Robinson	Reggie Watts
Side Effects May Include, Sexy Public Domain Songs, Instagram Song
66	August 17, 2015	Lake Bell, Chiwetel Ejiofor	Little Mix
Date With Sharon Stone, Emoji News
67	August 18, 2015	Patrick Stewart, Anthony Davis	Morrissey
Cosmagification (Magic Show)
68	August 19, 2015	Owen Wilson, Natasha Leggero, Johnny Knoxville	Robin Thicke
Nuzzle Whaaa???
69	August 20, 2015	Ben Kingsley, Zac Efron, Bill Hader	N/A (Reggie Watts & Dance Cartel)
None Of The Above, Reggie and Dance Cartel Perform a "Nautical Goodnight"
70	August 21, 2015	Jenna Marbles, Tyler Oakley, Kandee Johnson, The Slow Mo Guys, Epic Rap Battles of History	Boyce Avenue
The Slow Mo Guys Blow Up a Watermelon, Kandee Johnson Transforms James Corden, A Dog & James Corden Enjoy Dinner, Nuzzle Whaaa???, Epic Rap Battles of History: Skrillex vs. Mozart, YouQuiz

=== September ===
No.	Original release date	Guest(s)	Musical/entertainment guest(s)
71	September 8, 2015	Bradley Cooper, Andrew Garfield, Jake McDorman	Wiz Khalifa featuring Fall Out Boy
Mystery Pizza Box
72	September 9, 2015	Jason Sudeikis, Chris Bosh	N/A
Failed Network Promos with Stephen Colbert, Apple Watch Hidden Features, Chris Bosh Vs. LLS Staff Basketball Game
73	September 10, 2015	Jeremy Renner, Alison Brie	N/A
Joining The Phantom of the Opera Cast, Side Effects May Include
74	September 11, 2015	N/A	Leon Bridges
Highlights from the show's first six months: Every Tom Hanks Movie, David Beckham and James Corden's New Underwear Line, Sexy Public Domain Songs with Craig Robinson, Like Us On..., Kick It Out/Bring It Back, Basic Instinct Remake with Michael Douglas, James and Elizabeth Banks dance for Jane Fonda and Lily Tomlin, Hell's Cafeteria with Gordon Ramsay and Julie Chen, Celebrity Noses
75	September 14, 2015	Adam Scott, Wilmer Valderrama	Marian Hill
Carpool Karaoke with Stevie Wonder
76	September 15, 2015	Alice Cooper, Pauley Perrette	Ian Karmel
Lay It On Thicke with Robin Thicke (and Owen Wilson), Emoji News
77	September 16, 2015	Emily Mortimer, Chris O'Donnell	N/A
Stage 56 Bar Tricks, Stiff Upper Lip, Don't Google Yourself
78	September 17, 2015	Terry Crews, Meagan Good, Dylan O'Brien	Big Sean
Big Sean IDFWY Parody, NFL Field Goal Kicker, Lifting & Grunting
79	September 21, 2015	Allison Janney, Jesse Tyler Ferguson	Leona Lewis
Celebrity Noses
80	September 22, 2015	Emma Roberts, Kristen Schaal	Royal Blood
Breaking One Million Youtube Subscribers, Take a Break, Re-Voice Old Cartoons
81	September 23, 2015	Brit Marling, Kunal Nayyar	Fifth Harmony
Crosswalk the Musical
82	September 24, 2015	Mel Brooks, Jerrod Carmichael	N/A
Thursday Night Foodball, Police Stakeout
83	September 28, 2015	Carol Burnett, Marcia Gay Harden, Fred Savage	Catfish and the Bottlemen
Where's Reggie, Meming of Life
84	September 29, 2015	Matt Damon, Zachary Levi	Nitro Circus Live
Matt Damon Acts Out His Film Career, Nitro Circus Demo
85	September 30, 2015	Patricia Arquette, Jeremy Irvine, Matt Walsh	A$AP Rocky
None of the Above

=== October ===
No.	Original release date	Guest(s)	Musical/entertainment guest(s)
86	October 1, 2015	Jessica Alba, Ben Schwartz	Grace, G-Eazy
Major League Baseball Practice, Kick It Out/Bring It Back
87	October 5, 2015	Julianne Moore, John Stamos, Jack Hanna	N/A
Taylor Swift Soap Opera
88	October 6, 2015	Nina Dobrev, Chris Parnell	R. City
Fire Safety Tips, Pile High Club
89	October 7, 2015	Jamie Lee Curtis, Elyes Gabel, Sharon Osbourne	N/A
Side Effects May Include, Carpool Karaoke Outtakes
90	October 8, 2015	Nathan Lane, Rachel Bloom	The Maccabees
Visiting NFL Network, Inappropriate Musicals
91	October 12, 2015	Aaron Sorkin, Bradley Whitford	N/A
Where's Reggie?, Take a Break
92	October 13, 2015	Kirsten Dunst, Jeff Daniels	FFS
Hot Coffee, The Newsroom Gets Dumb & Dumber
93	October 14, 2015	Matthew Fox, Juliette Lewis, Colin Hanks	Echosmith
Emoji News
94	October 15, 2015	Cindy Crawford, Matt Bomer	Raury
Celebrity Noses, Cindy Crawford & Matt Bomer Are Too Beautiful to Interview, Flinch
95	October 26, 2015	Mary Lynn Rajskub, Luke Wilson	Travis Mills
Ghost Hunting
96	October 27, 2015	Rebecca Romijn, David Koechner, Estie Kung	Kygo
Tonight I Learned
97	October 28, 2015	Billy Bob Thornton, Brie Larson, Jack Whitehall	Aston Merrygold
Reggie Watts Instagram Quiz
98	October 29, 2015	Kate Hudson, Ruth Wilson, Billy Eichner	N/A
Recreating 'The Catch', A Lonely Halloween

=== November ===
No.	Original release date	Guest(s)	Musical/entertainment guest(s)
99	November 2, 2015	Mamie Gummer, Dennis Quaid	Wolf Alice
The Meming of Life
100	November 3, 2015	Kelly Osbourne, Josh Duhamel, Richard Barker	N/A
Side Effects May Include, Rent Josh Duhamel's Kid
101	November 4, 2015	Erin Andrews, Ken Jeong	Bloc Party
Carpool Karaoke with Jason Derulo
102	November 5, 2015	Bridget Moynahan, Paul Feig, Nicholas Hytner	The Charlatans
Somewhere After The Late Show, James Corden's Parents Explore the NFL
103	November 9, 2015	Alanis Morissette, LL Cool J	N/A
Alanis Morissette Updated "Ironic" Lyrics, Kick It Out Bring It Back
104	November 10, 2015	Anna Faris, Joshua Jackson, Patrick Vieira	Gavin James
Crying Lessons, Cooking Demo (pre-empted by Reggie's song)
105	November 11, 2015	Christoph Waltz, Carey Mulligan, Johnny Galecki	N/A
None of the Above, Book Club
106	November 12, 2015	Olivia Wilde, Saoirse Ronan, Melissa Benoist	N/A
By the Numbers, Take a Break
107	November 16, 2015	Natalie Dormer, Ty Burrell	Jeezy
James acknowledges the November 2015 Paris attacks, #AllMyEpisodes, Apple Watch Hidden Features
108	November 17, 2015	Harry Connick, Jr., Anthony Anderson, Ethan Hawke	X Ambassadors
Tonight I Learned
109	November 18, 2015	Anthony Mackie, Rainn Wilson	N/A
Carpool Karaoke with Justin Bieber 2
110	November 19, 2015	Joseph Gordon-Levitt, Bryan Cranston	Jacqueline Novak
Joseph Gordon-Levitt Is in James Corden's Head, M3n Not Boyz
111	November 23, 2015	Rob Lowe, David Spade	Shawn Mendes & Camila Cabello
Reggie Watts Holiday Songs, The Lowe Down
112	November 24, 2015	Roseanne Barr, Gina Rodriguez	Ellie Goulding, DNCE
Emoji News, 'Love Me Like You Do' Remix-Up
113	November 25, 2015	James Van Der Beek, Chrissy Teigen, Jay Duplass	Tove Lo
5 Reasons Not to Thanksgiving, Mom Face-Off
114	November 30, 2015	Amy Landecker, Taye Diggs	5 Seconds of Summer
Two Lies & One Truth, The Lost Member of 5SOS

=== December ===
No.	Original release date	Guest(s)	Musical/entertainment guest(s)
115	December 1, 2015	Krysten Ritter, Ted Danson	The Chainsmokers
Tonight I Learned, Apptitude
116	December 2, 2015	Toni Collette, Frank Grillo	James Bay
Carpool Karaoke with Carrie Underwood
117	December 3, 2015	Billy Crystal, One Direction	One Direction
Tattoo Roulette
118	December 7, 2015	Gwendoline Christie, Bryshere Y. Gray	Coldplay
Game of Thrones
119	December 8, 2015	Taraji P. Henson, Justin Bartha, Andrey Arshavin	Jermaine Fowler
Cookie Lyon, Gift Wrapping Demo (pre-empted by Reggie's song)
120	December 9, 2015	Tyler Oakley, Hank Azaria	Rick Ross
Holiday Giveaway, Meming of Life
121	December 10, 2015	Lewis Hamilton, Chris Hardwick	Cage the Elephant
Justin Bieber Performs the Monologue, Kick It Out/Bring It Back, The Star Wars Song
122	December 14, 2015	Justin Long, Josh Groban	Daya
Nina Tassler's Last Day at CBS, Public Domain Songs
123	December 15, 2015	Mike Epps, Domhnall Gleeson	Chvrches
Carpool Karaoke with One Direction
124	December 16, 2015	Amber Heard, Luke Bracey, Wanda Sykes	Carly Rae Jepsen
Ketchup Magic Trick, Celebrity Noses
125	December 17, 2015	Lily Tomlin, Seth MacFarlane	N/A (James Corden)
It's the Most Wonderful Show of the Year, Reggie's 12 Days of Christmas, Christmas Carpool Karaoke, Emoji News, James' Christmas Song
