= Julia Wagret =

French ice dancer

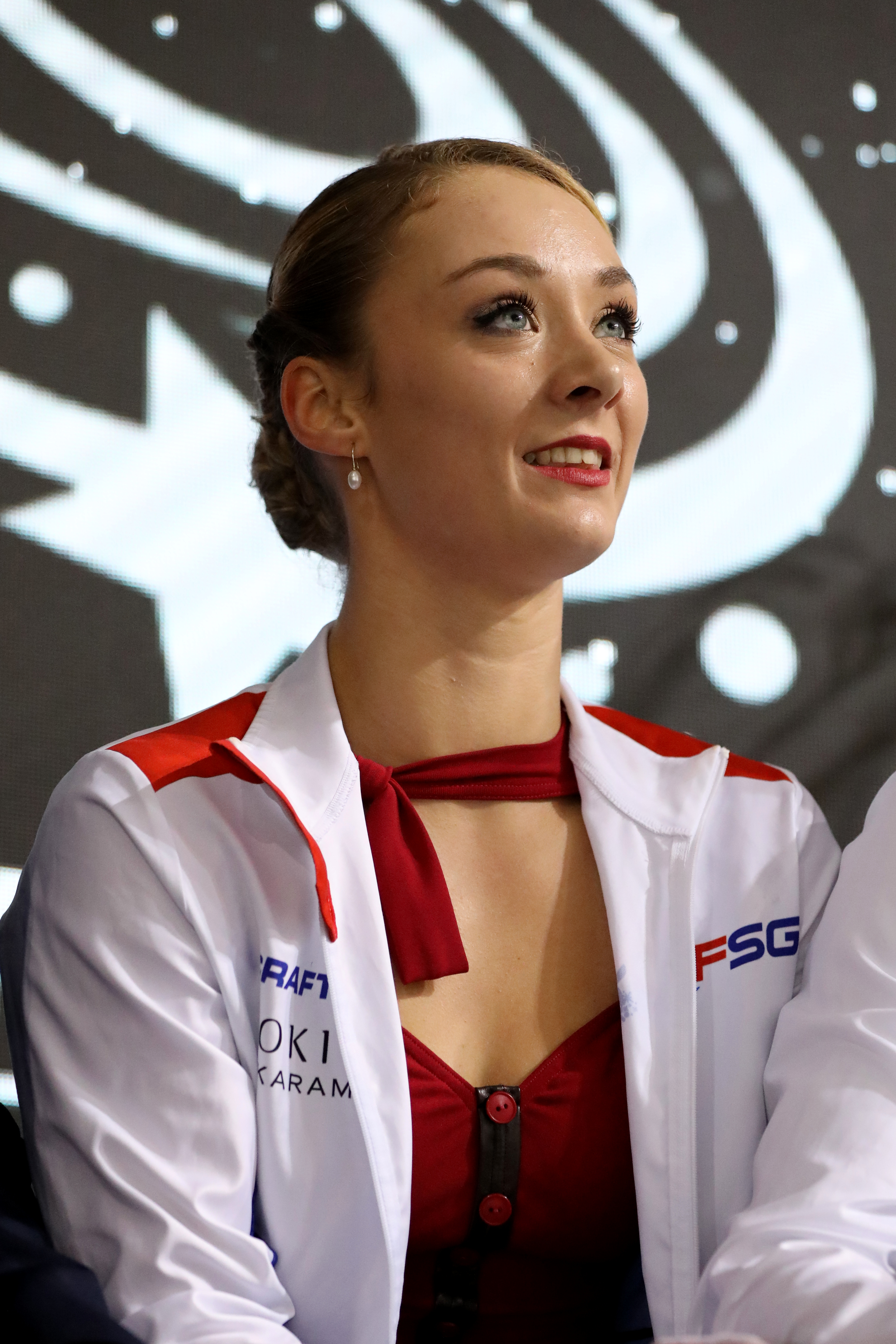
- Wagret in 2019

Personal information
- Born: 20 January 1999 (age 27) Valenciennes, France
- Home town: Estero, Florida, U.S.
- Height: 1.66 m (5 ft 5 1/2 in)

Figure skating career
- Country: France
- Coach: Alexander Zhulin; Petr Durnev; Dmitri Ionov; Sergei Petukhov
- Skating club: CPSG Courchevel
- Began skating: 2005
Medal record
Figure skating: Ice dance (with Couyras)
Representing Mixed-NOCs
Winter Youth Olympics
Silver medal – second place	2016 Lillehammer	Team

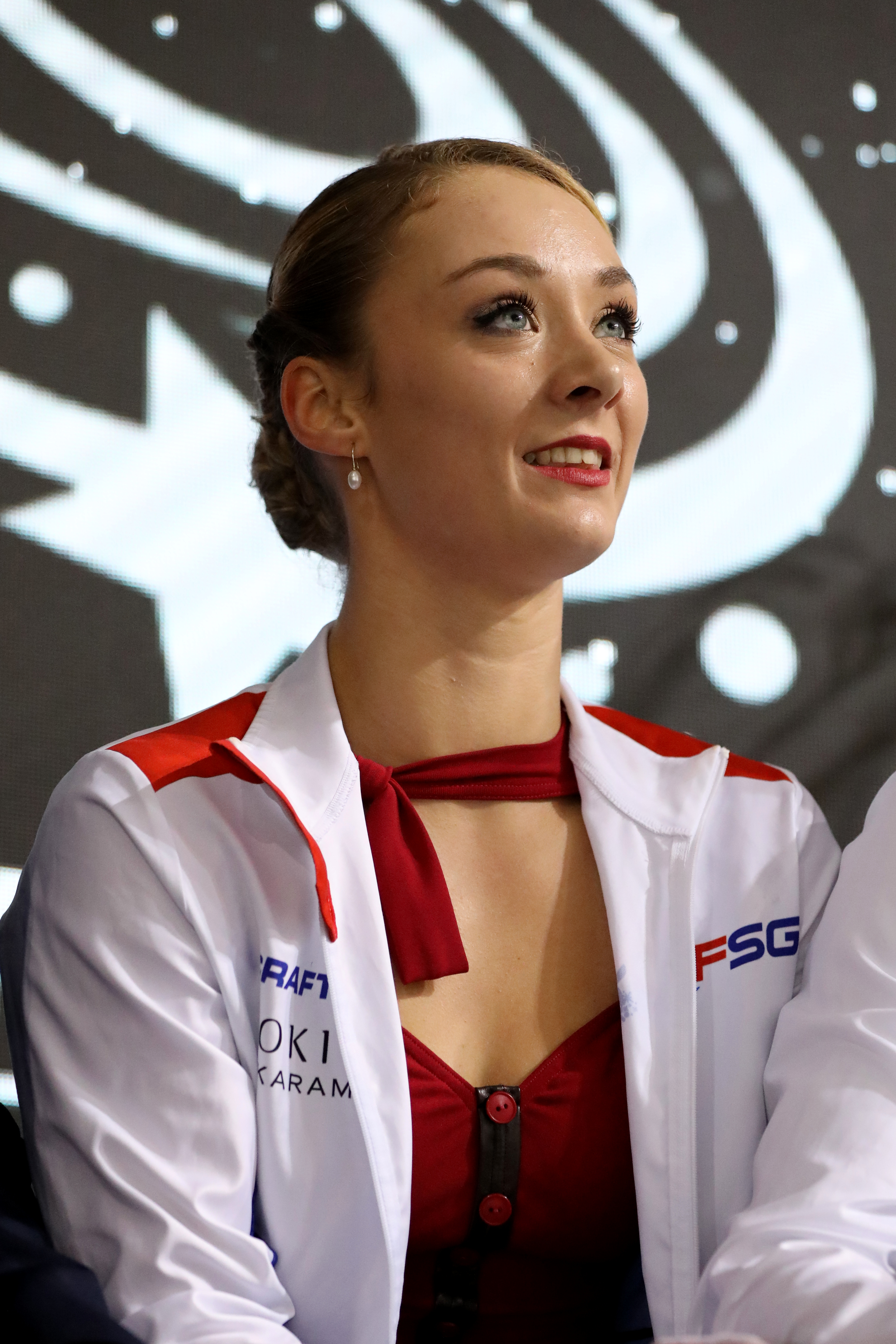

Julia Wagret (born 20 January 1999) is a French ice dancer. With her former skating partner, Pierre Souquet-Basiège, she became the 2020 Winter Star silver medalist. With her former skating partner, Mathieu Couyras, she became the 2017 French junior national bronze medalist and a silver medalist in the team event at the 2016 Winter Youth Olympics.

== Personal life ==
Wagret was born on 20 January 1999 in Valenciennes, France. She enjoys contemporary dance and drawing.

== Career ==
=== Early career ===
Wagret began competing with Mathieu Couyras in the 2011–12 season. They were coached by Muriel Zazoui and Olivier Schoenfelder in Lyon. Wagret/Couyras competed on the ISU Junior Grand Prix for four seasons before their split following the 2017–18 season.

=== 2018–2019 season ===
Wagret teamed up with Pierre Souquet-Basiège prior to the season. They placed in the top nine at three Challenger Series events, 2018 CS Lombardia Trophy, 2018 CS Inge Solar Memorial – Alpen Trophy, and 2018 CS Golden Spin of Zagreb. Wagret/Souquet-Basiège also competed at several Senior B competitions.

Wagret/Souquet-Basiège placed fourth at the 2019 French Championships. They concluded their season at the 2019 Winter Universiade, where they finished sixth.

=== 2019–2020 season ===
Wagret/Souquet-Basiège placed fifth at 2019 CS U.S. International Figure Skating Classic to open the season. They also placed fifth at 2019 CS Ice Star, earning personal bests in all three segments. Wagret/Souquet-Basiège were assigned to their first Grand Prix event, 2019 Internationaux de France, where they finished ninth.

=== 2020–2021 season ===
With the COVID-19 pandemic making international competition difficult, Wagret/Souquet-Basiège were initially assigned to compete at the 2020 Internationaux de France, but it was subsequently cancelled.

=== 2021–2022 season ===
Wagret/Souquet-Basiège debuted at the 2021 CS Lombardia Trophy, placing fourteenth.

== Programs ==
=== With Souquet-Basiège ===
Season	Rhythm dance	Free dance
2021–2022	Blues: Torture by X Ambassadors & Earl St. Clair; Jazz: Criminal by Earl St. Clair choreo. by Laurie May, Alexander Zhulin	The Heart Wants; The Secret History by Kerry Muzzey choreo. by Laurie May, Alexander Zhulin
2019–2020	Foxtrot: Singin' in the Rain; Quickstep: Good Mornin' from Singin' in the Rain by Nacio Herb Brown choreo. by Massimo Scali	Cornerstone; The People and I; Nemesis by Benjamin Clementine choreo. by Massimo Scali
2018–2019	Calambre by Quinteto Suarez Paz	It Must Have Been Love by Roxette performed by Maria Mena

=== With Couyras ===
Season	Short dance	Free dance
2017–2018	Cha cha: Don't Stop the Party by Pitbull; Rhumba: See You Again by Wiz Khalifa; Samba: Fireball by Pitbull choreo. by Diana Ribas, Olivier Schoenfelder	Pina by Thom Hanreich; When We Were Young by Adele; Experience by Ludovico Einaudi choreo. by Diana Ribas, Olivier Schoenfelder
2016–2017	Blues: Try a Little Tenderness by Otis Redding; Hip hop: Try a Little Tenderness by Jay-Z; Hip hop: Turn Down for What by DJ Snake choreo. by Diana Ribas, Olivier Schoenfelder	Under Pressure by Queen, David Bowie; How Can I Go On by Freddie Mercury, Montserrat Caballé; One Vision by Queen choreo. by Diana Ribas, Olivier Schoenfelder
2015–2016	Waltz: I Won't Give Up; March: 1, 2, 3, 4; Waltz: Howl's Moving Castle from Howl's Moving Castle by Joe Hisaishi choreo. by Diana Ribas, Olivier Schoenfelder	Another Brick in the Wall; Hey You; Another Brick in the Wall by Pink Floyd choreo. by Diana Ribas, Olivier Schoenfelder
2014–2015	Cha cha: Guantamanero; Samba: Fourmiz by Harry Gregson-Williams, John Powell choreo. by Diana Ribas, Olivier Schoenfelder	They Can't Take That Away from Me by George Gershwin, Ira Gershwin performed by Ella Fitzgerald, Louis Armstrong; Bang Bang choreo. by Diana Ribas, Olivier Schoenfelder

== Competitive highlights ==
GP: Grand Prix; CS: Challenger Series; JGP: Junior Grand Prix.

=== With Souquet-Basiège ===
International
Event	18–19	19–20	20–21	21–22
GP France		9th	C	
CS Alpen Trophy	7th			
CS Denis Ten MC				WD
CS Ice Star		5th		
CS Golden Spin	9th			
CS Lombardia Trophy	8th			14th
CS U.S. Classic		5th		
CS Warsaw Cup				WD
Bavarian Open	6th			
Bosphorus Cup		4th		
Halloween Cup	4th			
Universiade	6th			
Volvo Open Cup	7th			
Winter Star			2nd	
National
French Champ.	4th	5th		
Masters	3rd	6th		
TBD = Assigned; WD = Withdrew; C = Cancelled

=== With Couyras ===
International: Junior
Event	12–13	13–14	14–15	15–16	16–17	17–18
Youth Olympics				8th		
JGP Austria				14th		
JGP Belarus						8th
JGP Estonia					4th	
JGP France			10th			
JGP Poland						8th
JGP Russia					5th	
Bavarian Open		6th N				
GP Bratislava					2nd	
Mentor Toruń Cup				5th		3rd
NRW Trophy				6th		
Open d'Andorra				4th		
Pavel Roman	4th N	9th				
National
French Junior	17th	9th	5th	4th	3rd	
Masters		9th J	4th J	5th J		
Team Events
Youth Olympics				2nd T 6th P		
Levels: J = Junior; N = Novice; T = Team result; P = Personal result. Medals awarded for team result only.
