= Pierre Souquet-Basiège =

French ice dancer

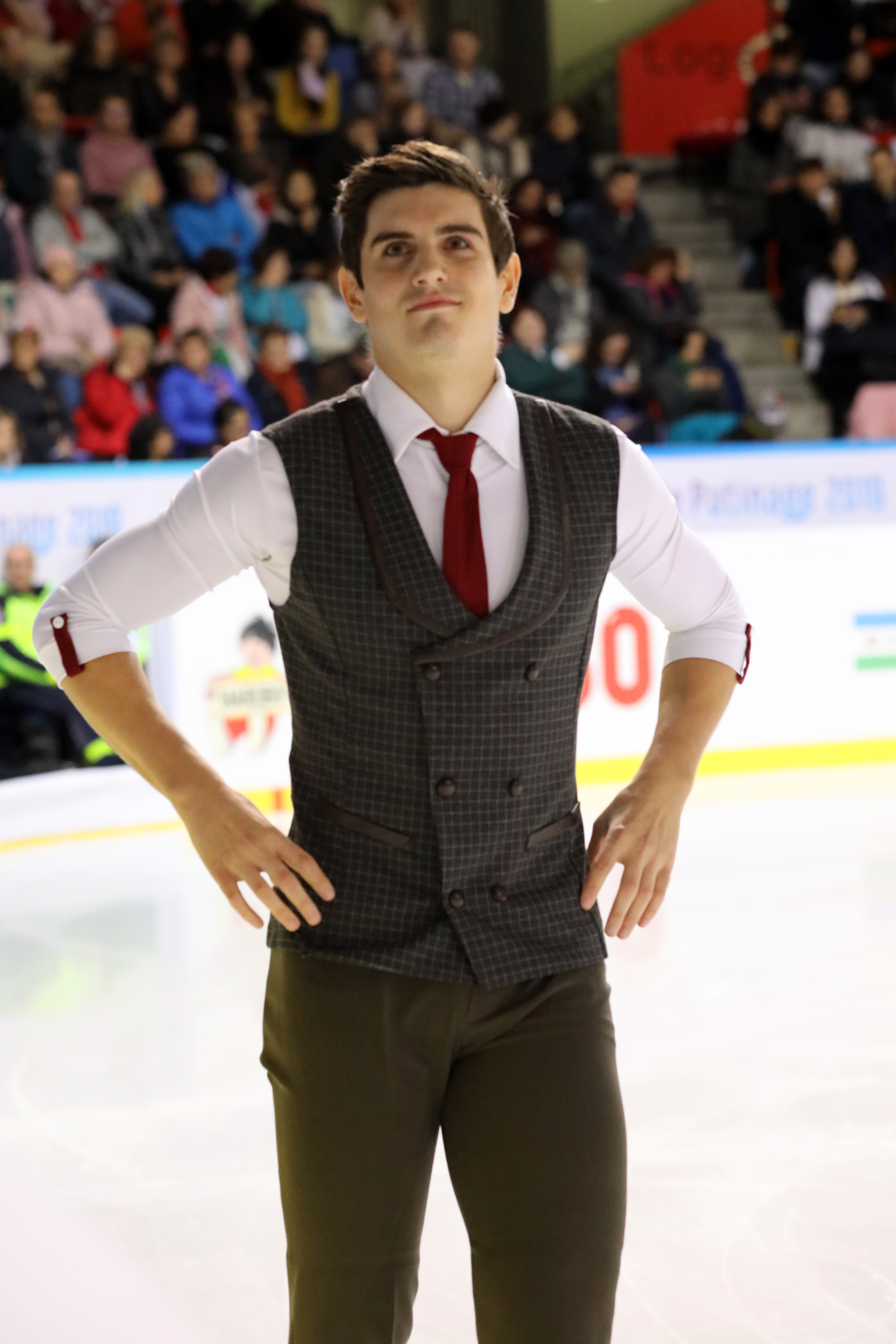
- Souquet-Basiège in 2019

Personal information
- Other names: Pierre Souquet
- Born: 18 July 1994 (age 32) Paris, France
- Height: 1.81 m (5 ft 11 1/2 in)

Figure skating career
- Country: France
- Coach: Alexander Zhulin; Petr Durnev; Dmitri Ionov; Sergei Petukhov
- Skating club: Rouen Olympic Club
- Began skating: 1998

Pierre Souquet-Basiège (born 18 July 1994) is a French ice dancer. With his former skating partner, Julia Wagret, he is the 2020 Winter Star silver medalist. With his former skating partner, Lorenza Alessandrini, he is the 2015 International Cup of Nice silver medalist and a two-time French national medalist. They competed in the final segment at the 2016 European Championships.

== Personal life ==
Pierre Souquet-Basiège was born on 18 July 1994 in Paris, France. His previously competed under the surname Souquet.

== Career ==
=== Early career ===
Souquet began learning to skate in 1998. He competed with Péroline Ojardias early in his ice dancing career. The two were coached by Muriel Zazoui and Romain Haguenauer in Lyon.

=== Partnership with Alessandrini ===
By July 2014, Souquet had teamed up with Italy's Lorenza Alessandrini to compete for France. In December, the duo placed fourth at the French Championships. Making their international debut, they placed 5th at the Bavarian Open in February 2015.

Alessandrini/Souquet won their first international medal, silver, in October 2015 at the Cup of Nice, before taking silver at the French Championships in December. The following month, they competed at the 2016 European Championships in Bratislava, Slovakia. Ranked 16th in the short dance, they qualified to the free dance and finished 20th overall. They were coached by Muriel Zazoui, Olivier Schoenfelder, Diana Ribas, and Roberto Pelizzola in Lyon.

Making their Grand Prix debut, Alessandrini/Souquet placed 9th at the 2016 Trophée de France. They received the bronze medal at the French Championships.

=== 2018–2019 season ===
Souquet-Basiège teamed up with Julia Wagret prior to the season. They placed in the top nine at three Challenger Series events, 2018 CS Lombardia Trophy, 2018 CS Inge Solar Memorial – Alpen Trophy, and 2018 CS Golden Spin of Zagreb. Wagret/Souquet-Basiège also competed at several Senior B competitions.

Wagret/Souquet-Basiège placed fourth at the 2019 French Championships. They concluded their season at the 2019 Winter Universiade, where they finished sixth.

=== 2019–2020 season ===
Wagret/Souquet-Basiège placed fifth at 2019 CS U.S. International Figure Skating Classic to open the season. They also placed fifth at 2019 CS Ice Star, earning personal bests in all three segments. Wagret/Souquet-Basiège were assigned to their first Grand Prix event, 2019 Internationaux de France, where they finished ninth.

=== 2020–2021 season ===
With the COVID-19 pandemic making international competition difficult, Wagret/Souquet-Basiège were initially assigned to compete at the 2020 Internationaux de France, but it was subsequently cancelled.

=== 2021–2022 season ===
Wagret/Souquet-Basiège debuted at the 2021 CS Lombardia Trophy, placing fourteenth.

== Programs ==
=== With Wagret ===
Season	Rhythm dance	Free dance
2021–2022	Blues: Torture by X Ambassadors & Earl St. Clair; Jazz: Criminal by Earl St. Clair choreo. by Laurie May, Alexander Zhulin	The Heart Wants; The Secret History by Kerry Muzzey choreo. by Laurie May, Alexander Zhulin
2019–2020	Foxtrot: Singin' in the Rain; Quickstep: Good Mornin' from Singin' in the Rain by Nacio Herb Brown choreo. by Massimo Scali	Cornerstone; The People and I; Nemesis by Benjamin Clementine choreo. by Massimo Scali
2018–2019	Calambre by Quinteto Suarez Paz	It Must Have Been Love by Roxette performed by Maria Mena

=== With Alessandrini ===
Season	Short dance	Free dance
2017–18	Abre Que Voy; Historia de un Amor by Carlos Eleta Almaran; Cuba	U-Turn (Lili) by AaRON; Angel by Sarah McLachlan; Iris by Goo Goo Dolls
2016–17	Treat Me Rough by Debbie Gravitte; Rhythm by Casey McGill, Spirits of Rhythm	Trees; Summer by Max Richter; Love Actually by Craig Armstrong
2015–16	Sous le ciel de Paris; Les Grands Boulevards by Yves Montand	Walking in the Sand; The Lilac Tree; Walking in the Sand by Jeff Beck, Imelda May
2014–2015	Flamenco; The Mask of Zorro by James Horner	I Suoni dell'isola by Luis Bacalov; Cinema Paradiso; Fuga, ricerna, e ritorno by Ennio Morricone

=== With Ojardias ===
Season	Short dance	Free dance
2013–14	Quickstep: I'm Not Sleepin' by Big Bad Voodoo Daddy; Slow fox: Fool For Your Love by Tom Gaebel; Quickstep: I'm Not Sleepin' by Big Bad Voodoo Daddy choreo. by Diana Ribas	Isolated System; Unnatural Selection by Muse choreo. by Romain Haguenauer

== Competitive highlights ==
GP: Grand Prix; CS: Challenger Series; JGP: Junior Grand Prix

=== With Wagret ===
International
Event	18–19	19–20	20–21	21-22
GP France		9th	C	
CS Alpen Trophy	7th			
CS Denis Ten MC				WD
CS Ice Star		5th		
CS Golden Spin	9th			
CS Lombardia Trophy	8th			14th
CS U.S. Classic		5th		
CS Warsaw Cup				WD
Bavarian Open	6th			
Bosphorus Cup		4th		
Halloween Cup	4th			
Universiade	6th			
Volvo Open Cup	7th			
Winter Star			2nd	
National
French Champ.	4th	5th		
Masters	3rd	6th		
TBD = Assigned; WD = Withdrew; C = Cancelled

=== With Alessandrini ===
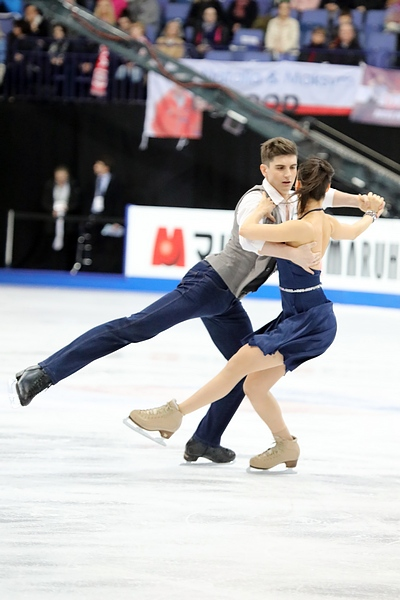
Alessandrini/Souquet at the 2017 World Championships

International
Event	2014–15	2015–16	2016–17	2017–18
World Champ.			28th	
European Champ.		20th		
GP Trophée de France			9th	10th
CS Finlandia Trophy				16th
CS Nebelhorn Trophy		8th	7th	
CS Tallinn Trophy		8th		10th
Bavarian Open	5th	4th	6th	
Cup of Nice		2nd		11th
Santa Claus Cup		6th		
Toruń Cup			5th	
National
French Championships	4th	2nd	3rd	
WD = Withdrew

=== With Ojardias ===
International
Event	2011–12	2012–13
Ice Challenge		4th J
Santa Claus Cup		7th J
Trophy of Lyon	13th J	3rd J
National
French Junior Champ.	10th	3rd
Masters		4th J
J = Junior level
