= General Admission (Machine Gun Kelly album) =

Studio album by Machine Gun Kelly
- Released: October 16, 2015
- Recorded: 2013–2015
- Genre: Hip-hop
- Length: 51:35
- Labels: EST 19XX; Bad Boy; Interscope
- Producers: Machine Gun Kelly (also exec.); Jim Jonsin; Narcotics; Casey McPerry; J.U.S.T.I.C.E. League; JP Did This 1; Slim Gudz; Nathan Fox; J.P. Floyd; Rami Beatz; Ned Cameron; Grizz Lee; Tommy Brown; Pops; Cool & Dre

Machine Gun Kelly chronology
Fuck It (2015)	General Admission (2015)	Bloom (2017)

Singles from General Admission
- 1. "Till I Die" Released: January 5, 2015; 2. "A Little More" Released: March 30, 2015; 3. "World Series" Released: September 25, 2015; 4. "Gone" Released: October 2, 2015

General Admission is the second studio album by American rapper Machine Gun Kelly. It was released on October 16, 2015, by his label EST 19XX, in a joint venture with Bad Boy and Interscope Records. The album was supported by two singles: "Till I Die" and "A Little More" featuring Victoria Monet.

== Promotion ==
In preparation for the official release of General Admission, MGK released a 10-track mixtape, titled Fuck It, on July 23, 2015. MGK had reportedly released the mixtape out of frustration, following Bad Boy delaying the release of General Admission several times. The mixtape is compiled of songs that were left off of General Admission, and was released to his fans as an apology for the delays. MGK released the album artwork and revealed the release date on September 11, 2015, via Instagram. Many fans took it upon themselves to spray paint the album title around their hometowns to show their support and loyalty to MGK's EST movement.

== Singles ==
The album's lead single, called "Till I Die" was released on January 5, 2015 via YouTube, through MGK's Vevo account. The song was produced by MGK, alongside Casey McPerry and the production team J.U.S.T.I.C.E. League. The song charted at number 32 on the Billboard's Hot R&B/Hip-Hop Songs charts. In June 2015, MGK released the single's sequel through WorldStarHipHop, featuring guest appearances from the Cleveland-based hip-hop group Bone Thugs-n-Harmony, fellow rapper and Bad Boy artist French Montana, and rappers Yo Gotti and Real Kid, along with the accompanying music video.

The album's second single, called "A Little More" was released on March 30, 2015, through the same channels, with the accompanying music video releasing on May 18, 2015. The song features a guest appearance by American singer-songwriter Victoria Monet, with production provided by Tommy Brown. "A Little More" charted on the two respective charts, performing marginally worse at 108 and 35 respectively; however, the song did chart at number 81 on the Canadian Hot 100.

=== Other songs ===
The tracks "World Series" and "Gone", featuring Leroy Sanchez, were released via the same channels as their predecessors. However, these tracks did not chart due to the singles being album specifics, and were released with the intention to promote the album, as both were released a few weeks prior to the album.

== Reception ==
Professional ratings
Review scores
Source	Rating
AllMusic	3.5/5 stars
HipHopDX	3/5 stars
XXL	(XL)

Chris Mench of XXL found the album a step up from his debut effort, saying that, "General Admission has its low moments — the series of emotional, down-tempo songs is a bit repetitive by the end — but it feels much more cohesive than his last effort." David Jeffries of AllMusic stated that "General Admission can be corrosive and coarse like Nirvana's In Utero, but while it lacks that album's artistic weight, it's proud to be unattractive which, oddly enough, becomes this druggy downer's allure." Marcus Dowling of HipHopDX called it "a mixed-bag of an album that aims high and falls short, but an amazing story is told along the way." Conversely, Jacob Sigmon of WPGU said "the lyrics, production value, and overall message is sloppy and very painful to listen to."

== Commercial performance ==
General Admission debuted at number 4 on the Billboard 200, powered by first week sales of 56,000 equivalent album units; it sold 49,000 copies in its first week, with the remainder of its unit total reflecting the album's streaming activity and track sales. The album also debuted at number one on the Billboard Top R&B/Hip-Hop Albums.

== Track listing ==
No.	Title	Writer(s)	Producer(s)	Length
1.	"Spotlight" (featuring Lzzy Hale)	Colson Baker; James Scheffer; Elizabeth Hale; Isaac de Boni; Michael Mule; Michael Burman	Jim Jonsin	5:05
2.	"Alpha Omega"	Baker; Michael Crawford; Earl Johnson; Bob Montgomery; B. White; D. Langford; B. Allen	Narcotics	3:32
3.	"Till I Die"	Baker; Casey McPerry; Erik Reyes-Ortiz; Kenneth Bartolomei; Marcel Primous	MGK; McPerry; J.U.S.T.I.C.E. League	3:33
4.	"Eddie Cane"	Baker; Johnson	JP Did This 1	3:06
5.	"Bad Mother Fucker" (featuring Kid Rock)	Baker; Johnson; Robert Ritchie	JP Did This 1	3:33
6.	"World Series"	Baker; Johnson	MGK; JP Did This 1; Slim Gudz	3:35
7.	"Oz."	Baker; Scheffer; de Boni; George Clinton; Niko Marzouca	Jim Jonsin	2:54
8.	"Everyday"	Baker; Nathan Fox; Rami Eadeh	Fox; J.P. Floyd; Rami Beatz	4:01
9.	"Gone" (featuring Leroy Sanchez)	Baker; Scheffer; Leroy Sanchez; de Boni; Marzouca	Jim Jonsin	4:01
10.	"Story of the Stairs"	Baker; Ned Cameron	Cameron; Grizz Lee	3:10
11.	"Merry Go Round"	Baker; Scheffer; Jennifer Decilveo; de Boni; Jetta Hartley	Jonsin; Decilveo	4:05
12.	"A Little More" (featuring Victoria Monet)	Baker; Tommy Brown; Victoria McCants; Thomas Lumpkins	Brown	3:57
13.	"All Night Long"	Baker; Andrew Papaleo; Warren Zevon	Pops	7:02
Total length:				51:35

Deluxe edition (bonus tracks)
No.	Title	Writer(s)	Producer(s)	Length
14.	"Make It Happen"	Baker; Johnson; Eric Allen; Diji Parq	JP Did This 1	4:43
15.	"Round Here"	Baker	Slim Gudz	4:20
16.	"Therapy"	Baker; Brown	Brown	3:34
Total length:				65:10

f.y.e. exclusive bonus tracks
No.	Title	Writer(s)	Producer(s)	Length
17.	"Life"	Baker; Andre Lyon; Marcello Valenzano	Cool & Dre	3:59
18.	"Till I Die: Part II" (featuring Bone Thugs-n-Harmony, French Montana, Yo Gotti and Ray Cash)	Baker; McPerry; Reyes-Ortiz; Bartolomei; Primous; Byron McCane; Charles Scruggs; Steve Howse; Anthony Henderson; Stanley Howse; Karim Kharbouch; Mario Mims; Wardell Cheeks	MGK; McPerry; J.U.S.T.I.C.E. League	4:18
Total length:				73:27

== Charts ==
=== Weekly charts ===
Chart (2015)	Peak position
Australian Albums (ARIA)	38
Belgian Albums (Ultratop Flanders)	74
Canadian Albums (Billboard)	5
German Albums (Offizielle Top 100)	94
New Zealand Albums (RMNZ)	33
Norwegian Albums (VG-lista)	30
Swiss Albums (Schweizer Hitparade)	72
UK Albums (Official Charts)	77
UK R&B Albums (Official Charts)	13
US Billboard 200	4
US Top R&B/Hip-Hop Albums (Billboard)	1

=== Year-end charts ===
Chart (2015)	Position
US Top R&B/Hip-Hop Albums (Billboard)	67
Chart (2016)	Position
US Top R&B/Hip-Hop Albums (Billboard)	92

== Certifications ==
Region	Certification	Certified units/sales
United States (RIAA)	Gold	500,000^{‡}
^{‡} Sales+streaming figures based on certification alone.

== See also ==
- List of Billboard number-one R&B/Hip-Hop albums of 2015
