= No Class Tour =

2014 concert tour by Machine Gun Kelly

- Tour by Machine Gun Kelly
- Location: North America
- Associated album: Lace Up
- Start date: September 7, 2014
- End date: October 31, 2014
- No. of shows: 33
- Supporting act: Limp Bizkit

Machine Gun Kelly concert chronology
- No Class Tour (2014); Mainstream Sellout Tour (2022)

The No Class Tour was the debut concert tour by American recording artist Machine Gun Kelly, in support of his debut album Lace Up. The tour was supported by Limp Bizkit on select dates.

== Set list ==
This set list is representative of the performance on October 8, 2014. It is not representative of all concerts for the duration of the tour.

1. "See My Tears"
2. "Breaking News"
3. "Chip Off the Block"
4. "Swing Life Away"
5. "EST 4 Life"
6. "Invincible"
7. "Warning Shot"
8. "Free The Madness"
9. "Wanna Ball"
10. "Wild Boy"
11. "Mind of a Stoner"
12. "Peso"
13. "Sail"

== Tour dates ==
Date	City	Country	Venue
North America
September 7, 2014	Casper	United States	Club Elevation
September 9, 2014	Rapid City	United States	Rushmore Hall
September 10, 2014	Sioux Falls	United States	Ramkota Expo Hall
September 11, 2014	Omaha	United States	Sokol Auditorium
September 12, 2014	Grand Forks	United States	Chester Fritz Auditorium
September 15, 2014	Los Angeles	United States	Wiltern Theater
September 16, 2014	Las Vegas	United States	House of Blues
September 19, 2014	Dallas	United States	South Side Ballroom
September 20, 2014	San Antonio	United States	Aztec Theatre
September 21, 2014	Oklahoma City	United States	Diamond Ballroom
September 24, 2014	Tulsa	United States	Cain's Ballroom
September 27, 2014	Maplewood	United States	Myth
September 28, 2014	Chicago	United States	Aragon Ballroom
September 30, 2014	St. Louis	United States	The Pageant
October 1, 2014	Indianapolis	United States	Egyptian Room
October 3, 2014	Detroit	United States	The Fillmore
October 6, 2014	Huntington	United States	Paramount Theater
October 7, 2014	Upper Darby Township	United States	Tower Theater
October 8, 2014	New York City	United States	Best Buy Theater
October 10, 2014	Boston	United States	House of Blues
October 11, 2014	Wallingford	United States	Oakdale Theatre
October 12, 2014	Silver Spring	United States	The Fillmore
October 14, 2014	Louisville	United States	Diamond Pub & Billiards
October 15, 2014	Springfield	United States	Gillioz Theatre
October 16, 2014	Columbia	United States	The Blue Note
October 17, 2014	Wichita	United States	The Cotillion Ballroom
October 18, 2014	Des Moines	United States	Val Air Ballroom
October 19, 2014	Lincoln	United States	Bourbon Theater
October 21, 2014	Bemidji	United States	Sanford Center
October 24, 2014	Davenport	United States	Danceland Ballroom
October 26, 2014	Bloomington	United States	Castle Theater
October 30, 2014	Fargo	United States	Fargo Civic Center
October 31, 2014	Bismarck	United States	Bismarck Civic Center
