= A Little More =

A Little More may refer to:

- "A Little More" (Machine Gun Kelly song), 2015
- "A Little More" (Ed Sheeran song), 2025
- "A Little More", by Jennifer Knapp from Lay It Down, 2000
- "A Little More", by Alessia Cara from The Pains of Growing, 2018
