= Hold On (Shut Up) =

Single by Machine Gun Kelly featuring Young Jeezy

from the album Lace Up
- Released: August 6, 2012
- Recorded: 2012
- Genre: Hip hop
- Length: 3:30
- Label: Bad Boy; Interscope
- Songwriters: Colson Baker; E. Johnson Jr.; Jay Jenkins
- Producer: JP Did This 1

Machine Gun Kelly singles chronology
"Invincible" (2012)	"Hold On (Shut Up)" (2012)	"Till I Die" (2015)

Young Jeezy singles chronology
"Keys to the City" (2012)	"Hold On (Shut Up)" (2012)	"Show Out" (2013)

"Hold On (Shut Up)" is a song by American rapper Machine Gun Kelly featuring fellow American rapper Young Jeezy. Produced by JP Did This 1, it was released on August 6, 2012, serves as the third single from his debut studio album Lace Up.

== Background ==
The song was officially released through a mixtape by DJ Clue, called Desert Storm Radio: The Takeover, which was released on August 6, 2012. It was later included on Kelly's mixtape "EST 4 Life" (featuring DUBO), which was released on August 13, 2012. On August 7, 2012, MGK announced in a Ustream session that the song would be the third single for his upcoming album, Lace Up.

== Music video ==
The official music video was released on November 19, 2012.

== Track listing ==
Digital single

No.	Title	Producer(s)	Length
1.	"Hold On (Shut Up)" (featuring Young Jeezy)	JP Did This 1	3:30

== Credits and personnel ==
- Songwriter – Richard Baker, Jay Jenkins
- Production – JP Did This 1
- Recording engineer - Brian White

== Charts ==
Chart (2012)	Peak position
US Hot R&B/Hip-Hop Songs (Billboard)	86

== Release history ==
Country	Date	Format	Label
United States	October 9, 2012	Digital download	Bad Boy, Interscope
