= I Tell a Fly =

Studio album by Benjamin Clementine
- Released: 29 September 2017
- Recorded: 2016–2017
- Studio: RAK, London; Abbey Road, London; Studio 13, London
- Genre: Avant-garde; experimental pop; contemporary classical
- Length: 45:00
- Label: Behind / Virgin EMI
- Producer: Benjamin Clementine

Benjamin Clementine chronology
At Least for Now (2015)	I Tell a Fly (2017)	And I Have Been (2022)

Singles from I Tell a Fly
- 1. "Phantom of Aleppoville" Released: 30 May 2017; 2. "God Save the Jungle" Released: 26 June 2017; 3. "Jupiter" Released: 23 August 2017

I Tell a Fly is the second album by English artist and poet Benjamin Clementine. It follows his Mercury Prize-winning debut album, At Least for Now. According to a press release, the album was written and produced by Clementine, recorded at RAK Studios, Abbey Road Studios and Studio 13. It was released on 29 September 2017 in Europe and 2 October in the United States.

== Critical reception ==
Professional ratings
Aggregate scores
Source	Rating
AnyDecentMusic?	7.4/10
Metacritic	81/100
Review scores
Source	Rating
AllMusic	4/5 stars
The Independent	4/5 stars
The Line of Best Fit	8.5/10
Mojo	4/5 stars
Q Magazine	4/5 stars
Record Collector	4/5 stars
The Skinny	4/5 stars
MusicOMH	4/5 stars

I Tell a Fly was well-received by contemporary music critics upon its initial release. At Metacritic, which assigns a normalised rating out of 100 to reviews from music critics, the album received a universal acclaim score of 81 based on 12 reviews.

In the review for AllMusic, Timothy Monger described the album as being "Meticulously packed with lead and backing vocals in a variety of timbres, songs like the warbling harpsichord-ornamented "Better Sorry Than a Safe" and the sprawling and kooky refugee crisis commentary "Phantom of Aleppoville" show an intense artist operating at a full sprint down the crooked ginnels of his imagination." Andy Gill, writing a review for The Independent regarded the music as classical and avant-garde with operatic delivery, pointing out that, I Tell A Fly won’t be to everyone’s taste--which in this era of increasing conformity may be its most valuable asset. Writing for The Skinny, Aiden Ryan noted that Clementine sounded wholly original. On I Tell a Fly, he offers stunning, stirring proof that his originality extends beyond his voice to his phrasing on every instrument he touches – piano, but also here, showcased to great effect, harpsichord and clavichord – as well as to arrangements and production. All of which conspires to pummel and purge every tired expectation that repetitive rap, rock, dance, pop, indie, and alternative music have wrought into us. Appropriately, the album opens with Farewell Sonata. Simon Price from Q Magazine stated "Anyone expecting an album of unchallenging fodder is in for a shock. Like the voyage faced by its desperate, stateless subjects, I Tell A Fly is no easy ride."

In a less enthusiastic review for The Guardian, Alexis Petridis said that Clementine clearly has things to say about some important topics, and it’s hard not to think they might reach a wider audience if they were a little less obliquely presented. Equally, there’s something laudable about an artist using their initial success not as a foundation for steady commercial growth but as leverage to get something like I Tell a Fly released and promoted by a major label.

== Track listing ==
All tracks are written by Benjamin Clementine.

I Tell a Fly track listing
No.	Title	Length
1.	"Farewell Sonata"	4:34
2.	"God Save the Jungle"	3:15
3.	"Better Sorry Than Asafe"	5:53
4.	"Phantom of Aleppoville"	6:31
5.	"Paris Cor Blimey"	4:23
6.	"Jupiter"	2:41
7.	"Ode from Joyce"	2:05
8.	"One Awkward Fish"	4:13
9.	"By the Ports of Europe"	3:41
10.	"Quintessence"	3:47
11.	"Ave Dreamer"	4:27
Total length:		45:00

== Personnel ==
- Benjamin Clementine – music, production, artwork
- Alexis Bossard – drums
- Steve Sedgwick – recording engineer and mixer
- John Davis – mastering engineer
- Max Anstruther – recording engineer
- Wes Maebe – recording engineer
- Robbie Nelson – recording engineer
- Duncan Fuller – assistant recording engineer
- Craig Mcdean – photography
- Akatre – design

== Charts ==
Chart performance for I Tell a Fly
Chart (2017)	Peak position
Austrian Albums (Ö3 Austria)	30
Belgian Albums (Ultratop Flanders)	56
Belgian Albums (Ultratop Wallonia)	33
French Albums (SNEP)	24
German Albums (Offizielle Top 100)	68
Portuguese Albums (AFP)	3
Scottish Albums (OCC)	96
Spanish Albums (PROMUSICAE)	92
Swiss Albums (Schweizer Hitparade)	23
