= Till I Die (Machine Gun Kelly song) =

Single by MGK

from the album General Admission
- Released: January 5, 2015
- Recorded: 2014
- Genre: Hip hop
- Length: 3:51
- Label: EST 19XX; Bad Boy; Interscope
- Songwriters: Baker; Casey McPerry; Erik Reyes-Ortiz; Kenneth Bartolomei; Marcel Primous
- Producers: Casey McPerry; MGK; J.U.S.T.I.C.E. League

MGK singles chronology
"Hold On (Shut Up)" (2012)	"Till I Die" (2015)	"A Little More" (2015)

Music video
- "Till I Die" on YouTube

"Till I Die" is a song by American rapper Machine Gun Kelly. The song was released on January 6, 2015 as the lead single from his sophomore studio album, General Admission. It contains references to artists from Cleveland, as well as to the life in the state of Ohio. The song received positive reviews, with critics praising MGK's lyrical ability and inert references to Cleveland, describing the song as a "perfect trap anthem". The song was produced by J.U.S.T.I.C.E. League when the song was recorded in 2014, and the group also handled the distribution of the song.

== Sequel ==
A sequel song, "Till I Die: Part II", was released and features fellow Cleveland based hip-hop group Bone Thugs-n-Harmony as well as rappers French Montana, Yo Gotti and Ray Cash.

== Music video ==
The video was directed by Casey McPerry and MGK himself, filmed in Cleveland, Ohio and premiered on MGK's YouTube channel on January 6, 2015. The video depicts MGK rapping to his hometown and Cleveland rapper Billard, as well as MGK's daughter, made cameo appearances in the video. The music video has over 133 million views as of September 2023

A music video for the sequel was released on WorldStarHipHop on June 4, 2015 and amassed over 4 million views on the content aggregator site, while getting over 18 million views on their YouTube channel;

== In popular culture ==
The song has been used as walkout music for UFC fighter Stipe Miocic since 2015. Miocic chose the song due to the two men's shared Cleveland heritage. A new version of the song is featured on the soundtrack for NBA 2K16.

== Charts ==
Chart (2015)	Peak position
US Bubbling Under Hot 100 (Billboard)	4
US Hot R&B/Hip-Hop Songs (Billboard)	32
US Hot Rap Songs (Billboard)	24

== Certifications ==
Region	Certification	Certified units/sales
New Zealand (RMNZ)	Gold	15,000^{‡}
United States (RIAA)	Platinum	1,000,000^{‡}
^{‡} Sales+streaming figures based on certification alone.
