= Half Naked & Almost Famous =

EP by Machine Gun Kelly
- Released: March 20, 2012
- Recorded: 2011
- Genre: Hip-hop
- Length: 17:01
- Labels: Bad Boy, Interscope
- Producers: Sean "Diddy" Combs (exec.), MGK (also exec.), Harve Pierre (co-exec.), James McMillan (co-exec.), GB Hitz, J. R. Rotem, Slim Gudz, Aliby, J.U.S.T.I.C.E. League, Alex KickDrum, Southside, Michael "Lil Mike" Crawford

Machine Gun Kelly chronology
Rage Pack (2011)	Half Naked & Almost Famous (2012)	Lace Up (2012)

Singles from Half Naked & Almost Famous
- 1. "Wild Boy" Released: September 27, 2011

Half Naked & Almost Famous is the major label debut extended play (EP) by American rapper Machine Gun Kelly. It was released on March 20, 2012, under Bad Boy and Interscope Records.

== Critical reception ==
Professional ratings
Review scores
Source	Rating
AllMusic	3.5/5 stars
HipHopDX	3/5

David Jeffries of AllMusic described Half Naked & Almost Famous as "one well-rounded EP", additionally adding, "Half Naked & Almost Famous is a desirable, quick glimpse of a scrappy mixtape maven successfully going legit." Jesse Fairfax of HipHopDX said, "Half Naked & Almost Famous comes as no surprise to the Cleveland native's already accrued widespread loyalists. Despite maintenance of his undeniable following, MGK remains an enigma of sorts as he has yet to carve out a uniquely identifiable persona. With any hopes, gradual maturity will find his own voice flourishing as he takes a bit of creative license emulating his crunk influences at present."

== Commercial performance ==
In the United States, the EP debuted at number 46 on the Billboard 200, with first-week sales of 8,500 copies. As of August 2012, the EP has sold 36,500 copies in the United States.

== Track listing ==
No.	Title	Writer(s)	Producer(s)	Length
1.	"Warning Shot" (featuring Cassie)	Richard Baker, J. R. Rotem, P. Ring, Jack Bevan, Edwin Congreave, Walter Gervers, Yannis Philippakis, Jimmy Smith	J. R. Rotem, Aliby (co.)	3:20
2.	"Wild Boy" (featuring Waka Flocka Flame)	Baker, Juaquin Malphurs, Joshua Luellen, Jarrett Mines De'Andre Langford	GB Hitz, Southside	3:49
3.	"See My Tears"	Baker, Erik Ortiz, Kevin Crowe, Kenny Bartolomei, Adrian Broekhuyse, Benno de Goeij, Cathy Burton, Raz Nitzan	J.U.S.T.I.C.E. League	4:09
4.	"Half Naked & Almost Famous"	Baker, Alex Fitts, Matt Penttila, Thomas Powers, Alisa Xayalith, Aaron Short	MGK, Slim Gudz, Alex KickDrum	2:51
5.	"EST 4 Life" (featuring Dubo & DJ Xplosive)	Baker, Stuart Pflaum, Michael Crawford	Slim Gudz, Michael "Lil Mike" Crawford	2:52
Total length:				17:01

Sample credits

- "See My Tears" contains a sample of "Rain" as performed by Armin van Buuren and Cathy Burton.
- "Half Naked & Almost Famous" contains a sample of "Young Blood" as performed by The Naked and Famous.
- "Warning Shot" contains elements of "Electric Bloom", written by Jack Bevan, Edwin Congreave, Walter Gervers, Yannis Philippakis and Jimmy Smith, performed by Foals.

== Charts ==
Chart performance for Half Naked & Almost Famous
Chart (2012)	Peak position
US Billboard 200	46
US Top R&B/Hip-Hop Albums (Billboard)	10
