= Lace Up =

- Standard cover art for the album, deluxe version features the same cover with a red background

Studio album by Machine Gun Kelly
- Released: October 9, 2012
- Recorded: 2010–2012
- Genre: Hip hop
- Length: 49:41
- Labels: EST 19XX; Bad Boy; Interscope
- Producers: Diddy (exec.); MGK (also exec.); Harve Pierre (co-exec.); James McMillan (co-exec.); Alex da Kid; Alex Kickdrum; Aliby; Anna Yvette; Boi-1da; Dame Grease; Snaz; Jazzfeezy; Drumma Boy; Frequency; GB Hitz; J.R. Rotem; J.U.S.T.I.C.E. League; JP Did This 1; JRB; Ilyn Nathaniel; Rami Beatz; Silent Mike; Slim Gudz; Southside; Swirv; Syk Sense; Woodro Skillson

Machine Gun Kelly chronology
Half Naked & Almost Famous (2012)	Lace Up (2012)	Black Flag (2013)

Singles from Lace Up
- 1. "Wild Boy" Released: September 27, 2011; 2. "Invincible" Released: April 24, 2012; 3. "Hold On (Shut Up)" Released: August 6, 2012

Lace Up is the debut studio album by American rapper Machine Gun Kelly. It was released on October 9, 2012, by Bad Boy Records and Interscope Records. Puff Daddy, who served as the executive producer on the album, enlisted the guest appearances from Cassie, DMX, Planet VI and Avenged Sevenfold; as well as the production that was provided by Alex da Kid, JP Did This 1 and J.R. Rotem, among others. The album was supported by four singles: "Wild Boy" featuring Waka Flocka Flame, "Invincible" featuring Ester Dean, and "Hold On (Shut Up)" featuring Young Jeezy, along with a promotional single, "Stereo" featuring Alex Fitts.

Reviews for the record were generally positive, but critics felt that it was a disappointment, compared to his previous mixtapes. Lace Up debuted at number four on the Billboard 200, with first-week sales of 57,000 copies in the United States. It was certified gold by the Recording Industry Association of America (RIAA), denoting sales of over 500,000 copies. Kelly embarked on the No Class Tour in 2014 to promote the album.

== Singles ==
The album's lead single, "Wild Boy" was released on September 27, 2011. The song features guest vocals from fellow American rapper Waka Flocka Flame, with production being provided by GB Hitz and Southside. It was initially featured on his fourth mixtape, Rage Pack (2011), and on his debut EP, Half Naked & Almost Famous (2012). The song debuted at number 98 on the US Billboard Hot 100 on the week of January 28, 2012, and number 49 on the Hot R&B/Hip-Hop Songs chart. It serves as his first song to be charted on both Billboard charts.

The album's second single, "Invincible" was released to digital retailers in the United States on April 24, 2012, and was solicited to rhythmic contemporary radio and contemporary hit radio on May 15 to July 31, 2012, respectively. The song features guest vocals from American singer-songwriter Ester Dean, and was produced by British producer Alex da Kid. MGK shot a music video for the single, which features an appearance from the singer Ester Dean, and uploaded the video on YouTube under his VEVO account, on June 3, 2012.

"Hold On (Shut Up)" featuring Young Jeezy, was released as the album's third single on August 6, 2012. The music video was released on November 19, 2012.

=== Promotional singles ===
On September 20, 2012, "Stereo" was released with an accompanying music video, as the album's promotional single (although this track was formerly part of the mixtape with same title as the album). The song features guest vocals from Alex Fitts. The track would also be included, alongside "Invincible" and "Hold On (Shut Up)", as part of the MGK's Music Unlimited exclusive EP, titled Lace Up - The Prelude (released on October 2, 2012).

== Tour ==
In 2014, Kelly went on a 33-city fall United States tour to promote the album, beginning on September 7 at Club Elevation in Casper, Wyoming and ending on October 31 at the Bismarck Civic Center in Bismarck, North Dakota. Limp Bizkit was a supporting act on select dates.

== Critical reception ==
Professional ratings
Aggregate scores
Source	Rating
Metacritic	69/100
Review scores
Source	Rating
AllMusic	4/5 stars
DJBooth	3.5/5 stars
HipHopDX	3/5 stars
Rolling Stone	3/5 stars
Spin	5/10
XXL	4/5 (XL)

Lace Up received favorable reviews but music critics found the record overall uneven, compared to Kelly's previous mixtapes. At Metacritic, which assigns a normalized rating out of 100 to reviews from mainstream critics, the album received average score of 69, based on 6 reviews which indicates generally favourable reviews. Adam Fleischer of XXL praised the production throughout the album and MGK for being consistent with his rapid-fire flow concluding with, "though he may no longer be quite the underdog he once was, rapping like it—at least for now—still works." Fred Thomas of AllMusic also praised the album for its production and putting MGK in the spotlight, calling it "a beast of a debut, and some of the heaviest mainstream-friendly hip-hop happening in 2012, a picture of young energy at its zenith."

Edwin Ortiz of HipHopDX gave a mixed review of the album, praising tracks like "Edge of Destruction" and "D3mons" for their intensity but found "Invincible" and "All We Have" put MGK into "industry purgatory." He concluded with, "Lace Up is an imbalanced project that fails to establish MGK's grand message. His debut is decent at best, with hope that his following projects yield better results." Phillip Mlynar of Spin felt that the special guests throughout the album were more of a hindrance to the main artist saying, "Instead of turning this debut proper into an expansive listen, the guests seem like they're papering over holes in both the music and the message."

== Commercial performance ==
The album debuted at number four on the US Billboard 200, with first-week sales of 57,000 copies. It slid down to number 22 in its second week giving it a total of 65,000 copies. Sliding down to number 37 in week three it sold 10,000 more copies. As of September 2015, the album has sold 263,000 copies in the United States.

== Track listing ==
Album credits adapted from official liner notes.

Lace Up — Standard version
No.	Title	Writer(s)	Producer(s)	Length
1.	"Save Me" (featuring M. Shadows and Synyster Gates)	Richard Baker; Brinton Ewart; Rami Eadeh; Matthew Sanders; Brian Haner, Jr.	Woodro Skillson; Rami Beatz	3:12
2.	"What I Do" (featuring Bun B and Dub-O)	Baker; Joshua Scruggs; Irvin Whitlow; Bernard Freeman; Eric Allen	Syk Sense; Swirv	4:32
3.	"Wild Boy" (featuring Waka Flocka Flame)	Baker; Juaquin Malphurs; Joshua Luellen; Jarrett Mines; De'Andre Langford	GB Hitz; Southside	3:51
4.	"Lace Up" (featuring Lil Jon)	Baker; Christopher Gholson; Jonathan Smith	Drumma Boy	3:02
5.	"Stereo" (featuring Alex Fitts)	Baker; Alex Fitts	Alex Kickdrum	3:55
6.	"All We Have" (featuring Anna Yvette)	Baker; Bryan Fryzel; Anna Masone	Anna Yvette; Frequency	3:27
7.	"See My Tears"	Baker; Erik Ortiz; Kevin Crowe; Kenny Bartolomei; Armin van Buuren; Adrian Broekhuyse; Marinus de Goeij; Raz Nitzan	J.U.S.T.I.C.E. League	4:10
8.	"D3MONS" (featuring DMX)	Baker; Damon Blackman; Rene Hill; Earl Simmons; Klaus Badelt; Lisa Gerrard	Dame Grease; Snaz	4:21
9.	"Edge of Destruction" (featuring Tech N9ne and Twista)	Baker; Michael Brascom; Whitlow; Aaron Yates; Carl Mitchell	Silent Mike; Swirv	5:08
10.	"Runnin" (featuring Planet VI)	Baker; Matthew Samuels; Jazz Singh; Tyler Williams; Timothy Thomas; Theron Thomas	Boi-1da; Jazzfeezy^{[b]}	2:47
11.	"Invincible" (featuring Ester Dean)	Baker; Alexander Grant; Ester Dean	Alex da Kid	3:07
12.	"On My Way"	Baker; Jon Bishop; Whitlow	JRB; Swirv	4:10
13.	"End of the Road" (featuring blackbear)	Baker; Brandon Allen; Matthew Musto	MGK; Slim Gudz	4:04
Total length:				49:41

Lace Up — Deluxe version (bonus tracks)
No.	Title	Writer(s)	Producer(s)	Length
14.	"Half Naked & Almost Famous"	Baker; Allen; Fitts; Thom Powers; Alisa Xayalith; Aaron Short	MGK; Slim Gudz; Alex Kickdrum	2:51
15.	"La La La (The Floating Song)"	Baker; Jesse Woodard IV; Aaron Harry; Trevor Bastow	Chase N. Cashe	3:54
16.	"Hold On (Shut Up)" (featuring Young Jeezy)	Baker; Earl Johnson, Jr.; Jay Jenkins	JP Did This 1	3:30
17.	"Warning Shot" (featuring Cassie)	Baker; J.R. Rotem; Peter Ring; Jack Bevan; Edwin Congreave; Walter Gervers; Yannis Philippakis; Jimmy Smith	J.R. Rotem; Aliby^{[a]}	3:21
Total length:				63:16

Notes

- ^{^[a]} signifies a co-producer
- ^{^[b]} signifies an additional producer
- "Save Me" features additional vocals from M. Shadows.
- "La La La (The Floating Song)" features additional vocals from Betty Idol.

Sample credits, taken from liner notes.

- "See My Tears" contains a sample of "Rain" written and performed by Armin van Buuren and Cathy Burton.
- "D3MONS" contains a sample of "Sorrow" (from the Gladiator soundtrack) written and performed by Lisa Gerrard and Hans Zimmer.

== Personnel ==
Credits for Lace Up adapted from AllMusic.

- Klaus Badlet — composer
- Kenneth Bartolomei — composer
- Chris Bellman — mastering
- Jon "JRB" Bishop — producer
- Blackbear — featured artist
- Snaz — producer
- Boi-1da — producer
- Dame Grease — producer
- Michael "Silent Mike" Brascom — composer, producer
- Leslie Brathwaite — mixing
- Adrian Broekhuyse — composer
- J Browz — bass, guitar
- Bun B — featured artist
- Sean "Diddy" Combs — executive producer
- Kevin "KD" Davis — mixing
- M. De Geoij — composer
- Ester Dean — composer, featured artist
- Aubry "Big Juice" Delaine — engineer
- Steve "Rock Star" Dickey — mixing
- Alexander Diliplane — assistant
- DMX — featured artist
- Drumma Boy — producer
- Dub-O — featured artist
- Rami Eadeh — composer, producer
- Briton "Woodro Skillson" Ewart — composer, producer
- Alex Fitts — featured artist
- Frequency — engineer, producer
- Frequency — engineer, producer
- Brian "DJ Frequency" Fryzel — composer
- Synyster Gates — featured artist, guitar
- GB Hitz — producer
- L. Gerrard — composer
- Stephanie Hsu — creative director
- Anthony "DJ Xplosive" Jackson — scratching
- Jazz Feezy — producer
- J.U.S.T.I.C.E. League — producer
- Alex Kickdrum — producer
- Alex Da Kid — producer
- Byron Kirkland — management
- Lil Jon — featured artist
- Livvi Franc — background vocalist for "Warning Shot"
- MGK — primary artist
- Juaquin Malphurs — composer
- Jonathan Mannion — photography
- Fabian Marasciullo — mixing
- Manny Marroquin — mixing
- A. Masone — composer
- Justine Massa — creative coordinator
- Matthew "Spordy" McMahon — photography
- James McMillan — executive producer, management
- MGK — engineer, executive producer, primary artist, producer
- Mat Musto — piano
- R. Nitzan — composer
- Raz Nitzan — composer
- T-Minus — producer
- Harve Pierre — executive producer
- Planet VI — featured artist
- Justin Sampson — assistant, engineer
- Ben Schigel — mixing
- Phil Schlemmer — engineer
- M. Shadows — featured artist, vocals
- Slim Gudz — engineer, producer
- Southside — producer
- SykSense — producer
- Tech N9ne — featured artist
- Twista — featured artist
- Armin van Buuren — composer
- Ashleigh Veverka — management
- Waka Flocka Flame — featured artist
- Irvin Whitlow — composer, producer
- Anna Yvette — featured artist, producer, vocals

== Chart performance ==
=== Weekly charts ===
Chart (2012)	Peak position
Canadian Albums (Billboard)	14
US Billboard 200	4
US Top R&B/Hip-Hop Albums (Billboard)	2

=== Year-end charts ===
Chart (2012)	Position
US Top R&B/Hip-Hop Albums (Billboard)	64

== Certifications ==
Region	Certification	Certified units/sales
United States (RIAA)	Gold	500,000^{‡}
^{‡} Sales+streaming figures based on certification alone.

== Release history ==
Region	Date	Format(s)	Label
Germany	October 5, 2012	CD, digital download	Bad Boy, Interscope
Canada	October 9, 2012	CD, digital download	Bad Boy, Interscope
United States	October 9, 2012	CD, digital download	Bad Boy, Interscope
