= And I Have Been =

Studio album by Benjamin Clementine
- Released: 28 October 2022
- Studio: CMG Studios, California; Love Electric Studios, London; Metropolis Studios, London; RAK Studios, London
- Length: 37:22
- Label: Preserve Artists
- Producer: Benjamin Clementine

Benjamin Clementine chronology
I Tell a Fly (2017)	And I Have Been (2022)

Singles from And I Have Been
- 1. "Copening" Released: 25 July 2022; 2. "Weakend" Released: 25 July 2022; 3. "Genesis" Released: 30 August 2022; 4. "Delighted" Released: 30 September 2022

And I Have Been is the third studio album by English composer, musician, and poet Benjamin Clementine. It was released through his own label Preserve Artists on 28 October 2022. The album was entirely written, performed, produced, and mixed by Clementine. The album was promoted by the singles "Copening", "Weakend", "Genesis" and "Delighted".

== Background and recording ==
Clementine's second studio album I Tell a Fly was released in July 2017 to critical acclaim, but its stylistic deviation also polarized listeners. In 2019, Clementine was conferred Knight of the Order of Arts and Letters by the French government. In 2021, Clementine made his acting debut in Denis Villeneuve's epic science fiction film Dune.

And I Have Been was conceived during the COVID-19 pandemic while Clementine was living up in the Santa Monica Mountains and in the small town of Ojai, California. In a press release Clementine said he was "confronted with a lot of lessons, complications and epiphanies to do with sharing his path with someone special" during the pandemic. The album was entirely written, performed, produced, and mixed by Clementine. It was written in the Santa Monica and Ojai and recorded in Los Angeles, London, and Clementine's home studio in Ojai.

The album is purportedly the first part in a forthcoming trilogy of albums Clementine finished writing in 2021. According to Clementine, And I Have Been is just "setting the scene" as the "tip of the iceberg". He has suggested that the project will mark the end of his music career, and that he plans to pursue other artistic endeavours such as acting.

== Lyrics ==
Clementine explained in a statement that "Genesis" is about the "constant denial of [his] roots" which inevitably remain in the subconscious, and that he has always had a love-hate relationship with his roots.

== Release ==
On 30 August 2022, Clementine announced And I Have Been, his first new album in five years, calling the album "part one", with a second part set to arrive next year. Leading up to the release of the album, Clementine released four singles: "Copening", "Weakend", "Genesis" and "Delighted".

== Critical reception ==
Professional ratings
Aggregate scores
Source	Rating
Metacritic	79/100
Review scores
Source	Rating
The Daily Telegraph	4/5 stars
Evening Standard	4/5 stars
Far Out	4/5 stars
Financial Times	2/5 stars
The Line of Best Fit	8/10
Loud and Quiet	8/10
Mojo	4/5 stars
The Observer	4/5 stars
Pitchfork	7.5/10
Uncut	7/10

And I Have Been has received critical acclaim. At Metacritic, which assigns a normalised rating out of 100 to reviews from mainstream publications, the album received a score of 79, indicating "generally favorable reviews". Arun Starkey of Far Out magazine described the album as Clementine's greatest, noting specifically the "unfettered genius" of the song "Last Movement of Hope" and metaphorically comparing it to Edward Hopper's paintings and the work of Clementine's childhood hero, Erik Satie. Alex Diggins reviewing in The Daily Telegraph highlights the surprising spirit of domesticity in the album at times noting the song "Auxiliary" depicts Clementine accepting the complexities of fatherhood lightheartedly as he sings to his wife, Flo Morrissey, about the harsh truths of parenthood. He also points out the relentlessness of the song "Lovelustreman" and the expansiveness of the album's closing track "Recommence". Comparing Clementine's previous work, notably I Tell a Fly, Tanatat Khuttapan from Far Out identifies that, his new work stays away from experimentalism but embraced a rather explosive meticulous glide and within it are hidden cryptic like but meaningful occurrences that eventually unveils its head. He also discovers that in lieu of the performances- they are tamed and doesn't leave impression but his lyrics succeeds nonetheless. Ludovic Hunter-Tilley of the Financial Times lamented that, despite the album's "arresting" opening lyrics on "Residue", the songs remain inferior to Clementine's previous work. He also decried the short lengths of some songs and deemed them "less expressive", concluding that Clementine has "underestimated his capabilities." The Observer's Kitty Empire indicated that the album is more straightforward than previous work but painfully elegant. She also briefly touched on the song "Genesis", describing it as an ode to Clementine's complex heritage. Reviewing for Mojo, Tom Doyle felt that the album retained the singer's quirks while offering a more accessible sound. Doyle concludes that, if Clementine retires from music, then And I Have Been finds him seeking outward justification.

== Track listing ==
All tracks are written by Benjamin Clementine.

And I Have Been track listing
No.	Title	Length
1.	"Residue"	3:13
2.	"Delighted"	3:02
3.	"Difference"	1:55
4.	"Genesis"	2:28
5.	"Gypsy, BC"	2:58
6.	"Atonement"	3:17
7.	"Last Movement of Hope"	5:57
8.	"Copening"	2:18
9.	"Weakend"	3:16
10.	"Auxiliary"	2:49
11.	"Lovelustreman"	2:45
12.	"Recommence"	3:24
Total length:		37:22

== Personnel ==
- Benjamin Clementine – vocals, guitars, keyboards, piano, synthesizers, prog drums, string arrangements
- Flo Morrissey – backing vocals
- Axel Ekerman – bass
- Martha Montenegro – Prog Drums
- The Akan Symphony Orchestra

Additional personnel

- Duncan Fuller – engineering
- Andy Hughes – engineering
- John Webber – mastering at Air Studios
- Bruno Bertoli – additional string arrangements on "Difference" and "Atonement"
- Akatre – album artwork
