= A Little More (Machine Gun Kelly song) =

Single by Machine Gun Kelly featuring Victoria Monét

from the album General Admission
- Released: March 30, 2015
- Recorded: 2015
- Genre: Hip hop
- Length: 3:57
- Label: EST 19XX; Bad Boy; Interscope
- Songwriter(s): Colson Baker; Victoria Monét; Tommy Brown; Thomas Lumpkins
- Producer(s): Brown

Machine Gun Kelly singles chronology
"Till I Die" (2015)	"A Little More" (2015)	"Bad Things" (2016)

Victoria Monét singles chronology
"See The Light" (2015)	"A Little More" (2015)	"Do You Like It" (2016)

"A Little More" is a song by American hip hop recording artist Machine Gun Kelly featuring American singer Victoria Monét, released on March 6, 2015 as the second single from his second studio album General Admission. The track was written by Kelly, Monét, Tommy Brown and Thomas Lumpkins, and produced by Brown.

== Music video ==
The official music video was released on May 19, 2015 on Vevo.

== Critical reception ==
AllMusic said that "when he holds Kurt Cobain up as an inspiration during "A Little More," it makes sense".

== Usage in media ==
The song was used in the 2015 video game WWE 2K16.

== Charts ==
Chart performance for "A Little More"
Chart (2015)	Peak position
Canada (Canadian Hot 100)	81
US Bubbling Under Hot 100 (Billboard)	8
US Hot R&B/Hip-Hop Songs (Billboard)	35

== Certifications ==
Certifications for "A Little More"
Region	Certification	Certified units/sales
United States (RIAA)	Gold	500,000^{‡}
^{‡} Sales+streaming figures based on certification alone.
