= Invincible (Machine Gun Kelly song) =

Single by MGK featuring Ester Dean

from the album Lace Up
- Released: April 24, 2012
- Recorded: 2011
- Genre: Conscious hip hop; R&B
- Length: 3:07
- Label: Bad Boy; Interscope
- Songwriters: Colson Baker; Ester Dean
- Producer: Alex da Kid

MGK singles chronology
"Wild Boy" (2011)	"Invincible" (2012)	"Hold On (Shut Up)" (2012)

Ester Dean singles chronology
"Love Suicide" (2011)	"Invincible" (2012)	"I Can't Make You Love Me" (2013)

Music video
- "Invincible" on YouTube

"Invincible" is a song by American musician MGK featuring American singer Ester Dean. The song was released on April 24, 2012, serves as the second single from MGK's debut studio album Lace Up, and was produced by Alex da Kid. The song was also featured as a background song in the popular video game Watch Dogs by Ubisoft in 2014 which later led to the song being increasingly popular.

== Usage in media ==
Invincible was one of the official theme songs for WWE’s WrestleMania XXVIII and has been licensed for 2012 NFL Thursday Night Football. The Cleveland Cavaliers have used the song in their introduction to home games. The song is played over a music video introducing their players featuring MGK in a Cavs jersey with "XX" on it (A part of one of MGK's tattoos) instead of numbers. The song also featured in the HTC Rezound commercial. It was released on December 17, 2011, but only became available to purchase on April 24, 2012 on iTunes. The lyric video was premiered also on December 17, on his Vevo account. MGK performed the song with Skylar Grey (standing in for Ester Dean) and his hype man Slim Gudz at Wrestlemania 28 as part of John Cena's entrance on April 1, 2012. MGK performed the song with Ester Dean and his hype man Slim Gudz on The Tonight Show with Jay Leno, on July 18, 2012.

== Part 2 version ==
Ester Dean posted a Part 2 version of the song in August 2012 onto her SoundCloud page. The Part 2 version features the raps made by MGK removed and replaced with Dean's vocals. Unlike the original song, the Part 2 version has 3 verses.

== Music video ==
MGK shot a video for the single, which featured a cameo appearance from the singer Ester Dean. The video was uploaded on YouTube under his Vevo account, on June 3, 2012. The video, directed by Isaac Rentz portrays the struggle and triumph of everyday people in the clip, which depicts an unexpected pregnancy and neighborhood brawl. In his scenes, MGK rushes to a hospital to check on his daughter, who happens to reunite him with his ex-girlfriend. Singer-songwriter Ester Dean roams the hospital hallways, singing the chorus.

== Credits and personnel ==
- Songwriters – Colson Baker, Ester Dean
- Production – Alex da Kid

== Track listing ==
Digital Single

No.	Title	Writer(s)	Producer(s)	Length
1.	"Invincible" (featuring Ester Dean)	Colson Baker; Ester Dean	Alex da Kid	3:07

== Charts ==
=== Weekly charts ===
Weekly chart performance for "Invincible"
Chart (2021)	Peak position
US Bubbling Under Hot 100 (Billboard)	8
US Hot R&B/Hip-Hop Songs (Billboard)	10
US Rhythmic Airplay (Billboard)	32

== Certifications ==
Region	Certification	Certified units/sales
United States (RIAA)	Gold	500,000^{‡}
^{‡} Sales+streaming figures based on certification alone.

== Release history ==
Country	Date	Format	Label
Canada	April 24, 2012	Digital download	Bad Boy, Interscope
United States	April 24, 2012	Digital download	Bad Boy, Interscope
