= Wild Boy (song) =

Single by Machine Gun Kelly featuring Waka Flocka Flame

from the EP Half Naked & Almost Famous and the album Lace Up
- Released: September 27, 2011
- Recorded: 2011
- Genre: Hip hop; hardcore hip hop; trap
- Length: 3:53
- Label: Bad Boy; Interscope
- Songwriters: Colson Baker; Juaquin Malphurs; Joshua Luellen
- Producers: GB Hitz; Southside

MGK singles chronology
"Wild Boy" (2011)	"Invincible" (2011)

Waka Flocka Flame singles chronology
"She Be Puttin' On" (2011)	"Wild Boy" (2011)	"Round of Applause" (2011)

Music video
- "Wild Boy" on YouTube

"Wild Boy" is a song by American rapper Machine Gun Kelly featuring fellow American rapper Waka Flocka Flame. The song, released September 27, 2011, serves as the lead single from Kelly's debut EP Half Naked & Almost Famous (2012). Produced by GB Hitz and Southside, the song was initially included on Kelly's third mixtape Rage Pack, and later included on his major-label debut studio album Lace Up.

== Critical reception ==
Allmusic gave a mixed opinion on the song, criticizing its "Jackass-inspired dumbness", but commending Kelly's "underdog rhymes, hard-time tales, and heaps of Cleveland love". HipHopDX commented the track saying "MGK is joined by Waka Flocka Flame for a rowdy offering that is entertaining on the surface but lacks creative value". XXL defined the content of the song as "aggressive". Rolling Stone defined the track as "crazy-ass and Bone Thugs-n-Harmony-tinged".

== Music video ==
The music video, directed by Spliff TV and Maybach Music Films, was released to MGK's Vevo on November 16, 2011. The video features cameo appearances from jeweler Johnny Dang, comedian Katt Williams, and rapper Layzie Bone.

The video for the remix was released April 26, 2012.

== Remixes ==
The official remix was released on March 14, 2012, which featured 2 Chainz, Meek Mill, Mystikal, French Montana, Yo Gotti and – the person who which the song is referenced – Steve-O providing an intro. The remix was officially released, removing Steve-O's intro and outro from the single, to digital retailers, like iTunes and Amazon on May 22, 2012, and again with Steve-O's intro and outro to digital retailers on May 29, 2012.

A remix from producer Ricky Luna was included on the soundtrack to the film Project X.

== Credits and personnel ==
Credits adapted from the liner notes of Lace Up.

Recording

- MGK recording: Rage Cage Studios (Cleveland, OH)
- Waka Flocka Flame recording: Daddy's House Recording Studios (New York, NY)

Personnel

- GB Hitz – producer
- Southside – producer
- Justin Sampson – producer, assistant
- Steve "Rock Star" Dickey – mixer

== Charts ==
Chart performance for "Wild Boy"
Chart (2011–2012)	Peak position
US Billboard Hot 100	98
US Hot R&B/Hip-Hop Songs (Billboard)	49

== Certifications ==
Region	Certification	Certified units/sales
United States (RIAA)	3× Platinum	3,000,000^{‡}
^{‡} Sales+streaming figures based on certification alone.

== Release and radio history ==
Country	Date	Format	Label	Ref
United States	September 27, 2011	Digital download	Bad Boy; Interscope	
United States	February 6, 2012	Radio airplay	Bad Boy; Interscope	
