= At Least for Now =

Studio album by Benjamin Clementine
- Released: 12 January 2015
- Recorded: May – August 2014
- Studios: RAK Studios, London
- Genres: Rock opera, spoken word, classical, chamber pop, art pop
- Length: 50:50
- Label: Virgin EMI
- Producers: Benjamin Clementine, Jonathan Quarmby

Benjamin Clementine chronology
Glorious You (2013)	At Least for Now (2015)	I Tell a Fly (2017)

Singles from At Least for Now
- 1. "Condolence" Released: 2015; 2. "Nemesis" Released: 8 January 2015

At Least for Now is the debut studio album by English musician, singer, and poet Benjamin Clementine. It was released through Behind Records in France on 12 January 2015. The album was recorded after Clementine gained critical acclaim with his two previous EPs. Clementine returned to London in the new year to record his album, just as his career was starting to take off. He moved to Kensington High Street with a friend he had met in Tuscany then went back to Edmonton for a period of time until At Least for Now was completed. The album won the 2015 Mercury Music Prize.

At Least for Now went top 10 in France, and has been certified Gold there. The album was also well received by music critics, who praised its mixture of genres and uniqueness.

== Album cover ==
Reviewer Calum Bradbury-Sparvell described the cover, noting, "Clementine stands in a shadowy profile with a Granny Smith cupped in his right hand, as if the Magritte's Son Of Man had finally plucked the offending fruit from his face, but promptly swiveled away from the limelight. An appropriate symbol for this debut LP, during which the mythos of the Edmonton-raised Métro busker, who went from sleeping rough to impressing Macca in a barefoot Later With Jools Holland performance, dissipates only to reveal something more inscrutable: a stranger in a trench coat."

== Critical reception ==
Professional ratings
Aggregate scores
Source	Rating
AnyDecentMusic?	7.4/10
Metacritic	75/100
Review scores
Source	Rating
AllMusic	4/5 stars
The Guardian	4/5 stars
The Independent	4/5 stars
The National	5/5 stars
PopMatters	7/10

Phil Mongredien from The Guardian said At Least for Now was "bold, brave, beautiful, and at times quite brilliant" and that "for the most part these piano-led songs sound unique." Nake Chinen from The New York Times wrote that "As for Clementine's actual voice, it's a strange and frequently stunning instrument, a blade like tenor that can swoop into either a clarion cry or a guttural scowl. The inevitable comparison, notably on a song like "Adios", is to Nina Simone — to her demonstrative clarity of phrase, and the flickering incandescence of her timbre." AllMusic's Timothy Monger said that At Least for Now "makes its case as a one-man show for piano and voice. The compelling British singer/songwriter is dramatic, self-assured, and theatrical in the extreme, boasting a powerful voice that swells to fill the room, which, on this unique record, seems to expand and shrink at the drop of a hat. ... At Least for Now is a pop record of sorts, but completely on his own terms, and like Antony Hegarty (an acknowledged influence) and Rufus Wainwright, two artists who have similar aspirations of pseudo-classical grandeur, Clementine will no doubt be polarizing for many listeners. There is no question, however, of his raw talent, poeticism, and knack for beguiling melodies, and in this oversaturated market, the true mavericks will always rise above the din."

According to Dave Simpson of The Guardian, Clemetine "is reminiscent of Kevin Rowland in that he sounds as if he is singing from the gut, and because he has to. If only he had Rowlands' economy: mannered vocal flourishes complicate the melodies when what's needed is simplicity. The addition of syrupy strings and pedestrian drumming further dilutes the impact of his raw talent. However, when he performs unadorned, melodies dripping from his fingertips, and expressing himself, his voice is difficult to forget."

=== Accolades ===
Publication	Accolade	Year	Rank
The Guardian	The Best Albums of 2015	2015	40

== Track listing ==
All tracks are written by Benjamin Clementine.

No.	Title	Length
1.	"Winston Churchill's Boy"	5:37
2.	"Then I Heard a Bachelor's Cry"	5:08
3.	"London"	4:01
4.	"Adios"	4:17
5.	"St-Clementine-on-Tea-and-Croissants"	1:12
6.	"Nemesis"	5:04
7.	"The People and I"	5:16
8.	"Condolence"	6:30
9.	"Cornerstone"	4:31
10.	"Quiver a Little"	4:42
11.	"Gone"	4:32
Total length:		50:50

French bonus track
No.	Title	Length
12.	"Curriculum Vitæ"	3:53
Total length:		54:43

US iTunes Store bonus tracks
No.	Title	Length
12.	"Edmonton"	4:53
13.	"Mathematics"	3:08
Total length:		58:51

Deluxe edition bonus tracks
No.	Title	Length
12.	"I Won't Complain"	4:40
13.	"Pound Sterling"	4:34
14.	"Riverman" (live)	3:39
15.	"London" (live)	4:03
Total length:		67:44

== Personnel ==
Musicians

- Benjamin Clementine – vocals, piano, keyboard, percussion, foot stamping on "St-Clementine-on-Tea-and-Croissants"
- Alexis Brossard – drums
- Manu Sauvage – bass guitar, keyboard bass
- Jonathan Quarmby – bass guitar on "Quiver a Little"

Production

- Benjamin Clementine – producer
- Jonathan Quarmby – producer
- Engineer – Richard Woodcraft
- Recorded at RAK Studios, London, England except the track "Adios", recorded in Paris at Marlon B Studios
- Cover design – Benjamin Clementine, Akatre, based on The Son of Man painting by René Magritte (front)
- Photography – Akatre (France inner portrait)

== Charts ==
=== Weekly charts ===
Chart (2015)	Peak position
Belgian Albums (Ultratop Flanders)	24
Belgian Albums (Ultratop Wallonia)	12
Dutch Albums (Album Top 100)	13
French Albums (SNEP)	7
German Albums (Offizielle Top 100)	60
Italian Albums (FIMI)	37
Portuguese Albums (AFP)	4
Swiss Albums (Schweizer Hitparade)	22
UK Albums (Official Charts)	37

=== Year-end charts ===
Chart (2015)	Position
Belgian Albums (Ultratop Flanders)	167
Belgian Albums (Ultratop Wallonia)	77
French Albums (SNEP)	57
