= Benjamin Clementine =

British musician (born 1988)

Benjamin Clementine Ordre des Arts et des Lettres
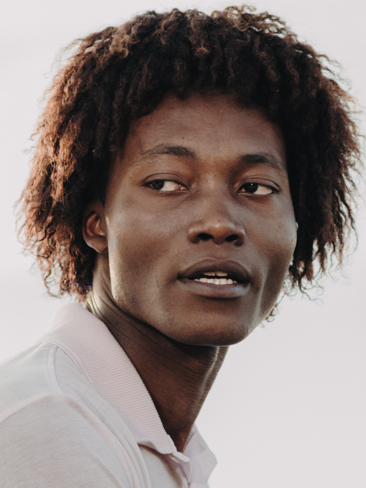
- Clementine in 2022
- Born: Benjamin Sainte-Clémentine; 7 December 1988 (age 37)
- Occupations: Poet; artist; musician; record producer
- Spouse(s): Flo Morrissey (m. 2018; div. 2024)
- Children: 3
- Musical career
- Genres: Avant-garde; experimental pop; contemporary classical
- Instrument: Multi-instrumentalist
- Years active: 2008–present
- Labels: Capitol; Virgin EMI; Barclay; Behind; Preserve Artists
- Website: benjaminclementine.com

Benjamin Sainte-Clémentine (/sən ˈklɛməntaɪn/ sən KLEM-ən-tyne; born 7 December 1988), known as Benjamin Clementine, is a British actor, composer, and musician.

Born and raised in London, Clementine later moved to Paris, where he experienced homelessness for a time. After moving back to London, he released his debut album At Least for Now, which won the 2015 Mercury Prize. In February 2019 he was named a Knight of the Order of Arts and Letters by the French government, in recognition of his contribution to the arts.

Critics have described him as becoming one of the great singer-songwriters of his generation, and the future sound of London, whilst struggling to place his music in any one genre. Clementine's compositions are musically incisive and attuned to the issues of life but also poetic, mixing revolt with love and melancholy, sophisticated lyricism with slang and shouts, and rhyming verse with prose monologues. He often performs topless and barefoot onstage, dressed entirely in black or dark grey, with a long, wool trench coat.

== Early life ==
The youngest of five children, born to parents of Ghanaian descent, Benjamin Clementine grew up in Edmonton, London, with his strict Roman Catholic grandmother. After she died, he moved in with his parents.

The family acquired a piano when Clementine was 11, and Benjamin played it when he could, but his father, who had hoped his son would study law, forbade him to spend time with musical instruments. Clementine could not read sheet music, but in a few months, he started imitating the work of classic composers Erik Satie and Claude Debussy, learned from listening to Classic FM on the radio after "becoming bored" with pop music, and continued to play discreetly for the next five years until his parents' divorce.

=== Relocation to Paris ===
Clementine left school at 16, following which he had a dispute with his family and ended up in Camden Town, London, homeless and in psychological and financial difficulties. He relocated to Paris at age 19, where he spent a number of years busking and playing in bars and hotels in Place de Clichy while sleeping on the streets. He eventually moved to a hostel in Montmartre, where he paid €20 to live in a ten-man bunk-bed room. For the next three years he wrote and composed songs, and playing a half-broken guitar and a cheap keyboard he had acquired. During this period he developed into a cult figure in the Parisian music scene.

After four years of living as a vagabond, he was discovered by an agent, who later introduced him to Matthieu Gazier, who would go on to become Clementine's manager for a period of time. In 2012, whilst playing a gig at the Festival de Cannes, he met Lionel Bensemoun, a business mogul in France, and together set up the record label 'Behind' so that Clementine could record and publish his music. He eventually came to the attention of the French press, who described him as "la révélation anglaise des Francos" ("the English revelation of the "Francofolies" festival"). He was then invited to the Rencontres Trans Musicales of Rennes in France in December 2012 where he performed for the first time on a large stage, and played four nights consecutively. Clementine eventually signed a joint music license contract between Capitol, Virgin EMI and Barclay.

=== Difficulties ===
Before Clementine signed a major deal he closely met and worked with a French tour agent with his independent label in Paris and embarked on a brief European tour playing in high-profile festivals such as the Montreux Jazz Festival in Switzerland, the Montreal Jazz Festival in Canada; and the Eurosonic Festival in the Netherlands. As a result, the North Sea Jazz Festival in 2013 booked Clementine to play, but he failed to attend, lacking funds to purchase a train ticket and having difficulties getting to Rotterdam, eventually trying to walk the 45km barefoot. Despite this, two years later he was offered another spot at the same festival.

In 2014, during the shooting of his music video for "At Least for Now", Clementine fell on a pile of stones in Ireland, badly injuring his elbow, then later cut a toe whilst walking on stones. In March 2015, whilst performing in the middle of a concert in Paris, he cut a finger open and started to bleed, but kept on playing until an audience member threw tissues on the stage.

== Early recordings ==
=== Cornerstone EP, Glorious You EP ===
Clementine's first EP, Cornerstone, was released in June 2013 with three studio tracks. It was re-issued in October 2013 with three additional acoustic tracks recorded for Deezer, a web-based music streaming service. In the same month, on an episode of the BBC television show Later With Jools Holland that also included performances by Paul McCartney, Earth, Wind and Fire, Gary Clark Jr. and the Arctic Monkeys, he performed the EP's title track. The appearance drew strong critical praise, with Paul McCartney encouraging Clementine to continue his musical career. The London Evening Standard's David Smyth, reviewing a gig at the South Bank Centre, said that Clementine's performance reminded him of Nina Simone, particularly as he had covered her hit "Ain't Got No, I Got Life" in a radically different style. Clementine announced further tours, both solo and supporting Cat Power at the Brighton Dome, including an appearance at the O2 Academy in Brixton and at the Rencontres Trans Musicales festival in Rennes, France, where he worked on a special show and performed four nights. Andy Gill on the Independent album review wrote:

This debut EP offers a taste of one of 2014's most promising new talents. With just Benjamin Clementine's impulsive piano figures accompanying his dark, powerful voice, there's a soulful solemnity about these searching songs. But there's also a wealth of imagination at work: "It's a wonderful life, traversed in tears from the heavens," he observes in "I Won't Complain", surveying the emotional turmoil that renders his heart a "melodrama in fact"; while over flurries of piano, his urgent delivery of "Cornerstone" blends the sensitivity of Antony Hegarty with the wracked passion of Nina Simone, admitting loneliness as his "home, home, home", but biting off the word to sound like "hope". A distinctive and impressive new voice.

== Studio albums ==
=== At Least for Now ===
Clementine initially wanted to record his debut album, At Least for Now, straight after his first EP, Cornerstone, but due to contractual dealings with the music industry and his label it was strategically held back for almost two years. During that time, he decided to write his own dictionary, as well as a collection of poetry and classical music pieces. At Least for Now was mainly released across Europe on 12 January 2015. On 13 February 2015 it reached the iTunes Top 10 in Italy, the Netherlands, Switzerland, Belgium, Luxembourg Poland and Greece. In England, it won the prestigious Mercury Music Prize.

At Least for Now largely received critical acclaim. The album holds a 75 out of 100 rating based on 19 critical reviews indicating "generally positive reviews" from Metacritic. David Simpson from The Guardian gave the album 3 stars out of 5, describing the debut as "fascinating but flawed", explaining that it "benefits from the bravery and adventurousness Clementine honed while tackling audiences aboard Parisian trains." Regarding Clementine's vocals, Simpson said: "Channelling influences such as Erik Satie and Antony Hegarty, Clementine is reminiscent of Kevin Rowland in that he sounds as if he is singing from the gut, and because he has to. If only he had Rowlands' economy: mannered vocal flourishes complicate the melodies when what's needed is simplicity. The addition of syrupy strings and pedestrian drumming further dilutes the impact of his raw talent. However, when he performs unadorned, melodies dripping from his fingertips, and letting fly from the heart, his voice is difficult to forget." Phil Mongredien, also reviewing for The Guardian, gave the album 4 stars out of 5, writing that "for the most part these piano-led songs sound unique, the lonely despair of Cornerstone and the arresting lyricism of Condolence signalling an exciting new talent."

=== I Tell a Fly ===
Accompanied by a video shot by photographer Craig McDean and filmmaker Masha Vasyukova published earlier than its official release on 30 June 2017, Clementine composed Phantom of Aleppoville after being affected by the writing of pioneering British psychoanalyst Donald Winnicott. He wrote extensively about children who have experienced bullying in the home and at school, discovering that while the trauma was naturally not comparable in scale to that suffered by children displaced by war, its effects followed similar patterns. Seeing in Winicott's writing a mirror of his own childhood experiences, Clementine chose the title – the "little city of Aleppo" – to symbolise a place where children encounter such bullying. Says Clementine, "Aleppoville is a place where many are bullied if not all, but no one understands nor see why; Phantom". I Tell a Fly finds Clementine exploring new musical territory on the heels of his Mercury Prize-winning debut, At Least for Now (2015). At Least for Now stretched itself across a series of piano ballads with unorthodox structures; I Tell a Fly brings a sense of theatricality and power by using whirling, interwoven instruments throughout the uncompromising release. While At Least for Now looked inward and backward, Clementine's follow-up looks outward and forward-to a changing world, ancient struggles and the individual response. In conversation with David Renshaw, Clementine explains that the origin of I Tell a Fly lies in a disarmingly strange line Clementine found in his American visa: "an alien of extraordinary abilities." He explains, "I was baffled for about ten minutes when I first saw that visa. But then I thought to myself, I am an alien. I'm a wanderer. In most places I've been, I've always been different. And so, I began to think about the story of a couple of birds, who are in love: one is afraid to go further, and the other is taking a risk, to see what happens." On I Tell a Fly, Clementine uses his personal history as a prism through which to view the world around him (and attempt to make sense of both), musically exploring unknown territories while maintaining a lifeblood that could not be mistaken for the work of anyone other than him.

=== And I Have Been ===
And I Have Been is Clementine's third studio album, announced on 30 August 2022, and released on 28 October 2022. "And I Have Been was conceived during COVID," Clementine said in a statement. "Like everyone, I was also confronted with a lot of lessons, complications and epiphanies to do with sharing my path with someone special. ‘Part One’ is just setting the scene, it's the tip of the iceberg which sets the scene for ‘Part Two’, which goes deeper." And I Have Been was recorded primarily in the summer of 2020 in Clementine's home in Ojai, California, before additional recording at Metropolis Studios, London; Love Electric, London; and RAK Studios, London. In an Instagram post about And I Have Been in 2022, Clementine said: "It's my pleasure to share these few new songs with you. Indeed, this is not an album or my third album because that's all recorded and will be released possibly early next year. But these songs I share right now have been nagging me for the past few years and some times you’ve got to get rid to let road. Take or add whatever you feel." All tracks were written and produced by Benjamin Clementine. A 'Part Two' is set to follow in early 2023, with Clementine hinting that he plans to retire from music thereafter to pursue other interests.

== Artistry ==
=== Voice ===
Clementine is a spinto tenor. His voice has been described as warm and graceful, with a bright, full timbre, that ranges from approximately E2-C#6. Writing for The Quietus, Calum Bradbury-Sparvell described Clementine's voice as having the "expressive but exact enunciation of a stage actor, which allows his lyrics to spill and scatter out of sync with his hands in a way which warrants the endless Nina Simone comparisons." He went on to write: "Yet as an atypical singer-songwriter with a strong sense of grandeur, an impressively broad tenor range and more than a dash of dark humour, he also resembles Rufus Wainwright".

=== Instruments ===
Clementine is a multi-instrumentalist and cites a broad range of musical influences: Claude Debussy, Erik Satie, Leonard Cohen, Leo Ferré, Nina Simone, Jake Thackray, Jimi Hendrix, Serge Gainsbourg, Aretha Franklin, Bob Marley, Lucio Dalla, Giacomo Puccini, Luciano Pavarotti, Maria Callas, Georges Brassens and Frédéric Chopin. In a 2015 interview he listed Simone, Nick Cave and Tom Waits as his heroes.

Clementine had little exposure to music whilst growing up, and is self-taught. In his teens he had taught himself to play music by French composers like Erik Satie and Claude Debussy. These influences inspired him to create his own material. He accompanies on hypnotic piano vamps with mostly minimal instruments ranging from little voice breaths, a brushing of coat for percussion as in his song "Edmonton", to a vicious string stride confrontation in his song "Adios".

=== Poetry ===
Clementine states he has mainly been influenced by confessional poets like Sylvia Plath as well as writers such as William Blake, Carol Ann Duffy, James Baldwin, the philosopher John Locke and C. S. Lewis. In an interview with British newspaper The Times with Ed Potton, Clementine expressed his feelings of hating the works of William Shakespeare as a child as it was all his teachers always taught him so he preferably went to his local library to read the other William, William Blake. Whilst in Paris, he discovered French poets such as Charles Baudelaire, Paul Verlaine and Arthur Rimbaud including poet-singers such as Leo Ferré, Georges Brassens, Jacques Brel and Charles Aznavour with whom he sang and recorded the song 'You've got to learn'. He delivers his introspective lyrics about integrity and vulnerability and explores both in everyday experience.

One of his frustrations after returning to the UK was how little ambition, he thinks there is in British song lyrics compared to his experience of French music. Talking to The Guardian journalist Tim Lewis, he said, "it's very important down there (France) because most of the time they [the audience] pay more attention to what the singer says and what they are trying to express."

In his song "Winston Churchill's boy", he rewrites and repurposes the words of Winston Churchill, lamenting "never in the field of human affection had so much been given for so few attention". Writing for The Quietus, Calum Bradbury-Sparvell described the song in the context of Clementine's debut album as "a melodramatic beginning which harks back to the alienation he felt from family and friends on the eve of his emigration to the City of Light," going on to write: "For a Gallic darling, Clementine certainly gazes wistfully across La Manche a lot and one senses that, despite the obvious French influences, there is more of the spurned Londoner in him than the flâneur.

=== Image ===
Clementine plays on stage entirely in black or dark long trench-like woollen coats with no shirt underneath, in barefoot, and Clementine's distinctive androgynous appearance, square-cut, angular padded clothing, manner, and height of 193 cm (6'4) make him a striking figure. In March 2015 Clementine was listed as one of the fifty best-dressed by the Financial Times. Clementine collaborated multiple times with Christopher Bailey. On 17 June 2014 Clementine performed three songs live throughout the Burberry Prorsum Menswear Catwalk show - the first musician to perform live throughout a Burberry show. He performed again on the Burberry menswear show in January 2016. In April 2016, his song "I Won't Complain" was chosen for the Mr. Burberry ad, directed by Oscar-winning director Steve McQueen.

== Performance and appearances ==
On 17 July 2014, Clementine performed at the Montreux Jazz Festival.

An album was scheduled to be released in 2014, but Clementine instead released his second EP, Glorious You, on 25 August 2014.

On 12 October 2014, Clementine performed and spoke at the Observer Ideas at the Barbican Centre, a festival to share ideas to the public, in a line up that included Edward Snowden, David Simon, creator of the HBO series The Wire, and musician Tinie Tempah.

Benjamin Clementine was nominated for the 2015 Mercury Prize and subsequently won. He dedicated his award to the memory of the victims of the terrorist attacks in Paris during the previous week.

On 12 February 2016, Clementine announced a tour of Europe and the United States.

Clementine portrayed the Herald of the Change, a minor character, in the 2021 film Dune.

He played the role of Nanny Asante, partner to Lady Charlotte "Charly" Horniman, in 8 episodes of Season 2 in the Netflix series The Gentleman.

== Personal life ==
Although heterosexual, Clementine has recalled experiencing homophobic bullying at school from pupils who considered him effeminate.

Clementine was married to British singer-songwriter Flo Morrissey, and the couple had their first child, Julian Jupiter Richard Sainte-Clémentine, on Christmas Day 2017. A daughter, Helena Clementine, was born on 29 October 2019, in Ojai, California.

Clementine announced he was officially dating Lana Parilla in September 2026 after attending the world premiere of The Gentlemen season 2 together at the Guild Hall in London.

== Discography ==
=== Albums ===
Album	Details	Peak positions							Certification
Album	Details	UK	BEL (Fl)	BEL (Wa)	FRA	ITA	NED	SWI	Certification
At Least for Now	Released: 12 January 2015; Label: Behind Records / Barclay	37	24	14	7	37	13	22	FRA: Gold
I Tell a Fly	Released: 29 September 2017; Label: Behind Records / Barclay	—	56	33	39	—	—	23	
And I Have Been	Released: 28 October 2022; Label: Preserve Artists	—	—	—	—	—	—	—	

=== EPs ===
EP	Details	Peak positions
EP	Details	FRA
Cornerstone	Released: 2013; Label: Behind Records, (BE001, 2013); Details: 12" vinyl, limited edition. Includes 3 tracks; CD, 2013. Re-issue, includes 6 tracks, including 3 from his Deezer session	—
Glorious You	Released: 2014; Llabel: Behind Records, (BE002, 2014); Details: 12" vinyl, limited edition. Includes 4 tracks; CD, 2014. Reissue includes 4 tracks	45

=== Singles ===
Year	Song	Peak positions	Album / EP
Year	Song	FRA	Album / EP
2013	"Cornerstone"	93	Cornerstone
2013	"London"	115	Cornerstone
2013	"I Won't Complain"	118	Cornerstone
2015	"Condolence"	173	At Least for Now
2015	"Nemesis"	111	At Least for Now
2017	"Phantom of Aleppoville"	—	I Tell a Fly
2017	"God Save the Jungle"	—	I Tell a Fly
2017	"Jupiter"	—	I Tell a Fly
2018	"Eternity"	—	Non-album single
2022	"Copening Weakend"	—	And I Have Been
2022	"Genesis"	—	And I Have Been

=== As featured artist ===
Year	Song	Album
2017	"Hallelujah Money" (Gorillaz featuring Benjamin Clementine)	Humanz

== Filmography ==
Year	Title	Role
2021	Dune	Herald of the Change
2024	Blitz	Ife
2025	In the Hand of Dante	Mephistopheles
2026	The Gentlemen	Nanny Asante

== Television appearances ==
Year	Television show	Performing	Description
2013	Later... with Jools Holland	"Cornerstone" & "Nemesis"	Series 43, Episode 6
2016	The Late Late Show with James Corden	"I Wont Complain"	Season 2 Episode 115
2016	The Tonight Show Starring Jimmy Fallon	"Cornerstone"	The Tonight Show
2017	Later... with Jools Holland	"God Save The Jungle" & "By The Ports of Europe" (also "Jupiter")	Series 51, Episode 1 (also Series 51 (live), Episode 1)
