= Earl St. Clair =

American singer

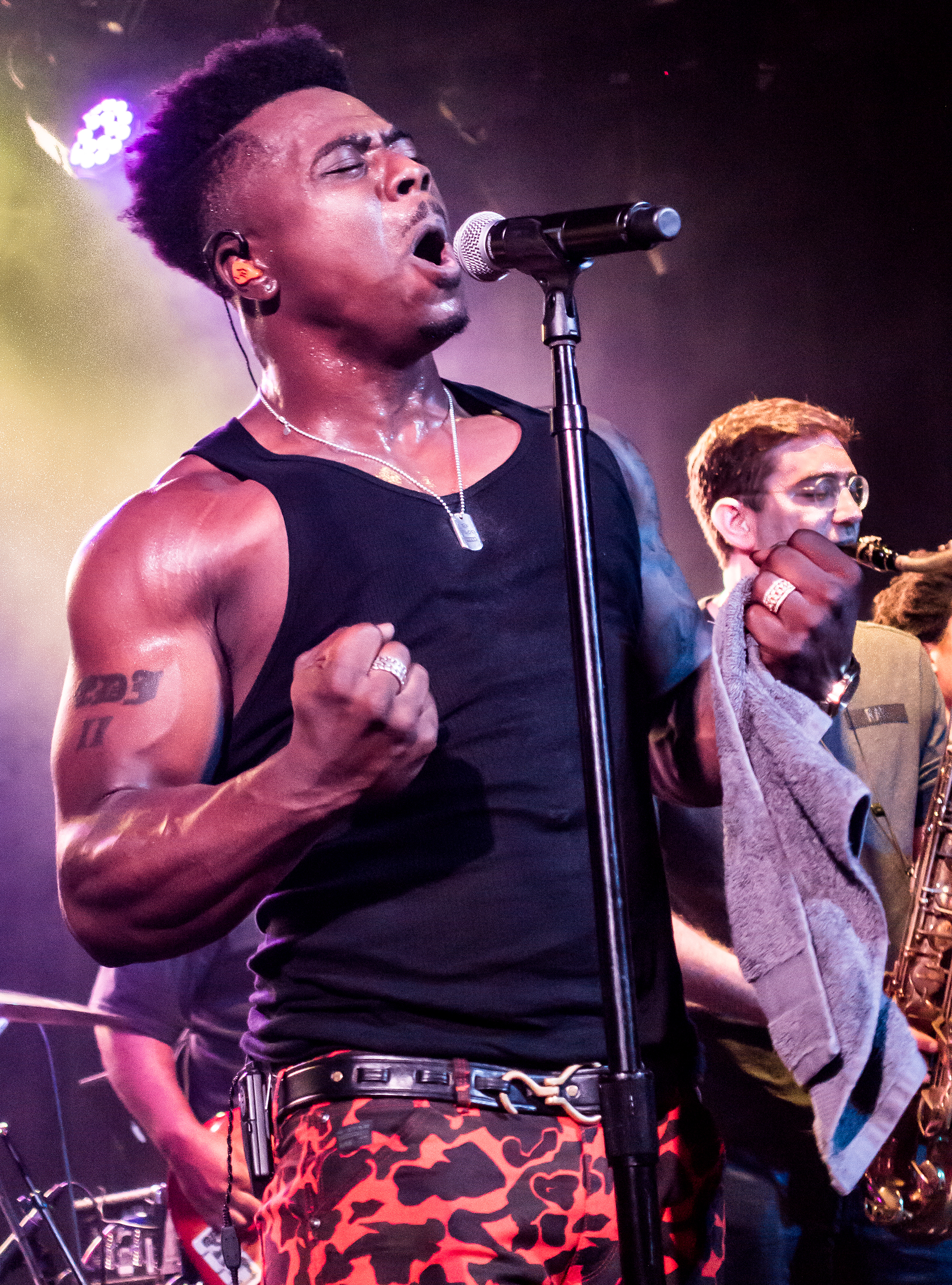
- Johnson performing in 2017

Background information
- Also known as: JP Did This 1
- Born: Earl Johnson II; Cleveland, Ohio, U.S.
- Origin: Montgomery, Alabama, U.S.
- Occupations: Record producer, singer, songwriter

Earl Johnson II, better known by his stage name Earl St. Clair, is an American record producer, vocalist, and songwriter.

== Early life ==
Earl St. Clair was born in Cleveland, Ohio, and grew up between there and Alabama.

== Musical career ==
St. Clair began his career as a record producer, being credited as JP Did This 1.

He expected to primarily work as a producer and co-writer and not as a solo artist. He signed to Def Jam Recordings in 2016.

In June, he made his television debut on The Late Show with Stephen Colbert, performing "Perfect" with fellow Def Jam artist Bibi Bourelly.

In 2015, he co-wrote the song "Pure Grinding" by Swedish DJ Avicii. He also provided uncredited vocals.

In August, he released his debut single, "Man on Fire".

He released his debut album, Songs About A Girl I Used To Know, in 2017.

== Stage name ==
He explained his stage name in an interview with ThisIsRnB: "Earl St.Clair came from the irony from the fact that where I started producing in Cleveland, the street I was working on was St. Clair. It was 129 and St. Clair. Then when I got out to California ... the studio that I was working in was located on St Clair."
