= MGK discography =

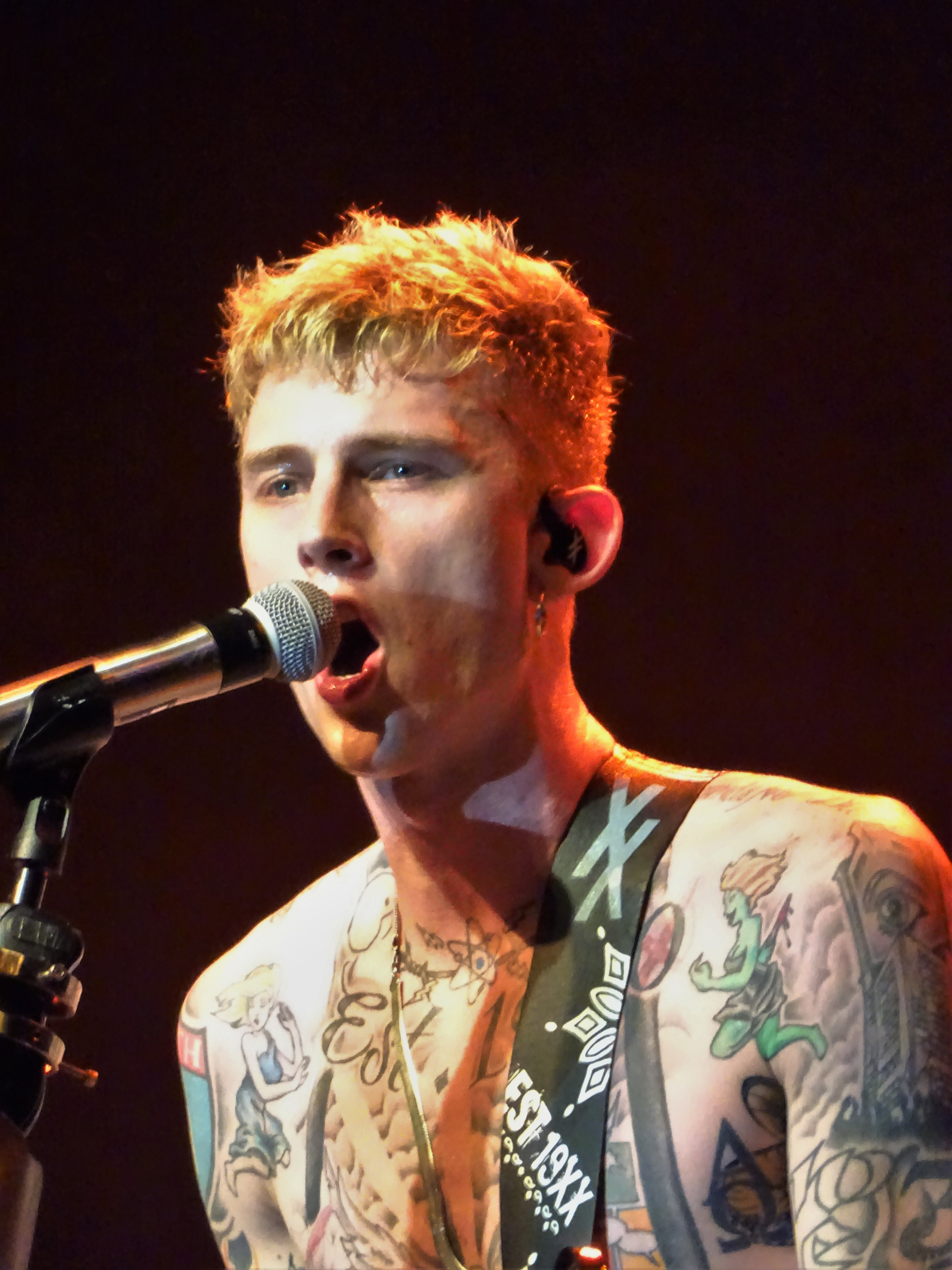
- MGK performing at Summerfest 2018, Milwaukee
- Studio albums: 7
- Singles: 32
- Music videos: 75
- Mixtapes: 11
- Featured singles: 8
- Guest appearances: 31
- EPs: 4

American musician MGK (formerly Machine Gun Kelly) has released seven studio albums, four extended plays (EPs), eight mixtapes, 32 singles (including eight as a featured artist) and 75 music videos. (Note: The original claim of 20 million came from Machine Gun Kelly, who indicated it in an interview with The Breakfast Club.)

== Studio albums ==
List of albums with selected chart positions and certifications
| Title | Details | Peak chart positions | | | | | | | | | | Sales | Certifications |
| Title | Details | US | US R&B/ HH | US Rock | AUS | AUT | CAN | IRE | NZ | NOR | UK | Sales | Certifications |
|---|---|---|---|---|---|---|---|---|---|---|---|---|---|
| Lace Up | Released: October 9, 2012; Label: Bad Boy, Interscope; Format: CD, digital download | 4 | 2 | — | — | — | 14 | — | — | — | — | US: 263,000 | RIAA: Gold |
| General Admission | Released: October 16, 2015; Label: Bad Boy, Interscope; Format: CD, digital download | 4 | 1 | — | 38 | — | 5 | — | 33 | 30 | 120 | | RIAA: Gold |
| Bloom | Released: May 12, 2017; Label: Bad Boy, Interscope; Format: CD, LP, cassette, digital download | 8 | 3 | — | 37 | 36 | 6 | 52 | 26 | 29 | 37 | | RIAA: Platinum; BPI: Silver |
| Hotel Diablo | Released: July 5, 2019; Label: Bad Boy, Interscope; Format: CD, LP, digital download, streaming | 5 | 4 | — | 26 | 37 | 6 | 54 | 23 | 22 | 43 | US: 21,700 (Note: Confirmed album sales sold in the US, for citations view pages commercial performance (here Hotel Diablo).) | RIAA: Gold; BPI: Silver |
| Tickets to My Downfall | Released: September 25, 2020; Label: Bad Boy, Interscope; Format: CD, LP, cassette, digital download, streaming | 1 | — | 1 | 2 | 5 | 1 | 7 | 5 | 10 | 3 | US: 200,000 (Note: Confirmed album copies sold in America. (for citations view Tickets to My Downfall commercial performance.)); UK: 215,854 | RIAA: 2× Platinum; BPI: Gold; MC: 2× Platinum |
| Mainstream Sellout | Released: March 25, 2022; Label: Bad Boy, Interscope; Format: CD, LP, cassette, digital download, streaming | 1 | — | 1 | 1 | 3 | 1 | 4 | 4 | 5 | 2 | US: 62,559 (Note: Confirmed album sales sold in the US.); UK: 118,663 | RIAA: Gold; BPI: Gold; MC: Platinum |
| Lost Americana | Released: August 8, 2025; Label: Interscope; Format: CD, LP, digital download, streaming | 4 | — | — | 3 | 3 | 9 | 30 | 8 | — | 2 | UK: 11,249 | |
"—" denotes a title that did not chart, or was not released in that territory.

== EPs ==
List of extended plays with selected chart positions
| Title | Details | Peak chart positions | | | | | | | Sales |
| Title | Details | US | US R&B/HH | US Rap | AUS | CAN | FIN | NZ | Sales |
|---|---|---|---|---|---|---|---|---|---|
| Half Naked & Almost Famous | Released: March 20, 2012; Label: Bad Boy, Interscope; Format: CD, digital download | 46 | 10 | 9 | — | — | — | — | US: 36,500 |
| Binge | Released: September 21, 2018; Label: Bad Boy, Interscope; Format: Digital download, streaming | 24 | 16 | 14 | 62 | 15 | 47 | 39 | US: 15,700 (Note: Confirmed pure album sales for EP Binge, for citations view pages commercial performance.) |
| Lockdown Sessions | Released: March 2, 2022; Label: Bad Boy, Interscope; Format: Digital download, Streaming | — | — | — | — | — | — | — | |
| Genre: Sadboy (with Trippie Redd) | Released: March 29, 2024; Label: Interscope; Format: Digital download, streaming | 30 | 9 | — | — | 98 | — | — | |
"—" denotes a title that did not chart, or was not released in that territory.

== Mixtapes ==
List of mixtapes, with year released
| Title | Details |
|---|---|
| Stamp of Approval Prelude | Released: 2006; Label: Self-released; Format: Promotional CD |
| Stamp of Approval | Released: October 12, 2007; Label: Self-released; Format: Promotional CD, Digital download |
| Certified | Released: 2008; Label: Self-released; Format: Promotional CD, digital download |
| Homecoming | Released: April 1, 2009; Label: Self-released; Format: Digital download |
| 100 Words and Running | Released: February 11, 2010; Label: Self-released; Format: CD, digital download |
| The Differenter Gang (with Travis Porter and FKi) | Released: September 3, 2010; Label: Self-released; Format: Digital download |
| Lace Up | Released: November 18, 2010; Label: Self-released; Format: Promotional CD, digital download |
| Rage Pack | Released: October 14, 2011; Label: Self-released; Format: CD, digital download |
| EST 4 Life (with Dub-O) | Released: August 13, 2012; Label: Self-released; Format: CD, digital download |
| Black Flag | Released: June 26, 2013; Label: Self-released; Format: CD, digital download |
| Fuck It | Released: July 23, 2015; Label: Self-released; Format: Digital download |
| Blog Era Boyz (with Wiz Khalifa) | Released: May 22, 2026; Label: EST 19XX, Interscope; Format: Digital download, streaming |

== Singles ==
=== As lead artist ===
List of singles, with selected chart positions, showing year released and album name
| Title | Year | Peak chart positions | | | | | | | | | | | Certifications | Album |
| Title | Year | US | US R&B /HH | US Rock | AUS | AUT | CAN | IRE | NZ | SWE | UK | WW | Certifications | Album |
|---|---|---|---|---|---|---|---|---|---|---|---|---|---|---|
| "Alice in Wonderland" | 2010 | — | — | — | — | — | — | — | — | — | — | — | | Midwest Block Starz |
| "Wild Boy" (featuring Waka Flocka Flame or remix featuring Meek Mill, 2 Chainz, French Montana, Mystikal, Steve-O, Yo Gotti ) | 2011 | 98 | 49 | — | — | — | — | — | — | — | — | — | RIAA: 3× Platinum | Rage Pack, Half Naked & Almost Famous and Lace Up |
| "Invincible" (featuring Ester Dean) | 2011 | — (Note: "Invincible" did not enter the Billboard Hot 100, but peaked at number 8 on the Bubbling Under Hot 100 Singles chart.) | 60 | — | — | — | — | — | — | — | — | — | RIAA: Gold | Lace Up |
| "Hold On (Shut Up)" (featuring Young Jeezy) | 2012 | — | 86 | — | — | — | — | — | — | — | — | — | | Lace Up |
| "Till I Die" | 2015 | — (Note: "Till I Die" did not enter the Billboard Hot 100, but peaked at number 4 on the Bubbling Under Hot 100 Singles chart.) | 32 | — | — | — | — | — | — | — | — | — | RIAA: Platinum | General Admission |
| "A Little More" (featuring Victoria Monét) | 2015 | — (Note: "A Little More" did not enter the Billboard Hot 100, but peaked at number 8 on the Bubbling Under Hot 100 Singles chart.) | 35 | — | — | — | 81 | — | — | — | — | — | RIAA: Gold | General Admission |
| "Gone" (featuring Leroy Sanchez) | 2015 | — | — (Note: "Gone" did not enter the Hot R&B/Hip-Hop Songs chart but did peak at number 40 on the R&B/Hip-Hop Digital Song Sales chart.) | — | — | — | — | — | — | — | — | — | | General Admission |
| "Young Man" (featuring Chief Keef) | 2016 | — | — (Note: "Young Man" did not enter the Hot R&B/Hip-Hop Songs chart but did peak at number 43 on the R&B/Hip-Hop Digital Song Sales chart.) | — | — | — | — | — | — | — | — | — | | Non-album single |
| "Bad Things" (with Camila Cabello) | 2016 | 4 | 2 | — | 22 | 48 | 11 | 21 | 11 | 36 | 16 | — | RIAA: 5× Platinum; ARIA: Platinum; BEA: Gold; BPI: Platinum; RMNZ: 2× Platinum | Bloom |
| "At My Best" (featuring Hailee Steinfeld) | 2017 | 60 | — | — | 87 | 71 | 66 | — | — (Note: "At My Best" did not enter the NZ Top 40 Singles Chart, but peaked at number four on the NZ Heatseeker Singles Chart.) | — (Note: "At My Best" did not enter the Swedish Top 100 Singles Chart (Sverigetopplistan), but peaked at number two on the Sverigetopplistan Heatseeker Top 20 Singles Chart.) | — | — | RIAA: Platinum; RMNZ: Gold | Bloom |
| "Trap Paris" (featuring Quavo and Ty Dolla Sign) | 2017 | — | — | — | — | — | 98 | — | — | — | — | — | RIAA: Gold | Bloom |
| "Home" (with X Ambassadors and Bebe Rexha) | 2017 | 90 | 35 | — | 74 | 32 | 43 | 74 | 30 | 99 | 64 | — | RIAA: Platinum; BPI: Gold; IFPI NOR: 3× Platinum; RMNZ: 2× Platinum | Bright: The Album |
| "Loco" | 2018 | — | — | — | — | — | — | — | — | — | — | — | | Binge |
| "Rap Devil" | 2018 | 13 | 10 | — | 45 | — | 9 | 11 | 24 | 82 | 15 | — | RIAA: Platinum; BPI: Silver; RMNZ: Platinum | Binge |
| "Lately" | 2018 | — | — | — | — | — | — | — | — | — | — | — | | Binge |
| "Hollywood Whore" | 2019 | — | — | — | — | — | — | — | — (Note: "Hollywood Whore" did not enter the NZ Top 40 Singles Chart, but peaked at number 31 on the NZ Hot Singles Chart.) | — | — | — | | Hotel Diablo |
| "El Diablo" | 2019 | — | — | — | — | — | — | — | — | — | — | — | RIAA: Gold | Hotel Diablo |
| "I Think I'm Okay" (with Yungblud and Travis Barker) | 2019 | — (Note: "I Think I'm Okay" did not enter the Billboard Hot 100, but peaked at number 4 on the Bubbling Under Hot 100 chart.) | — | 3 | 59 | — | 77 | 56 | — (Note: "I Think I'm Okay" did not enter the NZ Top 40 Singles Chart, but peaked at number 14 on the NZ Hot Singles Chart.) | — (Note: "I Think I'm Okay" did not enter the Swedish Singellista Chart, but peaked at number 18 on the Swedish Heatseeker Chart.) | 90 | — | RIAA: 2× Platinum; ARIA: Platinum; BPI: Platinum; MC: 3× Platinum; RMNZ: Platinum | Hotel Diablo |
| "Glass House" (featuring Naomi Wild) | 2019 | — | — | — | — | — | — | — | — (Note: "Glass House" did not enter the NZ Top 40 Singles Chart, but peaked at number 16 on the NZ Hot Singles Chart.) | — | — | — | RIAA: Gold; BPI: Silver; RMNZ: Gold | Hotel Diablo |
| "Why Are You Here" | 2019 | — (Note: "Why Are You Here" did not enter the Billboard Hot 100, but peaked at number 47 on the Digital Song Sales chart.) | — | 4 | — | — | — | — | — (Note: "Why Are You Here" did not enter the NZ Top 40 Singles Chart, but peaked at number 20 on the NZ Hot Singles Chart.) | — | — | — | | Mainstream Sellout (Life in Pink deluxe) |
| "Bullets with Names" (featuring Young Thug, RJmrLA and Lil Duke) | 2020 | — | — | — | — | — | — | — | — (Note: "Bullets with Names" did not enter the NZ Top 40 Singles Chart, but peaked at number 35 on the NZ Hot Singles Chart.) | — | — | — | | Hotel Diablo: Floor 13 Edition |
| "Bloody Valentine" | 2020 | 50 | — | 3 | 84 | — | 40 | 78 | — (Note: "Bloody Valentine" did not enter the NZ Top 40 Singles Chart, but peaked at number 11 on the NZ Hot Singles Chart.) | — | 51 | 74 | RIAA: 2× Platinum; BPI: Gold; MC: 3× Platinum; RMNZ: Gold | Tickets to My Downfall |
| "Concert for Aliens" | 2020 | — (Note: "Concert for Aliens" did not enter the Billboard Hot 100, but peaked at number 24 on the Bubbling Under Hot 100 chart.) | — | 17 | — | — | — | — | — | — | — | — | RIAA: Gold | Tickets to My Downfall |
| "My Ex's Best Friend" (featuring Blackbear) | 2020 | 20 | — | 2 | 22 | 47 | 26 | 34 | — (Note: "My Ex's Best Friend" did not enter the NZ Top 40 Singles Chart, but peaked at number 6 on the NZ Hot Singles Chart.) | — (Note: "My Ex's Best Friend" did not enter the Swedish Singellista Chart, but peaked at number 15 on the Swedish Heatseeker Chart.) | 30 | 25 | RIAA: 3× Platinum; ARIA: Platinum; BPI: Platinum; MC: 6× Platinum; RMNZ: Platinum | Tickets to My Downfall |
| "DayWalker" (featuring Corpse Husband) | 2021 | 88 | — | 8 | — | — | 62 | 70 | — (Note: "DayWalker" did not enter the NZ Top 40 Singles Chart, but peaked at number nine on the NZ Hot Singles Chart.) | — | 53 | 170 | | Non-album single |
| "Love Race" (featuring Kellin Quinn) | 2021 | — (Note: "Love Race" did not enter the Billboard Hot 100, but peaked at number 2 on the Bubbling Under Hot 100 chart.) | — | 12 | 87 | — | 75 | 64 | — (Note: "Love Race" did not enter the NZ Top 40 Singles Chart, but peaked at number 10 on the NZ Hot Singles Chart.) | — | 56 | 115 | | Mainstream Sellout (Target & Bonus Track Edition) |
| "Papercuts" | 2021 | 79 | — | 9 | 73 | — | 57 | 90 | — (Note: "Papercuts" did not enter the NZ Top 40 Singles Chart, but peaked at number 18 on the NZ Hot Singles Chart.) | — | 74 | 99 | | Mainstream Sellout |
| "Thought It Was" (with Iann Dior and Travis Barker) | 2022 | — (Note: "Thought It Was" did not enter the Billboard Hot 100, but peaked at number 23 on the Bubbling Under Hot 100 chart.) | — | 18 | — | — | 76 | — | — (Note: "Thought It Was" did not enter the NZ Top 40 Singles Chart, but peaked at number 15 on the NZ Hot Singles Chart.) | — | — | — | | On to Better Things |
| "Emo Girl" (with Willow) | 2022 | 77 | — | 9 | 78 | — | 64 | 71 | — (Note: "Emo Girl" did not enter the NZ Top 40 Singles Chart, but peaked at number 11 on the NZ Hot Singles Chart.) | — (Note: "Emo Girl" did not enter the Swedish Singellista Chart, but peaked at number 15 on the Swedish Heatseeker Chart.) | 52 | 91 | RIAA: Gold; MC: Gold | Mainstream Sellout |
| "Ay!" (with Lil Wayne) | 2022 | 82 | — | 8 | — | — | 57 | 92 | — (Note: "Ay!" did not enter the NZ Top 40 Singles Chart, but peaked at number seven on the NZ Hot Singles Chart.) | — | 80 | 92 | MC: Gold | Mainstream Sellout |
| "Maybe" (with Bring Me the Horizon) | 2022 | 68 | — | 6 | 38 | 40 | 36 | 68 | — (Note: "Maybe" did not enter the NZ Top 40 Singles Chart, but peaked at number 12 on the NZ Hot Singles Chart.) | — (Note: "Maybe" did not enter the Swedish Singellista Chart, but peaked at number five on the Swedish Heatseeker Chart.) | 39 | 69 | BPI: Silver; MC: Gold | Mainstream Sellout |
| "GFY" (with Blackbear) | 2022 | — (Note: "GFY" did not enter the Billboard Hot 100, but peaked at number 23 on the Bubbling Under Hot 100 Singles chart.) | — | 12 | — | — | 85 | — | — (Note: "GFY" did not enter the NZ Top 40 Singles Chart, but peaked at number 14 on the NZ Hot Singles Chart.) | — | — | — | | In Loving Memory |
| "More than Life" (featuring Glaive) | 2022 | — (Note: "More than Life" did not enter the Billboard Hot 100, but peaked at number 24 on the Bubbling Under Hot 100 Singles chart.) | — | 12 | — | — | — | — | — (Note: "More than Life" did not enter the NZ Top 40 Singles Chart, but did peak at number 17 on the NZ Hot Singles Chart.) | — | — | — | | Mainstream Sellout (Life in Pink deluxe) |
| "Pressure" | 2023 | — | — | — | — | — | — | — | — (Note: "Pressure" did not enter the NZ Top 40 Singles Chart, but did peak at number 37 on the NZ Hot Singles Chart.) | — | — | — | | Non-album singles |
| "Don't Let Me Go" | 2024 | 76 | — | — | — | — | 75 | — | — (Note: "Don't Let Me Go" did not enter the NZ Top 40 Singles Chart, but peaked at number 15 on the NZ Hot Singles Chart.) | — | 91 | — | | Non-album singles |
| "BMXXing" | 2024 | — | — | — | — | — | — | — | — (Note: "BMXXing" did not enter the NZ Top 40 Singles Chart, but peaked at number 27 on the NZ Hot Singles Chart.) | — | — | — | | Non-album singles |
| "Sun to Me" | 2024 | — | — | 24 | — | — | — | — | — (Note: "Sun to Me" did not enter the NZ Top 40 Singles Chart, but peaked at number 23 on the NZ Hot Singles Chart.) | — | — | — | | Non-album singles |
| "El Pistolero" | 2024 | — | — | — | — | — | — | — | — (Note: "El Pistolero" did not enter the NZ Top 40 Singles Chart, but peaked at number 30 on the NZ Hot Singles Chart.) | — | — | — | | Hotel Diablo: Floor 13 Edition |
| "Lonely Road" (with Jelly Roll) | 2024 | 33 | — | 7 | 66 | — | 25 | — | — (Note: "Lonely Road" did not enter the NZ Top 40 Singles Chart, but peaked at number four on the NZ Hot Singles Chart.) | — | 67 | 62 | BPI: Silver | Beautifully Broken (Pickin' Up the Pieces) |
| "Your Name Forever" | 2025 | — | — | 34 | — | — | — | — | — | — | — | — | | Non-album singles |
| "Come Pick Me Up" | 2025 | — | — | — | — | — | — | — | — | — | — | — | | Non-album singles |
| "Iris" (with Julia Wolf) | 2025 | — | — | 41 | — | — | — | — | — (Note: "Iris" did not enter the NZ Top 40 Singles Chart, but peaked at number 29 on the NZ Hot Singles Chart.) | — | — | — | | Non-album singles |
| "Cliché" | 2025 | 62 | — | 10 | 45 | 42 | 41 | 61 | — (Note: "Cliché" did not enter the NZ Top 40 Singles Chart, but peaked at number 2 on the NZ Hot Singles Chart.) | — (Note: "Cliché" did not enter the Swedish Singellista Chart, but peaked at number two on the Swedish Heatseeker Chart.) | 31 | 80 | BPI: Silver; MC: Gold | Lost Americana |
| "Vampire Diaries" | 2025 | — | — | 22 | — | — | — | — | — (Note: "Vampire Diaries" did not enter the NZ Top 40 Singles Chart, but peaked at number 25 on the NZ Hot Singles Chart.) | — | — (Note: "Vampire Diaries" did not enter the UK singles chart, but peaked at number 84 on the UK Singles Downloads Chart.) | — | | Lost Americana |
| "Miss Sunshine" | 2025 | — | — | 27 | — | — | — | — | — (Note: "Miss Sunshine" did not enter the NZ Top 40 Singles Chart, but peaked at number 19 on the NZ Hot Singles Chart.) | — | — | — | | Lost Americana |
| "Times of My Life" | 2026 | — | — | 20 | — | — | 90 | — | — (Note: "Times of My Life" did not enter the NZ Top 40 Singles Chart, but peaked at number 5 on the NZ Hot Singles Chart.) | — | — (Note: "Times of My Life" did not enter the UK Singles Chart, but peaked at number 81 on the UK Singles Downloads Chart.) | — | | Lost Americana |
| "Fix Ur Face" (with Fred Durst) | 2026 | — | — | 48 | — | — | — | — | — (Note: "Fix Ur Face" did not enter the NZ Top 40 Singles Chart, but peaked at number 24 on the NZ Hot Singles Chart.) | — | — (Note: "Fix Ur Face" did not enter the UK Singles Chart, but peaked at number 64 on the UK Singles Downloads Chart.) | — | | TBA |
| "Girl Next Door" (with Wiz Khalifa) | 2026 | — | — | 44 | — | — | — | — | — (Note: "Girl Next Door" did not enter the NZ Top 40 Singles Chart, but peaked at number 38 on the NZ Hot Singles Chart.) | — | — | — | | Blog Era Boyz |
| "JJK" (with Yuki Chiba) | 2026 | — | — | — | — | — | — | — | — | — | — | — | | TBA |
"—" denotes a title that did not chart, or was not released in that territory.

=== As featured artist ===
List of singles as a featured artist, showing year released and album name
| Title | Year | Peak chart positions | | | | | | | Certifications | Album |
| Title | Year | US Bub. | US Rap | US Rock | CAN | IRE | NZ Hot | UK | Certifications | Album |
|---|---|---|---|---|---|---|---|---|---|---|
| "I Don't Dance" (DMX featuring Machine Gun Kelly) | 2012 | — | 47 | — | — | — | — | — | | Undisputed |
| "Alone" (Sleeping with Sirens featuring Machine Gun Kelly) | 2013 | — | — | 23 | — | — | — | — | | Feel |
| "No More Sad Songs" (Little Mix featuring Machine Gun Kelly) | 2017 | — | — | — | — | 25 | 9 | 15 | BPI: Platinum; RMNZ: Gold | Glory Days: The Platinum Edition |
| "No Reason (The Mosh Pit Song)" (Tech N9ne featuring Machine Gun Kelly and Y2) | 2018 | — | — | — | — | — | — | — | | Planet |
| "Too Good to Be True" (Danny Ávila and the Vamps featuring Machine Gun Kelly) | 2018 | — | — | — | — | — | — | — | | Night & Day (Day Edition) |
| "The Dirt (Est. 1981)" (Mötley Crüe featuring Machine Gun Kelly) | 2019 | — | — | 18 | — | — | — | — | | The Dirt Soundtrack |
| "Sorry Mama" (Phem featuring Machine Gun Kelly) | 2019 | — | — | — | — | — | — | — | | Non-album single |
| "Front Street" (YFL Kelvin featuring Machine Gun Kelly and YFL Pooh) | 2020 | — | — | — | — | — | — | — | | Neva Lookin Back |
| "Sick and Tired" (Iann Dior featuring Machine Gun Kelly and Travis Barker) | 2020 | 15 | — | 3 | — | — | 9 | — | RIAA: Platinum; MC: Platinum; RMNZ: Gold | I'm Gone |
| "Stay Away" (Mod Sun featuring Machine Gun Kelly and Goody Grace) | 2020 | — | — | — | — | — | 27 | — | | Non-album single |
| "Acting Like That" (Yungblud featuring Machine Gun Kelly and Travis Barker) | 2020 | — | — | 16 | — | — | 14 | — | | Weird! |
| "Wanna Be" (Jxdn featuring Machine Gun Kelly) | 2021 | — | — | 25 | — | — | 34 | — | | Tell Me About Tomorrow |
| "Dont Sleep, Repeat" (44Phantom featuring Machine Gun Kelly) | 2022 | — | — | 49 | — | — | — | — | | Non-album singles |
| "Crash First" (Honestav featuring Machine Gun Kelly) | 2026 | 18 | — | 40 | — | — | 11 | — | | Non-album singles |
"—" denotes a title that did not chart, or was not released in that territory.

== Promotional singles ==
=== As lead artist ===
List of singles, with selected chart positions, showing year released, album name and certification
| Title | Year | Peak chart positions | | | | | | | Certifications | Album |
| Title | Year | US | US Rap | US Rock | CAN | NZ Hot | UK | WW | Certifications | Album |
|---|---|---|---|---|---|---|---|---|---|---|
| "Mind of a Stoner" (featuring Wiz Khalifa) | 2013 | — | — | — | — | — | — | — | | Black Flag |
| "No Miracles" (Kid Ink featuring Elle Varner and Machine Gun Kelly) | 2013 | — | 38 | — | — | — | — | — | | My Own Lane |
| "World Series" | 2015 | — | — | — | — | — | — | — | | General Admission |
| "Go for Broke" (featuring James Arthur) | 2017 | — | — | — | — | — | — | — | | Bloom |
| "Habits" | 2017 | — | — | — | — | — | — | — | | Bloom |
| "The Break Up" | 2018 | — (Note: "The Break Up" did not enter the Billboard Hot 100, but peaked at number 42 on the Digital Song Sales chart.) | — (Note: "The Break Up" did not enter the Hot R&B/Hip-Hop Songs chart but did peak at number 13 on the R&B/Hip-Hop Digital Song Sales chart.) | — | — | — | — | — | RIAA: Gold | Bloom |
| "27" | 2018 | — | — | — | — | — | — | — | RIAA: Gold | Bloom |
| "Floor 13" | 2019 | — | — | — | — | 22 | — | — | | Hotel Diablo |
| "A Girl Like You" (with Travis Barker) | 2021 | — | — | — | — | — | — | — | | Paradise City Soundtrack |
| "Bois Lie" (Avril Lavigne featuring Machine Gun Kelly) | 2022 | — | — | 22 | 83 | 15 | — | — | | Love Sux |
| "Make Up Sex" (with Blackbear) | 2022 | 59 | — | 5 | 33 | 3 | 55 | 70 | MC: Gold | Mainstream Sellout |
| "Taurus" (featuring Naomi Wild) | 2022 | — | — | 38 | — | — | — | — | | Taurus |
"—" denotes a title that did not chart, or was not released in that territory.

=== As featured artist ===
List of songs, with selected chart positions and certifications, showing year released and album name
| Title | Year | Peak chart positions | | | | | | Album |
| Title | Year | US | US R&B /HH | CAN | NZ Hot | UK | WW | Album |
|---|---|---|---|---|---|---|---|---|
| "Who I Was" (NF featuring Machine Gun Kelly) | 2025 | 62 | 13 | 57 | 5 | 76 | 151 | Fear |

== Other charted songs ==
List of singles, with selected chart positions, showing year released, album name and certification
| Title | Year | Peak chart positions | | | | | | | | | Certification | Album |
| Title | Year | US | US R&B /HH | US Rock | AUS | CAN | IRE | NZ Hot | UK | WW | Certification | Album |
|---|---|---|---|---|---|---|---|---|---|---|---|---|
| "Lace Up" (featuring Lil Jon) | 2012 | — | 104 | — | — | — | — | — | — | — | | Lace Up |
| "See My Tears" | 2012 | — | — | — | — | — | — | — | — | — | RIAA: Gold | Lace Up |
| "Ocho Cinco" (French Montana featuring Machine Gun Kelly, Diddy, Red Cafe and Los) | 2013 | — | 52 | — | — | — | — | — | — | — | | Mac & Cheese 3 and Excuse My French |
| "Alpha Omega" | 2015 | — | — | — | — | — | — | — | — | — | RIAA: Gold | General Admission |
| "Bad Motherfucker" (featuring Kid Rock) | 2015 | — | — | — | — | — | — | — | — | — | RIAA: Platinum; RMNZ: Gold | General Admission |
| "Let You Go" | 2017 | — | — | — | — | — | — | — | — | — | RIAA: Platinum | Bloom |
| "Candy" (featuring Trippie Redd) | 2019 | — (Note: "Candy" did not enter the Billboard Hot 100, but peaked at number eight on the Bubbling Under Hot 100 chart.) | 49 | — | — | 81 | — | 21 | — | — | RIAA: Platinum; BPI: Silver; RMNZ: Gold | Hotel Diablo |
| "Ecstasy" (Young Thug featuring Machine Gun Kelly) | 2019 | 92 | 40 | — | — | — | — | — | — | — | | So Much Fun |
| "Title Track" | 2020 | — (Note: "Title Track" did not enter the Billboard Hot 100, but peaked at number seventeen on the Bubbling Under Hot 100 chart.) | — | 15 | — | 100 | — | — | — | 197 | | Tickets to My Downfall |
| "Kiss Kiss" | 2020 | — (Note: "Kiss Kiss" did not enter the Billboard Hot 100, but peaked at number fourteen on the Bubbling Under Hot 100 chart.) | — | 14 | — | 99 | — | — | — | 189 | | Tickets to My Downfall |
| "Drunk Face" | 2020 | 91 | — | 9 | — | 72 | — | 15 | — | 120 | RIAA: Gold; BPI: Silver | Tickets to My Downfall |
| "Forget Me Too" (featuring Halsey) | 2020 | 44 | — | 5 | 51 | 33 | 47 | 4 | 40 | 39 | RIAA: Platinum; ARIA: Gold; BPI: Gold; MC: 2× Platinum; RMNZ: Gold | Tickets to My Downfall |
| "All I Know" (featuring Trippie Redd) | 2020 | — (Note: "All I Know" did not enter the Billboard Hot 100, but peaked at number three on the Bubbling Under Hot 100 chart.) | — | 11 | — | 89 | — | 16 | — | 152 | | Tickets to My Downfall |
| "Lonely" | 2020 | — (Note: "Lonely" did not enter the Billboard Hot 100, but peaked at number twenty three on the Bubbling Under Hot 100 chart.) | — | 16 | — | — | — | — | — | — | | Tickets to My Downfall |
| "WWIII" | 2020 | — | — | 35 | — | — | — | — | — | — | | Tickets to My Downfall |
| "Jawbreaker" | 2020 | — | — | 27 | — | — | — | — | — | — | | Tickets to My Downfall |
| "Nothing Inside" (featuring Iann Dior) | 2020 | — | — | 20 | — | — | — | — | — | — | | Tickets to My Downfall |
| "Banyan Tree (Interlude)" | 2020 | — | — | 39 | — | — | — | — | — | — | | Tickets to My Downfall |
| "Play This When I'm Gone" | 2020 | — | — | 21 | — | — | — | — | — | — | | Tickets to My Downfall |
| "Body Bag" (featuring Yungblud and Bert McCracken) (Note: This song only appears on the Sold Out deluxe edition of Tickets to My Downfall.) | 2020 | — | — | 45 | — | — | — | — | — | — | | Tickets to My Downfall (Sold Out Deluxe) |
| "Hangover Cure" | 2020 | — | — | — (Note: "Hangover Cure" did not enter the Billboard Hot Rock & Alternative Songs chart but did peak at number 12 on the Rock Digital Song Sales chart.) | — | — | — | — | — | — | | Tickets to My Downfall (Sold Out Deluxe) |
| "Split a Pill" | 2020 | — | — | — (Note: "Split a Pill" did not enter the Billboard Hot Rock & Alternative Songs chart but did peak at number 18 on the Rock Digital Song Sales chart.) | — | — | — | — | — | — | | Tickets to My Downfall (Sold Out Deluxe) |
| "Can't Look Back" | 2020 | — | — | — (Note: "Can't Look Back" did not enter the Billboard Hot Rock & Alternative Songs chart but did peak at number 17 on the Rock Digital Song Sales chart.) | — | — | — | — | — | — | | Tickets to My Downfall (Sold Out Deluxe) |
| "Misery Business" (with Travis Barker) (Note: This song only appears on the Sold Out deluxe edition and Target Exclusive edition of Tickets to My Downfall.) | 2020 | — | — | 33 | — | — | — | — | — | — | | Tickets to My Downfall (Sold Out Deluxe) |
| "F*ck You, Goodbye" (The Kid Laroi featuring Machine Gun Kelly) | 2020 | 99 | 41 | — | 64 | — | — | 6 | — | 151 | RIAA: Platinum; ARIA: Gold; BPI: Silver; MC: Platinum; RMNZ: Gold | F*ck Love (Savage) |
| "Roll the Windows Up" | 2022 | — | — (Note: "Roll the Windows Up" did not enter the Hot R&B/Hip-Hop Songs chart but did peak at number 21 on the R&B/Hip-Hop Digital Song Sales chart.) | — | — | — | — | 40 | — | — | | Lockdown Sessions |
| "In These Walls (My House)" (featuring Pvris) | 2022 | — | — | 49 | — | — | — | — | — | — | | Lockdown Sessions |
| "Born with Horns" | 2022 | — | — | 22 | — | — | — | 13 | — | — | | Mainstream Sellout |
| "God Save Me" | 2022 | — (Note: "God Save Me" did not enter the Billboard Hot 100, but peaked at number 21 on the Bubbling Under Hot 100 Singles chart.) | — | 19 | — | — | — | — | — | — | | Mainstream Sellout |
| "Drug Dealer" (featuring Lil Wayne) | 2022 | — (Note: "Drug Dealer" did not enter the Billboard Hot 100, but peaked at number 8 on the Bubbling Under Hot 100 Singles chart.) | — | 15 | — | 92 | — | 11 | — | — | | Mainstream Sellout |
| "Mainstream Sellout" | 2022 | — | — | 25 | — | — | — | — | — | — | | Mainstream Sellout |
| "5150" | 2022 | — | — | 23 | — | — | — | — | — | — | | Mainstream Sellout |
| "WW4" | 2022 | — | — | 32 | — | — | — | — | — | — | | Mainstream Sellout |
| "Fake Love Don't Last" (with Iann Dior) | 2022 | — (Note: "Fake Love Don't Last" did not enter the Billboard Hot 100, but peaked at number 14 on the Bubbling Under Hot 100 Singles chart.) | — | 16 | — | 90 | — | 14 | — | — | | Mainstream Sellout |
| "Die in California" (featuring Gunna, Young Thug, and Landon Barker) | 2022 | — (Note: "Die in California" did not enter the Billboard Hot 100, but peaked at number 15 on the Bubbling Under Hot 100 Singles chart.) | — | 17 | — | 95 | — | — | — | — | | Mainstream Sellout |
| "Sid & Nancy" | 2022 | — | — | 26 | — | — | — | — | — | — | | Mainstream Sellout |
| "Twin Flame" | 2022 | — (Note: "Twin Flame" did not enter the Billboard Hot 100, but peaked at number 23 on the Bubbling Under Hot 100 Singles chart.) | — | 20 | — | — | — | — | — | — | | Mainstream Sellout |
| "9 Lives" | 2022 | — | — | 19 | — | — | — | — | — | — | | Mainstream Sellout (Life in Pink deluxe) |
| "Last November" | 2022 | — | — | — (Note: "Last November" did not enter the Billboard Hot Rock & Alternative Songs chart but did peak at number 15 on the Rock Digital Song Sales chart.) | — | — | — | — | — | — | | Mainstream Sellout (Life in Pink deluxe) |
| "Beauty" (with Trippie Redd) | 2024 | — | — | — | — | — | — | 21 | — | — | | Genre: Sadboy |
| "Struggles" (with Trippie Redd) | 2024 | — | — | 45 | — | — | — | — | — | — | | Genre: Sadboy |
| "Time of Day" (with Jelly Roll) | 2024 | — | — | — | — | — | — | 35 | — | — | | Beautifully Broken |
| "Outlaw Overture" | 2025 | — | — | 22 | — | — | — | 26 | — | — | | Lost Americana |
| "Don't Wait Run Fast" | 2025 | — | — | 35 | — | — | — | — | — | — | | Lost Americana |
| "Goddamn" | 2025 | — | — | 34 | — | — | — | 40 | — | — | | Lost Americana |
| "Sweet Coraline" | 2025 | — | — | 43 | — | — | — | — | — | — | | Lost Americana |
| "Indigo" | 2025 | — | — | 46 | — | — | — | — | — | — | | Lost Americana |
| "Starman" | 2025 | — | — | 26 | — | — | — | 35 | — | — | | Lost Americana |
| "Tell Me What's Up" | 2025 | — | — | 45 | — | — | — | — | — | — | | Lost Americana |
| "Can't Stay Here" | 2025 | — | — | 48 | — | — | — | — | — | — | | Lost Americana |
| "Treading Water" | 2025 | — | — | 44 | — | — | — | — | — | — | | Lost Americana |
| "Orpheus" | 2025 | — | — | 50 | — | — | — | — | — | — | | Lost Americana |
| "No Cell Phones in Rehab" | 2025 | — | — | 43 | — | — | — | — | — | — | | Tickets to My Downfall (All Access) |
"—" denotes a title that did not chart, or was not released in that territory.

== Music videos ==
List of music videos, showing year released and director
| Title | Year | Director(s) |
|---|---|---|
| "Chip Off the Block" | 2010 | Unknown |
| "Alice In Wonderland" | 2010 | Unknown |
| "Cleveland" (ft. Dubo) | 2010 | Rob Groulx |
| "I Know" (ft. Ray Jr.) | 2011 | Stephen M. Prewitt |
| "Wild Boy" (ft. Waka Flocka Flame) | 2011 | Spiff TV |
| "Chasing Pavements" | 2012 | T.S. Pfeffer |
| "Wild Boy" (Remix) (ft. Meek Mill, 2 Chainz, French Montana, Mystikal, Steve-O, Yo Gotti) | 2012 | Fredo Tovar, Scott Fleishman |
| "Invincible" (ft. Ester Dean) | 2012 | Isaac Rentz |
| "Highline Ballroom Soundcheck" | 2012 | Spordy19xx |
| "EST 4 Life" (ft. Dubo, DJ Xplosive) | 2012 | Fredo Tovar, Scott Fleishman |
| "Her Song" | 2012 | Spordy19xx |
| "Stereo" (ft. Fitts Of The Kickdrums) | 2012 | Colin Tilley |
| "See My Tears" | 2012 | Spordy19xx |
| "Hold On (Shut Up)" (ft. Young Jeezy) | 2012 | Charlie Zwick |
| "Ratchet" (ft. Dub-O, Ray Jr, Tezo, JP, Pooh Gutta) | 2013 | Purple Films |
| "La La La (The Floating Song)" | 2013 | Spordy19xx |
| "Champions" (ft. Puff Daddy) | 2013 | Spordy19xx |
| "Skate Cans" | 2013 | Spordy19xx |
| "Breaking News" | 2013 | Spordy19xx |
| "All Black Tuxedos" (ft. Tezo) | 2013 | Spordy19xx |
| "Home Soon" | 2013 | Machine Gun Kelly |
| "Swing Life Away" (feat. Kellin Quinn) | 2013 | Charlie Zwick |
| "Mind of a Stoner" (ft. Wiz Khalifa) | 2014 | Charlie Zwick |
| "Halo" | 2014 | Zac Facts |
| "State of Mind" | 2014 | Ian Moore |
| "Sail" | 2014 | Mod Sun |
| "Wanna Ball" | 2014 | Casey McPerry |
| "Raise the Flag" | 2014 | JR Saint |
| "Till I Die" | 2015 | Casey McPerry |
| "Against the World" | 2015 | Machine Gun Kelly |
| "A Little More" (ft. Victoria Monét) | 2015 | Machine Gun Kelly |
| "Till I Die Part II" (ft. Bone Thugs-n-Harmony, French Montana, Yo Gotti & Ray Cash) | 2015 | Machine Gun Kelly, Casey McPerry |
| "Blue Skies" | 2015 | Casey McPerry |
| "Almost" | 2015 | Machine Gun Kelly |
| "World Series" | 2015 | Charlie Zwick |
| "Gone" (ft. Leroy Sanchez) | 2015 | Casey McPerry |
| "Alpha Omega" | 2016 | Ryan Hardy, Ryan Girard |
| "Spotlight" (ft. Lzzy Hale) | 2016 | JR Saint |
| "All Night Long" | 2016 | Mod Sun |
| "4th Coast Freestyle" | 2016 | Machine Gun Kelly |
| "Chill Bill Remixx" (ft. Tezo, Dub-o) | 2016 | Mod Sun |
| "Young Man" (ft. Chief Keef) | 2016 | Ian Moore |
| "Sublime remiXX" | 2016 | Mod Sun |
| "Bad Things" (with Camila Cabello) | 2016 | Hannah Lux Davis |
| "Dopeman" | 2017 | Steven Caple Jr. |
| "At My Best" (ft. Hailee Steinfeld) | 2017 | Hannah Lux Davis |
| "The Gunner" | 2017 | Daniel CZ |
| "Trap Paris" (ft. Quavo, Ty Dolla Sign) | 2017 | Ben Griffin |
| "Let You Go" | 2017 | Ryan Hardy |
| "Merry Go Round" | 2017 | Lauren Dulay |
| "Golden God" | 2017 | Jordan Wozy! |
| "Habits" | 2017 | Jordan Wozy! |
| "The Break Up" | 2018 | Jordan Wozy! |
| "27" | 2018 | Ryan Hardy |
| "Loco" | 2018 | Jordan Wozy! |
| "Rap Devil" | 2018 | Unknown |
| "I Think I'm Okay" (with Yungblud, Travis Barker) | 2019 | Andrew Sandler |
| "Candy" (ft. Trippie Redd) | 2019 | Miles & AJ |
| "El Diablo" | 2019 | Snuffy.NYC, Jimmy Regular |
| "5:3666" (ft. phem) | 2019 | Jordan Wozy!, Machine Gun Kelly |
| "Glass House" (ft. Naomi Wild) | 2019 | Jordan Wozy! |
| "Why Are You Here" | 2020 | Miles & AJ |
| "Bullets With Names" (ft. Young Thug, RJMrLA, Lil Duke) | 2020 | Sam Cahill |
| "Bloody Valentine" | 2020 | Michael Garcia |
| "Concert for Aliens" | 2020 | Mod Sun |
| "My Ex's Best Friend" (ft. blackbear) | 2020 | Van Alpert |
| "Drunk Face" | 2020 | Mod Sun |
| "Forget Me Too" (ft. Halsey) | 2020 | Philip Andelman |
| "DayWalker" (ft. CORPSE) | 2021 | Machine Gun Kelly, Sam Cahill |
| "love race" (feat. Kellin Quinn) | 2021 | Machine Gun Kelly |
| "papercuts" | 2021 | Cole Bennett |
| "Emo Girl" (feat. Willow) | 2022 | Drew Kirsh |
| "ay!" (with Lil Wayne) | 2022 | Hunter Simmons |
| "maybe" (feat. Bring Me The Horizon) | 2022 | Marc Klasfeld |
| "make up sex" (ft. blackbear) | 2022 | Philip Andelman |
| "more than life" (ft. glaive) | 2022 | Colin Tilley |
| "9 lives" | 2022 | Sam Cahill |
| "Pressure" | 2023 | Sam Cahill |
| "Dont Let Me Go" | 2024 | Sam Cahill |
| "Lost Boys" (with Trippie Redd) | 2024 | Sam Cahill |
| "Beauty" (with Trippie Redd) | 2024 | Philip R. Lopez |
| "Time Travel" (with Trippie Redd) | 2024 | Sam Cahill |
| "BMXXing" | 2024 | Sam Cahill |
| "I Think I'm Okay" (Sad Version) (with Yungblud) | 2024 | Sam Cahill |
| "Lonely Road" (feat. Jelly Roll) | 2024 | Sam Cahill |
| "Your Name Forever" | 2025 | Sam Cahill |

== Guest appearances ==
List of non-single guest appearances, with other performing artists, showing year released and album name
| Title | Year | Other artist(s) | Album |
|---|---|---|---|
| "My City" | 2011 | Kid Ink, Killa Kyleon, Red Cafe | —N/a |
| "Boatload (Inhale)" | 2011 | Juicy J | Rubba Band Business 2 |
| "OhMyGod(OMGMGK)" | 2011 | The Madden Brothers | Before — Volume One |
| "On Fire (Drug Dealer Girl Part II) (Rage To This)" | 2011 | Mike Posner | The Layover |
| "Sloppy" (Remix) | 2011 | Ray Jr., Krayzie Bone | —N/a |
| "My Life" | 2012 | The Kickdrums | Follow the Leaders |
| "It's My Party" | 2012 | Roscoe Dash, Lil Jon | 2.0 |
| "Big Bass" | 2012 | Khil Datta | Movementality |
| "Ocho Cinco" | 2012 | French Montana, Diddy, Red Café, Los | Mac & Cheese 3 / Excuse My French |
| "Hell & Back" (Remix) | 2012 | Kid Ink | Rocketshipshawty |
| "Alone" | 2013 | Sleeping with Sirens | Feel |
| "Free The Madness" | 2013 | Steve Aoki | Neon Future I |
| "Weak Stomach" | 2013 | Caskey | The Transient Classics |
| "All for You" | 2014 | French Montana, Lana Del Rey, Wiz Khalifa, Snoop Dogg | Coke Boys 4 |
| "Body Parts" | 2014 | Migos | No Label 2 |
| "Police" | 2014 | Pooh Gutta | Shark Season 2 (The Ratchet Album) |
| "Ratchet" | 2014 | Pooh Gutta, Dubo, Tezo, Ray Jr | Shark Season 2 (The Ratchet Album) |
| "Show Must Go On" | 2015 | Kid Ink, Math Allen | Full Speed |
| "Go Crazy" | 2015 | Waka Flocka Flame | Salute Me or Shoot Me 5 |
| "Same Crew" (Remix) | 2015 | Ray Jr., Dej Loaf, Young Dolph, Troy Ave | —N/a |
| "Party In The 6" | 2015 | Pooh Gutta, Ray Jr | East St Cleveough |
| "Shoot'Em Down" | 2015 | Mod Sun, Blackbear | Look Up |
| "Mention" | 2017 | Ripp Flamez | Project Melodies 2 |
| "Sunrise Trailer Park" | 2017 | Papa Roach | Crooked Teeth |
| "E.Z." | 2017 | Blackbear | Cybersex |
| "No Reason (the Mosh Pit Song)" | 2018 | Tech N9ne, Y2 | Planet |
| "Lift Off" | 2018 | Mike Shinoda, Chino Moreno | Post Traumatic |
| "Bounce Out With That (Remix)" | 2018 | YBN Nahmir | YBN: The Mixtape |
| "Rowdy" | 2019 | Yelawolf, DJ Paul | Trunk Muzik III |
| "Ecstasy" | 2019 | Young Thug | So Much Fun |
| "Pill Breaker" | 2021 | Trippie Redd, Travis Barker, Blackbear | Neon Shark vs Pegasus |
| "Red Sky" | 2021 | Trippie Redd, Travis Barker | Neon Shark vs Pegasus |
| "Bois Lie" | 2022 | Avril Lavigne | Love Sux |
| "Death Around The Corner" | 2022 | EST Gee | I Never Felt Nun |
| "Genie in a Bottle" (Spotify Anniversaries Version) | 2024 | Christina Aguilera | The 25th Anniversary of Christina Aguilera (Spotify Anniversaries Live) |
| "Time of Day" | 2024 | Jelly Roll | Beautifully Broken |
| "My Love" | 2026 | Oki | Reklamacja'47: CD1 |

=== Collaborative ===
| Title | Album details |
|---|---|
| Audio Up presents Original Music from Halloween In Hell | Released: October 2020; Label: Audio Up, Columbia Records; With: Audio Chateau, 24kGoldn, Iann Dior, Phem, Dana Dentata, BigKlit, Tommy Lee |
