= Mainstream Sellout Tour =

2022 concert tour by Machine Gun Kelly

- Tour by Machine Gun Kelly
- Location: North America; Europe
- Associated album: Mainstream Sellout; Tickets to My Downfall
- Start date: June 8, 2022
- End date: October 12, 2022
- Legs: 2
- No. of shows: 42 in North America; 14 in Europe; 56 total
- Supporting acts: Blackbear; Iann Dior; Avril Lavigne; Pvris; Trippie Redd; Willow; Travis Barker; 44phantom
- Box office: $33,680,513

Machine Gun Kelly concert chronology
- No Class Tour (2014); Mainstream Sellout Tour (2022); Lost Americana Tour (2025)

The Mainstream Sellout Tour was a concert tour by American musician and singer-songwriter Machine Gun Kelly. The tour supported his sixth studio album Mainstream Sellout (2022), and visited North America and Europe. The tour began on June 8, 2022, at the newly built Moody Center in Austin, Texas, and concluded on October 12, 2022, at the AFAS Live in Amsterdam. The tour was promoted by Live Nation Entertainment.

The tour featured eight different opening acts, varying by venue, some of which being frequent collaborators of Machine Gun Kelly's. The opening acts include Blackbear, Iann Dior, Avril Lavigne, Pvris, Trippie Redd, Willow, 44phantom, and Travis Barker of Blink-182. Barker is the primary producer of Mainstream Sellout, as well as Machine Gun Kelly's fifth studio album, Tickets to My Downfall (2020).

== Set list ==
This set list is from the concert on June 8, 2022, in Austin, Texas. It is not intended to represent all shows from the tour.

1. "Born with Horns"
2. "God Save Me"
3. "Maybe"
4. "Mainstream Sellout"
5. "Drunk Face"
6. "Concert for Aliens"
7. "All I Know"
8. "Ay!"
9. "Jawbreaker"
10. "More than Life"
11. "Die in California"
12. "Till I Die"
13. "Floor 13"
14. "Papercuts"
15. "Title Track"
16. "Kiss Kiss"
17. "Bloody Valentine"
18. "Roll the Windows Up"
19. "El Diablo"
20. "WWIII"
21. "WW4"
22. "Emo Girl"
23. "5150"
24. "Nothing Inside" (with Iann Dior)
25. "Sick and Tired" (with Iann Dior)
26. "Fake Love Don't Last" (with Iann Dior)
27. "Lonely"
28. "I Think I'm Okay"
29. "Forget Me Too"
30. "Make Up Sex" (with Blackbear)
31. "My Ex's Best Friend" (with Blackbear)
32. "Sid & Nancy"
33. "Twin Flame"

== Shows ==
List of concerts, showing date, city, country, venue and opening acts
Date	City	Country	Venue	Opening acts	Attendance	Revenue
North America
June 8, 2022	Austin	United States	Moody Center	Blackbear, Iann Dior	7,332 (82.66%)	$636,294
June 10, 2022	Houston	United States	Toyota Center	Blackbear, Iann Dior	6,908 (70.68%)	$703,372
June 11, 2022	Dallas	United States	American Airlines Center	Blackbear, Iann Dior	9,620 (84.25%)	$1,004,513
June 14, 2022	Jacksonville	United States	VyStar Veterans Memorial Arena	Blackbear, Iann Dior	8,189 (81.90%)	$678,793
June 15, 2022	Miami	United States	FTX Arena	Blackbear, Iann Dior	7,373 (100%)	$666,108
June 17, 2022	Atlanta	United States	State Farm Arena	Avril Lavigne, Iann Dior	9,586 (86.10%)	$837,026
June 18, 2022	Birmingham	United States	Legacy Arena at BJCC	Avril Lavigne, Iann Dior	7,953 (78.09%)	$649,137
June 19, 2022 (Note: The June 19, 2022 show in Manchester was part of Bonnaroo Music Festival.)	Manchester	United States	Great Stage Park	—N/a	—N/a	—N/a
June 21, 2022	Charlotte	United States	Spectrum Center	Avril Lavigne, Iann Dior	9,991 (91.43%)	$786,992
June 22, 2022	Raleigh	United States	PNC Arena	Avril Lavigne, Iann Dior	8,930 (81.72%)	$678,105
June 24, 2022	Washington, D.C.	United States	Capital One Arena	Avril Lavigne, Iann Dior	11,094 (100%)	$1,108,735
June 25, 2022	Boston	United States	TD Garden	Pvris, Trippie Redd	11,689 (100%)	$1,329,546
June 26, 2022	Camden	United States	Freedom Mortgage Pavilion	Pvris, Trippie Redd	17,598 (93.01%)	$825,030
June 28, 2022	New York City	United States	Madison Square Garden	Avril Lavigne, Iann Dior	13,320 (100%)	$1,340,173
July 1, 2022 (Note: The July 1, 2022 show in Milwaukee was part of Summerfest.)	Milwaukee	United States	American Family Insurance Amphitheater	Avril Lavigne, Iann Dior	—N/a	—N/a
July 2, 2022	Louisville	United States	KFC Yum! Center	Avril Lavigne, Iann Dior	14,702 (100%)	$916,327
July 3, 2022	Detroit	United States	Little Caesars Arena	Avril Lavigne, Iann Dior	12,981 (100%)	$1,066,948
July 5, 2022	Syracuse	United States	St. Joseph's Health Amphitheater	Avril Lavigne, Iann Dior	17,227 (100%)	$655,515
July 6, 2022	Toronto	Canada	Scotiabank Arena	Avril Lavigne, Iann Dior	13,814 (100%)	$1,112,763
July 8, 2022	Kansas City	United States	T-Mobile Center	Avril Lavigne, Iann Dior	12,388 (100%)	$831,299
July 9, 2022	Tulsa	United States	BOK Center	Avril Lavigne, Willow	10,953 (100%)	$808,879
July 11, 2022	Phoenix	United States	Footprint Center	Avril Lavigne, Willow	11,570 (100%)	$909,558
July 13, 2022	Inglewood	United States	Kia Forum	Avril Lavigne, Willow	10,671 (84.08%)	$1,015,619
July 15, 2022	Las Vegas	United States	T-Mobile Arena	Avril Lavigne, Willow	12,672 (88.44%)	$747,079
July 16, 2022	Anaheim	United States	Honda Center	Avril Lavigne, Willow	12,024 (100%)	$983,963
July 19, 2022	Oakland	United States	Oakland Arena	Avril Lavigne, Willow	12,814 (100%)	$638,632
July 21, 2022	Portland	United States	Moda Center	Avril Lavigne, Willow	12,495 (100%)	$699,103
July 22, 2022	Seattle	United States	Climate Pledge Arena	Avril Lavigne, Willow	13,309 (100%)	$728,882
July 23, 2022	Vancouver	Canada	Rogers Arena	Avril Lavigne, Willow	11,078 (100%)	$644,397
July 25, 2022	Spokane	United States	Spokane Arena	Avril Lavigne, Willow	10,255 (100%)	$478,085
July 27, 2022	Fargo	United States	Fargodome	Avril Lavigne, Willow	11,908 (100%)	$714,355
July 28, 2022	Saint Paul	United States	Xcel Energy Center	Avril Lavigne, Willow	13,666 (100%)	$1,049,102
July 29, 2022 (Note: The July 29 2022 show in Chicago was part of Lollapalooza.)	Chicago	United States	Grant Park	—N/a	—N/a	—N/a
July 31, 2022 (Note: The July 31, 2022 show in Montreal was part of Osheaga Festival.)	Montreal	Canada	Parc Jean-Drapeau	—N/a	—N/a	—N/a
August 2, 2022	Pittsburgh	United States	PPG Paints Arena	Travis Barker, Willow	12,618 (100%)	$1,073,233
August 4, 2022	Omaha	United States	CHI Health Center Omaha	Travis Barker, Willow	13,420 (100%)	$696,283
August 6, 2022	West Valley City	United States	USANA Amphitheatre	Travis Barker, Willow	18,086 (100%)	$749,516
August 7, 2022	Denver	United States	Ball Arena	Travis Barker, Willow	12,277 (100%)	$749,516
August 9, 2022	Des Moines	United States	Wells Fargo Arena	Travis Barker, Willow	13,100 (100%)	$611,678
August 10, 2022	St. Louis	United States	Enterprise Center	Travis Barker, Willow	12,270 (100%)	$746,000
August 11, 2022	Noblesville	United States	Ruoff Music Center	Travis Barker, Willow	17,969 (100%)	$690,376
August 13, 2022	Cleveland	United States	FirstEnergy Stadium	Avril Lavigne, Travis Barker, Trippie Redd, Willow, 44phantom	42,086 (100%)	$3,119,581
Europe
September 17, 2022	Cologne	Germany	Lanxess Arena	Iann Dior; 44phantom	—N/a	—N/a
September 19, 2022	Prague	Czechia	Tipsport Arena	Iann Dior; 44phantom	—N/a	—N/a
September 21, 2022	Brussels	Belgium	Palais 12	Iann Dior; 44phantom	—N/a	—N/a
September 23, 2022	Frankfurt	Germany	Festhalle Frankfurt	Iann Dior; 44phantom	—N/a	—N/a
September 25, 2022	Munich	Germany	Olympiahalle	Iann Dior; 44phantom	—N/a	—N/a
September 27, 2022	Milan	Italy	Mediolanum Forum	Iann Dior; 44phantom	—N/a	—N/a
September 28, 2022	Zürich	Switzerland	Hallenstadion	Iann Dior; 44phantom	—N/a	—N/a
September 29, 2022	Paris	France	Zénith Paris	Iann Dior; 44phantom	—N/a	—N/a
October 1, 2022	London	England	OVO Arena Wembley	Iann Dior; 44phantom	—N/a	—N/a
October 4, 2022	Birmingham	England	Utilita Arena Birmingham	Iann Dior; 44phantom	—N/a	—N/a
October 6, 2022	Leeds	England	First Direct Arena	Iann Dior; 44phantom	—N/a	—N/a
October 7, 2022	Glasgow	Scotland	OVO Hydro	Iann Dior; 44phantom	—N/a	—N/a
October 9, 2022	Dublin	Ireland	3Arena	Iann Dior; 44phantom	—N/a	—N/a
October 12, 2022	Amsterdam	Netherlands	AFAS Live	Iann Dior; 44phantom	—N/a	—N/a
Total					485,936	$33,680,513
