= Lost Americana Tour =

2025–2026 concert tour by MGK

- Tour by MGK
- Promotional poster
- Location: North America; Europe; Oceania
- Associated album: Lost Americana
- Start date: November 15, 2025
- End date: July 1, 2026
- Legs: 4
- No. of shows: 67
- Supporting acts: Julia Wolf; Honestav; Wiz Khalifa; Beauty School Dropout; De'Wayne; Mod Sun; Emo Nite
- Producer: Live Nation
- Website: store.machinegunkelly.com/pages/tour

MGK concert chronology
- Mainstream Sellout Tour (2022); Lost Americana Tour (2025–2026)

The Lost Americana Tour was the headlining concert tour by American musician and singer-songwriter MGK. The tour is in support of his seventh studio album, Lost Americana (2025), and is co-headlined for the second North American leg by rapper Wiz Khalifa. It began on November 15, 2025, in Orlando and concluded on July 1, 2026, in Ridgefield.

For the first leg of the tour, MGK played his fifth album Tickets to My Downfall (2020) in full.

== Background ==
MGK's seventh studio album, Lost Americana, was released by EST 19XX and Interscope Records on August 8, 2025. A concert tour was first teased by Universal Music Australia through social media, in which Universal encouraged fans to purchase the album to receive a future tour pre-sale code. The tour was officially announced by MGK and promoter Live Nation on September 17, 2025.

== Set list ==
The following set list was obtained from the concert held on March 10, 2026, at the Utilita Arena in Birmingham, United Kingdom. It does not represent all concerts for the duration of the tour.

1. "Outlaw Overture"
2. "Starman"
3. "Don't Wait Run Fast"
4. "Maybe" / "Wild Boy" / "El Diablo"
5. "Ay!"
6. "F*ck You, Goodbye"
7. "Miss Sunshine"
8. "Goddamn"
9. "I Think I'm Okay"
10. "Title Track"
11. "Drunk Face"
12. "Bloody Valentine"
13. "Forget Me Too"

B-stage

14. "Glass House"
15. "Times of My Life"
16. "Dreamer" / "Crazy Train" (Ozzy Osbourne cover)
17. "Why Are You Here"

Main stage

18. "Iris" (Goo Goo Dolls cover with Julia Wolf)
19. "Treading Water"
20. "Daywalker"
21. "Concert for Aliens"
22. "My Ex's Best Friend"
23. "Jawbreaker"
24. "Nothing Inside"
25. "Twin Flame"
26. "Play This When I'm Gone"
27. "Papercuts"
28. "Lonely Road"
29. "Cliché"
30. "Sweet Coraline"
31. "Vampire Diaries"

== Shows ==
List of concerts, showing date, city, country, venue and opening acts
Date	City	Country	Venue	Opening acts
North America
November 15, 2025 (Note: The November 15, 2025 concert is part of Warped Tour 2025.)	Orlando	United States	Camping World Stadium Campus	—N/a
November 18, 2025	Glendale	United States	Desert Diamond Arena	Julia Wolf
November 20, 2025	Inglewood	United States	Kia Forum	Julia Wolf
November 21, 2025 (Note: The November 21, 2025 concert is part of the 2025 Las Vegas Grand Prix.)	Paradise (Note: Labeled as Las Vegas in promotional material.)	United States	T-Mobile Zone at Sphere Stage (Note: The "T-Mobile Zone at Sphere Stage" is a temporary outdoor stage setup that is assembled adjacent to the Sphere and the Las Vegas Strip Circuit as an entertainment venue for the Las Vegas Grand Prix.)	—N/a
November 23, 2025	Denver	United States	Ball Arena	Julia Wolf
November 25, 2025	Omaha	United States	CHI Health Center	Julia Wolf
November 29, 2025	Calgary	Canada	Scotiabank Saddledome	Julia Wolf
December 1, 2025	Edmonton	Canada	Rogers Place	Julia Wolf
December 4, 2025	Rosemont	United States	Allstate Arena	Julia Wolf
December 6, 2025	Milwaukee	United States	Fiserv Forum	Julia Wolf
December 8, 2025	Hamilton	Canada	TD Coliseum	Julia Wolf
December 10, 2025	Montreal	Canada	Centre Bell	Julia Wolf
December 12, 2025	Boston	United States	TD Garden	Julia Wolf
December 13, 2025	Brooklyn	United States	Barclays Center	Julia Wolf
December 14, 2025	Philadelphia	United States	Xfinity Mobile Arena	Julia Wolf
December 16, 2025	Nashville	United States	Bridgestone Arena	Julia Wolf
December 19, 2025	Tampa	United States	Benchmark International Arena	Julia Wolf
Europe
February 15, 2026	Casalecchio di Reno (Note: Labeled as Bologna in promotional material.)	Italy	Unipol Arena	Julia Wolf
February 17, 2026	Munich	Germany	Olympiahalle	Julia Wolf
February 18, 2026	Vienna	Austria	Wiener Stadthalle	Julia Wolf
February 20, 2026	Kraków	Poland	Tauron Arena	Julia Wolf
February 21, 2026	Prague	Czech Republic	O2 Arena	Julia Wolf
February 24, 2026	Berlin	Germany	Uber Arena	Julia Wolf
February 25, 2026	Hamburg	Germany	Barclays Arena	Julia Wolf
February 27, 2026	Paris	France	Adidas Arena	Julia Wolf
March 2, 2026	Cologne	Germany	Lanxess Arena	Julia Wolf
March 3, 2026	Amsterdam	Netherlands	Ziggo Dome	Julia Wolf
March 5, 2026	London	England	The O_{2} Arena	Julia Wolf
March 7, 2026	Manchester	England	Co-op Live	Julia Wolf
March 8, 2026	Glasgow	Scotland	OVO Hydro	Julia Wolf
March 10, 2026	Birmingham	England	Utilita Arena	Julia Wolf
March 12, 2026	Dublin	Ireland	3Arena	Julia Wolf
Oceania
April 8, 2026	Perth	Australia	RAC Arena	Honestav
April 11, 2026	Melbourne	Australia	Rod Laver Arena	Honestav
April 14, 2026	Sydney	Australia	Qudos Bank Arena	Honestav
April 16, 2026	Brisbane	Australia	Brisbane Entertainment Centre	Honestav
April 18, 2026	Auckland	New Zealand	Spark Arena	Honestav
North America
May 15, 2026	Wheatland	United States	Toyota Amphitheatre	Wiz Khalifa; Beauty School Dropout
May 16, 2026	Concord	United States	Toyota Pavilion at Concord	Wiz Khalifa; Beauty School Dropout
May 17, 2026	Chula Vista	United States	North Island Credit Union Amphitheatre	Wiz Khalifa; Beauty School Dropout
May 20, 2026	Albuquerque	United States	Isleta Amphitheater	Wiz Khalifa; Beauty School Dropout
May 22, 2026	Austin	United States	Germania Insurance Amphitheater	Wiz Khalifa; Beauty School Dropout
May 23, 2026	Houston	United States	Cynthia Woods Mitchell Pavilion	Wiz Khalifa; Beauty School Dropout
May 24, 2026	Dallas	United States	Dos Equis Pavilion	Wiz Khalifa; Beauty School Dropout
May 27, 2026	West Palm Beach	United States	iTHINK Financial Amphitheatre	Wiz Khalifa; Beauty School Dropout
May 29, 2026	Atlanta	United States	Lakewood Amphitheatre	Wiz Khalifa; Beauty School Dropout
May 30, 2026	Charleston	United States	Credit One Stadium	Wiz Khalifa; Beauty School Dropout
May 31, 2026	Charlotte	United States	Truliant Amphitheater	Wiz Khalifa; De'Wayne
June 2, 2026	Raleigh	United States	Coastal Credit Union Music Park	Wiz Khalifa; De'Wayne
June 3, 2026	Gainesville (Note: Labeled as Bristow in promotional material.)	United States	Jiffy Lube Live	Wiz Khalifa; De'Wayne
June 5, 2026	Bangor	United States	Maine Savings Amphitheater	Wiz Khalifa; De'Wayne
June 6, 2026	Hartford	United States	Xfinity Theatre	Wiz Khalifa; De'Wayne
June 9, 2026	Holmdel	United States	PNC Bank Arts Center	Wiz Khalifa; De'Wayne
June 10, 2026	Burgettstown	United States	The Pavilion at Star Lake	Wiz Khalifa; De'Wayne
June 12, 2026	Scranton	United States	The Pavilion at Montage Mountain	Wiz Khalifa; De'Wayne
June 13, 2026	Darien Center	United States	Darien Lake Amphitheater	Wiz Khalifa; De'Wayne
June 14, 2026	Toronto	Canada	RBC Amphitheatre	Wiz Khalifa; De'Wayne
June 16, 2026	Clarkston	United States	Pine Knob Music Theatre	Wiz Khalifa; Mod Sun
June 17, 2026	Grand Rapids	United States	Acrisure Amphitheater	Wiz Khalifa; Mod Sun
June 19, 2026	Maryland Heights (Note: Labeled as St. Louis in promotional material.)	United States	Hollywood Casino Amphitheatre	Wiz Khalifa; Mod Sun
June 20, 2026	Noblesville	United States	Ruoff Music Center	Wiz Khalifa; Mod Sun
June 23, 2026	Kansas City	United States	Morton Ampitheater	Wiz Khalifa; Emo Nite
June 26, 2026	Salt Lake City	United States	Utah First Credit Union Amphitheatre	Wiz Khalifa; Emo Nite
June 27, 2026	Nampa (Note: Labeled as Boise in promotional material.)	United States	Ford Idaho Center Amphitheater	Wiz Khalifa; Emo Nite
June 29, 2026	Vancouver	Canada	Rogers Arena	Wiz Khalifa; Emo Nite
June 30, 2026	Auburn	United States	White River Amphitheatre	Wiz Khalifa; Emo Nite
July 1, 2026	Ridgefield	United States	Cascades Amphitheater	Wiz Khalifa; Emo Nite

== Personnel ==
Musicians

- Colson "MGK" Baker – lead vocals, guitar
- Sophie Lloyd – guitar
- Brandon "SlimXX" Allen – keyboards, backing vocals, musical director
- JP "RookXX" Cappelletty – drums
- Steve "BazeXX" Basil – bass, keyboards
- Justin "GuitarSlayer" Lyons – guitar
- Andrew "No Love for the Middle Child" Migliore – guitar, backing vocals, cello

Dancers

- Delaney Glazer
- Caitlyn Holzer
