= MTV Video Music Award for Best Alternative =

Annual music video award

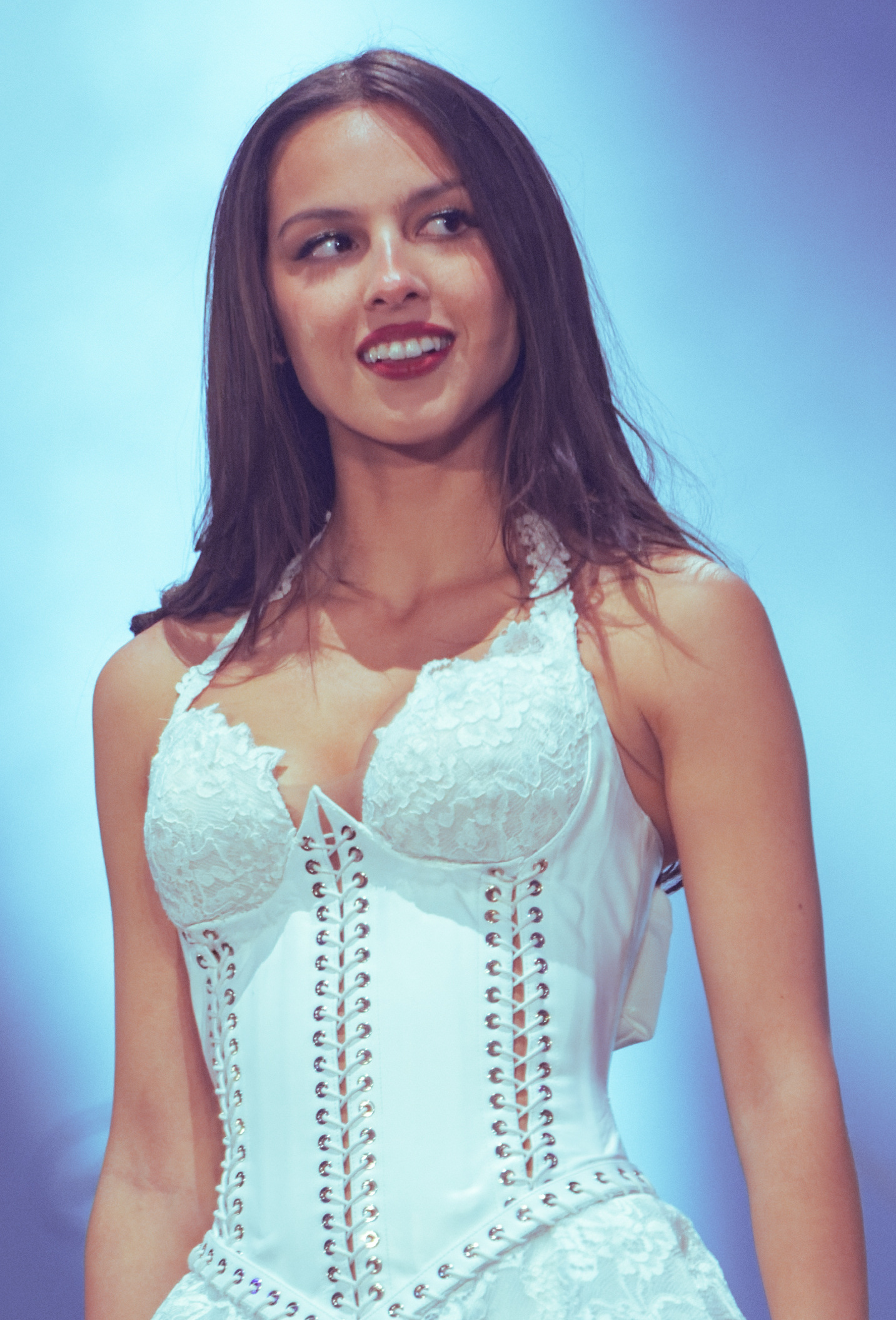
- Olivia Rodrigo is the most recent recipient for "The Cure"
- Awarded for: Alternative rock music videos
- Country: United States
- Presented by: MTV
- First award: 1991
- Currently held by: Olivia Rodrigo – "The Cure" (2026)

Highlights
- Most awards: Nirvana (3)
- Most nominations: MGK (5)
- Website: VMA website

The MTV Video Music Award for Best Alternative is given at the annual MTV Video Music Award. The category was first given out at the 1991 MTV Video Music Awards as Best Alternative Music Video, succeeding the Best Post-Modern Video category.

After the 1998 ceremony, this award was eliminated, and it was not presented until over two decades later, when it was brought back for the 2020 MTV Video Music Awards, under the name Best Alternative. During its discontinuation, artists and videos who would have normally been eligible for this award became eligible for other genre categories, including Best Rock Video.

Nirvana is the biggest winner of this award, winning all three of their consecutive bids for the Moonman from 1992 to 1994. MGK has the most nominations with five.

== Recipients ==
=== 1990s ===
Recipients
Year (Note: Each year is linked to the article about the MTV Video Music Awards held that year.)	Winner(s)	Video	Nominees	Ref.
1991	Jane's Addiction	"Been Caught Stealing"	Jesus Jones – "Right Here, Right Now"; R.E.M. – "Losing My Religion"; The Replacements – "When It Began"	
1992	Nirvana	"Smells Like Teen Spirit"	Pearl Jam – "Alive"; Red Hot Chili Peppers – "Give It Away"; The Soup Dragons – "Divine Thing"	
1993	Nirvana	"In Bloom"	4 Non Blondes – "What's Up?"; Belly – "Feed the Tree"; Porno for Pyros – "Pets"; Stone Temple Pilots – "Plush"	
1994	Nirvana	"Heart-Shaped Box"	Beck – "Loser"; Green Day – "Longview"; The Smashing Pumpkins – "Disarm"	
1995	Weezer	"Buddy Holly"	The Cranberries – "Zombie"; Green Day – "Basket Case"; Hole – "Doll Parts"; Stone Temple Pilots – "Interstate Love Song"	
1996	The Smashing Pumpkins	"1979"	Bush – "Glycerine"; Everclear – "Santa Monica"; Foo Fighters – "Big Me"	
1997	Sublime	"What I Got"	Beck – "The New Pollution"; Blur – "Song 2"; Foo Fighters – "Monkey Wrench"; Nine Inch Nails – "The Perfect Drug"	
1998	Green Day	"Good Riddance (Time of Your Life)"	Ben Folds Five – "Brick"; Garbage – "Push It"; Radiohead – "Karma Police"; The Verve – "Bitter Sweet Symphony"	
1999	—N/a			

=== 2020s ===
Recipients
Year (Note: Each year is linked to the article about the MTV Video Music Awards held that year.)	Winner(s)	Video	Nominees	Ref.
2020	Machine Gun Kelly	"Bloody Valentine"	The 1975 – "If You're Too Shy (Let Me Know)"; All Time Low – "Some Kind of Disaster"; Lana Del Rey – "Doin' Time"; FINNEAS – "Let's Fall in Love for the Night"; Twenty One Pilots – "Level of Concern"	
2021	Machine Gun Kelly (featuring Blackbear)	"My Ex's Best Friend"	Bleachers – "Stop Making This Hurt"; Glass Animals – "Heat Waves"; Imagine Dragons – "Follow You"; Twenty One Pilots – "Shy Away"; Willow (featuring Travis Barker) – "Transparent Soul"	
2022	Måneskin	"I Wanna Be Your Slave"	Imagine Dragons and JID – "Enemy"; Avril Lavigne (featuring Blackbear) – "Love It When You Hate Me"; Machine Gun Kelly (featuring Willow) – "Emo Girl"; Panic! at the Disco – "Viva Las Vengeance"; Twenty One Pilots – "Saturday"; Willow and Avril Lavigne (featuring Travis Barker) – "Grow"	
2023	Lana Del Rey (featuring Jon Batiste)	"Candy Necklace"	Blink-182 – "Edging"; Boygenius – "The Film"; Fall Out Boy – "Hold Me Like a Grudge"; Paramore – "This Is Why"; Thirty Seconds to Mars – "Stuck"	
2024	Benson Boone	"Beautiful Things"	Bleachers – "Tiny Moves"; Hozier – "Too Sweet"; Imagine Dragons – "Eyes Closed"; Linkin Park – "Friendly Fire"; Teddy Swims – "Lose Control (Live)"	
2025	Sombr	"Back to Friends"	Gigi Perez – "Sailor Song"; Imagine Dragons – "Wake Up"; Lola Young – "Messy"; MGK and Jelly Roll – "Lonely Road"; The Marías – "Back to Me"	
2026	Olivia Rodrigo	"The Cure"	Geese – "Taxes"; MGK and Fred Durst – "Fix Ur Face"; Noah Kahan – "The Great Divide"; Sombr – "Homewrecker"; Tame Impala – "Dracula"; Twenty One Pilots – "Drag Path"	

== Statistics ==
=== Artists with multiple wins ===
3 wins

- Nirvana

2 wins

- MGK

=== Artists with multiple nominations ===
5 nominations

- MGK

4 nominations

- Imagine Dragons
- Twenty One Pilots

3 nominations

- Green Day
- Nirvana
- Willow (Note: 1 as a featured artist.)

2 nominations

- Avril Lavigne
- Beck
- Blackbear (Note: Both as a featured artist.)
- Bleachers
- Foo Fighters
- Lana Del Rey
- Red Hot Chili Peppers (Note: 1 nomination from Best Post-Modern Video.)
- R.E.M. (Note: 1 nomination from Best Post-Modern Video.)
- Sombr
- Stone Temple Pilots
- The Smashing Pumpkins
- Travis Barker (Note: Both as a featured artist.)

== See also ==
- MTV Europe Music Award for Best Alternative
- MTV Video Music Award for Best Post-Modern Video
