= Don't Let Me Go (disambiguation) =

"Don't Let Me Go" is a song by American band The Click Five.

Don't Let Me Go may also refer to:

== Music ==
=== Singles ===
- "Don't Let Me Go", 2024 single by MGK

=== Other songs ===
- "Don't Let Me Go", song by Westlife from the 2001 album World of Our Own
- "Don't Let Me Go", song by Cigarettes After Sex from the 2019 album Cry
- "Don't Let Me Go", song by Stephen Sanchez from the 2026 album Love, Love, Love

== Films ==
- Don't Let Me Go, 2013 American fantasy horror film
