= Girl Next Door (MGK and Wiz Khalifa song) =

Single by MGK and Wiz Khalifa

from the album Blog Era Boyz
- Released: May 12, 2026
- Genre: Pop rap
- Length: 3:19
- Label: EST 19XX; Interscope
- Songwriters: Colson Baker; Cameron Thomaz; Valerie Cooper; Roberto Burgos; Brandon Allen; Steve Basil; Andrew Migliore
- Producers: SlimXX; BazeXX; No Love For The Middle Child

MGK singles chronology
"Fix Ur Face" (2026)	"Girl Next Door" (2026)	"Everything Tatted" (2026)

Wiz Khalifa singles chronology
"Soy Así 2" (2026)	"Girl Next Door" (2026)	"Everything Tatted" (2026)

Music video
- "Girl Next Door" on YouTube

"Girl Next Door" (stylized in all lowercase) is a song by American musicians MGK and Wiz Khalifa. Released on May 12, 2026 as the lead single from their collaborative project Blog Era Boyz, its release was accompanied by a music video directed by Sam Cahill and Gianni Paolo, starring Lindsey Fishman, Naomi Baker and Trevor Wallace.

The song was written by the artists themselves alongside producers and longtime MGK collaborators Andrew "No Love for the Middle Child" Migliore, Brandon "SlimXX" Allen and Steve "BazeXX" Basil. It samples the song "KKMJ" by American indie duo Sweet Trip.

== Personnel ==
Credits are adapted from Apple Music.

Musicians

- MGK – vocals
- Wiz Khalifa – vocals
- Brandon "SlimXX" Allen – synthesizer, keyboards
- Steve "BazeXX" Basil – bass, keyboards, synthesizer, percussion drums
- Andrew "No Love For The Middle Child" Migliore – synthesizer, guitar, keyboards, drums, vocals, bass, percussion

Technical

- Shaan Singh – engineer
- Aaron Dahl – mixing engineer
- Joe LaPorta – mastering engineer

== Charts ==
Chart performance for "Girl Next Door"
Chart (2026)	Peak position
Czech Republic Airplay (ČNS IFPI)	13
Estonia Airplay (TopHit)	143
Italy Airplay (EarOne)	31
New Zealand Hot Singles (RMNZ)	38
Nigeria Airplay (TurnTable)	90
San Marino Airplay (SMRTV Top 50)	36
Slovakia Airplay (ČNS IFPI)	61
US Hot Rock & Alternative Songs (Billboard)	44
US Rhythmic Airplay (Billboard)	32
