= Thought It Was =

2022 single by Iann Dior, Travis Barker and Machine Gun Kelly

Single by Iann Dior, Travis Barker and Machine Gun Kelly

from the album On to Better Things
- Released: January 18, 2022
- Genre: Rap rock
- Length: 2:52
- Label: 10K Projects
- Songwriters: Michael Olmo; Colson Baker; Travis Barker; Dan Wilson; Joe Pepe; Kyle Reynolds; Nick Cozine
- Producer: Barker

Iann Dior singles chronology
"Let You" (2021)	"Thought It Was" (2022)	"Be U (216 Hz)" (2022)

Travis Barker singles chronology
"Jingle Bells" (2021)	"Thought It Was" (2022)	"Break My Heart" (2022)

Machine Gun Kelly singles chronology
"Papercuts" (2021)	"Thought It Was" (2022)	"Emo Girl" (2022)

"Thought It Was" is a song by American musicians Iann Dior, Travis Barker and Machine Gun Kelly. It was released on January 18, 2022 as the third single from Dior's second studio album On to Better Things (2022) and is the second collaboration between the three artists, following "Sick and Tired". Produced by Barker, the song contains a sample of "Closing Time" by Semisonic.

== Composition and lyrics ==
An alternative-leaning track, "Thought It Was" samples Semisonic's "Closing Time" and interpolates it in the melody. The lyrics revolve around Iann Dior and Machine Gun Kelly becoming disenchanted with the results of fame and success, through feeling lonely despite being surrounded by people. In the chorus, Dior croons: "Chasing the feeling in the hills at night / City of Angels, but it hurts sometimes / Finally made it, but it don't feel right (Don't feel right) / Don't feel like I thought it would". Kelly talks about taking drugs to cope with his loneliness.

== Charts ==
Chart performance for "Thought It Was"
Chart (2022)	Peak position
Canada Hot 100 (Billboard)	76
New Zealand Hot Singles (RMNZ)	15
US Bubbling Under Hot 100 (Billboard)	23
US Hot Rock & Alternative Songs (Billboard)	18
