= On to Better Things =

Studio album by Iann Dior
- Released: January 21, 2022
- Genres: Emo rap; pop rap; pop-punk
- Length: 36:25
- Label: 10K Projects
- Producers: Aaron Shadrow; Andrew Luce; Brian Lee; Cashmere Cat; Census; Cirkut; Cxdy; Edgard Herrera; Evan Gartner; James Chul Rim; Jasper Harris; KBeaZy; Kevin Gruft; Kinderr; Nash; Nick Long; Nick Mira; Ojivolta; Omer Fedi; Pharaoh Vice; Taz Taylor; Travis Barker

Iann Dior chronology
Still Here (2021)	On to Better Things (2022)

Singles from On to Better Things
- 1. "V12" Released: September 14, 2021; 2. "Let You" Released: November 12, 2021; 3. "Thought It Was" Released: January 18, 2022

On to Better Things is the second studio album by Puerto Rican-born American rapper and singer-songwriter Iann Dior. It was released on January 21, 2022, through 10K Projects. It features guest appearances from Lil Uzi Vert, Travis Barker of Blink-182, and Machine Gun Kelly. Production was handled by several record producers, including Brian Lee, Cashmere Cat, Cirkut, KBeaZy, Nick Mira, Omer Fedi, Taz Taylor and Travis Barker among others. The album peaked at number 28 on the US Billboard 200, selling 17,000 album-equivalent units in its first week.

== Critical reception ==
Professional ratings
Aggregate scores
Source	Rating
Metacritic	68/100
Review scores
Source	Rating
AllMusic	3.5/5 stars
Clash	6/10
NME	4/5 stars
Pitchfork	5.2/10
The Line of Best Fit	7/10

According to the review aggregator Metacritic, On to Better Things received "generally favorable reviews" based on a weighted average score of 68 out of 100 from five critic scores.

Kyann-Sian Williams of NME rated the album 4 out of 5 stars, saying that it "bottles up that teenage angst as perfectly as the golden age of pop-punk music". AllMusic's Fred Thomas found "several tracks ("Heavy", "Heartbreak3r", "Regret") follow a similar emo-rap style, but On to Better Things gets more interesting when Dior commits fully to exploring different approaches". Ims Taylor of The Line of Best Fit wrote: "Complicate It", "Heavy", "Heartbreak3r", all standalone fine, but ultimately all bring the same contribution to the shape of on to better things without providing much else. Where he digresses though, he does so excellently, promising that maybe with the challenge of a feature or with the fire to push his sound a bit more, he could be great». Chris Saunders of Clash wrote: "there are moments where Dior shows his undoubted potential and those moments save this album from being completely mediocre, unfortunately, those moments don't come anywhere near often enough". Dani Blum of Pitchfork stated that the artist "stays vague and vacant throughout the album, invested in his feelings but short on interesting ideas".

== Track listing ==
On to Better Things track listing
No.	Title	Writer(s)	Producer(s)	Length
1.	"Is It You"	Michael Olmo; Brian Lee	Lee; James Chul Rim	2:51
2.	"Complicate It"	Olmo; Danny Lee Snodgrass, Jr.; Henry Nichols; Nathan Scott Lamarche; Nicholas Mira	Nash; Mira; Pharaoh Vice; Taz Taylor	2:36
3.	"V12" (featuring Lil Uzi Vert)	Olmo; Symere Woods; Cody Rounds; Snodgrass; Mira; Ryan Cantu	Cxdy; Mira; Taylor	2:57
4.	"I Might"	Olmo; Billy Walsh; Keegan Christopher Bach; LunchMoney Lewis; Mark Williams; Raul Cubina	KBeaZy; Ojivolta	2:07
5.	"Heavy"	Olmo; Snodgrass; Mira	Mira; Taylor	2:09
6.	"Dark Angel Interlude"	Olmo; Bach; Andrew Luce	KBeaZy; Luce	1:29
7.	"Obvious" (with Travis Barker)	Olmo; Travis Barker; Kevin Gruft	Barker; Gruft	2:17
8.	"Heartbreak3r"	Olmo; Rounds; Snodgrass; Edgard Herrera; Michael Romito; Lamarche	Cxdy; Census; Herrera; Nash; Taylor	2:13
9.	"Options"	Olmo; Rounds; Snodgrass; Romito; Lamarche	Cxdy; Census; Nash; Taylor	1:42
10.	"Regret"	Olmo; Aaron Shadrow; Jasper Harris; Magnus August Høiberg; Mira	Shadrow; Cashmere Cat; Harris; Mira	3:01
11.	"Thought It Was" (with Machine Gun Kelly and Travis Barker)	Olmo; Colson Baker; Barker; Dan Wilson; Joe Pepe; Kyle Reynolds; Nick Cozine	Barker	2:52
12.	"Sinking Interlude"	Olmo; Luce; Lee; Kinderr	Luce; Lee; Kinderr	2:38
13.	"Let You"	Olmo; Luce; Henry Walter; Bach; Nick Long; Omer Fedi; Sean Foreman	Luce; Cirkut; KBeaZy; Long; Fedi	2:31
14.	"Fallin'"	Olmo; Jackson Morgan; Lee; Evan Gartner	Lee; Gartner	2:14
15.	"Hopeless Romantic" (featuring Travis Barker)	Olmo; Fedi; Barker	Fedi; Barker	2:48
Total length:				36:25

== Personnel ==
- Dale Becker – mastering (1, 2, 4–15)
- Mike Tucci – mastering (3)
- Hector Vega – mastering (6, 12)
- Serban Ghenea – mixing (1, 6, 10, 12, 13)
- Edgard Herrera – mixing (2, 3, 8), engineering (9)
- Teezio – mixing (4, 9, 14)
- Adam Hawkins – mixing (7, 11, 15)
- Benjamin Thomas – engineering (3)
- Young Era – engineering (3, 10)
- Ojivolta – engineering (4)
- Mark Schick – engineering (13)
- Ryan Cantu – engineering (14)

== Charts ==
Chart performance for On to Better Things
Chart (2022)	Peak position
Austrian Albums (Ö3 Austria)	33
Belgian Albums (Ultratop Flanders)	183
Canadian Albums (Billboard)	28
German Albums (Offizielle Top 100)	73
Dutch Albums (Album Top 100)	81
Norwegian Albums (VG-lista)	29
UK Albums (Official Charts)	92
US Billboard 200	28
US Top Alternative Albums (Billboard)	2
US Top Rap Albums (Billboard)	12
US Independent Albums (Billboard)	2
