= Make Up Sex (song) =

2022 song by Machine Gun Kelly

Single by Machine Gun Kelly featuring Blackbear

from the album Mainstream Sellout
- Released: April 26, 2022
- Genre: Pop rock
- Length: 2:02
- Label: Bad Boy; Interscope
- Songwriters: Colson Baker; Matthew Musto; Travis Barker; Omer Fedi; Nick Long
- Producers: Travis Barker; Omer Fedi; Colson Baker

Machine Gun Kelly singles chronology
"Maybe" (2022)	"Make Up Sex" (2022)	"GFY" (2022)

Blackbear singles chronology
"IDGAF" (2022)	"Make Up Sex" (2022)	"GFY" (2022)

Music video
- "Make Up Sex" on YouTube

"Make Up Sex" is a song by American musician Machine Gun Kelly featuring fellow American musician Blackbear. The song released on April 26, 2022 as the fifth single from Kelly's sixth studio album Mainstream Sellout (2022). The song was written by the artists, Nick Long, and producers Travis Barker and Omer Fedi.

== Reception ==
The Guardian said that the song has Mainstream Sellout's best, although lyrically uninspired, chorus. Wall of Sound called it his most mature song to date. i said to listen to the hilariously sexless song and try not to have a good time. Conversely, NME called it far away from the humanizing, tender moments on Tickets to My Downfall. Pitchfork called it hollower than "My Ex's Best Friend".

== Music video ==
A music video was released a few days following the release of Mainstream Sellout, with the song being one of its most standout songs amongst the track-list. The video features Baker standing in a room surrounded by cats dancing and playing his guitar throughout numerous transitions of settings, blackbear's verse features himself dancing surrounded by a large number of bright silver balloons.

== Charts ==
=== Weekly charts ===
Weekly chart performance for "Make Up Sex"
Chart (2022)	Peak position
Austria (Ö3 Austria Top 40)	68
Canada Hot 100 (Billboard)	33
Czech Republic Singles Digital (ČNS IFPI)	41
Global 200 (Billboard)	70
Ireland (IRMA)	74
San Marino (SMRRTV Top 50)	43
Slovakia (Singles Digitál Top 100)	41
UK Singles (Official Charts)	55
US Billboard Hot 100	59
US Hot Rock & Alternative Songs (Billboard)	5

=== Year-end charts ===
Year-end chart performance for "Make Up Sex"
Chart (2022)	Position
US Hot Rock & Alternative Songs (Billboard)	34

== Certifications ==
Certifications for "Make Up Sex"
Region	Certification	Certified units/sales
Canada (Music Canada)	Gold	40,000^{‡}
^{‡} Sales+streaming figures based on certification alone.

== Release history ==
Release history for "Make Up Sex"
Region	Date	Format	Label	Ref.
United States	April 26, 2022	Alternative radio	Interscope	
