= Maybe (Machine Gun Kelly song) =

Single by Machine Gun Kelly featuring Bring Me the Horizon

from the album Mainstream Sellout
- Released: March 16, 2022
- Recorded: 2022
- Genre: Pop punk; post-hardcore
- Length: 2:50
- Label: Bad Boy; Interscope
- Songwriters: Colson Baker; Travis Barker; Nick Long; Brandon Allen; Stephen Basil; Oliver Sykes; Jordan Fish; Omer Fedi
- Producers: Travis Barker; Colson Baker; Nick Long

Machine Gun Kelly singles chronology
"Ay!" (2022)	"Maybe" (2022)	"Make Up Sex" (2022)

Bring Me the Horizon singles chronology
"Bad Habits" (2022)	"Maybe" (2022)	"Fallout" (2022)

Music video
- "Maybe" on YouTube

"Maybe" is a song by American musician Machine Gun Kelly. It was released on March 16, 2022, as the fourth single from his sixth studio album Mainstream Sellout. The song features performances from members of the British rock band Bring Me the Horizon.

== Background ==
"Maybe" was first premiered on March 4, 2022, at the "Emo Nite" live event club night at Los Angeles' Avalon Hollywood venue. The song was released as the fourth single from Machine Gun Kelly's sixth studio album on March 16, Mainstream Sellout, after "Papercuts", "Emo Girl", and "Ay!". The song features members of the British rock band Bring Me the Horizon; the track is their second collaboration of 2022, following their remixed version of "Bad Habits" with Ed Sheeran.

An acoustic variation of the song was released on June 23, 2022, alongside the release of "Life in Pink Deluxe" version of the Mainstream Sellout album. As of June 6th, 2024 the official audio version is approaching 650k views and over 16k likes.

== Themes and composition ==
Rolling Stone described the song as "pop punk, albeit with some signature screaming from Sykes". The song features alternating vocals from Kelly and Sykes, with clean, melodic vocals throughout, and "deathcore-styled screaming" in the bridge by Sykes alone. The song opens up with a chant of "2,3,5!" by Kelly, as he felt the typical start of "1,2,3" was boring. BrooklynVegan, Louder Sound, Pitchfork and Wall of Sound compared the track to the sound of Paramore's song "Misery Business", a song that Kelly had covered in the past. The Daily Californian described it as a combination of Everlast's "What It's Like", and AFI's "Miss Murder" and the general sound of Blink-182. Clash compared the guitars to Linkin Park.

== Reception ==
Wall of Sound praised the song for being a "certainly decent track" and a "stand out on the album for alternative fans", whereas Kerrang! referred to it as a "massive banger". Clash also praised it, calling the song a "total delight". Other publications were less positive, critiquing it for its lack of originality. MetalSucks referred to it as "bland and predictable", while BrooklynVegan complained that it was too similar to Paramore's "Misery Business", to the point of declaring they felt Kelly probably owed the band royalty payments. Sputnikmusic said that Oli Sykes outshines Baker due to not being completely tone-deaf. Wall of Sound's album reviewer also felt differently about the track, concluding that "expectations fell short here."

== Music video ==
The official music video for "Maybe" was released on March 25, 2022, and was directed by Marc Klasfeld.

The video is set and recorded inside The Shard in London, England where Machine Gun Kelly performs the song alongside Bring Me the Horizon's Oli Sykes and Blink-182's drummer and album's producer Travis Barker, as the glass from The Shard shatters around them and forms into a massive cloud over the city as the song culminates and ends.

== Personnel ==
Credits adapted from Tidal.

Musicians

- Colson Baker – lead vocals, composer, lyricist, guitars
- Oliver Sykes – featured vocals, composer, lyricist
- Lee Malia – guitars
- Jordan Fish – keyboards, programming, percussion, backing vocals, composer, lyricist
- Matt Kean – bass
- Matt Nicholls – drums

Additional personnel

- Travis Barker – producer, composer, lyricist
- Omer Fedi – producer, composer, lyricist
- Adam Hawkins – mixing, studio personnel
- Chris Gehringer – mastering engineer, studio personnel
- Nick Long – producer, co-producer, composer, lyricist
- BazeXX – producer
- SlimXX – producer
- Stephen Basil – composer, lyricist
- Brandon Allen – composer, lyricist
- K Thrash – engineer, studio personnel
- Henry Lunetta – assistant mixer, studio personnel
- Hunter Smith – assistant mixer, studio personnel

== Charts ==
=== Weekly charts ===
Weekly chart performance for "Maybe"
Chart (2022)	Peak position
Australia (ARIA)	38
Austria (Ö3 Austria Top 40)	40
Canada Hot 100 (Billboard)	36
Czech Republic Singles Digital (ČNS IFPI)	30
Germany (GfK)	68
Global 200 (Billboard)	69
Ireland (IRMA)	68
New Zealand Hot Singles (RMNZ)	12
Slovakia (Singles Digitál Top 100)	30
South Africa Streaming (TOSAC)	88
Sweden Heatseeker (Sverigetopplistan)	5
UK Singles (Official Charts)	39
US Billboard Hot 100	68
US Hot Rock & Alternative Songs (Billboard)	6

=== Year-end charts ===
Year-end chart performance for "Maybe"
Chart (2022)	Position
US Hot Rock & Alternative Songs (Billboard)	43

== Certifications ==
Certifications for "Maybe"
Region	Certification	Certified units/sales
Canada (Music Canada)	Gold	40,000^{‡}
United Kingdom (BPI)	Silver	200,000^{‡}
^{‡} Sales+streaming figures based on certification alone.
