= GFY (song) =

2021 song by Blackbear

Single by Blackbear and Machine Gun Kelly

from the album In Loving Memory
- Released: May 27, 2022
- Genre: Pop punk
- Length: 2:52
- Label: Alamo; Columbia
- Songwriter(s): Matthew Musto; Colson Baker; Andrew Goldstein; Travis Barker; Omer Fedi; Sean Foreman
- Producer(s): Blackbear; Goldstein; Barker; Fedi

Blackbear singles chronology
"Make Up Sex" (2022)	"GFY" (2022)	"The Idea" (2022)

Machine Gun Kelly singles chronology
"Make Up Sex" (2022)	"GFY" (2022)	"More than Life" (2022)

Music video
- "GFY" on YouTube

"GFY" (abbreviation for "Go Fuck Yourself", stylized in all lowercase) is a song by American singers Blackbear and Machine Gun Kelly. It was released through Alamo and Columbia Records on May 27, 2022 as the lead single from the former's sixth studio album In Loving Memory.

== Background and composition ==
"GFY" was written and produced by Blackbear, Andrew Goldstein, Travis Barker, and Omer Fedi with additional writing from Machine Gun Kelly himself and Sean Foreman. The song sees the two singers recount a toxic relationship. Blackbear further described the background of working with Machine Gun Kelly in Apple Music's description of In Loving Memory:

[MGK] actually wrote his verse, and I was like, "I want the rapping Machine Gun Kelly. I want you to freaking give me the Eminem diss." He went in the studio and recorded it, and he sent it back. Then we rewrote it, and we recorded it again, and it was perfect. Every time I send him a verse, he makes me rewrite mine too. We’re always challenging each other.

— Blackbear

== Music video ==
The music video for "GFY" premiered on May 27, 2022 and was directed by Josh Tashiro, Tyler Serebreni, and Blackbear himself. The video features Machine Gun Kelly as the role of a wanted murder in hiding living across the street from Blackbear and his family. The video also features cameos from Mike Posner and Benny Blanco.

== Charts ==
Chart performance for "GFY"
Chart (2022)	Peak position
Canada (Canadian Hot 100)	85
New Zealand Hot Singles (RMNZ)	14
US Hot Rock & Alternative Songs (Billboard)	12
US Bubbling Under Hot 100 Singles (Billboard)	23
