= Mainstream Sellout =

- Original album cover (Note: On March 29, 2024, the standard edition's album artwork was changed digitally to the Target alternative cover.)

Studio album by Machine Gun Kelly
- Released: March 25, 2022
- Genre: Pop-punk
- Length: 40:18
- Labels: EST 19XX; Bad Boy; Interscope
- Producers: Travis Barker; Machine Gun Kelly; Nick Long; SlimXX; BazeXX; Omer Fedi; Ryan Tedder; KBeaZy; LJay Currie; Josh Strock; Morgoth Beatz

Machine Gun Kelly chronology
| Tickets to My Downfall (2020) | Mainstream Sellout (2022) | Genre: Sadboy (2024) |

Singles from Mainstream Sellout
- 1. "Papercuts" Released: August 11, 2021; 2. "Emo Girl" Released: February 4, 2022; 3. "Ay!" Released: March 4, 2022; 4. "Maybe" Released: March 16, 2022; 5. "Make Up Sex" Released: April 26, 2022; 6. "More than Life" Released: June 10, 2022

Mainstream Sellout is the sixth studio album by American musician and singer-songwriter Machine Gun Kelly, released on March 25, 2022, through Bad Boy Records and Interscope Records. It is his second collaborative project with drummer and producer Travis Barker, following 2020's Tickets to My Downfall. The album was initially announced in August 2021 under the title Born with Horns, before being renamed in January 2022.

A continuation of Kelly's transition into pop-punk, Mainstream Sellout was met with mixed reviews from critics. Kelly embarked on the Mainstream Sellout Tour throughout 2022 to promote the album. A deluxe edition with six new tracks, subtitled "Life in Pink Deluxe", was released on June 24, 2022. The album was nominated for Best Rock Album at the 65th Annual Grammy Awards.

== Background ==
The album was first announced on August 9, 2021, where Kelly and collaborator Travis Barker revealed matching tattoos of the phrase "born with horns", the album's previous title. Kelly announced that he and Barker were "back for round two", a reference to his fifth album Tickets to My Downfall, his first collaboration with Barker. Barker returned to produce Mainstream Sellout.

The album's lead single, "Papercuts", was released on August 11, 2021. The accompanying music video was directed by Cole Bennett. A 20-second teaser of a song was teased on Instagram prior to the album announcement: the post was captioned "Signed a deal; I got papercuts", which matched the lyrics in the clip. Previews teased that he had shaved his head for the music video, though it was later revealed to be a bald cap. The song has led journalists to believe he was continuing in the pop punk direction of Tickets to My Downfall. The song addresses Kelly's struggles with his own fame.

In October 2021, Kelly described the album as "darker" and more "guitar-heavy" than Tickets to My Downfall. He also hinted at a New Year's Day release date. On January 31, 2022, Kelly announced that the album had been retitled to Mainstream Sellout. On February 4, 2022, Kelly announced the release date of the album and released the second single "Emo Girl" featuring Willow. On March 4, 2022, Kelly released the third single, "Ay!" with Lil Wayne. On March 14, 2022, Kelly revealed the album cover and the tracklist using a series of Dolce & Gabbana designed clothing items that featured the song titles. The album cover attracted comparisons to that of Japanese Breakfast's 2021 album Jubilee, though Michelle Zauner denied the similarities, feeling the comparisons were manufactured to try to create controversy. On March 16, 2022, after having performed "Maybe" during Emo Nite in Los Angeles, Kelly released the track as the fourth single of the album. The song features the lead vocalist, Oliver Sykes, of British rock band Bring Me the Horizon. The album was released on March 25, 2022.

== Reception ==
Professional ratings
Aggregate scores
| Source | Rating |
|---|---|
| AnyDecentMusic? | 4.9/10 |
| Metacritic | 55/100 |
Review scores
| Source | Rating |
| AllMusic | 2.5/5 stars |
| Clash | 6/10 |
| The Guardian | 3/5 stars |
| The Independent | 2/5 stars |
| Kerrang! | 3/5 stars |
| NME | 4/5 stars |
| Pitchfork | 5.8/10 |
| Rolling Stone | 2.5/5 stars |
| Sputnikmusic | 1.0/5 |

At Metacritic, which assigns a normalized rating out of 100 to reviews from mainstream critics, the album has an average score of 55 out of 100, which indicates "mixed or average reviews" based on 10 reviews.

In a positive review, NME described the album as "no complacent victory lap" from Tickets to My Downfall, praising the album for having "a relatable sense of angst" that will "continue to speak to the millions who see Machine Gun Kelly as the saviour of punk rock", concluding that "though it inevitably lacks the shock of the new that made Downfall so exciting ... it seems that, like the pop-punk revival itself, Machine Gun Kelly won't run out of steam any time soon." AllMusic noted that while the music was filled with "big, distorted guitars, simplistic but catchy hooks, and Barker's tight, snappy drumming", they found it to be not as good as Tickets to My Downfall, with it being "lighter on ideas and cohesion".

Charles Aaron of Rolling Stone named the tracks "evolving, not-very-joyful noise" while opining "his buzzsaw-bubblegum can be entertaining. But he needs to realize that 'introspective' songwriting is about more than just yelling about how much you suck." Jesper L. of Sputnikmusic gave the album one out of five, ending his negative review stating that the album "proves that you don't need musical talent to make it big in the music scene". Helen Brown of The Independent called the album "dull", "formulaic", and "the kind of thing you'd expect to hear in the Vans outlet of your local shopping mall".

Neil McCormick of The Daily Telegraph opined that "the music hits you, not with a roar, but a very loud meh". Jake Richardson of Kerrang! stated the album "is the weakest record of MGK's rock era so far", although he specifically pointed out "5150" as "MGK's rock dalliance at its most effective".

Alim Kheraj of The Guardian named the record "entertaining but cliched". Emily Swingle of Clash opined that the album was "a brash but ultimately shallow return" and that "it's a shame that Kelly couldn't release a follow-up equally as fresh and fluid", but did name "Sid & Nancy" and "Twin Flame" as standout tracks. Arielle Gordon of Pitchfork wrote that "the enfant terrible of the pop-rock revival wades deeper into the genre, coming back with even less than before" and that it "too often feels like a concept album about rock."

== Commercial performance ==
Mainstream Sellout debuted atop the US all-format Billboard 200 albums chart dated April 9, 2022, moving 93,000 album equivalent units. The figure includes 42,000 pure album sales, also making it the highest-selling album of the week. It is Kelly's second US number-one album. In its following week the album dropped to number-nine, selling 30,500 units, figure includes 4,700 pure album sales. At the end of June 2022, Kelly released the "Life in Pink" deluxe version, as well had released the vinyl copy of the album. Mainstream Sellout jumped to number-seventeen and accumulated 25,900 album units, 9,000 being pure album sales. Mainstream Sellout entered at number-five on the Billboard Vinyl's chart. In the following week it dropped to twenty-eight on the Billboard 200 selling just over 17,000 album units, 2,600 of which were pure album sales.

After a close race in the United Kingdom, it debuted at number-two on the UK Albums Chart selling an estimated 210 units behind Michael Bublé eleventh studio album Higher, and marked his highest LP debut in the United Kingdom, eclipsing his previous best Tickets to My Downfall which debuted at number-three. Mainstream Sellout entered the UK's Official Vinyl Albums Chart debuting at number-nine, before falling off the chart in its following week. The album also re-entered the UK Albums Chart at number forty, before dropping to eighty-three.

In Canada, the album debuted atop the Canadian Albums Chart for the chart dated 9 April 2022, becoming Kelly's consecutive number-one album in the country. The album dropped to number-five in its following week.

In Australia, it debuted atop the ARIA Albums Chart, becoming Kelly's first number-one album in the country. Besting his previous 2020 album Tickets to My Downfall peak of number-two on the chart. In the albums following week it dropped seven chart positions to number-eight.

== Track listing ==
Mainstream Sellout track listing
| No. | Title | Writer(s) | Producer(s) | Length |
|---|---|---|---|---|
| 1. | "Born with Horns" | Colson Baker; Travis Barker; Nick Long | T. Barker; Long | 2:27 |
| 2. | "God Save Me" | Baker; T. Barker; Long; Brandon Allen; Stephen Basil | T. Barker; SlimXX; BazeXX | 3:00 |
| 3. | "Maybe" (with Bring Me the Horizon) | Baker; T. Barker; Long; Allen; Basil; Oliver Sykes; Jordan Fish; Omer Fedi | T. Barker; SlimXX; BazeXX; Fedi; Long | 2:50 |
| 4. | "Drug Dealer" (featuring Lil Wayne) | Baker; T. Barker; Allen; Basil; Fedi; Mike Posner; Dwayne Carter | T. Barker; SlimXX; BazeXX; Fedi; Machine Gun Kelly | 2:52 |
| 5. | "Wall of Fame (Interlude)" | Baker; Pete Davidson | | 0:32 |
| 6. | "Mainstream Sellout" | Baker; T. Barker; Long | T. Barker; Long | 1:47 |
| 7. | "Make Up Sex" (with Blackbear) | Baker; T. Barker; Long; Fedi; Matthew Musto | T. Barker; Fedi | 2:02 |
| 8. | "Emo Girl" (with Willow) | Baker; T. Barker; Long; Allen; Basil; Willow Smith | T. Barker; Long | 2:39 |
| 9. | "5150" | Baker; T. Barker; Long | T. Barker; Long | 2:54 |
| 10. | "Papercuts" (album edit) | Baker; T. Barker; Long | T. Barker; Long | 3:01 |
| 11. | "WW4" | Baker; T. Barker; Long | T. Barker; Long | 1:12 |
| 12. | "Ay!" (with Lil Wayne) | Baker; T. Barker; Allen; Basil; Gregory Hein | T. Barker; BazeXX; SlimXX | 2:04 |
| 13. | "Fake Love Don't Last" (with Iann Dior) | Baker; T. Barker; Long; Fedi; Ryan Tedder; Keegan Bach; Michael Ian Olmo | T. Barker; Fedi; Tedder; KBeaZy | 2:23 |
| 14. | "Die in California" (featuring Gunna, Young Thug and Landon Barker) | Baker; T. Barker; Sergio Kitchens; Jeffery Williams; Rachel West; Landon Barker; LJay Currie | T. Barker; Currie | 3:27 |
| 15. | "Sid & Nancy" | Baker; T. Barker; Josh Strock | T. Barker; Long; Fedi; Strock; Morgoth Beatz | 3:09 |
| 16. | "Twin Flame" | Baker; T. Barker; Long; Allen; Basil; Fedi | T. Barker; Long; Fedi; Machine Gun Kelly | 3:59 |
| Total length: | | | | 40:18 |

Target and HMV edition bonus tracks
| No. | Title | Writer(s) | Producer(s) | Length |
|---|---|---|---|---|
| 17. | "Love Race" (featuring Kellin Quinn) | Baker; T. Barker; Jared Gutstadt; Geoff Warburton; Jeff Peters; Matt Thiessen | Barker; Gutstadt; Peters | 3:08 |
| Total length: | | | | 43:16 |

Europe & Japan bonus tracks
| No. | Title | Writer(s) | Producer(s) | Length |
|---|---|---|---|---|
| 18. | "Why Are You Here" | Baker; Long; Allen; Basil; Goody Grace; JP Cappelletty | SlimXX; BazeXX; Machine Gun Kelly | 2:55 |
| Total length: | | | | 46:11 |

Life in Pink deluxe edition
| No. | Title | Writer(s) | Producer(s) | Length |
|---|---|---|---|---|
| 17. | "9 Lives" | Baker; Goldstein; Long; T. Barker | T. Barker; Andrew Goldstein; Long | 3:01 |
| 18. | "More than Life" (featuring Glaive) | Baker; Corey Sanders; glaive; Ichika Fukui; Steve Manovski; T. Barker | T. Barker; Ichika Fukui; Steve Manovski | 3:15 |
| 19. | "Why Are You Here" | Baker; Long; Allen; Grace; JP Cappatelly; Basil | Baker; SlimXX; BazeXX | 2:55 |
| 20. | "Last November" | Baker; Hein; Long; T. Barker | T. Barker; Long | 2:54 |
| 21. | "Papercuts" (live from Red Rocks) | Baker; Long; T. Barker | T. Barker; Long | 4:04 |
| 22. | "Maybe" (acoustic version) (with Bring Me the Horizon) | Baker; Allen; Long; Sykes; Fedi; Basil; T. Barker | T. Barker | 2:54 |
| Total length: | | | | 59:33 |

Notes

- All tracks except for "WW4" are stylized in all lowercase.
- "Wall of Fame (Interlude)" contains uncredited vocals from Pete Davidson.

== Personnel ==
- Machine Gun Kelly – vocals (all), guitars (1, 4, 6, 7, 9, 13, 15), co-production (all)
- Travis Barker – drums (1, 2, 4, 6–16), production (all)
- Nick Long – guitars (all), production (1, 3, 6, 8–12, 15, 16)
- Omer Fedi – guitars (13, 15, 16), production (4, 7, 13, 15, 16)
- Steve Basil – bass (1, 2, 4, 6–16), keyboards (8, 12, 16)

Guest musicians

- Lil Wayne – vocals (4, 12)
- Pete Davidson – appearance (5)
- Oliver Sykes – vocals (3)
- Mat Nicholls – drums (3)
- Jordan Fish – keyboards (3)
- Lee Malia – guitars (3)
- Matt Kean – bass (3)
- Blackbear – vocals (7)
- Willow – vocals (8)
- Iann Dior – vocals (13)
- Gunna – vocals (14)
- Young Thug – vocals (14)
- Landon Barker – vocals (14)

== Charts ==
=== Weekly charts ===
Weekly chart performance for Mainstream Sellout
| Chart (2022) | Peak position |
|---|---|
| Australian Albums (ARIA) | 1 |
| Austrian Albums (Ö3 Austria) | 3 |
| Belgian Albums (Ultratop Flanders) | 6 |
| Belgian Albums (Ultratop Wallonia) | 40 |
| Canadian Albums (Billboard) | 1 |
| Czech Albums (ČNS IFPI) | 2 |
| Danish Albums (Hitlisten) | 17 |
| Dutch Albums (Album Top 100) | 6 |
| Finnish Albums (Suomen virallinen lista) | 10 |
| French Albums (SNEP) | 81 |
| German Albums (Offizielle Top 100) | 3 |
| Irish Albums (Official Charts) | 4 |
| Italian Albums (FIMI) | 10 |
| Lithuanian Albums (AGATA) | 29 |
| New Zealand Albums (RMNZ) | 4 |
| Norwegian Albums (VG-lista) | 5 |
| Polish Albums (ZPAV) | 36 |
| Scottish Albums (Official Charts) | 2 |
| Slovak Albums (ČNS IFPI) | 3 |
| Spanish Albums (PROMUSICAE) | 15 |
| Swedish Albums (Sverigetopplistan) | 28 |
| Swiss Albums (Schweizer Hitparade) | 7 |
| UK Albums (Official Charts) | 2 |
| US Billboard 200 | 1 |
| US Top Alternative Albums (Billboard) | 1 |
| US Top Rock Albums (Billboard) | 1 |

=== Year-end charts ===
Year-end chart performance for Mainstream Sellout
| Chart (2022) | Position |
|---|---|
| Australian Albums (ARIA) | 95 |
| Austrian Albums (Ö3 Austria) | 65 |
| Belgian Albums (Ultratop Flanders) | 173 |
| UK Cassette Albums (OCC) | 10 |
| US Billboard 200 | 121 |
| US Top Rock Albums (Billboard) | 18 |

== Certifications ==
Certifications for Mainstream Sellout
| Region | Certification | Certified units/sales |
|---|---|---|
| Canada (Music Canada) | Platinum | 80,000^{‡} |
| Hungary (MAHASZ) | Platinum | 4,000^{‡} |
| United Kingdom (BPI) | Gold | 100,000^{‡} |
| United States (RIAA) | Gold | 500,000^{‡} |
^{‡} Sales+streaming figures based on certification alone.
