= Love Race =

2021 single by Machine Gun Kelly featuring Kellin Quinn

Single by Machine Gun Kelly featuring Kellin Quinn

from the album Tickets to My Downfall (All Access)
- Released: April 29, 2021
- Recorded: 2021
- Genre: Pop-punk
- Length: 3:08
- Label: Bad Boy; Interscope
- Songwriters: Colson Baker; Travis Barker; Jared Gutstadt; Geoff Warburton; Jeff Peters; Matt Thiessen
- Producers: Travis Barker; Jared Gutstadt; Jeff Peters

Machine Gun Kelly singles chronology
"DayWalker" (2021)	"Love Race" (2021)	"Papercuts" (2021)

Kellin Quinn singles chronology
"Wrong" (2021)	"Love Race" (2021)

Music video
- "Love Race" on YouTube

"Love Race" is a song by American musician Machine Gun Kelly featuring fellow American musician Kellin Quinn of the band Sleeping with Sirens, released through Bad Boy and Interscope on April 29, 2021. In collaboration with frequent collaborator Travis Barker, "Love Race" was later included on the European and Japanese editions of Kelly's sixth studio album Mainstream Sellout (2022).

== Background and recording ==
The song was released on April 29, 2021. The song features drumming by Travis Barker, who had previously drummed on Kelly's 2020 pop punk album Tickets to My Downfall. Barker also provided production on the track, while Jared Gutstadt and Jeff Peters of Audio Chateau helped write the song. The song also received an unexplained writing credit to Matthew Thiessen of the rock band Relient K. The song features vocals from Kellin Quinn of the rock band Sleeping with Sirens. The song was the third collaboration between Kelly and Quinn, the prior being a remix of Rise Against's single "Swing Life Away". Kelly noted that he improvised his lyrics for the song and had his parts done in five minutes.

== Themes and composition ==
Publications generally described the song as pop punk and similar in nature to the material found in Kelly's Tickets to My Downfall (2020) album. Guitar World described the song as having a "syncopated, reverb-heavy guitar line" in the song's verses that eventually builds into chorus of powerchord guitars and vocal hooks. The song features alternating lower pitched hoarse vocals by Kelly, and higher pitched vocals by Quinn, with the song's second half containing segments of them singing concurrently.

== Reception ==
Both Billboard and Guitar World publications highlighted the song as a standout single release in its release week. Exclaim! noted that Baker's voice was less grating next to Quinn's voice, but noted that "the whole thing goes down surprisingly smooth".

== Personnel ==
Credits adapted from Tidal.

- Machine Gun Kelly – vocals, guitar, lyrics, composition
- Travis Barker – drums, production, lyrics
- Kellin Quinn – vocals
- Jared Gutstadt – production, composition, lyrics
- Geoff Warburton – composition, lyrics
- Jeff Peters – composition, lyrics
- Matt Thiessen – composition, lyrics
- K Thrash – engineering
- Manny Marroquin – engineering, mixing
- Chris Gehringer – mastering

== Charts ==
=== Weekly charts ===
Weekly chart performance for "Love Race"
Chart (2021)	Peak position
Australia (ARIA)	87
Belgium (Ultratip Bubbling Under Flanders)	38
Canada (Canadian Hot 100)	75
Canada Rock (Billboard)	41
Czech Republic (Singles Digitál Top 100)	60
Global 200 (Billboard)	115
Ireland (IRMA)	64
New Zealand Hot Singles (RMNZ)	10
UK Singles (OCC)	56
US Bubbling Under Hot 100 (Billboard)	2
US Alternative Airplay (Billboard)	13
US Hot Rock & Alternative Songs (Billboard)	12
US Rock & Alternative Airplay (Billboard)	24

=== Year-end charts ===
Year-end chart performance for "Love Race"
Chart (2021)	Position
US Hot Rock & Alternative Songs (Billboard)	50
