= More than Life (Machine Gun Kelly song) =

Single by Machine Gun Kelly featuring Glaive

from the album Mainstream Sellout (Life in Pink deluxe)
- Released: June 10, 2022
- Genre: Pop-punk
- Length: 3:16
- Label: Bad Boy; Interscope
- Songwriters: Colson Baker; Travis Barker; Ichika Fukui; Ash Gutierrez; Steve Manovski; Corey Sanders
- Producer: Travis Barker

Machine Gun Kelly singles chronology
"GFY" (2022)	"More than Life" (2022)	"Pressure" (2023)

Glaive singles chronology
"Mental" (2022)	"More than Life" (2022)	"Minnesota Is a Place That Exists" (2022)

Music video
- "More than Life" on YouTube

"More than Life" is a song by American musician Machine Gun Kelly featuring fellow American musician Glaive. It was released by Bad Boy and Interscope Records on June 10, 2022, as the only single (sixth overall) from the Life in Pink deluxe edition of the former's sixth studio album, Mainstream Sellout. It was written by the artists alongside Corey Sanders, Ichika Fukui, Steve Manovski, and producer Travis Barker. It is a pop-punk track characterized by its angsty vocals and histrionics, as well as a guitar motif and eighth note power chords. A music video directed by Colin Tilley premiered on the same day as the song's release. During July 2022, a live performance music video was released via Vevo, and the pair performed the song at Lollapalooza. Machine Gun Kelly included the song in the setlist of his Mainstream Sellout Tour throughout 2022. It charted on Billboard's Hot Rock & Alternative Songs and Bubbling Under Hot 100 charts, and on Recorded Music NZ's New Zealand Hot Singles chart.

== Background and release ==
Machine Gun Kelly released his sixth studio album, Mainstream Sellout, in March 2022, to mixed critical reviews. However, it was commercially successful, debuting at number one on the Billboard 200, becoming his second number one album. Its vinyl deluxe edition, subtitled Life in Pink, was released on June 24, 2022, and "More than Life" served as a bonus track single from the deluxe. It was announced on Machine Gun Kelly's Instagram account on June 8, 2022, alongside its cover art and behind-the-scenes photographs of its music video, and was released by Bad Boy and Interscope Records on June 10. Glaive first garnered attention after posting a string of hyperpop songs during the COVID-19 pandemic. Earlier in 2022, he released Old Dog, New Tricks, the deluxe edition of his 2021 extended play (EP), All Dogs Go to Heaven. A press release of the song said that it "exhibits MGK's gift for relaying passionate pain as he weighs his fears of vulnerability with the acceptance of newfound love".

After Glaive recorded his verse of the song, the people working on it were impressed. This led to Machine Gun Kelly re-recording the song and changing his verse. In an interview with NME, Glaive expressed that it was an interesting story to tell: "It was so good that he had to change his verse!". During the same interview, he also commented on Machine Gun Kelly: "For the amount of people that really dislike this guy, he might be the nicest person I've ever met. Every time I've talked to him he's been kind-hearted, and said to call him if I need anything".

== Composition ==
"More than Life" is 3 minutes and 16 seconds long. Both Machine Gun Kelly and Glaive wrote the song alongside Corey Sanders, Ichika Fukui, Steve Manovski, and Travis Barker; the latter also produced the track. It was mixed by Rob Kinelski and was mastered by Will Quinnell. Fukui and Manovski provided additional production, while Eli Heisler assisted the mixing process. It is a pop-punk track with angsty vocals and histrionics. It begins with Fukui's clean guitar motif, which then expands into eighth note power chords, as well as Machine Gun Kelly and Glaive's vocals. For Rolling Stone, Kat Bouza likened the song's melodramatic lyrics to 19th century romance novels and 2000s LiveJournal posts. Louder's Paul Brannigan described the track as "rather moody and angst-ridden". He also wrote, "Lest anyone imagine that pop-punk's Megan Fox-dating, award-winning, record-breaking clown prince is having the time of his life, a cursory glance at the lyrics suggests otherwise".

== Music video and live performances ==
Colin Tilley directed the stylized music video for "More than Life", which premiered alongside the song's release. It depicts Machine Gun Kelly getting covered in cement as he hangs out with Glaive in an old house filled with overgrown plants. In July 2022, a live performance of the song was released via Vevo, which gained over a million views within a few hours of its release. In the same month, they also performed the song at Lollapalooza in Chicago, and Machine Gun Kelly included it in the setlist of his Mainstream Sellout Tour throughout 2022.

== Commercial performance ==
"More than Life" peaked at number 12 on Billboard's Hot Rock & Alternative Songs chart, lasting eight weeks on the chart. It charted for one week Recorded Music NZ's New Zealand Hot Singles chart, peaking at number 17. On Billboard's Bubbling Under Hot 100 chart, it charted for one week, peaking at number 24.

== Charts ==
Chart performance for "More than Life"
Chart (2022)	Peak position
New Zealand Hot Singles (RMNZ)	17
US Bubbling Under Hot 100 (Billboard)	24
US Hot Rock & Alternative Songs (Billboard)	12
