= Honestav =

American musician

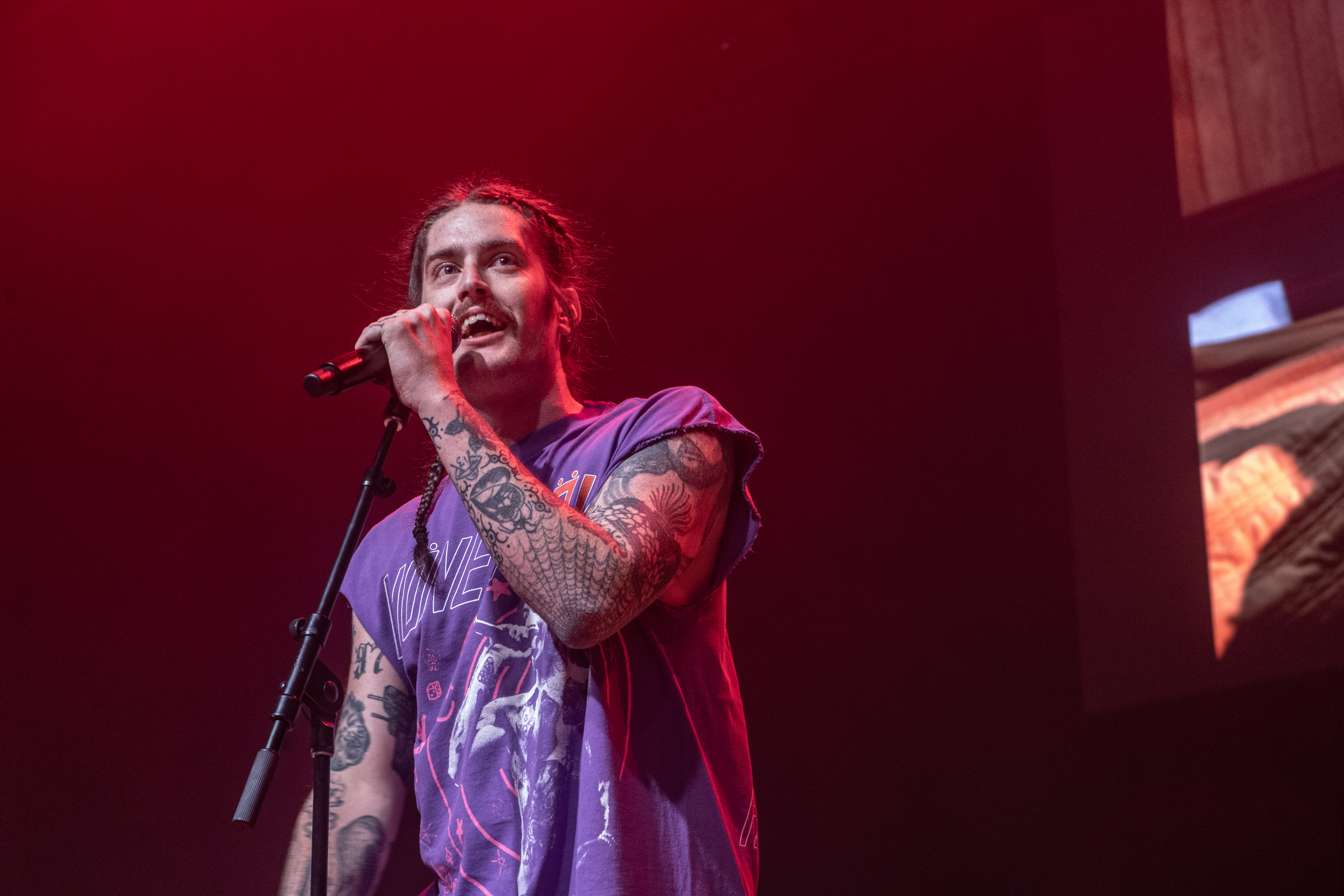
- Honestav performing at The Shrine Mosque in Springfield Missouri - 12-31-25
- Born: Avrey Freeman; April 17th, 1998 (age 28); Pierce City, Missouri, United States
- Occupations: Singer; songwriter
- Years active: 2009–present
- Musical career
- Origin: Kansas City, Missouri, U.S.
- Genres: Alternative rock; indie rock; hip-hop
- Label: Rebel Music/gamma

Avrey Freeman, known professionally as Honestav (stylized in all lowercase) is an American musician from Pierce City, Missouri, best known for his 2024, "I'd Rather Overdose".

== Early life and education ==
Avrey Freeman was born on April 17, 1998, And was raised in rural Pierce City, Missouri, the youngest of eight siblings. Freeman said of his siblings, "They all wanted to be rockstars." "I was a little kid going and watching my sixteen-year-old brother play screamo shows in bowling alleys and pizza joints, I was hooked, I wanted it bad." Freeman's parents struggled with drug abuse, and he described his childhood household as "violent." He spent half the month with his mother, and half the month with his father. His mother was arrested multiple times for selling methamphetamine. Freeman has said his dad was "more stable" than his mom, but that he did not have air conditioning and experienced food insecurity. When he was fifteen years old, he found his brother's body after he died by suicide.

The start of his music started out at writing poems at the age of 8 years old, by the time he was 12 years old, Freeman had written his first song. He didn't start uploading / Posting his music until the age of 17 on the music platform, Soundcloud. At the age of 23 in 2021, he started to post his music on all streaming platforms.

Freeman's biggest influences within the music industry (Artist Wise) are Musicians Kurt Cobain, XXXTentacion, Green Day, Blink-182, Mac Miller, Sleepy Hallow, And Noah Kahan.

== Career ==
After graduating high school, Freeman began selling marijuana and later worked for a moving company for four years. Freeman began posting videos to TikTok, earning enough money that he could quit his job and spend time in the studio. In January 2024, Freeman's father died by suicide. Following the event, Freeman wrote "I'd Rather Overdose" and uploaded it to TikTok. The song became a huge success, appearing on Billboard music charts.

On November 8, 2024, Freeman released his first extended play, hara-kiri, which included "I'd Rather Overdose". Freeman later signed with Rebel Music/gamma. He opened for Mod Sun and Lovelytheband on the 2024 Here's Your Flowers Tour.

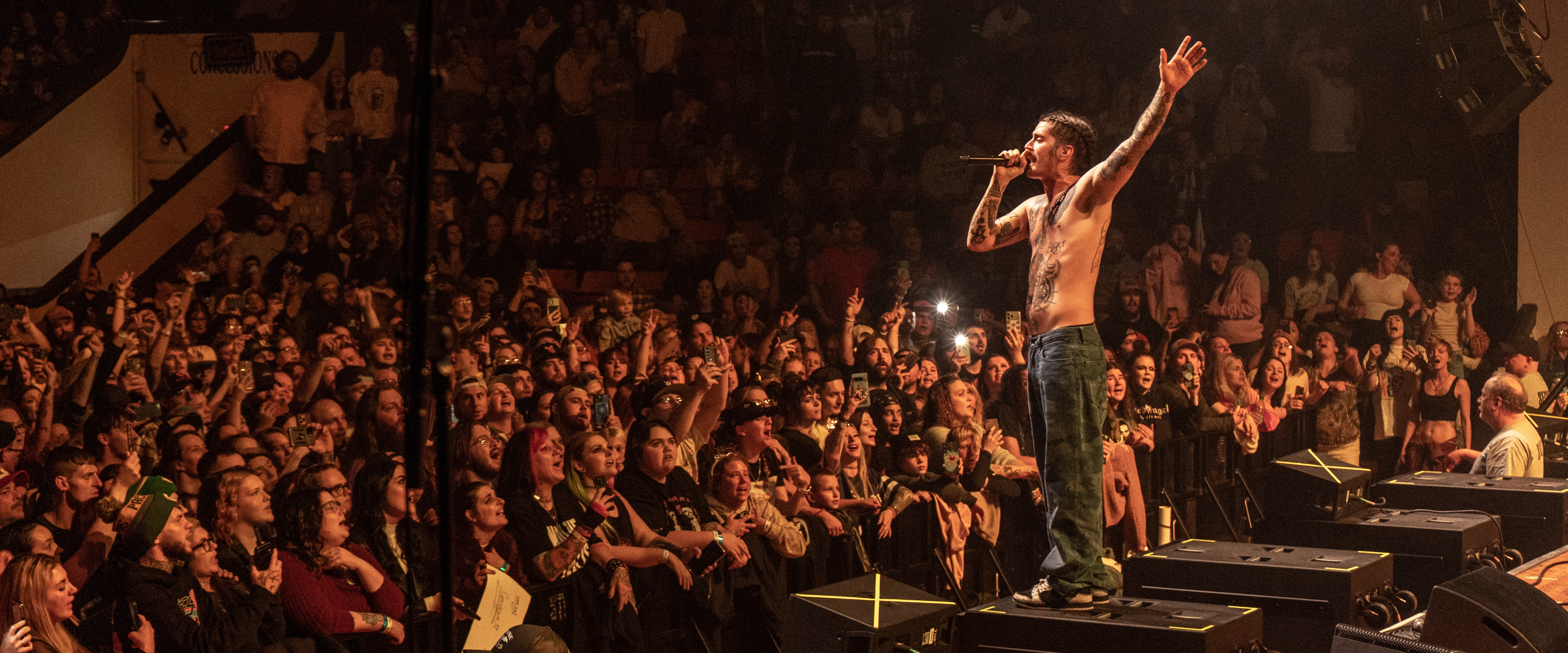
Honestav performing at The Shrine Mosque in Springfield Missouri - 12-31-25

On May 16, 2025, Freeman released his first album, hara-kiri (Deluxe).

In October 2025, Freeman performed at the Austin City Limits Music Festival. On November 7, 2025, Freeman released the song "Wasted", as the lead single from his upcoming 2026 EP. "Wasted" was produced by Take a Daytrip.

Freeman opened for MGK on the Australia and New Zealand leg of the Lost Americana Tour.
