= Don't Let Me Go (Machine Gun Kelly song) =

2024 single by Machine Gun Kelly

Single by Machine Gun Kelly
- Released: February 21, 2024
- Length: 2:53
- Label: EST 19XX; Bad Boy; Interscope
- Songwriters: Colson Baker; Steve Basil; Brandon Allen
- Producers: BazeXX; SlimXX

Machine Gun Kelly singles chronology
"Pressure" (2023)	"Don't Let Me Go" (2024)	"BMXXing" (2024)

Music video
- "Don't Let Me Go" on YouTube

"Don't Let Me Go" is a song by American musician Machine Gun Kelly, released on February 21, 2024. It was produced by BazeXX and SlimXX.

== Composition ==
The song finds Machine Gun Kelly melodically rapping over a piano-laced instrumental about his personal issues, including his "breakdown" that led him to receive his recently debuted "blackout" tattoo (which covers most of his arms and torso), struggles with mental health emotional instability, substance abuse and suicidal thoughts, childhood trauma of having a shattered relationship with his father and being abandoned by both of his parents at a young age (although later reconciling with his mother), and development of trust issues as a consequence. In the second and final verse, he mentions his fiancée Megan Fox suffering from a miscarriage. MGK then discusses feeling alone due to the deaths in his family. At the end of the verse, he confesses his fear of being abandoned by fans and dying without leaving an influence on the world. The chorus suggests he is on the road to recovery.

== Music video ==
The music video was released alongside the single. It sees Machine Gun Kelly playing the piano and performing the song in various places, such as under a bridge, in front of the skyline of downtown Cleveland (his hometown), in the dark woods and the rain.

== Charts ==
Chart performance for "Don't Let Me Go"
Chart (2024)	Peak position
Canada (Canadian Hot 100)	75
New Zealand Hot Singles (RMNZ)	15
UK Singles (OCC)	91
US Billboard Hot 100	76
