= Fix Ur Face =

Single by MGK featuring Fred Durst
- Released: April 21, 2026
- Genre: Nu metal
- Length: 3:19
- Label: Interscope
- Composers: Colson Baker; Nick Long; Andrew Migliore; Brandon Allen; Steve Basil
- Producers: SlimXX; BazeXX; No Love for the Middle Child; Nick Long

MGK singles chronology
"Times of My Life" (2026)	"Fix Ur Face" (2026)	"Girl Next Door" (2026)

Music video
- "Fix Ur Face" on YouTube

"Fix Ur Face" (stylized in all caps) is a song by American musician MGK featuring fellow American musician and frontman of Limp Bizkit, Fred Durst. MGK confirmed this is the first single for his upcoming rap album.

The song was written by Baker himself alongside longtime collaborators Andrew "No Love for the Middle Child" Migliore, Brandon "SlimXX" Allen, Nick Long and Steve "BazeXX" Basil. Its release was accompanied by a music video directed by Sam Cahill, filmed in London, Prague, Dublin, Cologne, Berlin and various US cities.

== Background and release ==
The song was originally teased during the European leg of the Lost Americana Tour, being played before the shows started. It was then debuted live on April 8, 2026, at the RAC Arena in Perth, Australia. The song was then announced on April 17, 2026.

== Composition and lyrics ==
Various outlets described the song as "nu metal with elements of hip-hop" and added the song was a return to MGK's rap roots with Durst acting as a "hype-man".

Lyrics in the song were quickly pointed out to be a potential diss to Yungblud (Dominic Harrison) and Kelly and Sharon Osbourne.

Mickey Mouse kids turned rockstars
Leavin' private school, tryna to be outlaws

The line above quickly drew attention to Harrison's appearance on Disney Channel show, The Lodge, and his private schooling background.

And all the old heads tryna kill the vibe
But rock's not dead as long as I'm alive

This line too gained attention. On a podcast in 2024, Sharon and Kelly Osbourne accused MGK of copying Harrison's pink aesthetic. Harrison did not defend the comment, responding with "that's fair".

== Personnel ==
Credits are adapted from iTunes.

Musicians

- MGK – vocals
- Fred Durst – vocals
- SlimXX – keyboards
- BazeXX – keyboards, bass
- No Love for the Middle Child – guitars, background vocals, keyboards, Drum programming
- Nick Long – guitars
- RookXX – drums

Technical

- Shaan Singh – engineer
- Nathan Phillips – mixing engineer
- Dale Becker – mastering engineer
- Katie Harvey – mastering engineer
- Adam Burt – mastering engineer

== Charts ==
Chart performance for "Fix Ur Face"
Chart (2026)	Peak position
Canada Mainstream Rock (Billboard Canada)	30
Italy Rock Airplay (FIMI)	4
New Zealand Hot Singles (RMNZ)	24
UK Singles Downloads (OCC)	64
UK Rock & Metal (OCC)	28
US Hot Rock & Alternative Songs (Billboard)	48
