= Emo Girl =

Single by Machine Gun Kelly, featuring Willow

from the album Mainstream Sellout
- Released: February 4, 2022
- Genre: Pop-punk
- Length: 2:39
- Label: Bad Boy; Interscope
- Songwriters: Machine Gun Kelly, Travis Barker, Willow Smith, Brandon Allen, Nick Long, Stephen Basil
- Producer: Travis Barker

Machine Gun Kelly singles chronology
"Thought It Was" (2022)	"Emo Girl" (2022)	"Ay!" (2022)

Willow singles chronology
"Gaslight" (2021)	"Emo Girl" (2022)	"Purge" (2022)

Music video
- "Emo Girl" on YouTube

"Emo Girl" (stylized in all lowercase) is a song by Machine Gun Kelly, featuring Willow. Produced by Travis Barker, the song was released on February 4, 2022, as the second single off of Kelly's sixth studio album Mainstream Sellout, following "Papercuts".

== Background ==
In 2021, Machine Gun Kelly had reported that he had worked on a collaboration with Willow Smith; at the time, the song had the working title of "Emo Prom". The song was first previewed on the January 30, 2022, on Kelly's TikTok account, by the title "Cherry Red Lipstick". By February 4, the clip had amassed 24 million views. The final version of the song, now titled "Emo Girl", was released on February 4, just after Kelly had announced the song's respective album had been retitled from Born with Horns to Mainstream Sellout. The song features drumming, production, and a co-writing credit from Blink-182 drummer Travis Barker, who had previously collaborated with Kelly on his 2020 album Tickets to My Downfall. Barker had also previously collaborated on Willow's 2021 album Lately I Feel Everything.

== Composition and themes ==
The song's sound was described as pop punk by multiple publications, being compared to the work of Blink-182, New Found Glory, and Bowling for Soup. As such, many also noted that it sounded like it could have been released in 2000's rock music scene. The track opens with a soundbite of Kelly's fiancé Megan Fox stating that she is a god, followed immediately by a "pop punk guitar riff". The soundbite comes from the 2009 film Jennifer's Body. The song then moves into lyrics that were described by Loudwire as a "laundry list of emo tropes" and as a mix between Blink 182's "The Rock Show" and Type O Negative's "Black No. 1". The song even references Blink-182 lyrically, with Willow singing about "bleeding on your Blink tee". Rolling Stone described the song musically as a mix between Avril Lavigne's "Sk8er Boi" and Good Charlotte's "Riot Girl".

== Reception ==
Billboard praised the song as being a good example of how Machine Gun Kelly and Willow had successfully rebranded themselves as part of the 2020s pop punk revival, stating that the song "functions as a summit of artists hoisting up their rock cred in joyful unison". NME called it a stand out song on Mainstream Sellout, praising Baker and Smith's chemistry, saying they bounce off each other. Clash said it has bucketloads of charm. Rolling Stone called it a "gleefully derivative" song that shows that "when Kelly reins in his yelp tiks, the buzzsaw bubblegum sticks". Other publications were more critical about the song's lack of originality. Loudwire found the lyrics to "pander[ing] to scenesters", while The Daily Californian complained of its "vapid lyricism and repetitive chorus." Wall of Sound felt that despite its "highly infectious melody", the song was ultimately annoying. BrooklynVegan called it "a thoughtless, generic song that even a C-list pop punk band would've left on the cutting room floor in the mid 2000s." Pitchfork felt that it is too "serious to laugh at itself and too absurd to take seriously." Sputnikmusic called Smith the best part of the song, stating that unlike Baker she can actually sing.

== Personnel ==
- Machine Gun Kelly – vocals, songwriting
- Travis Barker – drums, production, songwriting
- Willow Smith – vocals, songwriting
- Brandon Allen – production, songwriting
- Nick Long – bass, songwriting
- Stephen Basil – guitars, songwriting

== Charts ==
=== Weekly charts ===
Weekly chart performance for "Emo Girl"
Chart (2022)	Peak position
Australia (ARIA)	78
Belgium (Ultratop 50 Flanders)	49
Canada Hot 100 (Billboard)	64
Canada Rock (Billboard)	38
Czech Republic Airplay (ČNS IFPI)	29
Czech Republic Singles Digital (ČNS IFPI)	56
Global 200 (Billboard)	91
Ireland (IRMA)	71
Netherlands (Dutch Top 40)	38
New Zealand Hot Singles (RMNZ)	11
Slovakia (Singles Digitál Top 100)	56
Sweden Heatseeker (Sverigetopplistan)	15
UK Singles (OCC)	52
US Billboard Hot 100	77
US Alternative Airplay (Billboard)	21
US Hot Rock & Alternative Songs (Billboard)	9
US Rock & Alternative Airplay (Billboard)	45

=== Year-end charts ===
Year-end chart performance for "Emo Girl"
Chart (2022)	Position
US Hot Rock & Alternative Songs (Billboard)	33

== Certifications ==
Certifications for "Emo Girl"
Region	Certification	Certified units/sales
Canada (Music Canada)	Gold	40,000^{‡}
United States (RIAA)	Gold	500,000^{‡}
^{‡} Sales+streaming figures based on certification alone.

== Release history ==
Release history for "Emo Girl"
Region	Date	Format	Label	Ref.
Various	February 4, 2022	Digital download; streaming	Bad Boy; Interscope	
Italy	February 4, 2022	Contemporary hit radio	Universal	
United States	February 15, 2022	Alternative radio	Interscope	
