= Ay! =

2022 single by Machine Gun Kelly and Lil Wayne

Single by Machine Gun Kelly and Lil Wayne

from the album Mainstream Sellout
- Released: March 4, 2022
- Genre: Emo rap; trap
- Length: 2:04
- Label: Bad Boy; Interscope
- Songwriters: Colson Baker; Travis Barker; Stephen Basil; Brandon Allen; Gregory Hein; Nick Long
- Producers: Travis Barker; BazeXX; SlimXX

Machine Gun Kelly singles chronology
"Emo Girl" (2022)	"Ay!" (2022)	"Maybe" (2022)

Lil Wayne singles chronology
"Thought I Was Gonna Stop (Remix)" (2022)	"Ay!" (2022)	"Poison" (2022)

Music video
- "Ay!" on YouTube

"Ay!" is a song by American rappers Machine Gun Kelly and Lil Wayne. It was released on March 4, 2022 as the third single from the former's sixth studio album Mainstream Sellout (2022). The song was produced by Travis Barker, BazeXX, and SlimXX.

== Background ==
In February 2022, Machine Gun Kelly performed a snippet of the song at The Late Late Show with James Corden, in a medley of "Ay!", then-unreleased track "Maybe" and "Emo Girl". The song has been considered to a return to the hip hop genre for Machine Gun Kelly, although it comes from an album that is still largely to the pop punk genre.

== Composition ==
"Ay!" is an emo rap song that blends elements of pop punk and trap, featuring "brooding but dreamy guitar loop with crisp hip-hop production". Machine Gun Kelly sings about sadness affecting his life, including "his preference for sad playlists, skipping meetings, and sleeping until 7 p.m."; he mentions cutting his hair and compares it to Britney Spears shaving her hair off in 2007 during her breakdown. Lil Wayne's verse has a reference to Guns N' Roses.

== Reception ==
AllMusic said "the watery emo-trap track "Ay!" doesn't commit fully enough to any of its stylistic directions, giving Lil Wayne little to work with as he turns in a distracted, Auto-Tune-doused verse." In a review of Mainstream Sellout, BrooklynVegan called the song, along with "Drug Dealer", "among its most forgettable" tracks.

== Music video ==
The music video was released alongside the single. It was filmed in Machine Gun Kelly's home from an iPhone, on the night before it was released. It finds Kelly and four friends in a dressing room changing into different flashy outfits. Lil Wayne does not physically appear, but a paper cutout of a drawn Wayne performs in the video.

== Charts ==
=== Weekly charts ===
Weekly chart performance for "Ay!"
Chart (2022)	Peak position
Canada Hot 100 (Billboard)	57
Global 200 (Billboard)	92
Czech Republic Singles Digital (ČNS IFPI)	86
Ireland (IRMA)	92
New Zealand Hot Singles (RMNZ)	7
Slovakia (Singles Digitál Top 100)	88
South Africa Streaming (TOSAC)	93
UK Singles (OCC)	80
US Billboard Hot 100	82
US Hot Rock & Alternative Songs (Billboard)	8

=== Year-end charts ===
Year-end chart performance for "Ay!"
Chart (2022)	Position
US Hot Rock & Alternative Songs (Billboard)	40

== Certifications ==
Certifications for "Ay!"
Region	Certification	Certified units/sales
Canada (Music Canada)	Gold	40,000^{‡}
^{‡} Sales+streaming figures based on certification alone.
