= Papercuts (Machine Gun Kelly song) =

Single by Machine Gun Kelly

from the album Mainstream Sellout
- Released: August 11, 2021
- Recorded: 2021
- Genre: Rock; punk rock; alternative rock; grunge-pop; pop-punk; grunge
- Length: 3:01
- Label: Bad Boy; Interscope
- Songwriters: Colson Baker; Travis Barker; Nick Long
- Producers: Travis Barker; Nick Long

Machine Gun Kelly singles chronology
"Love Race" (2021)	"Papercuts" (2021)	"Thought It Was" (2022)

"Papercuts" (stylized in all lowercase) is a song by American musician Machine Gun Kelly, released on August 11, 2021, as the first single from his sixth studio album Mainstream Sellout (2022). The song features drumming and production from collaborator Travis Barker.

== Background ==
"Papercuts" is the lead single for Machine Gun Kelly's sixth studio album Mainstream Sellout, originally planned to be named Born With Horns at the time of the single's release. Much like Kelly's prior album, Tickets to My Downfall, the song features Travis Barker on drums and as a music producer. The song was first released on August 11, 2021, though Kelly had released a small teaser of the track in the week prior to the song and album's reveal.

A music video, directed by Cole Bennett, was released concurrently with the full track. The video was the first Bennett has ever directed for a rock music video, and was the culmination of himself and Kelly planning on working together over the course of a three-year period. Both Kelly and Bennett were very happy with the process and end product, despite that fact the shooting had initially been shut down by the police due the bizarre imagery catching the attention of the police, who in turn shut it down due to the traffic violations involved, including driving a motorcycle without a helmet, and driving cars without seatbelts. The video contains alternating shots of Kelly and Barker performing the song, and surrealist imagery such as Kelly walking around in a bald cap and revealing outfit, having black-dyed eggs thrown at him, and playing an oversized guitar.

During a live televised performance at the 2021 VMA awards, Kelly including a rap verse towards the end of the song, the alternate rendition became a favorite amongst fans, as of July 2022, the performance has over 2.6 million views and 69k likes. A studio recorded version including the alternate rap verse was included in the main release of the Mainstream Sellout album, under the name "papercuts - album edit".

A live version of the song was featured in the Life in Pink deluxe version of the Mainstream Sellout album, titled "papercuts - live from redrocks". The song was recorded live throughout the duration of the songs performance at the Mainstream Sellout Tour in the Red Rocks Amphitheatre.

== Themes and composition ==
Multiple publications noted that "Papercuts" sounded to move even further into the rock sound than the material from his 2020 pop punk album Tickets to My Downfall. Loudwire noted that the song had more of a grunge sound to it, mixed with the material that Green Day and Weezer released in the 1990s. Vulture described it as "straight up rock" with "90's inspired guitar riffs". Guitar World likened the sound of the track to emo.

The song opens with an acoustic guitar intro, before intensifying into distorted power chords into the chorus. The track also ends with a guitar solo using a DigiTech Whammy pedal as well. Lyrically, publications interpreted it to be about Kelly exploring his personal struggles with fame and bad habits such as drug use.

"Papercuts" has been described as rock, punk rock, alternative rock, grunge-pop, pop punk and grunge.

== Reception ==
Music website Stereogum praised the track for being "pretty good", concluding that while they were surprised by Baker's move into alt-rock, that ultimately "a good song is a good song". Wall of Sound called it Baker's most mature song to date. Other publications were more critical of the track; BrooklynVegan felt it ripped off "Where Is My Mind?" by Pixies, while both Pitchfork and Sputnikmusic felt it was too similar to Green Day, specifically their song "Brain Stew".

== Personnel ==
- Machine Gun Kelly – vocals, guitars, songwriting
- Travis Barker – drums, production, songwriting
- Nick Long - guitar, songwriting

== Charts ==
=== Weekly charts ===
Weekly chart performance for "Papercuts"
Chart (2021)	Peak position
Australia (ARIA)	73
Canada Hot 100 (Billboard)	57
Global 200 (Billboard)	99
Ireland (IRMA)	90
New Zealand Hot Singles (RMNZ)	18
UK Singles (Official Charts)	74
UK Hip Hop/R&B (Official Charts)	34
US Alternative Airplay (Billboard)	14
US Billboard Hot 100	79
US Hot Rock & Alternative Songs (Billboard)	9
US Rock & Alternative Airplay (Billboard)	34

=== Year-end charts ===
Year-end chart performance for "Papercuts"
Chart (2021)	Position
US Hot Rock & Alternative Songs (Billboard)	66
