= Willow Smith discography =

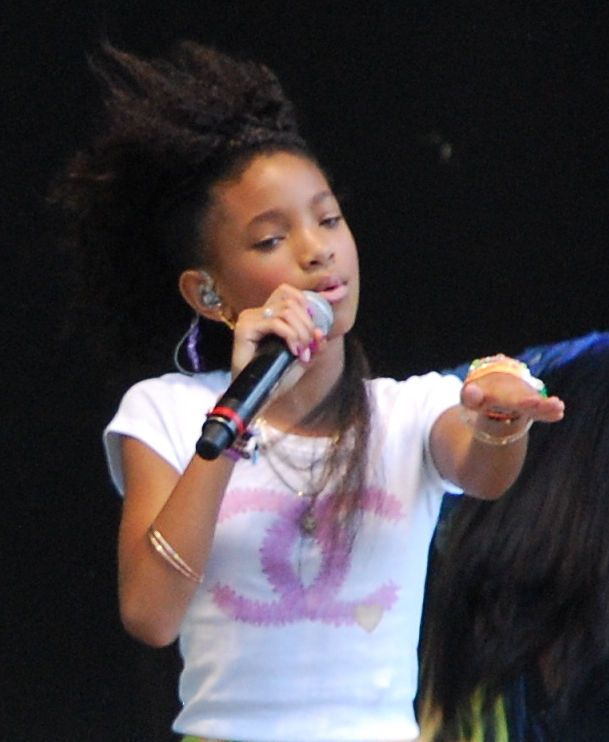
- Smith in 2011
- Studio albums: 8
- EPs: 4
- Singles: 19
- Music videos: 10
- Promotional singles: 2

American singer Willow Smith, known mononymously as Willow, has released eight solo studio albums, one collaborative studio album, four extended plays, nineteen singles (including four as a featured artist), two promotional singles and ten music videos. In 2010, Willow released her debut single "Whip My Hair", which peaked at number 11 on the US Billboard Hot 100 and at number 2 on the UK Singles Chart. The song was certified Platinum in the US, Gold in Canada and Silver in the United Kingdom. After the follow-up singles "21st Century Girl" and "Fireball" failed to reach the same level of success as "Whip My Hair", Willow took a hiatus from music.

On December 11, 2015, Willow released her first full-length album, Ardipithecus, through Roc Nation; it peaked on the Heatseekers Albums chart at number 15. The album saw her depart from her earlier pop-oriented sound to embrace experimental neo soul and alternative R&B. She followed it up with the folk-influenced The 1st (2017), and the psychedelic-inspired Willow (2019). In 2020 she released the collaborative album The Anxiety with Tyler Cole.

Willow experienced a commercial and critical resurgence in 2021 following her fourth album Lately I Feel Everything, produced by Willow and Cole, which saw her delve into a heavier punk rock and emo sound, received critical acclaim, and debuted at number 45 on the Billboard 200, her first entry on the chart. It spawned the single "Transparent Soul", which peaked at number 76 on the Hot 100, becoming her first charting song in a decade. The same year, "Meet Me at Our Spot", an album track from The Anxiety went viral on TikTok. The song peaked at number 21, her first Top 40 hit since "Whip My Hair".

Willow moved further toward jazz fusion styles with the 2022 album Coping Mechanism, and the 2024 album Empathogen received two Grammy Award nominations, one for the single "Big Feelings". Empathogen topped the Top Contemporary Jazz Albums chart in May 2024. Chris Greatti produced Coping Mechanism and helped produce Empathogen. Willow teamed with Jon Batiste to produce Petal Rock Black which hit number 3 on the Contemporary Jazz Albums chart in February 2026. She returned to Greatti to co-produce the eighth album The Thread which debuted at number 8 on the U.S. Top Jazz Albums chart in August 2026.

== Albums ==
=== Studio albums ===
List of studio albums, with selected chart positions
Title	Album details	Peak chart positions				
Title	Album details	US	US Alt	US Indie	US Rock	SCO
Ardipithecus	Released: December 11, 2015; Label: Roc Nation, Interscope; Formats: Digital download, streaming	— (Note: Ardipithecus did not enter the US Billboard 200, but charted at number 15 on the US Heatseekers Albums chart.)	—	—	—	—
The 1st	Released: October 31, 2017; Label: Roc Nation; Formats: Digital download, streaming	—	—	—	—	—
Willow	Released: July 19, 2019; Label: Roc Nation, MSFTSMusic; Format: CD, LP, digital download, streaming	— (Note: Willow did not enter the US Billboard 200, but charted at number 22 on the US Heatseekers Albums chart.)	19	—	—	—
Lately I Feel Everything	Released: July 16, 2021; Label: Roc Nation, MSFTSMusic, Polydor; Format: CD, LP, cassette, digital download, streaming	46	5	6	10	84
Coping Mechanism	Released: October 7, 2022; Label: Roc Nation, MSFTSMusic; Format: Digital download, streaming	—	—	—	—	—
Empathogen	Released: May 3, 2024; Label: Three Six Zero Records, gamma.; Format: CD, LP, digital download, streaming	—	—	—	—	—
Petal Rock Black	Released: February 17, 2026; Label: Three Six Zero Recordings	—	—	—	—	—
The Thread	Released: July 24, 2026; Label: Three Six Zero Recordings	—	—	—	—	—
"—" denotes a recording that did not chart or was not released in that territory.

=== Collaborative albums ===
List of collaborative studio albums, with selected chart positions
Title	Album details	Peak chart positions				
Title	Album details	US	US Alt	US Indie	US Rock	CAN
The Anxiety (as the Anxiety with Tyler Cole)	Released: March 13, 2020; Label: Roc Nation, MSFTSMusic; Format: LP, digital download, streaming	103	11	13	17	77

== EPs ==
List of extended plays, with selected details
Title	Details
3	Released: October 31, 2014; Label: Roc Nation; Format: Digital download
Interdimensional Tesseract	Released: January 10, 2015; Label: Self-released; Format: Streaming
Mellifluous	Released: December 7, 2016; Label: Self-released; Format: Streaming
Rise (with Jahnavi Harrison)	Released: November 20, 2020; Label: MSFTSMusic, Roc Nation; Format: Streaming, download digital

== Singles ==
=== As lead artist ===
List of singles as lead artist, with selected chart positions and certifications, showing year released and album name
Title	Year	Peak chart positions										Certifications	Album
Title	Year	US	US Rock	AUS	BEL (FL)	CAN	IRE	NZ	SWE	UK	WW	Certifications	Album
"Whip My Hair"	2010	11	—	18	28	18	11	35	—	2	—	RIAA: 3× Platinum; ARIA: Platinum; BPI: Gold; MC: Gold	Non-album singles
"21st Century Girl"	2011	99	—	—	62	—	36	—	—	91	—		Non-album singles
"Fireball" (featuring Nicki Minaj)	2011	—	—	—	108	—	—	—	—	—	—		Non-album singles
"F Q-C #7"	2015	—	—	—	—	—	—	—	—	—	—		Non-album singles
"Why Don't You Cry"	2015	—	—	—	—	—	—	—	—	—	—		Ardipithecus
"Wait a Minute!"	2016	—	— (Note: "Wait a Minute" did not enter the Billboard Hot Rock & Alternative Songs chart but did peak at number five on the Alternative Streaming Songs chart.)	25	73	—	75	24	— (Note: "Wait a Minute!" did not enter the Swedish Singellista Chart, but peaked at number 11 on the Swedish Heatseeker Chart.)	— (Note: "Wait a Minute!" did not enter the UK Singles Chart, but peaked at number 84 on the UK Streaming Chart.)	43	RIAA: 2× Platinum; ARIA: 3× Platinum; BPI: Platinum; RMNZ: 4× Platinum	Ardipithecus
"Romance"	2017	—	—	—	—	—	—	—	—	—	—		The 1st
"Hey, You!" (as the Anxiety with Tyler Cole)	2020	—	—	—	—	—	—	—	—	—	—		The Anxiety
"Transparent Soul" (featuring Travis Barker)	2021	76	10	—	94	54	26	37	—	28	84	RIAA: Platinum; BPI: Silver; RMNZ: Gold	Lately I Feel Everything
"Lipstick"	2021	—	—	—	—	—	—	—	—	—	—		Lately I Feel Everything
"Meet Me at Our Spot" (as the Anxiety with Tyler Cole)	2021	21	3	8	33	22	4	6	65	10	21	RIAA: 2× Platinum; ARIA: Platinum; BPI: Platinum; MC: Gold; RMNZ: 3× Platinum	The Anxiety
"Gaslight" (featuring Travis Barker)	2021	—	—	—	—	—	—	—	—	—	—		Lately I Feel Everything
"Emo Girl" (with Machine Gun Kelly)	2022	77	9	78	49	64	71	— (Note: "Emo Girl" did not enter the Official New Zealand Music Chart but did peak at number 11 on the NZ Hot Singles Chart.)	— (Note: "Emo Girl" did not enter the Sverigetopplistan Singles chart, but did peak at number 15 on the Heaseekers chart.)	52	91	RIAA: Gold; MC: Gold	Mainstream Sellout
"Purge" (featuring Siiickbrain)	2022	—	—	—	—	—	—	—	—	—	—		Non-album single
"Memories" (with Yungblud)	2022	—	—	—	—	—	—	—	—	—	—		Yungblud
"Maybe It's My Fault"	2022	—	—	—	—	—	—	—	—	—	—		Coping Mechanism
"Hover Like a Goddess"	2022	—	—	—	—	—	—	—	—	—	—		Coping Mechanism
"Curious/Furious"	2022	—	—	—	—	—	—	—	—	—	—		Coping Mechanism
"Split"	2022	—	—	—	—	—	—	—	—	—	—		Coping Mechanism
"Alone"	2023	—	—	—	—	—	—	—	—	—	—		Non-album single
"Symptom of Life"	2024	—	—	—	—	—	—	—	—	—	—		Empathogen
"Big Feelings"	2024	—	—	—	—	—	—	—	—	—	—		Empathogen
"Talk on the Hill"	2026	—	—	—	—	—	—	—	—	—	—		The Thread
"She's My Religion"	2026	—	—	—	—	—	—	—	—	—	—		The Thread
"—" denotes a title that did not chart, or was not released in that territory.

=== As featured artist ===
List of singles as featured artist, showing year released and album name
Title	Year	Peak chart positions								Album
Title	Year	US	US Rock	CAN	IRE	NZ Hot	SWE	UK	WW	Album
"Buzzed" (¿Téo? featuring Willow)	2021	—	—	—	—	—	—	—	—	Sol
"Swipe Right!" (Dani Bby featuring Willow)	2021	—	—	—	—	—	—	—	—	Non-album single
"Psychofreak" (Camila Cabello featuring Willow)	2022	75	—	41	49	5	85	73	50	Familia
"Where You Are" (PinkPantheress featuring Willow)	2022	—	22	—	69	8	—	58	—	Non-album single
"—" denotes a title that did not chart, or was not released in that territory.

=== Promotional singles ===
List of promotional singles, showing year released and album name
Title	Year	Album
"Do It Like Me (Rockstar)"	2012	Non-album singles
"I Am Me"	2012	Non-album singles

== Other charted songs ==
List of other charted songs, with selected chart positions, showing year released and album name
Title	Year	Peak chart positions		Certifications	Album
Title	Year	US Rock	NZ Hot	Certifications	Album
"Summertime in Paris" (Jaden featuring Willow)	2019	—	14	RIAA: Gold	Erys
"Grow" (with Avril Lavigne featuring Travis Barker)	2021	46	—		Lately I Feel Everything
"—" denotes a title that did not chart, or was not released in that territory.

== Guest appearances ==
Title	Year	Other artist(s)	Album
"Find You Somewhere"	2012	Jaden, AcE	The Cool Cafe: Cool Tape Vol. 1
"Keep Ya Love"	2014	Jaden	CTV2
"Let It Breathe"	2014	Jaden	CTV2
"Electric"	2014	Jaden	CTV2
"PCH"	2014	Jaden	CTV2
"Vegetables"	2016	Jesse Boykins III, Syd	Bartholomew
"Queen of High School"	2016	Hana Vu	Non-album song
"Rose Golden"	2016	Kid Cudi	Passion, Pain & Demon Slayin'
"B"	2017	Jaden, Pia Mia	Syre
"Adventure Time Main Title"	2018	Pendleton Ward, Casey James Basichis	Adventure Time: Come Along With Me (Original Soundtrack)
"P"	2019	Jaden	Erys
"Summertime in Paris"	2019	Jaden	Erys
"Tunnels"	2024	Lalah Hathaway	VANTABLACK
"Running Around"	2024	Childish Gambino, Fousheé	Bando Stone & the New World
"100,000 Voices"	2024	Jacob Collier	Djesse Vol. 4
"Noid"	2024	Tyler, the Creator	Chromakopia
"Girls Will Be Girls"	2026	Flowerovlove	Mini Skirt Warrior
"The Golden Egg of Empathy"	2026	The Claypool Lennon Delirium	The Great Parrot-Ox and the Golden Egg of Empathy

== Music videos ==
List of music videos, showing year released and directors.
Title	Year	Director	Ref.
As lead artist
"Whip My Hair"	2010	Ray Kay	
"21st Century Girl"	2011	Rich Lee	
"Fireball" (featuring Nicki Minaj)	2011	Hype Williams	
"Do It Like Me (Rockstar)"	2012	Willow	
"I Am Me"	2012	Mike Vargas	
"Summer Fling"	2013	Willow and Mike Vargas	
"F Q-C #7"	2015	Willow and Mike Vargas	
"Wit a Indigo"	2015	Ben Tan	
"Why Don't You Cry"	2015	Mike Vargas	
As featured artist
"Find You Somewhere" (AcE featuring Jaden and Willow)	2012	Jada Pinkett Smith	
