= Hover Like a Goddess =

2022 single by Willow

Single by Willow

from the album Coping Mechanism
- Released: August 5, 2022
- Genre: Pop-punk; garage-punk; emo-rock
- Length: 2:23
- Label: MSFTS; Roc Nation
- Songwriters: Willow; Chris Greatti
- Producer: Chris Greatti

Willow singles chronology
"Maybe It's My Fault" (2022)	"Hover Like a Goddess" (2022)	"Curious/Furious" (2022)

Visualizer
- "Hover Like a Goddess" on YouTube

"Hover Like a Goddess" (stylized as "hover like a GODDESS") is a song by the American singer Willow from her fifth studio album, Coping Mechanism (2022). It was released through MSFTS Music and Roc Nation on August 5, 2022, as the album's second single, alongside a visualizer directed by Jaxon Whittington. Willow wrote the song with its producer and engineer, Chris Greatti.

Musically, "Hover Like a Goddess" is a pop-punk, garage-punk, and emo-rock song, which followed the revival of these styles experimented by Willow on her previous album, Lately I Feel Everything (2021). A love song with a sapphic theme, the lyrical content address the narrator's affection for a woman and desire for the reciprocity. Upon its release, the song received positive reviews from music critics, mainly for its sound, and was named by NME one of the best songs from 2022. Willow performed it at the 2022 edition of Lollapalooza.

== Background and release ==
Willow's fourth studio album, Lately I Feel Everything, was released in July 2021. It marked a departure from her former R&B music in order to lean towards a pop-punk and emo sound, following a revival of the genres. She later collaborated with various artists, including Machine Gun Kelly, Camila Cabello, and PinkPantheress; she served as an opening act for the former's Mainstream Sellout Tour (2022). Her solo single "Maybe It's My Fault", released in June 2022, followed the sound of the previous album and incorporated metalcore and nu-metal influences, with a screamo ending. Al Newstead of the Australian ABC News reported that Willow's next album would be exploring her "heavier side".

Willow announced "Hover Like a Goddess" on social media on August 2, 2022. The following day, she announced the follow-up album Coping Mechanism, and revealed that "Hover Like a Goddess" would be shared days later. The song was released as scheduled on August 5. An accompanying visualizer, directed by Jaxon Whittington, premiered at the same time on Willow's YouTube channel; it sees the singer performing in the dark besides an unseen presence wearing black boots. She performed "Hover Like a Goddess" at Lollapalooza; introducing the song, she described it as "an ode to the divine goddess within us all", and said, "Every woman deserves to be worshiped." An official footage of the performance was shared to social media.

== Composition ==
"Hover Like a Goddess" is two minutes and twenty-three seconds long. It was written by Willow and its producer, Chris Greatti; the latter played guitar and bass while Asher Bank provided drums. Greatti also engineered the track. Randy Merrill was the mastering engineer and Mitch McCarthy served as the mixing engineer.

Musically, "Hover Like a Goddess" is a pop-punk, garage-punk, and emo-rock track, with elements of ska, punk rock, and nu-metal. The song has two breakdowns and is led by guitar riffs, drums, and bass. Andrew Unterberger of Billboard described it as "almost new wavey" and compared it to the works of the indie rock band Bloc Party. NME's Kyann-Sian Williams drew similarities with songs by the band Reel Big Fish, while Exclaim!'s Noah Ciubotaru compared it to Hayley Williams.

The lyrical content of "Hover Like a Goddess" is about the narrator's affection for a woman and her desire for love. A love song with a sapphic theme, the song addresses feelings of lust and yearning. In the chorus, Willow sings, "I'll never be fine if you won't be mine", before repeating it in a soft voice. She finds the woman "addictive", and mentions a series of lusty confessions, "Just meet me under the covers/Baby, I wish". Zoya Raza-Sheikh from Rolling Stone UK described the song as a "confident anthem of sexuality"; in response, Willow said that it was her way to "express my gratitude for the feminine", when she believed there was "political violence against women".

== Reception ==
Upon its release, "Hover Like a Goddess" was met with positive reviews from music critics. Some publications included it on lists of the best music from its release week; Ellie Beeck from V praised Willow's vocal performance on the track, while Unterberger praised the decision of having two breakdowns despite its short length. The New York Times's Lindsay Zoladz believed that the song is "further proof that Willow has finally found her lane" in the song's genres. Neil Z. Yeung from AllMusic praised the "pogo-bopping" sound. NME named "Hover Like a Goddess" the 21st best song from 2022, and the magazine's Ali Shutler wrote that it was Willow's "unique vision" following the pop-punk revival.
