= Maybe It's My Fault =

Single by Willow

from the album Coping Mechanism
- Released: June 24, 2022
- Genre: Pop punk; alt-rock; alternative metal
- Length: 2:42
- Label: MSFTS; Roc Nation
- Songwriters: Willow; Chris Greatti; Asher Bank
- Producer: Chris Greatti

Willow singles chronology
"Memories" (2022)	"Maybe It's My Fault" (2022)	"Hover Like a Goddess" (2022)

Music video
- "Maybe It's My Fault" on YouTube

"Maybe It's My Fault" (stylized "<maybe> it's my fault") is a song by American singer Willow. It was released on June 24, 2022, through Roc Nation, as the lead single from Willow's fifth studio album, Coping Mechanism (2022). "Maybe It's My Fault" was written by Willow, Asher Bank, and the song's producer Chris Greatti.

== Background and release ==
Prior to the release of "Maybe It's My Fault", Willow appeared as a guest on Yungblud's song "Memories". The producer of "Memories", Chris Greatti, worked with Willow on "Maybe It's My Fault", which was released on June 24, 2022, and is the first single from Willow's fifth studio album Coping Mechanism. It is Willow's first track since the release of her fourth studio album Lately I Feel Everything (2021).

== Composition ==
"Maybe It's My Fault", which has been described as pop-punk and alt-rock, begins with a riff driven by an electric guitar. Willow's vocals are wallowed. The song's melodious chorus contrasts with the prior verse's focused rhythm. Following the song's verse-chorus section, the end of "Maybe It's My Fault" showcases Willow screaming in an "alternative-metal breakdown", with an electric guitar solo.

Willow sings in "Maybe It's My Fault" about a speculative failure of a relationship involving her and another woman. She ponders over her role in the destruction of the relationship.

== Music video ==
The music video for "Maybe It's My Fault", directed by Dana Trippe, shows Willow pacing around her room "as she moves... between moments of frustration and others of near-serenity".

== Personnel ==
Credits adapted from Spotify.

- Willow Smith – performer, songwriter
- Chris Greatti – songwriter, producer
- Asher Bank – songwriter
