= U Know =

U Know may refer to:

- "U Know", a song by Prince from the album Art Official Age
- "U Know", a song by Reks from Rhythmatic Eternal King Supreme
- "U know", a song by Willow from her 2019 album Willow
- Yunho, artist who performs under the stage name U-Know

== See also ==
- "You know", a phrase frequently used as a discourse marker
