= Big Feelings =

2024 single by Willow

Single by Willow

from the album Empathogen
- Released: April 11, 2024
- Genre: Jazz fusion; progressive rock
- Length: 4:24
- Label: Three Six Zero; Gamma
- Songwriters: Willow; Chris Greatti; Zach Tenorio
- Producers: Willow; Chris Greatti

Willow singles chronology
"Symptom of Life" (2024)	"Big Feelings" (2024)

Visualizer
- "Big Feelings" on YouTube

"Big Feelings" (stylized as "b i g f e e l i n g s") is a song by American singer Willow from her sixth studio album, Empathogen (2024). Music companies Three Six Zero and Gamma released the song on April 11, 2024, as the second single from the album. It was written and produced by Willow and Chris Greatti, with additional songwriting from Zach Tenorio.

== Background and release ==
In 2022, Willow signed to music companies Three Six Zero and Gamma after leaving Roc Nation, the label she was under since 2010. "Big Feelings" was released as the second single from Empathogen (2024), following "Symptom of Life", on April 11, 2024. Its release was accompanied by the announce of the album and an official visualizer, in which Willow stands in front of black backdrop with a yellow and green circle. It was shot at the same place of the music video to the singer's 2021 single "Transparent Soul". Willow performed "Big Feelings" for the first time as part of her Tiny Desk Concert hosted by NPR Music, which was published on May 1, 2024.

== Composition ==
"Big Feelings" was written by Willow, Chris Greatti, and Zach Tenorio, with production from the first two. Willow named "Big Feelings" her favorite song of hers and "one of the best compositions that [she has] ever sang on". She stated that she made the song with a perfect ending and closure to the album in mind. In an interview with The Hollywood Reporter, Willow explained that she choose "Big Feelings" as the last song on the album because she "wanted to end on a really complicated, grandiose note", and to honor "the complexity and grandiosity of [the] song". It is a piano-based track, described by Willow as "dense and dissonant but also darkly beautiful". In a statement, she also said: "Musically, it has a darkness and complexity that reflects what we all experience in our own minds. The song is about accepting those intense feelings that you have no idea what to do with".

== Critical reception ==
Music critics of The New York Times named "Big Feelings" as one of the most notable new tracks from its release week. Essence also included it on a list of the Best New Music of the Week. The magazine Out described "Big Feelings" as an "experimental masterpiece for the ears", in which Willow "mash[es] genres and tempos". Dork's Ali Shutler described it as a "beautiful, empathetic song about overwhelming emotions and hard-fought acceptance". Dylan Green from Pitchfork said that the chorus of the song that begins, "I have such big feelings", sounds "ripped from a rejected High School Musical: The Musical: The Series script".

In June 2024, "Big Feelings" was added by Rolling Stone and The New York Times to their mid-year lists of the best songs, with a critic from the former describing it as a "soaring and chaotic" showstopper. The staff of Billboard included it on its year-end list, with Kyle Denis naming it as a career highlight.

== Accolades ==
Awards and nominations for "Big Feelings"
Organization	Year	Category	Recipient	Result	Ref.
Grammy Awards	2025	Best Arrangement, Instrumental and Vocals	Willow	Nominated	
