= Empathogen (album) =

- Standard edition cover

Studio album by Willow
- Released: May 3, 2024
- Genres: Alternative, pop rock, acoustic
- Length: 32:00
- Labels: Three Six Zero; Gamma.
- Producers: Jon Batiste; Eddie Benjamin; Chris Greatti; Willow

Willow chronology
Coping Mechanism (2022)	Empathogen (2024)	Petal Rock Black (2026)

Singles from Empathogen
- 1. "Symptom of Life" Released: March 12, 2024; 2. "Big Feelings" Released: April 11, 2024; 3. "Home" Released: May 2, 2024; 4. "Pain for Fun" Released: May 2, 2024; 5. "Run!" Released: May 17, 2024

Empathogen is the sixth album by the American singer Willow. It was released through Three Six Zero and Gamma on May 3, 2024. The album was preceded by a slew of singles, including "Symptom of Life", "Big Feelings", "Home", and "Paint for Fun" and "Run!". Empathogen was met with critical acclaim and received Grammy Award nominations for Best Arrangement, Instruments and Vocals and Best Engineered Album, Non-Classical. The album peaked at number 1 on the U.S. Top Contemporary Jazz Albums Chart.

== Release and promotion ==
Willow released the song "Symptom of Life" on March 12, 2024. A music video directed by the artist herself accompanied the song's release. Willow announced Empathogen on April 11, with a scheduled release date of May 3. Alongside the announcement, she released the second single "Big Feelings", which also featured a self-directed music video. Jon Pareles of The New York Times wrote that "Big Feelings" "veers from her old pop-punk into jazz and prog-rock". On May 1, NPR Music featured Willow in a Tiny Desk Concert ahead of the album's release, where she performed "Symptom of Life", "Big Feelings", and another track from the album, "Run!". Empathogen was released on May 3, through Three Six Zero and Gamma. A deluxe edition titled Ceremonial Contrafact was released on September 27, with three additional tracks.

== Critical reception ==
Empathogen was met with generally favorable reviews from music critics, who frequently praised its musical ambition, genre experimentation, and maturity. Several reviewers viewed the album as a significant development in Willow's artistry. Dylan Green of Pitchfork described it as her "most mature and well-rounded album to date," praising its fusion of jazz, funk, Indian raga, and Gregorian chant, as well as its songwriting, arrangements, and production. Adonis Gonzalez of In Between Drafts similarly characterized the album as Willow "finally coming into her own", highlighting the maturity of her vocals and songwriting and the greater intentionality of its compositions. Imani Raven of Shatter the Standards likewise viewed the album as an evolution in Willow's sound, praising its experimentation and describing it as a showcase for her growth and maturity.

Critics particularly noted the album's stylistic range and complex arrangements. SPIN included Empathogen among its best albums of 2024 to that point, observing that Willow had shifted from the power chords of her previous work toward complex arrangements featuring jazz piano and a more relaxed vocal style. TIME also selected the album among its ten best albums of the first half of 2024, highlighting Willow's vocal versatility and the interplay between scatting, guitar work, and layered harmonies. Charles Elliott of Okayplayer similarly praised the album's more jazz-oriented and intricate musical approach, particularly Willow's use of her voice as an instrument on "I Know That Face". A.R.O. of Sputnikmusic described Willow as a "sonic shape-shifter" and praised the album's "open-armed, genreless" style.

Some critics, however, found limitations in the album's songwriting and brevity. Green wrote that Willow's lyrics could sometimes rely on generalized aphorisms and that some songs leaned heavily on the influence of other artists, while Anthony Fantano of The Needle Drop praised the album's creativity and performances but felt that several of its shorter tracks ended before their musical ideas could be fully developed. The album subsequently appeared on several mid-year and year-end lists. Dork ranked Empathogen 25th on its list of the 50 best albums of 2024, while HuffPost and Okayplayer included it among their selections for the year's best albums.

Professional ratings
Review scores
Source	Rating
HotNewHipHop	4.5/5 stars
In Between Drafts	8/10
The Needle Drop	7/10
Pitchfork	6.8/10
The PROG Mind	8.5/10
Shatter the Standards	4/5 stars
Sputnikmusic	4.3/5

=== Accolades ===
Mid-Year & Year-End lists
Publication	List	Rank	Ref.
Dork	The 50 Best Albums of 2024	25	
HuffPost	The Best Albums of 2024	N/A	
Okayplayer	The 50 Best Albums of 2024	N/A	
Spin	The Best Albums of 2024 (So Far)	N/A	
TIME	The Best Albums of 2024 (So Far)	N/A	
Uproxx	The Best Albums of 2024 (So Far)	N/A	

== Track listing ==
Empathogen standard track listing
No.	Title	Writer(s)	Producer(s)	Length
1.	"Home" (featuring Jon Batiste)	Willow Smith; Jon Batiste; Kate Munger	Smith; Batiste; Zach Brown^{[a]}	3:03
2.	"Ancient Girl"	Smith	Smith	1:30
3.	"Symptom of Life"	Smith; Asher Bank; Chris Greatti; Brad Oberhofer	Smith; Greatti	3:09
4.	"The Fear Is Not Real"	Smith; Greatti	Smith; Greatti	3:38
5.	"False Self"	Taylor Gordon; Greatti	Smith; Greatti	2:52
6.	"Pain for Fun" (featuring St. Vincent)	Smith; Annie Clark; Greatti	Smith; Greatti	3:26
7.	"No Words 1 & 2"	Smith; Eddie Benjamin	Smith; Benjamin	1:24
8.	"Down"	Smith; Benjamin	Smith; Benjamin	1:11
9.	"Run!"	Smith; Greatti	Smith; Greatti	3:08
10.	"Between I and She"	Smith; Bank; Greatti; Elijah Rawk	Smith; Greatti; Rawk^{[a]}	2:34
11.	"'I Know That Face.'"	Smith; Benjamin	Smith; Benjamin	1:50
12.	"Big Feelings"	Smith; Greatti; Zach Tenorio	Smith; Greatti	4:24
Total length:				32:00

Ceremonial Contrafact (Empathogen deluxe) track listing
No.	Title	Writer(s)	Producer(s)	Length
13.	"Wanted" (featuring Kamasi Washington)	Smith; Benjamin; Kamasi Washington	Smith; Benjamin	2:39
14.	"Layers"	Smith; Benjamin	Smith; Benjamin	2:37
15.	"To You"	Smith; Antonio Mollura	Smith	1:30
Total length:				39:03

Notes

- ^{^[a]} signifies an additional producer

== Personnel ==
Musicians

- Willow Smith – lead vocals (all tracks), guitar (tracks 1, 2), background vocals (4, 5), electric guitar (4, 9)
- Zach Brown – bass guitar, percussion (track 1)
- Jon Batiste – drums, piano, vocals (track 1)
- Chris Greatti – bass guitar (tracks 3–6, 9, 10, 12), guitar (3, 5), percussion (3–5, 9), acoustic guitar (4, 6, 9, 10), piano (9), electric guitar (10, 12)
- Asher Bank – drums (tracks 3, 4, 6, 9, 10, 12)
- Brad Oberhofer – piano (track 3)
- Zach Tenorio – piano, synthesizer (tracks 5, 6, 12); strings (5)
- Annie Clark – vocals (track 6)
- Eddie Benjamin – bass guitar, drums, guitar, synthesizer (tracks 7, 8, 11)
- Elijah Rawk – acoustic guitar, bass guitar (track 10)

Technical

- Joe LaPorta – mastering
- Mitch McCarthy – mixing
- Zach Brown – engineering (tracks 1, 2)
- Adam Schoeller – engineering (track 3)
- Chris Greatti – engineering (track 3)
- Oscar Cornejo – engineering (track 11)

== Charts ==
Chart performance for Empathogen
Chart (2024)	Peak position
US Top Contemporary Jazz Albums (Billboard)	1
US Top Jazz Albums (Billboard)	3
