= Tierra Whack =

American rapper and singer (born 1995)

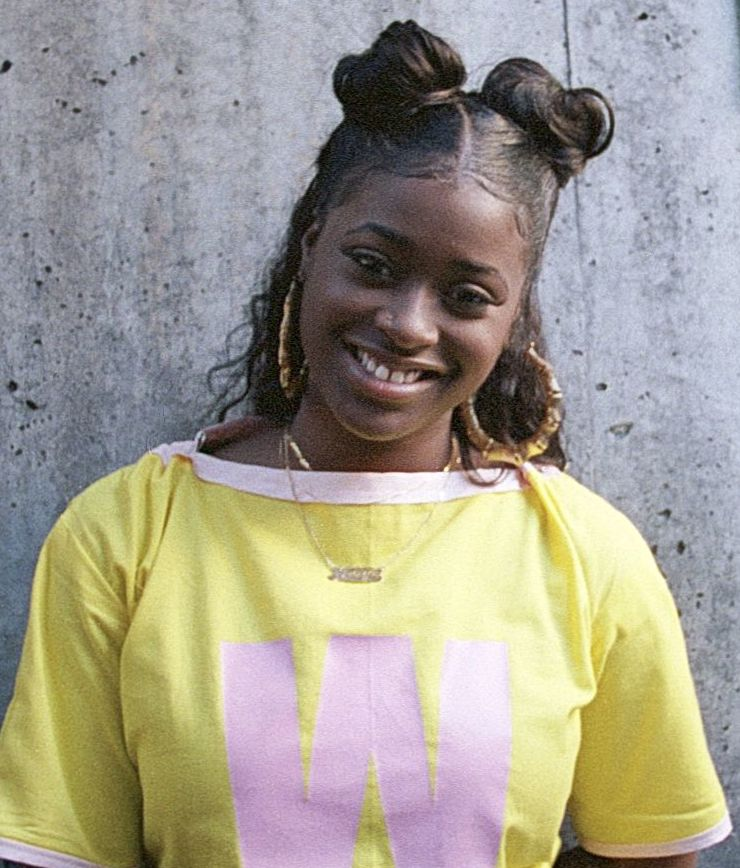
- Whack in 2018

Background information
- Also known as: Dizzle Dizz
- Born: Tierra Helena Whack; August 11, 1995 (age 31); Philadelphia, Pennsylvania, U.S.
- Genres: Hip-hop; R&B; experimental hip-hop
- Occupations: Rapper; singer; songwriter; actress
- Years active: 2011–present
- Label: Interscope
- Website: tierrawhackmerch.com

Tierra Helena Whack (born August 11, 1995) is an American rapper and singer. She originally performed under the stage name "Dizzle Dizz" as a teenager but reverted to her birth name in 2017. Her debut mixtape, Whack World, was released in May 2018 and received widespread critical acclaim. Her song "Mumbo Jumbo" was nominated for Best Music Video at the 61st Annual Grammy Awards. Whack has since collaborated with artists including Beyoncé, Alicia Keys, Tyler, the Creator, Chief Keef, and Melanie Martinez.

== Early life and education ==
Whack was born in 1995 and grew up living with two younger siblings and their mother in North Philadelphia. In a 2018 interview with The Fader, Whack mentioned that she and her father are estranged. She was an introverted child who wrote to help herself deal with insecurities. As a child, Whack loved the author Dr. Seuss to the extent that she would rhyme the sentences together in her homework assignments.

Whack pinpointed the exact moment when her love for rhyming began. She had to rhyme for a homework assignment for class and after receiving positive feedback, she continued with it. She later asked her mother for composition books to fill with rhymes and lyrics before she eventually started recording herself.

Whack attended The Arts Academy at Benjamin Rush in Philadelphia for three years before finishing high school in Atlanta. At Benjamin Rush, she was a vocal major and was one of the few black students in a predominantly white graduating class. With some difficulty, she and her friends persuaded their principal to let them perform the finale from Sister Act 2: Back in the Habit for the school vocal showcase; Whack performed a rap verse in the song. Later in Whack's career, she toured with Lauryn Hill, who starred in the 1993 film.

At around fifteen, Whack who went by the moniker "Dizzle Dizz" appeared in a 2011 freestyle video produced by Philadelphia's underground music collective We Run the Streets. Her mother drove past the group of men freestyling and encouraged her to join. She released several tracks as Dizzle Dizz including "Dizzy Rascvls", but struggled with depression in the months afterwards. Despite being a teenager, Whack gained notoriety in the streets of Philadelphia as "Dizzle Dizz." Although she had growing fame, Whack grew bored. There was no way to make money in freestyling and no way to creatively grow. She claimed there was little experimentation and growth beyond battle rapping if she were to stay in Philadelphia. Her mother elected to move out of Philadelphia so Whack could finish school. After going to Atlanta with her mother, Whack began working at a Mister Car Wash allowing her to save for a Mac laptop and start recording her music. She was often the only woman working on the line at the car wash, and her former manager said she was a memorable person with an impressive drive, which Whack credits to her mother.

In Atlanta, Whack kept a low profile, having felt the effects of fame back home. She wanted to keep to herself to have a chance to solely focus on her music. By the time she returned to Philadelphia, she had a laptop full of two years' worth of music, which she never ended up sharing with anyone. She left her family behind in Atlanta. During that time she was homeless for three months and hopped around staying at friends' homes but refused to return to Atlanta. She believed staying in Philadelphia would be best for her music career.

== Musical career ==
=== 2015–2017: Career beginnings ===
By 2015, Whack was in Philadelphia and she reconnected with Kenete Simms, a sound engineer and music producer whom she knew from her teenage years. Whack credits Simms as being her collaborator. After she returned to working with Simms she learned how to properly mix her own music. Simms helped her use equipment in order to help her make music more easily. In 2017, she signed with Interscope Records; Johnny Montina is her manager.

In March 2017, Whack made her debut as Tierra Whack with three tracks, including "Toe Jam" and "Sh_ Happens". In October 2017, she released "Mumbo Jumbo", a hip-hop single and accompanying music video which featured the young rapper performing while wearing a mouth prop. Most of the lyrics to the track are purposefully unintelligible. She also toured with Flying Lotus in 2017.

=== 2018–2023: Whack World and weekly singles ===
Whack's debut fifteen-track mixtape, Whack World, was released on May 30, 2018, and received a "Best New Music" accolade from Pitchfork. Critics praised the unusual format of the album—each song lasting precisely one minute. She released each short track on Instagram, each accompanied by a short film directed by Thibaut Duverneix and Mathieu Léger. The multimedia project received widespread critical acclaim. Robert Christgau gave the album an A-minus and reported in Vice that his wife, fellow critic Carola Dibbell, loved the video, saying, "it gave me reason for living".

Often referred to as the "Missy Elliott" of this generation, Whack has gained a great amount of acclaim for the creativity and eccentricity of her music videos. The track "Mumbo Jumbo" received a nomination for Best Music Video for the 2019 Grammy Awards. In October 2018, Whack traveled to Tokyo for a long-term artistic sabbatical.

In an episode of Genius' The Cosign series on YouTube in which current artists who have been in the industry have the opportunity to watch videos of newer artists, rapper Remy Ma chose to cosign Whack. Even though she mentioned seeing potential in each of the artists, Remy said, "I pick(ed) her because I feel like she brought the entire package as far as the song, the delivery, the vocals, and the actual visual. I feel like she did something that was super out of the ordinary, and I enjoyed it... I wanna watch it again." In the episode of The Cosign, Whack's music video for her single "Unemployed" was put in a group with music videos from other female MCs including Kash Doll, CupcakKe, Mulatto, Tay Money, and That Girl Lay Lay.

She has recorded as-yet-unreleased music with Meek Mill and Childish Gambino. In 2018, she toured with 6lack on his world tour, From East Atlanta with Love. Briana Younger, the writer for The Fader, wrote that "popular and mainstream rap hasn't championed a darker-skinned woman since Missy Elliot...and Whack seems poised to be the one." Whack acknowledged that women in the music industry often aren't afforded the privilege to make art for art's sake, but she refuses to let that inhibit her. Beginning February 19, 2019, Whack released one single per week for five weeks in a series she called "#whackhistorymonth." These singles included "Only Child", "Clones", "Gloria", "Wasteland", and "Unemployed". Whether these tracks will be released under a full-length album has not yet been revealed. Whack has said that she is not thinking about a timeline for a new album, saying "I'm not gonna drive myself crazy. I'm having fun creating what I'm creating." Whack collaborated with Flying Lotus on the song "Yellow Belly" for his 2019 album Flamagra and she was later named as one of the members of XXL's "2019 Freshman Class" on June 20, 2019. She appeared at many festivals in the 2019 festival season including Coachella, Primavera Sound, Lollapalooza, Outside Lands, Camp Flog Gnaw, Osheaga, and Austin City Limits. Her song "Unemployed" is featured in the football game FIFA 20.

Whack co-wrote and was featured in Melanie Martinez's single "Copy Cat", which was released on February 10, 2020. It marks the first time that Whack has worked in a professional capacity with Melanie Martinez. In May 2020, Whack appeared alongside American rapper Lil Yachty on the song "T.D" which features rappers ASAP Rocky and Tyler, the Creator. The song was #84 on the Billboard Hot 100 and Whack's first entry on the chart. She featured on the song "Me x 7" by Alicia Keys, taken from her seventh studio album, Alicia, in September 2020. Her 2017 single, "Mumbo Jumbo", had an accompanying music video that garnered a Best Music Video nomination for the 2019 Grammy Awards.

In October 2020, Whack released her first solo single of the year titled "Dora". In November 2020, she appeared in the 2020 Apple holiday commercial "The Magic of Mini" which featured the new singles, "Peppers and Onions" and "feel good" which were released coinciding with the introduction of the commercial. In April 2021, she released a single titled "Link". The music video, created in partnership with the LEGO Group, had Whack sit with a group of schoolchildren as part of Lego's "Rebuild the World" campaign, using their ideas as inspiration for the video. In December 2021, she released three EPs, Rap?, Pop? and R&B?.

=== 2024–2026: World Wide Whack and Whack's Museum ===
On March 15, 2024, Whack released her 2nd studio album "World Wide Whack" under Interscope Records; it received a 7.3 on the Pitchfork web site. In June 2024, she performed a Tiny Desk Concert featuring some songs from her new album; "Mood Swing","Accessible", "Ms. Behave", "Imaginary Friends", "Moovies", "27 Club" and "Shower Song" as well as earlier favorites: "Flea Market", "Pretty Ugly", and "Hungry Hippo". The concert featured the mascot Phillie Phanatic as a proud supporter of her birth city quoting "anything Philly is all me".

Whack, on 19 June 2026, dropped her second mixtape "Whack's Museum" consisting of 12 songs, with a running time of 27 minutes. The new mixtape follows her 2024 album "World Wide Whack"

== Artistry ==
Whack cites Outkast, Erykah Badu, Busta Rhymes, and Kelis as some of her musical influences. Whack claims there are many different things which inspire and motivate her and she wants to be able to portray those to her fans in her music. She credits Sesame Street and the children's book No! David as some of her influences; that is clearly seen through her visuals from her album's music video. Her inspirations come from everything, from her relationships to people to inanimate objects. Her single, "Only Child", for example, was created after dating a man whose behaviour she aligned with that of someone who grew up an only child.

Whack's mother is often credited as one of if not the biggest inspirations for her music. She recalls her mother playing gangster rap during car rides. For her single "Unemployed", her mother helped her create the key musical hook.

== Personal life ==
Whack has written poetry since she was a child. Writing was a way for her to deal with her shyness and insecurities. She is also an accomplished spoken word performer.

She lives in Philadelphia with her mother and her two siblings. She is still "Philly-based," saying that Philadelphia is her home and where she feels grounded. She owns a cat, whom she named Starkey after the Whole Foods brand of sparkling water. She does not drink alcohol or smoke cigarettes. She is severely allergic to insects, a condition she satirizes in the music video for her 2018 track, "Bugs Life".

== Discography ==
=== Studio albums ===
List of mixtapes, with selected details
Title	Mixtape details
World Wide Whack	Released: March 15, 2024; Label: Interscope; Format: LP, CD, digital download, streaming

=== Mixtapes ===
List of mixtapes, with selected details
Title	Mixtape details
Whack World	Released: May 30, 2018; Label: Interscope; Format: LP, digital download, streaming
Whack's Museum	Released: June 19, 2026; Label: Interscope; Format: LP, digital download, streaming

=== Extended plays ===
List of EPs, with selected details
Title	EP details
Rap?	Released: December 2, 2021; Label: Interscope; Format: Digital download, streaming
Pop?	Released: December 9, 2021; Label: Interscope; Format: Digital download, streaming
R&B?	Released: December 16, 2021; Label: Interscope; Format: Digital download, streaming

=== Singles ===
==== As lead artist ====
List of singles as a lead artist, showing year released
Title	Year	Peak Chart Positions		Album
Title	Year	US	NZ Hot	Album
"Toe Jam"	2017	—	—	Non-album singles
"Child Please"	2017	—	—	Non-album singles
"Shit Happens"	2017	—	—	Non-album singles
"Mumbo Jumbo"	2017	—	—	Non-album singles
"Hungry Hippo"	2019	—	—	Whack World
"Only Child"	2019	—	—	Non-album singles
"Clones"	2019	—	—	Non-album singles
"Gloria"	2019	—	—	Non-album singles
"Wasteland"	2019	—	—	Non-album singles
"Unemployed"	2019	—	—	Non-album singles
"T.D" (with Lil Yachty featuring ASAP Rocky & Tyler, the Creator)	2020	83	11	Lil Boat 3
"Dora"	2020	—	—	Non-album singles
"Peppers and Onions"	2020	—	—	Non-album singles
"Feel Good"	2020	—	—	Non-album singles
"Link"	2021	—	—	Non-album singles
"8"	2021	—	—	Madden NFL 22
"Walk The Beat"	2021	—	—	Non-album single
"Chanel Pit"	2023	—	—	World Wide Whack
"Shower Song"	2024	—	—	World Wide Whack
"27 Club"	2024	—	—	World Wide Whack
"Bon Voyage" (with Girlfriend)	2025	—	—	It’s Complicated
"Tip Toe"	2025	—	—	Him
"Wax Paper"	2026	—	—	Whack’s Museum
"Totem"	2026	—	—	Whack’s Museum

==== As featured artist ====
List of singles as a featured artist, showing year released
Title	Year	Album
"Pull Up on You" (Temi Oni featuring Tierra Whack)	2018	Non-album singles
"Copy Cat" (Melanie Martinez featuring Tierra Whack)	2020	Non-album singles
"Me x 7" (Alicia Keys featuring Tierra Whack)	2020	Alicia

=== Guest appearances ===
List of non-single guest appearances, with other performing artists, showing year released and album name
Title	Year	Other performer(s)	Album
"Yin/Yang"	2019	Student 1	Upprclssmn
"Yellow Belly"	2019	Flying Lotus	Flamagra
"My Power"	2019	Beyoncé, Moonchild Sanelly, Nija	The Lion King: The Gift
"Xtra"	2021	Willow	lately i feel EVERYTHING
"Black Magic Woman"	2022	—N/a	Minions: Rise of Gru (Original Motion Picture Soundtrack)
"Banded Up"	2024	Chief Keef	Almighty So 2
"Champion"	2024	Sia, Kaliii, Jimmy Jolliff	Reasonable Woman
"Internet"	2025	Lizzo	My Face Still Hurts from Smiling

== Filmography ==
=== Film ===
Year	Title	Role	Notes
2020	Black Is King	Herself	
2022	Hustle	Herself	
2025	Him	Adrienne	

=== Television ===
Year	Title	Role	Notes
2020	Dave	Herself	Episode: "What Wood You Wear?"
2020	The Shivering Truth	Bully (voice)	Episode: "The Diff"

=== Video games ===
Year	Title	Role	Notes
2020	Grand Theft Auto Online	FlyLo MC Guest	The Cayo Perico Heist update
2026	Invincible VS	Ella Mental / Beatrice Washington	
