= Symptom of Life =

2024 single by Willow

Single by Willow

from the album Empathogen
- Released: March 12, 2024
- Genre: Math-pop
- Length: 3:09
- Label: Three Six Zero; Gamma
- Songwriters: Willow; Asher Bank; Chris Greatti; Brad Oberhofer
- Producers: Willow; Chris Greatti

Willow singles chronology
"Alone" (2023)	"Symptom of Life" (2024)	"Big Feelings" (2024)

Music video
- "Symptom of Life" on YouTube

"Symptom of Life" is a song by American singer Willow from her sixth studio album, Empathogen (2024). She wrote it with Chris Greatti and Brad Oberhofer, and produced it with the former. The song was released through Three Six Zero and Gamma on March 12, 2024, as the lead single from the record. An accompanying self-directed music video was published on the same date. "Symptom of Life" is a math-pop track led by piano, drums, and a bass countermelody.

== Release ==
The release of "Symptom of Life" was announced via Willow's Instagram account on March 5, 2024, alongside a snippet of the song, which she captioned, "y'all are not ready". Days before the release of the single, she shared the lyrics to the track, explaining that it could let listeners "deeply digest the words before diving into the whole composition". The song was released on March 12, 2024, as the lead single from her then-upcoming sixth studio album, Empathogen (2024). A music video for "Symptom of Life", directed by Willow, premiered alongside the song; it opens with Willow and two friends walking through a forest, and then sees the singer lying down on the floor, a large rock, and on grass strewn with flowers. About the visual, she said that it "is for all the beautiful people who have ever gone into nature with their friends & been guided to a deeper understanding of life together by plant medicine".

== Composition ==
"Symptom of Life" is a math-pop song based on a jazzy piano, drums, and a bass countermelody. Its lyrics center on self-knowledge, reinvention, mortality, and beauty. In a statement, the singer discussed the track's production: "It has a very beautiful, whimsical nature but holds a lot of mystery. There's this beautiful light coming in through the piano, but also this syncopated rhythm of the bass, bringing in that mysterious element — a juxtaposition of light and dark".

In an interview with Vogue Australia, Willow stated that the song "came from a very special place", and explained: "Buddha said that life is suffering ... that is definitely true. A symptom of life is pain, suffering and loss, but another symptom of life is birth, and renewal and joy. I like that that song was kind of an exploration of [that]".

== Critical reception ==
Pitchfork's Dylan Green said that the song "best illuminated the next phase in Willow's [sound] evolution", following her experimenting with various music genres throughout her career.
