= Coping Mechanism (album) =

Studio album by Willow
- Released: October 7, 2022
- Genres: Pop-punk; emo; grunge; hard rock
- Length: 29:14
- Labels: MSFTS Music; Roc Nation
- Producer: Chris Greatti

Willow chronology
| Lately I Feel Everything (2021) | Coping Mechanism (2022) | Empathogen (2024) |

Singles from Coping Mechanism
- 1. "Maybe It's My Fault" Released: June 24, 2022; 2. "Hover Like a Goddess" Released: August 5, 2022; 3. "Curious/Furious" Released: September 9, 2022; 4. "Split" Released: October 3, 2022; 5. "Ur a Stranger" Released: October 7, 2022

Coping Mechanism (stylized as <COPINGMECHANISM>) is the fifth studio album by American singer Willow. It was released on October 7, 2022, through MSFTS Music and Roc Nation. The album was preceded by a slew of singles, including "Maybe It's My Fault", "Hover Like a Goddess", "Curious/Furious", and "Split".

== Release and promotion ==
Willow released the song "Maybe It's My Fault" on June 24, 2022. It was reported to be the lead single from Coping Mechanism, which at the time was unnamed and scheduled to be released in the summer. A music video accompanied the song's release, which was directed by Dana Trippe. Willow released the second single, "Hover Like a Goddess" on August 4. A music video directed by Jaxon Whittington was released with the song. The following day, Coping Mechanism was announced. It was scheduled for release on September 23. Willow released "Curious/Furious" and its video on September 9. The song serves as the album's third single. After the single's release, Coping Mechanism was rescheduled. The album's new release date was set as October 7. On October 3, Willow released "Split" as the album's fourth single. Coping Mechanism was released on October 7, through Roc Nation and MSFTSMusic. The following day, Willow performed two tracks on the album, "Ur a Stranger" and "Curious/Furious" on Saturday Night Live.

== Composition ==
Coping Mechanism is a pop-punk, emo,grunge rock, and hard rock album with elements of metal, post-hardcore, gothic rock, ska punk, indie rock, screamo, guitar pop, R&B, and "avant-garde electro".

== Critical reception ==
Professional ratings
Aggregate scores
| Source | Rating |
|---|---|
| AnyDecentMusic? | 7.4/10 |
| Metacritic | 82/100 |
Review scores
| Source | Rating |
| AllMusic | 4.5/5 stars |
| Consequence | 9.1/10 |
| DIY | 3.5/5 stars |
| Evening Standard | 4/5 stars |
| The Guardian | 4/5 stars |
| Kerrang! | 4/5 |
| NME | 4/5 stars |
| Pitchfork | 6.7/10 |
| Rolling Stone | 4/5 stars |
| The Telegraph | 4/5 stars |

Coping Mechanism received acclaim upon release, with Metacritic awarding the album 82/100 based on 11 reviews, indicating "universal acclaim". Alexis Petridis of The Guardian said that Coping Mechanism "sounds confident", and called it the work of an artist who knows their sound is popular at the moment. Petridis said the album was his favorite of the week. Maura Johnston of Rolling Stone called Coping Mechanism a must-hear album. She commented that Willow's artistic ambition was matched in the record's quality. Kyann-Sian Williams for NME said that Willow adds "a new level of maturity" to her songs and you can tell that Willow is using her own influences "to make her own seminal sound."

Concluding the review for AllMusic, Neil Z. Yeung called the album a, "head-spinning journey is a thrill to experience and, clocking in at less than a half hour, fit for repeat listens." and claimed that, "While much of Willow's charm lies in the way she can switch genres with ease, Coping Mechanism is so engaging that it'd be nice for her to stick to this sound for at least one more album before continuing her ever-riveting evolution."

=== Accolades ===
Year-end lists
| Publication | List | Rank | Ref. |
|---|---|---|---|
| Alternative Press | The Best Albums of 2022 | N/A | |
| Esquire | The 50 Best Albums of 2022 | N/A | |
| Good Morning America | The 50 Best Albums of 2021 | 35 | |
| Kerrang! | The 50 Best Albums of 2022 | 28 | |
| Rolling Stone | The 100 Best Albums of 2022 | 99 | |

== Track listing ==
Track listing for Coping Mechanism
| No. | Title | Writer(s) | Length |
|---|---|---|---|
| 1. | "Maybe It's My Fault" | Willow; Chris Greatti; Asher Bank | 2:42 |
| 2. | "Falling Endlessly" | Willow; Greatti; Bank | 2:54 |
| 3. | "Curious/Furious" | Willow; Greatti | 3:04 |
| 4. | "Why?" | Willow; Greatti; Bank | 2:58 |
| 5. | "Coping Mechanism" | Willow; Greatti | 2:45 |
| 6. | "Split" | Willow; Greatti; Bank | 3:21 |
| 7. | "Hover Like a Goddess" | Willow; Greatti | 2:23 |
| 8. | "Ur a Stranger" | Willow; Greatti | 2:05 |
| 9. | "Perfectly Not Close to Me" (with Yves Tumor) | Willow; Greatti; Yves Tumor | 1:52 |
| 10. | "No Control" | Willow; Greatti | 2:48 |
| 11. | "Batshit!" | Willow; Greatti; Bank; Liam Hall | 2:22 |
| Total length: | | | 29:14 |

Notes

- "Maybe It's My Fault" is stylized as "<maybe> it's my fault"
- "Curious/Furious" is stylized in lowercase
- "Why?" and "Batshit!" are stylized in all caps
- "Coping Mechanism" is stylized as "<Coping Mechanism>"
- "Hover Like a Goddess" is stylized as "hover like a GODDESS"
- "Ur a Stranger" is stylized as "ur a <stranger>"
- On some digital platforms, the clean version of "Batshit!" is simply titled "Track 11"

== Personnel ==
Musicians

- Willow – lead vocals (all tracks), background vocals (tracks 3–11)
- Chris Greatti – guitar (all tracks), bass guitar (1–5, 7–9), drums (3, 9), percussion (3), background vocals (4)
- Asher Bank – drums (1, 2, 4–8, 10, 11)
- Ryan Wheeler – bass guitar (6, 10)
- Yves Tumor – background vocals (9)
- Zach Tenorio – Mellotron, piano (10)
- Liam Hall – organ (10); Mellotron, programming, synthesizer (11)
- Brad Bowers – bass guitar (11)

Technical

- Chris Greatti – production, engineering
- Yves Tumor – production (9)
- Liam Hall – additional production (11)
- Randy Merrill – mastering
- Mitch McCarthy – mixing
- Dave Kutch – immersive mix engineering (3)

== Charts ==
Chart performance for Coping Mechanism
| Chart (2022) | Peak position |
|---|---|
| Australian Hitseekers Albums (ARIA) | 14 |
