= Rap? =

2021 EP by Tierra Whack

EP by Tierra Whack
- Released: December 2, 2021
- Recorded: 2021
- Genre: Hip hop
- Length: 8:39
- Label: Interscope
- Producer: J-Louis; J Melodic; Sam Gellaitry; T-Minus

Tierra Whack chronology
Whack World (2018)	Rap? (2021)	Pop? (2021)

Rap? is the debut EP by American rapper Tierra Whack. It was released on December 2, 2021, by Interscope Records. The album is mainly produced by J Melodic and conscripts other producers including J-Louis, Sam Gellaitry and T-Minus. It's the first installment of her style-changing EP trilogy, and was followed by the next installments Pop? and R&B? the same year.

== Critical reception ==
Professional ratings
Review scores
Source	Rating
Pitchfork	6.0/10

The EP received positive reviews. Pitchfork gave the EP a 6.0 out of 10 rating, saying: "The Philadelphia rapper's new EP may be more straightforward than usual, but even at her most conventional, Whack is at least attempting to keep you off-balance."

== Track listing ==
No.	Title	Writer(s)	Producer(s)	Length
1.	"Stand Up"	Tierra Whack; Jesse Mapson III	J Melodic	2:45
2.	"Meagan Good"	Whack; Sam Gellaitry; Joshua Huizar; Tyler Williams; Barry Gibb; Robin Gibb	Gellaitry; J-Louis; T-Minus	2:57
3.	"Millions"	Whack; Mapson	J Melodic	2:55
