= Mark Gillespie (talent manager) =

British talent manager and businessperson

- Born: Solihull, England
- Occupations: Talent manager; CEO, Three Six Zero Entertainment
- Years active: 2007–present
- Labels: Three Six Zero Recordings
- Website: www.mark--gillespie.com

Mark Gillespie is a British businessman and talent manager. He is the co-founder of Three Six Zero, a music management and entertainment company founded in London and now based in Los Angeles. Gillespie has been involved in the career development of artists such as Calvin Harris and oversees a multi-disciplinary talent-management operation.

== Early life ==
Gillespie was born in Solihull, United Kingdom. He began his career at the Birmingham superclub Godskitchen, starting as a street promoter before moving into web development and digital support. During his time there, he helped launch Godskitchen Online, an early internet service provider linked to the brand, and later took over talent booking for the venue.

== Calvin Harris ==
Gillespie discovered Scottish DJ and producer Calvin Harris on Myspace while working as a talent booker for the Global Gathering festival and subsequently became Harris’s manager. He signed Harris as his first client in 2007, the year Harris released his debut album "I Created Disco."

In 2020, Gillespie brokered the sale of Harris’s publishing catalogue to Vine Alternative Investments for a reported US$100 million.

== Three Six Zero ==
In 2007, Gillespie and Dean Wilson co-founded Three Six Zero, which later expanded into film and digital entertainment.

In 2011, Three Six Zero entered a strategic partnership with Roc Nation, collaborating on live events, recording projects and brand deals.

In 2014, Gillespie launched a record-label and publishing division Warner Music and Warner Chappell Music, signing acts including Good Times Ahead, Cut Snake, Anabel Englund and the Prodigy.

Following Wilson’s departure in 2017, Gillespie restructured the company and, in 2018, relaunched the label as a joint venture with Sony Music. The following year, Pete Tong was appointed president of the label.

During Gillespie’s tenure Three Six Zero has represented artists including Frank Ocean, Kid Cudi, Jaden and Willow Smith, Swedish House Mafia, and Muse.

In 2019 Gillespie, together with partners including actor Will Smith, acquired the Hollywood talent-management company Westbrook Entertainment.

The following year he joined a group of investors in Stem, a music-distribution and payments platform.

In 2022, Three Six Zero bought London’s Sarm Studios, previously owned by producer Trevor Horn, and partnered with UK management firm Palm Artists to broaden its European activities. In August the company integrated the roster and staff of Forward Motion Artists led by Jazz Spinder, Attilio Pugliese and Chris Schiraldi into its management operation.

In March 2024, Three Six Zero signed a distribution and marketing deal with gamma. In February 2025, Three Six Zero Recordings signed a global distribution agreement with ADA, Warner Music Group’s independent distribution and artist-services division.

== Film and television ==
Gillespie produced the feature film Vox Lux starring Natalie Portman and Jude Law.

He is also credited as executive producer on The Brutalist (starring Adrien Brody, Joe Alwyn and Felicity Jones) and Marching Powder (starring Danny Dyer).

In 2023, Gillespie led the funding for True Brit Entertainment, a theatrical distributor founded by Zygi Kamasa focusing on British feature films and television.

== Honours and recognition ==
In 2021, Gillespie was included in Billboard's "Change Agents" list and was featured in Music Business Worldwide's World's Greatest Managers series.
