= Meet Me at Our Spot =

2021 single by The Anxiety

- Live version cover

Single by the Anxiety

from the album The Anxiety
- Released: October 5, 2021
- Genre: Alternative rock
- Length: 2:42
- Label: MSFTS; Roc Nation
- Songwriters: Tyler Cole; Willow Smith
- Producers: Tyler Cole; Willow

The Anxiety singles chronology
"Hey You!" (2020)	"Meet Me at Our Spot" (2021)

Willow singles chronology
"Swipe Right!!" (2021)	"Meet Me at Our Spot" (2021)	"Gaslight" (2021)

Tyler Cole singles chronology
"Tomorrow" (2020)	"Meet Me at Our Spot" (2021)

Performance video
- "Meet Me at Our Spot" on YouTube

"Meet Me at Our Spot" is a song by American duo the Anxiety, consisting of American singers Willow Smith and Tyler Cole. It was initially released through MSFTSMusic and Roc Nation on March 13, 2020, from the band's self-titled debut album. On October 5, 2021, the song was released as a single to contemporary hit radio.

== Background ==
Though the song did not chart at the time of its 2020 release, it became a sleeper hit in 2021 after becoming popular on TikTok, with users incorporating it as the soundtrack to their summer, or playing it in the background of cartoon videos.

Kelsey Garcia of Popsugar felt the song "is a sludgy alternative track with emo undertones that hits at the zeitgeist and is pretty inescapable on TikTok."

== Chart performance ==
After it became a viral hit on TikTok, the song entered various charts, reaching No. 21 on the US Billboard Hot 100, becoming Willow's highest-charting entry since "Whip My Hair" (2010), as well as her second Top 40 hit on the chart. It also reached the Top 10 in Australia, Ireland, New Zealand and UK.

== Charts ==
=== Weekly charts ===
Weekly chart performance for "Meet Me at Our Spot"
Chart (2021–2022)	Peak position
Australia (ARIA)	8
Austria (Ö3 Austria Top 40)	60
Belgium (Ultratop 50 Flanders)	33
Canada Hot 100 (Billboard)	22
Canada AC (Billboard)	37
Canada CHR/Top 40 (Billboard)	18
Canada Hot AC (Billboard)	33
Germany (GfK)	93
Global 200 (Billboard)	21
Ireland (IRMA)	4
Lithuania (AGATA)	18
Netherlands (Single Top 100)	84
New Zealand (Recorded Music NZ)	6
Portugal (AFP)	59
Slovakia (Singles Digitál Top 100)	49
South Africa (RISA)	34
Sweden (Sverigetopplistan)	65
Switzerland (Schweizer Hitparade)	55
UK Singles (Official Charts)	10
US Billboard Hot 100	21
US Adult Pop Airplay (Billboard)	23
US Dance Airplay (Billboard)	40
US Hot Rock & Alternative Songs (Billboard)	3
US Pop Airplay (Billboard)	12

=== Year-end charts ===
2021 year-end performance for "Meet Me at Our Spot"
Chart (2021)	Position
US Hot Rock & Alternative Songs (Billboard)	20

2022 year-end chart performance for "Meet Me at Our Spot"
Chart (2022)	Position
Canada (Canadian Hot 100)	84
Global 200 (Billboard)	141
US Billboard Hot 100	74
US Hot Rock & Alternative Songs (Billboard)	9
US Mainstream Top 40 (Billboard)	35

== Certifications ==
Certifications for "Meet Me at Our Spot"
Region	Certification	Certified units/sales
Australia (ARIA)	Platinum	70,000^{‡}
Brazil (Pro-Música Brasil)	2× Platinum	80,000^{‡}
Canada (Music Canada)	Gold	40,000^{‡}
New Zealand (RMNZ)	3× Platinum	90,000^{‡}
Poland (ZPAV)	Gold	25,000^{‡}
Portugal (AFP)	Gold	5,000^{‡}
United Kingdom (BPI)	Platinum	600,000^{‡}
United States (RIAA)	2× Platinum	2,000,000^{‡}
^{‡} Sales+streaming figures based on certification alone.

== Release history ==
Release dates and formats for "Meet Me at Our Spot"
Region	Date	Format(s)	Label	Version	Ref.
United States	October 5, 2021	Contemporary hit radio	Roc Nation	Original	
Various	October 22, 2021	Digital download; streaming	Roc Nation; MSTFSMusic	Live	
