= Joe LaPorta =

American music mastering engineer

- Born: Joseph J. LaPorta; January 19, 1980 (age 46)
- Origin: New York City, U.S.
- Occupations: Mastering engineer, record producer
- Website: sterling-sound.com/engineers/joe-laporta

Joseph J. LaPorta (born January 19, 1980) is an American mastering engineer at Sterling Sound in Edgewater, New Jersey.

== Career ==
LaPorta was born in New York and grew up there; he graduated from New York University with a bachelor's degree in music technology. He began his mastering career at The Lodge and then joined Sterling Sound in 2013 as a senior engineer.

He has worked with artists including David Bowie, The Weeknd, Future, Foo Fighters, Vampire Weekend, FKA Twigs, Miley Cyrus, Carrie Underwood, Tiesto, Imagine Dragons, Shawn Mendes, Fleet Foxes, Bon Jovi, Kid Cudi, 21 Savage, Run the Jewels, Young Thug, Gunna, Twenty One Pilots, Beach House, and others.

In addition to mastering, LaPorta also works as a music consultant on forensic musicology/copyright infringement cases. He has consulted on cases like The Beatles, Michael Jackson, Prince, Jay-Z, Britney Spears, Shakira, Guns N' Roses, Eminem, Mary J. Blige, Lady Gaga, The Black Eyed Peas, Sting, Phil Collins, Diddy, Alicia Keys, and others.

LaPorta also has experience in music production; he has worked with various artists in both hip hop and electronic dance music for over the past decade as of August 2012. He has written and produced for artists such as 50 Cent, GZA, Talib Kweli, Pharoahe Monch and Cunninlynguists as well as licensing tracks to television and film clients like MTV, Showtime, and Fox Network.

== Awards and nominations ==
Grammy Awards

Year	Nominee / work	Award	Result
2012	Wasting Light	Album of the Year	Nominated
2014	"Radioactive"	Record of the Year	Nominated
2017	Blackstar	Best Engineered Album, Non-Classical	Won
2018	Every Where Is Some Where	Best Engineered Album, Non-Classical	Nominated
2022	Cinema	Best Engineered Album, Non-Classical	Nominated
2024	Endless Summer Vacation	Album of the Year	Nominated
2024	"Flowers"	Record of the Year	Won
2025	Empathogen	Best Engineered Album, Non-Classical	Nominated

Latin Grammy Awards

Year	Nominee / work	Award	Result
2014	Multi Viral	Album of the Year	Nominated
2014	Respira El Momento	Record of the Year	Nominated

TEC Awards

Year	Nominee / work	Award	Result
2012	Wasting Light	Record Production/Album	Won
2016	Smoke + Mirrors	Record Production/Album	Nominated
2017	Blackstar	Record Production/Single or Track	Won
2017	Blackstar	Record Production/Album	Won
2019	America	Record Production/Album	Nominated

Pensado Awards

Year	Nominee / work	Award	Result
2016	Joe LaPorta	"Masters of Mastering"	Won
