= Whack World =

2018 studio album by Tierra Whack

Mixtape by Tierra Whack
- Released: May 30, 2018
- Recorded: 2017–2018
- Genre: Hip-hop
- Length: 14:56
- Label: Interscope
- Producers: Kenete Simms; Nick Verruto; J Melodic; RicandThadeus; DJ Fly Guy; Scott Styles

Tierra Whack chronology
Whack World (2018)	Rap? (2021)

Singles from Whack World
- 1. "Hungry Hippo" Released: February 14, 2019

Whack World is the debut mixtape by American rapper Tierra Whack. It was released on May 30, 2018, by Interscope Records. The album is mainly produced by Kenete Simms and Nick Verruto, and conscripts other producers including J Melodic, RicandThadeus, DJ Fly Guy, and Scott Styles. It was mixed and engineered by Kenete Simms and mastered by Chris Athens. The album artwork—of an arcade claw machine—was designed by Nick Canonica and features a sculpture made by Philadelphia artist Caroline Kunka.

== Background ==
Whack was bullied as a child for being black in a predominantly white school, which inspired much of the "emotional labor" that was done on the album. With each song length being a minute long, Tierra Whack released a 15-minute visual album with a music video for each track. Whack says that she's a visual learner, and the visuals for Whack World allowed her to bring her ideas to life and "bring truth to the viewer's eye." Regarding the many changes in her voice, Whack spoke to Billboard saying:

I get so bored with my voice. It started when I was a class clown, and realized I was kind of funny. And it's bad because sometimes I'll still do it – I'll hear someone and they'll have a funny ass voice, and I'll mock it. But that's rude, so I'll have to [do it] somewhere alone, and mock the voice to like, get it out, and know I can do that voice. I'm a sponge, so I just hear these things.

== Critical reception ==
Professional ratings
Review scores
Source	Rating
The 405	8/10
HipHopDX	4.3/5
Pitchfork	8.3/10
RapReviews	8/10
Spectrum Culture	3.75/5 stars
Sputnikmusic	3.0/5
Vice (Expert Witness)	A−

The album was critically acclaimed and received positive reviews. Pitchfork praised the album, giving it an 8.3 out of 10 rating, saying: "Whack World is a funhouse of minute-long vignettes, teetering between a fantastic dream and an unsettling nightmare. Lyrics share double meanings with the corresponding 15-minute visual Whack released alongside the album, which adds even more dimension and intrigue to the ambitious project; light and dark are forced to coexist." The author also claimed that the visual album is "prepackaged for optimum social media consumption; every tiny piece stands on its own without losing sight of the larger picture. At its core, though, Whack's sense of humor—her captivating depiction of a black woman's imagination—is an opportunity to celebrate an aspect of art that often goes uncelebrated, an opportunity for Whack to celebrate herself." In a Wired piece about women in the music industry in 2019, the author wrote that Whack World was working to destabilize the popular maximalist narrative currently characterizing music. NPR hip hop writer Rodney Carmichael praised Whack's dream logic that characterizes the visual album, saying "each song vignette offers a deeper level of revelation into her black girl's blues."

=== Accolades ===
Year-end lists
Publication	Accolade	Rank
Billboard	50 Best Albums of 2018	19
Complex	The Best Albums of 2018	16
Dazed	20 Best Albums of 2018	1
Noisey	100 Best Albums of 2018	1
Okayplayer	The Best Albums of 2018	2
Pitchfork	The 50 Best Albums of 2018	9
Exclaim!	Top 10 Hip-Hop Albums of 2018	7
NPR Music	50 Best Albums of 2018	10

Decade-end lists
Publication	Accolade	Rank
BrooklynVegan	100 Best Rap and R&B Albums of the 2010s	60
Crack	The top 100 albums of the decade	86
Robert Christgau	Dean's List: The 2010s	13
NME	The Best Albums of the Decade: The 2010s	68
Pitchfork	The 200 Best Albums of the 2010s	38
Rolling Stone	The 100 Best Albums of the 2010s	91
Spin	The 101 Best Albums of the 2010s	10
Vice	The 100 best albums of the 2010s	21

== Track listing ==
No.	Title	Writer(s)	Producer(s)	Length
1.	"Black Nails"	Tierra Whack	Kenete Simms	0:58
2.	"Bugs Life"	Whack	Simms	0:58
3.	"Flea Market"	Whack	Simms	1:00
4.	"Cable Guy"	Whack; Nick Verruto	Verruto	1:00
5.	"4 Wings"	Whack; Simms	Simms	1:00
6.	"Hookers"	Whack; Verruto	Verruto	1:00
7.	"Hungry Hippo"	Whack; Verruto	Verruto	1:00
8.	"Pet Cemetery"	Whack; Simms	Simms	1:00
9.	"Fuck Off"	Whack; J Melodic	Melodic	1:00
10.	"Silly Sam"	Whack; Verruto	Verruto	1:00
11.	"Fruit Salad"	Whack; C. McMillan; RicandThadeus	RicandThadeus	1:00
12.	"Pretty Ugly"	Whack; Melodic; DJ Fly Guy	Melodic; DJ Fly Guy	1:00
13.	"Sore Loser"	Whack	Scott Styles	1:00
14.	"Dr. Seuss"	Whack; Simms	Simms	1:00
15.	"Waze"	Whack; Simms	Simms	1:00
Total length:				14:56
