= 21st Century Girl (song) =

Single by Willow
- Released: March 1, 2011
- Recorded: 2010
- Genre: Electropop
- Length: 3:00
- Label: Roc Nation; Columbia
- Songwriters: Joacim Persson; Niclas Molinder; Johan Alkenäs; Drew Ryan Scott; Omarr Rambert
- Producers: Alke; Twin; Tim Carter

Willow singles chronology
"Whip My Hair" (2010)	"21st Century Girl" (2011)	"Fireball" (2011)

"21st Century Girl" is a song by American singer Willow, released on March 1, 2011 through Roc Nation as a standalone single.

== Background ==
On January 22, 2011, Willow released a 16-second preview of the song on her Facebook page. The video clip of the song shows Willow on the set of the music video. 21st Century Girl is an upbeat dance song and was produced by Swedish production team Twin.

Willow debuted the full song on February 28 by performing the song on The Oprah Winfrey Show. It was released on iTunes the following day on, March 1, 2011.

== Live performances ==
Willow performed the song on The Oprah Winfrey Show, as well as at the 2011 Kids' Choice Awards. Willow performed at the White House Easter Egg Hunt. The song was also performed by Willow as a support act on UK dates of Justin Bieber's My World Tour.

== Music video ==
The video was released on March 7, 2011, and shows Cicely Tyson playing a nomadic tribal woman pulling Willow from the sand in a desert. Willow and her friends in the video then begin to pull an entire city out of the desert. The video was shot in Los Angeles and was directed by Rich Lee.

== Track listing ==
Digital download

1. "21st Century Girl" – 3:00
2. "21st Century Girl" (Jump Smokers Remix) - 3:29

== Charts ==
Chart (2011)	Peak position
Belgium (Ultratip Bubbling Under Flanders)	12
Belgium (Ultratip Bubbling Under Wallonia)	14
Ireland (IRMA)	36
Scotland Singles (Official Charts)	71
UK Singles (Official Charts)	91
US Billboard Hot 100	99

== Release history ==
Release dates and formats for "21st Century Girl"
Region	Date	Format	Label(s)	Ref.
United States	March 15, 2011	Mainstream airplay	Columbia	
