= Ardipithecus (album) =

- Original cover

Studio album by Willow
- Released: December 11, 2015
- Genre: Neo soul
- Length: 54:07
- Labels: Roc Nation; Interscope
- Producers: Willow Smith; AcE; JABS; Mel "Chaos" Lewis; James Chul Rim; Anthony Bell; James Darrell Robinson; DWayne E. Moore; Rayfield Holloman

Willow chronology
Interdimensional Tesseract (2015)	Ardipithecus (2015)	The 1st (2017)

Singles from Ardipithecus
- 1. "Why Don't You Cry" Released: September 18, 2015; 2. "Wait a Minute!" Released: December 11, 2015

Alternative cover
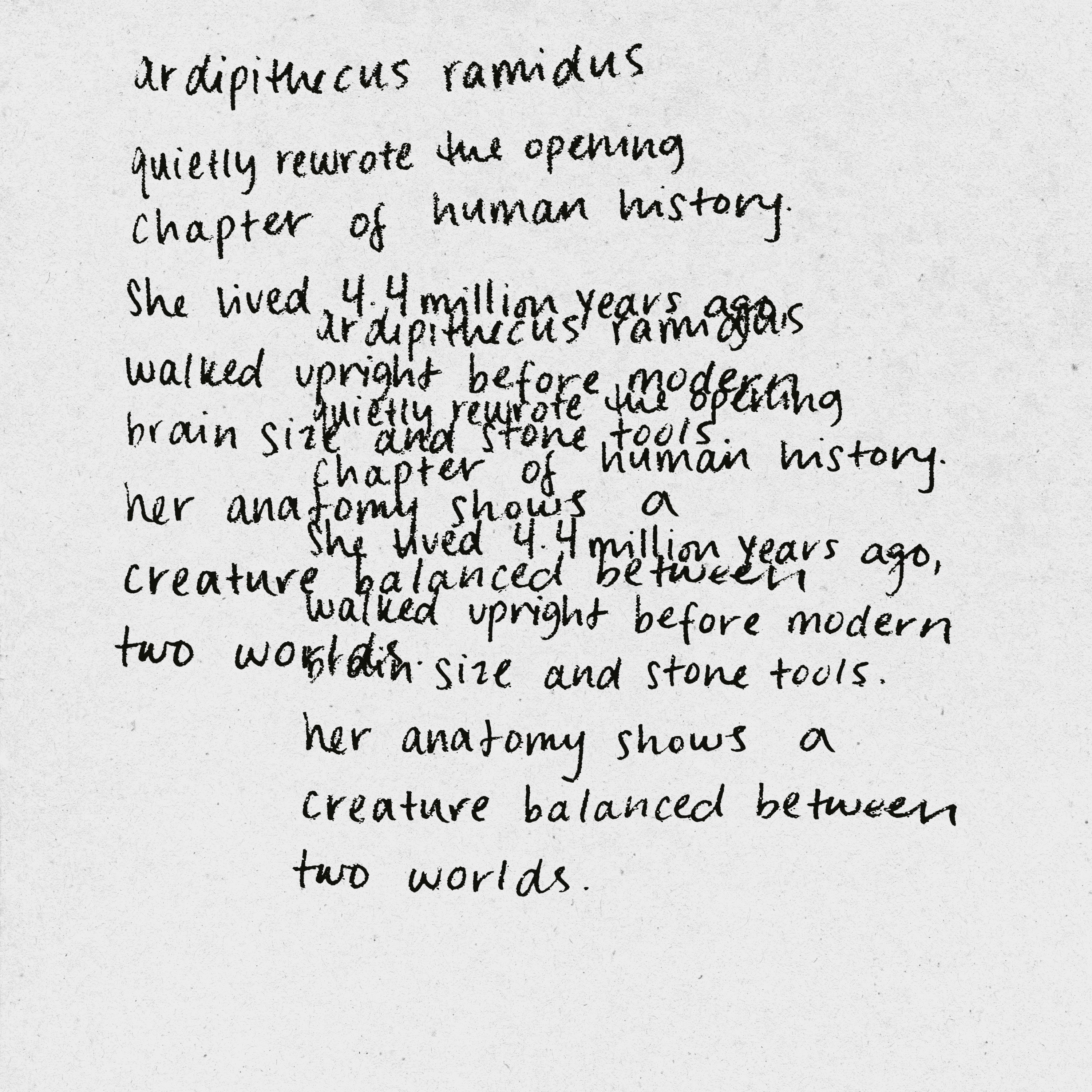
- Updated cover on streaming and digital platforms

Ardipithecus (stylized in all caps) is the debut studio album by American singer Willow. It was released on December 11, 2015 through Roc Nation and Interscope Records. Smith is credited as sole songwriter on 11 tracks, and sole producer on 10 of them. The album also features contributions from Smith's brother Trey Smith, under the moniker AcE, and frequent collaborator Jabs. The track "F Q-C #7" was released on May 7, 2015, with an accompanying music video. A video to the track "Why Don't You Cry" was also released on September 17.

The album takes its name from the genus of an extinct hominine of the same name.

== Background ==
In an e-mail interview with Fader, Smith explained the name choice:

Ardipithecus Ramidus (sic) is the scientific name of the first hominid bones found on earth. I wanted to name my musical compilation after it because, while I was making these songs I was in such a transitional state. Digging deep in the soil of my heart and finding bits and pieces of my ancient self that tell stories, which end up being the lyrics to the songs. Ardipithecus is my first album in my entire career and it makes me feel so blessed to be able to share my evolution with the LightEaters as I continue excavating my inner worlds…

== Critical reception ==
Professional ratings
Aggregate scores
Source	Rating
Metacritic	51/100
Review scores
Source	Rating
Consequence	D+
Now	2/5 Ns
Pitchfork	5.8/10
Tiny Mix Tapes	2.5/5 marks

The album received mixed reviews from critics. At Metacritic, which assigns a normalized rating out of 100 to reviews from critics, the album received an average score of 51, which indicates "mixed or average reviews", based on 5 reviews. Among these reviews, none were positive. Consequence of Sound critic Adam Kivel described the album as "impenetrable, even distancing." Kivel further wrote: "The album is a headscratcher, one that shows plenty of promise but also a personality abstruse to the point of mystification." Criticizing the album's musical simplicity and lyrics, The New York Times' Ben Ratliff called the album as "essentially a Bandcamp record released by Roc Nation."

Now critic Kevin Ritchie regarded that Ardipithecus' "undercooked production" as "a serious limitation." Ritchie further stated that the record "could've been distinctive but instead lacks depth or the transporting quality of her imaginative lyrics." Frank Farisi of Tiny Mix Tapes thought: "So much of listening to Ardipithecus feels immeasurable by good or bad." and concluded that the album "fails as a pop record, because it's barely aware that it's a part of that conversation."

== Track listing ==
All tracks are written by Willow Smith, except where noted. All tracks are produced by Smith, except where noted.

No.	Title	Writer(s)	Producer(s)	Length
1.	"Organization & Classification"			5:14
2.	"Natives of the Windy Forest"			2:31
3.	"Drugz"			3:08
4.	"Cycles"			3:39
5.	"F Q-C #8"			4:20
6.	"Not So Different" (featuring Jabs)	Smith; Jarah Bond		3:13
7.	"IDK"	Smith; Mel "Chaos" Lewis		4:18
8.	"Randomsong"			4:15
9.	"Marceline"			2:16
10.	"Marceline Pt. 2"			3:01
11.	"Ur Town"			3:41
12.	"Star" (featuring Jabs)	Smith; Bond; Willard Carroll Smith III; Omarr Rambert	Ace; Rambert	3:36
13.	"Wait a Minute!"	Smith; James Chul Rim	James Chul Rim	3:16
14.	"Waves of Nature"	Smith; W. C. Smith	Ace	3:51
15.	"Why Don't You Cry"	Smith; W. C. Smith; Rambert	Ace	3:48
Total length:				54:07

Notes

- "Drugz" is stylized "dRuGz".
- "Randomsong" is stylized in all caps.
- "Ur Town" is stylized "UR Town".

== Personnel ==
- Willow – vocals, production
- Jabs – vocals, production
- AcE – production
- Mel "Chaos" Lewis – production
- James Chul Rim – production, recording, mixing

== Charts ==
Chart (2016)	Peak position
US Heatseekers Albums (Billboard)	15

== Certifications ==
Certifications and sales
Region	Certification	Certified units/sales
New Zealand (RMNZ)	Gold	7,500^{‡}
^{‡} Sales+streaming figures based on certification alone.
