= Fireball (Willow Smith song) =

Single by Willow featuring Nicki Minaj
- Released: October 6, 2011
- Recorded: 2011
- Genre: Electropop; teen pop; hip hop
- Length: 4:08
- Label: Columbia; Roc Nation
- Songwriters: Lazonate Franklin; Onika Maraj; Marc Kinchen; Omarr Rambert
- Producer: Stoopid Boots

Willow Smith singles chronology
"21st Century Girl" (2011)	"Fireball" (2011)	"F Q-C #7" (2015)

Nicki Minaj singles chronology
"Y.U. Mad" (2011)	"Fireball" (2011)	"You the Boss" (2011)

"Fireball" is a song by American singer Willow featuring rapper Nicki Minaj. Produced by Stoopid Boots, it was released on October 6, 2011.

== Background and release ==
The song premiered on October 4, 2011 on Hot 97's Angie Martinez Show. It was released on iTunes two days later and was released to U.S. urban radio on October 18, 2011. In the song, Minaj says: "Ok, I'm the street fighter, call me Chun-Li" making a reference to the character Chun-Li from the video game franchise Street Fighter and for who she ironically released a song of the same name as the character in 2018.

== Live performances ==
Willow performed the song on the U.S. edition of The X-Factor on November 10, 2011.

== Music video ==
The music video for the song was released on December 9, 2011 and features Smith singing the song around the city streets constantly stating that she is the "Fireball" of the party and she is eventually joined by Minaj.

== Charts ==
Chart (2011)	Peak position
Belgium (Ultratip Bubbling Under Flanders)	58

== Awards and nominations ==
The song was nominated for the BTM Award (Best Teen Music) at the MP3 Music Awards in 2012.

Year	Awards Ceremony	Category	Result
2012	MP3 Music Awards	Best Teen Music	Nominated
