= Petal Rock Black =

Studio album by Willow
- Released: February 17, 2026
- Recorded: 2024–2026
- Genres: Jazz fusion; electro-funk; progressive pop; avant-garde
- Length: 26:22
- Labels: Three Six Zero; gamma.
- Producers: Jon Batiste; willow

Willow chronology
Empathogen (2024)	Petal Rock Black (2026)	The Thread (2026)

Petal Rock Black (stylized in all lowercase as petal rock black) is the seventh studio album by American singer-songwriter Willow. It was released as a surprise digital drop on February 17, 2026, through Three Six Zero Recordings. The album has guest appearances from George Clinton, Kamasi Washington and Tune-Yards. Serving as the follow-up to her 2024 jazz-oriented project Empathogen, the record continues her move into experimental jazz fusion and progressive pop.

== Background ==
In early February 2026, Willow began teasing a new project with a stark black-and-white trailer, describing the album as a personal offering that honors the labor of creation and artistic dedication. She officially announced Petal Rock Black on social media, confirming a February 17 release and a 12-track track listing. Willow has stated that she spent around a year and a half developing the album largely in isolation, aiming to see what sounds emerged when she wrote, played and recorded without outside input beyond her engineer.

The project was described in press materials as “a personal offering that honors the labor of creation: of self, of sound, of community” and “a celebration of life, of artistic dedication, and of all those who use their hands to shift culture toward something more beautiful.” It follows the critical success of Empathogen, which peaked at 3 on the US Billboard Top Jazz Albums chart and deepened her association with experimental jazz.

== Composition ==
Petal Rock Black continues Willow’s pivot away from pop‑punk and rock toward a boundary‑pushing fusion of jazz, soul and progressive pop. Critics have noted that the album leans heavily into soulful jazz fusion, featuring complex vocal arrangements, hypnotic lyrical repetition and unconventional textures rather than conventional pop song structures. The record opens with a brief spoken-word piece by George Clinton and incorporates spiritual and quasi-religious imagery that alternates with intimate relationship themes.

Reviewers have also highlighted the interplay between Willow’s guitar work, looping rhythms and intricate rhythm section, drawing comparisons to artists such as Erykah Badu and Tori Amos in its emotive, exploratory performances. Tracks like “Vegetation” and “Play” have been singled out for their precise, funky arrangements and improvisatory feel, while “Omnipotent” showcases Tune-Yards’ experimental sensibility within Willow’s compositional framework.

== Release and promotion ==
The album was surprise-released to streaming services on February 17, 2026, via Three Six Zero Recordings, following a short teaser campaign across Willow’s social media accounts. To celebrate the release, Willow performed two intimate shows at the Blue Note Jazz Club in Hollywood, debuting material from the album with a small band in a jazz-club setting. These performances emphasized the album’s improvisatory jazz fusion character and Willow’s focus on live musicianship.

== Critical reception ==
Professional ratings
Review scores
Source	Rating
Pitchfork	6.0/10
Shatter the Standards	3.5/5 stars

Early reception to Petal Rock Black has emphasized the album’s experimental nature and the strength of Willow’s solo artistic vision. NPR praised the project for its progressive pop sensibility, layered vocals and hypnotic repetition, noting that the collaborations enhance rather than overshadow her authorship. Rolling Stone highlighted the Blue Note release shows as evidence of her continued evolution into a jazz-oriented performer unconcerned with conventional pop expectations. Independent outlets such as Shatter the Standards have discussed the album’s use of spiritual language and its oscillation between devotional and romantic themes, framing it as a cohesive statement of personal exploration.

== Track listing ==
All tracks are written by Willow Smith. Credits and track times are adapted from Apple Music.

No.	Title	Producer(s)	Length
1.	"Petal Rock Black" (featuring George Clinton)		0:30
2.	"Vegetation"	Jon Batiste	2:04
3.	"Hear Me Out"		1:33
4.	"Play" (featuring Kamasi Washington)		2:10
5.	"Sitting Silently"		1:35
6.	"Not a Fantasy"		2:14
7.	"I Would Die 4 U" (cover of the 1984 song by Prince and the Revolution)		1:53
8.	"Omnipotent" (featuring Tune-Yards)		2:56
9.	"Holy Mystery"		3:30
10.	"Nothing and Everything"		2:37
11.	"Living in the Heart Interlude"		0:58
12.	"Ear to the Cocoon"		4:18
Total length:			26:22

=== Notes ===
- All tracks are stylized in lowercase

== Personnel ==
Credits adapted from Tidal.

- Willow – production, recording, programming (all tracks); vocals, backing vocals (tracks 2–12); guitar (2, 3, 5, 10, 11), drums (3, 4, 6–8, 12), organ (3), bass (4–6, 9), piano (4, 5, 8, 12), keyboards (7)
- Adam Schoeller – recording (1, 3–7, 9–12)
- Mitch McCarthy – mixing
- Nathan Dantzler – mastering
- George Clinton – vocals, backing vocals (1)
- Jon Batiste – production, programming (2)
- Kaleb Rollins – recording (2)
- Kamasi Washington – saxophone (4)
- Zach Brown – recording (4, 8)
- Brian Jacobs – recording (5)
- Tune-Yards – vocals, backing vocals, synthesizer (8)

== Charts ==
Chart performance for Petal Rock Black
Chart (2026)	Peak position
Australian Jazz & Blues Albums (ARIA)	6
US Top Jazz Albums (Billboard)	11
US Top Contemporary Jazz Albums (Billboard)	3
