= The 1st (album) =

Studio album by Willow
- Released: October 31, 2017
- Genre: Soul rock; pop
- Length: 34:49
- Label: MSFTSMusic; Roc Nation; Interscope
- Producer: Willow Smith; Dev Hynes

Willow chronology
Ardipithecus (2015)	The 1st (2017)	Willow (2019)

Singles from The 1st
- 1. "Romance" Released: November 13, 2017

The 1st is the second studio album by American singer Willow. It was released on October 31, 2017, through MSFTSMusic, Roc Nation and Interscope Records. It was written and produced entirely by Willow.

== Background ==
The album was released on Willow's 17th birthday, noting that the making of this album was putting her in uncomfortable positions, and is much more raw and organic. Her vocal performances were inspired by Alanis Morissette and Tori Amos.

== Critical reception ==
Professional ratings
Review scores
Source	Rating
AllMusic	4/5 stars
Pitchfork	6.7/10

The 1st received a favorable review from Cameron Cook of Pitchfork. Cook gave the album a 6.7 and noted that the "more organic and raw" sound on the album was a "huge leap in the right direction".

== Track listing ==
All tracks written and produced by Willow Smith, except where noted.

No.	Title	Writer(s)	Producer(s)	Length
1.	"Boy"			3:01
2.	"An Awkward Life of an Awkward Girl"			1:45
3.	"And Contentment"			3:34
4.	"Ho' ihi Interlude"			2:55
5.	"Israel"			3:36
6.	"Oh No!!!"	Smith; Devonte Hynes	Smith; Hynes	3:11
7.	"Warm Honey"			2:55
8.	"Human Leech"			2:43
9.	"Lonely Road"	Smith; Chloe Bailey; Halle Bailey		2:39
10.	"A Reason"			4:16
11.	"Romance"			4:14
Total length:				34:49

== Personnel ==
- Willow – vocals, production
- Devonte Hynes – vocals, production (track 6)
- Chloe Bailey – vocals (track 9)
- Halle Bailey – vocals (track 9)
- James Chul Rim – mixing
