= The Anxiety =

Studio album by the Anxiety
- Released: March 13, 2020
- Genre: Punk rock; indie rock; alternative rock; dream pop; progressive rock
- Length: 28:08
- Label: MSFTS; Roc Nation

Willow Smith chronology
Willow (2019)	The Anxiety (2020)	Lately I Feel Everything (2021)

Tyler Cole chronology
We're in Love & the World is Ending (2017)	The Anxiety (2020)	Just Different (2020)

Singles from The Anxiety
- 1. "Hey You!" Released: February 28, 2020; 2. "Meet Me at Our Spot" Released: October 5, 2021

The Anxiety is a collaborative studio album by American musicians Willow Smith and Tyler Cole under the band name the Anxiety. The project was released by the duo on March 13, 2020, by MSFTSMusic and Roc Nation. While the album did not chart at the time of its release, it entered charts in late 2021 after album track "Meet Me at Our Spot" became a sleeper hit on TikTok. It became Cole's first ever charting album and Willow's first charting album in Canada.

== Background ==
Willow Smith and Tyler Cole have been romantic partners and artistic collaborators for several years. Prior to The Anxiety, Cole co-produced her 2019 self-titled album. The band released their debut single "Hey You!" on February 28, 2020.

== Art exhibit ==
In promotion of the project, Smith and Cole staged a performance art piece at the Museum of Contemporary Art, Los Angeles on March 11, 2020, wherein the duo were locked in a glass box for 24 hours and were not allowed to speak to each other. One wall was clear for the audience to view, with the other three covered in canvas for the duo to write affirmations on. The performance is meant to convey the eight stages of anxiety (paranoia, rage, sadness, numbness, euphoria, strong interest, compassion and acceptance) with each stage lasting three hours. The performance was seen as topical due to it occurring just days before COVID-19 lockdowns in the United States.

== Composition ==
The Anxiety is a punk, indie rock, alternative rock, dream pop, and progressive rock album. The album's first half largely consists of "uptempo rhythms and punchy riffs", dabbles in lo-fi around the middle, and the second half contains "pensive R&B and drone-like ballads". Lyrically, the album tackles themes of anxiety, rage, panic attacks, and government corruption.

== Track listing ==
All tracks are written by and produced by Tyler Cole and Willow Smith.

The Anxiety track listing
No.	Title	Length
1.	"Hey You!"	2:25
2.	"Fight Club"	2:24
3.	"Believe That"	2:53
4.	"Poolside"	3:44
5.	"Interlude"	1:03
6.	"Entertain"	2:56
7.	"Are You Afraid"	2:01
8.	"Meet Me at Our Spot"	2:42
9.	"The System"	4:27
10.	"After You Cry"	3:33
Total length:		28:08

Notes

- ^{^a} signifies a co-producer

== Charts ==
=== Weekly charts ===
Weekly chart performance for The Anxiety
Chart (2021)	Peak position
Canadian Albums (Billboard)	77
US Billboard 200	103
US Top Alternative Albums (Billboard)	11
US Heatseekers Albums (Billboard)	7
US Independent Albums (Billboard)	13
US Top Rock Albums (Billboard)	17

=== Year-end charts ===
Year-end chart performance for The Anxiety
Chart (2021)	Peak position
US Top Alternative Albums (Billboard)	37
US Top Rock Albums (Billboard)	70

== Certifications ==
Certifications and sales
Region	Certification	Certified units/sales
New Zealand (RMNZ)	Gold	7,500^{‡}
^{‡} Sales+streaming figures based on certification alone.
