= Wait a Minute! =

Single by Willow

from the album Ardipithecus
- Released: December 11, 2015
- Genre: Alternative R&B; experimental pop
- Length: 3:16
- Label: Roc Nation; Interscope
- Songwriters: James Chul Rim; Willow
- Producer: James Chul Rim

Willow singles chronology
"Why Don't You Cry" (2015)	"Wait a Minute!" (2015)	"Romance" (2017)

"Wait a Minute!" is a song by American singer-songwriter Willow, released simultaneously as the second and final single of her debut album Ardipithecus by Roc Nation and Interscope Records on December 11, 2015. The song was written by Willow alongside producer James Chul Rim.

== Commercial performance ==
"Wait a Minute!" saw little success upon release in 2015. It was not until four years later that it started to gain traction. In the spring of 2019, the track inspired the #HereRightNow dance challenge on the social media platform TikTok, where it went viral, becoming a sleeper hit.

In the spring of 2022, the track experienced another resurgence in popularity after a sped-up remix went viral on TikTok, reaching the Top 40 in countries including Australia, New Zealand, and the Netherlands.

== Charts ==
=== Weekly charts ===
Weekly chart performance for "Wait a Minute!"
Chart (2020–2022)	Peak position
Australia (ARIA)	25
Belgium (Ultratip Bubbling Under Flanders)	23
France (SNEP)	198
Global 200 (Billboard)	43
Greece International (IFPI)	51
Ireland (IRMA)	75
Lithuania (AGATA)	19
Netherlands (Single Tip)	14
New Zealand (Recorded Music NZ)	24
Portugal (AFP)	81
South Africa Streaming (TOSAC)	57
Sweden Heatseeker (Sverigetopplistan)	11
Switzerland (Schweizer Hitparade)	85
UK Hip Hop/R&B (OCC)	21
US Alternative Digital Song Sales (Billboard)	6
US Alternative Streaming Songs (Billboard)	5

=== Year-end charts ===
2022 year-end chart performance for "Wait a Minute!"
Chart (2022)	Position
Australia (ARIA)	82
Global 200 (Billboard)	195

== Certifications ==
Certifications for "Wait a Minute!"
Region	Certification	Certified units/sales
Australia (ARIA)	3× Platinum	210,000^{‡}
Brazil (Pro-Música Brasil)	3× Platinum	180,000^{‡}
Denmark (IFPI Danmark)	Gold	45,000^{‡}
Italy (FIMI)	Gold	50,000^{‡}
New Zealand (RMNZ)	4× Platinum	120,000^{‡}
Poland (ZPAV)	Platinum	50,000^{‡}
Portugal (AFP)	Gold	10,000^{‡}
United Kingdom (BPI)	Platinum	600,000^{‡}
United States (RIAA)	2× Platinum	2,000,000^{‡}
^{‡} Sales+streaming figures based on certification alone.
