= Whip My Hair =

Single by Willow
- Released: October 26, 2010
- Studio: Calabasas, California
- Genre: R&B; hip hop
- Length: 3:16
- Label: Roc Nation; Columbia
- Songwriters: Ronald Jackson; Janae Ratliff
- Producers: Jukebox & Obanga; Tim Carter

Willow singles chronology
"Whip My Hair" (2010)	"21st Century Girl" (2011)

"Whip My Hair" is the debut single by American singer-songwriter Willow Smith, released 5 days before her 10th birthday, under the name Willow. The song was written by Ronald "Jukebox" Jackson and Janae Liann Ratliff, and produced by Jackson. "Whip My Hair" peaked at number 11 on the Billboard Hot 100. Outside of the United States, "Whip My Hair" peaked within the top ten of the charts in Belgium (Wallonia), Denmark, and the United Kingdom, and peaked within the top 20 of the charts in Australia, Canada, and Ireland.

== Background ==
In the summer of 2010, Willow's mother, Jada Pinkett Smith, revealed on Lopez Tonight that her daughter was recording an album. On September 27, 2010, Willow's single was leaked onto the Internet. Time magazine, CNN, and Billboard each featured the song the evening it surfaced. Several celebrities applauded the new single on Twitter, including Ciara, Brandy, Solange Knowles, Britney Spears, and Alfredo Flores.

== Composition ==
"...it means just be an individual. Like, you can't be afraid to be yourself, you have to be yourself, and you can't let anyone tell you that that's wrong."

— Willow on the lyrics of "Whip My Hair"

Lyrically the song is about letting loose, being as wild as can be, while she asks ladies to "whip their hair" and "shake haters off". The lyrics have motivational undertones, speaking of self-love and assurance, and referring to letting your hair down as a representation of this in parts like the line, "Keep fighting until I get there, when I'm down and I feel like giving up/I whip my hair back and forth, I whip it, I whip it real good."

"Whip My Hair"
A sample of the song, featuring the line, "Don't let haters keep me off my grind."

"Whip My Hair" is a high-tempo R&B and hip-hop piece, that incorporates dance-pop and crunk, with funk and disco influences. The song is said to be composed in an "eclectic" style, and makes use of heavy synthesizers and drums. Willow's vocals are auto-tuned in some parts, while containing keyboard washes over a drum-heavy beat described as "propulsive" and "futuristic". The song features a knocking beat, including the vocal refrain of "I whip my hair back and forth". Some critics have deemed the song too similar to Willow's musical influence Rihanna. Additionally, others said the song was similar to the style of Rihanna contemporaries Ciara and Keri Hilson, with a hip-hop feel similar to Lil Mama. Gina Serpe of E! Online called the track a fourth-grade version of Rihanna and Hilson.

== Critical reception ==
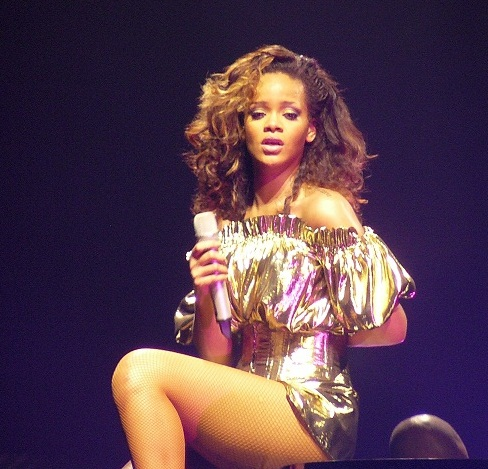
According to critics, the song took influence from a number of other artists, namely Rihanna (pictured). Comparisons to Rihanna earned Willow the nickname "Baby Rihanna" after the song's leak.

Critics noted the song's universal appeal, with Gerrick Kennedy of The Los Angeles Times calling the song radio, club, and recess-friendly, and Daniela Capistrano of MTV News calling it a "kid-friendly club banger". Kennedy commented, "don't let her age fool you; the song packs serious punch." Capistrano said that the song's "crazy" beat works on the schoolyard and dancefloor. Commenting that the song was age-appropriate, Gina Serpe of E! Online said, that accomplishment was commendable, stating, "it's got to be a bit of a battle finding material suitable for someone still in the single-digits." Tim Stack of Entertainment Weekly commended the song, complimenting the production value, stating the song was "Lil Mama meets Rihanna". CBC said while the song may not be deep, it was the best to be expected from a "fourth grade fashionista", commenting the track was more "schoolyard friendly" than any music released by Miley Cyrus. The Guardian described the track as "a pretty good R&B belter in the same vein as Rihanna, all heavily treated vocals and huge juddering beats". BET Sound Off blog commented that Willow had more personality on the track than fellow artists three times her age. Melinda Newman of HitFix complimented Willow's "competent" singing voice.

== Chart performance ==
Prior to its appearance on radio, the song received recognition on the US Rap Songs chart. On the week ending September 25, 2010 the song debuted at number 60 on the US Hot R&B/Hip-Hop Songs, jumping to number 38 in the following week. The song peaked at number 5 on the charts. "Whip My Hair" debuted at number 78 on the Billboard Hot 100 the week of October 28, 2010 and moved up to number 11 the next week. It sold over 1,216,000 digital copies in the US. On December 8, 2010, "Whip My Hair" debuted on the UK Midweeks at number 1, but on December 12, 2010, it was beaten to the top by The Black Eyed Peas with "The Time (Dirty Bit)".

== Music video ==
=== Background and release ===
Willow filmed the song's accompanying music video in Los Angeles the week of September 20, 2010. Ray Kay, known for Lady Gaga's "Poker Face" and Justin Bieber's "Baby", directed the clip. In an interview with Rap-Up, Kay said "I'm certain people that are watching the video will feel inspired to develop their own individuality and freedom and express their own art after seeing Willow in this video." Kay also confirmed that the shooting would take two days, and require a lot from Willow, although the director was confident that Willow would "kill it" in front of the camera. Later, Kay commented to Rap-Up in a separate piece, "I think this video will be considered iconic in the future. Willow is definitely here to stay, she's a superstar. I think we managed to create a fresh expression using Willow's amazing energy, a positive and inspiring concept, and mixing the colors of the sets with Willow's fashion, which consisted of custom-made clothing and exclusive One Z jumpsuits. She's a trendsetter already and I'm sure others will be copying her style soon!"

A teaser video released on September 16, 2010 received 1.2 million views prior to the release of the official music video. The video premiered on October 18, 2010, with Vevo hosting its online premiere, and the song featured during Willow's appearance on 106 & Park. Before the video received its official premieres, it was leaked online, though RocNation removed all unauthorized clips. A day after release, the video had reportedly garnered over 100,000 views on YouTube.

=== Synopsis ===
The video begins in a futuristic cafeteria with kids, dubbed the "Warriorettes", sitting down at grey tables in white clothing. Willow enters the room in colorful attire (including a blue vest, orange pants and a belt with her name on it, rhinestones on her lips and extravagant nail tips). With her braids shaped to form a heart, she turns on a boombox which is filled with paint, while undoing her braids and dipping them into paint inside the stereo. She uses her hair as a paintbrush, bringing colour to the drab room. Willow begins dancing and the other children join her, which is intercut with the singer donning a colourful mohawk and performing choreography with dancers with blue shirts in front of a light blue backdrop. She alternates different hairstyles, walking down a hallway with her backup dancers. Willow 'whips' her hair to give colour to the lockers and the students' attire, before performing choreography with the hallway students. Midway, Willow and her dancers perform a dance routine with music not in the original song. The last scenes shows Willow, wearing puff braids and a yellow jumpsuit, trying to get her backup singers to dance in a classroom, which is intercut with more paint-splashing scenes as the dancers, including her brother Jaden and actor Cameron Boyce, teachers, the janitor, an elderly lady, and a toddler dance. A writer for Rap-Up said that Willow "is in a class of her own in the breakout video for her empowering anthem", calling the video "the birth of more B.S.".

=== Reception ===
Natalie Finn of E! Online commended the video for being "sassy, yet kid friendly". Carina Adly MacKenzie of Zap2it said while the song took everyone by surprise, that the video was "even more awesome", commenting, "we probably shouldn't be shocked that Willow has more charisma in her pinky finger than half the artists twice her age." Ryan Brockington of The New York Post reviewed the video positively, stating that "director Ray Kay kept it very young and colorful, the complete opposite of the very grown up sounding track."

A writer for Idolator said that Willow, in the video, "has transcended from Jada and Will Smith's 9-year-old kiddo to a legitimate star", noting, "the killer outfits, fun classroom dance pieces and, yes, tons of hair whipping -- with paint!" A Celebuzz writer said that Willow "kills it with some seriously fierce bling, dance moves and, of course, intense hair whipping". Melinda Newman of HitFix commented, "As Miley Cyrus gets ready to become an adult, we can fill that spot with Willow", complimenting her charisma and her "full-blown teen" attitude.

Matt Cherrete and Chris Ryan of MTV Buzzworthy said the video lived up to the "energy" and "power" of the track, commenting that it contained the "most inspiring and awesome youth power dancing, hair whipping and floor stomping that you're going to see all day". Matt Donnelly of The Los Angeles Times said that with the release, the singer "introduces to us a pre-preteen firecracker who lives up to her impeccable breeding and perhaps takes the legacy one step further". Admitting she originally dismissed the song and video, due to Willow's quick rise to fame and the oversexualized nature of pop music, Leah Greenblatt of Entertainment Weekly commented: "this clip is about to put a boom in the chiropracting industry (with possible ancillary benefits for housepaint), because girl can snap it." Billy Johnson Jr. of Yahoo! Music said that "among the many dancers in the clip", Willow "shines as the clear breakout star", calling the video a "smash", and commented that "she pulls it off without need for cameo appearances from her famous parents." Veronica Miller of NPR said that it wasn't the hairstyles that made the clip, but "the sheer fearlessness with which young Willow is singing, dancing and whipping", stating she has "just enough sass and pluck and confidence to hold our attention and leave us wanting more". The video was nominated for "Video of the Year" and "Outstanding Music Video" at the 2011 BET Awards and NAACP Image Awards respectively.

== Live performances ==
Willow performed the song for the first time live on November 2, 2010 on The Ellen DeGeneres Show, followed by performances on December 6, 2010 at the LA Live Tree Lighting, and on December 31, 2010 at Dick Clark's New Year's Rockin' Eve with Ryan Seacrest. The following year, Willow performed the song on March 1 on The Oprah Winfrey Show, and on April 2 at the 2011 Kids Choice Awards and on April 25, 2011 at the 2011 White House Easter Egg Roll. She also performed the song as an opening act on the United Kingdom leg of Justin Bieber's My World Tour.

In 2021, Willow debuted a punk version of the song, and had her head shaved while performing it live on stage.

== Cultural impact ==
In September 2010, a fan-made mash-up of the video and a Sesame Street segment appeared online. The original Sesame Street clip featured a puppet portrayed as a young black girl proud of her hair. She flails her braids, cornrows, afro, and other Black hairstyles. According to the show's writer, Joey Mazzarino, the song was a tribute to his Ethiopian daughter's hair, writing it, stating that he wanted to say, "Your hair is great. You can put it in ponytails. You can put it in cornrows. I wish I had hair like you." The mash-up uses different shots in the show's segment paired with "Whip My Hair" to act as a music video. During the week of release of the "Whip My Hair" video, the Sesame Street clip also went viral.

Veronica Miller of NPR commented that through both clips, "little black girls [were] having the best week ever", noting the rarity that "little African-American girls are publicly celebrated for their uniqueness and beauty", due to non-positive comments about their physical appearance, making them question individual and collective beauty. On the single's video, Miller said, "Little Willow is operating with a sort of empowerment that grown women can sense, admire, and in some cases, envy", stating, "not many girls are taught that it's OK to openly love and affirm yourself." Noting that the norm is not to be "sassy" or "cute", she said that "Whip My Hair" is "a celebration of little girls celebrating themselves".

In 2013, the song was used as a "lip-sync for your life" song on the fifth season of RuPaul's Drag Race, during the seventh episode "RuPaul Roast". Contestants Alyssa Edwards and Roxxxy Andrews were in the bottom two after failing the challenge. After a double wig trick from Andrews, an energetic performance from Edwards and an emotional breakdown from Andrews, both contestants were saved from elimination. RuPaul has gone on to say that this performance was his favorite lip-sync ever.

== Track listing ==
- Digital download
1. "Whip My Hair" – 3:16
2. "Whip My Hair" (Remix) ft. Nicki Minaj – 3:27
- UK digital download
1. "Whip My Hair" – 3:13
2. "Whip My Hair" (music video) – 3:54
- EP – digital download
1. "Whip My Hair" – 3:13
2. "Whip My Hair" (Warriorettes Mix) – 3:17
3. "Whip My Hair" (music video) – 3:54
- German CD single
1. "Whip My Hair" (album version) – 3:13
2. "Whip My Hair" (Warriorettes Mix) – 3:17

== Charts and certifications ==
=== Weekly charts ===
Chart (2010–2011)	Peak position
Australia (ARIA)	18
Austria (Ö3 Austria Top 40)	69
Belgium (Ultratop 50 Flanders)	28
Belgium (Ultratip Bubbling Under Wallonia)	5
Brazil (Billboard Hot 100)	99
Canada Hot 100 (Billboard)	18
Denmark (Tracklisten)	9
Germany (GfK)	44
Ireland (IRMA)	11
Netherlands (Single Top 100)	83
New Zealand (Recorded Music NZ)	35
Romania (UPFR)	48
Scottish Singles Sales (Official Charts)	2
Slovakia Airplay (ČNS IFPI)	50
UK Singles (Official Charts)	2
UK Hip Hop/R&B (Official Charts)	1
US Billboard Hot 100	11
US Hot R&B/Hip-Hop Songs (Billboard)	5
US Pop Airplay (Billboard)	28

=== Year-end charts ===
Chart (2010)	Rank
Australia Urban (ARIA)	37
UK Singles (Official Charts Company)	114
US Hot R&B/Hip-Hop Songs (Billboard)	84

Chart (2011)	Rank
Brazil (Crowley)	88
UK Singles (Official Charts Company)	186
US Hot R&B/Hip-Hop Songs (Billboard)	76

=== Certifications ===
Certifications for Whip My Hair
Region	Certification	Certified units/sales
Australia (ARIA)	Platinum	70,000^{^}
Canada (Music Canada)	Gold	40,000^{*}
United Kingdom (BPI)	Gold	400,000^{‡}
United States (RIAA)	3× Platinum	3,000,000^{‡}
^{*} Sales figures based on certification alone.^{^} Shipments figures based on certification alone.^{‡} Sales+streaming figures based on certification alone.

== Release history ==
Region	Date	Format
United States	September 21, 2010	Urban airplay
United States	October 12, 2010	Mainstream airplay
United States	October 26, 2010	Digital download
United Kingdom	December 5, 2010	Digital download
United Kingdom	December 6, 2010	CD single
Germany	January 14, 2011	CD single
