= Oberhofer =

American indie rock band

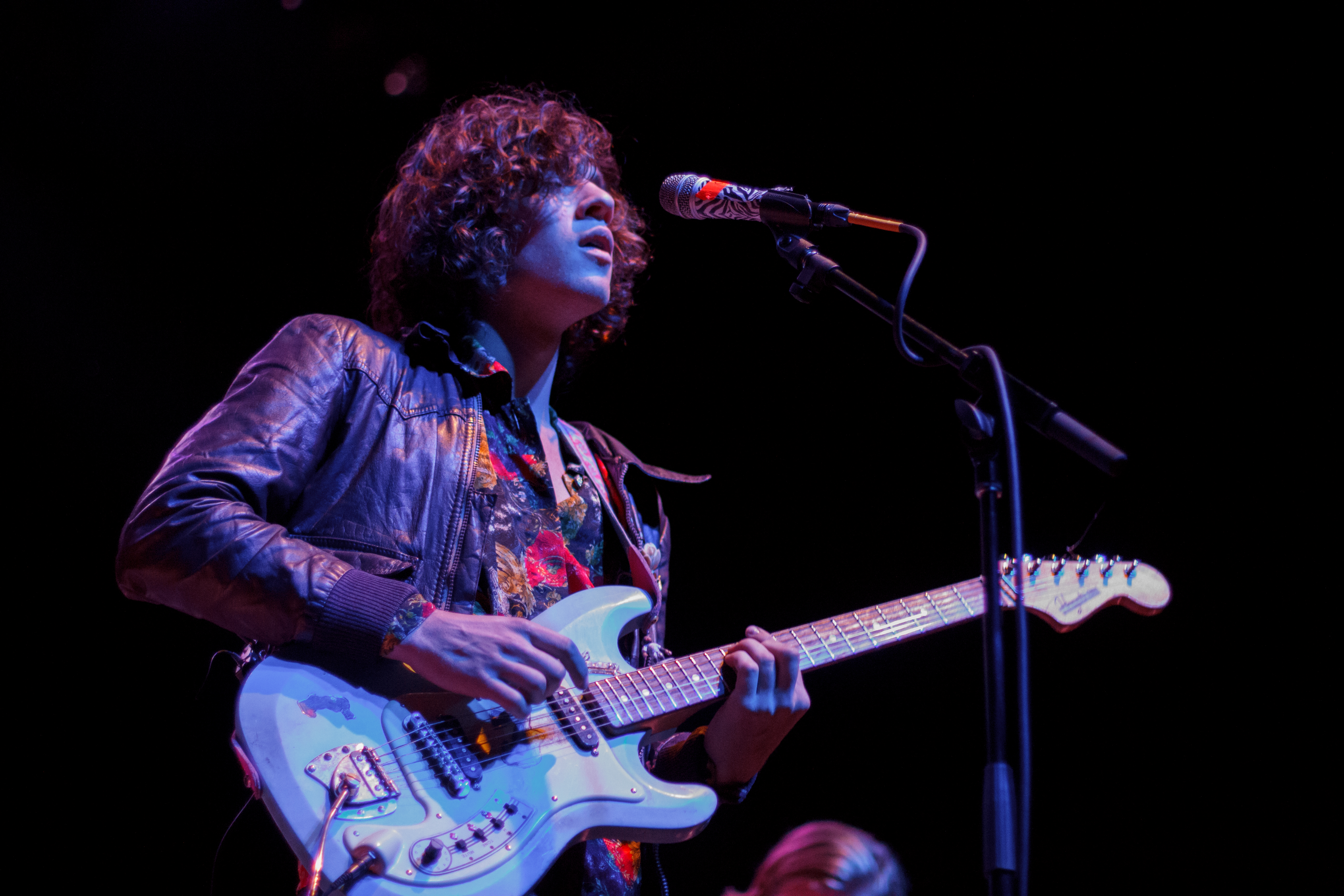

Background information
- Origin: Brooklyn, New York, U.S.
- Genres: Indie pop
- Years active: 2008–present
- Labels: Inflated, White Iris Records, Glassnote Records,
- Members: Brad Oberhofer; Zöe Brecher; Ben Roth; Dylan Treleven
- Website: Facebook page

Oberhofer is a band from Brooklyn, New York City, formed in 2008 to perform the music of its founder and frontman Brad Oberhofer. Current members are Brad Oberhofer on synths, guitar and vocals, Zöe Brecher on drums, Dylan Treleven on bass, and Ben Roth on guitar.

In July 2011, Brad Oberhofer signed with Glassnote Records, which released Oberhofer's debut album, Time Capsules II, on March 27, 2012, an EP entitled Notalgia (2013), and their second album, Chronovision (2015), in the United States and worldwide.

== History ==
Oberhofer started in 2008 as the recording project of Brad Oberhofer. After moving from his native Tacoma, Washington to New York City, Oberhofer attended New York University to study music composition. After using several different names, the young singer adopted his own name as the title of the project. Although the band has since gone through various lineup formations, the name has remained the same because Oberhofer writes all the music himself.

In 2010, Oberhofer self-released his first single, "o0Oo0O0o", and was soon asked to go on tour with bands like Sleigh Bells, Neon Indian, and Matt and Kim. After hitting the road for a year, Oberhofer released "Away Frm U" [sic] and "I Could Go" in 2011. The two singles brought the attention of independent label White Iris Records, who released the band's next single, "Gotta Go/Mahwun", in the summer of 2011. Soon after, Oberhofer signed with Glassnote Records to release their debut album. Stereogum ranked the band as the 39th most anticipated album of 2012.

Brad Oberhofer began work on Time Capsules II in the studio with Grammy Award–winning producer Steve Lillywhite in November 2011, recording vocals and most instrumental tracks himself, and pulling in bandmates and other instrumentalists to complete certain tracks. Glassnote released Time Capsules II in the United States on March 27, 2012. In anticipation of the release, the band performed "Away Frm U" on the Late Show with David Letterman.

Oberhofer performed widely in clubs and on the festival circuit in support of Time Capsules II. Notable performances include in the Mojave Tent at the 2012 edition of the Coachella Valley Music and Arts Festival and the Budweiser stage at Lollapalooza in Chicago on August 5, 2012. They performed at the Austin City Limits Music Festival on October 13, 2013.

Their song "I Could Go" was included as a sound track of the freeride biking movie Where The Trail Ends, sponsored by brands such as Specialized Bicycle Components, Red Bull and others. Many of their other songs have been licensed to television programs, advertisements, and online series, including Catfish: The TV Show, Skins, LUV, T-Mobile, SoBe, BoJack Horseman, Kevin from Work, Underemployed, Teen Wolf, and Table 19.

Their song "Gold" also was included as a sound track of the soccer simulation game by Konami, Pro Evolution Soccer 2013. In 2016, their song "Sea of Dreams" from Chronovision was prominently featured in the fourth episode of season 3 of Netflix's animated TV series BoJack Horseman, "Fish Out of Water", which was voted Time Magazine's best episode of television in 2016.

== Discography ==
=== Albums ===
- Time Capsules II (Glassnote Records, 2012)
- Chronovision (Glassnote Records, 2015)
- Table 19 (Motion Picture Soundtrack): Oberhofer's Ultimate Wedding Mixtape (Glassnote Records, 2017)
- Smothered (Telefono, 2021)
- The Andy Warhol Diaries OST (Netflix, 2022)

=== EPs ===
- Notalgia EP (Glassnote Records, 2013)
- o000o000o EP (Glassnote Records, 2009)

=== Singles ===
Single	Video	Label/year
o0Oo0Oo0	No	Self-released, 2010
Away Frm U	Yes	Inflated Records, 2011
I Could Go	No	Self-released, 2011
Gotta Go/Mahwun	No	White Iris Records, 2011
Dead girls dance	No	Self-released, 2009
Haus	No	Self-released, 2012
Cruisin' FDR	Yes	2012
Earplugs	No	Glassnote Records, 2013
You + Me (Still Together In The Future)	No	Glassnote Records, 2013
Together/Never	Yes	Glassnote Records 2013
Memory Remains	Yes	Glassnote Records 2015
White Horse, Black River	No	Glassnote Records 2015
Sun Halo	No	Glassnote Records 2015
Dreamt I Was Gonna Be Your Man	Yes	Glassnote Records 2018
