= Willow Smith =

American musician (born 2000)

Willow
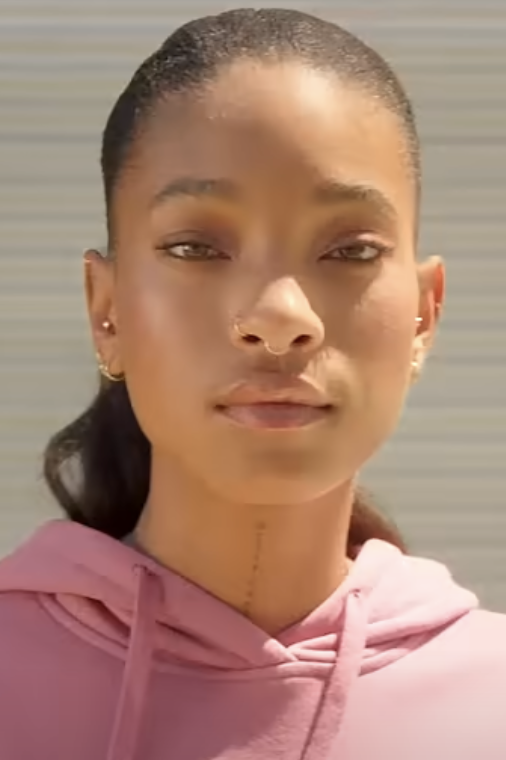
- Smith in 2024
- Born: Willow Camille Reign Smith; October 31, 2000 (age 26); Los Angeles, California, U.S.
- Occupations: Musician; singer; songwriter; actress
- Years active: 2010–present
- Works: Discography
- Parents: Will Smith (father); Jada Pinkett Smith (mother)
- Relatives: Jaden Smith (brother)
- Musical career
- Genres: Art pop; alternative rock; jazz; R&B; funk
- Labels: Roc Nation; Columbia; Interscope; Polydor; Gamma; Three Six Zero
- Website: willowsmith.com

Willow Camille Reign Smith (born October 31, 2000), known mononymously as Willow, is an American musician and actress. After early beginnings as a child actress, she signed with Jay-Z's Roc Nation in 2010, becoming the label's youngest artist. Her debut single "Whip My Hair" peaked at number 11 on the Billboard Hot 100 and was certified 3× platinum by the RIAA. Her subsequent singles "Wait a Minute!", "Meet Me at Our Spot", and "Transparent Soul" were also certified platinum or higher by the RIAA.

Willow has released eight albums as a solo artist and one album as half of the Anxiety alongside fellow musician Tyler Cole. Her music incorporates elements of art pop, alternative rock, jazz, R&B, and funk, with her later work increasingly characterized by experimental and genre-crossing approaches. Her albums Lately I Feel Everything (2021), Coping Mechanism (2022), and Empathogen (2024) received critical praise, with the latter earning two Grammy Award nominations.

Willow has also been nominated for two Emmy Awards and three MTV Video Music Awards. She has toured internationally as a support act for Childish Gambino (2024) and Coldplay (2025). From 2018 to 2023, she co-hosted the Facebook Watch series Red Table Talk with her mother Jada Pinkett Smith and grandmother Adrienne Banfield-Norris. The series received twelve Daytime Emmy Award nominations during its run, winning for Outstanding Talk Show, Informative in 2021.

== Early life ==
Willow Camille Reign Smith was born on October 31, 2000, in Los Angeles, California, to Will Smith and Jada Pinkett Smith. Her elder brothers are actor-musicians Trey Smith (b. 1992) and Jaden Smith (b. 1998). As children, Smith and her siblings served as youth ambassadors for Project Zambia, a humanitarian initiative established in conjunction with Hasbro to provide assistance to Zambian children orphaned by HIV/AIDS. She attended Sierra Canyon School in Los Angeles.

== Career ==
=== Child acting ===
Smith began her career as a child actress, making her feature film debut alongside her father, Will Smith, in I Am Legend (2007). She subsequently appeared in Kit Kittredge: An American Girl (2008) and voiced young Gloria in Madagascar: Escape 2 Africa (2008), alongside her mother, Jada Pinkett Smith. From 2009 to 2010, she appeared as the younger version of Keke Palmer's titular character in the Nickelodeon sitcom True Jackson, VP. Smith subsequently shifted her focus from acting to releasing music under the mononym Willow.

=== Music ===
==== 2010–2013: Whip My Hair and early releases ====
In 2010, Willow signed with Jay-Z's Roc Nation in 2010, becoming the label's youngest artist. She released her debut single, "Whip My Hair," later that year. The song became an international commercial success, reaching number 11 on the Billboard Hot 100 in the United States and number two in the United Kingdom's Official Charts. The song's accompanying music video was nominated for Video of the Year at the 11th BET Awards. She followed it with "21st Century Girl" in 2011. That year, she also released "Fireball", a collaboration with rapper Nicki Minaj. Her planned debut album, Knees and Elbows, was repeatedly delayed and ultimately unreleased. In 2013, Willow formed the duo Melodic Chaotic with DJ Fabrega. The pair released "The Intro" and "Summer Fling", the latter of which marked her departure from commercial pop music.

==== 2014–2020: Experimental music and Ardipithecus, The 1st, and Willow ====
Willow increasingly moved away from mainstream pop during the mid-2010s, releasing music independently and experimenting with R&B and alternative influences. In 2014, she released her debut EP, 3, followed by singles including "F Q-C #7" in 2015. Her debut album, Ardipithecus, was released on December 11, 2015, through Roc Nation and Interscope Records. Willow explained that the album's title referred to the scientific name of early hominid fossils and reflected what she described as a period of personal and artistic transition. The album included the song "Wait a Minute!", which subsequently became a sleeper hit after going viral on TikTok in 2019 and again in 2022. The song was certified 2× platinum by the RIAA and reached the top 40 in the United States, United Kingdom, Australia, New Zealand, and the Netherlands.

On October 31, 2017, Willow released her second album, The 1st, which drew heavy inspiration from 1990s R&B. She subsequently toured as a supporting act on Jhené Aiko's Trip tour alongside St. Beauty, Kodie Shane, and Kitty Cash. In 2019, Willow released her third album, Willow, which she co-produced with Tyler Cole, drawing from elements of dream pop and psychedelic soul. The pair subsequently released the collaborative album The Anxiety in 2020. The album produced the sleeper hit "Meet Me at Our Spot", which went viral on TikTok in 2021. The song reached number 21 on the US Billboard Hot 100, becoming Willow's highest-charting entry since "Whip My Hair" (2010) and her second top-40 hit on the chart. It also reached the top 10 in Australia, Ireland, New Zealand, and the United Kingdom. Later that year, Willow released R I S E, a six-track EP made in collaboration with British mantra singer and violinist Jahnavi Harrison.

==== 2021–2022: Pop-punk and Lately I Feel Everything and Coping Mechanism ====
In 2021, Willow underwent a major musical shift toward pop-punk, drawing on the genre's history and its influence on her own musical upbringing. She released the single "Transparent Soul", featuring Travis Barker, in April, which was later certified platinum by the RIAA. She released her fourth album, Lately I Feel Everything, on July 16, 2021, featuring artists including Tierra Whack and Avril Lavigne. The album received widespread critical acclaim and appeared on numerous year-end "Best of 2021" lists, including those published by Billboard, NPR Music, The Independent, Dazed, Complex, Dork, Kerrang!, The Line of Best Fit, Okayplayer, and Good Morning America. Later that year, Time named Willow one of the 100 most influential people in the world, while Billboard named her its Comeback Artist of the Year as part of its Greatest Pop Stars of 2021 series. In 2022, Willow released her fifth album, Coping Mechanism, through Roc Nation. The album continued her exploration of pop-punk and heavier rock influences and received an aggregated score of 82 out of 100 on Metacritic, earning its "Universal Acclaim" classification. It was included on multiple year-end "Best of 2022" lists, including those published by Rolling Stone, Esquire, Alternative Press, Kerrang!, and Good Morning America. She performed the singles "Curious/Furious" and "Ur a Stranger" as the musical guest on Saturday Night Live in October 2022.

==== 2023–present: Empathogen, Petal Rock Black, and The Thread ====
Willow's music subsequently moved away from the predominantly pop-punk sound of her previous two albums, incorporating elements of art pop, jazz fusion, funk, and other experimental styles. After departing from Roc Nation, Willow signed a multi-project deal with Three Six Zero and Gamma. She released the single "Symptom of Life" in March 2024 and announced her sixth album, Empathogen, the following month. Released on May 3, 2024, the album incorporated jazz, funk, Indian and experimental influences and marked a departure from the punk and metal influences of her previous work. Willow also performed on the NPR Tiny Desk Concert series in May 2024. A deluxe edition, Ceremonial Contrafact, was released on September 27, 2024, with three additional tracks. The album received two nominations at the 67th Annual Grammy Awards in 2025: Best Arrangement, Instruments and Vocals and Best Engineered Album, Non-Classical. On February 17, 2026, Willow released her seventh album, Petal Rock Black. The album continued her exploration of jazz and experimental music. On July 24, 2026, Willow released her eighth album, The Thread. She described the album as "devotional", and it explores themes of spirituality and the divine feminine. The album continued Willow's synthesis of punk, jazz, R&B, and experimental music, with critics praising its experimentation, vocal performances, and greater musical cohesion.

=== Other ventures ===
From 2018 to 2023, Smith co-hosted the Facebook Watch series Red Table Talk with her mother, Jada Pinkett Smith, and grandmother, Adrienne Banfield-Norris. The series received a Daytime Emmy Award nomination in 2020 and won the Daytime Emmy Award for Outstanding Talk Show Informative in 2021.

In February 2022, a preview of Smith's forthcoming historical fantasy novel Black Shield Maiden, co-written with Jess Hendel, was shared on social media and drew widespread criticism over its harmful depiction of the Amazigh people of North Africa. The novel was subsequently revised and published by Penguin Random House on May 7, 2024. Black Shield Maiden received positive reviews from Publishers Weekly, which described the novel as well-researched and praised its representation in the Viking fantasy genre. Following its publication, Smith and Hendel discussed plans for two sequels to complete a trilogy of books.

== Personal life ==
In early May 2014, Moisés Arias, who was 20, was photographed shirtless sitting on a bed with 13-year-old Smith, who was clothed. The photo triggered an investigation into the Smith family by the Los Angeles County Department of Children and Family Services. The family was cleared.

In June 2019, Smith revealed that she is bisexual, stating: "I love men and women equally". She also mentioned her support of polyamorous relationships and her desire to be in one. She is a practicing Hindu and has been actively seen following ISKCON, which follows the doctrine of Gaudiya Vaishnavism with a tradition which believes Krishna is the Supreme Lord.

== Discography ==
Solo albums

- Ardipithecus (2015)
- The 1st (2017)
- Willow (2019)
- Lately I Feel Everything (2021)
- Coping Mechanism (2022)
- Empathogen (2024)
- Petal Rock Black (2026)
- The Thread (2026)

Collaborative albums

- The Anxiety (2020) (with Tyler Cole)

== Filmography ==
=== Film ===
Year	Title	Role	Notes	Ref.
2007	I Am Legend	Marley Neville		
2008	Kit Kittredge: An American Girl	Countee Garby		
2008	Madagascar: Escape 2 Africa	Baby Gloria (voice)		
2009	Merry Madagascar	Abby (voice)	Television film	
2021	A Man Named Scott	Herself	Documentary	
2026	Slime	Muna (voice)		

=== Television ===
Year	Title	Role	Notes	Ref.
2009–2010	True Jackson, VP	Young True	2 episodes	
2017	Neo Yokio	Helenist (voice)	Episode: "O, the Helenists"	
2018	Adventure Time	Beth the Pup Princess (voice)	Episode: "Come Along with Me"	
2018–2023	Red Table Talk	Co-host	129 episodes	
2022-2023	We Baby Bears	Unica (voice)	7 episodes	
2022	Saturday Night Live	Musical guest	2 episodes	

== Tours ==
=== Headlining ===
- Whip My Hair Tour (2011-2012)
- Willow & Erys Tour (with Jaden Smith) (2019)
- lifE Tour (2021)

=== Supporting ===
- Jhené Aiko – Trip (The Tour) (2018)
- Machine Gun Kelly – Mainstream Sellout Tour (2022)
- Childish Gambino – The New World Tour (2024)
- Coldplay – Music of the Spheres World Tour (2025)

== Awards and nominations ==
Year	Award	Category	Nominee	Results	Ref.
2008	Young Artist Awards	Best Performance in a Feature Film (Young Actress Age Ten or Younger)	I Am Legend	Nominated	
2009	Young Artist Awards	Best Performance in a Feature Film (Young Ensemble Cast)	Kit Kittredge: An American Girl	Won	
2010	Annie Award	Outstanding Achievement for Voice Acting in a Television Production	Merry Madagascar	Nominated	
2010	BET Awards	YoungStar Award	Herself	Nominated	
2011	NAACP Image Award	Outstanding New Artist	Herself	Won	
2011	NAACP Image Award	Outstanding Music Video	"Whip My Hair"	Nominated	
2011	O Music Awards	Most Viral Video	"Whip My Hair"	Won	
2011	BET Awards	Video of the Year	"Whip My Hair"	Nominated	
2011	BET Awards	Best New Artist	"Whip My Hair"	Nominated	
2011	BET Awards	YoungStar Award	Herself	Won	
2012	BET Awards	YoungStar Award	Herself	Nominated	
2012	MP3 Music Awards	The BTM Award	"Fireball" (featuring Nicki Minaj)	Nominated	
2013	MP3 Music Awards	The BTM Award	"I Am Me"	Won	
2014	VEVO Certified Awards	100,000,000 views	"Whip My Hair"	Won	
2016	The Fashion Awards	New Fashion Icon	Herself (with Jaden Smith)	Won	
2016	BET Awards	YoungStar Award	Herself	Nominated	
2019	NAACP Image Awards	Outstanding Host in a Talk or News/Information (Series or Special)	Red Table Talk	Won	
2020	Daytime Emmy Awards	Outstanding Informative Talk Show Host	Red Table Talk	Nominated	
2020	Queerty Awards	Closet Door Bustdown	Herself	Nominated	
2021	Daytime Emmy Awards	Outstanding Informative Talk Show Host	Red Table Talk	Nominated	
2021	British LGBT Awards	Celebrity	Herself	Nominated	
2021	MTV Video Music Awards	Best Alternative Video	"Transparent Soul" (featuring Travis Barker)	Nominated	
2021	MTV Europe Music Awards	Best Alternative	"Transparent Soul" (featuring Travis Barker)	Nominated	
2022	iHeartRadio Music Awards	Best New Alternative Artist	Herself	Nominated	
2022	MTV Video Music Awards	Best Alternative Video	"Emo Girl" (featuring Machine Gun Kelly)	Nominated	
2022	MTV Video Music Awards	Best Alternative Video	"Grow" (featuring Avril Lavigne)	Nominated	
2022	NAACP Image Awards	Outstanding Host in a Talk or News/Information (Series or Special)	Red Table Talk	Won	
2023	NAACP Image Awards	Outstanding Host in a Talk or News/Information (Series or Special)	Red Table Talk	Nominated	
2025	Grammy Awards	Best Arrangement, Instrumental, and Vocals	"Big Feelings"	Nominated	
2025	Grammy Awards	Grammy Award for Best Engineered Album, Non-Classical	"Empathogen"	Nominated	
