= Transparent Soul =

2021 single by Willow Smith

Single by Willow featuring Travis Barker

from the album Lately I Feel Everything
- Written: 2019
- Released: April 27, 2021
- Recorded: 2019–2020
- Genre: Pop-punk; skate punk
- Length: 2:48
- Label: MSFTS; Roc Nation
- Songwriters: Willow Smith; Travis Barker; Tyler Cole
- Producer: Tyler Cole

Willow singles chronology
| "Hey, You!" (2020) | "Transparent Soul" (2021) | "Buzzed" (2021) |

Kid Cudi remix cover

Music videos
- "Transparent Soul" (Performance Visual) on YouTube
- "Transparent Soul" (Music Video) on YouTube

"Transparent Soul" (stylized as "t r a n s p a r e n t s o u l") is a song by American singer-songwriter Willow featuring American drummer Travis Barker. It was released on April 27, 2021, by MSFTS and Roc Nation, as the lead single from her fourth solo studio album Lately I Feel Everything. The song has been described by publications such as Rolling Stone and Guitar World as a pop-punk track about ingenuine people. A remix of the song featuring American rapper Kid Cudi was released on November 19, 2021.

== Background ==
"Transparent Soul" was written during a "very introspective time" at the beginning of the COVID-19 pandemic, and was inspired by a quote from guru Radhanath Swami. Willow was inclined to enter the punk rock genre by her mother Jada Pinkett Smith, who previously fronted the nu metal band Wicked Wisdom.

Lyrically, the song details Willow's struggles with fake people who seek to exploit her, which she can tell by her ability to see the qualities through their "transparent" souls. She plays an Ernie Ball Music Man St. Vincent signature guitar on the track.

== Music video ==
A performance visual for "Transparent Soul" was released alongside the song on April 27, 2021. The visual features Willow dressed in "classic punk attire—spiked collars and all" while performing the single. Revolt described it as "almost reminiscent of classic rock and roll videos", with Willow "rocking wild fashions that range from colorful to goth" overlaid with various special effects." Travis Barker does not make an appearance in the "short-yet-energetic" production. As of March 2022, the visual has received over 17 million views on YouTube.

The official music video for "Transparent Soul", with both Willow and Barker, was released on May 28, 2021. The video featured a cameo appearance from DJ duo Simi and Haze Khadra. In the video, Willow is seen in a "dingy rock club" performing the song with Barker, when she runs into a mysterious and terrifying figure who follows her. She collapses on the ground, and the video ends with her reaching her hand out to the figure.

== Remix ==
On November 19, 2021, Willow released the official remix to "Transparent Soul" featuring vocals from American rapper Kid Cudi, marking the second collaboration between the two, following Willow’s appearance on "Rose Golden" from Cudi's sixth album Passion, Pain & Demon Slayin' (2016).

== Personnel ==
Credits adapted from Tidal.

- Willow Smith – vocals, composition, lyrics
- Travis Barker – drums, composition, lyrics
- Tyler Cole – production, composition, lyrics
- Emerson Mancini – mastering
- Mario J. McNulty – mixing
- Zach Brown – engineering

== Charts ==
=== Weekly charts ===
Weekly chart performance for "Transparent Soul"
| Chart (2021) | Peak position |
|---|---|
| Belgium (Ultratip Bubbling Under Flanders) | 44 |
| Canada Hot 100 (Billboard) | 54 |
| Canada Rock (Billboard) | 38 |
| Global 200 (Billboard) | 84 |
| Ireland (IRMA) | 26 |
| Lithuania (AGATA) | 73 |
| New Zealand (Recorded Music NZ) | 37 |
| UK Singles (OCC) | 28 |
| US Billboard Hot 100 | 76 |
| US Hot Rock & Alternative Songs (Billboard) | 10 |
| US Rock & Alternative Airplay (Billboard) | 9 |

=== Year-end charts ===
Year-end chart performance for "Transparent Soul"
| Chart (2021) | Position |
|---|---|
| US Hot Rock & Alternative Songs (Billboard) | 19 |
| US Rock Airplay (Billboard) | 38 |

== Certifications ==
| Region | Certification | Certified units/sales |
|---|---|---|
| Brazil (Pro-Música Brasil) | Gold | 20,000^{‡} |
| New Zealand (RMNZ) | Gold | 15,000^{‡} |
| United Kingdom (BPI) | Silver | 200,000^{‡} |
| United States (RIAA) | Platinum | 1,000,000^{‡} |
^{‡} Sales+streaming figures based on certification alone.

== Release history ==
Release dates and formats for "Transparent Soul"
| Region | Date | Format | Version | Label | Ref. |
|---|---|---|---|---|---|
| Various | April 27, 2021 | Digital download; streaming | Original | MSFTSMusic; Roc Nation | |
| United States | May 25, 2021 | Alternative radio | Original | Roc Nation | |
| United States | May 25, 2021 | Mainstream rock radio | Original | Roc Nation | |
| United States | August 24, 2021 | Contemporary hit radio | Original | Roc Nation | |
| Various | November 19, 2021 | Digital download; streaming | Kid Cudi remix | MSFTSMusic; Roc Nation | |
