= Lately I Feel Everything =

Studio album by Willow
- Released: July 16, 2021
- Recorded: 2020
- Studios: Conway Recordings Studios (Los Angeles, California)
- Genres: Pop-punk; alternative rock; pop rock; grunge; emo; indie rock; nu metal
- Length: 26:04
- Labels: MSFTS; Roc Nation; Polydor
- Producers: Willow; Tyler Cole

Willow chronology
The Anxiety (2020)	Lately I Feel Everything (2021)	Coping Mechanism (2022)

Singles from Lately I Feel Everything
- 1. "Transparent Soul" Released: April 27, 2021; 2. "Lipstick" Released: June 25, 2021; 3. "Grow" Released: October 19, 2021; 4. "Gaslight" Released: November 23, 2021

Lately I Feel Everything (stylized as lately I feel EVERYTHING) is the fourth solo studio album by American singer Willow. It was released through MSFTSMusic, Roc Nation and Polydor Records on July 16, 2021. A departure from the experimental alt-R&B sound of her early works and instead her pop-punk and indie rock debut, it features guest appearances from Travis Barker, Avril Lavigne, Tierra Whack, Cherry Glazerr, and Ayla Tesler-Mabe.

The album has spawned three singles, "Transparent Soul", "Lipstick", and "Gaslight", the first of which entered the top 40 in the United Kingdom, Ireland, and New Zealand, as well as becoming Willow's first entry on the Billboard Hot 100 in a decade, where it peaked at number 76.

== Composition ==
Lately I Feel Everything, the fourth album by singer Willow, poses another wide musical leap for the musician. Where 2019's self-titled record leapt into psychedelic soul, Lately dives head on into alternative rock, pop-punk, indie rock, emo, grunge, nu metal, and pop rock, with elements of power pop.

== Critical reception ==
Professional ratings
Aggregate scores
Source	Rating
AnyDecentMusic?	6.9/10
Metacritic	79/100
Review scores
Source	Rating
AllMusic	4/5 stars
Clash	7/10
Exclaim!	7/10
Gigwise	7/10
The Guardian	4/5 stars
iNews	4/5 stars
Kerrang!	4/5
The Line of Best Fit	8/10
NME	4/5 stars
Pitchfork	6.6/10

=== Accolades ===
Year-end lists
Publication	List	Rank	Ref.
Billboard	The 50 Best Albums of 2021: Staff List	41	
BrooklynVegan	The 50 Best Punk Albums of 2021	29	
CED Radio	Top Albums of 2021	5	
Complex	The Best Albums of 2021	43	
Dazed	The Best Albums of 2021	13	
Dork	The Best Albums of 2021	17	
Good Morning America	The 50 Best Albums of 2021	44	
Kerrang!	The 50 Best Albums of 2021	34	
The Forty-Five	The 45 Best Albums of 2021	30	
The Independent	The 40 Best Albums of 2021	39	
The Line of Best Fit	The Best Albums of 2021 Ranked	49	
NPR Music	The 50 Best Albums of 2021	17	
Okayplayer	The Best Albums of 2021 Ranked	18	

== Commercial performance ==
Lately I Feel Everything debuted at number 46 on the US Billboard 200. The album entered the UK Album Sales chart at number 85.

== Track listing ==
Lately I Feel Everything track listing
No.	Title	Writer(s)	Producer(s)	Length
1.	"Transparent Soul" (featuring Travis Barker)	Willow Smith; Barker; Tyler Cole	Cole	2:48
2.	"Fuck You"	Smith	Cole	0:36
3.	"Gaslight" (featuring Travis Barker)	Smith; Cole	Cole	1:49
4.	"Don't Save Me"	Smith	Willow	1:53
5.	"Naïve"	Smith; Cole	Cole	2:49
6.	"Lipstick"	Smith	Willow	3:11
7.	"Come Home" (featuring Ayla Tesler-Mabe)	Smith; Cole; Tesler-Mabe	Cole	3:37
8.	"4ever"	Smith; Cole	Cole	2:41
9.	"Xtra" (featuring Tierra Whack)	Smith; Cole; Whack	Cole	2:21
10.	"Grow" (with Avril Lavigne featuring Travis Barker)	Smith; Cole; Lavigne; Barker	Cole	2:09
11.	"Breakout" (featuring Cherry Glazerr)	Smith; Cole; Clementine Creevy	Cole	2:10
Total length:				26:04

Notes

- "Transparent Soul" is stylized as "t r a n s p a r e n t s o u l"
- "Fuck You" is stylized as "F**K You"
- "Don't Save Me" is stylized as "don't SAVE ME"
- "Naïve" is stylized in lowercase
- "Xtra" is stylized in all caps
- "Grow" is stylized as "G R O W"
- "Breakout" is stylized as "¡BREAKOUT!"

== Personnel ==
- Willow Smith – vocals
- Zach Brown – engineering (all tracks), mixing (2–4, 6–7, 9, 11)
- Emerson Mancini – mastering (all tracks)
- Tyler Cole – drums, guitar, programming (6)
- Travis Barker – drums, programming (1, 3, 10)
- Mario McNulty – mixing (1, 3–4, 6–11)
- Matt Chamberlain – drums (2, 4–11)
- Ayla Tesler-Mabe – vocals (7)
- Tierra Whack – vocals (9)
- Avril Lavigne – vocals (10)
- Cherry Glazerr – vocals (11)

== Charts ==
Chart performance for Lately I Feel Everything
Chart (2021)	Peak position
Lithuanian Albums (AGATA)	49
Scottish Albums (Official Charts)	84
US Billboard 200	46
US Top Alternative Albums (Billboard)	5
US Independent Albums (Billboard)	6
US Top Rock Albums (Billboard)	10
