= Willow (Willow album) =

2019 studio album by Willow

Studio album by Willow
- Released: July 19, 2019
- Genres: Dream pop; folk; psychedelic soul; R&B
- Length: 22:34
- Labels: MSFTS; Roc Nation
- Producers: Willow; Tyler Cole

Willow chronology
| The 1st (2017) | Willow (2019) | The Anxiety (2020) |

Alternative cover
- Updated cover on streaming and digital platforms

Professional ratings
Review scores
| Source | Rating |
|---|---|
| AllMusic | 3/5 stars |
| NME | 3/5 stars |
| Pitchfork | 6.2/10 |

Willow is the third studio album by American singer-songwriter Willow. It was released on July 19, 2019, through MSFTS Music and Roc Nation. The album includes a feature from her brother Jaden, and is the follow-up to her last project The 1st (2017). The album was written and produced entirely by Willow and Tyler Cole.

== Background ==
The album and its promotional tour were announced on Smith's social media on June 24, with tour dates being released four days later. The tracks are interpolated and have themes such as female empowerment, relationships and being born in the wrong generation.

== Composition ==
Willow's previous record The 1st channeled the sounds of 1990s alternative musicians, yielding comparisons to Tori Amos, Tracy Chapman, Alanis Morissette and others. With her self-titled album, she would leap into "spacey" and psychedelic terrain. The songs have been seen as both psych-folk and psych soul, as well as dream pop and "dreamy" R&B.

== Track listing ==
All tracks are written by Willow Smith and Tyler Cole, except where noted.

| No. | Title | Producer(s) | Length |
|---|---|---|---|
| 1. | "Like a Bird" (Willow Smith) | Willow | 2:49 |
| 2. | "Female Energy, Part 2" | Tyler Cole | 2:54 |
| 3. | "Time Machine" | Cole | 2:24 |
| 4. | "PrettyGirlz" | Willow | 2:49 |
| 5. | "Samo Is Now" (Willow Smith) | Willow | 2:07 |
| 6. | "Then (Interlude)" | Willow; Cole^{[a]} | 0:58 |
| 7. | "U Know" (featuring Jaden) (Willow Smith, Cole, Jaden Smith) | Cole | 3:06 |
| 8. | "Overthinking It" | Cole | 5:28 |
| Total length: | | | 22:34 |

Notes

- ^{^a} signifies a co-producer

== Personnel ==
- Willow – vocals, production
- Jabs – vocals, production
- Mel "Chaos" Lewis – production
- James Chul Rim – production, recording, mixing
- Calvin Bailiff – engineering
- Phil Scott – engineering
- Zach Brown – production, recording, mixing
- Oren Pine – drums

== Charts ==
Chart performance for Willow
| Chart (2019) | Peak position |
|---|---|
| US Heatseekers Albums (Billboard) | 22 |
| US Top Alternative Albums (Billboard) | 19 |
