= Flames (Mod Sun song) =

Single by Mod Sun featuring Avril Lavigne

from the album Internet Killed the Rockstar
- Released: January 8, 2021
- Recorded: 2020
- Genre: Emo pop; pop punk; punk rock; pop
- Length: 2:31
- Label: Big Noise
- Songwriters: Avril Lavigne; Derek Smith; John Feldmann
- Producer: John Feldmann

Mod Sun singles chronology
| "Bones" (2020) | "Flames" (2021) | "Heavy" (2021) |

Avril Lavigne singles chronology
| "We Are Warriors" (2020) | "Flames" (2021) | "Bite Me" (2021) |

Music videos
- "Flames" on YouTube; "Flames" (Acoustic version) on YouTube

"Flames" is a song by American singer Mod Sun featuring Canadian singer-songwriter Avril Lavigne. The song was released by Big Noise on January 8, 2021, as the third single from Mod Sun's fourth studio album Internet Killed the Rockstar. The song was written by Mod Sun, Lavigne and John Feldmann, and produced by the latter.

== Background and release ==
In December 2020, Lavigne confirmed she was recording music with Mod Sun along with producers John Feldmann, Travis Barker and Machine Gun Kelly. Mod Sun also declared in December 2020 that his upcoming fourth studio album will include one collaboration with another singer. In January 2021, the featured artist was revealed to be Lavigne.

"Flames" was announced on January 1, 2021 when Mod Sun and Lavigne posted the pre-save link together with the single's cover on Instagram and Twitter. "Flames" was released for digital download and streaming on January 8, 2021 through Big Noise.

"Flames" was Mod Sun's fastest growing single on streaming platforms, garnering over 1 million plays on Spotify in its third day on the platform. The singer stated this was a highlight for his career and thanked Lavigne for believing in his work. The song became a moderate hit on rock and alternative radio.

On April 16, 2021, an acoustic version of the song was released, which had a music video released on April 23.

=== Music video ===
Mod Sun and Avril Lavigne confirmed that they were making a new music video for "Flames" through their social media posts and comments in response to fans. It was also confirmed through Instagram stories and comments that the video was shot on January 13, 2021. On January 20 it was announced that the music video would be released on January 22, 2021.

== Critical reception ==
"Flames" was met with generally positive reviews upon its release from music critics. Tamara Bay of Wall of Sound wrote that the song is "an emo pop jam which sees Avril and Mod Sun's vocals ebb and flow together like two peas in a pod". Music Feeds' Laura English praised the song calling it "a catchy bop that mashes pop sensibilities with emo AF lyrics and vocals". Writing for Stereo Board, Laura Johnson labeled the song "a pop-punk ballad that deals heavily in fire imagery and an earworm chorus". Alternative Press described the song as punk rock while Rachel Dowd of Alternative Press praised the song by saying that it "opens up with Lavigne and a haunting piano before heavy rock guitars and percussion kick in along with Mod Sun's distinct vocals. Idolator's Mike Wass called the song a "power-punk anthem, which contains massive pop hooks. Entertainment Weekly placed the song on its "Friday Five" list which lists the five best songs released in that week according to its editors.

== Charts ==
Chart performance for "Flames"
| Chart (2021) | Peak position |
|---|---|
| Canada (Hot Canadian Digital Songs) | 50 |
| New Zealand Hot Singles (RMNZ) | 40 |
| UK Singles Downloads (Official Charts) | 74 |
| US Alternative Airplay (Billboard) | 21 |
| US Hot Rock & Alternative Songs (Billboard) | 35 |

== Release history ==
Release dates and formats for "Flames"
| Region | Date | Formats | Version | Label | Ref. |
|---|---|---|---|---|---|
| Various | January 8, 2021 | Digital download; streaming | Original | Big Noise | |
| Various | April 16, 2021 | Digital download; streaming | Acoustic | Big Noise | |
