= List of artists by number of UK Rock & Metal Singles Chart number ones =

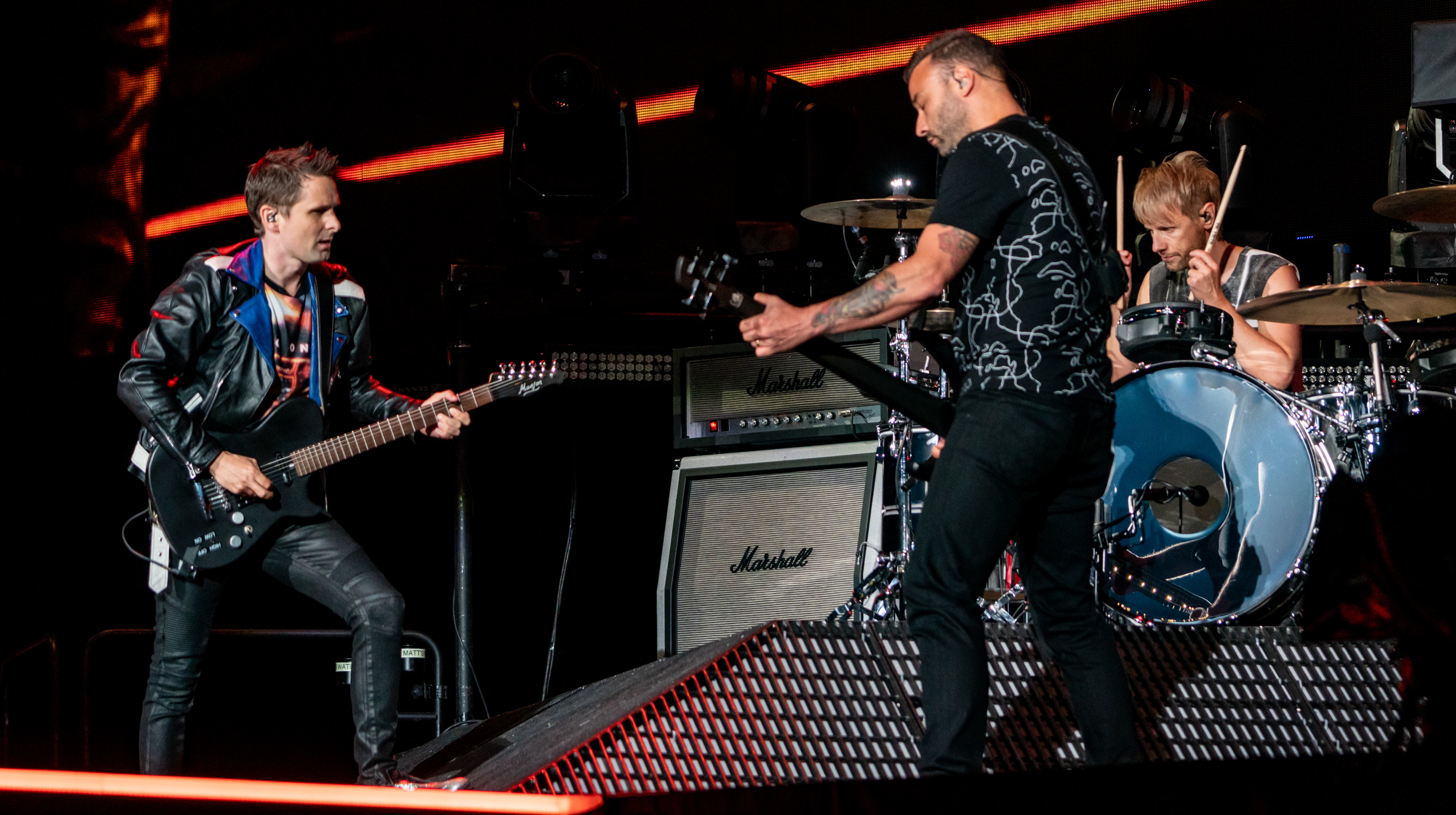
Muse have topped the UK Rock & Metal Singles Chart with 15 songs and spent 40 weeks at number one.

The UK Rock & Metal Singles Chart is a record chart which ranks the best-selling rock and heavy metal songs in the United Kingdom. Compiled and published by the Official Charts Company, the data is based on each song's weekly physical sales, digital downloads (since 2007) and streams (since 2015), and is currently published every Friday. The chart was first published on 9 October 1994, when American hard rock band Bon Jovi was number one with the Cross Road single "Always".

As of the chart week ending on 26 November 2026, a total of 397 songs have topped the UK Rock & Metal Singles Chart. 11 artists have topped the chart with eight or more different songs. The most successful are American group Foo Fighters and British rock band Muse who have both reached number one with 15 different songs. Five more artists have topped the chart with ten or more different songs: Linkin Park has 14 while Bon Jovi, My Chemical Romance and Bring Me the Horizon with 12 each, and Nickelback with 11. The current number-one is "Iris" by Goo Goo Dolls.

== Artists ==
The following artists have been credited on at least eight different number one songs, as recognised by the OCC.

Key
†	Indicates that the song reached the top ten of the UK Singles Chart

Artist	Number-one songs	Total weeks at number one	Songs	Record label(s)	First reached number one	Weeks at number one	Ref.
Muse	15	40	"Hyper Music / Feeling Good"	Mushroom	1 December 2001	1	
Muse	15	40	"Time Is Running Out" †	East West	20 September 2003	1	
Muse	15	40	"Hysteria"	East West	13 December 2003	1	
Muse	15	40	"Supermassive Black Hole" †	A&E	1 July 2006	5	
Muse	15	40	"Starlight"	Helium 3 Warner Bros.	16 September 2006	4	
Muse	15	40	"Knights of Cydonia" †	Helium 3 Warner Bros.	9 December 2006	2	
Muse	15	40	"Invincible"	Helium 3 Warner Bros.	21 April 2007	2	
Muse	15	40	"Feeling Good"	A&E	7 February 2009	11	
Muse	15	40	"Undisclosed Desires"	Warner Bros.	28 November 2009	4	
Muse	15	40	"Resistance"	Warner Bros.	6 March 2010	3	
Muse	15	40	"Psycho"	Helium 3 Warner Bros.	28 March 2015	1	
Muse	15	40	"Dead Inside"	Helium 3 Warner Bros.	4 April 2015	2	
Muse	15	40	"Mercy"	Helium 3 Warner Bros.	30 May 2015	1	
Muse	15	40	"Thought Contagion"	Warner Bros.	1 March 2018	1	
Muse	15	40	"Won't Stand Down"	Warner Bros.	27 January 2022	1	
Foo Fighters	15	32	"I'll Stick Around"	Roswell	16 September 1995	1	
Foo Fighters	15	32	"Big Me"	Roswell	6 April 1996	1	
Foo Fighters	15	32	"Monkey Wrench"	Roswell	10 May 1997	3	
Foo Fighters	15	32	"All My Life" †	RCA	19 October 2002	2	
Foo Fighters	15	32	"Times Like These"	RCA	18 January 2003	2	
Foo Fighters	15	32	"Best of You" †	RCA	11 June 2005	5	
Foo Fighters	15	32	"DOA"	RCA	17 September 2005	1	
Foo Fighters	15	32	"No Way Back/Cold Day in the Sun"	RCA	25 March 2006	1	
Foo Fighters	15	32	"Long Road to Ruin"	RCA	15 December 2007	4	
Foo Fighters	15	32	"Walk"	RCA	25 June 2011	3	
Foo Fighters	15	32	"Arlandria"	RCA	17 September 2011	2	
Foo Fighters	15	32	"Something from Nothing"	RCA	22 November 2014	2	
Foo Fighters	15	32	"Run"	RCA	15 June 2017	2	
Foo Fighters	15	32	"The Sky Is a Neighborhood"	Columbia	28 September 2017	3	
Foo Fighters	15	32	"Making a Fire"	Columbia	18 February 2021	1	
Linkin Park	14	56	"Papercut"	Warner Bros.	30 June 2001	4	
Linkin Park	14	56	"In the End" †	Warner Bros.	20 October 2001	1	
Linkin Park	14	56	"Pts.OF.Athrty" †	Warner Bros.	3 August 2002	1	
Linkin Park	14	56	"Somewhere I Belong" †	Warner Bros.	29 March 2003	5	
Linkin Park	14	56	"What I've Done" †	Warner Bros.	19 May 2007	5	
Linkin Park	14	56	"Bleed It Out"	Warner Bros.	1 September 2007	2	
Linkin Park	14	56	"New Divide"	Warner Bros.	20 June 2009	13	
Linkin Park	14	56	"The Catalyst"	Warner Bros.	18 September 2010	3	
Linkin Park	14	56	"Rolling in the Deep" (live)	Warner Bros.	16 July 2011	1	
Linkin Park	14	56	"Burn It Down"	Warner Bros.	28 April 2012	7	
Linkin Park	14	56	"Until It's Gone"	Warner Bros.	17 May 2014	2	
Linkin Park	14	56	"Numb"	Warner Bros.	3 August 2017	5	
Linkin Park	14	56	"Lost"	Warner Bros.	17 February 2023	1	
Linkin Park	14	56	"The Emptiness Machine" †	Warner Bros.	13 September 2024	6	
Bon Jovi	12	31	"Always" †	Mercury	15 October 1994	2	
Bon Jovi	12	31	"This Ain't a Love Song" †	Mercury	10 June 1995	4	
Bon Jovi	12	31	"Something for the Pain" †	Mercury	30 September 1995	1	
Bon Jovi	12	31	"These Days" †	Mercury	9 March 1996	3	
Bon Jovi	12	31	"Hey God"	Mercury	6 July 1996	1	
Bon Jovi	12	31	"Real Life"	Reprise	10 April 1999	3	
Bon Jovi	12	31	"Thank You for Loving Me"	Mercury	9 December 2000	3	
Bon Jovi	12	31	"One Wild Night" †	Mercury	19 May 2001	1	
Bon Jovi	12	31	"Everyday" †	Mercury	28 September 2002	1	
Bon Jovi	12	31	"All About Lovin' You" †	Mercury	24 May 2003	1	
Bon Jovi	12	31	"(You Want To) Make a Memory"	Mercury	7 July 2007	1	
Bon Jovi	12	31	"Livin' on a Prayer" †	Mercury	28 February 2009	11	
My Chemical Romance	12	31	"Helena"	Reprise	4 June 2005	1	
My Chemical Romance	12	31	"The Ghost of You"	Reprise	10 September 2005	1	
My Chemical Romance	12	31	"Welcome to the Black Parade" †	Reprise	21 October 2006	9	
My Chemical Romance	12	31	"Famous Last Words" †	Reprise	3 February 2007	6	
My Chemical Romance	12	31	"Desolation Row"	Reprise	21 February 2009	1	
My Chemical Romance	12	31	"Na Na Na (Na Na Na Na Na Na Na Na Na)"	Reprise	20 November 2010	4	
My Chemical Romance	12	31	"Planetary (Go!)"	Reprise	9 April 2011	1	
My Chemical Romance	12	31	"Sing"	Reprise	16 April 2011	4	
My Chemical Romance	12	31	"The World Is Ugly"	Reprise	29 December 2012	1	
My Chemical Romance	12	31	"Kiss the Ring"	Reprise	19 January 2013	1	
My Chemical Romance	12	31	"Fake Your Death"	Reprise	1 March 2014	1	
My Chemical Romance	12	31	"The Foundations of Decay"	Warner	20 May 2022	1	
Bring Me the Horizon	12	28	"Drown"	RCA	20 December 2014	1	
Bring Me the Horizon	12	28	"Happy Song"	RCA	23 July 2015	2	
Bring Me the Horizon	12	28	"Throne"	RCA	6 August 2015	13	
Bring Me the Horizon	12	28	"True Friends"	RCA	3 December 2015	1	
Bring Me the Horizon	12	28	"Follow You"	RCA	31 March 2016	1	
Bring Me the Horizon	12	28	"Mantra"	RCA	30 August 2018	1	
Bring Me the Horizon	12	28	"Parasite Eve"	RCA	9 July 2020	2	
Bring Me the Horizon	12	28	"Obey"	RCA	17 September 2020	2	
Bring Me the Horizon	12	28	"Teardrops"	RCA	30 October 2020	2	
Bring Me the Horizon	12	28	"Die4U"	RCA	24 September 2021	2	
Bring Me the Horizon	12	28	"Lost"	RCA	12 May 2023	1	
Bring Me the Horizon	12	28	"Kool-Aid"	RCA	12 January 2024	1	
Nickelback	11	60	"How You Remind Me" †	Roadrunner	9 March 2002	12	
Nickelback	11	60	"Too Bad" †	Roadrunner	31 August 2002	3	
Nickelback	11	60	"Someday" †	Roadrunner	27 September 2003	1	
Nickelback	11	60	"Feelin' Way Too Damn Good"	Roadrunner	27 March 2004	1	
Nickelback	11	60	"Photograph"	Roadrunner	8 October 2005	5	
Nickelback	11	60	"Far Away"	Roadrunner	25 February 2006	1	
Nickelback	11	60	"Rockstar" †	Roadrunner	24 November 2007	26	
Nickelback	11	60	"Gotta Be Somebody"	Roadrunner	29 November 2008	5	
Nickelback	11	60	"I'd Come for You"	Roadrunner	4 April 2009	2	
Nickelback	11	60	"If Today Was Your Last Day"	Roadrunner	13 June 2009	1	
Nickelback	11	60	"When We Stand Together"	Roadrunner	3 December 2011	3	
Green Day	9	39	"Stuck with Me"	Reprise	27 January 1996	1	
Green Day	9	39	"Hitchin' a Ride"	Reprise	11 October 1997	5	
Green Day	9	39	"Minority"	Reprise	30 September 2000	4	
Green Day	9	39	"Warning"	Reprise	23 December 2000	3	
Green Day	9	39	"American Idiot" †	Reprise	25 September 2004	5	
Green Day	9	39	"Boulevard of Broken Dreams" †	Reprise	11 December 2004	10	
Green Day	9	39	"Holiday"	Reprise	26 March 2005	4	
Green Day	9	39	"Wake Me Up When September Ends" †	Reprise	25 June 2005	7	
Green Day	9	39	"Bang Bang"	Reprise	25 August 2016	1	
Fall Out Boy	8	53	"My Songs Know What You Did in the Dark (Light Em Up)" †	Def Jam	16 February 2013	8	
Fall Out Boy	8	53	"The Phoenix"	Def Jam	13 April 2013	1	
Fall Out Boy	8	53	"Alone Together"	Def Jam	31 August 2013	2	
Fall Out Boy	8	53	"Young Volcanoes"	Def Jam	9 November 2013	5	
Fall Out Boy	8	53	"Centuries"	Island	20 September 2014	27	
Fall Out Boy	8	53	"Irresistible"	Def Jam	17 January 2015	5	
Fall Out Boy	8	53	"Uma Thurman"	Def Jam	24 January 2015	4	
Fall Out Boy	8	53	"Immortals"	Def Jam	13 June 2015	1	
Metallica	8	38	"Until It Sleeps" †	Vertigo	1 June 1996	2	
Metallica	8	38	"Hero of the Day"	Vertigo	28 September 1996	5	
Metallica	8	38	"Mama Said"	Vertigo	7 December 1996	1	
Metallica	8	38	"The Memory Remains"	Vertigo	22 November 1997	11	
Metallica	8	38	"The Unforgiven II"	Vertigo	7 March 1998	11	
Metallica	8	38	"Whiskey in the Jar"	Vertigo	27 February 1999	2	
Metallica	8	38	"Enter Sandman" †	Vertigo	12 July 2014	1	
Metallica	8	38	"Master of Puppets"	Vertigo	8 July 2022	6	
Iron Maiden	8	12	"Man on the Edge" †	EMI	7 October 1995	1	
Iron Maiden	8	12	"The Wicker Man" †	EMI	20 May 2000	2	
Iron Maiden	8	12	"Wildest Dreams" †	EMI	13 September 2003	1	
Iron Maiden	8	12	"Rainmaker"	EMI	6 December 2003	1	
Iron Maiden	8	12	"The Number of the Beast" (live) †	EMI	15 January 2005	2	
Iron Maiden	8	12	"The Trooper" (live) †	EMI	27 August 2005	2	
Iron Maiden	8	12	"Different World" †	EMI	6 January 2007	2	
Iron Maiden	8	12	"The Number of the Beast"	EMI	27 December 2014	1	

== See also ==
- List of artists by number of UK Rock & Metal Albums Chart number ones
- List of artists by number of UK Albums Chart number ones
- List of artists by number of UK Singles Chart number ones
