= List of artists by number of UK Rock & Metal Albums Chart number ones =

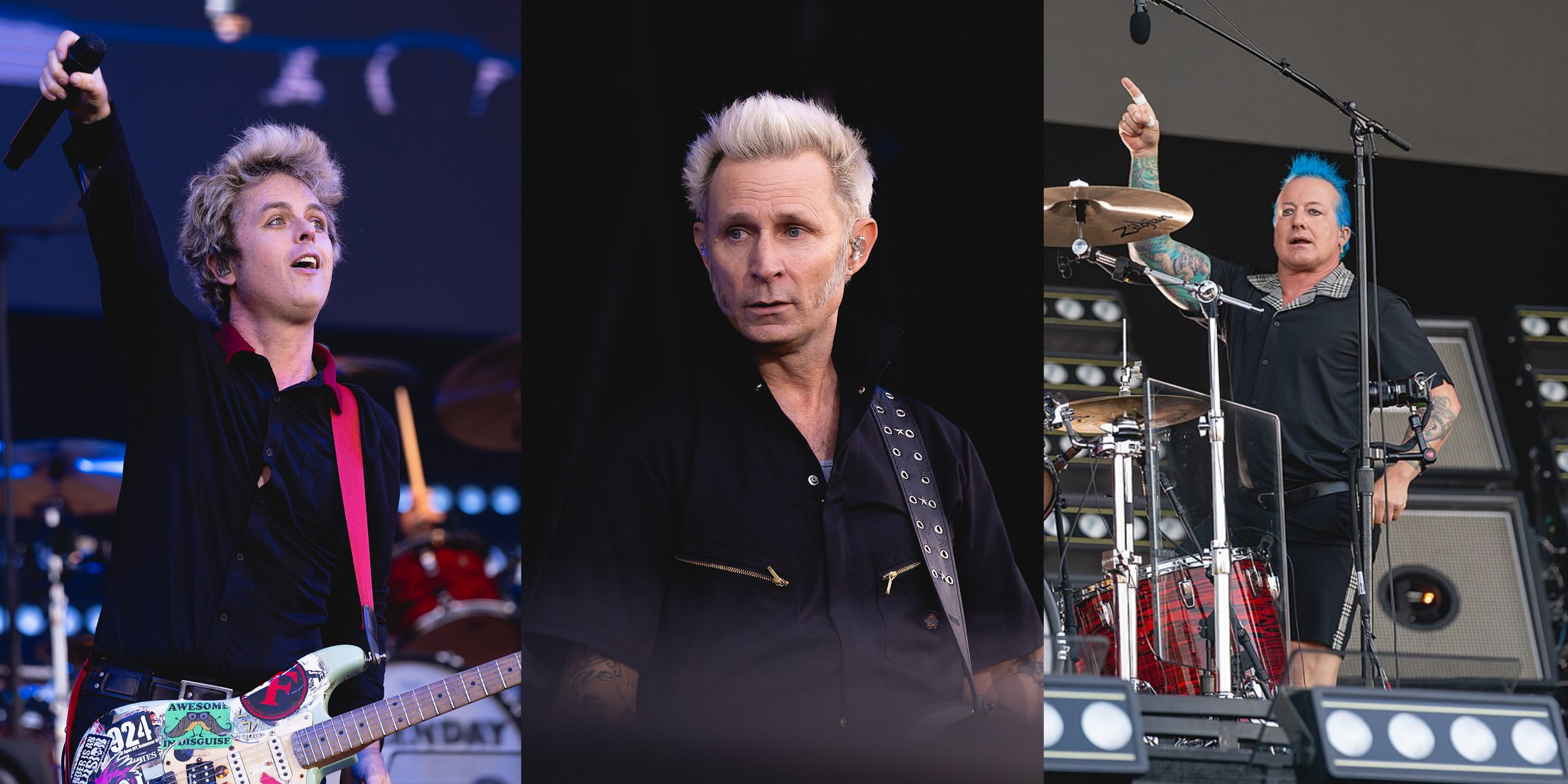
Green Day have topped the UK Rock & Metal Albums Chart with fifteen different albums, more than any other artist, and spent 76 weeks at number one.

The UK Rock & Metal Albums Chart is a record chart which ranks the best-selling rock and heavy metal albums in the United Kingdom. Compiled and published by the Official Charts Company, the data is based on each album's weekly physical sales, digital downloads (since 2007) and streams (since 2015), and is currently published every Friday. As of the chart published on 20 November 2026, a total of 843 albums by 364 artists have topped the UK Rock & Metal Albums Chart. The most successful artist are American pop punk band Green Day, who have topped the chart with 15 releases and spent a total of 76 weeks at number one.

== Artists ==
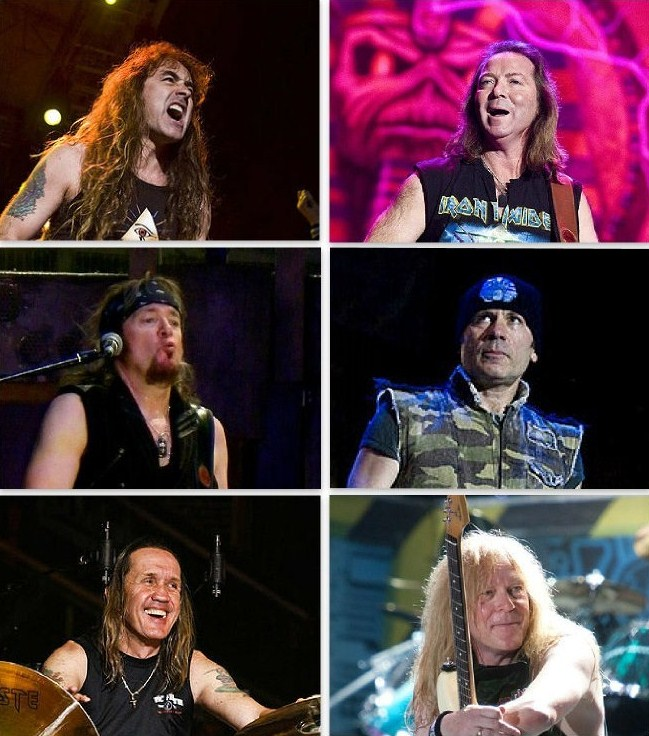
Iron Maiden have spent 19 weeks at number one with 14 releases.

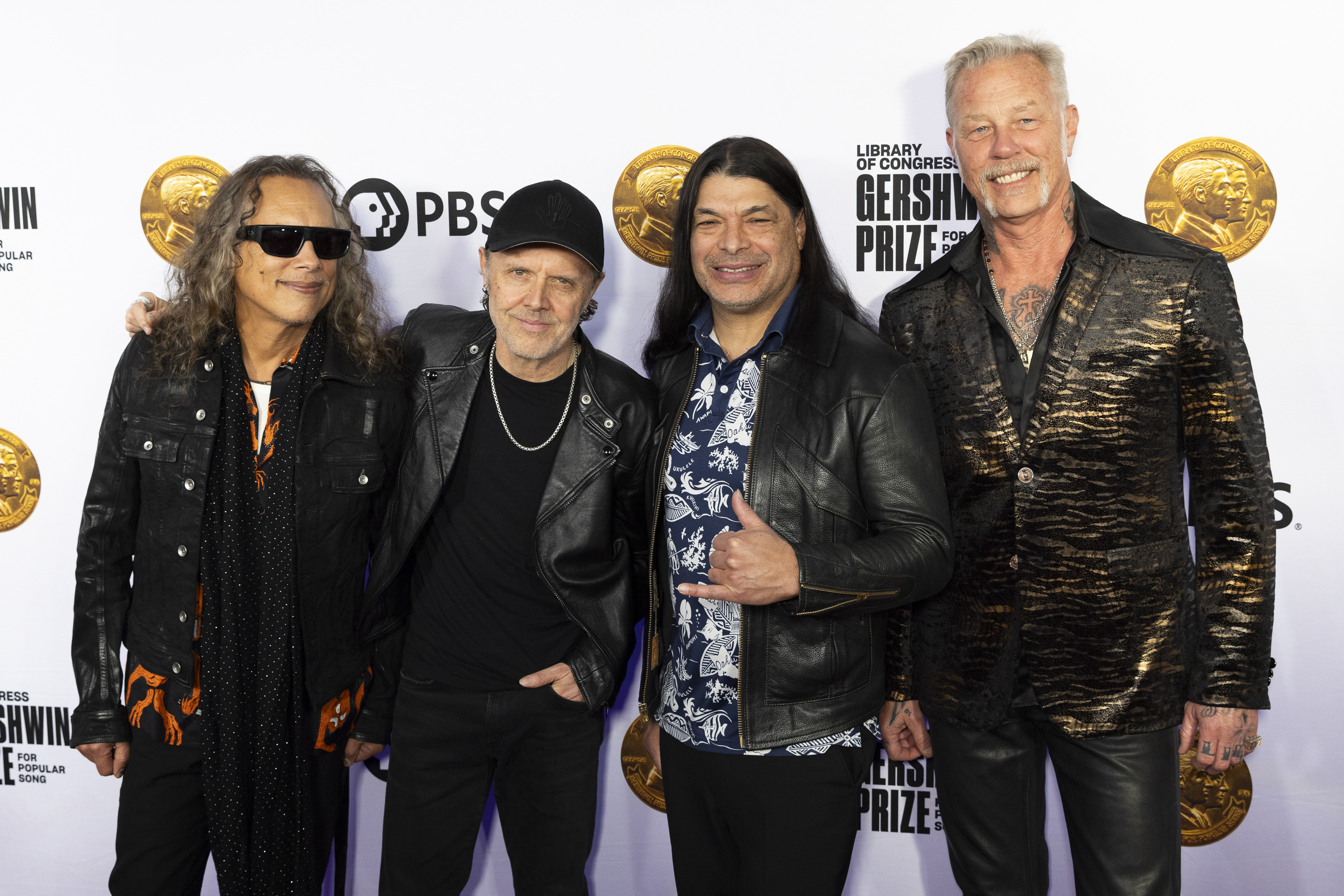
Metallica have topped the chart with 12 releases for a total 27 weeks.

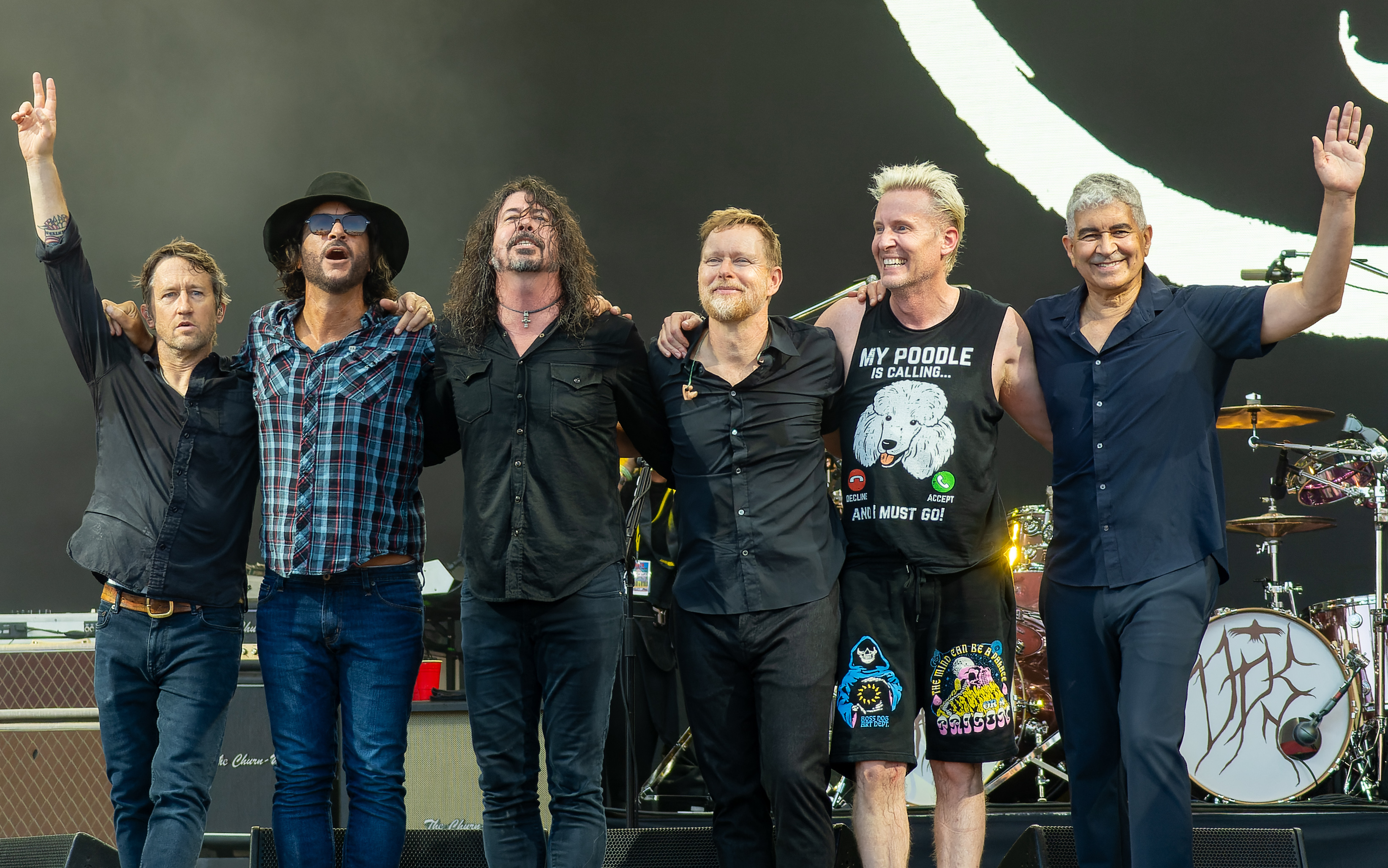
Foo Fighters have spent 85 weeks at number one with 12 albums.

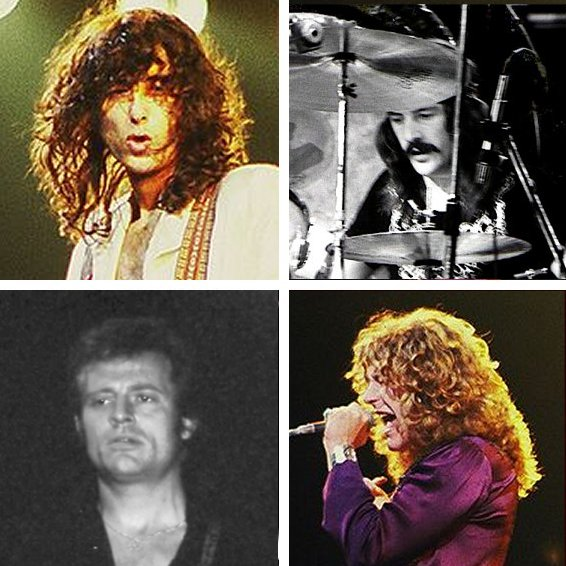
Ten releases by Led Zeppelin have topped the UK Rock & Metal Albums Chart.

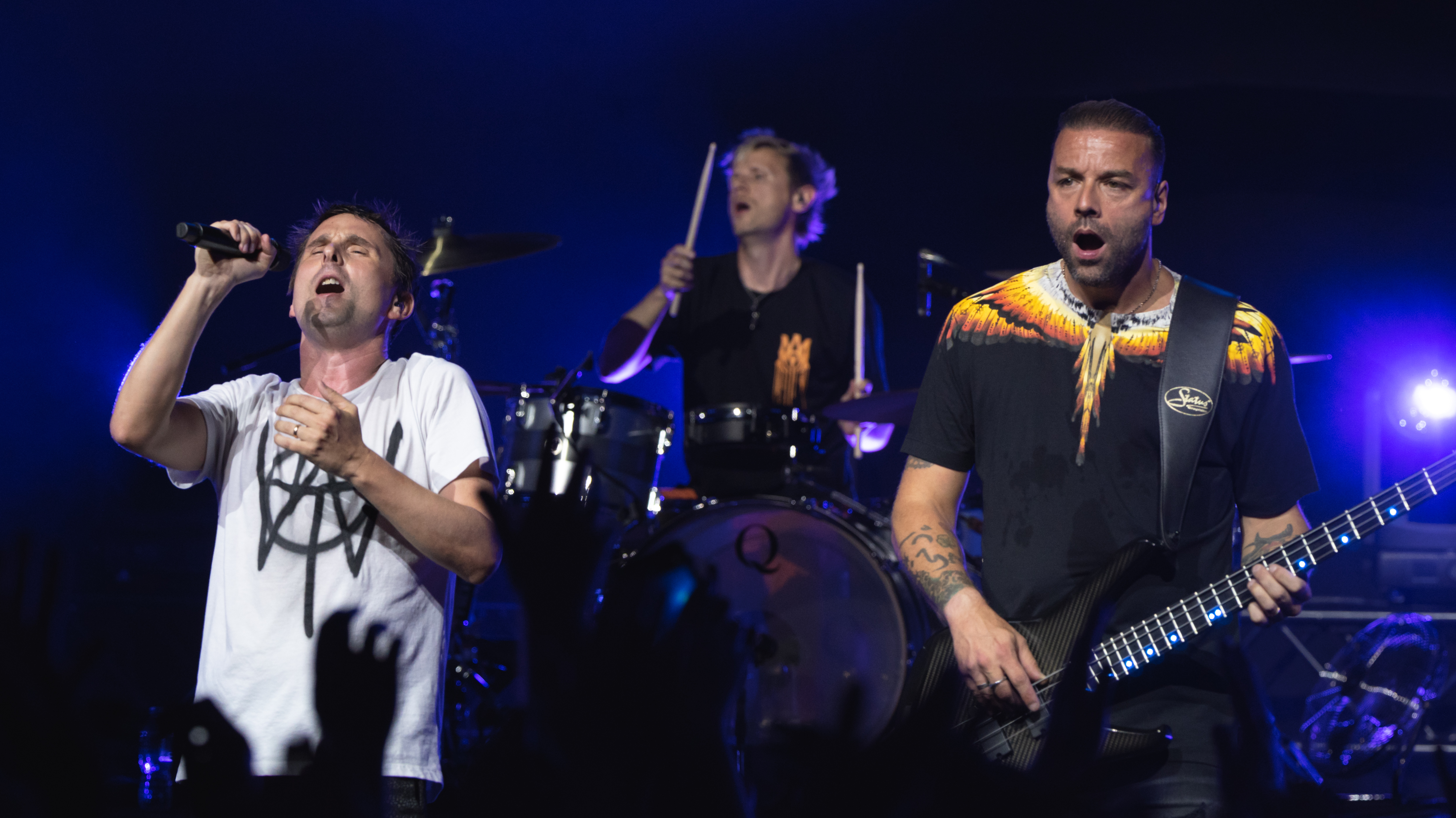
Muse have spent 60 weeks at number one with ten releases.

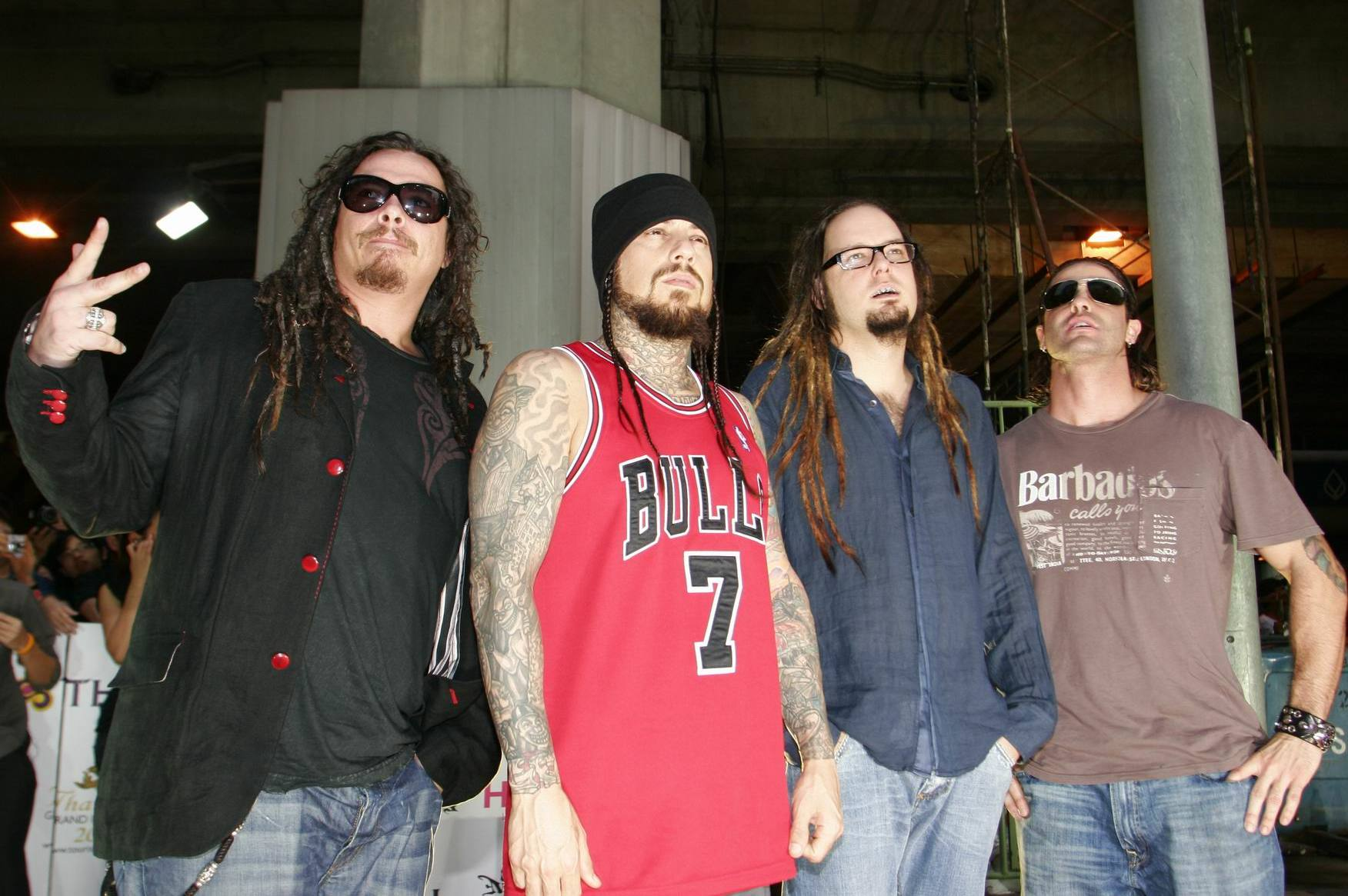
Korn have topped the UK Rock & Metal Albums Chart with nine studio albums.

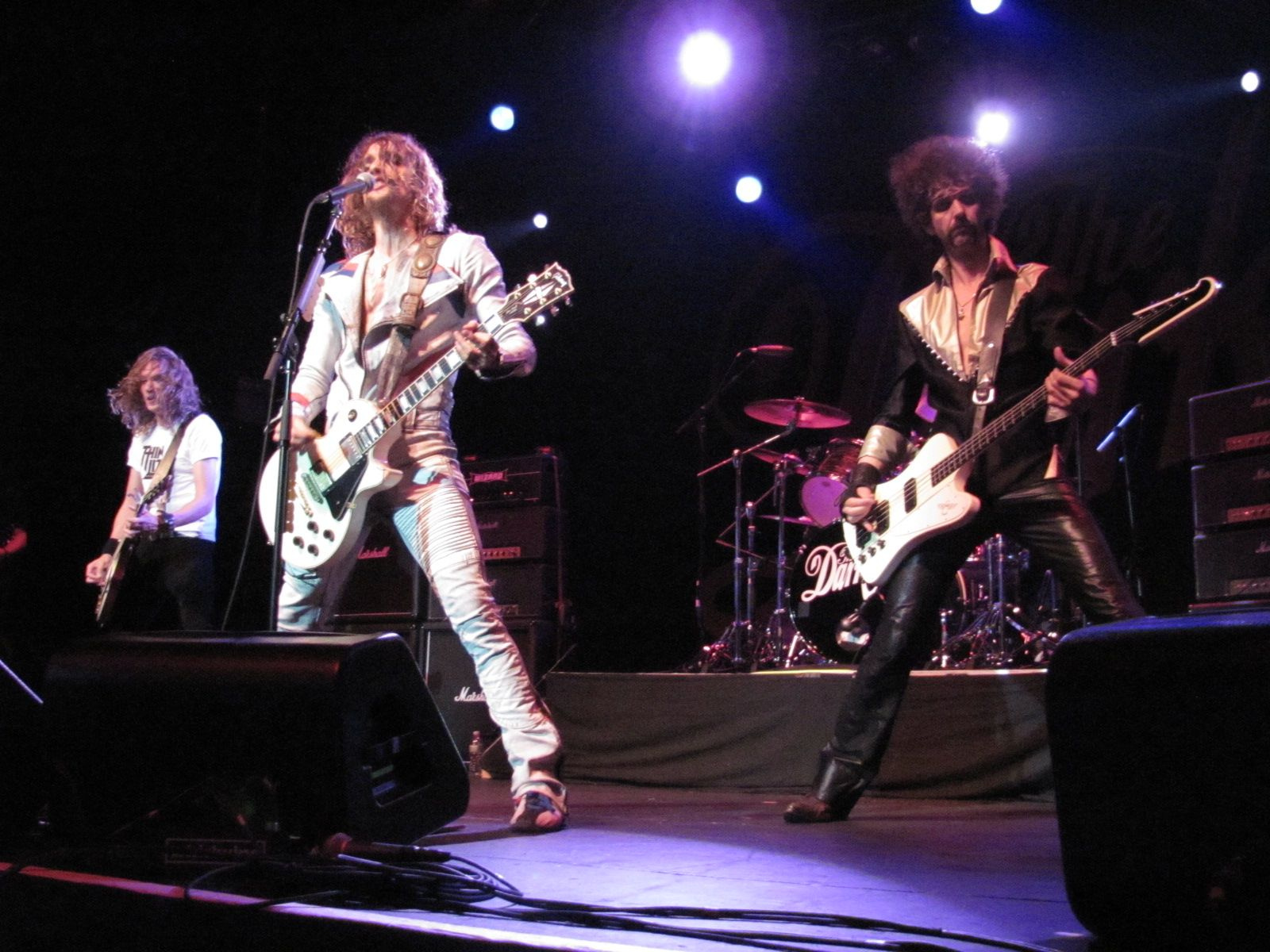
The Darkness have spent 29 weeks at number one with nine releases.

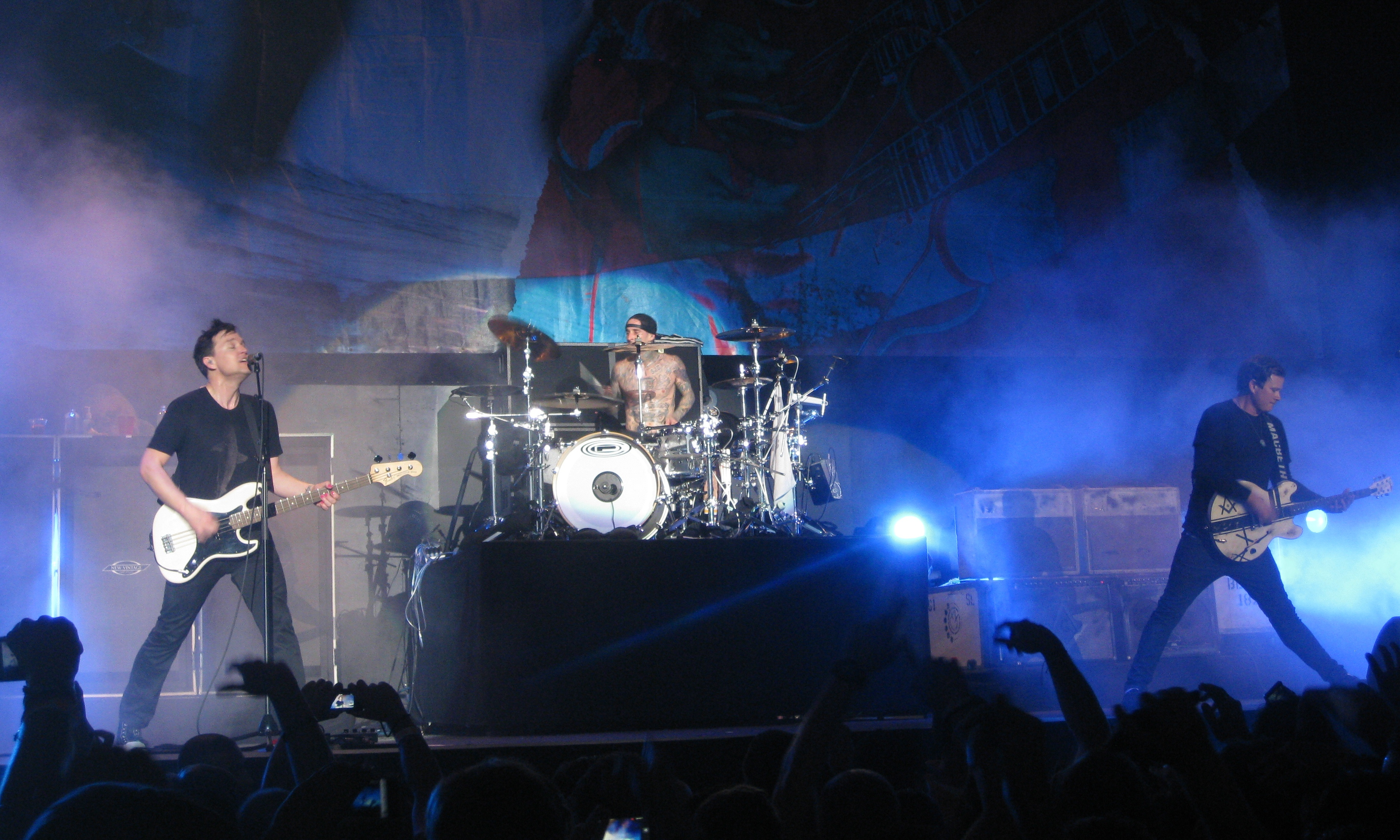
Blink-182 have topped the chart with eight albums for a total of 13 weeks.

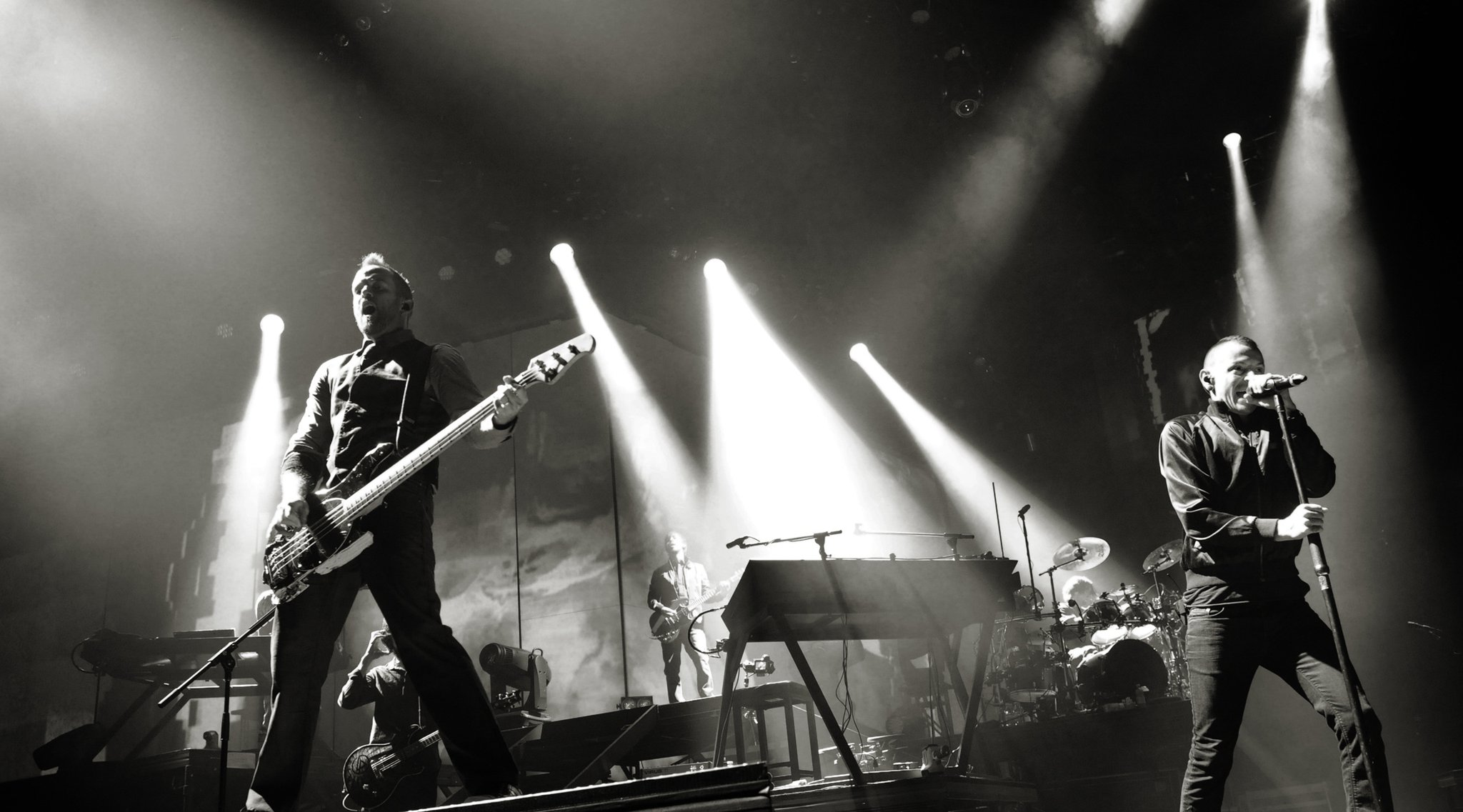
Linkin Park have spent 56 weeks at number one with eight albums

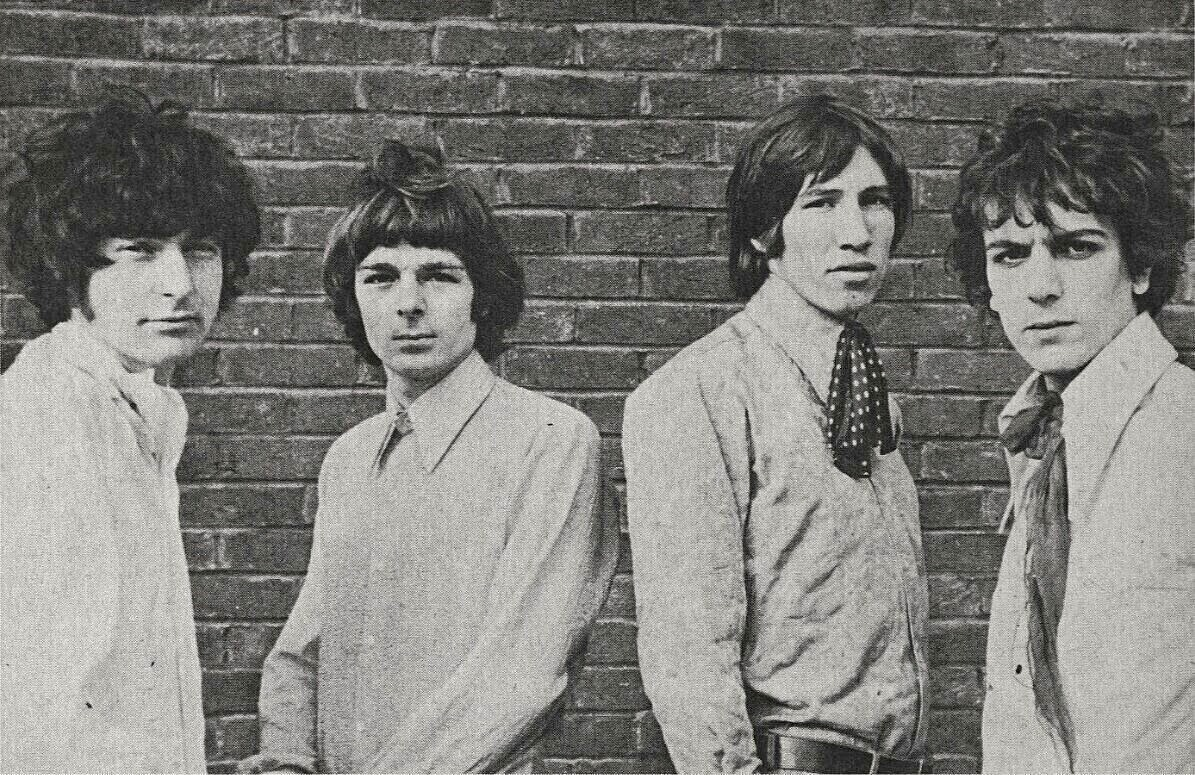
Pink Floyd have topped the album chart eight times.

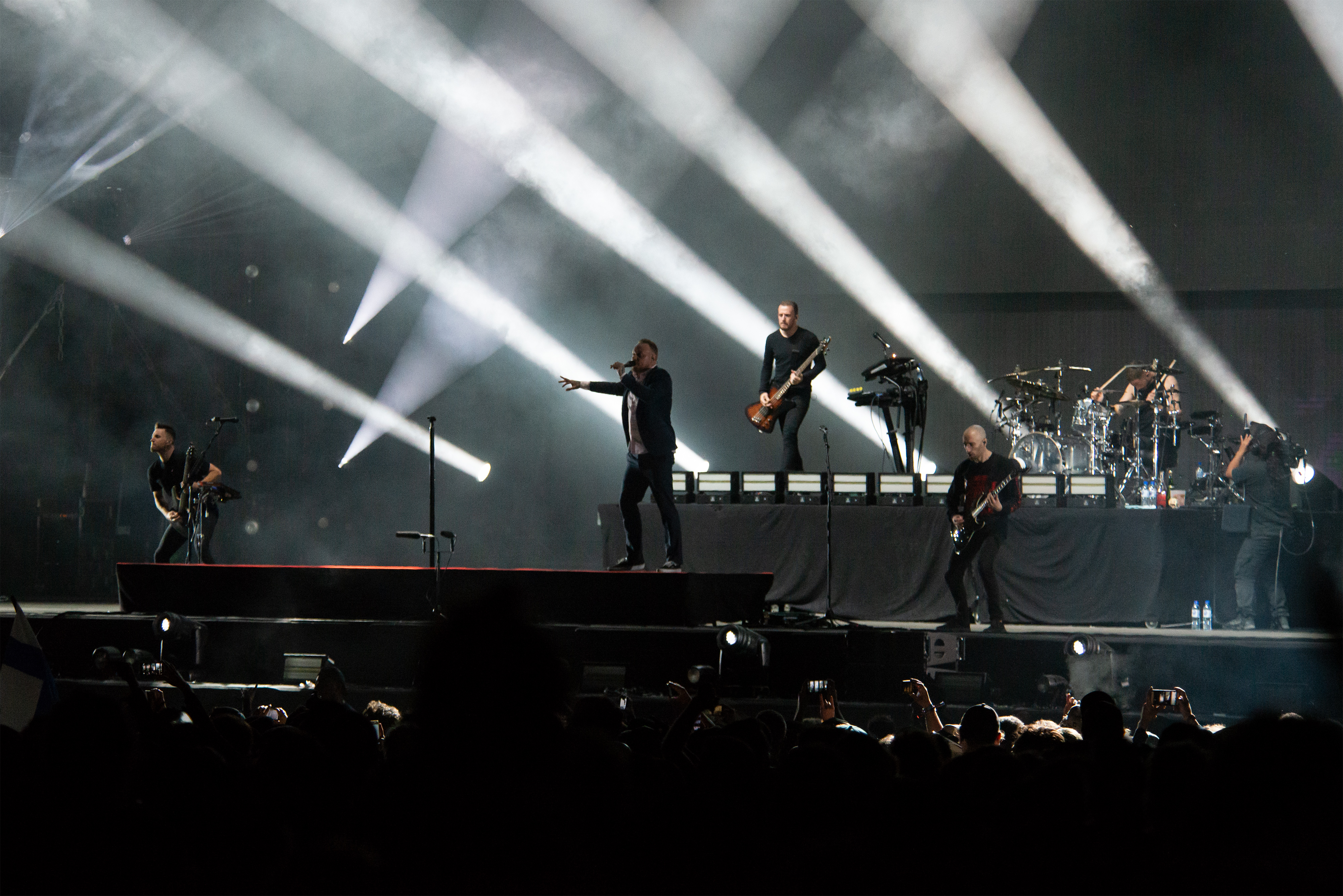
Architects also have eight UK Rock & Metal Albums Chart number ones.

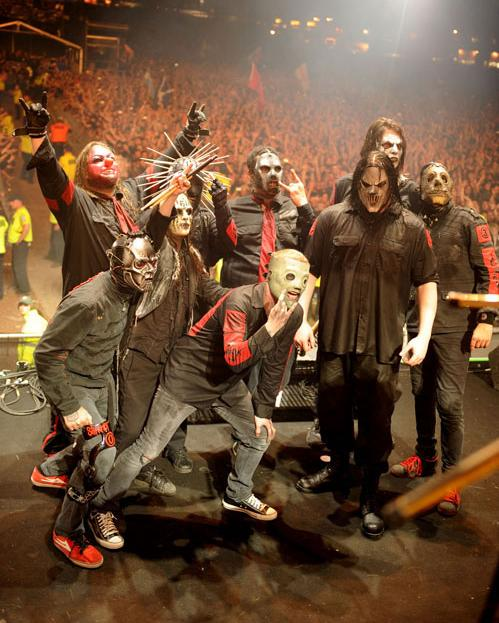
Slipknot have topped the chart with seven albums for a total of 13 weeks.

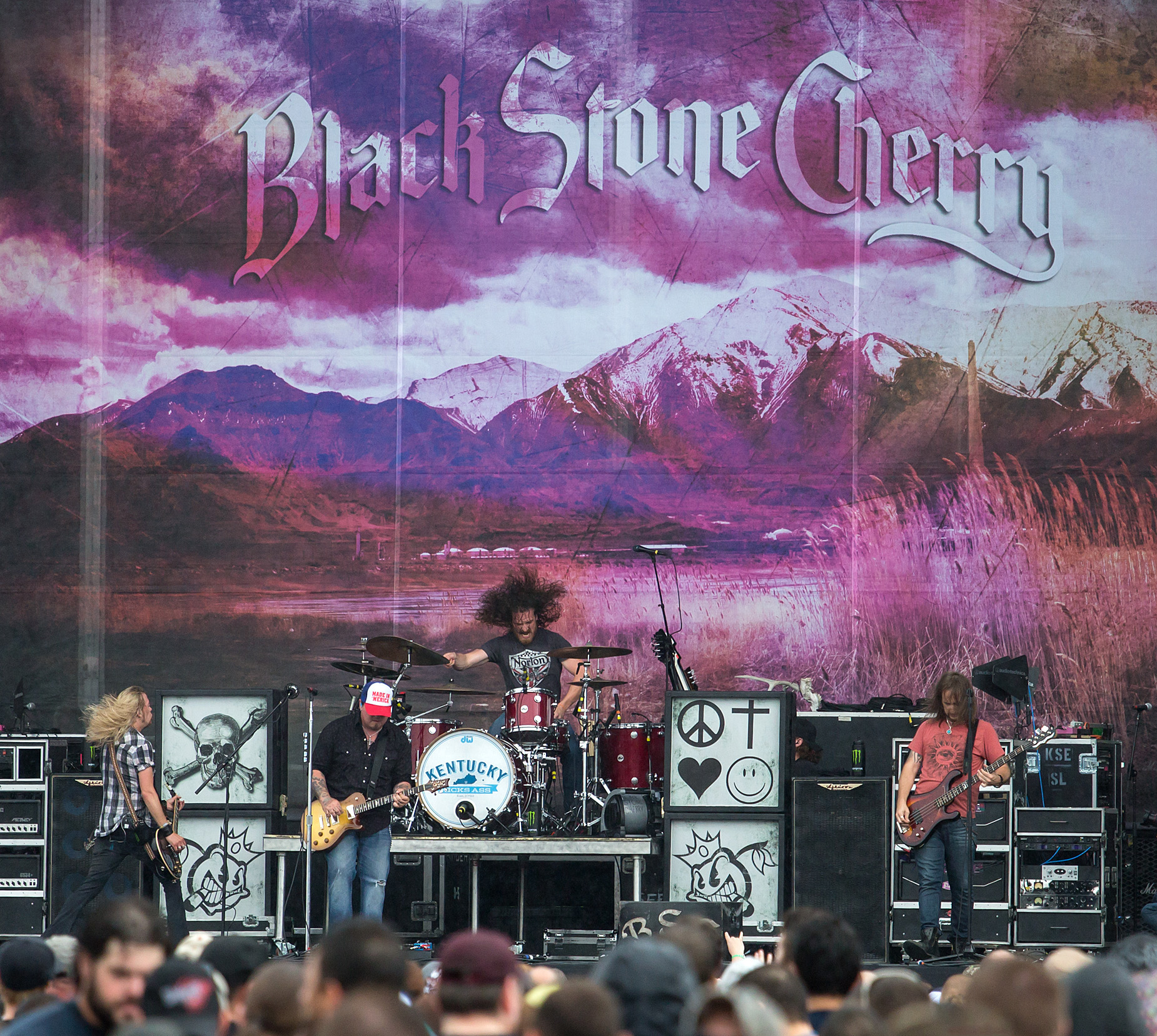
Black Stone Cherry have seven UK Rock & Metal Albums Chart number ones to date.

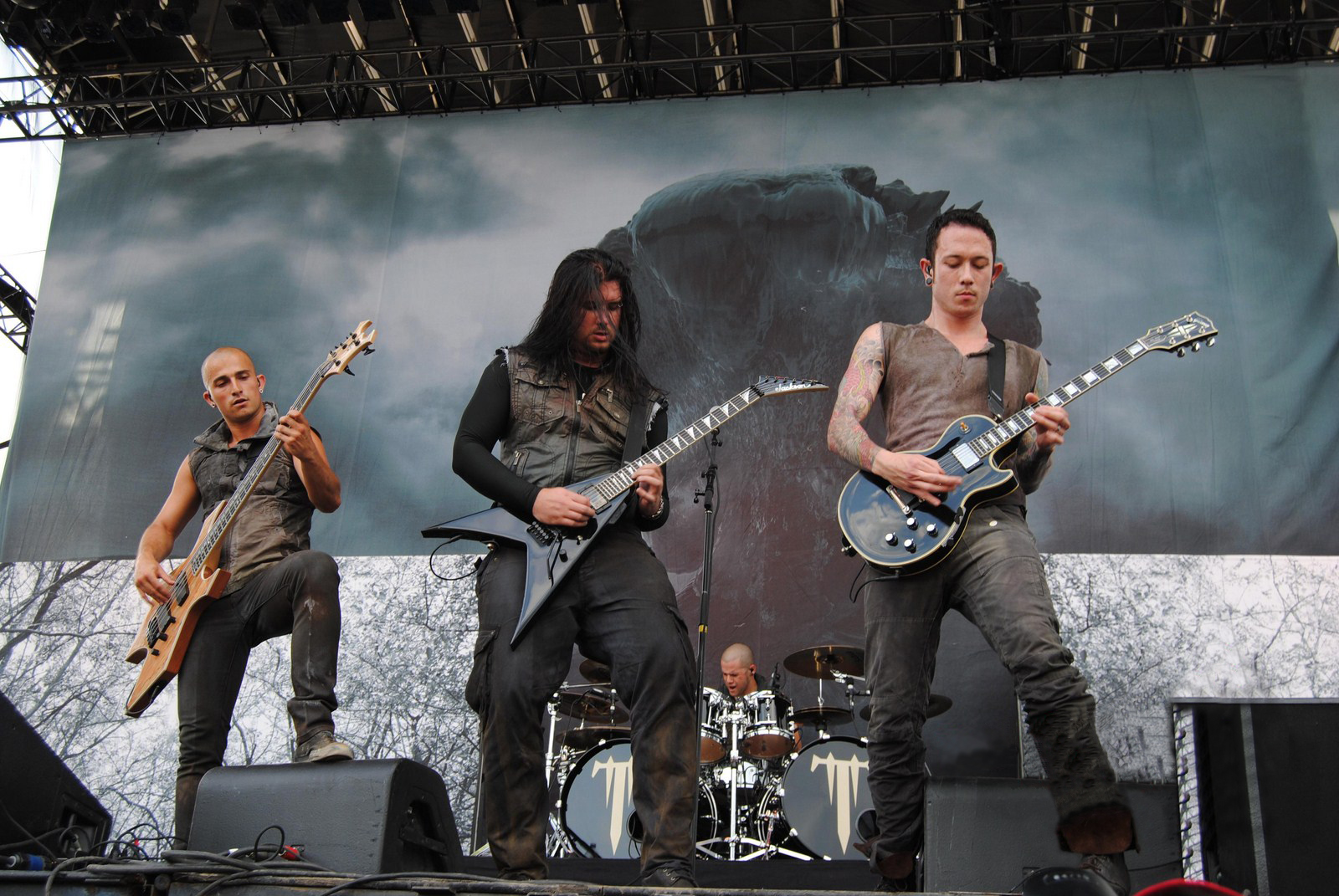
Trivium have topped the album chart seven times.

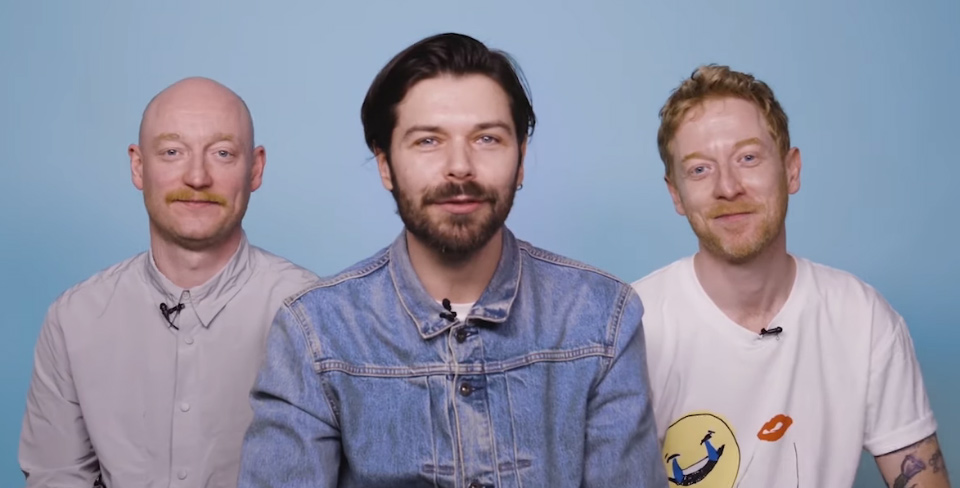
Biffy Clyro have topped the album chart seven times.

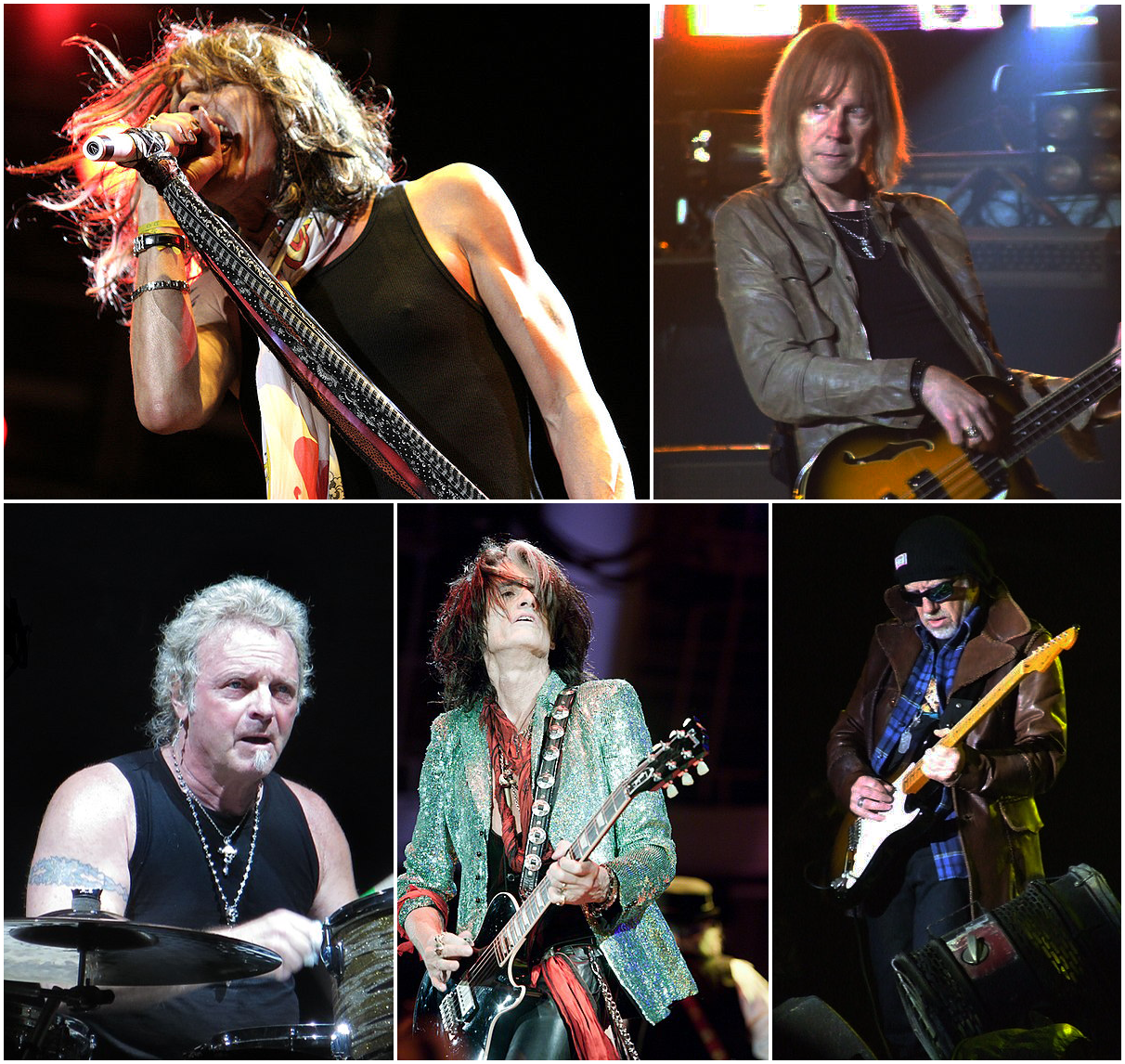
Aerosmith have topped the album chart seven times.

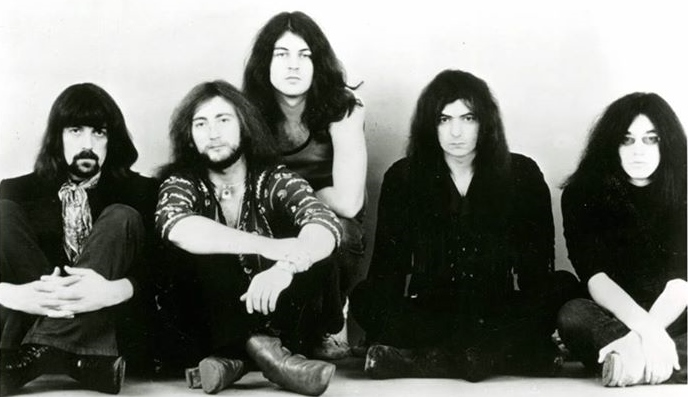
Deep Purple have topped the album chart seven times.

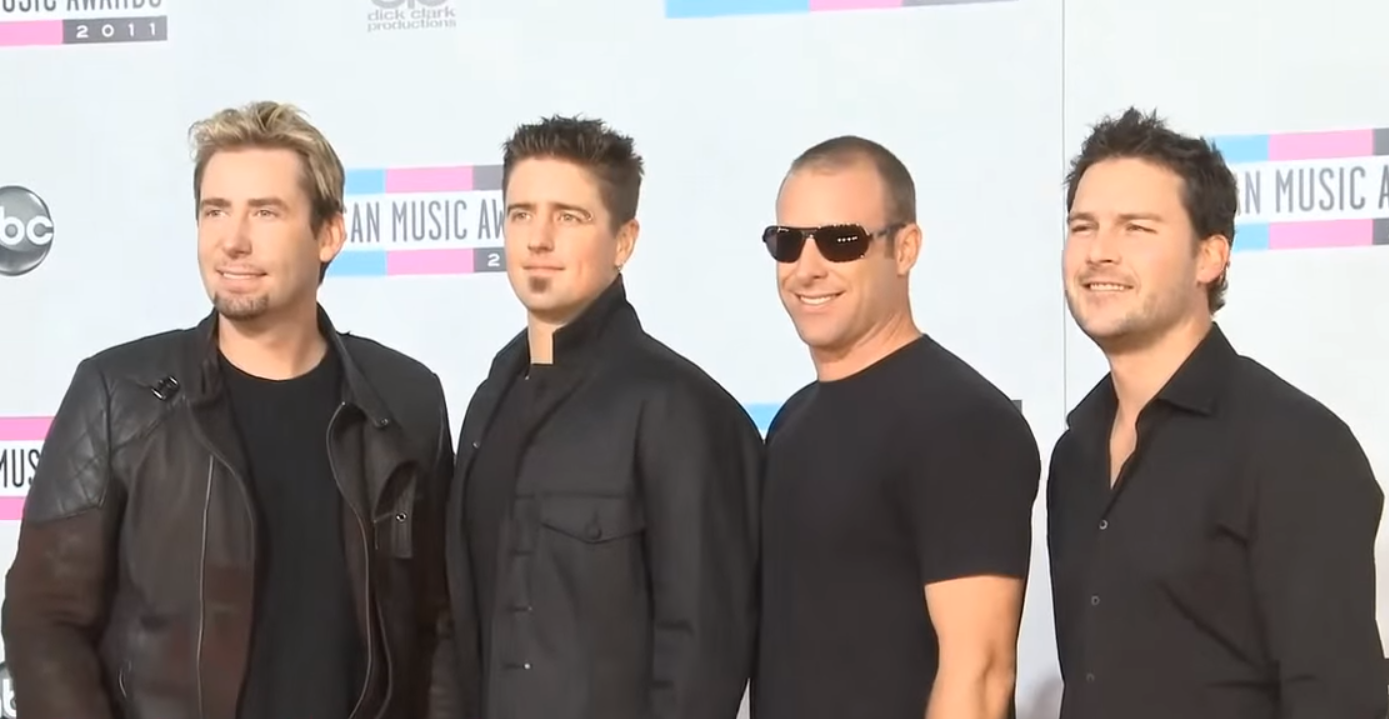
Nickelback have topped the album chart seven times.

The following artists have been credited on at least seven different number one albums, as recognised by the OCC. Appearances on compilation albums featuring various artists are not included.

Key
†	Indicates that the album reached number 1 on the UK Albums Chart

Artist	Number-one albums	Number-one studio albums	Total weeks at number one	Albums	Record label(s)	First reached number one	Weeks at number one	Ref.
Green Day	15	11	76	Dookie	Reprise	18 February 1995	11	
Green Day	15	11	76	Insomniac	Reprise	21 October 1995	2	
Green Day	15	11	76	Nimrod	Reprise	25 October 1997	2	
Green Day	15	11	76	Warning	Reprise	14 October 2000	1	
Green Day	15	11	76	International Superhits!	Reprise	24 November 2001	1	
Green Day	15	11	76	American Idiot †	Reprise	2 October 2004	36	
Green Day	15	11	76	Bullet in a Bible	Reprise	26 November 2005	4	
Green Day	15	11	76	21st Century Breakdown †	Reprise	23 May 2009	11	
Green Day	15	11	76	Awesome as Fuck	Reprise	2 April 2011	1	
Green Day	15	11	76	¡Uno!	Reprise	6 October 2012	1	
Green Day	15	11	76	¡Dos!	Reprise	24 November 2012	1	
Green Day	15	11	76	Revolution Radio †	Reprise	20 October 2016	1	
Green Day	15	11	76	Father of All... †	Reprise	14 February 2020	1	
Green Day	15	11	76	BBC Sessions	Reprise	17 December 2021	1	
Green Day	15	11	76	Saviors	Reprise	26 January 2024	2	
Iron Maiden	14	8	19	Best of the Beast	EMI	5 October 1996	1	
Iron Maiden	14	8	19	Virtual XI	EMI	4 April 1998	2	
Iron Maiden	14	8	19	Brave New World	EMI	10 June 2000	3	
Iron Maiden	14	8	19	Death on the Road	EMI	10 September 2005	1	
Iron Maiden	14	8	19	A Matter of Life and Death	EMI	9 September 2006	1	
Iron Maiden	14	8	19	Somewhere Back in Time	EMI	24 May 2008	2	
Iron Maiden	14	8	19	The Final Frontier †	EMI	28 August 2010	2	
Iron Maiden	14	8	19	The Book of Souls †	Parlophone	17 September 2015	1	
Iron Maiden	14	8	19	The Book of Souls: Live Chapter	Parlophone	30 November 2017	1	
Iron Maiden	14	8	19	The Number of the Beast †	Rhino	29 November 2018	1	
Iron Maiden	14	8	19	Iron Maiden	Rhino	22 October 2020	1	
Iron Maiden	14	8	19	Nights of the Dead	Parlophone	3 December 2020	1	
Iron Maiden	14	8	19	Senjutsu	Parlophone	10 September 2021	1	
Iron Maiden	14	8	19	Live After Death	EMI	5 December 2025	1	
Metallica	12	8	27	Load †	Vertigo	15 June 1996	2	
Metallica	12	8	27	Garage Inc.	Vertigo	5 December 1998	5	
Metallica	12	8	27	St. Anger	Vertigo	14 June 2003	1	
Metallica	12	8	27	Death Magnetic †	Vertigo	20 September 2008	3	
Metallica	12	8	27	Beyond Magnetic	Vertigo	11 February 2012	1	
Metallica	12	8	27	Metallica †	Vertigo	12 July 2014	2	
Metallica	12	8	27	Hardwired... to Self-Destruct	Blackened	1 December 2016	6	
Metallica	12	8	27	Master of Puppets	Vertigo	23 November 2017	1	
Metallica	12	8	27	The $5.98 E.P. - Garage Days Re-Revisited	UMC/Virgin	26 April 2018	1	
Metallica	12	8	27	...And Justice for All	UMC	15 November 2018	1	
Metallica	12	8	27	S&M2	Vertigo	10 September 2020	2	
Metallica	12	8	27	72 Seasons	Vertigo	21 April 2023	2	
Foo Fighters	12	10	84	The Colour and the Shape	Roswell	24 May 1997	4	
Foo Fighters	12	10	84	One by One †	RCA	2 November 2002	3	
Foo Fighters	12	10	84	In Your Honor	RCA	25 June 2005	13	
Foo Fighters	12	10	84	Skin and Bones	RCA	2 December 2006	1	
Foo Fighters	12	10	84	Echoes, Silence, Patience & Grace †	RCA	6 October 2007	8	
Foo Fighters	12	10	84	Greatest Hits	RCA	14 November 2009	22	
Foo Fighters	12	10	84	Wasting Light †	RCA	23 April 2011	16	
Foo Fighters	12	10	84	Sonic Highways	RCA	10 January 2015	1	
Foo Fighters	12	10	84	Concrete and Gold †	Columbia	28 September 2017	11	
Foo Fighters	12	10	84	Medicine at Midnight †	Columbia	18 February 2021	2	
Foo Fighters	12	10	84	But Here We Are †	Columbia	9 June 2023	3	
Foo Fighters	12	10	84	Your Favorite Toy	Columbia	1 May 2026	2	
Led Zeppelin	10	4	35	Remasters	Atlantic	6 September 1997	7	
Led Zeppelin	10	4	35	BBC Sessions	Atlantic	29 November 1997	2	
Led Zeppelin	10	4	35	Mothership	Atlantic	24 November 2007	15	
Led Zeppelin	10	4	35	Celebration Day	Atlantic	1 December 2012	5	
Led Zeppelin	10	4	35	Led Zeppelin	Rhino	14 June 2014	1	
Led Zeppelin	10	4	35	Led Zeppelin IV †	Rhino	8 November 2014	1	
Led Zeppelin	10	4	35	Physical Graffiti †	Rhino	7 March 2015	1	
Led Zeppelin	10	4	35	Presence †	Rhino	13 August 2015	1	
Led Zeppelin	10	4	35	The Complete BBC Sessions	Rhino	29 September 2016	1	
Led Zeppelin	10	4	35	How the West Was Won	Rhino	5 April 2018	1	
Muse	10	7	60	Origin of Symmetry	Mushroom	30 June 2001	4	
Muse	10	7	60	Hullabaloo Soundtrack	Mushroom	13 July 2002	1	
Muse	10	7	60	Absolution †	East West	4 October 2003	3	
Muse	10	7	60	Black Holes and Revelations †	Helium 3 Warner Bros.	15 July 2006	15	
Muse	10	7	60	HAARP	Helium 3 Warner Bros.	29 March 2008	3	
Muse	10	7	60	The Resistance †	Helium 3 Warner Bros.	26 September 2009	16	
Muse	10	7	60	The 2nd Law †	Helium 3 Warner Bros.	13 October 2012	6	
Muse	10	7	60	Live at Rome Olympic Stadium	Helium 3 Warner Bros.	14 December 2013	3	
Muse	10	7	60	Drones †	Helium 3 Warner Bros.	20 June 2015	8	
Muse	10	7	60	The Wow! Signal †	Helium 3 Warner Bros.	3 July 2026	1	
Korn	9	9	10	Follow the Leader	Epic	5 September 1998	2	
Korn	9	9	10	Issues	Epic	27 November 1999	1	
Korn	9	9	10	Untouchables	Epic	22 June 2002	1	
Korn	9	9	10	Untitled Korn album	Virgin	11 August 2007	1	
Korn	9	9	10	Korn III: Remember Who You Are	Roadrunner	24 July 2010	1	
Korn	9	9	10	The Paradigm Shift	Spinefarm	19 October 2013	1	
Korn	9	9	10	The Serenity of Suffering	Roadrunner	3 November 2016	1	
Korn	9	9	10	The Nothing	Roadrunner	26 September 2019	1	
Korn	9	9	10	Requiem	Loma Vista	11 February 222	1	
The Darkness	9	8	29	Permission to Land †	Must Destroy	19 July 2003	21	
The Darkness	9	8	29	One Way Ticket to Hell... and Back	Atlantic	10 December 2005	1	
The Darkness	9	8	29	Hot Cakes	PIAS	1 September 2012	1	
The Darkness	9	8	29	Last of Our Kind	Canary Dwarf	13 June 2015	1	
The Darkness	9	8	29	Pinewood Smile	Cooking Vinyl	19 October 2017	1	
The Darkness	9	8	29	Live at Hammersmith	Cooking Vinyl	28 June 2018	1	
The Darkness	9	8	29	Easter Is Cancelled	Cooking Vinyl	17 October 2019	1	
The Darkness	9	8	29	Motorheart	Cooking Vinyl	26 November 2021	1	
The Darkness	9	8	29	Dreams on Toast	Cooking Vinyl	4 April 2025	1	
Blink-182	8	7	13	Enema of the State	MCA	20 May 2000	3	
Blink-182	8	7	13	Take Off Your Pants and Jacket	MCA	23 June 2001	1	
Blink-182	8	7	13	Blink-182	Geffen	29 November 2003	2	
Blink-182	8	7	13	Greatest Hits	Geffen	12 November 2005	2	
Blink-182	8	7	13	Neighborhoods	Island	8 October 2011	1	
Blink-182	8	7	13	California †	BMG	14 July 2016	2	
Blink-182	8	7	13	Nine	Columbia	3 October 2019	1	
Blink-182	8	7	13	One More Time...	Columbia	27 October 2023	2	
Linkin Park	8	7	56	Hybrid Theory	Warner Bros.	14 April 2001	21	
Linkin Park	8	7	56	Meteora †	Warner Bros.	5 April 2003	6	
Linkin Park	8	7	56	Minutes to Midnight †	Warner Bros.	26 May 2007	6	
Linkin Park	8	7	56	A Thousand Suns	Warner Bros.	25 September 2010	8	
Linkin Park	8	7	56	Living Things †	Warner Bros.	7 July 2012	4	
Linkin Park	8	7	56	The Hunting Party	Warner Bros.	28 June 2014	2	
Linkin Park	8	7	56	One More Light Live	Warner Bros.	28 December 2017	1	
Linkin Park	8	7	56	From Zero †	Warner Bros.	22 November 2024	8	
Pink Floyd	8	5	48	The Endless River	Rhino	22 November 2014	7	
Pink Floyd	8	5	48	The Early Years 1965–1972	Rhino	24 November 206	1	
Pink Floyd	8	5	48	The Dark Side of the Moon	Rhino	20 November 2018	32	
Pink Floyd	8	5	48	The Division Bell	Rhino	20 June 2019	1	
Pink Floyd	8	5	48	Transmissions + 1969	Rhino	2 April 2020	1	
Pink Floyd	8	5	48	Animals	Rhino	23 September 2022	1	
Pink Floyd	8	5	48	Pink Floyd at Pompeii – MCMLXXII	Sony	9 May 2025	2	
Pink Floyd	8	5	48	Wish You Were Here	Harvest	19 December 2025	4	
Architects	8	8	8	The Here and Now	Century Media	5 February 2011	1	
Architects	8	8	8	Daybreaker	Century Media	9 June 2012	1	
Architects	8	8	8	Lost Forever // Lost Together	Epitaph	22 March 2014	1	
Architects	8	8	8	All Our Gods Have Abandoned Us	Epitaph	9 June 2016	1	
Architects	8	8	8	Holy Hell	Epitaph	22 November 2018	1	
Architects	8	8	8	For Those That Wish to Exist †	Epitaph	5 March 2021	1	
Architects	8	8	8	The Classic Symptoms of a Broken Spirit	Epitaph	28 October 2022	1	
Architects	8	8	8	The Sky, the Earth & All Between	Epitaph	7 March 2025	1	
Slipknot	7	7	14	Iowa †	Roadrunner	2 September 2001	2	
Slipknot	7	7	14	Vol. 3: (The Subliminal Verses)	Roadrunner	5 June 2004	2	
Slipknot	7	7	14	All Hope Is Gone	Roadrunner	6 September 2008	2	
Slipknot	7	7	14	.5: The Gray Chapter	Roadrunner	1 November 2014	2	
Slipknot	7	7	14	We Are Not Your Kind †	Roadrunner	22 August 2019	3	
Slipknot	7	7	14	Slipknot	Roadrunner	22 April 2022	2	
Slipknot	7	7	14	The End, So Far †	Roadrunner	7 October 2022	1	
Black Stone Cherry	7	6	8	Folklore and Superstition	Roadrunner	30 August 2008	1	
Black Stone Cherry	7	6	8	Between the Devil & the Deep Blue Sea	Roadrunner	11 June 2011	1	
Black Stone Cherry	7	6	8	Magic Mountain	Roadrunner	17 May 2014	2	
Black Stone Cherry	7	6	8	Kentucky	Mascot	14 April 2016	1	
Black Stone Cherry	7	6	8	Family Tree	Mascot	3 May 2018	1	
Black Stone Cherry	7	6	8	Black to Blues Vol. 2	Mascot	14 November 2019	1	
Black Stone Cherry	7	6	8	The Human Condition	Mascot	12 November 2020	1	
Trivium	7	7	7	Ascendancy	Roadrunner	11 March 2006	1	
Trivium	7	7	7	The Crusade	Roadrunner	21 October 2006	1	
Trivium	7	7	7	Shogun	Roadrunner	11 October 2008	1	
Trivium	7	7	7	In Waves	Roadrunner	20 August 2011	1	
Trivium	7	7	7	The Sin and the Sentence	Roadrunner	2 November 2017	1	
Trivium	7	7	7	What the Dead Men Say	Roadrunner	7 May 2020	1	
Trivium	7	7	7	In the Court of the Dragon	Roadrunner	15 October 2021	1	
Biffy Clyro	7	4	16	Revolutions: Live at Wembley	14th Floor Records	9 July 2011	1	
Biffy Clyro	7	4	16	Opposites	14th Floor Records	13 February 2013	6	
Biffy Clyro	7	4	16	Similarities	14th Floor Records	20 August 2014	1	
Biffy Clyro	7	4	16	Ellipsis	14th Floor Records	21 July 2016	5	
Biffy Clyro	7	4	16	Balance, Not Symmetry	14th Floor Records	2 August 2019	1	
Biffy Clyro	7	4	16	The Myth of the Happily Ever After	14th Floor Records	4 November 2021	1	
Biffy Clyro	7	4	16	Futique	Warner	26 September 2025	1	
Aerosmith	7	3	10	Nine Lives	Columbia	22 March 1997	1	
Aerosmith	7	3	10	A Little South of Sanity	Geffen	31 October 1998	3	
Aerosmith	7	3	10	Just Push Play	Columbia	24 March 2001	1	
Aerosmith	7	3	10	The Very Best Of	Geffen/Columbia	11 November 2006	2	
Aerosmith	7	3	10	Music from Another Dimension!	Columbia	17 November 2012	1	
Aerosmith	7	3	10	Greatest Hits	Capitol	31 August 2023	1	
Aerosmith	7	3	10	One More Time	Island	4 December 2025	1	
Deep Purple	7	5	9	30: Very Best of Deep Purple	EMI	24 October 1998	1	
Deep Purple	7	5	9	In Concert with The London Symphony Orchestra	Eagle	5 February 2000	1	
Deep Purple	7	5	9	Now What?!	EarMusic	11 May 2013	1	
Deep Purple	7	5	9	Infinite	EarMusic	20 April 2017	2	
Deep Purple	7	5	9	Whoosh!	EarMusic	20 August 2020	2	
Deep Purple	7	5	9	Turning to Crime	EarMusic	3 December 2021	1	
Deep Purple	7	5	9	Splat!	EarMusic	16 July 2026	1	
Nickelback	7	6	46	Silver Side Up	Roadrunner	6 October 2001	16	
Nickelback	7	6	46	All The Right Reasons	Roadrunner	15 October 2005	18	
Nickelback	7	6	46	Dark Horse	Roadrunner	29 November 2008	2	
Nickelback	7	6	46	Here and Now	Roadrunner	3 December 2011	5	
Nickelback	7	6	46	The Best of Nickelback Volume 1	Roadrunner	16 November 2013	2	
Nickelback	7	6	46	Get Rollin'	BMG	1 December 2022	2	
Nickelback	7	6	46	Everything Under the Sun	Nickelback	12 November 2026	1	

== See also ==
- List of artists by number of UK Rock & Metal Singles Chart number ones
- List of artists by number of UK Albums Chart number ones
- List of artists by number of UK Singles Chart number ones
