= Movie (album) =

Studio album by Mod Sun
- Released: March 10, 2017
- Genre: Hip hop
- Length: 39:25
- Label: Rostrum
- Producer: Bobby Johnson; Frank Dukes; Arthur McArthur; Michael Keenan; Mike Dupree; Don Cannon; Matt Friedman

Mod Sun chronology
Look Up (2015)	Movie (2017)	BB (2017)

Movie is the second studio album by American recording artist Mod Sun. It was released on March 10, 2017, by Rostrum Records. The album was produced by Don Cannon, Frank Dukes, Mike Dupree, Matt Friedman, Bobby Johnson, Michael Keenan and Arthur McArthur.

== Background and release ==
In summer 2016, Mod Sun started working on Movie stating that "there was a totally different basis to this album" since all of the received instrumentals were from other producers, while all of the instrumentals on Look Up were created by him. In an interview with St. Louis Magazine's Lance Jordan, Mod Sun revealed that he had recorded over 300 songs for the album and that his team at Rostrum Records helped him with narrowing down the track listing to eleven songs. Movie was released worldwide on March 10, 2017, by Rostrum Records.

== Critical reception ==
Professional ratings
Review scores
Source	Rating
Substream Magazine	5/5 stars
HipHopDX	3.4/5 stars

Movie garnered generally positive reviews from music critics. James Shotwell of Substream Magazine stated that Movie is "both intellectually stimulating and unabashedly fun. The so-called inventor of the hippie-hop movement has graduated into the ranks of today’s best rap notables without the budget or major label backing typically required to make such acts a household name." HipHopDX's Aaron McKrell gave the album a positive review stating that "Sun doesn’t offer much creativity in the worn themes of pouring up, flossing, and the opposite sex, he does show versatility in his style."

== Track listing ==
Credits adapted from Amazon meta data.

No.	Title	Writer(s)	Producer(s)	Length
1.	"Previews"	Richard Baker; Adrian Bruesch; Adam Feeney; Derek "Mod Sun" Smith	Bobby Johnson; Frank Dukes	1:12
2.	"We Do This Shit" (featuring Dej Loaf)	Baker; Feeney; Smith; Deja Trimble	Johnson	3:52
3.	"She Just Wanna Dance"	Jeremy McArthur; Smith	Arthur McArthur	2:50
4.	"You Are" (featuring Mansionz)	Matt Musto; Michael Keenan; Mike Posner; Smith	Keenan	3:55
5.	"Beautiful Problem" (featuring Gnash & Maty Noyes)	Garrett Nash; McArthur; Jon Bellion; Smith	McArthur	4:22
6.	"Two"	Mike Dupree; Smith	Dupree	2:48
7.	"WWYGADT"	Donald Cannon; Smith	Cannon	3:53
8.	"Smokin' What I'm Smokin' On" (featuring DRAM & Rich the Kid)	Cannon; Dimitri Roger; Robert Mandell; Shelley Smith; Smith	Cannon	4:14
9.	"Spent All My Money..." (featuring blackbear)	Bruesch; Musto; Smith	Johnson	3:43
10.	"Make Somethin' of Yourself"	McArthur; Smith	McArthur	3:49
11.	"The End or Start Again?"	McArthur; Matt Friedman; Smith	Friedman; McArthur	4:47
Total length:				39:25

== Charts ==
Chart (2017)	Peak position
US Independent Albums (Billboard)	40
US Heatseekers Albums (Billboard)	16

== Release history ==
Country	Date	Format	Label	Ref.
Various	March 10, 2017	CD; digital download; streaming	Rostrum	
