= Mod Sun =

American musician (born 1987)

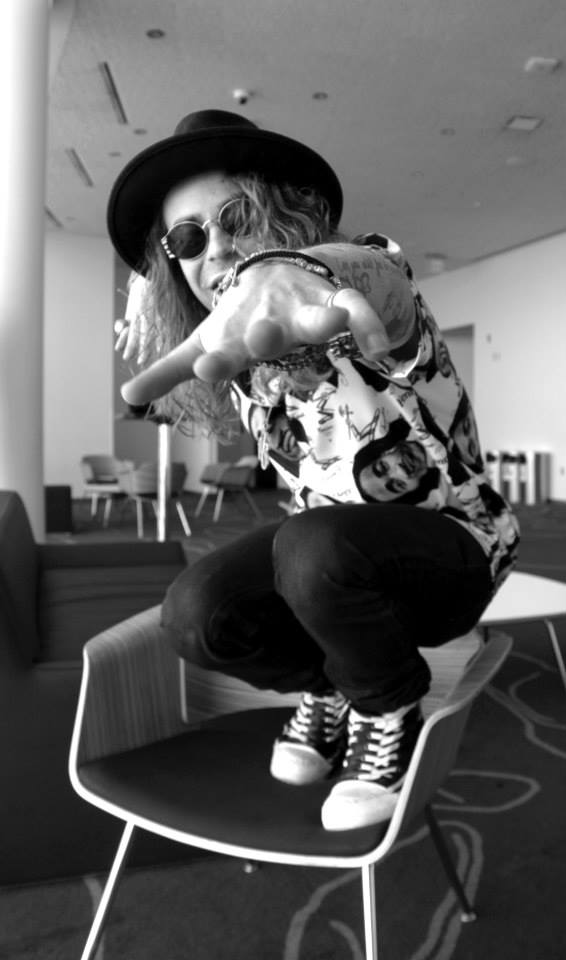
- Mod Sun in 2015

Background information
- Also known as: Dylan Smith
- Born: Derek Ryan Smith; March 10, 1987 (age 39); Bloomington, Minnesota, U.S.
- Education: Jefferson High School
- Genres: Hip hop; post-hardcore; pop-punk; alternative hip hop
- Occupations: Singer; rapper; songwriter; musician
- Instruments: Vocals; drums
- Years active: 2004–present
- Labels: New Hippys; Big Noise; Rostrum
- Formerly of: Scary Kids Scaring Kids; Four Letter Lie; The Semester
- Website: modsunmusic.com

Derek Ryan Smith (born March 10, 1987), known professionally as Mod Sun (Note: Smith has said that "Mod Sun" is both an abbreviation of Modern Sunshine and an acronym standing for Movement on Dreams, Stand under None) (stylized as MOD SUN or MODSUN), is an American singer, songwriter, rapper and musician from Bloomington, Minnesota. He has released five solo studio albums, three EPs, and six mixtapes. He is also a member of the alternative hip hop duo Hotel Motel.

Beginning his musical career by playing drums in pop punk band the Semester and post-hardcore groups Four Letter Lie and Scary Kids Scaring Kids, Smith began a solo rap career in 2009 under the name Mod Sun. The release of his fourth solo studio album Internet Killed The Rockstar saw a stylistic shift back to pop punk. His fifth studio album God Save the Teen, released in 2023, followed in its footsteps.

== Early life ==
Derek Ryan Smith was born on March 10, 1987, in Bloomington, Minnesota. Later his father left for California and his parents divorced, after which Smith spent some time living with his father in Long Beach, California. From age five to 10, he moved frequently due to his mother having to relocate for various jobs. He spent much of his time growing up on a farm in Corcoran, Minnesota. Smith's father lived next door to Bud Gaugh, drummer of Sublime, who influenced him to become involved in music.

In his teens, Smith began attending concerts in his local pop punk scene. He became an increasingly prominent figure in the scene through his mother encouraging him to attend concerts and ask the touring band members whether they wanted to stay the night at their house. In the following years, Smith and other local bands and musicians in the scene became increasingly interested in fashion and influenced by New Jersey and Drive-Thru Records emo bands, leading to them becoming members of the scene subculture. In eighth grade, he designed merchandise for bands.

== Music career ==
=== 2004–2010: Career beginnings ===
Smith's first band was the pop punk band Sideline Heroes. He then began playing drums for local pop punk band the Semester in his sophomore year of high school. He spent the following four years in the band, before being kicked out three months after his graduation. In 2005, he became a member of the post-hardcore band Four Letter Lie. In 2009, he left the band to pursue his passion in rap and Mod Sun endeavours. He went on to be a drum tech for Scary Kids Scaring Kids. He was eventually asked to be the drummer for Scary Kids Scaring Kids, which he accepted under the condition that he could open for the band on tour as a solo artist.

=== 2011–2019: Solo career and Look Up, Movie and BB ===
Mod Sun has released five mixtapes and three EPs throughout his solo career. His style of music has been described as "hippy hop".

Mod Sun's debut album, Look Up, was released on March 10, 2015, through Rostrum Records. It peaked at #1 on the Billboard Top Heatseekers chart.

On March 10, 2017, his second studio album, Movie, was released, also through Rostrum Records. It peaked at #16 on the Billboard Top Heatseekers chart.

His third studio album BB was released on November 10, 2017, and spawned the single "#noshirton".

=== 2020–2022: Switch to pop punk and Internet Killed the Rockstar ===
In early 2020, Mod Sun announced he had started working on his forthcoming fourth studio album. Its lead single "Karma" was released on October 30, 2020. The accompanying music video was released three weeks later on November 16, 2020, and was directed by Machine Gun Kelly. The song "Bones" was released as the album's second single on November 27, 2020. The music video for "Bones" was released on December 21, 2020, via Mod Sun's official YouTube channel and was directed by Charlie Zwick. The album's third single, "Flames", was a collaboration with Avril Lavigne. On January 18, 2021, Downfalls High, a film Smith co-directed with Machine Gun Kelly was released. On 25 January, 2021 Mod Sun officially announced the album title, Internet Killed the Rockstar, and its release date, February 12, 2021.

On March 12, 2021, he released the single "Heavy" featuring blackbear. The same month he signed a long-term deal with Big Noise.

On August 26, 2021, it was announced that he would star in and co–direct the film Good Mourning With A U, alongside Machine Gun Kelly, Dove Cameron, Megan Fox and Becky G. The film was later retitled to simply Good Mourning, and was released on April 20, 2022.

On May 7, 2021, a deluxe version of Internet Killed the Rockstar was released. It features five new tracks as well as acoustic versions of "Karma" and "Flames" and a piano version of "Bones".

=== 2022–present: God Save the Teen ===
On February 18, 2022, Mod Sun released a documentary about his life entitled Remember Me Just Like This on his YouTube channel. The documentary included a teaser for his next single "Rich Kids Ruin Everything", which was released on March 11, 2022.

On February 25, 2022, Avril Lavigne's seventh studio album Love Sux was released. Mod Sun produced, provided drums for, and cowrote every song on the album (with the exception of "Dare to Love Me" and "Break of a Heartache", which Lavigne wrote alone).

On June 10, 2022, he released the single "Perfectly Imperfect".

On August 19, 2022, he released the single "Battle Scars".

In November 2022, Mod Sun announced the title for his upcoming fifth studio album: God Save the Teen. The album was revealed to be released in early 2023, though an exact release date was yet to be announced.

On December 9, 2022, he released the single "Sexoxo" featuring Charlotte Sands.

On January 17, 2023, he revealed the album artwork and tracklist for his fifth studio album God Save the Teen, and announced that it would be released on February 3. The tracklist contained twelve new songs, including a cover of the song "Iris" by The Goo Goo Dolls.

On February 3, 2023, God Save the Teen was released.

== Personal life ==
Beginning in October 2018, Smith was in a polyamorous relationship with internet personality Tana Mongeau and actress Bella Thorne. After the throuple's breakup, he began a monogamous relationship with Thorne. Smith and Thorne became engaged, got married and then subsequently divorced, all within 15 months, though the marriage was not official, as they had exchanged vows with no legal paperwork present. In early 2020, he began a monogamous relationship with Mongeau, but they broke up by the end of the year.

In early adulthood, Mod Sun was a heavy drug user, but quit in 2019 after he overdosed on a number of drugs and almost died. According to a 2023 interview with Spin magazine, Sun admitted to feeling guilty about his drug use and said, "One thing that'll make everything stop for you in life is walking around carrying shame. Every time I did a line of cocaine, I felt absolute shame. I knew in my heart I was like, 'This is going to kill me.' I had to eliminate that. It's like...I [had] my suitcase of trauma that I was carrying around every single day, and I traded that in for a toolbox to give me the tools to really bring my life to where I wanted to go."

From 2021 to 2023, he was in a relationship with Canadian musician Avril Lavigne. They later got engaged in Paris in April 2022, but subsequently broke off the engagement on February 21, 2023. A spokesperson for Sun initially appeared surprised, saying "they were together and engaged as of 3 days ago when he left for tour so if anything has changed that's news to him." Lavigne was photographed hugging rapper Tyga after the split, sparking rumors that the two were dating. On February 28, Sun confirmed the split, saying "In 1 week my entire life completely changed… I just know there's a plan for it all… I'll keep my head up + always listen to my heart, even when it feels broken. Being surrounded by love every night on tour has been an absolute blessing. I have the best friends in the entire world, thanks for always having my back. See you on stage."

== Discography ==
=== Studio albums ===
List of albums with selected chart positions and certifications
Title	Details	Peak chart positions				
Title	Details	US	US Alt.	US R&B/ HH	US Heat	US Ind.
Look Up	Released: March 10, 2015; Label: Rostrum; Format: CD, Vinyl, digital download	120	6	13	1	7
Movie	Released: March 10, 2017; Label: Rostrum; Format: CD, Vinyl, digital download	—	—	—	16	40
BB	Released: November 10, 2017; Label: Rostrum; Format: Digital download	—	—	—	—	—
Internet Killed the Rockstar	Released: February 12, 2021; Label: New Hippys/Big Noise; Format: CD, Vinyl, digital download	—	—	—	21	—
God Save the Teen	Released: February 3, 2023; Label: New Hippys/Big Noise; Format: CD, Vinyl, digital download	—	—	—	—	—

=== Extended plays ===
Title	Details
The Hippy Hop EP	Released: January 15, 2010; Label: Self-released; Format: Digital download
In MOD We Trust	Released: February 8, 2011; Label: New Hippys; Format: Digital download
Happy as Fuck	Released: June 13, 2012; Label: Bananabeat Records; Format: Digital download

=== Mixtapes ===
- 2009: I'll Buy Myself
- 2009: Let Ya Teeth Show
- 2009: How to Make a MOD SUN
- 2011: Health, Wealth, Success, & Happiness
- 2011: Blazed by the Bell
- 2012: First Take

=== Singles ===
Title	Year	Peak chart positions					Album
Title	Year	US Alt.	US Rock	CAN Dig.	NZ Hot	UK Down.	Album
"Need That"	2010	—	—	—	—	—	In MOD We Trust
"Paradisity"	2011	—	—	—	—	—	In MOD We Trust
"All Night, Every Night" (with The Ready Set)	2012	—	—	—	—	—	Non-album singles
"Save" (with Ab-Soul, Rich Hil and Metasota	2012	—	—	—	—	—	Non-album singles
"My Hippy"	2013	—	—	—	—	—	Look Up
"1970"	2014	—	—	—	—	—	Look Up
"Howlin' at the Moon"	2015	—	—	—	—	—	Look Up
"Pound on the Way"	2015	—	—	—	—	—	Non-album single
"We Do This Shit" (with DeJ Loaf)	2016	—	—	—	—	—	Movie
"Two"	2017	—	—	—	—	—	Movie
"Beautiful Problem" (with gnash & Maty Noyes)	2017	—	—	—	—	—	Movie
happyBB"	2017	—	—	—	—	—	BB
"#noshirton"	2017	—	—	—	—	—	BB
"poundzzzzzz"	2017	—	—	—	—	—	BB
"address on the internet"	2017	—	—	—	—	—	BB
"Runaway"	2018	—	—	—	—	—	Non-album singles
"Burning Up"	2018	—	—	—	—	—	Non-album singles
"Psycho Smile"	2019	—	—	—	—	—	Non-album singles
"Tell Me All Your Secrets"	2019	—	—	—	—	—	Non-album singles
"Blue Cheese"	2019	—	—	—	—	—	Non-album singles
"Selfish"	2019	—	—	—	—	—	Non-album singles
"Shoulder"	2019	—	—	—	—	—	Non-album singles
"Amen"	2019	—	—	—	—	—	Non-album singles
"Tipi/2005 Flex Up"	2019	—	—	—	—	—	Non-album singles
"I Remember Way Too Much"	2019	—	—	—	—	—	Non-album singles
"Uppers & Downers"	2019	—	—	—	—	—	Non-album singles
"Stay Away" (featuring Machine Gun Kelly)	2020	—	—	—	27	—	Non-album singles
"Karma"	2020	—	—	—	—	—	Internet Killed the Rockstar
"Bones"	2020	—	—	—	—	—	Internet Killed the Rockstar
"Flames" (featuring Avril Lavigne)	2021	21	35	50	40	74	Internet Killed the Rockstar
"Heavy" (with blackbear)	2021	—	—	—	—	—	Internet Killed the Rockstar (Deluxe)
"Down" (featuring Travis Barker)	2021	—	—	—	—	—	Non-album singles
"Rich Kids Ruin Everything"	2022	—	—	—	—	—	Non-album singles
"Perfectly Imperfect"	2022	—	—	—	—	—	Non-album singles
"Battle Scars"	2022	—	—	—	—	—	Non-album singles
"Sexoxo" (featuring Charlotte Sands)	2022	—	—	—	—	—	Non-album singles
"Strangers"	2023	—	—	—	—	—	Non-album singles
"Sunshine"	2024	—	—	—	—	—	Non-album singles
"Hotel Lights"	2024	24	—	—	—	—	
"—" denotes a recording that did not chart or was not released.

=== Featured singles ===
- 2011: "Good Times" by Swimming With Dolphins
- 2012: "I Think It's Hot" by Def Gone Graphic
- 2012: "Catch Me Smilin" by Joe B.
- 2013: "Right Now" by Goody
- 2013: "Get Loco" by T.T.
- 2013: "The Tortoise and the Hare" by The Weekend Hustler
- 2013: "Let It Bang" by Jbre & Dougie Kent
- 2014: "All I Need Is Sunshine" by The Gooneez & Sidereal
- 2014: "Raw Cypher" by Dizzy Wright, Like, and Sir Michael Rocks
- 2015: "me you & the moon" by Call Me Karizma
- 2016: "Sublime" by Machine Gun Kelly
- 2018: ":)" by Lil Phag and Dr. Woke
- 2020: "Bullets in the Dark" by No Love for the Middle Child
- 2021: "0X1=Lovesong (I Know I Love You)" by Tomorrow X Together
- 2021: "Ocean of Embers"
- 2021: "Empty Bottles" by Bryce Vine
- 2021: "Broken in All the Right Places" by Lost Kings
- 2022: "Timebomb" by Two Friends
- 2022: "Movie Star" by Steve Aoki
- 2022: “Escape From my Reality” by Scary Kids Scaring Kids
- 2023: "Still the Dumb One" by Pardyalone
- 2023: "Blame Me for Everything" by Lil Lotus
- 2023: "Figure Me Out" by weknewnothing
- 2024: "Flyin' Pass" (Remix) by Caldwell
- 2024: "I’d Rather Overdose" by Honestav
- 2024: "Me & My Friends" by Audio Chateau
- 2025: "Lowlife" by Dizzyisdead
- 2025: "Own Me" by The Haunt

== Books ==
=== Non-fiction books ===
- 2012: Did I Ever Wake Up?

=== Poetry books ===
- 2015: My Dear Pink
- 2018: So Long Los Angeles

=== Journals ===
- 2015: "Happy to Be Here"
- 2016: "Happy to Be Here Pt. 2"
- 2019: "Happy to Be Here Pt. 3"

== Filmography ==
=== Film ===
Year	Title	Role	Notes	Ref.
2021	Bashira	Club Owner		
2022	Measure of Revenge	Lord MacBeth		
2022	Good Mourning	Dylan	Also director, writer, and producer Golden Raspberry Award for Worst Director Nominated – Golden Raspberry Award for Worst Picture; Nominated - Golden Raspberry Award for Worst Supporting Actor; Nominated - Golden Raspberry Award for Worst Screenplay; Nominated - Golden Raspberry Award for Worst Screen Combo	

=== Television ===
Year	Title	Role	Notes	Ref.
2018	Cooking on High	Himself	2 episodes	
2021	Ridiculousness	Himself	Episode: "Mod Sun"	

=== Internet ===
Year	Title	Role	Notes	Ref.
2017	Album	Himself	credited as writer	
2019	I Remember Way Too Much	Himself		
2021	Downfalls High		Director, writer, cameo	
2022	Remember Me Just Like This	Himself	Subject of documentary	

=== Music videos ===
List of music videos directed, showing year released
Year	Title	Artist	Ref.
2014	"Sail"	Machine Gun Kelly	
2016	"All Night Long"	Machine Gun Kelly	
2016	"Shoot 'Em Down" (feat. Machine Gun Kelly & Blackbear)	Mod Sun	
2017	"Sublime remiXX"	Machine Gun Kelly	
2020	"Concert for Aliens"	Machine Gun Kelly	
2020	"Drunk Face"	Machine Gun Kelly	
2021	"Flames" (feat. Avril Lavigne)	Mod Sun	
2021	"Amnesia"	Mod Sun	
2021	"Bite Me" (Acoustic Version)	Avril Lavigne	
2021	"Down" (feat. Travis Barker)	Mod Sun	
2022	“Rich Kids Ruin Everything"	Mod Sun	
2024	"Just My Type"	Palaye Royale	
