= Internet Killed the Rockstar =

Studio album by Mod Sun
- Released: February 12, 2021
- Studio: Foxy Studios, Los Angeles, U.S.
- Genre: Pop-punk
- Length: 30:36
- Label: Big Noise
- Producer: John Feldmann

Mod Sun chronology
BB (2017)	Internet Killed the Rockstar (2021)	God Save the Teen (2023)

Singles from Internet Killed the Rockstar
- 1. "Karma" Released: October 30, 2020; 2. "Bones" Released: November 27, 2020; 3. "Flames" Released: January 8, 2021

Internet Killed the Rockstar is the fourth studio album by American musician Mod Sun. It was released on February 12, 2021, by Big Noise Music Group. Produced by John Feldmann, the album marks a departure from Mod Sun's hip hop sound in favor of pop-punk. The album was promoted with three singles: "Karma", "Bones" and "Flames", the latter of which is a collaboration with Canadian singer-songwriter Avril Lavigne.

Internet Killed the Rockstar received generally positive reviews upon its release, with music critics citing the album as a positive contribution to the resurgence of pop punk music in the 2020s. A deluxe edition of the album featuring eight additional songs was released on May 7, 2021. "Heavy", a collaboration with Blackbear, and an acoustic version of "Flames" were released in the lead up to the deluxe edition's release.

== Background ==
Derek Smith began his musical career playing drums in a number of pop punk and post-hardcore scene bands, including the Semester, Four Letter Lie and Scary Kids Scaring Kids. After the 2010 breakup of Scary Kids Scaring Kids, he began a solo rap career under the name Mod Sun, playing a style of hip hop that he referred to as "hippie hop". He released five mixtapes and three albums in the genre.

Writing for the album began in 2016, with 1,300 songs being written for the album. The album was recorded and produced by John Feldmann. "Karma" was written in the album's first day recording, based on a chorus that Smith had already written. "Bones" was written and recorded later on in the same day based on a riff that Feldmann had written. "Flames" went through a number of rewrites, which concluded after Smith sent the song to Avril Lavigne, who said that she loved the song and that she wanted to appear on it. "Betterman" was influenced by the instrumentals of the Cure and the vocals of the Foo Fighters. "Prayer" sees Smith looking back on his life, drug addiction and history of oversharing with the public, and how he believes beginning to pray improved him. "TwentyNumb" is based around a lead melody that Smith sang and Feldmann pitched up, and was intended to be a "New Years anthem". "Smith" was written as a tribute to Smith's father, who died in April 2020. "Rollercoaster" is written about Smith's sobriety and how it bettered his life. "Annoying" was the final song written for the album and added to the tracklist not long before its release. "Pornstar"'s vocals were recorded a cappella, which the song's instrumental was written around. The song "Internet Killed the Rockstar" was influenced by the Brand New album Your Favorite Weapon's conclusion and was written about how he believes music changed after the downfall of MySpace.

The album's first single was "Karma", released on October 30, 2020. Three weeks after its released a music video was released for the song directed by Machine Gun Kelly. The song's gained increased attention in the following months when Smith's ex-girlfriend Tana Mongeau made a video describing why she believes the song was about her. The song "Bones" was released as the album's second single on November 27, 2020. The music video for "Bones" was released on December 21, 2020, directed by Charlie Zwick. The album's third single was "Flames", featuring Avril Lavigne was released on January 8, 2021. The song charted at number 8 on the Billboard US Rock Digital Songs chart entered the top 100 charts in New Zealand, Canada and the United Kingdom. The album was officially released February 12, 2021, through Big Noise music group, and peaked at number 21 on the Billboard Heatseekers Albums chart.

On March 12, 2021, he released the single "Heavy" featuring Blackbear. On April 16, 2021, an acoustic version of "Flames" was released. On April 17, 2020, Smith announced the release of a deluxe version of the album would be released, featuring eight additional original tracks, including the previously released songs "Heavy" and acoustic version of "Flames", as well as an acoustic version of "Karma" and a piano version of "Bones". It was released on May 7, 2021. On May 21 a music video was released for the deluxe version's track "Amnesia".

== Composition ==
While Internet Killed the Rockstar has been described by a number of critics as a pop punk album, DeadPress writer Stevie Blackburn Smith said that "it is to pigeon-hole it into a particular genre", despite noting its elements of pop punk and pop music. In reference to the sound of the album, in an interview with Inked that:

[This album] is a statement to when I was growing up... when I was growing up, I had to have my three best friends in the room to even make music. We were the last era of garage bands and then the internet came along so we started making solo music. But now I’m feeling the desire for camaraderie and the hunger to make music like I did when I was 16 again... Pop-punk is based on pounding music with sad lyrics about breakups, growing up, being an outcast and not fitting in... Bands like Dashboard Confessional lit the fire inside of me by having a guy with a guitar being able to make you fucking cry. It’s true emotion and I think that’s what music was missing in the last decade.

Smith has cited Dashboard Confessional, New Found Glory, Brand New, the Cure, Foo Fighters, the Smiths and Fall Out Boy as influences for the album.

The album led to publications like Inked referring to Smith as one of the main figures in the 2020s pop punk revival, GQ called him "one of the most revolutionary and original artists of the American record scene".

== Track listing ==
Internet Killed the Rockstar track listing
No.	Title	Writer(s)	Length
1.	"Karma"	Derek "Mod Sun" Smith; John Feldmann; JP Clark	2:39
2.	"Bones"	Smith; Feldmann	2:49
3.	"Flames" (featuring Avril Lavigne)	Smith; Feldmann; Lavigne	2:31
4.	"Betterman"	Smith; Feldmann	3:00
5.	"Prayer"	Smith; Feldmann	2:42
6.	"Twentynumb"	Smith; Feldmann	2:16
7.	"Smith"	Smith; Feldmann	3:30
8.	"Rollercoaster"	Smith; Feldmann; Larry Gashi	2:33
9.	"Annoying"	Smith; Feldmann	3:19
10.	"Pornstar"	Smith; Feldmann	2:33
11.	"Internet Killed the Rockstar"	Smith; Feldmann	2:39
Total length:			30:36

Deluxe edition bonus tracks
No.	Title	Writer(s)	Length
12.	"Amnesia"	Smith; Feldmann	2:51
13.	"Flames" (featuring Avril Lavigne) (Acoustic)	Smith; Feldmann; Lavigne	2:27
14.	"Painkiller"	Smith; Feldmann	2:15
15.	"Bones" (Piano version)	Smith; Feldmann	2:47
16.	"Edge"	Smith; Feldmann	2:58
17.	"Karma" (Acoustic)	Smith; Feldmann; Clark	2:39
18.	"Breakdowns"	Smith; Michael Bono	3:01
19.	"Heavy" (featuring Blackbear)	Smith; Matthew Musto; Matthew Marino; Clark; Ryan Daly	2:47
Total length:			52:25

Notes

- "Twentynumb" is stylized as "TwentyNUMB".

== Personnel ==
- Mod Sun – vocals
- John Feldmann – production
- Dylan McLean – mixing, engineering, production assistance
- Scot Stewart – mixing, engineering, production assistance (all tracks); electric bass guitar (tracks 2–5, 7, 9, 11, 12, 14), electric guitar (2–5, 7, 9, 12, 14, 18), acoustic guitar (4, 13)
- Josh Thornberry – engineering assistance

== Charts ==
Chart performance for Internet Killed the Rockstar
Chart (2021)	Peak position
US Heatseekers Albums (Billboard)	21
