= God Save the Teen =

Studio album by Mod Sun
- Released: February 3, 2023
- Studios: Foxy Studios, Los Angeles, U.S.
- Genre: Pop-punk
- Length: 36:09
- Label: Big Noise
- Producer: John Feldmann

Mod Sun chronology
Internet Killed the Rockstar (2021)	God Save the Teen (2023)

God Save the Teen is the fifth studio album by American musician Mod Sun, released on February 3, 2023, by Big Noise Music Group. The album is produced by John Feldmann and marks the second pop-punk album by Mod Sun, following 2021's Internet Killed the Rockstar. It features Avril Lavigne and Royal & the Serpent.

== Release ==
God Save the Teen was first announced in November 2022 on Mod Sun's social media accounts. The announcement came with a short teaser which played a snippet from "Wolves".

In the twelve days leading up to the album's release on February 3, Sun would release a short video each day with a snippet of one of the album's twelve tracks.

God Save the Teen contains no commercial or promotional singles. In the time between Mod Sun's fourth and fifth albums, he released five stand-alone singles, "Down" (featuring Travis Barker), "Rich Kids Ruin Everything", "Perfectly Imperfect", "Battle Scars", and "Sexoxo" (featuring Charlotte Sands). While these songs were heavily speculated to be a part of the upcoming album, this rumor turned out to be untrue. According to Mod Sun, the album was originally set to include singles, though he felt they didn't contribute to the album's theme and wrote new songs to replace them.

The album spawned a tour that lasted from February 19 to April 2, 2023, and ended in Los Angeles.

== Themes ==
Much of God Save the Teen's lyrical content revolves around Mod Sun's personal relationships, including that of his then-fiancé, Avril Lavigne. Soon after the album was released, the couple broke up, causing him to dedicate "Avril's Song" to whichever city he was playing while on tour instead of to his ex-girlfriend.

The album includes a cover of "Iris" by the Goo Goo Dolls. Mod Sun credits the song with being the "song that saved him". Following the album's release, the Goo Goo Dolls applauded his version of the song by shouting it out on the band's official Facebook and Twitter pages.

== Track listing ==
God Save the Teen track listing
No.	Title	Writer(s)	Length
1.	"Eyelids"	Derek "Mod Sun" Smith; John Feldmann	2:47
2.	"Revenge"	Smith; Feldmann; JP Clark	2:37
3.	"Avril's Song"	Smith; Feldmann	2:45
4.	"Shelter" (featuring Avril Lavigne)	Smith; Feldmann; Avril Lavigne	3:10
5.	"Courtney Fucked Kurt"	Smith; Feldmann	1:32
6.	"SOS" (featuring Royal & the Serpent)	Smith; Feldmann; Ryan Santiago	2:58
7.	"Single Mothers"	Smith; Feldmann; Brennan Elliot	3:29
8.	"Iris"	John Rzeznik	2:57
9.	"When We're Dead"	Smith; Feldmann; Evan Gartner; Andrew Migliore	3:00
10.	"Wolves"	Smith; Feldmann	3:53
11.	"Drive"	Smith; Feldmann	3:14
12.	"Delusional Confidence"	Smith; Feldmann	3:42
Total length:			36:09

Notes

- "SOS" contains an interpolation of "Wishing Well", performed by Juice WRLD.
