= Look Up (Mod Sun album) =

Studio album by Mod Sun
- Released: March 10, 2015
- Recorded: September 2014
- Studio: Blooming Sounds USA (Paris, France)
- Genre: Hip hop
- Length: 43:51
- Label: Rostrum
- Producer: Benjy Grinberg (exec.); Dave Siegel; Mod Sun; Blackbear

Mod Sun chronology
Look Up (2015)	Movie (2017)

Professional ratings
Review scores
Source	Rating
AllMusic	3.5/5 stars

Look Up is the debut studio album by American musician Mod Sun. It was released on March 10, 2015 through Rostrum Records.

The album debuted at number 120 on the US Billboard 200.

== Track listing ==
Look Up - Standard edition track listing
No.	Title	Length
1.	"Look Up"	0:49
2.	"Headed Home"	3:42
3.	"Free Love"	3:22
4.	"Goddess" (featuring G-Eazy)	3:14
5.	"Did It Again Last Night"	1:06
6.	"Howlin' At The Moon"	3:38
7.	"My Hippy" (featuring Dizzy Wright)	4:11
8.	"Shoot ‘Em Down" (featuring Machine Gun Kelly & Blackbear)	3:15
9.	"My Favorite Shirt Is My Skin"	2:12
10.	"Never Quit" (featuring Travis Barker)	3:10
11.	"1970"	2:22
12.	"Not That Bad" (featuring Jody Highroller)	3:52
13.	"Modivation"	2:03
14.	"Mushrooms"	2:51
15.	"Same Way Pt. 2"	4:04
Total length:		43:51

Look Up & iTunes audio book - track listing
No.	Title	Length
16.	"Did I Ever Wake Up?, Pt. 1"	9:59
17.	"Did I Ever Wake Up?, Pt. 2"	8:33
18.	"Did I Ever Wake Up?, Pt. 3"	9:58
19.	"Did I Ever Wake Up?, Pt. 4"	9:58
20.	"Did I Ever Wake Up?, Pt. 5"	9:59
Total length:		1:32:18

== Charts ==
Chart (2015)	Peak position
US Billboard 200	120
US Top Alternative Albums (Billboard)	6
US Top R&B/Hip-Hop Albums (Billboard)	13
US Independent Albums (Billboard)	7
US Heatseekers Albums (Billboard)	1
