= Iris (song) =

1998 song by Goo Goo Dolls

- Artwork for 1998 retail release

Single by Goo Goo Dolls

from the album Dizzy Up the Girl and City of Angels
- Released: April 1, 1998
- Genre: Alternative rock; soft rock; pop rock
- Length: 4:50 (album version); 3:35 (radio/video edit)
- Label: Reprise; Warner Bros.
- Songwriter: John Rzeznik
- Producers: Rob Cavallo; Goo Goo Dolls

Goo Goo Dolls singles chronology
"Lazy Eye" (1997)	"Iris" (1998)	"Slide" (1998)

Music video
- "Iris" on YouTube

"Iris" is a song by the American alternative rock band Goo Goo Dolls. Written for the soundtrack of the 1998 film City of Angels, it was included on the sixth Goo Goo Dolls album, Dizzy Up the Girl, and released as the album's lead single on April 1, 1998.

"Iris" reached number one in Australia, Canada, and Italy, number three in the United Kingdom, and number nine on the US Billboard Hot 100. In Ireland, it is the 19th-most-successful single of all time. "Iris" is the Goo Goo Dolls' signature song and has received critical acclaim, being described as a "ubiquitous" staple for the band's live sets and is one of the best selling singles of all time.

== Composition ==
After completing the first-edit on the film City of Angels, co-producer Bob Cavallo and his son Rob Cavallo, also a music producer, decided to take along musical artists to a viewing to create the soundtrack. Bob took Alanis Morissette whilst Rob took the Goo Goo Dolls. The following morning Morissette called Rob, and asked him to produce the song "Uninvited", which she had written afterwards as a demo. Shortly afterwards that same day, John Rzeznik called Rob with a song he had written called "Iris", a power ballad. In a 2013 interview with Songfacts, Rzeznik explained how he wrote the song:

"I was thinking about the situation of the Nicolas Cage character in the movie. This guy is completely willing to give up his own immortality, just to be able to feel something very human. And I think, 'Wow! What an amazing thing it must be like to love someone so much that you give up everything to be with them.' That's a pretty heavy thought."

Speaking with Songwriting Magazine, Rzeznik said that further inspiration for the song came from the fact that he wanted to be on a soundtrack album with U2, Peter Gabriel and Alanis Morissette.

No character named Iris appears in the film, and the song title is not heard in the lyrics. Rzeznik named the song after country folk singer-songwriter Iris DeMent, after he noticed her name in a concert listing in the LA Weekly newspaper.

Rzeznik uses a non-standard guitar tuning of BDDDDD, with the lowest string tuned to B and every other string tuned to D in different octaves. The song's time signature alternates between 4/4 in the introduction and interludes and 6/8 in the verses and chorus, with a short, single 3/4 anacrusis right before the second verse.

== Commercial performance ==
Upon its release, "Iris" became the second hit from the film's soundtrack, after "Uninvited". The song debuted at number 66 on the Billboard Hot 100 Airplay chart on April 18, 1998, and eventually spent a then-record of 18 weeks at number one in Hot 100 Airplay. However, it was not allowed to chart on the Billboard Hot 100 because no commercial single had been released. On December 5, 1998, the 18th and last week that the song topped the airplay chart, the rules changed to allow airplay-only songs onto the chart. As a result, the song debuted and peaked at number nine and stayed on the chart for 14 weeks.

On the Mainstream Rock Tracks chart, "Iris" peaked at number eight. The song was the band's second number one hit on the Modern Rock Tracks chart, following their 1995 hit "Name". "Iris" stayed at number one for five weeks on the Alternative Songs chart and also hit number one on the Mainstream Top 40 chart for four weeks. The song spent a then-record 17 weeks at number one on the Billboard Adult Top 40 chart (beating No Doubt's 15-week run at number one with "Don't Speak" in 1996–97). The Goo Goo Dolls performed "Iris" on October 20, 2001, at Madison Square Garden as part of The Concert for New York City to raise money for victims of the September 11 attacks.

"Iris" was also an international hit. It peaked at number five on the Irish Singles Chart and has since become the 19th-biggest-selling single of all time in Ireland. The song initially peaked at number 50 in the United Kingdom in August 1998 before rising to number 26 the following year. On October 2, 2011, after performances by auditionees on The X Factor, the song re-entered the UK Singles Chart at number three. In May 2013, the song charted at number 12 after it was covered by Britain's Got Talent contestant Robbie Kennedy. Elsewhere, the song became a number-one hit in Italy (for two weeks), Australia (for five weeks), and Canada (for eight weeks), and it reached the top 10 in Flanders and the Netherlands.

== Accolades and legacy ==
Besides the song's chart success, "Iris" enjoyed critical acclaim. At the 41st Grammy Awards, "Iris" received nominations for Record of the Year and Pop Performance by a Duo or Group. The song also garnered Johnny Rzeznik a Song of the Year nomination. The single was certified diamond by the Recording Industry Association of America on November 15, 2024.

In January 2009, "Iris" was ranked at number 39 on Rolling Stone's list of the 100 greatest pop songs. In October 2012, it was ranked number one on Billboard's "Top 100 Pop Songs 1992–2012" chart, which ranked the top songs of the first 20 years of the Mainstream Top 40/Pop Songs chart. The list also featured the Goo Goo Dolls' hits "Slide", ranking at number nine, and "Name" at number 24. The Goo Goo Dolls are the only musicians to have three songs on the list, two breaking the top 10 and all three falling within the top 25. They are also the only musicians that have back to back singles ("Iris", 1998 and "Slide", 1999) featured on the list. In a revised list in October 2017, "Iris" still ranked in the top 10, at number eight.

The song's melodic and structural similarities to "Piano Man" by Billy Joel have been remarked upon by some commentators. Joel himself has performed the song live with the Goo Goo Dolls.

"Iris" appears on the soundtrack of the 2024 film Deadpool & Wolverine. As a result of its appearance in the film, the song resurged in popularity and reappeared on the Billboard charts. The song is also featured in the third episode of the Apple TV+ series Shrinking's second season, "Psychological Something-ism". It is also briefly used in the 2025 film Companion, whose main character is named Iris.

== Track listings ==
Australian and Japanese maxi-CD single

1. "Iris" – 4:54
2. "Lazy Eye" – 3:48
3. "I Don't Want to Know" – 3:38

UK cassette single

A. "Iris" – 3:36
B. "Lazy Eye" – 3:46

UK CD single

1. "Iris" – 3:36
2. "Lazy Eye" – 3:46
3. "I Don't Want to Know" – 3:37

European CD single

1. "Iris" (radio edit) – 3:37
2. "Iris" (acoustic) – 3:24

== Personnel ==
Personnel are taken from the Iris single liner notes, except where noted.

Goo Goo Dolls

- John Rzeznik – vocals, guitar
- Robby Takac – bass guitar, backing vocals
- Mike Malinin – drums

Additional musicians

- David Campbell – string arrangements
- Tim Pierce – mandolin, slide guitar solo
- Jamie Muhoberac – piano

Technical personnel

- Rob Cavallo, Goo Goo Dolls – producers
- Allen Sides – engineer
- Jack Joseph Puig – mixing

== Charts ==
=== Weekly charts ===
Chart (1998–2016)	Peak position
Australia (ARIA)	1
Austria (Ö3 Austria Top 40)	47
Belgium (Ultratop 50 Flanders)	3
Canada Top Singles (RPM)	1
Canada Adult Contemporary (RPM)	13
Canada Rock/Alternative (RPM)	2
Canada Digital Song Sales (Billboard)	41
Colombia (Notimex)	9
Costa Rica (Notimex)	3
Europe (Eurochart Hot 100)	51
Honduras (Notimex)	2
Iceland (Íslenski Listinn Topp 40)	5
Ireland (IRMA)	5
Italy (Musica e dischi)	1
Netherlands (Dutch Top 40)	8
Netherlands (Single Top 100)	9
New Zealand (Recorded Music NZ)	16
Norway (VG-lista)	19
Poland Airplay (ZPAV)	79
Scottish Singles Sales (Official Charts)	2
Sweden (Sverigetopplistan)	34
UK Singles (Official Charts)	3
UK Rock & Metal (OCC)	1
US Billboard Hot 100	9
US Adult Alternative Airplay (Billboard)	2
US Adult Contemporary (Billboard)	22
US Adult Pop Airplay (Billboard)	1
US Alternative Airplay (Billboard)	1
US Mainstream Rock Airplay (Billboard)	8
US Pop Airplay (Billboard)	1

Chart (2021–2026)	Peak position
Austria (Ö3 Austria Top 40)	30
Brazil Hot 100 (Billboard)	98
Canada Digital Songs (Billboard)	9
Czech Republic Singles Digital (ČNS IFPI)	72
Germany (GfK)	34
Global 200 (Billboard)	16
Greece International (IFPI)	45
Israel International Airplay (Media Forest)	15
Italy (FIMI)	70
Luxembourg (Billboard)	22
Panama Streaming (PRODUCE)	105
Philippines (IFPI)	14
Philippines (Philippines Hot 100)	14
Portugal (AFP)	33
Sweden (Sverigetopplistan)	19
Switzerland (Schweizer Hitparade)	23
UK Singles (Official Charts)	39
US Digital Song Sales (Billboard)	14
US Hot Rock & Alternative Songs (Billboard)	11

=== Monthly charts ===
Monthly chart performance
Chart (2026)	Peak position
Panama Streaming (PRODUCE)	138

=== Year-end charts ===
Chart (1998)	Position
Australia (ARIA)	3
Canada Top Singles (RPM)	12
Canada Adult Contemporary (RPM)	77
Canada Rock/Alternative (RPM)	9
US Adult Top 40 (Billboard)	3
US Mainstream Rock Tracks (Billboard)	23
US Mainstream Top 40 (Billboard)	1
US Modern Rock Tracks (Billboard)	6
US Triple-A (Billboard)	2

Chart (1999)	Position
Belgium (Ultratop 50 Flanders)	20
Netherlands (Dutch Top 40)	46
Netherlands (Single Top 100)	55
US Billboard Hot 100	94
US Adult Contemporary (Billboard)	48
US Adult Top 40 (Billboard)	20
US Mainstream Top 40 (Billboard)	82
US Top 40 Tracks (Billboard)	28

Chart (2006)	Position
UK Singles (OCC)	197

Chart (2011)	Position
UK Singles (OCC)	80

Chart (2012)	Position
UK Singles (OCC)	183

Chart (2022)	Position
Australia (ARIA)	58
UK Singles (OCC)	73

Chart (2023)	Position
Australia (ARIA)	56
UK Singles (OCC)	64

Chart (2024)	Position
Australia (ARIA)	37
Global 200 (Billboard)	122
Philippines (Philippines Hot 100)	95
Portugal (AFP)	104
UK Singles (OCC)	42
US Hot Rock & Alternative Songs (Billboard)	51

Chart (2025)	Position
Australia (ARIA)	39
Global 200 (Billboard)	29
Netherlands (Single Top 100)	44
Philippines (Philippines Hot 100)	27
Sweden (Sverigetopplistan)	45
UK Singles (OCC)	28

=== All-time charts ===
Chart	Position
Ireland (IRMA)	19
UK Singles (OCC)	178

== Certifications ==
Region	Certification	Certified units/sales
Australia (ARIA)	2× Platinum	140,000^{^}
Belgium (BRMA)	Gold	25,000^{*}
Canada (Music Canada)	Diamond	800,000^{‡}
Denmark (IFPI Danmark)	Platinum	90,000^{‡}
Italy (FIMI) sales since 2009	3× Platinum	300,000^{‡}
New Zealand (RMNZ)	10× Platinum	300,000^{‡}
Portugal (AFP)	5× Platinum	50,000^{‡}
Spain (Promusicae)	2× Platinum	200,000^{‡}
United Kingdom (BPI)	8× Platinum	4,800,000^{‡}
United States (RIAA)	Diamond	10,000,000^{‡}
Streaming
Greece (IFPI Greece)	2× Platinum	4,000,000^{†}
^{*} Sales figures based on certification alone.^{^} Shipments figures based on certification alone.^{‡} Sales+streaming figures based on certification alone.^{†} Streaming-only figures based on certification alone.

== Release history ==
Region	Date	Format(s)	Label(s)	Ref.
Australia	April 1, 1998	CD	Reprise	
United States	April 7, 1998	Contemporary hit radio	Reprise	
Japan	June 15, 1998	CD	Warner Bros.	
United Kingdom	July 13, 1998	CD; cassette	Warner Sunset; Reprise	

== Phoebe & Maggie version ==
"Iris"

Single by Phoebe & Maggie
- Released: November 2020
- Genre: Indie folk
- Length: 3:09

Phoebe Bridgers singles chronology
"Miracle of Life" (2020)	"Iris" (2020)	"If We Make It Through December" (2020)

Maggie Rogers singles chronology
"Love You for a Long Time" (2019)	"Iris" (2020)	"That's Where I Am" (2022)

While awaiting the results of the 2020 United States presidential election on November 3, singer-songwriter Phoebe Bridgers tweeted that she would cover "Iris". The cover, which was recorded as a duet with Maggie Rogers under the name Phoebe & Maggie, was released exclusively via Bridgers' Bandcamp page for one day only on November 13, with proceeds going towards Stacey Abrams' Fair Fight organization to promote fair elections in the state of Georgia as well as nationally. Despite only being available for purchase for one day, the song debuted at number one on the Digital Song Sales chart and number 57 on the Billboard Hot 100, making it both artists' first entry on the latter chart. The song has also charted in Australia, New Zealand, and Scotland.

On November 4, 2022, the song was re-released, again for only 24 hours, ahead of the 2022 midterm elections. Proceeds went to the Brigid Alliance, an abortion care group.

=== Charts ===
Chart (2020)	Peak position
Australian Digital Songs (Billboard)	5
Global 200 (Billboard)	122
New Zealand Hot Singles (Recorded Music NZ)	16
Scottish Singles Sales (Official Charts)	42
US Billboard Hot 100	57
US Hot Rock & Alternative Songs (Billboard)	5

== Other versions ==
- In 2006, Irish singer-songwriter Ronan Keating released a cover of "Iris" on his album Bring You Home.
- In 2007 American punk rock and pop punk band New Found Glory released a cover of the song on their album From the Screen to Your Stereo Part II.
- In 2009, Boyz II Men released a cover of "Iris" on their album Love.
- In 2012, British boy band the Wanted released a live cover of "Iris" as the B-side to their single "Glad You Came".
- In 2012, Sleeping with Sirens released an acoustic cover of "Iris" on YouTube.
- In 2020, Diamante and Breaking Benjamin singer Benjamin Burnley released a duet cover of "Iris".
- In October 2022, American grocery chain Kroger partnered with singer Colbie Caillat to record a special stylized rendition of "Iris" for its Today's Holiday Moments are Tomorrow's Memories short film and associated ad campaign.
- Separately, Canadian country music artist Josh Ross released his own version of "Iris" on his November 2022 extended play Live Sessions.
- In November 2022, Australian singer-songwriter Dean Lewis performed an acoustic cover of "Iris" on Qmusic. The cover was later included as a bonus track on the deluxe edition of his EP The Epilogue in May 2025.
- In 2023, pop-punk singer, rapper, and songwriter Mod Sun released a cover of "Iris" on his fifth studio album God Save the Teen.
- In 2024, country music singer Mitchell Tenpenny released a version of "Iris" for his album titled The 3rd.
- In 2024, American football player Kobie Turner released a cover of "Iris" as the Goo on The Masked Singer.
- In May 2025, Machine Gun Kelly and Julia Wolf released a cover of "Iris".
- In September 2025, Davey T Hamilton released a cover of "Iris".

== See also ==
- List of best-selling singles
- List of songs which have spent the most weeks on the UK Singles Chart
