= Nick Gross =

American drummer

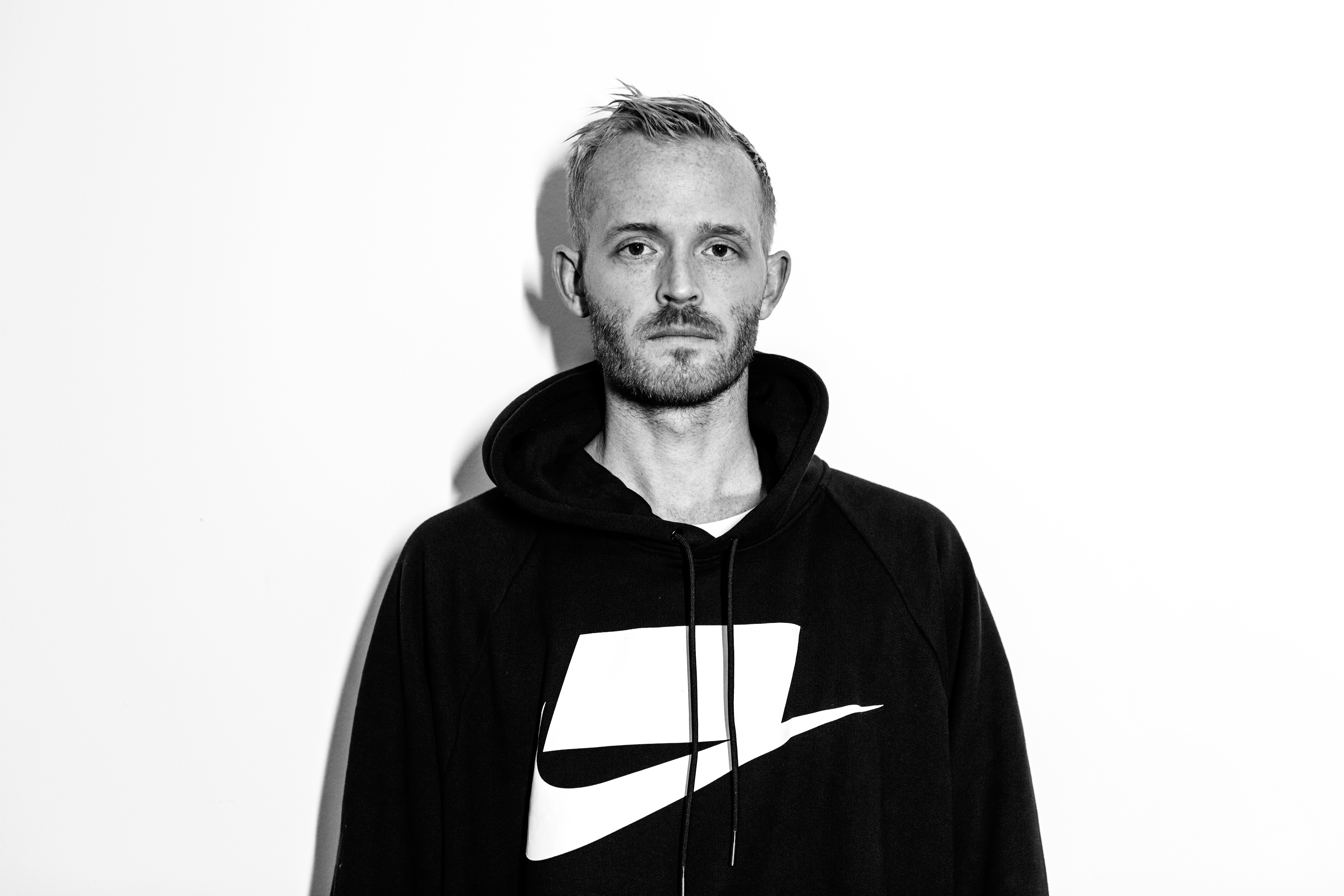
- Born: July 19, 1988 (age 38)
- Occupations: Entrepreneur; Musician; Investor
- Known for: Founder of Find Your Grind; Drummer for the band Girlfriends
- Spouse: Natasha Barritt
- Children: 1
- Parent(s): Bill H. Gross; Sue Gross
- Musical career
- Genres: Pop-punk; punk rock; ska punk; alternative rock
- Instrument: Drums
- Member of: Goldfinger; girlfriends

Nicholas William Gross (born 19 July 1988) is an American entrepreneur, musician, and the founder of the Find Your Grind education platform. Gross founded the band Girlfriends together with Travis Mills in 2020. He is also a member of Goldfinger.

== Early life ==
Gross grew up in Laguna Beach, California, the only son of billionaire American investor Bill H. Gross and his second wife Sue, and began playing the drums around age seven. He started a career as a drummer and in subsequent years was the drummer for bands Open Air Stereo and Half the Animal. With Open Air Stereo, Gross took part in the reality show Laguna Beach: The Real Orange County. The band later signed with Epic Records.

In 2009, Gross launched STRZ Enterprises, a record studio and record label.

== Career ==
=== Gross Labs ===
In 2018, Gross founded Gross Labs as parent company of investments, Find Your Grind and Big Noise, among others. Gross Labs invested in X Games, 100 Thieves, BuzzFeed, DraftKings, among others.

In 2019 Gross led a series A funding of $10.8 million for ReKTGlobal.

In October 2024, Gross invested in TMRW Sports and Los Angeles Golf Club, among others via Brekky Golf Company, a holding company founded by Gross and Sean Maher.

In October 2025, Gross joined the ownership group of Breakaway Music Festival together with Shaun Neff.

In December 2025, Gross Labs became an investor alongside Russell Westbrook and Echo Investment Capital in the development of a new entertainment district in Oklahoma City that will include hotels, music venues, educational hubs and the Oklahoma City Stadium.

=== Find Your Grind ===
In 2018, Gross founded Find Your Grind as an education platform with free online curriculum for students. Celebrity mentors included Tony Hawk, Monique Coleman and Will.i.am.

In April 2025, Gross was appointed by the TGR Foundation to its board of governors.

FYG raised a Series A funding round of $5 million led by Echo Investment Capital in November 2025.

In 2025, Find Your Grind became an ESSA validated program.

==== Foundation ====
In 2015, Nick and Natasha Gross founded the Find Your Grind Foundation to support disadvantaged young people.

In September 2015, Find Your Grind Foundation collaborated with Anaheim Ducks to start the Find Your Grind Hockey Scholarship Program.

In 2021, FYG Foundation partnered with the Tiger Woods Foundation to give more students access to the education platform.

=== Big Noise ===
In 2018, Gross founded the music group Big Noise together with ex-Vagrant executive Jon Cohen and rock producer John Feldmann. He is CEO of Big Noise. In 2019 the label's roster included Ashley Tisdale and New Politics.

In 2019, Big Noise launched the Noise Nest, a 5000-sq. ft recording studio in Los Angeles and launched the FYG U Music + Tech Festival.

In June 2019, Big Noise acquired the hip-hop label Commission Record. Its roster includes MadeinTYO, Lil Dicky, Derez De'Shon and DJ Envy. On 7 June 2019, The Wrecks signed with Big Noise. The same year The Used and Travis Tritt also signed with Big Noise.

On 1 November 2019, New Politics released their fifth album "An Invitation to an Alternate Reality".

Tyler Posey and his band Five North released their debut EP Scumbag via Big Noise on 6 March 2020.

By 2021 Big Noise had expanded their 10,000 sq ft. recording studio facility The Noise Nest with five recording studios and rooms for streaming and gaming. Alongside the signed artists from Big Noise other clients like Post Malone, DaBaby and A$AP Rocky use the facilities for work.

Mod Sun signed a long-term deal with Big Noise in March 2021, and has since released two albums; Internet Killed the Rockstar in 2021, and God Save the Teen in 2023, under Big Noise. Both albums were produced by John Feldmann.

In March 2022, The Veronicas signed with Big Noise. In March 2023, indie record label Position Music and Big Noise launched a music publishing joint venture.

On 1 September 2023, Escape the Fate released their 8th Album "Out of the Shadows" via Big Noise.

On 9 May 2025, Avril Lavigne and Simple Plan released the Single "Young & Dumb".

=== Goldfinger and girlfriends ===
Since 2018, Gross had been touring drummer for Goldfinger. Two years later, he became the official drummer of the band.

In 2020, Gross formed the band girlfriends with Travis Mills, with the duo citing Blink-182, 5 Seconds of Summer and All Time Low as the band's musical influences. The band released the first single "California" on June 26, 2020, with the music video being released on August 11. This was followed by their second single "Eyes Wide Shut" on 21 August 2020. Their self-titled debut album was released on 23 October 2020 featuring 14 tracks. The production was led by John Feldmann.

On 17 June 2022, girlfriends released their second album "(e)motion sickness".

In March 2023, girlfriends released the single "Over My Dead Body" via Big Noise. They also released "Life's A Brittany" on 14 April 2023.

=== Esports ===
In 2018, FYG partnered with esports platform ReKTGlobal, parent company of Rogue and London Royal Ravens, in scholarships for students who want to pursue esports. He became a member of the board and the lead investor in ReKTGlobal. In 2022, ReKTGlobal was acquired by entertainment company Infinite Reality and Rogue merged with Spanish esports organization KOI. In 2018, FYG created the Fortnite based Junior Rogue program in partnership with ReKTGlobal to give young people the opportunity to get into esports and receive a scholarship through the Find Your Grind Foundation. DrLupo participated as mentor in the program.

=== Other investments ===
In February 2022, Gross became an investor in Mexican football club Necaxa.

== Awards ==
Find Your Grind was listed in the 'Brands that Matter in 2022' by Fast Company.

== Personal life ==
Gross is married to Natasha Gross (born Natasha Barritt), the executive director of the Find Your Grind Foundation. They have one child together. Gross enjoys surfing, running and skating.
