= Nick Long =

American songwriter and singer

Nicholas Alexander Long is an American songwriter and singer. He is best known as the founder and frontman of indie pop band Dark Waves, and for co-writing and producing Machine Gun Kelly's Tickets to My Downfall, Mainstream Sellout and Lost Americana albums. Long has also co-written several singles, including Børns' "Electric Love".

== Early life ==
Nicholas Alex Long was born in Santa Barbara. Long started playing guitar when he was 8 years old, and began to play in bands when he was 10 or 11.

== Career ==
=== Early career ===
Long first gained attention as guitarist of Santa Barbara punk act Staring Back in 2002, replacing their original guitarist who quit during the band's participation in Warped Tour.

In the mid-2000s, Long fronted the punk group Sicker Than Others. The band released one album, Honestly, and had recorded a second album which went unreleased. The song "Face Away" was included on the soundtrack of Skate, and the band's touring line-up included Versus the World frontman Donald Spence on guitar. Sicker Than Others was active until 2007.

From 2008 onward, Long played guitar and fronted post-hardcore band Dead Country, releasing a four-track EP in 2010. A second EP was also released, though has since been removed from streaming services.

Long's next band, Wild Heart, was formed in the early 2010s, releasing "The Heartbeat, The Soul" (which would be re-released when Long formed Dark Waves) and "Big Windy Mansion." The band supported Unwritten Law on a single European tour before disbanding.

=== Dark Waves ===
Long signed a record deal in 2012, and in 2013 founded Dark Waves, which released a self-titled synth-pop EP in September the following year with Five Seven Music. A single off the EP, "I Don't Wanna Be In Love", was featured in an episode of The Vampire Diaries and has been streamed over five million times on Spotify.

=== Songwriting ===
In 2014, while experiencing challenges with his record label, Long accepted an invitation from friend and collaborator Tommy English to co-write music for Børns. English and Long co-wrote "Electric Love" with Garrett Borns and Josh Moran. The song was originally recorded and released as the first single from Børns' 2014 debut EP Candy, and was re-released on his 2015 LP, Dopamine. On February 26, 2017, the song was certified Platinum by the Recording Industry Association of America.

Long co-wrote King Princess' 2018 debut single "1950", a tribute to the 1952 novel The Price of Salt by Patricia Highsmith.

According to Spotify, Long is credited as a songwriter on the 2022 Blink 182 single "Edging".

==== Collaboration with Machine Gun Kelly ====
In 2017, songwriter Jacob "JKash" Kasher, who is married to Long's manager Jaime Zeluck-Hindlin, invited Long to a recording session with Colson Baker, known professionally as Machine Gun Kelly. Baker, Long, and Travis Barker co-wrote "I Think I'm Okay", which was recorded by Machine Gun Kelly, Yungblud, and Barker, and released as a single in 2019 from Machine Gun Kelly's fourth studio album, Hotel Diablo. The song was certified Platinum by the RIAA in 2020.

In 2019, Baker, Barker, and Long began a months-long daily songwriting collaboration, starting with "Bloody Valentine". The songs written during this period became the tracks of Machine Gun Kelly's fifth studio album, Tickets to My Downfall, with "Bloody Valentine" serving as the record's first single, followed by "Concert for Aliens" and "My Ex's Best Friend". Long is credited as a songwriter on 14 of the album's 16 tracks. The album debuted at number one on the US Billboard 200 all-format albums chart, moving 126,000 album equivalent units in its first week, and won Top Rock Album at the 2021 Billboard Music Awards and Alternate-Rock Album of the Year at the iHeartRadio Music Awards. Long can be seen playing guitar and singing backup vocals on Machine Gun Kelly's appearance as musical guest on Saturday Night Live in January 2021.

In 2022, Long again collaborated with Baker and Barker to co-produce and co-write Machine Gun Kelly's sixth studio album, Mainstream Sellout. The record debuted at number one on the US all-format Billboard 200 albums chart, the Canadian Albums Chart, and Australia's ARIA charts.

== Personal life ==
Long is married to YouTube creator Julia, who goes by handle itsblitzzz, and has appeared in several of her videos. The two had a daughter named Honor in 2022. In 2024, the couple had a second daughter named Pierce.
