= Acting Like That =

2020 single by Yungblud

Single by Yungblud featuring Machine Gun Kelly and Travis Barker

from the album Weird!
- Written: December 2019
- Released: 2 December 2020
- Genre: Pop punk
- Length: 3:03
- Label: Locomotion; Interscope
- Songwriters: Dominic Harrison; Colson Baker; Travis Barker; Chris Greatti; Nick Long; Zakk Cervini
- Producer: Travis Barker

Yungblud singles chronology
"Mars" (2020)	"Acting Like That" (2020)	"Patience" (2021)

Machine Gun Kelly singles chronology
"My Ex's Best Friend" (2020)	"Acting Like That" (2020)	"Daywalker" (2021)

Travis Barker singles chronology
"Estella" (2020)	"Acting Like That" (2020)	"Hills Have Eyes" (2021)

Music video
- "Acting Like That" on YouTube

"Acting Like That" is a song by English musician Yungblud featuring American musicians Machine Gun Kelly and Travis Barker, released on 2 December 2020 as the sixth single from the former's second studio album Weird!.

== Background ==
The song was written about a night the two vocalists spent together after the death of the mutual friend Juice Wrld. According to Yungblud, despite being saddened by the event, they cheered one another up by deciding that they were "way too cool to be acting like that". The following morning, they wrote the song.

The song is the third collaboration between the three musicians, following 2019's "I Think I'm Okay" and 2020's "Body Bag", which also featured Bert McCracken. The release of the song was announced on 30 November 2020, which was followed by Yungblud releasing teasers for the song on social media in the following days. The song was officially released on 3 December 2020, as the sixth single from the album.

== Music video ==
A music video for the song was released on 21 January 2021. The video parodies the different reaction to the then-ongoing COVID-19 pandemic, through the metaphor of a zombie apocalypse. Because of the pandemic, Yungblud and Machine Gun Kelly's segments of the video were filmed separately in Greenwich, London and Los Angeles respectively. The video also features a cameo from social media influencer Abby Roberts, as a zombie who infects Yungblud.

== Reception ==
The Guardian writer Issy Simpson perceived the song to be objectifying, stating that "Being a woman in 2020 can be tough, but luckily for us girls, there's always a man around to tell us exactly how to behave" and that "they're wrong, because there's no attractiveness barrier to being a complete mess: it's an equal-opportunities activity". Clash called it a love it or hate it song but contended that that's where both artists do best.

According to an article by NME, users on TikTok drew comparisons between the song's chorus melody and that of Metro Station's 2008 song "Shake It". In response, Metro Station tweeted they felt "honored".

== Personnel ==
Credits adapted from Tidal.

Musicians

- Yungblud – vocals, composition, lyrics
- Machine Gun Kelly – vocals, composition, lyrics
- Travis Barker – drums, production, composition, lyrics
- Chris Greatti – composition, lyrics, background vocals
- Nick Long – composition, lyrics
- Zakk Cervini – composition, lyrics, vocal programming

Technical

- Adam Hawkins – engineering, mixing
- K Thrash – engineering
- Matt Malpass – engineering
- Shaan Singh – engineering

== Charts ==
Chart performance for "Acting Like That"
Chart (2019)	Peak position
Belgium (Ultratip Bubbling Under Flanders)	17
Czech Republic Airplay (ČNS IFPI)	7
New Zealand Hot Singles (RMNZ)	14
US Hot Rock & Alternative Songs (Billboard)	16

== Certifications ==
Region	Certification	Certified units/sales
United Kingdom (BPI)	Silver	200,000^{‡}
^{‡} Sales+streaming figures based on certification alone.
