= Tickets to My Downfall =

Studio album by Machine Gun Kelly
- Released: September 25, 2020
- Recorded: 2019–2020
- Genre: Pop-punk
- Length: 36:09
- Labels: EST 19XX; Bad Boy; Interscope
- Producers: Keith Varon; Machine Gun Kelly; Nick Mira; Omer Fedi; Travis Barker

Machine Gun Kelly chronology
Hotel Diablo (2019)	Tickets to My Downfall (2020)	Mainstream Sellout (2022)

Singles from Tickets to My Downfall
- 1. "Bloody Valentine" Released: May 1, 2020; 2. "Concert for Aliens" Released: August 5, 2020; 3. "My Ex's Best Friend" Released: August 7, 2020

Tickets to My Downfall is the fifth studio album by American musician Machine Gun Kelly. It was released on September 25, 2020, by Bad Boy Records and Interscope Records. The album marks a departure from his established rap sound and became a more guitar-driven pop-punk album. It was his first collaborative project with drummer and producer Travis Barker, and features guest appearances from Halsey, Trippie Redd, Blackbear, and Iann Dior, as well as Bert McCracken and Yungblud on its deluxe edition.

Tickets to My Downfall was preceded by the release of the singles: "Bloody Valentine", "Concert for Aliens" and "My Ex's Best Friend". The album was a commercial success, debuting atop the US Billboard 200, his first to do so. It was well received by critics, and went on to be his first album to be certified platinum by the RIAA.

== Background and recording ==
Machine Gun Kelly had released four studio albums through the 2010s. While his first four studio albums had been hip hop/rap styled, by the end of the decade, Baker started moving into a rock music direction. In 2019, Baker appeared in the film The Dirt, a biographic film about the band Mötley Crüe where he played drummer Tommy Lee. The same year, Baker released his fourth studio album, Hotel Diablo, which ended with the track "I Think I'm Okay", a more rock-leaning song collaboration with Yungblud and Blink-182 drummer Travis Barker. It was released as a single and became very popular, hitting number 8 on the year-end Billboard US Hot Rock Songs and ended up being certified platinum in the US.

Baker, wishing to explore the sound further, booked a day in recording studio to work with Barker, to record what would become the song "Bloody Valentine". The session was so powerful to Baker that he asked Barker to set aside two months for them to collaborate on an entire studio album, to which Barker obliged. For much of the rest of the year, Baker would refer to working on the album informally referred to as "the untitled pop punk project". Along with Baker on vocals and guitar, the entire album would feature Barker on drums and as a producer.

Prior to the recording of the album, Baker expressed a wish for the album to include features from Bert McCracken of the Used and Chris Fronzak from Attila. The album went on to feature collaborations with Halsey on the track "Forget Me Too", Blackbear on the track "My Ex's Best Friend", Trippie Redd on the track "All I Know", and Iann Dior on "Nothing Inside", as well as McCracken and Yungblud on "Body Bag", from the album's deluxe edition. Other collaborations in the studio included Goody Grace, Mod Sun, Young Thug, and another collaboration with Yungblud. "Body Bag", features heavy similarities to Fall Out Boy’s 2005 single "Dance, Dance", which require clearance from the band for use, which was given by Pete Wentz and Patrick Stump just a day prior to release. Baker also noted that the album originally concluded with a track titled "Times of My Life", but that he couldn't get authorization to publish the song from Tom Petty's estate, who felt the hook was too similar to a song of Petty's. A year after the release, Baker noted that Corey Taylor of Slipknot had recorded some vocals for an unidentified track, but Baker wasn't happy with how it turned out and it didn't make the album. Conversely, Taylor argued that he passed on the song himself, stating he was not happy with the song ideas he was presented with on the track "Can't Look Back".

== Themes and composition ==
Contrary to the hip-hop style of Baker's first four studio albums, Tickets to My Downfall was designed by Baker to be a pop-punk album. Baker created a more guitar-driven and live instrument sound in hopes of inspiring a younger generation to learn guitar. He wished to use the sound to branch out to a larger demographic as well, and succeeded, with Baker noting that his own father liked his music for the first time in his career. Tracks "Bloody Valentine" and "Concert for Aliens" were both described as "pop punk", while "My Ex's Best Friend" was described as having a more modern take on the genre, not quite "the same 'classic' pop punk vibe". The album's delay to September 2020 was something Baker felt worked out in the end, as he noted that the album has a summery, good-times vibe that he felt people could appreciate in enduring the COVID-19 lockdowns.

Baker used a metaphor related to the Goodyear Blimp to explain the meaning of the album title, stating:

As soon as that Goodyear Blimp catches on fire, or that thing starts falling from the sky, I guarantee you every single eye is going to look up at it; every single phone is going to capture that moment; every single person is going to talk about that, right? ‘The Goodyear Blimp fall from the sky.’ But do the headline ever say when you wake up on this casual fuckin’ Wednesday that the Goodyear Blimp is floating, alive and well? No. And that’s kind of sad: that it takes you to crash and burn to get people to pay attention to you again. Tickets To My Downfall couldn’t have been my debut album because...I had to get to a certain height to then decline and crash, and people are aware of this height that I’m at, and they don’t want to see it rise anymore; they want to see it crash. There had to have been a journey for people to care about to still be tuned into, to then see destroy.

== Release and promotion ==
The album was originally expected to release in early 2020 after Baker's repeated teasers in late 2019 and early 2020. The COVID-19 pandemic would delay album release plans. Baker used the time in lockdown to record a series of live-streamed performances titled "LockdownSessions", including a rendition of Paramore's "Misery Business". The song's performance caught the attention of music publications due to Paramore lead vocalist Hayley Williams's own denouncement of the song's lyrics earlier in the year. Baker also live-streamed a cover version of Rihanna’s "Love on the Brain" at the request of Marilyn Manson. Both songs became bonus tracks for a Target store special edition of the album.

The album's first formal single, "Bloody Valentine" was released on May 1, 2020. As of early August, the song had over 30 million YouTube views. At the time of the release, Baker announced that the album had been delayed to summer 2020. A second single, "Concert for Aliens", was debuted on the nationally televised broadcast of Good Morning America, and later released on August 5, 2020. A music video was released a week later, which involved the band performing in front of a large crowd of aliens. A third single, "My Ex's Best Friend" featuring Blackbear, was released on August 7, 2020, and has peaked at number 20 on the US Billboard all-format Hot 100 chart.

On September 7, the album's tracklist and cover art were released. However, later in the day, it was found that the album artwork - a sketch of a man falling down - unbeknownst to Baker, was closely modeled after a photograph that they did not have the legal rights to use, causing Baker to apologize and announce that a new album cover would be created. He later noted he had signed thousands of copies of the album with the outdated album artwork.

The album was released on September 25, 2020, and a livestream of a live performance of the entire album was performed on October 1, 2020. In September 29, a deluxe edition of the album, dubbed the "Sold Out" edition, was released, featuring four new songs, the band's "Misery Business" cover, and an acoustic rendition of "Bloody Valentine". Concurrently, a music video for the track "Drunk Face" was also released.

=== Downfalls High ===
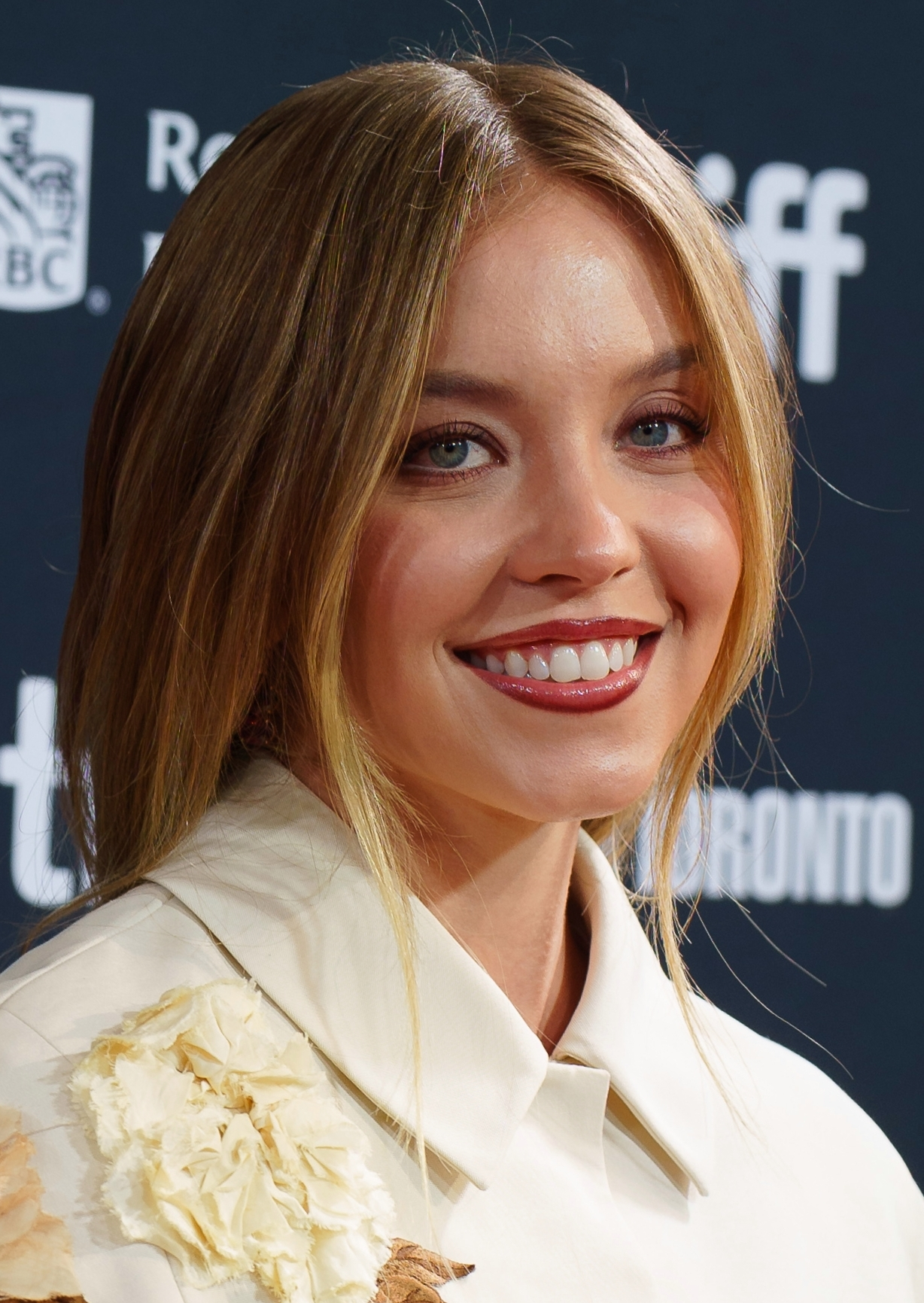
Sydney Sweeney starred in the film adaptation of the album.

The release of a movie based on the album was first announced by Baker on November 22, 2020. The film, titled Downfalls High was premiered at 6 p.m. PST on January 15, 2021, through Facebook.

The film stars Chase Hudson as Fenix, a quiet high schooler, and Sydney Sweeney as the school's popular girl, Scarlett, as they navigate the beginnings of their romantic relationship. It begins following Fenix, as he is in a psychiatric hospital, before cutting to a news report that states that a student at Downfalls High School, whose music had recently gained success, had cut his ear off at graduation. It then flashes back to eight months prior, as Fenix can be seen getting bullied by a jock (Jaden Hossler). Scarlett soon leaves her popular friends to spend time with Fenix, his friend Jimmy (Jimmy Bennett) and Jimmy's girlfriend (Caroline Miner Smith), who had already dropped out of school. Scarlett soon buys Fenix a guitar and is revealed to be pregnant, before being involved in a car accident that kills her, without Fenix knowing about her pregnancy. Through his grieving, Fenix forms the band Pink Switchblade using the guitar, with Jimmy and Jimmy's friend (Landon Barker). After the band's first performance, Scarlett's best friend Tiffany (Maggie Lindemann) romantically pursues Fenix, however he turns her away. Fenix soon discovers Scarlett's pregnancy and decides to chop his ear off at his graduation as an act of despair.

Directed by Baker and Derek Smith, it was filmed in four days during the COVID-19 pandemic. The film also includes appearances from Iann Dior, Omer Fedi, Trippie Redd and Blackbear.

When Smith originally pitched casting Hudson as the film's protagonist, Baker had reservations due to his lack of a background in acting. In an interview with Metro, Smith stated that the main reason for this casting choice was that he wanted to style Hudson's clothing, stating "My first stipulation to working on any project within the last three years was that I can style it. I can’t tell you how fucking much I hate style when I look at TV and I see people literally dressing horribly".

Much of the clothes worn by actors throughout the film were a part of Smith and Baker's then-unreleased clothing line "No Safety". Many were also the pair's own personal clothing.

The film was generally well received and gained over 16 million views in its first weekend. NME rated the film 4/5 stars, stating "In a world of content for content's sake – films have often been used by artists try and extend the lifespan of an album – Downfalls High feels driven by purpose". Whereas, Exclaim! rated it 4/10 and described it as "a 50-minute cringefest that rings hollow."

=== Tour ===
Baker announced via social media that he would be going on tour in further promotion on the album during the fall of 2021 in the Tickets to My Downfall U.S. Tour, joined by Caroles Daughter, Jxdn, and KennyHoopla. The tour dates were only announced in North America due to the COVID-19 pandemic, the album would continue to be promoted internationally in the summer of 2022 via the higher profile Mainstream Sellout Tour. In addition, Baker also announced he would be joining the Kings of Leon and Black Pumas at the three-day NFL Draft from April 29 to May 1, 2021.

== Critical reception ==
Album ratings
Aggregate scores
Source	Rating
AnyDecentMusic?	6.6/10
Metacritic	72/100
Review scores
Source	Rating
AllMusic	3.5/5 stars
Digital Journal	4.5/5 stars
Kerrang!	4/5 stars
NME	4/5 stars
Pitchfork	6.7/10
Rock Sins	8/10 stars
Rolling Stone	3.5/5 stars
Sputnikmusic	1.5/5 stars
TBA Magazine	5/5 stars
Wall of Sound	4/5 stars

The album received generally positive reviews from critics, who praised Kelly's successful transition from hip-hop to pop-punk. At Metacritic, which assigns a normalized rating out of 100 to reviews from mainstream critics, Tickets to My Downfall received an average score of 72 based on 6 reviews indicating "generally favorable reviews". Wall of Sound praised the album, citing Barker's drumming, production and concluding that "What the album lacks in lyrical substance though, is made up for with the abundance of infectious pop melodies and catchy rock choruses." Kerrang! was similarly positive, praising the album for being "...a slick sideways hop from what you might be expecting from Machine Gun Kelly, it's done excellently. It celebrates everything great about pop-punk without feeling cookie-cutter or third division", and disagreed with Wall of Sound's assessment of the lyrics, praising them for its "open-diary honesty that fills the whole album, confessional and unflinching". In a much more critical review, Sputnikmusic claimed the album was a "completely egregious copy-paste of Blink 182’s glory day sound" and the "pop-punk equivalent to Greta Van Fleet's soulless imitations of Led Zeppelin".

== Accolades ==
=== Awards and nominations ===
Baker took home the award for Top Rock Album at the 2021 Billboard Music Awards and at the iHeartRadio Music Awards for the Alternate-Rock Album of the Year. Tickets to My Downfall did not receive any nominations from the academy for the Grammy Awards, fans showed their support for the album over Twitter following a tweet from Baker, as fans and Baker argued that the album should have been included in the nominations list. This follows further backlash from the public directed towards the Grammy's as notable artists such as Halsey, The Weeknd, Fiona Apple, and BTS were not included in the nomination list, with the #Scammys trending on Twitter.

List of awards and nominations received by Tickets to my Downfall
Year	Award	Category	Result	Ref.
2021	ARIA Music Awards	Best International Artist	Nominated	
2021	Billboard Music Awards	Top Rock Album	Won	
2021	iHeartRadio Music Awards	Alternate-Rock Album of the Year	Won	

=== Year-end lists ===
Numerous critics and publications listed Tickets to My Downfall in their year-end ranking of the best albums of 2020.

Select year-end rankings of Tickets to My Downfall
Publication/critic	Accolade	Rank	Ref.
Alternative Press	50 Best Albums of 2020	-	
Billboard	50 Best Albums of 2020: Staff Picks	19	
Billboard	25 Best Rock Albums of 2020: Staff Picks	2	
Kerrang!	50 greatest albums of 2020	9	
Punktastic	Top 25 Albums of 2020	13	
The Ringer	The Best Albums of 2020	8	

== Commercial performance and legacy ==
Tickets to My Downfall debuted at number one on the US Billboard 200 all-format albums chart, moving 126,000 album equivalent units in its first week. It became his first number one album, tripling the opening numbers for his prior album, Hotel Diablo in 2019, and made it the first rock album to top the chart in just over a year, since Tool's album Fear Inoculum in September 2019. It became the fifth longest charting album on Billboard's Top Rock Albums history after spending thirteen weeks in the number one spot. The album was confirmed to have just sold over 200,000 copies in pure album sales, as of April 8, 2022. The album received a two-times platinum certification in the United States RIAA with 2 million units sold.

In Australia, the album debuted and peaked at number two on the ARIA Albums Chart for the chart dated 5 October 2020, held off from the number one position by Joji's Nectar. The following week, the album fell three positions to number five.

In Canada, the album debuted at number one on the Canadian Albums Chart for the chart dated 10 October 2020. The album was confirmed to have sold over 49,000 units by 13 July 2021. The album was awarded a double-platinum certification by Music Canada, signifying over 160,000 units sold.

The popularity of the album began a pop punk revival in the 2020s. The Evening Standard credited the album as "bridg[ing] the gap" between the modern pop punk scene and the mainstream interest that developed from the emo rap scene.

== Track listing ==
Standard edition
No.	Title	Writer(s)	Producer(s)	Length
1.	"Title Track"	Colson Baker; Nicholas Alex Long; Travis Barker; Omer Fedi	Barker; Machine Gun Kelly^{[a]}; Fedi^{[a]}	2:45
2.	"Kiss Kiss"	Baker; Long; Barker; Fedi	Barker; Fedi^{[a]}	2:18
3.	"Drunk Face"	Baker; Long; Nick Mira; Barker; Fedi	Barker; Mira; Machine Gun Kelly; Fedi	2:23
4.	"Bloody Valentine"	Baker; Derek Ryan Smith; Long; Barker	Barker	3:25
5.	"Forget Me Too" (featuring Halsey)	Baker; Ashley Frangipane; Long; Barker; Fedi	Barker; Fedi^{[a]}	2:51
6.	"All I Know" (featuring Trippie Redd)	Baker; Michael White IV; Long; Barker; Fedi; Andrew DeCaro; Aldae; Ibarra; Nick Bailey; Jesse Michaels^{[c]}; Tim Armstrong^{[c]}; Matt Freeman^{[c]}; Dave Mello^{[c]}	Barker; Fedi^{[a]}	2:09
7.	"Lonely"	Baker; Long; Barker	Barker; Machine Gun Kelly^{[a]}	3:10
8.	"WWIII"	Baker; Long; Barker	Barker	0:59
9.	"Kevin and Barracuda" (Interlude)	Baker; Pete Davidson		1:23
10.	"Concert for Aliens"	Baker; Long; Barker	Barker	2:40
11.	"My Ex's Best Friend" (featuring Blackbear)	Baker; Matthew Musto; Long; Barker	Barker; BazeXX^{[b]}; SlimXX^{[b]}	2:18
12.	"Jawbreaker"	Baker; Long; Barker	Barker	1:57
13.	"Nothing Inside" (featuring Iann Dior)	Baker; Michael Ian Olmo; Golden Von Jones; Long; Barker; Fedi	Barker; Fedi^{[a]}	2:52
14.	"Banyan Tree" (Interlude)	Baker; Megan Fox; Barker	Barker; Keith Varon	1:31
15.	"Play This When I'm Gone"	Baker; Long; Barker; Jackson Morgan; Jared Scharff	Barker; Scharff^{[b]}	3:22
Total length:				36:00

"Sold Out" Deluxe edition bonus tracks
No.	Title	Writer(s)	Producer(s)	Length
16.	"Body Bag" (featuring Yungblud and Bert McCracken of the Used)	Baker; Dominic Harrison; Bert McCracken; Chris Greatti; Zakk Cervini; Long; Barker; Fedi	Barker	2:50
17.	"Hangover Cure"	Baker; Jae Green; Long; Barker	Barker	2:40
18.	"Split a Pill"	Baker; Matt Malpass; Long; Barker	Barker	2:46
19.	"Can't Look Back"	Baker; Long; Barker; Fedi	Barker; Fedi^{[b]}	2:10
20.	"Misery Business" (Paramore cover)	Hayley Williams; Josh Farro	Barker; Machine Gun Kelly; Fedi; BazeXX	3:21
21.	"Bloody Valentine" (Acoustic)	Baker; Smith; Long; Barker	Barker	3:16
Total length:				53:12

"All Access" fifth anniversary edition bonus tracks
No.	Title	Writer(s)	Producer(s)	Length
22.	"No Cell Phones in Rehab"	Barker; Machine Gun Kelly	Barker	2:33
23.	"Home Bittersweet Home"	Barker; Long; Machine Gun Kelly	Barker	3:13
24.	"I Tried Again"	Barker; Long; Machine Gun Kelly	Barker	2:56
25.	"Me or You"	Barker; Machine Gun Kelly	Barker	2:39
26.	"Secrets"	SlimXX; Long; Machine Gun Kelly; Emma Rosen; BazeXX; Andrew Migliore	SlimXX; Long; Migliore	2:56
27.	"Love Race" (featuring Kellin Quinn)	Machine Gun Kelly; Barker; Jared Gutstadt; Geoff Warburton; Jeff Peters; Matt Thiessen	Barker; Jared Gutstadt; Jeff Peters	3:08
Total length:				70:46

Target edition bonus tracks
No.	Title	Writer(s)	Producer(s)	Length
16.	"Misery Business" (Paramore cover)	Williams; Farro	Barker; Machine Gun Kelly; Fedi; BazeXX	3:21
17.	"Roll the Windows Up"	Baker; Michael Posner; Ladonnis Crump; Sean Anderson; Brandon Allen; Stephen Basil	BazeXX; SlimXX	2:25
18.	"In These Walls (My House)" (with Pvris)	Baker; Lyndsey Gunnulfsen; Alex Babinski; Brian Macdonald; Kyle Anthony; Basil; Allen; Tim Norton	Machine Gun Kelly; BazeXX; SlimXX; Wavy Duber	2:48
19.	"Love on the Brain" (Rihanna cover)	Fred Ball; Joseph Angel; Robyn Fenty	Fedi; BazeXX; SlimXX	2:22
Total length:				46:56

Japanese edition bonus tracks
No.	Title	Writer(s)	Producer(s)	Length
16.	"Bloody Valentine" (Acoustic)	Baker; Smith; Long; Barker	Barker	3:16
17.	"Misery Business" (Paramore cover)	Williams; Farro	Barker; Machine Gun Kelly; Fedi; BazeXX	3:21
18.	"Love on the Brain" (Rihanna cover)	Ball; Angel; Fenty	Fedi; BazeXX; SlimXX	2:22
Total length:				45:09

Note

- Track titles are stylized in all lowercase, with the exception of "WWIII". However, all physical copies render the tracklist in all uppercase.
- ^{^[a]} signifies a co-producer
- ^{^[b]} signifies an additional producer
- ^{^[c]} "All I Know" contains an interpolation of "Knowledge", written by Jesse Michaels, Tim Armstrong, Matt Freeman, and Dave Mello, and performed by Operation Ivy.

== Personnel ==
Credits adapted from Tidal and the album's liner notes.

Musicians

- Colson Baker – vocals (all tracks), guitar (1, 2, 4, 10, 15)
- Travis Barker – drums (all tracks), keyboards (1), piano (1, 7, 12, 15), guitar (5), drum programming (6, 11, 13), synthesizer (12, 14), bass (14), programming (15)
- Kevin Thrasher – background vocals (1)
- Kevin Bivona – Hammond organ (1, 2), bass (2, 5, 7, 12), guitar (5), piano (3, 4, 5), synthesizer (4, 5, 13)
- Omer Fedi – bass guitar (1–3, 5, 6, 11–13), guitar (1–3, 5, 6, 11)
- Nick Long – guitar (1, 3–8, 10, 12, 13), bass (4)
- Halsey – vocals (5)
- Trippie Redd – vocals (6)
- Blackbear – vocals (11)
- Iann Dior – vocals (13)
- Keith Varon – guitar (14)
- Jared Scharff – guitar (15)
- Johan Lenox – strings (15)
- Bert McCracken – vocals (16)
- Yungblud – vocals (16)
- RookXX – drums (26)
- Emma Rosen – backing vocals (26)
- No Love for the Middle Child – synthesizer, keyboards (26)
- BazeXX – bass (26)
- SlimXX – synthesizer, keyboards (26)
- Kellin Quinn – vocals (27)

Technical

- Chris Gehringer – mastering engineer (1–3, 5–9, 12–15)
- Colin Leonard – mastering engineer (4, 10, 11)
- Adam Hawkins – mixer (1–3, 5–10, 12–15)
- Neal Avron – mixer (4)
- Serban Ghenea – mixer (11)
- Kevin Thrasher – engineer (1–3, 5–8, 13)
- John Hanes – mix engineer (11)
- Scott Skrzynski – assistant mixer (4)

Artwork

- Terry Urban – album artwork, design
- Colson Baker – art concept
- Justin Campbell – photography
- Daniel Rojas – photography

== Charts ==
=== Weekly charts ===
Chart performance for Tickets to My Downfall
Chart (2020)	Peak position
Australian Albums (ARIA)	2
Austrian Albums (Ö3 Austria)	5
Belgian Albums (Ultratop Flanders)	16
Belgian Albums (Ultratop Wallonia)	75
Canadian Albums (Billboard)	1
Czech Albums (ČNS IFPI)	2
Danish Albums (Hitlisten)	20
Dutch Albums (Album Top 100)	19
Finnish Albums (Suomen virallinen lista)	12
French Albums (SNEP)	111
German Albums (Offizielle Top 100)	11
Hungarian Albums (MAHASZ)	35
Irish Albums (Official Charts)	7
Italian Albums (FIMI)	13
New Zealand Albums (RMNZ)	5
Norwegian Albums (VG-lista)	10
Scottish Albums (Official Charts)	6
Slovak Albums (ČNS IFPI)	4
Spanish Albums (PROMUSICAE)	42
Swedish Albums (Sverigetopplistan)	11
Swiss Albums (Schweizer Hitparade)	24
UK Albums (Official Charts)	3
UK Rock & Metal Albums (Official Charts)	2
US Billboard 200	1
US Top Rock Albums (Billboard)	1
US Top Alternative Albums (Billboard)	1
US Vinyl Albums (Billboard)	4

Chart (2026)	Peak position
German Rock & Metal Albums (Offizielle Top 100)	3

=== Year-end charts ===
2020 year-end chart performance for Tickets to My Downfall
Chart (2020)	Position
US Billboard 200	154
US Top Rock Albums (Billboard)	22

2021 year-end chart performance for Tickets to My Downfall
Chart (2021)	Position
Australian Albums (ARIA)	56
Austrian Albums (Ö3 Austria)	36
Belgian Albums (Ultratop Flanders)	146
Canadian Albums (Billboard)	21
UK Albums (OCC)	82
US Billboard 200	24
US Top Rock Albums (Billboard)	2

2022 year-end chart performance for Tickets to My Downfall
Chart (2022)	Position
US Billboard 200	123
US Top Rock Albums (Billboard)	20

== Certifications ==
Certifications for Tickets to My Downfall
Region	Certification	Certified units/sales
Canada (Music Canada)	2× Platinum	160,000^{‡}
Denmark (IFPI Danmark)	Gold	10,000^{‡}
Hungary (MAHASZ)	Platinum	4,000^{‡}
Italy (FIMI)	Gold	25,000^{‡}
Poland (ZPAV)	Gold	10,000^{‡}
United Kingdom (BPI)	Gold	100,000^{‡}
United States (RIAA)	2× Platinum	2,000,000^{‡}
^{‡} Sales+streaming figures based on certification alone.

== See also ==
- "Love Race" - a 2021 non-album single noted to be in the same vein of the album
