= My Ex's Best Friend =

2020 single by Machine Gun Kelly featuring Blackbear

Single by Machine Gun Kelly featuring Blackbear

from the album Tickets to My Downfall
- Released: August 7, 2020
- Recorded: 2019
- Genre: Pop-punk
- Length: 2:19
- Label: Bad Boy; Interscope
- Songwriters: Colson Baker; Matthew Musto; Nicholas Alex Long; Travis Barker
- Producer: Travis Barker

Machine Gun Kelly singles chronology
"Concert for Aliens" (2020)	"My Ex's Best Friend" (2020)	"Acting Like That" (2020)

Blackbear singles chronology
"Queen of Broken Hearts" (2020)	"My Ex's Best Friend" (2020)	"Hard on Yourself" (2020)

Music video
- "My Ex's Best Friend" on YouTube

"My Ex's Best Friend" (stylized in all lowercase) is a song by American musician Machine Gun Kelly featuring fellow American musician Blackbear. It is the third single off of the former's pop-punk fifth studio album Tickets to My Downfall. The song reached number 20 on the US Billboard Hot 100 chart, becoming the third top-40 hit for both artists.

== Background and release ==
Colson Baker, better known as Machine Gun Kelly, released his fourth studio album, Hotel Diablo, on July 5, 2019, via EST 19XX, Bad Boy, and Interscope Records. The third single from that album, "I Think I'm Okay", was a collaboration with Yungblud and Travis Barker, which served as a segue for Baker's transition towards rock music. Baker described the song as "our first 'Oh shit. I think we might be onto something' moment". Baker booked a studio session with Barker, recording what would become the song "Bloody Valentine". Machine Gun Kelly describes the session as "so powerful that Travis was like, 'Fuck it, I'm blocking off two months of my life and we're doing this album'". On December 4, 2019, Machine Gun Kelly tweeted, "rock album in 2020".

Baker first collaborated with Blackbear on "End of the Road", the final track on Baker's 2012 debut album Lace Up. Both artists made a guest appearance on "Shoot'Em Down", from Mod Sun's 2015 album Look Up. In 2017, Machine Gun Kelly appeared as a featured vocalist on Blackbear's track "E.Z.", from his album Cybersex. Baker teased another collaboration with Blackbear in December 2019, posting a screenshot of their text conversation on his Instagram account, with the caption, "ayy the @bear vocals came in". "My Ex's Best Friend" was officially released on August 7, 2020.

This song is featured as a DLC in Fuser, released on June 15, 2021,

== Composition and themes ==
The song was described as pop punk, but as a modern take on it, rather than the "classic" form of the genre. Publications described it as a "guitar-laden" song with the two singers covering the complications of relationship breakups and rebound relationships. The song's "infectious guitar line" has been noted as being one of the most memorable moments on the Tickets to My Downfall album.

== Reception ==
HotNewHipHop praised the song, but noted that the enjoyment the listener gets would vary based on their attitude on the music's new sound, stating "If you're not on board for MGK's departure from hip-hop... you'll likely hit skip within the opening moments of [the song]. For those who decide to stay, you'll be treated to a tale of forbidden passion, the likes of which have fueled pop-punk balladry for years."

In an otherwise negative review of Tickets to My Downfall, Sputnikmusic contended that while he felt it is not a good song by any means, it makes an effort to experiment and amalgamate pop-punk riffs with his familiar rap sensibilities.

== Accolades ==
Awards and nominations for "My Ex's Best Friend"
Year	Organization	Award	Result	Ref(s)
2021	Billboard Music Awards	Top Rock Song	Nominated	
2021	MTV Video Music Awards	Best Alternative	Won	
2022	iHeartRadio Music Awards	Alternative Rock Song of the Year	Nominated	

== Live performances ==
On August 30, 2020, Machine Gun Kelly and Blackbear performed "My Ex's Best Friend" live at the 2020 MTV Video Music Awards.

Machine Gun Kelly also performed this song on the September 25th episode of The Kelly Clarkson Show, a day after he made an appearance on the show the day before. MGK performed it during the 2020 American Music Awards on November 22, and on New Year's Eve during Dick Clark's New Year's Rockin' Eve 2021 with Ryan Seacrest. Coincidentally, both events were produced by Dick Clark Productions and aired on ABC.

He also performed the song on the January 30th episode of NBC’s Saturday Night Live, which was hosted by John Krasinski.

== Personnel ==
Credits adapted from Tidal.

- Machine Gun Kelly – vocals
- Blackbear – vocals
- Travis Barker – production
- BazeXX – additional production
- SlimXX – additional production
- Omer Fedi – bass guitar, guitar
- Nick Long – guitar
- Colin Leonard – master engineering
- John Hanes – mix engineering
- Serban Ghenea – mixing

== Charts ==
=== Weekly charts ===
Weekly chart performance for "My Ex's Best Friend"
Chart (2020–21)	Peak position
Australia (ARIA)	22
Austria (Ö3 Austria Top 40)	47
Belgium (Ultratip Bubbling Under Wallonia)	37
Canada Hot 100 (Billboard)	26
Canada CHR/Top 40 (Billboard)	14
Canada Hot AC (Billboard)	42
Canada Rock (Billboard)	20
Czech Republic Airplay (ČNS IFPI)	10
Czech Republic Singles Digital (ČNS IFPI)	24
Germany (GfK)	68
Global 200 (Billboard)	25
Ireland (IRMA)	34
New Zealand Hot Singles (RMNZ)	6
Paraguay Anglo (Monitor Latino)	11
Portugal (AFP)	133
Puerto Rico Anglo (Monitor Latino)	13
Scotland Singles (OCC)	65
Slovakia Singles Digital (ČNS IFPI)	69
Sweden Heatseeker (Sverigetopplistan)	15
UK Singles (OCC)	30
UK Hip Hop/R&B (OCC)	22
US Billboard Hot 100	20
US Hot Rock & Alternative Songs (Billboard)	2
US Rock & Alternative Airplay (Billboard)	2
US Adult Pop Airplay (Billboard)	6
US Pop Airplay (Billboard)	3

=== Year-end charts ===
Yar-end chart performance for "My Ex's Best Friend"
Chart (2020)	Position
US Hot Rock & Alternative Songs (Billboard)	10

Chart (2021)	Position
Australia (ARIA)	97
Global 200 (Billboard)	105
US Billboard Hot 100	23
US Hot Rock & Alternative Songs (Billboard)	4
US Rock Airplay (Billboard)	2
US Adult Top 40 (Billboard)	21
US Mainstream Top 40 (Billboard)	16

== Certifications ==
Certifications for "My Ex's Best Friend"
Region	Certification	Certified units/sales
Australia (ARIA)	Platinum	70,000^{‡}
Brazil (Pro-Música Brasil)	Platinum	40,000^{‡}
Canada (Music Canada)	6× Platinum	480,000^{‡}
Denmark (IFPI Danmark)	Gold	45,000^{‡}
Germany (BVMI)	Gold	200,000^{‡}
Italy (FIMI)	Gold	35,000^{‡}
New Zealand (RMNZ)	Platinum	30,000^{‡}
Portugal (AFP)	Gold	5,000^{‡}
United Kingdom (BPI)	Platinum	600,000^{‡}
United States (RIAA)	3× Platinum	3,000,000^{‡}
^{‡} Sales+streaming figures based on certification alone.

== Release history ==
Country	Date	Format	Label	Ref.
Various	August 7, 2020	Digital download; streaming	Bad Boy; Interscope	
Italy	September 25, 2020	Contemporary hit radio	Universal	
United Kingdom	October 2, 2020	Contemporary hit radio	Universal	
United States	October 13, 2020	Contemporary hit radio	Interscope	
