= Lost Americana =

Studio album by MGK
- Released: August 8, 2025
- Genres: Rock; heartland rock; pop-punk
- Length: 45:19
- Labels: Floor 13; EST 19XX; Interscope
- Producers: Travis Barker; BazeXX; MGK; LOVEONFRIDAY; Nick Long; No Love for the Middle Child; phem; SlimXX; Vino Tarantino

MGK chronology
| Genre: Sadboy (2024) | Lost Americana (2025) | Blog Era Boyz (2026) |

Singles from Lost Americana
- 1. "Cliché" Released: May 23, 2025; 2. "Vampire Diaries" Released: July 11, 2025; 3. "Miss Sunshine" Released: July 25, 2025

Lost Americana is the seventh studio album by American musician, singer, and songwriter MGK. It was released on August 8, 2025, through Floor 13, EST 19XX, and Interscope Records, as the follow-up to his previous album, Mainstream Sellout (2022). The album was preceded by three singles: "Cliché", "Vampire Diaries", and "Miss Sunshine".

== Background and release ==
The album's official trailer, released shortly after, was narrated by Bob Dylan—a surprising collaboration that generated widespread media attention due to Dylan's elusive public persona. This prompted Vice to speculate whether Dylan might be experiencing dementia and could soon opt for assisted suicide. The narration comes soon after revealing he was a fan of MGK's music. While speculation initially surrounded whether the voice was authentic or AI-generated, multiple sources confirmed Dylan's genuine involvement, noting his social media promotion of the trailer. The album was recorded with long-time collaborators Nick Long, Stephen Basil and Brandon Allen.

The album's lead single, "Cliché", was released on May 23, 2025. The album's second single, "Vampire Diaries", was released on July 11, 2025, accompanied by a music video filmed at the Natural History Museum of Los Angeles County. The third single, "Miss Sunshine", was released on July 25, 2025, accompanied by a music video.

== Composition ==
=== Music ===
The album includes influences from rock, pop, punk rock, and rap genres. The opening "Outlaw Overture" is divided into two parts: the first-half opens with '80s new wave synth lines and transitions into an acoustic guitar ballad. "Starman" interpolates the chorus from "Semi-Charmed Life" by Third Eye Blind. The frontman for the band, Stephan Jenkins, invited MGK over to his house in Malibu, but because of the Palisades Fire earlier that year, the National Guard was restricting visitors to the neighborhood. MGK told the National Guard member that he was a "big rockstar" going to another rockstar's house to get a sample cleared for his new album, and the guard member let him through.

=== Lyrics and themes ===
Lost Americana explores themes of family, friendship, and addiction, and serves as a metaphor for MGK's life. The lyrics contain numerous references to MGK's family life. "Indigo" features lyrics about balancing family and work, with MGK singing, "Put my newborn daughter to bed at eight / Then I'm back on the interstate." The track "Treading Water" features the lyrics "I broke this home / But I'll change for our daughter so she's not alone" and reference MGK's most recent trip to rehab. In "Orpheus", MGK compares himself to the character from Greek mythology who travels to the Underworld to fight for his lost wife, but loses himself in the process, seemingly referencing his relationship with Megan Fox, who co-wrote the song. On "Tell Me What's Up", MGK sings about his friends who died before the age of 30.

=== Songs ===
"Sweet Coraline" was written based on an interaction MGK had while in New York City. MGK was outside smoking a cigarette when he was approached by a foreign fan. She was standing in the road, and a taxi almost hit her. MGK pulled her out of the street. The fan then told him that she and her friends had been sitting in the cafe across the street, debating if it was MGK outside. The fan asked MGK if she could ask him a question, and when he agreed, she asked, "How did you fumble Megan Fox?" MGK responded "Goddamn." MGK later told his friend and producer, Travis Barker, about the moment. Barker encouraged MGK to turn the moment into a song. The song was named after the 2009 film, Coraline.

In "Orpheus", the final track on the album, MGK compares himself to the Greek mythological character who travels to the Underworld to fight for his lost wife, Eurydice. Ultimately, Orpheus loses himself in the process. The song was co-written with MGK's partner, Megan Fox.

== Critical reception ==
Professional ratings
Aggregate scores
| Source | Rating |
|---|---|
| Metacritic | 56/100 |
Review scores
| Source | Rating |
| AllMusic | 1.5/5 stars |
| Pitchfork | 5.6/10 |
| PopMatters | 7/10 |
| Rolling Stone | 3/5 stars |
| Slant Magazine | 4/5 stars |

Lost Americana received generally mixed reviews from music critics. At Metacritic, which assigns a normalized rating out of 100 to reviews from mainstream critics, the album received an average score of 56, which indicates "mixed or average reviews", based on 5 reviews.

Paul Attard of Slant Magazine praised MGK for developing his "melodic register" and songwriting talents, and putting focus in his genre-mashing to give the album a "balance of intimacy and spectacle" with "pacing and rich emotional range", concluding that: "Lost Americana moves with the assuredness of an artist who's wrestled with his demons, refined his tools, and emerged with something that commands attention on its own terms." Matthew Dwyer of PopMatters wrote that "Lost Americana lives up to its title by combining pop-punk with acoustic elements, mirroring the shift of American pop music from folk rock in the 1970s to synth-pop in the 1980s: both changes that sacrifice authenticity for glamour." Pitchfork writer Drew Millard was critical of MGK utilizing "rote songwriting and borrowed melodies" from the "great modern rock songbook" to craft a blurry gaze into his personal life, but said: "there's something about mgk's dedication to the bit, his quality-agnostic enthusiasm for the idea of popular rock music as a form, and the brutal honesty he embeds within its nonsense that makes it genuinely fascinating to listen to, and at times even successful when you take it on its own terms."

== Commercial performance ==
Lost Americana debuted at number four on the US Billboard 200, including atop the Top Rock & Alternative Albums charts selling 63,000 album-equivalent units.

== Track listing ==
Lost Americana track listing
| No. | Title | Writer(s) | Producer(s) | Length |
|---|---|---|---|---|
| 1. | "Outlaw Overture" | Colson Baker | SlimXX; BazeXX; Nick Long; No Love for the Middle Child | 5:02 |
| 2. | "Cliché" | Baker; Andrew Migliore; Emma Rosen | BazeXX; Long; MGK; No Love for the Middle Child; SlimXX | 2:56 |
| 3. | "Don't Wait Run Fast" | Baker; Long; Rosen | BazeXX; Long; No Love for the Middle Child; SlimXX | 3:12 |
| 4. | "Goddamn" | Baker; Long | SlimXX; BazeXX; Long; MGK; No Love for the Middle Child | 3:07 |
| 5. | "Vampire Diaries" | Baker | Travis Barker; BazeXX; Long; No Love for the Middle Child; SlimXX | 2:35 |
| 6. | "Miss Sunshine" | Baker; Rosen | BazeXX; Long; No Love for the Middle Child; SlimXX | 3:23 |
| 7. | "Sweet Coraline" | Baker | Barker; BazeXX; Long; No Love for the Middle Child; SlimXX | 2:41 |
| 8. | "Indigo" | Baker; Phem | phem; BazeXX; Long; No Love for the Middle Child; SlimXX; LOVEONFRIDAY; Vino Tarantino | 3:11 |
| 9. | "Starman" | Brandon Allen; Baker; Stephan Jenkins | Barker; BazeXX; Long; MGK; No Love for the Middle Child; SlimXX | 3:37 |
| 10. | "Tell Me What's Up" | Baker | SlimXX; BazeXX; No Love for the Middle Child | 3:52 |
| 11. | "Can't Stay Here" | Long; Rosen; Baker | BazeXX; Long; MGK; No Love for the Middle Child; SlimXX | 3:27 |
| 12. | "Treading Water" | Baker; Derek Smith | BazeXX; Long; No Love for the Middle Child; SlimXX | 3:42 |
| 13. | "Orpheus" | Baker; Megan Fox | BazeXX; Long; No Love for the Middle Child; SlimXX | 4:34 |
| Total length: | | | | 45:19 |

Reissue on 10th January 2026
| No. | Title | Writer(s) | Producer(s) | Length |
|---|---|---|---|---|
| 14. | "Times Of My Life" | Barker; Baker; Long; Jacob Kasher | Barker; BazeXX; Long; No Love for the Middle Child; SlimXX | 2:49 |
| Total length: | | | | 48:08 |

=== Notes ===
- All track titles are stylized in lowercase.
- "Can't Stay Here", "Tell Me What's Up", and "Don't Wait Run Fast" are stylized with no apostrophes.
- "Don't Wait Run Fast" is listed as "Run Rebel Run" on CD and vinyl copies of the album.
- "Starman" contains an interpolation of "Semi-Charmed Life", written by Stephan Jenkins for his band Third Eye Blind.
- "Miss Sunshine" features an alternate second verse on CD and vinyl copies of the album.

== Personnel ==
Credits adapted from Apple Music and Tidal.

=== Musicians ===
- Colson "MGK" Baker – vocals (all), guitar (2, 6, 7, 10, 11, 13, 14)
- Stephen "BazeXX" Basil – bass (all), Hammond organ (5, 6), drum programming (10), piano (1, 4, 5, 10-12, 14)
- Nick Long – guitar (1-3, 4, 5-7, 9–14), background vocals (1, 4, 5, 7–14)
- Andrew "No Love for the Middle Child" Migliore – background vocals (1, 3-6, 7, 9-14), synthesizer (1–12), drum programming (8, 12), guitar (1-12), acoustic guitar (12), cello (13, 14)
- Emma Rosen – background vocals (2-6, 9-13)
- Sterling Mitchell Laws – drums (1–4, 6, 9)
- Terrace Martin – synthesizer (3)
- Brandon "SlimXX" Allen – synthesizer (4, 5, 7–10), keyboards (5, 6, 10, 11), drum programming (10)
- Travis Barker – drums (5, 7, 9, 11, 14)
- Rook Capelletty – drums (3, 6, 12)
- Olivia "phem" Marsico – additional vocals (8)
- Derek "Mod Sun" Smith – acoustic guitar (11), additional vocals (12)
- Jon Batiste – piano (13)

=== Technical ===
- Shaan Singh – engineering (all), vocal production (2, 4, 11–14)
- Jeremy Hatcher – engineering (1–10, 11, 13)
- Adam Hawkins – mixing (4)
- Lars Stalfors – mixing (1–3, 5–14)
- Serban Ghenea – mixing (2)
- Idania Valencia – mastering

== Charts ==
Chart performance for Lost Americana
| Chart (2025) | Peak position |
|---|---|
| Australian Albums (ARIA) | 3 |
| Austrian Albums (Ö3 Austria) | 3 |
| Belgian Albums (Ultratop Flanders) | 4 |
| Belgian Albums (Ultratop Wallonia) | 55 |
| Canadian Albums (Billboard) | 9 |
| Dutch Albums (Album Top 100) | 7 |
| French Albums (SNEP) | 61 |
| French Rock & Metal Albums (SNEP) | 4 |
| German Albums (Offizielle Top 100) | 2 |
| German Rock & Metal Albums (Offizielle Top 100) | 1 |
| Irish Albums (Official Charts) | 30 |
| Italian Albums (FIMI) | 26 |
| Japanese Digital Albums (Oricon) | 36 |
| Japanese Download Albums (Billboard) | 30 |
| New Zealand Albums (RMNZ) | 8 |
| Polish Albums (ZPAV) | 42 |
| Portuguese Albums (AFP) | 104 |
| Scottish Albums (Official Charts) | 3 |
| Swiss Albums (Schweizer Hitparade) | 6 |
| UK Albums (Official Charts) | 2 |
| US Billboard 200 | 4 |
| US Top Rock & Alternative Albums (Billboard) | 1 |
