= Forget Me Too =

Song by Machine Gun Kelly featuring Halsey

from the album Tickets to My Downfall
- Released: September 25, 2020
- Genre: Pop punk
- Length: 2:51
- Label: Interscope
- Songwriters: Colson Baker; Ashley Frangipane; Travis Barker
- Producer: Travis Barker

Music video
- "Forget Me Too" on YouTube

"Forget Me Too" (stylized in all lowercase) is a song by American musician Machine Gun Kelly. The song features guest vocals by American singer Halsey and drumming and production by Travis Barker. It is the fifth track on Machine Gun Kelly's fifth studio album Tickets to My Downfall (2020).

== Background ==
"Forget Me Too" is a collaboration between Machine Gun Kelly (vocals), Halsey (vocals), and Travis Barker (drumming and production). A collaboration between the three under the title had been rumored since June 2020, when the title was registered to Halsey's BMI registration. The song's existence was not confirmed until September 2020, and was not heard in any capacity until it was released on September 25, 2020, alongside the entirety of Machine Gun Kelly's fifth studio album Tickets to My Downfall. Shortly after its release, it was announced that a music video was being produced for the song as well, which was officially released on October 22, 2020.

Machine Gun Kelly recounted that the song came together relatively quickly, noting that it was probably the quickest feature recording session of his career. Barker recalled working on the song, and noting that its upbeat, energetic nature could be a good fit for Halsey. They sent her a work in progress version of the track that night, and by the next day, Halsey came to the studio to record her vocal part. The recording sessions for her part lasted 10 minutes and was completed in just two takes—an initial take, and a second take that was identical but higher in pitch, which was used in the final recording. Despite the quickness of the process, Halsey noted that it had taken them seven years to figure out the right way to collaborate.

== Themes and composition ==
The song was widely described as pop punk by publications, specifically in the style of the genre in the early 2000s. Machine Gun Kelly and Halsey alternate vocals in the song, with the song culminating with them singing the last chorus of the song together. The song's "energetic guitar" has been noted as being one of the most memorable moments on the Tickets To My Downfall album, showing off the frustration that both parties feel in the relationship.

== Reception ==
The song has been generally well received. Alternative Press noted that the song was one of the most popular off of Tickets to My Downfall, accumulating over 6 million streams in just four days on Spotify, outperforming most of Machine Gun Kelly's material on the platform. Kerrang! praised the song for successfully capturing "the energy and bounce of early 2000s pop punk to dazzling effect" and concluded that it was a "total banger".

== Personnel ==
- Machine Gun Kelly – vocals
- Halsey – vocals
- Travis Barker – drums, production
- Nick Long – guitar
- Kevin Bivona – bass

== Charts ==
=== Weekly charts ===
Weekly chart performance for "Forget Me Too"
Chart (2020–21)	Peak position
Australia (ARIA)	51
Austria (Ö3 Austria Top 40)	64
Belgium (Ultratip Bubbling Under Flanders)	18
Bolivia Anglo (Monitor Latino)	7
Canada Hot 100 (Billboard)	33
Czech Republic Singles Digital (ČNS IFPI)	39
Ireland (IRMA)	47
Global 200 (Billboard)	39
New Zealand Hot Singles (RMNZ)	4
Slovakia Singles Digital (ČNS IFPI)	86
UK Singles (OCC)	40
UK Rock & Metal (OCC)	1
US Billboard Hot 100	44
US Hot Rock & Alternative Songs (Billboard)	5
US Rolling Stone Top 100	15

=== Year-end charts ===
Year-end chart performance for "Forget Me Too"
Chart (2020)	Position
US Hot Rock & Alternative Songs (Billboard)	43

Chart (2021)	Position
US Hot Rock & Alternative Songs (Billboard)	32

== Certifications ==
Certifications for "Forget Me Too"
Region	Certification	Certified units/sales
Australia (ARIA)	Gold	35,000^{‡}
Brazil (Pro-Música Brasil)	Gold	20,000^{‡}
Canada (Music Canada)	2× Platinum	160,000^{‡}
New Zealand (RMNZ)	Gold	15,000^{‡}
United Kingdom (BPI)	Gold	400,000^{‡}
United States (RIAA)	Platinum	1,000,000^{‡}
^{‡} Sales+streaming figures based on certification alone.
