= Cliché (Machine Gun Kelly song) =

2025 single by Machine Gun Kelly

Single by MGK

from the album Lost Americana
- Released: May 23, 2025
- Genre: Pop
- Length: 2:56
- Label: EST 19XX; Interscope
- Songwriters: Colson Baker; Emma Rosen; Andrew Migliore
- Producers: MGK; SlimXX; BazeXX; Nick Long; No Love for the Middle Child

MGK singles chronology
"Iris" (2025)	"Cliché" (2025)	"Vampire Diaries" (2025)

Jonas Brothers singles chronology
"Coming Home This Christmas" (2025)	"Cliché" (Jonas Brothers remix) (2025)	"Listen When Sad" (2026)

Music video
- "Cliché" on YouTube

"Cliché" is a song by American musician, singer and songwriter MGK, released on May 23, 2025, through EST 19XX and Interscope Records as the lead single from his seventh studio album, Lost Americana (2025). MGK wrote the song with Emma Rosen and Andrew Migliore, and produced it with BazeXX, SlimXX, Nick Long and No Love for the Middle Child. A remix of the song in collaboration with American pop rock band Jonas Brothers was released on November 25, 2025.

== Background and composition ==
A few weeks before the song was released, MGK revealed in a freestyle over "Bye Bye Bye" by NSYNC that his next song would be in the pop genre. Upon its release, its sound was compared to the sound of 2000's pop music; Uproxx stated "On the scale of rap to pop punk, MGK's new song 'Cliché' falls closer to the Blink-182 side of things — with a lot of boy band dancing thrown in there, too. Think: a more earnest ''All the Small Things' music video'". Lyrically, MGK discusses his insecurities about love but is nevertheless willing to take a chance. He addresses an unnamed former partner as he sings, "Tell me, would you stay with me? / Maybe we could make this home / You should run away with me / Even if you're better off alone." It is believed that these lyrics are directed toward actress Megan Fox.

== Music video ==
The music video was directed by Sam Cahill and released alongside the single. Featuring choreography, it finds MGK dancing in a car wash, on the back of a moving truck and in a motel parking lot. The clip also contains a teaser of Lost Americana.

== Reception ==
The song received minor backlash among fans, especially regarding its pop aesthetic, with some believing that MGK was not suited to this musical style. MGK responded to one such comment, "Just tell me you're insecure. Tell me you found your girlfriend watching this music video without telling me. What is this? It's a pop song, man."

== Charts ==
=== Weekly charts ===
Weekly chart performance for "Cliché"
Chart (2025)	Peak position
Australia (ARIA)	45
Austria (Ö3 Austria Top 40)	42
Canada Hot 100 (Billboard)	41
Croatia International Airplay (Top lista)	33
Czech Republic Airplay (ČNS IFPI)	5
Estonia Airplay (TopHit)	95
Germany (GfK)	69
Global 200 (Billboard)	80
Ireland (IRMA)	61
Lithuania Airplay (TopHit)	40
New Zealand Hot Singles (RMNZ)	2
Poland (Polish Airplay Top 100)	12
San Marino Airplay (SMRTV Top 50)	34
Sweden Heatseeker (Sverigetopplistan)	2
UK Singles (Official Charts)	31
US Billboard Hot 100	62
US Adult Pop Airplay (Billboard)	33
US Hot Rock & Alternative Songs (Billboard)	10
US Pop Airplay (Billboard)	17

=== Monthly charts ===
Monthly chart performance for "Cliché"
Chart (2025)	Peak position
Estonia Airplay (TopHit)	94
Lithuania Airplay (TopHit)	87

=== Year-end charts ===
Year-end chart performance for "Cliché"
Chart (2025)	Position
US Hot Rock & Alternative Songs (Billboard)	22

== Certifications ==
Certifications for "Cliché"
Region	Certification	Certified units/sales
Canada (Music Canada)	Gold	40,000^{‡}
United Kingdom (BPI)	Silver	200,000^{‡}
^{‡} Sales+streaming figures based on certification alone.

== Release history ==
Release dates and formats for "Cliché"
Region	Date	Format	Label(s)	Ref.
United States	June 3, 2025	Contemporary hit radio	EST 19XX; Interscope	
