= Concert for Aliens =

Single by Machine Gun Kelly

from the album Tickets to My Downfall
- Released: August 5, 2020
- Recorded: 2019
- Genre: Pop-punk
- Length: 2:40
- Songwriters: Colson Baker; Nicholas Alex Long; Travis Barker
- Producer: Travis Barker

Machine Gun Kelly singles chronology
"Bloody Valentine" (2020)	"Concert for Aliens" (2020)	"My Ex's Best Friend" (2020)

"Concert for Aliens" (stylized in all lowercase) is a song by Machine Gun Kelly. It was released as the second single from his fifth studio album Tickets to My Downfall. It peaked at number 17 on the Billboard Hot Rock & Alternative Songs chart in 2020.

== Background ==
The song debuted live on the nationally televised show Good Morning America on July 20, 2020, when Machine Gun Kelly (Colson Baker) and drummer Travis Barker performed the track. The following day, Baker posted the clip to social media and confirmed that the song would be the second single from his upcoming fifth studio album Tickets to My Downfall. Multiple music videos were released for the song. On August 5, an animated video was released, featuring Baker and Barker trying to escape from aliens, which eventually transitions to them playing a concert for the aliens. A second video, directed by Mod Sun, was released on August 13, 2020. The video, make of live action footage, alternates between footage of Baker and Barker performing the song in front of a crowd of aliens, and footage of Baker dressed up and acting silly in a variety of costumes, including a game show host, an actor, a sailor, an emo teenager, and a stereotypical "villain" type character. The video received 250,000 views in the first three hours of availability alone.

== Themes and composition ==
Publications generally described the song as pop-punk. Pitchfork called it a faithful homage to Blink-182's Enema of the State. Despite the song's upbeat sound and humorous video, Baker noted that the song was meant to have a serious message, serving as a metaphor for the chaos and civil unrest present in the year 2020, with the song lyrics making allusions to the end of the world.

== Reception ==
AllMusic and Digital Journal considered the song a standout on Tickets to My Downfall. Wall of Sound called it an "absolute fucking anthem." Rock Sins called it a song Simple Plan would be grateful to still be able to write. Conversely, Sputnikmusic called the vocals overproduced and that Baker sings in a nasally baritone.

== Charts ==
=== Weekly charts ===
Chart (2020)	Peak position
US Bubbling Under Hot 100 (Billboard)	24
US Hot Rock & Alternative Songs (Billboard)	17

=== Year-end charts ===
Chart (2020)	Position
US Hot Rock & Alternative Songs (Billboard)	83

== Certifications ==
Region	Certification	Certified units/sales
United States (RIAA)	Gold	500,000^{‡}
^{‡} Sales+streaming figures based on certification alone.

== Personnel ==
Credits adapted from Tidal.

- Machine Gun Kelly – vocals, guitar
- Travis Barker – production
- Nick Long – guitar
- Colin Leonard – master engineering
- Adam Hawkins – mixing

== Release history ==
Country	Date	Format	Label	Ref.
Various	August 5, 2020	Digital download; streaming	Bad Boy; Interscope	
Italy	September 4, 2020	Contemporary hit radio	Universal	
