= Billboard Music Award for Top Rock Album =

Annual American music award

The Billboard Music Award for Top Rock Album winners and nominees. Coldplay, Imagine Dragons, Mumford & Sons, and Twenty One Pilots have won the award twice.

== Winners and nominees ==
Winners are listed first and highlighted in bold.

=== 2000s ===
Year	Album	Artist	Ref.
2006	**All the Right Reasons**	**Nickelback**	
2006	Back to Bedlam	James Blunt	
2006	Stadium Arcadium	Red Hot Chili Peppers	
2007-09	—N/a		

=== 2010s ===
Year	Album	Artist	Ref.
2010	—N/a		
2011	**Sigh No More**	**Mumford & Sons**	
2011	Born Free	Kid Rock	
2011	To the Sea	Jack Johnson	
2011	Brothers	The Black Keys	
2011	A Thousand Suns	Linkin Park	
2012	**Mylo Xyloto**	**Coldplay**	
2012	Torches	Foster the People	
2012	Wasting Light	Foo Fighters	
2012	Here and Now	Nickelback	
2012	Sigh No More	Mumford & Sons	
2013	**Babel**	**Mumford & Sons**	
2013	Some Nights	Fun	
2013	The Lumineers	The Lumineers	
2013	My Head Is an Animal	Of Monsters and Men	
2013	The World from the Side of the Moon	Phillip Phillips	
2014	**Night Visions**	**Imagine Dragons**	
2014	Born to Die	Lana Del Rey	
2014	Save Rock and Roll	Fall Out Boy	
2014	Pure Heroine	Lorde	
2014	Babel	Mumford & Sons	
2015	**Ghost Stories**	**Coldplay**	
2015	Rock or Bust	AC/DC	
2015	Turn Blue	The Black Keys	
2015	Hozier	Hozier	
2015	Pure Heroine	Lorde	
2016	**Blurryface**	**Twenty One Pilots**	
2016	Sound & Color	Alabama Shakes	
2016	Blackstar	David Bowie	
2016	A Head Full of Dreams	Coldplay	
2016	Wilder Mind	Mumford & Sons	
2017	**Hardwired... to Self-Destruct**	**Metallica**	
2017	A Moon Shaped Pool	Radiohead	
2017	Blurryface	Twenty One Pilots	
2017	Cleopatra	The Lumineers	
2017	The Getaway	Red Hot Chili Peppers	
2018	**Evolve**	**Imagine Dragons**	
2018	Death of a Bachelor	Panic! at the Disco	
2018	One More Light	Linkin Park	
2018	Songs of Experience	U2	
2018	Woodstock	Portugal. The Man	
2019	**Pray For The Wicked**	**Panic! at the Disco**	
2019	Come Tomorrow	Dave Matthews Band	
2019	Origins	Imagine Dragons	
2019	Delta	Mumford & Sons	
2019	Trench	Twenty One Pilots	

=== 2020s ===
Year	Album	Artist	Ref.
2020	**Fear Inoculum**	**Tool**	
2020	III	The Lumineers	
2020	We Are Not Your Kind	Slipknot	
2020	The Slow Rush	Tame Impala	
2020	Father of the Bride	Vampire Weekend	
2021	**Tickets to My Downfall**	**Machine Gun Kelly**	
2021	Power Up	AC/DC	
2021	Plastic Hearts	Miley Cyrus	
2021	Dreamland	Glass Animals	
2021	Letter to You	Bruce Springsteen	
2022	**Scaled and Icy**	**Twenty One Pilots**	
2022	OK Orchestra	AJR	
2022	Music of the Spheres	Coldplay	
2022	Mercury – Act 1	Imagine Dragons	
2022	Sob Rock	John Mayer	
2023	**American Heartbreak**	**Zach Bryan**	
2023	The Mockingbird & the Crow	Hardy	
2023	Whitsitt Chapel	Jelly Roll	
2023	Stick Season	Noah Kahan	
2023	Gemini Rights	Steve Lacy	
2024	**Stick Season**	**Noah Kahan**	
2024	The Great American Bar Scene	Zach Bryan	
2024	Zach Bryan	Zach Bryan	
2024	Unheard	Hozier	
2024	Rockstar	Dolly Parton	

== Multiple wins and nominations ==
=== Wins ===
- 2 (Coldplay, Imagine Dragons, Mumford & Sons, Twenty One Pilots)

=== Nominations ===
- 6 (Mumford & Sons); 4 (Coldplay, Imagine Dragons, Twenty One Pilots); 3 (Zach Bryan, The Lumineers); 2 (Linkin Park, The Black Keys, Hozier, Noah Kahan, Lorde, Nickelback, Panic! at the Disco)
