= 2021 iHeartRadio Music Awards =

2021 edition of the iHeartRadio Music Awards

- Date: May 27, 2021
- Location: Dolby Theatre, Los Angeles
- Country: United States
- Hosted by: Usher
- Most awards: The Weeknd (5)
- Most nominations: The Weeknd (8)
- Website: news.iheart.com/awards

Television/radio coverage
- Network: Fox

The 2021 iHeartRadio Music Awards were held at the Dolby Theatre in Los Angeles on May 27, 2021, and was broadcast live on Fox. Usher hosted the ceremony.

== Performances ==
Performers were announced on May 11, 2021, through the iHeartRadio website.

Performers at the 2021 iHeartRadio Music Awards
Performer(s)	Song(s)
The Weeknd Ariana Grande	"Save Your Tears" (Ariana Grande remix)
Dan + Shay	"Glad You Exist"
Silk Sonic	"Leave the Door Open"
Brandi Carlile Demi Lovato H.E.R.	Tribute to Elton John "Bennie and the Jets" "Don't Let the Sun Go Down on Me" "I'm Still Standing"
Doja Cat	Medley: "Say So" "Streets" "Kiss Me More"
Usher	Medley: "Confessions Part I" "Love in This Club" "U Don't Have To Call" "DJ Got Us Falling In Love" "Scream" "OMG" "Freek-a-Leek" "Yeah!" "Get Low" (with Lil Jon)

== Winners and nominees ==
iHeartRadio announced the nominees on April 7, 2021.

Winners are listed first and in bold

Song of the Year	Female Artist of the Year
**"Blinding Lights" – The Weeknd**; "Circles" – Post Malone; "Don't Start Now" – Dua Lipa; "Rockstar" – DaBaby featuring Roddy Ricch; "Watermelon Sugar" – Harry Styles	**Dua Lipa**; Ariana Grande; Billie Eilish; Megan Thee Stallion; Taylor Swift
Male Artist of the Year	Best Duo/Group of the Year
**The Weeknd**; Harry Styles; Justin Bieber; Post Malone; Roddy Ricch	**Dan + Shay**; BTS; Jonas Brothers; Maroon 5; Twenty One Pilots
Album of the Year (per genre)	Best Collaboration
Alternative rock: **Machine Gun Kelly – Tickets to My Downfall**; Country: **Luke Combs – What You See Ain't Always What You Get**; Dance: **Diplo – Diplo Presents Thomas Wesley, Chapter 1: Snake Oil**; Latin pop/Reggaeton: **Bad Bunny – YHLQMDLG**; Pop: **Taylor Swift – Folklore**; R&B: **Jhené Aiko – Chilombo**; Rap: **Lil Baby – My Turn**; Regional Mexican: **Christian Nodal – Ayayay!**; Rock: **AC/DC – Power Up**	**"Savage" (Remix) – Megan Thee Stallion featuring Beyoncé**; "Go Crazy" - Chris Brown & Young Thug; "Holy" - Justin Bieber featuring Chance the Rapper; "I Hope" - Gabby Barrett featuring Charlie Puth; "Mood" - 24kGoldn featuring iann dior
Best New Pop Artist	Alternative Rock Song of the Year
**Doja Cat**; 24kGoldn; Blackbear; JP Saxe; Pop Smoke	**"Level of Concern" – Twenty One Pilots**; "Bang!" – AJR; "Bloody Valentine" – Machine Gun Kelly; "Everything I Wanted" – Billie Eilish; "Monsters" – All Time Low featuring Blackbear
Alternative Rock Artist of the Year	Best New Rock/Alternative Artist
**Twenty One Pilots**; AJR; All Time Low; Billie Eilish; Cage the Elephant	**Powfu**; Ashe; Dayglow; Royal & the Serpent; Wallows
Rock Song of the Year	Rock Artist of the Year
**"Shame Shame" – Foo Fighters**; "Death by Rock and Roll" – The Pretty Reckless; "Patience" – Chris Cornell; "Shot in the Dark" – AC/DC; "Under the Graveyard" – Ozzy Osbourne	**The Pretty Reckless**; AC/DC; Five Finger Death Punch; Ozzy Osbourne; Shinedown
Country Song of the Year	Country Artist of the Year
**"The Bones" – Maren Morris**; "Even Though I'm Leaving" – Luke Combs; "I Hope" – Gabby Barrett; "One Margarita" – Luke Bryan; "Nobody but You" – Blake Shelton & Gwen Stefani	**Luke Combs**; Blake Shelton; Luke Bryan; Maren Morris; Thomas Rhett
Best New Country Artist	Dance Song of the Year
**Gabby Barrett**; Ashley McBryde; Hardy; Ingrid Andress; Jameson Rodgers	**"Roses" (Imanbek Remix) – Saint Jhn**; "Head & Heart" – Joel Corry featuring MNEK; "ILY (I Love You Baby)" – Surf Mesa featuring Emilee; "Lasting Lover" – Sigala & James Arthur; "Rain on Me" – Lady Gaga & Ariana Grande
Dance Artist of the Year	Hip-Hop Song of the Year
**Marshmello**; Anabel Englund; Diplo; Surf Mesa; Tiësto	**"The Box" – Roddy Ricch**; "High Fashion" – Roddy Ricch featuring Mustard; "Life Is Good" – Future featuring Drake; "Rockstar" – DaBaby featuring Roddy Ricch; "Savage (Remix)" – Megan Thee Stallion featuring Beyoncé
Hip-Hop Artist of the Year	Best New Hip-Hop Artist
**Roddy Ricch**; DaBaby; Lil Baby; Megan Thee Stallion; Pop Smoke	**Roddy Ricch**; Jack Harlow; Moneybagg Yo; Pop Smoke; Rod Wave
R&B Song of the Year	R&B Artist of the Year
**"Go Crazy" – Chris Brown & Young Thug**; "B.S." – Jhené Aiko featuring H.E.R.; "Heat" – Chris Brown featuring Gunna; "Playing Games" – Summer Walker; "Slide" – H.E.R. featuring YG	**H.E.R.**; Chris Brown; Jhené Aiko; Snoh Aalegra; Summer Walker
Best New R&B Artist	Latin Pop/Reggaeton Song of the Year
**Snoh Aalegra**; Chloe x Halle; Lonr.; Mahalla; Skip Marley	**"Tusa" – Karol G & Nicki Minaj**; "Caramelo" – Ozuna; "Dákiti" – Bad Bunny & Jhay Cortez; "Hawái (Remix)" – Maluma & The Weeknd; "Ritmo (Bad Boys for Life)" – Black Eyed Peas & J Balvin
Latin Pop/Reggaeton Artist of the Year	Best New Latin Artist
**J Balvin**; Bad Bunny; Karol G; Maluma; Ozuna	**Rauw Alejandro**; Chesca; Jay Wheeler; Natanael Cano; Nato Bernal
Regional Mexican Song of the Year	Regional Mexican Artist of the Year
**"Se Me Olvidó" – Christian Nodal**; "Palabra De Hombre" – El Fantasma; "Solo Tú" – Calibre 50; "Te Volvería A Elegir" – Calibre 50; "Yo Ya No Vuelvo Contigo" – Lenin Ramírez featuring Grupo Firme	**Christian Nodal**; Banda Los Sebastianes; Calibre 50; Edwin Luna y La Tracalosa de Monterrey; Gerardo Ortíz
Producer of the Year	Songwriter of the Year
**Max Martin**; Andrew Watt; Dr. Luke; Frank Dukes; Louis Bell	**Ashley Gorley**; Ali Tamposi; Amy Allen; Dan Nigro; Finneas
Best Lyrics (socially voted)	Best Cover Song (socially voted)
**"Adore You" – Harry Styles**; "Before You Go" – Lewis Capaldi; "Blinding Lights" – The Weeknd; "Cardigan" – Taylor Swift; "Don't Start Now" – Dua Lipa; "Everything I Wanted" – Billie Eilish; "I Hope" – Gabby Barrett featuring Charlie Puth; "If the World Was Ending" – JP Saxe featuring Julia Michaels; "Intentions" – Justin Bieber featuring Quavo; "Life Is Good" – Future featuring Drake	**"Juice" (Lizzo) – Harry Styles**; "Adore You" (Harry Styles) – Lizzo; "Can't Take My Eyes Off You" (Frankie Valli) – Shawn Mendes; "Fix You" (Coldplay) – Sam Smith; "Heart of Glass" (Blondie) – Miley Cyrus
Best Fan Army (socially voted)	Best Music Video (socially voted)
**BTS – BTS Army**; Agnez Mo – Agnation; Ariana Grande – Arianators; Justin Bieber – Beliebers; Blackpink – Blink; Harry Styles – Harries; Why Don't We – Limelights; Louis Tomlinson – Louies; Shawn Mendes – MendesArmy; NCT 127 – NCTzens; Selena Gomez – Selenators; Taylor Swift – Swifties	**"Dynamite" – BTS**; "Blinding Lights" – The Weeknd; "Don't Start Now" – Dua Lipa; "Hawái" – Maluma; "How You Like That" – Blackpink; "Life Is Good" – Future featuring Drake; "Rain on Me" – Lady Gaga & Ariana Grande; "WAP" – Cardi B featuring Megan Thee Stallion; "Watermelon Sugar" – Harry Styles; "Yummy" – Justin Bieber
Social Star Award (socially voted)	Favorite Music Video Choreography (socially voted)
**Olivia Rodrigo**; Dixie D'Amelio; Jxdn; Lil Huddy; Nessa Barrett; Tate McRae	**"Dynamite" (BTS) – Son Sung Deuk**; "34+35" (Ariana Grande) – Scott & Brian Nicholson; "Bop" (DaBaby) – Coach Cherry & DaniLeigh; "Do It" (Chloe x Halle) – Kendra Bracy & Ashanti Ledon; "Honey Boo" (CNCO & Natti Natasha) – Kyle Hanagamy; "Physical" (Dua Lipa) – Charm La'Donna; "Rain on Me" (Lady Gaga & Ariana Grande) – Richy Jackson
TikTok Bop of the Year (socially voted)	Label of the Year
**"Blinding Lights" – The Weeknd**; "Lottery (Renegade)" – K Camp; "Savage" – Megan Thee Stallion; "Savage Love (Laxed – Siren Beat)" – Jawsh 685 & Jason Derulo; "Say So" – Doja Cat; "WAP" – Cardi B featuring Megan Thee Stallion	**Republic Records**
Titanium Artist of the Year	Titanium Song of the Year
**The Weeknd**	**"Blinding Lights" – The Weeknd**
Icon Award
**Elton John**
