= MGK =

American musician (born 1990)

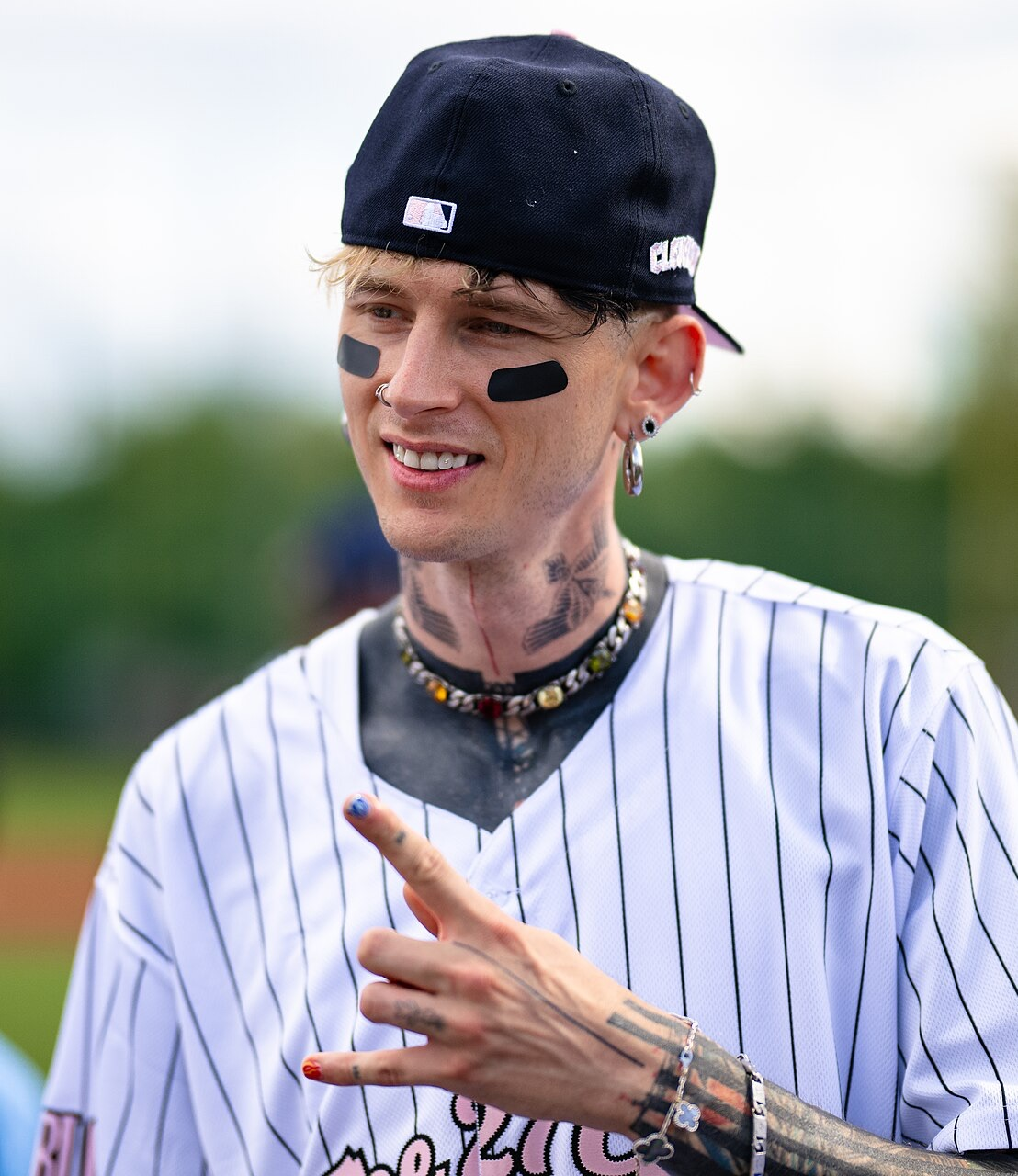
- MGK in 2024
- Born: Colson Baker (Note: MGK's birth name has sometimes been erroneously reported as Richard Colson Baker. He has clarified that his full birth name is Colson Baker with no middle name, and has blamed Wikipedia for the source of the error.); April 22, 1990 (age 36); Houston, Texas, U.S.
- Other name: Machine Gun Kelly
- Occupations: Rapper; singer; songwriter; record producer; actor
- Years active: 2006–present
- Works: Discography; filmography
- Partner: Megan Fox (2020–2024)
- Children: 2
- Awards: Full list
- Musical career
- Origin: Cleveland, Ohio, U.S.
- Genres: Hip-hop; pop rap; rap rock; pop-punk; alternative rock
- Instruments: Vocals; guitar
- Labels: EST 19XX; Bad Boy; Interscope
- Website: machinegunkelly.com

Colson Baker (born April 22, 1990), known professionally as MGK (stylized as mgk) and formerly Machine Gun Kelly, is an American rapper, singer, songwriter, producer, and actor. His original stage name "Machine Gun Kelly" was derived from the nickname of Prohibition-era gangster George Kelly Barnes.

MGK self-released four mixtapes from 2007 to 2010 before he signed with Sean Combs' Bad Boy Records, an imprint of Interscope Records, in 2011. His debut studio album, Lace Up (2012), peaked at number four on the US Billboard 200 and was led by the single "Wild Boy" (featuring Waka Flocka Flame), which marked his first entry on the Billboard Hot 100 and received triple platinum certification by the Recording Industry Association of America (RIAA). His second and third albums, General Admission (2015) and Bloom (2017), were both met with critical praise and similar commercial success; the latter was supported by the single "Bad Things" (with Camila Cabello), which peaked at number four on the Billboard Hot 100. His 2018 single, "Rap Devil", was a diss track aimed at fellow rapper Eminem, and peaked at number 13 on the chart despite mixed critical response. His fourth album, Hotel Diablo (2019), experimented with rap rock and saw a critical incline.

MGK's fifth album, Tickets to My Downfall (2020), waived any semblance of hip-hop in favor of a pop-punk sound and aesthetic, with its production entirely helmed by Blink-182 drummer Travis Barker. It debuted atop the Billboard 200—becoming the only rock album to do so that year—and was supported by the single "My Ex's Best Friend" (featuring blackbear), which peaked within the top 20 of the Billboard Hot 100. Its sequel, Mainstream Sellout (2022), served as his sixth album and matched its commercial success, although critical reception was mixed. In 2024, he released the collaborative extended play, (EP) Genre: Sadboy, with fellow Ohio-based rapper Trippie Redd, and delved into pop-rock with his seventh album, Lost Americana (2025).

MGK had his first starring role in the romantic drama Beyond the Lights (2014), and since appeared in the techno-thriller Nerve (2016), the horror Bird Box (2018), the comedy Big Time Adolescence and portrayed Tommy Lee in the Mötley Crüe biopic The Dirt (both 2019). In 2022, he and Mod Sun made their directorial debuts with the stoner comedy film Good Mourning, which they also wrote, produced, and starred in.

== Early life ==
Colson Baker was born on April 22, 1990, in Houston, Texas. Baker's parents were both Christian missionaries and moved all around the world during his childhood. He lived in Egypt for the first four years of his life and learned to speak Arabic before he learned English. He later lived in Kenya and Germany, as well as throughout the United States in Texas, Los Angeles, and Chicago. Baker's mother left home when he was nine years old and he and his father moved to Denver to live with his aunt. His father fought depression and unemployment. Baker says he had just two school outfits and that he endured bullying from children in his neighborhood.

He began listening to rap in the sixth grade, when he attended Hamilton Middle School, a school with an ethnically diverse student body in Denver. He attended Thomas Jefferson High School (Denver) his freshman year. When he lived in Cleveland, Baker attended Shaker Heights High School.

The first three rappers that got him into the genre of hip hop as a child were Ludacris, Eminem and DMX, with Baker gaining interest in the genre after listening to DMX's "We Right Here" from the album The Great Depression (2001).

== Career ==
=== Early career ===
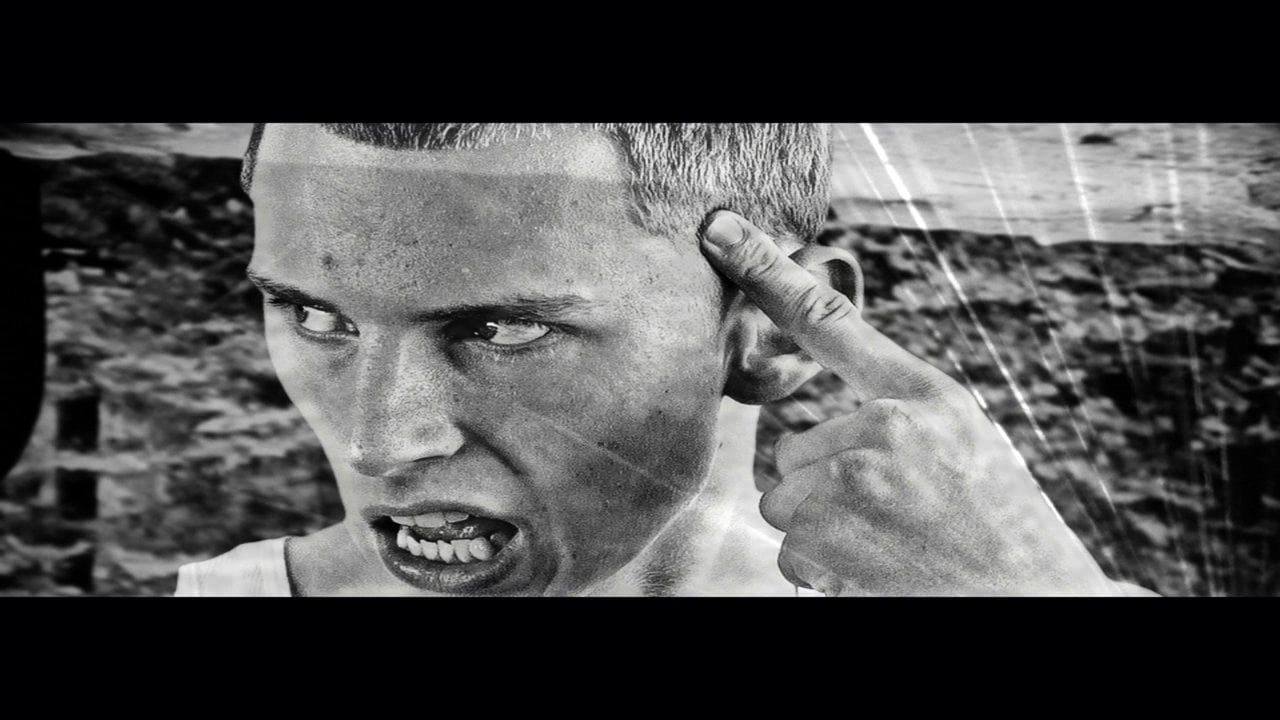
MGK's music video "Alice in Wonderland", 2010

After high school, Baker was kicked out by his father. In March 2009, while he was on the verge of getting evicted, Baker traveled to Harlem's Apollo Theater, where he had consecutive victories, making him the first-ever rapper to win at the Apollo Theater. He recorded music in his home studio, which he refers to as the "Rage Cage", and started to gain exposure when he was featured on MTV2's Sucker Free Freestyle, where he freestyled numerous verses from his "Chip off the Block" single. In February 2010, he released his mixtape 100 Words and Running, where his catchphrase, "Lace Up", started as a mixtape interlude before becoming a prominent reference in his music. Despite his rising popularity, Baker still worked at Chipotle to afford rent. He soon also became a father.

In May 2010, Baker made his national debut with the single "Alice in Wonderland", which was released on iTunes and accompanied by a music video. It was released via Block Starz Music. The single earned Baker the "Best Midwest Artist" at the 2010 Underground Music Awards, and his "Alice in Wonderland" clip won Best Music Video at the 2010 Ohio Hip-Hop Awards. He released his second mixtape in November 2010 titled Lace Up, which featured the hometown anthem "Cleveland", which was then played at Cleveland Cavaliers home games and went on rotation on Z107.9 in Cleveland. The mixtape was recorded in three months in 2010 during a creative burst. Following the release of the mixtape, he was featured in the magazine XXL in 2011. He then appeared on the Juicy J track "Inhale", which also featured Steve-O from the television series Jackass in the music video.

In March 2011, Baker participated in his first SXSW show in Austin, Texas, where Sean Combs offered Baker a recording contract with Bad Boy Records, an imprint of Interscope Records. After Bad Boy parted ways with the label in favor of Epic Records as its distributor in 2015, Baker remained signed with Interscope in a joint venture with Bad Boy. Prior to the contract, he was featured on the XV song "Finally Home".

=== 2012–2015: Lace Up and General Admission ===
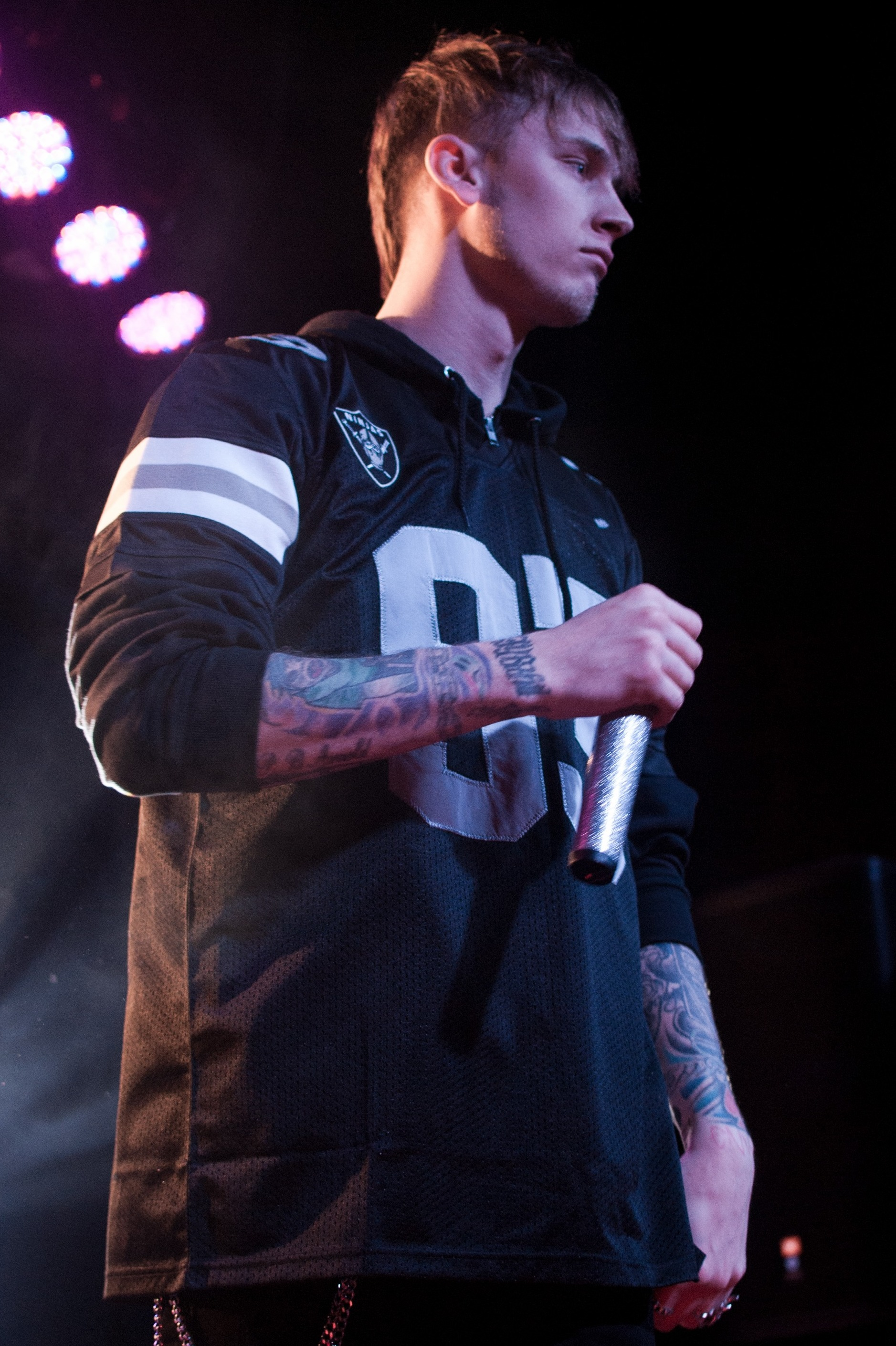
Performing in Pittsburgh in March 2013

Baker announced that his debut album would be titled Lace Up and would have an intended release on October 9, 2012. "Wild Boy" served as the lead single for the album and the song peaked on the US Billboard Hot 100 at number 98. It was soon certified gold by the RIAA. The song "Invincible" was released on iTunes on December 16, 2011, featuring co-writer and singer Ester Dean as the second single of the album. The song is featured in a commercial for the HTC ReZound as well as the official theme song of WrestleMania XXVIII. WWE also used the song to highlight John Cena in his match at the event, with Baker also performing at WrestleMania prior to the main event between Cena and The Rock. "Invincible" was also used as the theme for Thursday Night Football when it was on the NFL Network. WWE also used the song "All We Have" to again highlight Cena on his rematch with The Rock at next year's event. On December 14, 2011, Baker was named the Hottest Breakthrough MC of 2011 by MTV. On March 18, 2012, Baker won the MTVu Breaking Woodie award before being featured on the cover of XXL as part of their annual "Top 10 Freshmen list" along with fellow rappers Macklemore, French Montana, Hopsin, Danny Brown, Iggy Azalea, Roscoe Dash, Future, Don Trip and Kid Ink. On August 13, 2012, Baker self-released a mixtape titled EST 4 Life, which contained both old and recently recorded material.

Lace Up was released on October 9, 2012. The album featured guest appearances from Bun B, Cassie, DMX, Ester Dean, Lil Jon, Tech N9ne, Twista, Waka Flocka Flame, Young Jeezy and Dub-O. The album debuted at number 4 on the US Billboard 200, with first-week sales of 57,000 copies. It slid down to No. 22 in its second week, giving it a total of 65,000 copies sold. As of September 2015, the album has sold 263,000 copies.

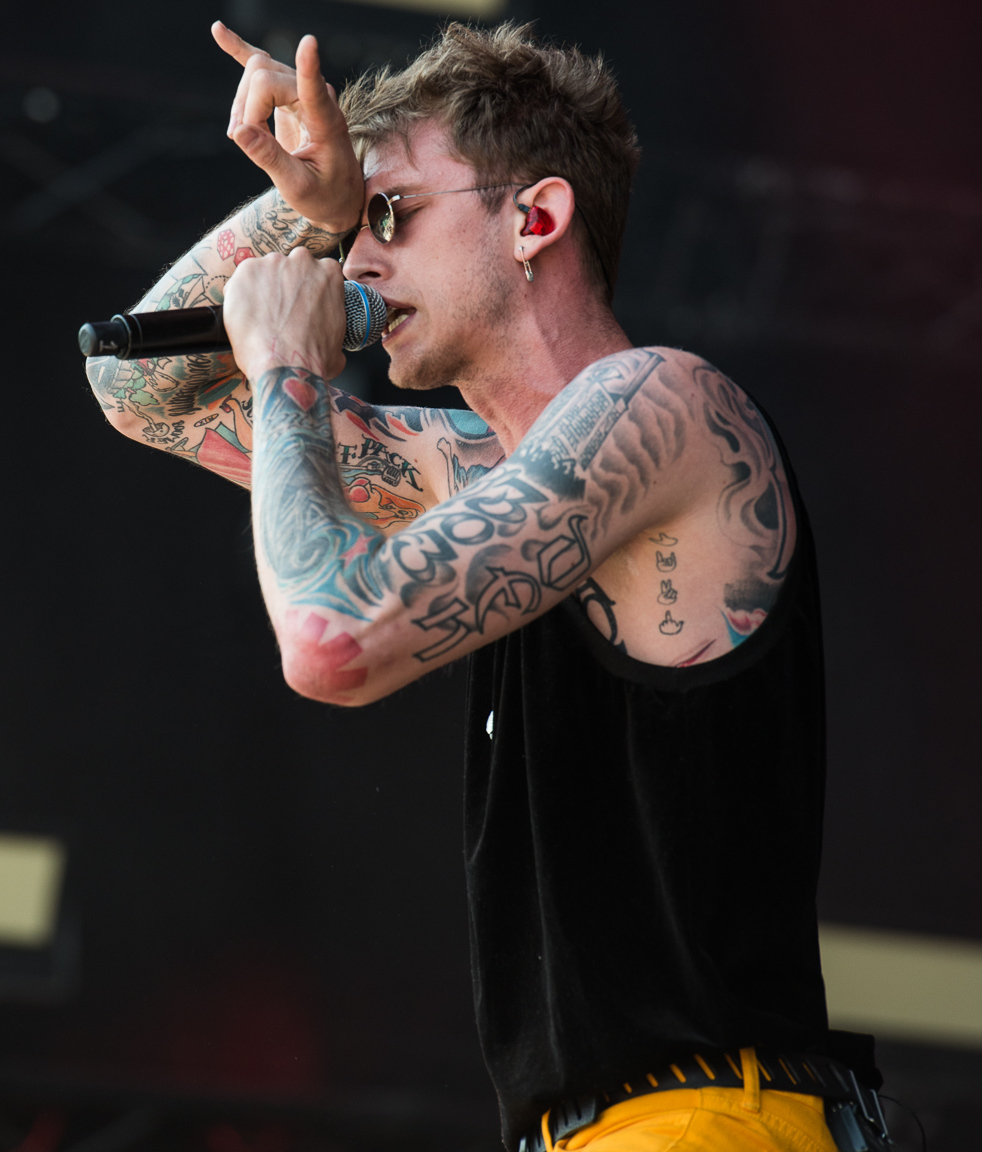
Performing at RiP in 2017

In early 2012, Baker announced that he would be releasing a new mixtape. Pusha T and Meek Mill were the first artists to be featured on the mixtape, both appearing on the track "Pe$o". Baker also announced that Wiz Khalifa will be featured on the mixtape. On February 18, 2013, Baker announced the name of the mixtape as Black Flag and revealed the cover. He also released a music video for "Champions" which features Diddy and samples The Diplomats song "We Are the Champions", as the music video release served as a promotional video for Black Flag. On June 26, Baker released Black Flag without prior announcement. The mixtape also featured guest appearances from French Montana, Kellin Quinn, Dub-O, Sean McGee and Tezo. On June 4, 2013, Baker posted a picture of a letter on his social media accounts which read:

This project is dedicated to love, because for my entire life it has been taken from me. Granted, when it was given, I pushed it right back. I couldn't handle it. This was until I experienced the loss of love for what I love doing most: music. That was the one thing worth fighting for, even more-so then[sic] the love of my father. I've found that love again. And I plan on never surrendering it. Find what you love and fight!! Black Flag.

Following the release of Black Flag, rumors surfaced that Baker had begun working on his second studio album. In January 2014, he confirmed that he was in the early stages of working on the album, with 2015 being the scheduled year of release. On January 5, 2015, Baker released the song "Till I Die", which was accompanied with a music video on his VEVO account. Months later, a remix of "Till I Die" with hometown fellow hip-hop group Bone Thugs-n-Harmony was confirmed and released on June 5, 2015. The song aired via WorldStarHipHop and featured French Montana, Yo Gotti and Ray Cash. On May 18, 2015, the music video for another song titled "A Little More" was released, with the single featuring vocals from Victoria Monet. Baker soon had an interview with MTV, describing the reason as to why he wrote "A Little More". Stating in the interview: "People always came up to me after the first album and a lot of my friends back home said 'we need something for the streets' and then I did 'Till I Die'. Months later, when I look back at the video [for Till I Die] I [was] like 'Okay, he's in jail, he's shot, he's dead, he snitched' and just to the point where it's sad and I wrote the song to describe how I see the world as a much mature person." He also updated the status on his second studio album, noting that the album is finished, and stating that the album would contain "more lyricism and [would be more] stylistically [influenced by] hip-hop but musically, sonically [would contain] more live instrumentation."

On June 25, Baker released the title of his second album as General Admission, due to be released in late September 2015.

=== 2016–2019: Bloom, feud with Eminem and Hotel Diablo ===
In February, Baker appeared at Fastlane, which was hosted at the Quicken Loans Arena in downtown Cleveland. Baker released "Bad Things" in late 2016, a joint single with Camila Cabello, which has reached a peak of number four on the US Billboard Hot 100.

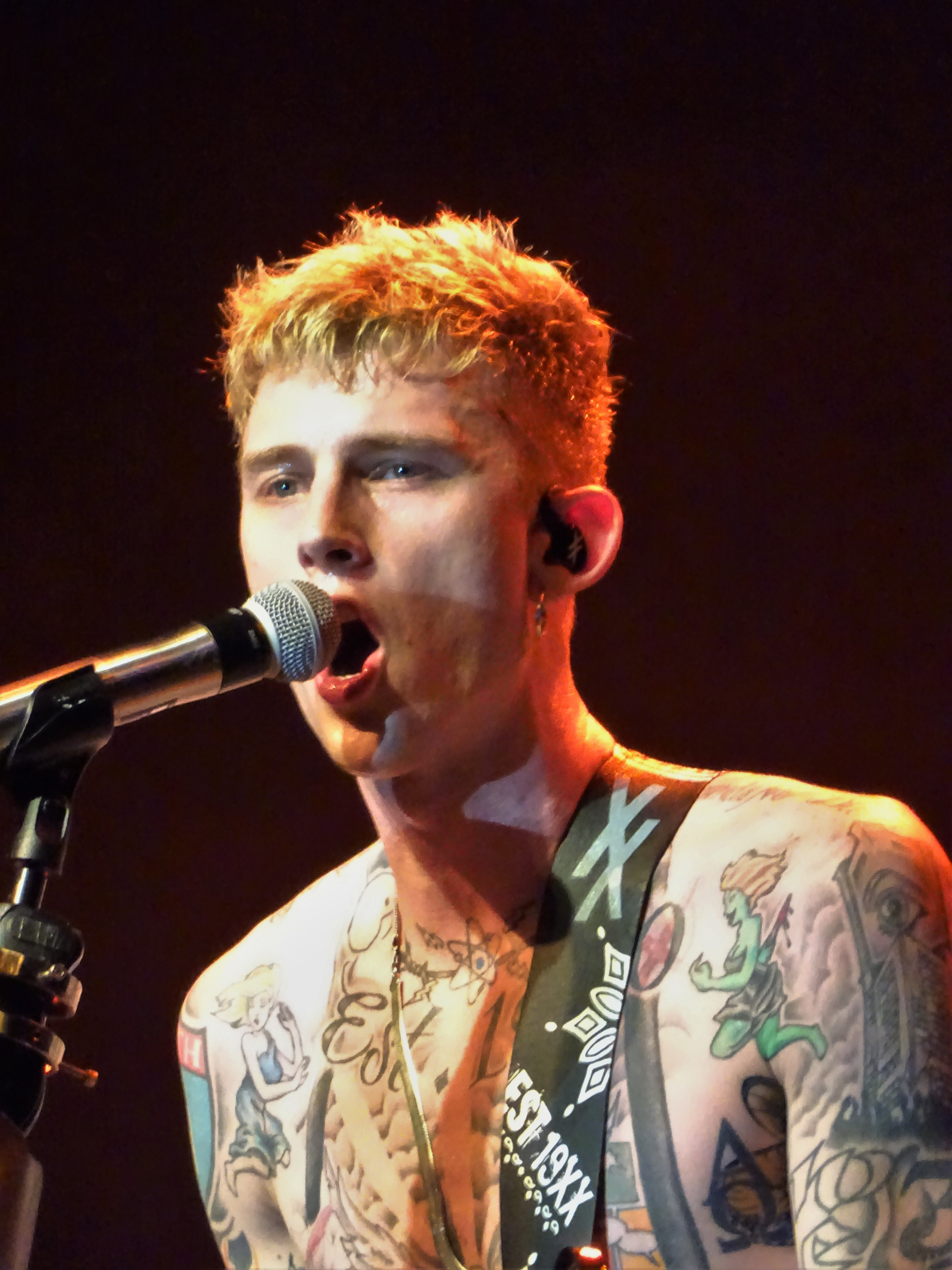
Performing at the 2018 Summerfest in Milwaukee

Baker was going to be the opening act on the North American leg of Linkin Park's One More Light Tour before the tour was cancelled due to Linkin Park frontman Chester Bennington's suicide. Baker would subsequently pay tribute to Bennington by releasing an acoustic cover of the Linkin Park song "Numb".

On September 3, 2018, Baker released the song "Rap Devil". The track was a response to Eminem's diss track "Not Alike" off of his album Kamikaze. Playing on Eminem's own "Rap God" single, the track accuses Eminem of trying to sideline Baker's career after a comment Baker made in 2012 about Eminem's teenage daughter, Hailie. Baker publicly stated on his Twitter account that on the response track he was "standing up for not just myself, but my generation. [I'm] doing the same shit you did back in your day." "Rap Devil" topped the iTunes Chart on September 10, 2018. On September 14, Eminem responded to "Rap Devil" with his diss track "Killshot".

On September 21, 2018, Baker released his second extended play (EP), Binge, which had first week sales of 21,519 units and debuted at number 24 on the Billboard 200. It was preceded by the singles "Loco" and "Rap Devil", and coincided with the release of his Ronny J-produced single "Lately" that same day. The EP saw a largely unfavorable critical response.

In April 2019, Billboard reported that Baker's upcoming album would be titled Hotel Diablo. The first single, "Hollywood Whore", was released on May 17, 2019. The second single, "El Diablo", was released on May 31, 2019. On June 7, 2019, Baker released the third single, "I Think I'm Okay", with Yungblud and Travis Barker, a pop punk song. Hotel Diablo was released on July 5, 2019. On July 9, 2019, he released the official music video for "Candy" featuring Trippie Redd. He released the final single, "Glass House" featuring Naomi Wild on the same day. The album debuted at number 5 on the Billboard 200 chart, becoming his fourth top ten album.

On December 18, 2019, Baker released the single "Why Are You Here", another pop punk song. Later in the same month, he began teasing an upcoming project with Travis Barker as producer. He later revealed that the album would be entirely pop punk, stating that he was inspired to pursue a whole release in the style because of his two previously released in the genre.

=== 2020–2023: Tickets to My Downfall and Mainstream Sellout ===
On January 14, 2020, Baker announced the title of his project Tickets to My Downfall, which would be released on September 25, 2020. On March 17, 2020, he released the song "Bullets with Names", featuring Young Thug, RJMrLA and Lil Duke, a rap track not associated with the album. During the COVID-19 lockdowns, Baker began to release daily recordings, covers, and collaborations as part of his #LockdownSessions series. Releases included covers of "Misery Business" by Paramore (with Travis Barker), "Champagne Supernova" by Oasis (with Yungblud), and a remix of "My House" by PVRIS. Some tracks were later re-released on special editions of Tickets to My Downfall. Tickets to My Downfall's first single "Bloody Valentine" was released on May 1, 2020, followed by "Concert for Aliens" on August 5 and "My Ex's Best Friend" featuring Blackbear on August 7.

In August 2020, Baker opened his own coffee house called 27 Club Coffee in his hometown of Cleveland, Ohio. On September 29, 2020, a music video was released for the Tickets to My Downfall song "Drunk Face", directed by Mod Sun, which was followed on October 22, 2020, by a music video for "Forget Me Too". Throughout October 2020, the four episodes of Halloween in Hell, a fictionalised musical horror podcast that Baker created and starred in, were released. The series also starred Iann Dior, 24kGoldn, Dana Dentata, Phem and Tommy Lee. The podcast was accompanied by the album Audio Up presents: Original Music from Halloween In Hell, a soundtrack performed collaboratively by all the actors involved, and written and composed by Jared Gutstadt. Baker directed the music video for Mod Sun's song "Karma", which was released on November 12, 2020.

On November 22, 2020, after his performance at the AMAs, Baker announced his album Tickets to My Downfall was going to be turned into a "first of its kind musical film experience" titled Downfalls High which aired in January 2021. On November 30, 2020, Yungblud announced on Twitter he'll be releasing a new collaboration featuring Baker and Travis Barker titled "Acting Like That". On January 15, 2021, Baker released Downfalls High on his Facebook page followed by a release to YouTube on January 18. Directed by Baker and Mod Sun and narrated by Baker and Barker, the film stars Chase Hudson and Sydney Sweeney as teenage lovers in what Baker described as a "pop-punk [version of] Grease". Iann Dior, Phem, Jxdn, and Trippie Redd, also make appearances.

On March 12, 2021, he released the single "DayWalker" featuring Corpse Husband. On April 29, he released the single "Love Race" featuring Kellin Quinn, the pair's third collaboration.

On August 9, 2021, he announced that his next album would be titled Born with Horns and would be another collaborative project with Barker. The first single, "Papercuts", was released on August 11. On January 30, 2022, he posted a preview of a collaboration with singer Willow titled "Emo Girl".

On August 26, 2021, it was announced that he would star in and co-direct the film Good Mourning, alongside Mod Sun, Dove Cameron, Megan Fox and Becky G. On February 5, 2022, MGK performed during the 2022 NHL All-Star Game halftime show in Las Vegas.

On January 31, 2022, he announced that the album had been retitled to Mainstream Sellout. Critical reception was mixed.

=== 2024–present: Name change, Genre: Sadboy and Lost Americana ===
On February 29, 2024, Baker changed his professional moniker from Machine Gun Kelly to simply the initials MGK (stylized in all lowercase).

On March 23, 2024, Baker, alongside rapper Trippie Redd, announced a collaborative extended play titled Genre: Sadboy, which would release on March 29. Two singles were released for the EP: "Lost Boys" and "Beauty". The duo performed two free concerts to promote the release, which took place April 2 at Irving Plaza in New York City, and April 4 at the Bluestone in Columbus, Ohio.

On May 6, 2025, Baker released a freestyle rap cover over NSYNC's song "Bye Bye Bye", where he teased that his next single would be a pop song. A few weeks later, on May 23, he released the single "Cliché". On June 10, he announced that the album was named Lost Americana and would be released on August 8, with one of his idols, Bob Dylan, narrating over the album trailer.

On October 16, 2025, it was announced MGK would be performing at halftime at the Canadian Football League's 112th Grey Cup in Winnipeg, Manitoba.

On May 22, 2026, MGK released Blog Era Boyz, a collaborative mixtape with rapper Wiz Khalifa.

== Musical style and influences ==
Baker's musical style has been mainly described as hip-hop, pop rap, and rap rock. His fifth album, Tickets to My Downfall, marked a change in sound and has been described as pop-punk and alternative rock.

Baker cites DMX and Eminem as music influences, as well as listening to rock bands Guns N' Roses and Blink-182 during his youth. Baker cites these rap and rock artists as major musical influences. In an interview discussing his collaboration with DMX, Baker called the rapper his idol. He also stated that DMX's music helped him through his troubles while growing up, especially bullying.

== Acting career ==
Baker made his film debut in the 2014 romantic drama Beyond the Lights, where he played a "shallow, self-important" rapper named Kid Culprit. In 2016, he co-starred and co-executive produced the drama film The Land, a Cleveland-set drama produced by fellow rapper Nas. The same year, he had a minor role in the techno-thriller adventure film Nerve with Emma Roberts and Dave Franco; and had a recurring role on the Showtime comedy-drama series Roadies as Wes, a former Pearl Jam roadie.

He played Felix in the 2018 Netflix post-apocalyptic horror thriller film Bird Box with Sandra Bullock, and portrayed drummer Tommy Lee in The Dirt, a 2019 Netflix biographical comedy-drama about Mötley Crüe. He played the role of Newt in the 2020 superhero film Project Power opposite Jamie Foxx, and the following year, he co-starred with Bruce Willis and Megan Fox in the crime thriller film Midnight in the Switchgrass; and starred in the action western film The Last Son with Sam Worthington. Having previously been credited as Machine Gun Kelly for his acting performances, Baker began using his birth name for film credits in 2021. Baker played the role of London Clash in the self-directed film Good Mourning, released in 2022.

== Personal life ==
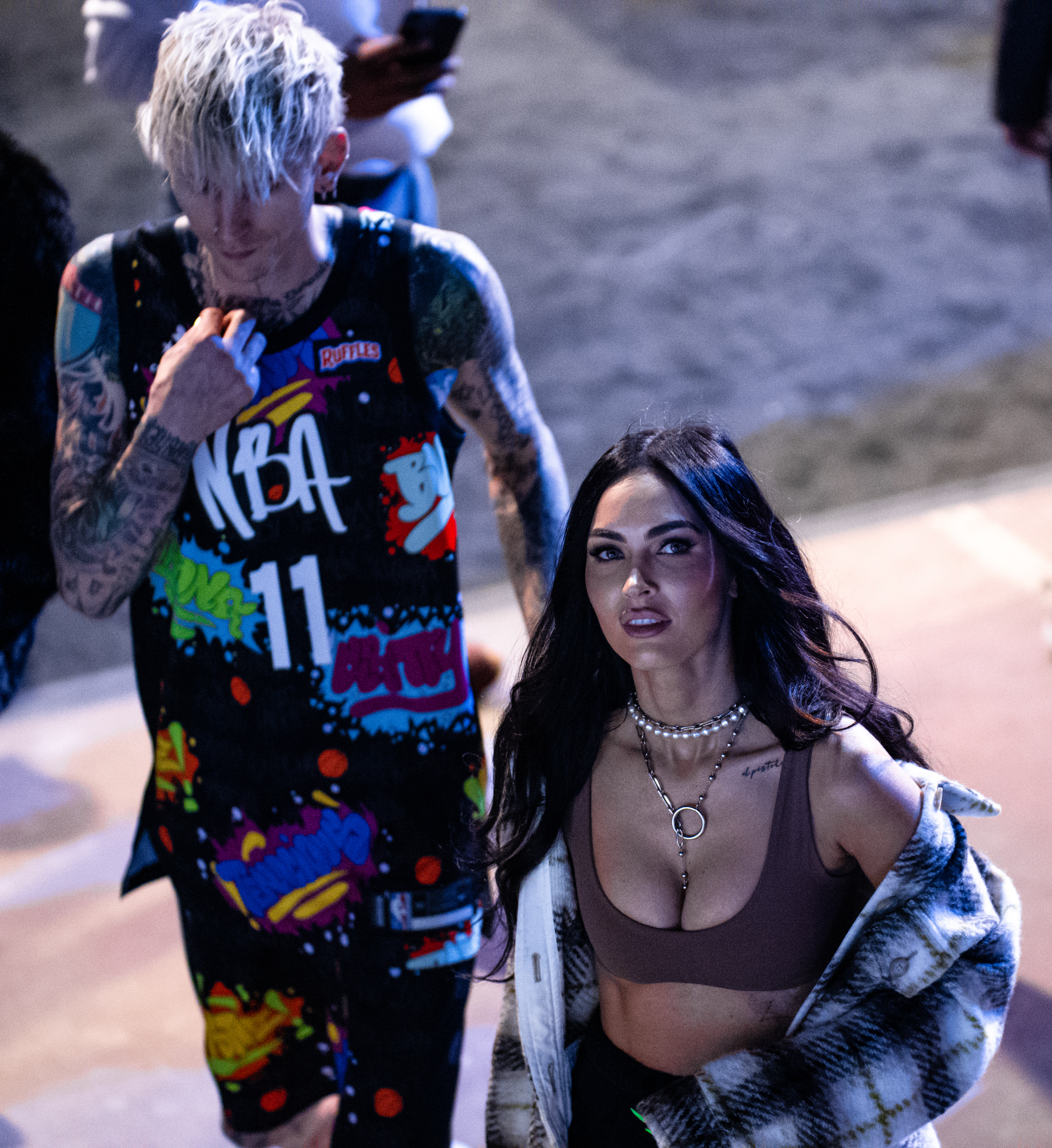
Baker and Megan Fox at the 2022 NBA Celebrity All-Star Game on February 18, 2022

In his teens, Baker was in a relationship with Emma Cannon, with whom he has a daughter named Casie, who was born in July 2009.

He is open about his use of cannabis and has claimed in interviews that he smokes daily, describing it as a "source of happiness and a way people can feel a little more love [in their own right]". He has frequently mentioned cannabis references within sources of his music and rap persona, making it a forefront of both his rap and personal character. Before the release of Lace Up, he had an addiction to heroin. He was also a heavy user of cocaine and alcohol before 2020, when he revealed that he had become addicted to Adderall and was seeking treatment.

In a 2012 interview, he stated that he identifies politically as an anarchist. In 2022, when he was asked on whether he plans to vote in the midterm elections, he replied: "I have anarchy tattooed on my stomach. I'm not a political person".

In May 2020, he began a relationship with actress Megan Fox after the two met while filming Midnight in the Switchgrass. On January 12, 2022, Fox announced that the two were engaged. In March 2024, Fox revealed that the couple had called their engagement off. In November 2024, Fox revealed on Instagram that she was pregnant with his child, following a miscarriage earlier in their relationship. Their daughter was born on March 27, 2025.

== Feuds ==
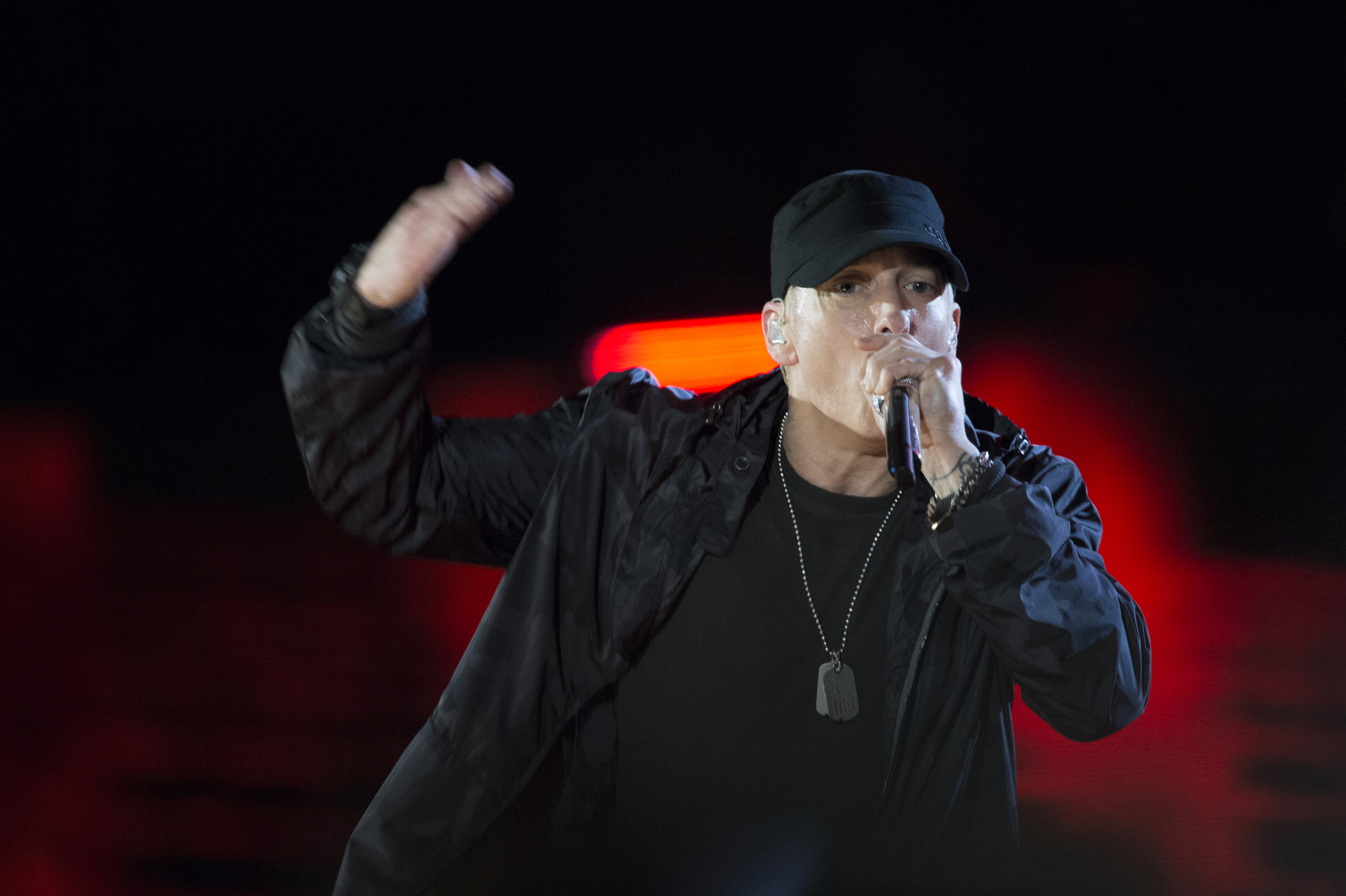
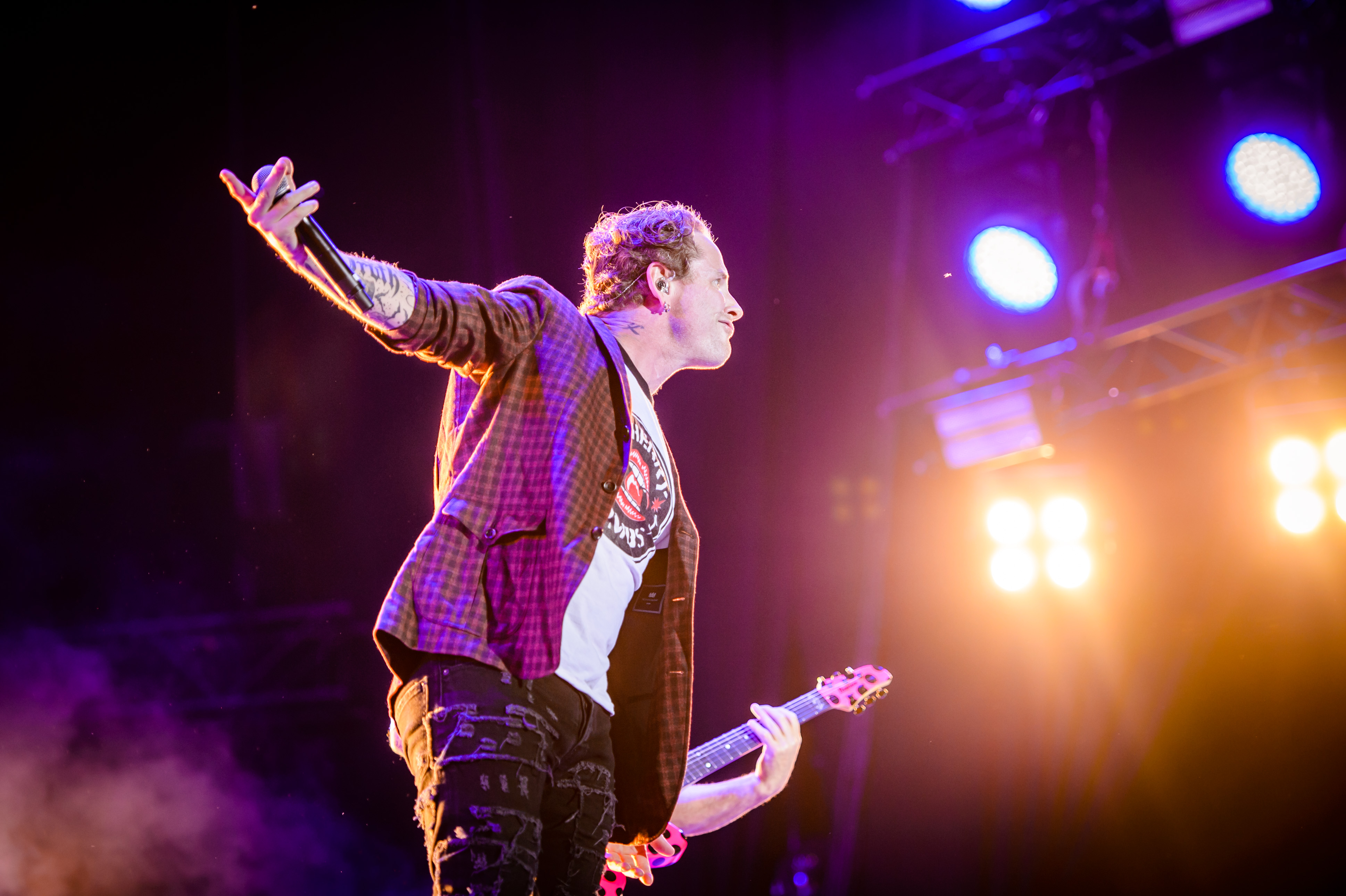
Two of Baker's highest profile feuds: Eminem (top), Slipknot frontman Corey Taylor (bottom).

=== Eminem ===
Baker's feud with Eminem began on May 7, 2012, when he wrote a tweet saying that Eminem's daughter Hailie was "hot as fuck"; he was 22 and she was 16 at the time. In an interview with WQHT on October 19, 2015, Baker alleged this led to Eminem blacklisting him from a number of radio stations. On May 16, 2017, Baker performed a freestyle for KPWR, which featured a line referencing Eminem's supposed banning of him from Shade 45. On March 1, 2018, Baker featured on a verse of Tech N9ne's song, "No Reason". Shortly after, on August 31, 2018, Eminem released his diss track "Not Alike," where he claimed that Baker's verse on the song was about him. On September 3, 2018, Baker responded to this with his own diss track "Rap Devil". On September 12, 2018, Eminem released an interview with Sway Calloway through his YouTube channel where he discussed his reason behind the feud. On September 14, 2018, Eminem released "Killshot," in response to "Rap Devil".

On January 17, 2020, Eminem released the song "Unaccommodating," which featured a verse directed at Baker. On March 17, 2020, Baker released the song "Bullets with Names," featuring Young Thug, RJMrLA and Lil Duke, in which the chorus was directed at Eminem. On December 18, 2020, Eminem released the song "Gnat" as the lead single for his album Music to Be Murdered By: Side B, where Eminem dissed Baker in the chorus. On December 15, 2021, Dr. Dre released a song titled "Gospel" off his new EP The Contract featuring Eminem which also contained shots at Baker.

In January 2022, fans speculated the feud would reignite after TikToker Hannah Neuman (@unluckyp1ckle) resurfaced a 2013 interview with Fuse.tv, wherein a then 23 year old Baker said he had a crush on an underage Kendall Jenner and wouldn't wait until she was 18 to pursue her. In response to the backlash, Baker tweeted a quote from Eminem's song, "The Way I Am," furthering the speculation about the controversy rekindling their feud.

=== G-Eazy ===
Baker's feud with G-Eazy began after the end of G-Eazy's relationship with Halsey, when photographs of Baker and Halsey together surfaced. On July 18, 2018, G-Eazy revealed that he had bleached his hair blond, which Baker alleged on Twitter was in an attempt to look like him. On August 30, 2018, G-Eazy released the diss track "Bad Boy" against Baker, who responded the next day in a freestyle performed for Hot 97. The same day, Baker tweeted side-by-side photos of the two, with the caption "I fucked his girl now he looks like me this shit overbearing". In the track "Killshot", Eminem defended G-Eazy and the two ended the feud in April 2019, through what NME described as an "intervention by Eminem". In October 2019, G-Eazy stated that Kid Cudi squashed the feud.

=== Corey Taylor ===
In 2021, Baker engaged in a feud with Slipknot frontman Corey Taylor after being alluded to in an interview where Taylor stated: "I hate all new rock for the most part – well, the artists who failed in one genre and decided to go rock. And I think he knows who he is, but that's another story." At Riot Fest in September 2021, Baker and Slipknot were scheduled to play on the same day and time, albeit on different stages. Baker took the opportunity to respond to Taylor's comments, beginning his set by asking the crew to light the crowd so he could "see who chose to be here instead of with all the old weird dudes with masks." He later insulted the band again by stating, "You wanna know what I'm really happy that I'm not doing? Being 50 years old, wearing a fuckin' weird mask on a fuckin' stage, talking shit."

Later on, Baker revealed on Twitter that Taylor was originally meant to feature on "Can't Look Back", a song for the deluxe edition of Tickets to My Downfall, but the collaboration did not come to fruition because Baker thought the verse was "fucking terrible" and accused Taylor of being bitter about not being featured on the album.

Taylor later addressed the feud during a fan Q&A in January 2022 where he claimed that Baker had started it. He went on to insult Baker's change in musical direction and told him to "suck every inch of my dick."

In July 2022, Baker admitted in his Life in Pink documentary that he regretted his feud with Taylor and wished that both of them handled the situation better instead of acting "ridiculous". In 2023, Taylor also expressed remorse regarding the feud they had, even clarifying that the two singers have a lot in common, saying: "He and I are very similar in certain ways. Which, shock and awe. Big-mouth singers. We are big-mouth singers".

== Backing band ==
=== Current members ===
- Steve "Baze" Basil – bass, keyboards (2017–present)
- Brandon "Slimxx" Allen – keyboards, backing vocals (2017–present)
- JP "Rook" Cappelletty – drums (2017–present)
- Travis Barker – drums (2019–present)
- Justin "Jus" Lyons – guitars (2021–present)
- Sophie Lloyd – guitars (2022–present)
- Andrew "No Love for the Middle Child" Migliore – guitars, backing vocals, cello (2025-present)

=== Former members ===
- AJ Tyus – guitars (2017–2021)

== Discography ==
Studio albums

- Lace Up (2012)
- General Admission (2015)
- Bloom (2017)
- Hotel Diablo (2019)
- Tickets to My Downfall (2020)
- Mainstream Sellout (2022)
- Lost Americana (2025)

== Tours ==
Headlining tours

- Hostile Takeover Tour (2012)
- No Class Tour (2014)
- Alpha Omega Tour (2016)
- 27 World Tour (2017)
- Hotel Diablo World Tour (2019)
- Tickets to My Downfall Tour (2021)
- Mainstream Sellout Tour (2022)
- Lost Americana Tour (2025–26)

Co-headlining tours

- The Justin Bieber Big Tour (with Young Thug) (2019)

== Filmography ==
=== Film ===
For film roles, he is credited as Colson Baker unless otherwise noted.

Year	Title	Role	Notes
2014	Beyond the Lights	Kid Culprit	Credited as Colson "MGK" Baker
2016	Punk's Dead	Crash	Credited as Colson "MGK" Baker
2016	Nerve	Ty	
2016	Viral	CJ	
2016	The Land	Slick	Also co-executive producer
2018	Bird Box	Felix	
2019	Big Time Adolescence	Nick	
2019	Captive State	Jurgis	
2019	The Dirt	Tommy Lee	
2020	Ray Jr's Rent Due	Himself	
2020	The King of Staten Island	Tattoo Shop Owner	
2020	Project Power	Newt	
2021	The Last Son	Cal / Lionel	
2021	Midnight in the Switchgrass	Calvin	
2022	Jackass Forever	Himself	Guest appearance
2022	Jackass 4.5	Himself	Cameo
2022	Taurus	Cole	
2022	Good Mourning	London	Also director, writer, and producer
2022	One Way	Freddy Sullivan / Alfredo	
2024	Jackpot!	Himself	Cameo

=== Television & video games ===
Year	Title	Role	Notes
2012, 2015, 2017	WWE Raw	Himself	3 episodes
2013	Guy Court	Himself	Episode: "Sweepstakes"
2014	Unsung	Himself	Episode: "Bone Thugs-n-Harmony"
2015	Catfish	Himself	Episode: "Hundra & Emily"
2015	Ridiculousness	Himself	Episode: "Machine Gun Kelly"
2016	Roadies	Wesley "Wes" Mason	10 episodes
2020	The Eric Andre Show	Himself	Episode: "You Got Served"
2023	Bupkis	Himself	Episode 8: "Show Me the Way"
2023	Dave	Himself	Episode 8: "Met Gala"
2024	SummerSlam	Himself	Accompanied Logan Paul and sat front row

Year	Title	Role	Notes
2022	WWE 2K22	Himself	DLC

=== Internet ===
Year	Title	Role	Notes
2015, 2018	Hot Ones	Himself	2 episodes
2021	Downfalls High	Himself	Also co-director and executive producer

=== Audio ===
Year	Title	Role	Notes
2020	Halloween in Hell	Himself	Scripted Podcast

== Awards and nominations ==
List of awards and nominations received by MGK
Award ceremony	Year	Category	Nominee(s) / Work(s)	Result	Ref.
ARIA Music Awards	2021	Best International Artist	"Tickets To My Downfall"	Nominated	
American Music Awards	2021	Favorite Rock Artist	Machine Gun Kelly	Won	
American Music Awards	2022	Favorite Rock Artist	Machine Gun Kelly	Won	
American Music Awards	2022	Favorite Rock Album	"Mainstream Sellout"	Nominated	
Billboard Music Awards	2017	Top Rap Collaboration	"Bad Things" (shared w/ Camila Cabello)	Nominated	
Billboard Music Awards	2020	Top Rock Song	"I Think I'm Okay" (with Yungblud & Travis Barker)	Nominated	
Billboard Music Awards	2021	Top Rock Song	"My Ex's Best Friend" (featuring Blackbear)	Nominated	
Billboard Music Awards	2021	Top Rock Album	"Tickets To My Downfall"	Won	
Billboard Music Awards	2021	Top Rock Artist	Machine Gun Kelly	Won	
Billboard Music Awards	2022	Top Rock Artist	Machine Gun Kelly	Nominated	
Grammy Awards	2023	Best Rock Album	"Mainstream Sellout"	Nominated	
iHeartRadio Music Awards	2018	Best Cover Song	"Say You Won't Let Go" (with Camila Cabello)	Nominated	
iHeartRadio Music Awards	2021	Alternative Rock Album of the Year	"Tickets to My Downfall"	Won	
iHeartRadio Music Awards	2021	Alternative Rock Song of the Year	"Bloody Valentine"	Nominated	
iHeartRadio Music Awards	2022	Alternative Rock Song of the Year	"My Ex's Best Friend" (featuring Blackbear)	Nominated	
iHeartRadio Music Awards	2022	Alternative Rock Artist of the Year	Machine Gun Kelly	Won	
MTV Europe Music Awards	2012	US Artist About To Go Global	Himself	Won	
MTV Europe Music Awards	2020	Best Alternative	Himself	Nominated	
MTV Europe Music Awards	2021	Best Alternative	Himself	Nominated	
MTV Video Music Awards	2020	Best Alternative	"Bloody Valentine"	Won	
MTV Video Music Awards	2021	Best Alternative	"My Ex's Best Friend" (featuring Blackbear)	Won	
MTV Video Music Awards	2022	Best Alternative	"Emo Girl" (featuring Willow)	Nominated	
MTVU Woodie Awards	2012	Breaking Woodie	Machine Gun Kelly	Won	
MTVU Woodie Awards	2013	Woodie of the Year	Machine Gun Kelly	Won	
Newport Beach Film Festival	2022	Spotlight Award	Machine Gun Kelly	Awarded	
San Diego International Film Festival	2022	Spotlight Award	Machine Gun Kelly	Awarded	
Ohio Hip Hop Awards	2009	Best Live Performer	Machine Gun Kelly	Won	
Ohio Hip Hop Awards	2010	Best Live Performer	Machine Gun Kelly	Won	
Ohio Hip Hop Awards	2010	Best Music Video	"Alice in Wonderland"	Won	
Ohio Hip Hop Awards	2011	Best Mixtape Artist	Machine Gun Kelly	Won	
Ohio Hip Hop Awards	2011	Best Mixtape	"Lace Up"	Won	
Ohio Hip Hop Awards	2011	Best Male Artist	Machine Gun Kelly	Won	
Ohio Hip Hop Awards	2011	Video of the Year	"Cleveland" (shared w/ Dubo)	Won	
Ohio Hip Hop Awards	2012	Best National Artist	Machine Gun Kelly	Won	
Ohio Hip Hop Awards	2012	Best National Mixtape/Album	"Rage Pack"	2nd Place	
Ohio Hip Hop Awards	2012	Best Collaboration	"Police" (shared w/ Pooh Gutta)	Won	
Ohio Hip Hop Awards	2014	National Noise Maker	Machine Gun Kelly	Won	
Ohio Hip Hop Awards	2014	Best National Music Video	"Mind of a Stoner" (shared w/ Wiz Khalifa)	Won	
Ohio Hip Hop Awards	2014	Best National Music Video	"Breaking News"	2nd Place	
Ohio Hip Hop Awards	2014	Best National Collaboration	"Mind of a Stoner" (shared w/ Wiz Khalifa)	Won	
Radio Disney Music Awards	2017	Best Collaboration	"Bad Things" (shared w/ Camila Cabello)	Won	
