= Bloody Valentine (song) =

2020 single by Machine Gun Kelly

Single by Machine Gun Kelly

from the album Tickets to My Downfall
- Released: May 1, 2020
- Genre: Pop-punk; emo pop
- Length: 3:25
- Label: Bad Boy; Interscope
- Songwriters: Nicholas Alex Long; Colson Baker; Derek Ryan Smith; Travis Barker
- Producer: Travis Barker

Machine Gun Kelly singles chronology
"Stay Away" (2020)	"Bloody Valentine" (2020)	"Concert for Aliens" (2020)

Music video
- "Bloody Valentine" on YouTube

"Bloody Valentine" (stylized in all lowercase) is a song by the American musician Machine Gun Kelly, released on May 1, 2020 by Interscope Records. The song is the first single from his fifth studio album Tickets to My Downfall.

== Background ==
The song was written by Machine Gun Kelly with Nicholas Alex Long, Mod Sun, and Travis Barker, with the latter also serving as drummer and producer on the track. The video stars Megan Fox as Machine Gun Kelly's lover. The video was shot in a rented house located in the Los Angeles area. It won the award for "Best Alternative" at the 2020 MTV Video Music Awards. The two also star together in the film Midnight in the Switchgrass.

An acoustic version of the song was released on June 16, 2020, alongside a video directed by Sam Cahill. The song is featured in Tony Hawk's Pro Skater 1 + 2.

== Composition ==
"Bloody Valentine" is a pop-punk and emo pop ballad, featuring synth-pop influences. The song's "iconic intro and verse riff" have been noted as being one of the most memorable moments on the Tickets To My Downfall album. NME compared it to Blink-182's Greatest Hits crammed into one song.

== Accolades ==
Awards and nominations for "Bloody Valentine"
Year	Organization	Award	Result	Ref(s)
2020	MTV Video Music Awards	Best Alternative	Won	
2021	iHeartRadio Music Awards	Alternative Rock Song of the Year	Nominated	

== Live performances ==
On May 12, 2020 in promotion of the track Kelly and Barker did an at home performance of "Bloody Valentine" on The Late Late Show with James Corden, the video has over 3.9 million views on YouTube. On August 30, 2020, Machine Gun Kelly and Travis Barker performed "Bloody Valentine" live at the 2020 MTV Video Music Awards. On November 23, 2020 Machine Gun Kelly performed the song live at the 2020 American Music Awards. Kelly in 2021 performed the track on Jimmy Kimmel Live in a medley including "Bloody Valentine" as well as other Tickets to My Downfall tracks such as "Drunk Face" and "All I Know".

== Personnel ==
Credits adapted from Tidal.

- Machine Gun Kelly – vocals and guitar
- Derek Smith – composing, songwriting
- Scott Skyrzinski – mixing assistance
- Nicholas Alex Long – guitar, bass
- Travis Barker – producer, drums
- Colin Leonard – master engineering
- Neal Avron – mixing

== Charts ==
=== Weekly charts ===
Weekly chart performance for "Bloody Valentine"
Chart (2020)	Peak position
Australia (ARIA)	84
Belgium (Ultratip Bubbling Under Flanders)	26
Canada Hot 100 (Billboard)	40
Canada Rock (Billboard)	6
Czech Republic Singles Digital (ČNS IFPI)	50
Czech Republic Airplay (ČNS IFPI)	40
Global 200 (Billboard)	74
Ireland (IRMA)	78
New Zealand Hot Singles (RMNZ)	11
Scottish Singles Sales (Official Charts)	46
UK Singles (Official Charts)	51
US Billboard Hot 100	50
US Alternative Airplay (Billboard)	2
US Hot Rock & Alternative Songs (Billboard)	3
US Mainstream Rock (Billboard)	27
US Rock & Alternative Airplay (Billboard)	2
US Rolling Stone Top 100	40

=== Year-end charts ===
Year-end chart performance for "Bloody Valentine"
Chart (2020)	Position
US Hot Rock & Alternative Songs (Billboard)	11
US Rock Airplay (Billboard)	20

Chart (2021)	Position
US Hot Rock & Alternative Songs (Billboard)	97
US Rock Airplay (Billboard)	49

== Certifications ==
Certifications for "Bloody Valentine"
Region	Certification	Certified units/sales
Brazil (Pro-Música Brasil)	Gold	20,000^{‡}
Canada (Music Canada)	3× Platinum	240,000^{‡}
Italy (FIMI)	Gold	35,000^{‡}
New Zealand (RMNZ)	Gold	15,000^{‡}
United Kingdom (BPI)	Gold	400,000^{‡}
United States (RIAA)	2× Platinum	2,000,000^{‡}
^{‡} Sales+streaming figures based on certification alone.

== Release history ==
Release history for "Bloody Valentine"
Country	Date	Format	Label	Ref.
Various	May 1, 2020	Digital download; streaming	Bad Boy; Interscope	
Italy	May 15, 2020	Contemporary hit radio	Universal	
