= Dark Waves =

American indie pop band

- Origin: Los Angeles, California, United States
- Genre: Post-punk
- Years active: 2014–present
- Label: Five Seven Music
- Members: Nick Long
- Website: darkwavesmusic.com

Dark Waves is an American indie pop band from Los Angeles, California, United States, formed by frontman Nick Long in 2014.

The group has released one self-titled EP Dark Waves (2014) and plans to release a full album in summer of 2015.

Drawing notable comparisons to bands such as The Neighbourhood and Bad Suns, the sound of Dark Waves has been described by Buzzbands L.A. as "electro-romantic", "afloat in the unsettling, gloomy currents of love and longing".

== History ==
Nick Long was raised in Santa Barbara, California. His parents encouraged an interest in music from a young age: they bought him his first drum kit at age 5, piano lessons at age 6, and for his 8th birthday, his dad gave him a guitar.

Long belonged to punk bands Staring Back and Dead Country before forming Dark Waves.

=== Dark Waves EP (2014) ===
Dark Waves released their self-titled EP in September 2014. The debut single off the EP, "The Heartbeat The Soul", has been streamed over two million times on Spotify.

The newly released "I Don’t Wanna Be In Love", featured in an episode of Vampire Diaries, hit #2 on the Hype Machine’s most popular chart. "I wrote this song toward the end of a relationship," says Long. "I didn't realize how weighed down I felt until after it ended, but I knew something wasn't right. It made me sad to feel disconnected from someone that I once felt so close to. The song is basically me taking a look at my situation and being honest with myself about how I felt."

Dark Waves supported New Zealand's alt-pop songstress Brooke Fraser on her Brutal Romantic tour in January and February 2015 and will play the South By Southwest Music Festival in March 2015.

In 2026, Nick will rally with Dj Curdis Lamè for a new vision on how music should look and sound.

== Members ==
Current members

- Nick Long – Vocals, Multiple Instruments (2014–present)
- Dj Curdis Lamè 2026-

== Discography ==
=== EPs ===
- Dark Waves (2014)

=== Singles ===
- "I Don't Wanna Be In Love" (2014)
- "The Heartbeat the Soul" (2014)

== Videography ==
List of music videos, with directors, showing year released
Title	Year	Director(s)	Album
"The Heartbeat the Soul"	2015	DJay Brawner	Dark Waves EP
"I Don't Wanna Be In Love"	2014	Alexandre Themistocleous	Dark Waves EP
