= Blackbear discography =

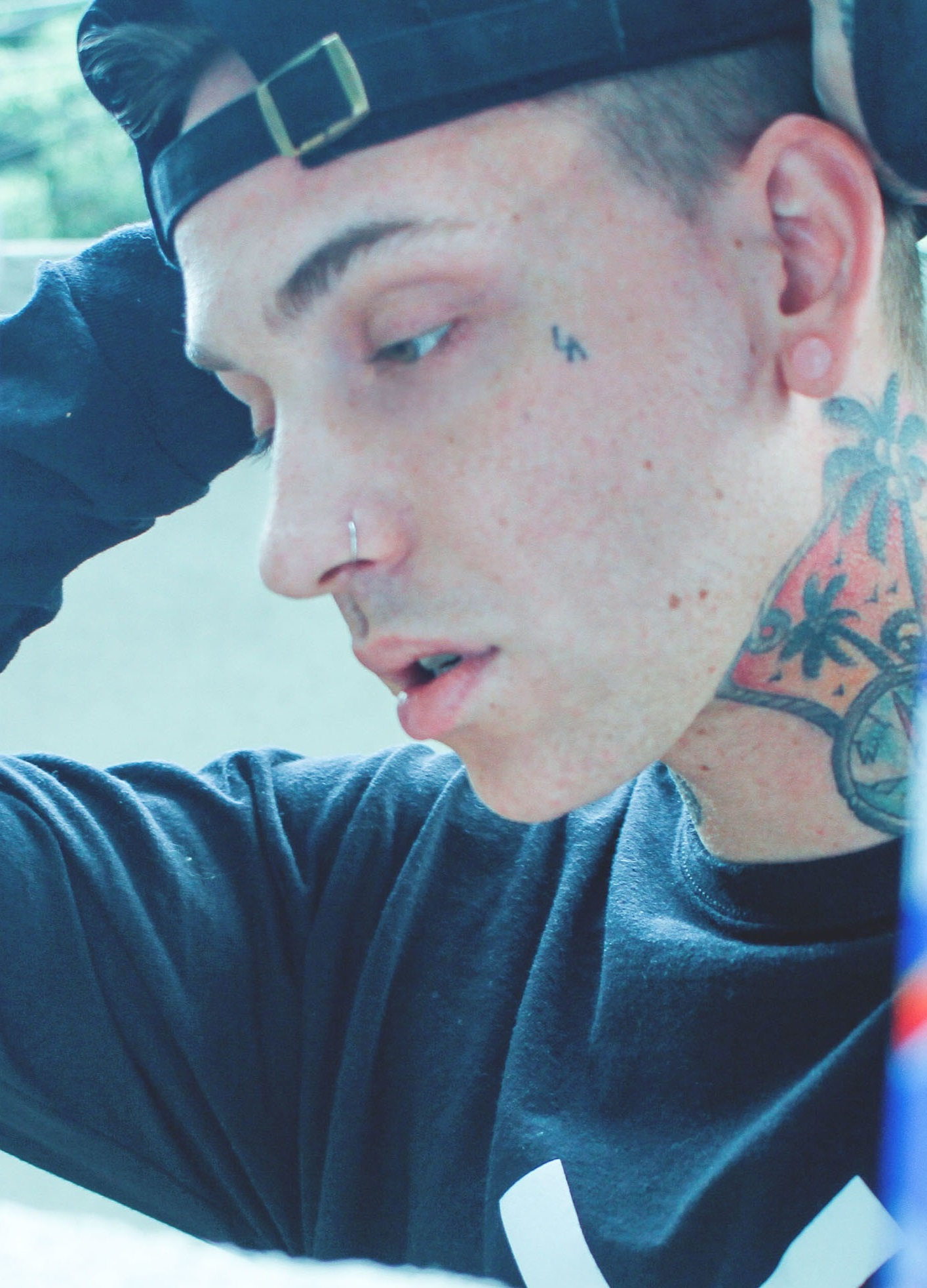
- Studio albums: 6
- EPs: 7
- Singles: 48
- Promotional singles: 11
- Collaborative albums: 3
- Collaborative EPs: 1
- Mixtapes: 2

This is the discography of Blackbear (Matthew Tyler Musto), an American singer, songwriter, and record producer. He has released six studio albums, three collaborative albums, seven extended plays, one collaborative extended play, two mixtapes and 48 singles.

== Albums ==
=== Studio albums ===
Title	Album details	Peak chart positions									Certifications
Title	Album details	US	US R&B /HH	AUS	CAN	NLD	NOR	NZ	SWE	UK	Certifications
Deadroses	Released: February 14, 2015; Label: Beartrap; Formats: CD, digital download	—	37	—	—	—	—	—	—	—	RIAA: Gold
Help	Released: November 27, 2015; Label: Beartrap; Formats: CD, digital download	—	34	—	—	—	—	—	—	—	
Digital Druglord	Released: April 20, 2017; Label: Beartrap, Alamo Records, Interscope; Formats: LP, CD, digital download	14	7	—	19	71	—	40	55	—	RIAA: Gold
Anonymous	Released: April 26, 2019; Label: Beartrap, Alamo, Interscope; Formats: LP, CD, digital download	36	20	—	69	81	—	—	—	—	
Everything Means Nothing	Released: August 21, 2020; Label: Beartrap, Alamo, Interscope; Formats: LP, CD, CC, digital download	15	—	82	19	—	23	37	—	56	RIAA: Gold
In Loving Memory	Released: August 26, 2022; Label: Alamo, Columbia; Formats: LP, CD, digital download	146	—	—	—	—	—	—	—	—	
Analogue Dream	Expected: TBD; Label: Beartrap	To be released									
"—" denotes releases that did not chart or were not released in that territory.

=== Mixtapes ===
Title	Album details	Peak chart positions	
Title	Album details	US	US R&B /HH
Sex: The Mixtape	Released: October 31, 2012; Label: Self-released; Formats: Digital download	—	—
Cybersex	Released: November 27, 2017; Label: Beartrap, Alamo, Interscope; Formats: LP, CD, digital download	47	21
Analogue Off	Released: November 27, 2026; Label: Beartrap; Formats: TBD	To be released	
"—" denotes releases that did not chart or were not released in that territory.

== EPs ==
Title	EP details	Peak chart positions		
Title	EP details	US	US R&B /HH	CAN
Foreplay	Released: April 20, 2012	—	—	—
The Afterglow	Released: April 20, 2014	—	—	—
Dead	Released: June 2, 2015; Label: Beartrap	—	36	—
Drink Bleach	Released: June 17, 2016; Label: Beartrap	—	—	—
Cashmere Noose	Released: August 4, 2016; Label: Beartrap	108	7	—
Salt	Released: April 2, 2017; Label: Beartrap	—	—	—
Misery Lake	Released: August 13, 2021; Label: Beartrap, Alamo, Columbia	102	—	86
"—" denotes releases that did not chart or were not released in that territory.

== Singles ==
=== As lead artist ===
List of singles as lead artist, with selected chart positions, showing year released and album name
Title	Year	Peak chart positions										Certifications	Album
Title	Year	US	US R&B/HH	US R&B	AUS	CAN	IRE	NZ	SWE	UK	WW	Certifications	Album
"Nyla"	2013	—	—	—	—	—	—	—	—	—	—		Non-album single
"Idfc"	2014	—	— (Note: "Idfc" did not enter the Hot R&B/Hip-Hop Songs chart, but peaked at number seven on the Bubbling Under R&B/Hip-Hop Singles chart.)	14	—	—	—	—	—	—	—	RIAA: 3× Platinum; BPI: Platinum; MC: Platinum; RMNZ: 2× Platinum	Deadroses
"4U"	2015	—	—	—	—	—	—	—	—	—	—	RIAA: Gold	Deadroses
"Dirty Laundry"	2015	—	—	—	—	—	—	—	—	—	—	RIAA: Gold; RMNZ: Gold	Deadroses
"Different Hos"	2015	—	—	—	—	—	—	—	—	—	—		Help
"Paragraphs"	2015	—	—	—	—	—	—	—	—	—	—		Help
"Oh Lord"	2015	—	—	—	—	—	—	—	—	—	—		Help
"Slide Thru" (featuring Jerry Good)	2016	—	—	—	—	—	—	—	—	—	—		Help
"Girls Like U"	2016	—	—	—	—	—	—	—	—	—	—		Drink Bleach
"Wanderlust"	2017	—	—	—	—	—	—	—	—	—	—		Cashmere Noose
"Do Re Mi" (solo or featuring Gucci Mane)	2017	40	12	2	—	62	—	— (Note: "Do Re Mi" did not enter the NZ Top 40 Singles Chart, but peaked at number eight on the NZ Heatseeker Singles Chart.)	— (Note: "Do Re Mi" did not enter the Swedish singles chart, but peaked at number 12 on the Heatseeker chart.)	94	—	RIAA: 6× Platinum; BPI: Gold; MC: 4× Platinum	Digital Druglord
"Playboy Shit" (featuring Lil Aaron)	2017	—	—	—	—	—	—	—	—	—	—		Cybersex
"Up in This" (with Tinashe)	2017	—	—	—	—	—	—	—	—	—	—		Cybersex
"Idwk" (with Dvbbs)	2018	—	—	—	—	67	—	— (Note: "IDWK" did not enter the NZ Top 40 Singles Chart, but peaked at number ten on the NZ Heatseeker Singles Chart.)	—	—	—	MC: Platinum	Non-album singles
"The 1"	2018	—	—	—	—	—	—	—	—	—	—		Non-album singles
"Miracles" (with Stalking Gia)	2018	—	—	—	—	—	—	—	—	—	—		Non-album singles
"1 Sided Love"	2019	—	—	—	—	—	—	—	—	—	—		Anonymous
"High1x"	2019	—	—	—	—	—	—	—	—	—	—		Anonymous
"Swear to God"	2019	—	—	—	—	—	—	—	—	—	—		Anonymous
"Hate My Guts"	2019	—	—	—	—	—	—	—	—	—	—		Anonymous
"Dead to Me"	2019	—	—	—	—	—	—	—	—	—	—		Anonymous
"Short Kings Anthem" (with Tiny Meat Gang)	2019	—	—	—	—	—	—	—	—	—	—		Non-album single
"Hot Girl Bummer"	2019	11	6	—	8	24	7	6	18	14	176	RIAA: 4× Platinum; ARIA: 4× Platinum; BPI: Platinum; MC: 5× Platinum; RMNZ: 4× Platinum	Everything Means Nothing
"Tongue Tied" (with Marshmello and Yungblud)	2019	— (Note: "Tongue Tied" did not enter the Billboard Hot 100, but peaked at number 14 on the Bubbling Under Hot 100 chart.)	—	—	—	—	63	— (Note: "Tongue Tied" did not enter the NZ Top 40 Singles Chart, but peaked at number 12 on the NZ Hot Singles Chart.)	—	62	—		Non-album single
"Me & Ur Ghost"	2020	— (Note: "Me & Ur Ghost" did not enter the Billboard Hot 100, but peaked at number 14 on the Bubbling Under Hot 100 chart.)	—	—	—	—	67	— (Note: "Me & Ur Ghost" did not enter the NZ Top 40 Singles Chart, but peaked at number 16 on the NZ Hot Singles Chart.)	— (Note: "Me & Ur Ghost" did not enter the Swedish singles chart, but peaked at number eight on the Heatseeker chart.)	—	—	RIAA: Gold; MC: Platinum; RMNZ: Gold	Everything Means Nothing
"Queen of Broken Hearts"	2020	— (Note: "Queen of Broken Hearts" did not enter the Billboard Hot 100, but peaked at number 22 on the Bubbling Under Hot 100 chart.)	—	—	—	—	—	— (Note: "Queen of Broken Hearts" did not enter the NZ Top 40 Singles Chart, but peaked at number 15 on the NZ Hot Singles Chart.)	—	—	—	RIAA: Gold; MC: Gold	Everything Means Nothing
"My Ex's Best Friend" (with Machine Gun Kelly)	2020	20	—	—	22	26	34	— (Note: "My Ex's Best Friend" did not enter the NZ Top 40 Singles Chart, but peaked at number six on the NZ Hot Singles Chart.)	— (Note: "My Ex’s Best Friend" did not enter the Swedish Singellista Chart, but peaked at number 15 on the Swedish Heatseeker Chart.)	30	25	RIAA: 3× Platinum; ARIA: Platinum; BPI: Gold; MC: 2× Platinum; RMNZ: Platinum	Tickets to My Downfall
"Hard on Yourself" (with Charlie Puth)	2020	—	—	—	—	—	—	— (Note: "Hard on Yourself" did not enter the NZ Top 40 Singles Chart, but peaked at number 25 on the NZ Hot Singles Chart.)	—	—	—		Non-album single
"Lil Bit"	2020	—	—	—	—	—	—	— (Note: "Lil Bit" did not enter the NZ Top 40 Singles Chart, but peaked at number 32 on the NZ Hot Singles Chart.)	—	—	—		Madden NFL 21
"Cheers" (with Wiz Khalifa)	2020	—	—	—	—	—	—	— (Note: "Cheers" did not enter the NZ Top 40 Singles Chart, but peaked at number eight on the NZ Hot Singles Chart.)	—	—	—		Non-album single
"U Love U" (with Tate McRae)	2021	—	—	—	—	91	—	— (Note: "U Love U" did not enter the NZ Top 40 Singles Chart, but peaked at number nine on the NZ Hot Singles Chart.)	—	—	—		Misery Lake
"Memory" (with Kane Brown)	2021	50	—	—	—	28	—	— (Note: "Memory" did not enter the NZ Top 40 Singles Chart, but peaked at number 12 on the NZ Hot Singles Chart.)	—	—	69	RIAA: Platinum; ARIA: Gold; MC: Platinum	Non-album single
"@ My Worst"	2021	— (Note: "@ My Worst" did not enter the Billboard Hot 100, but peaked at number six on the Bubbling Under Hot 100 chart.)	—	—	—	—	—	— (Note: "@ My Worst" did not enter the NZ Top 40 Singles Chart, but peaked at number 11 on the NZ Hot Singles Chart.)	—	—	—	RIAA: Gold	Misery Lake
"GFY" (with Machine Gun Kelly)	2022	— (Note: "GFY" did not enter the Billboard Hot 100, but peaked at number 23 on the Bubbling Under Hot 100 chart.)	—	—	—	85	—	— (Note: "GFY" did not enter the NZ Top 40 Singles Chart, but peaked at number 14 on the NZ Hot Singles Chart.)	—	—	—		In Loving Memory
"The Idea"	2022	—	—	—	—	—	—	—	—	—	—		In Loving Memory
"Wish I Could Forget" (with Slander and Bring Me the Horizon)	2023	—	—	—	—	—	—	—	—	—	—		Non-album single
"Bark to the Beat" (with Mckenna Grace)	2023	—	—	—	—	—	—	—	—	—	—		Paw Patrol: The Mighty Movie
"Britney in 07"	2025	—	—	—	—	—	—	—	—	—	—		Analogue Dream
"Enemy" (with Sueco)	2026	—	—	—	—	—	—	—	—	—	—		Party's Over
"—" denotes releases that did not chart or were not released in that territory.

=== As featured artist ===
Title	Year	Peak chart positions								Certifications	Album
Title	Year	US	AUS	CAN	IRE	NZ Hot	SCO	UK	WW	Certifications	Album
"Champagne and Pools" (Hoodie Allen featuring Blackbear and Kyle)	2015	—	—	—	—	—	—	—	—		Happy Camper
"Root Beer Float" (Olivia O'Brien featuring Blackbear)	2016	—	—	—	—	—	—	—	—		Non-album single
"Flex Your Way Out" (Sofi de la Torre featuring Blackbear)	2016	—	—	—	—	—	—	—	—		Another. Not Me. I'm Done.
"Escalade" (Lil Aaron with Blackbear)	2017	—	—	—	—	—	—	—	—		Non-album single
"Hit Me Back" (Jacob Sartorius featuring Blackbear)	2017	—	—	—	—	—	—	—	—		Left Me Hangin'
"Talk Is Overrated" (Jeremy Zucker featuring Blackbear)	2017	—	—	—	—	—	—	—	—	RIAA: Gold; MC: Gold	Idle
"Forgetting All About You" (Phoebe Ryan featuring Blackbear)	2017	—	—	—	—	—	—	—	—		James
"Dangerous" (DeathbyRomy featuring Blackbear)	2019	—	—	—	—	—	—	—	—		Non-album single
"Dreamin'" (The Score featuring Blackbear)	2019	—	—	—	—	—	—	—	—		Pressure
"Beach Ballin'" (Yung Pinch featuring Blackbear)	2019	—	—	—	—	—	—	—	—		Back 2 the Beach
"No Service in the Hills" (Cheat Codes featuring Trippie Redd, Blackbear and Prince$$ Rosie)	2020	—	—	—	—	—	—	—	—		Hellraisers, Pt. 2
"Worry About Me" (Ellie Goulding featuring Blackbear)	2020	—	—	—	—	16	69	78	—		Brightest Blue
"Monsters" (All Time Low featuring Blackbear or Blackbear and Demi Lovato)	2020	55	—	—	—	—	—	—	—	RIAA: Gold; ARIA: Platinum; BPI: Silver; MC: Platinum; RMNZ: Gold	Wake Up, Sunshine
"Go Dumb" (Y2K and the Kid Laroi featuring Blackbear and Bankrol Hayden)	2020	—	—	—	—	29	—	—	—		Non-album singles
"Tinted Eyes" (Dvbbs featuring Blackbear and 24kGoldn)	2020	—	—	62	—	—	—	—	—	MC: Platinum	Non-album singles
"So Sick" (Kiiara featuring Blackbear)	2020	—	—	—	—	—	—	—	—		Lil Kiiwi
"Hate the Way" (G-Eazy featuring Blackbear)	2020	71	—	80	—	4	—	—	109	MC: Gold	These Things Happen Too (Deluxe)
"Jealousy" (Mike Posner featuring Blackbear)	2021	—	—	—	—	— (Note: "Jealousy" did not enter the NZ Top 40 Singles Chart, but peaked at number 39 on the NZ Hot Singles Chart.)	—	—	—		Non-album single
"Love It When You Hate Me" (Avril Lavigne featuring Blackbear)	2022	—	—	76	—	9	—	— (Note: "Love It When You Hate Me" did not enter the UK Singles Chart, but peaked at number 40 on the UK Singles Sales Chart.)	—		Love Sux
"IDGAF" (BoyWithUke featuring Blackbear)	2022	99	95	61	52	—	—	48	117	RIAA: Gold; RMNZ: Gold	Serotonin Dreams
"FMK" (Gayle featuring Blackbear)	2022	—	—	—	—	—	—	—	—		A Study of the Human Experience Volume Two
"Dancing With the Stars" (Gunnr featuring Blackbear)	2025	—	—	—	—	—	—	—	—		Non-album single
"—" denotes releases that did not chart or were not released in that territory.

=== Promotional singles ===
Title	Year	Peak chart positions	Album
Title	Year	US Rock	Album
"Deadroses"	2015	—	Deadroses
"If I Could I Would Feel Nothing"	2017	—	Digital Druglord
"Make Daddy Proud"	2017	—	Digital Druglord
"Bright Pink Tims" (featuring Cam'ron)	2017	—	Cybersex
"Gucci Linen" (featuring 2 Chainz)	2017	—	Cybersex
"Ice Out" (Fat Nick featuring Blackbear)	2018	—	Generation Numb
"I Feel Bad"	2020	—	Everything Means Nothing
"I Feel 2 Much"	2020	—	Everything Means Nothing
"I Felt That"	2020	—	Everything Means Nothing
"If I Were U" (with Lauv)	2020	—	Everything Means Nothing
"Toxic Energy" (with The Used)	2022	46	In Loving Memory

== Other charted and certified songs ==
List of other charted and certified songs, with selected chart positions, showing year released and album name
Title	Year	Peak chart positions					Certifications	Album
Title	Year	US	CAN	IRE	NZ Hot	UK	Certifications	Album
"90210" (featuring G-Eazy)	2015	—	—	—	—	—	RIAA: Gold	Deadroses
"Chateau"	2017	—	—	—	—	—	RIAA: Gold; RMNZ: Gold	Digital Druglord
"I Miss the Old U"	2017	—	—	—	—	—	RIAA: Platinum; RMNZ: Gold	Digital Druglord
"Anxiety" (with FRND)	2017	—	—	—	—	—	RIAA: Gold	Cybersex
"Alone in a Room Full of People"	2021	—	—	—	30	—		Misery Lake
"Make Up Sex" (Machine Gun Kelly featuring Blackbear)	2022	59	33	74	3	55	MC: Gold	Mainstream Sellout
"—" denotes releases that did not chart or were not released in that territory.

== Guest appearances ==
Title	Year	Other artist(s)	Album
"End of the Road"	2012	Machine Gun Kelly	Lace Up
"Leaving in the Morning"	2013	Artist vs. Poet	Remember This (Anniversary Edition)
"Jiggy"	2014	Pettros	Non-album song
"If It Kills Me"	2015	Jack Novak	Non-album song
"Surprise Party"	2016	Hoodie Allen	Happy Camper
"We Out Here"	2016	Coolwater Set, Thurz	Non-album song
"Ocean Eyes (Blackbear Remix)"	2017	Billie Eilish	Ocean Eyes (The Remixes)
"Spent All My Money..."	2017	Mod Sun	Movie
"Popstar"	2017	Neesly, AJ Tracey	Non-album song
"About You"	2018	Mike Shinoda	Post Traumatic
"Falling (Remix)"	2018	Trevor Daniel	Non-album song
"Right Now"	2019	sober rob	Reset
"back2you"	2019	nothing,nowhere.	Bloodlust
"Couldn't Say Sorry"	2019	24hrs	Valentino Twenty
"Dead & Over"	2020	R I L E Y	Loss Angeles
"Am I High Rn"	2020	Quinn XCII	A Letter To My Younger Self
"Regina George"	2020	24hrs	Non-album song
"Be Happy (Remix)"	2020	Dixie D'Amelio, Lil Mosey	Non-album song
"Pill Breaker"	2021	Trippie Redd, Travis Barker, Machine Gun Kelly	Neon Shark vs Pegasus
"Anxiety Wins"	2025	Joyner Lucas	ADHD 2
"The City Is At War (Remix)"	2025	Cobra Starship	Non-album song

== Writing, production and feature credits ==
Song	Year	Artist	Album	Contribution	Certification
"End of the Road"	2011	Machine Gun Kelly featuring Blackbear	Lace Up	Feature, writer	
"Boyfriend"	2012	Justin Bieber	Believe	Co-writer, guitar production, background vocals	6× Platinum
"Windows Down"	2012	Big Time Rush	Elevate	Writer	
"OshFest"	2013	Mike Posner featuring Blackbear	Non-album songs	Feature, writer	
"Marauder Music"	2013	Mike Posner featuring Blackbear	The Layover	Feature, writer, producer	
"Numb"	2014	Nick Jonas featuring Angel Haze	Nick Jonas	Co-writer	
"Remember You"	2014	G-Eazy featuring Blackbear	These Things Happen	Feature, writer, producer	Gold
"Sleepless"	2014	G-Eazy featuring Nylo	These Things Happen	Producer	
"These Things Happen"	2014	G-Eazy	These Things Happen	Producer	
"This Fuckin Song"	2014	The Janoskians	Non-album single	Writer	
"Toy Guns"	2014	Tokyo Police Club	Forcefield	Co-writer, co-producer	
"Through the Wire"	2014	Tokyo Police Club	Forcefield	Co-writer, co-producer	
"Leave Your Love"	2015	Tyler Carter	Leave Your Love	Co-writer	
"Sophisticated"	2015	Tyler Carter	Leave Your Love	Co-writer, producer	
"Tears on the Runway, Pt. 1"	2015	Tyler Carter featuring Nylo	Leave Your Love	Producer	
"Shoot 'Em Down"	2015	Mod Sun featuring Machine Gun Kelly and Blackbear	Look Up	Feature, writer, producer	
"Surprise Party"	2015	Hoodie Allen featuring Blackbear	Happy Camper	Feature, writer	Gold
"Champagne & Pools"	2015	Hoodie Allen featuring Blackbear and Kyle	Happy Camper	Feature, writer, producer	
"Ocean Eyes" (Blackbear remix)	2015	Billie Eilish featuring Blackbear	Non-album singles	Feature, writer, producer	
"All I Want"	2015	Daniel Skye featuring Cameron Dallas	Non-album singles	Writer, producer	
"Crash with Me"	2016	Gnash	U	Producer	
"Root Beer Float"	2016	Olivia O'Brien featuring Blackbear	Non-album single	Feature, writer, producer	
"Holy Water"	2016	Ro James	Eldorado	Co-writer	
"I Doubt It"	2016	Travis Mills featuring Blackbear and Skizzy Mars	While You Wait	Feature, writer, producer	
"Chemistry"	2016	Skizzy Mars featuring Blackbear	Non-album single	Feature, writer, producer	
"Sorry for Now"	2017	Linkin Park	One More Light	Co-producer	
"We Used To"	2017	Charles Quirk	Non-album single	Producer	
"No Hands"	2017	Forever M.C. & it's different featuring Blackbear and MAX	Non-album single	Feature	
"Talk Is Overrated"	2017	Jeremy Zucker featuring Blackbear	Idle	Feature, co-writer	
"Smoke & Drive"	2018	Yung Pinch featuring Blackbear & P-Lo	Non-album single	Feature, co-writer	
"About You"	2018	Mike Shinoda featuring Blackbear	Post Traumatic	Feature, Co-writer	
"So Sick"	2020	Kiiara featuring Blackbear	Lil Kiiwi	Feature	
"Beautiful Mistakes"	2021	Maroon 5 featuring Megan Thee Stallion	Jordi	Producer, co-writer	Platinum
"Echo"	2021	Maroon 5 featuring Blackbear	Jordi	Feature, co-writer	

== With Polaroid ==
=== Albums ===
Title	Album details
Paint the Town	Released: 2008; Label: Leakmob

=== EPs ===
Title	Album details
Inside and Out	Released: 2007; Label: Independent

== With Me, The Machine ==
=== Albums ===
Title	Album details
New Masters	Released: 2009; Label: Independent

== As Mat Musto ==
=== Albums ===
Title	Album details
Exposure	Released: October 10, 2010; Label: Independent

=== EPs ===
Title	Album details
Brightness	Released: November 21, 2008; Label: Independent
Contrast	Released: October 15, 2009; Label: Independent
Year of the Blackbear	Released: July 4, 2011; Label: Independent
Gone For Good	Released: October 8, 2011; Label: Independent

== With Hotel Motel ==
Title	Album details
Pink Lemonade	Released: April 1, 2016; Label: Hotel Motel; Formats: LP, digital download

== With Mansionz ==
Title	Album details	Peak chart positions
Title	Album details	US
Mansionz	Released: March 24, 2017; Label: Beartrap, Monster Mountain, Island; Formats: LP, digital download	67
Mansionz 2	Released: October 31, 2023; Label: Beartrap, Monster Mountain, Island; Format: Digital download, LP	—
"—" denotes releases that did not chart or were not released in that territory.
