= So Sick (disambiguation) =

"So Sick" is a 2005 song by Ne-Yo.

So Sick may also refer to:

- "So Sick", a song by Michael Kiske from his 1996 album Instant Clarity
- "So Sick", 2020 song by Blackbear featuring Kiiara from the album Lil Kiiwi
