= Digital Druglord =

Studio album by blackbear
- Released: April 21, 2017
- Genre: Alternative R&B; trap
- Length: 32:12
- Label: Beartrap; Alamo; Interscope
- Producer: Blackbear; Andrew Goldstein; Ayo; Bizness Boi; Blackbear; EY; FWDSLXSH; J. Hill; Jeremy Zucker; Neenyo; Nicholas Pelletier; Prep Bijan; Rad Cat; Tarro; Th3ory

Blackbear chronology
| Salt (2017) | Digital Druglord (2017) | Cybersex (2017) |

Singles from Digital Druglord
- 1. "Do Re Mi" Released: March 18, 2017

Professional ratings
Review scores
| Source | Rating |
|---|---|
| CU Independent | 7/10 |
| The Diamondback | 2.5/4 stars |

Digital Druglord (stylized in all lowercase) is the third studio album by American singer and songwriter Blackbear. It was released on April 21, 2017 through Beartrap, Alamo Records, and Interscope Records. His first album under a major record label, it follows the release of his previous independent albums, Deadroses and Help in 2015, as well as his EP, Salt which was released two weeks prior. The album includes guest appearances from Gucci Mane, Juicy J, Stalking Gia and 24hrs. It was preceded by one single; "Do Re Mi".

== Singles ==
The album's lead single, "Do Re Mi" was released on March 17, 2017. It reached number 40 on the Billboard Hot 100.

"If I Could I Would Feel Nothing" and "Make Daddy Proud" were released as promotional singles on December 2, 2016 and January 29, 2017, respectively.

== Commercial performance ==
The album debuted at number fourteen on the US Billboard 200 with 29,000 album-equivalent units in its first week. The album was certified gold by the Recording Industry Association of America (RIAA) for combined sales and album-equivalent units of over 500,000 copies in the United States.

== Track listing ==
Credits were adapted from iTunes and Tidal.

Digital Druglord
| No. | Title | Writer(s) | Producer(s) | Length |
|---|---|---|---|---|
| 1. | "Hell Is Where I Dreamt of U and Woke Up Alone" | Matthew Musto | Blackbear | 2:50 |
| 2. | "Moodz" (featuring 24hrs) | Musto; Robert Davis; Sean Seaton; Adeyinka Bankole-Ojo; Phillip Conley | Neenyo; FWDSLXSH | 3:40 |
| 3. | "I Miss the Old U" | Musto; Nicholas Pelletier; David Ramos; Phillip Conley | Tarro; Nicholas Pelletier | 3:31 |
| 4. | "Do Re Mi" | Musto; Andrew Goldstein | Blackbear; Goldstein | 3:32 |
| 5. | "Wish U the Best" (featuring Stalking Gia) | Musto; Christian Ariza; Goldstein; Tiffany Giardina; Robert McCurdy; Christopher Petrosino | Rad Cat; Goldstein | 2:34 |
| 6. | "Juicy Sweatsuits" (featuring Juicy J) | Musto; Austin Owens; Jordan Houston; Eyobed Getachew; Bankole-Ojo; Phillip Conley | FWDSLXSH; Ayo; EY | 3:03 |
| 7. | "Double" | Musto; Andre Robertson; David Hughes; Cardell McManus; Phillip Conley | Bizness Boi; Prep Bijan; Th3ory | 3:00 |
| 8. | "If I Could I Would Feel Nothing" | Musto; Joseph Hill; Aaron Miller; Aaron Harmon; Jordan Reyes | J. Hill | 3:04 |
| 9. | "Chateau" | Musto; Ramos | Tarro | 3:32 |
| 10. | "Make Daddy Proud" | Musto; Peter Hortaridis; Jeremy Zucker | Jeremy Zucker | 3:28 |
| Total length: | | | | 32:12 |

Physical track
| No. | Title | Writer(s) | Producer(s) | Length |
|---|---|---|---|---|
| 11. | "Do Re Mi" (featuring Gucci Mane) | Musto; Rodric Davis; Goldstein | Blackbear; Goldstein | 3:53 |
| Total length: | | | | 36:05 |

Notes

- ^{^[a]} signifies a co-producer
- All song titles are stylized in lowercase letters.

== Personnel ==
Credits were adapted from Tidal.

Performers

- Blackbear – primary artist
- 24hrs – featured artist (track 2)
- Stalking Gia – featured artist (track 5)
- Juicy J – featured artist (track 6)

Production

- Blackbear – producer (tracks 1, 4)
- Neenyo – producer (track 2)
- FWDSLXSH – producer (tracks 2, 6)
- Tarro – producer (tracks 3, 9)
- Nicholas Pelletier – producer (track 3)
- Andrew Goldstein – producer (tracks 4, 5)
- Rad Cat – producer (track 5)
- Ayo – producer (track 6)
- EY – producer (track 6)
- Bizness Boi – producer (track 7)
- Prep Bijan – producer (track 7)
- Th3ory – producer (track 7)
- J. Hill – producer (track 8)
- Jeremy Zucker – producer (track 10)

== Charts ==
=== Weekly charts ===
| Chart (2017) | Peak position |
|---|---|
| Canadian Albums (Billboard) | 19 |
| Dutch Albums (Album Top 100) | 71 |
| New Zealand Albums (RMNZ) | 40 |
| Swedish Albums (Sverigetopplistan) | 55 |
| US Billboard 200 | 14 |
| US Top R&B/Hip-Hop Albums (Billboard) | 7 |

=== Year-end charts ===
| Chart (2017) | Position |
|---|---|
| US Billboard 200 | 128 |
| US Top R&B/Hip-Hop Albums (Billboard) | 43 |

== Certifications ==
| Region | Certification | Certified units/sales |
|---|---|---|
| New Zealand (RMNZ) | Gold | 7,500^{‡} |
| United States (RIAA) | Gold | 500,000^{‡} |
^{‡} Sales+streaming figures based on certification alone.
