= Tinted Eyes =

2020 song by Dvbbs

Single by Dvbbs featuring Blackbear and 24kGoldn
- Released: June 5, 2020
- Genre: Deep house; pop; R&B
- Length: 2:55
- Label: Ultra Records
- Songwriters: Alex van den Hoef; Chris van den Hoef; Andrew Bullimore; Benjamin Shubert; Christian Michael Dold; Golden Landis Von Jones; Matthew Musto
- Producers: Dvbbs; Diamond Pistols

Dvbbs singles chronology
"Wrong About You" (2020)	"Tinted Eyes" (2020)	"Swim" (2020)

Blackbear singles chronology
"Go Dumb" (2020)	"Tinted Eyes" (2020)	"Queen of Broken Hearts" (2020)

24kGoldn singles chronology
"Unbelievable" (2020)	"Tinted Eyes" (2020)	"Water Run Dry" (2020)

Music video
- "Tinted Eyes" on YouTube

"Tinted Eyes" is a song by Canadian electronic music duo Dvbbs featuring American singer Blackbear and American rapper 24kGoldn. It was released on June 5, 2020.

== Background ==
The single marks the second collaboration between Dvbbs and Blackbear after "Idwk", with all proceeds of the single being donated to Black Lives Matter.

== Composition ==
"Tinted Eyes" is described as being "a thumping bass-driven house influenced song".

== Music video ==
Dvbbs released the video on June 5, 2020, via Ultra Music, featuring all the artists involved in the song.

== Charts ==
=== Weekly charts ===
Chart (2020)	Peak position
Canada Hot 100 (Billboard)	62
Canada CHR/Top 40 (Billboard)	20
Canada Hot AC (Billboard)	40
US Hot Dance/Electronic Songs (Billboard)	23

=== Year-end charts ===
Chart (2020)	Position
US Hot Dance/Electronic Songs (Billboard)	69

== Certifications ==
Region	Certification	Certified units/sales
Canada (Music Canada)	Platinum	80,000^{‡}
^{‡} Sales+streaming figures based on certification alone.
