= Jesse Wilson (music producer) =

American producer and songwriter

- Other names: Corparal, J. Wilson, Corpcobain
- Musical career
- Genres: R&B; soul; hip-hop; pop
- Occupations: Producer; songwriter; multi-instrumentalist
- Labels: The Art of Winning, LLC

Jesse "Corparal" Wilson is an American songwriter and producer best known for his writing collaborations with R&B artist Ne-Yo across his discography, songwriting work with K. Michelle and Blackbear, contributing to several seasons of Fox musical TV series Empire, and co-writing standout single "Virgo's Groove" from Beyonce's 2022 album Renaissance.

== Selected songwriting & production credits ==
Title	Year	Artist	Album
"Telekinesis"	2009	Ne-Yo	Libra Scale
"First Dance" (featuring Usher)	2009	Justin Bieber	My World
"I'm Dumb"	2009	Gorilla Zoe	Don't Feed da Animals
"Do We Have To"	2011	Musiq Soulchild	MusiqInTheMagiq
"Likethesun"	2011	Musiq Soulchild	MusiqInTheMagiq
"Crazy" (featuring Gucci Mane)	2011	Gorilla Zoe	King Kong
"Talent Show"	2011	Snoop Dogg & Wiz Khalifa	Mac & Devin Go to High School (soundtrack)
"Carry On (Her Letter to Him)"	2012	Ne-Yo	R.E.D.
"Respect That You Earn" (featuring Ne-Yo & Wale)	2013	Yo Gotti	I Am
"Tired of Dreaming" (featuring Ne-Yo & Rick Ross)	2013	Wale	The Gifted
"Plastic Roses"	2013	Jessica Sanchez	Me, You & the Music
"Thank You"	2013	Celine Dion	Loved Me Back to Life
"Judge Me"	2014	K. Michelle	Anybody Wanna Buy a Heart?
"Build a Man"	2014	K. Michelle	Anybody Wanna Buy a Heart?
"A House Is Not a Home" (featuring Ne-Yo)	2014	Dionne Warwick	Feels So Good
"Money Can't Buy" (featuring Jeezy)	2015	Ne-Yo	Non-Fiction
"Congratulations"	2015	Ne-Yo	Non-Fiction
"Come Over" (Bonus track)	2015	Ne-Yo	Non-Fiction
"Ballerina" (Bonus track)	2015	Ne-Yo	Non-Fiction
"Worth It"	2015	Ne-Yo	Non-Fiction
"No Doubt About It"	2015	Empire Cast	Empire: Original Soundtrack Season 2 Volume 1
"Ain't About the Money"	2015	Empire Cast	Empire: Original Soundtrack Season 2 Volume 1
"Heavy"	2015	Empire Cast	Empire: Original Soundtrack Season 2 Volume 1
"Battle Cry"	2015	Empire Cast	Empire: Original Soundtrack Season 2 Volume 1
"Do Something With It"	2015	Empire Cast	Empire: Original Soundtrack Season 2 Volume 1
"All I Got"	2016	K. Michelle	More Issues Than Vogue
"Memphis"	2016	K. Michelle	More Issues Than Vogue
"Two"	2016	Heart	Beautiful Broken
"Shine on Me"	2016	Empire Cast	Empire: Original Soundtrack Season 2 Volume 2
"My Own Thang"	2016	Empire Cast	Empire: Original Soundtrack Season 2 Volume 2
"Gucci Linen" (featuring 2 Chainz)	2017	Blackbear	Cybersex
"Bright Pink Tims" (featuring Cam'ron)	2017	Blackbear	Cybersex
"E.Z." (featuring Machine Gun Kelly)	2017	Blackbear	Cybersex
"Thursday/Froze Over (Interlude)"	2017	Blackbear	Cybersex
"Glo_Up" (featuring Rick Ross)	2017	Blackbear	Cybersex
"Santa Monica & La Brea"	2017	Blackbear	Cybersex
"Reset the Night"	2018	Ne-Yo	Good Man
"Denim"	2018	Priscilla Renea	Coloured
"Angels and Harmony" (featuring Ne-Yo)	2019	Jane Zhang	Past Progressive
"It's All Gonna Burn"	2019	Blackbear	Anonymous
"Dead to Me"	2019	Blackbear	Anonymous
"Virgo's Groove"	2022	Beyoncé	Renaissance
"Smells Like Money"	2022	Yung Gravy	Marvelous
"Hard Knocks"	2024	Snoop Dogg	Missionary
"Don't Be That Guy"	2026	Jhené Aiko	Westside Whimsy

== Awards and nominations ==
Year	Ceremony	Award	Result	Ref
2023	65th Annual Grammy Awards	Grammy Award for Album of the Year (Renaissance)	Nominated	
