= In Loving Memory (Blackbear album) =

Studio album by Blackbear
- Released: August 26, 2022
- Genre: Pop punk
- Length: 38:07
- Labels: Alamo; Columbia
- Producers: Blackbear; Andrew Goldstein; Travis Barker

Blackbear chronology
Misery Lake (2021)	In Loving Memory (2022)	Analogue Dream (2026)

Singles from In Loving Memory
- 1. "GFY" Released: May 27, 2022; 2. "The Idea" Released: July 8, 2022

In Loving Memory (stylized in all lowercase) is the sixth studio album by American singer-songwriter and producer Blackbear. It was released on August 26, 2022 through Alamo and Columbia Records and follows the EP Misery Lake (2021) and his previous studio album Everything Means Nothing (2020). The album features appearances from Bert McCracken of The Used, Jordan Pundik of New Found Glory, Anthony Raneri of Bayside, and Machine Gun Kelly. Two singles, "GFY" with Machine Gun Kelly, and "The Idea", were released in promotion of the album. Produced by Blackbear, Andrew Goldstein, and Travis Barker, the album shifts from Blackbear's previous pop-rap sound to pop-punk.

== Background and composition ==
Lyrically, In Loving Memory described Blackbear tackling subjects such as the loss of his father in 2021, parenthood, and mental health. He further described it in an interview with Alternative Press:

The whole idea behind the album is [a] letter to my father who passed away, and I never got to say goodbye. I’m making this music that is true to my roots, and I’m bringing out guest stars like Jordan Pundik from New Found Glory and Bert McCracken from the Used. I’m paying homage to the bands I grew up listening to with this album.

— Blackbear

Inspiration for the album included Jimmy Eat World's Bleed American, Terminal, Acceptance, and Third Eye Blind. It is also Blackbear's return to the punk genre as he was in the band Polaroid in 2007-2008.

The song "Nothing Matters" features an audio sample from the Aqua Teen Hunger Force episode "Mail Order Bride", of Carl (voiced by Dave Willis) saying "It don't matter. None of this matters".

== Singles and promotion ==
"GFY" with Machine Gun Kelly was released on May 27, 2022 as the lead single of the album. It peaked at number twelve on the Hot Rock & Alternative Songs Billboard chart. "The Idea" was released on July 8, 2022 as the second single. It peaked at number thirty-three on the Hot Rock & Alternative Songs chart. "Toxic Energy" with Bert McCracken of The Used was released on August 5, 2022 as the only promotional single from the album.

Blackbear embarked on the Nothing Matters Tour across the US throughout September 2022 in promotion of the album.

== Critical reception ==
Matt Collar of AllMusic gave the album a positive review, calling it "one of [Blackbear's] funnest and most infectiously listenable albums."

== Track listing ==
All tracks are written by Matthew Musto, Andrew Goldstein, and Travis Barker, with additional writers noted below.

In Loving Memory track listing
No.	Title	Writer(s)	Length
1.	"I Don't Love Me"		3:19
2.	"Dead Inside"	Joe Kirkland	3:03
3.	"Toxic Energy" (featuring the Used)	Kirkland; Jordan Schmidt	3:11
4.	"Nothing Matters" (featuring New Found Glory)	Kirkland	3:23
5.	"GFY" (featuring Machine Gun Kelly)	Colson Baker; Omer Fedi; Sean Foreman	2:52
6.	"Broken World"	Kirkland	3:47
7.	"Painkiller"	Kirkland	3:04
8.	"FUILU"		2:55
9.	"The Idea"	Kirkland	3:23
10.	"Poltergeist" (featuring Bayside)	Kirkland; Hudson Bull Prichett	3:28
11.	"Back In Rehab"	Kirkland; Mike Posner	2:38
12.	"Hazel Inside"	Kirkland; Posner	3:04
Total length:			38:07

== Personnel ==
Credits are adapted from Tidal.

- Matthew Musto – vocals (all tracks), production (tracks 1–4, 6–12), executive production
- Andrew Goldstein – production, engineering
- Travis Barker – drums (all tracks), production (1–4, 6–12), executive production
- Kevin "Thrasher" Gruft – engineering
- Nick Morzov – engineering
- Adam Hawkins – mixing
- Dave Kutch – mastering
- Bert McCracken – vocals (3)
- Dylan McLean – engineering (3)
- Jordan Pundik – vocals (4)
- David Willis – vocals (4)
- Machine Gun Kelly – vocals (5)
- Omer Fedi – additional production (5)
- Anthony Raneri – vocals (10)
- Tyler Serebreni – creative direction
- Allan Johnson – graphics
- Jason Landis – photography
