= Hot Girl Bummer =

2019 single by Blackbear

Single by Blackbear

from the album Everything Means Nothing
- Released: August 23, 2019
- Genre: Alternative R&B
- Length: 3:08
- Label: Beartrap; Alamo; Interscope
- Songwriters: Matthew Musto; Andrew Goldstein
- Producers: Blackbear; FRND

Blackbear singles chronology
| "Dangerous" (2019) | "Hot Girl Bummer" (2019) | "Tongue Tied" (2019) |

Music video
- "Hot Girl Bummer" [Low Budget Video] on YouTube

Music video
- "Hot Girl Bummer" [Big Budget Music Video] on YouTube

"Hot Girl Bummer" (stylized in all lowercase) is a song by American musician Blackbear. It was released on August 23, 2019 through Beartrap as the lead single from his fifth studio album Everything Means Nothing (2020). The song's title was inspired by Megan Thee Stallion's 2019 single "Hot Girl Summer" and was written and produced by Musto and Andrew Goldstein.

"Hot Girl Bummer" had peaked at number 11 on the US Billboard Hot 100, received a 6× platinum certification by the Recording Industry Association of America (RIAA), and a 5× platinum certification by Music Canada. While also reaching the top 10 in Australia, Estonia, Ireland, Latvia, New Zealand, and Norway. Two music videos were released for the song. The first music video consisted of Blackbear surrounded by people at a party while sitting on a white couch and the second depicted Blackbear appearing to be sitting on a skyscraper.

== Background and recording ==
Blackbear would announce the song's release, which was met with mixed reactions. The title was considered to be a play on Megan Thee Stallion's "Hot Girl Summer". Musto later had claimed that the song was not a parody, but instead a reference to social media hashtag trend "#hotgirlsummer". Goldstein would speak on the recording and production of the song, saying “We go into the session at his studio at his house, and I played him a voice note of something and I was like ‘I have this really dumb idea but you might be able to make it good.’” He would also confirm that "Hot Girl Bummer" was recorded in three days. On December 12, 2019, the song's remix was released along with Argentine rapper and singer Khea.

== Music video ==
Blackbear would release the low budget music video alongside the song on August 23, 2019. The music video consists of Blackbear surrounded by people at a party while sitting on a white couch, as well as being attached to strings and being moved in a puppet like manner by a man in a suit, which was called a "comment on people who are fake on social media". Musto would later release the high budget music video on November 21, 2019, with Blackbear instead appearing to be sitting on a skyscraper, on a couch, and dancing in a cage.

== Critical reception ==
Chris DeVille writing for Stereogum felt the hook/chorus of the song was "undeniably catchy" and repurposes "Guillermo Díaz's job-quitting Half Baked energy for some post-breakup catharsis."

== Commercial performance ==
"Hot Girl Bummer" is Blackbear's second top 40 hit (as well as his third certified single). The song would debut at number 91 on the Billboard Hot 100, peaking at number 11, keeping its position on the chart for 42 consecutive weeks. It is also his highest-charting record to date, surpassing the number 40 peak of "Do Re Mi".

== Composition ==
The song contains a spoken line by Will Forte in Tim and Eric's Billion Dollar Movie. Stereogum's Chris DeVille would comment on Blackbear's vocals saying that they "are backed by extremely on-trend production: steadily strummed barebones power chords, a minimal trap beat, ominously surging synths."

== Personnel ==
Credits adapted from Qobuz.

- Blackbear – producer, guitar, keyboards, programming
- Andrew Goldstein – producer, guitar, keyboards, programming
- Alex Ghenea – mixer
- Dave Kutch – mastering engineer

== Charts ==
=== Weekly charts ===
Weekly chart performance for "Hot Girl Bummer"
| Chart (2019–2021) | Peak position |
|---|---|
| Australia (ARIA) | 8 |
| Austria (Ö3 Austria Top 40) | 15 |
| Belgium (Ultratop 50 Flanders) | 21 |
| Belgium (Ultratip Bubbling Under Wallonia) | 3 |
| Canada Hot 100 (Billboard) | 24 |
| Canada CHR/Top 40 (Billboard) | 13 |
| Canada Hot AC (Billboard) | 36 |
| Czech Republic Airplay (ČNS IFPI) | 18 |
| Czech Republic Singles Digital (ČNS IFPI) | 14 |
| Denmark (Tracklisten) | 19 |
| Estonia (Eesti Tipp-40) | 8 |
| Finland (Suomen virallinen lista) | 19 |
| France (SNEP) | 110 |
| Germany (GfK) | 17 |
| Greece (IFPI) | 15 |
| Hungary (Single Top 40) | 28 |
| Hungary (Stream Top 40) | 13 |
| Ireland (IRMA) | 7 |
| Italy (FIMI) | 95 |
| Latvia (LAIPA) | 7 |
| Lithuania (AGATA) | 11 |
| Malaysia (RIM) | 17 |
| Netherlands (Dutch Top 40) | 25 |
| Netherlands (Global Top 40) | 10 |
| Netherlands (Single Top 100) | 29 |
| New Zealand (Recorded Music NZ) | 6 |
| Norway (VG-lista) | 8 |
| Portugal (AFP) | 61 |
| Romania (Airplay 100) | 43 |
| Russia Airplay (TopHit) | 36 |
| Scotland Singles (OCC) | 20 |
| Singapore (RIAS) | 11 |
| Slovakia Singles Digital (ČNS IFPI) | 12 |
| Sweden (Sverigetopplistan) | 18 |
| Switzerland (Schweizer Hitparade) | 25 |
| UK Singles (OCC) | 14 |
| US Billboard Hot 100 | 11 |
| US Adult Pop Airplay (Billboard) | 30 |
| US Alternative Airplay (Billboard) | 33 |
| US Dance/Mix Show Airplay (Billboard) | 2 |
| US Hot R&B/Hip-Hop Songs (Billboard) | 6 |
| US Pop Airplay (Billboard) | 2 |
| US Rhythmic Airplay (Billboard) | 5 |
| US Rolling Stone Top 100 | 20 |

=== Year-end charts ===
| Chart (2019) | Position |
|---|---|
| Australia (ARIA) | 92 |
| Hungary (Stream Top 40) | 64 |
| Latvia (LAIPA) | 56 |
| US Hot R&B/Hip-Hop Songs (Billboard) | 96 |

| Chart (2020) | Position |
|---|---|
| Australia (ARIA) | 94 |
| Canada (Canadian Hot 100) | 57 |
| Russia Airplay (Tophit) | 148 |
| US Billboard Hot 100 | 26 |
| US Dance/Mix Show Airplay (Billboard) | 19 |
| US Hot R&B/Hip-Hop Songs (Billboard) | 17 |
| US Mainstream Top 40 (Billboard) | 11 |
| US Rhythmic (Billboard) | 25 |

== Certifications ==
| Region | Certification | Certified units/sales |
|---|---|---|
| Australia (ARIA) | 4× Platinum | 280,000^{‡} |
| Belgium (BRMA) | Gold | 20,000^{‡} |
| Brazil (Pro-Música Brasil) | Diamond | 160,000^{‡} |
| Canada (Music Canada) | 5× Platinum | 400,000^{‡} |
| Denmark (IFPI Danmark) | Platinum | 90,000^{‡} |
| France (SNEP) | Platinum | 200,000^{‡} |
| Germany (BVMI) | Gold | 200,000^{‡} |
| Italy (FIMI) | Gold | 35,000^{‡} |
| New Zealand (RMNZ) | 4× Platinum | 120,000^{‡} |
| Norway (IFPI Norway) | Gold | 30,000^{‡} |
| Poland (ZPAV) | Platinum | 20,000^{‡} |
| Portugal (AFP) | Platinum | 10,000^{‡} |
| Spain (PROMUSICAE) | Gold | 30,000^{‡} |
| United Kingdom (BPI) | Platinum | 600,000^{‡} |
| United States (RIAA) | 6× Platinum | 6,000,000^{‡} |
^{‡} Sales+streaming figures based on certification alone.

== Release history ==
| Region | Date | Format | Label | Ref. |
|---|---|---|---|---|
| Various | August 23, 2019 | Digital download; streaming | Interscope | |
| United States | October 22, 2019 | Rhythmic contemporary | Interscope | |
| United States | October 22, 2019 | Top 40 radio | Interscope | |
