= Tongue Tied (Marshmello, Yungblud and Blackbear song) =

Single by Marshmello, Yungblud and blackbear
- Released: November 13, 2019
- Genre: Pop punk; pop
- Length: 3:06
- Label: Joytime Collective; Geffen; Interscope
- Songwriters: Christopher Comstock; Chris Greatti; Dominic Harrison; John Cunningham; Justin Tranter; Matthew Musto; Mike Crossey
- Producer: Marshmello

Marshmello singles chronology
"Room to Fall" (2019)	"Tongue Tied" (2019)	"Crusade" (2020)

Yungblud singles chronology
"Original Me" (2019)	"Tongue Tied" (2019)	"Weird!" (2020)

Blackbear singles chronology
"Hot Girl Bummer" (2019)	"Tongue Tied" (2019)	"Beach Ballin'" (2019)

Music video
- "Tongue Tied" on YouTube

"Tongue Tied" is a song by American musician Marshmello, English singer-songwriter Yungblud, and American musician blackbear. It was released on November 13, 2019, through Joytime Collective, Geffen and Interscope Records. A remix EP of the song consisting of remixes by Duke & Jones, PatrickReza, Gentlemen's Club, HiGuys and Near X Far was released on January 15, 2020. This is Marshmello's second single with Interscope Records after "Wolves".

== Background ==
This collaboration between Marshmello and blackbear was first hinted in 2017. On July 8, Marshmello revealed for the first time his project, posting the following message on his social media: "Secrets out... marshmello x @iamblackbear coming soon", accompanied by a photo of the rapper wearing the DJ's helmet. He recalled his future collaboration on July 22, 2017, simultaneously he led rumours about upcoming songs with Selena Gomez and Khalid. At the same moment, he said via Twitter: "Marshmello and @iamblackbear ...new music coming". He later added, "All this new music is coming...so many amazing songs with so many amazing people". On September 20, 2017, he announced that the song will be named "Paparazzi". On January 15, 2018, responding to a fan who grew impatient, Marshmello tweeted: "It's coming... patience". Then, during an interview for Capital on October 31, 2019, Blackbear officially revealed the collaboration, with a third artist on the track, Yungblud. However, he did not precise a release date for the track, just unveiling that it will be released before the end of 2019. A few days later, an announcement was made by the three artists via their social media, revealing the title of the song and its release date. On November 14, 2019, responding to a fan who used the hashtag #askmellobludbear on Twitter, created for asking the three artists about the song, Yungblud confessed that the trio "wanted to make a song that encompassed all of their energies".

== Critical reception ==
Kat Bein of Billboard deemed the song "an upbeat, pop punk sing-along full of tweenage agony", with "a Yungblud's tight-throat emo pitch [which] takes the lion's share of the feature, while Blackbear comes in with his smoky-lung R&B style for the second verse". The single marks Marshmello's second foray into rock music in 2019, succeeding his song "Rescue Me" released in June. Writing for NME, Elizabeth Aubrey described the track "a skulking, angsty pop song, which carries a message of unity and empowerment in the face of poor mental health". Matthew Meadow of Your EDM wrote that the song fits sonically in with many Marshmello previous pop collaborations, such as "Project Dreams" and "Friends". Concerning the composition, he noted that the track contains "guitar licks from Marshmello himself". According to him, the two vocalists "both offer an emotional core to the song", giving an arrangement "definitely geared toward radio play with a typical verse/chorus construction, as opposed to the big, pyro-worthy moments at festivals". Phil Scilippa of EDM.com described the song "a notably pop-oriented release, not unlike some of [Marshmello] previous collaborations". He noted that "it's got a summery vibe for being released in the middle of November" but he remarked that Marshmello sound has "always leaned in that direction". Then, he commented the composition, writing that "Blackbear's verses add a hip-hop element, and the chorus sections are sung in a catchy and memorable manner by up-and-comer Yungblud".

== Music video ==
The official music video of the song was premiered on the same day through Marshmello's YouTube channel. Directed by Christian Breslauer, it features American actress Joey King from TV series The Act. In order to promote his presence, Yungblud posted multiple teasers of the clip a few days prior the release. Shot in Los Angeles, it takes place in a dystopian world in which kids are silenced by militarized adults, and where freedom of speech is threatened. Yungblud plays the role of leader of the rebellion captured by a militant group called "Silencers", but just before his capture, he provides important information to another believer played by Joey King who fled just before the insurgency. When the young rebel is captured and neutralized by the Silencers, she is finally rescued by Blackbear and taken to a complex led by Marshmello where the uprising really begins. Kat Bein of Billboard called the video "highly cinematic", and Elizabeth Aubrey of NME described it as "a dystopian video that sees a resistant youth stand up to oppressive forces". In the same way, Katrina Nattress of iHeartRadio felt the visuals "politically charged".

== Charts ==
=== Weekly charts ===
Chart (2019–2020)	Peak position
Austria (Ö3 Austria Top 40)	70
Belgium (Ultratip Bubbling Under Flanders)	33
Belgium (Ultratip Bubbling Under Wallonia)	27
Czech Republic Airplay (ČNS IFPI)	89
Czech Republic Singles Digital (ČNS IFPI)	78
Germany (GfK)	100
Greece (IFPI)	95
Ireland (IRMA)	63
Latvia (LAIPA)	85
Lithuania (AGATA)	63
New Zealand Hot Singles (RMNZ)	12
UK Singles (Official Charts)	62
Ukraine Airplay (TopHit)	32
US Bubbling Under Hot 100 (Billboard)	14
US Hot Rock & Alternative Songs (Billboard)	3

=== Year-end charts ===
Chart (2020)	Position
US Hot Rock & Alternative Songs (Billboard)	66

== Certifications ==
Region	Certification	Certified units/sales
Brazil (Pro-Música Brasil)	Gold	20,000^{‡}
^{‡} Sales+streaming figures based on certification alone.

== Release history ==
Region	Date	Format	Label	Ref.
Various	November 13, 2019	Digital download; streaming	Joytime Collective; Interscope Geffen A&M	
Australia	November 15, 2019	Contemporary hit radio	Universal; Interscope Geffen A&M	
Italy	November 15, 2019	Contemporary hit radio	Universal	
