= Cashmere Noose =

EP by Blackbear
- Released: August 4, 2016 (standard); November 11, 2016 (deluxe)
- Genre: Alternative R&B; synth pop
- Length: 18:36 (standard); 17:10 (deluxe)
- Label: Beartrap
- Producer: Blackbear; The Lab; Bobby Johnson; Dwayne Washington; Aaron Harmon; Aldo; Tarro; Marvin Biano; Rad Cat; Sevnth

Blackbear chronology
Drink Bleach (2016)	Cashmere Noose (2016)	Salt (2017)

Singles from Cashmere Noose
- 1. "Wanderlust" Released: January 13, 2017

Alternative cover
- Deluxe edition cover

Cashmere Noose (stylized in all lowercase) is the fifth EP by American singer Blackbear. It was released on August 4, 2016 exclusively on SoundCloud through his independent record label Beartrap. The name and cover art stem from the product of the same name sold by Enfants Riches Déprimés. The deluxe edition of the EP was released to all other streaming services on November 11, 2016 with extra tracks "Flirt Right Back" and "Wanderlust" while excluding "Spent All My Money On Rick Owens Cargo Pants" featuring Mod Sun and "Princess Complex", however the former was included on Mod Sun's second album Movie as "Spent All My Money..." featuring Blackbear. Only one single, "Wanderlust", was released alongside a lyric video on YouTube on January 13, 2017.

The EP peaked at number 108 on the Billboard 200 and number 7 on the Billboard Top R&B/Hip-Hop Albums chart. The EP also peaked at number one on the iTunes R&N chart and sixth overall on iTunes.

== Track listing ==
Cashmere Noose track listing
No.	Title	Writer(s)	Producer(s)	Length
1.	"Sniffing Vicodin In Paris"	Matthew Musto; Petterson Faustin; Pierre Hugo	Blackbear; The Lab	2:46
2.	"Spent All My Money On Rick Owens Cargo Pants" (featuring Mod Sun)	Musto; Derek Smith	Bobby Johnson	3:43
3.	"Rly Real"	Musto; Dwayne Washington	Washington	2:52
4.	"Sometimes I Want 2 Die"	Musto; Aaron Harmon; Peter Hortaridis; Jordan Reyes	Harmon	2:42
5.	"Princess Complex"	Musto; Aldo	Aldo	3:30
6.	"My Bad Luv"	Musto; David Ramos; Smith	Blackbear; Tarro	3:03
Total length:				18:36

Cashmere Noose (Deluxe) track listing
No.	Title	Writer(s)	Producer(s)	Length
1.	"Sniffing Vicodin In Paris"	Musto; Faustin; Hugo	Blackbear; The Lab	2:46
2.	"Rly Real"	Musto; Washington	Washington	2:52
3.	"Sometimes I Want 2 Die"	Musto; Harmon; Hortaridis; Reyes	Harmon	2:42
4.	"My Bad Luv"	Musto; Ramos; Smith	Blackbear; Tarro	3:03
5.	"Flirt Right Back"	Musto; Mateus Almeida; Christian Ariza; Faustin; Hugo; Ramos	Blackbear; Marvin Biano; The Lab; Rad Cat; Sevnth; Tarro	2:47
6.	"Wanderlust"	Musto; Ariza	Blackbear; Rad Cat	3:00
Total length:				17:10

- All song titles are stylized in lowercase letters.

== Charts ==
Chart (2016)	Peak position
US Billboard 200	108
US Top R&B/Hip-Hop Albums (Billboard)	7
US Independent Albums (Billboard)	7
