= Anonymous (Blackbear album) =

Studio album by Blackbear
- Released: April 26, 2019
- Length: 50:49
- Label: Beartrap; Alamo; Interscope
- Producer: Andrew Goldstein; blackbear; Jesse "Corporal" Wilson; Joe Kirkland; Jurek; Twice as Nice

Blackbear chronology
Cybersex (2017)	Anonymous (2019)	Everything Means Nothing (2020)

Singles from Anonymous
- 1. "1 Sided Love" Released: February 14, 2019; 2. "High1x" Released: March 1, 2019; 3. "Swear to God" Released: March 13, 2019; 4. "Hate My Guts" Released: March 29, 2019; 5. "Dead to Me" Released: April 12, 2019

Anonymous (stylised in all caps) is the fourth studio album by American singer-songwriter Blackbear. It was released on April 26, 2019, by Beartrap, Alamo Records and Interscope Records. Five singles were released in support of the album: "1 Sided Love", "High1x", "Swear to God", "Hate My Guts" and "Dead to Me".

== Track listing ==
Adapted from iTunes.

No.	Title	Writer(s)	Producer(s)	Length
1.	"Pink Rolex"	Matthew Musto; Aaron Harmon; Jordan Reyes	blackbear; Harmon; Reyes	2:16
2.	"Hate My Guts"	Musto; Nicholas Audino; Lewis Hughes; Te Whiti Warbrick	Twice as Nice	2:40
3.	"Drug Dealer"	Musto; Harmon; Reyes	blackbear; Harmon; Reyes	2:46
4.	"Swear to God"	Musto; Andrew Goldstein	FRND; blackbear	2:30
5.	"Make a Mess"	Musto; Harmon; Reyes	blackbear; Harmon; Reyes	2:39
6.	"Sick of It All"	Musto; Ryan Vojtesak; Audino; Hughes; Warbrick	Charlie Handsome; Twice as Nice	2:56
7.	"Changes"	Musto; Joe Kirkland; Louis Tomlinson; James Newman; Stuart Crichton	Kirkland; blackbear	2:34
8.	"High1x"	Musto; Audino; Lewis; Warbrick; Khaled Rohaim	Twice as Nice	2:49
9.	"Down"	Musto; Goldstein	FRND; blackbear	2:19
10.	"Burnt AF"	Musto; Harmon; Reyes	blackbear; Harmon; Reyes	3:36
11.	"Heartbroken"	Catherine Abela: Musto; Brennan Trey Larsen; Harmon	Schmuck the Loyal; Harmon; blackbear	2:14
12.	"1 Sided Love"	Musto; Jurek Simo Reunamäki; Kirkland	Jurek; Twice as Nice; blackbear; Kirkland	2:50
13.	"Losing You"	Musto; Harmon; Reyes	blackbear; Harmon; Reyes	3:25
14.	"It's All Gonna Burn"	Musto; Jesse "Corporal" Wilson	blackbear	3:12
15.	"Dead Balloons"	Musto; Harmon; Reyes	blackbear; Harmon; Reyes	2:10
16.	"Too Close"	Musto; Juan Guerrieri-Maril; McCulloch Reid Sutphin; Blake Slatkin; Jacob Reske	Z3N; 1Mind; Blake; Reske	2:41
17.	"Dead to Me"	Musto; Wilson	Corparal	3:00
18.	"NYLA"	Musto	blackbear; Harmon; Reyes	4:12
Total length:				50:49

Notes

- All titles are capitalised, e.g. "High1x" is stylised as "HIGH1X"
- Track 18 is a remake of blackbear's popular 2013 single of the same name.

== Charts ==
Chart (2019)	Peak position
Canadian Albums (Billboard)	69
Dutch Albums (Album Top 100)	81
US Billboard 200	36
US Top R&B/Hip-Hop Albums (Billboard)	20
