= Cybersex (mixtape) =

Mixtape by Blackbear
- Released: November 27, 2017
- Recorded: 2017
- Genres: Hip hop; trap; R&B
- Length: 51:09
- Labels: Beartrap; Alamo; Interscope
- Producers: Aaron Zuckerman; Ayo; Blackbear; Jesse "Corparal" Wilson; FRND; Good Intent; Hot Sugar; J. Hill; Judge; Keyz; Rad Cat; Tarro; Wax Motif

Blackbear chronology
Digital Druglord (2017)	Cybersex (2017)	Anonymous (2019)

Singles from Cybersex
- 1. "Playboy Shit" Released: October 6, 2017; 2. "Up in This" Released: October 26, 2017

Cybersex (stylized in all lowercase) is the second commercial mixtape by American singer and songwriter Blackbear. It was released on November 27, 2017, through Beartrap, Alamo Records, and Interscope Records. It was preceded by two official singles; "Playboy Shit" featuring Lil Aaron and "Up in This" with Tinashe.

== Background ==
Blackbear released his fifth EP, Salt, on April 2, 2017. He released his third solo studio album Digital Druglord on April 20 to critical acclaim, charting at No. 19 on the Canadian Albums Chart and at No. 14 on the U.S. Billboard 200. While touring as a supporting act on American rock band Fall Out Boy's The Mania Tour in North America, Blackbear began writing and recording his next musical project.

== Promotion ==
Blackbear first revealed Cybersex on his SoundCloud bio during July which many people did not see until his official reveal on August 13, 2017.

=== Singles ===
The first single, "Playboy Shit", featuring American rapper Lil Aaron, was released on October 6, 2017, exclusively on PornHub. "Playboy Shit" was later released for digital download and streaming on October 13. "Up in This", with American singer Tinashe was released as the second single on October 26.

=== Promotional singles ===
The first promotional single, "Bright Pink Tims", featuring Cam'ron, was released on October 20. On November 13, he released the second promotional single, "Gucci Linen", featuring 2 Chainz.

== Track listing ==
Cybersex track listing
No.	Title	Writer(s)	Producer(s)	Length
1.	"Gucci Linen" (featuring 2 Chainz)	Matthew Musto; Jesse Wilson; Jason York; Tauheed Epps	Jesse "Corparal" Wilson	3:32
2.	"Bright Pink Tims" (featuring Cam'ron)	Musto; Wilson; Christian Ariza; Jason York; Cameron Giles	Jesse "Corparal" Wilson; Rad Cat^{[a]}	3:48
3.	"Playboy Shit" (featuring Lil Aaron)	Musto; Aaron Jennings	Aaron Zuckerman; Oliver Francis	3:32
4.	"E.Z." (featuring Machine Gun Kelly)	Musto; Wilson; York; David Ramos; Phillip Conley; Colson Baker	Tarro; Jesse "Corparal" Wilson	4:12
5.	"Up in This" (with Tinashe)	Musto; Jennings; Paul Judge; Danny Chien; Brittany Hazzard	Judge; Wax Motif^{[a]}	3:24
6.	"Anxiety" (with FRND)	Musto; FRND	FRND	3:11
7.	"Thursday/Froze Over (Interlude)"	Musto; Wilson; York	Jesse "Corparal" Wilson; Good Intent	4:19
8.	"I Hope Your Whole Life Sux"	Musto; Nicolas Koenig-Dzialowski	Hot Sugar	2:59
9.	"Down 4 U" (featuring T-Pain)	Musto; Faheem Najm; Ariza	Rad Cat	3:37
10.	"Glo_Up" (featuring Rick Ross)	Musto; Wilson; York; William Roberts	Jesse "Corparal" Wilson	3:30
11.	"Top Priority" (with Ne-Yo)	Musto; Shaffer Smith; Austin Owens	Ayo; Keyz	2:51
12.	"G2G TTYL" (featuring THEY.)	Musto; Dante Jones; Drew Love; Conley	Blackbear	3:01
13.	"Candayapple" (featuring Paul Wall and Riff Raff)	Musto; Joseph Hill; Phillip Conley; Zachary Williams; Paul Slayton; Horst Simco	J. Hill	4:34
14.	"Santa Monica & La Brea"	Musto; Wilson; York; Judge	Blackbear; Jesse "Corparal" Wilson	4:39
Total length:				51:09

Notes

- ^{^[a]} signifies a co-producer
- All song titles are stylized in lowercase letters.

== Personnel ==
Credits were adapted from Tidal.

Performers

- Blackbear – primary artist
- Tinashe – primary artist (track 5)
- Ne-Yo – primary artist (track 11)
- 2 Chainz – featured artist (track 1)
- Cam'ron – featured artist (track 2)
- Lil Aaron – featured artist (track 3)
- Machine Gun Kelly – featured artist (track 4)
- FRND – featured artist (track 6)
- T-Pain – featured artist (track 9)
- Rick Ross – featured artist (track 10)
- THEY. – featured artist (track 12)
- Paul Wall – featured artist (track 13)
- Riff Raff – featured artist (track 13)

Technical

- Blackbear – engineer (track 2)
- Maddox Chhim – mixing engineer (tracks 2, 5)

Production

- Jesse "Corparal" Wilson – producer (tracks 1, 2, 4, 7, 10, 14)
- Rad Cat – co-producer (track 2), producer (track 9)
- Aaron Zuckerman – producer (track 3)
- Tarro – producer (track 4)
- Judge – producer (track 5)
- Wax Motif – co-producer (track 5)
- FRND – producer (track 6)
- Good Intent – producer (track 7)
- Hot Sugar – producer (track 8)
- Ayo – producer (track 11)
- Keyz – producer (track 11)
- Blackbear – producer (tracks 12, 14)
- J. Hill – producer (track 13)

== Charts ==
Chart (2017)	Peak position
New Zealand Heatseeker Albums (RMNZ)	4
US Billboard 200	47
US Top R&B/Hip-Hop Albums (Billboard)	21
