= Andrew Goldstein (musician) =

American singer-songwriter

- Also known as: FRND
- Born: March 17, 1986 (age 40); Reston, Virginia, U.S.
- Genres: Pop; pop rock; pop punk; dance-pop; alternative rock
- Occupations: Musician; singer; songwriter; record producer
- Instruments: Vocals; guitar; piano; bass
- Years active: 2006–present
- Formerly of: The Friday Night Boys

Andrew Goldstein (born March 17, 1986) is an American musician, singer, songwriter, and record producer. He was born in Reston, Virginia, and attended James Madison University, graduating in 2008.

Goldstein began his career by singing in the band The Friday Night Boys on Fueled by Ramen. He has worked across genres with a wide array of artists, including Maroon 5, Megan Thee Stallion, Katy Perry, Tate McRae, Addison Rae, Linkin Park, Britney Spears, Demi Lovato, 5 Seconds of Summer, Blink-182, Kane Brown, blackbear, Yungblud, Reneé Rapp, LANY, Three Days Grace, and ILLENIUM. He also releases music as a solo artist and is sometimes credited under the name FRND (disemvoweling of "friend").

== Discography ==
Year	Artist	Album	Credit
2026	Don Broco	Nightmare Tripping	Co-writer ("Swimming Pools")
2026	Lølø	Single	Co-writer, Producer ("The Punisher")
2026	Marino	Single	Co-writer ("Greed")
2026	Cailin Russo	Don't	Co-writer, producer ("Last Night")
2026	Trueblood	Single	Co-writer, producer ("Make It Out")
2025	Jessica Baio	SACRED	Co-writer, producer ("Sacred")
2025	Illenium	Single	Co-writer, co-producer ("War")
2025	Blackbear	Single	Co-writer, co-producer ("Britney In 07")
2025	Hoshi	Single	Co-writer, producer ("Fallen Superstar")
2025	5 Seconds Of Summer	Everyone's a Star!	Co-writer, producer ("istillfeelthesame")
2025	Said The Sky	Closer To The Sun	Co-writer ("Gotta Get To You")
2025	Alexander Stewart	What If?	Co-writer, co-producer ("The Way A Heart Breaks", "The Boy I Almost Was")
2025	Perrie	Perrie	Co-producer ("You Go Your Own Way", "Punchline", "Forget About Us")
2025	Papa Roach	Single	Co-writer ("Even If It Kills Me")
2025	Mike Posner	The Beginning	Co-writer, co-producer ("High Forever" "Back Around")
2025	Daisy Grenade	Single	Co-writer, co-producer ("Don't Sweat It")
2025	Simple Plan	The Kids In The Crowd - Music From The Documentary Soundtrack	Co-writer ("Nothing Changes")
2025	Bring Me The Horizon	Lo-files	Co-writer ("Darkside.verXx")
2025	Jessica Baio	Single	Co-writer, producer ("bad times")
2025	Good Charlotte	Motel Du Cap	Co-writer ("I Don't Work Here Anymore")
2025	Yellowcard	Single	Co-writer, co-producer ("Take what you want")
2025	Yellowcard	Single	Co-writer, co-producer ("Bedroom Posters")
2025	Three Days Grace	Alienation	Co-writer ("Power")
2025	Leah Kate	Act I: It Doesn't Take a Genius (To Ruin Everything)	Co-producer ("Meltdown")
2025	Kane Brown	The High Road	Producer ("Rescue feat. Khalid")
2025	The Maine	Single	Co-writer ("until the high wears off (dyed silver 2023)")
2025	Amira Elfeky	Surrender	Co-writer, co-producer ("Forever Overdose", "Take Me Under")
2025	Jagwar Twin	Single	Co-writer ("SideQuest")
2025	Michael Clifford	Single	Co-writer, co-producer ("cool")
2025	Knox	Going, Going, Gone	Co-writer, co-producer ("The DJ", "Voicemail")
2024	jxdn	WHEN THE MUSIC STOPS	Co-writer, co-producer ("LOST ANGEL", "CANDLES", "STRAY", "SAD OCTOBER", "WHAT THE HELL", "IT MUST SUCK TO KNOW YOU", "SH!T", "BACCARAT", "WHAT CAN I SAY", "STRANGER", "WRECK ME", "YOU NEEDED SOMEONE I JUST HAPPENED TO BE THERE", "WET DREAM (IT'S YOU)", "DRUGS")
2024	Nicky Youre	Single	Co-writer, co-producer ("Mile Away")
2024	Bring Me The Horizon	POST HUMAN: NeX GEn	Co-writer ("DArkSide", "liMOusIne (feat. AURORA", "a bulleT w/ my namE On (feat. Underoath")
2024	Your Broken Hero	The End?	Co-writer, producer (Full Album)
2024	Sueco	Attempted Lover	Co-writer ("Somebody Else")
2024	elijah woods	Single	Co-writer, co-producer ("2 thousand 10")
2024	elijah woods	Elijah Would!	Co-writer, co-producer ("What It Means")
2024	Blink-182	ONE MORE TIME... PART - 2	Co-writer, co-producer ("EVERY OTHER WEEKEND”, “CAN'T GO BACK”)
2024	Leah Kate	Single	Co-writer, producer ("Nasty")
2024	Leah Kate	Single	Co-producer ("What Girls Do")
2024	Amira Elfeky	Single	Co-writer, co-producer ("Will You Love Me When I'm Dead")
2023	Mansionz	mansionz 2	Co-writer, co-producer ("Optionz" "Annihilate / Third Eye" "Boys Don't Cry"
2023	Mansionz	mansionz 2	Co-Producer ("FYSU" "Ride Die Eat Sleep Fuck Kill" "Bloodbath" "Stay Alive" My Invincible Smile")
2023	Blink-182	ONE MORE TIME...	Co-writer, co-producer ("ONE MORE TIME" "CUT ME OFF" "SEE YOU")
2023	Addison Rae	AR	Co-writer, producer ("2 Die 4 ft. Charli XCX")
2023	The Maine	The Maine	Co-Writer ("dose no. 2" “blame" “the mood I’m in/jsyk" “I think about you all the time")
2023	Elley Duhè	Single	Co-writer, producer ("Delirium")
2023	The Band Camino	The Dark	Co-writer, co-producer ("See You Later" “Let It Happen" “It’s You (It’s You)" “3 Month Hangover" “Last Man In The World")
2023	LANY	Single	Co-writer ("XXL")
2023	Dream	Single	Co-writer, producer ("Until I End Up Dead")
2023	Jxdn	Single	Co-writer, co-producer ("Friends With Benefits")
2023	Pardyalone	Single	Co-producer ("Alone feat. Travis Barker")
2023	All Time Low	Tell Me I'm Alive	Co-writer, co-producer ("Sleepwalking", "Tell Me I'm Alive", "Calm Down", "The Way You Miss Me", "Sound Of Letting Go")
2023	Girlfriends	Single	Co-writer, producer ("Over My Dead Body")
2023	Waterparks	Intellectual Property	Co-writer ("Self-Sabotage", "RITUAL")
2023	Salem Ilese	Single	Co-writer, producer ("PainHub")
2023	BoyWithUke	Single	Producer ("Out Of Reach")
2023	Avery Anna	Single	Co-writer, co-producer ("Self Love")
2023	Illenium	ILLENIUM	Co-writer, co-producer ("Nothing Ever After feat. Motionless in White", "Lifeline feat. jxdn", "Back To You feat. All Time Low")
2023	Leah Kate	Single	Co-producer ("Space")
2023	Leah Kate	Single	Co-writer, co-producer ("Super Over")
2023	Leah Kate	Single	Co-writer, co-producer ("Happy")
2023	Bring Me the Horizon	Single	Co-writer ("DArkSide")
2023	Jaden Hossler	Single	Co-writer, co-producer ("Chrome Hearted")
2023	BoyWithUke	Lucid Dreams	Co-Producer ("Problematic")
2022	blackbear	In Loving Memory	Co-writer, co-producer (Full Album)
2022	Kane Brown	Different Man	Producer ("Grand")
2022	Machine Gun Kelly	mainstream sellout (life in pink deluxe)	Co-writer ("9 lives")
2022	Pale Waves	Unwanted	Co-writer ("Unwanted", "Without You", "Only Problem", "You're So Vain", "So Sick (Of Missing You)")
2022	Reneé Rapp	Single	Co-writer, co-producer ("Tattoos")
2022	Blackbear and Machine Gun Kelly	Single	Co-writer, producer ("GFY")
2022	Illenium	Single	Co-writer ("Shivering" ft. Spiritbox)
2022	bbno$	Single	Co-writer, co-producer ("Piccolo")
2022	Sueco	It Was Fun While It Lasted	Co-writer, co-producer ("It's Going Good!", "Drunk Dial", "Last Thing I Do")
2021	Papa Roach	Ego Trip	Co-writer, co-producer ("Kill The Noise")
2021	Glaive	old dog, new tricks	Co-writer ("walking around with no hands")
2021	Lil Huddy	Teenage Heartbreak	Co-writer, co-producer ("How It Ends", "Headlock", "Lost Without You", "No More (Interlude)", "Teenage Heartbreak", "Partycrasher", "The Eulogy of You & Me", "America's Sweetheart")
2021	The Band Camino	The Band CAMINO	Co-writer ("Underneath My Skin")
2021	LANY	gg bb xx	Co-writer, co-producer ("Never Mind, Let's Break Up", "Roll Over, Baby", "Dancing In The Kitchen", "Ex I Never Had", "Til I Don't"); co-producer ("Up To Me", "Get Away", "DNA", "Live It Down", "Somewhere", "Care Less", "One Minute Left To Live")
2021	Blackbear	Misery Lake	Co-writer, co-producer ("U Love U" with Tate McRae, "@ My Worst", "Alone In A Room Full Of People", "Ghost Town" ft. Sasha Alex Sloan, "IMU" ft. Travis Barker, "Bad Day")
2021	Bryce Vine	Single	Co-writer, producer ("Miss You a Little" ft. Lovelytheband)
2021	All Time Low	Single	Co-writer ("PMA" ft. Pale Waves)
2021	Hey Violet	Single	Co-writer ("Party Girl")
2021	The Maine	XOXO: From Love and Anxiety in Real Time	Co-writer, co-producer ("Sticky", "High Forever")
2021	Parmalee	For You	Co-writer, co-producer ("Greatest Hits" ft. Fitz)
2021	Kane Brown and Blackbear	Single	Co-writer, co-producer ("Memory")
2021	Jxdn	Tell Me About Tomorrow	Co-writer, co-producer ("No Vanity", "Better Off Dead"); co-writer ("Think About Me", "A Wasted Year", "One Minute", "Braindead", "Angels and Demons Pt. 2", "Last Time", "Tell Me About Tomorrow")
2021	Jordan McGraw	Single	Co-writer, producer ("SHE")
2021	Maroon 5	Jordi	Co-writer, co-producer ("Beautiful Mistakes" ft. Megan Thee Stallion, "Lovesick")
2021	Daya	The Difference EP	Co-writer, producer ("Bad Girl", "The Difference")
2021	The Hunna	Single	Co-writer ("Bad Place")
2021	Parmalee and Blanco Brown	Single	Co-producer ("Just The Way" ft. Bryce Vine)
2021	All Time Low	Single	Co-writer, co-producer ("Once In A Lifetime")
2021	Trippie Redd	Neon Shark vs Pegasus	Co-writer ("PILL BREAKER" ft. Travis Barker, Machine Gun Kelly & Blackbear)
2021	Ashnikko	Demidevil	Co-producer ("L8r Boi", "Deal With It" ft. Kelis)
2021	Tate McRae	Too Young to Be Sad	Co-writer, co-producer ("rubberband")
2021	Guccihighwaters	Joke's On You	Co-writer, co-producer ("Rock Bottom" ft. Nothing. Nowhere)
2020	Kane Brown and John Legend	Single	Co-writer, producer ("Last Time I Say Sorry")
2020	All Time Low	Wake Up, Sunshine	Co-writer, co-producer ("Monsters" ft. Blackbear ); co-writer ("Glitter & Crimson", "Summer Daze")
2020	Waterparks	Greatest Hits	Co-writer ("Lowkey As Hell")
2020	Blackbear	Everything Means Nothing	Co-writer, co-producer ("hot girl bummer", "me & ur ghost", "queen of broken hearts", "i feel bad", "i feel 2 much", "sobbing in cabo", "clown" ft. Trevor Daniel, "half alive", "if i were u" ft. Lauv, "why are girls?", "smile again")
2020	Katy Perry	Smile	Co-writer, co-producer ("Not The End of the World", "Teary Eyes")
2020	I Dont Know How but They Found Me	Razzmatazz	Co-writer ("Need You Here")
2020	Your Broken Hero	Single	Co-writer ("A Letter To Ashley")
2020	Blackbear	Single	Co-writer, co-producer, Mixer ("Cheers" ft. Wiz Khalifa)
2020	Dixie D'Amelio	Single	Co-writer, co-producer, Mixer ("One Whole Day" ft. Wiz Khalifa)
2019	Blackbear	Anonymous	Co-writer, co-producer ("SWEAR TO GOD", "Down")
2019	Loote	Lost	Co-writer, co-producer ("She's All Yours")
2019	One Ok Rock	Eye of the Storm	Co-writer, co-producer ("Unforgettable")
2019	Oliver Tree	Do You Feel Me?	Co-writer, producer (Introspective)
2019	Hoodie Allen	Whatever USA	Co-writer, co-producer (Hell of a Time)
2019	FRND	Adventures of the FRNDship: Issue One	Writer, producer ("What If I Fall Apart", "Graveyard", "Famous Last Words")
2019	Illenium	Ascend	Co-writer, co-producer ("Hold On"(featuring Georgia Ku))
2019	Blackbear	Single	Writer, Co-producer ("Hot Girl Bummer")
2019	Yungblud	Single	Co-writer ("Die A Little")
2019	The Band CAMINO	tryhard	Co-writer ("Hush Hush", "Haunted")
2019	Wage War	Pressure	Co-writer ("Grave", "Forget My Name")
2019	Ayokay	Single	Co-writer, co-producer ("Sleeping Next To You")
2019	Dwilly ft. FRND & JELEEL!	Single	Co-writer ("Assassin")
2019	Simple Plan and State Champs ft. We the Kings	Single	Co-writer ("Where I Belong")
2019	Jordan McGraw	Jordan McGraw	Co-writer, co-producer ("We Should Still Be Friends")
2019	Breathe Carolina	DEADTHEALBUM	Co-writer ("July")
2018	Quinn XCII ft. Kailee Morgue	Single	Co-writer, producer ("What The Hell Happened To Us?")
2018	5 Seconds of Summer	Youngblood	Co-writer, co-producer ("Want You Back", "Ghost Of You", "Babylon")
2018	MKTO	Single	Co-producer ("How Can I Forget")
2018	Against The Current	Single	Co-writer, producer ("Almost Forgot")
2018	Against The Current	Single	Co-writer, producer ("Strangers Again")
2018	Against The Current	Past Lives	Co-writer, producer ("I Like The Way", "Voices", "Friendly Reminder", "P.A.T.T.")
2018	Lauv	Single	Co-writer, producer ("Bracelet")
2018	Gabby Barrett	Single	Co-writer, co-producer ("Rivers Deep")
2018	FRND	Single	Writer, producer ("Erase")
2018	FRND	Single	Writer, producer ("Before U I Didn't Exist")
2018	FRND	Single	Writer, producer ("100 Faces")
2018	Blackbear	Single	Co-writer, producer ("The 1")
2017	Olivia Holt	Olivia EP	Co-writer, co-producer ("History")
2017	Linkin Park	One More Light	Co-producer ("Sorry for Now")
2017	Blackbear	Do Re Mi	Co-writer, producer
2017	Kumi Koda	W FACE	Co-writer, producer
2017	FRND	Single	Writer, producer ("Friend")
2017	FRND	Single	Writer, producer ("Sticks and Stones")
2017	FRND	Single	Writer, producer ("Substitute")
2017	FRND	Single	Writer, producer ("Be Happy")
2017	FRND	In Your Dreams EP	Writer, producer
2017	All Time Low	Last Young Renegade	Co-producer, co-writer ("Good Times", "Drugs & Candy", "Nightmares")
2017	Hoodie Allen	The Hype	Co-writer ("Ain't Ready")
2017	Brooke Candy	TBA	Co-writer, producer ("Nuts")
2017	Blackbear	Cybersex	Co-writer, producer ("Anxiety" ft. FRND)
2017	Said the Sky	Single	Co-writer, co-producer ("Faded" ft. FRND)
2017	Louis The Child	Single	Co-writer ("Last To Leave")
2016	Annabel Jones	Libelle EP	Co-producer, co-writer ("IOU", "Happy", "Money, Love, Success.", "Not Today", "Magnetic")
2016	Hoodie Allen	Happy Camper	Co-writer ("Surprise Party")
2016	MKTO	Single	Co-writer, co-producer ("Hands Off My Heart")
2016	MKTO	Single	Co-writer, co-producer ("Superstitious")
2016	Against The Current	In Our Bones	Co-writer, co-producer ("Wasteland")
2016	Fifth Harmony	7/27	Co-writer, co-producer ("Big Bad Wolf")
2016	Krewella	Ammunition EP	Co-writer, co-producer ("Ammunition", "Marching On")
2016	Lindsey Stirling	Brave Enough	Co-writer, producer ("Hold My Heart feat. ZZ Ward")
2016	Britney Spears	Glory	Co-producer, co-writer ("Love Me Down")
2016	Tritonal	Painting with Dreams	Co-writer ("Livin' The Dream", "Feel The Love")
2016	The Score	Unstoppable EP	Co-writer ("Where You Are")
2016	Set It Off	Upside Down	Co-writer ("Crutch")
2016	Annabel Jones & Nebbra	Single	Co-writer ("Stay")
2016	One Ok Rock	Single	Producer, co-writer ("Bedroom Warfare")
2015	All Time Low	Future Hearts	Co-writer ("Something's Gotta Give")
2015	MKTO	Bad Girls EP	Co-producer, co-writer ("Bad Girls", "Afraid of the Dark", "Monaco", "Just Imagine It")
2014	Robert DeLong	In the Cards EP	Co-producer, co-writer ("Long Way Down", "Isabel Street", "Acid Rain", "Feels Like")
2014	Andrew McMahon	Andrew McMahon in the Wilderness	Co-writer ("All Our Lives")
2014	Breathe Carolina	Savages	Co-producer, co-writer ("Collide", "I Don't Know What I'm Doing")
2014	Madison Beer	Single	Co-producer, co-writer ("Unbreakable")
2014	MKTO	MKTO	Co-writer, co-producer ("Thank You", "Classic", "God Only Knows", "American Dream", "Could Be Me", "Nowhere", "Forever Until Tomorrow", "Wasted", "Heartbreak Holiday", "No More Second Chances", "Goodbye Song")
2013	Celine Dion	Loved Me Back to Life	Co-producer ("Save Your Soul")
2013	Celine Dion and Ne-Yo	Loved Me Back to Life	Co-producer, co-writer ("Incredible")
2013	R5	Louder	Co-producer, co-writer ("Pass Me By", "(I Can't) Forget About You", "Ain't No Way We're Going Home", "I Want U Bad", "If I Can't Be With You", "Love Me Like That", "One Last Dance", "Loud", "Fallin' For You", "Cali Girls", "Here Comes Forever")
2013	Cody Simpson	Surfers Paradise	Co-producer ("Summertime Of Our Lives")
2013	Demi Lovato	Demi	Co-producer, co-writer ("Something That We're Not", "Warrior", "I Hate You, Don't Leave Me", "Let It Go")
2013	Hot Chelle Rae	Recklessly	Producer, co-writer ("Hung Up")
2013	Simple Plan	Single	Co-producer ("Summer Paradise" feat. MKTO)
2012	Ne-Yo	R.E.D.	Co-producer, co-writer ("Shut Me Down")
2012	The Ready Set	The Bad & The Better	Producer, co-writer ("Give Me Your Hand")
2012	Outasight	Nights Like These	Producer, co-writer ("Now Or Never")
2012	Bridgit Mendler	Hello My Name Is...	Co-producer, co-writer ("Ready or Not", "Forgot to Laugh", "Top of the World", "Hurricane", "All I See Is Gold", "The Fall Song", "Love Will Tell Us Where To Go", "Rocks At My Window", "5:15")
2011	Hot Chelle Rae	Whatever	Co-producer, co-writer ("I Like It Like That", "Keep You With Me", "Radio", "Whatever", "Forever Unstoppable", "Why Don't You Love Me?", "Downtown Girl", "Beautiful Freaks", "The Only One")
