= Idwk (song) =

2018 song by Dvbbs

Single by Dvbbs and Blackbear
- Released: June 1, 2018
- Genre: Bass
- Length: 2:59
- Label: Ultra Records
- Songwriters: Alex van den Hoef; Chris van den Hoef; Benjamin Samama; Derik Baker; Kate Alexandra Morgan; Matthew Tyler Musto; Michael Wise
- Producers: Alex van den Hoef; Chris van den Hoef

Dvbbs singles chronology
"I Love It" (2018)	"Idwk" (2018)	"Listen Closely" (2018)

Blackbear singles chronology
"Up in This" (2017)	"Idwk" (2018)	"The 1" (2018)

Music video
- "Idwk" on YouTube

"Idwk" (abbreviation for "I Don't Wanna Know", stylized as IDWK) is a song released by Canadian electronic music duo Dvbbs and American musician Blackbear. It was released as a single on June 1, 2018. It reached number 67 in Canada.

== Music video ==
The music video was published on July 10, 2018, directed by Zac Facts.

== Charts ==
=== Weekly charts ===
Chart (2018)	Peak position
Canada Hot 100 (Billboard)	67
Canada CHR/Top 40 (Billboard)	22
US Hot Dance/Electronic Songs (Billboard)	12

=== Year-end charts ===
Chart (2018)	Position
US Hot Dance/Electronic Songs (Billboard)	69

== Certifications ==
Region	Certification	Certified units/sales
Canada (Music Canada)	Platinum	80,000^{‡}
^{‡} Sales+streaming figures based on certification alone.
