= Drink Bleach =

EP by Blackbear
- Released: June 17, 2016
- Genre: Alternative R&B; synth pop
- Length: 15:40
- Label: Beartrap
- Producer: Blackbear; The Lab; Mad Cat; Ladkani

Blackbear chronology
Help (2015)	Drink Bleach (2016)	Cashmere Noose (2016)

Singles from Drink Bleach
- 1. "Girls Like U" Released: April 20, 2016

Drink Bleach (stylized in all lowercase) is the fourth EP by American singer Blackbear. It was released on April 20, 2016 exclusively on SoundCloud through his independent record label Beartrap, but released to other streaming services on June 17, 2016. It features appearances from Mike Posner and P-Lo. Only one single, "Girls Like U", was released on April 20, 2016, and a music video for the song was released on September 22, 2016.

== Track listing ==
Drink Bleach track listing
No.	Title	Writer(s)	Producer(s)	Length
1.	"Girls Like U"	Matthew Musto; Christian Ariza	Blackbear; Rad Cat	3:00
2.	"Obvious" (featuring Mike Posner)	Musto; Ariza; Posner	Blackbear; Rad Cat	3:26
3.	"Something Real"	Musto	Blackbear; The Lab	2:50
4.	"Shake Ya Ass" (featuring P-Lo)	Musto; Paolo Rodriguez	Ladkani	3:21
5.	"Suckerz"	Musto	Blackbear; The Lab	3:03
Total length:				15:40

- All song titles are stylized in lowercase letters.
