= PopSockets =

Consumer electronics accessory company

PopSockets LLC
- Type: Private
- Founded: 2012
- Founder: David Barnett
- Headquarters: Boulder, Colorado, U.S.
- Area served: Worldwide
- Products: Mobile phone accessories
- Website: www.popsockets.com

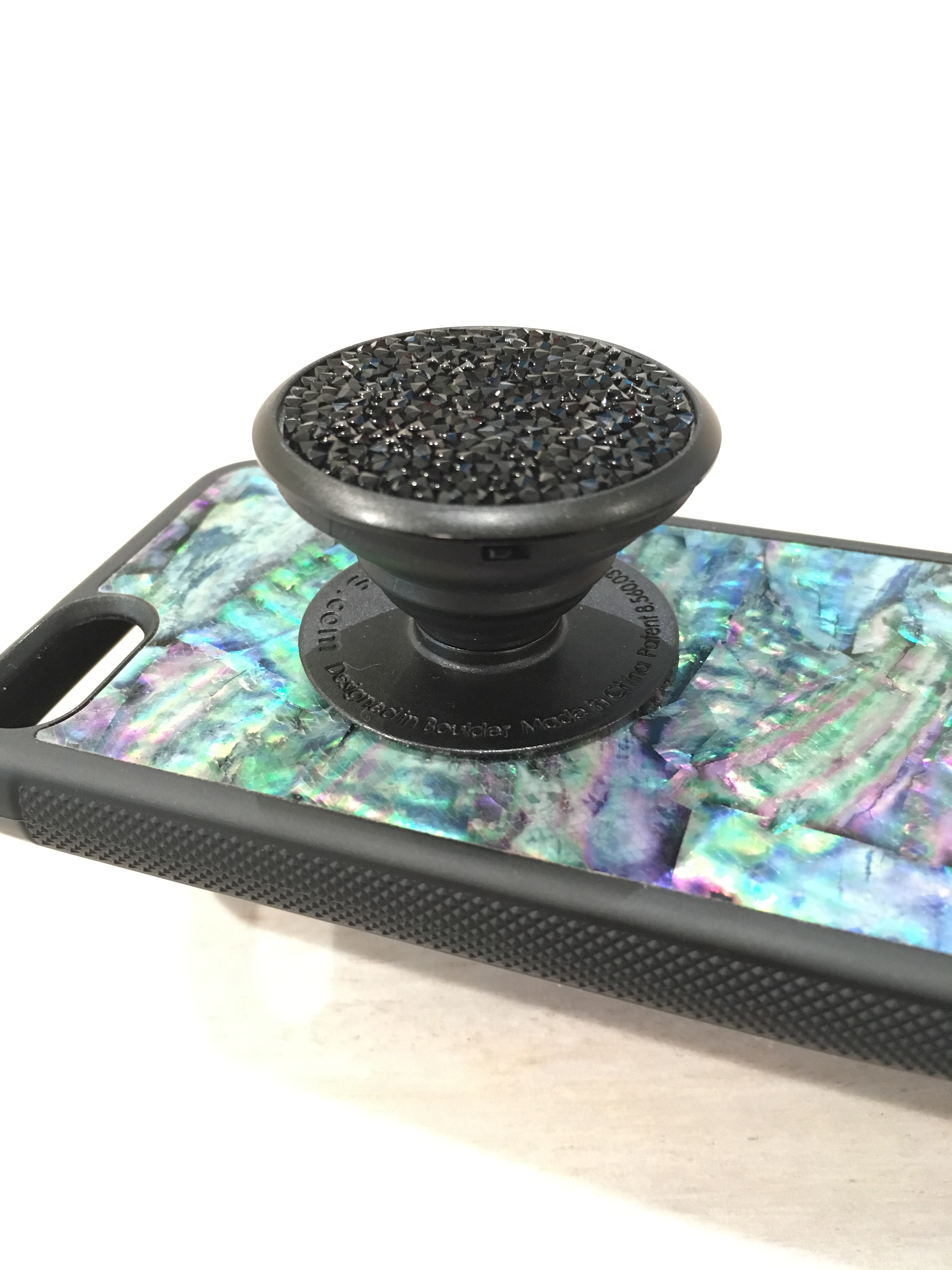
A premium PopSockets grip with black Swarovski crystals adhered to a phone case.

PopSockets LLC is a privately owned consumer electronics accessory company that produces removable grips for smartphones. The company was founded in 2012 by David Barnett, who was at the time a philosophy professor.

== Overview ==
In 2014, the first year of sales, PopSockets LLC sold 30,000 PopSockets Grips. In 2017, they sold 35 million. In 2018, they sold 60 million. They have sold a total of over 100 million Popsockets Grips.

In 2018, PopSockets LLC's revenue was over US$200 million, with a profit of over US$90 million.

In August 2018, PopSockets LLC was listed as #2 on the Inc. 5000 list of the fastest-growing companies in America.

PopSockets LLC employs over 200 people, in Boulder, CO; San Francisco, CA; Finland, and Singapore. PopSockets LLC has partnerships with production facilities in China, South Korea, Mexico, and Seattle.

== History ==
In January 2012, Barnett started a Kickstarter campaign for an iPhone 4 case with a device on the back that could be used to store earbuds. In March 2012, Barnett signed an exclusive licensing agreement with Case-Mate, but the agreement later fell through. Because of the resulting delay, Barnett announced in September 2012 that he would be developing an iPhone 5 case instead of an iPhone 4 case. He also announced that he would be developing a product that, at the time, was called "PopSockets for All"—this is a PopSockets Grip that sticks to one's phone or tablet via a repositionable sticky gel pad. He was interested in finding a way to store his headphones without them getting tangled. This individual PopSockets Grip has been the company's best-selling product.

PopSockets LLC started selling products in January 2014, via direct sales on its website. In 2015, PopSockets LLC signed its first major retail deal, with T-Mobile. PopSockets reached a high level of popularity in 2017, becoming what Slate Magazine called a well-known "love it or hate it" gadget, like the fidget spinner.

PopSockets LLC's revenue grew by 71,424 percent from mid-2015 to mid-2018; this growth was achieved without venture capital investment.

In March 2019, PopSockets LLC moved its headquarters to a 46,000-square-foot building in Boulder, Colorado.

== Early controversy ==
PopSockets Grip was featured on a September 2012 segment of NPR's radio show All Things Considered, entitled "When A Kickstarter Campaign Fails, Does Anyone Get The Money Back?". The segment discussed how Barnett refunded 40 of his 500 Kickstarter backers, due to the delays in production. Regarding the refunds, Barnett was quoted as saying "I think it sets a bad precedent...Once I did that, I could tell that it started creating the impression in some of my backers that they had purchased an item. And I think as Kickstarter grows, there's more and more of an impression that it's just a big store for people to go get deals." Barnett's production delays were also discussed on CNN.

== Products ==
The main product sold by PopSockets LLC is the PopSockets Grip. The PopSockets Grip is designed to allow easier handling of the phone. The PopSockets Grip also functions as a stand, to prop a phone up while watching video. PopSockets LLC also sells the PopSockets Mount, which enables one to temporarily mount one's phone on a vertical surface, such as a car dashboard or wall. In February 2018, the company started selling the PopSockets Vent Mount, which clips onto the air vent of a vehicle.

PopSockets LLC also sells PopMinis (miniature PopSockets Grips, sold in sets of three), PopWallets (designed to hold up to three credit cards or driver's licenses) and PopMirrors (phone grips with two mirrors).

In October 2018, the company started selling swappable PopSockets Grips, called "PopGrips", where the top portion of the grip, called a "PopTop", can be removed and replaced with another PopTop.

Starting in Spring 2019, in conjunction with Otterbox, PopSockets LLC began selling the Otter+Pop phone case, an OtterBox case with an integrated PopTop. This case won a USA Today CES Editors' Choice award.

PopSockets LLC has plans in the future to sell swappable grips with integrated external batteries, sensors, and trackers. PopSockets LLC announced plans for making products compatible with the iPhone 12 MagSafe feature.

== Intellectual property protection ==
PopSockets LLC has faced significant problems with counterfeits (fakes branded as "PopSockets") and knock-offs (which don't use the term "PopSockets", but copy the design of PopSockets Grip and hence violate patents). In 2017 and 2018, PopSockets LLC's brand protection team was working with online marketplaces around the world to remove 1,000 to 2,000 listings daily. Amazon had to develop new protocols to deal with the volume of fake PopSockets Grip on the Amazon Marketplace.

In 2018, PopSockets LLC spent over US$7 million on intellectual property protection, working with over 40 lawyers worldwide.

In June 2018, PopSockets LLC won a General Exclusion Order (GEO) from the US International Trade Commission, prohibiting the importation into America of products that infringe on PopSockets's 2013 patent entitled "Extending Socket for Portable Media Player".

== Amazon dispute ==
In November 2018, PopSockets LLC stopped selling PopSockets Grips on amazon.com, due to pricing disputes with Amazon. Amazon changed its policy, so that brands like PopSockets could not sell directly on the Amazon Marketplace, but could only sell items to Amazon at wholesale cost; Amazon would then be the seller and determine the retail cost. PopSockets LLC wanted to maintain pricing parity with other retailers (like Target and Best Buy) who sell PopSockets Grips, and as a result PopSockets LLC decided not to sell PopSockets Grips to Amazon at all.

== Philanthropy ==
In November 2018, PopSockets LLC launched a major philanthropic program called "Poptivism", where for each PopSockets Grip sold through the Poptivism platform, 50% of the sale is donated to the non-profit assigned to it by its creator. One of the celebrities who has promoted a Poptivism Grip is the American actress and singer Zendaya; sales from her grip support the charity FoodCorps. PopSockets LLC also partnered with Teen Vogue to support the gun violence charity March for Our Lives.

PopSockets LLC was a "Let's Get a Grip on Arthritis" sponsor, and donated 10 percent of its online net proceeds from January through March 2018 to the Arthritis Foundation. PopSockets LLC received recognition from the Arthritis Foundation for the utility of PopSockets grips for people with arthritis.

For April through June 2018, PopSockets LLC donated 10 percent of its online net proceeds to Craig Hospital (which helps patients with spinal cord injury and traumatic brain injury rehabilitation).

For July through September 2018, PopSockets LLC donated 10 percent of its online net proceeds to The ALS Association. PopSockets inventor David Barnett's grandfather helped found that group.

According to PopSocket's website as of April 25, 2020, the company has raised a total of $934,447 through the Poptivism program.
