= Wake Up, Sunshine =

Studio album by All Time Low
- Released: April 3, 2020
- Recorded: 2019–20
- Genre: Pop-punk
- Length: 46:14
- Label: Fueled by Ramen
- Producers: Zakk Cervini; All Time Low; Andrew Goldstein

All Time Low chronology
Last Young Renegade (2017)	Wake Up, Sunshine (2020)	Tell Me I'm Alive (2023)

Singles from Wake Up, Sunshine
- 1. "Some Kind of Disaster" Released: January 21, 2020; 2. "Sleeping In" Released: February 20, 2020; 3. "Getaway Green" Released: March 17, 2020; 4. "Monsters" Released: April 3, 2020

Wake Up, Sunshine is the eighth studio album by American rock band All Time Low. It was released on April 3, 2020, and is their second release with Fueled by Ramen following Last Young Renegade in 2017. The album's fourth and final single "Monsters" is the highest-charting song of the band’s career.

== Background and recording ==
The album comes after 2017's Last Young Renegade. In January 2019, the band began creating the record in drummer Rian Dawson's home studio in Nashville, Tennessee with Zakk Cervini and Andrew Goldstein. A majority of the writing and recording process took place in August 2019 at a mansion located in Palm Desert, California, (usually referred to by the band as the "marble mansion") that the band rented and lived in for a few months along with most of the team that worked on Wake Up, Sunshine. To finish the album, All Time Low members Alex Gaskarth and Jack Barakat rented a cabin with Cervini and Goldstein in Big Bear Lake, California.

== Composition ==
The album's overall sound has been described as pop-punk by critics.

== Reception ==
Professional ratings
Review scores
Source	Rating
Kerrang!	4/5
The Alternative	Phenomenal
Wall of Sound	9.5/10
AllMusic	3.5/5

The album received positive reviews from critics, with some noting it as a nostalgic culmination of the band's previous works. In a positive review, Emily Carter of Kerrang! called it "dreamy", "nostalgic", and "sentimental". AllMusic reviewer Neil Z. Yeung praised the album for paying homage to pop punk predecessors such as Yellowcard, Fall Out Boy, Lit, and Blink-182, while praising the album's blend of the band's modern style and their past pop-punk music, mentioning the presence of "catchy hooks, bright energy, and . . . the style that won All Time Low a legion of devoted scene fans."

== Track listing ==
Standard Edition
No.	Title	Writer(s)	Length
1.	"Some Kind of Disaster"	Alex Gaskarth; Phil Gornell; Zakk Cervini	3:44
2.	"Sleeping In"	Gaskarth; Bonnie McKee; Lukasz Gottwald; Mathieu Jomphe; Max Martin; Cervini	3:01
3.	"Getaway Green"	Gaskarth; Gornell; Cervini	2:47
4.	"Melancholy Kaleidoscope"	Gaskarth; Gornell; Cervini	2:55
5.	"Trouble Is"	Gaskarth; Cervini	2:27
6.	"Wake Up, Sunshine"	Gaskarth; Colin Brittain	3:16
7.	"Monsters" (featuring Blackbear)	Gaskarth; Andrew Goldstein; Jack Barakat; Kevin Fisher; Matthew Musto	2:54
8.	"Pretty Venom (Interlude)"	Gaskarth; Fisher; Cervini	3:03
9.	"Favorite Place" (featuring The Band Camino)	Gaskarth; Gornell; Cervini	3:14
10.	"Safe"	Gaskarth; Gornell; Cervini	3:40
11.	"January Gloom (Seasons, Pt. 1)"	Gaskarth; Gornell; Cervini	2:47
12.	"Clumsy"	Gaskarth; Andreas Carlsson; Martin; Gornell; Rami Yacoub; Cervini	3:02
13.	"Glitter & Crimson"	Gaskarth; Goldstein; Barakat; Cervini	3:03
14.	"Summer Daze (Seasons, Pt. 2)"	Gaskarth; Goldstein; Barakat; Cervini	3:15
15.	"Basement Noise"	Gaskarth; Chris Greatti; Barakat; Cervini	3:06
Total length:			46:14

Japanese Bonus Track
No.	Title	Writer(s)	Length
16.	"I Hate That for You"	Gaskarth	2:57
Total length:			49:11

== Personnel ==
All Time Low

- Alex Gaskarth – lead vocals, guitars
- Jack Barakat – guitars, backing vocals
- Zack Merrick – bass, backing vocals
- Rian Dawson – drums, percussion

Additional musicians

- Blackbear – vocal on track 7
- The Band CAMINO – vocals on track 9
- Dan Swank – guitars, keyboards, programming, percussion

Technical

- Zakk Cervini – producer, engineering, mixing (tracks 3, 4, 6, 8–11, 13, 15)
- Andrew Goldstein – co-producer
- Phil Gornell – co-producer, engineering
- Dan Swank – co-producer, engineering
- Neal Avron – mixing (tracks 1, 2, 5, 7, 12, 14)
- Andrew Cook – artwork
- Ashley Osborn – photography
- Ted Jensen – mastering
- Nik Trekov – editing

== Charts ==
Chart performance for Wake Up, Sunshine
Chart (2020)	Peak position
Australian Albums (ARIA)	12
Canadian Albums (Billboard)	92
German Albums (Offizielle Top 100)	49
Scottish Albums (Official Charts)	2
UK Albums (Official Charts)	3
US Billboard 200	31
US Top Alternative Albums (Billboard)	2
US Top Rock Albums (Billboard)	1
