= Monsters (All Time Low song) =

- Cover of the Demi Lovato remix version

Single by All Time Low featuring Blackbear

from the album Wake Up, Sunshine
- Released: April 3, 2020 (original version); December 4, 2020 (Demi Lovato version)
- Genre: Pop-punk; alternative pop; electronic rock; rap rock
- Length: 2:54
- Label: Fueled by Ramen
- Songwriters: Andrew Goldstein; Alex Gaskarth; Demi Lovato; Jack Barakat; Kevin Fisher; Matthew Musto
- Producers: FRND; Zakk Cervini

All Time Low singles chronology
"Getaway Green" (2020)	"Monsters" (2020)	"Once in a Lifetime" (2021)

Demi Lovato singles chronology
"Commander in Chief" (2020)	"Monsters" (2020)	"What Other People Say" (2021)

Blackbear singles chronology
"Worry About Me" (2020)	"Monsters" (2020)	"Go Dumb" (2020)

Lyric video
- "Monsters" on YouTube

"Monsters" is a song by American rock band All Time Low featuring Blackbear. The song was written by FRND, Kevin Fisher, Jack Barakat, Alex Gaskarth, Blackbear and Demi Lovato, and produced by Zakk Cervini and Gaskarth. The song was originally released on April 3, 2020, by Fueled by Ramen, as part of the band's eighth studio album Wake Up, Sunshine. Following 11 weeks at number one on Billboard's Alternative Airplay chart, the song was re-released with vocals by Demi Lovato on December 4, 2020. It debuted on the Billboard Hot 100 at number 88 and peaked at number 55.

== Background ==
All Time Low, Lovato, and Blackbear teased the collaboration on social media prior to release, all sharing similar artwork, which led fans to believe a collaboration was underway. The next day, the band confirmed the collaboration, specifically that Lovato would be featuring on a re-release of "Monsters", to be released that night.

Speaking to People, Gaskarth said Lovato was recruited for a re-release of the track because she had been a "friend for over ten years" and "genuinely has one of the best voices in modern music and always sounds authentic and incredible singing any genre, particularly when she's leaning into rock or punk." Meanwhile, Lovato shared on Twitter that she was "stoked" to be on a song with both All Time Low and Blackbear.

Former Neck Deep bassist-turned-DJ Fil Thorpe-Evans, commonly known as Prblm Child, created an electronic remix of the song. It was released as "Monsters: Prblm Child Remix." A distorted version of the chorus behind loud bass drops is heard after the main chorus.

== Composition ==
The song’s overall sound has been described as pop-punk, alternative pop, electronic rock, and rap rock by critics, while also being compared to Fall Out Boy. The song is in the key of C minor.

== Chart performance ==
The song is All Time Low's first number one on the Billboard Alternative Airplay chart, reaching the summit in September 2020 and remaining there for 18 weeks. As of January 2022, the song holds the record for the longest continuous run on the respective chart with 88 weeks. "Monsters" is the band's highest-charting song of their career on the Billboard Hot 100, peaking at number 55, as well as their highest peak on pop radio.

In late 2023, "Monsters" was ranked by Billboard as the biggest hit in the history of the Alternative Airplay chart.

== Lyric videos ==
Lyric videos were released for the song, with cartoon illustrations of the All Time Low band members and Blackbear running away from monstrous figures. After the release of the Demi Lovato version, a new lyric video was uploaded, where an animation representing Lovato is included in the lyric video as well, coordinated with when she sings her verses of the song. Lovato's character is also seen singing on stage backed by the band comprising monsters.

== Track listing ==
Digital download and streaming

1. "Monsters" – 2:54
2. "Monsters" (Demi Lovato remix) – 2:54

== Personnel ==
Credits adapted from Tidal.

All Time Low

- Alex Gaskarth – lead vocals
- Jack Barakat – guitars, backing vocals
- Zack Merrick – bass, backing vocals
- Rian Dawson – drums, percussion

Additional musicians

- Blackbear – vocals
- Demi Lovato – vocals

Technical

- Zakk Cervini – producer, engineering, additional production
- Andrew Goldstein – producer, additional production
- Mitch Allan – vocal production (Demi Lovato re-release)
- Demi Lovato – vocal production (Demi Lovato re-release)
- Alex Ghenea – mixing (Demi Lovato re-release)
- Neal Avron – mixing (album version)
- Andrew Cook – artwork
- Chris Gehringer – mastering (Demi Lovato re-release)
- Ted Jensen – mastering (album version)

== Charts ==
=== Weekly charts ===
Weekly chart performance for "Monsters"
Chart (2020–2022)	Peak position
Australia Digital Tracks (ARIA)	49
Canada CHR/Top 40 (Billboard)	37
Canada Rock (Billboard)	33
Czech Republic (Radio Top 100)	2
Czech Republic (Modern Rock)	1
Hungary (Single Top 40)	27
UK Singles Downloads (OCC)	97
US Billboard Hot 100	55
US Adult Pop Airplay (Billboard)	15
US Hot Rock & Alternative Songs (Billboard)	6
US Pop Airplay (Billboard)	18
US Alternative Airplay (Billboard)	1
US Rock & Alternative Airplay (Billboard)	1

=== Year-end charts ===
Year-end chart performance for "Monsters"
Chart (2020)	Position
US Hot Rock & Alternative Songs (Billboard)	29
US Alternative Airplay Songs (Billboard)	9
US Rock Airplay (Billboard)	15

Chart (2021)	Position
US Hot Rock & Alternative Songs (Billboard)	13
US Alternative Airplay Songs (Billboard)	1
US Rock Airplay (Billboard)	3

Chart (2022)	Position
US Alternative Airplay Songs (Billboard)	42

== Certifications ==
Certifications for "Monsters"
Region	Certification	Certified units/sales
Australia (ARIA)	Platinum	70,000^{‡}
Austria (IFPI Austria)	Gold	15,000^{‡}
Canada (Music Canada)	2× Platinum	160,000^{‡}
New Zealand (RMNZ)	Gold	15,000^{‡}
United Kingdom (BPI)	Silver	200,000^{‡}
United States (RIAA)	Gold	500,000^{‡}
^{‡} Sales+streaming figures based on certification alone.
