= Queen of Broken Hearts =

2020 song by Blackbear

Single by Blackbear

from the album Everything Means Nothing
- Released: July 10, 2020
- Genre: Pop
- Length: 2:51
- Label: Beartrap; Alamo; Interscope
- Songwriter(s): Matthew Musto; Andrew Goldstein
- Producer(s): Blackbear; Goldstein

Blackbear singles chronology
| "Tinted Eyes" (2020) | "Queen of Broken Hearts" (2020) | "My Ex's Best Friend" (2020) |

Music video
- "Queen of Broken Hearts" on YouTube

"Queen of Broken Hearts" (stylized in all lowercase) is a song by American singer Blackbear. It was released through Beartrap, Alamo, and Interscope Records on July 10, 2020 as the third single from his fifth studio album Everything Means Nothing.

== Background and composition ==
"Queen of Broken Hearts" was written and produced by Blackbear and Andrew Goldstein. The song was first teased in Instagram stories in August and September 2019. It is based around the toxicity of social media and how it affects a person's mental health, it being the "queen of broken hearts." Blackbear further described the background of the song in Apple Music's description of Everything Means Nothing:

I think social media breaks hearts in a way. We put so much emphasis on where our profiles are and where we’re sitting and what our friends are doing and a fear of missing out. And I just feel like my heart gets broken every day. When I see a friend of mine in Cabo, I’m like, "Well, we’re taking quarantine seriously. I want to be in Cabo right now." And my heart’s broken. Every day I check my phone and I go on Instagram before I even text back my mom, and it’s just like, "Damn, where’s my heart actually?"

— Blackbear

== Music video ==
The music video for "Queen of Broken Hearts" premiered on July 11, 2020 and was directed by Blackbear himself. The video stars actress and singer Mckenna Grace destroying a bedroom alongside music memorabilia, ending with a dead battery symbol.

== Personnel ==
Credits for "Queen of Broken Hearts" adapted from Apple Music.

Musicians
- Matthew Musto – lead vocals, guitar, keyboards, programming
- Andrew Goldstein – backing vocals, guitar, keyboards, programming
Production
- Blackbear – production
- Goldstein – production
- Alex Ghenea – mixing

== Charts ==
Chart performance for "Queen of Broken Hearts"
| Chart (2020) | Peak position |
|---|---|
| New Zealand Hot Singles (RMNZ) | 15 |
| US Bubbling Under Hot 100 (Billboard) | 22 |

== Certifications ==
Certifications for "Queen of Broken Hearts"
| Region | Certification | Certified units/sales |
|---|---|---|
| United States (RIAA) | Gold | 500,000^{‡} |
| Canada (Music Canada) | Gold | 40,000^{‡} |
^{‡} Sales+streaming figures based on certification alone.
