= Do Re Mi (Blackbear song) =

- Cover of the version featuring Gucci Mane

Single by Blackbear featuring Gucci Mane

from the album Digital Druglord
- Released: March 17, 2017 (original) July 28, 2017 (with Gucci Mane)
- Recorded: 2016 (original); 2017 (with Gucci Mane)
- Length: 3:32; 3:53 (featuring Gucci Mane)
- Label: Beartrap; Alamo; Interscope
- Songwriters: Matthew Musto; Andrew Goldstein; Radric Delantic Davis (featuring Gucci Mane)
- Producers: Blackbear; Goldstein

blackbear singles chronology
"Wanderlust" (2016)	"Do Re Mi" (2017)	"Talk Is Overrated" (2017)

Gucci Mane singles chronology
"Lit" (2017)	"Do Re Mi (Remix)" (2017)	"That's What I Like" (2017)

Music video
- "do re mi" on YouTube

"Do Re Mi" (stylized in all lowercase) is a song written and performed by American hip-hop musician and singer-songwriter Blackbear. The original version was released on March 17, 2017, as the lead single from his third studio album, Digital Druglord (2017). The original version peaked at number 40 on the Billboard Hot 100. A remix featuring Gucci Mane was released on July 28, 2017.

== Charts ==
=== Weekly charts ===
Chart (2017)	Peak position
Canada Hot 100 (Billboard)	62
Czech Republic Singles Digital (ČNS IFPI)	66
Slovakia Singles Digital (ČNS IFPI)	55
Sweden Heatseeker (Sverigetopplistan)	12
US Billboard Hot 100	40
US Hot R&B/Hip-Hop Songs (Billboard)	12
US Pop Airplay (Billboard)	26
US Rhythmic Airplay (Billboard)	3

==== Remix featuring Gucci Mane ====
Chart (2017)	Peak position
Australia Urban (ARIA)	28
Belgium Urban (Ultratop Flanders)	37
New Zealand Heatseekers (RMNZ)	8
UK Singles (Official Charts)	94

=== Year-end charts ===
Chart (2017)	Position
US Billboard Hot 100	98
US Hot R&B/Hip-Hop Songs (Billboard)	44
US Rhythmic (Billboard)	37

== Certifications ==
Region	Certification	Certified units/sales
Brazil (Pro-Música Brasil)	Platinum	60,000^{‡}
Canada (Music Canada)	4× Platinum	320,000^{‡}
Germany (BVMI)	Gold	200,000^{‡}
New Zealand (RMNZ)	Platinum	30,000^{‡}
Poland (ZPAV)	Gold	25,000^{‡}
United Kingdom (BPI)	Gold	400,000^{‡}
United States (RIAA)	6× Platinum	6,000,000^{‡}
^{‡} Sales+streaming figures based on certification alone.

== Release history ==
Region	Date	Format	Label	Ref.
United States	March 17, 2017	Digital download	Beartrap	
United States	July 28, 2017	Digital download (featuring Gucci Mane)	Beartrap; Alamo; Interscope	
United States	August 22, 2017	Contemporary hit radio	Interscope	
