= Me & Ur Ghost =

2020 song by Blackbear

Single by Blackbear

from the album Everything Means Nothing
- Released: January 16, 2020
- Length: 3:21
- Label: Beartrap; Alamo; Interscope
- Songwriters: Matthew Musto; Andrew Goldstein
- Producers: Blackbear; Goldstein

Blackbear singles chronology
"Beach Ballin'" (2019)	"Me & Ur Ghost" (2020)	"No Service In the Hills" (2020)

Music video
- "Me & Ur Ghost" on YouTube

"Me & Ur Ghost" (stylized in all lowercase) is a song by American singer Blackbear. It was released through Beartrap, Alamo, and Interscope Records on January 16, 2020 as the second single from his fifth studio album Everything Means Nothing.

== Background and composition ==
"Me & Ur Ghost" was written and produced by Blackbear and Andrew Goldstein. The song was first teased in Instagram stories in September 2019. The song describes having constant reminders of a past lover. Blackbear described the background of the song in Apple Music's description of Everything Means Nothing:

I feel like it’s basically a song about the loss of someone and you’re kind stuck there with memories...It’s like a sense of nostalgia...and that is kind of just in the rearview. The kind of feeling you get when you pass an ex-girlfriend’s make and model of car, and you think it’s them and you just get butterflies in your stomach. You don’t want to particularly see them or even say sorry, or talk to them or anything like that. But you just kind of get this weird nostalgic feeling.

— Blackbear

== Music video ==
The music video for "Me & Ur Ghost" premiered on January 16, 2020 and was directed by Isaac Rentz. The video features Blackbear performing in a bar with the ghost of a woman haunting his vision and memories.

== Personnel ==
Credits for "Me & Ur Ghost" adapted from Apple Music.

Musicians
- Matthew Musto – lead vocals, guitar, keyboards, programming
- Andrew Goldstein – backing vocals, guitar, keyboards, programming
Production
- Blackbear – production
- Goldstein – production
- Alex Ghenea – mixing

== Charts ==
Chart performance for "Me & Ur Ghost"
Chart (2020)	Peak position
Ireland (IRMA)	67
New Zealand Hot Singles (RMNZ)	31
US Bubbling Under Hot 100 (Billboard)	14

== Certifications ==
Certifications for "Me & Ur Ghost"
Region	Certification	Certified units/sales
Brazil (Pro-Música Brasil)	Gold	20,000^{‡}
Canada (Music Canada)	Platinum	80,000^{‡}
New Zealand (RMNZ)	Gold	15,000^{‡}
United States (RIAA)	Gold	500,000^{‡}
^{‡} Sales+streaming figures based on certification alone.
