= Mansionz =

American hip hop duo

- Origin: Los Angeles, California, U.S.
- Genres: Alternative hip-hop; R&B; electropop
- Years active: 2016–present
- Label: Island
- Members: Mike Posner; Matthew Musto

Mansionz (stylized in lowercase) is an American alternative hip hop duo composed of musicians Mike Posner and blackbear. They released their self-titled debut album on March 24, 2017.

== History ==
Mansionz was formed by longtime collaborators Matthew Musto and Mike Posner in late 2016. The two had previously worked together on writing songs such as Big Time Rush's 2011 single "Windows Down" and Justin Bieber's 2012 single "Boyfriend". On December 9, 2016, Musto and Posner released their debut single under the recording outfit Mansionz: "Stfu", featuring rapper Spark Master Tape.

To promote the release of their collaborative album, Mansionz released two YouTube videos, "intro to mansionz part 1" and "intro to mansionz part 2," on January 16, 2017, and January 25, 2017, respectively. Both videos were shot by Spark Master Tape. In addition, Mansionz released two additional singles: "Rich White Girls" and "Dennis Rodman," which were released on February 3, 2017 and March 17, 2017, respectively. Musto and Posner promoted the album on the red carpet of the 59th Annual Grammy Awards, where they both sported lime-green hair, a signature look and major aspect of their album's promotion.

Mansionz, the self-titled debut album from the duo, was released on March 24, 2017, and featured appearances from Soren Bryce, G-Eazy, CyHi The Prynce, and Snoozegod, as well as Spark Master Tape and Dennis Rodman. It received generally positive reviews from critics, although some reviewers who had enjoyed the earlier solo work of Musto and Posner were disappointed.

On March 29, 2017, Mansionz released an official music video for their single "Rich White Girls", starring Amanda Crew and Meredith Hagner as the title characters. It was followed by a music video for "Dennis Rodman," which arrived on May 19, 2017. In June 2017, Posner made a surprise appearance at a Blackbear concert in Detroit on the latter's Digital DrugTour, making it the first official Mansionz concert. The duo performed several songs, including "Dennis Rodman" and "STFU," and teased further collaborative releases on Twitter. On August 11, 2017, "Wicked" was announced to be the fourth single from Mansionz. A radio edit of "Wicked" was released, as well as remixes of the track by Loote and Rat City. On October 19, 2018, the duo performed three songs officially as Mansionz at Red Rocks Amphitheater in Colorado. They performed "My Beloved," "Dennis Rodman," and "STFU." There, the duo teased second album.

The duo's second album, Mansionz 2, was released on October 31, 2023.

== Members ==
- Mike Posner – vocals, production
- blackbear – vocals, production

== Discography ==
=== Studio albums ===
Title and details
Notes
Mansionz
- Type: Album
- Released: March 24, 2017
- Label: Island

| No. | Title | Length |
|---|---|---|
| 1. | "Snoozefest" | 1:10 |
| 2. | "My Beloved" | 3:53 |
| 3. | "Stfu" (feat. Spark Master Tape) | 3:50 |
| 4. | "Dennis Rodman" (feat. Dennis Rodman) | 3:10 |
| 5. | "I'm Thinking About Horses" | 6:23 |
| 6. | "Nobody Knows" | 5:41 |
| 7. | "A Million Miles" | 5:03 |
| 8. | "Wicked" (feat. G-Eazy) | 3:35 |
| 9. | "Rich White Girls" | 3:29 |
| 10. | "Strip Club" | 3:33 |
| 11. | "White Linen" (feat. Cyhi the Prynce) | 4:32 |
| 12. | "Gorgeous" | 2:28 |
| 13. | "The Life of a Troubadour" (feat. Snoozegod as Oliver) | 4:42 |

Mansionz 2
- Type: Album
- Released: October 31, 2023
- Label: Island

| No. | Title | Length |
|---|---|---|
| 1. | "The Green Spangled Banner" | 2:00 |
| 2. | "Optionz" | 3:14 |
| 3. | "Annihilate/Third Eye" | 3:45 |
| 4. | "FYSU" | 3:46 |
| 5. | "Boys Don't Cry" | 3:12 |
| 6. | "High Again" | 2:24 |
| 7. | "Bloodbath" | 1:48 |
| 8. | "Ride Die Eat Sleep Fuck Kill" | 5:22 |
| 9. | "Mansionz Ranch" | 1:00 |
| 10. | "Mt. Everest" | 1:54 |
| 11. | "Stay Alive" | 3:42 |
| 12. | "Journey of One/omw" | 3:26 |
| 13. | "My Invincible Smile" | 3:10 |
| 14. | "(silence)" | 0:38 |
| 15. | "Cum ruined food for me. i tasted it & im hooked. sorry mom." | 1:06 |

=== Singles ===
- "Stfu" (feat. Spark Master Tape) (2016)
- "Rich White Girls" (2017)
- "Dennis Rodman" (feat. Dennis Rodman) (2017)
- "Wicked" (feat. G-Eazy) (2017)
