= Everything Means Nothing =

Studio album by Blackbear
- Released: August 21, 2020
- Recorded: 2019–20
- Genres: Synth-pop; hip-hop; R&B
- Length: 37:09
- Labels: Beartrap; Alamo; Interscope
- Producers: Blackbear; Andrew Goldstein; Jordan Reyes; Aaron Harmon; Marshmello

Blackbear chronology
Anonymous (2019)	Everything Means Nothing (2020)	Misery Lake (2021)

Singles from Everything Means Nothing
- 1. "Hot Girl Bummer" Released: August 23, 2019; 2. "Me & Ur Ghost" Released: January 16, 2020; 3. "Queen of Broken Hearts" Released: July 10, 2020

Professional ratings
Review scores
Source	Rating
AllMusic	3.5/5 stars
Pitchfork	4.1/10

Everything Means Nothing (stylized in all lowercase) is the fifth studio album by American singer-songwriter and producer Blackbear. It was released on August 21, 2020, through Beartrap, Alamo Records, and Interscope Records and follows his previous studio album Anonymous (2019).

== Background and composition ==
Blackbear described the background of the album in an interview with Paper:

The previous album titles are odes to the internet, but this one in particular is an ode to my real life. Because the album has so much to do with the internet, with the age of social media, I wanted to title it after something real in my life. I realized the real, good things in my life, the real hit records, are my son and my family who loves me, and my team around me that works hard every day. Those are the real things in my life, everything else means nothing. And it's obviously a breakup album, so everything that once was means nothing now, so it's kind of an emo title as well.

— Blackbear

== Singles ==
The album was preceded by three singles: "Hot Girl Bummer", "Me & Ur Ghost", and "Queen of Broken Hearts". Those singles were included on the first half of the album released on July 17, 2020 alongside the promotional singles "I Feel Bad", "I Feel 2 Much", and "I Felt That". "If I Were U" with Lauv was also released as the final promotional single on August 19.

== Track listing ==
All tracks written by Matthew Musto and Andrew Goldstein and produced by Goldstein, except where noted.

Everything Means Nothing track listing
No.	Title	Writer(s)	Producer(s)	Length
1.	"Hot Girl Bummer"	Alex Ayvar	Andrew Goldstein; Blackbear	3:08
2.	"Me & Ur Ghost"	Damon Kapuscinsky	Goldstein; Blackbear	3:21
3.	"Queen of Broken Hearts"			2:51
4.	"I Feel Bad"	Musto; Goldstein; Joseph Kirkland; Jordan Reyes; Aaron Harmon; Stephan Jenkins		2:55
5.	"I Feel 2 Much"	Musto; Goldstein; Tim Henson		4:00
6.	"I Felt That"	Musto; Goldstein; Harmon; Reyes	Harmon; Reyes	3:22
7.	"Sobbing in Cabo"			3:07
8.	"Clown" (with Trevor Daniel)	Musto; Goldstein; Trevor Daniel		2:28
9.	"Half Alive"		Goldstein; Marshmello	3:15
10.	"If I Were U" (with Lauv)	Musto; Goldstein; Ari Leff		3:06
11.	"Why Are Girls?"			3:07
12.	"Smile Again"	Musto; Goldstein; Kirkland	Goldstein; Kirkland	2:29
Total length:				37:09

- All song titles are stylized in lowercase letters.

== Charts ==
Chart performance for Everything Means Nothing
Chart (2020)	Peak position
Australian Albums (ARIA)	82
Belgian Albums (Ultratop Flanders)	185
Canadian Albums (Billboard)	19
Finnish Albums (Suomen virallinen lista)	44
Irish Albums (IRMA)	78
New Zealand Albums (RMNZ)	37
Norwegian Albums (VG-lista)	23
Scottish Albums (Official Charts)	64
UK Albums (Official Charts)	56
US Billboard 200	15

== Certifications ==
Certifications for Everything Means Nothing
Region	Certification	Certified units/sales
New Zealand (RMNZ)	Gold	7,500^{‡}
United States (RIAA)	Gold	500,000^{‡}
^{‡} Sales+streaming figures based on certification alone.
