= Help (Blackbear album) =

Studio album by Blackbear
- Released: November 27, 2015
- Genre: Alternative R&B
- Length: 31:02
- Label: Beartrap
- Producer: Blackbear; J.Hill; Jerry Good; Mod Sun; Kizzo; Corporal

Blackbear chronology
Dead (2015)	Help (2015)	Drink Bleach (2016)

Singles from Help
- 1. "Different Hos" Released: October 25, 2015; 2. "Paragraphs" Released: November 16, 2015; 3. "Oh Lord" Released: November 20, 2015; 4. "Slide Thru" Released: January 15, 2016

Help (stylized in all lowercase) is the second studio album by American singer Blackbear. It was released on November 27, 2015 through his independent record label Beartrap following his debut album Deadroses (2015) and the acoustic EP Dead (2015). The album includes guest appearances from Jerry Good and Maejor. Four singles were released in promotion of the album: "Different Hos", "Paragraphs", "Oh Lord", and "Slide Thru" featuring Jerry Good. The album peaked at No. 34 on the Billboard Top R&B/Hip-Hop Albums chart.

== Background and composition ==
Help describes Blackbear's addiction to prescription drugs and wish for escapism. The album cover features a picture of him at the SoHo House West Hollywood and was designed by frequent collaborator Mod Sun.

== Singles ==
"Different Hos" was released as the lead single from Help on October 25, 2015 on SoundCloud with "Paragraphs" and "Oh Lord" following on November 16 and 20 respectively. "Hustler" was released alongside "Paragraphs" but was removed after a few hours. "Slide Thru" was released as a single alongside a music video on January 15, 2016.

== Track listing ==
Help track listing
No.	Title	Writer(s)	Producer(s)	Length
1.	"Don't Stop"	Matthew Musto	J.Hill	2:50
2.	"Oh Lord"	Musto	Blackbear	3:20
3.	"Slide Thru" (featuring Jerry Good)	Musto; Good; Hill; Tane Runo	Good; J.Hill	3:05
4.	"Paragraphs"	Musto; Wilson; Conley	J.Hill	2:49
5.	"Nervous"	Musto; Derek Smith	Blackbear; Mod Sun	2:33
6.	"Where Was U?"	Musto; Tearce Kizzo	Blackbear; Kizzo	3:32
7.	"Help" (featuring Maejor)	Musto; Brandon Green; Jesse Wilson	Corporal	3:33
8.	"Different Hos"	Musto; Smith	Mod Sun	2:14
9.	"Verbatim"	Musto; Kizzo	Kizzo	3:36
10.	"Hustler"	Musto; Wilson	Corporal	3:30
Total length:				31:02

- All song titles are stylized in lowercase letters.

== Charts ==
Chart (2015)	Peak position
US Top R&B/Hip-Hop Albums (Billboard)	34
US Heatseekers Albums (Billboard)	5
US Independent Albums (Billboard)	24
