= Blackbear (musician) =

American musician (born 1990)

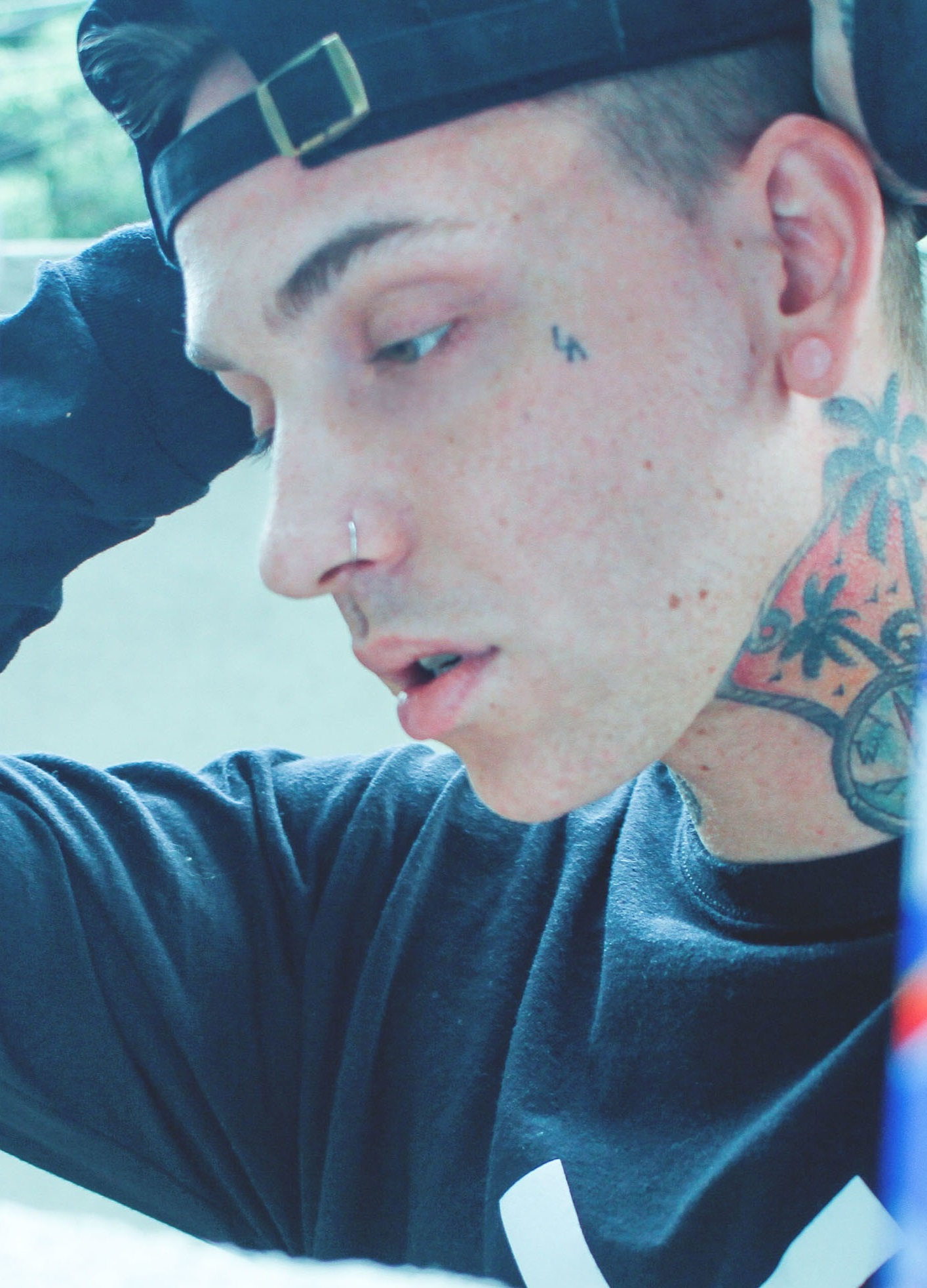
- Blackbear in 2016

Background information
- Born: Matthew Tyler Musto; November 27, 1990 (age 35); Daytona Beach, Florida, U.S.
- Origin: Palm Coast, Florida, U.S.
- Genres: Pop; emo; R&B; hip-hop
- Occupations: Musician; singer; rapper; songwriter; record producer
- Instrument: Vocals
- Years active: 2006–present
- Labels: Columbia; Alamo; Beartrap; Interscope
- Member of: Mansionz
- Children: 2
- Relatives: August Maturo (ex brother-in-law)
- Website: beartrap.la
- Spouse: Michele Maturo (m. 2022; sep. 2024)

Matthew Tyler Musto (born November 27, 1990), known professionally as Blackbear (stylized in all lowercase), is an American musician, singer, rapper, songwriter, and record producer. He has released six studio albums, six EPs, one mixtape and two collaborative albums. Musto is also a member of the alternative hip-hop duo Mansionz with singer Mike Posner.

== Early life ==
Musto was born in Daytona Beach, Florida, and moved to Palm Coast as a child. His father is of Italian descent. He has stated that many of his family members are from Pittston, Pennsylvania. In fourth grade, he became interested in music through Rancid, Blink-182, and bands his babysitter introduced him to, such as New Found Glory and Alkaline Trio.

== Career ==
=== 2006–2014: Early career ===
In high school, Musto was the singer of Florida-based rock band Polaroid. They released one album, Paint The Town; one EP, Inside And Out; and one demo, The Cure Demo and have been variously described as being a pop-punk, punk rock, and garage band. During Musto's freshman year of high school, the band signed to Leakmob Records. Musto dropped out of school in the 10th grade to focus on music. As Polaroid progressed, their music became increasingly influenced by emo. By 2008, Musto had also begun to write his own solo music.

After leaving Polaroid, Musto began a solo career when he moved to Atlanta to work with Ne-Yo. He put out his first EP entitled Brightness in 2008, followed by Contrast in 2009, and Exposure in 2010. He put out the Christmas song "I Hate the Holidays" with Tyler Carter, then-member of the band Woe, Is Me in late-2010, shortly followed by a new single, "Douche Bag" in early-January 2011. In mid-2011, Musto released both the Gone for Good EP and the Year of the Blackbear EP. In fall 2011, Musto decided to use his nickname Blackbear as his pseudonym when making music. The first song to be released with the Blackbear moniker is Mike Posner's "Marauder Music" in November 2011.

Musto co-wrote Justin Bieber's "Boyfriend", a number 2 hit on the Billboard Hot 100 in early 2012. Intent on pursuing a career as an R&B singer, Musto released his debut EP Foreplay on April 20, 2012, and his debut mixtape Sex on October 31, 2012. Both releases were under the name Blackbear, and Sex featured collaborations from fellow "Boyfriend" co-writer Mike Posner, along with producers, singers, and songwriters James Blake and Maejor Ali. He also appeared on Machine Gun Kelly's "End of the Road" from the Lace Up album, released October 9, 2012.

On August 23, 2013, Blackbear released his debut solo single, "Nyla". On April 20, 2014, Blackbear released The Afterglow EP, which landed him number four on Billboard's Uncharted listing of releases from upcoming artists.

In 2014, Blackbear became one of the first independent artists to monetize streaming on SoundCloud.

=== 2015: Deadroses and Help ===
Blackbear released his first full-length album, Deadroses, a self-released set of 10 tracks, on February 14, 2015. The album received favorable reviews, one of which stating that the album had "pleasantly mixed together a plethora of genres, sounds, and emotions to create a completely cohesive and unique project." The lead single, "Idfc", charted on Billboard's R&B Hot 100 and held a spot on the Billboard R&B charts for over a year. "Idfc" shot Blackbear to the top 20 of the Billboard charts. Two other singles, "4U" and "Dirty Laundry", were released, as well as the title track being released as a promotional single.

In May 2015, his track "Nyla" was featured in the documentary Hot Girls Wanted on Netflix.

Deadroses was followed by the EP Dead, which featured acoustic versions of four Deadroses tracks, as well as one new track, "Weak When Ur Around".

He released his second full-length album, Help, on November 27, 2015.

=== 2016: Drink Bleach, Cashmere Noose, and Mansionz ===
On April 20, 2016, Blackbear released his fourth EP, Drink Bleach, which featured appearances from "Boyfriend" collaborator Mike Posner as well as American hip-hop recording artist and The HBK Gang co-founder P-Lo.

Throughout the year, Blackbear collaborated with other artists such as American rock band Linkin Park as well as Jacob Sartorius and Phoebe Ryan. He also toured with Hoodie Allen, whose 2016 track and Happy Camper promotional single "Champagne and Pools" also featured Blackbear. Mid-year, he joined Super Duper Kyle and Tinashe on their tours.

On August 2, 2016, Blackbear released his fifth EP, titled Cashmere Noose, through SoundCloud. He handled the EP's production entirely on his own through his production collective Beartrap Records. The original version of Cashmere Noose can still be found on Blackbear's SoundCloud page. The deluxe version of Cashmere Noose peaked at number one on the iTunes R&B charts and number six overall on iTunes, just behind Beyoncé's Lemonade and Drake's Views.

Blackbear was also featured in Olivia O'Brien's single "Root Beer Float", released September 15, 2016. He also released the track "If I Could I Would Feel Nothing", a freestyle originally posted on his Twitter that eventually became a promotional single for his upcoming third studio album.

In late 2016, Blackbear formed the alternative hip-hop duo Mansionz with frequent collaborator and singer-songwriter Mike Posner. Mansionz has been active since 2016 and is based out of Los Angeles, California. The duo released their debut single, "STFU", on December 9, 2016. The song features rapper Spark Master Tape. Mansionz released two more singles in early 2017, "Rich White Girls" and "Dennis Rodman", the latter of which features the basketball player Dennis Rodman. Both of these singles, along with "STFU", were featured on Mansionz' self-titled debut album which was released on March 24, 2017, and features guest appearances from G-Eazy, Soren Bryce, CyHi the Prynce, and Snoozegod.

=== 2017–2018: Digital Druglord and Cybersex ===
On January 29, 2017, he posted the track "Make Daddy Proud", which was a remix of Jeremy Zucker's "Heavy", on his SoundCloud page. The track was later confirmed to be the next promotional single for his third studio album Digital Druglord. On March 17, 2017, Blackbear released the lead single for the album, titled "Do Re Mi".

On April 2, 2017, shortly before the release of Digital Druglord, Blackbear released a short acoustic EP titled Salt on his SoundCloud. Digital Druglord was released on April 20, 2017, featuring the single "Do Re Mi" along with promotional singles "If I Could I Would Feel Nothing" and "Make Daddy Proud". In an interview with Vice's music channel Noisey, he revealed that he wrote Digital Druglord while in the hospital based on his experiences with alcohol and drugs. He states that the cover art for the album, a woman with pill bottles attached to her chest, is not to glorify the use of pharmaceuticals, but because he now has to take prescription drugs to stay alive due to his illness.

On June 22, 2017, he signed a 10 million dollar distribution deal with Interscope that gave the label the rights to Digital Druglord and the following studio album and their respective singles.

On August 18, 2017, Blackbear announced his next project, the mixtape Cybersex. The name Cybersex comes from Blackbear's infatuation with the internet. In an interview with Pigeons & Planes, he talks about how the internet is why he is here and how cybersex was the first form of sexting. He states how he finds the internet interesting and how you can now fall asleep with your loved one in another country, due to technology. He released a song on SoundCloud in September 2017 titled "Froze Over". The track was written and produced by Good Intent and Blackbear and it would later appear in Cybersex as a two part interlude titled "Thursday/Froze Over". On October 6, 2017, a song titled "Playboy Shit", which features rapper Lil Aaron, was released on Blackbear's PornHub account and confirmed to be a part of the project. On October 20, 2017, Blackbear released the single "Bright Pink Tims" featuring Cam'ron. This day also marked the first day of his tour in support of Fall Out Boy's Mania Tour, running until November 18. On November 27, 2017, Musto's 27th birthday, Cybersex was released.

On April 26, 2018, Blackbear was featured on Mike Shinoda's song "About You" from his album Post Traumatic, dealing with the death of fellow Linkin Park bandmate Chester Bennington.

On August 23, 2018, Blackbear released his single titled "The 1", originally intended to be the lead single of his fourth studio album.

=== 2019–2021: Anonymous, Everything Means Nothing, and Misery Lake ===
In February 2019, Blackbear said he would be releasing a single per week until April 26, which is when his fourth studio album would be released. Five singles were released before the album's release: "1 Sided Love" on February 14, "High1x" on March 1, "Swear to God" on March 13, "Hate My Guts" on March 29, and "Dead to Me" on April 12. The latter three were included in a medley music video released on June 19.

April 26, 2019, Blackbear released the full album, Anonymous., his longest album yet, containing 18 tracks lasting a total of 51 minutes. Along with the release of this album, he posted a photo on Instagram with a caption discussing his gratefulness of a second chance after his health complications at age 27, and he discusses how meaningful this album is to him.

On August 23, 2019, he released the single "Hot Girl Bummer". It was inspired by his diagnosis of necrotizing pancreatitis. The mention of drug and alcohol abuse over a short period of time alludes to his addiction during his diagnosis. The song reached No. 11 on the Billboard Hot 100 and was certified 6× platinum by the Recording Industry Association of America (RIAA). The song would end up as the lead single of his fifth studio album fifth studio album Everything Means Nothing.

On November 13, 2019, he released the one-off single "Tongue Tied", with American producer Marshmello and English singer Yungblud.

On January 16, 2020, he released the album's second single "Me & Ur Ghost".

On March 13, 2020, Ellie Goulding's single "Worry About Me" featuring Blackbear was released from her album Brightest Blue. This was followed up on April 3, when he was also featured on the All Time Low song "Monsters" from their album Wake Up, Sunshine.

On July 5, 2020, Blackbear tweeted the release date of the coming album, stating it would be a "2 part LP", with the first part releasing July 17, and the second part releasing August 21. Following this, on July 10, he released the album's third single, "Queen of Broken Hearts". The first half of the album consists of three new singles and the three already released, with new songs "I Feel Bad", "I Feel 2 Much", and "I Felt That". The tracklist for the second half of Everything Means Nothing was also released, with songs "Sobbing In Cabo", "Clown" with Trevor Daniel, "Half Alive", "If I Were U" with Lauv, "Why Are Girls", and "Smile Again".

On August 7, 2020, Blackbear was featured on Machine Gun Kelly's single "My Ex's Best Friend" from his albumTickets to My Downfall. Following that on October 16 was G-Eazy's single "Hate the Way" from the deluxe edition of These Things Happen Too on which he was also featured. On December 25, Blackbear released the song "Cheers" with American rapper Wiz Khalifa.

On March 12, 2021, Blackbear was featured on Mod Sun's single, "Heavy". On May 21, Blackbear released the single "Jealousy" alongside Mansionz partner Mike Posner, the first track in 4 years following the duo's self-titled debut album.

On June 4, 2021, Blackbear released the song "U Love U" with Canadian singer-songwriter Tate McRae, as the lead single from his seventh extended play, Misery Lake. On July 14, Blackbear announced its tracklist alongside a tweet that the EP would be delayed to August 13 as a result of Sony Music Entertainment acquiring Alamo Records. Under Sony, he was assigned to its flagship label Columbia Records. Sony Music also distributes his previous releases for Alamo, from the period when it was distributed by Interscope.

On July 9, 2021, Blackbear released the song "Memory" alongside American country singer Kane Brown.

On August 6 2021, Blackbear released the song "@ My Worst" as the second single from Misery Lake, followed by the EP's release on August 13.

On November 4, 2021, ASCAP announced Blackbear's signing to a song administration deal. He was previously affiliated with Broadcast Music, Inc. (BMI), which still controls his shareholdings to previous works.

=== 2022–present: In Loving Memory, Mansionz 2, and Analogue Dream ===
On March 18, 2022, Blackbear featured in a BoyWithUke song, "IDGAF", off his album Serotonin Dreams.

On May 27, 2022, Blackbear released the song "GFY" with Machine Gun Kelly as the lead single from his sixth studio album In Loving Memory. On July 8, the second single from the album titled "The Idea" was released. On July 16, Blackbear announced the tracklist and official release date for the album along with the pre-order. On August 5, 2022, Blackbear released the only promotional single from the album titled "Toxic Energy", featuring The Used.

On August 26, 2022, Blackbear's sixth studio album, In Loving Memory, was released. The album switches Blackbear's pop rap style to pop-punk. The album features appearances from pop-punk bands the Used, New Found Glory, and Bayside and production from Blink-182 drummer Travis Barker.

On October 31, 2023, Blackbear and Mansionz partner Mike Posner released their long awaited follow-up album, Mansionz 2. It was released with no singles and little promotion.

== Production and songwriting ==
In addition to his own music, Musto has produced and written for many popular artists. He has collaborated with numerous musical artists such as Justin Bieber, Boywithuke, G-Eazy, Mike Posner, All Time Low, Nick Jonas, Machine Gun Kelly, Ellie Goulding, Cam'ron, Gucci Mane, 2 Chainz, Mod Sun, Rivers Cuomo, Linkin Park, Billie Eilish, Pharrell Williams, Miley Cyrus, Mike Shinoda, Charlie Puth, Tiny Meat Gang, and Maroon 5. He co-wrote "Boyfriend" by Justin Bieber, alongside Mike Posner, which debuted at number two on the Billboard Hot 100. He also produced the title track from G-Eazy's album These Things Happen, as well as featuring on the album.

== Personal life ==
In April 2016, Musto was hospitalized and diagnosed with chronic pancreatitis. During his time in the hospital, he wrote his album Digital Druglord and took this time to become sober. In August 2018, he joined forces with Mission: Cure, a non-profit dedicated to finding a cure for chronic pancreatitis. He was a recipient of the "Courage Award" for his inspiration to others living with pancreatitis and gave a speech at their gala event.

In November 2018, Musto collaborated with the brand PopSockets and donated 50% of the proceeds of his branded products to Mission: Cure.

In 2017, Musto was in a relationship with actress Bella Thorne. On September 25, 2019, Musto announced that he and his girlfriend Michele Maturo were expecting their first child in January 2020. On January 29, 2020, the couple announced the birth of their son born on January 26, 2020. On April 11, 2021, the couple announced their engagement via Maturo's Instagram page. On February 22, 2022, they married and on March 12, 2022, the couple had their second son. In October 2024, Musto announced that he and Maturo had separated.

In February 2025, Musto came out as bisexual via Reddit.

== Discography ==
Studio albums

- Deadroses (2015)
- Help (2015)
- Digital Druglord (2017)
- Anonymous (2019)
- Everything Means Nothing (2020)
- In Loving Memory (2022)
- Analogue Dream (2026)

== Awards and nominations ==
Award	Year	Nomination	Work	Result	Ref.
Billboard Music Awards	2021	Top Rock Song	"Monsters"	Nominated	
Billboard Music Awards	2021	Top Rock Song	"My Ex's Best Friend"	Nominated	
iHeartRadio Music Awards	2018	Best Remix	"do re mi (feat. Gucci Mane)"	Nominated	
iHeartRadio Music Awards	2021	Best New Pop Artist	Himself	Nominated	
iHeartRadio Music Awards	2022	Alternative Song of the Year	"My Ex's Best Friend"	Nominated	
iHeartRadio Music Awards	2022	Alternative Song of the Year	"Monsters"	Won	
iHeartRadio Titanium Awards	2020	1 Billion Total Audience Spins on iHeartRadio Stations	"Hot Girl Bummer"	Won	
MTV Europe Music Awards	2020	Best Alternative	"me & ur ghost"	Nominated	
MTV Video Music Awards	2021	Best Alternative	"My Ex's Best Friend"	Won	

== Filmography ==
Year	Title	Role	Notes
2021	Downfalls High	Himself	
