= Tate McRae discography =

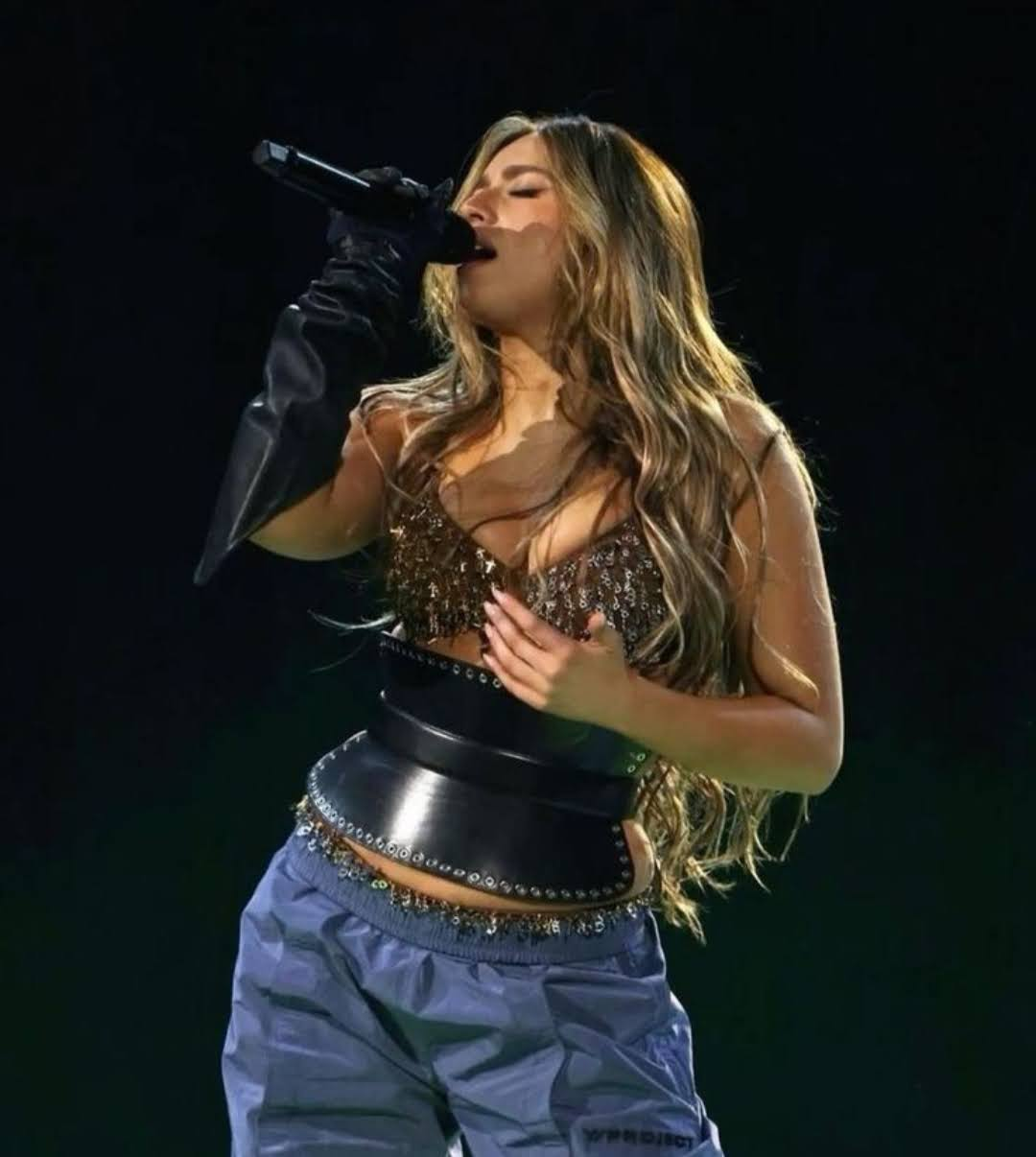
- McRae performing at the Brit Awards 2024
- Studio albums: 3
- EPs: 2
- Compilation albums: 1
- Singles: 39

Canadian singer Tate McRae has released three studio albums, one compilation album, two extended plays and 39 singles (including three as a featured artist). After gaining recognition as a dancer, McRae began posting original songs and covers on her YouTube channel. In 2017, she found viral success with her debut single—"One Day"—which was later certified Gold by the Recording Industry Association of America (RIAA). She went on to sign a record deal with RCA Records in 2019.

Her first official release with the label included her EP All the Things I Never Said (2020) and garnered the single "Stupid" which peaked at number 60 on the Canadian Hot 100 marking her first appearance on the chart. She made her US Billboard Hot 100 debut with her follow-up international hit single "You Broke Me First", which peaked at number 17. The song became the lead single off her second EP, Too Young to Be Sad (2021) which peaked at number 94 on the Billboard 200. That same year, she released a string of collaborations including "You" with Regard and Troye Sivan and "Working" with Khalid which peaked at number 58 and 88 on the Hot 100 respectively.

In 2022, McRae released her debut album, I Used to Think I Could Fly (2022) which peaked at number 3 and 13 in Canada and the US respectively. The album garnered the single "She's All I Wanna Be" which reached top ten in Canada and top 50 in the US. She announced her second studio album, Think Later in 2023 and released the song "Greedy" which found critical and commercial success, peaking atop various charts including the Canadian Hot 100 and the Billboard Global 200. The song also became her first top five song on the Billboard Hot 100, peaking at number three. Think Later followed, debuting at numbers three and four in Canada and the US respectively, additionally garnering the single "Exes".

In late 2024, McRae premiered a new single during her Think Later World Tour Madison Square Garden show. "It's OK I'm OK", was later released and became the inaugural number-one song on the US Hot Dance/Pop Songs chart. She followed with her third studio album So Close to What (2025) which debuted at number one on the Billboard 200 and spawned additional singles "2 Hands", "Sports Car" and "Revolving Door". She released the follow-up singles "Just Keep Watching" for the F1 soundtrack, and "What I Want" with Morgan Wallen, which topped the Billboard Hot 100 marking McRae's first number one on the chart.

== Albums ==
=== Studio albums ===
List of studio albums, with selected details, chart positions, and certifications
Title	Studio album details	Peak chart positions										Certifications
Title	Studio album details	CAN	AUS	BEL (FL)	IRE	NLD	NOR	NZ	SWE	UK	US	Certifications
I Used to Think I Could Fly	Released: May 27, 2022; Label: RCA; Format: CD, cassette, LP, streaming, digital download	3	10	15	9	16	5	5	28	7	13	MC: Platinum; BPI: Gold; GLF: Gold; RIAA: Gold; RMNZ: Platinum
Think Later	Released: December 8, 2023; Label: RCA; Format: CD, LP, streaming, digital download	3	2	5	6	6	2	4	4	5	4	MC: Platinum; ARIA: Gold; BPI: Gold; BRMA: Gold; GLF: Gold; IFPI NOR: Platinum; NVPI: Gold; RIAA: Platinum; RMNZ: 2× Platinum
So Close to What	Released: February 21, 2025; Label: RCA; Format: CD, cassette, LP, streaming, digital download	1	1	1	1	1	1	1	2	2	1	MC: 3× Platinum; ARIA: Platinum; BPI: Platinum; NVPI: Gold; RIAA: Platinum; RMNZ: 2× Platinum

=== Compilation albums ===
List of compilation albums, with selected details
Title	Details
The One Day LP	Released: January 27, 2021 (LP), July 25, 2025 (digital); Label: Nettwerk; Format: LP, digital download, streaming

== Extended plays ==
List of extended plays, with selected details, chart positions, and certifications
Title	Details	Peak chart positions							Certifications
Title	Details	CAN	AUS	FIN	NOR	NZ	US	US Heat	Certifications
All the Things I Never Said	Released: January 24, 2020; Label: RCA; Format: Streaming, digital download	—	—	—	—	—	—	16	
Too Young to Be Sad	Released: March 26, 2021; Label: RCA; Format: Streaming, digital download	23	97	34	14	40	94	—	MC: Gold; RMNZ: Platinum
"—" denotes items which were not released in that country or failed to chart.

== Singles ==
=== As lead artist ===
List of singles as a lead artist, with selected peak chart positions and certifications, showing year released and album name
Title	Year	Peak chart positions										Certifications	Album
Title	Year	CAN	AUS	IRE	NLD	NOR	NZ	SWE	UK	US	WW	Certifications	Album
"BFF"	2012	—	—	—	—	—	—	—	—	—	—		Non-album single
"One Day"	2017	—	—	—	—	—	—	—	—	—	—	MC: Platinum; BPI: Silver; RIAA: Platinum; RMNZ: Gold	The One Day LP
"Hung Up on You"	2017	—	—	—	—	—	—	—	—	—	—		The One Day LP
"Hard to Find"	2017	—	—	—	—	—	—	—	—	—	—		The One Day LP
"Teenage Mind"	2018	—	—	—	—	—	—	—	—	—	—	MC: Gold; RIAA: Gold; RMNZ: Gold	The One Day LP
"Shoulder to Shoulder"	2018	—	—	—	—	—	—	—	—	—	—		The One Day LP
"Distant"	2018	—	—	—	—	—	—	—	—	—	—		The One Day LP
"Can't Get It Out"	2018	—	—	—	—	—	—	—	—	—	—		The One Day LP
"Drown"	2018	—	—	—	—	—	—	—	—	—	—		The One Day LP
"Slip"	2019	—	—	—	—	—	—	—	—	—	—		The One Day LP
"Kids Are Alright"	2019	—	—	—	—	—	—	—	—	—	—		Non-album single
"Tear Myself Apart"	2019	—	—	—	—	—	—	—	—	—	—	MC: Gold	All the Things I Never Said
"All My Friends Are Fake"	2019	—	—	—	—	—	—	—	—	—	—		All the Things I Never Said
"Stupid"	2019	60	—	98	—	—	—	—	—	—	—	MC: 2× Platinum; BPI: Silver; RIAA: Platinum; RMNZ: Gold	All the Things I Never Said
"You Broke Me First"	2020	8	7	3	10	4	12	7	3	17	16	MC: 9× Platinum; ARIA: 8× Platinum; BPI: 3× Platinum; GLF: 3× Platinum; IFPI NOR: 4× Platinum; RIAA: 6× Platinum; RMNZ: 5× Platinum	Too Young to Be Sad
"Vicious" (featuring Lil Mosey)	2020	— (Note: "Vicious" did not enter the Billboard Canadian Hot 100, but peaked at number 35 on the Canada CHR/Top 40 chart.)	—	—	—	—	— (Note: "Vicious" did not enter the NZ Top 40 Singles chart, but peaked at number 35 on the NZ Hot Singles chart.)	—	—	—	—		Non-album singles
"Don't Be Sad"	2020	—	—	—	—	—	—	—	—	—	—		Non-album singles
"Lie to Me" (with Ali Gatie)	2020	76	—	—	—	—	— (Note: "Lie to Me" did not enter the NZ Top 40 Singles Chart, but peaked at number 10 on the NZ Hot Singles Chart.)	—	—	—	—	MC: Gold	The Idea of Her
"R U OK"	2020	—	—	—	—	—	— (Note: "R U OK" did not enter the NZ Top 40 Singles Chart, but peaked at number 19 on the NZ Hot Singles Chart.)	—	—	—	—	MC: Gold	Too Young to Be Sad
"Rubberband"	2021	91	—	—	—	—	— (Note: "Rubberband" did not enter the NZ Top 40 Singles Chart, but peaked at number 16 on the NZ Hot Singles Chart.)	—	—	—	—	MC: Gold; RIAA: Gold	Too Young to Be Sad
"Slower"	2021	74	—	—	—	—	— (Note: "Slower" did not enter the NZ Top 40 Singles Chart, but peaked at number 10 on the NZ Hot Singles Chart.)	—	—	—	—	MC: Platinum	Too Young to Be Sad
"You" (with Regard and Troye Sivan)	2021	38	51	50	30	—	— (Note: "You" did not enter the NZ Top 40 Singles Chart, but peaked at number three on the NZ Hot Singles Chart.)	68	46	58	113	MC: 2× Platinum; BPI: Silver; RIAA: Platinum; RMNZ: Gold	Non-album single
"U Love U" (with Blackbear)	2021	91	—	—	—	—	— (Note: "U Love U" did not enter the NZ Top 40 Singles Chart, but peaked at number nine on the NZ Hot Singles Chart.)	—	—	—	—		Misery Lake
"Working" (with Khalid)	2021	47	—	74	—	—	— (Note: "Working" did not enter the NZ Top 40 Singles Chart, but peaked at number six on the NZ Hot Singles Chart.)	— (Note: "Working" did not enter the Swedish Singles Chart, but peaked at number six on the Swedish Heatseeker chart.)	—	88	163	MC: Gold	Non-album single
"That Way" (solo or with Jeremy Zucker)	2021	—	—	59	—	—	—	— (Note: "That Way" did not enter the Swedish Singellista Chart, but peaked at number one on the Swedish Heatseeker Chart.)	82	—	—	MC: 2× Platinum; ARIA: Gold; BPI: Platinum; RIAA: 2× Platinum; RMNZ: Platinum	All the Things I Never Said
"Feel Like Shit"	2021	35	54	29	70	21	— (Note: "Feel Like Shit" did not enter the NZ Top 40 Singles Chart, but peaked at number 11 on the NZ Hot Singles Chart.)	90	52	— (Note: "Feel Like Shit" did not enter the Billboard Hot 100, but peaked at number eight on the Bubbling Under Hot 100 chart.)	105	MC: Platinum; BPI: Silver; RIAA: Platinum; RMNZ: Gold	I Used to Think I Could Fly
"She's All I Wanna Be"	2022	10	19	6	32	8	36	24	14	44	31	MC: 3× Platinum; ARIA: Platinum; BPI: 2× Platinum; GLF: Gold; RIAA: 2× Platinum; RMNZ: 2× Platinum	I Used to Think I Could Fly
"Chaotic"	2022	21	39	15	69	16	— (Note: "Chaotic" did not enter the NZ Top 40 Singles Chart, but peaked at number one on the NZ Hot Singles Chart.)	45	36	80	73	MC: Platinum; BPI: Silver; RIAA: Gold	I Used to Think I Could Fly
"What Would You Do?"	2022	55	100	53	—	—	— (Note: "What Would You Do?" did not enter the NZ Top 40 Singles Chart, but peaked at number six on the NZ Hot Singles Chart.)	—	84	—	—	MC: Gold	I Used to Think I Could Fly
"Uh Oh"	2022	28	61	27	— (Note: "Uh Oh" did not enter the Dutch Single Top 100, but peaked at number three on the Single Tip chart.)	—	— (Note: "Uh Oh" did not enter the NZ Top 40 Singles Chart, but peaked at number two on the NZ Hot Singles Chart.)	— (Note: "Uh Oh" did not enter the Swedish Singellista Chart, but peaked at number one on the Swedish Heatseeker Chart.)	76	— (Note: "Uh Oh" did not enter the Billboard Hot 100, but peaked at number two on the Bubbling Under Hot 100 chart.)	156	BPI: Silver; RIAA: Gold; RMNZ: Gold	Non-album single
"10:35" (with Tiësto)	2022	18	13	5	16	19	29	40	8	69	38	MC: 5× Platinum; ARIA: Platinum; BPI: Platinum; RIAA: Platinum; RMNZ: 2× Platinum	Drive
"Greedy"	2023	1	2	2	1	1	2	6	3	3	1	MC: 8× Platinum; ARIA: 6× Platinum; BPI: 3× Platinum; GLF: Platinum; RIAA: 5× Platinum; RMNZ: 5× Platinum	Think Later
"Exes"	2023	9	15	11	26	12	14	27	12	34	23	MC: 4× Platinum; ARIA: 2× Platinum; BPI: Platinum; RIAA: 3× Platinum; RMNZ: 2× Platinum	Think Later
"It's OK I'm OK"	2024	12	14	13	42	14	12	39	14	20	19	MC: 3× Platinum; ARIA: 3× Platinum; BPI: Platinum; RIAA: 2× Platinum; RMNZ: Platinum	So Close to What
"2 Hands"	2024	22	14	6	49	21	16	54	8	41	32	MC: Platinum; BPI: Silver; RIAA: Gold; RMNZ: Gold	So Close to What
"Sports Car"	2025	9	8	4	22	18	9	50	3	16	17	MC: 4× Platinum; ARIA: 4× Platinum; BPI: Platinum; NVPI: Gold; RIAA: 2× Platinum; RMNZ: 2× Platinum	So Close to What
"Revolving Door"	2025	13	13	9	24	13	11	31	9	22	20	MC: 2× Platinum; ARIA: 2× Platinum; BPI: Platinum; RIAA: Platinum; RMNZ: Platinum	So Close to What
"Just Keep Watching"	2025	16	5	2	31	26	5	27	6	33	8	ARIA: 2× Platinum; BPI: Platinum; RMNZ: Platinum	F1 the Album
"Tit for Tat"	2025	3	6	7	26	16	5	11	6	3	6	MC: Platinum; ARIA: Platinum; BPI: Gold; RIAA: Gold; RMNZ: Platinum	So Close to What???
"Nobody's Girl"	2025	13	19	14	44	36	21	50	16	29	27		So Close to What???
"Housewife"	2026	1	1	1	2	1	1	1	2	2	1		TBA
"—" denotes items which were not released in that country or failed to chart.

=== As featured artist ===
List of singles as a featured artist, with selected peak chart positions and certifications, showing year released and album name
Title	Year	Peak chart positions										Certifications	Album
Title	Year	CAN	AUS	IRL	NLD	NOR	NZ	SWE	UK	US	WW	Certifications	Album
"All Day All Night" (Myles Erlick featuring Tate McRae)	2017	—	—	—	—	—	—	—	—	—	—		ME
"Remembering" (Yutaka Yamada featuring Tate McRae)	2018	—	—	—	—	—	—	—	—	—	—		Tokyo Ghoul:re Original Soundtrack
"Boys Ain't Shit (Remix)" (Saygrace featuring Audrey Mika and Tate McRae)	2020	—	—	—	—	—	—	—	—	—	—		Non-album single
"What I Want" (Morgan Wallen featuring Tate McRae)	2025	2	13	19	61	39	17	80	30	1	5	MC: Platinum; ARIA: Platinum; BPI: Silver; RIAA: 2× Platinum; RMNZ: Platinum	I'm the Problem
"—" denotes items which were not released in that country or failed to chart.

== Other charted and certified songs ==
List of songs, with selected chart positions and certifications, showing year released and album name
Title	Year	Peak chart positions										Certifications	Album
Title	Year	CAN	AUS	GRE Int.	IRE	NOR	NZ	SWE	UK	US	WW	Certifications	Album
"Bad Ones"	2021	—	—	—	—	—	— (Note: "Bad Ones" did not enter the NZ Top 40 Singles Chart, but peaked at number 19 on the NZ Hot Singles Chart.)	—	—	—	—		Too Young to Be Sad
"Don't Come Back"	2022	52	—	—	79	—	— (Note: "Don't Come Back" did not enter the NZ Top 40 Singles Chart, but peaked at number six on the NZ Hot Singles Chart.)	— (Note: "Don't Come Back" did not enter the Swedish Singellista Chart, but peaked at number 19 on the Swedish Heatseeker Chart.)	—	— (Note: "Don't Come Back" did not enter the Billboard Hot 100, but peaked at number 15 on the Bubbling Under Hot 100 chart.)	—	MC: Gold	I Used to Think I Could Fly
"I'm So Gone"	2022	—	—	—	—	—	—	—	—	—	—		I Used to Think I Could Fly
"Hate Myself"	2022	—	—	—	—	—	—	—	—	—	—		I Used to Think I Could Fly
"What's Your Problem?"	2022	—	—	—	—	—	—	—	—	—	—		I Used to Think I Could Fly
"Cut My Hair"	2023	69	—	—	—	—	—	—	—	— (Note: "Cut My Hair" did not enter the Billboard Hot 100, but peaked at number 18 on the Bubbling Under Hot 100 chart.)	—	MC: Gold	Think Later
"Run for the Hills"	2023	34	54	—	39	—	— (Note: "Run for the Hills" did not enter the NZ Top 40 Singles Chart, but peaked at number three on the NZ Hot Singles Chart.)	96	55	69	76	MC: 2× Platinum; BPI: Gold; RIAA: Platinum; RMNZ: Platinum	Think Later
"Hurt My Feelings"	2023	62	—	—	—	—	—	—	—	— (Note: "Hurt My Feelings" did not enter the Billboard Hot 100, but peaked at number six on the Bubbling Under Hot 100 chart.)	—	MC: Gold	Think Later
"Grave"	2023	66	—	—	—	—	—	—	—	— (Note: "Grave" did not enter the Billboard Hot 100, but peaked at number 10 on the Bubbling Under Hot 100 chart.)	—		Think Later
"Stay Done"	2023	95	—	—	—	—	—	—	—	—	—		Think Later
"We're Not Alike"	2023	92	—	—	—	—	—	—	—	—	—	MC: Gold	Think Later
"Calgary"	2023	83	—	—	—	—	—	—	—	—	—		Think Later
"Messier"	2023	97	—	—	—	—	—	—	—	—	—		Think Later
"Guilty Conscience"	2023	—	—	—	—	—	—	—	—	—	—	MC: Gold; RIAA: Gold	Think Later
"Miss Possessive"	2025	32	34	49	52	—	32	—	—	54	55	MC: Gold; RIAA: Gold	So Close to What
"Bloodonmyhands" (featuring Flo Milli)	2025	43	47	—	—	—	—	—	—	64	85	MC: Gold	So Close to What
"Dear God"	2025	25	26	33	26	39	25	— (Note: "Dear God" did not enter the Swedish Singellista Chart, but peaked at number 9 on the Swedish Heatseeker Chart.)	—	44	43	MC: Platinum; BPI: Silver; RIAA: Gold; RMNZ: Gold	So Close to What
"Purple Lace Bra"	2025	30	33	79	—	—	33	—	—	53	60	MC: Platinum; RIAA: Gold	So Close to What
"Signs"	2025	45	63	—	—	—	—	—	—	74	108		So Close to What
"I Know Love" (featuring the Kid Laroi)	2025	24	17	53	44	17	24	71	25	43	37	MC: Platinum; RIAA: Gold; RMNZ: Gold	So Close to What
"Like I Do"	2025	57	79	—	—	—	—	—	—	90	180		So Close to What
"No I'm Not in Love"	2025	66	—	—	—	—	—	—	—	— (Note: "No I'm Not in Love" did not enter the Billboard Hot 100, but peaked at number one on the Bubbling Under Hot 100 chart.)	—		So Close to What
"Means I Care"	2025	61	—	—	—	—	—	—	—	— (Note: "Means I Care" did not enter the Billboard Hot 100, but peaked at number two on the Bubbling Under Hot 100 chart.)	—		So Close to What
"Greenlight"	2025	60	87	—	—	—	—	—	—	99	—		So Close to What
"Nostalgia"	2025	65	—	—	—	—	—	—	—	— (Note: "Nostalgia" did not enter the Billboard Hot 100, but peaked at number three on the Bubbling Under Hot 100 chart.)	—		So Close to What
"Siren Sounds"	2025	57	86	—	62	32	—	— (Note: "Siren Sounds" did not enter the Swedish Singellista Chart, but peaked at number 12 on the Swedish Heatseeker Chart.)	—	— (Note: "Siren Sounds" did not enter the Billboard Hot 100, but peaked at number one on the Bubbling Under Hot 100 chart.)	177	MC: Platinum; BPI: Silver; RIAA: Gold; RMNZ: Gold	So Close to What
"Trying on Shoes"	2025	28	46	—	69	74	34	— (Note: "Trying on Shoes" did not enter the Swedish Singellista Chart, but peaked at number 6 on the Swedish Heatseeker Chart.)	—	59	81		So Close to What??? (Deluxe)
"Anything but Love"	2025	22	31	—	19	99	25	— (Note: "Anything but Love" did not enter the Swedish Singellista Chart, but peaked at number 9 on the Swedish Heatseeker Chart.)	25	44	62		So Close to What??? (Deluxe)
"Horseshoe"	2025	40	83	—	—	—	—	—	—	84	—		So Close to What??? (Deluxe)
"—" denotes items which were not released in that country or failed to chart.
