= List of awards and nominations received by Tate McRae =

Tate McRae awards and nominations
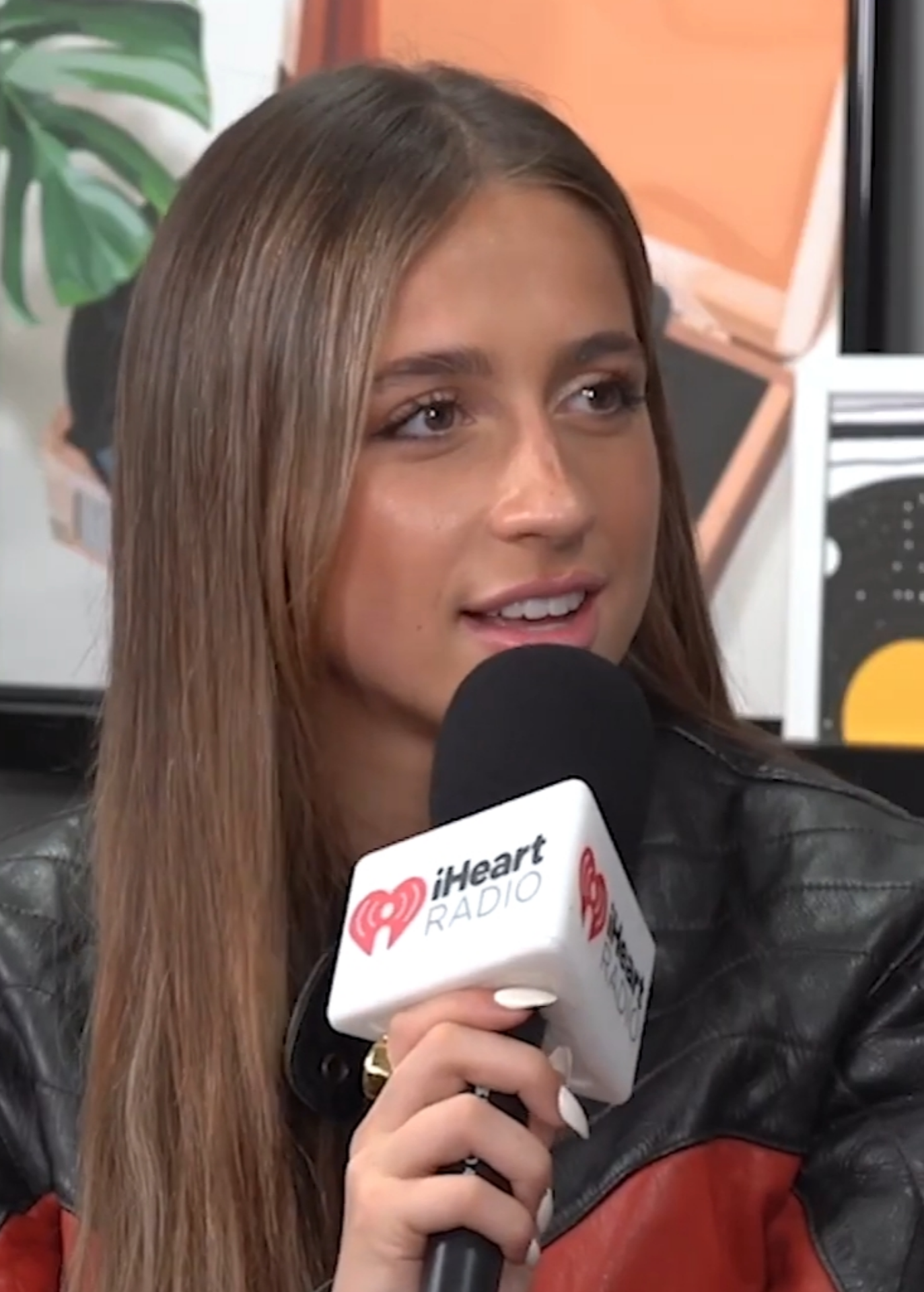
- McRae during interview with iHeartRadio Canada in 2023
Awards and nominations
Award	Wins	Nominations
American Music Awards	0	4
Billboard Music Awards	1	6
Brit Awards	0	1
Grammy Awards	0	1
Juno Awards	10	23
MTV Video Music Awards	2	9

Totals (Note: Certain award groups do not simply award one winner. They acknowledge several different recipients, have runners-up, and have third place. Since this is a specific recognition and is different from losing an award, runner-up mentions are considered wins in this award tally. For simplification and to avoid errors, each award in this list has been presumed to have had a prior nomination.)
- Wins: 27
- Nominations: 93

Canadian singer, songwriter, and dancer Tate McRae has received numerous awards and nominations during her career. McRae signed with RCA Records in August 2019. She then released her debut EP, All the Things I Never Said, on January 24, 2020, and announced her All the Things I Never Said Tour, headlining Europe and North America. Her debut album I Used to Think I Could Fly, was released on May 27, 2022, and debuted at number 13 in the US. She released her sophomore studio album, Think Later, on December 8, 2023. It debuted at number 4 in the US. Its lead single Greedy became her first song to chart within the top ten of the Billboard Hot 100 in the United States, peaking at number three. McRae won the Juno Award for Artist of the Year, and Single of the Year for "Greedy" at the 2024 Juno Awards. McRae went on to perform "Greedy" at various award shows including the Billboard Music Awards, the 2024 NHL All-Star Game, the Brit Awards, and the iHeartRadio Music Awards.

== Awards and nominations ==
Award	Year	Nominee(s) / Work(s)	Category	Result	Ref.
American Music Awards	2026	So Close to What	Album of the Year	Nominated	
American Music Awards	2026	So Close to What	Best Pop Album	Nominated	
American Music Awards	2026	"What I Want"	Collaboration of the Year	Nominated	
American Music Awards	2026	Tate McRae	Best Female Pop Artist	Nominated	
APRA Awards (Australia)	2025	"Greedy"	Most Performed International Work	Won	
ARIA Music Awards	2024	Think Later	Best International Artist	Nominated	
ARIA Music Awards	2025	So Close to What	Best International Artist	Nominated	
Berlin Music Video Awards	2025	"Sports Car"	Best Art Director	Nominated	
Billboard Music Awards	2022	"You"	Top Dance/Electronic Song	Nominated	
Billboard Music Awards	2023	"10:35"	Top Dance/Electronic Song	Nominated	
Billboard Music Awards	2024	"Greedy"	Top Radio Song	Nominated	
Billboard Music Awards	2024	"Greedy"	Top Billboard Global 200 Song	Nominated	
Billboard Music Awards	2024	"Greedy"	Top Billboard Global (Excl. U.S.) Song	Nominated	
Billboard Women in Music	2026	Tate McRae	Hitmaker Award	Won	
BMI Pop Music Awards	2022	"You"	Most-Performed Songs	Won	
BMI Pop Music Awards	2022	"You Broke Me First"	Most-Performed Songs	Won	
BMI Pop Music Awards	2023	"She's All I Wanna Be"	Most-Performed Songs	Won	
BMI Pop Music Awards	2024	"10:35"	Most-Performed Songs	Won	
Bravo Otto	2020	Tate McRae	Newcomer/Breakthrough	Nominated	
BreakTudo Awards	2021	Tate McRae	International Best New Artist	Nominated	
Brit Awards	2024	"Greedy"	International Song	Nominated	
Dance Awards	2013	"Swallow"	Female Best Dancer (Mini)	Won	
Dance Awards	2015	"Isolated"	Female Best Dancer (Junior)	Won	
Dance Awards	2018	"Woman"	Female Best Dancer (Teen)	Won	
Electronic Dance Music Awards	2022	Tate McRae	Best Vocalist	Won	
Electronic Dance Music Awards	2022	"You"	Dance/Electro Pop Song of the Year	Nominated	
Electronic Dance Music Awards	2023	"10:35"	Dance Song of the Year (Radio)	Nominated	
Global Awards	2022	Tate McRae	Rising Star Award	Nominated	
Global Awards	2024	Tate McRae	Rising Star Award	Won	
Global Awards	2024	Tate McRae	Best Female	Nominated	
Global Awards	2024	Tate McRae	Best Pop	Nominated	
Grammy Awards	2026	"Just Keep Watching"	Best Dance Pop Recording	Nominated	
Hollywood Music Video Awards	2025	"It's OK I'm OK"	Music Video of the Year	Nominated	
Hollywood Music Video Awards	2025	"It's OK I'm OK"	Best Choreography	Won	
iHeartRadio Music Awards	2021	Tate McRae	Social Star Award (socially voted)	Nominated	
iHeartRadio Music Awards	2022	Tate McRae	Best New Pop Artist	Nominated	
iHeartRadio Music Awards	2022	"Heather" — Conan Gray	Best Cover Song (socially voted)	Nominated	
iHeartRadio Music Awards	2022	"You"	Dance Song of the Year	Nominated	
iHeartRadio Music Awards	2024	"10:35"	Dance Song of the Year	Nominated	
iHeartRadio Music Awards	2024	"Greedy"	Best Lyrics	Nominated	
iHeartRadio Music Awards	2025	"Greedy"	Song of the Year	Nominated	
iHeartRadio Music Awards	2025	"Greedy"	Pop Song of the Year	Nominated	
iHeartRadio Music Awards	2025	"Exes"	Best Lyrics	Nominated	
iHeartRadio Music Awards	2025	Herself	Pop Artist of the Year	Nominated	
iHeartRadio Music Awards	2025	Herself	Favorite Tour Style	Nominated	
iHeartRadio Music Awards	2025	Herself — Soundcheck covers	Favorite Tour Tradition	Nominated	
iHeartRadio Music Awards	2026	Herself	Artist of the Year	Nominated	
iHeartRadio Music Awards	2026	Herself	Pop Artist of the Year	Nominated	
iHeartRadio Music Awards	2026	"Revolving Door"	Favorite TikTok Dance	Nominated	
iHeartRadio Music Awards	2026	Miss Possessive Tour	Favorite Tour Style	Nominated	
iHeartRadio Music Awards	2026	Fam cam on stage	Favorite Tour Tradition	Nominated	
Industry Dance Awards	2017	Tate McRae	Dancers Choice Awards: Favorite Dancer 17 & Under	Nominated	
Juno Awards	2021	Tate McRae	Breakthrough Artist of the Year	Nominated	
Juno Awards	2021	Tate McRae	Fan Choice Award	Nominated	
Juno Awards	2022	Too Young to Be Sad	Album of the Year	Nominated	
Juno Awards	2022	Too Young to Be Sad	Pop Album of the Year	Nominated	
Juno Awards	2023	I Used to Think I Could Fly	Pop Album of the Year	Nominated	
Juno Awards	2023	I Used to Think I Could Fly	Album of the Year	Nominated	
Juno Awards	2023	"She's All I Wanna Be"	Single of the Year	Nominated	
Juno Awards	2023	Tate McRae	Songwriter of the Year	Nominated	
Juno Awards	2023	Tate McRae	Fan Choice Award	Nominated	
Juno Awards	2024	Tate McRae	Fan Choice Award	Nominated	
Juno Awards	2024	Tate McRae	Artist of the Year	Won	
Juno Awards	2024	"Greedy"	Single of the Year	Won	
Juno Awards	2025	"Exes"	Single of the Year	Won	
Juno Awards	2025	Think Later	Album of the Year	Won	
Juno Awards	2025	Think Later	Pop Album of the Year	Won	
Juno Awards	2025	Tate McRae	Artist of the Year	Won	
Juno Awards	2025	Tate McRae	Fan Choice Award	Nominated	
Juno Awards	2026	Tate McRae	Fan Choice Award	Nominated	
Juno Awards	2026	Tate McRae	Artist of the Year	Won	
Juno Awards	2026	Tate McRae	Songwriter of the Year	Nominated	
Juno Awards	2026	So Close to What	Album of the Year	Won	
Juno Awards	2026	So Close to What	Pop Album of the Year	Won	
Juno Awards	2026	"Sports Car"	Single of the Year	Won	
MTV Europe Music Awards	2020	Tate McRae	Best Push Act	Nominated	
MTV Europe Music Awards	2021	Tate McRae	Best Canadian Act	Nominated	
MTV Europe Music Awards	2022	Tate McRae	Best Canadian Act	Nominated	
MTV Europe Music Awards	2024	Tate McRae	Best Canadian Act	Nominated	
MTV Video Music Awards	2020	Tate McRae	Push Best New Artist	Nominated	
MTV Video Music Awards	2024	Tate McRae	Best Pop	Nominated	
MTV Video Music Awards	2024	"Greedy"	Best Choreography	Nominated	
MTV Video Music Awards	2025	"Sports Car"	Song of the Year	Nominated	
MTV Video Music Awards	2025	Tate McRae	Best Pop Artist	Nominated	
MTV Video Music Awards	2025	"Just Keep Watching"	Best Editing	Won	
MTV Video Music Awards	2025	"Just Keep Watching"	Best Visual Effects	Nominated	
MTV Video Music Awards	2025	"Just Keep Watching"	Song of Summer	Won	
MTV Video Music Awards	2025	"What I Want" (with Morgan Wallen)	Song of Summer	Nominated	
MTV Video Music Awards	2026	"Nobody's Girl"	Best Pop	Nominated	
MTV Video Music Awards	2026	"Nobody's Girl"	Best Dance	Nominated	
MTV Video Music Awards	2026	"Nobody's Girl"	Best Choreography	Nominated	
Nickelodeon Kids' Choice Awards	2024	Tate McRae	Favorite Breakout Artist	Nominated	
Nickelodeon Kids' Choice Awards	2024	"Greedy"	Favorite Viral Song	Nominated	
Nickelodeon Kids' Choice Awards	2025	"Sports Car"	Favorite Viral Song	Nominated	
People's Choice Awards	2021	Tate McRae	The New Artist of 2021	Nominated	
People's Choice Awards	2024	Tate McRae	The Pop Artist of the Year	Nominated	
People's Choice Awards	2024	"Greedy"	The Song of the Year	Nominated	
SOCAN Awards	2021	Tate McRae	SOCAN Pop Music Award	Won	
SOCAN Awards	2021	Tate McRae	SOCAN Breakout Songwriter Award	Won	
Western Canadian Music Awards	2021	Tate McRae	BreakOut Artist of the Year	Nominated	
Western Canadian Music Awards	2021	Tate McRae	Pop Artist of the Year	Nominated	
Youth America Grand Prix	2015	"Isolated" and "All the Night"	Women – Pre Competitive Age Division	Silver	
Youth America Grand Prix	2015	"Pas de Deux from William Tell"	Pas de Deux – All Ages	Bronze	
Youth America Grand Prix	2017	"Porcelain" and "Stillness"	Women – Contemporary – Junior Age Division (regionals)	Won	
