= Miss Possessive Tour =

2025 concert tour by Tate McRae

- Tour by Tate McRae
- Promotional poster for North American concerts
- Location: Europe; North America; South America
- Associated album: So Close to What
- Start date: March 18, 2025
- End date: November 8, 2025
- No. of shows: 83
- Supporting acts: Benee; Zara Larsson; Alessi Rose; Samuraï
- Producer: Live Nation
- Attendance: 1,033,500 (Note: Based on 76 reported concerts.)
- Box office: US$110.7 million
- Website: tatemcrae.com/tour

Tate McRae concert chronology
- Think Later World Tour (2024); Miss Possessive Tour (2025)

The Miss Possessive Tour was the fifth concert tour and first all-arena tour by the Canadian singer Tate McRae. It commenced on March 18, 2025, in Mexico City, Mexico, and concluded on November 8, 2025, in Inglewood, United States, featuring 83 shows. Launched in support of her third studio album, So Close to What (2025), it was promoted by Live Nation, with Benee, Zara Larsson, Alessi Rose, and Samuraï serving as supporting acts. The tour included McRae's headlining performances at several musical festivals, including select Lollapalooza events and Estéreo Picnic.

== Announcements ==
On November 14, 2024, Tate McRae announced the release date and title of her third studio album, So Close to What (2025). Promoter Live Nation announced the Miss Possessive Tour in support of the album, spanning 50 concerts across Europe, North America and South America. Benee was announced as supporting act for European concerts, while Zara Larsson will support concerts in North America. On November 19, 2024, secondary shows in Vancouver, Toronto, Boston, New York City, Orlando and Inglewood were added due to demand. Two days later, a second concert in Dublin, Ireland, was announced. On February 19, 2025, twenty additional concerts across the United Kingdom and the United States, as well as announced Alessi Rose as the supporting act for the North American concerts. Additional concerts in Seattle, Washington, and Phoenix, Arizona, were added. Samuraï served as supporting act for McRae's concert in Mexico City, Mexico, on March 18, 2025.

== Commercial performance ==
=== Boxscore ===
The tour sold more than a million tickets and grossed over US$110 million dollars. In their year-end report for 2025, Billboard acknowledged the tour as the thirty-ninth best of the year, generating US$75.8 million USD and attracting an audience of 795,000 between October 1, 2024, and September 30, 2025; it was further named the ninth-highest-grossing pop tour for the year.

== Broadcasts ==
In the January 2026 issue of Rolling Stone, McRae teased the potential release of a documentary from the tour.

== Set list ==
=== March 2025 ===
This set list is from the concert in Mexico City on March 18, 2025.

1. "Sports Car"
2. "2 Hands"
3. "Hurt My Feelings"
4. "Uh Oh"
5. "Dear God"
6. "Cut My Hair" (guitar solo outro)
7. "You Broke Me First"
8. "Run for the Hills"
9. "Siren Sounds" (extended outro)
10. "It's OK I'm OK" (shortened)
11. "Exes"
12. "She's All I Wanna Be"
13. "Revolving Door" (extended outro; dancers break)
14. "Bloodonmyhands"
15. "10:35" (long version)
16. "Greedy"

=== May to November 2025 ===
This set list is from the concert in Lisbon on May 7, 2025. It does not represent all shows throughout the tour.

Act I

1. "Miss Possessive"
2. "No I'm Not in Love"
3. "2 Hands"
4. "Guilty Conscience"

Act II

5. "Purple Lace Bra"
6. "Like I Do"
7. "Uh Oh"
8. "Dear God"
9. "Siren Sounds"

Act III

10. "Greenlight
11. "Nostalgia"
12. "That Way" / "Chaotic" / "One Day"
13. "You Broke Me First"
14. "Run for the Hills"

Act IV

15. "Exes"
16. "Bloodonmyhands"
17. "She's All I Wanna Be"
18. "Revolving Door"
19. "It's OK I'm OK"

Act V

20. "Sports Car"
21. "Greedy"

==== Alterations and notes ====
- During the August 4, 2025, concert in Vancouver, "Purple Lace Bra" was not performed, "Feel Like Shit" was added to the third act medley (succeeding "One Day"), and "Just Keep Watching" was performed during the fifth act preceding "Sports Car".
- During the September 11, 2025, concert in Nashville, "6 Months Later" was performed with Megan Moroney during the third act.
- During the September 27, 2025, concert in Inglewood (Note: Labelled as Los Angeles in promotional material.), "Tit for Tat" was performed.

==== VIP soundcheck ====
Beginning in May 2025, McRae performed one song for VIP ticket holders following a questions and answers session.

- May 7, 2025 – Lisbon: "Means I Care" by McRae
- May 9, 2025 – Madrid: "Means I Care" by McRae
- May 13, 2025 – Stuttgart: "The 1" by Taylor Swift
- May 14, 2025 – Antwerp: "Means I Care" by McRae
- May 16, 2025 – Dublin: "Sympathy Is a Knife" by Charli XCX
- May 17, 2025 – Dublin: "The 1" by Swift
- May 19, 2025 – Birmingham: "We're Not Alike" by McRae
- May 20, 2025 – London: "Means I Care" by McRae
- May 23, 2025 – Glasgow: "Touch It" by Ariana Grande
- May 24, 2025 – Manchester: "Special" by SZA
- May 27, 2025 – Paris: "F2F" by SZA
- May 28, 2025 – Amsterdam: "Touch It" by Grande
- May 30, 2025 – Copenhagen: "Means I Care" by McRae
- June 1, 2025 – Stockholm: "F2F" by SZA
- June 3, 2025 – Hamburg: "Somebody Else" by the 1975
- June 4, 2025 – Berlin: "Fetish" by Selena Gomez
- June 6, 2025 – Łódź: "Stay Done" by McRae
- June 8, 2025 – Vienna: "Scared to Be Lonely" by Martin Garrix and Dua Lipa
- June 10, 2025 – Prague: "Stay Done" by McRae
- June 11, 2025 – Munich: "Messier" by McRae
- June 13, 2025 – Casalecchio di Reno: (Note: Labelled as Bologna in promotional material.) – "Stay Done" by McRae
- June 16, 2025 – Cologne: "The 1" by Swift
- June 18, 2025 – Zürich: "Don't Smile" by Sabrina Carpenter
- June 22, 2025 – Nottingham: "Don't Smile" by Carpenter
- June 24, 2025 – London: "Blowing Smoke" by Gracie Abrams
- August 4, 2025 – Vancouver: "Yukon" by Justin Bieber
- August 5, 2025 – Vancouver: "Walking Away" by Bieber
- August 7, 2025 – Edmonton: "What a Time" by Julia Michaels featuring Niall Horan
- August 9, 2025 – Winnipeg: "Video Games" by Lana Del Rey
- August 13, 2025 – St. Paul: "Fix You" by Coldplay
- August 15, 2025 – Chicago: "Messier" by McRae
- August 16, 2025 – Detroit: "Back to Friends" by Sombr
- August 19, 2025 – Toronto: "B.O.A.T." by Camila Cabello
- August 20, 2025 – Toronto: "Shot for Me" by Drake
- August 22, 2025 – Ottawa: "Nights Like This" by Kehlani
- August 24, 2025 – Montreal: "Plastic Palm Trees" by McRae
- August 29, 2025 – Cleveland: "Calgary" by McRae
- September 3, 2025 – New York: "Stick Season" by Noah Kahan
- September 4, 2025 – New York: "Fix You" by Coldplay
- September 6, 2025 – Philadelphia: "Plastic Palm Trees" by McRae
- September 9, 2025 – Atlanta: "Breathin' " by Grande
- September 11, 2025 – Nashville: "Stay Done" by McRae
- September 13, 2025 – Orlando: "Somebody Else" by the 1975
- September 14, 2025 – Orlando: "Boy X" by McRae
- September 16, 2025 – Austin: "Means I Care" by McRae
- September 18, 2025 – Dallas: "I Still Say Goodnight" by McRae
- September 20, 2025 – Denver: "Chemical" by Post Malone
- September 24, 2025 – San Francisco: "Means I Care" by McRae
- September 26, 2025 – Inglewood: "Plastic Palm Trees" by McRae
- September 27, 2025 – Inglewood: "Special" by SZA
- October 3, 2025 – Seattle: "Want That Too" by McRae
- October 5, 2025 – Sacramento: "Don't Smile" by Carpenter
- October 7, 2025 – Salt Lake City: "Nights Like This" by Kehlani
- October 9, 2025 – Omaha: "Means I Care" by McRae
- October 11, 2025 – St. Louis: "Sweater Weather" by the Neighbourhood
- October 13, 2025 – Detroit: "Apologize" by Timbaland featuring OneRepublic
- October 15, 2025 – Pittsburgh: "Messier" by McRae
- October 17, 2025 – Boston: "Means I Care" by McRae
- October 21, 2025 – Chicago: "Plastic Palm Trees" by McRae
- October 22, 2025 – Grand Rapids: "Want That Too" by McRae
- October 24, 2025 – Charlotte: "Means I Care" by McRae
- October 25, 2025 – Raleigh: "Want That Too" by McRae
- October 28, 2025 – Kansas City: "Means I Care" by McRae
- October 31, 2025 – Austin: "Save Your Tears" by the Weeknd
- November 1, 2025 – Houston: "Means I Care" by McRae
- November 4, 2025 – Phoenix: "Nostalgia" by McRae
- November 5, 2025 – Phoenix: "Boy X" by McRae
- November 7, 2025 – Thousand Palms (Note: Labelled as Palm Springs in promotional material.): "Stay Done" by McRae
- November 8, 2025 – Inglewood: "Wildest Dreams" by Swift

== Tour dates ==
List of 2025 concerts
Date (2025)	City	Country	Venue	Supporting acts	Attendance	Revenue
March 18	Mexico City	Mexico	Pepsi Center WTC (Note: Labelled as Pepsi Centre in press announcement.)	Samuraï	—	—
March 22 (Note: This concert was part of Lollapalooza Argentina.)	Buenos Aires	Argentina	Hipódromo de San Isidro	—N/a		
March 23 (Note: This concert was part of Lollapalooza Chile.)	Santiago	Chile	Parque Cerrillos	—N/a		
March 25	Santiago	Chile	Teatro Coliseo	—N/a	—	—
March 27 (Note: This concert was part of Festival Estéreo Picnic.)	Bogotá	Colombia	Simón Bolívar Park	—N/a		
March 29 (Note: This concert was part of Lollapalooza Brazil.)	São Paulo	Brazil	Autódromo de Interlagos	—N/a		
May 7	Lisbon	Portugal	MEO Arena	Benee	188,000	$14,400,000
May 9	Madrid	Spain	Palacio Vistalegre	Benee	188,000	$14,400,000
May 13	Stuttgart	Germany	Hanns-Martin-Schleyer-Halle	Benee	188,000	$14,400,000
May 14	Antwerp	Belgium	Sportpaleis	Benee	188,000	$14,400,000
May 16	Dublin	Ireland	3Arena	Benee	188,000	$14,400,000
May 17	Dublin	Ireland	3Arena	Benee	188,000	$14,400,000
May 19	Birmingham	England	Utilita Arena Birmingham	Benee	188,000	$14,400,000
May 20	London	England	The O_{2} Arena	Benee	188,000	$14,400,000
May 23	Glasgow	Scotland	OVO Hydro	Benee	188,000	$14,400,000
May 24	Manchester	England	Co-op Live	Benee	188,000	$14,400,000
May 27	Paris	France	Accor Arena	Benee	188,000	$14,400,000
May 28	Amsterdam	Netherlands	Ziggo Dome	Benee	188,000	$14,400,000
May 30	Copenhagen	Denmark	Royal Arena	Benee	188,000	$14,400,000
June 1	Stockholm	Sweden	Avicii Arena	Benee	172,000 (Note: The concerts for the month of June 2025 are combined into a single boxscore.)	$13,600,000
June 3	Hamburg	Germany	Barclays Arena	Benee	172,000	$13,600,000
June 4	Berlin	Germany	Uber Arena	Benee	172,000	$13,600,000
June 6	Łódź	Poland	Atlas Arena	Benee	172,000	$13,600,000
June 8	Vienna	Austria	Wiener Stadthalle	Benee	172,000	$13,600,000
June 10	Prague	Czech Republic	O_{2} Arena	Benee	172,000	$13,600,000
June 11	Munich	Germany	Olympiahalle	Benee	172,000	$13,600,000
June 13	Casalecchio di Reno	Italy	Unipol Arena	Benee	172,000	$13,600,000
June 16	Cologne	Germany	Lanxess Arena	Benee	172,000	$13,600,000
June 18	Zürich	Switzerland	Hallenstadion	Benee	172,000	$13,600,000
June 20 (Note: This concert was part of Pinkpop Festival.)	Landgraaf	Netherlands	Megaland Park	—N/a		
June 22	Nottingham	England	Motorpoint Arena Nottingham	Benee		
June 24	London	England	The O_{2} Arena	Benee		
June 25	Manchester	England	Co-op Live	Benee		
August 4	Vancouver	Canada	Rogers Arena	Zara Larsson	208,000	$22,700,000
August 5	Vancouver	Canada	Rogers Arena	Zara Larsson	208,000	$22,700,000
August 7	Edmonton	Canada	Rogers Place	Zara Larsson	208,000	$22,700,000
August 9	Winnipeg	Canada	Canada Life Centre	Zara Larsson	208,000	$22,700,000
August 13	Saint Paul	United States	Xcel Energy Center	Zara Larsson	208,000	$22,700,000
August 15	Chicago	United States	United Center	Zara Larsson	208,000	$22,700,000
August 16	Detroit	United States	Little Caesars Arena	Zara Larsson	208,000	$22,700,000
August 19	Toronto	Canada	Scotiabank Arena	Zara Larsson	208,000	$22,700,000
August 20	Toronto	Canada	Scotiabank Arena	Zara Larsson	208,000	$22,700,000
August 22	Ottawa	Canada	Canadian Tire Centre	Zara Larsson	208,000	$22,700,000
August 24	Montreal	Canada	Bell Centre	Zara Larsson	208,000	$22,700,000
August 26	Boston	United States	TD Garden	Zara Larsson	208,000	$22,700,000
August 27	Boston	United States	TD Garden	Zara Larsson	208,000	$22,700,000
August 29	Cleveland	United States	Rocket Arena	Zara Larsson	208,000	$22,700,000
August 31	Baltimore	United States	CFG Bank Arena	Zara Larsson	208,000	$22,700,000
September 3	New York City	United States	Madison Square Garden	Zara Larsson	175,000	$21,900,000
September 4	New York City	United States	Madison Square Garden	Zara Larsson	175,000	$21,900,000
September 6	Philadelphia	United States	Xfinity Mobile Arena	Zara Larsson	175,000	$21,900,000
September 9	Atlanta	United States	State Farm Arena	Zara Larsson	175,000	$21,900,000
September 11	Nashville	United States	Bridgestone Arena	Zara Larsson	175,000	$21,900,000
September 13	Orlando	United States	Kia Center	Zara Larsson	175,000	$21,900,000
September 14	Orlando	United States	Kia Center	Zara Larsson	175,000	$21,900,000
September 16	Austin	United States	Moody Center	Zara Larsson	175,000	$21,900,000
September 18	Dallas	United States	American Airlines Center	Zara Larsson	175,000	$21,900,000
September 20	Denver	United States	Ball Arena	Zara Larsson	175,000	$21,900,000
September 24	San Francisco	United States	Chase Center	Zara Larsson	175,000	$21,900,000
September 26	Inglewood	United States	Kia Forum	Zara Larsson	175,000	$21,900,000
September 27	Inglewood	United States	Kia Forum	Zara Larsson	175,000	$21,900,000
October 2	Seattle	United States	Climate Pledge Arena	Alessi Rose	229,000	$30,200,000
October 3	Seattle	United States	Climate Pledge Arena	Alessi Rose	229,000	$30,200,000
October 5	Sacramento	United States	Golden 1 Center	Alessi Rose	229,000	$30,200,000
October 7	Salt Lake City	United States	Delta Center	Alessi Rose	229,000	$30,200,000
October 9	Omaha	United States	CHI Health Center Omaha	Alessi Rose	229,000	$30,200,000
October 11	St. Louis	United States	Enterprise Center	Alessi Rose	229,000	$30,200,000
October 13	Detroit	United States	Little Caesars Arena	Alessi Rose	229,000	$30,200,000
October 15	Pittsburgh	United States	PPG Paints Arena	Alessi Rose	229,000	$30,200,000
October 17	Boston	United States	TD Garden	Alessi Rose	229,000	$30,200,000
October 18	New York City	United States	Madison Square Garden	Alessi Rose	229,000	$30,200,000
October 21	Chicago	United States	United Center	Alessi Rose	229,000	$30,200,000
October 22	Grand Rapids	United States	Van Andel Arena	Alessi Rose	229,000	$30,200,000
October 24	Charlotte	United States	Spectrum Center	Alessi Rose	229,000	$30,200,000
October 25	Raleigh	United States	Lenovo Center	Alessi Rose	229,000	$30,200,000
October 28	Kansas City	United States	T-Mobile Center	Alessi Rose	229,000	$30,200,000
October 29	Tulsa	United States	BOK Center	Alessi Rose	229,000	$30,200,000
October 31	Austin	United States	Moody Center	Alessi Rose	229,000	$30,200,000
November 1	Houston	United States	Toyota Center	Alessi Rose	61,500	$7,900,000
November 4	Phoenix	United States	Mortgage Matchup Center	Alessi Rose	61,500	$7,900,000
November 5	Phoenix	United States	Mortgage Matchup Center	Alessi Rose	61,500	$7,900,000
November 7	Thousand Palms	United States	Acrisure Arena	Alessi Rose	61,500	$7,900,000
November 8	Inglewood	United States	Kia Forum	Alessi Rose	61,500	$7,900,000
Total					1,033,500	$110,700,000
