= Housewife (Tate McRae song) =

Single by Tate McRae
- Released: October 15, 2026
- Length: 3:28
- Label: RCA
- Songwriters: Tate McRae; Julia Michaels; Ryan Tedder; Jasper Harris; Pablo Diaz-Reixa; Grant Boutin
- Producers: Ryan Tedder; Grant Boutin; El Guincho; Jasper Harris

Tate McRae singles chronology
"Nobody's Girl" (2025)	"Housewife" (2026)

"Housewife" is a song by Canadian singer Tate McRae. It was released on October 15, 2026, through RCA Records, as the lead single from her upcoming fourth studio album. The song peaked at number one in Australia, Austria, Canada, Denmark, Germany, Ireland, Latvia, New Zealand, Norway, Singapore, Sweden and Switzerland, and has reached the top ten in Finland, Lithuania, the Netherlands, Poland, the United Kingdom, and the United States.

== Background and promotion ==
Following the release of her third studio album, So Close to What (2025), McRae began working on material for her fourth studio album. In an August 2026 interview with Harper's Bazaar, McRae announced she was working on new material, revealing that she was headed to the recording studio immediately after the interview. McRae also cited American singer Dolly Parton as a major inspiration for the album.

The title "Housewife" first appeared onscreen as an Easter egg during McRae's performance at Lollapalooza on August 2, 2026. Two months later, she announced the song as her next single, with a scheduled release date of October 15. The single marks her first release in nearly a year, following "Nobody's Girl" in November 2025, and ushers in a new era that the singer had been quietly teasing for several months leading up to its release. McRae announced the song on Instagram, accompanied by a caption featuring a wedding-ring emoji. The announcement included its cover art, which depicts her wearing a red bikini and sunglasses while pushing a stroller filled with dollar bills. The song was made available for pre-save at the time of the announcement. The aesthetic was widely interpreted as a playful reference to the housewife stereotype, drawing comparisons to the concepts of the "trophy wife" and "tradwife".

Shortly after the announcement, McRae appeared on the October 7, 2026, episode of The Tonight Show Starring Jimmy Fallon, where she expressed her excitement about releasing new music, describing the song as being about "a woman who can't be contained". She also revealed that the accompanying music video was filmed in Southern France, calling the shoot "so magical and so fun". A teaser for the music video was released on October 14, announcing its premiere for the following day at 8 p.m. ET. She performed the song at the Victoria's Secret Fashion Show 2026 on October 18, alongside "Dear God" and "Sports Car".

== Music video ==
The music video for "Housewife" was directed by Pierre-Ange Carlotti, taking place on the Mediterranean and released on October 15, 2026. It featured Swedish former ice hockey player Simon Lööf, Dutch Thijmen Oerlemans and British Ruben Moreiram, with McRae dancing on a yacht christened "Tati" where she meets Thijmen, golfs off it and reads La Vagabonde, practices boxing with Ruben, dances on lawns/balconies of lavish estates, fawns over a baby carriage full of U.S. currency, lounges by the pool with Ruben coming over with a copy of "The Flash", a The Sun tabloid-parody expressing annoyance over a headline reading "Marriage Material?" with Tate throwing it in the pool and then fights with Simon in her accommodations.

== Charts ==
=== Weekly charts ===
Weekly chart performance
Chart (2026)	Peak position
Argentina Anglo Airplay (Monitor Latino)	6
Australia (ARIA)	1
Australia Airplay (RCS)	8
Austria (Ö3 Austria Top 40)	1
Austria Airplay (IFPI)	14
Belarus Airplay (TopHit)	59
Belgium (Ultratop 50 Flanders)	3
Belgium (Ultratop 50 Wallonia)	22
Bolivia Anglo Airplay (Monitor Latino)	2
Brazil Hot 100 (Billboard)	63
Canada Hot 100 (Billboard)	1
Central America Anglo Airplay (Monitor Latino)	8
Colombia Anglo Airplay (Monitor Latino)	13
CIS Airplay (TopHit)	26
Costa Rica Anglo Airplay (Monitor Latino)	9
Croatia (Billboard)	8
Croatia International Airplay (Top lista)	5
Czech Republic Singles Digital (ČNS IFPI)	3
Denmark (Tracklisten)	1
Dominican Republic Anglo Airplay (Monitor Latino)	15
Estonia Airplay (TopHit)	4
Finland (Suomen virallinen lista)	3
France (SNEP)	13
France Airplay (SNEP)	20
Germany (GfK)	1
Germany Airplay (MusicTrace)	10
Global 200 (Billboard)	1
Guatemala Anglo Airplay (Monitor Latino)	10
Hong Kong (Billboard)	15
Hungary (Single Top 40)	13
Iceland (Billboard)	2
Ireland (IRMA)	1
Israel (Mako Hitlist)	29
Israel International Airplay (Media Forest)	1
Italy (FIMI)	18
Italy Airplay (EarOne)	22
Jamaica Airplay (JAMMS)	7
Japan Hot Overseas (Billboard Japan)	17
Kazakhstan Airplay (TopHit)	46
Latin America Anglo Airplay (Monitor Latino)	14
Latvia Airplay (TopHit)	3
Latvia Streaming (LaIPA)	1
Lebanon (Lebanese Top 20)	4
Lithuania (AGATA)	3
Lithuania Airplay (TopHit)	1
Luxembourg (Billboard)	1
Malaysia (IFPI)	8
Malaysia International (RIM)	6
Malta Airplay (Radiomonitor)	17
Mexico Anglo Airplay (Monitor Latino)	3
Middle East and North Africa (IFPI)	8
Moldova Airplay (TopHit)	47
Netherlands (Dutch Top 40)	4
Netherlands (Single Top 100)	2
New Zealand (Recorded Music NZ)	1
New Zealand Airplay (RCS)	8
Norway (VG-lista)	1
Norway Airplay (IFPI)	20
Panama Anglo Airplay (Monitor Latino)	12
Panama Streaming (PRODUCE)	23
Poland Airplay (OLiS)	23
Poland Streaming (OLiS)	4
Portugal (AFP)	2
Puerto Rico Anglo Airplay (Monitor Latino)	6
Romania (Billboard)	3
Romania Airplay (TopHit)	141
Russia Airplay (TopHit)	70
San Marino Airplay (SMRTV Top 50)	33
Saudi Arabia (IFPI)	14
Singapore (RIAS)	1
Slovakia Airplay (ČNS IFPI)	45
Slovakia Singles Digital (ČNS IFPI)	4
South Africa Airplay (TOSAC)	14
South Africa Streaming (TOSAC)	11
Spain (Promusicae)	24
Spain Airplay (Promusicae)	14
Sweden (Sverigetopplistan)	1
Switzerland (Schweizer Hitparade)	1
Taiwan (Billboard)	18
Ukraine Airplay (TopHit)	109
United Arab Emirates (IFPI)	3
UK Singles (Official Charts)	2
US Billboard Hot 100	2
US Adult Pop Airplay (Billboard)	16
US Pop Airplay (Billboard)	12
Venezuela Anglo Airplay (Monitor Latino)	6
Vietnam Hot 100 (Billboard)	64

=== Monthly charts ===
Monthly chart performance
Chart (2026)	Peak position
Lithuania Airplay (TopHit)	35

== Release history ==
Release history
Region	Date	Format	Label	Ref.
Various	October 15, 2026	Digital download; streaming	RCA	
United States	October 15, 2026	Hot adult contemporary radio; contemporary hit radio	RCA	
Italy	October 23, 2026	Radio airplay	Sony Music	
