= Anything but Love (disambiguation) =

Anything but Love is an American sitcom.

Anything but Love may also refer to:

- "Anything but Love" (Daniel Schuhmacher song), 2009
- "Anything but Love" (Tate McRae song), 2025
- "S.O.S. (Anything But Love)", a 2007 song by Apocalyptica featuring Cristina Scabbia
