= Tit for Tat (Tate McRae song) =

2025 single by Tate McRae

Single by Tate McRae
- Written: September 11, 2025
- Released: September 26, 2025
- Recorded: September 18, 2025
- Studio: American Airlines Center (Dallas)
- Genre: Pop
- Length: 2:55
- Label: RCA
- Songwriters: Tate McRae; Ryan Tedder; Julia Michaels; Grant Boutin
- Producers: Ryan Tedder; Grant Boutin

Tate McRae singles chronology
"Just Keep Watching" (2025)	"Tit for Tat" (2025)	"Nobody's Girl" (2025)

Lyric video
- "Tit for Tat" on YouTube

"Tit for Tat" is a song by Canadian singer Tate McRae. Released on September 26, 2025, through RCA Records. It was included on the deluxe edition of her album So Close to What (2025), and it debuted at number three on the US Billboard Hot 100. McRae co-wrote it with the American songwriter Julia Michaels and the producers Ryan Tedder and Grant Boutin. The song is reported to be a breakup response to former boyfriend the Kid Laroi's song, "A Cold Play", following their breakup in July 2025.

== Background and promotion ==
In July 2025, McRae ended her year and a half relationship with the Australian singer and rapper the Kid Laroi. On September 5, 2025, Laroi released the post-breakup single "A Cold Play", expressing his wish to repair his partner. Just three weeks later, McRae issued her response track titled "Tit for Tat". McRae wrote "Tit for Tat" during her Miss Possessive Tour stop in Nashville, Tennessee, on September 11, 2025, and recorded it seven days later on September 18 at her Dallas, Texas, stop. The song was subtly teased via a glitching tour screen that briefly displayed the title in its abbreviated form "T4T". She announced the track on September 24.

== Music and production ==
"Tit for Tat" is 2 minutes and 55 seconds long. The song was recorded at American Airlines Center in Dallas. Ryan Tedder produced the song, while Grant Boutin provided vocal production. He played keyboard, synthesizer, and programmed drums. Tom Norris mixed the song at Snackworld in Los Angeles, and Chris Gehringer mastered the song at Sterling Sound in Edgewater.

== Composition ==
Described as a "simmering rhythmic pop track", it has been characterized as "an indignant kiss-off to an ex". The title derives from the British expression "tit for tat", which refers to retaliation, framing the song as McRae's response to Laroi's "A Cold Play". In the lyrics, she warns Laroi that if he continues releasing songs about her, she will share her own perspective. The track also alludes to Laroi moving on with a new partner, while reflecting that he was not the person she believed he would be. However, although most people think this track is about Laroi, Tate herself never actually confirmed that so it could be about anyone.

== Accolades ==
Tit for Tat has received 1 nomination in its run. This nominee, for Kids Choice Awards 2026’s “favorite viral song” would become her third nominee in that category following Greedy in 2024 and Sports Car in 2025.

== Charts ==
=== Weekly charts ===
Chart performance
Chart (2025–2026)	Peak position
Argentina Anglo Airplay (Monitor Latino)	17
Australia (ARIA)	6
Austria (Ö3 Austria Top 40)	6
Canada Hot 100 (Billboard)	3
Canada CHR/Top 40 (Billboard)	8
Canada Hot AC (Billboard)	23
CIS Airplay (TopHit)	111
Croatia International Airplay (Top lista)	47
Czech Republic Singles Digital (ČNS IFPI)	34
Denmark (Tracklisten)	32
Estonia Airplay (TopHit)	10
France (SNEP)	117
Germany (GfK)	20
Global 200 (Billboard)	6
Greece International (IFPI)	3
Guatemala Anglo Airplay (Monitor Latino)	8
Iceland (Tónlistinn)	21
Ireland (IRMA)	7
Latvia Streaming (LaIPA)	19
Lebanon (Lebanese Top 20)	3
Lithuania (AGATA)	45
Lithuania Airplay (TopHit)	7
Luxembourg (Billboard)	16
Malta Airplay (Radiomonitor)	9
Mexico Anglo Airplay (Monitor Latino)	18
Netherlands (Single Top 100)	26
New Zealand (Recorded Music NZ)	5
Norway (IFPI Norge)	16
Panama Anglo Airplay (Monitor Latino)	12
Peru Anglo Airplay (Monitor Latino)	11
Poland (Polish Streaming Top 100)	53
Portugal (AFP)	16
Romania Airplay (TopHit)	48
Singapore (RIAS)	11
Slovakia Airplay (ČNS IFPI)	33
Slovakia Singles Digital (ČNS IFPI)	38
Sweden (Sverigetopplistan)	11
Switzerland (Schweizer Hitparade)	10
UK Singles (Official Charts)	6
US Billboard Hot 100	3
US Adult Contemporary (Billboard)	20
US Adult Pop Airplay (Billboard)	10
US Dance Airplay (Billboard)	18
US Pop Airplay (Billboard)	5
Venezuela Anglo Airplay (Monitor Latino)	3

=== Monthly charts ===
Monthly chart performance
Chart (2025)	Peak position
Estonia Airplay (TopHit)	26
Lithuania Airplay (TopHit)	9
Romania Airplay (TopHit)	55

=== Year-end charts ===
Year-end chart performance for "Tit for Tat"
Chart (2025)	Position
Estonia Airplay (TopHit)	120

== Certifications ==
Certifications
Region	Certification	Certified units/sales
Australia (ARIA)	Platinum	70,000^{‡}
Canada (Music Canada)	Platinum	80,000^{‡}
New Zealand (RMNZ)	Platinum	30,000^{‡}
United Kingdom (BPI)	Gold	400,000^{‡}
United States (RIAA)	Gold	500,000^{‡}
^{‡} Sales+streaming figures based on certification alone.

== Release history ==
Release history
Region	Date	Format	Label	Ref.
Various	September 26, 2025	Digital download; streaming	RCA	
Italy	October 10, 2025	Radio airplay	Sony Italy	
United States	October 14, 2025	Contemporary hit radio	RCA	
