= Revolving Door (Tate McRae song) =

2025 single by Tate McRae

- Remix bundle cover

Single by Tate McRae

from the album So Close to What
- Released: March 7, 2025
- Genre: Pop; Jersey club
- Length: 3:00
- Label: RCA
- Songwriters: Tate McRae; Grant Boutin; Julia Michaels; Ryan Tedder
- Producers: Grant Boutin; Ryan Tedder

Tate McRae singles chronology
"Sports Car" (2025)	"Revolving Door" (2025)	"What I Want" (2025)

Music video
- "Revolving Door" on YouTube

"Revolving Door" is a song by Canadian singer Tate McRae from her third studio album, So Close to What (2025). It was released through RCA Records on March 7, 2025 as the album's fourth single. McRae wrote the track with Julia Michaels and its producers, Grant Boutin and Ryan Tedder. "Revolving Door" is a pop and Jersey club ballad with lyrics about coming back to a toxic relationship repeatedly.

Aerin Moreno directed the accompanying music video for "Revolving Door", which premiered on the same date as the single's release. It sees McRae and a group of dancers performing in a room with fifteen doors. Upon its release, the song received generally positive reviews from critics, some of which named it a highlight on So Close to What. Commercially, it has reached number 9 in the United Kingdom and the top 20 on the Billboard Global 200 as well as in Australia, Canada, Ireland, New Zealand, and Norway, and became her second number one single on the Billboard Hot Dance/Pop Songs chart. McRae performed "Revolving Door" on The Tonight Show Starring Jimmy Fallon.

== Background and release ==
On November 14, 2024, Tate McRae announced the release of her third studio album, So Close to What. She also announced the Miss Possessive Tour, which took place in North America, South America, and Europe between March and September 2025. Prior to its release, the album was promoted by the singles "It's OK I'm OK", "2 Hands", and "Sports Car". The three peaked within the top 20 in the United Kingdom, while the former reached number 20 in the United States and topped the Hot Dance/Pop Songs chart. "Revolving Door" was released alongside the album on February 21, 2025, as its fourth single. Sony Music Italy sent it to Italian radio airplay on March 7, 2025.

== Composition ==
"Revolving Door" is three minutes long. It was written by McRae, Ryan Tedder, Grant Boutin, and Julia Michaels, while the former two produced it. Both played keyboards and performed the background vocals, while Tedder additionally played synthesizers. Boutin was also the song's programmer and engineer, the latter role alongside Rich & Rich and Bryce Bordone. Serban Ghenea and Dave Kutch served as the mixing engineer and mastering engineer, respectively.

Music critics have categorized "Revolving Door" as a pop and Jersey club ballad built over a dancehall beat. Nick Levine of NME compared its sound to the more experimental songs from In the Zone (2003) by Britney Spears. The lyrics of "Revolving Door" depict McRae coming back to the same person several times, although it always results in a toxic relationship. She mentions the desire of confronting someone for a "bad habit" but not being able to do so. The track ends frantically, with McRae pleading, "I'm supposed to be an adult, but fuck it, I need a minute", which Sam Franzini of The Line of Best Fit interpreted as "the realization part of the healing".

== Reception ==
In a ranking of the tracks from So Close to What, Billboard's Lyndsey Havens placed "Revolving Door" at number four and praised McRae's vocal performance, which she called a standout on the album. Rolling Stone included it on a list of the best songs of its release week and called it a "sleek, moody highlight". Lyndsay Zoladz of The New York Times believed that it contains a "more promising and vulnerable sound" than McRae's previous songs. The critic described the chorus as an "anxious heartbeat", which Clare Martin of Paste compared it to a "musical edging", citing a "fast beat that builds to a whole lot of nothing".

== Music video ==
The music video for "Revolving Door" premiered on McRae's YouTube channel on the same date as the album's release. Aerin Moreno directed it while Robbie Blue was in charge of the choreography. The video starts with McRae entering a white room and the direction focuses on her flexibility; Aaron Williams of Uproxx said that it prepared him for body horror from the film The Substance (2024), although he found it the only parallel. It follows McRae and a group of dancers in all-white outfits performing in a room with fifteen doors; each one represents a different track from So Close to What, according to the singer. After finalizing the choreography, she cries and repeats it, which according to Abbie Reynolds of Capital, represents "the feeling of being trapped in a never ending cycle".

== Live performances ==
McRae sang "Revolving Door" on The Tonight Show Starring Jimmy Fallon on March 5, 2025. She performed the song in a white box with a revolving floor along with two dancers, which was similar to the music video, according to Rolling Stone's Emily Zemler. "Revolving Door" was also performed during the 2025 MTV Video Music Awards in a medley along with "Sports Car", re-creating some dance moves from the music video. Joe Lynch of Billboard naming the best performance of the night.

== Charts ==
=== Weekly charts ===
Weekly chart performance for "Revolving Door"
Chart (2025−2026)	Peak position
Australia (ARIA)	13
Austria (Ö3 Austria Top 40)	39
Canada Hot 100 (Billboard)	13
Canada CHR/Top 40 (Billboard)	3
Canada Hot AC (Billboard)	27
Croatia International Airplay (Top lista)	79
Czech Republic Singles Digital (ČNS IFPI)	45
Denmark (Tracklisten)	37
Estonia Airplay (TopHit)	13
France (SNEP)	134
Germany (GfK)	76
Global 200 (Billboard)	20
Greece International (IFPI)	20
Ireland (IRMA)	9
Kazakhstan Airplay (TopHit)	11
Lebanon (Lebanese Top 20)	8
Lithuania (AGATA)	61
Lithuania Airplay (TopHit)	59
Mexico Anglo Airplay (Monitor Latino)	3
Netherlands (Single Top 100)	24
New Zealand (Recorded Music NZ)	11
Norway (VG-lista)	13
Portugal (AFP)	23
Singapore (RIAS)	20
Slovakia Singles Digital (ČNS IFPI)	41
Sweden (Sverigetopplistan)	31
Switzerland (Schweizer Hitparade)	37
UK Singles (Official Charts)	9
Uruguay Anglo Airplay (Monitor Latino)	8
US Billboard Hot 100	22
US Adult Pop Airplay (Billboard)	29
US Hot Dance/Pop Songs (Billboard)	1
US Pop Airplay (Billboard)	6
Venezuela Anglo Airplay (Monitor Latino)	6

=== Monthly charts ===
Monthly chart performance for "Revolving Door"
Chart (2025–2026)	Peak position
Estonia Airplay (TopHit)	18
Kazakhstan Airplay (TopHit)	14
Lithuania Airplay (TopHit)	83

=== Year-end charts ===
Year-end chart performance for "Revolving Door"
Chart (2025)	Position
Australia (ARIA)	56
Belgium (Ultratop 50 Flanders)	171
Canada (Canadian Hot 100)	62
Canada CHR/Top 40 (Billboard)	38
Canada Hot AC (Billboard)	57
Estonia Airplay (TopHit)	49
Global 200 (Billboard)	165
UK Singles (OCC)	74
US Billboard Hot 100	82
US Hot Dance/Pop Songs (Billboard)	2
US Pop Airplay (Billboard)	43

== Certifications ==
Certifications for "Revolving Door"
Region	Certification	Certified units/sales
Australia (ARIA)	2× Platinum	140,000^{‡}
Austria (IFPI Austria)	Gold	15,000^{‡}
Belgium (BRMA)	Gold	20,000^{‡}
Brazil (Pro-Música Brasil)	Platinum	40,000^{‡}
Canada (Music Canada)	2× Platinum	160,000^{‡}
Denmark (IFPI Danmark)	Gold	45,000^{‡}
France (SNEP)	Gold	100,000^{‡}
New Zealand (RMNZ)	Platinum	30,000^{‡}
Portugal (AFP)	Platinum	10,000^{‡}
United Kingdom (BPI)	Platinum	600,000^{‡}
United States (RIAA)	Platinum	1,000,000^{‡}
Streaming
Greece (IFPI Greece)	Gold	1,000,000^{†}
^{‡} Sales+streaming figures based on certification alone.^{†} Streaming-only figures based on certification alone.

== Release history ==
"Revolving Door" release history
Region	Date	Format	Label	Ref.
Italy	March 7, 2025	Radio airplay	Sony	
Various	April 18, 2025	Remix EP	RCA	
United States	June 17, 2025	Contemporary hit radio	RCA	
United States	September 12, 2025	4-inch vinyl	Sony	
