= I Used to Think I Could Fly =

Studio album by Tate McRae
- Released: May 27, 2022
- Studios: No Expectations (Los Angeles, California); Power Station (New York, New York)
- Genres: Pop; dance-pop; bedroom pop
- Length: 36:42
- Label: RCA
- Producers: Alexander 23; Blake Harnage; Blake Slatkin; Charlie Handsome; Charlie Puth; David Cook; Finneas; Greg Kurstin; Jackson Foote; Jasper Harris; KBeaZy; Kyle Stemberger; Louis Bell; Russell Chell; Styalz Fuego

Tate McRae chronology
Too Young to Be Sad (2021)	I Used to Think I Could Fly (2022)	Think Later (2023)

Singles from I Used to Think I Could Fly
- 1. "Feel Like Shit" Released: November 11, 2021; 2. "She's All I Wanna Be" Released: February 4, 2022; 3. "Chaotic" Released: March 25, 2022; 4. "What Would You Do?" Released: May 13, 2022

I Used to Think I Could Fly is the debut studio album by Canadian singer and dancer Tate McRae, released on May 27, 2022, through RCA Records. It was preceded by the singles "Feel Like Shit", "She's All I Wanna Be", "Chaotic" and "What Would You Do?". "Don't Come Back" also received an official music video. McRae embarked on a tour in support of the album in June 2022. Described as a pop, dance-pop, and bedroom pop record, I Used to Think I Could Fly was met with positive reviews from music critics, and saw commercial success. It entered the top 10 in various countries and debuted at number thirteen on the US Billboard 200.

== Background ==
McRae told NME in 2021 that she analysed the "structures" of albums like Frank Ocean's Blonde (2016), Billie Eilish's When We All Fall Asleep, Where Do We Go? (2019) and After Hours by the Weeknd (2020) as possible inspirations for the structure of her upcoming album. She explained to People in February 2022 that a number of her songs were "just [her] diary entries" and that when she has "ugly feelings" she writes them down.

McRae announced that she had finalized the track listing for the album and submitted it to her label on March 8, 2022, and she revealed the title and cover on April 1, 2022. After the album was originally set to have 12 tracks, McRae confirmed the inclusion of the track "What's Your Problem?" when the official track list was announced on April 11, 2022, bringing the total number of tracks up to 13.

== Critical reception ==
Professional ratings
Aggregate scores
Source	Rating
AnyDecentMusic?	6.9/10
Metacritic	75/100
Review scores
Source	Rating
AllMusic	4/5 stars
Clash	7/10
DIY	4/5 stars
The Independent	4/5 stars
The Line of Best Fit	7/10
Pitchfork	6.8/10
Rolling Stone	3/5 stars
The Telegraph	3/5 stars

I Used to Think I Could Fly received generally positive reviews from critics, praising the production, lyrical content, McRae's vocal performance and maturity in content. At Metacritic, which assigns a normalized rating out of 100 to reviews from mainstream critics, the album has an average score of 75 based on 9 reviews, indicating "generally favorable reviews".

Ims Taylor of DIY wrote that McRae "pulls out all the emotional stops" on the album, calling her "confiding her deepest feelings in us [...] comfortingly universal". Taylor further complimented McRae's "lush" vocals and concluded that her "arsenal of jagged pop weapons is extensive, and can be expertly wielded when she wants". John Amen wrote in The Line of Best Fit that "While McRae's previous outings may have been more complexly assembled, her new songs are more immediately accessible". He went on to conclude, "The new album is, in essence, McRae's first major step in forging a distinct pop presence". Writing for The Independent, Roisin O'Connor found there to be "angst aplenty" on the album, stating that McRae "trades in the R&B and pop-punk sounds that were prevalent in the Noughties" while "emulating the hard-hitting lyrical truths of her Gen-Z peers, Billie Eilish and Olivia Rodrigo". O'Connor felt that McRae "sings like she's falling apart, but the quality of the album suggests she's got it together".

Brady Bickner-Wood from Pitchfork wrote that "even when she's singing about self-loathing, the 18-year old pop star and dancer exudes a swagger. Her full-length debut proves she's capable of transcending online virality".

== Track listing ==
I Used to Think I Could Fly track listing
No.	Title	Writer(s)	Producer(s)	Length
1.	"?"	Tate McRae	David Cook	0:16
2.	"Don't Come Back"	McRae; Lavell Webb; Ryan Vojtesak; Eldra DeBarge; Etterlene DeBarge; William DeBarge; Cornell Haynes Jr.; Jason Epperson; Kaelyn Behr	Charlie Handsome; Styalz Fuego	2:32
3.	"I'm So Gone"	McRae; Kyle Stemberger; Nikolaos Grivellas; Keegan Bach	KBeaZy; Stemberger	2:26
4.	"What Would You Do?"	McRae; Alexander Glantz; Charlie Puth; Blake Slatkin	Alexander 23; Puth; Slatkin	2:46
5.	"Chaotic"	McRae; Victoria Zaro; Greg Kurstin	Kurstin	2:55
6.	"Hate Myself"	McRae; Zaro; Puth; Slatkin	Puth; Slatkin	2:53
7.	"What's Your Problem?"	McRae; Jeremy Dussolliet; Jackson Foote	KBeaZy; Foote	2:47
8.	"She's All I Wanna Be"	McRae; Kurstin	Kurstin	3:27
9.	"Boy X"	McRae; Glantz	Alexander 23	3:46
10.	"You're So Cool"	McRae; Billy Walsh; Ali Tamposi; Louis Bell; Omer Fedi	Bell; Cook^{[v]}	2:50
11.	"Feel Like Shit"	McRae; Zaro; Jacob Kasher Hindlin; Russell Chell	Jasper Harris; Chell	3:23
12.	"Go Away"	McRae; Blake Harnage	Harnage	3:33
13.	"I Still Say Goodnight"	McRae; Finneas O'Connell	Finneas; Cook^{[v]}	3:08
Total length:				36:42

=== Notes ===
- All track titles are stylized in lowercase.
- "?" is titled "Intro" on physical editions of the album.
- "What's Your Problem?" was not included on the original track list announcement and is not included on physical editions or digital pre-order uploads.
- "Don't Come Back" interpolates "Ride wit Me" (2001) performed by Nelly.

== Personnel ==
Musicians

- Tate McRae – lead vocals
- Alexander 23 – background vocals, drums, guitar (4, 9); synthesizer (4); bass, keyboards, percussion, programming (9)
- Greg Kurstin – bass, drums, keyboards, piano, synthesizer (5, 8); guitar (8)
- Sean Kennedy – guitar (9)
- David Cook – background vocals (13)

Technical

- Dave Kutch – mastering
- David Cook – mixing (1, 11), engineering (5, 8, 10, 11), engineering assistance (9, 12)
- Denis Kosiak – mixing (2)
- Jon Castelli – mixing (3, 4, 6)
- Mark Stent – mixing (5, 8)
- Clint Gibbs – mixing (6)
- Jeff Juliano – mixing (9, 11–13)
- Manny Marroquin – mixing (10)
- Henrique Andrade – engineering (2)
- James Keeley – engineering (2)
- Greg Kurstin – engineering (5, 8)
- Julian Burg – engineering (5, 8)
- Joey Raia – engineering (8)
- Daniel Cullen – engineering assistance (2)
- Ingmar Carlson – engineering assistance (3, 4, 6)
- Ryan Nasci – engineering assistance (3, 4, 6)
- Matt Wolach – engineering assistance (5, 8)
- Eric Kirkland – engineering assistance (9, 12)
- Chris Galland – engineering assistance (10)
- Jeremie Inhaber – engineering assistance (10)
- Robin Florent – engineering assistance (10)

== Charts ==
Chart performance for I Used to Think I Could Fly
Chart (2022)	Peak position
Australian Albums (ARIA)	10
Austrian Albums (Ö3 Austria)	22
Belgian Albums (Ultratop Flanders)	15
Belgian Albums (Ultratop Wallonia)	102
Canadian Albums (Billboard)	3
Czech Albums (ČNS IFPI)	40
Danish Albums (Hitlisten)	37
Dutch Albums (Album Top 100)	16
Finnish Albums (Suomen virallinen lista)	36
French Albums (SNEP)	174
German Albums (Offizielle Top 100)	44
Irish Albums (IRMA)	9
Lithuanian Albums (AGATA)	53
New Zealand Albums (RMNZ)	5
Norwegian Albums (VG-lista)	5
Scottish Albums (Official Charts)	7
Slovak Albums (ČNS IFPI)	67
Spanish Albums (Promusicae)	43
Swedish Albums (Sverigetopplistan)	28
Swiss Albums (Schweizer Hitparade)	39
UK Albums (Official Charts)	7
US Billboard 200	13

== Certifications ==
Certifications for I Used to Think I Could Fly
Region	Certification	Certified units/sales
Canada (Music Canada)	Platinum	80,000^{‡}
Denmark (IFPI Danmark)	Gold	10,000^{‡}
New Zealand (RMNZ)	Platinum	15,000^{‡}
Sweden (GLF)	Gold	15,000^{‡}
United Kingdom (BPI)	Gold	100,000^{‡}
United States (RIAA)	Gold	500,000^{‡}
^{‡} Sales+streaming figures based on certification alone.
