= Nobody's Girl (Tate McRae song) =

2025 single by Tate McRae

Single by Tate McRae

from the album So Close to What???
- Released: November 28, 2025
- Length: 2:48
- Label: RCA
- Songwriters: Tate McRae; Emile Haynie; Ryan Tedder; Amy Allen
- Producers: Haynie; Tedder

Tate McRae singles chronology
"Tit for Tat" (2025)	"Nobody's Girl" (2025)	"Housewife" (2026)

Music video
- "Nobody's Girl" on YouTube

"Nobody's Girl" is a song by Canadian singer Tate McRae from the deluxe edition of her third studio album So Close to What (2025). The song was written by McRae alongside Amy Allen, Emile Haynie and Ryan Tedder, with the latter of the two handling the production. It was released as a single to Italian radio on November 28, 2025.

== Content ==
The song revolves around Tate McRae grappling with the difficulties of balancing her career with her love life. She reflects on the end of a relationship in the bridge, with an optimistic attitude. It is speculated that the song is about her ex-boyfriend the Kid Laroi.

== Music video ==
The music video was directed by Thibaut Grevet and premiered on November 21, 2025. Filmed on a retro camera, the clip shows Tate McRae in a white lace outfit. Her image splits into a kaleidoscope of dancers from the French dance collective (LA)HORDE, who perform the choreography. She is also dressed as an angel with wings and wanders through an underground cement room. Later, she appears with glittery angel wings in a forest setting.

== Charts ==
=== Weekly charts ===
Weekly chart performance
Chart (2025–2026)	Peak position
Australia (ARIA)	19
Canada Hot 100 (Billboard)	13
Costa Rica Anglo Airplay (Monitor Latino)	12
Estonia Airplay (TopHit)	14
Germany Airplay (BVMI)	57
Global 200 (Billboard)	27
Greece International (IFPI)	46
Ireland (IRMA)	14
Latvia Airplay (LaIPA)	14
Lithuania Airplay (TopHit)	45
Netherlands (Single Top 100)	44
New Zealand (Recorded Music NZ)	21
Norway (VG-lista)	36
Peru Anglo Airplay (Monitor Latino)	14
Portugal (AFP)	51
Sweden (Sverigetopplistan)	50
Switzerland (Schweizer Hitparade)	49
UK Singles (Official Charts)	16
US Billboard Hot 100	29
Venezuela Airplay (Record Report)	30

=== Monthly charts ===
Monthly chart performance
Chart (2025–2026)	Peak position
Estonia Airplay (TopHit)	22
Lithuania Airplay (TopHit)	64

== Release history ==
Release dates and formats for "Nobody's Girl"
Region	Date	Format(s)	Label	Ref.
Italy	November 28, 2025	Radio airplay	Sony	
