= Chaotic (Tate McRae song) =

2022 single by Tate McRae

Single by Tate McRae

from the album I Used to Think I Could Fly
- Released: March 25, 2022
- Genre: Pop
- Length: 2:55
- Label: RCA
- Songwriters: Tate McRae; Greg Kurstin; Victoria Zaro
- Producer: Greg Kurstin

Tate McRae singles chronology
"She's All I Wanna Be" (2022)	"Chaotic" (2022)	"What Would You Do?" (2022)

"Chaotic" (stylized in all lowercase) is a song by Canadian singer Tate McRae, released on March 25, 2022, by RCA Records as the third single from her debut studio album I Used to Think I Could Fly, released on May 27, 2022. The song was produced by Greg Kurstin, and written by McRae, Kurstin and Victoria Zaro.

== Background and release ==
McRae first teased the song on TikTok on February 14, 2022. The song sparked a trend where users would juxtapose clips of themselves crying in private with other clips where they appear perfectly happy and content, suggesting projecting happiness outwardly while going through a lot internally, to correspond with the lyrics "You said it looks like I've been going through hell. How did you know, how could you tell?" She announced the release date of the song on March 14, 2022.

== Composition and lyrics ==
"Chaotic" is a piano ballad with strings. McRae has described the song as "the most personal song she's ever written", and notes that it discusses her fears. The song discusses growing pains and fears, and has been described as "a bluesy reflection on how hard it can be to change, to grow up, and leave behind old habits and old relationships".

== Critical reception ==
The song received positive reviews from critics, praising the lyrics, production and McRae's vocal performance. Caitlin White of Uproxx notes that the song sits comfortably within McRae's sad-streaked palette. Writing for Stereogum, Rachel Brodsky remarks, that the song is well-executed with a "lovely hook, smartly deployed strings, and some stylish distorted vocals around the edges of the chorus". The song has been praised for accurately capturing the pain and glum of growing up, and for McRae's emotional delivery. Chaotic has also been described as a "flawless pop song", while the production has been highlighted as dreamy and "adding to the dramatic and overwhelming feelings that the song embodies".

== Credits ==
Credits adapted from Tidal.

- Tate McRae – vocals, composer, lyricist
- Greg Kurstin – composer, lyricist, producer, engineer, bass, drums, keyboards, piano, synthesizer
- Victoria Zaro – composer, lyricist
- Dave Kutch – mastering engineer
- Mark Stent – mixing engineer
- Dave Cook – engineer
- Julian Burg – engineer
- Matt Wolach – assistant engineer

== Charts ==
Chart performance for "Chaotic"
Chart (2022)	Peak position
Australia (ARIA)	39
Canada Hot 100 (Billboard)	21
Denmark (Tracklisten)	35
Global 200 (Billboard)	73
Ireland (IRMA)	15
Netherlands (Single Top 100)	69
New Zealand Hot Singles (RMNZ)	1
Norway (VG-lista)	16
Sweden (Sverigetopplistan)	45
UK Singles (Official Charts)	36
US Billboard Hot 100	80

== Certifications ==
Certifications for "Chaotic"
Region	Certification	Certified units/sales
Canada (Music Canada)	Platinum	80,000^{‡}
United Kingdom (BPI)	Silver	200,000^{‡}
United States (RIAA)	Gold	500,000^{‡}
^{‡} Sales+streaming figures based on certification alone.

== Release history ==
Release dates and formats for "Chaotic"
Region	Date	Format(s)	Label	Ref.
Various	March 25, 2022	Digital download; streaming	RCA	
