= Feel Like Shit =

2021 single by Tate McRae

Single by Tate McRae

from the album I Used to Think I Could Fly
- Released: November 11, 2021
- Genre: Pop
- Length: 3:23
- Label: RCA
- Songwriters: Jacob Kasher Hindlin; Russel Chell; Tate McRae; Victoria Zaro
- Producers: Russel Chell; Jasper Harris

Tate McRae singles chronology
"That Way" (2021)	"Feel Like Shit" (2021)	"She's All I Wanna Be" (2022)

Music video
- "Feel Like Shit" on YouTube

"Feel Like Shit" (stylized in all lowercase) is a song by Canadian singer Tate McRae, released on November 11, 2021, by RCA Records as the lead single from her debut studio album I Used to Think I Could Fly (2022). The song was produced by Russell Chell and Jasper Harris, and written by McRae, Jacob Kasher Hindlin, Russell Chell and Victoria Zaro.

== Background and release ==
McRae first teased the song via a TikTok on September 30, 2021, and continued to tease the song throughout the month of October, promising to release the song after 20,000 people pre-saved the single. She announced the release date on November 3, 2021. In the description for the music video, McRae remarked, "i wrote this song about a very personal experience and then michelle dawley and i brought it to life in this music video. i can't explain how excited i am for you all to see this video and experience the ups and downs of a relationship in 3 minutes".

== Inspiration ==
In a livestream in 2023, McRae said: "Feel Like Shit was written about somebody that I went through a breakup with in 2021 and I was really sad, but I didn't really know how to write about it. I had a really hard time writing about that relationship actually because I loved him so much".

== Critical reception ==
The song received positive reviews from critics, praising the lyrics and vocal performance. Writing for ET Canada, Mikael Melo described the song and music video as McRae's best work to date, noting that the song showcases McRae's "mature and gifted voice" while the music video adds "an incredible layer to this song, with incredible story telling and thought provoking choreography". Larisha Paul of The Fader remarked that "McRae falls into the track like Alice in Wonderland, letting her guard down to open up to doors for that uncomplicated and raw delivery throughout". Sam Murphy of music magazine The Interns called McRae "the dark princess of pop", noting that she has perfected a moody formula and the song hits exactly where it should. Carolyn Droke of Uproxx described the song as an "earnest solo tune about the ups and downs of a relationship". Elise Shafer of Variety stated that the song is "raw and vulnerable, with McRae's powerful voice soaring over an instrumental led by drums and keys".

== Music video ==
The music video was described in the press release for the song as McRae's most choreographed video to date and features McRae performing an intense and emotional contemporary routine alongside actor and dancer Mason Cutler, both portraying servers at a restaurant. The choreography depicts the emotional turmoil of heartbreak showcasing McRae and Cutler continually being drawn back to each other in a seemingly fraught relationship, despite their attempts to let go. Ellise Shafer of Variety remarked that "the push and pull of the choreography fittingly matches the song's message of letting a loved one go before you're truly ready". As McRae and Cutler dance across the restaurant, the video reaches a climax when Cutler begins smashing plates, and the pair continue dancing intertwined movements over the broken ceramic. The video concludes with Cutler finally walking away, leaving McRae hunched over in emotional distress. McRae remarked about the video, "This is the first time that I am fully dancing in one of my own music videos, therefore I feel like I was really able to tell the story of the aftermath of a breakup through what I know best; movement".

== Credits ==
Credits adapted from Tidal and YouTube.

=== Song ===
- Tate McRae – vocals, composer, lyricist
- Jacob Kasher Hindlin – composer, lyricist
- Jasper Harris – producer
- Russell Chell – composer, lyricist, producer
- Dave Kutch – mastering engineer
- Dave Cook – mixing engineer, engineer, recording engineer
- Jeff Juliano – mixing engineer

=== Music video ===
- Mason Cutler – co-star
- Sam Sulam – director
- Maximilian Kurzwell – executive producer
- Abi Perl – producer
- AB Films – production
- Jenna Marsh – creative director
- Art Brainard – assistant director
- David Okolo – director of photography
- Daniel Worlock – AC
- Natalie Abraham – second AC
- Nicky Keros – MM + editor
- Niels Lindelien – Trinity op
- Michelle Dawley – creative lead, choreographer
- Noelle Marsh – choreographer
- Jason Glover – body double
- Alexah Acuna – production designer
- Parhom Jamshidi – art director
- Per Alexah – art assistant
- Eric Heresy – set dresser
- Angela Rojas – art assistant
- Katie Qian – stylist
- Julianne Sevilla – stylist assistant
- Ryan Richman – Tate McRae hair
- Gilbert Soliz – Tate McRae make-up
- Alexa Hernandez – Mason Cutler groomer
- Justin Smith – CCO
- Milan Nikolik – VFX
- Gregory Reese – color grade
- Michael Tanji – beauty post
- Jordan Marks – title design
- Sabrina Rivera – video commissioner

== Charts ==
Chart performance for "Feel Like Shit"
Chart (2021–2022)	Peak position
Australia (ARIA)	54
Canada Hot 100 (Billboard)	35
Canada CHR/Top 40 (Billboard)	27
Canada Hot AC (Billboard)	21
Global 200 (Billboard)	105
Ireland (IRMA)	29
Netherlands (Single Top 100)	70
New Zealand Hot Singles (RMNZ)	11
Norway (VG-lista)	21
Portugal (AFP)	176
South Africa (RISA)	35
Sweden (Sverigetopplistan)	90
Switzerland (Schweizer Hitparade)	72
UK Singles (OCC)	52
US Bubbling Under Hot 100 (Billboard)	8

== Certifications ==
Certifications for "Feel Like Shit"
Region	Certification	Certified units/sales
Brazil (Pro-Música Brasil)	Gold	20,000^{‡}
Canada (Music Canada)	Platinum	80,000^{‡}
Denmark (IFPI Danmark)	Gold	45,000^{‡}
New Zealand (RMNZ)	Gold	15,000^{‡}
United Kingdom (BPI)	Silver	200,000^{‡}
United States (RIAA)	Platinum	1,000,000^{‡}
^{‡} Sales+streaming figures based on certification alone.

== Release history ==
Release dates and formats for "Feel Like Shit"
Region	Date	Format(s)	Label	Ref.
Various	November 11, 2021	Digital download; streaming	RCA	
