= Anything but Love (Tate McRae song) =

2025 song by Tate McRae

Song by Tate McRae

from the album So Close to What???
- Released: November 21, 2025
- Length: 2:27
- Label: RCA
- Songwriters: Tate McRae; Grant Boutin; Julia Michaels
- Producer: Boutin

"Anything but Love" is a song by Canadian singer Tate McRae, released on November 28, 2025, from the deluxe edition of her third studio album, So Close to What (2025). She wrote the song with its producer Grant Boutin and Julia Michaels.

== Background and content ==
Tate McRae reportedly wrote the song before she was romantically involved with Australian rapper and singer The Kid Laroi. In the song, she takes aim at a former partner, singing about how she, her friends, and her family hate him.

== Charts ==
=== Weekly charts ===
Chart performance
| Chart (2025) | Peak position |
|---|---|
| Australia (ARIA) | 31 |
| Canada Hot 100 (Billboard) | 22 |
| Global 200 (Billboard) | 62 |
| Greece International (IFPI) | 59 |
| Ireland (IRMA) | 19 |
| Lithuania Airplay (TopHit) | 64 |
| New Zealand (Recorded Music NZ) | 25 |
| Norway (VG-lista) | 99 |
| Portugal (AFP) | 63 |
| Sweden Heatseeker (Sverigetopplistan) | 9 |
| UK Singles (Official Charts) | 25 |
| US Billboard Hot 100 | 44 |

=== Monthly charts ===
Monthly chart performance
| Chart (2025) | Peak position |
|---|---|
| Lithuania Airplay (TopHit) | 72 |
