= 2 Hands =

2024 song by Tate McRae

Single by Tate McRae

from the album So Close to What
- Released: November 14, 2024
- Genre: Electropop; R&B
- Length: 3:01
- Label: RCA
- Songwriters: Tate McRae; Amy Allen; Ryan Tedder; Peter Rycroft
- Producers: Tedder; Lostboy

Tate McRae singles chronology
| "It's OK I'm OK" (2024) | "2 Hands" (2024) | "Sports Car" (2025) |

Music video
- "2 Hands" on YouTube

"2 Hands" is a song by Canadian singer Tate McRae. It was written by Ryan Tedder, Amy Allen and Peter Rycroft, alongside McRae herself, with production by Tedder and Rycroft, and released on November 14, 2024, by RCA Records as the second single from her third studio album, So Close to What (2025). "2 Hands" is an electropop and R&B song, backed by strong bass and synthesizers, with lyrics describing McRae craving physical attention from her lover.

== Background and composition ==
On September 12, 2024, McRae released the lead single "It's OK I'm OK"; the song was a commercial success globally. After the single's success, she announced the follow up "2 Hands" with a release date of November 14, 2024. Musically, "2 Hands" is an electropop and R&B song with Middle Eastern beats and a subtle synth-backing. McRae stated in a press release for the single:

"2 hands" shows a different side of me than what people are used to. The song captures the feeling of falling in love and how sometimes just being close to someone is all you really need. A genuine connection goes beyond needing constant reassurance or fancy things, simply being together is what matters.

== Critical reception ==
Rolling Stone's Brittany Spanos described "2 Hands" as an "electropop love song", whereas Aaron Williams of Uproxx cited it as a "lusty song" that keeps the vibe of the first single "It's OK I'm OK".

== Commercial performance ==
Commercially, "2 Hands" debuted at number eight on the UK Singles Chart, number fourteen in Australia and forty-one on the US Billboard Hot 100 and number 22 on the Canadian Hot 100.

== Music video ==
The motorsport themed video directed by Bradley & Pablo focuses on McRae, who goes to the gas station to get a carton of milk after running out. Her male backup dancers are seen wearing balaclavas, each wearing a black and orange racing suit. They are also wearing these same racing suits in the cover art for the single along with McRae. The video transitions to Mcrae also donning a black and orange racing suit, while driving to the gas station, multiple cheeky subtitles, along with sexual themes are seen throughout the video, which ends with McRae doing the Sean Bankhead choreography with the male dancers as they dance seductively in their racing suits at the gas station.

== Charts ==
=== Weekly charts ===
Weekly chart performance for "2 Hands"
| Chart (2024–2025) | Peak position |
|---|---|
| Australia (ARIA) | 14 |
| Canada Hot 100 (Billboard) | 22 |
| Croatia International Airplay (Top lista) | 30 |
| Estonia Airplay (TopHit) | 21 |
| Global 200 (Billboard) | 32 |
| Greece International (IFPI) | 81 |
| Ireland (IRMA) | 6 |
| Japan Hot Overseas (Billboard Japan) | 11 |
| Latvia Airplay (LaIPA) | 12 |
| Lithuania Airplay (TopHit) | 9 |
| Netherlands (Dutch Top 40) | 40 |
| Netherlands (Single Top 100) | 49 |
| New Zealand (Recorded Music NZ) | 16 |
| Norway (VG-lista) | 21 |
| Poland (Polish Airplay Top 100) | 99 |
| Portugal (AFP) | 97 |
| Singapore (RIAS) | 23 |
| Slovakia Airplay (ČNS IFPI) | 35 |
| Sweden (Sverigetopplistan) | 54 |
| Switzerland (Schweizer Hitparade) | 41 |
| UK Singles (Official Charts) | 8 |
| US Billboard Hot 100 | 41 |

=== Monthly charts ===
Monthly chart performance for "2 Hands"
| Chart (2024) | Peak position |
|---|---|
| Estonia Airplay (TopHit) | 22 |
| Lithuania Airplay (TopHit) | 38 |

== Certifications ==
Certifications for "2 Hands"
| Region | Certification | Certified units/sales |
|---|---|---|
| Brazil (Pro-Música Brasil) | Gold | 20,000^{‡} |
| Canada (Music Canada) | Platinum | 80,000^{‡} |
| New Zealand (RMNZ) | Gold | 15,000^{‡} |
| United Kingdom (BPI) | Silver | 200,000^{‡} |
| United States (RIAA) | Gold | 500,000^{‡} |
^{‡} Sales+streaming figures based on certification alone.
