= So Close to What =

2025 album by Tate McRae

- Standard cover

Studio album by Tate McRae
- Released: February 21, 2025
- Recorded: January 2024 – January 2025
- Genres: Pop; dance-pop; power pop; R&B
- Length: 42:30
- Label: RCA
- Producers: Rob Bisel; Grant Boutin; Emile Haynie; Ilya; Lostboy; Blake Slatkin; Tyler Spry; Ryan Tedder

Tate McRae chronology
Think Later (2023)	So Close to What (2025)

Singles from So Close to What
- 1. "It's OK I'm OK" Released: September 12, 2024; 2. "2 Hands" Released: November 14, 2024; 3. "Sports Car" Released: January 24, 2025; 4. "Revolving Door" Released: March 7, 2025

Singles from So Close to What???
- 1. "Nobody's Girl" Released: November 28, 2025

So Close to What is the third studio album by the Canadian singer Tate McRae, released on February 21, 2025, through RCA Records. She co-wrote it with several collaborators, including the producers Ryan Tedder, Blake Slatkin, Lostboy, Emile Haynie, Ilya, and Rob Bisel. Musically, So Close to What is a pop, dance-pop, power pop, and R&B record.

The album was preceded by the singles "It's OK I'm OK", "2 Hands", and "Sports Car", while "Revolving Door" was released alongside it. A deluxe edition titled So Close to What??? was released on November 21, 2025, featuring the US Billboard Hot 100 top-five single "Tit for Tat".

Upon its release, So Close to What was met with generally positive reviews. It topped the record charts in Australia, Austria, Canada, Flanders, Ireland, the Netherlands, New Zealand, Norway, Switzerland, and the United States. It marked her first album to debut at number one on the US Billboard 200. To promote the album, McRae embarked on the Miss Possessive Tour, the first arena tour of her career.

== Background and release ==
After releasing her second studio album, Think Later (2023), McRae embarked on its supporting concert tour. The album produced "Greedy" (2023), which was one of her highest-charting singles. Shortly following the release, McRae was reported to have returned to the recording studio on January 23, 2024. In March 2024, McRae confirmed that she had returned to the studio and was "writing and seeing what first comes to mind right now, especially since it's so quickly after my album just dropped". As the first leg of her 2024 Think Later World Tour came to a close in August 2024, the singer further confirmed that she had been working on her upcoming album alongside touring.

On November 14, 2024, McRae announced the release of her third studio album through social media. According to a press release, So Close to What is set to capture "the journey of growing up when the road ahead feels infinite". So Close to What offers an "introspective exploration of self-discovery, love, and searching for balance" in uncertain times. On January 16, a version of the album intended for its physical release leaked online, which spurred McRae to write two extra songs for the album. The final track listing was eventually revealed through her Instagram account on February 12, 2025. The album was released on February 21, 2025. A deluxe edition of the album was released on November 21, 2025.

== Composition ==
So Close to What is described as a pop, dance-pop, power pop, and R&B record.

== Artwork and title ==
In the January 2026 cover story of Rolling Stone, McRae explained her decision to title the album So Close to What, stating that it "reflected how she felt amid her burgeoning fame." She further explained the deluxe's title expanded upon those feelings, revealing: "The intensity feels ramped up. It was crisis mode for a little bit — more painful than the album. And I haven't gotten any further in my answer to my question 'So close to what?' I'm feeling it more intensely now. Nothing has been solved."

The artwork for So Close to What??? was photographed in October 2025. Ludovic de Saint Sernin and Ignacio Muñoz acted as creative directors for the shoot. Such looks included a beach-styled sarong and a beaded minidress.

== Promotion ==
In support of the album, the singer embarked on the Miss Possessive Tour, which spanned 83 dates. During the Think Later World Tour, McRae previously played three unreleased songs off the album at a pop-up event in Sydney.

=== Singles ===
"It's OK I'm OK" was released as the album's lead single on September 12, 2024. The song debuted at number 20 on the US Billboard Hot 100 chart, marking McRae's highest debuting single at the time. The song received positive reviews and was released alongside a music video directed by Hannah Lux Davis. Various remixes of the song were released, alongside a live performance version from her performance at Madison Square Garden. The song went on to be the first inaugural number one on the Billboard US Hot Dance/Pop Songs chart.

"2 Hands" was released as the album's second single on November 14, 2024, alongside a motorsport-themed music video. The song debuted and peaked at number 41 on the Hot 100 and number 22 on the Canadian Hot 100. The third single, "Sports Car", was released on January 24, 2025. The song received positive reviews and debuted at number 21 on the Hot 100. "Revolving Door" was released as the fourth single alongside the album's release on February 21, 2025. A music video for the song premiered on the same date. "Nobody's Girl" impacted Italian radio on November 28, 2025, through Sony Music Italy, as a single from the deluxe edition.

== Critical reception ==
Professional ratings
Aggregate scores
Source	Rating
AnyDecentMusic?	6.7/10
Metacritic	74/100
Review scores
Source	Rating
AllMusic	4.5/5 stars
Clash	8/10
NME	4/5 stars
Paste	4.0/10
Rolling Stone	3.5/5 stars
The Telegraph	4/5 stars
The Times	3/5 stars
Pitchfork	6.0/10

So Close to What garnered a generally positive reception. On Metacritic, which assigns a normalized score out of 100 to ratings from mainstream publications, the album received a weighted mean score of 74 based on twelve reviews, indicating "generally favorable". The sound of So Close to What was compared favourably to that of 2000s pop artists Britney Spears and the Pussycat Dolls. In a four-star review, Shannon Garner of Clash praised McRae's "ability to blend introspective vulnerability with infectious pop sensibilities". In a three-star review, Will Hodgkinson of The Times described the album as "serviceable but unremarkable pop". In a negative review, Clare Martin of Paste described the album as lacking in energy, unmemorable, and "with a few exceptions... decidedly mid".

=== Year-end lists ===
Year-end lists
Publication	List	Rank	Ref.
Rolling Stone	The 100 Best Albums of 2025	58	
Variety	Thania Garcia's Top 10 Best Albums of 2025	8	
Variety	Steven J. Horowitz's Top 10 Best Albums of 2025	10	

== Commercial performance ==
In Canada, So Close to What debuted atop the Billboard Canadian Albums chart with 20,000 album-equivalent units. The album also debuted atop the Billboard 200 in the United States, with first-week sales of 177,000 album-equivalent units (consisting of 137.30 million on-demand streams and 71,000 pure album sales). This marks McRae's highest sales and streaming week across all her studio projects as well as her first number one album on both the Billboard Canadian Albums chart and Billboard 200. On October 6, 2025, So Close to What received a Platinum certification in the United States by the Recording Industry Association of America (RIAA), for accumulating sales of 1 million album-equivalent units in the country.

== Track listing ==
So Close to What standard digital edition track listing
No.	Title	Writer(s)	Producer(s)	Length
1.	"Miss Possessive"	Tate McRae; Ryan Tedder; Blake Slatkin; Amy Allen	Tedder; Slatkin	2:19
2.	"2 Hands"	McRae; Tedder; Peter Rycroft; Allen	Tedder; Lostboy	3:02
3.	"Revolving Door"	McRae; Tedder; Grant Boutin; Julia Michaels	Tedder; Boutin (Note: In addition to being credited as a producer, Grant Boutin is also credited as a vocal producer.)	3:00
4.	"Bloodonmyhands" (featuring Flo Milli)	McRae; Boutin; Tedder; Tamia Carter	Boutin	2:42
5.	"Dear God"	McRae; Tedder; Boutin; Michaels	Tedder; Boutin (Note: In addition to being credited as a producer, Grant Boutin is also credited as a vocal producer and additional producer.)	2:51
6.	"Purple Lace Bra"	McRae; Emile Haynie; Allen	Haynie	3:11
7.	"Sports Car"	McRae; Tedder; Boutin; Michaels	Tedder; Boutin	2:45
8.	"Signs"	McRae; Rycroft; Allen	Lostboy	2:53
9.	"I Know Love" (featuring the Kid Laroi)	McRae; Tedder; Tyler Spry; Michaels; Charlton Howard; Billy Walsh	Tedder; Spry; Dopamine^{[a]}	2:36
10.	"Like I Do"	McRae; Boutin	Boutin	3:02
11.	"It's OK I'm OK"	McRae; Tedder; Savan Kotecha; Ilya Salmanzadeh	Ilya; Tedder^{[a]}	2:36
12.	"No I'm Not in Love"	McRae; Tedder; Rycroft; Allen	Tedder; Lostboy	2:50
13.	"Means I Care"	McRae; Allen; Steven Michael Marsden; Robert Clark Bisel	Tedder; Rob Bisel	2:55
14.	"Greenlight"	McRae; Boutin	Boutin	2:45
15.	"Nostalgia"	McRae; Boutin; Allen	Boutin	3:03
Total length:				42:34

So Close to What??? deluxe edition track listing
No.	Title	Writer(s)	Producer(s)	Length
1.	"Trying on Shoes"	McRae; Haynie; Boutin; Allen	Haynie^{[v]}; Boutin^{[v]}	3:02
2.	"Anything but Love"	McRae; Boutin; Michaels	Boutin	2:27
3.	"Nobody's Girl"	McRae; Haynie; Tedder; Allen	Haynie; Tedder^{[a]}	2:48
4.	"Horseshoe"	McRae; Boutin; Haynie; Allen	Haynie; Boutin^{[v]}	3:01
5.	"Tit for Tat"	McRae; Tedder; Boutin; Michaels	Tedder; Boutin^{[v]}	2:57
6.	"Miss Possessive"	McRae; Allen; Tedder; Slatkin	Tedder; Slatkin	2:19
7.	"Revolving Door"	McRae; Michaels; Tedder; Boutin	Tedder; Boutin	3:00
8.	"Bloodonmyhands" (featuring Flo Milli)	McRae; Carter; Tedder; Boutin	Boutin	2:42
9.	"Dear God"	McRae; Michaels; Tedder; Boutin	Tedder; Boutin	2:51
10.	"Purple Lace Bra"	McRae; Allen; Haynie	Haynie	3:11
11.	"Sports Car"	McRae; Michaels; Tedder; Boutin	Tedder; Boutin	2:45
12.	"Signs"	McRae; Allen; Rycroft	Lostboy	2:53
13.	"I Know Love" (featuring the Kid Laroi)	McRae; Howard; Michaels; Walsh; Tedder; Spry	Tedder; Spry; Dopamine^{[a]}	2:36
14.	"Like I Do"	McRae; Boutin	Boutin	3:02
15.	"It's OK I'm OK"	McRae; Kotecha; Salmanzadeh; Tedder	Ilya; Tedder^{[a]}	2:36
16.	"No I'm Not in Love"	McRae; Allen; Tedder; Rycroft	Tedder; Lostboy	2:50
17.	"Means I Care"	McRae; Allen; Bisel; Marsden	Tedder; Bisel	2:55
18.	"Greenlight"	McRae; Boutin	Boutin	2:45
19.	"2 Hands"	McRae; Allen; Tedder; Rycroft	Tedder; Lostboy	3:02
20.	"Siren Sounds" (bonus)	McRae; Ari Starace; Brittany Amaradio	Y2K; Thomas LaRosa	3:03
21.	"Nostalgia"	McRae; Allen; Boutin	Boutin	3:03
Total length:				59:48

=== Notes ===
- ^{^[a]} denotes an additional producer.
- ^{^[v]} denotes a vocal producer.
- All So Close to What titles are stylized in sentence case, with the exception of "Bloodonmyhands", which is stylized in letter case; additional titles on So Close to What??? are stylized in all caps.
- Additional editions were released to digital services alongside the standard edition with altered track listings:
  - 16-track edition: "2 Hands" is listed as the fourteenth track, with "Siren Sounds" added as the fifteenth track, and the remaining songs listed in succession order to the standard digital edition.
  - 11-track edition: "Bloodonmyhands", "I Know Love", "Like I Do", "Means I Care", and "Siren Sounds" are omitted; the remaining songs are listed in order matching the 16-track edition.
- A 21-track deluxe digital store edition includes SiriusXM live versions of "Sports Car", "It's OK I'm OK", and "Greenlight" as bonus tracks, following after the 18-track edition listing.
- Physical editions of the album feature an altered track listing of 13 tracks. "Bloodonmyhands", "I Know Love", "Like I Do" and "Means I Care" are omitted. "Signs" and "Revolving Door" are listed as tracks five and seven, respectively, with bonus tracks "Better than I Was" and "Call My Bluff" listed as tracks eleven and twelve, respectively. The rest of the songs remain in their original order.
- The Japanese CD edition features "It's OK I'm OK" (live at Madison Square Garden) as a bonus track.

== Personnel ==
=== Musicians ===
- Tate McRae – lead vocals
- Ryan Tedder – programming (tracks 1, 2, 5, 7, 11–13), background vocals (1, 3, 5, 12, 13), synthesizer (1, 3, 12); drums, guitar (1); keyboards (3, 7, 12, 13); arrangement, percussion (11)
- Blake Slatkin – guitar, programming, synthesizer (track 1)
- Lostboy – programming (tracks 2, 8, 12); keyboards, synthesizer (8, 12)
- Grant Boutin – background vocals, keyboards, programming, synthesizer, synthbass (tracks 3, 5, 7, 14, 15); guitar (7, 14, 15)
- Ilya – arrangement, background vocals, bass, drums, keyboards, piano, programming (track 11)
- Zach Fenske – guitar (track 11)
- Darion Ja'Von Dean – programming (track 11)
- Phillip Lewis – programming (track 11)
- Rob Bisel – keyboards, programming (track 13)

=== Technical ===
- Dave Kutch – mastering
- Serban Ghenea – mixing (tracks 1–3, 5, 7, 11)
- Manny Marroquin – mixing (tracks 4, 6, 10, 15)
- Tom Norris – mixing (tracks 8, 12, 14)
- Jon Castelli – mixing (track 9)
- Rob Bisel – mixing (track 13)
- Rich Rich – engineering (tracks 1–3, 5, 7, 8, 11–13)
- Blake Slatkin – engineering (track 1)
- Bryce Bordone – engineering (tracks 1, 3, 5, 7), engineering assistance (2, 11)
- Grant Boutin – engineering (tracks 3, 5, 7, 14, 15)
- Melvin Godfrey – engineering (tracks 6, 11)
- Silas Wong – engineering (tracks 6, 11)
- Joe Henderson – engineering (track 6)
- Brad Lauchert – engineering (track 9)
- Sam Holland – engineering (track 11)
- Anthony Vilchis – mixing assistance (tracks 4, 6, 10, 15)
- Trey Station – mixing assistance (tracks 4, 6, 10, 15)

== Charts ==
=== So Close to What ===
==== Weekly charts ====
Weekly chart performance
Chart (2025–2026)	Peak position
Australian Albums (ARIA)	1
Austrian Albums (Ö3 Austria)	1
Belgian Albums (Ultratop Flanders)	1
Belgian Albums (Ultratop Wallonia)	2
Canadian Albums (Billboard)	1
Croatian International Albums (HDU)	16
Czech Albums (ČNS IFPI)	4
Danish Albums (Hitlisten)	2
Dutch Albums (Album Top 100)	1
Finnish Albums (Suomen virallinen lista)	5
French Albums (SNEP)	4
German Albums (Offizielle Top 100)	2
Greek Albums (IFPI)	59
Hungarian Albums (MAHASZ)	2
Icelandic Albums (Tónlistinn)	8
Irish Albums (Official Charts)	1
Italian Albums (FIMI)	24
Japanese Digital Albums (Oricon)	46
Japanese Hot Albums (Billboard Japan)	91
Lithuanian Albums (AGATA)	6
New Zealand Albums (RMNZ)	1
Nigerian Albums (TurnTable)	76
Norwegian Albums (VG-lista)	1
Polish Albums (ZPAV)	4
Portuguese Albums (AFP)	1
Scottish Albums (Official Charts)	2
Slovak Albums (ČNS IFPI)	6
Spanish Albums (Promusicae)	3
Swedish Albums (Sverigetopplistan)	2
Swiss Albums (Schweizer Hitparade)	1
UK Albums (Official Charts)	2
US Billboard 200	1

==== Year-end charts ====
2025 year-end chart performance
Chart (2025)	Position
Australian Albums (ARIA)	5
Austrian Albums (Ö3 Austria)	5
Belgian Albums (Ultratop Flanders)	6
Belgian Albums (Ultratop Wallonia)	43
Canadian Albums (Billboard)	17
Danish Albums (Hitlisten)	11
Dutch Albums (Album Top 100)	9
French Albums (SNEP)	60
German Albums (Offizielle Top 100)	20
Global Albums (IFPI)	13
Hungarian Albums (MAHASZ)	25
Icelandic Albums (Tónlistinn)	57
New Zealand Albums (RMNZ)	7
Polish Albums (ZPAV)	68
Spanish Albums (PROMUSICAE)	58
Swedish Albums (Sverigetopplistan)	20
Swiss Albums (Schweizer Hitparade)	9
UK Albums (Official Charts)	15
US Billboard 200	23

=== So Close to What??? ===
Weekly chart performance
Chart (2025–2026)	Peak position
Czech Albums (ČNS IFPI)	12
Finnish Albums (Suomen virallinen lista)	40
Greek Albums (IFPI)	89
Icelandic Albums (Tónlistinn)	37
Italian Albums (FIMI)	52
Lithuanian Albums (AGATA)	36
Norwegian Albums (IFPI Norge)	4
Slovak Albums (ČNS IFPI)	10

== Certifications ==
Certifications
Region	Certification	Certified units/sales
Australia (ARIA)	Platinum	70,000^{‡}
Austria (IFPI Austria)	Gold	7,500^{‡}
Brazil (Pro-Música Brasil)	Platinum	40,000^{‡}
Canada (Music Canada)	3× Platinum	240,000^{‡}
Denmark (IFPI Danmark)	Platinum	20,000^{‡}
France (SNEP)	Platinum	100,000^{‡}
Germany (BVMI)	Gold	75,000^{‡}
Hungary (MAHASZ)	Platinum	4,000^{‡}
Italy (FIMI)	Gold	25,000^{‡}
Netherlands (NVPI)	Gold	18,600^{‡}
New Zealand (RMNZ)	2× Platinum	30,000^{‡}
Poland (ZPAV)	Gold	15,000^{‡}
Portugal (AFP)	Platinum	7,000^{‡}
Spain (Promusicae)	Gold	20,000^{‡}
Switzerland (IFPI Switzerland)	Gold	10,000^{‡}
United Kingdom (BPI)	Platinum	300,000^{‡}
United States (RIAA)	Platinum	1,000,000^{‡}
^{‡} Sales+streaming figures based on certification alone.

== Release history ==
Release history
Date	Format(s)	Edition	Label	Ref.
February 21, 2025	Cassette; CD; digital download; streaming; vinyl	Standard	RCA	
November 21, 2025	Digital download; streaming	Deluxe	RCA	
March 13, 2026	CD; vinyl	Deluxe	RCA	
