= She's All I Wanna Be =

2022 single by Tate McRae

Single by Tate McRae

from the album I Used to Think I Could Fly
- Released: February 4, 2022
- Genre: Pop rock; alt-pop; pop-punk
- Length: 3:26
- Label: RCA
- Songwriters: Tate McRae; Greg Kurstin
- Producer: Greg Kurstin

Tate McRae singles chronology
"Feel Like Shit" (2021)	"She's All I Wanna Be" (2022)	"Chaotic" (2022)

Music video
- "She's All I Wanna Be" on YouTube

"She's All I Wanna Be" (stylized in all lowercase) is a song by Canadian singer Tate McRae. It was released on February 4, 2022, by RCA Records as the second single from her debut studio album I Used to Think I Could Fly. Written alongside producer Greg Kurstin, the song is a pop rock, alt-pop, and pop-punk song.

Despite not being the lead single, it became the most successful single from the album, entering the top 40 in several countries' charts.

== Background and release ==
McRae launched a TikTok campaign for the song which involved teasing it in multiple videos beginning on December 11, 2021 till its release in February. She also made duets with multiple videos of other TikTok users to the song, and showcased part of the choreography for the official music video in a TikTok which attracted over 5 million views. She announced the release date on March 28, 2022, and noted that she went through 29 different mixes for the song.

== Composition and lyrics ==
"She's All I Wanna Be" is an up-tempo pop rock, alt-pop, and pop-punk song with elements of synth-pop. The song describes feelings of jealousy towards a woman who seems to have it all, including the interest of McRae's significant other, who attempts to convince McRae that the woman poses no threat. Rachel Brodsky of Stereogum remarks that the song addresses "everyday gaslighting by a love interest who tells you their perfect-seeming female bestie is nothing to worry about". McRae has stated that the song was inspired by feelings of envy and self-loathing brought about by scrolling through social media. She also notes that song was originally written as a ballad, and was later reworked to "give it some upbeat punk energy". Additionally, the original demo vocals recorded for the ballad version were retained in the final released track.

== Critical reception ==
The song received widespread critical acclaim. Writing for Uproxx Caitlin White wrote that "even though the song is just ostensibly just as sad as plenty of Tate's other hits, it gets a pop-punk guitar, some glittering synths, and heavy percussion to elevate it from sad girl anthem into actual anthem". Carolyn Droke of Uproxx also notes that the song solidifies McRae's pop star status. Jon Caramanica of The New York Times remarks that McRae's "dry, wiry voice is well suited to the convincingly mopey and skittish punk-pop thumper about envy". Notion notes that McRae showcases her moving storytelling abilities on the track.

== Music video ==
The music video for the song was released on February 11, 2022, and is inspired by the film A Chorus Line based on the 1975 stage production of the same name. The creative concept for the video was done by McRae and Michelle Dawley. The video features McRae and a group of dancers competing for a role at an audition, with McRae fixating on dancer Bailey Sok, as her main competition. The two battle throughout the audition, making it to the final cut, but ultimately lose out after forgetting their competition and dancing together as friends – which was against the rules. It shows how the other girl is still a good person, and McRae's friend, despite many modern stereotypes. Caitlin White of Uproxx remarks that McRae and her rival, along with a colorful ensemble of other dancers, face off on the stage, dancing their way through choreography that mimics the song's chaotic energy.

== Chart performance ==
The song debuted in the top ten in Ireland, Singapore and Norway, entering just outside the top ten at 11 in Canada. The song also debuted in the top 40 in Australia, Austria, Belgium, Denmark, Sweden, South Africa, New Zealand and the UK. In the US, the song debuted at 52, becoming McRae's highest debut, at the time and fourth charting song.

== Live performances ==
The song was performed live from Los Angeles on February 24, 2022, for 'SetTheStage', a brand campaign with Sony. On June 12, 2022, it was performed live at Capital's Summertime Ball in London. In November 2022, McRae performed the song live at the 2022 MTV Europe Music Awards. The same month, she also performed the song live at Wetten, dass..?.

== Credits and personnel ==
=== Song ===
- Tate McRae – vocals, composer, lyricist
- Greg Kurstin – composer, lyricist, producer, engineer
- Dave Kutch – mastering engineer
- Mark Stent – mixing engineer
- Joey Raya – engineer
- Julian Burg – engineer
- Matt Wolach – assistant engineer

=== Music video ===
- Michelle Dawley – director, creative director, choreographer
- Tusk – director, creative director, executive producer, production
- Aiden Magarian – producer
- Cookie Walukas – associate producer
- Max Dean – assistant director
- Justin McWilliams – director of photography
- Bailey Sok – lead dancer
- Jasmine Mason – dancer
- China Taylor – dancer
- Findlay McConnell – dancer
- Emily Crouch – dancer
- Maycee Steele – dancer
- Jade Whitney – dancer
- Deirdre Barnes – choreographer
- Jason Parsons – choreographer actor
- Kathryn McCormick – judge
- Robert Roldan – judge
- Comfort Fedoke – judge
- Courtney Cooper – production designer
- Siena Montesano – Tate styling
- Ryan Richman – Tate McRae hair
- Gilbert Soliz – Tate McRae make-up
- Ann-Marie Hoang – dancer styling
- Elle Reed – dancer hair and make up
- Christa Philippeaux – editor
- Matt Osborne – color
- Marco Tornillo – sound
- Sabrina Rivera – video commissioner

== Charts ==
=== Weekly charts ===
Weekly chart performance for "She's All I Wanna Be"
Chart (2022)	Peak position
Australia (ARIA)	19
Austria (Ö3 Austria Top 40)	38
Belgium (Ultratop 50 Flanders)	21
Belgium (Ultratop 50 Wallonia)	10
Canada Hot 100 (Billboard)	10
Canada AC (Billboard)	17
Canada CHR/Top 40 (Billboard)	3
Canada Hot AC (Billboard)	5
Czech Republic Airplay (ČNS IFPI)	5
Denmark (Tracklisten)	23
Germany (GfK)	50
Global 200 (Billboard)	31
Greece International (IFPI)	99
Hungary (Rádiós Top 40)	30
Ireland (IRMA)	6
Lithuania (AGATA)	69
Netherlands (Dutch Top 40)	15
Netherlands (Single Top 100)	32
New Zealand (Recorded Music NZ)	36
Norway (VG-lista)	8
Portugal (AFP)	117
Slovakia Airplay (ČNS IFPI)	29
South Africa Streaming (TOSAC)	40
Singapore (RIAS)	4
Sweden (Sverigetopplistan)	24
Switzerland (Schweizer Hitparade)	63
UK Singles (Official Charts)	14
US Billboard Hot 100	44
US Adult Pop Airplay (Billboard)	18
US Pop Airplay (Billboard)	13

=== Year-end charts ===
2022 year-end chart performance for "She's All I Wanna Be"
Chart (2022)	Position
Australia (ARIA)	39
Austria (Ö3 Austria Top 40)	65
Belgium (Ultratop 50 Flanders)	36
Belgium (Ultratop 50 Wallonia)	56
Canada (Canadian Hot 100)	19
Denmark (Tracklisten)	93
Germany (Official German Charts)	87
Global 200 (Billboard)	144
Netherlands (Dutch Top 40)	73
UK Singles (OCC)	47
US Billboard Hot 100	94
US Mainstream Top 40 (Billboard)	34

== Certifications ==
Certifications for "She's All I Wanna Be"
Region	Certification	Certified units/sales
Australia (ARIA)	Platinum	70,000^{‡}
Austria (IFPI Austria)	Platinum	30,000^{‡}
Brazil (Pro-Música Brasil)	Platinum	40,000^{‡}
Canada (Music Canada)	3× Platinum	240,000^{‡}
Denmark (IFPI Danmark)	Platinum	90,000^{‡}
France (SNEP)	Gold	100,000^{‡}
Germany (BVMI)	Gold	300,000^{‡}
New Zealand (RMNZ)	2× Platinum	60,000^{‡}
United Kingdom (BPI)	2× Platinum	1,200,000^{‡}
United States (RIAA)	2× Platinum	2,000,000^{‡}
Streaming
Sweden (GLF)	Gold	4,000,000^{†}
^{‡} Sales+streaming figures based on certification alone.^{†} Streaming-only figures based on certification alone.

== Release history ==
Release dates and formats for "She's All I Wanna Be"
Region	Date	Format(s)	Label	Ref.
Various	February 4, 2022	Digital download; streaming	RCA	
United States	February 15, 2022	Contemporary hit radio	RCA	
Italy	February 25, 2022	Contemporary hit radio	Sony	
United States	March 7, 2022	Adult contemporary radio	RCA	
