= Sports Car (song) =

2025 single by Tate McRae

Single by Tate McRae

from the album So Close to What
- B-side: "Revolving Door"
- Released: January 24, 2025
- Genre: Pop; dance-pop
- Length: 2:46
- Label: RCA
- Songwriters: Tate McRae; Julia Michaels; Ryan Tedder; Grant Boutin
- Producers: Tedder; Boutin

Tate McRae singles chronology
"2 Hands" (2024)	"Sports Car" (2025)	"Revolving Door" (2025)

Music video
- "Sports Car" on YouTube

"Sports Car" is a song by Canadian singer Tate McRae. It was released on January 24, 2025, through RCA Records as the third single from her third studio album, So Close to What. The song was co-written with Julia Michaels, Grant Boutin and Ryan Tedder, and produced by the latter two. "Sports Car" received critical acclaim and peaked at number nine on the Canadian Hot 100. Outside of Canada, "Sports Car" peaked within the top ten of the charts in Australia, Bulgaria, Colombia, Guatemala, Ireland, Kazakhstan, New Zealand, Romania, Russia, and the United Kingdom.

== Background and composition ==
McRae announced the release of her third studio album, So Close to What, on November 14, 2024. An earlier version of the album, including a demo of "Sports Car", eventually leaked on January 16, 2025. McRae announced "Sports Car" as the third single on January 20 and shared a teaser from the music video, captioning it as part of what was "forgotten" to be leaked. The song debuted at number 21 on the Billboard Hot 100, becoming her second highest chart debut behind "It's OK I'm OK", and eventually peaked at number 16, making it the highest peaking single of the era.

The song is composed in a key of A, using the Phrygian dominant scale.

In an interview, McRae revealed that "Sports Car" was "such a fun song to write" with the intention to capture the "adrenaline of love, sex, and the excitement of it all". She used "sports car" as a metaphor for the feeling of love and revealed that they referenced a song by the American hip-hop duo Ying Yang Twins: "Wait (The Whisper Song)" with its "whispery" chorus.

== Critical reception ==
"Sports Car" received acclaim from music critics. George Griffiths of the Official Charts Company thought that "Sports Car" was a "stuttering, hip-hop influenced pop tune", characterized by "breathy melodies" as well as a prominent and addictive "spoken-word" chorus. Griffiths compared the song to tracks from In the Zone (2003) by Britney Spears. Likewise, Aaron Williams at Uproxx thought "Sports Car" was reminiscent of Spears' "I'm a Slave 4 U" (2001) and The Pussycat Dolls' "Buttons" (2006) and called it a continuation of the previous single "2 Hands" (2024). Nicole Collins of The Telegraph agreed with the reference, saying that it "feels like an ode to the peak Pussycat Dolls era of sweaty, sexy club tracks built on intoxicating beats". Similarly, Sam Franzini, writing for The Line of Best Fit, perceived in the track "a mix of Nelly Furtado and Timbaland's early-aughts output by way of 'Buttons' by The Pussycat Dolls – and it's gripping". Nick Levine of NME concluded that Pussycat Dolls and "Buttons" were clear references for the track. Paper magazine said "it's got everything a sultry banger needs" referencing the tracks "darkly toned synths, whispered hook and a thumping beat throughout that's perfect for McRae's dedication to modern choreography".

== Music video ==
The music video was released alongside the single on January 24, 2025, and was directed by Bardia Zeinali of Vogue. It features the singer posing in front of a mirror, wearing twelve outfits, transforming her from a "girl crush" to a "pop star". The outfits include a range of styles, including "archival pulls" and "current ready-to-wear pieces". In the video, a shadowy figure activates a "1970s peep show" as McRae enters the show booth and dances "seductively" with multiple outfit changes. The singer revealed that the cheetah print corset designed by Roberto Cavalli was her favorite wardrobe amongst the set.

== Live performances ==
"Sports Car" was performed live for the first time on Saturday Night Live on March 1, 2025. In September of that same year Tate McRae made her VMAs debut performing 'Sports Car' live in a medley with "Revolving Door", with a dance break that was widely praised online. Choreographer Robbie Blue was nominated at the 78th Primetime Creative Arts Emmy Awards for Outstanding Choreography for Variety or Reality Programming for the performance.

== Charts ==
=== Weekly charts ===
Weekly chart performance for "Sports Car"
Chart (2025–2026)	Peak position
Australia (ARIA)	8
Austria (Ö3 Austria Top 40)	17
Belarus Airplay (TopHit)	12
Belgium (Ultratop 50 Flanders)	40
Bolivia Anglo Airplay (Monitor Latino)	5
Bulgaria Airplay (PROPHON)	2
Canada Hot 100 (Billboard)	9
Canada CHR/Top 40 (Billboard)	1
Canada Hot AC (Billboard)	38
Canada AC (Billboard)	28
CIS Airplay (TopHit)	3
Colombia Anglo Airplay (Monitor Latino)	2
Croatia International Airplay (Top lista)	6
Czech Republic Airplay (ČNS IFPI)	35
Czech Republic Singles Digital (ČNS IFPI)	49
Denmark (Tracklisten)	28
Estonia Airplay (TopHit)	7
Finland (Suomen virallinen lista)	35
France (SNEP)	117
Germany (GfK)	33
Global 200 (Billboard)	17
Greece International (IFPI)	2
Guatemala Anglo Airplay (Monitor Latino)	5
Ireland (IRMA)	4
Israel International Airplay (Media Forest)	7
Japan Hot Overseas (Billboard Japan)	6
Kazakhstan Airplay (TopHit)	2
Latvia Airplay (LaIPA)	4
Latvia Streaming (LaIPA)	19
Lebanon (Lebanese Top 20)	5
Lithuania (AGATA)	31
Lithuania Airplay (TopHit)	4
Moldova Airplay (TopHit)	97
Netherlands (Dutch Top 40)	26
Netherlands (Single Top 100)	22
New Zealand (Recorded Music NZ)	9
Nicaragua Anglo Airplay (Monitor Latino)	2
Nigeria (TurnTable Top 100)	100
North Macedonia Airplay (Radiomonitor)	7
Norway (VG-lista)	18
Panama Anglo Airplay (Monitor Latino)	5
Poland (Polish Streaming Top 100)	65
Portugal (AFP)	32
Romania Airplay (Media Forest)	4
Romania TV Airplay (Media Forest)	10
Russia Airplay (TopHit)	2
Serbia Airplay (Radiomonitor)	15
Singapore (RIAS)	15
Slovakia Airplay (ČNS IFPI)	38
Slovakia Singles Digital (ČNS IFPI)	43
Sweden (Sverigetopplistan)	50
Switzerland (Schweizer Hitparade)	26
Ukraine Airplay (TopHit)	91
UK Singles (Official Charts)	3
Uruguay Anglo Airplay (Monitor Latino)	9
US Billboard Hot 100	16
US Adult Pop Airplay (Billboard)	11
US Dance Airplay (Billboard)	13
US Pop Airplay (Billboard)	2
Venezuela Anglo Airplay (Monitor Latino)	2

=== Monthly charts ===
Monthly chart performance for "Sports Car"
Chart (2025)	Peak position
Belarus Airplay (TopHit)	13
CIS Airplay (TopHit)	3
Estonia Airplay (TopHit)	12
Kazakhstan Airplay (TopHit)	2
Lithuania Airplay (TopHit)	8
Romania Airplay (TopHit)	9
Russia Airplay (TopHit)	3

=== Year-end charts ===
Year-end chart performance for "Sports Car"
Chart (2025)	Position
Australia (ARIA)	22
Belarus Airplay (TopHit)	51
Belgium (Ultratop 50 Flanders)	83
Belgium (Ultratop 50 Wallonia)	128
Bulgaria Airplay (PROPHON)	9
Canada (Canadian Hot 100)	14
Canada AC (Billboard)	70
Canada CHR/Top 40 (Billboard)	4
Canada Hot AC (Billboard)	45
CIS Airplay (TopHit)	8
Denmark (Tracklisten)	95
Estonia Airplay (TopHit)	140
Global 200 (Billboard)	60
Iceland (Tónlistinn)	79
Kazakhstan Airplay (TopHit)	7
Lithuania Airplay (TopHit)	19
Netherlands (Single Top 100)	76
New Zealand (Recorded Music NZ)	24
Romania Airplay (TopHit)	34
Russia Airplay (TopHit)	5
Switzerland (Schweizer Hitparade)	73
UK Singles (OCC)	22
US Billboard Hot 100	46
US Adult Pop Airplay (Billboard)	39
US Pop Airplay (Billboard)	21

== Certifications ==
Certifications for "Sports Car"
Region	Certification	Certified units/sales
Australia (ARIA)	4× Platinum	280,000^{‡}
Austria (IFPI Austria)	Platinum	30,000^{‡}
Belgium (BRMA)	Platinum	40,000^{‡}
Brazil (Pro-Música Brasil)	2× Platinum	80,000^{‡}
Canada (Music Canada)	4× Platinum	320,000^{‡}
Denmark (IFPI Danmark)	Gold	45,000^{‡}
France (SNEP)	Gold	100,000^{‡}
Hungary (MAHASZ)	2× Platinum	8,000^{‡}
Mexico (AMPROFON)	Gold	70,000^{‡}
Netherlands (NVPI)	Gold	46,500^{‡}
New Zealand (RMNZ)	2× Platinum	60,000^{‡}
Poland (ZPAV)	Gold	62,500^{‡}
Portugal (AFP)	2× Platinum	50,000^{‡}
Spain (Promusicae)	Gold	50,000^{‡}
Switzerland (IFPI Switzerland)	Gold	15,000^{‡}
United Kingdom (BPI)	Platinum	600,000^{‡}
United States (RIAA)	2× Platinum	2,000,000^{‡}
Streaming
Greece (IFPI Greece)	2× Platinum	4,000,000^{†}
^{‡} Sales+streaming figures based on certification alone.^{†} Streaming-only figures based on certification alone.

== Release history ==
"Sports Car" release history
Region	Date	Format	Label	Ref.
Various	January 24, 2025	Digital download; streaming	RCA	
United States	January 28, 2025	Contemporary hit radio	RCA	
Italy	January 31, 2025	Radio airplay	Sony	
Various	March 14, 2025	Remixes EP	RCA	
United States	September 12, 2025	4-inch vinyl	Sony	
