= It's OK I'm OK =

2024 single by Tate McRae

Single by Tate McRae

from the album So Close to What
- A-side: "Purple Lace Bra"
- Released: September 12, 2024
- Genre: Pop; electronic; hip-hop; R&B
- Length: 2:36
- Label: RCA
- Songwriters: Tate McRae; Ilya; Ryan Tedder; Savan Kotecha
- Producer: Ilya

Tate McRae singles chronology
"Exes" (2023)	"It's OK I'm OK" (2024)	"2 Hands" (2024)

Music video
- "It's OK I'm OK" on YouTube

"It's OK I'm OK" is a song by Canadian singer Tate McRae. It was released as the lead single from her third studio album, So Close to What (2025), on September 12, 2024, through RCA Records. The electronic and pop song with contemporary R&B elements and hip-hop influences was written by McRae, alongside Ryan Tedder, Savan Kotecha and Ilya, with production by the latter. The song was a commercial success, becoming McRae's highest-charting debut on the Billboard Hot 100, and reaching the top 20 in various countries including Australia, Canada, Norway, Singapore, the United Kingdom, and the United States. It became her first number one single on the Billboard Hot Dance/Pop Songs chart. A music video was released in which McRae was edited to appear naked, which garnered widespread media attention. Lyrically, the song sees McRae warning her ex's new lover that she only sees his good side and telling her she can have him regardless.

== Background and release ==
After releasing her second studio album, Think Later, in December 2023, McRae embarked on its supporting concert tour. The album produced "Greedy" (2023), which was one of her highest-charting singles. In March 2024, McRae revealed that she had returned to the studio and was "writing and seeing what first comes to mind right now, especially since it's so quickly after my album just dropped". McRae wrote the song "It's OK I'm OK" with Ryan Tedder, Savan Kotecha, and its producer, Ilya Salmanzadeh. The song is about a woman talking about her ex-boyfriend. The narrator is glad that she is no longer in a relationship with her ex, and warns his new girlfriend about him. The song is a moody electronic pop track with hip-hop influences and contemporary R&B elements. Salmanzadeh told Billboard in October 2024, the song was written after its composers asked McRae if she wanted something to drink during sessions at the studio to which McRae replied "it's okay, I'm okay" which Salmanzadeh found catchy.

On August 22, 2024, during her performance at Madison Square Garden, McRae premiered the new song as an encore on the tour. It included the lyrics "It's OK. I'm OK. I don't really gotta say. It's OK. You can have him anyway". According to Variety's Lexi Carson, "elements of [it] evoked songs from Britney Spears's 2000 album Oops!... I Did It Again". McRae posted a picture of herself with the song title written on sand in September 2024, stating that "yall aren't readyyy" for it. Her prior collaborator Tedder liked the post. RCA Records released the song as a single on September 12, 2024.

The song's live performance from Madison Square Garden was released exclusively to YouTube on September 18, 2024, and was uploaded to streaming platforms as a single on October 4, 2024.

A digital maxi-single with the original version of the song, an Ian Asher remix of the song, sped up and slowed down versions of the song, and the song's instrumental was released on October 11, 2024.

== Music video ==
The music video for the song was directed by Hannah Lux Davis. Speaking about inspirations behind the video, McRae said: "So many pop videos. Old Britney, old Christina. It's very campy, I would say. Sean [Bankhead] absolutely devoured the choreo". The music video takes place in New York City, and has McRae walk the streets in several outfits. At one point, she gets arrested while appearing to be naked. McRae revealed in an interview that she actually wore a Skims nude tube top and hotpants, and the nudity was edited into it later. Her parents were present on the set cheering; "Whoo, this is so fire!"

== Charts ==
=== Weekly charts ===
Weekly chart performance for "It's OK I'm OK"
Chart (2024–2025)	Peak position
Australia (ARIA)	14
Austria (Ö3 Austria Top 40)	49
Canada Hot 100 (Billboard)	12
Canada CHR/Top 40 (Billboard)	13
Canada Hot AC (Billboard)	20
Czech Republic Singles Digital (ČNS IFPI)	77
Denmark (Tracklisten)	35
Estonia Airplay (TopHit)	34
France (SNEP)	122
Germany (GfK)	71
Global 200 (Billboard)	19
Greece International (IFPI)	13
Ireland (IRMA)	13
Israel (Mako Hitlist)	89
Lebanon (Lebanese Top 20)	7
Lithuania (AGATA)	94
Lithuania Airplay (TopHit)	18
Netherlands (Single Top 100)	42
New Zealand (Recorded Music NZ)	12
Nigeria (TurnTable Top 100)	57
Norway (VG-lista)	14
Portugal (AFP)	39
Singapore (RIAS)	14
Slovakia Airplay (ČNS IFPI)	62
Slovakia Singles Digital (ČNS IFPI)	76
South Korea BGM (Circle)	157
Sweden (Sverigetopplistan)	39
Switzerland (Schweizer Hitparade)	41
UK Singles (Official Charts)	14
US Billboard Hot 100	20
US Adult Contemporary (Billboard)	30
US Adult Pop Airplay (Billboard)	19
US Hot Dance/Pop Songs (Billboard)	1
US Pop Airplay (Billboard)	8

=== Monthly charts ===
Monthly chart performance for "It's OK I'm OK"
Chart (2024)	Peak position
Estonia Airplay (TopHit)	67
Lithuania Airplay (TopHit)	21

=== Year-end charts ===
Year-end chart performance for "It's OK I'm OK"
Chart (2025)	Position
Australia (ARIA)	87
Canada CHR/Top 40 (Billboard)	54
Canada Hot AC (Billboard)	53
US Hot Dance/Pop Songs (Billboard)	5
US Pop Airplay (Billboard)	31

== Certifications ==
Certifications for "It's OK I'm OK"
Region	Certification	Certified units/sales
Australia (ARIA)	3× Platinum	210,000^{‡}
Austria (IFPI Austria)	Gold	15,000^{‡}
Belgium (BRMA)	Gold	20,000^{‡}
Brazil (Pro-Música Brasil)	2× Platinum	80,000^{‡}
Canada (Music Canada)	3× Platinum	240,000^{‡}
Denmark (IFPI Danmark)	Gold	45,000^{‡}
France (SNEP)	Gold	100,000^{‡}
New Zealand (RMNZ)	Platinum	30,000^{‡}
Poland (ZPAV)	Gold	62,500^{‡}
Portugal (AFP)	Gold	5,000^{‡}
Switzerland (IFPI Switzerland)	Gold	15,000^{‡}
United Kingdom (BPI)	Platinum	600,000^{‡}
United States (RIAA)	2× Platinum	2,000,000^{‡}
Streaming
Greece (IFPI Greece)	Gold	1,000,000^{†}
^{‡} Sales+streaming figures based on certification alone.^{†} Streaming-only figures based on certification alone.

== Release history ==
"It's OK I'm OK" release history
Region	Date	Format	Label	Ref.
Various	September 12, 2024	Digital download; streaming	RCA	
United States	September 17, 2024	Contemporary hit radio	RCA	
Italy	September 20, 2024	Radio airplay	Sony	

== See also ==
- List of Billboard number-one dance songs of 2025
