= List of songs recorded by Tate McRae =

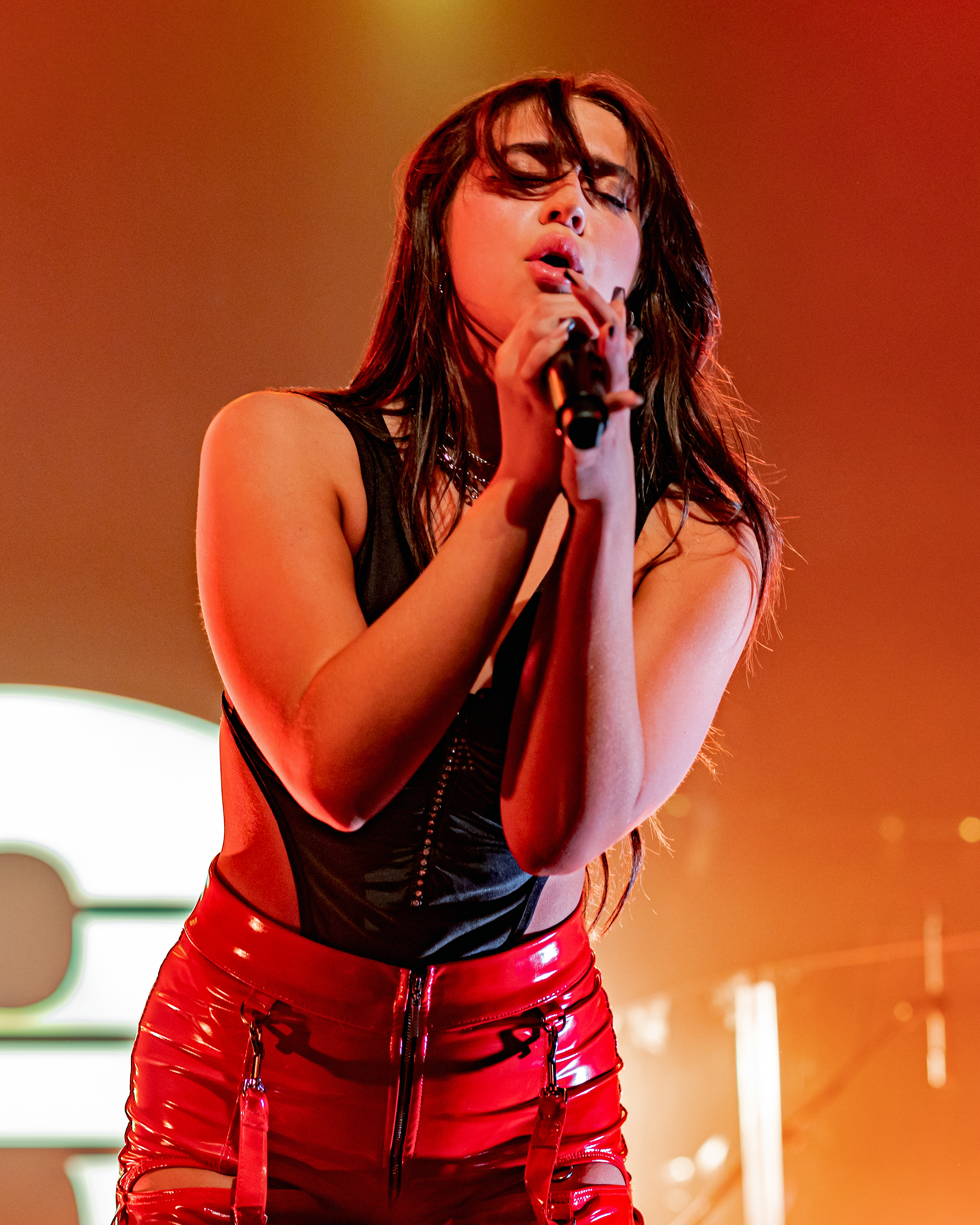
McRae performing at the Fonda Theatre in March 2022

Canadian singer Tate McRae has recorded songs for three studio albums, two extended plays (EP), and one mixtape, as well as some collaborative projects. She was a trained ballet dancer before starting her musical career. When McRae's dancing footage got deleted from her camera, she instead decided to upload an original song to her YouTube channel. The video got over 36 million views and she received offers from 11 different record labels, signing with RCA Records as they allowed her to pursue dancing and singing careers in parallel. McRae released several singles between 2017 and 2018. Her 2020 debut EP, All the Things I Never Said, was preceded by the singles "Tear Myself Apart", "All My Friends Are Fake", and "Stupid". McRae co-wrote four of its five tracks, and "Tear Myself Apart" was written by Billie Eilish and Finneas O'Connell.

McRae earned her first Billboard Hot 100 chart entry with the single "You Broke Me First" (2020). It preceded her second EP, Too Young to Be Sad, which was released in March 2021. On her pop and dance-pop debut studio album, I Used to Think I Could Fly (2022), McRae combined "acoustic singer/songwriter balladry and more robustly produced, post-Billie Eilish alt-pop" according to AllMusic's Matt Collar. She described the album, on which she co-wrote all 13 tracks, as "genuinely just my diary entries" and an expression of her "pent-up feelings, or ugly feelings". McRae's pop and R&B second studio album, Think Later, was released in December 2023. She co-wrote all 14 of its tracks, including the singles "Greedy" and "Exes", with Ryan Tedder, among others. Her third studio album, So Close to What, was released in February 2025 and debuted at number one in many countries, including Canada, United States, Ireland, Australia and many more. McRae has collaborated with other artists, including Tiësto, Ali Gatie, Blackbear, Khalid, Regard, Troye Sivan and Morgan Wallen. She has also contributed songs to the soundtracks of Tokyo Ghoul:re (2018) Panic (2021) and F1 (2025).

== Songs ==
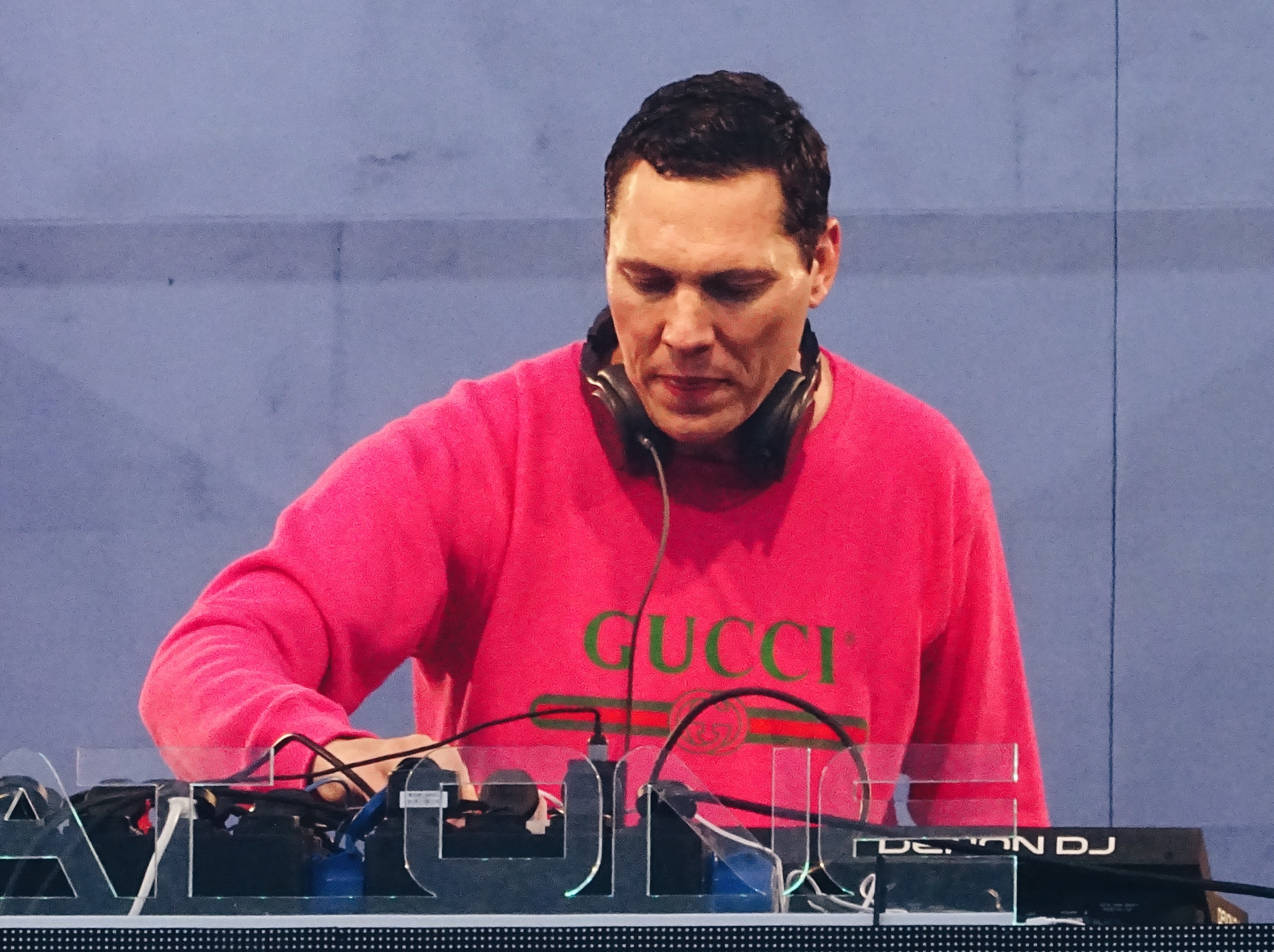
Tiësto and McRae collaborated on "10:35".

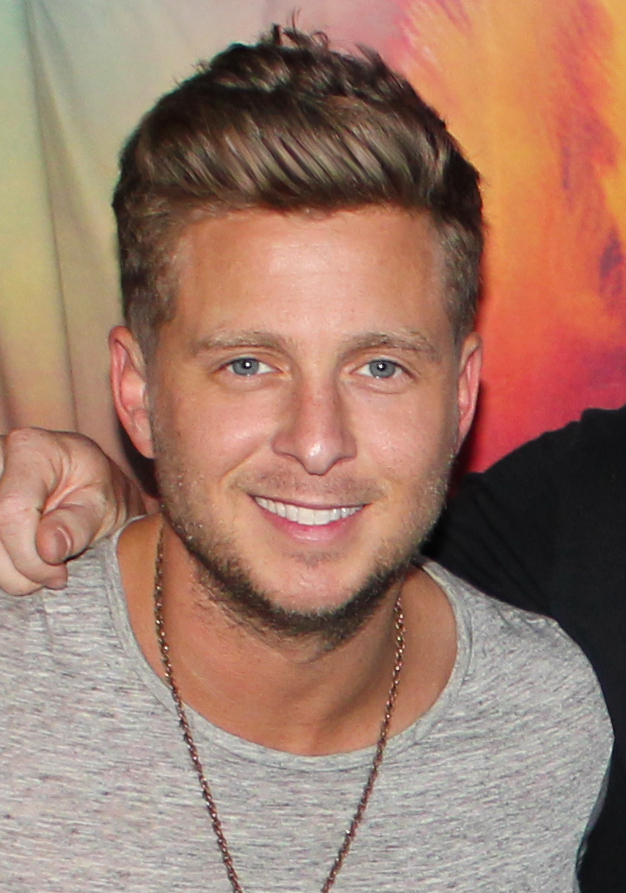
Ryan Tedder has co-written numerous McRae songs.

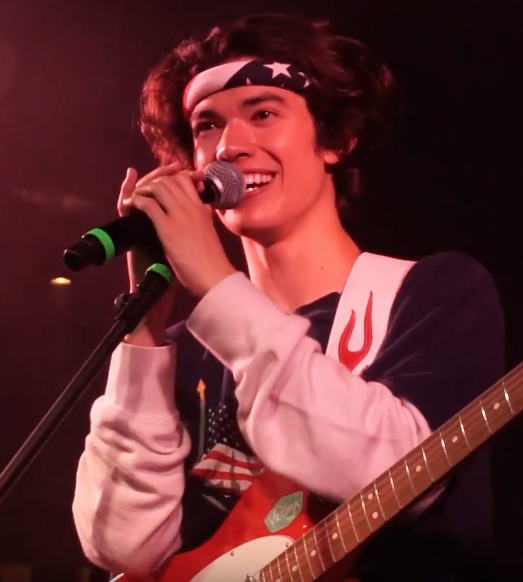
McRae has covered "Heather", written by Conan Gray.

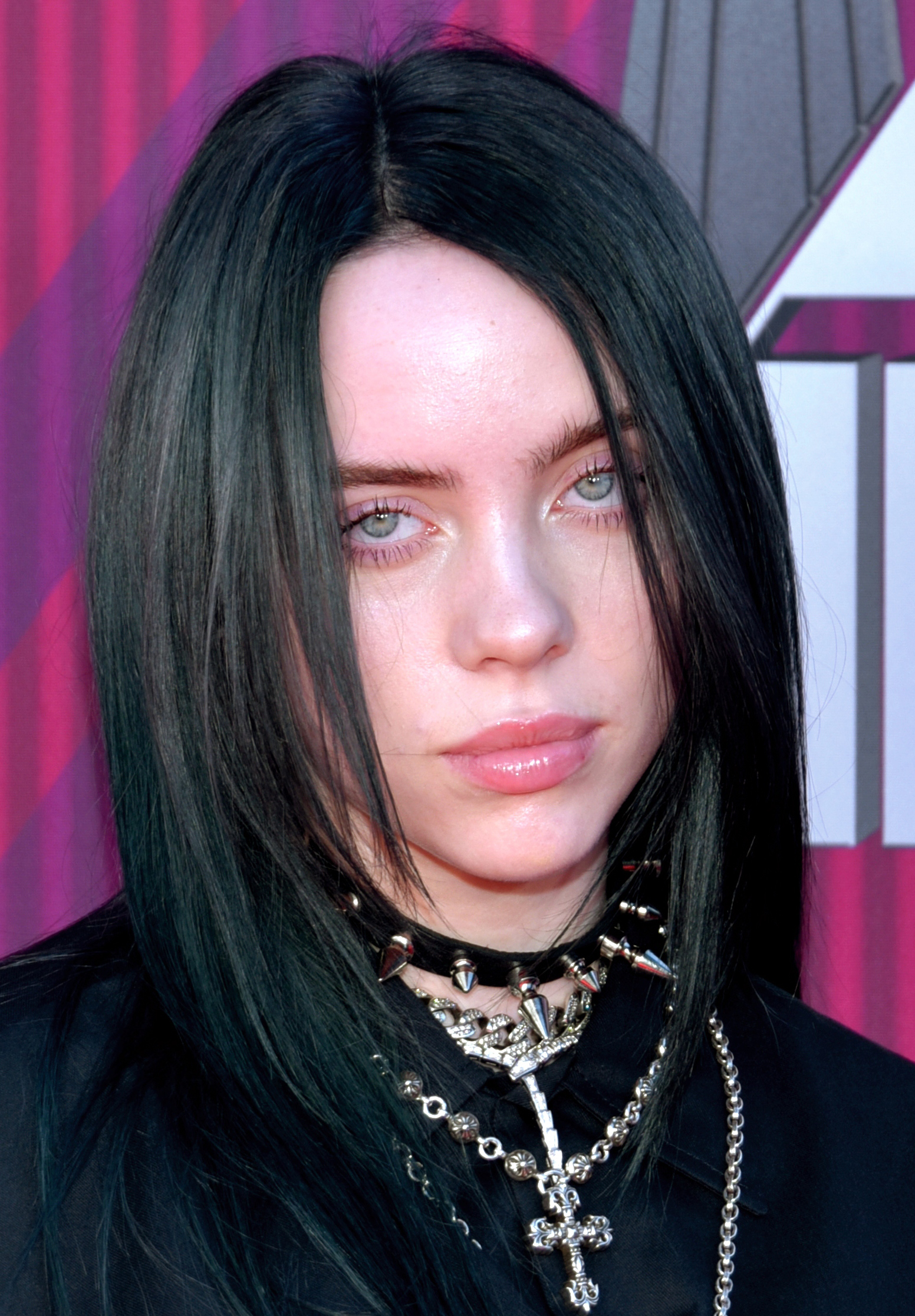
Billie Eilish co-wrote "Tear Myself Apart".

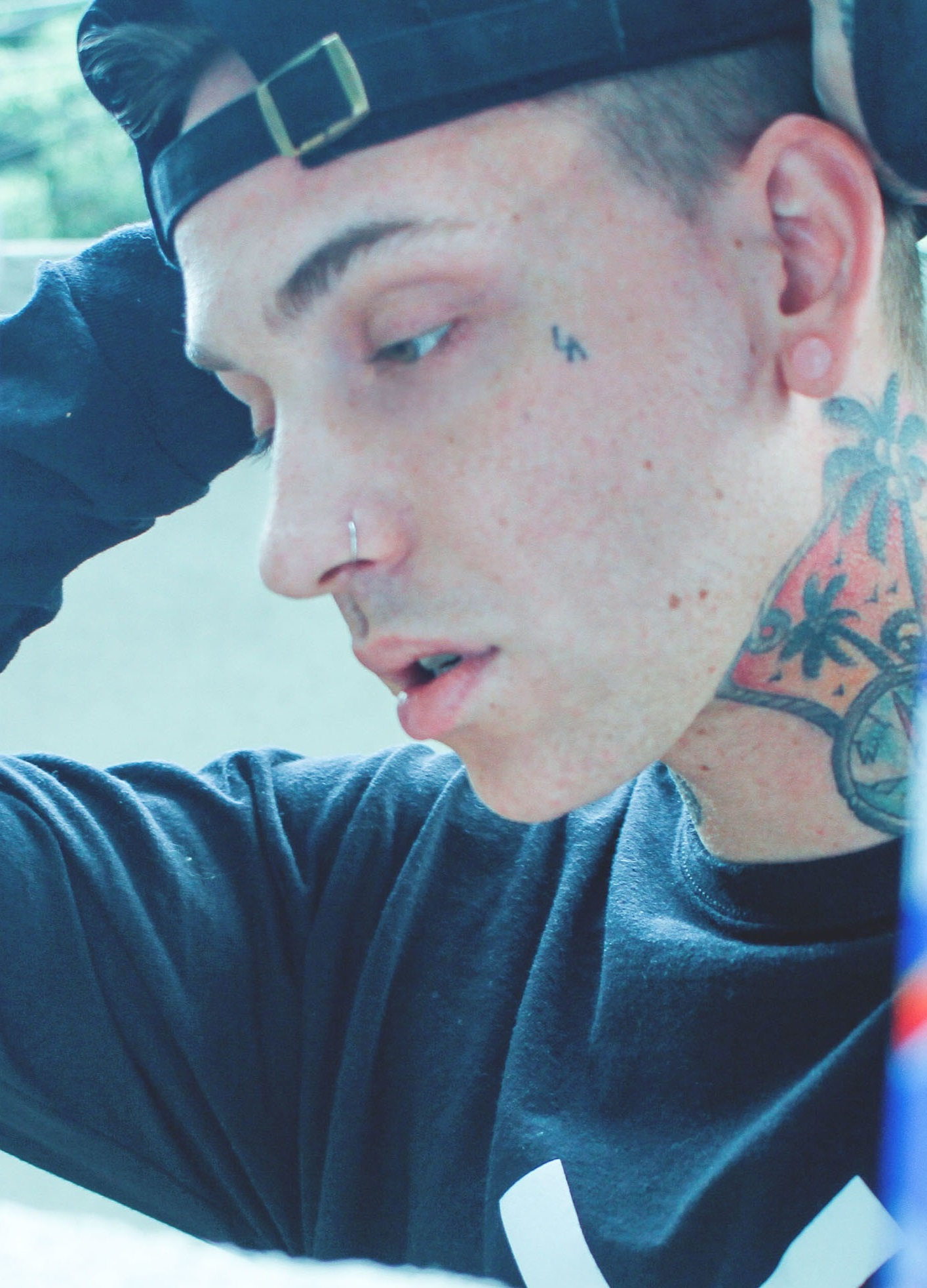
Blackbear and McRae collaborated on "U Love U".

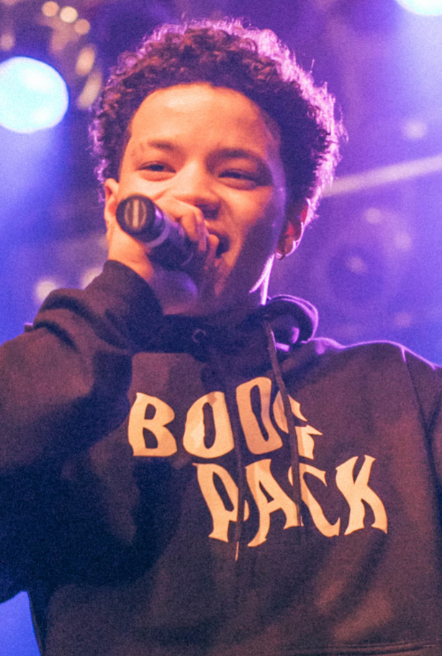
Lil Mosey features on "Vicious".

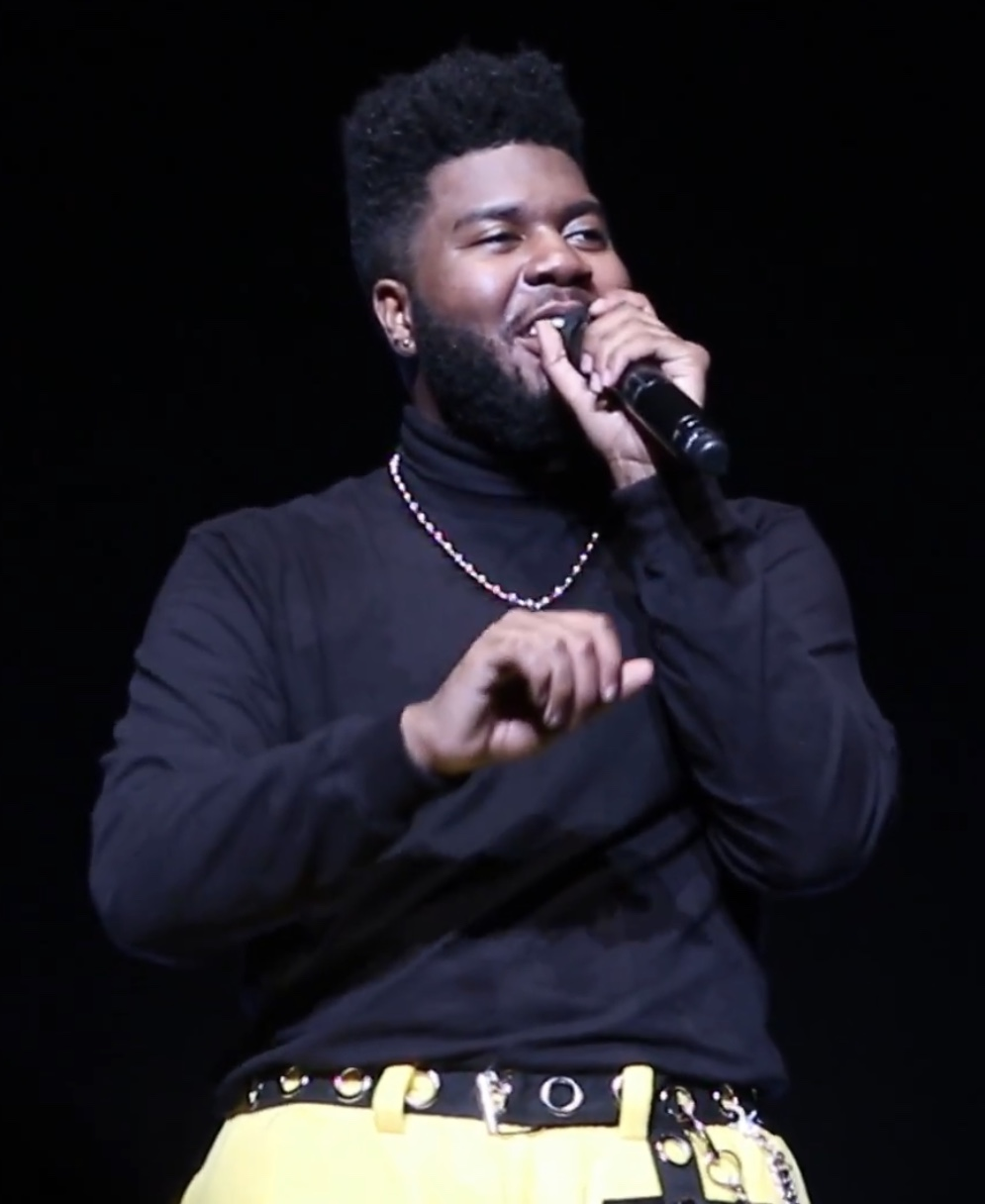
McRae and Khalid collaborated on "Working".

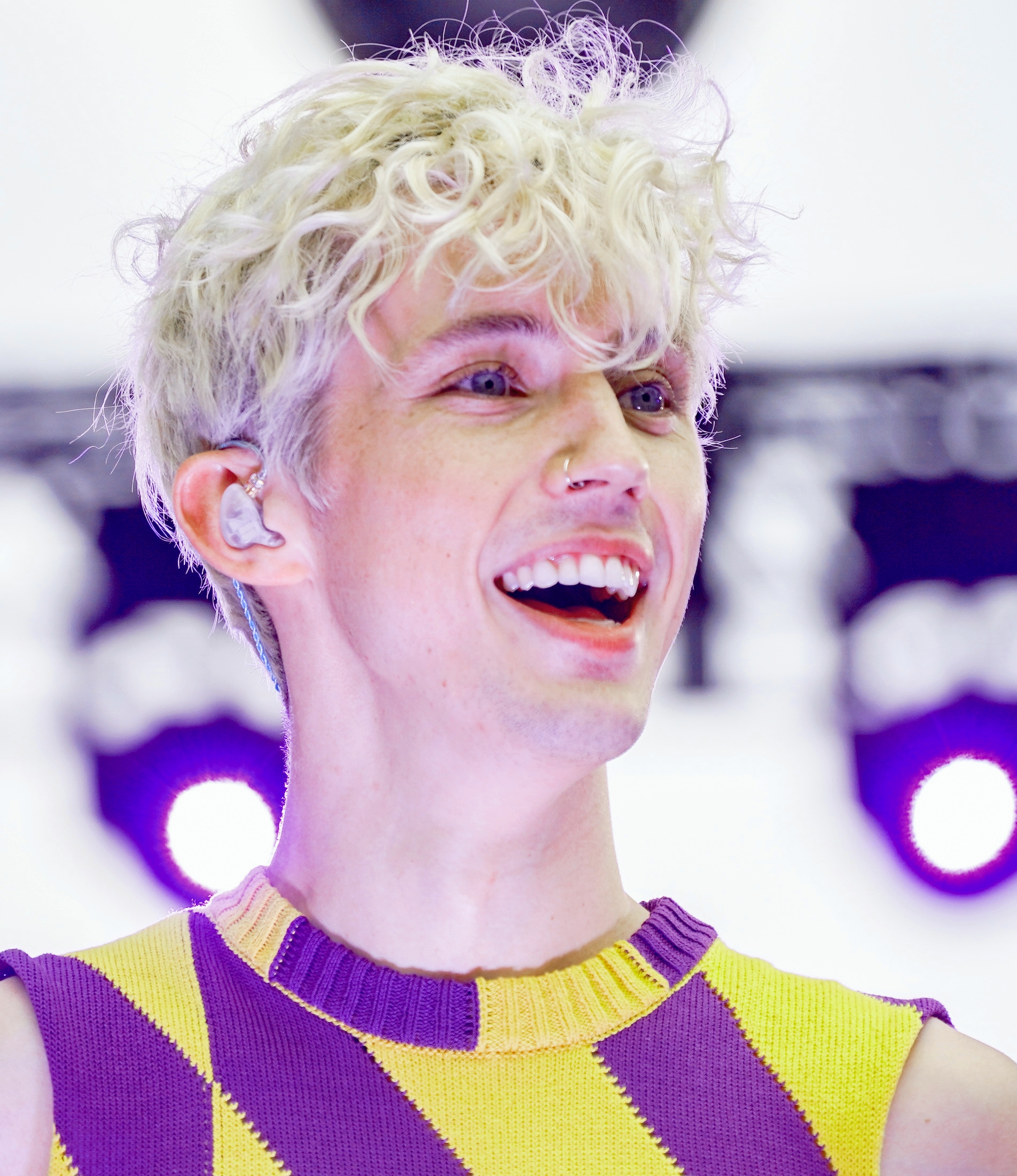
McRae and Troye Sivan collaborated on "You".

Song	Artist(s)	Writer(s)	Original release	Year	Ref.
"?"	Tate McRae	Tate McRae	I Used to Think I Could Fly	2022	
"10:35"	Tiësto featuring Tate McRae	Tate McRae; Tijs Verwest; Scott Harris; Amy Allen; Peter Rycroft; Ryan Tedder	Drive	2022	
"2 Hands"	Tate McRae	Tate McRae; Amy Allen; Ryan Tedder; Peter Rycroft	So Close to What	2024	
"ANYTHING BUT LOVE"	Tate McRae	Tate McRae Grant Boutin Julia Michaels	SO CLOSE TO WHAT??? (deluxe)	2025	
"All Day All Night"	Myles Erlick featuring Tate McRae	Russell Strange	ME	2017	
"All My Friends Are Fake"	Tate McRae	Tate McRae; Asia Whiteacre; Chris Petronsino; Rob McCurdy	All the Things I Never Said	2019	
"bloodonmyhands"	Tate McRae featuring Flo Milli	Tate McRae Grant Boutin Ryan Tedder Tamia Carter	So Close to What	2025	
"Better than I was"	Tate McRae	Tate McRae Grant Boutin Amy Allen	So Close to What (physical versions)	2025	
"Bad Ones"	Tate McRae	Tate McRae; Billy Walsh; James Bairian; Louis Castle	Too Young to Be Sad	2021	
"Boy X"	Tate McRae	Tate McRae; Alexander Glantz	I Used to Think I Could Fly	2022	
"Boys Ain't Shit"	Saygrace featuring Audrey Mika and Tate McRae	Britten Newbill; Ryan Williamson; Saygrace; Sam Fischer	Non-album single	2020	
"Call my bluff"	Tate McRae	Tate McRae Emile Haynie Amy Allen	So Close To What (physical versions)	2025	
"Calgary"	Tate McRae	Tate McRae; Ido Zmishlany	Think Later	2023	
"Can't Get It Out"	Tate McRae	Tate McRae; Gold Lauren	One Day	2018	
"Chaotic"	Tate McRae	Tate McRae; Victoria Zaro; Greg Kurstin	I Used to Think I Could Fly	2022	
"Cut My Hair"	Tate McRae	Tate McRae; Ryan Tedder; Amy Allen; Jasper Harris; Grant Boutin	Think Later	2023	
"Dear god"	Tate McRae	Tate McRae Ryan Tedder Grant Boutin Julia Michaels	So Close to What	2025	
"Darkest Hour"	Tate McRae	Isabella Summers; Jessica Chalker	Panic (Music From the Amazon Original Series)	2021	
"Distant"	Tate McRae	Tate McRae; Sean Charles Lew	One Day	2018	
"Don't Be Sad"	Tate McRae	Tate McRae; Jeremy Dussolliet; Larzz Principato	Non-album single	2020	
"Don't Come Back"	Tate McRae	Tate McRae; Lavell Webb; Ryan Vojtesak; Eldra DeBarge; Etterlene DeBarge; William DeBarge; Cornell Haynes Jr. Jason Epperson; Kaelyn Behr	I Used to Think I Could Fly	2022	
"Drown"	Tate McRae	Tate McRae; Jordan Orvash	One Day	2018	
"Exes"	Tate McRae	Tate McRae; Ryan Tedder; Tyler Spry	Think Later	2023	
"Feel Like Shit"	Tate McRae	Tate McRae; Victoria Zaro; Jacob Kasher Hindlin; Russell Chell	I Used to Think I Could Fly	2021	
"Greenlight"	Tate McRae	Tate McRae Grant Boutin	So Close to What	2025	
"Go Away"	Tate McRae	Tate McRae; Blake Harnage	I Used to Think I Could Fly	2022	
"Grave"	Tate McRae	Tate McRae; Ryan Tedder; Amy Allen; Andrew DeRoberts	Think Later	2023	
"Greedy"	Tate McRae	Tate McRae; Amy Allen; Jasper Harris; Ryan Tedder	Think Later	2023	
"Guilty Conscience"	Tate McRae	Tate McRae; Ryan Tedder; Ilya Salmanzadeh; Savan Kotecha; Amy Allen	Think Later	2023	
"HORSESHOE"	Tate McRae	Tate McRae Grant Boutin Emile Haynie Amy Allen	SO CLOSE TO WHAT??? (deluxe)	2025	
"Happy Face"	Tate McRae	Tate McRae; Elijah Fox-Peck; Remy Gautreau; Paul Daniel	All the Things I Never Said	2020	
"Hard to Find"	Tate McRae	Tate McRae; Beau Laine Shiminisky; Kristian Alexandrov	One Day	2017	
"Hate Myself"	Tate McRae	Tate McRae; Victoria Zaro; Charlie Puth; Blake Slatkin	I Used to Think I Could Fly	2022	
"Heather" (cover)	Tate McRae	Conan Gray	Non-album single	2020	
"Hung Up on You"	Tate McRae	Tate McRae; Beau Laine Shiminisky; Kristian Alexandrov	One Day	2017	
"Hurt My Feelings"	Tate McRae	Tate McRae; Ryan Tedder; Amy Allen; Jasper Harris; Grant Boutin	Think Later	2023	
"I know love"	Tate McRae featuring The Kid LAROI	Tate McRae Ryan Tedder Tyler Spry Julia Michaels Charlton Howard Billy Walsh	So Close to What	2025	
"I Still Say Goodnight"	Tate McRae	Tate McRae; Finneas O'Connell	I Used to Think I Could Fly	2022	
"I'll Be Home for Christmas" (cover)	Tate McRae	Buck Ram; Kim Gannon; Walter Kent	Non-album single	2021	
"I'm So Gone"	Tate McRae	Tate McRae; Kyle Stemberger; Nikolaos Grivellas; Keegan Bach	I Used to Think I Could Fly	2022	
"It's OK I'm OK"	Tate McRae	Tate McRae; Ilya; Ryan Tedder; Savan Kotecha	So Close to What	2024	
"Just Keep Watching"	Tate McRae	Tate McRae; Ryan Tedder; Tyler Spry	F1 The Album	2025	
"Kids Are Alright"	Tate McRae	Tate McRae; Nathan Levi Fertig; Zachary Scott Poor	Non-album single	2019	
"Like I do"	Tate McRae	Tate McRae Grant Boutin	So Close to What	2025	
"Lie to Me"	Tate McRae and Ali Gatie	Tate McRae; Ali Gatie; Eirik Gjendemsjø; Emily-Madelen Harbakk; Lise Reppe; Manon van Dijk; Marthe E. Strand; Nicolay Øverland; Victor Karlsen	The Idea of Her	2020	
"Means I Care"	Tate McRae	Tate McRae Ryan Tedder Rob Bisel Amy Allen Steven Michael Marsden	So Close to What	2025	
"Miss possessive"	Tate McRae	Tate McRae Ryan Tedder Blake Slatkin Amy Allen	So Close to What	2025	
"Messier"	Tate McRae	Tate McRae; Thomas LaRosa; Skyler Stonestreet	Think Later	2023	
"NOBODY'S GIRL"	Tate McRae	Tate McRae Emile Haynie Ryan Tedder Amy Allen	SO CLOSE TO WHAT??? (deluxe)	2025	
"No I'm not in love"	Tate McRae	Tate McRae Ryan Tedder Peter Roycroft Amy Allen	So Close to What	2025	
"Nostalgia"	Tate McRae	Tate McRae Grant Boutin Amy Allen	So Close to What	2025	
"One Day"	Tate McRae	Tate McRae; Beau Laine Shiminisky; Kristian Alexandrov	One Day	2017	
"Purple lace bra"	Tate McRae	Tate McRae Emile Haynie Amy Allen	So Close to What	2025	
"Plastic Palm Trees"	Tate McRae	Tate McRae; Greg Kurstin; Sarah Aarons	Think Later	2023	
"Revolving door"	Tate McRae	Tate McRae Ryan Tedder Grant Boutin Julia Michaels	So Close to What	2025	
"R U OK"	Tate McRae	Tate McRae; Bryan Fryzel; Elizabeth Lowell Boland	Too Young to Be Sad	2020	
"Remembering"	Yutaka Yamada featuring Tate McRae	Yutaka Yamada	東京喰種トーキョーグール:re Original Soundtrack	2018	
"Rubberband"	Tate McRae	Tate McRae; Andrew Goldstein; Jacob Kasher Hindlin; Natalie Solomon; Victoria Zaro	Too Young to Be Sad	2021	
"Run for the Hills"	Tate McRae	Tate McRae; Ryan Tedder; Amy Allen; Jasper Harris; Grant Boutin	Think Later	2023	
"Signs"	Tate McRae	Tate McRae Peter Rycroft Amy Allen	So Close to What	2025	
"Sports car"	Tate McRae	Tate McRae Ryan Tedder Grant Boutin Julia Michaels	So Close to What	2025	
"Siren sounds"	Tate McRae	Tate McRae Ari Starace Delacey	So Close to What	2025	
"She's All I Wanna Be"	Tate McRae	Tate McRae; Greg Kurstin	I Used to Think I Could Fly	2022	
"Shoulder to Shoulder"	Tate McRae	Tate McRae; Jocelyn Alice; Ryan Marshall	One Day	2018	
"Slip"	Tate McRae	Tate McRae; Nathan Levi Fertig; Zachary Scott Poor	One Day	2019	
"Slower"	Tate McRae	Tate McRae; Nolan Lambroza; Russell Chell; Zack Zadek; Zoe Moss	Too Young to Be Sad	2021	
"Sports Car"	Tate McRae	Tate McRae; Julia Michaels; Ryan Tedder; Grant Boutin	So Close to What	2025	
"Stay Done"	Tate McRae	Tate McRae; Ido Zmishlany; Delacey	Think Later	2023	
"Stupid"	Tate McRae	Tate McRae; Jeremy Dussolliet; Lauren Frawley; Russell Chell; Larzz Principato; Tim Sommers; Bleta Rexha; Justin Tranter; Jussi Karvinen; Meredith Brooks; Shelly Peiken	All the Things I Never Said	2019	
"TIT FOR TAT"	Tate McRae	Tate McRae Ryan Tedder Grant Boutin Julia Michaels	SO CLOSE TO WHAT??? (deluxe)	2025	
"TRYING ON SHOES"	Tate McRae	Tate McRae Emile Haynie Grant Boutin Amy Allen	SO CLOSE TO WHAT (deluxe)	2025	
"Tear Myself Apart"	Tate McRae	Billie Eilish O'Connell; Finneas O'Connell; Eric Palmquist	All the Things I Never Said	2019	
"Teenage Mind"	Tate McRae	Tate McRae	One Day	2018	
"That Way"	Tate McRae	Tate McRae; Skyler Stonestreet; Nick Monson	All the Things I Never Said	2020	
"Think Later"	Tate McRae	Tate McRae; Ryan Tedder; Amy Allen; Jasper Harris; Grant Boutin	Think Later	2023	
"U Love U"	Blackbear and Tate McRae	Tate McRae; Andrew Goldstein; Joe Kirkland; Matthew Musto	Misery Lake	2021	
"Uh Oh"	Tate McRae	Tate McRae; Ali Tamposi; Billy Walsh; Louis Bell	Non-album single	2022	
"Vicious"	Tate McRae featuring Lil Mosey	Tate McRae; James Abrahart; Lathan Echols; Mark Nilan; Victoria Zaro	Non-album single	2020	
"What I Want"	Morgan Wallen featuring Tate McRae	Morgan Wallen Tate McRae Joe Reeves John Byron Jacob Kasher Hindlin Ryan Vojtesak	I'm The Problem	2025	
"Want That Too"	Tate McRae	Tate McRae; Ryan Tedder; Amy Allen; Jasper Harris; Tyler Spry	Think Later	2023	
"We're Not Alike"	Tate McRae	Tate McRae; Rob Bisel; Delacey	Think Later	2023	
"What Would You Do?"	Tate McRae	Tate McRae; Alexander Glantz; Charlie Puth; Blake Slatkin	I Used to Think I Could Fly	2022	
"What's Your Problem?"	Tate McRae	Tate McRae; Jeremy Dussolliet; Jackson Foote	I Used to Think I Could Fly	2022	
"Wish I Loved You in the 90s"	Tate McRae	Tate McRae; Greg Kurstin; Maureen McDonald	Too Young to Be Sad	2021	
"Working"	Tate McRae and Khalid	Tate McRae; Joel Little; Khalid Robinson; Sarah Aarons	Non-album single	2021	
"You"	Regard, Troye Sivan and Tate McRae	Tate McRae; Regard; Troye Sivan; Frederik Castenschiold Eichen; Koda; Sakima; Tom Mann	Non-album single	2021	
"You Broke Me First"	Tate McRae	Tate McRae; Victoria Zaro; Blake Harnage	Too Young to Be Sad	2020	
"You're So Cool"	Tate McRae	Tate McRae; Billy Walsh; Ali Tamposi; Louis Bell; Omer Fedi	I Used to Think I Could Fly	2022	
