= At My Worst =

At My Worst may refer to:

- At My Worst (EP), a 2010 EP by Caroline Ailin
- "At My Worst", a 2020 single by Pink Sweats
- "@ My Worst", a 2020 single by Blackbear

A distinctive melody that resembles a rap melody with Focal melody
