= Brynn Rumfallo =

American dancer and reality TV star

- Born: July 1, 2003 (age 23)
- Occupations: Actress; dancer; model
- Years active: 2013–present
- Known for: Dance Moms

Brynn Rumfallo is an American dancer and television personality. She rose to fame in 2013 as a contestant on the eighth season of America's Got Talent with her dance team called “Fresh Faces”. She later garnered attention for her contemporary dance styles and winning national and regional competitions. In 2015, she first appeared on the Lifetime reality series, Dance Moms and became a permanent cast member of the elite team in 2016, before leaving in 2017 after appearing in three seasons.

Rumfallo has begun a career in modelling for brands including 'Abby Lee Apparel', 'Miss Behaved Girls', 'MissFit', 'California Kisses Dancewear' and has recently done appearances for contemporary boutique 'me.n.u'. In 2017, she released her own clothing collection, where she and her sister were the main models.

She has also appeared on the show "Dancing With The Stars" along with Maddie Ziegler and Jaycee Wilkins in 2015.

She appeared on the TV show “Boss Cheer” with her friend Sarah Reasons.

In 2023, she signed with Pierced Media, for a podcast she had with friend, Kelsey Millar. It was called Double Take, and has been on hiatus since 2023. She also teaches dance classes, and regularly posts on Instagram and Tiktok, as a social media influencer.

== Filmography ==
Year	Series	Role	Notes
2013	America's Got Talent	Herself (contestant, member of dance group "Fresh Faces")	Eliminated in Quarter-Finals, 3 episodes
2015	America's Got Talent	Herself (contestant, member of dance group "Complexity")	Cameo
2015	Dancing With The Stars	Herself (guest performer)	Performed with Jaycee Wilkins and Maddie Ziegler
2015–2017	Dance Moms	Herself	Guest, Season 5. Main, Seasons 6 – 7 (60 episodes)
2016	Dance Moms: The Girl's Guide To Life	Herself	TV and Online Mini-Series
2016	The Ellen DeGeneres Show	Herself	Cameo guest performer as part of "DancerPalooza"
2016	Teens Wanna Know	Herself	Episode: JoJo Siwa's 13th Birthday Bash
2016	Dance Moms: Game Night	Herself	Webseries
2016–2017	Dance Moms: Girl's Day Off	Herself	TV Mini Series
2017	Crashed	Herself, alongside Dance Moms cast	Guest appearance, 1 episode
2017	Sweety High	Herself, guest appearance	Interviewed
2018–2019	Boss Cheer	Charlotte S.	Brat series; 6 episodes

=== Music videos ===
Year	Song	Artist	Role
2015	"Turn Up The Track"	MattyB	Supporting
2016	"Ease On Down The Boulevard"	Todrick Hall	Main Cast
2016	"Straight Oughtta Oz"	Todrick Hall	Supporting
2016	"Dance Moms: Me Too"	Meghan Trainor	Supporting
2016	"Winner"	Nia Sioux	Cameo
2017	"Where Would I Be Without You"	Kendall K Vertes	Supporting

=== Commercials ===
Year	Company and product	Description
2016	Electro Kicks Electric	Rumfallo and others dancing in Electro Kicks shoes.

== Awards and nominations ==
Year	Award	Category	Result	Notes
2013	The Dance Awards	Mini Female Best Dancer	Top 10	
2013	The Dance Awards	Mini Solo	5th Runner-Up	
2013	The Dance Awards	Junior Duet/Trio	Won	Alongside Jaycee Wilkins and Dylynn Jones
2014	The Dance Awards	Mini Female Best Dancer	Won	
2015	The Dance Awards	Junior Duet/Trio	2nd Runner-Up	Alongside Jaycee Wilkins and Bostyn Brown
2015	The Dance Awards	Junior Duet/Trio	Won	Alongside Jaycee Wilkins
2016	CelebMix Awards	Best Dancer	Nominated	
