= Misery Lake =

EP by Blackbear
- Released: August 13, 2021
- Genre: Pop; pop rock; R&B
- Length: 18:14
- Label: Beartrap; Alamo; Columbia
- Producer: Blackbear; Andrew Goldstein

Blackbear chronology
Everything Means Nothing (2020)	Misery Lake (2021)	In Loving Memory (2022)

Singles from Misery Lake
- 1. "U Love U" Released: June 4, 2021; 2. "@ My Worst" Released: August 6, 2021

Misery Lake (stylized in all lowercase) is the seventh EP by American singer-songwriter and producer Blackbear. It was released on August 13, 2021 through Beartrap, Alamo, and Columbia Records and follows his previous album Everything Means Nothing. The EP was written and produced by Blackbear and frequent collaborator Andrew Goldstein and features appearances from Tate McRae, Sasha Alex Sloan, and Travis Barker. It was preceded by the singles "U Love U" with Tate McRae, released June 4, 2021, and "@ My Worst", released August 6, 2021.

== Background and composition ==
Misery Lake was conceived and recorded alongside Everything Means Nothing in multiple Airbnb houses. As a way to cope with COVID-19 lockdowns, Blackbear continued writing and recording music that eventually became the EP.

On the topics of heartbreak, loneliness, and isolation, Blackbear further described the background of the EP in an interview with Grammy.com:

It's about isolation–it's basically about quarantine and how you can feel loopy and you can feel happy and you can feel horrible all at the same time. I really felt like I was in this imaginary place and I started tagging [the location of] my photos on Instagram as "Misery Island," "Misery Lake" and stuff like that, and I was like, you know what? I love that for a title.

— Blackbear

== Critical reception ==
Paul Simpson of AllMusic gave the EP a 2.5 out of 5 star-rating and wrote that Misery Lake "is strictly something to put on if you're in the mood for some pristinely crafted venting". He praised the songs "U Love U" and "@ My Worst".

== Track listing ==
Misery Lake track listing
No.	Title	Writer(s)	Producer(s)	Length
1.	"Alone In a Room Full of People"	Matthew Musto; Andrew Goldstein; Joe Kirkland	Blackbear; Goldstein	2:34
2.	"@ My Worst"	Musto; Goldstein	Blackbear; Goldstein	3:11
3.	"U Love U" (with Tate McRae)	Musto; McRae; Goldstein; Kirkland	Blackbear; Goldstein	3:08
4.	"Ghost Town" (featuring Sasha Alex Sloan)	Musto; Goldstein	Blackbear; Goldstein	3:07
5.	"IMU" (featuring Travis Barker)	Musto; Barker; Goldstein; Jacob Kasher Hindlin	Blackbear; Goldstein; Barker	3:35
6.	"Bad Day"	Musto; Goldstein; Charlie Puth; Hindlin	Blackbear; Goldstein; Puth	2:39
Total length:				18:14

- All song titles are stylized in lowercase letters.

== Charts ==
Chart (2021)	Peak position
US Billboard 200	102
Canadian Albums (Billboard)	86
