= R U OK (song) =

2020 single by Tate McRae

Single by Tate McRae

from the EP Too Young to Be Sad
- Released: December 13, 2020
- Genre: Pop; R&B
- Length: 3:00
- Label: RCA
- Songwriters: Bryan Fryzel; Elizabeth Lowell Boland; Tate McRae
- Producers: Frequency; Lowell

Tate McRae singles chronology
"Lie to Me" (2020)	"R U OK" (2020)	"Rubberband" (2021)

"R U OK" (often stylised in lowercase) is a song by Canadian singer Tate McRae. It was released on December 13, 2020, through RCA Records as the second single from McRae's second extended play, Too Young to Be Sad (2021). The song was written by McRae, Bryan Fryzel and Lowell.

== Background ==
Tate McRae uploaded a snippet of the song on TikTok a few days prior to its release, describing it as a sequel to her breakthrough 2020 single "You Broke Me First". In the press release for the song she remarked, "'r u ok' is a song that I never thought I'd write. It has a very sassy and feisty tone, which made it a challenge to dive into that perspective – as I think I'm quite the opposite. I love that in this song there is a lot of emotional meaning behind the lyrics, with very trappy, bright and contrasting production at the same time".

McRae explained that she wrote the song with Lowell "on Zoom with [Lowell's] ukulele, just chilling on [her] bed" at home. She also compared the song to her track "You Broke Me First", describing "R U OK" as "the continued story of it, going into depth about the relationship from a person who's completely moved on".

== Critical reception ==
The song topped Billboard's list of "10 cool new pop songs to get you through the week". It was also featured on Mark Beaumont of The Guardian's list of tracks of the week and was said to give an update to the story told in "You Broke Me First". Dork described the song as stunning, calling it an "unstoppable slice of heartbreak pop" and a "hypnotic and smooth new anthem". Alexandra Pollard of The Independent remarked that the song offers "tongue-in-cheek broodiness" and noted that McRae has honed an artistic identity of mood-pop songs.

== Personnel ==
Credits adapted from Tidal.

- Frequency – producer
- Lowell – producer
- Bryan Fryzel – lyricist
- Elizabeth Lowell Boland – lyricist
- Tate McRae – lyricist, associated performer
- Dave Kutch – mastering engineer
- Jeff Juliano – mixing engineer
- David Cook – editor, engineer

== Charts ==
Chart performance for "R U OK"
Chart (2020)	Peak position
New Zealand Hot Singles (RMNZ)	19

== Certifications ==
Certifications for "R U OK"
Region	Certification	Certified units/sales
Canada (Music Canada)	Gold	40,000^{‡}
^{‡} Sales+streaming figures based on certification alone.

== Release history ==
Release dates and formats for "R U OK"
Region	Date	Format(s)	Label	Ref.
Various	December 10, 2020	Digital download; streaming	RCA	
