= Lowell (musician) =

Canadian songwriter

- Born: Elizabeth Lowell Boland; September 14, 1991 (age 34); Calgary, Alberta, Canada
- Genres: Pop, dance-pop, synthpop, pop rock, electropop
- Occupations: Songwriter, producer, singer
- Years active: 2012–present
- Label: Arts & Crafts

Elizabeth Lowell Boland, known by the stage name Lowell, is a Canadian singer, songwriter and producer known for her writing collaborations with JoJo, Beyoncé, Madison Beer, Hailee Steinfeld, Bülow, Tate McRae, and more.

== Background ==
Originally from Calgary, Alberta, Boland moved to Toronto, Ontario at age 18 to study music at the University of Toronto, but fell into drugs and an abusive relationship then resorted to working as a stripper at the New Locomotion venue in Toronto as Sara Victoria.

== Career ==
During this time, she began writing some song demos on ukulele, which came to the attention of Canadian music manager Mike Dixon. Dixon forwarded them in turn to producer Martin Terefe, and Boland made her debut in 2012 as a guest vocalist on Apparatjik's 2012 EP If You Can, Solve This Jumble.

She signed to Arts & Crafts, and released the EP I Killed Sara V in February 2014. Her full-length album debut, We Loved Her Dearly, followed in September 2014.

Her song, "Palm Trees" featured as soundtrack in the soccer game FIFA 15.

On April 6, 2018, she released her sophomore album Lone Wolf.

She co-wrote all three songs on the debut EP from Bülow, Damaged Vol. 1, which was released November 2017 on Wax Records, including the single "Not A Love Song." Damaged Vol. 1 was praised by critics for its "real and authentic" portrayal of Bülow's voice.

She received two Canadian Screen Award nominations at the 9th Canadian Screen Awards in 2021, for Best Original Score (with Michelle Osis) and Best Original Song (with Evan Bogart and Justin Gray) for "Grey Singing in Auditorium", for her work on the 2020 film Bloodthirsty.

== Discography ==
=== Studio albums ===
- 2014 – We Loved Her Dearly
- 2018 – Lone Wolf
- 2022 – hurry

=== Extended plays ===
- 2012 – If You Can, Solve This Jumble (with Apparatjik)
- 2014 – I Killed Sara V.
- 2016 – Part 1: PARIS YK
- 2021 – Bloodthirsty

=== Singles ===
- 2014 – "The Bells"
- 2016 – "Ride"
- 2016 – "High Enough"
- 2016 – "West Coast Forever"
- 2020 – "Lemonade"
- 2020 – "God Is A Fascist"
- 2021 – "Caroline"
- 2021 – "Black Boots And Leather Rebellion"
- 2022 – "Guess I'm Going To Hell"
- 2022 – "Hamptons City Cowboy"

== Songwriting discography ==
Title	Year	Artist	Album
"Take Care"	2013	Backstreet Boys	In a World Like This
"R U OK"	2020	Tate McRae	Too Young to Be Sad
"Lonely Hearts"	2020	JoJo	Good to Know
"In Your Room"	2020	JoJo	Good to Know
"Summer Feelings" (featuring Charlie Puth)	2020	Lennon Stella	Scoob! The Album
"Your Name Hurts"	2020	Hailee Steinfeld	Half Written Story
"End This (L.O.V.E.)"	2020	Hailee Steinfeld	Half Written Story
"Man Up"	2020	Hailee Steinfeld	Half Written Story
"Wrong Direction"	2020	Hailee Steinfeld	Half Written Story
"Good in Goodbye"	2021	Madison Beer	Life Support
"Effortlessly"	2021	Madison Beer	Life Support
"Blue"	2021	Madison Beer	Life Support
"Interlude"	2021	Madison Beer	Life Support
"Homesick"	2021	Madison Beer	Life Support
"Selfish"	2021	Madison Beer	Life Support
"Sour Times"	2021	Madison Beer	Life Support
"Baby"	2021	Madison Beer	Life Support
"Emotional Bruises"	2021	Madison Beer	Life Support
"Channel Surfing / the End"	2021	Madison Beer	Life Support
"This Sucks." (with MacKenzie Porter)	2021	Virginia to Vegas	Remember That Time We
"Ain't About You" (featuring Kiiara)	2021	Wonho	Love Synonym Pt.2: Right for Us
"Yuck"	2022	Charli XCX	Crash
"Suckerpunch"	2022	Fletcher	Girl of My Dreams
"Hot Crush Lover"	2022	Blu DeTiger	—N/a
"Girl Like Me"	2022	Dove Cameron	—N/a
"Never Have I Ever"	2023	Brett Kissel	The Compass Project – South Album
"Shit We Do for Love" (with Yaeger)	2023	Icona Pop	Club Romantech
"King of Everything"	2023	Madison Beer	Silence Between Songs
"EX EX EX (Whoops)"	2023	Rêve	Saturn Return
"Texas Hold 'Em"	2024	Beyoncé	Cowboy Carter
"Bodyguard"	2024	Beyoncé	Cowboy Carter
"Too Pretty for Buffalo"	2025	Baby Nova	Shhugar

== Production discography ==
Year	Artist	Song	Album
2020	Tate McRae	R U OK	Too Young to Be Sad
2021	Catie Turner	Hide and Seek	Non-album single
2023	The Beaches		Blame My Ex
2025	The Beaches		No Hard Feelings
