= Memory (Kane Brown and Blackbear song) =

2021 single by Kane Brown and Blackbear

Single by Kane Brown and Blackbear
- Released: July 9, 2021
- Genre: Country pop
- Length: 2:33
- Label: RCA Nashville
- Songwriters: Kane Brown; Ernest Keith Smith; Joe Kirkland; Andrew Goldstein; Matthew Musto
- Producers: Blackbear; Andrew Goldstein

Kane Brown singles chronology
"Famous Friends" (2020)	"Memory" (2021)	"One Mississippi" (2021)

Blackbear singles chronology
"U Love U" (2021)	"Memory" (2021)	"@ My Worst" (2021)

Music video
- "Memory" on YouTube

"Memory" is a song by American singers Kane Brown and Blackbear. It was released on July 9, 2021. The song was written by Brown, Ernest Keith Smith, Joe Kirkland, Andrew Goldstein and Blackbear, and produced by Blackbear and Goldstein.

== Background ==
"Memory" is a pop ballad that reflects on Brown and Blackbear's vices, including drugs and alcohol, and the anxieties of fame.

In WHTZ's interview, Brown said: "This song to me is going to go a bunch of different ways for people, it's kind of like a happy depression song..... It's just an uplifting song to find out you're not the only one."

== Music video ==
The music video was released on July 9, 2021. The singers play astronauts in the video, singing the song from the surface of the Moon as well as inside a spaceship.

== Charts ==
=== Weekly charts ===
Weekly chart performance for "Memory"
Chart (2021)	Peak position
Canada Hot 100 (Billboard)	28
Canada CHR/Top 40 (Billboard)	25
Global 200 (Billboard)	69
New Zealand Hot Singles (RMNZ)	12
US Billboard Hot 100	50
US Hot Country Songs (Billboard)	9
US Pop Airplay (Billboard)	17

=== Year-end charts ===
Year-end chart performance for "Memory"
Chart (2021)	Position
Canada (Canadian Hot 100)	93
US Hot Country Songs (Billboard)	53

== Certifications ==
Certifications for "Memory"
Region	Certification	Certified units/sales
Australia (ARIA)	Gold	35,000^{‡}
Canada (Music Canada)	3× Platinum	240,000^{‡}
United States (RIAA)	2× Platinum	2,000,000^{‡}
^{‡} Sales+streaming figures based on certification alone.

== Release history ==
Release history for "Memory"
Region	Date	Format	Label	Ref.
United States	July 9, 2021	Digital download	RCA Nashville	
United States	July 13, 2021	Contemporary hit radio	RCA Nashville	
