= Slower (song) =

2021 song by Tate McRae

Single by Tate McRae

from the EP Too Young to Be Sad
- Released: March 3, 2021
- Length: 3:08
- Label: RCA
- Songwriters: Nolan Lambroza; Russell Chell; Tate McRae; Zack Zadek; Zoe Moss
- Producers: Russel Chell; Sir Nolan

Tate McRae singles chronology
"Rubberband" (2021)	"Slower" (2021)	"You" (2021)

"Slower" is a song by Canadian singer and songwriter Tate McRae. It was released on March 3, 2021, through RCA Records as the fourth and final single from McRae's second extended play, Too Young to Be Sad. The song was written by McRae, Nolan Lambroza, Russell Chell, Zack Zadek and Zoe Moss.

== Background ==
Tate McRae originally released the demo version of the song on her YouTube series "Create with Tate" with the title "Ew Feelings (Aka Slower)". Speaking to Melinda Fakuade of Nylon, she recalled writing the song at the age of 14 and initially loving it, but being reluctant to release it years later. She noted that once the song was re-recorded and reproduced, it sounded completely different. In an interview with Wonderland she remarked about the song, "It was honestly about a guy who was being super flakey with me and I was fed up with always having to guess with him. It talks about how if he wasn't going to make up his mind, I was going to move on with my life". When discussing the song with Travis Mills of Apple Music, she mused that the song has taken on new meaning for her at the age of 17, representing the need to live in the moment.

== Critical reception ==
Audrey Brandes of music site Sheesh Media, described the track as simultaneously haunting and melodic, stating that McRae is on track to being crowned this generations's queen of breakup ballads. Brandes further praises McRae's vocals and emotional delivery, while remarking that McRae adeptly captures the complexities arising from the uncertainties of a relationship moving too fast, doubts about the other person's feelings and ambiguity about who both parties will be in the future. Brandes also applauds the production of the song noting that, "The chorus sounds like falling into oneself, simultaneously climactic and desperate. The vocals build in intensity, ultimately layering over each other and evoking a sense of multidimensionality – all the versions of herself past, present, and future existing at once". Skope Magazine described the song as instantly relatable and showcasing, self-reflective, intimate lyrics. Sam Murphy of music site 'the interns' remarked that McRae is fast becoming the queen of the sad jam, and described the track as warped pop song with a heavy emotional backbone, noting that the emotion McRae brings to her voice adds weight to her already piercing lyrics.

== Personnel ==
Credits adapted from Tidal.

- Nolan Lambroza – producer, lyricist, composer
- Russell Chell – producer, lyricist, composer
- Tate McRae – lyricist, composer, associated performer
- Zack Zadek – lyricist, composer
- Zoe Moss – lyricist, composer
- Dave Cook – misc. prod.
- Dave Kutch – mastering engineer
- Eric Palmquist – mixing engineer

== Live performances ==
In March 2021, McRae performed the song on Jimmy Kimmel Live! The performance recreated McRae's first viral video on YouTube, initially featuring her playing the keyboard against the background from that first video, before panning over to an elaborate and immaculately lit set and once a again closing with McRae playing the keyboard.

== Charts ==
Chart performance for "Slower"
Chart (2021)	Peak position
Canada Hot 100 (Billboard)	74
Canada CHR/Top 40 (Billboard)	19
Canada Hot AC (Billboard)	37
New Zealand Hot Singles (RMNZ)	10

== Certifications ==
Certifications for "Slower"
Region	Certification	Certified units/sales
Canada (Music Canada)	Platinum	80,000^{‡}
^{‡} Sales+streaming figures based on certification alone.

== Release history ==
Release dates and formats for "Slower"
Region	Date	Format(s)	Label	Ref.
Various	March 3, 2021	Digital download; streaming	RCA	
