= The Dance Awards =

National dance competition

- Awarded for: Excellence in dance
- Country: United States
- First award: 2011–present
- Website: https://thedanceawards.com

The Dance Awards is a national dance competition held annually in Las Vegas and Orlando. Dancers between the ages of five and eighteen are awarded to recognize excellence in dance.

== Overview ==
The Dance Awards (TDA) is a national dance competition produced by Dance One. The Dance Awards was first held in 2011 in New York City, where it continued to be held annually until 2015. In 2014, the competition expanded to a second location, Las Vegas. In 2016 the New York competition was moved to Orlando.

The competition is usually held in the first two weeks of July.

== Famous competitors ==
There have been several competitors that have competed or appeared on several other talent or dancing shows such as America's Got Talent, World of Dance, Dance Moms, Dancing with the Stars, and So You Think You Can Dance. Those competitors include Jenna Johnson, Briar Nolet, Ezra Sosa, Rylee Arnold, Tate McRae, Brynn Rumfallo, JoJo Siwa, Eva Igo, Maddie Ziegler, Elliana Walmsley, and Mackenzie Ziegler.

== New York City ==
New York City was the original location for the competition in 2011, but it was replaced by Orlando in 2016.

=== Studio of the Year Winners ===
Year	Studio	Director(s)
2011	Joanne Chapman School of Dance	Joanne Chapman
2012	Center Stage Performing Arts Studio	Kim Delgrosso and Alex Murillo
2013	JCSOD	Frank Giorgio
2014	Elite Danceworx	Dawn Rappitt
2015	Joanne Chapman School of Dance	Joanne Chapman

=== Male Best Dancer Winners ===
Year	Senior	Teen	Junior	Mini
2011	Daniel Gaymon (Columbia City Jazz)	Ricky Ubeda (Stars Dance Studio)	Jonathan Wade (Dance Unlimited)	Travis Atwood (Talent Factory)
2012	Ricky Ubeda (Stars Dance Studio)	Kyle Patrick Clark (Elite Danceworx)	D'Angelo Castro (Dance Town)	Jamaii Melvin (Dance Empire of Miami)
2013	Zelig Williams (Southern Strutt)	Zenon Zubyk (Elite Danceworx)	Julian Lombardi (JCSOD)	Joey Britt (Southern Strutt)
2014	Keanu Uchida (Leeming Danceworx)	Julian Elia (Elite Danceworx)	Findlay McConnell (Elite Danceworx)	Brady Farrar (Stars Dance Studio)
2015	Kyle Patrick Clarke (Elite Danceworx)	Logan Hernandez (Stars Dance Studio)	Murphy Lee (Performing Dance Arts)	Tristan Ianiero (Art & Soul Dance Company)

=== Female Best Dancer winners ===
Year	Senior	Teen	Junior	Mini
2011	Bianca Melchior (Elite Danceworx)	Sarah Pippin (CC & Co. Dance Complex)	Jayci Kalb (The Dance Centre)	Leara Stanley (CC & Co. Dance Complex)
2012	Jenna Johnson (Center Stage Performing Arts Studio)	Jazzmin James (Elite Danceworx)	Payton Johnson (Jean Leigh Academy of Dance)	Talia Seitel (Murrieta Dance Project)
2013	Miriam Gittens (The Dance Studio of Fresno)	Christina Ricucci (Murrieta Dance Project)	Kalani Hilliker (Club Dance Studio)	Tate McRae (Drewitz Dance Productions)
2014	Brianne Sellars (Dancemakers of Atlanta)	Jayci Kalb (The Dance Centre)	Sophia Lucia (RT Dance Academy)	Kayla Mak (Westchester Dance Academy)
2015	Jazzmin James (Elite Danceworx)	Payton Johnson (Jean Leigh Academy of Dance)	Tate McRae (YYC Dance Project)	Jezzaeyah Slack (Joanne Chapman School of Dance)

== Las Vegas ==
Las Vegas was introduced as a location in 2014.

=== Studio of the Year winners ===
Year	Studio	Director(s)
2014	Prodigy Dance and Performing Arts Centre	Camille Billelo Gross
2015	The Dance Studio of Fresno	Sue Sampson-Dalena
2016	Larkin Dance Studio	Molly Larkin and Michele Larkin
2017	Club Dance Studio	Kelli Wilkins
2018	Prodigy Dance and Performing Arts Centre	Camille Billelo Gross
2019	Center Stage Performing Arts Studio	Alex Murillo, Robin Murillo and Kim Delgrosso
2021	The Rock Center for Dance	Quinn Callahan
2021	Club Dance Studio	Kelli Wilkins
2021	Larkin Dance Studio	Molly Larkin-Symanietz and Michele Larkin-Wagner
2021	Danceology	Nicole Lucia
2021	Prodigy Dance and Performing Arts Centre	Camille Billelo Gross
2022	Danceology	Nicole Lucia
2023	Larkin Dance Studio	Molly Larkin-Symanietz and Michele Larkin-Wagner
2024	Expressenz Dance Center	Karla Geier
2025	The NINE Dance Academy	Vanessa Compton and Nikki Loiero

=== Male Best Dancer winners (LAS VEGAS) ===
Year	Senior	Teen	Junior	Mini
2014	Eric Scholoesser (Michelle Latimer Dance Academy)	Lex Ishimoto (West Coast School of the Arts)	Carter Williams (Center Stage Performing Arts Studio)	Joziah German (Prodigy Dance and Performing Arts Centre)
2015	Michael Hall (Columbia City Jazz)	Graham Feeny (Company C Dance Club)	Ryan Maw (Danceology)	Gavin Morales (The Rage)
2016	Lex Ishimoto (West Coast School of the Arts)	Sage Rosen (The company)	Holden Maples (Just for Kicks)	Artyon Celestine (Murrieta Dance Project)
2017	Timmy Blankenship (Artistic Fusion Dance Academy)	Ryan Maw (Danceology)	Tristan Ianiero (Art & Soul Dance Company)	JT Church (Club Dance Studio)
2018	Christian Smith (The Rock Center for Dance)	Joziah German (Prodigy Dance and Performing Arts Centre)	Jonathan Paula (Canadian Dance Unit)	Hudson Pletcher (Prodigy Dance and Performing Arts Academy)
2019	Findlay McConnell (Elite Danceworx)	Holden Maples (Westlake Dance Center)	Stefania Bonomo (Elite Danceworx)	Aedyn Bekker (Murrieta Dance Project)
2021	Alex Shulman (Danceology)	Caleb Abea (Larkin Dance Studio)	Cooper Macalalad (The Base Center for Dance)	Jacob Barrow (Danceology)
2022	Moses Rankine (Elite Danceworx)	Luke Barrett (Dance Attack! - Los Gatos)	Keenan Mentzos (PULSE Dance Centre)	Matthew Conway (Next Step Dance)
2023	Isaiah Villegas (Dance Connection 2)	Patricio Lopez (Flash Dance Studio)	Kazuma Brailsford (Honolulu Dance Studio)	Tristan Jones (Gotta Dance Academy)
2024	Hudson Pletcher (Prodigy Dance and Performing Arts Center)	Zachary Roy (Dance Town)	Matthew Conway (Next Step Dance)	Chase Lang (Larkin Dance Studio)
2025	Nathaniel Chua (The NINE Dance Academy)	Tristan Redly (The NINE Dance Academy)	Blais Lingle (Just Dance)	Brody Schaffer (Danceology)

=== Female Best Dancer winners ===
Year	Senior	Teen	Junior	Mini
2014	Alyssa Allen (Westside Dance Project)	Simrin Player (Club Dance Studio)	Emma Sutherland (Prodigy Dance and Performing Arts Studio)	Brynn Rumfallo (Club Dance Studio)
2015	Ashley Green (Columbia City Jazz)	Lucy Vallely (Elevation Studios)	Jaycee Wilkins (Club Dance Studio)	Avery Gay (Limitless at Master Ballet)
2016	Taylor Sieve (Larkin Dance Studio)	Emma Sutherland (Dance Industry Performing Arts Center)	Emma York (Danceology)	Kiarra Waidelich (The Rock Center For Dance)
2017	Simrin Player (Club Dance Studio)	Megan Goldstein (Westside Dance Project)	Avery Gay (Master Ballet Academy)	Brightyn Brems (Center Stage Performing Arts Studio)
2018	Lucy Vallely (Westside Dance Project)	Tate McRae (YYC Dance Project)	Kiarra Waidelich (The Rock Center For Dance)	Elliana Walmsley (Michelle Latimer Dance Academy)
2019	Ellie Wagner (Larkin Dance Studio)	Bostyn Brown (Club Dance Studio)	Addison Leitch (WESTSIDE Dance Project)	Crystal Huang (The Rock Center For Dance)
2021	Ella Horan (WESTSIDE Dance Project)	Savannah Kristich (The Rock Center For Dance)	Crystal Huang (The Rock Center For Dance)	Kelsie Jacobson (Larkin Dance Studio)
2022	Brianna Keingatti (Columbia Performing Arts Centre)	Avery Hall (Danceology)	Taylor Morrison (Dance Connection 2)	Finley Ashfield (Larkin Dance Studio)
2023	Carly Thinfen (Nor Cal Performing Arts)	Crystal Huang (The Rock Centre for Dance)	Fiona Wu (Yoko's Dance and Performing Arts)	Malia Scott (Larkin Dance Studio)
2024	Izzy Howard (Westside Dance Project)	Kylie Kaminsky (Danceology)	Skylar Wong (Woodbury Dance Center)	Belle Marie Arauz (Dance Town)
2025	Keira Redpath (Larkin Dance Studio)	Bree Batstone (Elite Danceworx)	Mali Photnetrakhom (Club Dance Studio)	Sienna DiPietro (The NINE Dance Academy)
2026	Cameron Voorhees (CCJ Conservatory)	Skylar Wong (Woodbury Dance Center)	Lucia Piedrahita (Club Dance Studio)	Lily Knopps (Club Dance Studio)

== Orlando ==
In 2016 Orlando replaced New York City as the second competition location.

=== Studio of the Year Winners ===
Year	Studio	Director
2016	Dance Town	Manny Castro and Lory Castro
2017	Vlad's Dance Company	Vlad Novitski
2018	Performing Dance Arts	Ashley Daychak
2019	Vlad's Dance Company	Vlad Novitski

=== Male Best Dancer Winners ===
Year	Senior	Teen	Junior	Mini
2016	Jonathan Wade (Dance Unlimited)	D'Angelo Castro (Dance Town)	Parker Garrison (Stars Dance Studio)	Jonathan Paula (The Dance Zone)
2017	Wyeth Walker (Denise Wall Dance Energy)	Findlay McConnell (Elite Danceworx)	Brady Farrar (Stars Dance Studio)	Stefania Bonomo (Elite Danceworx)
2018	Michael Novitski (Vlad's Dance Company)	Joey Gertin (Elite Danceworx)	Jackson Foley (Performing Dance Arts)	Anthony LaGrega (companyONE)
2019	D'Angelo Castro (Dance Town)	Murphy Lee (Performing Dance Arts)	Timothy Zvifel (Vlad's Dance Company)	Ian Stegeman (Woodbury Dance Center)
2021	Jaxon Willard (Center Stage Performing Arts Studio)	Brady Farrar (Stars Dance Studio)	Ian Stegeman (Woodbury Dance Center)	Michael Cash Savio (Stars Dance Studio)
2022	Seth Gibson (Studio 413)	Nicholas Moreno (Upstate Carolina Dance Center)	Zachary Roy (Dance Town)	Dylan Custodio (Stars Dance Studio)
2023	Sam Fine (Stars Dance Studio)	Ian Stegeman (Woodbury Dance Center)	Santiago Sosa (Stars Dance Studio)	Damian Shillis (Canadian Dance Company)
2024	Jackson Roloff-Hafenbreadl (Stars Dance Studio)	Kylan Wright (Stars Dance Studio)	Neo Del Corral (Stars Dance Studio)	Isaiah Santos (Stars Dance Studio)
2025	Nicholas Bustos (Stars Dance Studio)	Santiago Sosa (Stars Dance Studio)	Tristan Jones (Stars Dance Studio)	Jay Ramos-Rivera (Artistic Edge Dance Centre)

=== Female Best Dancer Winners ===
Year	Senior	Teen	Junior	Mini
2016	Jayci Kalb (The Dance Centre)	Morgan Higgins (Denise Wall Dance Energy)	Bostyn Brown (Club Dance Studio)	Diana Pombo (Stars Dance Studio)
2017	Payton Johnson (Jean Leigh Academy of Dance)	Quinn Starner (Stars Dance Studio)	Bella Klassen (YYC Dance Project)	Hailey Bills (Prodigy Dance and Performing Arts Centre)
2018	Morgan Higgins (Denise Wall Dance Energy)	Kelis Robinson (Elite Danceworx)	Ava Wagner (Larkin Dance Studio)	Cameron Voorhees (Evolve Dance Complex)
2019	Vivian Ruiz (Stars Dance Studio)	Ruby Castro (Dance Town)	Keagan Capps (The Pointe Performing Arts Center)	Gracyn French (Project 21)
2021	Kayla Mak (Westchester Dance Academy)	Dyllan Blackburn (Project 21)	Cameron Voorhees (Evolve Dance Complex)	Kya Massimino (Stars Dance Studio)
2022	Ruby Castro (Dance Town)	Hailey Bills (Center Stage Performing Arts Center)	Kylee Casares (Stars Dance Studio)	Skylar Wong (Woodbury Dance Center)
2023	Julia Lowe (Elite Danceworx)	Cameron Voorhees (Evolve Dance Complex)	Zoe Flores (Stars Dance Studio)	Ellary Day Szyndlar (Club Dance Studio)
2024	Sierra Drayton (Elite Danceworx)	Giselle Gandarilla (Stars Dance Studio)	Regan Gerena (Project 21)	Sylvie Win Szyndlar (Club Dance Studio)
2025	Sophie Garcia (Stars Dance Studio)	Kylee Casares (Stars Dance Studio)	Avery Altobelli (Epic Dance Complex)	Amaya Rodriguez (Dance Unlimited)

== LIVE ==
The Dance Awards LIVE was held online in 2020 as a response to the COVID-19 pandemic.

=== Male Best Dancer Winners ===
Year	Senior	Teen	Junior	Mini
2020	Joziah German (Prodigy Dance and Performing Arts Centre)	Easton Magliarditi (The Rock Center for Dance)	Nicholas Bustos (Stars Dance Studio)	Keenan Mentzos (PULSE Dance Centre)

=== Female Best Dancer Winners ===
Year	Senior	Teen	Junior	Mini
2020	Kelis Robinson (Elite Danceworx)	Kiarra Waidelich (The Rock Center for Dance)	Ali Ogle (Larkin Dance Studio)	Savannah Manzel (Larkin Dance Studio)

== Repeat Winners ==
=== Two Time Winners ===
- Ricky Ubeda: Teen 2011, Senior 2012
- Jazzmin James: Teen 2012, Senior 2015
- Kyle Patrick Clarke: Teen 2012, Senior 2015
- Emma Sutherland: Junior 2014, Teen 2016
- Lex Ishimoto: Teen 2014, Senior 2016
- Jonathan Wade: Junior 2011, Senior 2016
- Avery Gay: Mini 2015, Junior 2017
- Tristan Ianiero: Mini 2015, Junior 2017
- Ryan Maw: Junior 2015, Teen 2017
- Simrin Player: Teen 2014, Senior 2017
- Jonathan Paula: Mini 2016, Junior 2018
- Morgan Higgins: Teen 2016, Senior 2018
- Lucy Vallely: Teen 2015, Senior 2018
- Stefano Bonomo: Mini 2017, Junior 2019
- Bostyn Brown: Junior 2016, Teen 2019
- Holden Maples: Junior 2016, Teen 2019
- Murphy Lee: Junior 2015, Teen 2019
- Kelis Robinson: Teen 2018, Senior 2020
- Kayla Mak: Mini 2014, Senior 2021
- Keenan Mentzos: Mini 2020, Junior 2022
- Hailey Bills: Mini 2017, Teen 2022
- Hudson Pletcher: Mini 2018, Senior 2024
- Ruby Castro: Teen 2019, Senior 2022
- Matthew Conway: Mini 2022, Junior 2024
- Zachary Roy: Junior 2022, Teen 2024

=== Three Time Winners ===
- Jayci Kalb: Junior 2011, Teen 2014, Senior 2016
- Payton Johnson: Junior 2012, Teen 2015, Senior 2017
- Tate McRae: Mini 2013, Junior 2015, Teen 2018
- Findlay McConnell: Junior 2014, Teen 2017, Senior 2019
- D’Angelo Castro: Junior 2012, Teen 2016, Senior 2019
- Skylar Wong: Mini 2022, Junior 2024, Teen 2026
- Joziah German: Mini 2014, Teen 2018, Senior 2020
- Kiarra Waidelich: Mini 2016, Junior 2018, Teen 2020
- Brady Farrar: Mini 2014, Junior 2017, Teen 2021
- Crystal Huang: Mini 2019, Junior 2021, Teen 2023

=== Four Time Winners ===
- Cameron Voorhees: Mini 2018, Junior 2021, Teen 2023, Senior 2026
- Ian Stegeman: Mini 2019, Junior 2021, Teen 2023, Senior 2026
