= @ My Worst =

2021 song by Blackbear

Single by Blackbear

from the EP Misery Lake
- Released: August 6, 2021
- Genre: Pop
- Length: 3:11
- Label: Beartrap; Alamo; Columbia
- Songwriters: Matthew Musto; Andrew Goldstein
- Producers: Blackbear; Goldstein

Blackbear singles chronology
"Memory" (2021)	"@ My Worst" (2021)	"Love It When You Hate Me" (2022)

Music video
- "@ My Worst" on YouTube

"@ My Worst" (stylized in all lowercase) is a song by American singer Blackbear. It was released through Beartrap, Alamo, and Columbia Records on August 6, 2021 as the second single from his seventh EP Misery Lake.

== Background and composition ==
"@ My Worst" was written and produced by Blackbear and Andrew Goldstein. It was previewed in an Instagram story and a TikTok video posted in the EP's lead up. The song describes Blackbear hoping for his lover to still love them even when at his worst moments.

== Music video ==
The music video for "@ My Worst" premiered on August 6, 2021 and was directed by Brent Campanelli. The video features Blackbear performing and wandering a house party while a woman dressed as the Devil haunts him.

== Personnel ==
Credits for "@ My Worst" adapted from Apple Music.

Musicians
- Matthew Musto – lead vocals
- Blake Straus – guitar
- Kaela – keyboards
- Bonnie Brooksbank – violin
- Emily Elkin – cello
- Harry Allen – drums
Production
- Blackbear – production, recording engineering
- Andrew Goldstein – production, recording engineering
- Alex Ghenea – mixing
- Dave Kutch – mastering

== Charts ==
Chart performance for "@ My Worst"
Chart (2021)	Peak position
New Zealand Hot Singles (RMNZ)	11
US Bubbling Under Hot 100 (Billboard)	23

== Certifications ==
Certifications for "@ My Worst"
Region	Certification	Certified units/sales
United States (RIAA)	Gold	500,000^{‡}
^{‡} Sales+streaming figures based on certification alone.
