= All the Things I Never Said (Tate McRae EP) =

EP by Tate McRae
- Released: January 24, 2020
- Length: 15:00
- Label: RCA
- Producers: Russell Chell; Noise Club; Nick Monson; Eric Palmquist; Doc Daniel

Tate McRae chronology
All the Things I Never Said (2020)	Too Young to Be Sad (2021)

Singles from All the Things I Never Said
- 1. "Tear Myself Apart" Released: August 27, 2019; 2. "All My Friends Are Fake" Released: October 18, 2019; 3. "Stupid" Released: December 6, 2019; 4. "That Way" Released: September 10, 2021

All the Things I Never Said (stylized in all lowercase) is the debut extended play by Canadian singer Tate McRae. It was released on January 24, 2020, by RCA Records. The EP was supported by the release of three singles and one promotional single, and received positive reviews from critics.

== Background ==
After she released the five-track EP on January 24, 2020, she announced her first headlining tour of Europe and North America. Each stop on the tour was sold out. The lead single, "Tear Myself Apart", was co-written by Billie Eilish and Finneas O'Connell, and together with "All My Friends Are Fake" has amassed over 10 million streams online. The final single, "Stupid" clocked 4 million Spotify streams in December 2019, and charted in Ireland and Canada, earning significant radio airplay performance in the latter. The EP has since been streamed over 400 million times as of November 2021. Each song on the EP is also stylized in lowercase.

== Singles ==
"Tear Myself Apart" was released as the lead single from the EP on August 27, 2019. "All My Friends Are Fake" was released as the second single from the EP on October 18, 2019. "Stupid" was released as the third single from the EP on December 6, 2019. The song peaked at number 60 on the Canadian Hot 100. In 2021, "Stupid" was certified Platinum in Canada and Gold in the US, and promotional single "That Way" was certified Gold in the US and Canada, and Silver in the UK.

== Track listing ==
No.	Title	Lyrics	Music	Producer(s)	Length
1.	"Stupid"	Tate McRae; Jeremy Dussolliet; Lauren Frawley	Russell Chell; Larzz Principato; Tim Sommers; Bleta Rexha; Justin Tranter; Jussi Karvinen; Meredith Brooks; Shelly Peiken	Chell	2:53
2.	"All My Friends Are Fake"	McRae; Asia Whiteacre	Chris Petronsino; Rob McCurdy	Noise Club	3:06
3.	"That Way"	McRae; Skyler Stonestreet	Nick Monson	Monson	2:55
4.	"Tear Myself Apart"	Billie Eilish O'Connell; Finneas O'Connell	Eilish; Finneas; Eric Palmquist	Palmquist	2:45
5.	"Happy Face"	McRae; Elijah Fox-Peck; Remy Gautreau	Paul Daniel	Doc Daniel	3:21
Total length:					15:00

=== Notes ===
- "Stupid" interpolates "I'm a Mess", as performed by Bebe Rexha and written by Rexha, Justin Tranter and Jussi Karvinen. "I'm a Mess" contains an interpolation of the 1997 song "Bitch", performed by Meredith Brooks.

== Charts ==
Chart performance for All the Things I Never Said
Chart (2020)	Peak position
US Heatseekers Albums (Billboard)	16

== Certifications ==
Certifications for All the Things I Never Said
Region	Certification	Certified units/sales
Singapore (RIAS) with Too Young to Be Sad	Gold	5,000^{*}
^{*} Sales figures based on certification alone.
