= Vicious (Tate McRae song) =

2020 single by Tate McRae featuring Lil Mosey

Single by Tate McRae featuring Lil Mosey
- Released: June 19, 2020; May 5, 2021 (re-release)
- Length: 3:04 (original version); 3:02 (solo version)
- Label: RCA
- Songwriters: James Abrahart; Lathan Echols; Mark Nilan; Tate McRae; Victoria Zaro
- Producer: Mark Nilan

Tate McRae singles chronology
"You Broke Me First" (2020)	"Vicious" (2020)	"Don't Be Sad" (2020)

Lil Mosey singles chronology
"Only the Team" (2020)	"Vicious" (2020)	"Back at It" (2020)

"Vicious" is a song by Canadian singer Tate McRae featuring American rapper Lil Mosey. It was released on June 19, 2020 through RCA Records. The song was written by the two artists alongside James Abrahart, Victoria Zaro, and producer Mark Nilan.

== Background ==
In a press statement, McRae said, "Super stoked to be dropping 'vicious' featuring Lil Mosey. I've always been a fan of his work, so it's super dope to have a rapper like him jump on this record. Soooo excited for everyone to hear what we've been working on!!"

She also filmed the music video herself at home during isolation, which is intertwined with animations that see her transform into her alter ego and enter another universe.

== Personnel ==
Credits adapted from Tidal.

- Mark Nilan – producer, composer, lyricist, recording engineer
- James Abrahart – composer, lyricist
- Lathan Echols – composer, lyricist, associated performer, featured artist
- Tate McRae – composer, lyricist, associated performer
- Victoria Zaro – composer, lyricist
- Jeremie Inhaber – assistant engineer
- Scott Desmarais – assistant engineer
- Chris Galland – engineer
- Dave Kutch – mastering engineer
- Manny Marroquin – mixing engineer
- Benjamin Rice – vocal producer

== Charts ==
Chart performance for "Vicious"
Chart (2020)	Peak position
Canada CHR/Top 40 (Billboard)	35
New Zealand Hot Singles (RMNZ)	35

== Release history ==
Release dates and formats for "Vicious"
Region	Date	Format(s)	Label	Ref.
Various	June 19, 2020	Digital download; streaming	RCA	
