= Too Young to Be Sad =

EP by Tate McRae
- Released: March 26, 2021
- Length: 17:30
- Label: RCA
- Producers: Blake Harnage; The Gifted; Russell Chell; Sir Nolan; Andrew Goldstein; Naliya; Frequency; Lowell; Greg Kurstin

Tate McRae chronology
All the Things I Never Said (2020)	Too Young to Be Sad (2021)	I Used to Think I Could Fly (2022)

Singles from Too Young to Be Sad
- 1. "You Broke Me First" Released: April 17, 2020; 2. "R U OK" Released: December 13, 2020; 3. "Rubberband" Released: January 22, 2021; 4. "Bad Ones" Released: March 26, 2021

Too Young to Be Sad is the second extended play by Canadian singer Tate McRae. It was released on March 26, 2021, by RCA Records. The EP was preceded by three singles and one promotional single, with the fourth single released alongside the EP and received positive reviews from critics. On Spotify, the EP has amassed over one billion streams, making it the most streamed female EP of 2021 on Spotify.

== Background ==
McRae had discussed the release of the EP since February 2020, after the release of her debut EP All the Things I Never Said, mentioning that she was in the process of selecting the songs for the EP and planned to release it before the end of the year. However, due to the pandemic which allowed McRae to conduct several virtual writing sessions, the songs comprising the EP constantly shifted with newer songs knocking out older songs, and the release date was pushed to 2021. McRae eventually announced the release of the EP in March 2021 alongside her Apple Music Up Next campaign. Every song on the EP discusses failed relationships and heartbreak. McRae reflected on the title of the EP, noting that she wanted it to contradict the lyrical content of the songs which all deal with intense emotion, demonstrating that there is no need to fixate on heartbreak and drama. She noted that, "the title kind of disregards the whole thing but also wraps it up perfectly". All the songs on the EP were co-written by McRae, with 50 percent of them written in quarantine.

== Singles ==
"You Broke Me First", which became McRae's breakthrough single, was released as the lead single from the EP on April 17, 2020. The song was written in January 2020, and was McRae's last in person writing session. "You Broke Me First" became a hit worldwide, peaking in the top 10 of the charts in 13 countries, while reaching top 20 peaks in 12 countries. It has been certified multi-platinum in Australia, Brazil, Canada, New Zealand, Poland, Sweden and the US, and Platinum in Belgium, Denmark, Portugal, Switzerland, and the UK. It has sold over five million copies worldwide and has over 1.4 billion streams across platforms.

"R U OK" was released as the second single from the EP on December 13, 2020. It has been described by McRae as the sequel to "You Broke Me First". McRae has described the song as the "sassiest song she's ever written", noting that the contrast between the bright production and emotional lyrics makes it a weird mix of light-heartedness and intense emotion. "R U OK" has been streamed over 65 million times on Spotify, and peaked at number 19 of the New Zealand Hot Singles chart.

"Rubberband" was released on January 22, 2021, as the third single from the EP. McRae described the track as concerning the subject of addiction from a love perspective, describing how snapping a rubberband on your wrist can help a person cope with addiction. "Rubberband" has amassed over 50 million Spotify streams and peaked at number 91 of the Canadian charts, and 16 of the New Zealand Hot Singles Chart.

"Bad Ones" was released alongside the EP as the final single on March 26, 2021. McRae recalls falling in love with the track again after it was reproduced by Blake Harnage. The video for Bad Ones was co-directed by McRae, and has amassed over 7.5 million YouTube views and over 25 million Spotify streams. "Bad Ones" peaked at number 19 on the New Zealand Hot Singles Chart.

Promotional singles

"Slower" was released on March 5, 2021, as the first and only promotional single from the EP. The song was initially released as part of McRae's "Create with Tate" YouTube series and was written when she was 14. McRae notes that while the track was initially about a guy who was stringing her along, and her desire to move on if he failed to commit, it now represents the idea that she needs to live in the moment. "Slower" has since been streamed over 50 million times on Spotify and peaked at number 74 of the Canadian charts and number 10 of the New Zealand Hot Singles Chart.

== Critical reception ==
Professional ratings
Review scores
Source	Rating
AllMusic	3/5 stars
DIY	3.5/5 stars
Trouw	3/5 stars

Too Young To Be Sad received positive reviews from critics, praising McRae's vocal performance, the production and lyrical themes. Many critics considered this EP an improvement compared to its predecessor. Eloise Bulmer of DIY noted that while the EP dwells on the well-trodden ground of growing pains arising from relationship drama, McRae sounds earnest and convincing. "You Broke Me First" and "Wish I Loved You in the 90s" were singled out as stand out tracks. Overall, Bulmer sums up the EP as a solid demonstration of what McRae does best, being among the class of young songwriters successfully turning old cliches into fresh perspectives. Laura Freyaldenhoven of When the Horn Blows spoke highly of the EP, describing it as everything you want from a pop record, with flawless hooks, spectacular sceneries and not a single note out of place, adding that on the EP, one sonic high chases another, as the emotional scales are raised throughout the record. Freyaldenhoven further praised the production and songwriting of the EP, noting that it is "a gorgeous blend of magnetic, slow-moving beats and soaring hooks, infused with a heart-on-sleeve lyricism that is as relatable as it is heart-breaking".

== Track listing ==
Too Young to Be Sad track listing
No.	Title	Writer(s)	Producer(s)	Length
1.	"Bad Ones"	Tate McRae; Billy Walsh; James Bairian; Louis Castle	Blake Harnage; The Gifted	3:03
2.	"Rubberband"	McRae; Andrew Goldstein; Jacob Kasher; Natalie Solomon; Victoria Zaro	Goldstein; Naliya	2:27
3.	"Slower"	McRae; Nolan Lambroza; Russell Chell; Zack Zadek; Zoe Moss	Russell Chell; Sir Nolan; Dave Cook^{[m]}	3:08
4.	"R U OK"	McRae; Bryan Fryzel; Elizabeth Lowell Boland	Frequency; Lowell; Cook^{[v]}	3:06
5.	"You Broke Me First"	McRae; Zaro; Harnage	Harnage	2:49
6.	"Wish I Loved You in the 90s"	McRae; Greg Kurstin; Maureen McDonald	Kurstin	2:57
Total length:				17:30

Notes

- All tracks are stylized in all lowercase
- ^{^[m]} signifies a miscellaneous producer
- ^{^[v]} signifies a vocal producer

== Personnel ==
- Tate McRae – vocals
- Dave Kutch – mastering
- Jeff Juliano – mixing
- Dave Cook – engineering (tracks 1, 4, 6), editing (4)
- Blake Harnage – engineering (5)
- Greg Kurstin – engineering, acoustic guitar, bass guitar, electric guitar, synthesizer (6)
- Julian Burg – engineering (6)

== Charts ==
Chart performance for Too Young to Be Sad
Chart (2021)	Peak position
Australian Albums (ARIA)	97
Canadian Albums (Billboard)	23
Finnish Albums (Suomen virallinen lista)	34
Lithuanian Albums (AGATA)	19
New Zealand Albums (RMNZ)	40
Norwegian Albums (VG-lista)	14
US Billboard 200	94

== Certifications ==
Certifications for Too Young to Be Sad
Region	Certification	Certified units/sales
Canada (Music Canada)	Gold	40,000^{‡}
New Zealand (RMNZ)	Platinum	15,000^{‡}
Poland (ZPAV)	Gold	10,000^{‡}
Singapore (RIAS) with All the Things I Never Said	Gold	5,000^{*}
^{*} Sales figures based on certification alone.^{‡} Sales+streaming figures based on certification alone.
