= U Love U =

2021 song by Blackbear

Single by Blackbear and Tate McRae

from the EP Misery Lake
- Released: June 4, 2021
- Genre: Pop
- Length: 3:08
- Label: Beartrap; Alamo; Columbia
- Songwriters: Matthew Musto; Tate McRae; Andrew Goldstein; Joe Kirkland
- Producers: Blackbear; Goldstein

Blackbear singles chronology
"Jealousy" (2021)	"U Love U" (2021)	"Memory" (2021)

Tate McRae singles chronology
"You" (2021)	"U Love U" (2021)	"Working" (2021)

Music video
- "U Love U" on YouTube

"U Love U" (stylized in all lowercase) is a song by American singer Blackbear and Canadian singer Tate McRae. It was released through Beartrap, Alamo, and Columbia Records on June 4, 2021 as the lead single from the former's seventh EP Misery Lake.

== Background and composition ==
"U Love U" was written by Blackbear, Tate McRae, Andrew Goldstein, and Joe Kirkland and produced by Blackbear and Goldstein. The song was previewed in a TikTok video posted on May 20, 2021. It focuses on the pair's respective partners' selfish behaviors. Blackbear further described the background of the song with Melodic magazine:

"U Love U" is the perfect blend of nostalgic synths and new school drums that paints a picture of what it's like to be in a relationship with a person who loves themselves so much that you feel alone. The opening line, "It's been over for a year or so, I should have left a couple tears ago", sets it right up for what is ultimately an anthem for breaking up and to invest more time in yourself.

— Blackbear

== Music video ==
The music video for "U Love U" premiered on June 4, 2021 and was directed by Boni Mata. The video features Blackbear and McRae performing in various abandoned structures.

== Personnel ==
Credits for "U Love U" adapted from Apple Music.

Musicians
- Matthew Musto – vocals, keyboards, programming, bass guitar
- Tate McRae – vocals
- Andrew Goldstein – guitar, keyboards, programming
Production
- Blackbear – production, recording engineering
- Goldstein – production, recording engineering
- Dave Cook – vocal recording engineering
- Alex Ghenea – mixing
- Dave Kutch – mastering

== Charts ==
Chart performance for "U Love U"
Chart (2021)	Peak position
Canada (Canadian Hot 100)	91
New Zealand Hot Singles (RMNZ)	9
