= Lie to Me (Tate McRae and Ali Gatie song) =

2020 single by Tate McRae and Ali Gatie

Single by Tate McRae and Ali Gatie

from the EP The Idea of Her
- Released: October 14, 2020
- Length: 2:57
- Label: RCA
- Songwriter(s): Ali Gatie; Eirik Gjendemsjø; Emily-Madelen Harbakk; Lise Reppe; Manon van Dijk; Marthe E. Strand; Nicolay Øverland; Tate McRae; Victor Karlsen
- Producer(s): Bad One; Mark Nilan; Nicolay Øverland; Nova Blue; kkami

Tate McRae singles chronology
"Don't Be Sad" (2020)	"Lie to Me" (2020)	"R U OK" (2020)

Ali Gatie singles chronology
"Welcome Back" (2020)	"Lie to Me" (2020)	"Can’t Let You Go" (2021)

Music video
- "Lie to Me" on YouTube

"Lie to Me" is a song by Canadian singer Tate McRae and Iraqi–Canadian singer and songwriter Ali Gatie. It was released on October 14, 2020 through RCA Records. The song was written by the artists, along with Eirik Gjendemsjø, Emily-Madelen Harbakk, Lise Reppe, Manon van Dijk, Marthe E. Strand, Nicolay Øverland, McRae and Victor Karlsen.

== Background ==
Tate McRae announced the release of her new single with Ali Gatie on her Twitter, "SO UMM @aligatie AND I FINALLY COLLABED!!!! GUYS i hope you enjoy this music video. it was such a great time to film. we filmed it from 7pm-6am! love you guys sooo much! this is 'lie to me':)" In an interview with Billboard, when asked whether she previews her songs on TikTok first, McRae said, "Sometimes I'll record a voice memo with the clip of the song a week before I drop it. When Ali Gatie and I released 'Lie to Me', we did this video that started me with me asking him, 'Do you wanna write a song?' Everyone was super into it".

== Personnel ==
Credits adapted from Tidal.

- Bad One – producer
- Mark Nilan – producer
- Nicolay Øverland – producer, lyricist
- Nova Blue – producer
- kkami – producer
- Ali Gatie – lyricist, associated performer
- Eirik Gjendemsjø – lyricist
- Emily-Madelen Harbakk – lyricist
- Lise Reppe – lyricist
- Manon van Dijk – lyricist
- Marthe E. Strand – lyricist
- Tate McRae – lyricist, associated performer
- Victor Karlsen – lyricist
- Dave Kutch – mastering engineer
- John Rausch – mixing engineer

== Charts ==
Chart performance for "Lie to Me"
Chart (2020)	Peak position
Canada (Canadian Hot 100)	76
New Zealand Hot Singles (RMNZ)	10

== Certifications ==
Region	Certification	Certified units/sales
Canada (Music Canada)	Gold	40,000^{‡}
^{‡} Sales+streaming figures based on certification alone.

== Release history ==
Release dates and formats for "Lie to Me"
Region	Date	Format(s)	Label	Ref.
Various	October 14, 2020	Digital download; streaming	RCA	
