= That Way (Tate McRae song) =

2020 song by Tate McRae

Single by Tate McRae and Jeremy Zucker

from the EP All the Things I Never Said
- Released: September 10, 2021
- Genre: Pop
- Length: 2:55
- Label: RCA
- Songwriters: Skyler Stonestreet; Nick Monson; Tate McRae; Jeremy Zucker (duet version)
- Producer: Nick Monson

Tate McRae singles chronology
"Working" (2021)	"That Way" (2021)	"Feel Like Shit" (2021)

Jeremy Zucker singles chronology
"Cry with You" (2021)	"That Way" (2021)	"Therapist" (2021)

Music video
- "That Way" on YouTube

Solo cover

"That Way" (stylized in all lowercase letters) is a song by Canadian singer Tate McRae, from her debut EP, All the Things I Never Said (2020). The song was written by McRae, Skyler Stonestreet, and Nick Monson and produced by Nick Monson as a minimalist piano ballad. A version of the song with American singer Jeremy Zucker was sent to Italian radio on September 10, 2021.

== Background and release ==
McRae originally previewed first half of the song on YouTube in December 2019. The song was officially released alongside her EP on January 24, 2020. The song was written in late 2018 or early 2019, when McRae was in Grade 10. The song became a sleeper hit, performing moderately on its release but after going viral on TikTok in 2021, due to the lyric "friends don't look at friends that way", the song charted in the UK and Ireland, and was certified Platinum in the US, Gold in Australia, Canada, and Denmark and Silver in the UK. The song has attracted over 470,000 videos on TikTok combined, over 202 million views on TikTok on the official sound, and over 370 million streams on Spotify. A remix with Jeremy Zucker was released on September 3, 2021.

== Composition and lyrics ==
The song narrates a friendship that becomes more than platonic, but both parties can't act on their mutual attraction for each other. McRae has noted that the song is based on a real experience and is about having a crush on someone you know you would never be with. The song was described by Ashley Osborn of Ones to Watch as the sadder, more mature version of Taylor Swift's "You Belong with Me". Osborn remarked that the song expresses sentiments of deeper feelings for a friend matched by unclear signs, resulting in perplexing dejection. The song has also been described as using "heartbreakingly specific lyrics to describe a friendship that always comes tantalizingly close to taking the next step but never does, the friendship itself on life support as it hangs around in an awkward limbo".

== Critical reception ==
Writing for Ones to Watch, Ashley Osborn remarks that the song is the perfect testament to McRae's incredible ability to express distinct moments of emotional strife through her unique thread of vocal performance. Music review site Ben's Beat describes that the song as one of the most emotional tracks on the EP, noting that McRae's sorrowful vocals are mainly supported by muted percussion hits and slowly moving piano chords, but this suffices, due to the conviction and heartfelt emotion in the song.

== Music video ==
The music video featured McRae dancing alone in a room lit with blue light, to her own choreography, in the contemporary dance style. McRae remarked of the video in a press release, "I have multiple sides to me; a lot of layers that people have not yet seen. My dancing is a huge part of my life, so I'm so glad I finally get to create movement to a song that's really personal to me".

== Live performances ==
McRae performed the song on Late Night with Seth Meyers on October 14, 2021.

== Credits ==
Credits adapted from Tidal

- Tate McRae – vocals, composer, lyricist
- Skyler Stonestreet– composer, lyricist
- Nick Monson – producer, composer, lyricist, engineer
- Dave Kutch – mastering engineer
- Dave Cook – mixing engineer

== Charts ==
Chart performance for "That Way"
Chart (2021)	Peak position
Ireland (IRMA)	59
Sweden Heatseeker (Sverigetopplistan)	1
UK Singles (Official Charts)	82

== Certifications ==
Certifications for "That Way"
Region	Certification	Certified units/sales
Australia (ARIA)	Gold	35,000^{‡}
Brazil (Pro-Música Brasil)	3× Platinum	120,000^{‡}
Canada (Music Canada)	2× Platinum	160,000^{‡}
Denmark (IFPI Danmark)	Platinum	90,000^{‡}
France (SNEP)	Gold	100,000^{‡}
Mexico (AMPROFON)	Gold	30,000^{‡}
New Zealand (RMNZ)	Platinum	30,000^{‡}
Poland (ZPAV)	Gold	25,000^{‡}
Spain (Promusicae)	Gold	30,000^{‡}
United Kingdom (BPI)	Platinum	600,000^{‡}
United States (RIAA)	2× Platinum	2,000,000^{‡}
^{‡} Sales+streaming figures based on certification alone.
