= Tate McRae =

Canadian singer and dancer (born 2003)

- McRae in 2024
- Born: Tate Rosner McRae; July 1, 2003 (age 23); Calgary, Alberta, Canada
- Occupations: Singer; songwriter; dancer
- Years active: 2012–present
- Works: Discography; songs recorded
- Awards: Full list
- Tate McRae's voice When asked if she and Olivia Rodrigo play music together Recorded September 2023 Musical career
- Genres: Pop; alt-pop; dance-pop
- Labels: Nettwerk; RCA
- Website: tatemcrae.com

Tate Rosner McRae (born July 1, 2003) is a Canadian singer, songwriter, and dancer. McRae began her career as a dancer, appearing as a contestant on the American reality television series So You Think You Can Dance in 2016. After signing with RCA Records, she released the extended plays (EPs) All the Things I Never Said (2020) and Too Young to Be Sad (2021); the latter became the most streamed female EP of 2021 on Spotify, while its single "You Broke Me First" marked her first US Billboard Hot 100 entry. She released her debut studio album, I Used to Think I Could Fly, the following year.

McRae's second studio album, Think Later (2023), explored a more pop-oriented sound and was led by the Billboard Global 200 number-one single "Greedy". In 2025, she topped the US Billboard 200 with her third studio album, So Close to What, and scored her first US Billboard Hot 100 number-one single with the duet "What I Want". She also earned a Grammy Award nomination for the soundtrack single "Just Keep Watching". In 2026, the single "Housewife" became her second Billboard Global 200 chart topper.

== Early life and education ==
Tate Rosner McRae was born in Calgary, Alberta, on Canada Day, 2003, the daughter of Tanja Rosner, a German dance instructor, and Todd McRae, a lawyer for oil and gas companies who has Scottish ancestry. At the age of two, she moved with her family to Oman on account of her father's work; she lived there for three years. During her time in Oman, McRae attended The American International School Muscat (TAISM). McRae began recreational dance training at age six. Having returned to Calgary at the age of eight, she began to train more intensively in dance and competed with Drewitz Dance Productions. From age 11 onward, she began training in all styles of dance at YYC Dance Project, a dance company owned by her mother, and underwent ballet training at the School of Alberta Ballet, the training school for the Alberta Ballet Company. McRae attended Western Canada High School and graduated online in 2021.

== Career ==
=== 2013–2018: Dance career ===
McRae was awarded Mini Best Female Dancer at the 2013 Dance Awards in New York City. After gaining some prominence through social media, she became a brand ambassador for the American dance shoes manufacturer Capezio. She became a finalist at the New York City Dance Alliance's 2014 National Gala. She also voiced Spot Splatter Splash for the Lalaloopsy (2013–2015) franchise.

In 2015, McRae was awarded a two-week scholarship at the Berlin State Ballet company after winning the silver medal as a soloist and the bronze medal for her duet at the 2015 Youth America Grand Prix. She danced in the music video for Walk off the Earth's platinum-certified single "Rule the World". For the second time, McRae was awarded the Best Female Dancer award at the 2015 Dance Awards, this time in the Junior category.

In June 2016, she performed at Justin Bieber's concert in Calgary for the Purpose World Tour during Bieber's performance of "Children". In April 2016, McRae performed on The Ellen DeGeneres Show as part of the DancerPalooza troupe. In June 2016, she took part in the thirteenth season of American television show So You Think You Can Dance. While competing for the America's Favorite Dancer title as a non-American, she was mentored by American dancer and actress Kathryn McCormick. She advanced further in the competition than any other Canadian in the show's history, placing third on the final episode. The Toronto Sun reacted, "The fact that Canadians couldn't vote for Tate makes her third-place finish all the more impressive. While she might not have been voted America's favorite dancer, she certainly might be Canada's." She performed at the 2016 Teen Choice Awards as a finalist from the SYTYCD cast. She performed again on The Ellen DeGeneres Show in October 2016 as part of the Jump Dance Convention troupe.

She was featured on the cover of Dance Spirit magazine in April 2017. In May 2017, she was featured in a pas de deux in Alberta Ballet Company's production, "Our Canada" choreographed by Jean Grand-Maître. In November 2017, after performing a dance to Demi Lovato's song "Tell Me You Love Me" she was invited by Lovato to rehearse with their dancers for their performance at the American Music Awards. For the third time, she won Best Female Dancer at the 2018 Dance Awards in Las Vegas, this time in the Teen category, making her the first dancer in the competition's history to win in all categories from mini to teen. In April 2018, she choreographed and danced in the music video for the song "Just Say When" by American rock band Nothing More.

=== 2017–2020: Music beginnings and "You Broke Me First" ===
Since its creation in 2011, McRae's YouTube channel has featured primarily dance videos. However, in 2017, she began a video series showcasing original songs she wrote and recorded in her bedroom. The first song she released as part of the series, "One Day", attracted over 40 million views, prompting her to self-release the song as her independent debut single. The song would eventually be certified gold in Canada, marking her first certification. From 2017 to 2019, McRae continued to upload and release independent singles leading to her being named YouTube's Artist on the Rise. Her singles caught the attention of record labels. In March 2019, she released the standalone single, "Kids Are Alright".

McRae signed with RCA Records in August 2019, and released the singles "Tear Myself Apart", "All My Friends Are Fake" and "Stupid". The songs would become the only singles released from her then-forthcoming debut EP. "Stupid" charted in Ireland and Canada, earning significant radio airplay performance in the latter, peaking within the top 15 of the Canadian pop radio charts. "Stupid" was certified gold in Canada. McRae released her debut EP, All the Things I Never Said, on January 24, 2020, and announced her All the Things I Never Said Tour, headlining Europe and North America. Each stop on the tour was sold out. The tour received positive reviews.

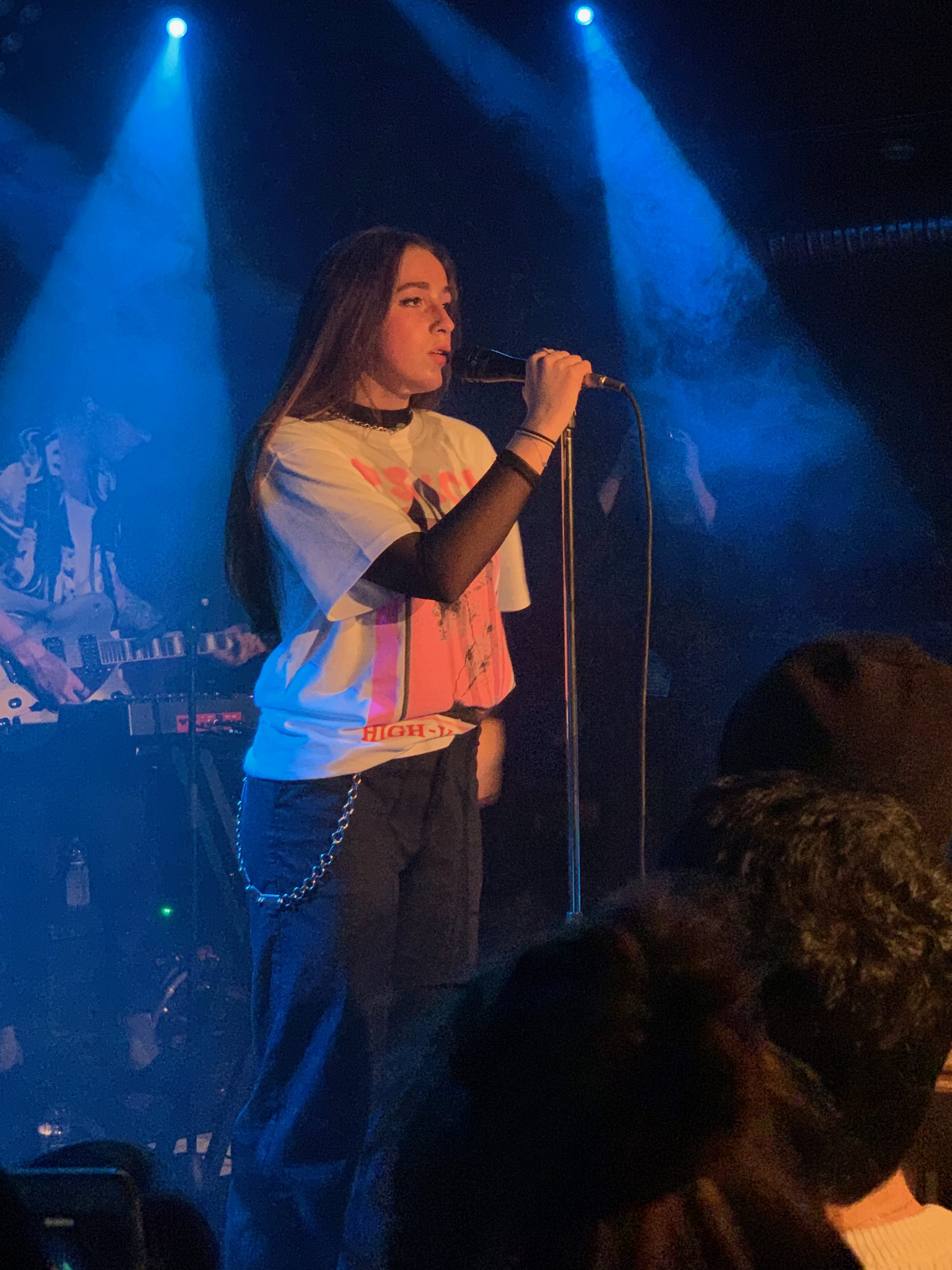
McRae performing in Berlin in February 2020

In April 2020, McRae released the single "You Broke Me First" which retroactively became the lead single from her then-forthcoming second EP. The song was an international success, peaking within the top ten of the charts in several countries, including Australia, the Netherlands, and the United Kingdom, and becoming her first single to chart on the Billboard Hot 100 in the United States. It was also the longest charting song released by a female artist in 2020 on the Billboard Hot 100, at 38 weeks. It peaked at number one on the Mediabase Top 40 chart, breaking the record for the longest climb to number one by a female solo artist at 28 weeks. She also performed the song on Jimmy Kimmel Live!, and The Tonight Show Starring Jimmy Fallon. Towards the end of the year, following the success of "You Broke Me First", she signed a worldwide publishing deal with Sony/ATV.

Throughout the rest of 2020, McRae released a string of standalone singles including "Vicious" featuring American rapper Lil Mosey in June, "Don't Be Sad" in August, "Lie to Me" with Canadian singer Ali Gatie in October, and "R U OK" in December; the latter retroactively became the second single from her second EP.

In September, McRae was nominated for the MTV Video Music Award for Push Best New Artist, and performed "You Broke Me First" at the VMAs pre-show. That same month, she was also featured on the cover of Dork magazine. McRae gained notable recognition as a rising artist in 2020, being named YouTube's Artist on the Rise, MTV's Push Artist for July, and a Vevo DSCVR artist. She was also featured on Billboard's 21 Under 21 One to Watch list and named by Pandora, The Independent, NME, Amazon Music, and Uproxx as an artist to watch in 2021. In December 2020, she was the youngest person listed in the Forbes 30 Under 30 list in the music category. In the same month, she was named one of Rolling Stone's top ten biggest breakthrough artists of 2020, and featured on TikTok's "The Come Up: Emerging Artists" list as one of the top emerging artists on the platform. She was also featured on Harper's Bazaar's On the Rise series.

McRae's rise to mainstream popularity was unusual because much of it happened during early COVID-19 restrictions, which led David Friend, a music reporter at The Canadian Press, to call her "a bonafide star of the lockdown". Her performances on late night and awards shows were often done in isolation and studios, including the virtual edition of MTV's European music awards. She said this led her to sometimes disassociate herself from the fame she was experiencing in isolation.

=== 2021–2022: I Used to Think I Could Fly ===
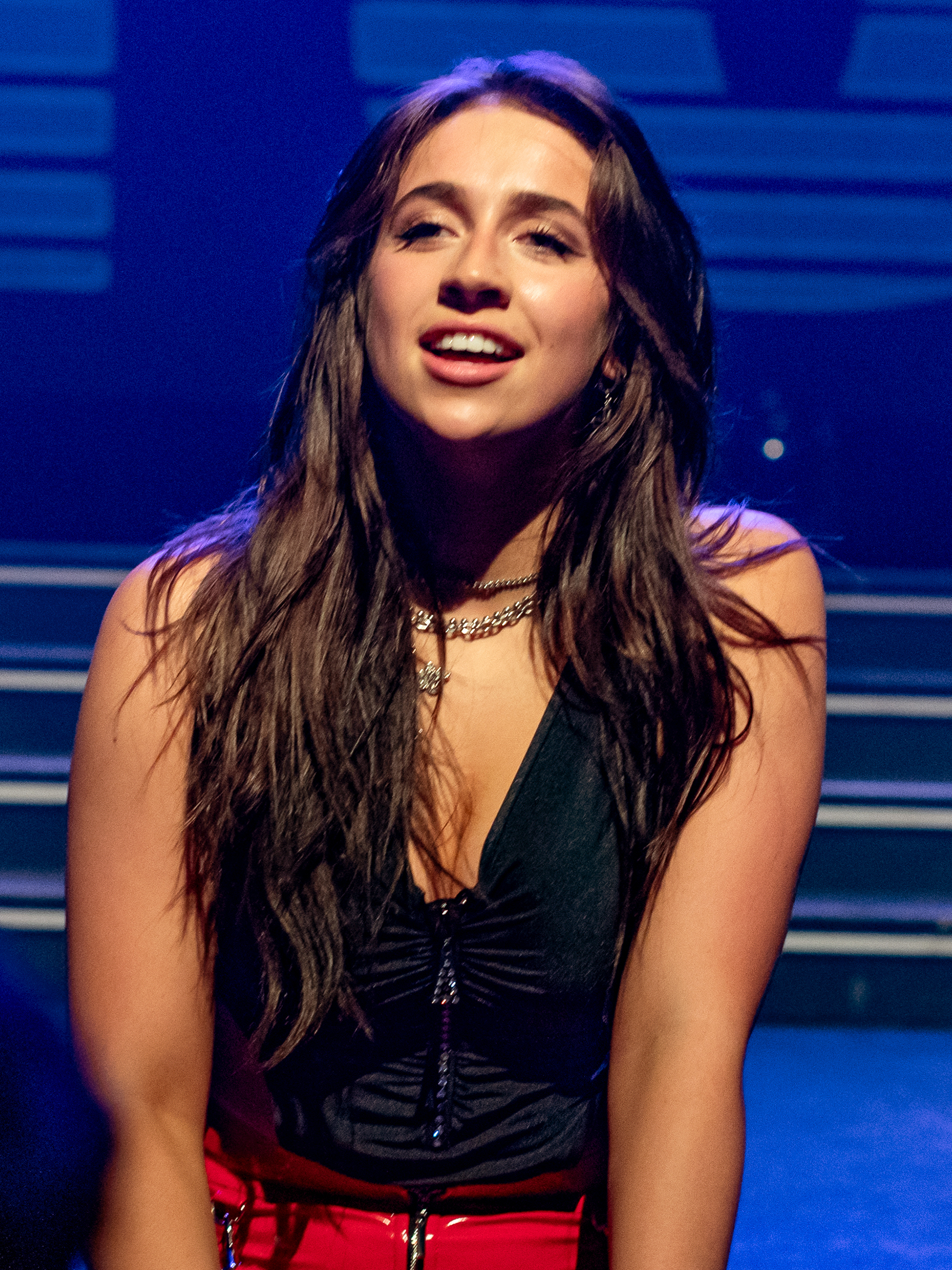
McRae performing in 2022

In January 2021, McRae released the song "Rubberband", which retroactively became the eventual third single from her then-upcoming second EP. On March 3, 2021, alongside a promotional single titled "Slower", McRae announced that her second EP, Too Young to Be Sad, would be released on March 26, 2021. Upon release, the EP received positive reviews, debuted at number 94 on the US Billboard 200. At the end of 2021, the album amassed over one billion streams on Spotify, becoming the most streamed EP that year by a female artist. The EP was nominated for Album of the Year and Pop Album of the Year at the 2022 Juno Awards. McRae received two Juno Award nominations, and was announced as an Apple Music Up Next artist.

In April, McRae featured on the song "You" alongside Regard and Troye Sivan. On May 8, 2021, McRae performed a global virtual show, "Too Young to Be Sad", which was praised. Later that month, McRae signed her first endorsement deal with Essentia Water, was nominated for the Social Star Award at the iHeartRadio Music Awards, and featured on the soundtrack of the Amazon original series Panic with the track "Darkest Hour". In June, McRae was featured on the song "U Love U" by Blackbear, and released the song "Working" with Khalid. In October, she was featured on the Billboard 21 under 21 list for 2021 and People magazine's One to Watch list for 2021. McRae was featured on the cover of Numéro in November 2021.

"That Way", a track from her debut EP, experienced a resurgence in late 2021 after going viral on TikTok and charted in the UK, and Ireland. In September 2021, McRae released a remix of "That Way" with Jeremy Zucker. In November 2021, McRae released "Feel Like Shit", the lead single off her then-forthcoming debut album which she began teasing earlier that same year.

In February 2022, McRae released "She's All I Wanna Be", the second single from her then-forthcoming debut album. The song found commercial success and reached the top 10 in Canada, Ireland, Norway, Singapore, and Belgium. It also charted in the top 40 in several countries. The song debuted at number 52 in the US, becoming her highest debut on the Hot 100 at the time. That same month, McRae was announced as a brand ambassador for Maybelline and the face of their new Vinyl Ink liquid lip color. McRae released "Chaotic" as the third single in March and released "What Would You Do?" as the fourth single in May. McRae announced that her debut album I Used to Think I Could Fly, would be released on May 27, 2022. The album received positive reviews from music critics and debuted at number three in Canada and 13 in the US.

In September 2022, McRae released the follow-up single "Uh Oh". In November, she featured on Tiësto's "10:35", released for the opening of the luxury resort Atlantis The Royal, Dubai. Towards the end of 2022, McRae began to express interest in a more pop music-oriented sound, describing her forthcoming work a "new chapter".

=== 2023–present: Think Later and So Close to What ===
By August 2023, McRae began teasing a new song. On September 15, 2023, she released her song "Greedy" which became her biggest debut on Spotify to date, and her first top 10 on the Global Spotify Charts. The song peaked at the top of the Canadian Hot 100, and debuted at the top of the charts in Denmark and Norway. "Greedy" also topped the charts in several other countries, including Australia and the Netherlands, as well as the Billboard Global 200, making it her first official number one single worldwide. The song also peaked within the top ten in several countries, including France, Iceland, New Zealand, and the United Kingdom. "Greedy" also became her first song to chart within the top ten of the Billboard Hot 100 in the United States, peaking at number three. It also became the year-end number one song of 2024 on the US Pop Airplay chart after peaking at number one for eight weeks total. The song was a commercial success and acted as the lead single off her then-upcoming sophomore studio album. In November, she released a follow-up single titled "Exes", which also peaked top ten in Canada.

McRae released her sophomore studio album, Think Later, on December 8, 2023. The album received positive reviews and was described as a "career-defining shift" for McRae. It debuted in the top five of the charts worldwide including number four on the US Billboard 200, earning 66,000 album-equivalent units in its first week, of which 8,000 were pure album sales; This marked McRae's first top-ten album in the US. McRae won the Juno Award for Artist of the Year, and Single of the Year for "Greedy" at the 2024 Juno Awards. In late 2023, McRae made her Saturday Night Live debut performing "Greedy" and a then-unreleased song titled "Grave". Throughout the rest of 2023 and early 2024, McRae went on to perform "Greedy" at various award shows including the Billboard Music Awards, the 2024 NHL All-Star Game, the Brit Awards, and the iHeartRadio Music Awards.

In September 2024, McRae released the single "It's OK I'm OK" which found commercial success, charting in several countries worldwide and becoming her highest charting debut on the Billboard Hot 100 at number 20. She followed with a second single "2 Hands" in November which peaked at number 41 on the Hot 100 and 22 in Canada. Alongside the second single, McRae announced her third studio album, So Close to What, released on February 21, 2025, along with plans for the Miss Possessive Tour, which commenced on March 18 of the same year. So Close to What became McRae's first number one album on Billboard 200. Her third single, "Sports Car", was released on January 24, 2025. The song peaked at number nine on the Canadian Hot 100, and also peaked within the top ten of the charts in Australia, Ireland, New Zealand, and the United Kingdom. McRae made her first couch appearance on The Tonight Show Starring Jimmy Fallon on February 25, as an interview guest where she taught him how to do the "It's OK I'm OK" dance. She returned to The Tonight Show on March 5, 2025, to perform "Revolving Door", returning as a performer for the third time. She performed on Saturday Night Live for the second time on March 1, performing "Sports Car" and "Dear God".

In May 2025, McRae was featured on Morgan Wallen's "What I Want", taken from his studio album I'm the Problem (2025). The song debuted at number one on the Billboard Hot 100, becoming her first number one single. That same month, "Just Keep Watching" was released, and was included on the F1 soundtrack, which was released on June 27, 2025. The song earned McRae her first Grammy Award nomination for Best Dance Pop Recording. She performed at the Capital Summertime Ball on Sunday June 15 at Wembley Stadium, in the midst of the Miss Possessive Tour. On September 9, 2025, McRae performed "Revolving Door" and "Sports Car" at the 2025 MTV VMAs and won two awards for "Just Keep Watching". McRae later performed in Las Vegas on September 19, 2025, as part of the iHeartRadio Music Festival. McRae announced a new single, "Tit for Tat", which was released on September 26, 2025, and was reportedly about her ex-boyfriend the Kid Laroi. A deluxe version of So Close to What was released on November 21, 2025. In October 2026, McRae released her song "Housewife", as the lead single from her upcoming fourth studio album. On October 1, 2026, McRae launched her perfume line Tate 01 in partnership with U.S.-based Ulta Beauty cosmetic chain. It is distributed by the department chain Target in the US and by the French Sephora cosmetic chain in Canada, where it was launched on October 30.

== Personal life ==
From late 2021 to early 2023, McRae was in a relationship with Columbus Blue Jackets player Cole Sillinger. In April 2024, Australian rapper and singer the Kid Laroi confirmed he was in a relationship with McRae. They collaborated on the song "I Know Love" from her 2025 album So Close to What. The couple broke up in July 2025. As of 2025, McRae lives in New York after previously living in California.

=== Activism ===
McRae has expressed appreciation for her LGBTQ+ fans, calling them her "favorite" and "number ones" in a 2025 interview with Pride. She also highlighted the importance of LGBTQ+ members of her creative team, valuing their honesty and input in her music.

Through initiatives such as her "Little Miss Possessive" merchandise campaign, which donated a portion of the proceeds to The Trevor Project and Global Fund for Women, McRae has supported organizations connected to LGBTQ+ youth and women's rights. She has stated that she prefers to express her values through her actions and the causes she supports rather than through public political statements.

== Artistry ==
=== Musical style and influences ===
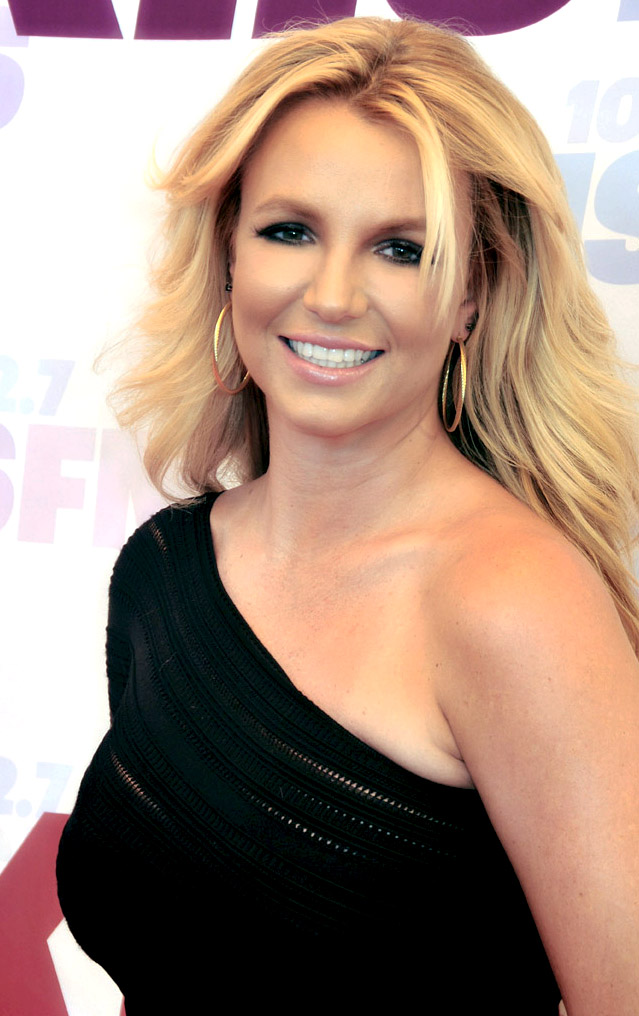
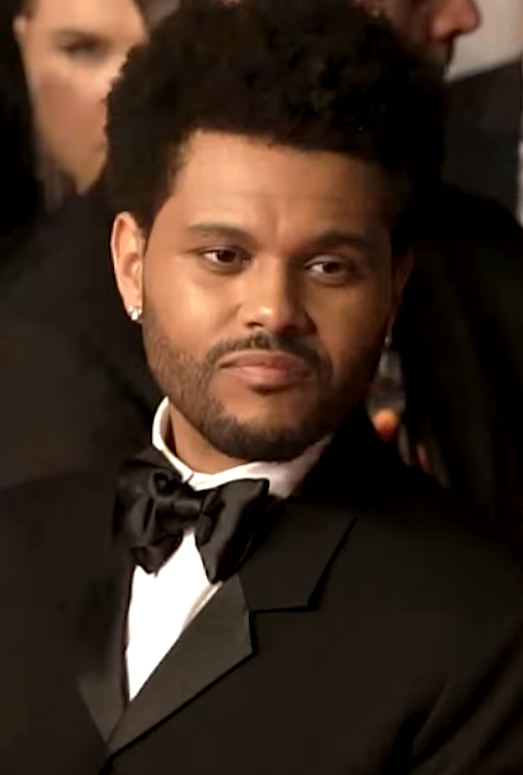
McRae credits artists such as Britney Spears (left) and The Weeknd (right) as her influences.

McRae's music incorporates pop, alternative pop and dance-pop with elements of R&B and soul. She has named Lana Del Rey, Ariana Grande, Post Malone, The Weeknd, Khalid, Jessie Reyez and Jeremy Zucker as her biggest musical influences. She cites Zendaya and Dua Lipa as all-around influences, and has described both women as her biggest idols, noting that she looks up to them in all aspects of life. She has also named Bruno Mars, Madonna, Christina Aguilera, Britney Spears, Beyoncé, Ciara, Jennifer Lopez, and Justin Timberlake as inspirations for bringing dance into her performances, while naming Taylor Swift, Julia Michaels and Alec Benjamin as songwriting inspirations. Further, McRae has called herself a "huge fan" of Swift and described her as "one of the greatest songwriters". McRae has also expressed an admiration for Billie Eilish and Rosalía.

=== Public image ===
McRae has been described as "the teen dance star turned future pop idol" by i-D, "the new teen queen" by Notion, "Canada's answer to Billie Eilish" by Elle, and "one of pop's bright young hopes" by The Independent. She has also been noted for her honest lyrics, "impressive" vocals and relatable music. Additionally, McRae has received considerable acclaim as a dancer and has been praised by artist, dancer and choreographer Paula Abdul, who declared her a "gift from God", as well as choreographers such as Stacey Tookey and Blake McGrath, both of whom stated that she is talented beyond her years, with the latter describing McRae as "one of the best dancers he has ever worked with". Two-time Emmy winner Travis Wall has named her as one of his muses. Margaret Fuhrer of Dance Spirit magazine described her dancing as both technically and artistically virtuosic. As of January 2026, McRae's YouTube channel has amassed over 2.9 billion views, and she has garnered more than 8.4 billion career streams across all platforms.

== Discography ==
- I Used to Think I Could Fly (2022)
- Think Later (2023)
- So Close to What (2025)

== Filmography ==
List of film performances
| Year | Title | Role | Notes | Ref(s) |
|---|---|---|---|---|
| 2013 | Lala-Oopsies: A Sew Magical Tale | Princess Nutmeg | Voice | |
| 2014 | Annie | Orphan #17 | Uncredited | |
| 2014 | Lalaloopsy Ponies: The Big Show | Spot Splatter Splash | Voice | |
| 2015 | Lalaloopsy: Band Together | Spot Splatter Splash | Voice | |

== Tours ==
=== Headlining tours ===
- Are We Flying Tour (2022–2023)
- Think Later World Tour (2024)
- Miss Possessive Tour (2025)

=== Promotional tours ===
- All the Things I Never Said Tour (2020)

== See also ==
- List of So You Think You Can Dance finalists
- List of YouTubers
