= Rubberband (Tate McRae song) =

2021 single by Tate McRae

Single by Tate McRae

from the EP Too Young to Be Sad
- Released: January 20, 2021
- Length: 2:27
- Label: RCA
- Songwriters: Andrew Goldstein; Jacob Kasher Hindlin; Natalie Solomon; Tate McRae; Victoria Zaro
- Producers: Andrew Goldstein; Naliya

Tate McRae singles chronology
| "R U OK" (2020) | "Rubberband" (2021) | "Bad Ones" (2021) |

"Rubberband" is a song by Canadian singer Tate McRae. It was released on January 20, 2021 through RCA Records as the third single from McRae's second extended play, Too Young to Be Sad. The song was written by McRae, Andrew Goldstein, Jacob Kasher Hindlin, Natalie Solomon and Victoria Zaro.

== Background ==
Tate McRae teased the song's lyrics and its release date on Twitter prior to its release, and also uploaded a snippet of the song on TikTok. In an interview with Zane Lowe of Apple Music, in explaining the concept of the song, she remarked, "there's this thing when people get addicted to something or they're trying to overcome it, they have little fidgets, something that they do to distract themselves. And a lot of people actually put rubber bands on their wrist and snap it when they want something, and I thought it was a really cool concept to think about it in a love perspective".

== Critical reception ==
Sarah Jamieson of DIY described the song as a "slick but pulsating effort" and noted that it showcases McRae's "astute talent for creating modern heartbreak anthems". Bailey Slater of Wonderland described the track as a replay worthy bop which showcases McRae's "silky smooth vocal range and masterful way with words in equal measure". Laura Freyaldenhoven of music site, 'WhentheHornBlows' remarked that the song combines "atmospheric beats with disarming vocals" and "thrills with an intoxicating kind of vulnerability", further stating that the "glass ceilings made of glistening synths layered over a gentle bassline wrap Tate's delicate lyricism into a soothing soundscape that feels intimate yet distinctly cinematic as she recalls coping with the end of a relationship". Emma Holbrook of music magazine The Forty-Five described the song as emotionally charged synth pop with an unbelievably catchy hook and remarked that the song fuses "bone-deep synths and a beat that snaps abruptly like a rubberband against your wrist, with the guilt and longing and pain you feel when you're protecting someone else".

== Personnel ==
Credits adapted from Tidal.

- Andrew Goldstein – producer, lyricist
- Naliya – producer
- Jacob Kasher – lyricist
- Natalie Solomon – lyricist
- Tate McRae – lyricist, associated performer
- Victoria Zaro – lyricist
- Dave Kutch – mastering engineer
- Jeff Juliano – mixing engineer

== Charts ==
Chart performance for "Rubberband"
| Chart (2021) | Peak position |
|---|---|
| Canada Hot 100 (Billboard) | 91 |
| New Zealand Hot Singles (RMNZ) | 16 |

== Certifications ==
Certifications for "Rubberband"
| Region | Certification | Certified units/sales |
|---|---|---|
| Canada (Music Canada) | Gold | 40,000^{‡} |
| United States (RIAA) | Gold | 500,000^{‡} |
^{‡} Sales+streaming figures based on certification alone.

== Release history ==
Release dates and formats for "Rubberband"
| Region | Date | Format(s) | Label | Ref. |
|---|---|---|---|---|
| Various | January 20, 2021 | Digital download; streaming | RCA | |
