= You Broke Me First =

Single by Tate McRae

from the EP Too Young to Be Sad
- Released: April 17, 2020
- Genre: Downtempo; indie pop; synth-pop; bedroom pop
- Length: 2:49
- Label: RCA
- Songwriters: Tate McRae; Blake Harnage; Victoria Zaro
- Producer: Blake Harnage

Tate McRae singles chronology
| "Boys Ain't Shit" (2020) | "You Broke Me First" (2020) | "Vicious" (2020) |

Music video
- “You Broke Me First” on YouTube

"You Broke Me First" is a song by Canadian singer Tate McRae. It was released on April 17, 2020, through RCA Records as the lead single from her second extended play, Too Young to Be Sad (2021). The song gained popularity on the video-sharing platform TikTok, where it has featured in over a million videos. The song is one of the most streamed songs released by a female artist in 2020. The song reached mainstream US radio on August 4, 2020.

"You Broke Me First" peaked at number eight on the Canadian Hot 100. Outside of Canada, "You Broke Me First" peaked within the top ten of the charts in Australia, Belgium (Flanders), Finland, Ireland, Malaysia, the Netherlands, Norway, Singapore, Sweden, and the United Kingdom, while charting at number seventeen in the United States.

== Composition and lyrics ==
"You Broke Me First" is a downtempo indie pop, bedroom pop, and synth-pop song with trap influences. McRae recalls her lyric "But I don't really care how bad it hurts, cause you broke me first" being praised by songwriter Victoria Zaro and producer Blake Harnage while in the studio. She says that writing and recording the song was a "super quick process". Through the song, McRae expresses that she refuses to feel sympathetic for an ex-partner. She told Anna Rose of NME,

"This song is about someone in a relationship who couldn't care less for the other person and then 6 months later decides to crawl back. It's the feeling of knowing how much they meant to you, but this time not letting them back in".

McRae also revealed to Hollywood Life that the song is lyrically connected to its single successor, "Vicious".

== Reception ==
"You Broke Me First" received critical acclaim from critics, who praised McRae's vocal performance, the production and honest lyricism. Multiple critics wrote that the song was McRae's most personal to date, with some describing it as a "hard-hitting ballad". McRae reacted to the acclaim from fans and critics, saying she was "super happy that other people are connecting with the song too".

== Commercial performance ==
In the United Kingdom, "You Broke Me First" debuted at number 66 on the UK Singles Chart and later climbed to number five on the chart, becoming McRae's first top ten entry in Britain. The song later peaked at number three on the chart.

In the Republic of Ireland, the song entered the Irish Singles Chart three weeks before and eventually rose to number nine, becoming the first top ten peak in her career. The song later peaked at number three on the chart.

In New Zealand, the song entered at number 18 on the Hot Singles Chart upon its initial release, before debuting at number 34 on the New Zealand Singles Chart several weeks later amid its popularization. It peaked at number 12 on the chart.

In the United States, the song would also become her first chart entry on the Billboard Hot 100, peaking at number 17. When it reached number 40 in its 20th week, the song attained the third-slowest climb to the top 40 by a female artist, after Norah Jones's "Don't Know Why" and KT Tunstall's "Suddenly I See". The track peaked at number 2 on the Mainstream Top 40 chart and number 1 on the US Mediabase top 40 chart, becoming her first number one single and breaking the record for the longest climb to number 1 by a female solo artist at 28 weeks on the latter chart. "You Broke Me First" is also the longest-charting song released by a female artist in 2020 on the Billboard Hot 100, at 38 weeks.

The song's co-writer Victoria Zaro publishing copyright was sold at auction for $1,250,000.

== Live performances ==
McRae performed the song at the 2020 MTV Video Music Awards. In October, she performed the song on Jimmy Kimmel Live!. In November, McRae performed the song at the 2020 MTV Europe Music Awards and was praised by NME and Billboard for being one of the stand out performers. In January 2021, she performed the song on The Tonight Show Starring Jimmy Fallon. McRae performed the song on January 30, 2025 at Intuit Dome in Inglewood, California for FireAid to help with relief efforts for the January 2025 Southern California wildfires.

== Personnel ==
Credits adapted from Tidal:

- Blake Harnage – producer, composer, lyricist, recording engineer
- Tate McRae – composer, lyricist
- Victoria Zaro – composer, lyricist
- Dave Kutch – mastering engineer
- Jeff Juliano – mixing engineer

== Charts ==
=== Weekly charts ===
Weekly chart performance for "You Broke Me First"
| Chart (2020–2021) | Peak position |
|---|---|
| Australia (ARIA) | 7 |
| Austria (Ö3 Austria Top 40) | 15 |
| Belgium (Ultratop 50 Flanders) | 4 |
| Belgium (Ultratop 50 Wallonia) | 3 |
| Canada Hot 100 (Billboard) | 8 |
| Canada CHR/Top 40 (Billboard) | 4 |
| Canada Hot AC (Billboard) | 9 |
| Canada AC (Billboard) | 18 |
| Czech Republic Airplay (ČNS IFPI) | 17 |
| Czech Republic Singles Digital (ČNS IFPI) | 14 |
| Denmark (Tracklisten) | 14 |
| Euro Digital Song Sales (Billboard) | 8 |
| Finland (Suomen virallinen lista) | 8 |
| France (SNEP) | 58 |
| Germany (GfK) | 19 |
| Greece (IFPI) | 11 |
| Global 200 (Billboard) | 16 |
| Hungary (Rádiós Top 40) | 27 |
| Hungary (Single Top 40) | 35 |
| Hungary (Stream Top 40) | 11 |
| Iceland (Tónlistinn) | 32 |
| Ireland (IRMA) | 3 |
| Lithuania (AGATA) | 12 |
| Malaysia (RIM) | 4 |
| Mexico Ingles Airplay (Billboard) | 14 |
| Netherlands (Dutch Top 40) | 4 |
| Netherlands (Single Top 100) | 10 |
| New Zealand (Recorded Music NZ) | 12 |
| Norway (VG-lista) | 4 |
| Poland Airplay (ZPAV) | 44 |
| Portugal (AFP) | 23 |
| Romania (Airplay 100) | 16 |
| Scottish Singles Sales (Official Charts) | 3 |
| Singapore (RIAS) | 6 |
| Slovakia Singles Digital (ČNS IFPI) | 18 |
| Slovakia Airplay (ČNS IFPI) | 31 |
| Slovenia (SloTop50) | 25 |
| Sweden (Sverigetopplistan) | 7 |
| Switzerland (Schweizer Hitparade) | 13 |
| UK Singles (Official Charts) | 3 |
| US Billboard Hot 100 | 17 |
| US Adult Contemporary (Billboard) | 15 |
| US Adult Pop Airplay (Billboard) | 4 |
| US Dance Airplay (Billboard) | 1 |
| US Pop Airplay (Billboard) | 2 |
| US Rolling Stone Top 100 | 25 |

=== Year-end charts ===
2020 year-end chart performance for "You Broke Me First"
| Chart (2020) | Position |
|---|---|
| Australia (ARIA) | 50 |
| Austria (Ö3 Austria Top 40) | 56 |
| Belgium (Ultratop Flanders) | 57 |
| Denmark (Tracklisten) | 65 |
| Hungary (Stream Top 40) | 36 |
| Ireland (IRMA) | 33 |
| Netherlands (Dutch Top 40) | 56 |
| Netherlands (Single Top 100) | 64 |
| Norway (VG-lista) | 25 |
| Portugal (AFP) | 139 |
| Sweden (Sverigetopplistan) | 37 |
| Switzerland (Schweizer Hitparade) | 64 |
| UK Singles (OCC) | 56 |

2021 year-end chart performance for "You Broke Me First"
| Chart (2021) | Position |
|---|---|
| Australia (ARIA) | 27 |
| Austria (Ö3 Austria Top 40) | 63 |
| Belgium (Ultratop Flanders) | 60 |
| Belgium (Ultratop Wallonia) | 27 |
| Canada (Canadian Hot 100) | 16 |
| Denmark (Tracklisten) | 65 |
| Germany (Official German Charts) | 55 |
| Global 200 (Billboard) | 34 |
| Hungary (Stream Top 40) | 64 |
| Ireland (IRMA) | 42 |
| Netherlands (Dutch Top 40) | 62 |
| Netherlands (Single Top 100) | 100 |
| Portugal (AFP) | 92 |
| Sweden (Sverigetopplistan) | 60 |
| Switzerland (Schweizer Hitparade) | 80 |
| UK Singles (OCC) | 62 |
| US Billboard Hot 100 | 37 |
| US Adult Contemporary (Billboard) | 39 |
| US Adult Top 40 (Billboard) | 18 |
| US Dance/Mix Show Airplay (Billboard) | 1 |
| US Mainstream Top 40 (Billboard) | 17 |

== Certifications ==
Certifications for "You Broke Me First"
| Region | Certification | Certified units/sales |
|---|---|---|
| Australia (ARIA) | 8× Platinum | 560,000^{‡} |
| Austria (IFPI Austria) | 3× Platinum | 90,000^{‡} |
| Belgium (BRMA) | Platinum | 40,000^{‡} |
| Brazil (Pro-Música Brasil) | Diamond | 160,000^{‡} |
| Canada (Music Canada) | 9× Platinum | 720,000^{‡} |
| Denmark (IFPI Danmark) | 2× Platinum | 180,000^{‡} |
| France (SNEP) | Diamond | 333,333^{‡} |
| Germany (BVMI) | Platinum | 400,000^{‡} |
| Italy (FIMI) | Platinum | 100,000^{‡} |
| New Zealand (RMNZ) | 5× Platinum | 150,000^{‡} |
| Norway (IFPI Norway) | 4× Platinum | 240,000^{‡} |
| Poland (ZPAV) | 2× Platinum | 40,000^{‡} |
| Portugal (AFP) | Platinum | 10,000^{‡} |
| Spain (Promusicae) | Platinum | 60,000^{‡} |
| Switzerland (IFPI Switzerland) | Platinum | 20,000^{‡} |
| United Kingdom (BPI) | 3× Platinum | 1,800,000^{‡} |
| United States (RIAA) | 6× Platinum | 6,000,000^{‡} |
Streaming
| Greece (IFPI Greece) | Gold | 1,000,000^{†} |
| Sweden (GLF) | 3× Platinum | 24,000,000^{†} |
^{‡} Sales+streaming figures based on certification alone.^{†} Streaming-only figures based on certification alone.

== Release history ==
Release dates and formats for "You Broke Me First"
| Region | Date | Format(s) | Version | Label | Ref. |
|---|---|---|---|---|---|
| Various | 17 April 2020 | Digital download; streaming | Original | RCA | |
| Various | 1 June 2020 | Digital download; streaming | Luca Schreiner remix | RCA | |
| Various | 1 June 2020 | Digital download; streaming | Gryffin remix | RCA | |
| United States | 4 August 2020 | Contemporary hit radio | Original | RCA | |
| Italy | 23 October 2020 | Contemporary hit radio | Original | Sony | |

== Cover versions ==
Dutch electronic music duo Dash Berlin released a cover of the song in September 2021.

== See also ==
- List of Billboard number-one dance songs of 2020
- List of Billboard number-one dance songs of 2021
