= Drive (Tiësto album) =

Studio album by Tiësto
- Released: 21 April 2023
- Recorded: 2020–2022
- Length: 31:54
- Labels: Musical Freedom; Atlantic
- Producers: Sebastian Atas; Viktor Broberg; Teemu Brunila; Mikkel Christiansen; Tom Dekkers; Luke Fitton; Goldfingers; Paul Harris; Hightower; James Hurr; Julia Karlsson; Lostboy; Mearsy; Ryan Tedder; Toby Scott; Victor Sjöström; Niklas Strandbråten; Svidden; Tiësto

Tiësto chronology
Together Again (2021)	Drive (2023)

Singles from Drive
- 1. "The Business" Released: September 25, 2020; 2. "Don't Be Shy" Released: August 12, 2021; 3. "The Motto" Released: November 4, 2021; 4. "Hot in It" Released: June 30, 2022; 5. "Pump It Louder" Released: October 7, 2022; 6. "10:35" Released: November 3, 2022; 7. "Lay Low" Released: January 6, 2023; 8. "All Nighter" Released: March 9, 2023

Drive is the seventh studio album by Dutch DJ Tiësto, released on 21 April 2023 through Atlantic Records. The album features collaborations from Ava Max, Black Eyed Peas, Tate McRae, Charli XCX, Karol G, among others. The album contains the singles "The Business", "Don't Be Shy", "The Motto", "Hot in It", "Pump It Louder", "10:35", "Lay Low", and "All Nighter". On 2 June 2023, "Yesterday" was released as a promotional single.

Drive debuted at number 87 on the US Billboard 200, including number 2 on the Top Dance/Electronic Albums chart with 15,000 album-equivalent units.

== Track listing ==
Drive track listing
No.	Title	Writer(s)	Producer(s)	Length
1.	"Chills (LA Hills)" (with A Boogie wit da Hoodie)	Tijs Verwest; Artist Dubose; Sebastian Atas; Victor Sjöström; Viktor Broberg	Tiësto; Atas; Sjöström; Broberg	3:03
2.	"The Motto" (with Ava Max)	Verwest; Peter Rycroft; Pablo Bowman; Claudia Valentina; Sarah Blanchard; Amanda Koçi	Tiësto; Lostboy; Cirkut^{[v]}	2:44
3.	"10:35" (with Tate McRae)	Verwest; Rycroft; Ryan Tedder; Scott Harris; Amy Allen; Tate McRae	Tiësto; Lostboy; Tedder	2:52
4.	"The Business"	Verwest; Julia Karlsson; Anton Rundberg; James Bell	Tiësto; Hightower; Karlsson^{[v]}	2:44
5.	"All Nighter"	Verwest; Joseph Taylor; Sam Gray; Chris Mears	Tiësto; Mearsy	2:14
6.	"Hot in It" (featuring Charli XCX)	Verwest; Charlotte Aitchison; Hight; Kiddo; Frank Nobel; Linus Nordstrom	Tiësto; Goldfingers; Bart Schoudel	2:09
7.	"Pump It Louder" (with Black Eyed Peas)	Will Adams; Allan Pineda; Stacy Ferguson; Nicholas Roubanis; Thomas Van Musser	Tiësto	2:38
8.	"Learn 2 Love"	Verwest; Paul Harris; James Hurr; Hayley May	Tiësto; Harris; Hurr	2:13
9.	"Don't Be Shy" (with Karol G)	Verwest; Carolina Giraldo; Teemu Brunila; Jonas David Kröper; Yoshi Breen	Tiësto; Brunila	2:20
10.	"Bet My Dollar" (with Freya Ridings)	Verwest; Luke Fitton; Freya Ridings	Tiësto; Fitton; Cameron Gower Poole^{[v]}	3:24
11.	"Back Around" (with AR/CO)	Verwest; Leo Stannard; Mali-Koa Hood; Harris; Toby Scott	Tiësto; Harris; Scott	2:55
12.	"Lay Low"	Verwest; Erik Smaaland; Dag Holtan-Hartwig; Halvor Folstad; Mikkel Christiansen; Niklas Strandbråten	Tiësto; Christiansen; Strandbråten; Tom Dekkers	2:33
13.	"Yesterday"	Verwest; Rundberg; Jimmy Koitzsch; Bell; Karlsson	Tiësto; Hightower; Svidden; Karlsson	2:20
Total length:				31:54

Notes

- ^{^[v]} signifies a vocal producer.
- "Pump It Louder" contains elements from:
  - "Pump It", written by Will Adams, Allan Pineda, Stacy Ferguson, Nicholas Roubanis, and Thomas Van Musser, and performed by Black Eyed Peas
  - "Misirlou", performed by Dick Dale
- The physical edition and first digital release of the album have several differences:
  - The track order is changed for several tracks.
  - "Bet My Dollar" is titled "I'd Bet".
  - "Lay Low" is not included in the track listing.

== Personnel ==
- Tiësto – mixing (tracks 1, 4, 7, 10, 12, 13)
- Tom Norris – mixing (tracks 2, 3, 5, 6)
- Kevin Grainger – mixing (track 8)
- Rob Kinelski – mixing (track 9)
- A Boogie wit da Hoodie – vocals (track 1)
- Lostboy – all instrumentation, programming (tracks 2, 3)
- Ava Max – vocals (track 2)
- Pablo Bowman – background vocals (track 2)
- Tate McRae – vocals (track 3)
- Ryan Tedder – guitar, background vocals (track 3)
- Amy Allen – background vocals (track 3)
- Yami – vocals (tracks 4, 12)
- Anton Rundberg – programming (tracks 4, 13); drums, keyboards, bass, strings (4); all instrumentation (13)
- Sam Gray – vocals (track 5)
- Charli XCX – vocals (track 6)
- Tim Deal – keyboards, programming (track 6)
- Hayley May – vocals (track 8)
- Karol G – vocals (track 9)
- Teemu Brunila – keyboards, programming (track 9)
- Freya Ridings – vocals (track 10)
- AR/CO – vocals (track 11)
- Halvor Folstad – vocals (track 12)
- Svidden – programming, all instrumentation (track 13)

== Charts ==
=== Weekly charts ===
Weekly chart performance for Drive
Chart (2023–2024)	Peak position
Australian Albums (ARIA)	26
Austrian Albums (Ö3 Austria)	35
Belgian Albums (Ultratop Flanders)	40
Belgian Albums (Ultratop Wallonia)	46
Canadian Albums (Billboard)	12
Czech Albums (ČNS IFPI)	17
Dutch Albums (Album Top 100)	36
Finnish Albums (Suomen virallinen lista)	19
French Albums (SNEP)	54
German Albums (Offizielle Top 100)	38
Hungarian Albums (MAHASZ)	18
Irish Albums (Official Charts)	19
Italian Albums (FIMI)	48
Lithuanian Albums (AGATA)	6
New Zealand Albums (RMNZ)	9
Norwegian Albums (VG-lista)	6
Polish Albums (ZPAV)	27
Portuguese Albums (AFP)	57
Slovak Albums (ČNS IFPI)	11
Spanish Albums (Promusicae)	40
Swedish Albums (Sverigetopplistan)	31
Swiss Albums (Schweizer Hitparade)	19
UK Albums (Official Charts)	34
UK Dance Albums (Official Charts)	1
US Billboard 200	87
US Top Dance Albums (Billboard)	2

=== Year-end charts ===
2023 year-end chart performance for Drive
Chart (2023)	Position
Belgian Albums (Ultratop Flanders)	179
Hungarian Albums (MAHASZ)	77
US Top Dance/Electronic Albums (Billboard)	8

2024 year-end chart performance for Drive
Chart (2024)	Position
Australian Dance Albums (ARIA)	3
Belgian Albums (Ultratop Flanders)	158
Hungarian Albums (MAHASZ)	99
US Top Dance/Electronic Albums (Billboard)	6

2025 year-end chart performance for Drive
Chart (2025)	Position
US Top Dance Albums (Billboard)	19

== Certifications ==
Certifications for Drive
Region	Certification	Certified units/sales
Canada (Music Canada)	2× Platinum	160,000^{‡}
Denmark (IFPI Danmark)	Gold	10,000^{‡}
France (SNEP)	Gold	50,000^{‡}
Italy (FIMI)	Gold	25,000^{‡}
New Zealand (RMNZ)	Platinum	15,000^{‡}
United Kingdom (BPI)	Gold	100,000^{‡}
United States (RIAA)	Gold	500,000^{‡}
^{‡} Sales+streaming figures based on certification alone.

== Release history ==
Release history and formats for Drive
Region	Date	Label	Format	Catalog
Various	21 April 2023	Atlantic	Vinyl; CD; digital download; streaming	0756733207
