= The Motto (Tiësto and Ava Max song) =

2021 single by Tiësto and Ava Max

Single by Tiësto and Ava Max

from the album Drive
- Released: 4 November 2021
- Genre: Dance; EDM; pop
- Length: 2:44
- Label: Atlantic; Musical Freedom
- Composers: Tijs Verwest; Amanda Ava Koci; Peter Rycroft
- Lyricists: Claudia Valentina; Pablo Bowman; Sarah Blanchard
- Producers: Tiësto; Lostboy

Tiësto singles chronology
"Don't Be Shy" (2021)	"The Motto" (2021)	"Hot in It" (2022)

Ava Max singles chronology
"Sad Boy" (2021)	"The Motto" (2021)	"Maybe You're the Problem" (2022)

Music video
- "The Motto" on YouTube
- "The Motto" (Part II) on YouTube

Logo
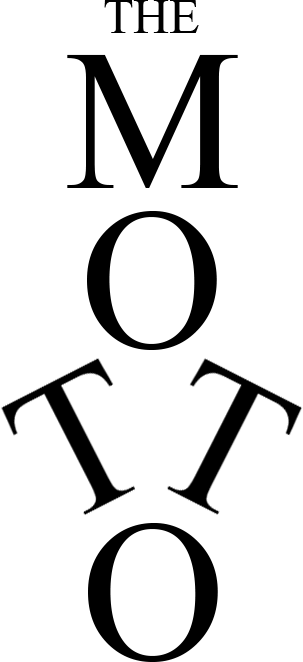

"The Motto" is a song by Dutch DJ and record producer Tiësto and American singer-songwriter Ava Max from the former's seventh studio album, Drive (2023). The song was written by the artists, Claudia Valentina, Pablo Bowman, Sarah Blanchard, and Lostboy, who produced it with the DJ. It was released as the third single from the album for digital download and streaming in various countries by Atlantic and Musical Freedom on 4 November 2021. "The Motto" is a fusion of dance, EDM, and pop, showcasing empowering lyrics that emphasize "doing you, having a good time and letting the world know". Upon its release, the release of the song was well received by music critics, who praised the music and production of the song, the collaborative effort between the artists, and the vocal delivery of Max. At the 2022 MTV Europe Music Awards, the song received a nomination in the category for the Best Collaboration.

"The Motto" achieved commercial success, reaching the top 10 in several countries, including in Belgium, Canada, Germany, Netherlands and Switzerland. The song also reached number one on the US Billboard Dance/Mix Show Airplay chart and number two on the Dance/Electronic Songs ranking. It was certified gold in four countries as well as platinum in seven countries, including in Brazil, Portugal and the United States. The song also received double platinum certifications from Music Canada in Canada and the Polish Society of the Phonographic Industry (ZPAV) in Poland. Two official music videos for the song premiered on Tiësto's YouTube channel on 4 November 2021 and 11 March 2022, respectively. The first video depicts Tiësto and Max time traveling and partying in the 1920s, with the end being inspired by the 1980 psychological horror film The Shining.

== Background and composition ==
A few days prior to its release, Tiësto and Max announced "The Motto" as their collaboration and confirmed the song's release date for 4 November 2021. The song was written by Tiësto (Tijs Verwest), Max (Amanda Ava Koci), Claudia Valentina, Lostboy (Peter Rycroft), Pablo Bowman and Sarah Blanchard, with the production completed by Tiësto and Lostboy. It was released for digital download and streaming in various countries by Atlantic and Musical Freedom on the scheduled date as the third single from Tiësto's seventh studio album Drive (2023). Talking about the song, Tiësto stated, "Ava is such an exciting young talent and her beautiful voice adds such depth to ['the song']", while Max added, "When [he] shared this record with me, I fell in love and couldn't stop playing it." Musically, "The Motto" is a dance, EDM and pop song, with an Eurodance production. According to Max, the song has an empowerment message and is about "doing you, having a good time and letting the world know".

== Critical reception ==
Ellie Mullins of We Rave You complimented the artists' collaboration, commenting that "Max's pop prowess shines spectacularly against Tiësto's signature dance soundscape". Bradley Stern of MuuMuse labeled the song as a "dance floor anthem", writing that "Max is […] refusing to let her grip on the industry loose for even a moment, this time in the form of a tag-team with the legendary Tiësto". JB of Fun Radio similarly commended the song as an "electro anthem", commenting that "[it] will remind you of [Tiësto's] prominent 'The Business' [2020], with an inflated bass line". A writer for Dancing Astronaut likewise found the song as "a welcome return to the swagged out sounds of 2020's 'The Business'". Gabriel Krongold of EDM Tunes acclaimed the song's beat, adding that "Max mixes her enthralling vocals with Tiësto's electronic magic to make a track that'll bring most everyone off their feet". A writer of Rádió 1 characterised the song as a "massive-sounding", annotating that Tiësto's "characterful house style" with Max's "brilliant vocals" created an "unbeatable pair". Another writer of Radio Eska noted the song as a "speeding banger" and "party anthem", which according to him "will not let anyone stand still". Michael Rädel of Männer considered the song an "earworm" and a "standout" from the "current monotony" of the charts. Writing for Maxim, Jordan Riefe held the view that the song "represent[ed] an evolution in [Max's] creative process". "The Motto" received a nomination in the category for the Best Collaboration at the 2022 MTV Europe Music Awards, with Max being one of three ethnic Albanian artists nominated in the same category. The song was further ranked among the most popular songs on Apple Music in 2022.

== Commercial performance ==
"The Motto" charted in several English-speaking countries after its release. In the United States, the song reached number 45 on the Billboard Hot 100 issue dated 9 April 2022, standing as Tiësto's sixth and Max's fourth entry in the ranking, and Tiësto's highest-charting song to date. It reached number one on the Dance/Mix Show Airplay, number two on the Dance/Electronic Songs and number 16 on the Mainstream Top 40 rankings. The song received a platinum certification from the Recording Industry Association of America (RIAA) for selling more than 1,000,000 equivalent copies in the US. In Canada, the song reached number six on the Canadian Hot 100 and entered the top 25 on the Canada CHR/Top 40 and Canada Hot AC rankings. It received a septuple platinum certification from Music Canada (MC) for shifting more than 560,000 units in Canada. In Australia, the song peaked at number 22 on the ARIA Singles Chart and received a double platinum certification from the Australian Recording Industry Association (ARIA) for selling more than 140,000 copies. The song reached number 12 on the UK Singles Chart in the United Kingdom and number six on the Irish Singles Chart in Ireland. It received a platinum certification from the British Phonographic Industry (BPI) for shifting more than 600,000 copies in the UK. "The Motto" also entered the charts in multiple other countries. It topped the airplay charts in the Czech Republic and Poland, and charted in the top 10 of the singles charts in Austria, Belgium, Germany, Hungary, Lithuania, Luxembourg, Netherlands, and Switzerland. The song received gold certifications France, Germany and Italy as well as platinum certifications in Austria, Brazil, Denmark, Norway, Poland and Portugal.

== Music video ==
Screenshot from the music video of "The Motto", depicting Tiësto and Max accompanied by a group of people. The scene is a reference to the American psychological horror film The Shining (1980).

To accompany the release, a music video for "The Motto" debuted to Tiësto's official YouTube channel on 4 November 2021, with a broadcast premiere on MTV Live, MTVU and ViacomCBS Times Square billboards. Directed by Christian Breslauer, the three-minute and 31-second video revolves around Tiësto and Ava Max time traveling and partying in the 1920s. It opens with a sequence of Max leaving a hotel party and a close-up shot of her entering an elevator with a glass of champagne in hand. She then presses the button for the first floor and spills the glass of champagne on the elevator control panel, which she manages to render inoperable. Next, the elevator deposits her in the lobby of a hotel in the Jazz Age and Max starts to dance and hang out around the lobby, which is filled with a number of people. After taking a luggage cart to another part of the hotel, she then joins Tiësto at a banquet, which she promptly crashes and this causes all the guests to clap and dance with her. The following sequence shows everyone posing for a group photo, which becomes a sepia-toned photograph appearing framed in the hotel lobby in the present-day hotel, as a reference to the American psychological horror film The Shining (1980). As the video ends, Max walks across the lobby in front of the photo, while telling someone on the phone, "Man, last night was crazy. It felt like a dream!"

For further promotion, a second music video for "The Motto" premiered on 11 March 2022 and was filmed in Los Angeles, California. The two-minute and 42-second video was directed and choreographed Charm La Donna and includes appearances from Cache Melvin, Caho Kitaori, Candice Savage, Darrion Gallegos, Gato Waddell, Honey Balenciaga, Joseph John Perez and Maggie Anne Wade as dancers. A third, drag version of the music video was published on Max's official YouTube channel, with scenes featuring appearances of Derrick Barry, Jaida Essence Hall, Kameron Michaels and Pangina Heals.

== Track listing ==
- Digital download and streaming
1. "The Motto" – 2:44
- Digital download and streaming – Remixes
1. "The Motto" – 2:44
2. "The Motto" (Tiësto VIP Remix) – 3:26
3. "The Motto" (Robin Schulz Remix) – 2:37
4. "The Motto" (Öwnboss Remix) – 3:13
5. "The Motto" (Nathan Dawe Remix) – 3:01

== Credits and personnel ==
Credits adapted from Spotify.

- Tiësto (Tijs Verwest) – lead artist, producing, songwriting
- Ava Max (Amanda Ava Koci) – lead artist, songwriting
- Claudia Valentina – songwriting
- Lostboy (Peter Rycroft) – producing, songwriting
- Pablo Bowman – songwriting
- Sarah Blanchard – songwriting

== Charts ==
=== Weekly charts ===
Weekly chart performance
Chart (2021 – 2022)	Peak position
Australia (ARIA)	22
Australia Dance (ARIA)	4
Austria (Ö3 Austria Top 40)	10
Belgium (Ultratop 50 Flanders)	3
Belgium (Ultratop 50 Wallonia)	5
Bulgaria International (PROPHON)	3
Canada Hot 100 (Billboard)	6
Canada CHR/Top 40 (Billboard)	2
Canada Hot AC (Billboard)	23
CIS Airplay (TopHit)	53
Croatia International Airplay (Top lista)	8
Czech Republic Airplay (ČNS IFPI)	1
Czech Republic Singles Digital (ČNS IFPI)	10
Denmark (Tracklisten)	22
Finland (Suomen virallinen lista)	7
France (SNEP)	60
Germany (GfK)	10
Global 200 (Billboard)	17
Greece International (IFPI)	5
Hungary (Rádiós Top 40)	2
Hungary (Dance Top 40)	8
Hungary (Single Top 40)	2
Hungary (Stream Top 40)	6
Iceland (Tónlistinn)	12
Ireland (IRMA)	6
Italy (FIMI)	76
Lithuania (AGATA)	6
Luxembourg (Billboard)	10
Netherlands (Dutch Top 40)	1
Netherlands (Single Top 100)	5
New Zealand Hot Singles (RMNZ)	18
Norway (VG-lista)	11
Poland Airplay (ZPAV)	1
Portugal (AFP)	42
Romania Airplay (UPFR)	7
Russia Airplay (TopHit)	6
Slovakia Airplay (ČNS IFPI)	13
South Africa Streaming (TOSAC)	23
Suriname (Nationale Top 40)	22
Sweden (Sverigetopplistan)	21
Switzerland (Schweizer Hitparade)	5
UK Singles (Official Charts)	12
UK Dance (Official Charts)	4
Ukraine Airplay (TopHit)	2
US Billboard Hot 100	42
US Hot Dance/Electronic Songs (Billboard)	2
US Pop Airplay (Billboard)	16

2026 weekly chart performance
Chart (2026)	Peak position
Hungary (Rádiós Top 40)	34

=== Monthly charts ===
Monthly chart performance
Chart (2021–2025)	Peak position
Belarus Airplay (TopHit)	94
CIS (TopHit)	6
Russia Airplay (TopHit)	9
Ukraine Airplay (TopHit)	3

=== Year-end charts ===
2021 year-end chart performance
Chart (2021)	Position
Netherlands (Dutch Top 40)	100

2022 year-end chart performance
Chart (2022)	Position
Australia (ARIA)	53
Australia Dance (ARIA)	7
Austria (Ö3 Austria Top 40)	14
Belgium (Ultratop 50 Flanders)	9
Belgium (Ultratop 50 Wallonia)	17
Canada (Canadian Hot 100)	16
CIS (TopHit)	9
Croatia (HRT)	22
Denmark (Tracklisten)	42
El Salvador (Monitor Latino)	93
France (SNEP)	142
Germany (Official German Charts)	17
Global 200 (Billboard)	37
Hungary (Dance Top 100)	26
Hungary (Rádiós Top 100)	23
Hungary (Single Top 100)	21
Hungary (Stream Top 100)	12
Iceland (Tónlistinn)	49
Lithuania (AGATA)	13
Netherlands (Dutch Top 40)	4
Netherlands (Single Top 100)	16
Poland (ZPAV)	51
Russia Airplay (TopHit)	16
Sweden (Sverigetopplistan)	78
Switzerland (Schweizer Hitparade)	12
UK Singles (OCC)	57
Ukraine Airplay (TopHit)	18
US Hot Dance/Electronic Songs (Billboard)	4

2023 year-end chart performance
Chart (2023)	Position
CIS (TopHit)	118
Ukraine Airplay (TopHit)	55

2024 year-end chart performance
Chart (2024)	Position
Lithuania Airplay (TopHit)	105

2025 year-end chart performance
Chart (2025)	Position
Lithuania Airplay (TopHit)	196

== Certifications ==
Certifications and sales
Region	Certification	Certified units/sales
Australia (ARIA)	2× Platinum	140,000^{‡}
Austria (IFPI Austria)	2× Platinum	60,000^{‡}
Brazil (Pro-Música Brasil)	Platinum	40,000^{‡}
Canada (Music Canada)	7× Platinum	560,000^{‡}
Denmark (IFPI Danmark)	Platinum	90,000^{‡}
France (SNEP)	Diamond	333,333^{‡}
Germany (BVMI)	Platinum	400,000^{‡}
Italy (FIMI)	Platinum	100,000^{‡}
New Zealand (RMNZ)	2× Platinum	60,000^{‡}
Norway (IFPI Norway)	Platinum	60,000^{‡}
Poland (ZPAV)	4× Platinum	200,000^{‡}
Portugal (AFP)	Platinum	10,000^{‡}
Spain (Promusicae)	Platinum	60,000^{‡}
United Kingdom (BPI)	Platinum	600,000^{‡}
United States (RIAA)	Platinum	1,000,000^{‡}
^{‡} Sales+streaming figures based on certification alone.

== Release history ==
Release dates and formats
Region	Date	Format(s)	Label(s)	Ref.
Various	4 November 2021	Digital download; streaming	Atlantic; Musical Freedom	
Italy	12 November 2021	Radio airplay	Warner	
United States	15 February 2022	Contemporary hit radio	Warner	

== See also ==
- List of Dutch Top 40 number-one singles of 2022
- List of Billboard number-one dance songs of 2022
- List of number-one singles of 2022 (Poland)
- List of number-one songs of the 2020s (Czech Republic)
