= Angelina Jordan =

Norwegian-American singer (born 2006)

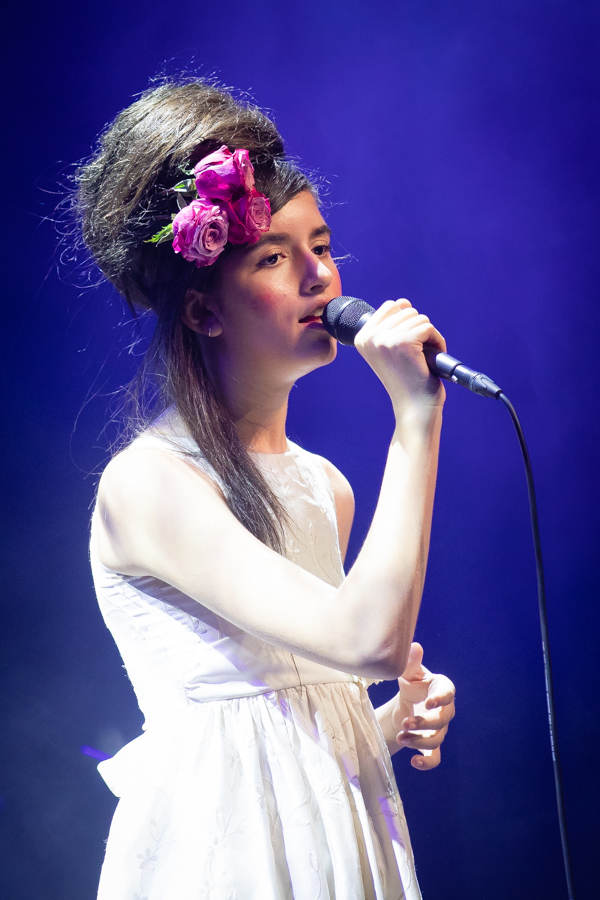
- Jordan in 2018

Background information
- Born: Angelina Jordan Astar; 10 January 2006 (age 20); Oslo, Norway
- Occupation: Singer
- Instruments: Vocals; piano; guitar
- Years active: 2014–present
- Label: Republic Records
- Website: angelinajordanofficial.com

Angelina Jordan Astar (born 10 January 2006) is a Norwegian singer whose audition for the 2014 season of Norway's Got Talent at the age of seven, singing "Gloomy Sunday" in the style of Billie Holiday, became a viral video online and brought her worldwide press coverage. She went on to win the competition at the age of eight with her performance of George Gershwin's "Summertime". Since then, she has worked to raise money on behalf of environmental causes and various children's charities. She always performs barefoot, after befriending a young shoeless girl and giving her shoes. Jordan later wrote a book about the experience, Mellom to hjerter (Between Two Hearts).

Jordan has released multiple digital singles, EPs, and full-length albums. She appeared on the first season of Little Big Shots in 2016, and the second season of America's Got Talent: The Champions in 2020, where her cover version of Queen's "Bohemian Rhapsody" brought her much attention.

Jordan has lived in the United States since 2018. In August 2020, it was announced that she has signed with Republic Records. Her first single under that label, "Million Miles", was released in November 2020.

== Career ==
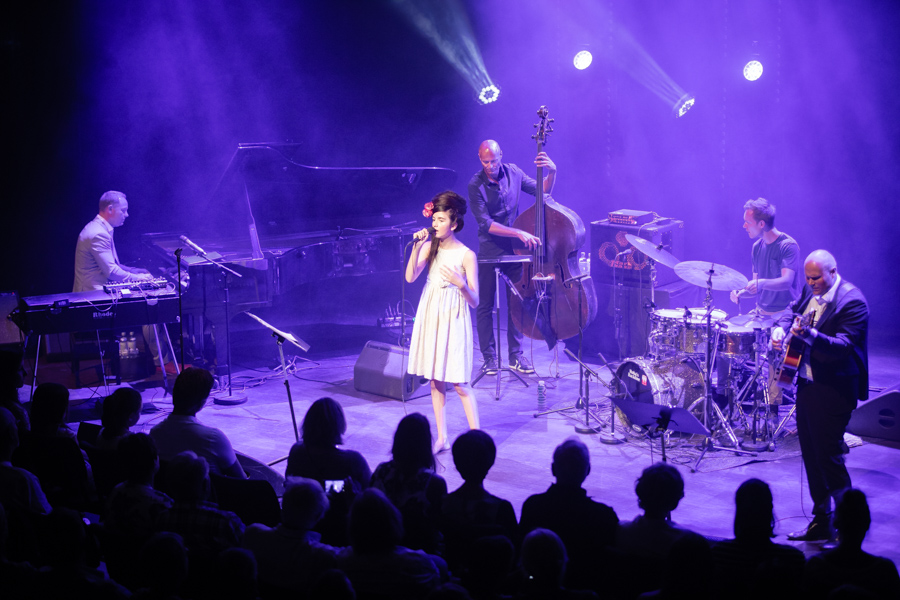
Jordan at Kongsberg Jazzfestival in 2018.

=== 2014: From Norway's Got Talent to My Christmas ===
After Jordan's performances of two Billie Holiday songs, "Gloomy Sunday" and "I'm a Fool to Want You", on Norway's Got Talent, as well as "Fly Me to the Moon" on a TV talk show, all went viral online in March 2014, she was featured in Time, Daily Mirror, People, and other news outlets around the world. She continued in the competition singing Nancy Sinatra's version of "Bang Bang (My Baby Shot Me Down)" live in the semi-finals, and won with her performance of George Gershwin's "Summertime", in the style of Ella Fitzgerald and Louis Armstrong's 1958 recording of the song.

In September 2014, she performed "Fly Me to the Moon" on the US television show The View, bringing her wider fame in the United States. She also performed on several TV 2 programs in Norway over the next few years, including multiple appearances on Allsang på Grensen (Singalong at the Border, referring to the border fortress of Fredriksten where outdoor concerts are held) and on TV4 in Sweden.

Jordan had a small guest role in the final episode of the Netflix series Lilyhammer, playing a girl who sings in a bar.

In December 2014, she partly realized a personal ambition of singing at the Nobel Peace Prize Concert by performing for Peace Prize recipients Malala Yousafzai and Kailash Satyarthi at the Save the Children's Peace Prize Celebration.

Jordan's recording debut, the three-song maxi-single My Christmas, was released in December 2014. To support the release, Jordan performed the songs on multiple TV shows, including an appearance on Christmas Day.

=== 2015–2019: YouTube channels, The EP, It's Magic ===
In 2015, Jordan began recording music that would eventually be collected on the six-song Angelina Jordan – The EP, released on 27 November 2017. Many of the tracks were posted to her official YouTube channel well in advance of the EP release, in the form of music videos and lyric videos. These included her covers of Screamin' Jay Hawkins' "I Put a Spell on You", the music video for which was directed by Per Heimly, and Amy Winehouse's "Back to Black", in which Jordan sang her own original lyrics. These two music videos became the most popular videos on her official YouTube channel, surpassing 5 million views each by 2020. In 2017, she created a second YouTube channel specifically to present performances of cover songs.

In November 2015, Jordan published the book Mellom to hjerter (Between Two Hearts), which was illustrated by her grandmother, Iranian artist Mery Zamani. The book tells the story of her meeting a poor motherless girl in the Middle East who has no shoes. After a long conversation in which they discuss their dreams in life, she gives the girl her shoes and the girl promises to pray for Jordan to fulfill her dream to become a successful singer. According to Jordan the book is based on a real incident that happened when she was six, which she cites as the reason for always performing barefoot.

In April 2016, Jordan performed "Fly Me to the Moon" on the first season of the noncompetitive children's talent show Little Big Shots. A year later she performed "What a Difference a Day Makes" on the UK version of the show. She also performed "I Put a Spell on You" on the German edition of the show, Little Big Stars, in 2017.

In December 2016, she performed on Alan Walker is Heading Home, a live concert broadcast from Bergen, Norway, where she sang Walker's songs "Sing Me to Sleep" and "Faded".

On 15 June 2018, a full album of recordings with Staff Band of the Norwegian Armed Forces (Forsvarets stabsmusikkorps), called It's Magic, was released. The next day, Jordan and the band performed the full album live in a concert attended by Norway's Prime Minister.

On 27 June 2018, Jordan performed "Fly Me to the Moon" for Quincy Jones in The O2 Arena in London, as part of his 85th birthday celebration, and also joined with other singers to perform "Man in the Mirror" to close the show.

=== 2019–2023: America's Got Talent, "Bohemian Rhapsody", Republic Records ===
In 2019, Jordan performed for former president Barack Obama and other public figures at the Brilliant Minds conference in Stockholm.

In October 2019, she competed in the second season of America's Got Talent: The Champions, which was aired in January and February 2020. Her first appearance on the show, singing an original arrangement of Queen's "Bohemian Rhapsody", received a "golden buzzer" from judge Heidi Klum (meaning that Jordan would pass directly into the finals). A video of Jordan's performance began to go viral on YouTube. The performance also garnered praise from Queen's official Twitter account. Jordan released two weeks later a studio version of the same arrangement under her own copyright. Jordan's second performance (in the finals), a similarly reworked "Goodbye Yellow Brick Road" based largely on a version by Sara Bareilles, was also well received, but she was not among the top 5 acts.

In August 2020, Jordan's manager (her uncle), announced that she had signed with Republic Records. Her first single on the label, "Million Miles", was released on 6 November 2020, on all major digital platforms. An official lyric video was posted to her official YouTube channel the same day. The track was produced by the Norwegian duo Stargate, who also co-wrote the song with Jordan. She has since released two additional music videos for the song: one showing her singing the song "live" in a recording studio, the other an "official music video" featuring her younger sister.

In June 2022, after a two-year hiatus brought on by the worldwide COVID-19 pandemic, Jordan resumed singing in front of live audiences with an appearance in the first episode of the final season of Allsang på Grensen.

In February 2023, Jordan together with a Moroccan-Swedish record producer Red One, performed 2022 FIFA anthem titled "We Are the Best" in front of a worldwide audience at the Best FIFA Football Awards 2022. In July, her first EP of all originals songs, Old Enough, was released, and in December her Christmas EP Driving Home for Christmas with five cover songs.

=== 2024-2025: Collaboration with Toby Gad, going independent ===
In May 2024, Jordan announced a collaboration with Toby Gad. They published several cover songs and their co-written original song "Bad Valentine" on Gad's own Kite Records label.

In Sept 2024, Angelina performed her first concert in Los Angeles at the Alex Theater, where she performed "Bad Valentine" and previewed two more original songs, "Thank You" and "What Am I to You". In addition, Angelina performed a duet of "All of Me" with Scott Hoying of Pentatonix, accompanied by Toby Gad on piano.

Angelina finished up 2024 with a Christmas Concert at the El Rey Theater in Los Angeles.

In 2025, Jordan again became an independent artist. She published two albums with original songs, with lyrics based on her grandmother's poems.

== Personal life ==
Jordan was born in Oslo, Norway, and has lived for extended periods both there and in Los Angeles. She also lived for a time in the Middle East. She has a younger sister who has been featured in some of her music videos. Her father, Gerry Christian Slättman, is Swedish. Her Norwegian mother, Sara Astar, is the daughter of Iranian artist and poet Mery Zamani and a Japanese father.

Jordan attended the Oslo Waldorf School and participated in the Oslo School of Music and Performing Arts after-school program, where she received vocal training and piano lessons. In addition to singing and playing the piano, she plays violin, guitar and flute, and also paints.

Since 2018, she has been living and going to school in Los Angeles.

In November 2023, she was presented as a debutante at Le Bal des débutantes in Paris.

== Discography ==
=== Albums ===
Title	Release date	Track listing
My Christmas (maxi-single)	14 December 2014	1. "White Christmas"; 2. "I Saw Mommy Kissing Santa Claus"; 3. "Silent Night"
Angelina Jordan – The EP	27 November 2017	1. "I Put a Spell on You"; 2. "Our Day Will Come"; 3. "When You're Smiling"; 4. "Fly Me to the Moon"; 5. "What a Difference a Day Makes"; 6. "Back to Black"
It's Magic (with Forsvarets stabsmusikkorps)	15 June 2018	1. "It's Magic" (Cahn, Styne); 2. "What is Life" (Jordan); 3. "Cheek to Cheek" (Berlin); 4. "Waltz for Debbie" (Evans) [instrumental]; 5. "Oslo" (Jordan); 6. "Crazy" (Nelson); 7. "Fly Me to the Moon" (Howard); 8. "Cry Me a River" (Hamilton); 9. "Line for Lyons" (Mulligan) [instrumental]; 10. "I'm a Fool to Want You" (Herron, Sinatra, Wolf); 11. "La Bohème" (Aznavour, Plante); 12. "It's a Man's World" (Brown, Newsone); 13. "Answer Me, My Love" (Rauch, Winkler) [instrumental]; 14. "Mr. Lonely" (Vinton, Allan); 15. "Speak Softly Love" (Rota); 16. "Can't Help Falling in Love" (Weiss, Greatore, Peretti)
Old Enough	21 July 2023	1. "Love Don't Let Me Go"; 2. "Now I'm the Fool"; 3. "Fire and Rain"; 4. "All My Fault"; 5. "Good In Goodbyes"; 6. "Diamond"
Driving Home For Christmas	8 December 2023	1. "Driving Home For Christmas"; 2. "Let It Snow"; 3. "Jingle Bell Rock"; 4. "Have Yourself A Merry Little Christmas"; 5. "The Christmas Song"
Secret Of The Soul	9 September 2025	1. "So Peaceful Beside You"; 2. "Falling for You"; 3. "Play No Game"; 4. "Since You Walked Away"; 5. "The Light Is Fading"; 6. "Home"; 7. "Kiss Me One Last Time"; 8. "When I Come Back"; 9. "No One Can Hear My Heart"; 10. "Summer Wind"; 11. "Beyond the Dream"; 12. "Tears Became My Endless Sea"
Secret Of The Star	18 November 2025	1. "Every wish begins with you" 2. "Eternal Love"; 3. "Glory Shines For Everyone"; 4. "A Christmas Prayer"; 5. "All I want is you" 6. "Christmas, I’m not alone" 7. "Who’ll wipe their tears away"
Secret Of Love	6 March 2026	1. "Still Standing"; 2. "Memories"; 3. "You Know When It's Gone"; 4. "Bel Air"; 5. "Mi Amor"; 6. "Without Your Love"; 7. "The Way I Do"; 8. "My Love"; 9. "Only You"; 10. "The Day I Chose You"; 11. "Starlight"; 12. "As Long As I Have You"

=== Singles ===
List of singles as lead artist, with selected chart positions, showing album name and year released
Title	Year	Peak chart positions			Album
Title	Year	ROU Air.	ROU TV Air.	TUR Int. Air.	Album
"I Put a Spell on You"	2016	—	—	*	Angelina Jordan
"What a Difference a Day Makes"	2016	—	—	*	Angelina Jordan
"Fly Me to the Moon" (Acoustic)	2017	—	—	*	Angelina Jordan
"Back to Black" (with lyrics by Jordan)	2017	—	—	*	Angelina Jordan
"What is Life" (with Forsvarets Stabsmusikkorps)	2018	—	—	*	It's Magic
"Shield"	2018	—	—	*	Non-album singles
"Bohemian Rhapsody"	2020	—	—	—	Non-album singles
"Million Miles"	2020	—	—	—	Non-album singles
"7th Heaven"	2021	—	—	—	Non-album singles
"Mercy"	2021	—	—	—	The Hating Game
"Love Don't Let Me Go"	2023	1	5	1	Non-album singles
"Our Time"	2023	—	—	—	Non-album singles
"What a Wonderful World"	2024	—	—	—	Non-album singles

Featured in

Title	Year	Album
"Song for A"; Nico Cartosio featuring Angelina Jordan	2019	Melting
"Above the Water"; TRXD featuring Angelina Jordan	2020	
"We are the Best"; Red One featuring Angelina Jordan	2023	
"If I were A Boy"; Toby Gad featuring Angelina Jordan	2024	
"If I were A Boy (Piano Diaries)"; Toby Gad featuring Angelina Jordan	2024	Piano Diaries - The Hits
"Bad Valentine"; Toby Gad featuring Angelina Jordan	2024	
"Bad Valentine (Piano Diaries)"; Toby Gad featuring Angelina Jordan	2024	
