= Inge Valen =

Norwegian footballer (born 1951)

Inge Magnar Valen (born 9 January 1951) is a former Norwegian footballer from Stavanger. Valen was taken up in the Viking squad at the start of the so-called golden 70s when the Viking won the league title, and cup-gold in 1979. He played for Viking from 1972 to 1980, then played a few games in 1982 and 1985. He also played two matches for the Norway national football team. Valen was named midfielder of the year in 1974 by the Norwegian newspaper Verdens Gang. He played actively for Viking until 1979. Today he works for the youth-team of Viking FK. He has also held several positions in the club, including chairman. In 1974, on the day Viking won the league gold, his son, the comedian and imitator Kristian Valen, was born.
