= Hot in It =

Single by Tiësto and Charli XCX

from the album Drive
- Released: 30 June 2022
- Genre: Dance-pop
- Length: 2:09
- Label: Musical Freedom; Atlantic
- Songwriters: Tijs Verwest; Charlotte Aitchison; Kiddo; Frank Nobel; Hight; Linus Nordstrom
- Producers: Tiësto; Goldfingers

Tiësto singles chronology
"The Motto" (2021)	"Hot in It" (2022)	"Can U Dance (To My Beat)" (2022)

Charli XCX singles chronology
"Used to Know Me" (2022)	"Hot in It" (2022)	"Hot Girl" (2022)

Music video
- "Hot in It" (lyric video) on YouTube

Music video
- "Hot in It" (official video) on YouTube

"Hot in It" is a song by Dutch DJ and record producer Tiësto and British singer Charli XCX, released on 30 June 2022 through Musical Freedom and Atlantic Records as the fourth single from Tiësto's seventh studio album, Drive (2023). It marks the pair's first direct collaboration, with Tiësto having previously remixed Charli XCX's 2012 collaboration with Icona Pop, "I Love It", and her 2014 single "Break the Rules".

Commercially, the song reached number one in Latvia and the top 40 in The United Kingdom, CIS, Hungary, Ireland, and The Netherlands.

== Background ==
Charli XCX first teased the song on her social media accounts in May 2022, sharing a snippet of the chorus in a video posted to her TikTok. Tiësto stated that he knew the song would be a "smash" when he first heard Charli XCX's vocals on the recording, and also said that it was "amazing to see how everyone has been reacting to the message of the song".

== Reception ==
Tom Breihan of Stereogum called the song a "short dance-pop track with a brittle Tiësto beat and lyrics about overcoming a breakup by hitting the dancefloor and looking good", writing that Charli XCX sings about "rockin' it, droppin' it, shaking her ass, no stoppin' it" in the chorus. The song was nominated for Dance Song of the Year at the 2023 iHeartRadio Music Awards.

=== Rankings ===
Critical rankings
Publication	Accolade	Rank	Ref.
The Guardian	The 20 best songs of 2022	15	

== Commercial performance ==
On the midweek UK Singles Chart dated 18 July 2022, the song was number 24. On 12 July 2022, the song debuted at number 85 on the Canadian Hot 100.

== Credits and personnel ==
- Tiësto – producer
- Charli XCX – vocals
- Goldfingers – producer
- Tim Deal – keyboards, programming
- Bart Schoudel – vocal production
- Tom Norris – mixing

== Charts ==
=== Weekly charts ===
Weekly chart performance
Chart (2022–2025)	Peak position
Canada Hot 100 (Billboard)	85
CIS (TopHit)	18
Czech Republic Airplay (ČNS IFPI)	53
Germany (GfK)	76
Germany Airplay (BVMI)	33
Global 200 (Billboard)	136
Greece International (IFPI)	39
Hungary (Dance Top 40)	25
Hungary (Rádiós Top 40)	32
Hungary (Single Top 40)	24
Ireland (IRMA)	27
Latvia (EHR)	1
Lithuania (AGATA)	62
Netherlands (Dutch Top 40)	12
Netherlands (Single Top 100)	19
New Zealand Hot Singles (RMNZ)	8
Poland Airplay (ZPAV)	42
Russia Airplay (TopHit) Extended	28
Slovakia Airplay (ČNS IFPI)	77
Slovakia Singles Digital (ČNS IFPI)	61
Sweden (Sverigetopplistan)	56
UK Singles (Official Charts)	24
UK Dance (Official Charts)	11
US Hot Dance/Electronic Songs (Billboard)	10

=== Monthly charts ===
Monthly chart performance
Chart (2022)	Peak position
Russia Airplay (TopHit)	22

=== Year-end charts ===
2022 year-end chart performance
Chart (2022)	Position
Netherlands (Dutch Top 40)	65
Netherlands (Single Top 100)	88
Russia Airplay (TopHit)	144
US Hot Dance/Electronic Songs (Billboard)	42

2025 year-end chart performance
Chart (2025)	Position
Hungary (Dance Top 40)	95

== Certifications ==
Certifications
Region	Certification	Certified units/sales
Canada (Music Canada)	Gold	40,000^{‡}
New Zealand (RMNZ)	Gold	15,000^{‡}
Poland (ZPAV)	Gold	25,000^{‡}
United Kingdom (BPI)	Gold	400,000^{‡}
^{‡} Sales+streaming figures based on certification alone.
