= Kristian Valen =

Norwegian comedian and musician

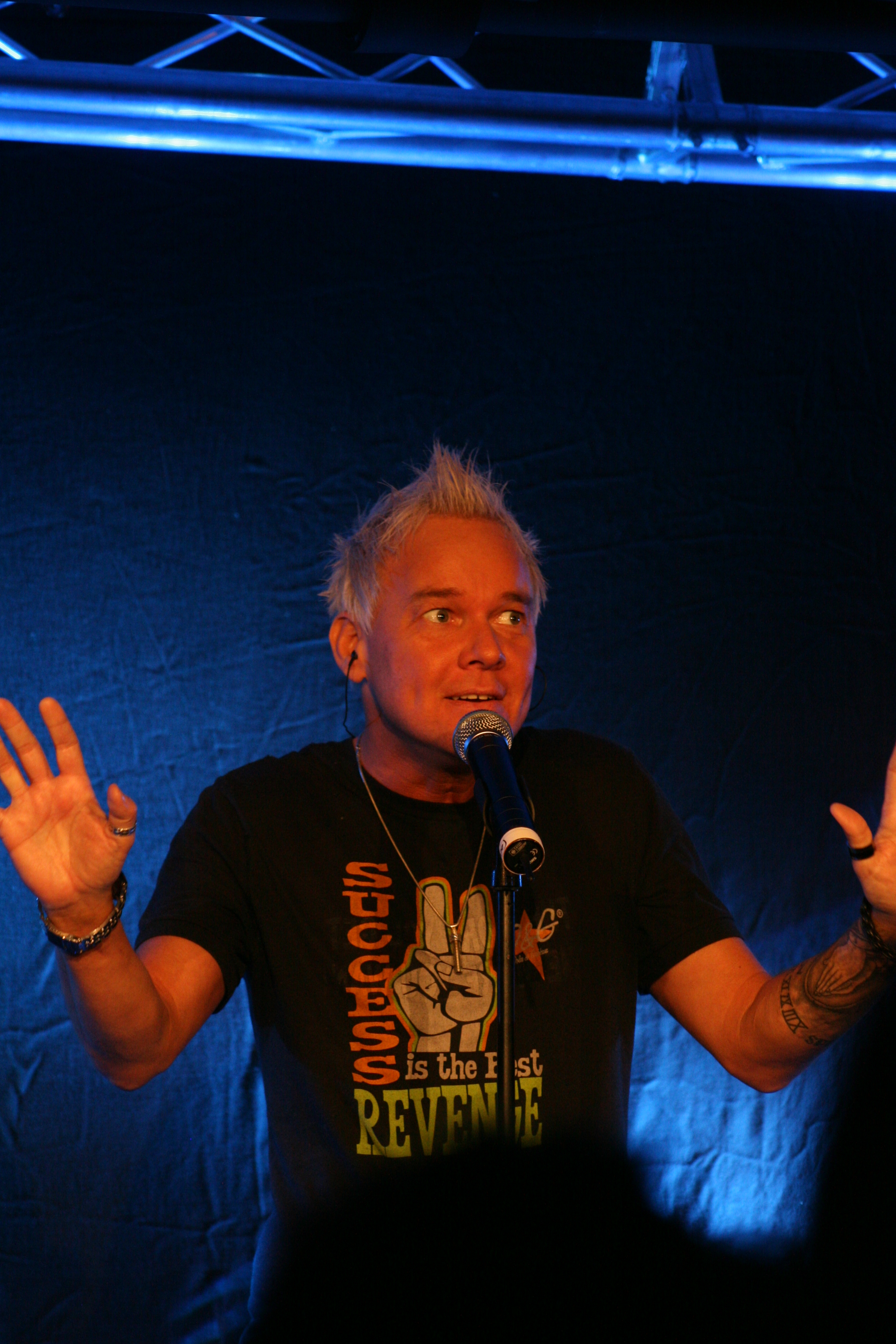
- Born: 13 October 1974 (age 51); Stavanger, Norway
- Occupations: Comedian; actor; singer; songwriter
- Father: Inge Valen

Kristian Valen (born 13 October 1974) is a comedian, actor, singer and songwriter originally from Stavanger, Norway. Known for comedic impressions, Valen has also pursued a music career; his pop music album Listen When Alone was released internationally in Europe and Asia. Valen was asked by Katherine Jackson to perform his song "Still Here" at the Jackson Family Foundation's Forever Michael: A Celebration of an Icon, the one year Michael Jackson memorial show held in 2010 at Beverly Hilton Hotel the home of the Golden Globes in Los Angeles.

He took part in Melodi Grand Prix 2017 with the song "You & I".

== Biography ==
=== Early life ===
Son of Inge Valen, who played as a footballer for the team Viking FK, Valen was expected to follow in his father's footsteps to become a sportsman. However, Valen left the sport of football when he was 16 and wound up hosting a popular radio show in his native city of Stavanger, Norway. His quick wit and popular on-air impersonations led Valen to the world of comedy.

=== Comedy ===
Valen has created several successful live shows, including Fartøy Valen (Ship Valen), Et Musikalsk Kaos (A Musical Chaos), and Raskere enn sitt eget beste (Faster than His Own Good). The shows have to date netted Valen an estimated US$40 million in ticket sales. His three TV series Valen TV, Valen & De and Valen`s Frokost TV aired on the national Norwegian broadcaster TV Norge, and topped the ratings. He has been voted "Entertainer of the Year" by viewers of Norway's TV2 and the "Årets TV-ansikt" ("This Year's TV-face") by the readers of the magazine Se & Hør (See & Hear). In October of that year he became the most selling artist in Scandinavia.

All three of Valen's TV series also became DVD releases. Valen stated he would have been happy if his first DVD Valen TV sold 5,000 copies; the DVD went on to sell well over 120,000 copies and to win the award for Best DVD overall in 2003. DVD releases of Fartøy Valen, Valen & De ,Frokost TV and the Saturday night comedy show "Valens Rikskringkasting" and Valen's most recent DVD production (of the hit show) Raskere enn sitt eget beste sold 25,000 copies in one day. To date, Valen's DVD sales have reportedly topped 500,000 (he has released six DVDs). In 2013 he wrote, directed and produced his own stage show ("From Hillevåg to Hollywood") containing impersonations of both international and Scandinavian singers/artist and celebrities. The show was a hit since day one and was sold out two years ahead of time and 2015 sold out as well. This makes him the most selling artist in Scandinavia of all time with over 700,000 tickets sold.

In the Autumn of 2014 he made a slight change by making his TV show "The Valen Channel" more of an entertainment show rather than just slapstick comedy with only impersonations and characters. (The show featured guests including Sharon Stone, William Shatner, Steven Bauer, Esai Morales as well as duets with noted American artists such as singer/producer Jean Beavour, and Lita Ford - who sang "Close My Eyes Forever" written with Ozzy Osbourne.)

The Lita/"Ozzy" live duet courted both controversy and praise all over the world, with Ozzy fans expressing anger with Lita Ford for doing this, and for Valen's parody.

=== Music ===
Valen founded his own company Deepwater Records and recorded his debut solo album Listen When Alone in 2004. Produced by Arvid Solvang, the album went gold in five days, and went on to go platinum. The first single from the album, "Still Here" reached No. 1 on the country's biggest station NRK's P1 and the video for the single – which featured a spectacular car crash on the streets of Los Angeles – was voted No. 1 by viewers of Norwegian national broadcaster NRK's popular Swish program, and No. 3 by readers of national newspaper Dagbladet. The song was used as the theme music for the German TV series Leben für die Liebe. Another single from the album "If I Was" featured controversial fictional depictions of a Norwegian soldier being killed while fighting in a foreign army in the Bosnian War, depictions which were criticised by the Norwegian Armed Forces. Valen's most recent single “Blessed by a Woman” was released on 15 March 2011, also by Deepwater Records. Valen has signed a worldwide music publishing contract with Air Chrysalis Scandinavia.

=== Recent and current events ===
Valen was asked by Katherine Jackson (Michael's mother) to appear at Forever Michael: A Celebration of an Icon. The show was held to commemorate the one year anniversary of Michael Jackson's death. Held at the Beverly Hilton Hotel in Beverly Hills (home of the Golden Globe Awards), the show also featured performances by Jackson family members Genevieve Jackson and Tito Jackson, as well as Motown legends The Chi Lites. Valen performed his song “Still Here” and also did a montage of his musical impressions for the event.

Valen recently had a cognac brand named after him by the French company Cognac Gautier. Selection Valen Cognac V.S.O.P. is currently sold in Norway, but will also be sold throughout Scandinavia and in selected US markets.

Valen released his 6th TV show "The Valen Channel" which was the first program he wrote, produced and starred along with artists like Sharon Stone, William Shatner, Steven Bauer, Esai Morales, Jean Beavour and Lita Ford. The show was the first entertainment show rather than only comedy like his five earlier TV shows. He wanted to make a TV show that had more of the same vibe as his live shows where the whole experience was more important than to be having the funniest show. The show aired in autumn 2014 and to critical approval and it became a rating hit. (About 700,000+ saw the show every week, in a country with 5 million inhabitants going up against the 9´oclock News.).

== Legal issues ==
In 2007 police were responded to Valen's Oslo apartment, after he had shot at the shower cabinet in his bathroom with a Heckler & Koch MP5 submachine gun. Valen opened fire to ward off an apparent intruder he had spotted. When police arrived they confiscated 25 ex-military firearms from Valen's home, which led to him being fined 10,000 kr for gun law violations.

In September 2016, Valen was sentenced to 25 days in prison for two incidents which took place earlier that year. The first case for which he was convicted, occurred in February 2016, when medical personnel and police were called out to a medical emergency at his apartment. In the aftermath of the incident, Valen had published pictures of the attending police officers on Facebook, along with messages which were found by Oslo District Court to have been of a threatening nature. The other incident which formed part of his conviction, took place in mid-September 2016, when Valen was arrested by police at Aker Brygge in Oslo while dressed in camouflage garb and in possession of a replica firearm. Following his arrests, Valen spent a total of six days in police custody before being released to await trial. He appealed the convictions. In February 2017 it was announced that Valen would have his appeal heard at Borgarting Court of Appeal.

In October 2016, Valen stated his intention to emigrate from Norway, citing as reasons what he alleges to be harassment by the Norwegian Police and claiming he has been physically assaulted on the street.

Awards
Preceded by Robert Stoltenberg	Se og Hør's TV Personality of the Year; 2003	Succeeded by Katrine Moholt
