= Terje Joelsen =

Norwegian footballer (born 1968)

Personal information
- Date of birth: 3 June 1968 (age 58)
- Position: Striker

Senior career*
Years	Team	Apps	(Gls)
1987–1989	Ull/Kisa		
1990–1995	Vålerengen		
1996	Holter		
- * Club domestic league appearances and goals

Terje Joelsen (born 3 June 1968) is a retired Norwegian football striker.

He played youth football for Ullensaker/Kisa IL, and also featured for the senior team. Ahead of the 1990 season he joined Vålerengens IF. After some years in the Norwegian Premier League, ahead of the 1996 season he joined Holter IF in the Second Division.
