= John Anders Skoglund =

Norwegian footballer (born 1971)

Personal information
- Date of birth: 1 October 1971 (age 55)
- Position: Striker

Youth career
- Rælingen

Senior career*
Years	Team	Apps	(Gls)
–1996	Holter		
1997–1998	Vålerenga		
1998	→ Skjetten (loan)		
1999–2002	Ull/Kisa		
- Gjerdrum
- * Club domestic league appearances and goals

John Anders Skoglund (born 1 October 1971) is a retired Norwegian football striker.

He played youth football for Rælingen FK. He later joined Holter IF, and scored 20 goals in the 1996 Norwegian Second Division season. As a result, he was signed by Norwegian Premier League team Vålerenga IF. However, he did not become an immediate success, and was loaned out to Skjetten SK in the middle of the 1998 season. Ahead of the 1999 season he joined Ullensaker/Kisa IL. He left this club after the 2002 season, and was later on the books of Gjerdrum IL in the lower divisions.
