= 10:35 =

Single by Tiësto featuring Tate McRae

from the album Drive
- Released: 3 November 2022
- Recorded: 2021
- Genre: Dance-pop; EDM
- Length: 2:52
- Label: Musical Freedom; Atlantic
- Songwriters: Tijs Verwest; Scott Harris; Amy Allen; Peter Rycroft; Tate McRae; Ryan Tedder
- Producers: Lostboy; Ryan Tedder; Tiësto

Tiësto singles chronology
"Pump It Louder" (2022)	"10:35" (2022)	"I Can't Wait" (2022)

Tate McRae singles chronology
"Uh Oh" (2022)	"10:35" (2022)	"Greedy" (2023)

Music video
- "10:35" on YouTube

"10:35" is a song by Dutch DJ Tiësto featuring Canadian singer Tate McRae. It was released on 3 November 2022 through Musical Freedom and Atlantic Records as the sixth single from Tiësto's seventh studio album Drive. The song is also featured in the soundtrack of F1 23.

== Background ==
On 21 October 2022, McRae first teased the song in a TikTok recorded at Atlantis The Royal, Dubai without disclosing any further details on the song. It turned out that the music video for the song was filmed at the resort, which opened in January 2023.

Tate and I wanted to create a song that captured the energy of an experience at Atlantis The Royal, and I'm proud to say the feeling of 10:35 and this property are both infectious! So excited for the world to finally hear it.

— Tiësto on the song celebrating the partnership with the resort, Billboard

The DJ also pointed out similarities between the core message of the song, a switch "from day to night", and the "dual experience" of the hotel.

== Reception ==
The song was described as a perfect mixture between McRae's "easy vocals" and Tiësto's "rough, bassy drop". Lexi Lane of Uproxx called it a "dance anthem" and highlighted McRae's "crystal-clear vocals", as well as an instrumental that "builds anticipation".

== Charts ==
=== Weekly charts ===
Weekly chart performance for "10:35"
Chart (2022–2024)	Peak position
Australia (ARIA)	13
Austria (Ö3 Austria Top 40)	10
Belarus Airplay (TopHit)	129
Belgium (Ultratop 50 Flanders)	23
Belgium (Ultratop 50 Wallonia)	11
Canada Hot 100 (Billboard)	18
CIS Airplay (TopHit)	33
Czech Republic Airplay (ČNS IFPI)	8
Czech Republic Singles Digital (ČNS IFPI)	44
Denmark (Tracklisten)	16
Estonia Airplay (TopHit)	1
France (SNEP)	57
Germany (GfK)	11
Global 200 (Billboard)	38
Greece (IFPI)	53
Hungary (Dance Top 40)	15
Hungary (Rádiós Top 40)	1
Hungary (Single Top 40)	8
Hungary (Stream Top 40)	28
Ireland (IRMA)	5
Kazakhstan Airplay (TopHit)	160
Latvia Airplay (LAIPA)	2
Lebanon (Lebanese Top 20)	5
Lithuania (AGATA)	15
Lithuania Airplay (TopHit)	15
Luxembourg (Billboard)	19
Netherlands (Dutch Top 40)	12
Netherlands (Single Top 100)	16
New Zealand (Recorded Music NZ)	29
Nigeria (TurnTable Top 100)	55
Norway (VG-lista)	19
Poland (Polish Airplay Top 100)	20
Poland (Polish Streaming Top 100)	48
Portugal (AFP)	113
Romania Airplay (Media Forest)	10
Russia Airplay (TopHit)	65
Slovakia Airplay (ČNS IFPI)	47
Slovakia Singles Digital (ČNS IFPI)	21
Sweden (Sverigetopplistan)	40
Switzerland (Schweizer Hitparade)	13
UK Singles (Official Charts)	8
US Billboard Hot 100	69
US Hot Dance/Electronic Songs (Billboard)	3
US Pop Airplay (Billboard)	21
US Rhythmic Airplay (Billboard)	39

=== Monthly charts ===
Monthly chart performance for "10:35"
Chart (2023)	Peak position
CIS Airplay (TopHit)	34
Czech Republic (Rádio – Top 100)	34
Czech Republic (Singles Digitál – Top 100)	48
Estonia Airplay (TopHit)	14
Latvia Airplay (TopHit)	16
Lithuania Airplay (TopHit)	27
Romania Airplay (TopHit)	23
Slovakia (Rádio – Top 100)	50
Slovakia (Singles Digitál – Top 100)	37

=== Year-end charts ===
2022 year-end chart performance for "10:35"
Chart (2022)	Position
Netherlands (Dutch Top 40)	93

2023 year-end chart performance for "10:35"
Chart (2023)	Position
Australia (ARIA)	25
Austria (Ö3 Austria Top 40)	33
Belgium (Ultratop Flanders)	64
Belgium (Ultratop Wallonia)	39
Canada (Canadian Hot 100)	41
CIS Airplay (TopHit)	91
Denmark (Tracklisten)	77
Estonia Airplay (TopHit)	28
Germany (Official German Charts)	39
Global 200 (Billboard)	140
Hungary (Dance Top 40)	53
Hungary (Rádiós Top 40)	6
Latvia Airplay (TopHit)	20
Lithuania Airplay (TopHit)	36
Netherlands (Dutch Top 40)	61
Netherlands (Single Top 100)	61
Romania Airplay (TopHit)	113
Switzerland (Schweizer Hitparade)	45
UK Singles (OCC)	37
US Hot Dance/Electronic Songs (Billboard)	5

2024 year-end chart performance for "10:35"
Chart (2024)	Position
Australia Dance (ARIA)	16
Hungary (Dance Top 40)	74
Hungary (Rádiós Top 40)	81
Lithuania Airplay (TopHit)	115

2025 year-end chart performance for "10:35"
Chart (2025)	Position
Lithuania Airplay (TopHit)	188

== Certifications ==
Certifications for "10:35"
Region	Certification	Certified units/sales
Australia (ARIA)	Platinum	70,000^{‡}
Austria (IFPI Austria)	Platinum	30,000^{‡}
Canada (Music Canada)	5× Platinum	400,000^{‡}
Denmark (IFPI Danmark)	Platinum	90,000^{‡}
France (SNEP)	Platinum	200,000^{‡}
Germany (BVMI)	Gold	200,000^{‡}
Italy (FIMI)	Gold	50,000^{‡}
New Zealand (RMNZ)	2× Platinum	60,000^{‡}
Poland (ZPAV)	Platinum	50,000^{‡}
Portugal (AFP)	Gold	5,000^{‡}
Spain (Promusicae)	Gold	30,000^{‡}
Switzerland (IFPI Switzerland)	Platinum	20,000^{‡}
United Kingdom (BPI)	Platinum	600,000^{‡}
United States (RIAA)	Platinum	1,000,000^{‡}
^{‡} Sales+streaming figures based on certification alone.
