= Nico Cartosio =

- Born: May 5, 1978 (age 47); Moscow, USSR
- Genres: post-classic, neo-romantic, film score
- Occupation(s): composer, songwriter, producer
- Instrument: piano
- Website: nicocartosio.com

Nico Cartosio (born Nicola Cartosia, May 5, 1978) is a contemporary classical composer and producer.

== Biography ==
In 1996, because of his parents’ will, Cartosio entered the Faculty of Journalism. After graduation for a long time, his career was related to the media industry. From 2000 to 2012 he worked as an editor, editor-in-chief, copywriter and scriptwriter. Also he directed several documentaries (оne of them is dedicated to the famous Russian-Jewish exiled poet Joseph Brodsky, Nobel laureate in Literature 1987) and wrote soundtracks.

== Music career ==
In 2016, he decided to return to his favorite passion, music, and began to prepare for the release of his first album.

The debut album "Melting" was released in April 2019. It included eight instrumental compositions and one album cover song. Nico recorded this song together with Angelina Jordan, the winner of the 2014 season of Norway's Got Talent. The album was recorded at the legendary Abbey Road Studios in London with the participation of the orchestra, whose musicians worked on the best soundtracks of Hollywood films, conductor Gavin Greenaway (the permanent conductor of the Hans Zimmer Show Orchestra) and soloists John Mills (Violin) and John Lenehan (Piano) got involved.

The album reached number 13 on the Billboard “Classical Crossover Albums” chart and number 18 on the “Classical Albums” world chart.

A single,"Christmas On The Moon", was released in 2018.

In June 2024 Nico presented a new symphonic program «In the beginning was the water». By invitation of the Venice Conservatory and with the support of the Ugo and Olga Levi Foundation, the concert was held in Venice's oldest hall, the Scuola Grande San Giovanni Evangelista.

== Discography ==
=== Studio albums ===
List of studio albums, with selected chart positions
Title	Details	Peak chart positions	
Title	Details	Classical Albums	Classical Crossover Albums
Melting	Released: 17 April 2019; Label: Self Released; Formats: DL, streaming	18	13

=== Compilations ===
- The best of Nico Cartosio (2019)

=== Singles ===
- Long Island Elegy (Original Motion Picture Soundtrack) (2019)
- Siberia (2019)
- Girl on an iceberg (piano version) (2021)

== Music video ==
Nico is also well known to the press for his song's videos. They always tell stories and contain many meanings and images. The video has repeatedly received awards at international festivals.

=== Awards ===
Award	Year (Note: Indicates the year of ceremony. Each year is linked to the article about the awards held that year, wherever possible.)	Recipient(s) and nominee(s)	Category	Result	Ref.
Flickers’ Rhode Island International Film Festival	2019	Snow Above the Earth	Best Music Video	Won	
Scopifest	2019	Cocaine March	Best Music Video	Won	
Austin Music Video Festival	2019	Christmas on The Moon	Best Director	Won	
Bogotá Music Video Festival	2019	Adagio for Strings and Storm	Music video (out of Competition screenings, official selection)	Won	
Bogotá Music Video Festival	2019	Cocaine March	Music video (official selection)	Nominated	
Berlin Music Video Awards	2019	CHRISTMAS ON THE MOON	Best Narrative	Nominated	
Berlin Music Video Awards	2020	ADAGIO FOR STRINGS AND STORM	BEST VFX	Nominated	

== Collaboration ==
Frederick Rousseau, a famous musician who make covers to popular melodies with LED visualization, selected Nico's first album compositions twice for his work: Melting in 2019 and Girl on an iceberg in 2021.
