= Katrine Moholt =

Norwegian television personality and singer

Katrine Moholt (born 21 September 1973 in Nannestad) is a Norwegian television personality and singer.

She started her television career in TV Romerike in 1997, and was hired in TV 2 i 2001. She first hosted some small shows Gjett hva jeg gjør and Tre gode naboer, but later took over Jakten på kjærligheten which became a long-running show. She has also hosted the televised live singalong show Allsang på Grensen. In 2004 she was awarded the Se og Hør readers' TV personality of the year award.

In 2006 she won the first edition of Skal vi danse?, Norway's Dancing with the Stars. In 2008 she debuted with the musical album Sweethearts, which received bad reviews ("die throws") in the media, but sold well. After only four days it received a music recording sales certification, the "gold record".

She resides in Nannestad with Snorre Harstad.

Awards
Preceded by Kristian Valen	Se og Hør's TV Personality of the Year; 2004	Succeeded by Erik Thorstvedt
