= Staff Band of the Norwegian Armed Forces =

- Forsvarets stabsmusikkorps
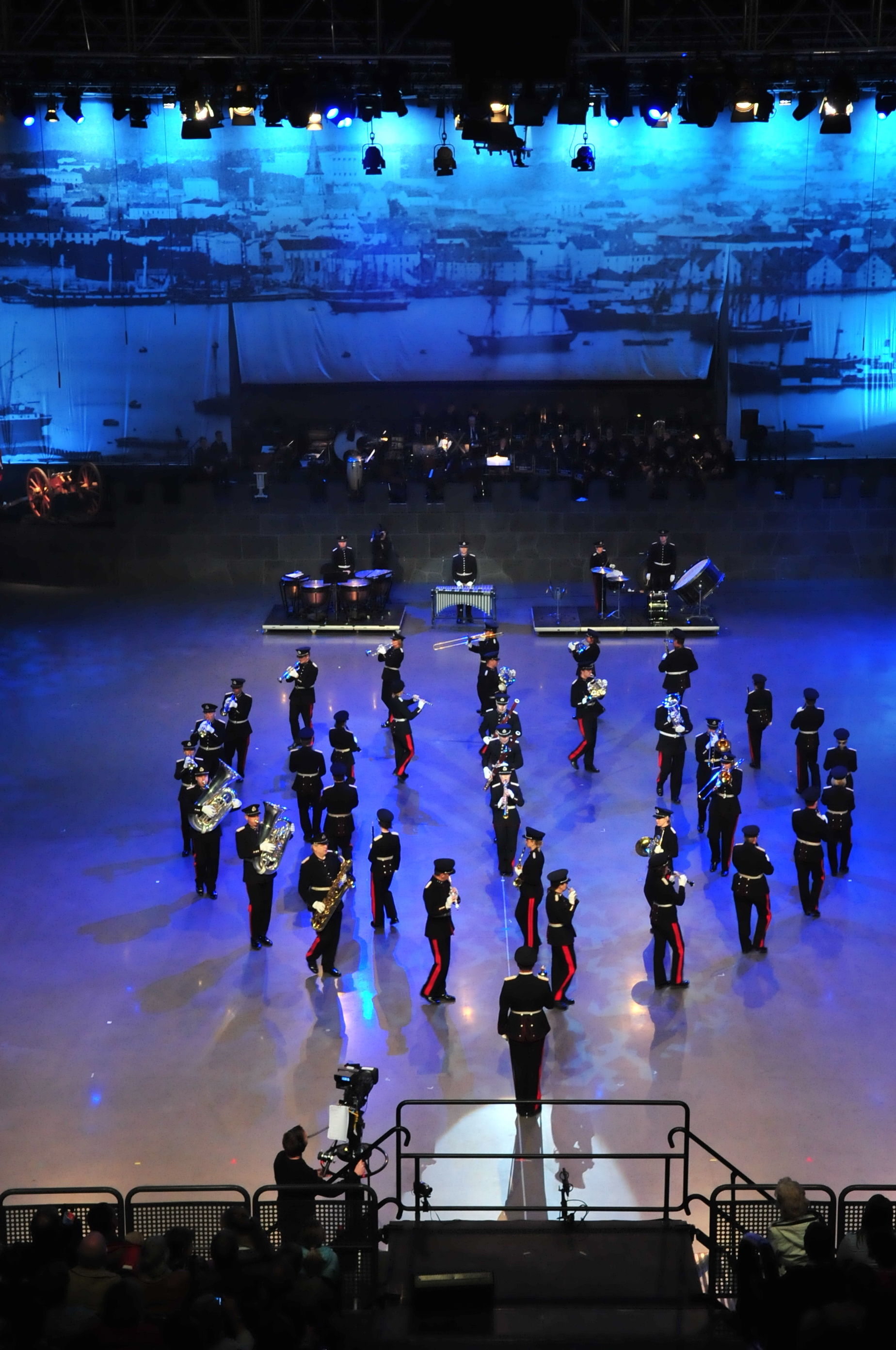
- The band during the 100th anniversary of the Norwegian Air Force.
- Active: 1818–present
- Country: Norway
- Branch: Norwegian Army
- Type: Military band
- Garrison/HQ: Oslo

Commanders
- Director of Music: Major Ståle Hortman
- Artistic Director: Andreas Hanson
- Drum Major: Tommy Markhus Kristoffersen
- Notable commanders: Ole Olsen; Johannes Hanssen

The Staff Band of the Norwegian Armed Forces (Norwegian: Forsvarets stabsmusikkorps, FSMK) is the foremost of the military bands of the Norwegian Armed Forces and Norway's largest professional wind band, employing 39 full-time musicians. The band is based in Oslo and participates in parades and ceremonies for Norwegian royalty, the government and the armed forces, and tours throughout Norway and abroad. In addition, the band has an extensive concert schedule in the Oslo area.

FSMK has strong relations with the Norwegian National Opera, Norwegian Academy of Music, Akershus Fortress Foundation for Art and Culture, Oslo Chamber Music Festival, and Ny Musikkk, the Norwegian section of the International Society for Contemporary Music. The band performs a wide variety of musical styles: classical and contemporary, as well as jazz and pop. FSMK works with renowned conductors from Norway and abroad, on a project basis. The Staff Band's recordings have consistently received critical acclaim.

== History ==
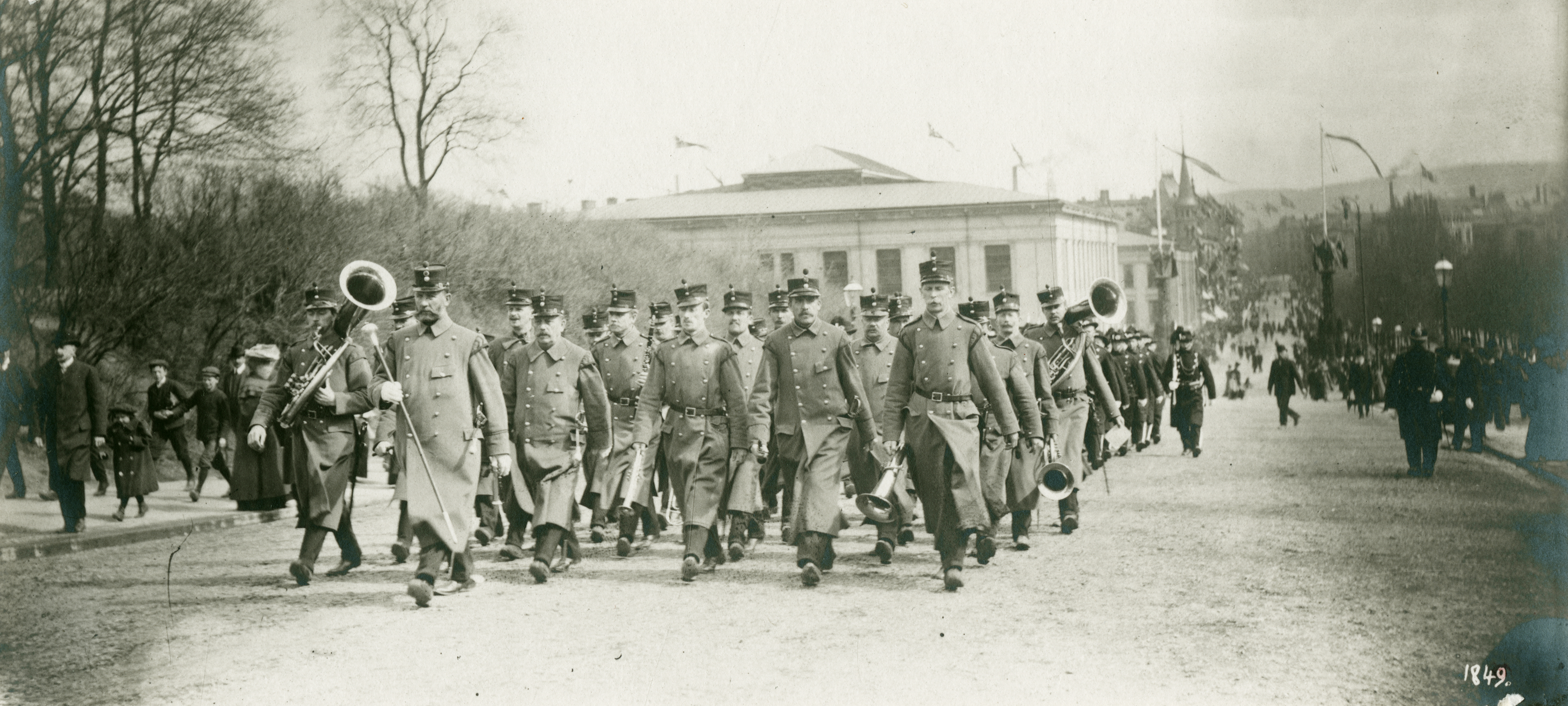
The band in the early 1900s.

Military music in Norway has its roots in the 17th century when the pipers (flautists) together with the drummers made up the first military bands. In 1641, all companies had drummers, pipers, trumpeters and horn players, that formed small ensembles. These ensembles performed different kinds of signals and fanfares at military operations and ceremonies, and were connected to the Akershus fortress. It was in 1818 that the first military ensembles similar to today's bands were created.

Within the Stabsmusikkorps ved Hærordningen of 1817, which was put into effect 1 January 1818, it was decided that the 2nd Agersusiske Brigade would have a military band, and the name was the 2. Brigades Musikkorps (military band). In 1918, all of the brigades were renamed to divisions, and subsequently the band's name changed to the 2nd Division Band. The band had this name until 1953, when the classification into divisions was abandoned, and the band was renamed Forsvarets stabsmusikkorps (Staff Band of the Norwegian Armed Forces).

Historically, a number of famous Norwegian musicians were associated with the band, including Johannes Hanssen, Ole Olsen, Johan Halvorsen, and Johan Svendsen.

In 2018, to commemorate their 200th anniversary, the band released an album with singer Angelina Jordan called It's Magic.

== Ridehuset ==
In October 2007, FSMK moved into the newly refurbished Ridehuset at Akershus festning. Originally a riding stable and then a rehearsal and performance space for Riksteateret (the National Theatre Company), Ridehuset is now the permanent rehearsal and concert arena for Forsvarets stabsmusikkorps. The house holds a large stage, wardrobes, a music library, storage facilities and seating for 200–250 people. Due in part to the excellent acoustics, Ridehuset has become a popular arena for other ensembles in Oslo. The Oslo Philharmonic Orchestra, Oslo Sinfonietta and the Ultima festival, among others, held concerts in Ridehuset during the 2008–09 season.
