= Holter IF =

Norwegian sports club

- Full name: Holter Idrettsforening
- Founded: 3 June 1918
- Ground: Holter stadion
- League: Fourth Division
Home colours

Holter Idrettsforening is a Norwegian sports club from Holter in Nannestad. It has sections for association football and team handball.

It was founded on 3 June 1918. In 1941 it incorporated the AIF club Holter AIL.

The men's football team last played in the Norwegian Second Division in 1997. Players from that time include Snorre Harstad, John Anders Skoglund and Terje Joelsen. The team currently plays in the Fourth Division.
