= List of Dutch Top 40 number-one singles of 2022 =

This is a list of the Dutch Top 40 number-one singles of 2022. The Dutch Top 40 is a chart that ranks the best-performing singles of the Netherlands. It is published every week by radio station Qmusic.

== Chart history ==
Issue date	Song	Artist(s)	Ref.
1 January	"Dat heb jij gedaan"	Meau	
8 January	"Dat heb jij gedaan"	Meau	
15 January	"Dat heb jij gedaan"	Meau	
22 January	"Dat heb jij gedaan"	Meau	
29 January	"Dat heb jij gedaan"	Meau	
5 February	"Dat heb jij gedaan"	Meau	
12 February	"Dat heb jij gedaan"	Meau	
19 February	"Dat heb jij gedaan"	Meau	
26 February	"The Motto"	Tiësto and Ava Max	
5 March	"The Motto"	Tiësto and Ava Max	
12 March	"The Motto"	Tiësto and Ava Max	
19 March	"Hallo"	Antoon	
26 March	"Hallo"	Antoon	
2 April	"Hallo"	Antoon	
9 April	"Hallo"	Antoon	
16 April	"As It Was"	Harry Styles	
23 April	"As It Was"	Harry Styles	
30 April	"As It Was"	Harry Styles	
7 May	"As It Was"	Harry Styles	
14 May	"As It Was"	Harry Styles	
21 May	"De diepte"	S10	
28 May	"As It Was"	Harry Styles	
4 June	"As It Was"	Harry Styles	
11 June	"As It Was"	Harry Styles	
18 June	"As It Was"	Harry Styles	
25 June	"As It Was"	Harry Styles	
2 July	"As It Was"	Harry Styles	
9 July	"As It Was"	Harry Styles	
16 July	"As It Was"	Harry Styles	
23 July	"As It Was"	Harry Styles	
30 July	"As It Was"	Harry Styles	
6 August	"As It Was"	Harry Styles	
13 August	"As It Was"	Harry Styles	
20 August	"As It Was"	Harry Styles	
27 August	"Calm Down"	Rema and Selena Gomez	
3 September	"Calm Down"	Rema and Selena Gomez	
10 September	"Calm Down"	Rema and Selena Gomez	
17 September	"Calm Down"	Rema and Selena Gomez	
24 September	"I'm Good (Blue)"	David Guetta and Bebe Rexha	
1 October	"I'm Good (Blue)"	David Guetta and Bebe Rexha	
8 October	"I'm Good (Blue)"	David Guetta and Bebe Rexha	
15 October	"I'm Good (Blue)"	David Guetta and Bebe Rexha	
22 October	"I'm Good (Blue)"	David Guetta and Bebe Rexha	
29 October	"I'm Good (Blue)"	David Guetta and Bebe Rexha	
5 November	"I'm Good (Blue)"	David Guetta and Bebe Rexha	
12 November	"I'm Good (Blue)"	David Guetta and Bebe Rexha	
19 November	"I'm Good (Blue)"	David Guetta and Bebe Rexha	
26 November	"I'm Good (Blue)"	David Guetta and Bebe Rexha	
3 December	"I'm Good (Blue)"	David Guetta and Bebe Rexha	
10 December	"I'm Good (Blue)"	David Guetta and Bebe Rexha	
17 December	"Ladada (Mon dernier mot)"	Claude	
24 December	"Ladada (Mon dernier mot)"	Claude	
31 December	"Ladada (Mon dernier mot)"	Claude	

== Number-one artists ==
Position	Artist	Weeks No. 1
1	Harry Styles	18
2	David Guetta	12
2	Bebe Rexha	12
3	Meau	8
4	Antoon	4
4	Rema	4
5	Tiësto	3
5	Ava Max	3
5	Claude	3
6	S10	1

== See also ==
- 2022 in music
