= Don't Be Shy (Tiësto and Karol G song) =

2021 single by Tiësto and Karol G

Single by Tiësto and Karol G

from the album Drive
- Released: 12 August 2021
- Genre: Dance-pop
- Length: 2:20
- Label: Musical Freedom; Atlantic
- Songwriters: Tijs Verwest; Carolina Giraldo; Teemu Brunila; Jonas David Kröper; Yoshi Breen
- Producers: Tiësto; Teemu Brunila

Tiësto singles chronology
"The Business Part II" (2021)	"Don't Be Shy" (2021)	"The Motto" (2021)

Karol G singles chronology
"200 Copas" (2021)	"Don't Be Shy" (2021)	"Sejodioto" (2021)

Music video
- "Don't Be Shy" on YouTube

"Don't Be Shy" is a song by Dutch DJ Tiësto and Colombian singer-songwriter Karol G. It was released on 12 August 2021 via Atlantic Records as the second single from Tiësto's seventh studio album Drive. It also marks Karol G's English language debut.

== Critical reception ==
Nancy Gomez of EDM Tunes wrote that the track "comes with an energizing and joyful vibe to bring the madness to the dancefloor or any virtual event."

== Music video ==
The music video was directed by Christian Breslauer, who filmed the music videos for "The Business", "Industry Baby" and "Streets". It starts with an outdoor shot of the Norwegian National Opera and Ballet at the Night, then followed up by the Night at the Museum-inspired music video, comedian Blake Webber plays a museum janitor, and Karol G dances with a group of dancers in different scenes in a museum.

Part two of the music video was released on 4 September 2021.

== Controversies ==
=== Copyright lawsuit ===
Karol G and Tiësto were sued by Cuban-American musician René Lorente, who claimed that their 2021 song "Don't Be Shy" infringed on the copyright of his 1998 track "Algo Diferente". Lorente alleged that both songs had significant similarities in melody, rhythm, harmony, and structure. According to the lawsuit filed in the District Court of Puerto Rico, Lorente sought $3 million in damages, citing mental anguish, humiliation and harm to his reputation.

In July 2025, a federal judge in Miami dismissed the lawsuit, ruling that Lorente's expert witness was unqualified, as their analysis was based on "instinct" rather than solid evidence. Additionally, the defendants denied having access to "Algo Diferente" and the judge determined there was insufficient evidence that Karol G or Tiësto knew of Lorente's song, a key requirement for proving copyright infringement.

== Credits and personnel ==
Credits adapted from Tidal.

- Teemu Brunila – producer, keyboard, programming, writer
- Tiësto – producer, writer
- Dave Kutch – masterer
- Rob Kinelski – mixer
- Karol G – writer
- Jonas David Kröper – writer
- Yoshi Breen – writer

== Charts ==
=== Weekly charts ===
Weekly chart performance for "Don't Be Shy"
Chart (2021–2022)	Peak position
Argentina Hot 100 (Billboard)	3
Belgium (Ultratop 50 Wallonia)	49
Bolivia (Monitor Latino)	5
Brazil (Top 100 Airplay)	10
Canada Hot 100 (Billboard)	79
Chile (Monitor Latino)	14
CIS Airplay (TopHit)	5
Costa Rica (Monitor Latino)	19
Czech Republic Airplay (ČNS IFPI)	3
Czech Republic Singles Digital (ČNS IFPI)	8
Dominican Republic (Monitor Latino)	1
Ecuador (Monitor Latino)	11
El Salvador (Monitor Latino)	6
Germany Airplay (BVMI)	49
Global 200 (Billboard)	55
Greece (IFPI)	61
Honduras (Monitor Latino)	11
Hungary (Dance Top 40)	6
Hungary (Rádiós Top 40)	2
Hungary (Single Top 40)	5
Hungary (Stream Top 40)	22
Ireland (IRMA)	64
Italy (FIMI)	80
Lithuania (AGATA)	12
Luxembourg (ELDO)	9
Mexico (Billboard Mexican Airplay)	1
Netherlands (Dutch Top 40)	16
Netherlands (Single Top 100)	27
New Zealand Hot Singles (RMNZ)	39
Panama (Monitor Latino)	8
Peru (Monitor Latino)	3
Poland Airplay (ZPAV)	4
Portugal (AFP)	74
Romania (Airplay 100)	8
Russia Airplay (TopHit)	2
San Marino (SMRRTV Top 50)	43
Slovakia Airplay (ČNS IFPI)	8
Slovakia Singles Digital (ČNS IFPI)	22
Spain (PROMUSICAE)	58
Sweden (Sverigetopplistan)	51
Switzerland (Schweizer Hitparade)	27
UK Dance (Official Charts)	39
Ukraine Airplay (TopHit)	6
US Bubbling Under Hot 100 (Billboard)	24
US Hot Dance/Electronic Songs (Billboard)	4
US Latin Airplay (Billboard)	43

=== Year-end charts ===
2021 year-end chart performance for "Don't Be Shy"
Chart (2021)	Position
CIS (TopHit)	44
Hungary (Dance Top 40)	52
Hungary (Rádiós Top 40)	87
Hungary (Single Top 40)	19
Hungary (Stream Top 40)	78
Netherlands (Dutch Top 40)	77
Poland (ZPAV)	56
Russia Airplay (TopHit)	41
US Hot Dance/Electronic Songs (Billboard)	15

2022 year-end chart performance for "Don't Be Shy"
Chart (2022)	Position
Croatia (HRT)	41
Global Excl. US (Billboard)	170
Hungary (Dance Top 40)	42
Hungary (Rádiós Top 40)	86
Hungary (Single Top 40)	73
Russia Airplay (TopHit)	41
Ukraine Airplay (TopHit)	17
US Hot Dance/Electronic Songs (Billboard)	35

2023 year-end chart performance for "Don't Be Shy"
Chart (2023)	Position
Ukraine Airplay (TopHit)	71

2024 year-end chart performance for "Don't Be Shy"
Chart (2024)	Position
Lithuania Airplay (TopHit)	124

2025 year-end chart performance for "Don't Be Shy"
Chart (2025)	Position
Belarus Airplay (TopHit)	197
Hungary (Rádiós Top 40)	86
Lithuania Airplay (TopHit)	142

== Certifications ==
Certifications for "Don't Be Shy"
Region	Certification	Certified units/sales
Australia (ARIA)	Gold	35,000^{‡}
Brazil (Pro-Música Brasil)	2× Platinum	80,000^{‡}
Canada (Music Canada)	Platinum	80,000^{‡}
France (SNEP)	Gold	100,000^{‡}
Italy (FIMI)	Platinum	100,000^{‡}
Poland (ZPAV)	2× Platinum	100,000^{‡}
Portugal (AFP)	Gold	5,000^{‡}
Spain (Promusicae)	3× Platinum	180,000^{‡}
United Kingdom (BPI)	Silver	200,000^{‡}
United States (RIAA)	Gold	500,000^{‡}
^{‡} Sales+streaming figures based on certification alone.

== Release history ==
Release history for "Don't Be Shy"
Region	Date	Format	Label	Ref.
Various	12 August 2021	Digital download; streaming	Atlantic	
Russia	25 August 2021	Contemporary hit radio	Sony Music	
Italy	27 August 2021	Contemporary hit radio	Warner	
