= TRXD =

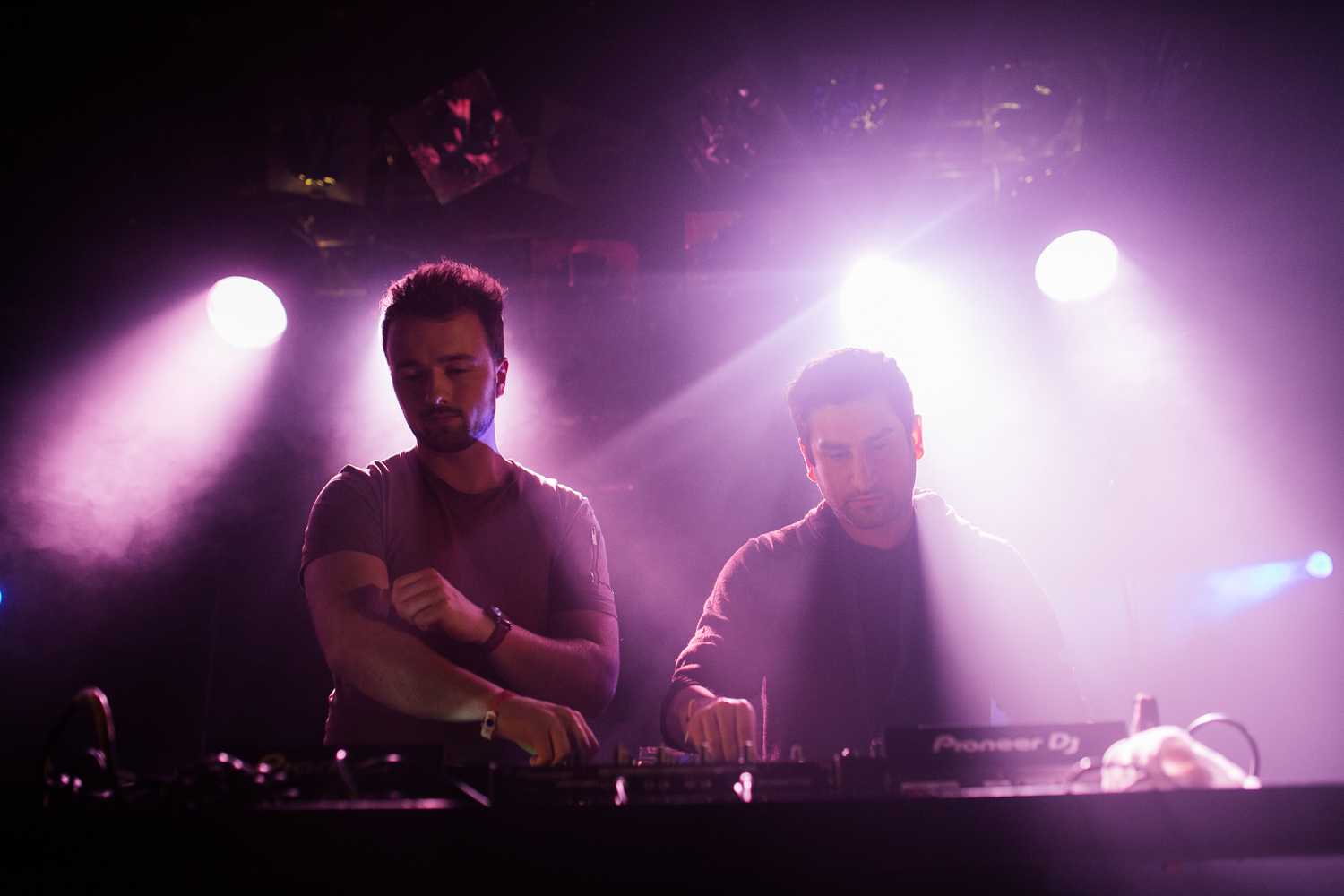
- Left to right: Dyrstad and Atarodiyan

Background information
- Origin: Norway
- Genres: EDM; dance
- Years active: 2015–present
- Labels: Warner Music Norway
- Website: TRXD on Facebook

TRXD is a Norwegian music production duo made up of Truls Dyrstad (born January 25, 1995) and David Atarodiyan (born January 24, 1992), respectively from Mandal and Oslo. The name "TRXD" came from the idea "Truls x David", and is supposed to represent both of their given names.

== Career ==
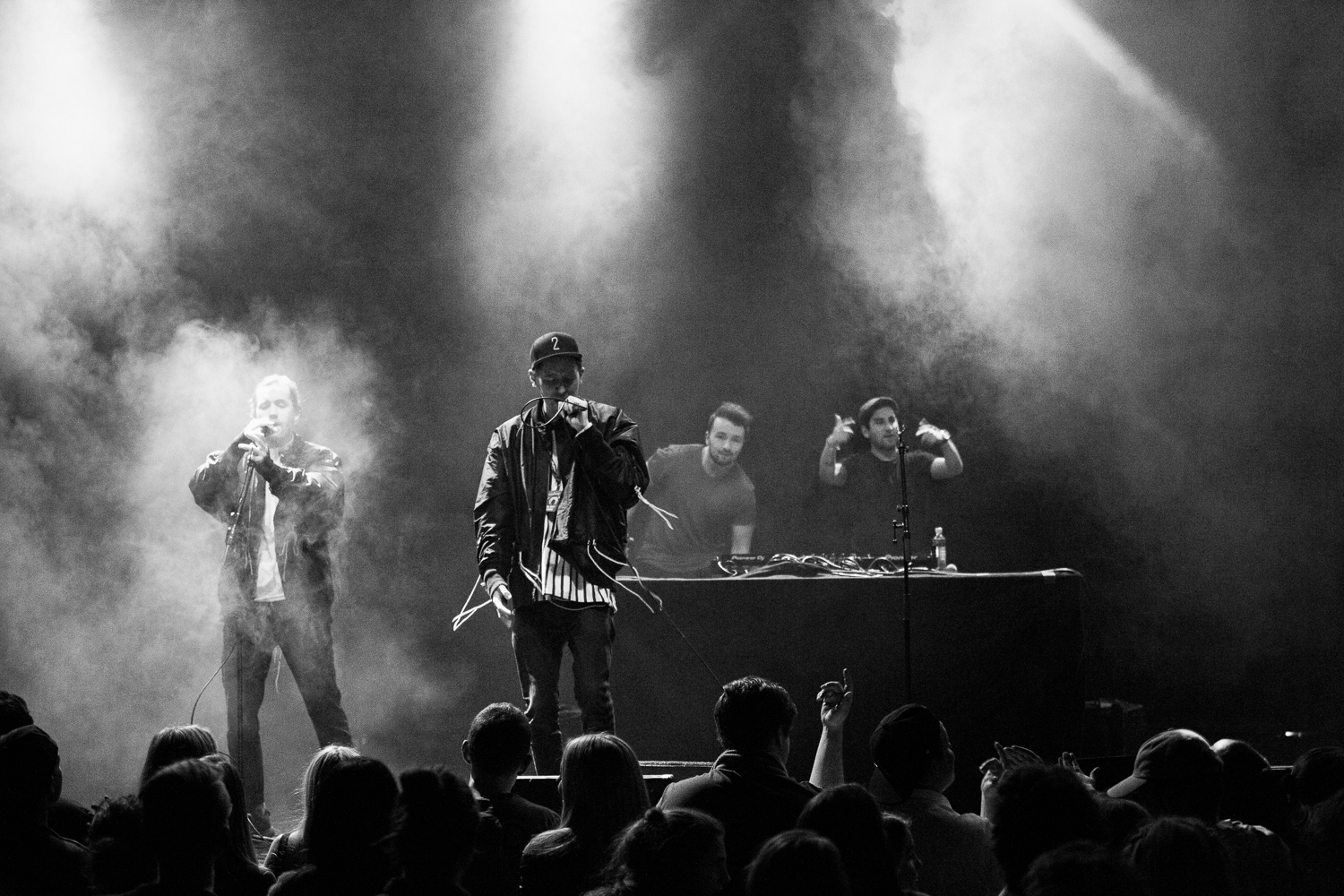
TRXD performing with Skinny Days

Truls Dyrstad showed an early interest in music, and started playing the guitar at a young age before he started to produce music later on. David Atarodiyan didn't start playing or making music until his teens, but quit his job and went on a hiatus abroad to learn as much as possible as quickly as possible. Although they both studied at the University of Agder in Norway, it was a series of coincidences and mutual friends that brought them together.

=== 2015–present ===
TRXD was signed to Warner Music Norway in 2016 after creating a buzz around their remixes, mainly through American music magazine Billboard. They released their first single "Wherever You Go" (featuring Hilde) in April 2016, and the song sold to double platinum by the end of the year. The song also got listed on the official Norwegian chart VG-lista for more than seven weeks, which gave them an opportunity to perform at their official tour 2016. The duo makes vocal EMD-music, but usually don’t sing on their own releases. This has led them to work with other artist, songwriters and vocalists on most of their projects.

TRXD was booked to perform at the Norwegian industry festival by:Larm 2017.

== Discography ==
Singles

- "Wherever You Go" featuring Hilde (2016)
- "Down With the River" featuring Skinny Days (2016)
- "Our City" featuring Emilie Adams (2017)
- "Our City" featuring Emilie Adams (acoustic) (2017)
- "Crazy" (2017)
- "Venn" with Oslo Soul Children featuring Ramón (2017)
- "Above the Water" featuring Angelina Jordan (2020)
