= Snorre Harstad =

Norwegian footballer (born 1971)

Personal information
- Full name: Snorre Midtun Harstad
- Date of birth: 24 January 1971 (age 55)
- Position: Defender

Youth career
- Rælingen
- –1990: Lillestrøm

Senior career*
Years	Team	Apps	(Gls)
1991–1995	Holter		
1996	Lillestrøm	2	(0)
1997–?	Holter		
1999–2000	Eidsvold Turn	34	(3)
2017–2019	Bjerke		
- * Club domestic league appearances and goals

Snorre Harstad (born 24 January 1971) is a retired Norwegian football defender.

He played youth football for Rælingen FK. In 1990 he won the Norway Cup with Lillestrøm SK, but was not given a senior contract and instead joined Holter IF. Having become their player of the year in 1995, he finally signed for Lillestrøm ahead of the 1996 season, for 110,000 kr. He left the club for Holter IF ahead of the 1997 season. He later played 34 games for Eidsvold Turn in 1999 and 2000. In 2017 he sign for Bjerke IL. In the season 2018 and 2019 he has been the captain for the team.

He is married to Katrine Moholt, and they live in Nannestad.
