= Skinny Days =

Norwegian musical duo

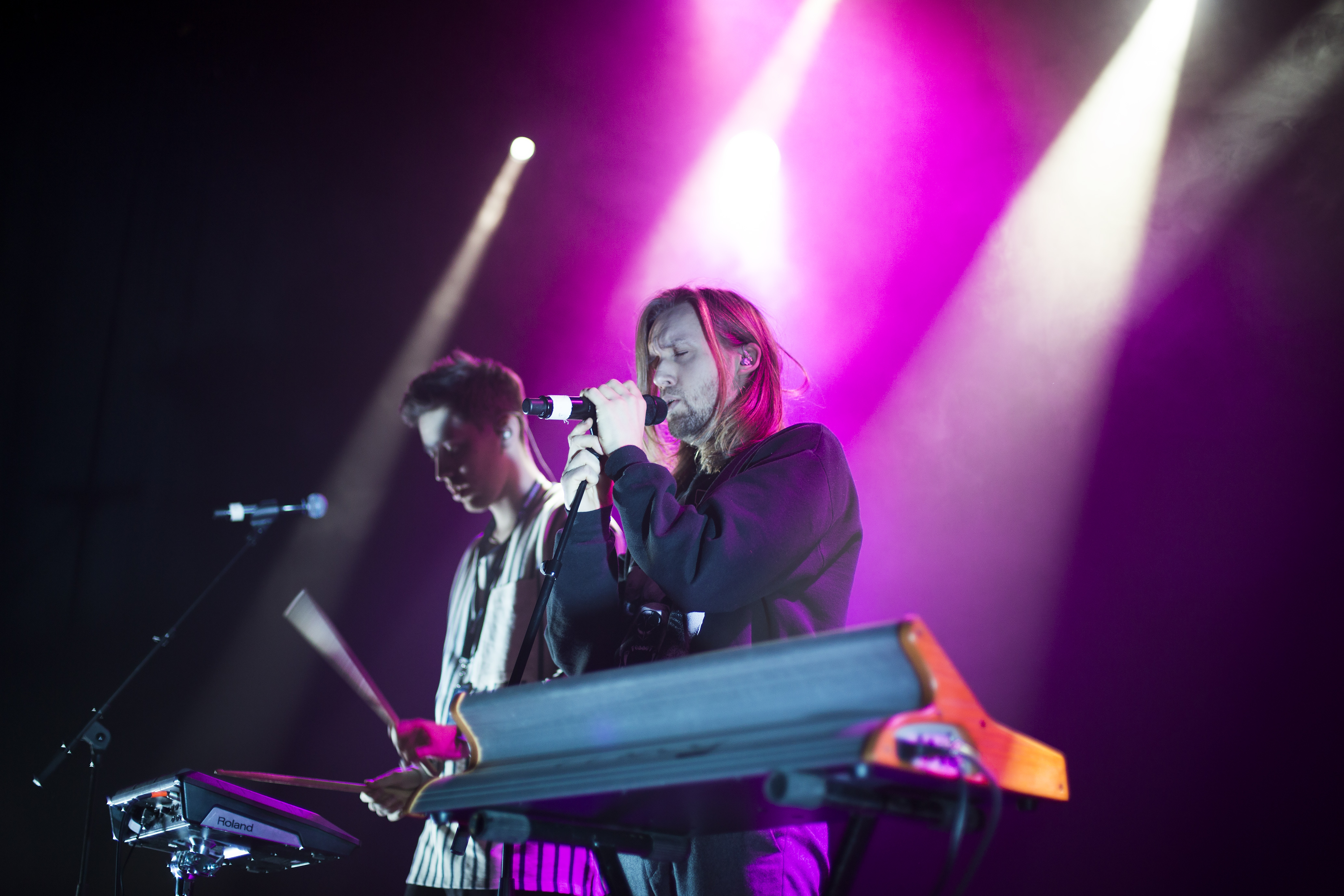
- Left to right: Halvor Folstad and Dag Holtan-Hartwig

Background information
- Origin: Norway
- Genres: pop
- Occupation(s): songwriters, producers, artists
- Years active: 2015–present
- Labels: Warner Norway
- Members: Dag Holtan-Hartwig; Halvor Folstad
- Website: http://www.skinnydays.com/

Skinny Days is a Norwegian music duo made up of Dag Holtan-Hartwig (born April 16, 1991) and Halvor Folstad (born December 11, 1989) signed to Warner Music Norway. They started out as producers and songwriters for other artists before releasing their debut single «Alright Right Now» in 2015 under the collective name Skinny Days.

== Career ==
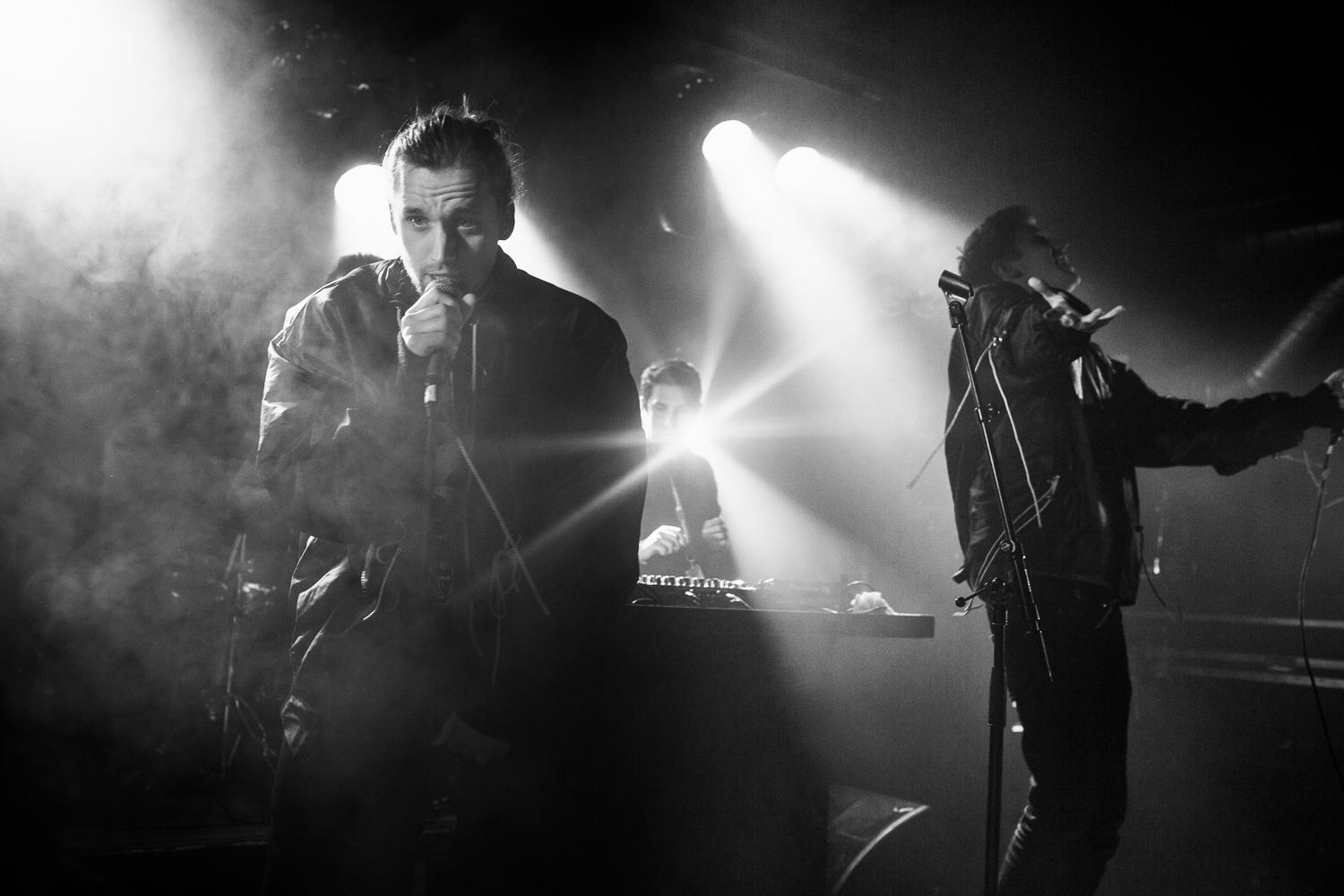
Skinny Days performing with TRXD

Holtan-Hartwig and Folstad met in 2010 at Liverpool Institute for Performing Arts (LIPA), and started working together as producers and songwriters for other artists. They have worked on songs for and with artists such as SVAL, Julie Bergan, Ylvis, Norah Benatia and OMVR. They their debut single "Alright Right Now" was released in 2015. They are known for their specific combination of Scandinavian melancholy and club music.

=== Live ===
The duo has performed at the Norwegian industry festival and showcase by:Larm two years in a row. First in 2016 and again as featuring artists in 2017. They have performed at the X-Games Hafjell (2017) and Trondheim Calling along with artists like Julie Bergan, Mugisho and TRXD. Since their debut they have also performed at a number of student bars, festivals and local arenas across Norway.

== Discography ==
=== Singles ===
As lead artist

- "Alright Right Now" (2015)
- "We Got Something" (2015)
- "If I Was a Sailor" (2015)
- "If I Was a Sailor" (acoustic) (2015)
- "In a Good Way" (2016)
- "Home" (2016)
- "The One That Got Away" (featuring Emilie Adams) (2017)

As featured artist

- "Down with the River" (Trxd featuring Skinny Days) (2016)
- "Famous" (Tungevaag, Vlade Kay, and Jonth featuring Skinny Days) (2021)
