= Slopes (musician) =

Norwegian singer, composer and music producer

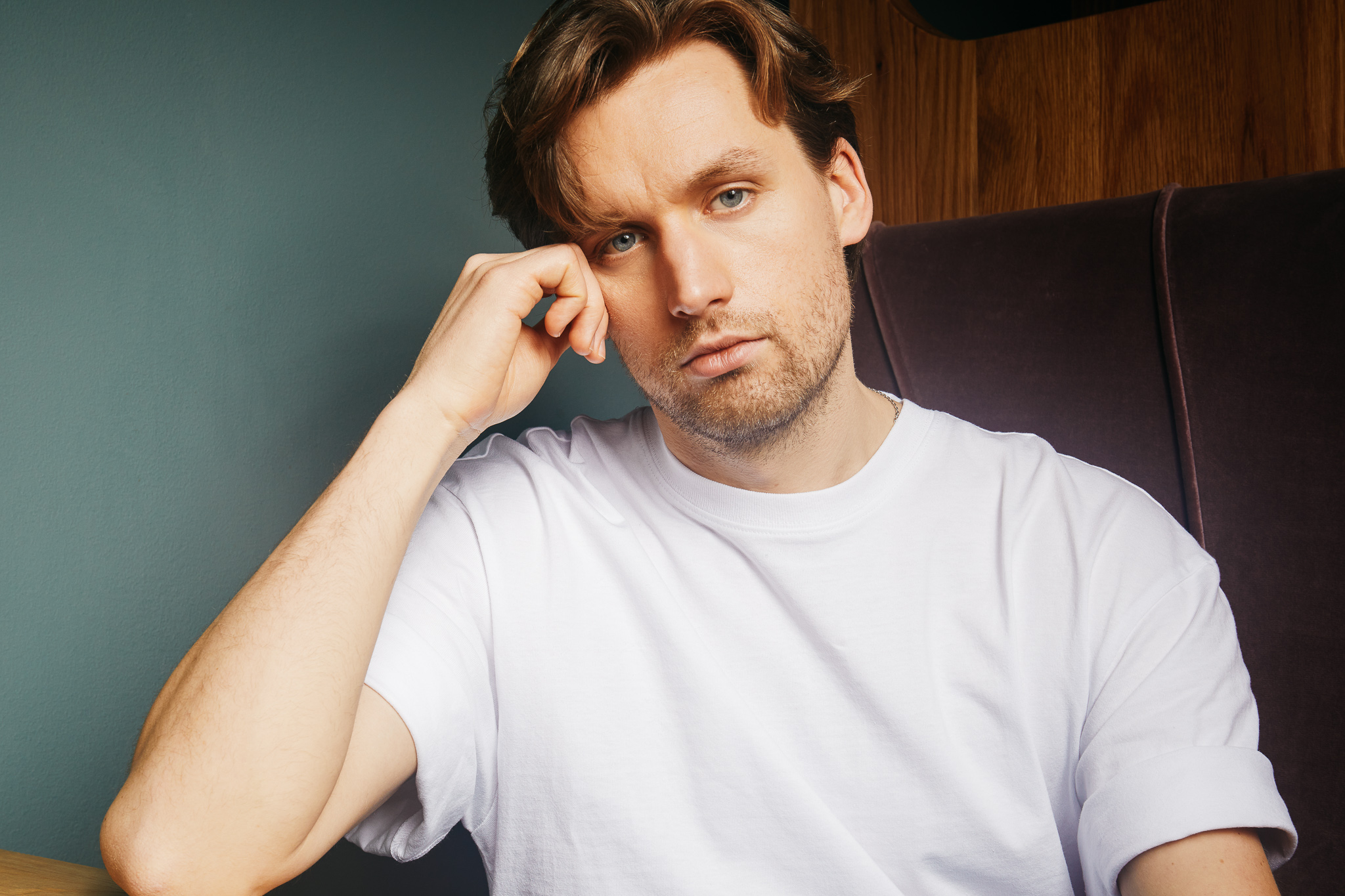
- Slopes (2021)

Background information
- Born: Dag Holtan-Hartwig; 16 April 1991 (age 34); Norway
- Occupations: Singer; songwriter; composer; music producer
- Years active: 2015–present
- Website: slopestheartist.com

Dag Holtan-Hartwig (born April 16, 1991), known professionally as Slopes, is a Norwegian singer, composer and music producer.

== Biography ==
Holtan-Hartwig grew up in a musical family in a suburb of Oslo and began playing in bands at the age of twelve. In England, he enrolled at the Liverpool Institute for Performing Arts (LIPA) and performed there in front of Sir Paul McCartney, who gave him important advice. At LIPA, he met fellow Norwegian singer Halvor Folstad and started to work with him. Both got a record contract in Norway. After the training they went their separate ways. Folstad returned to Oslo, and Holtan-Hartwig worked as a producer in London and later in Los Angeles. Returning to Oslo, Holtan-Hartwig and Folstad formed the duo Skinny Days in 2015 and released their debut single Alright Right Now. As songwriters and producers for other artists, Folstad and Holtan-Hartwig have been responsible for billions of streams for artists such as Ava Max, Alan Walker, SeeB, and Julie Bergan.

As Slopes, Dag Holtan-Hartwig has been performing solo since 2021. To that end, he signed a contract with Warner Music.

== Discography ==
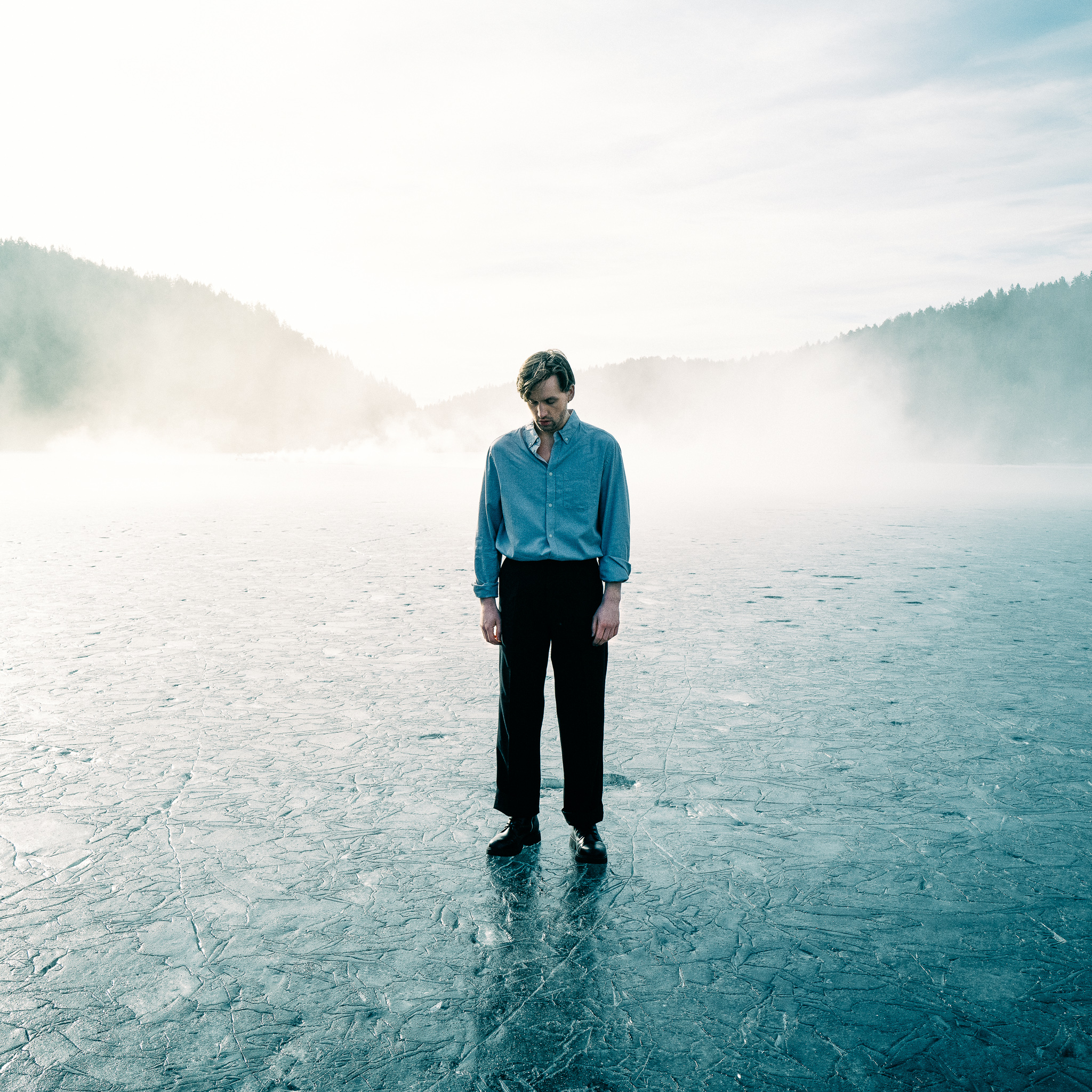
Slopes

=== Slopes ===
- Prove Them Wrong (2021)

==== As part of Skinny Days ====
- Alright Right Now (2015)
- We Got Something (2015)
- If I Was A Sailor (2015)
- If I Was A Sailor (acoustic) (2015)
- In A Good Way (2016)
- Home (2016)
- The One That Got Away (featuring Emilie Adams) (2017)

=== Composer (selection) ===
- Vidorra (Martin Tungevaag) (2014)
- Kids (Fanny Andersen) (2017)
- Guilt Trip (Julie Bergan) (2018)
- Vultures (Peder Elias) (2018)
- Not Gonna Cry (Emma Steinbakken) (2019)
- September (Emma Steinbakken) (2020)
- Alone Pt. II (Alan Walker & Ava Max) (2020)
- Blø for deg (Emir) (2020)
- Voices in my Head (Skinny Days & CLMD) (2020)
- Foolish Girl (Kamara Young Dumb) (2021)
- How Can I Forget Her* (Skinny Days/Lovespeake/TwoWorldsApart) (2021)

=== Solo releases ===
- Down with the River — (Trxd featuring Skinny Days) (2016)
- Famous — (Tungevaag, Vlade Kay, and Jonth featuring Skinny Days) (2021)

== Chart ==
Title	Charts positions		
Title	GER	AUT	SWI
"Vidorra" with Martin Tungevaag (2014)	72		
"Alone, Pt. II " with Alan Walker&Ava Max (2020)	47	45	47
