= Allsang på Grensen =

Norwegian musical entertainment programme

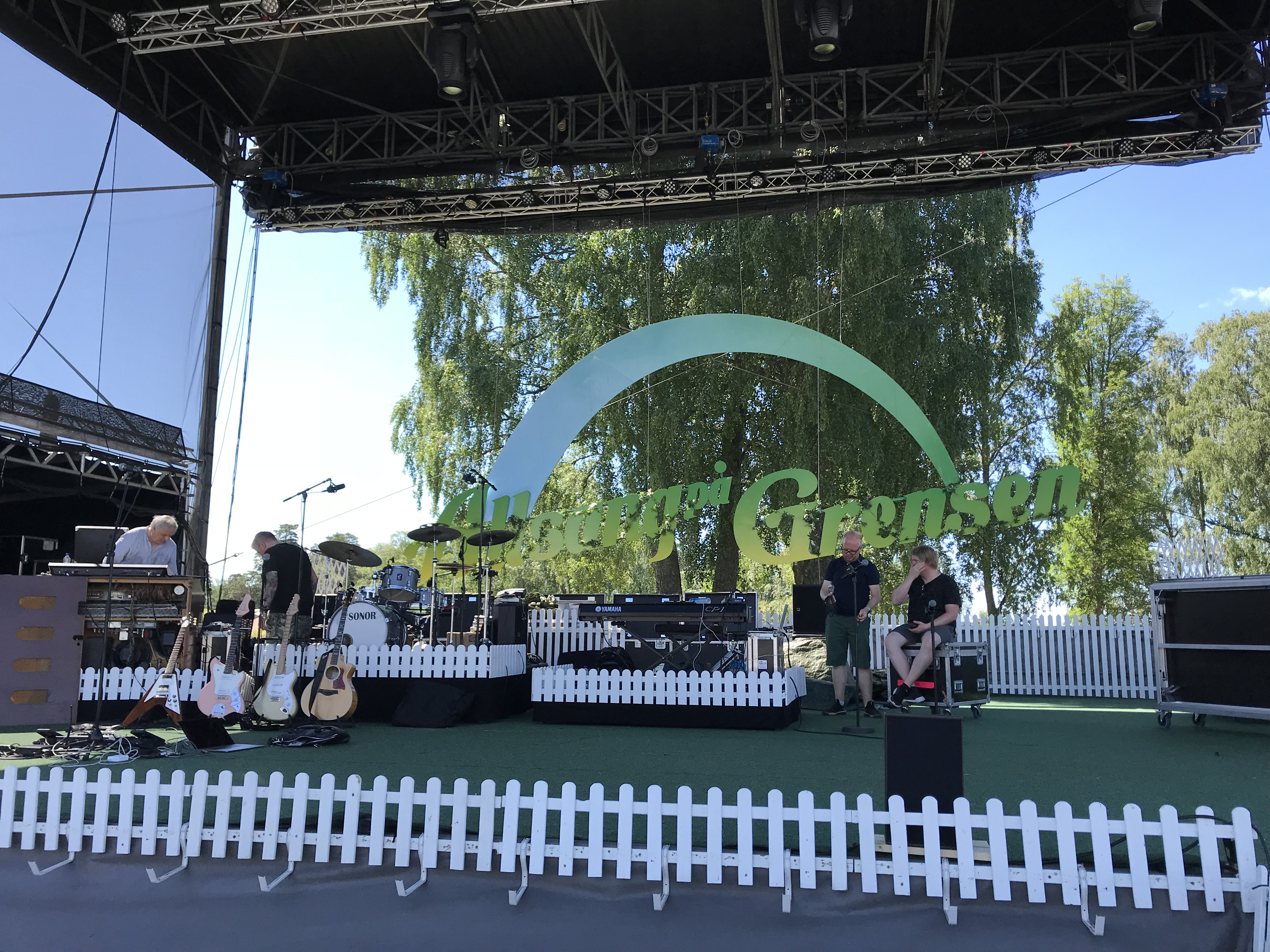
- The Allsang på Grensen stage in June 2018.
- Based on: Allsång på Skansen
- Presented by: Katrine Moholt (2007–2022) Tommy Steine (2007–2009)
- Country of origin: Norway
- Original language: Norwegian
- No. of seasons: 16

Original release
- Network: TV 2
- Release: 29 June 2007 – 30 July 2022

Allsang på Grensen (lit. 'Sing-along at the Border') was a Norwegian musical entertainment programme broadcast every summer on TV 2 between 2007 and 2022. Based on the Swedish programme Allsång på Skansen, it was hosted by Katrine Moholt with Tommy Steine serving as co-presenter for a few seasons. The programme was recorded at Fredriksten Fortress in Halden.

The premiere season in 2007 was watched by 402,000 people, while the 2008 season was watched by 399,000 and the 2009 season by 385,000. The 2012 season was watched by 316,000 people, and the 2014 season by 336,000.

Over 400 artists have performed at Allsang på Grensen. D.D.E. was the band that performed there the most.

In January 2022, TV2 announced that the 16th season would be the show's last.
