= The Business (Tiësto song) =

Single by Tiësto

from the album Drive
- Released: 25 September 2020
- Genre: Deep house
- Length: 2:44
- Label: Musical Freedom; Atlantic
- Songwriters: Tijs Verwest; James Bell; Julia Karlsson; Anton Rundberg
- Producers: Tiësto; Hightower

Tiësto singles chronology
| "Coffee (Give Me Something)" (2020) | "The Business" (2020) | "The Business Part II" (2021) |

"The Business Part II"
- Part II cover

Tiësto singles chronology
| "The Business" (2020) | "The Business; Part II" (2021) | "Don't Be Shy" (2021) |

Ty Dolla Sign singles chronology
| "Spicy" (2020) | "The Business; Part II" (2021) | "By Yourself" (2021) |

"The Business" is a song by Dutch DJ and producer Tiësto, with uncredited vocals from James "Yami" Bell. It was released on 25 September 2020 as the lead single from his seventh studio album Drive.

At the APRA Music Awards of 2022, the song was nominated for Most Performed International Work.

== Music video ==
The music video premiered on Tiësto's official YouTube channel on 24 September 2020. Directed by Christian Breslauer, it features US dancers Casey Frey and Kyla Bullings. According to Jason Heffler from edm.com, Frey's "intoxicating dance interpretation is a fantastic accompaniment to the haunting sonic flair". International airings of the music video remove the segment in which Frey's character is run over, thereby also removing the second refrain from the song.

== Cover art ==
The cover art was made by the visual artist Victor Scorrano.

== Remixes ==
A remix by British DJ and producer 220 Kid was released on 11 December 2020, which premiered on Tiësto's YouTube channel. There is also another version, titled "The Business Part II", which is a collaboration with US hip-hop/R&B artist Ty Dolla Sign, released on 21 January 2021. Another version of this song was released by The Marshall Project titled "Let's Get Down To Business" in 2021.

== Formats and releases ==
Digital download - Europe

1. "The Business" – 2:44

Digital download - US

1. "The Business" (Extended Mix) – 3:46
2. "The Business" – 2:44

Digital download - 220 Kid Remix

1. "The Business" (220 Kid Remix) - 3:19
2. "The Business" - 2:44

Digital download - It's Dynamite Remix

1. "The Business" (It's Dynamite Remix) - 1:17

Digital download - Part II

1. "The Business Part II" - 2:44
2. "The Business" - 2:44

Digital download - Part II (Clean Bandit Remix)

1. "The Business Part II" (Clean Bandit Remix) - 3:04
2. "The Business Part II" - 2:44
3. "The Business" - 2:44

Digital download - SWACQ Remix

1. "The Business" (SWACQ Remix) - 2:49

Digital download - Vintage Culture & Dubdogz Remix

1. "The Business" (Vintage Culture & Dubdogz Remix) - 3:09

Digital download - Remixes

1. "The Business" (Vintage Culture & Dubdogz Remix) - 3:09
2. "The Business" (SWACQ Remix) - 2:49
3. "The Business" (220 Kid Remix) - 3:19
4. "The Business" (Sparkee Remix) - 3:02
5. "The Business Part II" (Clean Bandit Remix) - 3:04
6. "The Business Part II" - 2:44

== Charts ==
=== Weekly charts ===
2020–2022 weekly chart performance for "The Business"
| Chart (2020–2022) | Peak position |
|---|---|
| Australia (ARIA) | 4 |
| Austria (Ö3 Austria Top 40) | 6 |
| Belgium (Ultratop 50 Flanders) | 2 |
| Belgium (Ultratop 50 Wallonia) | 2 |
| Brazil (Top 100 Brasil) | 97 |
| Bulgaria Airplay (PROPHON) | 7 |
| Canada Hot 100 (Billboard) | 13 |
| Canada CHR/Top 40 (Billboard) | 17 |
| Canada AC (Billboard) | 46 |
| CIS Airplay (TopHit) | 1 |
| Croatia International Airplay (Top lista) | 2 |
| Czech Republic Airplay (ČNS IFPI) | 3 |
| Czech Republic Singles Digital (ČNS IFPI) | 1 |
| Denmark (Tracklisten) | 4 |
| Finland (Suomen virallinen lista) | 15 |
| France (SNEP) | 62 |
| Germany (GfK) | 3 |
| Global 200 (Billboard) | 12 |
| Greece International (IFPI) | 5 |
| Hungary (Dance Top 40) | 1 |
| Hungary (Rádiós Top 40) | 6 |
| Hungary (Single Top 40) | 1 |
| Hungary (Stream Top 40) | 1 |
| Iceland (Tónlistinn) | 10 |
| Ireland (IRMA) | 1 |
| Israel International Airplay (Media Forest) | 2 |
| Italy (FIMI) | 34 |
| Lebanon (Lebanese Top 20) | 2 |
| Lithuania (AGATA) | 1 |
| Mexico Airplay (Billboard) | 3 |
| Netherlands (Dutch Top 40) | 1 |
| Netherlands (Single Top 100) | 1 |
| New Zealand (Recorded Music NZ) | 21 |
| Norway (VG-lista) | 10 |
| Poland Airplay (ZPAV) | 2 |
| Portugal (AFP) | 7 |
| Romania (Airplay 100) | 1 |
| Russia Airplay (TopHit) | 2 |
| Slovakia Airplay (ČNS IFPI) | 1 |
| Slovakia Singles Digital (ČNS IFPI) | 1 |
| South Africa Streaming (TOSAC) | 2 |
| Spain (Promusicae) | 37 |
| Sweden (Sverigetopplistan) | 11 |
| Switzerland (Schweizer Hitparade) | 4 |
| Ukraine Airplay (TopHit) | 3 |
| UK Singles (Official Charts) | 3 |
| UK Dance (Official Charts) | 2 |
| US Billboard Hot 100 | 69 |
| US Hot Dance/Electronic Songs (Billboard) | 2 |
| US Pop Airplay (Billboard) | 24 |
| US Rhythmic Airplay (Billboard) | 34 |

2023 weekly chart performance for "The Business"
| Chart (2023) | Peak position |
|---|---|
| Belarus Airplay (TopHit) | 80 |
| CIS Airplay (TopHit) | 126 |
| Kazakhstan Airplay (TopHit) | 68 |
| Lithuania Airplay (TopHit) | 126 |
| Moldova Airplay (TopHit) | 48 |
| Romania Airplay (TopHit) | 97 |
| Ukraine Airplay (TopHit) | 51 |

2024 weekly chart performance for "The Business"
| Chart (2024) | Peak position |
|---|---|
| Belarus Airplay (TopHit) | 138 |
| CIS Airplay (TopHit) | 176 |
| Kazakhstan Airplay (TopHit) | 146 |
| Lithuania Airplay (TopHit) | 87 |
| Moldova Airplay (TopHit) | 64 |
| Romania Airplay (TopHit) | 114 |

2025 weekly chart performance for "The Business"
| Chart (2025) | Peak position |
|---|---|
| Belarus Airplay (TopHit) | 119 |
| CIS Airplay (TopHit) | 175 |
| Kazakhstan Airplay (TopHit) | 118 |
| Lithuania Airplay (TopHit) | 85 |
| Moldova Airplay (TopHit) | 48 |
| Romania Airplay (TopHit) | 92 |

2026 weekly chart performance for "The Business"
| Chart (2026) | Peak position |
|---|---|
| Belarus Airplay (TopHit) | 99 |

Weekly chart performance for "The Business, Pt. II"
| Chart (2021) | Peak position |
|---|---|
| Hungary (Rádiós Top 40) | 28 |
| Hungary (Single Top 40) | 25 |
| New Zealand Hot Singles (RMNZ) | 33 |
| Sweden Heatseeker (Sverigetopplistan) | 20 |

=== Monthly charts ===
2020 monthly chart performance for "The Business"
| Chart (2020) | Peak position |
|---|---|
| CIS Airplay (TopHit) | 3 |
| Russia Airplay (TopHit) | 2 |
| Ukraine Airplay (TopHit) | 49 |

2021 monthly chart performance for "The Business"
| Chart (2021) | Peak position |
|---|---|
| CIS Airplay (TopHit) | 1 |
| Russia Airplay (TopHit) | 2 |
| Ukraine Airplay (TopHit) | 6 |

2022 monthly chart performance for "The Business"
| Chart (2022) | Peak position |
|---|---|
| CIS Airplay (TopHit) | 55 |
| Russia Airplay (TopHit) | 89 |
| Ukraine Airplay (TopHit) | 66 |

2023 monthly chart performance for "The Business"
| Chart (2023) | Peak position |
|---|---|
| Belarus Airplay (TopHit) | 91 |
| Moldova Airplay (TopHit) | 63 |
| Ukraine Airplay (TopHit) | 76 |

2024 monthly chart performance for "The Business"
| Chart (2024) | Peak position |
|---|---|
| Lithuania Airplay (TopHit) | 96 |

2025 monthly chart performance for "The Business"
| Chart (2025) | Peak position |
|---|---|
| Moldova Airplay (TopHit) | 75 |

=== Year-end charts ===
2020 year-end chart performance for "The Business"
| Chart (2020) | Position |
|---|---|
| CIS Airplay (TopHit) | 108 |
| Hungary (Dance Top 40) | 39 |
| Hungary (Single Top 40) | 56 |
| Netherlands (Dutch Top 40) | 34 |
| Netherlands (Single Top 100) | 71 |
| Russia Airplay (TopHit) | 114 |
| US Hot Dance/Electronic Songs (Billboard) | 94 |

2021 year-end chart performance for "The Business"
| Chart (2021) | Position |
|---|---|
| Australia (ARIA) | 10 |
| Austria (Ö3 Austria Top 40) | 9 |
| Belgium (Ultratop Flanders) | 3 |
| Belgium (Ultratop Wallonia) | 13 |
| Brazil Streaming (Pro-Música Brasil) | 135 |
| Canada (Canadian Hot 100) | 19 |
| CIS Airplay (TopHit) | 2 |
| Denmark (Tracklisten) | 17 |
| France (SNEP) | 110 |
| Germany (Official German Charts) | 3 |
| Global 200 (Billboard) | 20 |
| Hungary (Dance Top 40) | 1 |
| Hungary (Rádiós Top 40) | 8 |
| Hungary (Single Top 40) | 6 |
| Hungary (Stream Top 40) | 2 |
| Iceland (Tónlistinn) | 22 |
| Ireland (IRMA) | 9 |
| Netherlands (Dutch Top 40) | 18 |
| Netherlands (Single Top 100) | 7 |
| New Zealand (Recorded Music NZ) | 37 |
| Norway (VG-lista) | 20 |
| Poland (ZPAV) | 37 |
| Portugal (AFP) | 13 |
| Russia Airplay (TopHit) | 6 |
| Spain (PROMUSICAE) | 90 |
| Sweden (Sverigetopplistan) | 38 |
| Switzerland (Schweizer Hitparade) | 7 |
| Ukraine Airplay (TopHit) | 12 |
| UK Singles (OCC) | 16 |
| US Hot Dance/Electronic Songs (Billboard) | 3 |

2022 year-end chart performance for "The Business"
| Chart (2022) | Position |
|---|---|
| CIS Airplay (TopHit) | 64 |
| Global Excl. US (Billboard) | 179 |
| Hungary (Dance Top 40) | 18 |
| Hungary (Rádiós Top 40) | 8 |
| Hungary (Single Top 40) | 68 |
| Russia Airplay (TopHit) | 174 |
| Ukraine Airplay (TopHit) | 61 |

2023 year-end chart performance for "The Business"
| Chart (2023) | Position |
|---|---|
| Belarus Airplay (TopHit) | 192 |
| CIS Airplay (TopHit) | 193 |
| Hungary (Rádiós Top 40) | 97 |
| Kazakhstan Airplay (TopHit) | 175 |
| Moldova Airplay (TopHit) | 172 |
| Romania Airplay (TopHit) | 185 |

2024 year-end chart performance for "The Business"
| Chart (2024) | Position |
|---|---|
| Hungary (Rádiós Top 40) | 58 |
| Lithuania Airplay (TopHit) | 71 |

2025 year-end chart performance for "The Business"
| Chart (2025) | Position |
|---|---|
| Belarus Airplay (TopHit) | 154 |
| Hungary (Rádiós Top 40) | 75 |
| Lithuania Airplay (TopHit) | 104 |
| Romania Airplay (TopHit) | 197 |

=== Decade-end charts ===
20s Decade-end chart performance for "The Business"
| Chart (2020–2025) | Position |
|---|---|
| Belarus Airplay (TopHit) | 9 |
| CIS Airplay (TopHit) | 6 |
| Kazakhstan Airplay (TopHit) | 92 |
| Lithuania Airplay (TopHit) | 122 |
| Moldova Airplay (TopHit) | 29 |
| Romania Airplay (TopHit) | 2 |
| Russia Airplay (TopHit) | 12 |
| Ukraine Airplay (TopHit) | 52 |

== Certifications ==
Certifications and sales for "The Business"
| Region | Certification | Certified units/sales |
|---|---|---|
| Australia (ARIA) | 5× Platinum | 350,000^{‡} |
| Austria (IFPI Austria) | 3× Platinum | 90,000^{‡} |
| Belgium (BRMA) | Platinum | 40,000^{‡} |
| Brazil (Pro-Música Brasil) | 2× Diamond | 320,000^{‡} |
| Canada (Music Canada) | 8× Platinum | 640,000^{‡} |
| Denmark (IFPI Danmark) | 2× Platinum | 180,000^{‡} |
| France (SNEP) | Diamond | 333,333^{‡} |
| Germany (BVMI) | 3× Gold | 600,000^{‡} |
| Italy (FIMI) | Platinum | 70,000^{‡} |
| New Zealand (RMNZ) | 3× Platinum | 90,000^{‡} |
| Poland (ZPAV) | Diamond | 250,000^{‡} |
| Portugal (AFP) | 3× Platinum | 30,000^{‡} |
| Spain (Promusicae) | 2× Platinum | 120,000^{‡} |
| United Kingdom (BPI) | 2× Platinum | 1,200,000^{‡} |
| United States (RIAA) | Platinum | 1,000,000^{‡} |
^{‡} Sales+streaming figures based on certification alone.

== Usage in media ==
"The Business" appeared in the opening montage of Hockey Night in Canada's coverage of Game 4 of the 2021 Stanley Cup Finals between the Montreal Canadiens and the Tampa Bay Lightning. It has also been used as the music that precedes kick off in every match of the 2022 FIFA World Cup, 2023 AFC Asian Cup and 2025 FIFA Arab Cup in Qatar.

== Release history ==
| Region | Date | Format | Version | Label(s) | Ref. |
|---|---|---|---|---|---|
| Various | September 25, 2020 | Digital download; streaming | Original | Musical Freedom; Atlantic | |
| Italy | September 25, 2020 | Contemporary hit radio | Original | Warner | |
| Various | December 12, 2020 | Digital download; streaming | 220 Kid remix | Musical Freedom; Atlantic | |
| Various | January 21, 2021 | Digital download; streaming | Pt. II with Ty Dolla Sign | Musical Freedom; Atlantic | |
| United Kingdom | January 22, 2021 | Contemporary hit radio | Original | Musical Freedom; Atlantic | |
| Various | March 5, 2021 | Digital download; streaming | Pt. II (Clean Bandit remix) | Musical Freedom; Atlantic | |

== See also ==
- List of Billboard number-one dance songs of 2020
- List of number-one dance singles of 2021 (Australia)
- List of top 10 singles for 2021 in Australia
- List of Dutch Top 40 number-one singles of 2021
- List of number-one singles of 2021 (Ireland)
- List of top 10 singles in 2021 (Ireland)
- List of Airplay 100 number ones of the 2020s
- List of Media Forest most-broadcast songs of the 2020s in Romania
- The Box
