= List of number-one singles of 2025 (Indonesia) =

This is a list of the number-one singles of 2025 in Indonesia, highlighting singles that reached the top position on two major music charts: Billboard Indonesia Songs and The Official Indonesia Chart. These charts serve as key indicators of a song's popularity in the country, utilizing different methodologies and sources for their rankings.

== Billboard Indonesia Songs ==
Indonesia Songs is a record chart in Indonesia for songs, compiled by Billboard since February 2022. The chart is updated every Tuesday on Billboard's website. The chart ranks the top 25 songs weekly in Indonesia. The data for the chart are provided by Luminate based on weekly digital downloads and online streaming.

=== Chart history ===
List of number-one singles
Issue date	Song	Artist(s)	Ref.
4 January	"Blue"	Yung Kai	
11 January	"Blue"	Yung Kai	
18 January	"Blue"	Yung Kai	
25 January	"Garam & Madu (Sakit Dadaku)"	Tenxi, Jemsii, & Naykilla	
1 February	"Garam & Madu (Sakit Dadaku)"	Tenxi, Jemsii, & Naykilla	
8 February	"Garam & Madu (Sakit Dadaku)"	Tenxi, Jemsii, & Naykilla	
15 February	"Garam & Madu (Sakit Dadaku)"	Tenxi, Jemsii, & Naykilla	
22 February	"Garam & Madu (Sakit Dadaku)"	Tenxi, Jemsii, & Naykilla	
1 March	"Garam & Madu (Sakit Dadaku)"	Tenxi, Jemsii, & Naykilla	
8 March	"Garam & Madu (Sakit Dadaku)"	Tenxi, Jemsii, & Naykilla	
15 March	"Garam & Madu (Sakit Dadaku)"	Tenxi, Jemsii, & Naykilla	
22 March	"Garam & Madu (Sakit Dadaku)"	Tenxi, Jemsii, & Naykilla	
29 March	"Aku Dah Lupa"	MikkyZia	
5 April	"Garam & Madu (Sakit Dadaku)"	Tenxi, Jemsii & Naykilla	
12 April	"You'll Be in My Heart"	Niki	
19 April	"You'll Be in My Heart"	Niki	
26 April	"You'll Be in My Heart"	Niki	
3 May	"You'll Be in My Heart"	Niki	
10 May	"You'll Be in My Heart"	Niki	
17 May	"Mangu"	Fourtwnty featuring Charita Utami	
24 May	"Mangu"	Fourtwnty featuring Charita Utami	
31 May	"Mangu"	Fourtwnty featuring Charita Utami	
7 June	"Mangu"	Fourtwnty featuring Charita Utami	
14 June	"Mangu"	Fourtwnty featuring Charita Utami	
21 June	"Mangu"	Fourtwnty featuring Charita Utami	
28 June	"Mangu"	Fourtwnty featuring Charita Utami	
5 July	"Mangu"	Fourtwnty featuring Charita Utami	
12 July	"Mangu"	Fourtwnty featuring Charita Utami	
19 July	"Mangu"	Fourtwnty featuring Charita Utami	
26 July	"Mangu"	Fourtwnty featuring Charita Utami	
2 August	"Terbuang Dalam Waktu"	Barasuara	
9 August	"Terbuang Dalam Waktu"	Barasuara	
16 August	"Terbuang Dalam Waktu"	Barasuara	
23 August	"Tabola Bale"	Silet Open Up, Jacson Seran, Juan Reza, & Diva Aurel	
30 August	"Tabola Bale"	Silet Open Up, Jacson Seran, Juan Reza, & Diva Aurel	
6 September	"Tabola Bale"	Silet Open Up, Jacson Seran, Juan Reza, & Diva Aurel	
13 September	"Tabola Bale"	Silet Open Up, Jacson Seran, Juan Reza, & Diva Aurel	
20 September	"Tabola Bale"	Silet Open Up, Jacson Seran, Juan Reza, & Diva Aurel	
27 September	"Tabola Bale"	Silet Open Up, Jacson Seran, Juan Reza, & Diva Aurel	
4 October	"Tabola Bale"	Silet Open Up, Jacson Seran, Juan Reza, & Diva Aurel	
11 October	"Tabola Bale"	Silet Open Up, Jacson Seran, Juan Reza, & Diva Aurel	
18 October	"Alamak"	Rizky Febian & Adrian Khalif	
25 October	"Alamak"	Rizky Febian & Adrian Khalif	
1 November	"Tabola Bale"	Silet Open Up, Jacson Seran, Juan Reza, & Diva Aurel	
8 November	"Tabola Bale"	Silet Open Up, Jacson Seran, Juan Reza, & Diva Aurel	
15 November	"Tabola Bale"	Silet Open Up, Jacson Seran, Juan Reza, & Diva Aurel	
22 November	"Tabola Bale"	Silet Open Up, Jacson Seran, Juan Reza, & Diva Aurel	
29 November	"Tabola Bale"	Silet Open Up, Jacson Seran, Juan Reza, & Diva Aurel	
6 December	"Tabola Bale"	Silet Open Up, Jacson Seran, Juan Reza, & Diva Aurel	
13 December	"Tabola Bale"	Silet Open Up, Jacson Seran, Juan Reza, & Diva Aurel	
20 December	"Sedia Aku Sebelum Hujan"	Idgitaf	
27 December	"Sedia Aku Sebelum Hujan"	Idgitaf	

=== Number-one artists ===
List of number-one artists, with total weeks spent at number one shown
Position	Artist	Weeks at No. 1
1	Diva Aurel	15
1	Jacson Seran	15
1	Juan Reza	15
1	Silet Open Up	15
2	Charita Utami	11
2	Fourtwnty	11
3	Jemsii	10
3	Naykilla	10
3	Tenxi	10
4	Niki	5
5	Barasuara	3
5	Yung Kai	3
6	Adrian Khalif	2
6	Idgitaf	2
6	Rizky Febian	2
7	MikkyZia	1

== The Official Indonesia Chart ==
The Official Indonesia Chart ranks the best-performing singles in Indonesia. Its data, published by Asosiasi Industri Rekaman Indonesia (ASIRI), is based collectively on the weekly streams and digital and physical sales of singles. Previously called ASIRI Top Chart, the chart was renamed in mid-January and joined the Official Southeast Asia Charts.

=== Chart history ===
List of number-one singles
Issue date	Song	Artist(s)	Ref.
3 January	"Blue"	Yung Kai	
10 January	"Blue"	Yung Kai	
17 January	"Blue"	Yung Kai	
Chart reform after joined the Official Southeast Asia Charts.
16 January	"Garam & Madu (Sakit Dadaku)"	Tenxi, Jemsii, & Naykilla	
23 January	"Garam & Madu (Sakit Dadaku)"	Tenxi, Jemsii, & Naykilla	
30 January	"Garam & Madu (Sakit Dadaku)"	Tenxi, Jemsii, & Naykilla	
6 February	"Garam & Madu (Sakit Dadaku)"	Tenxi, Jemsii, & Naykilla	
13 February	"Garam & Madu (Sakit Dadaku)"	Tenxi, Jemsii, & Naykilla	
20 February	"Garam & Madu (Sakit Dadaku)"	Tenxi, Jemsii, & Naykilla	
27 February	"Garam & Madu (Sakit Dadaku)"	Tenxi, Jemsii, & Naykilla	
6 March	"Garam & Madu (Sakit Dadaku)"	Tenxi, Jemsii, & Naykilla	
13 March	"Garam & Madu (Sakit Dadaku)"	Tenxi, Jemsii, & Naykilla	
20 March	"Garam & Madu (Sakit Dadaku)"	Tenxi, Jemsii, & Naykilla	
27 March	"Garam & Madu (Sakit Dadaku)"	Tenxi, Jemsii, & Naykilla	
3 April	"Garam & Madu (Sakit Dadaku)"	Tenxi, Jemsii, & Naykilla	
10 April	"You'll Be in My Heart"	Niki	
17 April	"You'll Be in My Heart"	Niki	
24 April	"You'll Be in My Heart"	Niki	
1 May	"Mangu"	Fourtwnty featuring Charita Utami	
8 May	"Mangu"	Fourtwnty featuring Charita Utami	
15 May	"Mangu"	Fourtwnty featuring Charita Utami	
22 May	"Mangu"	Fourtwnty featuring Charita Utami	
29 May	"Mangu"	Fourtwnty featuring Charita Utami	
5 June	"Mangu"	Fourtwnty featuring Charita Utami	
12 June	"Mangu"	Fourtwnty featuring Charita Utami	
19 June	"Mangu"	Fourtwnty featuring Charita Utami	
26 June	"Mangu"	Fourtwnty featuring Charita Utami	
3 July	"Mangu"	Fourtwnty featuring Charita Utami	
10 July	"Mangu"	Fourtwnty featuring Charita Utami	
17 July	"Mangu"	Fourtwnty featuring Charita Utami	
24 July	"Mangu"	Fourtwnty featuring Charita Utami	
31 July	"Tabola Bale"	Silet Open Up, Jacson Seran, Juan Reza, & Diva Aurel	
7 August	"Tabola Bale"	Silet Open Up, Jacson Seran, Juan Reza, & Diva Aurel	
14 August	"Tabola Bale"	Silet Open Up, Jacson Seran, Juan Reza, & Diva Aurel	
21 August	"Tabola Bale"	Silet Open Up, Jacson Seran, Juan Reza, & Diva Aurel	
28 August	"Tabola Bale"	Silet Open Up, Jacson Seran, Juan Reza, & Diva Aurel	
4 September	"Tabola Bale"	Silet Open Up, Jacson Seran, Juan Reza, & Diva Aurel	
11 September	"Tabola Bale"	Silet Open Up, Jacson Seran, Juan Reza, & Diva Aurel	
18 September	"Tabola Bale"	Silet Open Up, Jacson Seran, Juan Reza, & Diva Aurel	
25 September	"Tabola Bale"	Silet Open Up, Jacson Seran, Juan Reza, & Diva Aurel	
2 October	"Tabola Bale"	Silet Open Up, Jacson Seran, Juan Reza, & Diva Aurel	
9 October	"Tabola Bale"	Silet Open Up, Jacson Seran, Juan Reza, & Diva Aurel	
16 October	"Tabola Bale"	Silet Open Up, Jacson Seran, Juan Reza, & Diva Aurel	
23 October	"Tabola Bale"	Silet Open Up, Jacson Seran, Juan Reza, & Diva Aurel	
30 October	"Tabola Bale"	Silet Open Up, Jacson Seran, Juan Reza, & Diva Aurel	
6 November	"Tabola Bale"	Silet Open Up, Jacson Seran, Juan Reza, & Diva Aurel	
13 November	"Tabola Bale"	Silet Open Up, Jacson Seran, Juan Reza, & Diva Aurel	
20 November	"Tabola Bale"	Silet Open Up, Jacson Seran, Juan Reza, & Diva Aurel	
27 November	"Tabola Bale"	Silet Open Up, Jacson Seran, Juan Reza, & Diva Aurel	
4 December	"Tabola Bale"	Silet Open Up, Jacson Seran, Juan Reza, & Diva Aurel	
11 December	"Sedia Aku Sebelum Hujan"	Idgitaf	
18 December	"Sedia Aku Sebelum Hujan"	Idgitaf	
25 December	"Sedia Aku Sebelum Hujan"	Idgitaf	

=== Number-one artists ===
List of number-one artists, with total weeks spent at number one shown
Position	Artist	Weeks at No. 1
1	Diva Aurel	19
1	Jacson Seran	19
1	Juan Reza	19
1	Silet Open Up	19
2	Charita Utami	13
2	Fourtwnty	13
3	Jemsii	12
3	Naykilla	12
3	Tenxi	12
4	Idgitaf	3
4	Niki	3
4	Yung Kai	3

== See also ==
- 2025 in music
