= List of number-one singles of 2024 (Indonesia) =

This is a list of the number-one singles of 2024 in Indonesia, highlighting singles that reached the top position on two major music charts: the ASIRI Top Chart and Billboard Indonesia Songs. These charts serve as key indicators of a song's popularity in the country, utilizing different methodologies and sources for their rankings.

== ASIRI Top Chart ==
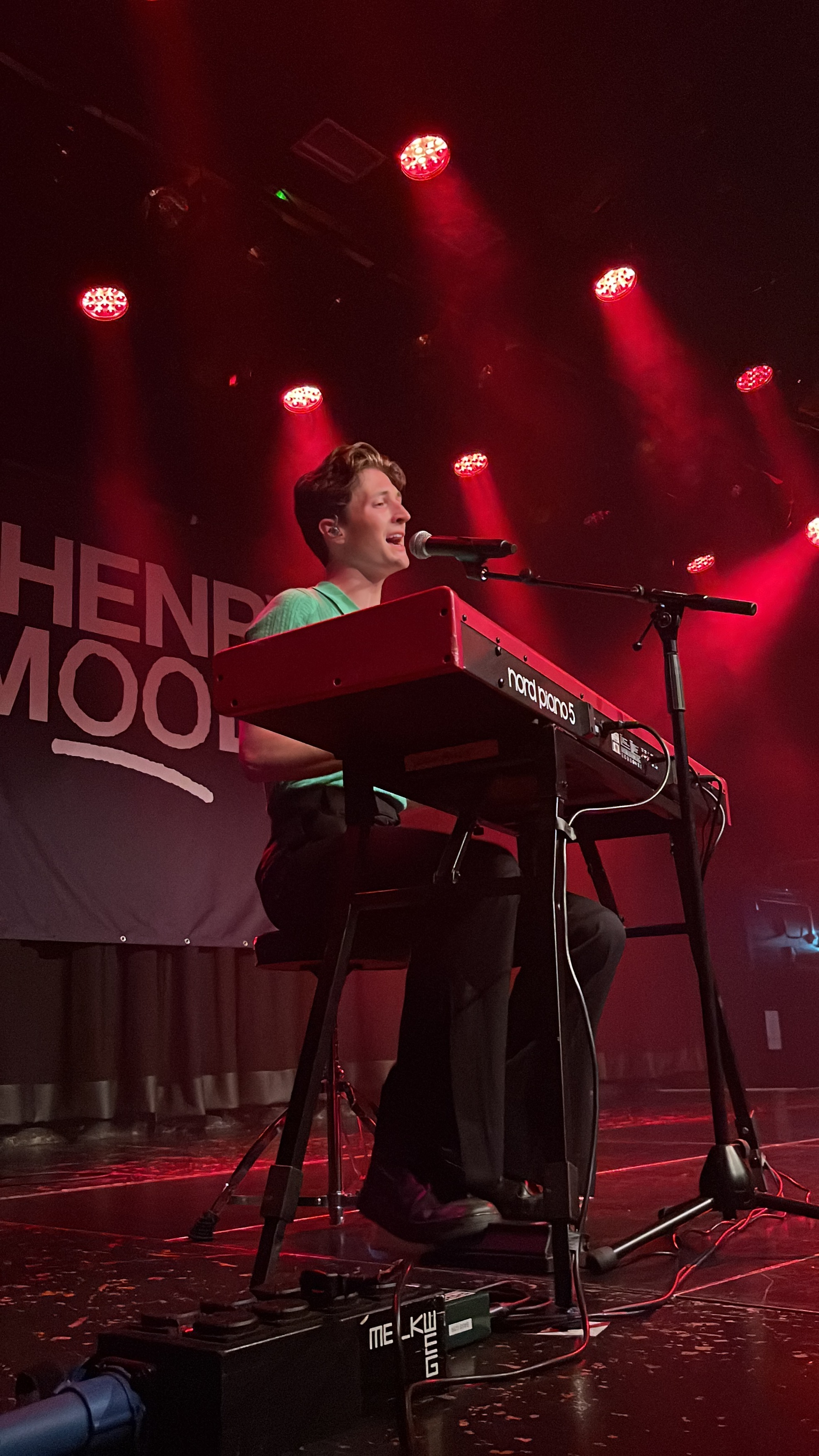
Henry Moodie's "Drunk Text" became the longest-running foreign song to hold the No. 1 spot on the ASIRI Top Chart in 2024, staying at the top for 11 weeks.

The ASIRI Top Chart ranks the best-performing singles in Indonesia. Its data, published by the Recording Industry Association of Indonesia, is based collectively on the weekly streams and digital and physical sales of singles.

Ten songs topped the charts in 2024. "Penjaga Hati" by Nadhif Basalamah and "Drunk Text" by Henry Moodie were the longest-charting number-one songs, each holding the top spot for 11 consecutive weeks. Bruno Mars was the artist with the longest week at number one in 2024, spending 15 consecutive weeks at the top of the charts.

=== Chart history ===
List of number-one singles
Issue date	Song	Artist(s)	Ref.
5 January	"Penjaga Hati"	Nadhif Basalamah	
12 January	"Penjaga Hati"	Nadhif Basalamah	
17 January	"Penjaga Hati"	Nadhif Basalamah	
24 January	"Penjaga Hati"	Nadhif Basalamah	
2 February	"Penjaga Hati"	Nadhif Basalamah	
9 February	"Penjaga Hati"	Nadhif Basalamah	
16 February	"Penjaga Hati"	Nadhif Basalamah	
23 February	"Penjaga Hati"	Nadhif Basalamah	
1 March	"Penjaga Hati"	Nadhif Basalamah	
8 March	"Penjaga Hati"	Nadhif Basalamah	
15 March	"Penjaga Hati"	Nadhif Basalamah	
22 March	"End of Beginning"	Djo	
29 March	"We Can't Be Friends (Wait for Your Love)"	Ariana Grande	
5 April	"We Can't Be Friends (Wait for Your Love)"	Ariana Grande	
12 April	"We Can't Be Friends (Wait for Your Love)"	Ariana Grande	
19 April	"Drunk Text"	Henry Moodie	
26 April	"Drunk Text"	Henry Moodie	
3 May	"Drunk Text"	Henry Moodie	
10 May	"Drunk Text"	Henry Moodie	
17 May	"Drunk Text"	Henry Moodie	
24 May	"Drunk Text"	Henry Moodie	
31 May	"Drunk Text"	Henry Moodie	
7 June	"Drunk Text"	Henry Moodie	
14 June	"Drunk Text"	Henry Moodie	
21 June	"Drunk Text"	Henry Moodie	
28 June	"Drunk Text"	Henry Moodie	
5 July	"Sialan"	Adrian Khalif & Juicy Luicy	
12 July	"Sialan"	Adrian Khalif & Juicy Luicy	
19 July	"Sialan"	Adrian Khalif & Juicy Luicy	
26 July	"Sialan"	Adrian Khalif & Juicy Luicy	
2 August	"Sialan"	Adrian Khalif & Juicy Luicy	
9 August	"Sialan"	Adrian Khalif & Juicy Luicy	
16 August	"Sialan"	Adrian Khalif & Juicy Luicy	
23 August	"Gala Bunga Matahari"	Sal Priadi	
30 August	"Gala Bunga Matahari"	Sal Priadi	
6 September	"Satu Bulan"	Bernadya	
13 September	"Die with a Smile"	Lady Gaga & Bruno Mars	
20 September	"Die with a Smile"	Lady Gaga & Bruno Mars	
27 September	"Die with a Smile"	Lady Gaga & Bruno Mars	
4 October	"Die with a Smile"	Lady Gaga & Bruno Mars	
11 October	"Die with a Smile"	Lady Gaga & Bruno Mars	
18 October	"Die with a Smile"	Lady Gaga & Bruno Mars	
25 October	"Die with a Smile"	Lady Gaga & Bruno Mars	
1 November	"APT."	Rosé & Bruno Mars	
8 November	"APT."	Rosé & Bruno Mars	
15 November	"APT."	Rosé & Bruno Mars	
22 November	"APT."	Rosé & Bruno Mars	
29 November	"APT."	Rosé & Bruno Mars	
6 December	"APT."	Rosé & Bruno Mars	
13 December	"APT."	Rosé & Bruno Mars	
20 December	"APT."	Rosé & Bruno Mars	
27 December	"Blue"	Yung Kai	

=== Number-one artists ===
List of number-one artists, with total weeks spent at number one shown
Position	Artist	Weeks at No. 1
1	Bruno Mars	15
2	Henry Moodie	11
2	Nadhif Basalamah	11
3	Rosé	8
4	Adrian Khalif	7
4	Juicy Luicy	7
4	Lady Gaga	7
5	Ariana Grande	3
6	Sal Priadi	2
7	Bernadya	1
7	Djo	1
7	Yung Kai	1

== Billboard Indonesia Songs ==
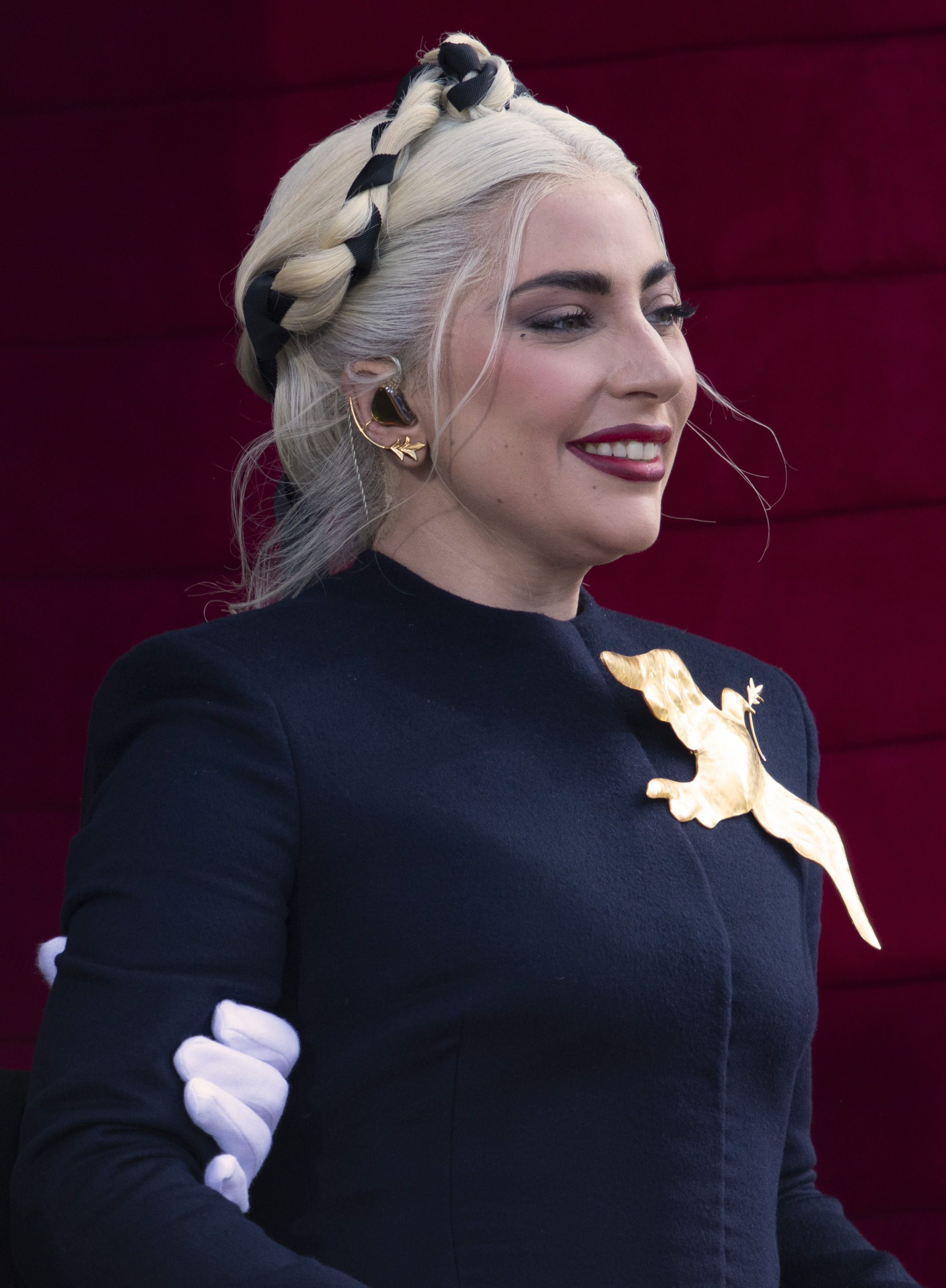
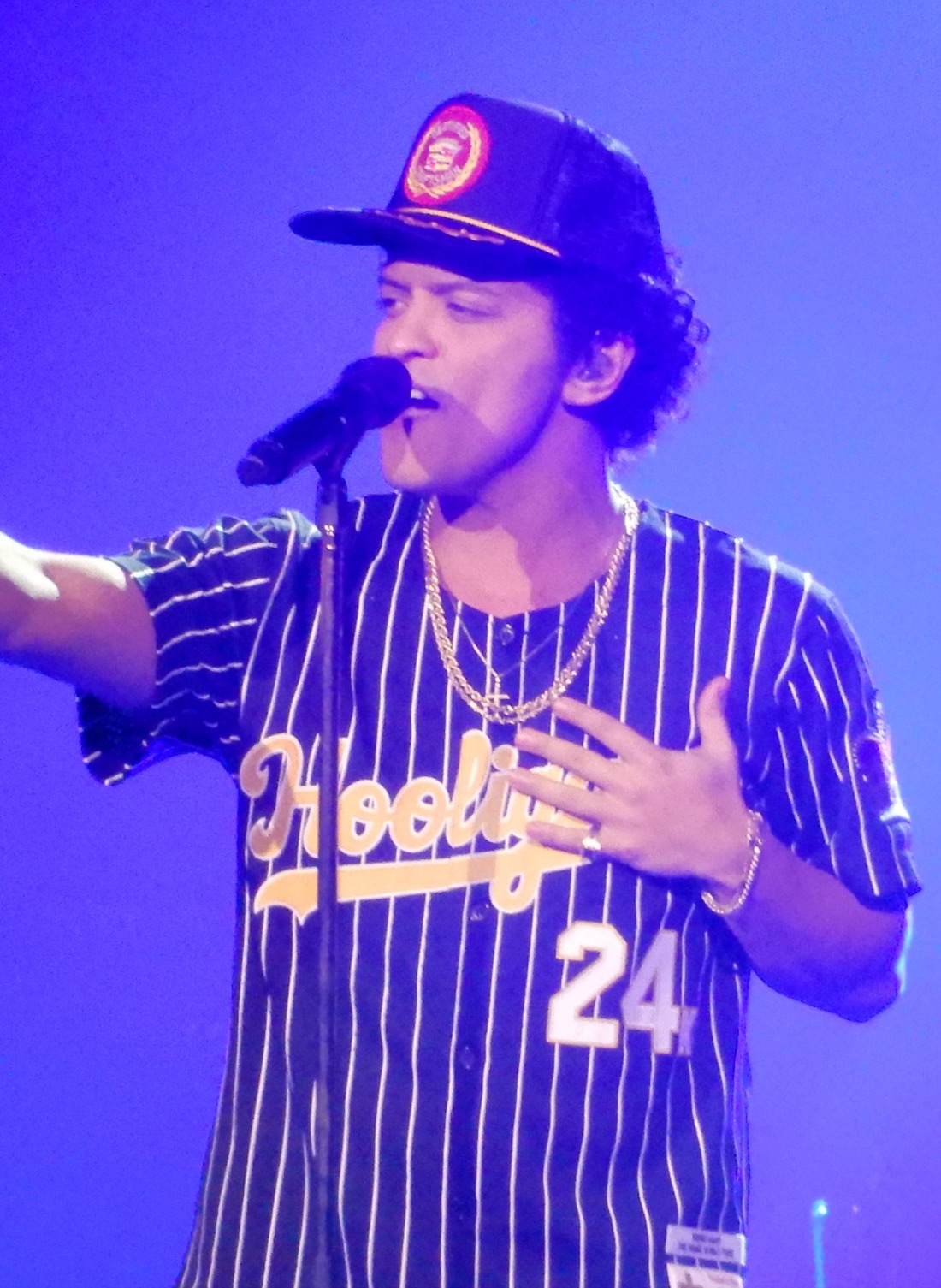
Lady Gaga and Bruno Mars topped the Billboard Indonesia Songs chart for 9 weeks with the song "Die with a Smile," achieving the longest run of any song in 2024. Mars also achieved back-to-back No. 1 hits along with "APT.", spending 15 consecutive weeks at the top with the two songs.

Indonesia Songs is a record chart in Indonesia for songs, compiled by Billboard since February 2022. The chart is updated every Tuesday on Billboard's website. The chart ranks the top 25 songs weekly in Indonesia. The data for the chart are provided by MRC Data based on weekly digital downloads and online streaming.

=== Chart history ===
List of number-one singles
Issue date	Song	Artist(s)	Ref.
6 January	"Penjaga Hati"	Nadhif Basalamah	
13 January	"Penjaga Hati"	Nadhif Basalamah	
20 January	"Bunga Hati"	Salma Salsabil	
27 January	"Bunga Hati"	Salma Salsabil	
3 February	"Bunga Hati"	Salma Salsabil	
10 February	"Penjaga Hati"	Nadhif Basalamah	
17 February	"Penjaga Hati"	Nadhif Basalamah	
24 February	"Penjaga Hati"	Nadhif Basalamah	
2 March	"Penjaga Hati"	Nadhif Basalamah	
9 March	"Penjaga Hati"	Nadhif Basalamah	
16 March	"End of Beginning"	Djo	
23 March	"End of Beginning"	Djo	
30 March	"We Can't Be Friends (Wait for Your Love)"	Ariana Grande	
6 April	"We Can't Be Friends (Wait for Your Love)"	Ariana Grande	
13 April	"We Can't Be Friends (Wait for Your Love)"	Ariana Grande	
20 April	"We Can't Be Friends (Wait for Your Love)"	Ariana Grande	
27 April	"We Can't Be Friends (Wait for Your Love)"	Ariana Grande	
4 May	"We Can't Be Friends (Wait for Your Love)"	Ariana Grande	
11 May	"Drunk Text"	Henry Moodie	
18 May	"Drunk Text"	Henry Moodie	
25 May	"Drunk Text"	Henry Moodie	
1 June	"Drunk Text"	Henry Moodie	
8 June	"Drunk Text"	Henry Moodie	
15 June	"Drunk Text"	Henry Moodie	
22 June	"Drunk Text"	Henry Moodie	
29 June	"Sialan"	Adrian Khalif & Juicy Luicy	
6 July	"Sialan"	Adrian Khalif & Juicy Luicy	
13 July	"Sialan"	Adrian Khalif & Juicy Luicy	
20 July	"Sialan"	Adrian Khalif & Juicy Luicy	
27 July	"Sialan"	Adrian Khalif & Juicy Luicy	
3 August	"Sialan"	Adrian Khalif & Juicy Luicy	
10 August	"Sialan"	Adrian Khalif & Juicy Luicy	
17 August	"Sialan"	Adrian Khalif & Juicy Luicy	
24 August	"Gala Bunga Matahari"	Sal Priadi	
31 August	"Gala Bunga Matahari"	Sal Priadi	
7 September	"Satu Bulan"	Bernadya	
14 September	"Die with a Smile"	Lady Gaga & Bruno Mars	
21 September	"Die with a Smile"	Lady Gaga & Bruno Mars	
28 September	"Die with a Smile"	Lady Gaga & Bruno Mars	
5 October	"Die with a Smile"	Lady Gaga & Bruno Mars	
12 October	"Die with a Smile"	Lady Gaga & Bruno Mars	
19 October	"Die with a Smile"	Lady Gaga & Bruno Mars	
26 October	"Die with a Smile"	Lady Gaga & Bruno Mars	
2 November	"APT."	Rosé & Bruno Mars	
9 November	"APT."	Rosé & Bruno Mars	
16 November	"APT."	Rosé & Bruno Mars	
23 November	"APT."	Rosé & Bruno Mars	
30 November	"APT."	Rosé & Bruno Mars	
7 December	"APT."	Rosé & Bruno Mars	
14 December	"Die with a Smile"	Lady Gaga & Bruno Mars	
21 December	"Die with a Smile"	Lady Gaga & Bruno Mars	
28 December	"Blue"	Yung Kai	

=== Number-one artists ===
List of number-one artists, with total weeks spent at number one shown
Position	Artist	Weeks at No. 1
1	Bruno Mars	15
2	Lady Gaga	9
3	Adrian Khalif	8
3	Juicy Luicy	8
4	Henry Moodie	7
4	Nadhif Basalamah	7
5	Ariana Grande	6
5	Rosé	6
6	Salma Salsabil	3
7	Djo	2
7	Sal Priadi	2
8	Bernadya	1
8	Yung Kai	1

== See also ==
- 2024 in music
