= List of number-one songs of 2025 (Malaysia) =

This is a list of the number-one singles of 2025 in Malaysia, highlighting singles that reached the top position on Malaysian major music charts. These charts serve as key indicators of a song's popularity in the country, utilizing different methodologies and sources for their rankings.

== RIM streaming charts ==
Issue Date	International songs			Malay songs			Chinese songs		
Issue Date	Song	Artist(s)	Ref.	Song	Artist(s)	Ref.	Song	Artist(s)	Ref.
2 January	"APT."	Rosé and Bruno Mars		"Masing Masing"	Ernie Zakri and Ade Govinda		"在加納共和國離婚"	Dior大穎 and Firdhaus	
9 January	"Die with a Smile"	Lady Gaga and Bruno Mars		"Masing Masing"	Ernie Zakri and Ade Govinda		"在加納共和國離婚"	Dior大穎 and Firdhaus	

Note: On 23 January 2025, RIM Streaming charts was rebranded to the Official Malaysia Chart and joined the Official Southeast Asia Charts launched by the IFPI in collaboration with RIM. The Malay and Chinese songs charts were also rebranded to the Official Malaysia Domestic Chart and the Official Malaysia Chinese Chart.

== IFPI Official Southeast Asia Charts ==
Issue Date	The Official Malaysia Chart		The Official Malaysia Domestic Chart		The Official Malaysia Chinese Chart	
Issue Date	Song	Artist(s)	Song	Artist(s)	Song	Artist(s)
16 January	"Die with a Smile"	Lady Gaga and Bruno Mars	"Rahsia Tuhan"	Noh Salleh	"南北大道"	3P
23 January	"Garam & Madu (Sakit Dadaku)"	Tenxi, Jemsii and Naykilla	"Rahsia Tuhan"	Noh Salleh	"南北大道"	3P
30 January	"Garam & Madu (Sakit Dadaku)"	Tenxi, Jemsii and Naykilla	"Rahsia Tuhan"	Noh Salleh	"YES蛇"	3P, 薛家燕 and Jaspers Lai
6 February	"Garam & Madu (Sakit Dadaku)"	Tenxi, Jemsii and Naykilla	"Menjaga Jodoh Orang Lain"	Ara Johari	"南北大道"	3P
13 February	"Garam & Madu (Sakit Dadaku)"	Tenxi, Jemsii and Naykilla	"Menjaga Jodoh Orang Lain"	Ara Johari	"跳楼机 Jumping Machine"	LBI利比
20 February	"跳楼机 Jumping Machine"	LBI利比	"Bukan Lagi Kita"	Nadeera	"跳楼机 Jumping Machine"	LBI利比
27 February	"跳楼机 Jumping Machine"	LBI利比	"Bukan Lagi Kita"	Nadeera	"跳楼机 Jumping Machine"	LBI利比
6 March	"跳楼机 Jumping Machine"	LBI利比	"Bukan Lagi Kita"	Nadeera	"跳楼机 Jumping Machine"	LBI利比
13 March	"Like Jennie"	Jennie	"Bukan Lagi Kita"	Nadeera	"跳楼机 Jumping Machine"	LBI利比
20 March	"Like Jennie"	Jennie	"Meriah Lain Macam"	Hael Husaini and Nadeera	"跳楼机 Jumping Machine"	LBI利比
27 March	"Like Jennie"	Jennie	"Meriah Lain Macam"	Hael Husaini and Nadeera	"跳楼机 Jumping Machine"	LBI利比
3 April	"Meriah Lain Macam"	Hael Husaini and Nadeera	"Meriah Lain Macam"	Hael Husaini and Nadeera	"跳楼机 Jumping Machine"	LBI利比
10 April	"Meriah Lain Macam"	Hael Husaini and Nadeera	"Meriah Lain Macam"	Hael Husaini and Nadeera	"跳楼机 Jumping Machine"	LBI利比
17 April	"Like Jennie"	Jennie	–		"跳楼机 Jumping Machine"	LBI利比
24 April	"Like Jennie"	Jennie	"Meriah Lain Macam"	Hael Husaini and Nadeera	"跳楼机 Jumping Machine"	LBI利比
1 May	"Like Jennie"	Jennie	"Meriah Lain Macam"	Hael Husaini and Nadeera	"跳楼机 Jumping Machine"	LBI利比
8 May	"Like Jennie"	Jennie	"Bukan Lagi Kita"	Nadeera	"跳楼机 Jumping Machine"	LBI利比
15 May	"Mangu"	Fourtwnty featuring Charita Utami	"Bukan Lagi Kita"	Nadeera	"跳楼机 Jumping Machine"	LBI利比
22 May	"Mangu"	Fourtwnty featuring Charita Utami	"Bukan Lagi Kita"	Nadeera	"跳楼机 Jumping Machine"	LBI利比
29 May	"Mangu"	Fourtwnty featuring Charita Utami	"Tia Monika"	Dek Aroel	"跳楼机 Jumping Machine"	LBI利比
5 June	"Mangu"	Fourtwnty featuring Charita Utami	"Tia Monika"	Dek Aroel	"跳楼机 Jumping Machine"	LBI利比
12 June	"Mangu"	Fourtwnty featuring Charita Utami	"Tia Monika"	Dek Aroel	"跳楼机 Jumping Machine"	LBI利比
19 June	"Mangu"	Fourtwnty featuring Charita Utami	"Seni Berdamai Dengan Takdir"	Naim Daniel and Adnin Roslan	"跳楼机 Jumping Machine"	LBI利比
26 June	"Mangu"	Fourtwnty featuring Charita Utami	"Seni Berdamai Dengan Takdir"	Naim Daniel and Adnin Roslan	"跳楼机 Jumping Machine"	LBI利比
3 July	"Mangu"	Fourtwnty featuring Charita Utami	"Seni Berdamai Dengan Takdir"	Naim Daniel and Adnin Roslan	"跳楼机 Jumping Machine"	LBI利比
10 July	"Golden"	Huntrix: Ejae, Audrey Nuna, and Rei Ami	"Seni Berdamai Dengan Takdir"	Naim Daniel and Adnin Roslan	"跳楼机 Jumping Machine"	LBI利比
17 July	"Jump"	Blackpink	"Seni Berdamai Dengan Takdir"	Naim Daniel and Adnin Roslan	"跳楼机 Jumping Machine"	LBI利比
24 July	"Golden"	Huntrix: Ejae, Audrey Nuna, and Rei Ami	"Seni Berdamai Dengan Takdir"	Naim Daniel and Adnin Roslan	"跳楼机 Jumping Machine"	LBI利比
31 July	"Golden"	Huntrix: Ejae, Audrey Nuna, and Rei Ami	"Seni Berdamai Dengan Takdir"	Naim Daniel and Adnin Roslan	"跳楼机 Jumping Machine"	LBI利比
7 August	"Golden"	Huntrix: Ejae, Audrey Nuna, and Rei Ami	"Seni Berdamai Dengan Takdir"	Naim Daniel and Adnin Roslan	"跳楼机 Jumping Machine"	LBI利比
14 August	"Golden"	Huntrix: Ejae, Audrey Nuna, and Rei Ami	"Ingat"	ALYPH	"跳楼机 Jumping Machine"	LBI利比
21 August	"Golden"	Huntrix: Ejae, Audrey Nuna, and Rei Ami	"Ingat"	ALYPH	"看着我的眼睛说"	张远
28 August	"Golden"	Huntrix: Ejae, Audrey Nuna, and Rei Ami	"Ingat"	ALYPH	"看着我的眼睛说"	张远
4 September	"Tabola Bale"	Silet Open Up, Jacson Seran, Juan Reza and Diva Aurel	"Ingat"	ALYPH	"看着我的眼睛说"	张远
11 September	"Tabola Bale"	Silet Open Up, Jacson Seran, Juan Reza and Diva Aurel	"Ingat"	ALYPH	"跳楼机 Jumping Machine"	LBI利比
18 September	"Tabola Bale"	Silet Open Up, Jacson Seran, Juan Reza and Diva Aurel	"Ingat"	ALYPH	"跳楼机 Jumping Machine"	LBI利比
25 September	"Tabola Bale"	Silet Open Up, Jacson Seran, Juan Reza and Diva Aurel	"Ingat"	ALYPH	"跳楼机 Jumping Machine"	LBI利比
2 October	"Tabola Bale"	Silet Open Up, Jacson Seran, Juan Reza and Diva Aurel	"P Ramlee Saloma"	Alpha	"跳楼机 Jumping Machine"	LBI利比
9 October	"Tabola Bale"	Silet Open Up, Jacson Seran, Juan Reza and Diva Aurel	"P Ramlee Saloma"	Alpha	"跳楼机 Jumping Machine"	LBI利比
16 October	"Golden"	Huntrix: Ejae, Audrey Nuna, and Rei Ami	"P Ramlee Saloma"	Alpha	"跳楼机 Jumping Machine"	LBI利比
23 October	"Tabola Bale"	Silet Open Up, Jacson Seran, Juan Reza and Diva Aurel	"P Ramlee Saloma"	Alpha	"跳楼机 Jumping Machine"	LBI利比
30 October	"Tabola Bale"	Silet Open Up, Jacson Seran, Juan Reza and Diva Aurel	"P Ramlee Saloma"	Alpha	"跳楼机 Jumping Machine"	LBI利比
6 November	"Tabola Bale"	Silet Open Up, Jacson Seran, Juan Reza and Diva Aurel	"P Ramlee Saloma"	Alpha	"跟悲傷結了帳"	Gareth.T and 攬佬SKAI ISYOURGOD
13 November	"Tabola Bale"	Silet Open Up, Jacson Seran, Juan Reza and Diva Aurel	"P Ramlee Saloma"	Alpha	"跟悲傷結了帳"	Gareth.T and 攬佬SKAI ISYOURGOD
20 November	"Tabola Bale"	Silet Open Up, Jacson Seran, Juan Reza and Diva Aurel	"Tabola Bale"	Silet Open Up, Jacson Seran, Juan Reza and Diva Aurel	"跟悲傷結了帳"	Gareth.T and 攬佬SKAI ISYOURGOD
27 November	"Tabola Bale"	Silet Open Up, Jacson Seran, Juan Reza and Diva Aurel	"P Ramlee Saloma"	Alpha	"跟悲傷結了帳"	Gareth.T and 攬佬SKAI ISYOURGOD
4 December	"Tabola Bale"	Silet Open Up, Jacson Seran, Juan Reza and Diva Aurel	"P Ramlee Saloma"	Alpha	"跳楼机 Jumping Machine"	LBI利比
11 December	"Tabola Bale"	Silet Open Up, Jacson Seran, Juan Reza and Diva Aurel	"P Ramlee Saloma"	Alpha	"跳楼机 Jumping Machine"	LBI利比
18 December	"Tabola Bale"	Silet Open Up, Jacson Seran, Juan Reza and Diva Aurel	"P Ramlee Saloma"	Alpha	"跳楼机 Jumping Machine"	LBI利比
25 December	"Tabola Bale"	Silet Open Up, Jacson Seran, Juan Reza and Diva Aurel	"P Ramlee Saloma"	Alpha	"跳楼机 Jumping Machine"	LBI利比

== Billboard Malaysia Songs ==
Issue date	Song	Artist(s)	Ref.
4 January	"APT."	Rosé and Bruno Mars	
11 January	"Die with a Smile"	Lady Gaga and Bruno Mars	
18 January	"Die with a Smile"	Lady Gaga and Bruno Mars	
25 January	"Die with a Smile"	Lady Gaga and Bruno Mars	
1 February	"Die with a Smile"	Lady Gaga and Bruno Mars	
8 February	"Die with a Smile"	Lady Gaga and Bruno Mars	
15 February	"Die with a Smile"	Lady Gaga and Bruno Mars	
22 February	"Die with a Smile"	Lady Gaga and Bruno Mars	
1 March	"跳楼机 Drop Towers"	LBI利比	
8 March	"跳楼机 Drop Towers"	LBI利比	
15 March	"跳楼机 Drop Towers"	LBI利比	
22 March	"Like Jennie"	Jennie	
29 March	"Like Jennie"	Jennie	
5 April	"Like Jennie"	Jennie	
12 April	"Meriah Lain Macam"	(Malaysia) Hael Husaini and Nadeera	
19 April	"Like Jennie"	Jennie	
26 April	"Like Jennie"	Jennie	
3 May	"Like Jennie"	Jennie	
10 May	"Like Jennie"	Jennie	
17 May	"Like Jennie"	Jennie	
24 May	"Mangu"	Fourtwnty featuring Charita Utami	
31 May	"Mangu"	Fourtwnty featuring Charita Utami	
7 June	"Mangu"	Fourtwnty featuring Charita Utami	
14 June	"Mangu"	Fourtwnty featuring Charita Utami	
21 June	"Mangu"	Fourtwnty featuring Charita Utami	
28 June	"Mangu"	Fourtwnty featuring Charita Utami	
5 July	"Mangu"	Fourtwnty featuring Charita Utami	
12 July	"Golden"	Huntrix: Ejae, Audrey Nuna, and Rei Ami	
19 July	"Golden"	Huntrix: Ejae, Audrey Nuna, and Rei Ami	
26 July	"Jump"	Blackpink	
2 August	"Golden"	Huntrix: Ejae, Audrey Nuna, and Rei Ami	
9 August	"Golden"	Huntrix: Ejae, Audrey Nuna, and Rei Ami	
16 August	"Golden"	Huntrix: Ejae, Audrey Nuna, and Rei Ami	
23 August	"Golden"	Huntrix: Ejae, Audrey Nuna, and Rei Ami	
30 August	"Golden"	Huntrix: Ejae, Audrey Nuna, and Rei Ami	
6 September	"Golden"	Huntrix: Ejae, Audrey Nuna, and Rei Ami	
13 September	"Golden"	Huntrix: Ejae, Audrey Nuna, and Rei Ami	
20 September	"Golden"	Huntrix: Ejae, Audrey Nuna, and Rei Ami	
27 September	"Tabola Bale"	Juan Reza, Diva Aurel, Silet Open Up and Jacson Seran	
4 October	"Golden"	Huntrix: Ejae, Audrey Nuna, and Rei Ami	
11 October	"Tabola Bale"	Juan Reza, Diva Aurel, Silet Open Up and Jacson Seran	
18 October	"Golden"	Huntrix: Ejae, Audrey Nuna, and Rei Ami	
25 October	"Golden"	Huntrix: Ejae, Audrey Nuna, and Rei Ami	
1 November	"Golden"	Huntrix: Ejae, Audrey Nuna, and Rei Ami	
8 November	"Golden"	Huntrix: Ejae, Audrey Nuna, and Rei Ami	
15 November	"Golden"	Huntrix: Ejae, Audrey Nuna, and Rei Ami	
22 November	"Tabola Bale"	Juan Reza, Diva Aurel, Silet Open Up and Jacson Seran	
29 November	"Tabola Bale"	Juan Reza, Diva Aurel, Silet Open Up and Jacson Seran	
6 December	"Tabola Bale"	Juan Reza, Diva Aurel, Silet Open Up and Jacson Seran	
13 December	"Golden"	Huntrix: Ejae, Audrey Nuna, and Rei Ami	
20 December	"Golden"	Huntrix: Ejae, Audrey Nuna, and Rei Ami	
27 December	"The Fate of Ophelia"	Taylor Swift	
