= Max Zhang =

Max Zhang may refer to:

- Yung Kai (born 2002), Chinese-Canadian musician
- Zhang Jin (born 1974), Chinese actor
- Zhang Zhaoxu (born 1987), Chinese basketball player
