= List of number-one singles of 2023 (Indonesia) =

This is a list of the number-one singles of 2023 in Indonesia, highlighting singles that reached the top position on two major music charts: the ASIRI Top Chart and Billboard Indonesia Songs. These charts serve as key indicators of a song's popularity in the country, utilizing different methodologies and sources for their rankings.

== ASIRI Top Chart ==
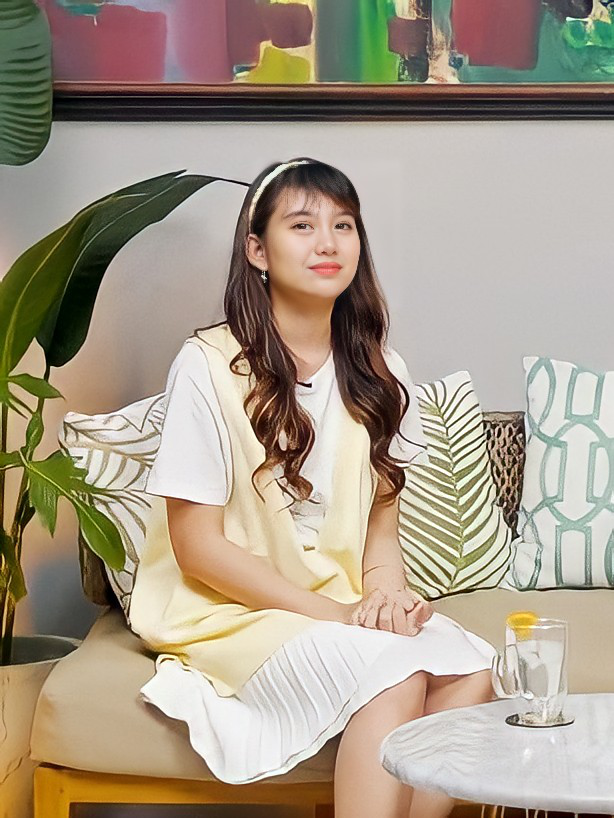
Ghea Indrawari and Nadhif Basalamah are the only artists that topped the inaugural ASIRI Top Chart in 2023.

The ASIRI Top Chart ranks the best-performing singles in Indonesia. Its data, published by the Recording Industry Association of Indonesia, is based collectively on the weekly streams and digital and physical sales of singles. The chart began publishing on 1 September 2023.

Two songs topped the charts in 2023, "Jiwa Yang Bersedih" by Ghea Indrawari, which stayed at number one for 8 consecutive weeks, and "Penjaga Hati" by Nadhif Basalamah, which held the top spot for 10 consecutive weeks.

=== Chart history ===
List of number-one singles
Issue date	Song	Artist(s)	Ref.
1 September	"Jiwa Yang Bersedih"	Ghea Indrawari	
8 September	"Jiwa Yang Bersedih"	Ghea Indrawari	
15 September	"Jiwa Yang Bersedih"	Ghea Indrawari	
22 September	"Jiwa Yang Bersedih"	Ghea Indrawari	
29 September	"Jiwa Yang Bersedih"	Ghea Indrawari	
6 October	"Jiwa Yang Bersedih"	Ghea Indrawari	
13 October	"Jiwa Yang Bersedih"	Ghea Indrawari	
20 October	"Jiwa Yang Bersedih"	Ghea Indrawari	
27 October	"Penjaga Hati"	Nadhif Basalamah	
3 November	"Penjaga Hati"	Nadhif Basalamah	
10 November	"Penjaga Hati"	Nadhif Basalamah	
17 November	"Penjaga Hati"	Nadhif Basalamah	
24 November	"Penjaga Hati"	Nadhif Basalamah	
1 December	"Penjaga Hati"	Nadhif Basalamah	
8 December	"Penjaga Hati"	Nadhif Basalamah	
15 December	"Penjaga Hati"	Nadhif Basalamah	
22 December	"Penjaga Hati"	Nadhif Basalamah	
29 December	"Penjaga Hati"	Nadhif Basalamah	

=== Number-one artists ===
List of number-one artists, with total weeks spent at number one shown
Position	Artist	Weeks at No. 1
1	Nadhif Basalamah	10
2	Ghea Indrawari	8

== Billboard Indonesia Songs ==
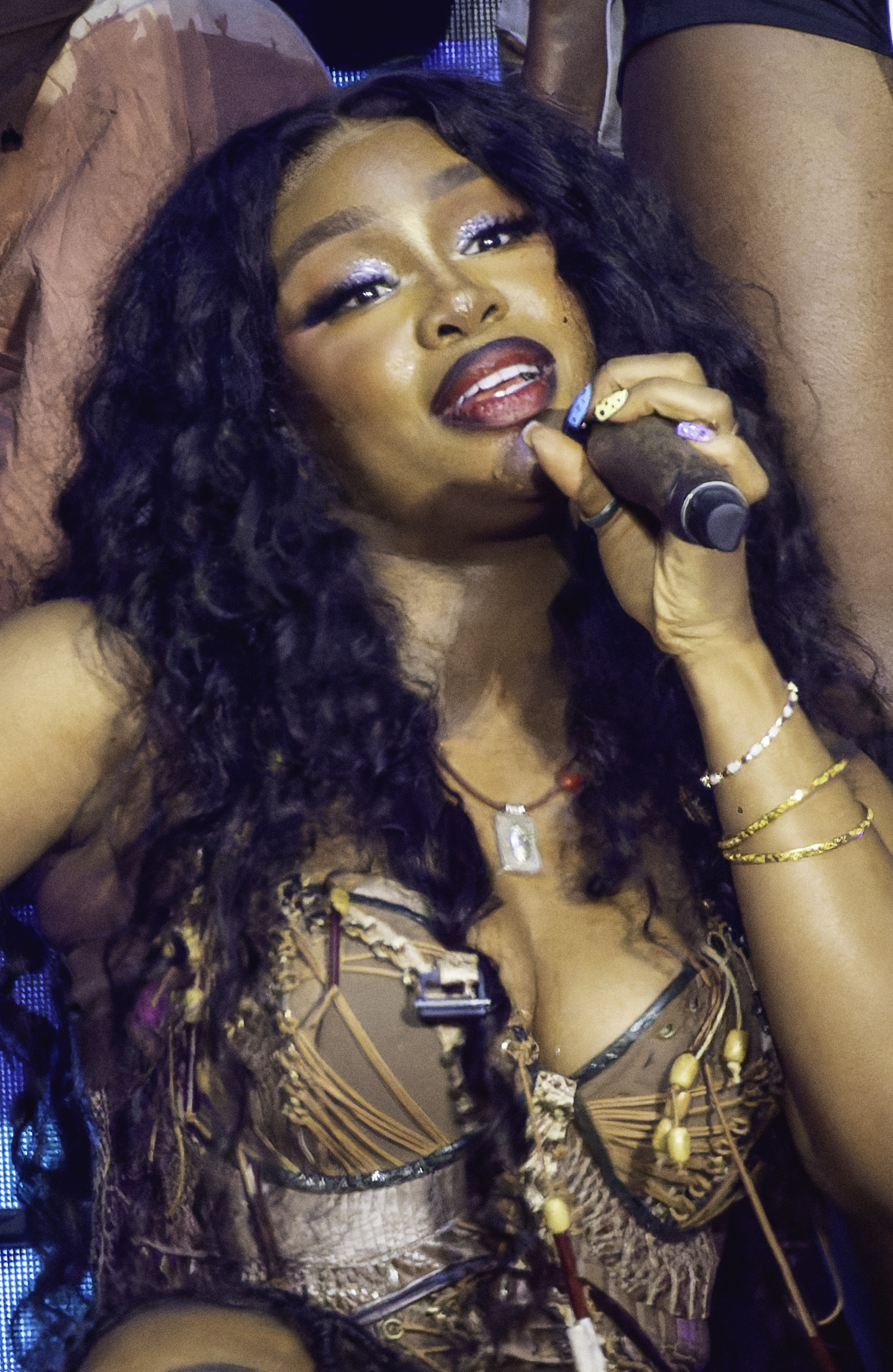
SZA's "Kill Bill" became the longest-running foreign song to hold the No. 1 spot on the Billboard Indonesia Songs chart in 2023, staying at the top for 5 weeks.

Indonesia Songs is a record chart in Indonesia for songs, compiled by Billboard since February 2022. The chart is updated every Tuesday on Billboard's website. The chart ranks the top 25 songs weekly in Indonesia. The data for the chart are provided by MRC Data based on weekly digital downloads and online streaming.

=== Chart history ===
List of number-one singles
Issue date	Song	Artist(s)	Ref.
7 January	"Kill Bill"	SZA	
14 January	"Ditto"	NewJeans	
21 January	"Kill Bill"	SZA	
28 January	"Kill Bill"	SZA	
4 February	"Kill Bill"	SZA	
11 February	"Kill Bill"	SZA	
18 February	"Sial"	Mahalini	
25 February	"Sial"	Mahalini	
4 March	"Sial"	Mahalini	
11 March	"Komang"	Raim Laode	
18 March	"Komang"	Raim Laode	
25 March	"Komang"	Raim Laode	
1 April	"Komang"	Raim Laode	
8 April	"Komang"	Raim Laode	
15 April	"Komang"	Raim Laode	
22 April	"Komang"	Raim Laode	
29 April	"Komang"	Raim Laode	
6 May	"Komang"	Raim Laode	
13 May	"Cupid"	Fifty Fifty	
20 May	"Cupid"	Fifty Fifty	
27 May	"Tak Segampang Itu"	Anggi Marito	
3 June	"Tak Segampang Itu"	Anggi Marito	
10 June	"Tak Segampang Itu"	Anggi Marito	
17 June	"Tak Segampang Itu"	Anggi Marito	
24 June	"Tak Segampang Itu"	Anggi Marito	
1 July	"Tak Segampang Itu"	Anggi Marito	
8 July	"Tak Segampang Itu"	Anggi Marito	
15 July	"Tak Segampang Itu"	Anggi Marito	
22 July	"Tak Segampang Itu"	Anggi Marito	
29 July	"Seven"	Jungkook featuring Latto	
5 August	"Seven"	Jungkook featuring Latto	
12 August	"Seven"	Jungkook featuring Latto	
19 August	"Jiwa Yang Bersedih"	Ghea Indrawari	
26 August	"Jiwa Yang Bersedih"	Ghea Indrawari	
2 September	"Jiwa Yang Bersedih"	Ghea Indrawari	
9 September	"Jiwa Yang Bersedih"	Ghea Indrawari	
16 September	"Jiwa Yang Bersedih"	Ghea Indrawari	
23 September	"Jiwa Yang Bersedih"	Ghea Indrawari	
30 September	"Jiwa Yang Bersedih"	Ghea Indrawari	
7 October	"Jiwa Yang Bersedih"	Ghea Indrawari	
14 October	"3D"	Jungkook featuring Jack Harlow	
21 October	"Jiwa Yang Bersedih"	Ghea Indrawari	
28 October	"Penjaga Hati"	Nadhif Basalamah	
4 November	"Penjaga Hati"	Nadhif Basalamah	
11 November	"Penjaga Hati"	Nadhif Basalamah	
18 November	"Penjaga Hati"	Nadhif Basalamah	
25 November	"Penjaga Hati"	Nadhif Basalamah	
2 December	"Penjaga Hati"	Nadhif Basalamah	
9 December	"Penjaga Hati"	Nadhif Basalamah	
16 December	"Penjaga Hati"	Nadhif Basalamah	
23 December	"Penjaga Hati"	Nadhif Basalamah	
30 December	"Penjaga Hati"	Nadhif Basalamah	

=== Number-one artists ===
List of number-one artists, with total weeks spent at number one shown
Position	Artist	Weeks at No. 1
1	Nadhif Basalamah	10
2	Anggi Marito	9
2	Ghea Indrawari	9
2	Raim Laode	9
3	SZA	5
4	Jungkook	4
5	Mahalini	3
6	Fifty Fifty	2
7	Jack Harlow	1
7	Latto	1
7	NewJeans	1

== See also ==
- 2023 in music
