= List of number-one singles of 2026 (Indonesia) =

This is a list of the number-one singles of 2026 in Indonesia, highlighting singles that reached the top position on two major music charts: Billboard Indonesia Songs and the Official Indonesia Chart. These charts serve as key indicators of a song's popularity in the country, utilizing different methodologies and sources for their rankings.

== Billboard Indonesia Songs ==
Indonesia Songs is a record chart in Indonesia for songs, compiled by Billboard since February 2022. The chart is updated every Tuesday on Billboard's website. The chart ranks the top 25 songs weekly in Indonesia. The data for the chart are provided by Luminate based on weekly digital downloads and online streaming.

=== Chart history ===
List of number-one singles
Issue date	Song	Artist(s)	Ref.
3 January	"Sedia Aku Sebelum Hujan"	Idgitaf	
10 January	"Sedia Aku Sebelum Hujan"	Idgitaf	
17 January	"Sedia Aku Sebelum Hujan"	Idgitaf	
24 January	"Sedia Aku Sebelum Hujan"	Idgitaf	
31 January	"Kota Ini Tak Sama Tanpamu"	Nadhif Basalamah	
7 February	"Kota Ini Tak Sama Tanpamu"	Nadhif Basalamah	
14 February	"Kota Ini Tak Sama Tanpamu"	Nadhif Basalamah	
21 February	"Kota Ini Tak Sama Tanpamu"	Nadhif Basalamah	
28 February	"Kota Ini Tak Sama Tanpamu"	Nadhif Basalamah	
7 March	"Kota Ini Tak Sama Tanpamu"	Nadhif Basalamah	
14 March	"Kota Ini Tak Sama Tanpamu"	Nadhif Basalamah	
21 March	"Kota Ini Tak Sama Tanpamu"	Nadhif Basalamah	
28 March	"Kota Ini Tak Sama Tanpamu"	Nadhif Basalamah	
4 April	"Kota Ini Tak Sama Tanpamu"	Nadhif Basalamah	
11 April	"Kota Ini Tak Sama Tanpamu"	Nadhif Basalamah	
18 April	"Kota Ini Tak Sama Tanpamu"	Nadhif Basalamah	
25 April	"Kota Ini Tak Sama Tanpamu"	Nadhif Basalamah	
2 May	"Kota Ini Tak Sama Tanpamu"	Nadhif Basalamah	
9 May	"Kota Ini Tak Sama Tanpamu"	Nadhif Basalamah	
16 May	"Kota Ini Tak Sama Tanpamu"	Nadhif Basalamah	
23 May	"Kota Ini Tak Sama Tanpamu"	Nadhif Basalamah	
30 May	"Kota Ini Tak Sama Tanpamu"	Nadhif Basalamah	
6 June	"Kota Ini Tak Sama Tanpamu"	Nadhif Basalamah	
13 June	"Sesi Potret"	Enáu & Ari Lesmana	
20 June	"Sesi Potret"	Enáu & Ari Lesmana	
27 June	"Sesi Potret"	Enáu & Ari Lesmana	
4 July	"Sesi Potret"	Enáu & Ari Lesmana	
11 July	"Sesi Potret"	Enáu & Ari Lesmana	
18 July	"Sesi Potret"	Enáu & Ari Lesmana	
25 July	"Sesi Potret"	Enáu & Ari Lesmana	
1 August	"Sesi Potret"	Enáu & Ari Lesmana	
8 August	"Sesi Potret"	Enáu & Ari Lesmana	
15 August	"Sesi Potret"	Enáu & Ari Lesmana	
22 August	"Sesi Potret"	Enáu & Ari Lesmana	
29 August	"Sesi Potret"	Enáu & Ari Lesmana	
5 September	"Teh Hijau"	Tulus	
12 September	"Teh Hijau"	Tulus	
19 September	"Teh Hijau"	Tulus	
26 September	"Teh Hijau"	Tulus	
3 October	"Teh Hijau"	Tulus	
10 October	"Teh Hijau"	Tulus	
17 October	"Sesi Potret"	Enáu & Ari Lesmana	
24 October	"Sesi Potret"	Enáu & Ari Lesmana	
31 October	"Sesi Potret"	Enáu & Ari Lesmana	
7 November	"Sesi Potret"	Enáu & Ari Lesmana	
14 November	"Sesi Potret"	Enáu & Ari Lesmana	
21 November	"Stuck"	LANY	

=== Number-one artists ===
List of number-one artists, with total weeks spent at number one shown
Position	Artist	Weeks at No. 1
1	Nadhif Basalamah	19
2	Ari Lesmana	17
2	Enáu	17
3	Tulus	6
4	Idgitaf	4
5	LANY	1

== The Official Indonesia Chart ==
The Official Indonesia Chart ranks the best-performing singles in Indonesia. Its data, published by Asosiasi Industri Rekaman Indonesia (ASIRI), is based collectively on the weekly streams and digital and physical sales of singles. The chart is part of the Official Southeast Asia Charts powered by IFPI.

=== Chart history ===
List of number-one singles
Issue date	Song	Artist(s)	Ref.
1 January	"Sedia Aku Sebelum Hujan"	Idgitaf	
8 January	"Sedia Aku Sebelum Hujan"	Idgitaf	
15 January	"Sedia Aku Sebelum Hujan"	Idgitaf	
22 January	"Kota Ini Tak Sama Tanpamu"	Nadhif Basalamah	
29 January	"Kota Ini Tak Sama Tanpamu"	Nadhif Basalamah	
5 February	"Kota Ini Tak Sama Tanpamu"	Nadhif Basalamah	
12 February	"Kota Ini Tak Sama Tanpamu"	Nadhif Basalamah	
19 February	"Kota Ini Tak Sama Tanpamu"	Nadhif Basalamah	
26 February	"Kota Ini Tak Sama Tanpamu"	Nadhif Basalamah	
5 March	"Kota Ini Tak Sama Tanpamu"	Nadhif Basalamah	
12 March	"Kota Ini Tak Sama Tanpamu"	Nadhif Basalamah	
19 March	"Kota Ini Tak Sama Tanpamu"	Nadhif Basalamah	
26 March	"Kota Ini Tak Sama Tanpamu"	Nadhif Basalamah	
2 April	"Kota Ini Tak Sama Tanpamu"	Nadhif Basalamah	
9 April	"Kota Ini Tak Sama Tanpamu"	Nadhif Basalamah	
16 April	"Kota Ini Tak Sama Tanpamu"	Nadhif Basalamah	
23 April	"Kota Ini Tak Sama Tanpamu"	Nadhif Basalamah	
30 April	"Jangan Paksa Rindu (Beda)"	Ifan Seventeen	
7 May	"Jangan Paksa Rindu (Beda)"	Ifan Seventeen	
14 May	"Jangan Paksa Rindu (Beda)"	Ifan Seventeen	
21 May	"Jangan Paksa Rindu (Beda)"	Ifan Seventeen	
28 May	"Sesi Potret"	Enáu & Ari Lesmana	
4 June	"Sesi Potret"	Enáu & Ari Lesmana	
11 June	"Sesi Potret"	Enáu & Ari Lesmana	
18 June	"Sesi Potret"	Enáu & Ari Lesmana	
25 June	"Sesi Potret"	Enáu & Ari Lesmana	
2 July	"Sesi Potret"	Enáu & Ari Lesmana	
9 July	"Sesi Potret"	Enáu & Ari Lesmana	
16 July	"Sesi Potret"	Enáu & Ari Lesmana	
23 July	"Sesi Potret"	Enáu & Ari Lesmana	
30 July	"Sesi Potret"	Enáu & Ari Lesmana	
6 August	"Sesi Potret"	Enáu & Ari Lesmana	
13 August	"Sesi Potret"	Enáu & Ari Lesmana	
20 August	"Sesi Potret"	Enáu & Ari Lesmana	
27 August	"Teh Hijau"	Tulus	
3 September	"Teh Hijau"	Tulus	
10 September	"Teh Hijau"	Tulus	
17 September	"Teh Hijau"	Tulus	
24 September	"Teh Hijau"	Tulus	
1 October	"Teh Hijau"	Tulus	
8 October	"Teh Hijau"	Tulus	
15 October	"Teh Hijau"	Tulus	
22 October	"Teh Hijau"	Tulus	
29 October	"Teh Hijau"	Tulus	
5 November	"Teh Hijau"	Tulus	
12 November	"Stuck"	LANY	

=== Number-one artists ===
List of number-one artists, with total weeks spent at number one shown
Position	Artist	Weeks at No. 1
1	Nadhif Basalamah	14
2	Ari Lesmana	13
2	Enáu	13
3	Tulus	11
4	Ifan Seventeen	4
5	Idgitaf	3
6	LANY	1

== See also ==
- 2026 in music
