= APT. (song) =

2024 single by Rosé and Bruno Mars

Single by Rosé and Bruno Mars

from the album Rosie
- Language: English; Korean
- Released: 18 October 2024
- Recorded: 7 November 2023
- Studio: Glenwood Place Recording (Burbank)
- Genre: Pop; pop rock; pop-punk; new wave
- Length: 2:49
- Label: The Black Label; Atlantic
- Songwriters: Rosé; Amy Allen; Christopher Brody Brown; Rogét Chahayed; Omer Fedi; Phillip Lawrence; Bruno Mars; Theron Thomas; Henry Walter; Michael Chapman; Nicholas Chinn
- Producers: Bruno Mars; Cirkut; Omer Fedi; Rogét Chahayed

Rosé singles chronology
"Gone" (2021)	"APT." (2024)	"Number One Girl" (2024)

Bruno Mars singles chronology
"Die with a Smile" (2024)	"APT." (2024)	"Fat Juicy & Wet" (2025)

Music video
- "APT." on YouTube

"APT." is a song by New Zealand and South Korean singer Rosé and American singer-songwriter Bruno Mars. It was released through The Black Label and Atlantic Records on 18 October 2024, as the lead single from Rosé's debut studio album, Rosie (2024). "APT." marked Rosé's first solo single in three years and her first release since departing from YG Entertainment and Interscope Records in 2023. The song was written and composed by various contributors, including Rosé and Mars, and includes elements from the 1982 tune "Mickey" by Toni Basil. It is an up-tempo pop, pop rock, pop-punk, and new wave track, featuring indie rock and electropop influences. Inspired by a South Korean drinking game, the song's chorus is built around the game's rhythmic chant of apateu (Korean: 아파트; lit. 'apartment'; pronounced [a̠pʰa̠tʰɯ]).

Critics lauded "APT." for its catchy production, broad cross-cultural appeal, and its role in promoting Korean culture worldwide. It was the best-selling global single of 2025 according to the International Federation of the Phonographic Industry (IFPI), marking the first time an artist outside of North America or Europe topped the IFPI Global Single Chart and the first song with non-English lyrics to do so. The song spent 12 weeks atop the Billboard Global 200, becoming Rosé and Mars's second number-one single each and the number-one song on the 2025 year-end chart. In South Korea, it peaked at number one on the Circle Digital Chart for ten weeks. "APT." was the first song by a K-pop female soloist to top Australia's ARIA Singles Chart and the first Western song to top the Billboard Japan Hot 100 in over a decade. The song saw huge global success, topping the charts in over 50 countries including Austria, Belgium, Canada, Germany, Indonesia, New Zealand, Norway, the Philippines, Sweden, Switzerland, and Taiwan. It peaked within the top three in the United Kingdom and the United States, the first song by a K-pop female act to do either.

An accompanying music video was directed by Mars and Daniel Ramos and premiered on Rosé's YouTube channel simultaneously with the single's release. The video featured Rosé and Mars as a garage band wearing matching black leather jackets on a pink-coloured set. The song broke a number of viewership records on YouTube, including becoming the fastest music video by an Asian act to reach one billion views on the platform. "APT." was also the second-fastest song and the fastest by a K-pop artist to reach one billion streams in Spotify history, and the top song of 2025 on Apple Music. Rosé promoted the song through televised performances, including appearances with Mars at the 2024 MAMA Awards and the 68th Annual Grammy Awards. "APT." received numerous accolades, including Song of the Year at the Asia Artist Awards, MAMA Awards, and MTV Video Music Awards, and International Song of the Year at the Brit Awards, making Rosé the first K-pop artist in history to win at the latter. It earned three Grammy Award nominations for Best Pop Duo/Group Performance, Record of the Year, and Song of the Year, becoming the most-nominated song by a K-pop artist and the first to be nominated in a Big Four category as a lead artist.

== Background and promotion ==
On 29 December 2023, Rosé announced that she was moving from YG Entertainment to its associate company The Black Label for her solo work, while remaining with YG as a member of Blackpink. Prior to her departure, Rosé released her debut solo single album, R, in March 2021, featuring the songs "On the Ground" and "Gone". These releases garnered commercial success.

In August 2024, Rosé was seen attending a concert of Bruno Mars in Los Angeles, later sharing a photo of herself wearing a t-shirt from his merchandise range. In September, Rosé announced via her social media that she had signed a new global solo deal with Atlantic Records. On 16 October, Rosé posted a polaroid picture of her sitting next to Mars and revealed that she taught him a Korean drinking game. Mars also shared an Instagram story of Rosé supposedly trying to kiss him that night, promoting a potential upcoming release.

On 17 October, Rosé announced the release of the single on her social media, a day ahead of the release. An accompanying artwork was revealed alongside the announcement, featuring a black-and-white rose-tinted photo of Mars behind a drum set and Rosé lying in front of the set wearing a black leather jacket and skirt. The news of the release arrived a few weeks after the announcement of Rosé's debut studio album, Rosie, slated for release on 6 December 2024. "APT." was also included on Mars's compilation album Collaborations (2026). Mars later revealed that he and Rosé have worked on another song that is yet to be released.

== Composition and lyrics ==
"APT."
Inspired by the apateu rhythmic chant of a South Korean drinking game, the song's chorus received praise for its catchiness and energetic sound.

"APT." was written by Rosé, Amy Allen, Brody Brown, Philip Lawrence, Theron Thomas of R. City, Rogét Chahayed, Omer Fedi, Cirkut, and Mars, while being produced by the latter four; additional writing credits go to Nicky Chinn and Mike Chapman for the interpolation of Toni Basil's 1982 single "Mickey". "APT." has been described as a pop, pop-punk, pop rock, and new wave track, featuring indie rock and electropop elements. It opens with a rap verse, transitions to a "melodious" pre-chorus, and builds to an energetic chorus influenced by the Apartment game chant.

'APT' is actually my favourite Korean drinking game that I play with my friends back home. It's so simple, puts a smile on your face, and breaks the ice at any party. One night in the studio, I taught my crew how to play the game. Everyone was fascinated, especially when I started the chant, so we played around with it, and I said we should make a song out of it... and after Bruno joined the track, the rest became history!

— Rosé on the song's origins.

Inspired by a popular South Korean drinking game named "Apartment", from which the title of the song is also derived, the track employs the game's rhythmic chant of apateu (Korean: 아파트; lit. 'apartment') to create a "playful" and "addictive" chorus. Producer Rogét Chahayed revealed that the songwriting session initially began with a slower R&B-inspired idea before the collaborators decided to pursue a more upbeat direction. Rosé demonstrated the Apartment drinking game to songwriter Amy Allen, prompting Theron Thomas to suggest incorporating it into the song. The writers then began chanting "APT." over a drum beat, which became the basis for the chorus. In an interview with Vogue, Rosé admitted that she was initially "kind of freaked out" about how people would react to a song about a drinking game. Moreover, Rosé "asked her team to delete the song from their phones", only to find out "that they were already obsessed with it". She later proposed a collaboration to Mars and pitched him three songs: "Number One Girl", "3am", and "APT.", with "APT." being her preferred choice. After listening to the songs, Mars asked what the title of "APT." meant, prompting Rosé to explain that the track was based on a Korean drinking game. Rosé also expressed that she had "never thought that [the collaboration] would happen" and was "very excited" to work with Mars. Chahayed said that after Mars joined the project, he expanded the arrangement and contributed to portions of the verses and chorus while preserving the song's central drinking-game concept. On 8 November 2024, Rosé shared a behind-the-scenes video on Instagram, celebrating a year since writing and recording "APT."

== Critical reception ==
Professional ratings
Review scores
Source	Rating
IZM	3.5/5 stars
NME	5/5 stars

"APT." received widespread acclaim from music critics and fans alike. It has been included in multiple critics' year-end lists. Recognised as a cultural phenomenon, the track was acknowledged by Forbes as the most acclaimed K-pop song of 2024. NME's Rhian Daly awarded "APT." five out of five stars, calling it "a luminous banger that fizzes with playful energy, from its stomping pop-rock beat to its addictive chanted chorus." Irene Kim of Vogue also praised the track, highlighting the vocal harmony between Rosé and Bruno Mars and dubbing it "a pop-punk delight" that "will have fans chanting along". Paper included "APT." in its weekly new songs roundup, describing it as a "cheeky, rollicking pop-rock track" accompanied by an "irrepressibly fun, Ting Tings-y video". Billboard featured the song on its weekly must-hears list, lauding it as "a slick pop confection full of clap-along refrains".

South Korean critics echoed the praise, noting the song's catchy melody and inventive concept. Music critic Jeong Min-jae highlighted the repetitive, chant-like chorus of "APT.", noting its appeal to foreign listeners for its easy pronunciation and rhythmic fun. Jeong emphasised the song's addictiveness and the impact of its catchy chorus, adding that its pop-punk rock vibe aligns well with current music trends. He suggested this could help elevate K-pop's musical credibility beyond just its industry appeal. Park Seon-min, a pop culture critic and professor at Kyung Hee University, attributes the international popularity of "APT.", to its catchy lyrics, drinking game theme, and star appeal. He notes the song's addictive melody, vibrant visuals, and relatable concept. Meanwhile, popular music critic Jeong Won-seok commented that the song itself doesn't feel "fresh", as it brings to mind tracks like "Mickey" and the Ting Tings' "That's Not My Name". However, he praised it for introducing a new style rarely seen in recent K-pop, calling it a "well-made pop song" that stands apart from the usual English-language pop hits.

=== Cultural analysis ===
Critic Lim Hee-yoon noted that the song turns everyday Korean language into a global meme, much like Psy's "Gentleman" or Suga's "Daechwita", using unique pronunciations uncommon in the West. Lim also compared it to Psy's "Hangover" featuring Snoop Dogg, emphasising its reflection of Korean artists' global influence. He described the song as having a strong hook, an '80s vibe, and a melodic progression reminiscent of modern band music. Kim Do-heon, a pop music critic, emphasised the appeal of incorporating a drinking game into the track and observed that, while Rosé usually exudes "high-end" charisma, this collaboration reveals a more approachable and upbeat side, resonating well with fans.

Music critic Lim Jin-mo praised the song for its addictive quality, a key element in pop music, and noted how the song combines fun aspects of Korean culture with Bruno Mars' global appeal. He described it as a successful "glocal" fusion — combining global and local influences. On YTN Radio, pop music critic Lee Dae-hwa praised the song's catchy hook, likening it to addictive "hook songs" from the past, such as Son Dam-bi's "Crazy" and Girls' Generation's "Gee". He emphasised that short, repetitive hooks are essential in popular music, particularly in dance tracks. Dae-hwa also compared "APT." to Psy's "Gangnam Style", noting that while both use cultural elements for viral appeal, "APT." stands out for its catchy melody and contemporary relevance.

Another pop culture critic Jeong Deok-hyeon commented that K-pop is viewed as a subculture leader internationally, rather than mainstream, and praised "APT." for its strategic use of Korean elements, like the repeated word "apartment" and a music video scene of Mars waving the South Korean flag, Taegeukgi, which resonates with K-pop fans' sense of "minority sentiment" triumphing. Another critic, Kim Kyo-seok, observed that "APT." is consumed more as meme-driven short-form content, reflecting today's "age of memes". He added that Mars waving the Taegeukgi and shouting "geonbae" (cheers) is a powerful symbol of Korean culture's mainstream global appeal.

Professor Seo Kyung-deok of Sungshin Women's University praised "APT." for promoting Korean culture globally. He highlighted moments in the music video, like Mars shouting "geonbae", and noted that Korean items like somaek, "one of Korea's representative drinking cultures is being widely introduced to people around the world," boosting international interest in Korean culture. Similarly, cultural critic Chung Deok-hyun highlighted "APT." as a blend of Korean culture and pop music, with American producers adding global appeal. He sees it as a milestone for K-pop, showing how artists like Rosé can connect K-pop with the global music market.

Japanese author and former Tokyo University of Foreign Studies professor Hideki Noma highlighted the unique appeal of the song, calling it a "victory of plurilingualism" for its blend of the English and Korean languages, Western pop, and Korean game slogans. In an interview with The Hankook Ilbo, he praised how the songmixes English and Korean without relying on traditional storytelling. He also noted that the repeated Korean aspirated sounds "ㅍ" (p) and "ㅌ" (t) add rhythm and charm to the word "apartment", allowing non-Korean speakers to appreciate its sound "while leaving the meaning of the word a little mystery".

=== Year-end lists ===
Critics' year-end rankings
Publication	List	Rank	Ref.
Billboard	Staff List: The 100 Best Songs of 2024	56	
Consequence	200 Best Songs of 2024	166	
Dazed	The 50 best K-pop tracks of 2024	—N/a	
NME	The 50 best songs of 2024	14	
NME	The 25 best K-pop songs of 2024	2	
Paste	The 100 Best Songs of 2024	87	
Paste	The 20 Best K-Pop Songs of 2024	3	
Rolling Stone	Rob Sheffield's Top 25 Songs of 2024	23	
Rolling Stone	The 100 Best Songs of 2024	21	
Rolling Stone Korea	2024 Ranking: Musicians on Musicians	—N/a	
Rolling Stone Korea	2025 Ranking: Song of the Year	—N/a	
Spotify	100 Greatest Pop Songs of the Streaming Era	64	
Stereogum	The Top 40 Pop Songs Of 2024	35	
Teen Vogue	The Best K-pop Songs of 2024, According to K-pop Songwriters	—N/a	
Uproxx	The Best Songs Of 2024	—N/a	
USA Today	10 Best Songs of 2024	9	

== Impact ==
"APT." was named the Song of the Year by South Korean research company Gallup Korea's annual public survey, conducted in 2024 among respondents under the age of 40. It was the second-most searched song globally on Google in 2024. The song ranked first as the most loved song of 2025 by TikTok users in South Korea, and among the top 20 songs of the year globally on the platform. It was also used as a protest song in the 2024 South Korean martial law crisis. The song boosted HiteJinro's stock by 6% to 21,200 won, with trading volume exceeding 1 million shares. Investors were optimistic about further gains, with a company official noting that somaek could become a global topic due to Rosé's influence. He remarked, "Rosé has turned Korea's play culture into music, showing how to make somaek, which we hope will spark international interest in Korean soju". HiteJinro announced that they were exploring social media marketing strategies tied to Rosé's music video and soju tutorials to enhance exports amid sluggish domestic sales. Additionally, YG Plus, the company handling distribution for Rosé's solo work under The Black Label, saw its stock rise 157.8% over six trading days. Analyst Lim Su-jin from Daishin Securities said "APT." boosted investor confidence in the entertainment industry by showing that K-pop is still popular in Western countries.

The song has also been credited with reviving interest in Yoon Soo-il's 1982 hit "Apartment" (아파트), which saw a 190% streaming increase on Genie Music following the release of Rosé and Bruno Mars' duet. In a phone interview with Yonhap News, Yoon expressed gratitude for the revival, stating, "I am grateful that Rosé and Bruno Mars reconstructed my song". He also noted the positive reception of viral mixes and highlighted the catchy "apateu apateu" line.

== Accolades ==
"APT." won eight first-place awards on South Korean music programmes. It additionally won three weekly Melon Popularity Awards on 28 October, 4 November, and 18 November 2024. Due to the song's success, Rosé and Mars jointly received the Global Sensation award at the 2024 MAMA Awards, as well as the Best Group International award at the 2026 Swiss Music Awards. With "APT.", Rosé became the first K-pop act in history to win Song of the Year at the 2025 MTV Video Music Awards. The song received three nominations at the 68th Annual Grammy Awards for Best Pop Duo/Group Performance, Record of the Year, and Song of the Year, becoming the most-nominated song by any Korean or K-pop artist in Grammy history and making Rosé the first K-pop artist to receive a nomination for one of the Big Four Grammy awards as a lead artist. "APT." won the Brit Award for International Song of the Year, making Rosé the first K-pop artist in history to win at the award ceremony.

Awards and nominations
Organisation	Year	Category	Result	Ref.
American Music Awards	2025	Collaboration of the Year	Nominated	
APRA Music Awards	2026	Most Performed International Work	Nominated	
ASCAP Pop Music Awards	2026	Most-Performed Songs of 2025	Won	
Asia Artist Awards	2024	Song of the Year	Won	
Asian Pop Music Awards	2024	Best Collaboration (Overseas)	Won	
Asian Pop Music Awards	2024	Top 20 Songs of the Year (Overseas)	Won	
Asian Pop Music Awards	2024	Song of the Year (Overseas)	Nominated	
BreakTudo Awards	2025	International Hit of the Year	Nominated	
Brit Awards	2026	International Song of the Year	Won	
Grammy Awards	2026	Best Pop Duo/Group Performance	Nominated	
Grammy Awards	2026	Record of the Year	Nominated	
Grammy Awards	2026	Song of the Year	Nominated	
Hito Music Awards	2025	Western Song of the Year	Won	
iHeartRadio Music Awards	2025	Best Music Video	Nominated	
iHeartRadio Music Awards	2026	Best Collaboration	Won	
iHeartRadio Music Awards	2026	K-pop Song of the Year	Nominated	
Japan Gold Disc Awards	2025	Song of the Year by Streaming (Western)	Won	
Korean Music Awards	2025	Best K-pop Song	Nominated	
Korean Music Awards	2025	Song of the Year	Nominated	
MAMA Awards	2025	Best Collaboration	Won	
MAMA Awards	2025	Song of the Year	Won	
MTV Video Music Awards	2025	Song of the Year	Won	
MTV Video Music Awards	2025	Best Art Direction	Nominated	
MTV Video Music Awards	2025	Best Collaboration	Nominated	
MTV Video Music Awards	2025	Best Direction	Nominated	
MTV Video Music Awards	2025	Best Pop	Nominated	
MTV Video Music Awards	2025	Best Visual Effects	Nominated	
MTV Video Music Awards	2025	Video of the Year	Nominated	
MTV Video Music Awards Japan	2025	Best Collaboration Video (International)	Won	
MTV Video Music Awards Japan	2025	Video of the Year	Nominated	
Music Awards Japan	2025	Best International Pop Song in Japan	Won	
Music Awards Japan	2025	Best of Listeners' Choice: International Song	Nominated	
Music Awards Japan	2025	Song of the Year	Nominated	
NetEase Cloud Music Awards	2024	Hot Collaborative Single of the Year	Won	
Nickelodeon Kids' Choice Awards	2025	Favorite Music Collaboration	Nominated	
NRJ Music Awards	2025	International Collab/Duo	Won	
Philippine K-pop Awards	2024	Best Collaboration of the Year	Won	
Premios Odeón	2026	Best International Song	Won	
Rockbjörnen	2025	Foreign Song of the Year	Nominated	
RTHK International Pop Poll Awards	2025	Top Ten International Gold Songs	Won	
Webby Awards	2025	Arts & Entertainment, Social Video Short Form (Social) (Note: Nominated for APT. YouTube Shorts Challenge)	Won	

World records
Year	Organisation	Award	Ref.
2024	Guinness World Records	First K-pop artist to reach No. 1 on Apple Music's Top 100: Global chart	
2025	Guinness World Records	First female K-pop artist to enter the Billboard Radio Songs Top 10	
2025	Guinness World Records	Fastest K-pop track to reach 1 billion streams on Spotify	
2025	Guinness World Records	First K-pop act to be Grammy-nominated for Record of the Year	
2025	Guinness World Records	First K-pop act to be Grammy-nominated for Song of the Year	

Music program awards
Program	Date	Ref.
Inkigayo	27 October 2024	
Inkigayo	3 November 2024	
Inkigayo	10 November 2024	
M Countdown	24 October 2024	
M Countdown	31 October 2024	
Show! Music Core	2 November 2024	
Show! Music Core	9 November 2024	
Show! Music Core	16 November 2024	
Music Bank	3 January 2025	

== Commercial performance ==
=== Global ===
"APT." became a commercial success in both the United States and the world upon release, topping Spotify's global and US daily streaming charts. The song surpassed 100 million streams on Spotify within seven days of its release, setting the fastest record for a K-pop female solo artist and the second fastest for any K-pop singer. It reached one billion streams on the platform on 26 January 2025, exactly 100 days after its release. With this, it became the second-fastest song in history to surpass the mark after Lady Gaga and Mars' "Die with a Smile" (2024). It also broke the record for the fastest song by a K-pop act to reach one billion streams in history, which was previously held by Jungkook's "Seven" featuring Latto (2023). It was crowned the biggest song of 2025 on Apple Music as the most-streamed song globally, most-identified on Shazam, most-spun on radio, and the track with the most-read lyrics of the year.

"APT." debuted at number one on both the Billboard Global 200 and the Global Excl. US, marking Rosé and Mars' second number-one single on either chart after Rosé's "On the Ground" (2021) and Mars' "Die with a Smile" respectively. Rosé became the first member of Blackpink with multiple number-one songs as a soloist, surpassing Jennie and Lisa's one each on the latter chart. On the Global 200, "APT." earned 224.5 million streams and 29,000 sales worldwide between 18 and 24 October, claiming the second-biggest streaming week in the chart's history behind BTS' "Butter" (2021). It surpassed Jungkook's "Seven" and Blackpink's "Pink Venom" (2022) to achieve the biggest streaming week by a solo artist and by a K-pop female act in history. On the Global Excl. US, the song debuted at number one with 200 million streams and 21,000 sold outside the US during its first week of release. "APT." spent a second week at number one on both the Billboard Global 200 and Global Excl. US; on the former, it claimed the sixth-biggest streaming week ever with 207.5 million streams and became the first song in the chart's history to have tallied over 200 million streams worldwide for multiple weeks. The song topped both charts for nine consecutive weeks, which became nine of the top ten global streaming weeks among songs released in 2024. As a result, it became the longest-running number-one song of 2024 on the Global 200, surpassing the eight-week reign of "Die with a Smile". It also became the longest-running number-one song of 2024 on the Global Excl. US, surpassing the eight-week reigns of "Die with a Smile", Benson Boone's "Beautiful Things", and Sabrina Carpenter's "Espresso". In total, the song earned 12 non-consecutive weeks at number one on the Global 200, becoming the fourth longest-running number-one hit in the chart's history. It also spent a total of 19 non-consecutive weeks at number one on the Global Excl. US, surpassing Mariah Carey's "All I Want for Christmas Is You" as the longest-running number-one hit on the chart in history.

"APT." was the 17th best-selling global single of 2024, earning one billion subscription streams equivalents worldwide according to the International Federation of the Phonographic Industry (IFPI). It was the second biggest-song globally on Luminate's 2025 midyear report, earning 1.624 billion on-demand audio streams in the first half of the year. "APT." was crowned the number-one best-selling global single of 2025, earning 2.06 billion subscription streams equivalents worldwide according to the IFPI. It marked the first time the IFPI Global Single Chart was topped by an artist outside of North America or Europe, and the first time a winning single featured non-English lyrics. The win also marked Rosé's first and Mars' second number-one IFPI Global Single (his first being "Just the Way You Are" in 2011).

=== Asia ===
In South Korea, iChart announced on 27 October that "APT." had achieved a perfect all-kill, meaning it simultaneously reached number one on all real-time, daily, and weekly charts in the country. It marked Rosé's first time achieving the feat outside of Blackpink and made her the first K-pop soloist of the decade to earn this milestone both solo and as a group. The song debuted at number 17 on the Circle Digital Chart with under two days of tracking and peaked at number one the following week. "APT." remained atop the chart for six consecutive weeks and ten overall weeks. In Japan, the song peaked at number one on the Billboard Japan Hot 100 chart dated 20 November 2024 becoming the fifth Western song to top the chart, the first in over 11 years since The Wanted's "Glad You Came" in 2013. It spent three consecutive weeks at the top spot, with four overall, and became the first Western song to achieve multiple consecutive weeks at number one. "APT." also became the first song by a non-Japanese artist in three years to spend two consecutive weeks at the top of Japan's Oricon Streaming Chart, a feat last achieved by BTS with "Permission to Dance" in 2021.

=== Oceania ===
In New Zealand, "APT." debuted atop the New Zealand Singles Chart, becoming Rosé's first chart-topper in her country of birth, as well as Mars' sixth. In Australia, where Rosé was raised, the song debuted at number one on the ARIA Singles Chart, making Rose the first solo K-pop artist to top the chart since Psy's "Gangnam Style" (2012). She became the first solo female K-pop artist to ever top the chart, having also previously topped the chart as a member of Blackpink with "Pink Venom" in 2022. For Mars, "APT." became his fourth number-one hit in Australia after "Just The Way You Are" and "Grenade" in 2010 and "Uptown Funk" with Mark Ronson in 2014. "APT." spent its first three weeks atop the chart, marking the first time that a Korean act had multiple weeks in the top spot since "Gangnam Style". It went on to yop the chart for a total of fourteen non-consecutive weeks. With this, "APT." became Mars' longest-running number-one single on the chart, surpassing the six weeks achieved by "Uptown Funk". It also became the longest-running number-one song released in 2024, surpassing the eight week reign of Sabrina Carpenter's "Taste", and the longest-running number-one duet since Elton John and Dua Lipa's "Cold Heart (Pnau remix)" (2021).

=== North America ===
In the United States, "APT." earned 3.57 million streams on the day of its debut and 3 million daily streams for each of the next three days for a total of 13.32 million streams in its first four days of release. It also sold 5,700 downloads in the US over its opening four-day period. The song ultimately debuted at number eight on the Billboard Hot 100 with 25 million streams, 3.2 million in airplay audience and 14,000 sold in the US, becoming Rosé's first and Mars' 20th top-ten hit in the country respectively. Rosé became the first K-pop female act to reach the top ten, outpacing her group Blackpink's number 13 peak with "Ice Cream" (2020), and joined Psy, BTS, Jimin, and Jungkook as the only K-pop acts to enter the top ten in history. On 11 January 2025, the song re-entered the top ten at number five, making Rosé the first-ever K-pop female act with a top-five entry. After three weeks at number five, "APT." rose to a new peak at number three on the Hot 100 on 1 February and held its peak for two consecutive weeks.

On the Digital Song Sales chart, "APT." peaked at number one on 25 January with 6,000 units sold, becoming Rosé's first and Mars' eleventh number one. Rosé became the first K-pop female artist to top the chart, while Mars earned the ninth-most number-one songs of any artist. The song's movement to number three on the Hot 100 led to the song simultaneously topping the Billboard Pop Airplay chart on 1 February, becoming the first song by a K-pop artist to achieve the feat. It also became the second song by a K-pop soloist to enter the chart's top ten after "Gangnam Style" at number five, as well as the fifth overall by a K-pop act. In its 34th week on the Billboard Hot 100, the song surpassed "Who" by Jimin to become the longest-charting song by a K-pop act in the chart's history. It ranked as tenth-most heard song on US radio in the first half of 2025, with a cumulative 1.110 billion audience impressions across all formats, according to Luminate's 2025 midyear report.

In Canada, "APT." debuted at number two on the Billboard Canadian Hot 100, a higher chart peak than any Blackpink single. In its 18th week, "APT." reached number one, making Rosé the first K-pop female artist to top the chart. Prior to reaching number one, the song held the runner-up spot for nine non-consecutive weeks. It ranked as the fourth biggest-song in Canada in the first half of 2025 with 47.7 million on-demand audio streams, according to Luminate's 2025 midyear report.

=== Other ===
In the United Kingdom, the song debuted at number four on the UK Singles Chart, making Rosé the first K-pop female soloist to earn a top-ten single on the chart. The following week, "APT." rose to a new peak at number two, meaning Rosé broke her own record for the highest peak by any female K-pop solo artist. The song ranked as the third-biggest song in the UK of 2025 as of July, with 942,000 chart units achieved. It was also the most-streamed music video in the UK in the first half of 2025 with 22.3 million video streams. In Ireland, the song debuted at number nine on the Irish Singles Chart, which earned Rosé her first top-ten single on the chart. It later rose to a new peak at number three on its eleventh week and held that position for six consecutive weeks. In Brazil, the song debuted at number seven on the Billboard Brasil Hot 100. The single peaked at number two in France and was certified diamond by Syndicat national de l'édition phonographique (SNEP).

== Music video ==
Co-directed by Mars and Daniel Ramos, the music video was released in conjunction with the single on 18 October 2024. The video features Rosé and Mars presenting a garage band-esque performance, with the two singers alternating on drums and vocals, in matching black leather jackets across a pink set. Throughout the video, the duo can be seen dancing and playing the titular game, as well as Mars waving Taegeukgi flags and getting "flustered" by Rosé's unexpected kiss.

=== Reception ===
On 30 October 2024, the music video surpassed 200 million views on YouTube in 11 days and 22 hours, setting the record as the fastest female K-pop solo artist video to achieve the milestone. On 5 December, it broke the record for the fastest K-pop artist to reach 500 million views on the platform. The music video then surpassed one billion views on 31 January 2025, 105 days since its release, becoming the fifth-fastest video overall and the fastest music video by a K-pop artist to hit the milestone, breaking the 158-day record previously set by Psy's "Gangnam Style".

Reporter Yang Seung-jun of The Korea Times highlighted the unique approach of the music video, noting that Rosé played a key role in setting its creative direction alongside director Daniel Ramos. The production embraced a lighthearted, "dance-and-play B-grade" concept, deliberately moving away from the hallmarks of traditional K-pop music videos. Absent were the elaborate "storytelling [and] flawless choreography" that often define the genre. Instead, the video showcased the "pop songification of K-pop", which Yang identified as the secret behind the compelling synergy between Rosé and Mars.

== Live performances ==
Rosé and Mars performed "APT." live for the first time for the 2024 MAMA Awards in Osaka on 22 November 2024. The pre-recorded performance, which was accompanied by a live band, featured the pair in coordinated suits as they worked through playful choreography. Rosé later performed the song with Lee Young-ji on an episode of The Seasons: Lee Young-ji's Rainbow aired on 29 November. On 3 December, she performed the song, as well as a cover of "Last Christmas" by Wham!, on BBC Radio 1's Christmas Live Lounge 2024. She additionally performed a medley of the song and her single "Toxic Till the End" on The Tonight Show Starring Jimmy Fallon on 11 December.

On 23 January 2025, Rosé performed "Stay a Little Longer", "Toxic Till the End", and "APT." at the Gala des Pièces Jaunes 2025 at the Paris La Défense Arena. She also performed "APT." as the conclusion of her set as a special guest at the Japanese music festival GMO Sonic 2025, held at the Saitama Super Arena on 26 January. On 22 and 25 April, Rosé performed the song together with Coldplay at the band's Music of the Spheres World Tour concerts at Goyang Stadium. On 28 June, she performed the song alongside "Toxic Till the End" and "Dance All Night" as a special guest at Psy's Summer Swag 2025 concert. "APT." was later included in Blackpink's Deadline World Tour setlist as a part of Rosé's solo set. On 22 September, Rosé performed "APT." on The Howard Stern Show. Mars and Rosé also performed the song at the Grammys.

== Credits and personnel ==
Credits adapted from CD liner notes.

Recording

- Recorded at Glenwood Place Recording (Burbank, California)
- Mixed at MixStar Studios (Virginia Beach, Virginia)
- Mastered at Sterling Sound (New York City)

Personnel

- Rosé – vocals, songwriter
- Bruno Mars – vocals, songwriter, producer
- Omer Fedi – songwriter, producer, guitar, synthesiser
- Cirkut – songwriter, producer
- Rogét Chahayed – songwriter, producer
- Amy Allen – songwriter
- Christopher "Brody" Brown – songwriter
- Philip Lawrence – songwriter
- Theron Thomas – songwriter
- Michael Chapman – songwriter
- Nicholas Chinn – songwriter
- Charles Moniz – engineering
- Julian Vasquez – engineering
- Alex Resoagli – engineering assistance
- Robert Palma – engineering assistance
- Serban Ghenea – mix engineer
- Bryce Bordone – assistant mix engineer
- Chris Gehringer – mastering engineer

== Charts ==
=== Weekly charts ===
List of chart positions
Chart (2024–2025)	Peak position
Argentina Hot 100 (Billboard)	14
Argentina Airplay (Monitor Latino)	9
Australia (ARIA)	1
Austria (Ö3 Austria Top 40)	1
Belarus Airplay (TopHit)	2
Belgium (Ultratop 50 Flanders)	1
Belgium (Ultratop 50 Wallonia)	1
Bolivia (Billboard)	4
Bolivia Airplay (Monitor Latino)	3
Brazil Hot 100 (Billboard)	7
Bulgaria Airplay (PROPHON)	1
Canada Hot 100 (Billboard)	1
Canada AC (Billboard)	7
Canada CHR/Top 40 (Billboard)	1
Canada Hot AC (Billboard)	1
Central America Airplay (Monitor Latino)	9
Central America + Caribbean (BMAT)	7
CIS Airplay (TopHit)	1
Chile (Billboard)	8
Chile Airplay (Monitor Latino)	3
China (TME Korean)	2
Colombia Anglo Airplay (National-Report)	1
Costa Rica Airplay (Monitor Latino)	3
Costa Rica Streaming (FONOTICA)	9
Croatia (Billboard)	13
Croatia International Airplay (Top lista)	3
Czech Republic Airplay (ČNS IFPI)	1
Czech Republic Singles Digital (ČNS IFPI)	3
Denmark (Tracklisten)	6
Dominican Republic Anglo Airplay (Monitor Latino)	1
Ecuador (Billboard)	14
Ecuador Airplay (Monitor Latino)	5
Egypt (IFPI)	6
El Salvador Airplay (ASAP EGC)	5
Estonia Airplay (TopHit)	1
Finland (Suomen virallinen lista)	15
France (SNEP)	2
Germany (GfK)	1
Global 200 (Billboard)	1
Greece International (IFPI)	2
Guatemala Airplay (Monitor Latino)	17
Honduras Anglo Airplay (Monitor Latino)	1
Hong Kong (Billboard)	1
Hungary (Single Top 40)	5
Iceland (Tónlistinn)	1
India (Billboard)	12
India International (IMI)	1
Indonesia (ASIRI)	1
Ireland (IRMA)	3
Israel (Mako Hitlist)	5
Italy (FIMI)	8
Japan Hot 100 (Billboard)	1
Japan Combined Singles (Oricon)	1
Kazakhstan Airplay (TopHit)	1
Latin America Anglo Airplay (Monitor Latino)	1
Latvia Airplay (LaIPA)	1
Latvia Streaming (LaIPA)	2
Lebanon (Lebanese Top 20)	2
Lithuania (AGATA)	5
Luxembourg (Billboard)	1
Malaysia International (RIM)	1
Malta Airplay (Radiomonitor)	1
Mexico (Billboard)	24
Mexico Airplay (Monitor Latino)	8
Middle East and North Africa (IFPI)	1
Moldova Airplay (TopHit)	1
Netherlands (Dutch Top 40)	1
Netherlands (Single Top 100)	3
New Zealand (Recorded Music NZ)	1
Nicaragua Airplay (Monitor Latino)	12
Nigeria (TurnTable Top 100)	21
North Africa (IFPI)	4
North Macedonia Airplay (Radiomonitor)	1
Norway (VG-lista)	1
Panama Airplay (Monitor Latino)	2
Panama International (PRODUCE)	4
Paraguay Airplay (Monitor Latino)	3
Peru Airplay (Monitor Latino)	2
Philippines Hot 100 (Billboard Philippines)	1
Poland Airplay (OLiS)	1
Poland Streaming (OLiS)	3
Portugal (AFP)	6
Puerto Rico Airplay (Monitor Latino)	9
Romania Airplay (UPFR)	1
Romania Airplay (Media Forest)	1
Romania TV Airplay (Media Forest)	1
Russia Airplay (TopHit)	1
Russia Streaming (TopHit) (Note: The Russian Streaming chart was launched in late March 2025. Therefore, "APT." did not have a full run on the chart.)	100
San Marino (SMRRTV Top 50)	1
Saudi Arabia (IFPI)	2
Serbia Airplay (Radiomonitor)	1
Singapore (RIAS)	1
Slovakia Airplay (ČNS IFPI)	5
Slovakia Singles Digital (ČNS IFPI)	2
Slovenia Airplay (Radiomonitor)	1
South Africa Streaming (TOSAC)	1
South Korea (Circle)	1
Spain (Promusicae)	12
Sweden (Sverigetopplistan)	1
Switzerland (Schweizer Hitparade)	1
Taiwan (Billboard)	1
Thailand (IFPI)	10
Turkey International Airplay (Radiomonitor Türkiye)	1
United Arab Emirates (IFPI)	1
Ukraine Airplay (TopHit)	1
UK Singles (Official Charts)	2
Uruguay Airplay (Monitor Latino)	2
US Billboard Hot 100	3
US Adult Contemporary (Billboard)	16
US Adult Pop Airplay (Billboard)	2
US Dance Airplay (Billboard)	13
US Latin Airplay (Billboard)	45
US Pop Airplay (Billboard)	1
US Rhythmic Airplay (Billboard)	35
Venezuela Airplay (Record Report)	1
Vietnam (IFPI)	7

=== Monthly charts ===
List of chart positions
Chart (2024–2025)	Peak position
Belarus Airplay (TopHit)	3
Brazil Streaming (Pro-Música Brasil)	21
CIS Airplay (TopHit)	1
Czech Republic (Rádio Top 100)	19
Estonia Airplay (TopHit)	2
Kazakhstan Airplay (TopHit)	1
Latvia Airplay (TopHit)	4
Lithuania Airplay (TopHit)	1
Moldova Airplay (TopHit)	2
Romania Airplay (TopHit)	1
Russia Airplay (TopHit)	1
Russia Streaming (TopHit)	98
Slovakia (Rádio Top 100)	5
South Korea (Circle)	1
Ukraine Airplay (TopHit)	1

=== Year-end charts ===
List of chart positions
Chart (2024)	Position
Australia (ARIA)	58
Austria (Ö3 Austria Top 40)	61
CIS Airplay (TopHit)	62
Estonia Airplay (TopHit)	199
Global Singles (IFPI)	17
Lithuania Airplay (TopHit)	163
Netherlands (Dutch Top 40)	78
Philippines (Philippines Hot 100)	42
Romania Airplay (TopHit)	81
Russia Airplay (TopHit)	100
South Korea (Circle)	25
Switzerland (Schweizer Hitparade)	97

List of chart positions
Chart (2025)	Position
Argentina Airplay (Monitor Latino)	9
Australia (ARIA)	3
Austria (Ö3 Austria Top 40)	3
Belarus Airplay (TopHit)	24
Belgium (Ultratop 50 Flanders)	5
Belgium (Ultratop 50 Wallonia)	3
Bolivia Airplay (Monitor Latino)	10
Bulgaria Airplay (PROPHON)	1
Canada (Canadian Hot 100)	3
Canada AC (Billboard)	9
Canada CHR/Top 40 (Billboard)	7
Canada Hot AC (Billboard)	6
Central America Airplay (Monitor Latino)	21
Chile Airplay (Monitor Latino)	4
Costa Rica Airplay (Monitor Latino)	11
Colombia Anglo Airplay (Monitor Latino)	2
CIS Airplay (TopHit)	1
Czech Republic Singles Digital (ČNS IFPI)	5
Denmark (Tracklisten)	33
Dominican Republic Airplay (Monitor Latino)	100
Ecuador Airplay (Monitor Latino)	12
Estonia Airplay (TopHit)	25
El Salvador Anglo Airplay (Monitor Latino)	1
France (SNEP)	8
Germany (GfK)	2
Global 200 (Billboard)	1
Global Singles (IFPI)	1
Guatemala Airplay (Monitor Latino)	75
Honduras Anglo Airplay (Monitor Latino)	1
Hungary (Single Top 40)	24
Iceland (Tónlistinn)	22
India International (IMI)	8
Israel (Mako Hitlist)	14
Italy (FIMI)	40
Japan (Japan Hot 100)	3
Kazakhstan Airplay (TopHit)	9
Latvia Airplay (TopHit)	18
Lithuania Airplay (TopHit)	2
Mexico Airplay (Monitor Latino)	5
Moldova Airplay (TopHit)	3
Netherlands (Dutch Top 40)	7
Netherlands (Single Top 100)	8
New Zealand (Recorded Music NZ)	4
Nicaragua Airplay (Monitor Latino)	44
Norway (Topplista)	3
Panama Airplay (Monitor Latino)	8
Paraguay Airplay (Monitor Latino)	13
Peru Airplay (Monitor Latino)	8
Philippines (Philippines Hot 100)	33
Poland (Polish Airplay Top 100)	11
Poland (Polish Streaming Top 100)	11
Puerto Rico Airplay (Monitor Latino)	21
Romania Airplay (TopHit)	19
Russia Airplay (TopHit)	16
Slovakia Singles Digital (ČNS IFPI)	5
South Korea (Circle)	7
Spain (PROMUSICAE)	27
Sweden (Sverigetopplistan)	5
Switzerland (Schweizer Hitparade)	2
Ukraine Airplay (FDR)	3
UK Singles (OCC)	5
Uruguay Airplay (Monitor Latino)	11
US Billboard Hot 100	9
US Adult Contemporary (Billboard)	26
US Adult Pop Airplay (Billboard)	9
US Pop Airplay (Billboard)	9
Venezuela Airplay (Monitor Latino)	83

== Certifications ==
List of certifications
Region	Certification	Certified units/sales
Australia (ARIA)	8× Platinum	560,000^{‡}
Austria (IFPI Austria)	2× Platinum	60,000^{‡}
Canada (Music Canada)	9× Platinum	720,000^{‡}
Denmark (IFPI Danmark)	Platinum	90,000^{‡}
France (SNEP)	Diamond	333,333^{‡}
Germany (BVMI)	3× Gold	900,000^{‡}
Italy (FIMI)	Platinum	200,000^{‡}
Japan (RIAJ)	Gold	100,000^{*}
New Zealand (RMNZ)	5× Platinum	150,000^{‡}
Nigeria (TCSN)	Silver	25,000^{‡}
Poland (ZPAV)	Diamond	500,000^{‡}
Portugal (AFP)	4× Platinum	40,000^{‡}
Spain (Promusicae)	2× Platinum	120,000^{‡}
Switzerland (IFPI Switzerland)	2× Platinum	60,000^{‡}
United Kingdom (BPI)	3× Platinum	1,800,000^{‡}
United States (RIAA)	5× Platinum	5,000,000^{‡}
Streaming
Greece (IFPI Greece)	3× Platinum	6,000,000^{†}
Japan (RIAJ)	3× Platinum	300,000,000^{†}
Slovakia (ČNS IFPI)	Platinum	1,700,000^{†}
South Korea (KMCA)	Platinum	100,000,000^{†}
Worldwide	—	3,060,000,000
^{*} Sales figures based on certification alone.^{‡} Sales+streaming figures based on certification alone.^{†} Streaming-only figures based on certification alone.

== Release history ==
List of release history, showing region(s), date(s), format(s) and label(s)
Region	Date	Format	Label	Ref.
Various	18 October 2024	CD; digital download; streaming	The Black Label; Atlantic	
Italy	18 October 2024	Radio airplay	Warner Italy	
United States	22 October 2024	Contemporary hit radio	Atlantic	
United States	23 October 2024	Adult contemporary radio	Atlantic	
Various	March 2025	7-inch vinyl	The Black Label; Atlantic	

== See also ==
- Billboard Year-End Hot 100 singles of 2025
- List of best-selling singles
- List of Billboard Global 200 number ones of 2024
- List of Billboard Global 200 number ones of 2025
- List of Billboard Hot 100 top-ten singles in 2024
- List of Billboard Hot 100 top-ten singles in 2025
- List of Billboard Pop Airplay number-one songs of 2025
- List of Canadian Hot 100 number-one singles of 2025
- List of Circle Digital Chart number ones of 2024
- List of Circle Digital Chart number ones of 2025
- List of Billboard Digital Song Sales number ones of 2025
- List of Hot 100 number-one singles of 2024 (Japan)
- List of Hot 100 number-one singles of 2025 (Japan)
- List of Inkigayo Chart winners (2024)
- List of K-pop songs on the Billboard charts
- List of M Countdown Chart winners (2024)
- List of Music Bank Chart winners (2025)
- List of number-one hits of 2025 (Germany)
- List of number-one hits of 2025 (Switzerland)
- List of number-one singles (India)
- List of number-one singles from the 2020s (New Zealand)
- List of number-one singles of 2024 (Australia)
- List of number-one singles of 2024 (Indonesia)
- List of number-one singles of 2025 (Australia)
- List of number-one singles of the 2020s (Norway)
- List of number-one songs (Hong Kong)
- List of number-one songs of 2024 (Malaysia)
- List of number-one songs of 2024 (Singapore)
- List of number-one songs of 2025 (Malaysia)
- List of number-one songs of 2025 (Singapore)
- List of Philippines Hot 100 number-one singles
- List of Show! Music Core Chart winners (2024)
- List of top 10 singles in 2025 (Ireland)
- List of UK Singles Downloads Chart number ones of the 2020s
- List of UK top-ten singles in 2024
- List of UK top-ten singles in 2025
- List of Ultratop 50 number-one singles of 2025
