= List of Billboard Digital Song Sales number ones of 2025 =

2025 highest-selling digital singles in the United States

The Billboard Digital Song Sales chart is a chart that ranks the most downloaded songs in the United States. Its data is compiled by Nielsen SoundScan based on each song's weekly digital sales, which combines sales of different versions of a song by an act for a summarized figure.

== Chart history ==
Key
†	Indicates best-selling song of 2025

Issue date	Song	Artist(s)	Weekly sales	Ref(s)
January 4	"All I Want for Christmas Is You"	Mariah Carey	8,000	
January 11	"Smile"	Morgan Wallen	—N/a	
January 18	"Smile"	Morgan Wallen	7,000	
January 25	"APT."	Rosé and Bruno Mars	6,000	
February 1	"Daddy's Home"	Tom MacDonald and Roseanne Barr	—N/a	
February 8	"Messy"	Lola Young	—N/a (Note: The best overall selling song of the week was "4x4" by Travis Scott with 167,000 digital and physical sales combined.)	
February 15	"I'm the Problem"	Morgan Wallen	15,000	
February 22	"Not Like Us"	Kendrick Lamar	33,000	
March 1	"Nokia"	Drake	16,000	
March 8	"Man in the Sky"	Tom MacDonald	—N/a	
March 15	"Pink Pony Club"	Chappell Roan	6,000	
March 22	"Sweet Dreams"	J-Hope featuring Miguel	—N/a	
March 29	"Anxiety"	Doechii	11,000	
April 5	"Mona Lisa"	J-Hope	—N/a	
April 12	"Anxiety"	Doechii	—N/a	
April 19	"All the Way"	BigXthaPlug featuring Bailey Zimmerman	8,000	
April 26	"Ordinary" †	Alex Warren	6,000	
May 3	"Hard Fought Hallelujah"	Brandon Lake	9,000	
May 10	"Ordinary" †	Alex Warren	7,000	
May 17	"Ordinary" †	Alex Warren	6,000	
May 24	"Ordinary" †	Alex Warren	7,000	
May 31	"Don't Say You Love Me"	Jin	13,000	
June 7	"Ordinary" †	Alex Warren	8,000	
June 14	"Ordinary" †	Alex Warren	7,000	
June 21	"Ordinary" †	Alex Warren	7,000 (Note: The best overall selling song of the week was "Manchild" by Sabrina Carpenter with 20,000 digital and physical sales combined.)	
June 28	"Killin' It Girl"	J-Hope and GloRilla	18,000	
July 5	"Outside"	Cardi B	14,000	
July 12	"Ordinary" †	Alex Warren	7,000 (Note: The best overall selling song of the week was "The Giver" by Chappell Roan with 57,000 digital and physical sales combined.)	
July 19	"What Did I Miss?"	Drake	6,000	
July 26	"Ordinary" †	Alex Warren	6,000	
August 2	"Mama, I'm Coming Home"	Ozzy Osbourne	15,000	
August 9	"Mama, I'm Coming Home"	Ozzy Osbourne	—N/a	
August 16	"Ordinary" †	Alex Warren	8,000	
August 23	"Ordinary" †	Alex Warren	7,000	
August 30	"The Devil Is a Democrat"	Tom MacDonald	—N/a	
September 6	"Golden"	Huntrix	9,000	
September 13	"Golden"	Huntrix	9,000	
September 20	"Ordinary" †	Alex Warren	—N/a	
September 27	"Charlie"	Tom MacDonald	18,000	
October 4	"Gratitude"	Brandon Lake	7,000	
October 11	"Golden"	Huntrix	6,000	
October 18	"Golden"	Huntrix	7,000	
October 25	"The Fate of Ophelia"	Taylor Swift	11,000	
November 1	"The Fate of Ophelia"	Taylor Swift	6,000	
November 8	"The Fate of Ophelia"	Taylor Swift	22,000	
November 15	"The Fate of Ophelia"	Taylor Swift	29,000	
November 22	"The Fate of Ophelia"	Taylor Swift	10,000 (Note: The song had overall 25,000 digital and physical sales combined.)	
November 29	"Choosin' Texas"	Ella Langley	—N/a (Note: The best overall selling song of the week was "The Fate of Ophelia" by Taylor Swift with 19,000 digital and physical sales combined.)	
December 6	"The Fate of Ophelia"	Taylor Swift	25,000	
December 13	"Golden"	Huntrix	4,000	
December 20	"Turn the Lights Off"	Kato featuring Jon	—N/a	
December 27	"Turn the Lights Off"	Kato featuring Jon	—N/a	
