= Hipdut =

Musical genre

- Native name: Hip-hop dangdut
- Stylistic origins: Dangdut; hip hop; koplo; trap; electronic music
- Cultural origins: Early 2010s, Java, Indonesia
- Typical instruments: Kendang, electronic beats, synthesizers, flute, hip-hop rhythmic elements

Hipdut or hip-dut is an Indonesian fusion genre that combines elements of hip hop and dangdut. It is commonly associated with rap or sung vocals over dangdut, koplo, electronic, or trap-influenced arrangements. Although the combination of dangdut and hip-hop elements predates the term's wider circulation, the name gained broader public attention after the 2024 single "Garam & Madu (Sakit Dadaku)" by Tenxi, Jemsii, and Naykilla.

== History ==
The combination of hip-hop and dangdut developed before the popular use of the term hipdut. The style is connected to earlier experiments in dangdut that incorporated rap, disco, electronic beats, and regional performance styles. One of the best-known acts associated with the earlier development of hip-hop dangdut is NDX AKA, a Yogyakarta-based group formed in 2011 whose Javanese-language songs combine hip-hop, rap, and dangdut elements.

The term gained wider attention in late 2024 and early 2025 through "Garam & Madu (Sakit Dadaku)", released on 20 December 2024 by Tenxi, Jemsii, and Naykilla. The song blends dangdut, hip hop, and koplo, and became popular among younger listeners on social media platforms such as TikTok and YouTube. Michael Haryo Bagus Raditya, writing for Indonesia at Melbourne, described the song as part of a longer history of hip-dut within dangdut rather than as an entirely new genre, while also noting that its release became a significant moment in the revival of the style among Generation Z listeners.

The popularity of "Garam & Madu" also brought wider chart attention to the style. In January 2025, the song reached number one on the ASIRI Chart, shortly before the chart was rebranded as the Official Indonesia Chart as part of the Official Southeast Asia Charts initiative. Other songs were part of the same trend, including "Aku Dah Lupa" by Mikky and Zia.

In 2025, "Garam & Madu" received further media attention after winning the Best Production Work category at the Anugerah Musik Indonesia awards. The award coverage again linked the song to the growing public use of the term hip-dut.

== Characteristics ==
Hipdut mixes hip-hop rhythmic delivery and dangdut-derived melodic or rhythmic features. Its arrangements may include electronic beats, synthesizers, sampled or digitalised kendang patterns, and elements associated with koplo performance. In "Garam & Madu", hip-hop, house, and dangdut elements combine, with digitalised kendang-like sounds replacing the live percussion commonly associated with some forms of koplo.

The style has also been associated with multilingual lyrics and youth-oriented digital circulation. "Garam & Madu" attracted attention partly through its mixture of Indonesian, English, and Javanese lyrics and its spread through social media platforms.
