= List of number-one songs of 2024 (Singapore) =

This is a list of the Singapore Top 30 Digital Streaming number-one songs in 2024, according to the Recording Industry Association Singapore.

== Chart history ==
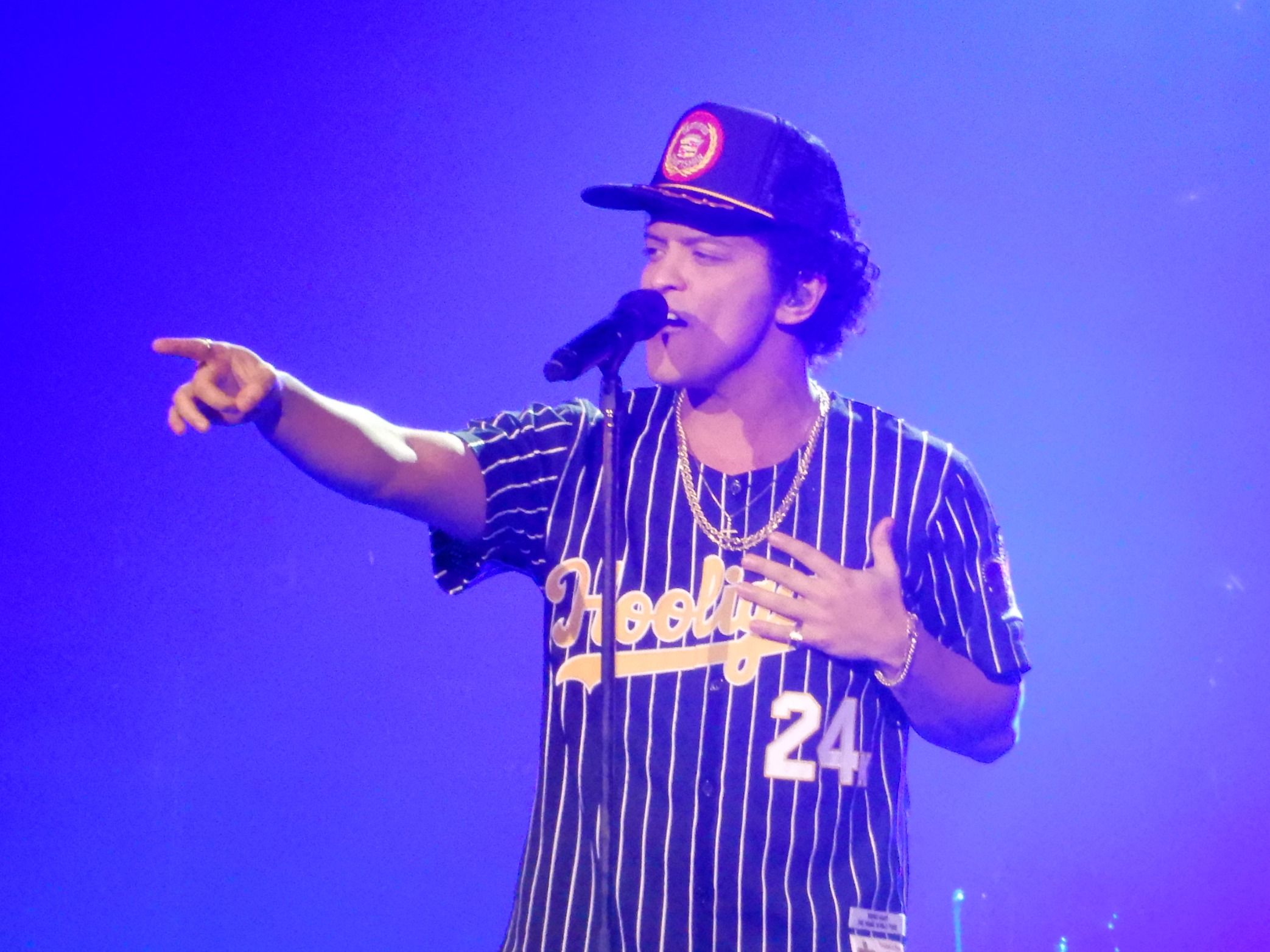
Bruno Mars earned the most weeks at number one in 2024, topping the chart for 19 weeks with "Die with a Smile" (with Lady Gaga) and "APT." (with Rosé).

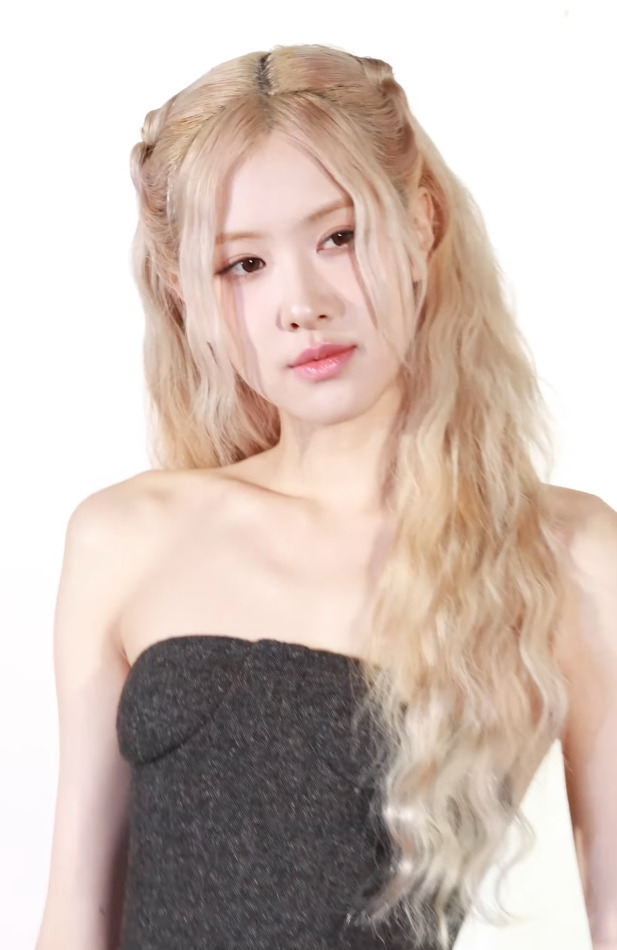
Rosé's song "APT." with Mars was the longest-running number-one song of the year, topping the chart for 10 weeks.

Issue Date	Song	Artist(s)	Ref.
4 January	"Seven"	Jungkook featuring Latto	
11 January	"Greedy"	Tate McRae	
18 January	"Yes, And?"	Ariana Grande	
25 January	"Viva la Vida"	Coldplay	
1 February	"Yellow"	Coldplay	
8 February	"Yellow"	Coldplay	
15 February	"Cruel Summer"	Taylor Swift	
22 February	"Cruel Summer"	Taylor Swift	
29 February	"Easy"	Le Sserafim	
7 March	"Cruel Summer"	Taylor Swift	
14 March	"Cruel Summer"	Taylor Swift	
21 March	"We Can't Be Friends (Wait for Your Love)"	Ariana Grande	
28 March	"We Can't Be Friends (Wait for Your Love)"	Ariana Grande	
4 April	"Magnetic"	Illit	
11 April	"Magnetic"	Illit	
18 April	"Magnetic"	Illit	
25 April	"Fortnight"	Taylor Swift feat. Post Malone	
2 May	"Fortnight"	Taylor Swift feat. Post Malone	
9 May	"Espresso"	Sabrina Carpenter	
16 May	"Espresso"	Sabrina Carpenter	
23 May	"Espresso"	Sabrina Carpenter	
30 May	"Espresso"	Sabrina Carpenter	
6 June	"Espresso"	Sabrina Carpenter	
13 June	"Espresso"	Sabrina Carpenter	
20 June	"Please Please Please"	Sabrina Carpenter	
27 June	"Please Please Please"	Sabrina Carpenter	
4 July	"Espresso"	Sabrina Carpenter	
11 July	"Birds of a Feather"	Billie Eilish	
18 July	"Birds of a Feather"	Billie Eilish	
25 July	"Birds of a Feather"	Billie Eilish	
1 August	"Who"	Jimin	
8 August	"Who"	Jimin	
15 August	"Who"	Jimin	
22 August	"Die with a Smile"	Lady Gaga and Bruno Mars	
29 August	"Die with a Smile"	Lady Gaga and Bruno Mars	
5 September	"Die with a Smile"	Lady Gaga and Bruno Mars	
12 September	"Die with a Smile"	Lady Gaga and Bruno Mars	
19 September	"Die with a Smile"	Lady Gaga and Bruno Mars	
26 September	"Die with a Smile"	Lady Gaga and Bruno Mars	
3 October	"Die with a Smile"	Lady Gaga and Bruno Mars	
10 October	"Die with a Smile"	Lady Gaga and Bruno Mars	
17 October	"Die with a Smile"	Lady Gaga and Bruno Mars	
24 October	"APT."	Rosé and Bruno Mars	
31 October	"APT."	Rosé and Bruno Mars	
7 November	"APT."	Rosé and Bruno Mars	
14 November	"APT."	Rosé and Bruno Mars	
21 November	"APT."	Rosé and Bruno Mars	
28 November	"APT."	Rosé and Bruno Mars	
5 December	"APT."	Rosé and Bruno Mars	
12 December	"APT."	Rosé and Bruno Mars	
19 December	"APT."	Rosé and Bruno Mars	
26 December	"APT."	Rosé and Bruno Mars	

== Number-one artists ==
List of number-one artists by total weeks at number one
Position	Artist	Weeks at No. 1
1	Bruno Mars	19
2	Rosé	10
3	Sabrina Carpenter	9
3	Lady Gaga	9
4	Taylor Swift	6
5	Coldplay	3
5	Ariana Grande	3
5	Billie Eilish	3
5	Jimin	3
6	Jungkook	1
6	Latto	1
6	Tate McRae	1
