= List of Billboard Pop Airplay number-one songs of 2025 =

This is a list of songs which reached number one on the Billboard Pop Airplay chart in 2025.

== Chart history ==
Key
| † | Indicates best-performing song of 2025 |

| Issue date | Song | Artist(s) | Ref. |
|---|---|---|---|
| January 4 | "Taste" | Sabrina Carpenter | |
| January 11 | "Taste" | Sabrina Carpenter | |
| January 18 | "Taste" | Sabrina Carpenter | |
| January 25 | "Taste" | Sabrina Carpenter | |
| February 1 | "APT." | Rosé and Bruno Mars | |
| February 8 | "APT." | Rosé and Bruno Mars | |
| February 15 | "APT." | Rosé and Bruno Mars | |
| February 22 | "APT." | Rosé and Bruno Mars | |
| March 1 | "APT." | Rosé and Bruno Mars | |
| March 8 | "Die with a Smile" † | Lady Gaga and Bruno Mars | |
| March 15 | "That's So True" | Gracie Abrams | |
| March 22 | "That's So True" | Gracie Abrams | |
| March 29 | "Bed Chem" | Sabrina Carpenter | |
| April 5 | "Bed Chem" | Sabrina Carpenter | |
| April 12 | "Pink Pony Club" | Chappell Roan | |
| April 19 | "Pink Pony Club" | Chappell Roan | |
| April 26 | "Pink Pony Club" | Chappell Roan | |
| May 3 | "Luther" | Kendrick Lamar and SZA | |
| May 10 | "Luther" | Kendrick Lamar and SZA | |
| May 17 | "Messy" | Lola Young | |
| May 24 | "Anxiety" | Doechii | |
| May 31 | "Anxiety" | Doechii | |
| June 7 | "Anxiety" | Doechii | |
| June 14 | "Anxiety" | Doechii | |
| June 21 | "Ordinary" | Alex Warren | |
| June 28 | "Ordinary" | Alex Warren | |
| July 5 | "Ordinary" | Alex Warren | |
| July 12 | "Ordinary" | Alex Warren | |
| July 19 | "Ordinary" | Alex Warren | |
| July 26 | "Ordinary" | Alex Warren | |
| August 2 | "Ordinary" | Alex Warren | |
| August 9 | "Ordinary" | Alex Warren | |
| August 16 | "Ordinary" | Alex Warren | |
| August 23 | "Ordinary" | Alex Warren | |
| August 30 | "Ordinary" | Alex Warren | |
| September 6 | "Manchild" | Sabrina Carpenter | |
| September 13 | "Ordinary" | Alex Warren | |
| September 20 | "Ordinary" | Alex Warren | |
| September 27 | "Ordinary" | Alex Warren | |
| October 4 | "Ordinary" | Alex Warren | |
| October 11 | "Ordinary" | Alex Warren | |
| October 18 | "Daisies" | Justin Bieber | |
| October 25 | "Daisies" | Justin Bieber | |
| November 1 | "Daisies" | Justin Bieber | |
| November 8 | "Golden" | Huntrix: Ejae, Audrey Nuna and Rei Ami | |
| November 15 | "Golden" | Huntrix: Ejae, Audrey Nuna and Rei Ami | |
| November 22 | "The Fate of Ophelia" | Taylor Swift | |
| November 29 | "The Fate of Ophelia" | Taylor Swift | |
| December 6 | "The Fate of Ophelia" | Taylor Swift | |
| December 13 | "Golden" | Huntrix: Ejae, Audrey Nuna and Rei Ami | |
| December 20 | "The Fate of Ophelia" | Taylor Swift | |
| December 27 | "The Fate of Ophelia" | Taylor Swift | |

== See also ==
- 2025 in American music
