= Garam & Madu (Sakit Dadaku) =

Single by Tenxi, Jemsii and Naykilla

from the album Puting Beliung
- Language: Indonesian; English; Javanese
- Released: 20 December 2024
- Genre: Trap; alt-pop; hipdut
- Length: 3:04
- Label: AntiNRML; The Orchard; HP Music; HP Record
- Songwriters: Joan Pasha Syahputra; James Yusufa Diraja Nugroho; Nayya Rahmania
- Producer: Jemsii

Tenxi singles chronology
| "Coba Lagi" (2024) | "Garam & Madu (Sakit Dadaku)" (2024) | "Kasih Aba-Aba" (2025) |

Jemsii singles chronology
| "Coba Lagi" (2024) | "Garam & Madu (Sakit Dadaku)" (2024) | "Kasih Aba-Aba" (2025) |

Naykilla singles chronology
| "Destroy You (Again)" (2024) | "Garam & Madu (Sakit Dadaku)" (2024) | "Kasih Aba-Aba" (2025) |

Music video
- "Garam & Madu (Sakit Dadaku)" on YouTube

"Garam & Madu (Sakit Dadaku)" (English: "Salt & Honey (My Chest Hurts)") is a song co-written and recorded by Indonesian singers Tenxi, Jemsii and Naykilla. It was released on 20 December 2024, on AntiNRML, The Orchard, HP Music and HP Record, as the second single from Tenxi and Jemsii's collaborative studio album Puting Beliung. The song tells about longing and doubt in a romantic relationship, describing how someone struggles to deal with conflicting feelings—sweet as honey, but also painful as salt.

== Background ==
"Garam & Madu (Sakit Dadaku)" has a hipdut feel, a blend of hip-hop and dangdut, with an energetic beat and a touch of electronic music. Joan Pasha Syahputra, James Yusufa Diraja Nugroho, and Nayya Rahmania are the writers of this song, while the aforementioned singers also act as songwriters.

== Critical response ==
"Garam & Madu (Sakit Dadaku)" has received positive response and has gone viral on various platforms such as TikTok and YouTube, where it has been viewed 200 million times. (Note: As of 5 September 2026.) The song has ranked at the top of the Official Indonesia Chart and Billboard Indonesia Songs chart.

== Charts ==
Weekly chart performance for "Garam & Madu (Sakit Dadaku)"
| Chart (2025) | Peak position |
|---|---|
| Indonesia (ASIRI) | 1 |
| Malaysia (IFPI) | 1 |

== Accolades ==
At the 28th annual Anugerah Musik Indonesia, "Garam & Madu (Sakit Dadaku)" won the Production Work of the Year, Best Record Producer and Best Sound Production Team categories.
