= Blue (Yung Kai song) =

Single by Yung Kai

from the album Stay with the Ocean, I'll Find You
- Released: August 2, 2024
- Genre: Indie-pop; doo-wop
- Length: 3:34
- Label: Flood Division; BMG
- Songwriter: Yung Kai
- Producer: Yung Kai

Yung Kai singles chronology
"Wildflower" (2024)	"Blue" (2024)	"Do You Think You Could Love Me?" (2025)

Music video
- "Blue" on YouTube

"Blue" is a song by Canadian singer Yung Kai from his debut studio album Stay with the Ocean, I'll Find You (2025). Released on August 2, 2024, the song went viral on TikTok and Instagram, layered over video montages of dreamy moments spent with a loved one. It had gathered more than one billion streams across various music platforms per June 4, 2025. The song became his breakthrough song, and subsequently achieved international acclaim by topping the chart in Indonesia and peaking at top ten in India, Malaysia, Philippines, and Singapore. A remix featuring Minnie was released on April 18, 2025.Yung Kai also released a Chinese version on July 3, 2026 by the name of ‘蓝’, which literally means blue.

== Background ==
"Blue" was inspired by the 2023 Chinese television series When I Fly Towards You. Yung Kai was binge-watching it on Discord with a girl he liked at the time and from the whole moment, he "put[s] up all of the built-up emotions he had together into the song." The song, estimated by Yung Kai himself, was completed within two weeks before being released.

== Composition ==
"Blue" was solely produced and written by Yung Kai himself. The song was composed in the key of E major, with a tempo of 97 beats per minute.

According to an interview with Genius, the first verse is about love at first sight. The chorus part, which invented the title "Blue" although not explicitly mentioned in the song, came from his interpretations of several elements that "sounds like blue" such as waves and ocean he mentioned "I'll nap under moonlight skies with you / I think I'll picture us, you with the waves / The ocean's colors on your face". Originally, the supposed chorus of the song was the current second verse, before he changed it since his friend who had initially heard the song '[wasn't] really feeling it'.

== Music video ==
The music video for "Blue" was released on December 12, 2024. Directed by Kenji K Chong, the music video shows Yung Kai, alongside his love interest (portrayed by Julia Ma) who represent the song's lyrics, living an ordinary cute love story; it was revealed at the end to be his imagination as the camera zooms out to Kai –now alone – staring out towards the open ocean. The twist at the end of the music video was proposed by Yung Kai himself, who also contributed on the planning and storyboarding.

== Live performances ==
Yung Kai performed the song on various festival in Asia, such as Pelupo Festival in Thailand, and Wanderland Music and Arts Festival in the Philippines. On March 17, 2025, he put on a performance of the song on Indonesian Idol Season 13.

== Track listing ==
- Digital download and streaming
1. "Blue" – 3:34
- Digital download and streaming – Shades of Blue
1. "Blue" (sped up) – 3:14
2. "Blue" (slowed down) – 3:54
3. "Blue" (mini version) – 1:32
4. "Blue" (instrumental) – 3:35
- Digital download and streaming – acoustics
1. "Blue" (acoustic) – 3:27
2. "Blue" (acoustic, sped up) – 3:02
3. "Blue" (acoustic, slowed down) – 3:52
4. "Blue" (acoustic, mini version) – 1:43
5. "Blue" (acoustic, instrumental) – 3:27
- Digital download and streaming – Minnie remix
1. "Blue" (with Minnie) – 3:33

== Charts ==
=== Weekly charts ===
Weekly chart performance for "Blue"
Chart (2024–2026)	Peak position
Canada Hot 100 (Billboard)	92
Global 200 (Billboard)	39
Hong Kong (Billboard)	12
India International (IMI)	2
Indonesia (ASIRI)	1
Malaysia (IFPI)	2
Philippines (IFPI)	4
Philippines Hot 100 (Billboard Philippines)	4
Singapore (RIAS)	3
South Korea (Circle)	134
Taiwan (Billboard)	13
Thailand (IFPI)	16
US Hot Rock & Alternative Songs (Billboard)	26
Vietnam (Vietnam Hot 100)	39

=== Monthly charts ===
Monthly chart performance for "Blue"
Chart (2025)	Position
South Korea (Circle)	139

=== Year-end charts ===
Year-end chart performance for "Blue"
Chart (2025)	Position
Global 200 (Billboard)	120
India International (IMI)	3
South Korea (Circle)	180
US Hot Rock & Alternative Songs (Billboard)	57

== Certifications ==
Certifications for "Blue"
Region	Certification	Certified units/sales
Canada (Music Canada)	Platinum	80,000^{‡}
New Zealand (RMNZ)	Gold	15,000^{‡}
United States (RIAA)	Gold	500,000^{‡}
^{‡} Sales+streaming figures based on certification alone.

== Release history ==
Release dates and formats for "Blue"
Region	Date	Format	Version	Label	Ref.
Various	August 2, 2024	Digital download; streaming	Original	Flood Division; BMG	
Various	August 2, 2024	Digital download; streaming	Shades of Blue	Flood Division; BMG	
Various	January 3, 2025	Digital download; streaming	Acoustic	Flood Division; BMG	
Various	April 18, 2025	Digital download; streaming	Minnie remix	Flood Division; BMG	
