= Fourtwnty =

Indonesian band

- Origin: Jakarta, Indonesia
- Genres: Acoustic, Folk-pop
- Years active: 2010–2025 (on hiatus)
- Labels: Indie Records
- Members: Ari Lesmana; Nuwi; Roby Satria; Andi Armand; Primandha Ridho; Ryan Maulana

Fourtwnty is an Indonesian folk-pop band formed in 2010. The band consists of musicians Ari Lesmana, Nuwi, Roby Satria, Andi Armand, Primandha Ridho and Ryan Maulana.

== History ==
Fourtwnty was formed in 2010 by Roby Satria who is also a member of Geisha. In 2015, the band released their debut studio album Lelaku. Fourtwnty's song "Zona Nyaman" was chosen as part of the soundtrack for the film Filosofi Kopi 2: Ben & Jody in 2017, and it was included in the band's second studio album Ego & fungsi otak. That album would be released the following year, which earned them the Indonesian Choice Award for Newcomer of the Year.

In 2023, Fourtwnty released their third studio album Nalar, which contains "Nematomorpha", nominated for the Anugerah Musik Indonesia for Best Pop Duo/Group. Another single "Mangu" (2022) became a sleeper hit; The song, in fact, found unexpected success starting from the first half of 2025 after their announcement regarding a break from the music scene, spending a whole month at the top of the Official Indonesia Chart and two weeks in the Malaysian chart.

== Discography ==
=== Studio albums ===
- 2015 – Lelaku
- 2018 – Ego & fungsi otak
- 2023 – Nalar

=== Live albums ===
- 2021 – Live at SRN: Pop Party

=== Singles ===
- 2019 – Kusut
- 2021 – Kursi goyang
- 2022 – Mangu (feat. Charita Utami)
