= Yung Kai =

Chinese-Canadian musician

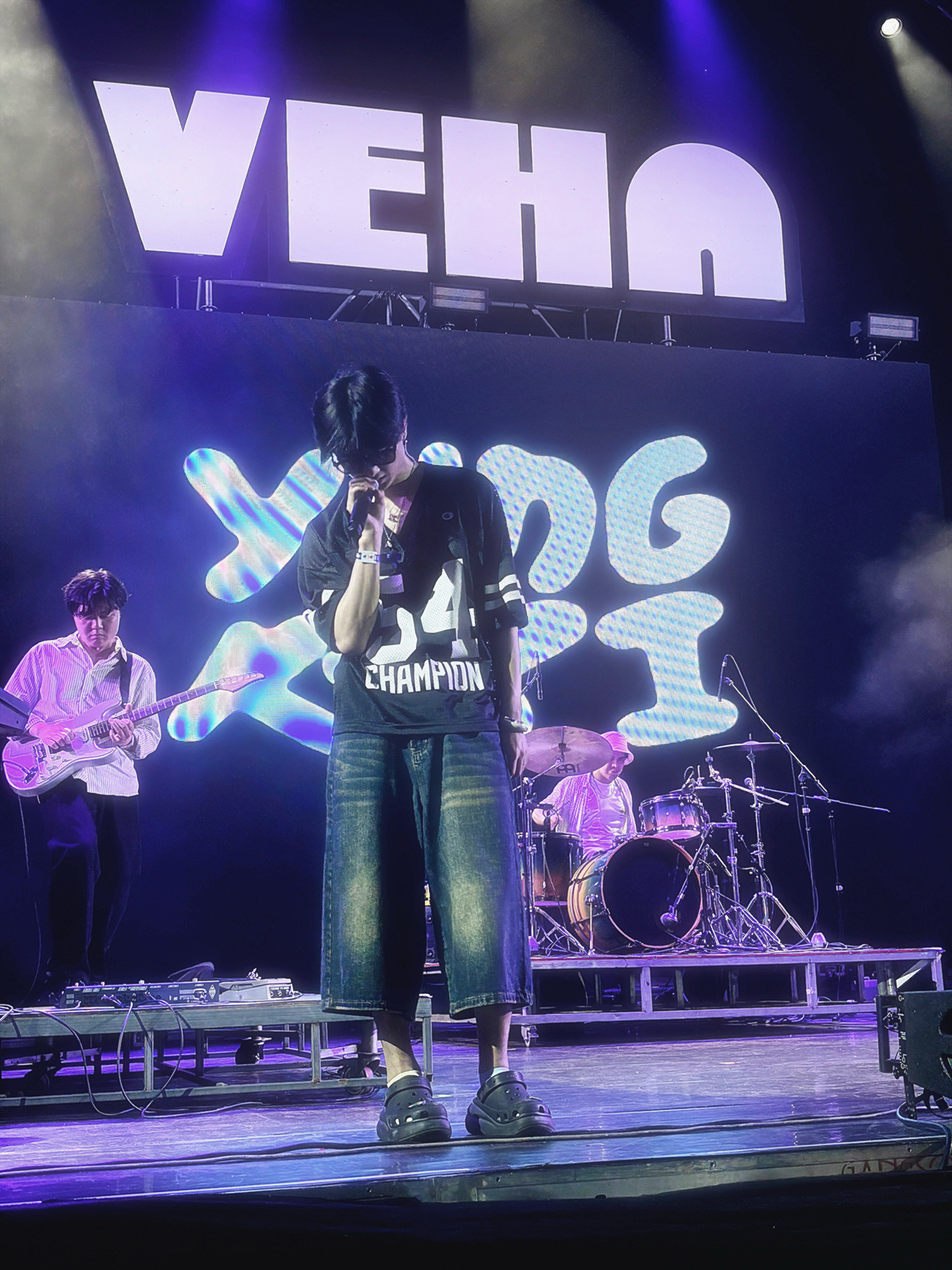
- Yung Kai at Pelupo Music Festival in 2025

Background information
- Born: Max Zhang; July 5, 2002 (age 24); Burnaby, British Columbia, Canada
- Genres: Bedroom pop; indie pop
- Years active: 2022–present
- Labels: Flood Division; BMG
- Website: www.yungkai.com

Max Zhang (born July 5, 2002), also known as Yung Kai (stylized in lowercase), is a Canadian singer and musician. He is known for his 2024 single "Blue", which went viral on TikTok and Instagram, peaking at 19 on the Billboard Global 200. It also reached the top 5 in the Philippines Hot 100 and Indonesia Songs editions of the chart, peaking at number one on the latter. He released his debut studio album Stay with the Ocean, I'll Find You, on September 26, 2025.

== Early life ==
Max Zhang was born in Burnaby, British Columbia, Canada. He grew up in Shanghai, China, but later moved back to Burnaby. His older brother influenced him to learn how to play the drums, piano, and guitar as a child; he also produced music on the side, creating beats for fun starting in 2018.

== Career ==
Yung Kai began singing in 2022, uploading covers of himself to TikTok, leading to collaborations with artists such as Bbno$. He received mainstream success in August 2024 when his single "Blue" went viral on TikTok and many other social media platforms, including Facebook and Instagram. He later became managed by the talent agency Wasserman.

In 2025, Yung Kai performed at Wanderland's tenth anniversary music festival. In April, he released a remix of "Blue" with Minnie. In July, he announced the Flower Moon and Star Tour, touring Asia, North America, and Europe. His debut studio album, Stay with the Ocean, I'll Find You, was released on September 26, 2025.

He received a Juno Award nomination for Breakthrough Artist or Group of the Year at the Juno Awards of 2026.

== Influences and artistry ==
Yung Kai is influenced by musicians Laufey, Keshi, Higher Brothers and Wave to Earth, whom he called his biggest inspiration. He was also inspired by rappers such as Juice Wrld, XXXTentacion, and Young Thug, despite his music being of a drastically different style. Yung Kai's music is created in his bedroom studio.

== Discography ==
=== Studio albums ===
List of studio albums, showing selected details
Title	Details
Stay with the Ocean, I'll Find You	Released: September 26, 2025; Label: Food Division, BMG; Formats: DL, streaming

=== Singles ===
List of singles, showing year released, selected chart positions, certifications, and album name
Title	Year	Peak chart positions									Certifications	Album
Title	Year	CAN	HK	IDN	KOR	MYS	PHL	SGP	THA	WW	Certifications	Album
"Listen to This When You're Down <3"	2022	—	—	—	—	—	—	—	—	—		Non-album single
"Wildflower"	2024	—	—	—	—	—	—	—	—	—		Stay with the Ocean, I'll Find You
"Blue"	2024	92	12	1	134	2	4	3	16	39	MC: Gold; RIAA: Gold	Stay with the Ocean, I'll Find You
"Do You Think You Could Love Me?"	2025	—	—	—	—	—	—	—	—	—		Stay with the Ocean, I'll Find You
"Where the Sunlight Glows" (with 88rising and Sunkis)	2025	—	—	—	—	—	—	—	—	—		Non-album single
"My Light"	2025	—	—	—	—	—	—	—	—	—		Stay with the Ocean, I'll Find You
"Flower"	2025	—	—	—	—	—	—	—	—	—		Stay with the Ocean, I'll Find You
"My Love My Love My Love"	2025	—	—	—	—	—	—	—	—	—		Stay with the Ocean, I'll Find You
"I Think of You the Most"	2026	—	—	—	—	—	—	—	—	—		Non-album single
"—" denotes releases that did not chart or were not released in that region.
