= Nadhif Basalamah =

Indonesian singer-songwriter (born 2000)

- Born: 30 May 2000 (age 26); Jakarta, Indonesia
- Occupation: Singer-songwriter
- Years active: 2018–present
- Musical career
- Genre: Pop
- Instruments: Vocals; guitar
- Labels: After School; Warner Music Indonesia

Nadhif Basalamah (born 30 May 2000) is an Indonesian singer-songwriter. He has released a studio album and an extended play. His 2023 single "Penjaga Hati" has topped the Billboard Indonesia Songs and Malaysia Songs charts.

== Career ==
Basalamah has been fond of singing since he was twelve, and he joined his school band in high school. After graduating from high school in 2018, he recorded several of his written songs. He released his debut single "After School Sad Session" in December 2018.

His debut extended play Wonder in Time was released in July 2022. It was preceded by singles "To Be With Me" and "Without Me (Sera)". In February 2023, he served as the opening act for Tulus for his concert tour Tur Manusia date in Makassar, South Sulawesi. In May 2023, Basalamah was selected as one of the ten artists in Spotify Indonesia Radar to showcase new artists globally.

In June 2023, he released his first single in Indonesian, "Penjaga Hati". It peaked at number one at the Billboard Indonesia Songs chart for seventeen non-consecutive weeks. It also topped the Malaysia Songs chart for five weeks. He released his debut studio album, Nadhif, in June 2024. He received his first Anugerah Musik Indonesia nomination for Best Male Pop Solo Act for "Jatuh Cinta Lagi" at the 27th ceremony.

== Discography ==
=== Studio albums ===
Title	Details
Nadhif	Released: 21 June 2024; Label: After School

=== Extended plays ===
Title	Details
Wonder in Time	Released: 13 July 2022; Label: After School

=== Singles ===
Title	Year	Album
"After School Sad Session"	2018	Non-album singles
"Bitterness"	2019	Non-album singles
"Spaces"	2019	Non-album singles
"Eventually"	2020	Wonder in Time
"Something More"	2021	Non-album singles
"Letting Go"	2021	Non-album singles
"To Be With Me"	2022	Wonder in Time
"Without Me (Sera)"	2022	Wonder in Time
"Never Let You Go" (featuring Laze)	2023	Non-album single
"Penjaga Hati"	2023	Nadhif
"Tiba-Tiba Jumat Lagi"	2024	Nadhif
"Sesuatu"	2024	Nadhif
"Isi Kepalaku"	2024	Nadhif
"Jatuh Cinta Lagi"	2024	Nadhif
"Bergema Sampai Selamanya" (solo or with Andi Rianto)	2025	Nadhif (Laman Berikutnya)
"Masih Ada Waktunya"	2025	Nadhif (Laman Berikutnya)
"Semoga Kau Bisa Maafkanku Beribu Kali"	2025	Nadhif (Laman Berikutnya)
"Kota Ini Tak Sama Tanpamu" (solo or with Aziz Harun & Aisha Retno)	2025	Nadhif (Laman Berikutnya)

== Awards and nominations ==
Award	Year	Category	Nominee(s)	Result	Ref.
Anugerah Musik Indonesia	2024	Best Male Pop Solo Act	"Jatuh Cinta Lagi"	Nominated	
