= Aliansi Industri Rekaman Musik Indonesia Bersatu =

Aliansi Industri Rekaman Musik Indonesia Bersatu (ASIRI) (English: Music Recording Industry Alliance of Indonesia) is a trust that represents the recording industry interests in Indonesia.

It was established in 1978 and represents 78 member labels, which distribute around 95% of the music sold in Indonesia.

== Certification levels ==
ASIRI is responsible for certifying gold and platinum albums in Indonesia. The levels are:

Domestic albums

- Gold: 15,000
- Platinum: 30,000

International albums

- Gold: 5,000
- Platinum: 10,000

As of 2016, ASIRI certifies Gold and Platinum based on the nominal of money earned from the sale of albums and singles, both physically and digitally.

- Gold: Rp500 million ($37,300)
- Platinum: Rp1 billion ($74,600)

== ASIRI Top Charts ==
Since 2023, ASIRI operates several record charts that rank the best-performing songs in Indonesia. The ASIRI Top Chart includes both the Top 50 Mixed Chart for the main chart and the Top 10 Indonesian Chart for domestic releases. Both of the charts are formulated by BMAT Music Innovators using streaming data from popular online music platforms such as Apple Music, Deezer, Spotify, and YouTube.

=== Number-one singles ===
- 2023
- 2024
- 2025
- 2026

== Repercussions of unauthorized recording ==
Copyright infringement is not a new phenomenon in Indonesia. Before 1988, all recordings sold in Indonesia were unauthorized. But in the 1990s, the number was reduced to 20%, with retail value of unlicensed recordings in 1995, estimated at US$15 million. In the early 2000s, the infringement rate was increased back to a higher levels, which was at 55% in 2001, and 85% in 2003. Usually, infringement affects domestic artists in particular.

== See also ==
- Music industry
- List of music recording certifications
