= Malaysia Songs =

Music chart in Malaysia

Malaysia Songs is a music record chart in the Malaysia, compiled by Billboard since February 2022. It is part of Billboard's Hits of the World chart collection, ranking the top 25 songs weekly in more than 40 countries around the globe.

The first number-one song on the chart was "Angel Baby" by Troye Sivan on the issue dated February 19, 2022. The current number-one song on the chart is "Hong Kong" by The Weeknd and Faye Wong.

== Methodology ==
The chart follows the Friday–Thursday reporting period, and will be updated each Tuesday morning (ET). The chart consist of 25 songs, ranked based on song consumption methodology — blending streams and sales — in Malaysia during the tracking period. All data are provided by Luminate Data, formerly MRC Data.

== List of number–one songs ==
2022 2023 2024 2025 2026

== Song milestones ==
=== Most weeks at number one ===
No. of weeks	Song	Artist	Year(s)	Source
18	"Golden"	Huntrix: Ejae, Audrey Nuna, and Rei Ami	2025	
15	"Die with a Smile"	Lady Gaga and Bruno Mars	2024–25	
14	"Seven"	Jungkook featuring Latto	2023	
11	"Kill Bill"	SZA	2022–23	
11	"Cupid"	Fifty Fifty	2023	
11	"Teh Hijau"	Tulus	2026	
10	"Glimpse of Us"	Joji	2022	
10	"Apt."	Rosé and Bruno Mars	2024–25	
10	"Risk It All"	Bruno Mars	2026	
8	"Angel Baby"	Troye Sivan	2022	
8	"Birds of a Feather"	Billie Eilish	2024	
8	"Like Jennie"	Jennie	2025	

=== Most weeks on the chart ===
No. of weeks	Song	Artist
124	"Die for You"	The Weeknd and Ariana Grande
105	"Die with a Smile"	Lady Gaga and Bruno Mars
96	"Until I Found You"	Stephen Sanchez
89	"Birds of a Feather"	Billie Eilish
88	"One of the Girls"	The Weeknd, Jennie and Lily-Rose Depp
85	"Seven"	Jungkook featuring Latto
83	"Kill Bill"	SZA
79	"Wildflower"	Billie Eilish
68	"Bergema Sampai Selamanya"	Nadhif Basalamah
64	"Drunk Text"	Henry Moodie

== Artist milestones ==
=== Most number-one songs ===
No. of songs	Artist	Songs	Source
4	The Weeknd	"Creepin'" "Die for You" "One of the Girls" "Hong Kong"	
3	Ariana Grande	"Die for You" "We Can't Be Friends (Wait for Your Love)" "Hate That I Made You Love Me"	
3	Blackpink	"Pink Venom" "Shut Down" "Jump"	
3	Bruno Mars	"Die with a Smile" "Apt." "Risk It All"	
3	Jennie	"You & Me" "One of the Girls" "Like Jennie"	
3	Taylor Swift	"Anti-Hero" "Fortnight" "The Fate of Ophelia"	
2	Aisha Retno	"Kota Ini Tak Sama Tanpamu" "Jodoh Lebaran"	
2	Joji	"Glimpse of Us" "Die for You"	
2	Jungkook	"Seven" "3D"	
2	Justin Bieber	"Ghost" "Beauty and a Beat"	
2	Nadhif Basalamah	"Penjaga Hati" "Kota Ini Tak Sama Tanpamu"	
2	Treasure	"Jikjin" "Darari"	

=== Most cumulative weeks at number one ===
No. of weeks	Artist
35	Bruno Mars
18	Huntrix: Ejae, Audrey Nuna, and Rei Ami
17	Jennie
16	Ariana Grande
15	Jungkook
15	Lady Gaga
14	Latto
14	The Weeknd
12	Joji
11	Fifty Fifty
11	Nadhif Basalamah
11	SZA
11	Tulus

=== Most top 10 singles ===
No. of songs	Artist	Source
11	Blackpink	
11	Taylor Swift	
10	Jennie	
9	BTS	
8	Justin Bieber	
8	NewJeans	
7	The Weeknd	
6	Ariana Grande	
6	Jungkook	
6	Le Sserafim	

=== Most chart entries ===
No. of songs	Artist	Source
44	Taylor Swift	
20	BTS	
13	Ariana Grande	
13	Blackpink	
13	Justin Bieber	
13	NewJeans	
12	The Weeknd	
10	Jennie	
10	Le Sserafim	
10	Lisa	
