= Tokyo (The Weeknd song) =

2026 song by The Weeknd

Song by the Weeknd and Yoko Takahashi
- Released: 2026
- Genre: Synth-pop
- Length: 3:10

"Tokyo" (also known as "Eva") is a song by Canadian singer and songwriter the Weeknd and Japanese singer Yoko Takahashi. It was premiered on September 19, 2026, at the Belluna Dome in Japan during his After Hours til Dawn Tour and samples "A Cruel Angel's Thesis", the opening theme song of Neon Genesis Evangelion, which was performed by Takahashi.

== History ==
The song was debuted live at the Weeknd's first show of his Asia tour, at the Belluna Dome in Saitama, Japan. He was joined by Takahashi on stage, with accompanying visuals from Yoko Taro. Takahashi then performed "A Cruel Angel's Thesis."

It is the second currently unreleased song tour, the first being "Rio" (featuring Anitta) and the third being "Hong Kong".

== Production ==
The song samples the instrumental of "A Cruel Angel's Thesis." It has been described as "the sort of grand synth-pop that the Weeknd excels at, with a pounding '80s-inspired drum machine that places the song on a booming car sound system, rushing through the city lights."
