= List of number-one songs of 2024 (Malaysia) =

== RIM streaming charts ==
Below is a list of songs that topped the RIM charts in 2024 according to the Recording Industry Association of Malaysia.

Issue Date	International songs			Malay songs			Chinese songs		
Issue Date	Song	Artist(s)	Ref.	Song	Artist(s)	Ref.	Song	Artist(s)	Ref.
4 January	"One of the Girls"	The Weeknd, Jennie, and Lily-Rose Depp		"Gelora"	Usop		"聖誕星"	Jay Chou featuring Gary Yang	
11 January	"One of the Girls"	The Weeknd, Jennie, and Lily-Rose Depp		"Gelora"	Usop		"如果可以"	William Wei	
18 January	"One of the Girls"	The Weeknd, Jennie, and Lily-Rose Depp		"Gelora"	Usop		"如果可以"	William Wei	
25 January	"One of the Girls"	The Weeknd, Jennie, and Lily-Rose Depp		"Gelora"	Usop		"如果可以"	William Wei	
1 February	"One of the Girls"	The Weeknd, Jennie, and Lily-Rose Depp		"Gelora"	Usop		"如果可以"	William Wei	
8 February	"One of the Girls"	The Weeknd, Jennie, and Lily-Rose Depp		"Gelora"	Usop		"Happy龙龙Way"	Astro Artiste	
15 February	"Drunk Text"	Henry Moodie		"Angau"	Fahimi		"周星翅"	Steady Gang	
22 February	"Drunk Text"	Henry Moodie		"SAH"	Sarah Suhairi and Alfie Zumi		"周星翅"	Steady Gang	
29 February	"Drunk Text"	Henry Moodie		"SAH"	Sarah Suhairi and Alfie Zumi		"周星翅"	Steady Gang	
7 March	"Drunk Text"	Henry Moodie		"SAH"	Sarah Suhairi and Alfie Zumi		"周星翅"	Steady Gang	
14 March	"We Can't Be Friends (Wait for Your Love)"	Ariana Grande		"SAH"	Sarah Suhairi and Alfie Zumi		"周星翅"	Steady Gang	
21 March	"We Can't Be Friends (Wait for Your Love)"	Ariana Grande		"SAH"	Sarah Suhairi and Alfie Zumi		"如果可以"	William Wei	
28 March	"We Can't Be Friends (Wait for Your Love)"	Ariana Grande		"SAH"	Sarah Suhairi and Alfie Zumi		"如果可以"	William Wei	
4 April	"We Can't Be Friends (Wait for Your Love)"	Ariana Grande		"SAH"	Sarah Suhairi and Alfie Zumi		"在加納共和國離婚"	Dior大穎 and Firdhaus	
11 April	"Magnetic"	Illit		"Suasana Di Hari Raya"	Anuar and Ellina		"在加納共和國離婚"	Dior大穎 and Firdhaus	
18 April	"Magnetic"	Illit		"Alamak Raya Lagi"	De Fam		"友谊长存"	Firdhaus	
25 April	"Fortnight"	Taylor Swift featuring Post Malone		"Alamak Raya Lagi"	De Fam		"友谊长存"	Firdhaus	
2 May	"Magnetic"	Illit		"Masing Masing"	Ernie Zakri and Ade Govinda		"友谊长存"	Firdhaus	
9 May	"Drunk Text"	Henry Moodie		"Masing Masing"	Ernie Zakri and Ade Govinda		"友谊长存"	Firdhaus	
16 May	"Drunk Text"	Henry Moodie		"Masing Masing"	Ernie Zakri and Ade Govinda		"在加納共和國離婚"	Dior大穎 and Firdhaus	
23 May	"Drunk Text"	Henry Moodie		"Masing Masing"	Ernie Zakri and Ade Govinda		"在加納共和國離婚"	Dior大穎 and Firdhaus	
30 May	"Espresso"	Sabrina Carpenter		"Masing Masing"	Ernie Zakri and Ade Govinda		"在加納共和國離婚"	Dior大穎 and Firdhaus	
6 June	"Espresso"	Sabrina Carpenter		"Masing Masing"	Ernie Zakri and Ade Govinda		"在加納共和國離婚"	Dior大穎 and Firdhaus	
13 June	"Espresso"	Sabrina Carpenter		"Masing Masing"	Ernie Zakri and Ade Govinda		"在加納共和國離婚"	Dior大穎 and Firdhaus	
20 June	"Espresso"	Sabrina Carpenter		"Masing Masing"	Ernie Zakri and Ade Govinda		"在加納共和國離婚"	Dior大穎 and Firdhaus	
27 June	"Birds of a Feather"	Billie Eilish		"Masing Masing"	Ernie Zakri and Ade Govinda		"在加納共和國離婚"	Dior大穎 and Firdhaus	
4 July	"Birds of a Feather"	Billie Eilish		"Masing Masing"	Ernie Zakri and Ade Govinda		"在加納共和國離婚"	Dior大穎 and Firdhaus	
11 July	"Birds of a Feather"	Billie Eilish		"Masing Masing"	Ernie Zakri and Ade Govinda		"能遇見, 就很不錯了"	Firdhaus	
18 July	"Birds of a Feather"	Billie Eilish		"Masing Masing"	Ernie Zakri and Ade Govinda		"能遇見, 就很不錯了"	Firdhaus	
25 July	"Birds of a Feather"	Billie Eilish		"Masing Masing"	Ernie Zakri and Ade Govinda		"能遇見, 就很不錯了"	Firdhaus	
1 August	"Birds of a Feather"	Billie Eilish		"Masing Masing"	Ernie Zakri and Ade Govinda		"能遇見, 就很不錯了"	Firdhaus	
8 August	"Birds of a Feather"	Billie Eilish		"Masing Masing"	Ernie Zakri and Ade Govinda		"在加納共和國離婚"	Dior大穎 and Firdhaus	
15 August	"Birds of a Feather"	Billie Eilish		"Masing Masing"	Ernie Zakri and Ade Govinda		"在加納共和國離婚"	Dior大穎 and Firdhaus	
22 August	"Birds of a Feather"	Billie Eilish		"Masing Masing"	Ernie Zakri and Ade Govinda		"在加納共和國離婚"	Dior大穎 and Firdhaus	
29 August	"Die with a Smile"	Lady Gaga and Bruno Mars		"Masing Masing"	Ernie Zakri and Ade Govinda		"在加納共和國離婚"	Dior大穎 and Firdhaus	
5 September	"Die with a Smile"	Lady Gaga and Bruno Mars		"Masing Masing"	Ernie Zakri and Ade Govinda		"能遇見, 就很不錯了"	Firdhaus	
12 September	"Die with a Smile"	Lady Gaga and Bruno Mars		"Masing Masing"	Ernie Zakri and Ade Govinda		"能遇見, 就很不錯了"	Firdhaus	
19 September	"Die with a Smile"	Lady Gaga and Bruno Mars		"Masing Masing"	Ernie Zakri and Ade Govinda		"能遇見, 就很不錯了"	Firdhaus	
26 September	"Die with a Smile"	Lady Gaga and Bruno Mars		"Masing Masing"	Ernie Zakri and Ade Govinda		"能遇見, 就很不錯了"	Firdhaus	
3 October	"Die with a Smile"	Lady Gaga and Bruno Mars		"Masing Masing"	Ernie Zakri and Ade Govinda		"在加納共和國離婚"	Dior大穎 and Firdhaus	
10 October	"Die with a Smile"	Lady Gaga and Bruno Mars		"Reminisensi"	Insomniacks		"在加納共和國離婚"	Dior大穎 and Firdhaus	
17 October	"Die with a Smile"	Lady Gaga and Bruno Mars		"Reminisensi"	Insomniacks		"在加納共和國離婚"	Dior大穎 and Firdhaus	
24 October	"APT."	Rosé and Bruno Mars		"Reminisensi"	Insomniacks		"在加納共和國離婚"	Dior大穎 and Firdhaus	
31 October	"APT."	Rosé and Bruno Mars		"Reminisensi"	Insomniacks		"在加納共和國離婚"	Dior大穎 and Firdhaus	
7 November	"APT."	Rosé and Bruno Mars		"Reminisensi"	Insomniacks		"在加納共和國離婚"	Dior大穎 and Firdhaus	
14 November	"APT."	Rosé and Bruno Mars		"Reminisensi"	Insomniacks		"在加納共和國離婚"	Dior大穎 and Firdhaus	
21 November	"APT."	Rosé and Bruno Mars		"Reminisensi"	Insomniacks		"在加納共和國離婚"	Dior大穎 and Firdhaus	
28 November	"APT."	Rosé and Bruno Mars		"Reminisensi"	Insomniacks		"在加納共和國離婚"	Dior大穎 and Firdhaus	
5 December	"APT."	Rosé and Bruno Mars		"Reminisensi"	Insomniacks		"在加納共和國離婚"	Dior大穎 and Firdhaus	
12 December	"APT."	Rosé and Bruno Mars		"Reminisensi"	Insomniacks		"在加納共和國離婚"	Dior大穎 and Firdhaus	
19 December	"APT."	Rosé and Bruno Mars		"Reminisensi"	Insomniacks		"在加納共和國離婚"	Dior大穎 and Firdhaus	
26 December	"APT."	Rosé and Bruno Mars		"Reminisensi"	Insomniacks		"在加納共和國離婚"	Dior大穎 and Firdhaus	

== Billboard Malaysia Songs ==
Malaysia Songs is a record chart in Malaysia for songs, compiled by Billboard since February 2022. The chart is updated every Tuesday on Billboard's website. The chart ranks the top 25 songs weekly in Malaysia.

The chart tracks songs' performance from Friday to Thursday. Chart rankings are based on digital downloads from full-service digital music retailers (sales from direct-to-consumer sites such as an individual artist's store are excluded) and online streaming occurring in Malaysia during the tracking period. All data are provided by MRC Data.

Issue date	Song	Artist(s)	Ref.
6 January	"Penjaga Hati"	Nadhif Basalamah	
13 January	"One of the Girls"	The Weeknd, Jennie, and Lily-Rose Depp	
20 January	"One of the Girls"	The Weeknd, Jennie, and Lily-Rose Depp	
27 January	"Penjaga Hati"	Nadhif Basalamah	
3 February	"One of the Girls"	The Weeknd, Jennie, and Lily-Rose Depp	
10 February	"One of the Girls"	The Weeknd, Jennie, and Lily-Rose Depp	
17 February	"One of the Girls"	The Weeknd, Jennie, and Lily-Rose Depp	
24 February	"Good Luck One Dragon"	(Malaysia) 3P, Nancy Sit Ka Yin, and Jaspers Lai	
2 March	"Drunk Text"	Henry Moodie	
9 March	"SAH (Setia-Akhir-Hayat)"	(Malaysia) Sarah Suhairi and Alfie Zumi	
16 March	"SAH (Setia-Akhir-Hayat)"	(Malaysia) Sarah Suhairi and Alfie Zumi	
23 March	"We Can't Be Friends (Wait for Your Love)"	Ariana Grande	
30 March	"We Can't Be Friends (Wait for Your Love)"	Ariana Grande	
6 April	"We Can't Be Friends (Wait for Your Love)"	Ariana Grande	
13 April	"We Can't Be Friends (Wait for Your Love)"	Ariana Grande	
20 April	"Suasana Hari Raya"	(Malaysia) Anuar & Ellina	
27 April	"Magnetic"	Illit	
4 May	"Fortnight"	Taylor Swift featuring Post Malone	
11 May	"Magnetic"	Illit	
18 May	"Drunk Text"	Henry Moodie	
25 May	"Drunk Text"	Henry Moodie	
1 June	"Espresso"	Sabrina Carpenter	
8 June	"Espresso"	Sabrina Carpenter	
15 June	"Espresso"	Sabrina Carpenter	
22 June	"Espresso"	Sabrina Carpenter	
29 June	"Espresso"	Sabrina Carpenter	
6 July	"Birds of a Feather"	Billie Eilish	
13 July	"Rockstar"	Lisa	
20 July	"Birds of a Feather"	Billie Eilish	
27 July	"Birds of a Feather"	Billie Eilish	
3 August	"Birds of a Feather"	Billie Eilish	
10 August	"Birds of a Feather"	Billie Eilish	
17 August	"Birds of a Feather"	Billie Eilish	
24 August	"Birds of a Feather"	Billie Eilish	
31 August	"Birds of a Feather"	Billie Eilish	
7 September	"Die with a Smile"	Lady Gaga and Bruno Mars	
14 September	"Die with a Smile"	Lady Gaga and Bruno Mars	
21 September	"Die with a Smile"	Lady Gaga and Bruno Mars	
28 September	"Die with a Smile"	Lady Gaga and Bruno Mars	
5 October	"Die with a Smile"	Lady Gaga and Bruno Mars	
12 October	"Die with a Smile"	Lady Gaga and Bruno Mars	
19 October	"Die with a Smile"	Lady Gaga and Bruno Mars	
26 October	"Die with a Smile"	Lady Gaga and Bruno Mars	
2 November	"APT."	Rosé and Bruno Mars	
9 November	"APT."	Rosé and Bruno Mars	
16 November	"APT."	Rosé and Bruno Mars	
23 November	"APT."	Rosé and Bruno Mars	
30 November	"APT."	Rosé and Bruno Mars	
7 December	"APT."	Rosé and Bruno Mars	
14 December	"APT."	Rosé and Bruno Mars	
21 December	"APT."	Rosé and Bruno Mars	
28 December	"APT."	Rosé and Bruno Mars	
