= List of best-selling singles in Brazil =

This is a list of best-selling singles in Brazil, divided into the singles with the most certified units by the Pro-Música Brasil (previously known as ABPD), and the singles with the most claimed sales.

== List of best-selling singles ==
=== Claimed physical units ===
| Year | Artist | Title | Sales |
|---|---|---|---|
| 1990 | Leandro & Leonardo | "Pense em Mim" | 3,000,000 |
| 1991 | Leandro & Leonardo | "Paz na Cama" | 1,500,000 |
| 1982 | Dalto | "Muito Estranho" | 1,000,000 |
| 2000 | É o Tchan! | "Pau Que Nasce Torto / Melô do Tchan" | 1,000,000 |
| 1989 | Kaoma | "Lambada" | 700,000 |
| 1983 | Ritchie | "Menina Veneno" | 700,000 |
| 1987 | Roberta Miranda | "Eterno chorar" | 600,000 |
| 1979 | As Melidnrosas | "Está Proibido Beijar As Melindrosas" | 500,000 |
| 1982 | Blitz | "Você Não Soube Me Amar" | 500,000 |
| 1973 | Júnior | "Me Perdoe" | 500,000 |
| 1980 | Nikka Costa | "Out Here on My Own" | 500,000 |
| 2001 | Gilmelândia | "Maionese" | 500,000 |

=== Highest-certified singles ===
Highest certified singles in Brazil^{‡} (as of 2026)
| Year | Artist | Title | Certified sales |
|---|---|---|---|
| 2017 | Luis Fonsi and Daddy Yankee | "Despacito" | 4,000,000 |
| 2023 | Marília Mendonça | "Leão" | 3,600,000 |
| 2011 | Rihanna | "We Found Love" | 3,500,000 |
| 2019 | Marília Mendonça | "Supera" | 3,000,000 |
| 2020 | Marília Mendonça | "Bebi Liguei" | 2,700,000 |
| 2021 | Marília Mendonça & Maiara & Maraisa | "Esqueça-Me Se For Capaz" | 2,700,000 |
| 2019 | Marília Mendonça | "Troca de Calçada" | 2,700,000 |
| 2020 | Marília Mendonça | "Graveto" | 2,700,000 |
| 2014 | Mundo Bita | "Fazendinha" | 2,500,000 |
| 2014 | Mundo Bita | "Viajar Pelo Safari" | 2,500,000 |
| 2012 | Psy | "Gangnam Style" | 2,500,000 |
| 2020 | Marília Mendonça | "Todo Mundo Vai Sofrer" | 2,400,000 |
| 2015 | Ellie Goulding | "Love Me like You Do" | 2,250,000 |
| 2021 | Marília Mendonça & Maiara & Maraisa | "Todo Mundo Menos Você" | 2,100,000 |
| 2021 | Marília Mendonça & Maiara & Maraisa | "Presepada" | 2,100,000 |
| 2020 | Marília Mendonça | "Bem Pior Que Eu" | 2,100,000 |
| 2013 | Katy Perry | "Dark Horse" | 2,000,000 |
| 2016 | Matheus & Kauan | "Quem Me Dera" | 2,000,000 |
| 2017 | Mundo Bita | "Esplêndida Fauna" | 2,000,000 |
| 2021 | Marília Mendonça & Maiara & Maraisa | "Coração Bandido" | 1,800,000 |
| 2024 | Lady Gaga & Bruno Mars | "Die with a Smile" | 1,760,000 |
| 2022 | Harry Styles | "As It Was" | 1,600,000 |
| 2013 | Avicii | "Wake Me Up" | 1,500,000 |
| 2020 | Israel & Rodolffo | "Batom de Cereja" | 1,500,000 |
| 2019 | Matheus & Kauan | "Vou Ter Que Superar" | 1,500,000 |
| 2017 | MC Fioti | "Bum Bum Tam Tam" | 1,500,000 |
| 2019 | The Weeknd | "Blinding Lights" | 1,440,000 |
| 2018 | Lady Gaga & Bradley Cooper | "Shallow" | 1,280,000 |
| 2019 | Felipe Araújo | "Atrasdinha - Ao Vivo No Rio De Janeiro" | 1,200,000 |
| 2022 | Hugo & Guilherme & Marilia Mendonça | "Mal Feito" | 1,200,000 |
| 2018 | Lauana Prado | "Cobaia" | 1,200,000 |
| 2018 | Matheus & Kauan | "Ao Vico Em A Cores" | 1,200,000 |
| 2023 | The Weeknd, Jennie & Lily-Rose Depp | "One of the Girls" | 1,120,000 |
| 2024 | Billie Eilish | "Birds of a Feather" | 1,120,000 |
| 2019 | Ariana Grande | "7 Rings" | 960,000 |
| 2019 | Billie Eilish | "Bad Guy" | 960,000 |
| 2024 | Sabrina Carpenter | "Espresso" | 960,000 |
| 2019 | Marília Mendonça | "Apaixonadinha" | 900,000 |
| 2020 | Marília Mendonça | "Bebaça" | 900,000 |
| 2019 | Marília Mendonça | "Ciumeira" | 900,000 |
| 2019 | Marília Mendonça | "Eu sei de cor" | 900,000 |
| 2019 | Marília Mendonça | "Sem Sal" | 900,000 |
| 2019 | Marília Mendonça | "Serenata" | 900,000 |
| 2024 | Billie Eilish | "Wildflower" | 800,000 |
| 2010 | Adele | "Rolling in the Deep" | 750,000 |
| 2017 | The Chainsmokers & Coldplay | "Something Just Like This" | 750,000 |
| 2016 | Ariana Grande | "Side to Side" | 750,000 |
| 2016 | Justin Timberlake | "Can't Stop the Feeling!" | 750,000 |
| 2010 | Shakira | "Waka Waka (This Time for Africa)" | 750,000 |
| 2010 | Shakira | "Chantaje" | 750,000 |
| 2020 | Ariana Grande | "Positions" | 640,000 |
| 2018 | Lady Gaga | "Always Remember Us This Way" | 640,000 |
| 2019 | Marília Mendonça | "Infiel" | 600,000 |
| 2018 | Marília Mendonça | "Amante não tem lar" | 600,000 |
| 2020 | Marília Mendonça | "Bem pior que eu" | 600,000 |
| 2020 | Marília Mendonça | "Passa Mal" | 600,000 |
| 2020 | Marília Mendonça | "Quero você do jeito que quiser" | 600,000 |

== See also ==
- List of best-selling albums in Brazil
- List of best-selling singles by country
