= Pense em Mim =

Single by Leandro e Leonardo

from the album Leandro e Leonardo Vol.4
- Released: 1990
- Recorded: January 1990
- Studio: Chantecler (São Paulo, Brazil)
- Genre: Sertanejo
- Length: 3:19
- Label: Chantecler
- Songwriters: Douglas Maio; José Ribeiro; Mario Soares
- Producer: César Augusto

Leandro e Leonardo singles chronology
"Talismã" (1990)	"Pense em Mim" (1990)	"Desculpe, Mas Eu Vou Chorar" (1991)

Pense em Mim (Think of Me) is a song written by Douglas Maio, José Ribeiro and Mario Soares and recorded by the Brazilian sertanejo music duo Leandro e Leonardo on their fourth studio album Leandro e Leonardo Vol.4.

With an arrangement that uses the synthesizer to reproduce strings and brass, the recording opens with a 16-bar saxophone solo, followed by the simple structure of the song: part A, chorus, part B, repeat the introduction, part B, chorus, repeat the chorus. Both in its instrumentation and theme, "Pense em Mim" shows an adaptation of the sertanejo music style to the taste of the urban public, in an attempt to dissociate the duo from the rural world and expand its reach.

The strategy was successful: released together with the album, in January 1990, "Pense em Mim" was one of the duo's biggest hits, reaching sixth place on the national charts. The CD sold more than 2.85 million copies in Brazil.

In the early 1990s, the song was covered by the rock band Patrulha 66. Later, it would also be covered by artists such as Hebe Camargo (on the CD Pra Você, from 1998), Marília Pêra (on Estrela Tropical, from 2000, in a medley with "Que Raio de Amor é Esse?") and Olivia Byington (Perto, from 2009).

== See also ==
- List of best-selling singles in Brazil
