= One of the Girls =

2023 single by the Weeknd, Jennie, and Lily-Rose Depp

Single by the Weeknd, Jennie and Lily-Rose Depp

from the EP The Idol Episode 4 (Music from the HBO Original Series)
- A-side: "Popular" (double A-side)
- Released: December 8, 2023
- Genre: R&B
- Length: 4:04
- Label: XO; Republic
- Songwriters: Abel Tesfaye; Lily-Rose Depp; Mike Dean; Ramsey; Sam Levinson
- Producers: The Weeknd; Mike Dean

The Weeknd singles chronology
"Another One of Me" (2023)	"One of the Girls" (2023)	"Young Metro" (2024)

Jennie singles chronology
"You & Me" (2023)	"One of the Girls" (2023)	"Slow Motion" (2024)

Lily-Rose Depp singles chronology
"One of the Girls" (2023)

Music video
- "One of the Girls" on YouTube

"One of the Girls" is a song by Canadian singer the Weeknd, South Korean singer and rapper Jennie, and French-American actress and singer Lily-Rose Depp. It was released on December 8, 2023, through XO and Republic Records, as a single from The Idol Episode 4 (Music from the HBO Original Series) (2023), an EP of music from the fourth episode of the HBO television series The Idol, which stars the three singers. The song was also included on the 2024 deluxe version of the Weeknd's greatest hits album The Highlights (2021).

"One of the Girls" is a synth-driven R&B track featuring a blend of subtle synths, deep bass, and trap-inspired elements. It was written by the Weeknd, Lily-Rose Depp, Ramsey, Sam Levinson, and producer Mike Dean. The song relates to the storyline of The Idol and addresses themes of control, fame, desire, and Stockholm syndrome. It received a mixed reception from critics, who praised the vocals, seductive feel, and production, but criticized the explicit lyrics.

A sleeper hit, the song saw a surge in popularity after going viral on video sharing platform TikTok and subsequently peaked at number ten on the Billboard Global 200. The song reached number one in Malaysia and the top ten in Greece, Hungary, India, Indonesia, Latvia, Lithuania, MENA, Singapore, UAE, and Vietnam. In the United States, it became the highest-charting song by a female K-pop soloist on the Billboard Hot 100, peaking at number 51, and the first to be certified platinum by the Recording Industry Association of America (RIAA). The Weeknd performed "One of the Girls" on the After Hours til Dawn Tour as well as his Spotify Billions Club Live concert, while Jennie joined him for one performance on the tour and also performed the song at several festivals.

== Background and release ==
In 2023, Abel Tesfaye, known as the Weeknd, starred in and co-created a drama series for HBO entitled The Idol, which also starred actress Lily-Rose Depp and singer Jennie of South Korean girl group Blackpink. Tesfaye initially announced a soundtrack album would accompany the show entitled The Idol, Vol. 1, which was later repurposed into individual EPs of music from each episode. A collaboration between the Weeknd and Jennie for the soundtrack was first teased on May 10 at a launch party for Jennie's Calvin Klein capsule collection. At the event, Jennie and DJ duo Simi and Haze Khadra played a snippet of the unreleased track, dubbing it a "special song". Jennie also reposted an Instagram story by Dazed Korea recording her playing the snippet and added tags for The Idol and the Weeknd. Similarly, the Khadra sisters reshared clips of the song on their Instagram, tagging Jennie, the Weeknd and The Idol.

The collaboration was confirmed by Tesfaye on June 20 in a post responding to a troll on Twitter, in which he stated he would be "dropping that Jennie song this weekend". On June 21, he officially announced the fourth EP of music from the show, The Idol Episode 4 (Music from the HBO Original Series), would be released the following night. In the announcement, he revealed the EP's cover art and track listing, which confirmed the song's title as "One of the Girls" and its performers as the Weeknd, Jennie, and Lily-Rose Depp. The track marks Jennie's first solo music release since "Solo" (2018) and Depp's second song for The Idol after "World Class Sinner / I'm a Freak". It was released on June 23, 2023, for digital download and streaming, alongside the rest of the EP. It was officially released as a single on December 8 alongside sped up, slowed, instrumental, and a capella versions of the song. The song was sent to US rhythmic contemporary radio on December 12, and was released as a 7-inch vinyl on June 14, 2024. It was also included on the deluxe edition of the Weeknd's greatest hits album The Highlights, which was released on February 9, 2024.

== Composition and lyrics ==
"One of the Girls"
A 24-second sample of "One of the Girls" where the pre-chorus sung by Jennie and the beginning of the chorus from Lily-Rose Depp are heard.

"One of the Girls" was written by its producer Mike Dean alongside Abel Tesfaye, Lily-Rose Depp, Ramsey, and Sam Levinson. It is described as a "down-tempo" and R&B track, built around "synthy, serpentine beat". The song has a "seductive feel," featuring subtle synths, bass, and a trap style that complements the lyrics. Lyrically, it deals with "emotionally harrowing" themes of "control, fame, desire and Stockholm syndrome." It ties into the plot of The Idol, which depicts the intimate relationship between the pop star Jocelyn (portrayed by Depp) and the cult leader Tedros (portrayed by Tesfaye). Jennie lends her voice to the song's introduction and bridge, including the lyrics "Lock me up and throw away the key / He knows how to get the best out of me." Tesfaye and Depp trade verses for the remainder of the song about BDSM and choking. Depp says, "Hands on my neck while you push it up," while Tesfaye sings, "Force me and choke me 'til I pass out." In the chorus, Depp explains that she wants to be "one of your girls tonight."

== Critical reception ==
The song was met with mixed reviews from music critics. Filmfare praised the production and vocals of "One of the Girls", stating that the song has a "seductive feel with subtle synths, powerful bass, and an impressive trap style that complements the lyrics." Additionally, they opined that the Weeknd's signature voice "compliments Jennie's breathy vocals and Lily-Rose Depp's rich and lovely voice." Steffanee Wang of Nylon described the beat as "decadently plush" and noted that the explicit lyrics work better in the context of music rather than in the show. On the vocals, she found that "the different tones of their voices weave harmoniously like a braid" and in particular praised Jennie for highlighting her voice in a different context with her first foray into R&B, saying the song is "the most sensual, desperate, and emotive she's ever sounded." However, Zoe Guy of Vulture criticized the song's "eyebrow-scratching lyrics", arguing that it "manages to commit the carnal sin of making sex boring." Writing for Pitchfork, Julianne Escobedo Shepherd felt that for a first-time singer Lily-Rose Depp's "light rasp is believable" and agreed that the song "can't be saved even by Blackpink's Jennie."

== Commercial performance ==
"One of the Girls" gradually emerged as one of the best-performing tracks from The Idol's soundtrack. In the United States, the song debuted at number 14 on the Hot R&B Songs chart on July 8, 2023, with 2.5 million streams and 1,000 downloads sold in its opening week. It also debuted at number 11 on R&B Digital Song Sales and number 19 on R&B/Hip-Hop Digital Song Sales. Lily-Rose Depp made her first appearance on a Billboard chart with this. The song later doubled in streams over a period of six weeks, growing from 1.9 million streams for the week ending November 2 to 4.1 million for the week ending December 7. On December 16, it debuted at number 17 on the Bubbling Under Hot 100, rising to top the chart the following week. Billboard attributed the song's growth to its virality on video sharing platform TikTok, mainly from Blinks' support for Jennie's parts of the song, with fans praising her "enchanting vocals".

On December 30, "One of the Girls" debuted at number 100 on the Billboard Hot 100 with 6 million streams and 1.5 million radio audience impressions, marking Depp's first entry on the chart and Jennie's first entry as a solo artist. On January 13, 2024, "One of the Girls" reached number 69 on the Billboard Hot 100, making Jennie surpass her bandmate Rosé's "On the Ground" (2021) for the highest-charting song by a female K-pop solo artist. Jennie subsequently became the first female K-pop solo artist in history to chart a song for seven consecutive weeks on the Hot 100. The song peaked at number 51 on the Billboard Hot 100 and number 17 on Hot R&B/Hip-Hop Songs on March 9, and number four on Hot R&B Songs on April 20. It also peaked at number 8 on Rhythmic Airplay on March 23, and number 18 on Pop Airplay on April 27. In May, the song spent its twentieth week on the Billboard Hot 100, making Jennie the first Korean female soloist to have a song on the chart for 20 weeks. She joined Psy as the only two Korean soloists to achieve this feat, after his song "Gangnam Style" (2012). The song surpassed 1 billion streams on Spotify and made Jennie the first Korean female solo artist to receive a platinum certification from the Recording Industry Association of America (RIAA). As of July 2025, it was the most-streamed Blackpink collaboration song with over 1.9 billion streams on Spotify.

On the Billboard Global 200 chart, "One of the Girls" peaked at number 10 on January 20, 2024, entering the top ten for the first time with 40.6 million streams worldwide during the week. With this, the Weeknd achieved his 11th top-ten hit, Jennie her second, and Depp her first on the chart. On the Billboard Global Excl. US, the song entered the top ten at number 7 the same week with 33.6 million streams outside the US. This marked the Weeknd's ninth, Jennie's second, and Depp's first top-ten hit on the chart. After three further weeks in the top ten, the song reached a new peak at number five on the Global Excl. US chart dated February 10, with 38.6 million streams outside the US (up 2%). On February 17, the song remained charting at number six on the Global Excl. US for an 18th consecutive week, as well as number 11 on the Global 200. On Luminate's 2024 mid-year music report, "One of the Girls" ranked as the seventh most-streamed song of the year worldwide by overall on-demand audio streaming volume, with 860 million streams between January 1 and July 1, 2024. In the United Kingdom, it peaked at number 21 on the UK Singles Chart, becoming the highest-charting solo song by a Blackpink member. The song remained on the chart for a total of 17 weeks. It earned 430,000 UK chart units as of October 2024, the most for any Blackpink member's solo single.

== Music video ==
The official music video for "One of the Girls" was released on July 6, 2023. It is composed of a montage of scenes from The Idol featuring the Weeknd, Jennie, and Lily-Rose Depp. In the video, Jocelyn (portrayed by Depp) and Dyanne (portrayed by Jennie) party with one another, before Jocelyn performs the song with a microphone in her home. Meanwhile, Tedros (portrayed by the Weeknd) is depicted lurking in the backdrop, watching Jocelyn and Dyanne dance together. The video concludes with a shot of Tedros and Jocelyn sharing an embrace.

== Live performances ==
On October 22–23, 2024, the Weeknd performed "One of the Girls" for the first time during his shows at the Accor Stadium in Sydney for the After Hours til Dawn Tour. He also performed the song at his Spotify Billions Club Live concert at Santa Monica's Barker Hangar on December 17. On June 7, 2026, Jennie performed "One of the Girls" for the first time during her headlining performance at the Governors Ball Music Festival. She further included the song in her headlining festival sets at Roskilde Festival on July 3, Open'er Festival on July 4, and Mad Cool on July 10. On October 8, Jennie joined the Weeknd for a surprise performance of "One of the Girls" at his second Goyang Stadium concert in Goyang on the After Hours til Dawn Tour, marking the first time both artists performed together.

== Track listing ==
- Digital and streaming single
1. "One of the Girls" – 4:04
2. "One of the Girls" (sped up) – 3:35
3. "One of the Girls" (slowed) – 5:05
4. "One of the Girls" (instrumental) – 4:04
5. "One of the Girls" (a cappella) – 4:09
- 7-inch vinyl
1. "One of the Girls" – 4:04
2. "Popular" – 3:35

== Credits and personnel ==
Credits adapted from Tidal.

- The Weeknd – vocals, songwriter, producer
- Jennie – vocals
- Lily-Rose Depp – vocals, songwriter
- Mike Dean – songwriter, producer, mixing engineer, mastering engineer
- Sam Levinson – songwriter
- Ramsey – songwriter
- Sage Skolfield – additional producer, assisting mixing engineer
- Tommy Rush – recording engineer

== Charts ==
=== Weekly charts ===
Weekly chart performance for "One of the Girls"
Chart (2023–2026)	Peak position
Australia (ARIA)	30
Australia Hip Hop/R&B (ARIA)	7
Austria (Ö3 Austria Top 40)	72
Brazil Hot 100 (Billboard)	64
Canada Hot 100 (Billboard)	29
Czech Republic Singles Digital (ČNS IFPI)	89
Estonia Airplay (TopHit)	88
France (SNEP)	110
Germany (GfK)	53
Global 200 (Billboard)	10
Greece International (IFPI)	3
Hong Kong (Billboard)	24
Hungary (Single Top 40)	4
India International (IMI)	3
Indonesia (Billboard)	2
Ireland (IRMA)	33
Latvia Streaming (LAIPA)	10
Lebanon (Lebanese Top 20)	7
Lithuania (AGATA)	6
Malaysia International (RIM)	1
MENA (IFPI)	6
Netherlands (Single Top 100)	66
New Zealand (Recorded Music NZ)	28
Norway (VG-lista)	21
Panama Streaming (PRODUCE)	194
Philippines (Philippines Hot 100)	62
Poland (Polish Streaming Top 100)	40
Portugal (AFP)	23
Saudi Arabia (IFPI)	15
Singapore (RIAS)	5
Slovakia Singles Digital (ČNS IFPI)	35
South Korea (Circle)	158
Sweden (Sverigetopplistan)	26
Switzerland (Schweizer Hitparade)	45
Thailand (IFPI)	13
United Arab Emirates (IFPI)	4
UK Singles (Official Charts)	21
US Billboard Hot 100	51
US Hot R&B/Hip-Hop Songs (Billboard)	17
US Pop Airplay (Billboard)	18
US Rhythmic Airplay (Billboard)	8
Vietnam (Vietnam Hot 100)	6

=== Year-end charts ===
2024 year-end chart performance for "One of the Girls"
Chart (2024)	Position
Australia (ARIA)	51
Australia Hip Hop/R&B (ARIA)	8
Canada (Canadian Hot 100)	89
Global 200 (Billboard)	19
India International (IMI)	3
Philippines (Philippines Hot 100)	34
Portugal (AFP)	40
US Hot R&B/Hip-Hop Songs (Billboard)	39
US Rhythmic (Billboard)	45

2025 year-end chart performance for "One of the Girls"
Chart (2025)	Position
Global 200 (Billboard)	39
India International (IMI)	5

== Certifications and sales ==
Certifications for "One of the Girls"
Region	Certification	Certified units/sales
Australia (ARIA)	Gold	35,000^{‡}
Austria (IFPI Austria)	Gold	15,000^{‡}
Brazil (Pro-Música Brasil)	7× Diamond	1,120,000^{‡}
Denmark (IFPI Danmark)	Platinum	90,000^{‡}
France (SNEP)	Diamond	333,333^{‡}
Germany (BVMI)	Gold	300,000^{‡}
Italy (FIMI)	Gold	50,000^{‡}
New Zealand (RMNZ)	3× Platinum	90,000^{‡}
Poland (ZPAV)	2× Platinum	100,000^{‡}
Portugal (AFP)	3× Platinum	30,000^{‡}
Spain (Promusicae)	Platinum	100,000^{‡}
United Kingdom (BPI)	Platinum	600,000^{‡}
United States (RIAA)	Platinum	1,000,000^{‡}
Streaming
Central America (CFC)	3× Platinum	21,000,000^{†}
Greece (IFPI Greece)	4× Platinum	8,000,000^{†}
Worldwide (Luminate)	—	860,000,000
^{‡} Sales+streaming figures based on certification alone.^{†} Streaming-only figures based on certification alone.

== Release history ==
Release dates and formats for "One of the Girls"
Region	Date	Format(s)	Version(s)	Label(s)	Ref.
Various	December 8, 2023	Digital download; streaming	5-track single	XO; Republic	
United States	December 12, 2023	Rhythmic contemporary radio	Original	XO; Republic	
United States	June 14, 2024	7-inch vinyl	Original	XO; Republic	

== See also ==
- List of best-selling singles in Brazil
- List of Billboard Global 200 top-ten singles in 2024
- List of number-one songs of 2023 (Malaysia)
- List of number-one songs of 2024 (Malaysia)
