= List of number-one songs of 2026 (Malaysia) =

This is a list of the number-one singles of 2026 in Malaysia, highlighting singles that reached the top position on Malaysian major music charts. These charts serve as key indicators of a song's popularity in the country, utilizing different methodologies and sources for their rankings.

== IFPI Official Southeast Asia Charts ==
Issue Date	The Official Malaysia Chart		The Official Malaysia Domestic Chart		The Official Malaysia Chinese Chart	
Issue Date	Song	Artist(s)	Song	Artist(s)	Song	Artist(s)
1 January	"Tabola Bale"	Silet Open Up, Jacson Seran, Juan Reza and Diva Aurel	"P Ramlee Saloma"	Alpha	"跳楼机 Jumping Machine"	LBI利比
8 January	"The Fate of Ophelia"	Taylor Swift	"P Ramlee Saloma"	Alpha	"跳楼机 Jumping Machine"	LBI利比
15 January	"Kota Ini Tak Sama Tanpamu"	Nadhif Basalamah	"Dalam Diam"	Zynakal, Zamir Harith, Mojack Hafiz and Bel Janni	"时光大耳窿"	3P
22 January	"Kota Ini Tak Sama Tanpamu"	Nadhif Basalamah	"Dalam Diam"	Zynakal, Zamir Harith, Mojack Hafiz and Bel Janni	"时光大耳窿"	3P
29 January	"Kota Ini Tak Sama Tanpamu"	Nadhif Basalamah	"Dalam Diam"	Zynakal, Zamir Harith, Mojack Hafiz and Bel Janni	"时光大耳窿"	3P
5 February	"Kota Ini Tak Sama Tanpamu"	Nadhif Basalamah	"Dalam Diam"	Zynakal, Zamir Harith, Mojack Hafiz and Bel Janni	"时光大耳窿"	3P
12 February	"Kota Ini Tak Sama Tanpamu"	Nadhif Basalamah	"Dalam Diam"	Zynakal, Zamir Harith, Mojack Hafiz and Bel Janni	"福气马上来"	1119
19 February	"Kota Ini Tak Sama Tanpamu"	Nadhif Basalamah	"P Ramlee Saloma"	Alpha	"HORSEH"	薛家燕, Jaspers Lai, 3P
26 February	"Kota Ini Tak Sama Tanpamu"	Nadhif Basalamah	"Dalam Diam"	Zynakal, Zamir Harith, Mojack Hafiz and Bel Janni	"福气马上来"	1119
5 March	"Risk It All"	Bruno Mars	"Dalam Diam"	Zynakal, Zamir Harith, Mojack Hafiz and Bel Janni	"一半一半"	Top Barry, INDEcompany
12 March	"Risk It All"	Bruno Mars	"Jodoh Lebaran"	Aisha Retno	"海屿你"	Cole先生, 马也_Crabbit
19 March	"Jodoh Lebaran"	Aisha Retno	"Jodoh Lebaran"	Aisha Retno	"海屿你"	Cole先生, 马也_Crabbit
26 March	"Jodoh Lebaran"	Aisha Retno	"Jodoh Lebaran"	Aisha Retno	"海屿你"	Cole先生, 马也_Crabbit
2 April	"Jodoh Lebaran"	Aisha Retno	"Jodoh Lebaran"	Aisha Retno	"海屿你"	Cole先生, 马也_Crabbit
9 April	"Jodoh Lebaran"	Aisha Retno	"Jodoh Lebaran"	Aisha Retno	"海屿你"	Cole先生, 马也_Crabbit
16 April	"Risk It All"	Bruno Mars	"Jodoh Lebaran"	Aisha Retno	"海屿你"	Cole先生, 马也_Crabbit
23 April	"Beauty and a Beat"	Justin Bieber	"Sayang Orang Sama"	Adira Suhaimi	"海屿你"	Cole先生, 马也_Crabbit
30 April	"Risk It All"	Bruno Mars	"Sayang Orang Sama"	Adira Suhaimi	"海屿你"	Cole先生, 马也_Crabbit
7 May	"Risk It All"	Bruno Mars	"Sayang Orang Sama"	Adira Suhaimi	"海屿你"	Cole先生, 马也_Crabbit
14 May	"Risk It All"	Bruno Mars	"Sayang Orang Sama"	Adira Suhaimi	"海屿你"	Cole先生, 马也_Crabbit
21 May	"Risk It All"	Bruno Mars	"Sayang Orang Sama"	Adira Suhaimi	"海屿你"	Cole先生, 马也_Crabbit
28 May	"玻璃 (glass)"	Gareth.T	"Sayang Orang Sama"	Adira Suhaimi	"玻璃 (glass)"	Gareth.T
4 June	"Hate That I Made You Love Me"	Ariana Grande	"Sayang Orang Sama"	Adira Suhaimi	"玻璃 (glass)"	Gareth.T
11 June	"Hate That I Made You Love Me"	Ariana Grande	"Sayang Orang Sama"	Adira Suhaimi	"玻璃 (glass)"	Gareth.T
18 June	"Hate That I Made You Love Me"	Ariana Grande	"Sayang Orang Sama"	Adira Suhaimi	"玻璃 (glass)"	Gareth.T
25 June	"Hate That I Made You Love Me"	Ariana Grande	"Sayang Orang Sama"	Adira Suhaimi	"玻璃 (glass)"	Gareth.T
2 July	"Hate That I Made You Love Me"	Ariana Grande	"Sayang Orang Sama"	Adira Suhaimi	"玻璃 (glass)"	Gareth.T
9 July	"Hate That I Made You Love Me"	Ariana Grande	"Sayang Orang Sama"	Adira Suhaimi	"玻璃 (glass)"	Gareth.T
16 July	"Hate That I Made You Love Me"	Ariana Grande	"Sayang Orang Sama"	Adira Suhaimi	"玻璃 (glass)"	Gareth.T
23 July	"Teh Hijau"	Tulus	"Sayang Orang Sama"	Adira Suhaimi	"玻璃 (glass)"	Gareth.T
30 July	"Teh Hijau"	Tulus	"Sayang Orang Sama"	Adira Suhaimi	"玻璃 (glass)"	Gareth.T
6 August	"Teh Hijau"	Tulus	"Sayang Orang Sama"	Adira Suhaimi	"海屿你"	Cole先生, 马也_Crabbit
13 August	"Teh Hijau"	Tulus	"Sayang Orang Sama"	Adira Suhaimi	"甲乙丙丁 (Strangers)"	Li Jiawei
20 August	"Teh Hijau"	Tulus	"Tiwikarma"	K.O.I	"甲乙丙丁 (Strangers)"	Li Jiawei
27 August	"Teh Hijau"	Tulus	"Tiwikarma"	K.O.I	"甲乙丙丁 (Strangers)"	Li Jiawei
3 September	"Teh Hijau"	Tulus	"Sayang Orang Sama"	Adira Suhaimi	"甲乙丙丁 (Strangers)"	Li Jiawei
10 September	"Teh Hijau"	Tulus	"Sayang Orang Sama"	Adira Suhaimi	"甲乙丙丁 (Strangers)"	Li Jiawei
17 September	"Teh Hijau"	Tulus	"Sayang Orang Sama"	Adira Suhaimi	"甲乙丙丁 (Strangers)"	Li Jiawei
24 September	"Teh Hijau"	Tulus	"Terbang"	Noh Salleh	"甲乙丙丁 (Strangers)"	Li Jiawei
1 October	"Teh Hijau"	Tulus	"Terbang"	Noh Salleh	"甲乙丙丁 (Strangers)"	Li Jiawei
8 October	"Teh Hijau"	Tulus	"Ku Yang Berjuang"	Danial Kifli	"甲乙丙丁 (Strangers)"	Li Jiawei
15 October	"Great Expectation"	Sienna Spiro	"Terbang"	Noh Salleh	"海屿你"	Cole先生, 马也_Crabbit
22 October	"Great Expectation"	Sienna Spiro	"Terbang"	Noh Salleh	"海屿你"	Cole先生, 马也_Crabbit
29 October	"Great Expectation"	Sienna Spiro	"Terbang"	Noh Salleh	"海屿你"	Cole先生, 马也_Crabbit
5 November	"Great Expectation"	Sienna Spiro	"Terbang"	Noh Salleh	"海屿你"	Cole先生, 马也_Crabbit
12 November	"Hong Kong (feat. 王菲季候風)"	The Weeknd	"Terbang"	Noh Salleh	"海屿你"	Cole先生, 马也_Crabbit

== Billboard Malaysia Songs ==
Issue date	Song	Artist(s)	Ref.
3 January	"The Fate of Ophelia"	Taylor Swift	
10 January	"The Fate of Ophelia"	Taylor Swift	
17 January	"The Fate of Ophelia"	Taylor Swift	
24 January	"The Fate of Ophelia"	Taylor Swift	
31 January	"Kota Ini Tak Sama Tanpamu"	Nadhif Basalamah, (Malaysia) Aisha Retno and Aziz Harun	
7 February	"Kota Ini Tak Sama Tanpamu"	Nadhif Basalamah, (Malaysia) Aisha Retno and Aziz Harun	
14 February	"Kota Ini Tak Sama Tanpamu"	Nadhif Basalamah, (Malaysia) Aisha Retno and Aziz Harun	
21 February	"Kota Ini Tak Sama Tanpamu"	Nadhif Basalamah, (Malaysia) Aisha Retno and Aziz Harun	
28 February	"Kota Ini Tak Sama Tanpamu"	Nadhif Basalamah, (Malaysia) Aisha Retno and Aziz Harun	
7 March	"Kota Ini Tak Sama Tanpamu"	Nadhif Basalamah, (Malaysia) Aisha Retno and Aziz Harun	
14 March	"Risk It All"	Bruno Mars	
21 March	"Risk It All"	Bruno Mars	
28 March	"Risk It All"	Bruno Mars	
4 April	"Jodoh Lebaran"	(Malaysia) Aisha Retno	
11 April	"Swim"	BTS	
18 April	"Risk It All"	Bruno Mars	
25 April	"Risk It All"	Bruno Mars	
2 May	"Beauty and a Beat"	Justin Bieber featuring Nicki Minaj	
9 May	"Risk It All"	Bruno Mars	
16 May	"Risk It All"	Bruno Mars	
23 May	"Risk It All"	Bruno Mars	
30 May	"Risk It All"	Bruno Mars	
6 June	"Risk It All"	Bruno Mars	
13 June	"Hate That I Made You Love Me"	Ariana Grande	
20 June	"Hate That I Made You Love Me"	Ariana Grande	
27 June	"Hate That I Made You Love Me"	Ariana Grande	
4 July	"Hate That I Made You Love Me"	Ariana Grande	
11 July	"Hate That I Made You Love Me"	Ariana Grande	
18 July	"Hate That I Made You Love Me"	Ariana Grande	
25 July	"Hate That I Made You Love Me"	Ariana Grande	
1 August	"Teh Hijau"	Tulus	
8 August	"Teh Hijau"	Tulus	
15 August	"Teh Hijau"	Tulus	
22 August	"Teh Hijau"	Tulus	
29 August	"Teh Hijau"	Tulus	
5 September	"Teh Hijau"	Tulus	
12 September	"Teh Hijau"	Tulus	
19 September	"Teh Hijau"	Tulus	
26 September	"Teh Hijau"	Tulus	
3 October	"Teh Hijau"	Tulus	
10 October	"Teh Hijau"	Tulus	
17 October	"Great Expectation"	Sienna Spiro	
24 October	"Great Expectation"	Sienna Spiro	
31 October	"Great Expectation"	Sienna Spiro	
7 November	"Great Expectation"	Sienna Spiro	
14 November	"Great Expectation"	Sienna Spiro	
21 November	"Hong Kong"	The Weeknd and Faye Wong	
