= You & Me (Jennie song) =

Single by Jennie
- Released: October 6, 2023
- Recorded: 2018
- Studio: The Black Label (Seoul)
- Genre: Dance-pop; EDM
- Length: 2:59
- Label: YG; Interscope
- Composers: Teddy; 24; Vince
- Lyricists: Teddy; Danny Chung

Jennie singles chronology
"Solo" (2018)	"You & Me" (2023)	"One of the Girls" (2023)

Performance video
- "You & Me" on YouTube

"You & Me" is a song by South Korean singer and rapper Jennie. It was released through YG Entertainment and Interscope Records on October 6, 2023. The song marked Jennie's first solo single in five years since "Solo" (2018), and her final solo release under both labels before her departure in December 2023. Written by Teddy and Danny Chung and composed by Teddy, 24, and Vince, it is a dance-pop and EDM track with romantic lyrics.

The song was a commercial success, peaking at number seven on the Billboard Global 200 and topping the Global Excl. U.S.—Jennie's first number-one on that chart. In the United Kingdom, it became the first song by a female K-pop soloist to top the UK Singles Downloads Chart and entered the top 40 of the UK Singles Chart. The song also reached the top ten on various charts, including the Circle Digital Chart in South Korea, as well as other charts in Hong Kong, Malaysia, Singapore, Taiwan, Vietnam, Indonesia, and the Philippines.

"You & Me" was first performed during Blackpink's Born Pink World Tour (2022–2023) prior to its official release. Originally intended to be released alongside "Solo" in 2018, the song was shelved for several years before its eventual release. A remixed version, featuring additional writing and composition by Bekuh Boom, was performed at Coachella and BST Hyde Park. Jennie also presented a jazz rendition at Chanel's Métiers d'Art showcase in Tokyo. The song was awarded Best Dance Performance at the 2024 MAMA Awards.

== Background and release ==
In a behind-the-scenes clip uploaded to her YouTube channel in January 2023, Jennie revealed that she had recorded "You & Me" three to four years prior to 2022 and that "it was on the list of nominees for [her] solo...or maybe it was after that". Ultimately, however, she made her solo debut on November 12, 2018, with the single "Solo", which topped both the Gaon Digital Chart and the Billboard World Digital Songs charts.

While preparing for Blackpink's Born Pink World Tour in 2022, Jennie and producer Teddy considered many songs to perform for her solo segment of the show's setlist, eventually choosing "You & Me". She then worked with choreographers Eunchong and Leejung Lee to realize her vision for how she wanted to perform the song.

Following the conclusion of the Born Pink World Tour in September 2023, it was officially announced on October 4, 2023, that "You & Me" would be released as a special single two days later. Jennie's label, YG Entertainment, elaborated on the single's release with the statement, "We hope the song becomes a special gift through which fans remember their memories from Born Pink tour." The announcement on Blackpink's social media handles was accompanied by a teaser photo of Jennie in a red dress standing in the ocean in front of a full moon. The next day, a second teaser poster was released, depicting a collage of various visuals from the tour. The cover art for the single was illustrated by Sailor Moon creator Naoko Takeuchi, with whom Jennie also collaborated on a merchandise collection.

The single was released for digital download and streaming on October 6, 2023, by YG Entertainment, along with "You & Me (Coachella Version)" the remix of the song that was performed by Jennie at the Coachella Festival. This marked the singer's second solo release under Blackpink's labels, YG and Interscope. In 2023, while Blackpink renewed their contract with YG for group activities, the members chose not to extend their solo contracts, making this Jennie's final solo release with both labels.

== Music and lyrics ==
"You & Me" was described as a "sultry" dance-pop and "dreamy" EDM song driven by synth sounds, composed by Vince, Teddy, and 24, and written by the latter two along with Danny Chung. The Coachella version of the song shows "Jennie's versatility", as the track is driven by a more hip-hop-heavy beats and includes an additional rap verse written by long-time collaborator Bekuh Boom. Lyrically, the track is a love song in which Jennie sings about falling for the person she's singing to and being ready to let go of any fear when it comes to love. In the chorus, she sings, "I love you and me / Dancing in the moonlight," emphasizing that nothing else matters to her other than her connection with her lover.

== Reception ==
People's editors praised "You & Me", noting that the track showcases Jennie's "alluring vocals" and rap delivery while lyrically presenting her emotions openly. Giselle P. Acosta of The Harvard Crimson described the lyrics as "thematically playful and interesting", applauding the way they merge Jennie’s "assertiveness" and self-assurance with a selfless devotion to her partner. Still, Acosta criticized the instrumental, calling it "run-of-the-mill" background noise dominated by "screeching synths" that overshadowed Jennie’s voice. She argued that the track marks a sonic shift from Jennie’s earlier single "Solo" and ultimately doesn’t meet the expectations tied to her status.

=== Accolades ===
Awards and nominations for "You & Me"
Year	Organization	Award	Result	Ref.
2024	The Fact Music Awards	Best Music: Winter	Nominated	
2024	Korea Grand Music Awards	Best Song 10	Nominated	
2024	MAMA Awards	Best Dance Performance Female Solo	Won	
2024	MAMA Awards	Song of the Year	Nominated	

== Commercial performance ==
"You & Me" debuted at number seven on the Billboard Global 200 with 65.1 million streams worldwide, marking Jennie's first solo entry and top-ten song on the chart. With this, all members of Blackpink reached the top ten of the chart, following Rosé's "On the Ground" (2021), Lisa's "Lalisa" (2021) and "Money" (2021), and Jisoo's "Flower" (2023), totaling five top-ten hits between the group members alongside four top-ten hits as a group. "You & Me" also debuted at number one on the Billboard Global Excl. U.S. with 60 million streams, marking Jennie's first solo number-one song and second solo entry on the chart. It was her fourth number-one song including her group Blackpink's three number-one hits "Lovesick Girls" (2020), "Pink Venom" (2022), and "Shut Down" (2022). Jennie became the second member of the group to reach number one after Rosé's "On the Ground" topped the chart in 2021, making Blackpink the first act with multiple members having topped the Global Excl. U.S. chart. Additionally, it meant all four members reached the top ten of the chart with a total of five top-ten hits between the group members, outpacing Blackpink's four as a group.

In the United Kingdom, "You & Me" debuted at number 39 on the UK Singles Chart, becoming Jennie's first entry as a solo artist. With her feat, Blackpink became the first K-pop girl group whose members all entered the chart as solo artists. It also reached number one on the UK Singles Downloads Chart and UK Singles Sales Chart, making Jennie the first female K-pop soloist to top either chart. In South Korea, "You & Me" debuted at number 67 on the fortieth issued week (October 1–7) of the Circle Digital Chart, with less than two days of tracking. The following week, it rose to a peak at number four for the period dated October 8–14, marking her first top-ten hit in the country since "Solo" (2018). The song also topped Billboard’s Hits of the World charts, including Hong Kong Songs, Malaysia Songs, Taiwan Songs, as well as the RIAS Top Charts in Singapore, and the Vietnam Hot 100. The song also peaked in the top ten, reaching number five on Billboard Indonesia Top 100, and number six on the Philippines Songs chart.

== Live performances ==
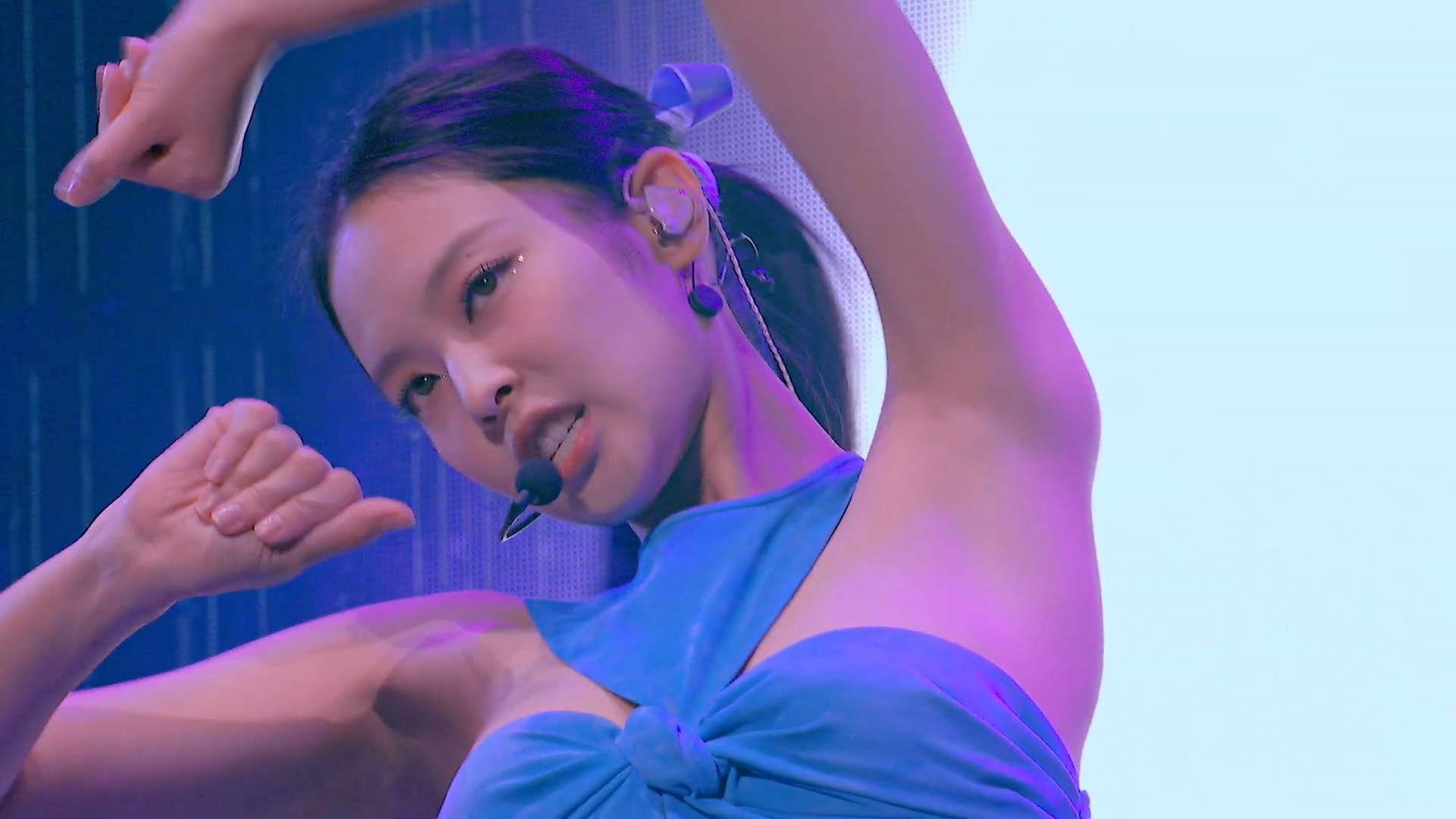
Jennie performing "You & Me" in Dallas, 2022

Jennie made her debut performance of "You & Me" on October 15, 2022, the opening concert of Blackpink's Born Pink World Tour at KSPO Dome in Seoul, South Korea. She introduced the song by explaining to the audience, "I wanted to show you all something new, you might have been a bit surprised"; the song was a regular part of the setlist for the remainder of the tour. The performance featured a partnered ballet dance routine with Jennie and a male backup dancer, complemented by dimmed lighting and their silhouettes projected onto a backdrop of the moon.

On April 15 and 22, 2023, Jennie performed a remixed version of "You & Me" during Blackpink's headlining set at the Coachella Valley Music and Arts Festival in Indio, California. The remix featured a new rap verse followed by an extended dance break. On July 2, she performed this version of the song alongside "Solo" during Blackpink's headlining concert at BST Hyde Park in London. At a special showcase for the Chanel 2022–23 Métiers d'Art collection in Tokyo, Japan on June 1, Jennie serenaded the audience with a mashup of Roberta Flack's "Killing Me Softly with His Song" and a jazz cover of Frank Sinatra's "Fly Me to the Moon", followed by a jazz rendition of "You & Me". She performed without elaborate choreography, instead highlighting her vocals over a delicate piano accompaniment.

Jennie made her first televised performance of "You & Me" on the first episode of The Seasons: Lee Hyo-ri's Red Carpet, which aired on January 5, 2024. On November 10, 2024, Jennie performed "You & Me" and her new single "Mantra" at the Superpop Japan festival held at the Panasonic Stadium Suita in Suita, Japan.

== Dance performance video ==
A scene in the dance performance video of Jennie and backup dancers dancing in front of a moon backdrop.

A dance performance video was directed by Lee Han Gyeol and uploaded to Blackpink's official YouTube channel alongside the single on October 6, 2023. Upon release, it topped the worldwide trending list on YouTube and garnered 10 million views in less than 24 hours.

The video begins with Jennie's mouth projected in black-and-white on a large circular screen as she sings the opening lines. The camera then cuts to the singer in a red ensemble and a crew of back-up dancers in black leotards as they replicate the choreography performed on tour against a minimalist backdrop of the moon. In the chorus, Jennie and a male backup dancer perform a ballet dance routine as partners with only their silhouettes visible against the moon. The singer then dances alone in a hallway lit red for the rap verse. In the outro, Jennie is joined by her male partner and the two dance again in front of the moon, now red. On October 8, a stage mix video was released, combining footage of Jennie performing "You & Me" from multiple shows on the Born Pink World Tour. On October 11, a live performance video of "You & Me (Jazz ver.)" was released, which was the version performed by Jennie at a Chanel fashion show in June.

== Track listing ==
- Digital download and streaming
1. "You & Me" – 2:59
2. "You & Me" (Coachella version) – 2:59

== Credits and personnel ==
Credits are adapted from MelOn and YouTube descriptions.

- Jennie – vocals
- Teddy – lyricist, composer
- Danny Chung – lyricist
- 24 – composer, arranger
- Vince – composer, arranger
- Bekuh Boom – lyricist (Coachella version)
- IDO – arranger (Coachella version)
- Nohc – arranger (Jazz version)
- Youngjin Kim – drums (Jazz version)
- Daeho Kim – bass (Jazz version)
- Beomseok Ha – guitar (Jazz version)
- Yongjun Jeong – piano (Jazz version)
- Josh Gudwin – mixing engineer
- Chris Gehringer – mastering engineer

== Charts ==
=== Weekly charts ===
Weekly chart performance
Chart (2023–2024)	Peak position
Australia (ARIA)	69
Canada Hot 100 (Billboard)	71
France (SNEP)	117
Global 200 (Billboard)	7
Hong Kong (Billboard)	1
India International (IMI)	16
Indonesia (Billboard)	5
Japan (Japan Hot 100)	36
Japan Heatseekers (Billboard Japan)	1
Japan Combined Singles (Oricon)	35
Malaysia (Billboard)	1
MENA (IFPI)	19
New Zealand Hot Singles (RMNZ)	5
Philippines (Billboard)	6
Saudi Arabia (IFPI)	12
Singapore (RIAS)	1
South Korea (Circle)	4
Taiwan (Billboard)	1
UK Singles (Official Charts)	39
US Bubbling Under Hot 100 (Billboard)	2
US Digital Song Sales (Billboard)	6
Vietnam (Vietnam Hot 100)	1

Coachella version
Chart (2023)	Peak position
South Korea Download (Circle)	76

=== Monthly charts ===
Monthly chart performance
Chart (2023)	Position
South Korea (Circle)	5

=== Year-end charts ===
2023 year-end chart performance for "You & Me"
Chart (2023)	Position
South Korea (Circle)	116

2024 year-end chart performance for "You & Me"
Chart (2024)	Position
Global Excl. US (Billboard)	189
South Korea (Circle)	73

== Certifications ==
Certifications
Region	Certification	Certified units/sales
Brazil (Pro-Música Brasil)	2× Platinum	80,000^{‡}
^{‡} Sales+streaming figures based on certification alone.

== Release history ==
Release formats for "You & Me"
Region	Date	Format(s)	Version	Label(s)	Ref.
Various	October 6, 2023	Digital download; streaming	Original; Coachella	YG; Interscope	
Italy	October 20, 2023	Radio airplay	Original	Universal	

== See also ==
- List of Billboard Global 200 top-ten singles in 2023
- List of Billboard Global Excl. U.S. number ones of 2023
- List of K-pop songs on the Billboard charts
- List of number-one songs of 2023 (Hong Kong)
- List of number-one songs of 2023 (Malaysia)
- List of number-one songs of 2023 (Singapore)
- List of number-one songs of 2023 (Vietnam)
- List of UK Singles Downloads Chart number ones of the 2020s
- List of UK Singles Sales Chart number ones
