= Recording Industry Association of Malaysia =

Malaysian music industry association

- Abbreviation: RIM
- Formation: 1978; 48 years ago
- Legal status: Non-profit company
- Purpose: Music industry in Malaysia
- Location(s): Solaris Mont Kiara, Kuala Lumpur
- Region served: Malaysia
- Members: Malaysian Recording Industry
- Chairman: Kenny Ong
- Website: www.rim.org.my

Recording Industry Association of Malaysia (RIM) (BM: Persatuan Industri Rakaman Malaysia) is a Malaysian non-profit music organisation, founded on 12 December 1978, as the Malaysian Association of Phonograph Producers (MAPP). In the end of the 1980s, it changed its name to Malaysian Association of Phonogram and Videogram Producers and Distributors (MAPV). It adopted its current name in 1996.

It currently represents over 340 locally incorporated recording companies and businesses, all of which are involved in the production, manufacturing and distribution of local and international sound, music video and karaoke recording. This accounts for around 95% of all legitimate recordings commercially available in the music market of Malaysia.

Under the Ministry of Domestic Trade & Consumer Affairs (MDTCA), RIM is a member of the Ministry's Special Copyright Task Force. It was also a member of the Attorney General's Chambers' Copyright Law Revision Committee.

The International Federation of the Phonographic Industry (IFPI) recognises RIM as the National Group for Malaysia. The RIM Chairman sits on the IFPI Asia/Pacific Regional Board. RIM also is a member of the Asean Music Industry Association (AMIA).

It has been responsible for organising the annual music event, Anugerah Industri Muzik (AIM).

== Certification levels ==
RIM is responsible for certifying gold and platinum albums in Malaysia, based on sales. The levels are:

Music CDs

Certification	Before 1 January 1997	Before 1 January 2000	Before 1 January 2003	Before 1 January 2006	Before 1 July 2009	After 1 July 2009
Gold	100,000	50,000	25,000	15,000	10,000	7,500
Platinum	200,000	100,000	50,000	25,000	20,000	15,000

International repertoire

Certification	Before 1 January 2000	Before 1 January 2003	Until 31 December 2005
Gold	25,000	15,000	10,000
Platinum	50,000	25,000	20,000

Note: Awards for domestic and international repertoire are different before 2006.

Combined sales

Introduced in July 2009.

Certification	Number of copies
Gold	15,000
Platinum	30,000

Digital downloads

Introduced in July 2009.

Certification	Number of copies
Gold	75,000
Platinum	150,000

== RIM Charts ==
Since 2017, RIM operates several record charts that rank the best-performing songs in Malaysia. The main RIM Chart lists the Top 20 most streamed international & domestic songs in Malaysia, with a separate chart for the Top 10 most streamed domestic songs.

Starting the week ending 24 March 2022, the Top 20 International and Domestic Singles chart was reconfigured to be exclusively for International single releases, while the Top 10 Domestic Singles chart was reconfigured into a Malay songs chart. Also in the same week, the Top 10 Chinese Singles chart was introduced.

On January 23, 2025, the chart was rebranded to the Official Malaysia Chart and joined the Official Southeast Asia Charts launched by the IFPI in collaboration with RIM. The Malay and Chinese songs charts were also rebranded to the Official Malaysia Domestic Chart and the Official Malaysia Chinese Chart.

=== Song achievements ===
==== Songs with most weeks at number one ====
22 weeks

- Lady Gaga and Bruno Mars – "Die With A Smile" (2024–2025)

16 weeks

- Luis Fonsi and Daddy Yankee featuring Justin Bieber – "Despacito" (2017)
- Ed Sheeran – "Perfect" (2017–2018)
- Joji – "Glimpse of Us" (2022)

14 weeks

- Fifty Fifty – "Cupid" (2023)
- Jungkook featuring Latto – "Seven" (2023)

12 weeks

- Camila Cabello featuring Shawn Mendes – "Señorita" (2019)

11 weeks

- Ed Sheeran – "Shape of You" (2017)
- Tones and I – "Dance Monkey" (2019–2020)
- Troye Sivan – "Angel Baby" (2022)
- Rose and Bruno Mars – "Apt." (2024–2025)

10 weeks

- Ariana Grande – "7 Rings" (2019)
- Adele – "Easy on Me" (2021)
- SZA – "Kill Bill" (2022–2023)

=== Number-one songs ===
2017 2018 2019 2020 2021 2022 2023 2024 2025

== See also ==
- Music industry
- List of music recording certifications
- 8TV RIM Chart Show
