= List of number-one songs of 2023 (Malaysia) =

Most listened songs of Malaysian language

== RIM streaming charts ==
Below is a list of songs that topped the RIM charts in 2023 according to the Recording Industry Association of Malaysia.

Issue Date	International songs			Malay songs			Chinese songs		
Issue Date	Song	Artist(s)	Ref.	Song	Artist(s)	Ref.	Song	Artist(s)	Ref.
5 January	"Kill Bill"	SZA		"Sayunk I Love You"	Chombi		"如果可以"	William Wei	
12 January	"Kill Bill"	SZA		"Sayunk I Love You"	Chombi		"如果可以"	William Wei	
19 January	"Kill Bill"	SZA		"Sayunk I Love You"	Chombi		"如果可以"	William Wei	
26 January	"Kill Bill"	SZA		"Sayunk I Love You"	Chombi		"天天好天"	Various Artists	
2 February	"Kill Bill"	SZA		"Sayunk I Love You"	Chombi		"如果可以"	William Wei	
9 February	"Kill Bill"	SZA		"Sayunk I Love You"	Chombi		"眼淚記得你"	Shi Shi	
16 February	"Kill Bill"	SZA		"Langit Yang Sama"	Dalia Farhana		"眼淚記得你"	Shi Shi	
23 February	"Kill Bill"	SZA		"Langit Yang Sama"	Dalia Farhana		"烏梅子醬"	Ronghao Li	
2 March	"Die For You (Remix)"	The Weeknd and Ariana Grande		"Langit Yang Sama"	Dalia Farhana		"烏梅子醬"	Ronghao Li	
9 March	"Die For You (Remix)"	The Weeknd and Ariana Grande		"Langit Yang Sama"	Dalia Farhana		"烏梅子醬"	Ronghao Li	
16 March	"Die For You (Remix)"	The Weeknd and Ariana Grande		"Hasrat"	Amir Jahari		"烏梅子醬"	Ronghao Li	
23 March	"Die For You (Remix)"	The Weeknd and Ariana Grande		"Hasrat"	Amir Jahari		"烏梅子醬"	Ronghao Li	
30 March	"Die For You (Remix)"	The Weeknd and Ariana Grande		"Langit Yang Sama"	Dalia Farhana		"烏梅子醬"	Ronghao Li	
6 April	"Cupid"	Fifty Fifty		"Langit Yang Sama"	Dalia Farhana		"烏梅子醬"	Ronghao Li	
13 April	"Cupid"	Fifty Fifty		"Langit Yang Sama"	Dalia Farhana		"烏梅子醬"	Ronghao Li	
20 April	"Cupid"	Fifty Fifty		"Suasana Di Hari Raya"	Anuar and Ellina		"烏梅子醬"	Ronghao Li	
27 April	"Cupid"	Fifty Fifty		"Suasana Di Hari Raya"	Anuar and Ellina		"烏梅子醬"	Ronghao Li	
4 May	"Cupid"	Fifty Fifty		"Langit Yang Sama"	Dalia Farhana		"烏梅子醬"	Ronghao Li	
11 May	"Cupid"	Fifty Fifty		"Langit Yang Sama"	Dalia Farhana		"烏梅子醬"	Ronghao Li	
18 May	"Cupid"	Fifty Fifty		"Langit Yang Sama"	Dalia Farhana		"烏梅子醬"	Ronghao Li	
25 May	"Cupid"	Fifty Fifty		"Langit Yang Sama"	Dalia Farhana		"烏梅子醬"	Ronghao Li	
1 June	"Cupid"	Fifty Fifty		"Langit Yang Sama"	Dalia Farhana		"摯友"	Eric Chou	
8 June	"Cupid"	Fifty Fifty		"Ayuh"	Malique, Ernie Zakri and Aman RA		"摯友"	Eric Chou	
15 June	"Cupid"	Fifty Fifty		"Langit Yang Sama"	Dalia Farhana		"摯友"	Eric Chou	
22 June	"Cupid"	Fifty Fifty		"Mungkin Aku Tak Penting?"	Luqman Podolski featuring Tish Errda		"摯友"	Eric Chou	
29 June	"Cupid"	Fifty Fifty		"Mungkin Aku Tak Penting?"	Luqman Podolski featuring Tish Errda		"如果可以"	William Wei	
6 July	"Cupid"	Fifty Fifty		"Mungkin Aku Tak Penting?"	Luqman Podolski featuring Tish Errda		"如果可以"	William Wei	
13 July	"Super Shy"	NewJeans		"Mungkin Aku Tak Penting?"	Luqman Podolski featuring Tish Errda		"如果可以"	William Wei	
20 July	"Seven"	Jungkook featuring Latto		"Retak Hatiku"	Iera Milpan		"如果可以"	William Wei	
27 July	"Seven"	Jungkook featuring Latto		"Retak Hatiku"	Iera Milpan		"如果可以"	William Wei	
3 August	"Seven"	Jungkook featuring Latto		"Retak Hatiku"	Iera Milpan		"如果可以"	William Wei	
10 August	"Seven"	Jungkook featuring Latto		"Retak Hatiku"	Iera Milpan		"如果可以"	William Wei	
17 August	"Seven"	Jungkook featuring Latto		"Retak Hatiku"	Iera Milpan		"如果可以"	William Wei	
24 August	"Seven"	Jungkook featuring Latto		"Retak Hatiku"	Iera Milpan		"在加納共和國離婚"	Dior大颖 and Firdhaus Farmizi	
31 August	"Seven"	Jungkook featuring Latto		"Retak Hatiku"	Iera Milpan		"如果可以"	William Wei	
7 September	"Seven"	Jungkook featuring Latto		"Retak Hatiku"	Iera Milpan		"如果可以"	William Wei	
14 September	"Seven"	Jungkook featuring Latto		"Retak Hatiku"	Iera Milpan		"如果可以"	William Wei	
21 September	"Seven"	Jungkook featuring Latto		"Retak Hatiku"	Iera Milpan		"如果可以"	William Wei	
28 September	"Seven"	Jungkook featuring Latto		"Retak Hatiku"	Iera Milpan		"如果可以"	William Wei	
5 October	"3D"	Jungkook featuring Jack Harlow		"Retak Hatiku"	Iera Milpan		"如果可以"	William Wei	
12 October	"Seven"	Jungkook featuring Latto		"Retak Hatiku"	Iera Milpan		"如果可以"	William Wei	
19 October	"Seven"	Jungkook featuring Latto		"Retak Hatiku"	Iera Milpan		"如果可以"	William Wei	
26 October	"Greedy"	Tate McRae		"Retak Hatiku"	Iera Milpan		"如果可以"	William Wei	
2 November	"Greedy"	Tate McRae		"Retak Hatiku"	Iera Milpan		"如果可以"	William Wei	
9 November	"Seven"	Jungkook featuring Latto		"Retak Hatiku"	Iera Milpan		"如果可以"	William Wei	
16 November	"Greedy"	Tate McRae		"Retak Hatiku"	Iera Milpan		"如果可以"	William Wei	
23 November	"Greedy"	Tate McRae		"Pujaanku"	Masdo featuring Aisyah Aziz		"如果可以"	William Wei	
30 November	"Yellow"	Coldplay		"Pujaanku"	Masdo featuring Aisyah Aziz		"如果可以"	William Wei	
7 December	"Greedy"	Tate McRae		"Retak Hatiku"	Iera Milpan		"如果可以"	William Wei	
14 December	"One of the Girls"	The Weeknd, Jennie, and Lily-Rose Depp		"Retak Hatiku"	Iera Milpan		"如果可以"	William Wei	
21 December	"One of the Girls"	The Weeknd, Jennie, and Lily-Rose Depp		"Retak Hatiku"	Iera Milpan		"如果可以"	William Wei	
28 December	"One of the Girls"	The Weeknd, Jennie, and Lily-Rose Depp		"Gelora"	Usop		"聖誕星"	Jay Chou featuring Gary Yang	

== Billboard Malaysia Songs ==
Malaysia Songs is a record chart in Malaysia for songs, compiled by Billboard since February 2022. The chart is updated every Tuesday on Billboard's website. The chart ranks the top 25 songs weekly in Malaysia.

The chart tracks songs' performance from Friday to Thursday. Chart rankings are based on digital downloads from full-service digital music retailers (sales from direct-to-consumer sites such as an individual artist's store are excluded) and online streaming occurring in Malaysia during the tracking period. All data are provided by MRC Data.

Issue date	Song	Artist(s)	Ref.
7 January	"Kill Bill"	SZA	
14 January	"Kill Bill"	SZA	
21 January	"Kill Bill"	SZA	
28 January	"Kill Bill"	SZA	
4 February	"Kill Bill"	SZA	
11 February	"Kill Bill"	SZA	
18 February	"Kill Bill"	SZA	
25 February	"Kill Bill"	SZA	
4 March	"Kill Bill"	SZA	
11 March	"Die For You (Remix)"	The Weeknd and Ariana Grande	
18 March	"Die For You (Remix)"	The Weeknd and Ariana Grande	
25 March	"Die For You (Remix)"	The Weeknd and Ariana Grande	
1 April	"Die For You (Remix)"	The Weeknd and Ariana Grande	
8 April	"Die For You (Remix)"	The Weeknd and Ariana Grande	
15 April	"Flower"	Jisoo	
22 April	"Flower"	Jisoo	
29 April	"Cupid"	Fifty Fifty	
6 May	"Cupid"	Fifty Fifty	
13 May	"Cupid"	Fifty Fifty	
20 May	"Cupid"	Fifty Fifty	
27 May	"Cupid"	Fifty Fifty	
3 June	"Cupid"	Fifty Fifty	
10 June	"Cupid"	Fifty Fifty	
17 June	"Cupid"	Fifty Fifty	
24 June	"Cupid"	Fifty Fifty	
1 July	"Cupid"	Fifty Fifty	
8 July	"Tak Segampang Itu"	Anggi Marito	
15 July	"Cupid"	Fifty Fifty	
22 July	"Super Shy"	NewJeans	
29 July	"Seven"	Jungkook featuring Latto	
5 August	"Seven"	Jungkook featuring Latto	
12 August	"Seven"	Jungkook featuring Latto	
19 August	"Seven"	Jungkook featuring Latto	
26 August	"Seven"	Jungkook featuring Latto	
2 September	"Seven"	Jungkook featuring Latto	
9 September	"Seven"	Jungkook featuring Latto	
16 September	"Seven"	Jungkook featuring Latto	
23 September	"Seven"	Jungkook featuring Latto	
30 September	"Seven"	Jungkook featuring Latto	
7 October	"Seven"	Jungkook featuring Latto	
14 October	"3D"	Jungkook featuring Jack Harlow	
21 October	"You & Me"	Jennie	
28 October	"You & Me"	Jennie	
4 November	"Seven"	Jungkook featuring Latto	
11 November	"Seven"	Jungkook featuring Latto	
18 November	"Seven"	Jungkook featuring Latto	
25 November	"Penjaga Hati"	Nadhif Basalamah	
2 December	"Greedy"	Tate McRae	
9 December	"Penjaga Hati"	Nadhif Basalamah	
16 December	"Penjaga Hati"	Nadhif Basalamah	
23 December	"One of the Girls"	The Weeknd, Jennie, and Lily-Rose Depp	
30 December	"One of the Girls"	The Weeknd, Jennie, and Lily-Rose Depp	
