= Henry Moodie =

British singer-songwriter (born 2004)

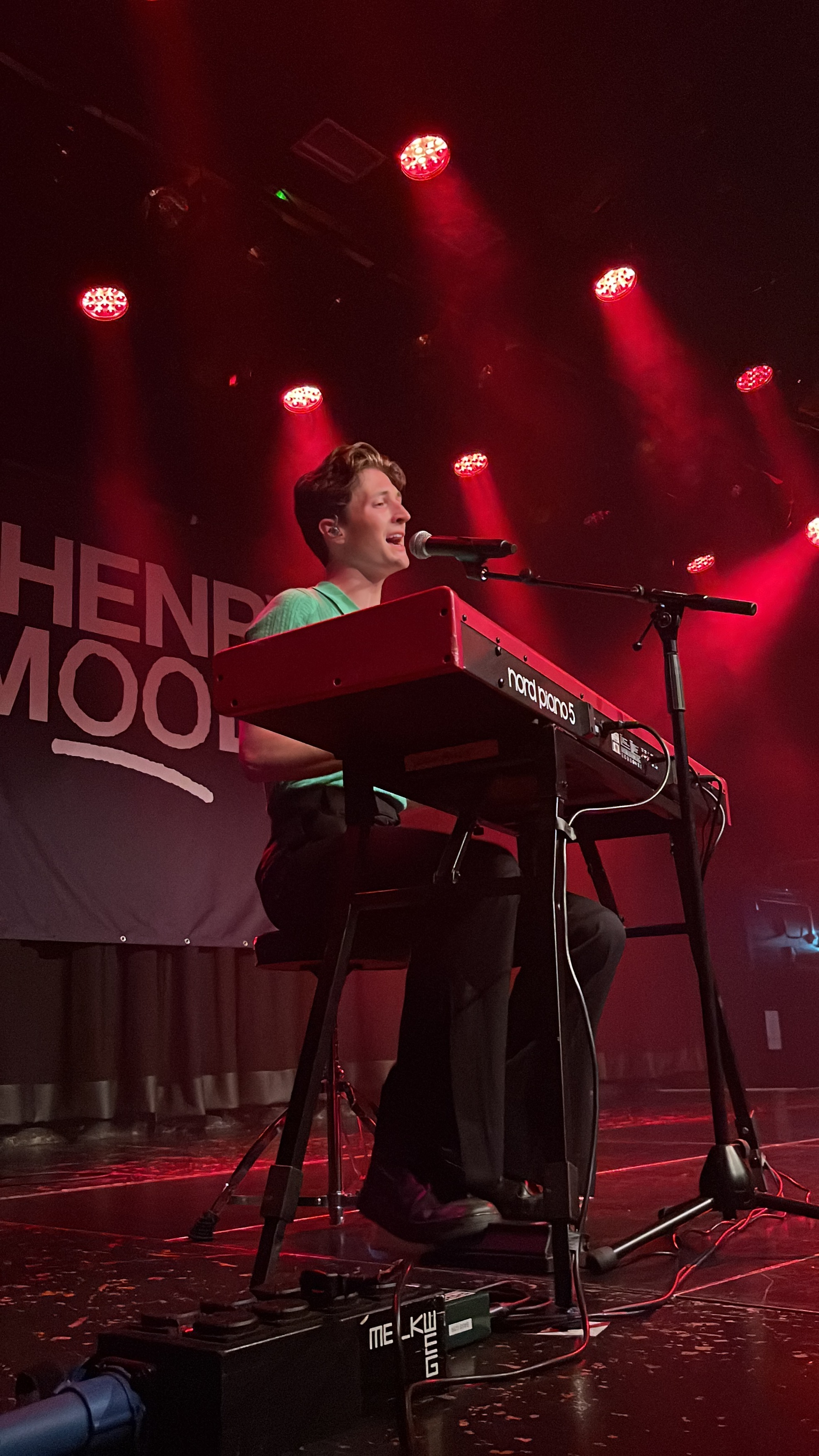
- Moodie on stage in Amsterdam (2023)
- Born: Henry James Moodie; 7 April 2004 (age 22); Guildford, England
- Occupations: Singer, songwriter
- Years active: 2019–present
- Height: 5 ft 11 in (180 cm)

Henry James Moodie (born 7 April 2004) is a British pop singer-songwriter who became popular on TikTok beginning in 2022.

== Early life ==
Moodie was born in Guildford. He began to write his own songs at age 11. At 14, he attended songwriting sessions in London on weekends.

He left school at the age of 16 to play in a band for a while and to complete a songwriting course in Fullham. He originally began his music career on TikTok by doing covers of songs before he began creating his own songs.

== Career ==
=== 2022–2023: In All of My Lonely Nights ===
Moodie released his debut song "You Were There For Me" in August 2022. The song peaked at number 39 in the UK Singles Download Chart. At the end of the year Moodie toured with The Vamps.

His second single "Drunk Text" was released in January 2023. The song peaked at number 56 in Download charts. A year after the songs original release it started gaining attention in Southeast Asia, peaking at number 1 in Malaysia and charting in other countries in the area.

His third single "Eighteen" was released in April 2023. His fourth single "Pick Up The Phone" was released in June 2023. The song peaked at number 88 in the UK Singles Download Chart.

His fifth single "Closure" was released in October 2023. His sixth single "Fight or Flight" was released in November 2023. His seventh single "Orbit" was also released in November 2023.

Moodie released his debut EP In All of My Lonely Nights in January 2024, featuring all his previous singles excluding "Eighteen". After that Moodie went on a tour, the "Lonely Nights Tour" where he performed in Europe and the United States.

=== 2024: Good Old Days ===
In March 2024 he released the song "Beat Up Car". After that he released singles called "Bad Emotions" and "Right Person, Wrong Time". In October he released his second EP Good Old Days. He also embarked on the Good Old Days Tour in October.

=== 2025–present: Mood Swings ===
He released his debut album, Mood Swings, on 24 October 2025. The album includes previously released singles “Right Person, Wrong Time,” “Drunk Text,” “Indigo,” “Pick Up the Phone,” and “Comedown.” The new singles that preceded the album are “Sunday Morning” and “Mood Swings.”

== Personal life ==
Moodie's mother is a therapist who taught him how to channel his emotions. Moodie is Queer. As of May 2026, he is in a relationship with model Joshua Priest.

== Discography ==
=== Studio albums ===
- Mood Swings (2025)

=== Extended plays ===
- In All of My Lonely Nights (2024)
- Good Old Days (2024)

=== Singles ===
List of singles, with selected chart positions
Title	Year	Peak chart positions							Album
Title	Year	UK Down.	CZE Air.	IDN	MYS	SGP	SWE	SWI	Album
"You Were There for Me"	2022	38	—	—	—	—	95	24	In All of My Lonely Nights
"Drunk Text"	2023	53	—	1	1	17	—	—	In All of My Lonely Nights
"Eighteen"	2023	—	53	—	—	—	—	—	Non-album single
"Pick Up the Phone"	2023	87	—	—	—	—	—	—	In All of My Lonely Nights
"Closure"	2023	—	—	—	—	—	—	—	In All of My Lonely Nights
"Fight or Flight"	2023	—	16	—	—	—	—	—	In All of My Lonely Nights
"Orbit"	2023	—	—	—	—	—	—	—	In All of My Lonely Nights
"Beat Up Car"	2024	—	—	—	—	—	—	—	Good Old Days
"Bad Emotions"	2024	—	—	—	—	—	—	—	Good Old Days
"Still Dancing"	2024	—	—	—	—	—	—	—	Good Old Days
"Right Person, Wrong Time"	2024	—	14	—	—	—	—	—	Good Old Days
"Good Old Days"	2024	—	—	—	—	—	—	—	Good Old Days
"The Old Me"	2024	—	—	—	—	—	—	—	Good Old Days
"Indigo"	2025	—	—	—	—	—	—	—	Mood Swings
"Comedown"	2025	—	—	—	—	—	—	—	Mood Swings
"Sunday Morning"	2025	—	13	—	—	—	—	—	Mood Swings
"Mood Swings"	2025	—	—	—	—	—	—	—	Mood Swings
"—" denotes a recording that did not chart or was not released in that territory.
