= Dalto =

Dalto is a surname. Notable people with the surname include:

- Gustavo Dalto (born 1963), Uruguayan football player and manager
- Jorge Dalto (1948–1987), Argentine musician
- Mauro Da Dalto (born 1981), Italian professional road bicycle racer

== See also ==
- Dalto (composer), (born 1949), stage name of Dalto Roberto Medeiros, Brazilian composer and singer
- Dalto (Driebergen), a Dutch korfball club
