= Hong Kong (song) =

Single by the Weeknd and Faye Wong
- Language: English; Cantonese
- Released: October 31, 2026
- Genre: Cantopop; synth-pop; R&B
- Length: 3:36
- Composers: Abel Tesfaye; Salsa Chen
- Lyricists: Abel Tesfaye; Calvin Poon; Yang Lee-deh
- Producers: The Weeknd; Oscar Holter; Sage Skolfield

The Weeknd singles chronology
"Timeless" (remix) (2025)	"Hong Kong" (2026)

Faye Wong singles chronology
"River of Life" (2020)	"Hong Kong" (2026)

Music video
- "Hong Kong" on YouTube

"Hong Kong" is a song by Canadian singer and songwriter the Weeknd featuring Hong Kong singer-songwriter Faye Wong. It premiered on October 24, 2026, at Kai Tak Stadium in Hong Kong during the After Hours til Dawn Tour and samples Wong's song "Monsoon" (季候風). The song was officially released on October 31, 2026, exclusively in Hong Kong.

== Production ==
The song heavily samples both the instrumental and vocals of Faye Wong's Cantopop ballad "Monsoon", from her 1993 studio album, No Regrets.

== Reception ==
"Hong Kong" broke several streaming records in China: the biggest first-day figures (streaming, likes, shares, comments) for a non-Mandarin song on NetEase Cloud Music, and the biggest debut day for a Western male artist on QQ Music.

== Music video ==
The music video for "Hong Kong" was shot by videographer Evan Larsen in Mong Kok and Hong Kong Island. A version of the music video was first screened during the Weeknd's live performance, which featured Chinese fashion influencer Wiwen Wang in scenes of a car driving reminiscent of Hong Kong film. The official music video was uploaded to YouTube on November 12, 2026, which co-stars supermodel Ming Xi and features additional scenes in a karaoke bar.

Lifestyle Asia compared it particularly to the style of Hong Kong filmmaker Wong Kar-wai. Larsen told South China Morning Post that the video had been shot for about a week before its showing in concert.

== Artwork ==
The cover artwork features an archival image of Hong Kong by cinematographer Christopher Doyle. Doyle served as cinematographer for the 1994 film Chungking Express, which stars Wong.

== Credits and personnel ==
Credits adapted from the single's liner notes, provided from Spotify.

- The Weeknd – vocals, producer, English lyrics, composition
- Faye Wong – vocals
- Salsa Chen – composition
- Calvin Poon – Cantonese lyrics
- Yang Lee-deh – Cantonese lyrics
- Oscar Holter – producer, arrangement
- Sage Skolfield – producer, arrangement, engineer, mixing, mastering

== Charts ==
Chart performance for "Hong Kong"
Chart (2026)	Peak position
Hong Kong (Billboard)	1
Japan Hot Overseas (Billboard Japan)	11
Malaysia (IFPI)	1
Malaysia International (RIM)	1
Singapore (RIAS)	2
Taiwan (Billboard)	16
