= Die with a Smile =

2024 single by Lady Gaga and Bruno Mars

Single by Lady Gaga and Bruno Mars
- B-side: "Die with a Smile" (Instrumental)
- Released: August 16, 2024
- Recorded: 2024
- Studio: Shampoo Press & Curl (Los Angeles)
- Genre: Pop; pop-soul; soft rock
- Length: 4:11
- Label: Interscope
- Songwriters: Bruno Mars; Lady Gaga; Dernst Emile II; James Fauntleroy; Andrew Watt
- Producers: Bruno Mars; Lady Gaga; D'Mile; Andrew Watt

Lady Gaga singles chronology
"Sweet Sounds of Heaven" (2023)	"Die with a Smile" (2024)	"Disease" (2024)

Bruno Mars singles chronology
"After Last Night" (2022)	"Die with a Smile" (2024)	"APT." (2024)

Music video
- "Die with a Smile" on YouTube

"Die with a Smile" is a song by American singer-songwriters Lady Gaga and Bruno Mars. It was released as a standalone single on August 16, 2024, through Interscope Records. It was later included as the closing track of Gaga's 2025 studio album Mayhem. Mars developed the track with Dernst "D'Mile" Emile II and James Fauntleroy in 2021; three years later, he presented it to Gaga, and the four completed it the same day. The final version was written by Gaga, Mars, D-Mile, Andrew Watt, and Fauntleroy, and it was produced by the first four.

The song is a sentimental ballad that blends pop, pop-soul, and soft rock, with country music influences. Some critics compared the song's style to 1970s ballads, Gaga's album Joanne (2016) and single "Shallow" (2018), and Mars's Silk Sonic project. Lyrically, it focuses on the desire to remain with a loved one in the face of an impending catastrophe. Critics praised the song's vocals, instrumentation and emotional lyrics.

"Die with a Smile" achieved significant commercial success. On Spotify, it became the longest-reigning daily number-one song, the fastest track to surpass four billion streams, and the most-streamed song of 2025. The track spent 18 weeks atop the Billboard Global 200 and topped the charts in more than 30 countries, including the United States, Canada, New Zealand, and the Netherlands. It was certified multi-diamond in Brazil by Pro-Música Brasil and diamond in France by the National Syndicate of Phonographic Publishing, in Poland by the Polish Society of the Phonographic Industry and in Greece by IFPI Greece.

Mars and Daniel Ramos directed the music video, which was released simultaneously with the song. The video features Gaga playing piano and Mars playing guitar as they sing together in a studio inspired by 1970s television. The duo gave their first live performance of the song at a Mars concert in Los Angeles in August 2024. In the same year, a performance in Las Vegas was released officially on digital platforms. Both artists performed solo renditions at various live shows, including select dates of Bruno Mars Live (2022–2024), Gaga's The Art of Personal Chaos (2025–2026), the Super Bowl LX halftime show, and her reimagined version of the song for Mayhem Requiem (2026). "Die with a Smile" was nominated for Song of the Year and won Best Pop Duo/Group Performance at the 67th Annual Grammy Awards.

== Background and development ==
Bruno Mars first developed "Die with a Smile" in 2021, writing parts of the first verse and chorus before leaving it as an unfinished demo. American record producer and songwriter D'Mile recalled that Mars "had the hook, at least the lyrics or theme to the hook, about being next to someone if the world was ending". Mars was, however, unsure how to develop it further and held the idea for a year before its release.

According to American singer-songwriter James Fauntleroy, Mars initially considered pitching an early version of the song for the 2024 film Joker: Folie à Deux in which Lady Gaga stars, or her companion album to the film, Harlequin (2024). Mars, Fauntleroy, and D'Mile then resumed working on the track. D'Mile said they worked on "two or three" versions—rather than the usual 100—and that the second was already close to the final arrangement. They experimented with different chords for the verse before Mars settled on a progression and the hook chords on guitar, while D'Mile played bass.

American record producer Andrew Watt was invited, alongside Gaga and American entrepreneur and venture capitalist Michael Polansky to hear the song at Mars's studio. During the session, Gaga, who was recording her upcoming studio album, was "blown away" by the track. Gaga praised Mars's talent and musicianship; Mars described the collaboration as a privilege.

== Writing and recording ==
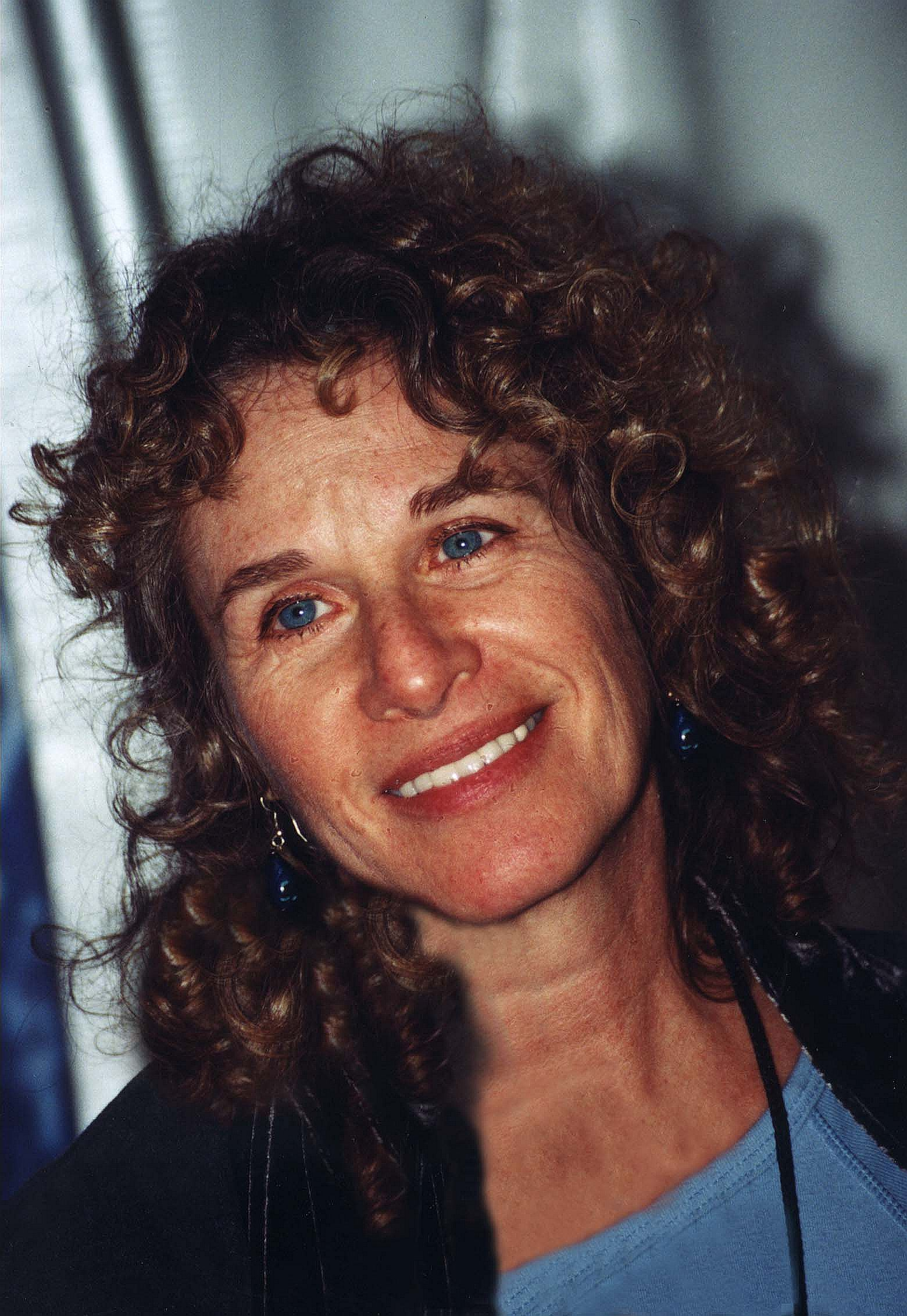
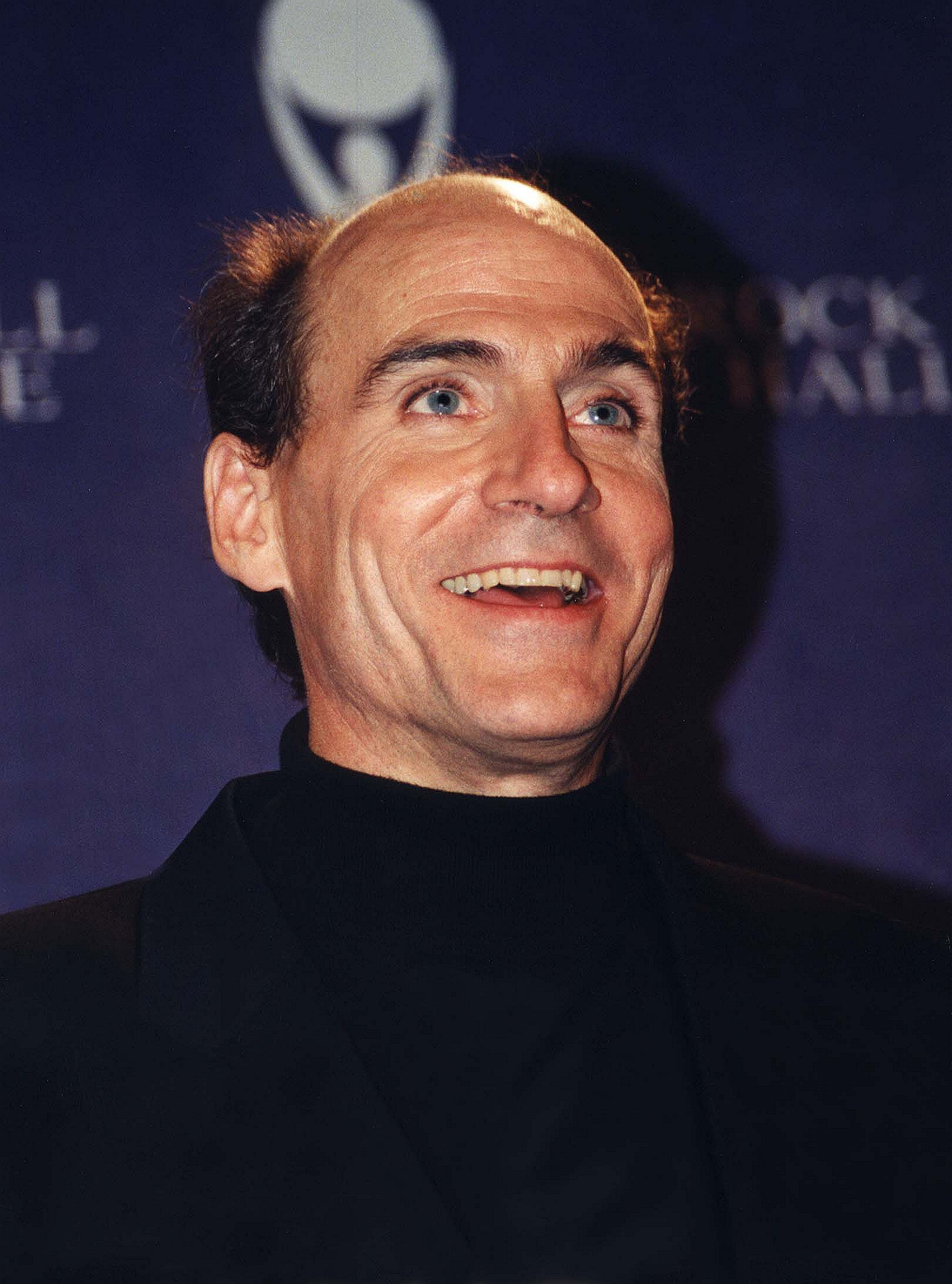
Lady Gaga cited the collaborations between Carole King (left) and James Taylor (right) as a major inspiration for the song.

Gaga visited Mars late at night to work on the song. After writing the second verse together, they recorded until the early morning, Mars closely guiding Gaga's vocals to match his intended sound. She also mentioned that they aimed for the harmonies to feel "very 1970s" and were inspired by the collaborations between Carole King and James Taylor. In an interview with the Los Angeles Times, Gaga revealed that she was initially intrigued by the idea of a song centered on what people would do if faced with the end of the world. She added:

I just remember feeling like it was a song that people needed to hear. I write music all the time, and sometimes you feel like you're making something that some people will like. But there's other times that you work on something and you just know it's gonna deeply speak to all different kinds of people.

Music journalists affirmed that, although the title evoked associations with Joker: Folie à Deux, the session focused on creating "a love song that would be for the ages". According to Watt, the recording of "Die with a Smile" followed an "old-school" approach, with Mars and Fauntleroy playing as Gaga wrote out the chords and bass changes. He added that the team developed the song's harmonies together. The recording featured drums, bass, guitars and vocals, giving the track a raw sound.

The team worked on the song until 5 a.m., despite Gaga having something scheduled for 8 a.m. Watt said the competitive atmosphere in the studio was nevertheless positive, and compared Gaga and Mars's interaction to that of Quincy Jones and Michael Jackson. After the instrumental arrangement was finished, Gaga recorded her vocals, with Mars helping her during the process. Fauntleroy later recalled that Gaga went to the piano to learn the song's chords and write them down. Watt and Gaga later re-recorded parts of her vocals, while he and D’Mile continued working on the track over the following weeks.

== Release ==
The duo announced, on August 15, 2024, that the song and its accompanying music video would be released the following day. Simultaneously, they revealed the single's cover art, which depicts them in coordinating red-and-blue retro Western outfits, Gaga holding a cigarette and Mars wearing a white cowboy hat.

On August 16, Interscope Records released the single via digital download and streaming platforms. It was also sent for radio airplay in Italy by EMI Records and Warner Music Group. A CD single was also issued in Germany, the United Kingdom, and the United States by Interscope and Streamline. On August 19, the track was serviced for adult contemporary and hot adult contemporary formats by Interscope. The label also sent the song to contemporary hit radio on the following day. The 7-inch vinyl was released in Canada on November 29, in Germany on December 9, and in France and the United Kingdom on December 13. On February 8, 2026, Gaga performed an abridged salsa version of "Die with a Smile", as a guest performer, at Bad Bunny's Super Bowl LX halftime show. That version of the song was released on the same day on streaming services.

Although "Die with a Smile" was initially promoted as a standalone single by Gaga's representatives, she later confirmed in a December 2024 interview with the Los Angeles Times that it would appear on Mayhem, describing it as "a huge part" and the "missing piece". Gaga added that she chose it as the closing track to give the record a "sense of peace", noting it was the last song she wrote. The song was also included on Mars's first compilation album, Collaborations (2026).

== Composition and production ==
"Die with a Smile"
A sample of the song's chorus, featuring Gaga and Mars harmonizing, reflecting the track's pop, pop-soul, and soft rock style.

"Die with a Smile" is a pop, pop-soul, and soft rock song that evokes the emotional style of a sentimental ballad with influences from country music. The song was composed in the key of A major with a slow tempo of 52 beats per minute in 6/8 time signature. Billboard's Kyle Denis described the song as a "soaring ballad that blends pop, soul, country and rock", and Luisa Calle from Billboard Español said it combines Gaga's emotive lyrical style with Mars's smooth R&B influence. The song was written by Mars, Gaga, Dernst Emile II, James Fauntleroy, and Andrew Watt and produced by all but Fauntleroy. Mars and Watt played the guitar, while Gaga played the piano and D'Mile was in charge of the bass and drums. It was recorded at Shampoo Press & Curl Studios, in Los Angeles, by Charles Moniz and Paul LaMalfa, who also served as engineers with Marco Sonzini. The track was mixed by Serban Ghenea at MixStar Studios in Virginia Beach, Virginia. Randy Merrill mastered it at Sterling Sound in New York City.

"Die with a Smile" opens with Mars taking the first verse, after which both vocalists play off each other for the remainder of the track. It features what Variety's Jem Aswad described as "soaring vocals, a big chorus, gently strummed guitars", culminating in a "sky-scraping climax" on the final chorus. Lyrically, it is an intense declaration of love that explores the narrators' feelings for each other amid a hypothetical end-of-the-world scenario. Gaga has described it as an "apocalyptic love song". The chorus conveys a sense of urgency in the relationship with its emphasis on the desire to be "next to you" if "the world was ending" or "our time on Earth was through". Capital's Abbie Reynolds described lines such as "Nobody's promised tomorrow" and "I'ma love you every night like it's the last night" as reminders not to take love for granted. Jake Viswanath of Bustle compared the song's lyrical perspective to Gaga's 2011 single "The Edge of Glory", and Billboard Argentina displayed its focus on "finding happiness and peace amid adversity". Writing for Marie Claire, Candela Barbieri viewed the song as presenting love as a refuge in the midst of chaos and uncertainty. Talking about the lyrics, Gaga added that although singing about dying does not naturally align with smiling, it makes sense in the context of the song because it reflects the sweetness and emotional meaning behind what they are expressing.

Critics noted that the song's sound was influenced by 1970s ballads. Los Angeles Times writer Mikael Wood said it evokes classic duets such as Patti LaBelle and Michael McDonald's "On My Own" (1986) and Diana Ross and Lionel Richie's "Endless Love" (1981). Reviewers Joey Nolfi and Justin Curto at Entertainment Weekly and Vulture, respectively, noticed similarities to Gaga's single "Shallow" (2018) from the A Star Is Born soundtrack. Nolfi affirmed the song was inspired by the 1960s and 1970s pop ballads as well as Gaga's earlier work on Joanne (2016), while Curto dubbed it as a "vintage rock ballad". Ed Power for The Irish Times likened the track to James Bond theme songs and to Gaga's collaborations with Tony Bennett, (Note: Besides standalone recordings, Gaga and Bennett released two collaborative albums consisting of their renditions of jazz standards: Cheek to Cheek (2014) and Love for Sale (2021).) and NME's Surej Singh compared its "soaring" chorus to Mars's Silk Sonic project. Shaad D'Souza writing for The New York Times further connected it to Mars's early material, influenced by wedding songs. Clash's Robin Murray considered the song's slow, echoing guitar chords similar to shoegaze music, blending Lee Hazlewood's traditional songwriting with dreamy sounds comparable to Slowdive.

== Critical reception ==
"Die with a Smile" was met with critical acclaim. Reviewers highlighted the vocal interplay between Gaga and Mars and their restrained, cohesive duet dynamic. Vulture's Craig Jenkins and Kristen Hé observed the duo's voices are complementary. Alexa Camp of Slant Magazine described it as a nostalgic take on traditional love songs, while Sam Damshenas of Gay Times described it as a dramatic pop-rock ballad with a cinematic quality.

Reviewers described "Die with a Smile" as a contemporary reinterpretation of 1970s duet traditions. The song features a polished production and was described as a romantic, lightly apocalyptic slow dance with vintage soul, R&B and soft-rock influences. Neil Z. Yeung, writing for AllMusic, predicted it would become a classic song for Gaga, while Jenesaispop's Jordi Bardají characterized it as a timeless ballad. Yeung praised the song for its simple yet sublime quality, while Billboard's Hannah Daily dubbed the track a "late-stage song of the summer contender." Paul Grein for Billboard described the track as an "instant smash" and Aswad highlighted the high-profile collaboration and praised the vocals, chorus and instrumentation.

Other assessments were less positive. Adam White of The Independent considered the song somewhat underwhelming given its success, while praising its tender approach and the performances of both artists. Others described it as a satisfying love ballad that, while enjoyable, offered little artistic progression for either artist. The A.V. Club's Drew Gillis described the track as competent but unremarkable, with concerns that it fades into the background and that Mars's melody dominates while Gaga plays a secondary role. Shaad D'Souza of The New York Times pointed to the song's lounge-inspired aesthetic, while John Doran from The Quietus labelled it an artificial mid-tempo ballad that lacks emotional impact.

=== Year-end lists ===
"Die with a Smile" was included in several year-end lists. USA Today ranked it fifth, praising its retro-inspired exploration of enduring love, the complementary styles of the performers, and Mars's rhythmic production, particularly its use of drums to enhance emotional intensity. The Los Angeles Times placed it at number 17, and Billboard ranked it 21st. The latter complimented its "timeless" production, vocal performances, and replay value. Billboard Philippines dubbed the duo's vocals as "passionate", and Uproxx also listed the song among the year's best, citing its chemistry and vocal delivery.

Critics' year-end rankings
Publication	List	Rank	Ref.
Billboard	The 100 Best Songs of 2024	21	
Billboard Philippines	The 50 Best Songs of 2024	—N/a	
Los Angeles Times	The 30 Best Songs of 2024	17	
New York Post	The 10 Best Songs of 2024	4	
Uproxx	The Best Songs of 2024	—N/a	
USA Today	The 10 Best Songs of 2024	5	
Vogue	The 24 Best Songs of 2024	—N/a	

=== Comments on the song's placement within Mayhem ===
Gaga described Mayhem as an album that moves between contrasting styles and sounds before resolving in love, framing the album as a complete experience fusing various genres.

The inclusion of "Die with a Smile" as Mayhem's closing track received mixed reviews from critics. The song was regarded as an effective album closer by Dork and Elle music journalists. Variety's Steven Horowitz noted its placement aligns with the album's closing sequence of ballads, while David Cobbald from The Line of Best Fit suggested that its inclusion raises questions over whether Mayhem was adjusted to accommodate it. Donovan Livesey writing for MusicOMH framed it as "reflective" and described it as an "almost cinematic" closing section.

Other critics argued that the track did not fit with the rest of Mayhem, suggesting its inclusion may have been influenced by its popularity. Exclaim!'s staff described it as out of place, implying its commercial success led to its inclusion. Nick Levine for NME dubbed it a "palate cleanser", while Stephen Daw from Billboard characterized it as an "afterthought" and a softer closing moment. Mark Richardson from The Wall Street Journal and Murray suggested it introduces a tonal contrast despite its individual appeal. Atwood Magazine's staff and Sam Rosenberg from Paste described its placement as inadequate.

== Commercial performance ==
=== Americas ===
"Die with a Smile" sold over 14,000 digital copies in the United States during its first four days of availability. The track debuted at number three on the US Billboard Hot 100 chart for the week dated August 31, 2024. It reached number two on the Hot 100, with 45.3 million radio airplay impressions, 22.6 million streams, and 16,000 copies sold. Three new versions were released during the tracking week and discounted to 69 cents on the iTunes store. After selling 6,000 copies, "Die with a Smile" reached the number one spot on the Hot 100 for the chart dated January 11, 2025, garnering 59.7 million radio listeners as well as 27.1 million streams. The single became Gaga's sixth chart-topper and Mars's ninth; it spent five non-consecutive weeks at the top of the Hot 100.

Gaga became the third artist in history to achieve multiple U.S. number one songs in three different decades, after Michael and Janet Jackson. "Die with a Smile" was the longest-charting song with a female lead, and the longest-charting duet ever in the top 10 of the Hot 100. "Die with a Smile" dropped off the Hot 100 in its 60th week, due to Billboard's updated chart rules, removing songs outside the top 10 for more than 52 weeks. The 60 weeks spent on the aforementioned chart is a longevity record for both artists and also the most for a duet between a female and male artist. Gaga became the fifth act to achieve at least one number one in each of the 2000s, 2010s, and 2020s on Pop Airplay. The single topped the 2025 Hot 100 Year-End chart, becoming the first male-female duet to do so.

"Die with a Smile" debuted at number nine on the Canadian Hot 100 and subsequently climbed to the top, marking Gaga's sixth number one hit and Mars's fifth. The song was certified eight-times platinum by Music Canada (MC). In Brazil, the song peaked at number four on the Billboard Brasil Hot 100 and received an eleven-times diamond certification from Pro-Música Brasil (PMB).

=== Europe ===
"Die with a Smile" entered the UK Singles Chart at number seven, marking Gaga's 15th top-ten song and Mars's 11th. In its ninth week on the chart, it reached number two and spent a year on the chart. The British Phonographic Industry (BPI) awarded it triple platinum certification. In Ireland, "Die with a Smile" also achieved the biggest debut of the week by entering at number 13, and in its sixth week, it peaked at number three.

"Die with a Smile" topped the chart in the Flemish Region of Belgium, and in Greece and Portugal. The song also reached number one in the Netherlands, including both Dutch Top 40 and Single Top 100; on the latter chart, Gaga became the first artist to achieve a chart-topping song in three different decades in the country. The track also became Gaga's fourth number one track and Mars's second in Switzerland, remaining in that position for four consecutive weeks. It was Gaga's fifth number one single, and Mars's second, in Norway.

"Die with a Smile" reached number two in the Walloon Region, Sweden, and on the Polish Airplay Top 100. It entered the top three in Lithuania, peaking at number four in Germany and number seven in France. The song was awarded a platinum certification by IFPI Switzerland, six times platinum by the Associação Fonográfica Portuguesa (AFP), and diamond by IFPI Greece. In Poland and France, the Polish Society of the Phonographic Industry (ZPAV) and National Syndicate of Phonographic Publishing (SNEP) awarded "Die with a Smile" a diamond certification, respectively.

=== Asia and Oceania ===
"Die with a Smile" met widespread commercial success in Asia, reaching number one on the weekly charts in Indonesia and Malaysia, as well as in the Philippines, where Gaga and Mars became the first non-Filipino act to reach number one on the Philippines Hot 100 since the chart's reintroduction in July 2024. It became the international song with the longest run at the top spot in the Philippines during the 2024 calendar year. Within the Middle East, the track reached number one in Lebanon, Saudi Arabia, and the United Arab Emirates.

In Australia, "Die with a Smile" debuted at number 10 on the ARIA Singles Chart, becoming Gaga's 16th and Mars's 17th top-10 hit. It then climbed to number two, where it remained for two consecutive weeks. It was certified eight times platinum by the Australian Recording Industry Association (ARIA). In New Zealand, the song debuted at number one on the Top 40 Singles Chart, marking Gaga's fourth number one hit in the country and Mars's sixth, and it remained at the top for nine consecutive weeks. The single was certified six times platinum by Recorded Music NZ (RMNZ).

=== International ===
In 2024, "Die with a Smile" ranked 14th on the International Federation of the Phonographic Industry's (IFPI) Global Single Chart, with 1.08 billion subscription-stream equivalents. In its first week, the song garnered 75.1 million streams across several platforms and sold 31,000 copies, debuting at number two on the Global 200 chart. It was Gaga's first top ten hit and Mars's third since the chart's inception. In its second week, the single topped the Billboard Global 200 and Global Excl. US singles charts, becoming the first chart-topper for both artists, having accumulated 97.2 million streams globally and selling 12,000 copies. The track spent a total of eighteen weeks atop the chart and it is tied with Huntrix's "Golden" (2025) as the second longest-reigning overall (non-holiday) number-one song in the chart's history.

"Die with a Smile" achieved major global streaming success across multiple platforms. The song topped global year-end streaming charts on YouTube, Spotify, and Deezer in 2025. It ranked second on the Billboard Global 200 year-end chart and was named the fourth most successful single of 2025 by the International Federation of the Phonographic Industry (IFPI), with 1.86 billion streams. The track set several streaming records, including becoming the fastest track to reach 1 billion streams on Spotify in under 100 days and the fastest to reach 4 billion streams on the platform. It also spent the most days at number one on the Spotify Global daily chart, surpassing Tones and I's "Dance Monkey" (2019), and was the most streamed song in a single week over a sustained twenty-week period exceeding 100 million streams.

== Music video ==
Gaga and Mars on the retro television-stage set, wearing Western-inspired outfits; Gaga described her cigarette as a subversive character choice.

The music video for "Die with a Smile" premiered on Gaga's YouTube channel alongside the song's debut. Directed by Mars and Daniel Ramos, the video depicts Mars and Gaga performing on a retro television stage, dressed in the outfits from the single's cover art. Gaga wears red tights and a Dolly Parton-inspired hairstyle, while Mars wears a blue suit and white cowboy hat. The duo is seen performing the song on a retro stage of a TV studio set. Accompanied by a live band and surrounded by faceless mannequins, they perform for a black-and-white camera before the video ends with a heart-shaped frame around them.

Gaga stated the video portrays her and Mars as a veteran television variety-show couple, and was inspired by similar acts and programs. The singer emphasized that her character is not portrayed merely as a traditional "wife" figure; instead, she asserts agency and remains "one of the boys". In the video, Gaga's character smokes a cigarette just before her first verse, which Gaga said was because she "wanted to create the semblance of a character who had something to say. And it's slightly subversive — like, you're talking about the world ending and I'm having a cigarette. There's something kind of dark about it."

Critics described the video as retro and with a Nashville-theme, drawing comparisons to duos such as Elton John and Kiki Dee, or Sonny Bono and Cher. It could also reference the relationship between Joker and Harley Quinn in Joker: Folie à Deux. Fashion writers highlighted its 1970s Western styling, particularly Gaga's blue minidress designed by Ashley Eva Brock and makeup using Haus Labs products. Mars wore a blue suit with a red button-down shirt and sharp lapels, complementing Gaga's outfit. Their matching outfits evoked those worn by Dolly Parton and Porter Wagoner during their duets. Calum Slingerland of Exclaim! dubbed the video "unapologetically schmaltzy", and The A.V. Club's Drew Gillis found it visually unremarkable. The video surpassed one billion YouTube views in April 2025, and was nominated for Best Music Video and Video of the Year at the 2025 iHeartRadio Music Awards and 2025 MTV Video Music Awards, respectively.

== Live performances ==
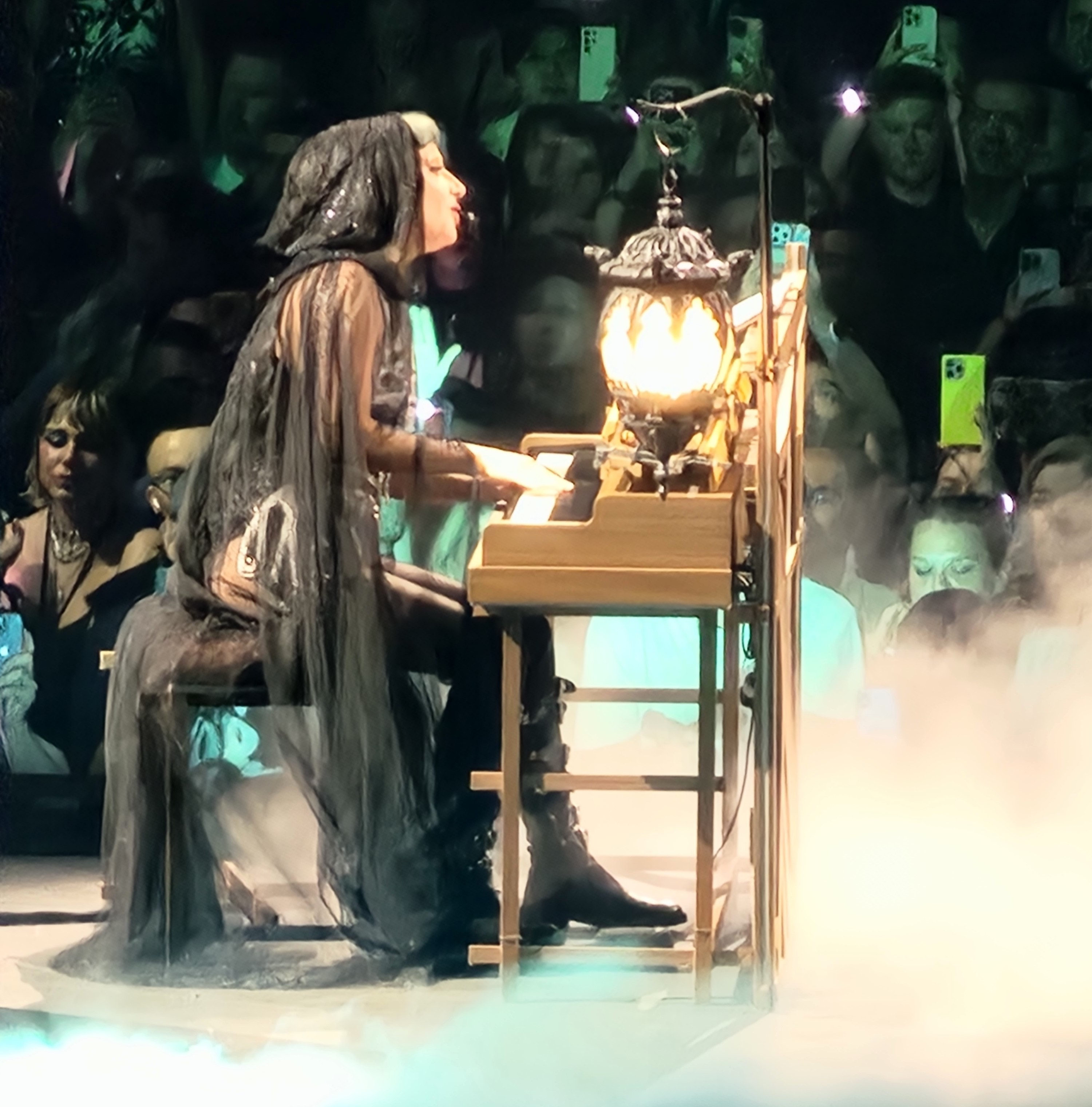
Gaga performing "Die with a Smile" during the Mayhem Ball tour

Gaga and Mars performed "Die with a Smile" live for the first time on August 15, 2024, as part of Mars's show for the opening of Intuit Dome in Los Angeles. After Mars welcomed Gaga to the stage as part of the show's encore, they replicated the song's music video on stage, with Mars at the guitar and Gaga playing the keys. Rolling Stone's Brittany Spanos described the performance as "sublime" and "simple", praising the duo's powerful vocals. Thania Garcia of Variety wrote that Mars "saved the best [...] for last" by bringing out Gaga, who sang "with fervent passion, building up to the song's big chorus where the pair of hitmakers' powerful vocals melt as one". Jason P. Frank of Vulture focused on the pair's powerful vocal delivery during the debut performance. On August 27, 2024, the duo performed the song together at the concert residency, Bruno Mars at Park MGM (2016–2025) in Las Vegas. On October 29, 2024, Gaga announced via her social media that a recording of the performance would be released as part of a double feature alongside the music video for her single "Disease" in celebration of Halloween.

In 2024, Mars performed a solo piano version of "Die with a Smile" as part of a medley. He first sang it during the Brazil leg of his Bruno Mars Live tour (2022–2024). Gaga's first solo performance of the song took place on September 30, 2024, at The Belasco in Los Angeles, within a set that mostly consisted of songs from her album Harlequin. Gaga also sang the track solo during a Christmas special of Carpool Karaoke, released on Apple TV+ on December 15, 2024. She and Mars were scheduled to perform "Die with a Smile" at the 67th Annual Grammy Awards on February 2, 2025, but due to the California wildfires that occurred in the days leading up to the ceremony, they instead delivered a tribute by performing "California Dreamin'" (1965). Gaga also performed "Die with a Smile" during The Art of Personal Chaos concerts (2025–2026). In the earlier iteration of the show, which included a headlining set at Coachella, she sang the song solo at a piano decorated with skulls. The show was later revamped for the Mayhem Ball tour, where Gaga retained the song on the set list and continued to perform it on piano.

On February 8, 2026, Gaga made a guest appearance during Bad Bunny's Super Bowl LX halftime show, where she performed an abridged salsa version of "Die with a Smile", supported by the group Los Sobrinos. The segment took place during a legally binding onstage wedding ceremony involving a couple who had previously invited Bad Bunny to attend their wedding. In April, Mars added "Die with a Smile" to the setlist of the Romantic Tour (2026). The song closed Gaga's concert film and live album Apple Music Live: Mayhem Requiem, released on May 14, 2026. It was recorded during an invite-only performance at the Wiltern Theatre in Los Angeles in January. She performed a version substantially reworked around elements of Kavinsky's "Nightcall" (2010), with altered arrangement and tempo that moved the song toward an electro-funk sound. Mars's vocal part was clipped before Gaga entered with vocals processed through a vocoder.

== Cover versions ==
On September 24, 2024, Filipino singer Julie Anne San Jose shared a cover of "Die with a Smile" on her Instagram account, performing vocals, guitar, piano, and drums. Italian singer Damiano David sang a rendition during a SiriusXM Hits 1 session at the network's New York studios, accompanied by backing vocalists and a live band. NME's Tom Skinner described the performance as "intimate yet soaring". On October 18, British singer Perrie Edwards covered "Die with a Smile" on BBC Radio 1's Live Lounge, which was later released on streaming services. In 2025, American singers Jessica Sanchez and Benson Boone also performed the song. Sanchez sang it during the September 23 finale of the 20th season of America's Got Talent and Boone performed it on September 30 during one night of his American Heart World Tour (2025-2026). In the same year, Norwegian musician Sondre Lerche released a version of the song as part of his annual tradition to cover a pop song during the holiday season, in partnership with producer Matias Tellez and Stereogum.

== Accolades ==
"Die with a Smile" has won 12 awards from 28 nominations as of May 2026. In 2024, the song won International Anglo Song of the Year and International Collaboration of the Year at the Musa Awards. In the same year, the track won International Collaboration of the Year at the NRJ Music Awards and was nominated for Best Collaboration at the MTV Europe Music Awards. In 2025, the duet received four nominations at the American Music Awards of 2025, winning Collaboration of the Year and Favorite Music Video. The single won Best Collaboration at the 2025 iHeartRadio Music Awards. "Die with a Smile" received two nominations at the 67th Annual Grammy Awards, including Song of the Year and Best Pop Duo/Group Performance, winning the latter. D'Mile was nominated for Producer of the Year, Non-Classical for his work on it, along with other projects. In 2026, "Die with a Smile" was nominated for International Song of the Year at the 46th Brit Awards.

List of accolades
Organization	Year	Category	Result	Ref.
American Music Awards	2025	Song of the Year	Nominated	
American Music Awards	2025	Collaboration of the Year	Won	
American Music Awards	2025	Favorite Pop Song	Nominated	
American Music Awards	2025	Favorite Music Video	Won	
ASCAP Pop Music Awards	2025	Most Performed Songs	Won	
ASCAP Pop Music Awards	2026	Song of the Year	Won	
BMI Pop Awards	2025	Most-Performed Songs of the Year	Won	
Brit Awards	2026	International Song of the Year	Nominated	
GAFFA Awards (Denmark)	2025	International Single of the Year	Nominated	
Grammy Awards	2025	Song of the Year	Nominated	
Grammy Awards	2025	Best Pop Duo/Group Performance	Won	
Hungarian Music Awards	2025	Foreign Record of the Year	Nominated	
iHeartRadio Music Awards	2025	Best Collaboration	Won	
iHeartRadio Music Awards	2025	Best Music Video	Nominated	
MTV Europe Music Awards	2024	Best Collaboration	Nominated	
MTV Video Music Awards	2025	Video of the Year	Nominated	
MTV Video Music Awards	2025	Song of the Year	Nominated	
MTV Video Music Awards	2025	Best Collaboration	Won	
MTV Video Music Awards	2025	Best Pop	Nominated	
Musa Awards	2024	International Anglo Song of the Year	Won	
Musa Awards	2024	International Collaboration of the Year	Won	
Music Awards Japan	2025	Best International Pop Song in Japan	Nominated	
Music Awards Japan	2025	Best of Listeners' Choice: International Song	Nominated	
New Music Awards	2025	AC Song of the Year	Nominated	
Nickelodeon Kids' Choice Awards	2025	Favorite Music Collaboration	Nominated	
NRJ Music Awards	2024	International Collaboration of the Year	Won	
Rockbjörnen	2025	Foreign Song of the Year	Nominated	
RTHK International Pop Poll Awards	2024	Top Ten International Gold Songs	Won	

== Credits and personnel ==
Credits are adapted from the liner notes of Mayhem.

Recording

- Recorded at Shampoo Press & Curl Studios (Los Angeles)
- Mixed at MixStar Studios (Virginia Beach, Virginia)
- Mastered at Sterling Sound (New York City)

Personnel

- Bruno Mars – lead vocals, songwriting, production, guitar
- Lady Gaga – lead vocals, songwriting, production, piano
- D'Mile – songwriting, production, bass, drums
- Andrew Watt – songwriting, production, guitar
- James Fauntleroy – songwriting
- Charles Moniz – recording, engineering
- Paul LaMalfa – recording, engineering
- Marco Sonzini – additional engineering
- Alex Resoagli – recording engineering assistance
- Tyler Harris – recording engineering assistance
- Serban Ghenea – mixing
- Bryce Bordone – mix engineering
- Randy Merrill – mastering

== Charts ==
=== Weekly charts ===
List of chart positions
Chart (2024–2026)	Peak position
Argentina Hot 100 (Billboard)	10
Australia (ARIA)	2
Austria (Ö3 Austria Top 40)	2
Belarus Airplay (TopHit)	67
Belgium (Ultratop 50 Flanders)	1
Belgium (Ultratop 50 Wallonia)	2
Bolivia Airplay (Monitor Latino)	4
Brazil Hot 100 (Billboard)	4
Bulgaria Airplay (PROPHON)	4
Canada Hot 100 (Billboard)	1
Canada All-Format Airplay (Billboard)	3
Canada AC (Billboard)	1
Canada CHR/Top 40 (Billboard)	3
Canada Hot AC (Billboard)	1
Chile Airplay (Monitor Latino)	7
CIS Airplay (TopHit)	12
Colombia Anglo Airplay (National-Report)	1
Costa Rica Streaming (FONOTICA)	7
Croatia International Airplay (Top lista)	1
Czech Republic Airplay (ČNS IFPI)	1
Czech Republic Singles Digital (ČNS IFPI)	5
Denmark (Tracklisten)	3
Dominican Republic Anglo Airplay (Monitor Latino)	1
Ecuador (Billboard)	9
Egypt (IFPI)	16
Estonia Airplay (TopHit)	1
Finland (Suomen virallinen lista)	12
France (SNEP)	7
Germany (GfK)	4
Global 200 (Billboard)	1
Greece International (IFPI)	1
Guatemala Airplay (Monitor Latino)	14
Hong Kong (Billboard)	2
Hungary (Rádiós Top 40)	1
Hungary (Single Top 40)	7
Iceland (Tónlistinn)	1
India International (IMI)	1
Indonesia (ASIRI)	1
Ireland (IRMA)	3
Israel (Mako Hitlist)	6
Italy (FIMI)	16
Jamaica Airplay (JAMMS)	9
Japan Hot 100 (Billboard)	38
Kazakhstan Airplay (TopHit)	28
Latin America Airplay (Monitor Latino)	2
Latvia Airplay (LaIPA)	3
Latvia Streaming (LaIPA)	2
Lebanon (Lebanese Top 20)	1
Lithuania (AGATA)	2
Luxembourg (Billboard)	1
Malaysia (Billboard)	1
Middle East and North Africa (IFPI)	1
Mexico Airplay (Monitor Latino)	5
Moldova Airplay (TopHit)	14
Netherlands (Dutch Top 40)	1
Netherlands (Single Top 100)	1
New Zealand (Recorded Music NZ)	1
Nicaragua Airplay (Monitor Latino)	11
Nigeria (TurnTable Top 100)	50
North Africa (IFPI)	10
Norway (VG-lista)	1
Panama International (PRODUCE)	11
Paraguay Airplay (Monitor Latino)	3
Peru (Billboard)	2
Philippines Hot 100 (Billboard Philippines)	1
Poland Airplay (OLiS)	2
Poland Streaming (OLiS)	3
Portugal (AFP)	1
Romania Airplay (UPFR)	3
Romania Airplay (Media Forest)	4
Romania TV Airplay (Media Forest)	1
Russia Airplay (TopHit)	44
San Marino Airplay (SMRTV Top 50)	2
Saudi Arabia (IFPI)	1
Serbia Airplay (Radiomonitor)	9
Singapore (RIAS)	1
Slovakia Airplay (ČNS IFPI)	5
Slovakia Singles Digital (ČNS IFPI)	3
Slovenia Airplay (Radiomonitor)	2
South Africa Streaming (TOSAC)	1
South Korea (Circle)	15
South Korea (Billboard)	65
Spain (Promusicae)	19
Suriname (Nationale Top 40)	1
Sweden (Sverigetopplistan)	2
Switzerland (Schweizer Hitparade)	1
Taiwan (Billboard)	4
Thailand (IFPI)	4
Turkey (Billboard)	24
Turkey International Airplay (Radiomonitor Türkiye)	6
Ukraine Airplay (TopHit)	22
United Arab Emirates (IFPI)	1
UK Singles (Official Charts)	2
Uruguay Airplay (Monitor Latino)	7
US Billboard Hot 100	1
US Adult Contemporary (Billboard)	2
US Adult Pop Airplay (Billboard)	1
US Dance Airplay (Billboard)	16
US Pop Airplay (Billboard)	1
US Rhythmic Airplay (Billboard)	32
Venezuela Airplay (Record Report)	26
Vietnam (IFPI)	5
Vietnam (Vietnam Hot 100)	17

=== Monthly charts ===
List of chart positions
Chart (2024–2026)	Position
Belarus Airplay (TopHit)	99
Brazil Streaming (Pro-Música Brasil)	4
CIS Airplay (TopHit)	14
Czech Republic (Rádio Top 100)	2
Czech Republic (Singles Digitál Top 100)	4
Estonia Airplay (TopHit)	1
Kazakhstan Airplay (TopHit)	37
Latvia Airplay (TopHit)	94
Lithuania Airplay (TopHit)	2
Moldova Airplay (TopHit)	19
Panama Streaming (PRODUCE)	76
Paraguay Airplay (SGP)	4
Romania Airplay (TopHit)	4
Russia Airplay (TopHit)	48
Slovakia (Rádio Top 100)	6
Slovakia (Singles Digitál Top 100)	3
South Korea (Circle)	17
Ukraine Airplay (TopHit)	43

=== Year-end charts ===
List of chart positions
Chart (2024)	Position
Australia (ARIA)	31
Austria (Ö3 Austria Top 40)	40
Belgium (Ultratop 50 Flanders)	40
Belgium (Ultratop 50 Wallonia)	53
Brazil Streaming (Pro-Música Brasil)	50
Canada (Canadian Hot 100)	57
Chile Airplay (Monitor Latino)	6
CIS Airplay (TopHit)	64
Denmark (Tracklisten)	47
Estonia Airplay (TopHit)	38
France (SNEP)	66
Germany (GfK)	71
Global 200 (Billboard)	74
Global Singles (IFPI)	14
Hungary (Rádiós Top 40)	40
Iceland (Tónlistinn)	13
India International (IMI)	12
Lithuania Airplay (TopHit)	41
Netherlands (Dutch Top 40)	9
Netherlands (Single Top 100)	24
New Zealand (Recorded Music NZ)	22
Philippines (Philippines Hot 100)	12
Poland (Polish Airplay Top 100)	27
Poland (Polish Streaming Top 100)	66
Portugal (AFP)	13
Romania Airplay (TopHit)	97
Sweden (Sverigetopplistan)	74
Switzerland (Schweizer Hitparade)	34
UK Singles (Official Charts)	37
US Billboard Hot 100	62
US Adult Contemporary (Billboard)	25
US Adult Top 40 (Billboard)	48
Venezuela Rock Airplay (Record Report)	7

List of chart positions
Chart (2025)	Position
Argentina Airplay (Monitor Latino)	19
Australia (ARIA)	5
Austria (Ö3 Austria Top 40)	8
Belgium (Ultratop 50 Flanders)	7
Belgium (Ultratop 50 Wallonia)	18
Bolivia Airplay (Monitor Latino)	17
Brazil Streaming (Pro-Música Brasil)	14
Bulgaria Airplay (PROPHON)	8
Canada (Canadian Hot 100)	4
Canada AC (Billboard)	3
Canada CHR/Top 40 (Billboard)	8
Canada Hot AC (Billboard)	1
Central America Airplay (Monitor Latino)	50
Chile Airplay (Monitor Latino)	16
Colombia Anglo Airplay (Monitor Latino)	1
CIS Airplay (TopHit)	20
Costa Rica Airplay (Monitor Latino)	16
Czech Republic Singles Digital (ČNS IFPI)	8
Denmark (Tracklisten)	21
Dominican Republic Anglo Airplay (Monitor Latino)	2
Ecuador Airplay (Monitor Latino)	81
Estonia Airplay (TopHit)	34
El Salvador Anglo Airplay (Monitor Latino)	81
France (SNEP)	23
Germany (GfK)	11
Global 200 (Billboard)	2
Global Singles (IFPI)	4
Guatemala Anglo Airplay (Monitor Latino)	3
Honduras Anglo Airplay (Monitor Latino)	69
Hungary (Rádiós Top 40)	19
Hungary (Single Top 40)	36
Iceland (Tónlistinn)	24
India International (IMI)	1
Israel (Mako Hitlist)	11
Italy (FIMI)	50
Kazakhstan Airplay (TopHit)	122
Lithuania Airplay (TopHit)	7
Mexico Airplay (Monitor Latino)	16
Moldova Airplay (TopHit)	59
Netherlands (Dutch Top 40)	29
Netherlands (Single Top 100)	6
New Zealand (Recorded Music NZ)	3
Nicaragua Anglo Airplay (Monitor Latino)	12
Panama Airplay (Monitor Latino)	33
Paraguay Airplay (Monitor Latino)	30
Peru Airplay (Monitor Latino)	5
Philippines (Philippines Hot 100)	6
Poland (Polish Streaming Top 100)	14
Puerto Rico Anglo Airplay (Monitor Latino)	17
Romania Airplay (TopHit)	1
South Korea (Circle)	19
Sweden (Sverigetopplistan)	7
Switzerland (Schweizer Hitparade)	3
UK Singles (Official Charts)	10
Uruguay Airplay (Monitor Latino)	37
US Billboard Hot 100	1
US Adult Contemporary (Billboard)	3
US Adult Pop Airplay (Billboard)	1
US Pop Airplay (Billboard)	1
Venezuela Anglo Airplay (Monitor Latino)	9

== Certifications ==
List of certifications
Region	Certification	Certified units/sales
Australia (ARIA)	8× Platinum	560,000^{‡}
Austria (IFPI Austria)	2× Platinum	60,000^{‡}
Belgium (BRMA)	2× Platinum	80,000^{‡}
Brazil (Pro-Música Brasil)	11× Diamond	1,760,000^{‡}
Canada (Music Canada)	8× Platinum	640,000^{‡}
Denmark (IFPI Danmark)	2× Platinum	180,000^{‡}
France (SNEP)	Diamond	333,333^{‡}
Germany (BVMI)	Platinum	600,000^{‡}
Italy (FIMI)	Platinum	100,000^{‡}
New Zealand (RMNZ)	6× Platinum	180,000^{‡}
Nigeria (TCSN)	Silver	25,000^{‡}
Norway (IFPI Norway)	Platinum	60,000^{‡}
Poland (ZPAV)	Diamond	500,000^{‡}
Portugal (AFP)	6× Platinum	60,000^{‡}
Spain (Promusicae)	3× Platinum	300,000^{‡}
Switzerland (IFPI Switzerland)	Platinum	30,000^{‡}
United Kingdom (BPI)	3× Platinum	1,800,000^{‡}
Streaming
Central America (CFC)	3× Platinum	21,000,000^{†}
Czech Republic (ČNS IFPI)	Platinum	5,000,000^{†}
Greece (IFPI Greece)	Diamond	10,000,000^{†}
Japan (RIAJ)	Gold	50,000,000^{†}
Slovakia (ČNS IFPI)	Platinum	1,700,000^{†}
Sweden (GLF)	2× Platinum	24,000,000^{†}
^{‡} Sales+streaming figures based on certification alone.^{†} Streaming-only figures based on certification alone.

== Release history ==
List of release history, showing region(s), date(s), format(s), version(s) and label(s)
Region	Date	Format(s)	Version(s)	Label(s)	Ref.
Various	August 16, 2024	Digital download; streaming	Original	Interscope	
Italy	August 16, 2024	Radio airplay	Original	EMI; Warner	
Germany	August 16, 2024	CD	Original	Interscope; Streamline	
United Kingdom	August 16, 2024	CD	Original	Interscope; Streamline	
United States	August 16, 2024	CD	Original	Interscope; Streamline	
United States	August 19, 2024	Adult contemporary radio; hot adult contemporary radio	Original	Interscope	
United States	August 20, 2024	Contemporary hit radio	Original	Interscope	
Canada	August 23, 2024	CD	Original	Interscope; Streamline	
France	August 27, 2024	CD	Original	Interscope; Streamline	
United States	October 25, 2024	7-inch vinyl	Original; instrumental	Interscope; Streamline	
Various	October 29, 2024	Digital download; streaming	Instrumental	Interscope	
Various	October 30, 2024	Digital download; streaming	Live in Las Vegas	Interscope	
Various	November 1, 2024	Digital download; streaming	Acoustic	Interscope	
United States	November 20, 2024	Digital download	Sped Up	Interscope	
United States	November 20, 2024	Digital download	Instrumental Acoustic	Interscope	
Canada	November 29, 2024	7-inch vinyl	Original; instrumental	Interscope; Streamline	
Germany	December 9, 2024	7-inch vinyl	Original; instrumental	Interscope; Streamline	
France	December 13, 2024	7-inch vinyl	Original; instrumental	Interscope; Streamline	
United Kingdom	December 13, 2024	7-inch vinyl	Original; instrumental	Interscope; Streamline	
Various	February 8, 2026	Streaming	Live at the Super Bowl LX halftime show	NFL	
Various	May 14, 2026	Streaming	Live at Apple Music Live: Mayhem Requiem	Interscope	

== See also ==
- List of best-selling singles in Brazil
