= 2025 iHeartRadio Music Awards =

American music awards

- Date: March 17, 2025
- Location: Dolby Theatre, Los Angeles
- Country: United States
- Hosted by: LL Cool J
- Most awards: Taylor Swift (9)
- Most nominations: Taylor Swift and Morgan Wallen (10 each)
- Website: www.iheart.com/music-awards

Television/radio coverage
- Network: Fox

The 2025 iHeartRadio Music Awards were held at the Dolby Theatre in Los Angeles on March 17, 2025, and broadcast live on Fox. It was hosted by LL Cool J.

At the ceremony, Mariah Carey was honored with the Icon Award for her "incredible and influential career as singer, songwriter, and producer, who has broken virtually every chart and touring record around the globe". Lady Gaga was honored with the Innovator Award for being a "modern day artist innovator", who has taken "beyond creating music and performances that have inspired the world, and an outspoken activist, philanthropist and supporter of many important issues". Taylor Swift's The Eras Tour was honored with Tour of the Century. Nelly was honored with Landmark Award which honors artists whose album releases have inspired and shaped culture over multiple decades.

== Performers ==
Performers were announced on March 10, 2025.

Performers at the 2025 iHeartRadio Music Awards
Performer(s)	Song(s)
Billie Eilish Finneas	"Wildflower"
Nelly	Medley: "Country Grammar (Hot Shit)" "Ride wit Me" (with City Spud) "E.I." "Hot in Herre"
Gracie Abrams	"That's So True"
Muni Long Tori Kelly	Tribute to Mariah Carey: "We Belong Together" (Long) "Always Be My Baby" (Kelly)
GloRilla	"Never Find" (with K Carbon) "Whatchu Kno About Me" (with Sexyy Red)
Kenny Chesney	"Get Along"
Taylor Swift	"Mirrorball"^{[a]}
Bad Bunny	"EoO"

Notes

- ^{^[a]} Pre-recorded from the opening night of The Eras Tour at State Farm Stadium in Glendale, Arizona

== Winners and nominees ==
iHeartRadio announced the nominees on January 22, 2025. Taylor Swift and Morgan Wallen were the most nominated artists with ten, followed by Kendrick Lamar, Post Malone, and Sabrina Carpenter with nine. Swift won nine awards overall, making her the most awarded artist of the ceremony.

Winners are listed first and in bold.

=== Main categories ===
Song of the Year	Artist of the Year
**"Beautiful Things" – Benson Boone**; "A Bar Song (Tipsy)" – Shaboozey; "Agora Hills" – Doja Cat; "Espresso" – Sabrina Carpenter; "Greedy" – Tate McRae; "I Had Some Help" – Post Malone featuring Morgan Wallen; "Lose Control" – Teddy Swims; "Lovin on Me" – Jack Harlow; "Not Like Us" – Kendrick Lamar; "Too Sweet" – Hozier	**Taylor Swift**; Billie Eilish; Doja Cat; Jelly Roll; Kendrick Lamar; Morgan Wallen; Post Malone; Sabrina Carpenter; SZA; Teddy Swims
Best Collaboration	Pop Artist of the Year
**"Die with a Smile" – Lady Gaga and Bruno Mars**; "Fortnight" – Taylor Swift featuring Post Malone; "I Had Some Help" – Post Malone featuring Morgan Wallen; "Like That" – Future, Metro Boomin and Kendrick Lamar; "Miles on It" – Kane Brown and Marshmello	**Sabrina Carpenter**; Billie Eilish; Chappell Roan; Tate McRae; Taylor Swift
Best New Pop Artist	Pop Song of the Year
**Teddy Swims**; Benson Boone; Chappell Roan; Gracie Abrams; Shaboozey	**"Espresso" – Sabrina Carpenter**; "Agora Hills" – Doja Cat; "Beautiful Things" – Benson Boone; "Greedy" – Tate McRae; "Too Sweet" – Hozier
Country Song of the Year	Country Artist of the Year
**"I Had Some Help" – Post Malone featuring Morgan Wallen**; "A Bar Song (Tipsy)" – Shaboozey; "Cowgirls" – Morgan Wallen featuring Ernest; "I Am Not Okay" – Jelly Roll; "World on Fire" – Nate Smith	**Jelly Roll**; Kane Brown; Lainey Wilson; Luke Combs; Morgan Wallen
Best New Country Artist	World Artist of the Year
**Shaboozey**; Ashley Cooke; Dasha; George Birge; Tucker Wetmore	**Tyla**; Burna Boy; Central Cee; Tems; YG Marley
Hip-Hop Song of the Year	Hip-Hop Artist of the Year
**"Not Like Us" – Kendrick Lamar**; "Like That" – Future, Metro Boomin and Kendrick Lamar; "Lovin on Me" – Jack Harlow; "Rich Baby Daddy" – Drake featuring Sexyy Red and SZA; "TGIF" – GloRilla	**GloRilla**; Drake; Future; Kendrick Lamar; Travis Scott
Best New Hip-Hop Artist	R&B Song of the Year
**BossMan Dlow**; 310babii; BigXthaPlug; Cash Cobain; Jordan Adetunji	**"Made for Me" – Muni Long**; "ICU" – Coco Jones; "Sensational" – Chris Brown featuring Davido and Lojay; "Water" – Tyla; "WY@" – Brent Faiyaz
R&B Artist of the Year	Best New R&B Artist
**SZA**; Chris Brown; Muni Long; Usher; Victoria Monét	**4Batz**; Ambré; Inayah; Josh X; Maeta
Alternative Song of the Year	Alternative Artist of the Year
**"Too Sweet" – Hozier**; "Dilemma" – Green Day; "Landmines" – Sum 41; "Neon Pill" – Cage the Elephant; "The Emptiness Machine" – Linkin Park	**Green Day**; Cage the Elephant; Linkin Park; Sum 41; Twenty One Pilots
Best New Alternative/Rock Artist	Rock Song of the Year
**Fontaines D.C.**; Djo; Good Neighbours; Myles Smith; The Last Dinner Party	**"A Symptom of Being Human" – Shinedown**; "All My Life" – Falling in Reverse and Jelly Roll; "Dark Matter" – Pearl Jam; "Screaming Suicide" – Metallica; "The Emptiness Machine" – Linkin Park
Rock Artist of the Year	Dance Song of the Year
**Shinedown**; Linkin Park; Green Day; Metallica; Pearl Jam	**"360" – Charli XCX**; "Chase It (Mmm Da Da Da)" – Bebe Rexha; "I Don't Wanna Wait" – David Guetta and OneRepublic; "Make You Mine" – Madison Beer; "Water" – Tyla and Marshmello
Dance Artist of the Year	Latin Pop/Urban Song of the Year
**David Guetta**; Calvin Harris; Dua Lipa; Kylie Minogue; Tiësto	**"Perro Negro" – Bad Bunny featuring Feid**; "Brickell" – Feid and Yandel; "La Falda" – Myke Towers; "Qlona" – Karol G featuring Peso Pluma; "Si Antes Te Hubiera Conocido" – Karol G
Latin Pop/Urban Artist of the Year	Best New Latin/Urban Artist
**Feid**; Bad Bunny; Karol G; Myke Towers; Shakira	**Kapo**; Christian Alicea; Cris MJ; Ela Taubert; FloyyMenor
Regional Mexican Song of the Year	Regional Mexican Artist of the Year
**"Alch Si" – Grupo Frontera and Carin León**; "El Beneficio De La Duda" – Grupo Firme; "First Love" – Oscar Ortiz and Edgardo Nuñez; "La Diabla" – Xavi; "Tu Perfume" – Banda MS de Sergio Lizárraga	**Peso Pluma**; Grupo Frontera; Intocable; Los Ángeles Azules; Xavi
Best New Regional Mexican Artist	K-Pop Artist of the Year
**Xavi**; Chino Pacas; Iván Cornejo; Luis R. Conriquez; Tito Double P	**Ateez**; Aespa; Enhypen; Jimin; Lisa
K-Pop Song of the Year	Best New K-Pop Artist
**"Who" – Jimin**; "Chk Chk Boom" – Stray Kids; "Magnetic" – Illit; "Supernova" – Aespa; "XO (Only If You Say Yes)" – Enhypen	**Illit**; Babymonster; Badvillain; NCT Wish; TWS
Songwriter of the Year	Producer of the Year
**Amy Allen**; Josh Coleman; Ernest; Ashley Gorley; Justin Tranter	**Julian Bunetta**; Jack Antonoff; Evan Blair; Mustard; Dan Nigro
Breakthrough Artist of the Year	Album of the Year
**Gracie Abrams**	**Hit Me Hard and Soft – Billie Eilish**
Album of the Year (per genre)
Alternative: **Clancy – Twenty One Pilots**; Country: **F-1 Trillion – Post Malone**; Dance: **Brat – Charli XCX**; Hip-Hop: **We Don't Trust You – Future and Metro Boomin**; K-Pop: **Ate – Stray Kids**; Latin Pop/Urban: **Las Mujeres Ya No Lloran – Shakira**; Pop: **The Tortured Poets Department – Taylor Swift**; R&B: **Coming Home – Usher**; Regional Mexican: **Éxodo – Peso Pluma**; Rock: **From Zero – Linkin Park**

=== Socially voted categories ===
Voting for Socially voted categories opened on January 22 and ended on March 10 on iHeartRadio's website.

Best Lyrics	Favorite On Screen
**"Fortnight" – Taylor Swift featuring Post Malone**; "Beautiful Things" – Benson Boone; "Birds of a Feather" – Billie Eilish; "Espresso" – Sabrina Carpenter; "Exes" – Tate McRae; "Good Luck, Babe!" – Chappell Roan; "I Had Some Help" – Post Malone featuring Morgan Wallen; "I Love You, I'm Sorry" – Gracie Abrams; "Not Like Us" – Kendrick Lamar; "Saturn" – SZA; "We Can't Be Friends (Wait for Your Love)" – Ariana Grande; "Who" – Jimin	**Taylor Swift: The Eras Tour (Taylor's Version) – Taylor Swift**; Are You Sure?! – Jimin and Jungkook; Child Star – Demi Lovato; Elton John: Never Too Late – Elton John; Gaga Chromatica Ball – Lady Gaga; I Am: Celine Dion – Celine Dion; Lainey Wilson: Bell Bottom Country –Lainey Wilson; Megan Thee Stallion: In Her Words – Megan Thee Stallion; Olivia Rodrigo: Guts World Tour – Olivia Rodrigo; Pop Star Academy: Katseye – Katseye; Road Diary: Bruce Springsteen and the E Street Band – Bruce Springsteen; Thank You, Goodnight: The Bon Jovi Story – Bon Jovi
Best Music Video	Favorite Tour Photographer
**"Fortnight" – Taylor Swift featuring Post Malone**; "APT." – Rosé and Bruno Mars; "Beautiful Things" – Benson Boone; "Die with a Smile" – Lady Gaga and Bruno Mars; "Espresso" – Sabrina Carpenter; "Houdini" – Dua Lipa; "Houdini" – Eminem; "I Had Some Help" – Post Malone featuring Morgan Wallen; "Luna" – Feid and ATL Jacob; "Not Like Us" – Kendrick Lamar; "Please Please Please" – Sabrina Carpenter; "Rockstar" – Lisa	**Alfredo Flores – Sabrina Carpenter**; Adam Degross – Post Malone; Baeth – Tate McRae; Christian Tierney – Niall Horan; David Bergman – Luke Combs; Henry Hwu – Billie Eilish; Lucienne Nghiem – Chappell Roan; Miles Leavitt – Olivia Rodrigo; Pooneh Ghana – Noah Kahan; Rayscorruptedmind – Travis Scott; Sanjay Parikh – Shinedown; Yasi – Kacey Musgraves
Favorite Tour Style	Favorite Tour Tradition
**Taylor Swift – The Eras Tour**; Billie Eilish – Hit Me Hard and Soft: The Tour; Chappell Roan – The Midwest Princess Tour; Charli XCX and Troye Sivan – Sweat; GloRilla and Megan Thee Stallion – Hot Girl Summer Tour; Nicki Minaj – Pink Friday 2 World Tour; Olivia Rodrigo – Guts World Tour; Sabrina Carpenter – Short n' Sweet Tour; Tate McRae – Think Later World Tour; Usher – Usher: Past Present Future	**Taylor Swift – Surprise songs**; Benson Boone – Backflips; Chappell Roan – Teaching "Hot to Go!" dance; Charli XCX and Troye Sivan – "Apple" Girl dance; Morgan Wallen – Walk out song; Niall Horan – "Heaven" pose; Olivia Rodrigo – Encore tank; Sabrina Carpenter – "Juno" position; Tate McRae – Soundcheck covers; Taylor Swift – "22" hat; Nicki Minaj - Fans Sing; Usher – Feeding cherries
Favorite Surprise Guest	Favorite K-Pop Dance Challenge
**Taylor Swift – Travis Kelce**; Charli XCX – Lorde; Coldplay – Selena Gomez; Future and Metro Boomin – Travis Scott; GloRilla and Megan Thee Stallion – Cardi B; Jennifer Hudson – Cher; Kendrick Lamar – Ken and Friends; Luke Combs – Twisters cast; Morgan Wallen – Travis Kelce and Patrick Mahomes; Niall Horan – Shawn Mendes; Olivia Rodrigo – Chappell Roan; Peso Pluma – Becky G	**"Ggum" – Yeonjun**; "Maestro" – Seventeen; "Magnetic" – Illit; "Smart" – Le Sserafim; "Sticky" – Kiss of Life; "Supernova" – Aespa; "Touch" – Katseye; "Up" – Aespa (Note: Credited under Aespa but is a solo track performed by Karina.); "Work" – Ateez; "XO (Only If You Say Yes)" – Enhypen
Favorite Broadway Debut	Favorite Soundtrack
**Rachel Zegler – Romeo and Juliet**; Adam Lambert – Cabaret at the Kit Kat Club; Ariana Madix – Chicago; Barbie Ferreira – Cult of Love; Charli D'Amelio – & Juliet; Grant Gustin – Water for Elephants; Kit Connor – Romeo and Juliet; Lola Tung – Hadestown; Nicole Scherzinger – Sunset Boulevard; Robert Downey Jr. – McNeal; Sebastián Yatra – Chicago; Shailene Woodley – Cult of Love	**Wicked**; Back to Black; Bad Boys: Ride or Die; Bob Marley: One Love; Challengers; Deadpool & Wolverine; Descendants: The Rise of Red; Emilia Pérez; The Book of Clarence; Twisters

=== Special awards ===
iHeartRadio Innovator	iHeartRadio Icon Award
**Lady Gaga**	**Mariah Carey**
iHeartRadio Landmark Award	Tour of the Century
**Nelly**	**The Eras Tour – Taylor Swift**
