= Arden Jones =

American rapper (born 2001)

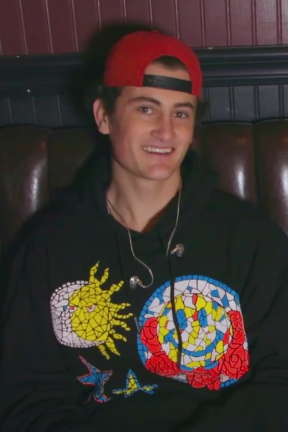
- Jones in 2023

Background information
- Born: February 26, 2001 (age 25); Novato, California, U.S.
- Genres: Hip-hop
- Occupation: SingerSongwriter
- Years active: 2021–present
- Label: Independent
- Website: ardenjonesmusic.com

Arden Jones (born February 26, 2001) is an American rapper from the San Francisco Bay Area. Jones studied film in high school at the Marin School of the Arts and went to college at the Dodge College of Film and Media Arts.

== Early life ==
Jones was bought up in a musical household, his father having played in a rock band and his mother being a journalist and poet, and was exposed to rock, jazz and blues from a young age.

Jones taught himself how to play the piano, guitar, mandolin, ukulele, and stand-up bass.

== Career ==
Jones began releasing music to SoundCloud in 2021 and had gained attention after his debut single, "Parallel Parking", went viral on TikTok and Spotify and had charted on Spotify's Viral 50 in Australia and New Zealand. The single later led him to find his manager on Instagram.

Soon after the popularity of his single, Jones dropped out of college and moved to Los Angeles to focus on his music career.

Atlantic Records signed with Jones in January after they found him on TikTok and had his demo finished in two weeks.

Jones followed up "Parallel Parking" with "Roll the Dice" and "Rollercoaster".

In February 2022, Jones released his first EP, "age tape 1", and went on to say that he would be releasing an EP on the first Thursday of every month and went on to release, "age tape 2" to "age tape 9" over March to October.

On January 20, 2023, Jones was featured on American rapper Bankrol Hayden's single, "Can't Change For You", alongside American rapper charlieonnafriday. On March 22, 2023, Jones was featured on American singer-songwriter Felly's single, "Crying In Sunshine".

In 2024, Jones was featured on rapper B-Lovee's single "Exhausted".

In 2025, Jones continued releasing music, including the single "someone new". In January 2026, Jones released "think you're someone new", a collaboration with producer Ian Asher. The song became one of Jones's most successful releases, receiving tens of millions of streams on Spotify.

In 2026, Jones expanded his touring schedule, performing as a supporting act for The Chainsmokers and later joining Passion Pit on their Pretty Penny Tour. The tour included performances at venues across the United States, with Jones billed alongside Passion Pit at the Riviera Theatre in Chicago, the 9:30 Club in Washington, D.C., and other venues."Passion Pit - The Pretty Penny Tour". Jam Productions."Passion Pit - The Pretty Penny Tour". Live Nation.

On June 29, 2026, Jones performed as a supporting act for AJR at Red Rocks Amphitheatre in Morrison, Colorado."AJR". Red Rocks Amphitheatre."AJR". Denver Arts & Venues.

On August 27, 2026, Arden released his first album, FLASH.
