= Bankrol Hayden =

American rapper and singer (born 2001)

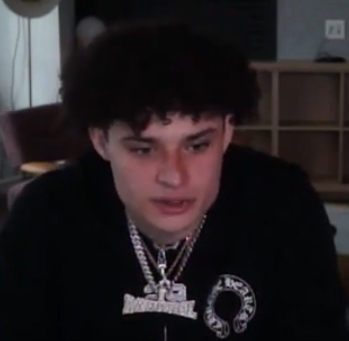
- Bankrol Hayden in 2023

Background information
- Born: Hayden Inacio; September 30, 2001 (age 25); Modesto, California, US
- Genres: Hip hop; trap
- Occupations: Rapper; singer; songwriter
- Years active: 2017–present
- Label: Atlantic

Hayden Inacio (born September 30, 2001), known professionally as Bankrol Hayden, is an American rapper and singer from Modesto, California. Signed to Atlantic Records, he is known for his gold-certified singles "Brothers" featuring Luh Kel and "Costa Rica" with The Kid Laroi, and his album Pain is Temporary, with the latter peaking at number 197 on the Billboard 200.

== Early life and inspiration ==
Bankrol Hayden was born as Hayden Inacio in Modesto, California. He began rapping when he was in eighth grade. Hayden cited Kid Cudi as his biggest musical inspiration since childhood.

== Career ==
In 2017, Hayden released his debut single "Humble" via streaming services and later gained traction with the release of his song "Ride With You". In May 2018, Hayden released his single "29", after being in a serious car accident on November 29, 2017, that spent him six days on life support. In 2019, he released the single "B.A.N.K.R.O.L.". Also in 2019, the single "Brothers" featuring singer and rapper Luh Kel was released. In March 2020, Hayden released the single "Costa Rica", which garnered over 50 million streams and included a remix featuring Australian rapper and singer the Kid Laroi. On June 20, 2020, Hayden released his debut album Pain is Temporary with appearances from Lil Baby, Polo G, and the Kid Laroi. The album peaked at number 197 on the Billboard 200. In March 2021, Hayden was featured on crooner LB Spiffy's single "Again". In September 2021, Hayden released the single "Come Through" featuring rapper Lil Tecca. On March 10, 2023, Hayden released his second album 29 with appearances from Blueface, Lil Tecca, Arden Jones, and Charlieonnafriday. On September 26, 2025, Hayden would release his third studio album, Middle Of Somewhere, with appearances from Charlieonnafriday, honestav, Einer Bankz, and Nick Nayersina. Following the release, Hayden announced that he will be doing a tour for the album, which begins on December 5, and ends on December 21, just four days before Christmas.

== Discography ==
=== Studio albums ===
List of studio albums, with selected chart positions and certifications
Title	Album details	Peak chart positions
Title	Album details	US
Pain Is Temporary	Released: June 20, 2020; Label: Atlantic; Formats: Digital download, streaming	197
29	Released: March 10, 2023; Label: Atlantic; Formats: Digital download, streaming	—
Middle Of Somewhere	Released: September 26, 2025; Label: Self-released; Formats: Digital download, streaming	—
"—" denotes a recording that did not chart or was not released in that territory.

=== Singles ===
==== As lead artist ====
Title	Year	Certifications	Album
"Humble"	2017		Non-album singles
"Ride With You"	2017		Non-album singles
"29"	2018		Non-album singles
"B.A.N.K.R.O.L."	2019		Non-album singles
"Brothers" (featuring Luh Kel)	2019	RIAA: Gold	Pain Is Temporary
"Costa Rica" (featuring The Kid Laroi)	2020	RIAA: Platinum; BPI: Silver	Pain Is Temporary
"Come Through" (featuring Lil Tecca)	2021		29
"No Drama"	2021		29
"Fuck Love"	2022		29
"Van Hayden"	2022		29
"Courtside"	2022		Non-album single
"Deep End" (featuring Lil Skies)	2022		29
"Can't Change For You" (featuring Charlieonnafriday and Arden Jones)	2023		29
"Bop Slide" (featuring Blueface, OhGeesy and Maxo Kream)	2023		29

==== As featured artist ====
Title	Year	Album
"Again" (LB Spiffy featuring Bankrol Hayden)	2021	Non-album singles
"TOUCHDOWN" (YSB Tril featuring Bankrol Hayden)	2021	HOTSHOT
"BENZ" (Young Cardi featuring Bankrol Hayden)	2023	Non-album singles
