= Think Later World Tour =

2024 concert tour by Tate McRae

- Tour by Tate McRae
- Promotional poster for the tour
- Location: Asia; Europe; North America; Oceania
- Associated album: Think Later
- Start date: April 17, 2024
- End date: November 21, 2024
- No. of shows: 65
- Supporting acts: charlieonnafriday; Presley Regier; Achiraya Nitibhon

Tate McRae concert chronology
- Are We Flying Tour (2022–2023); Think Later World Tour (2024); Miss Possessive Tour (2025)

The Think Later World Tour was the fourth concert tour by Canadian singer-songwriter Tate McRae in support of her sophomore studio album, Think Later (2023). It began on April 17, 2024, in Dublin, and concluded on November 21, 2024, in Wellington, with shows across Asia, Europe, North America and Oceania. charlieonnafriday and Presley Regier served as opening acts.

== Background ==
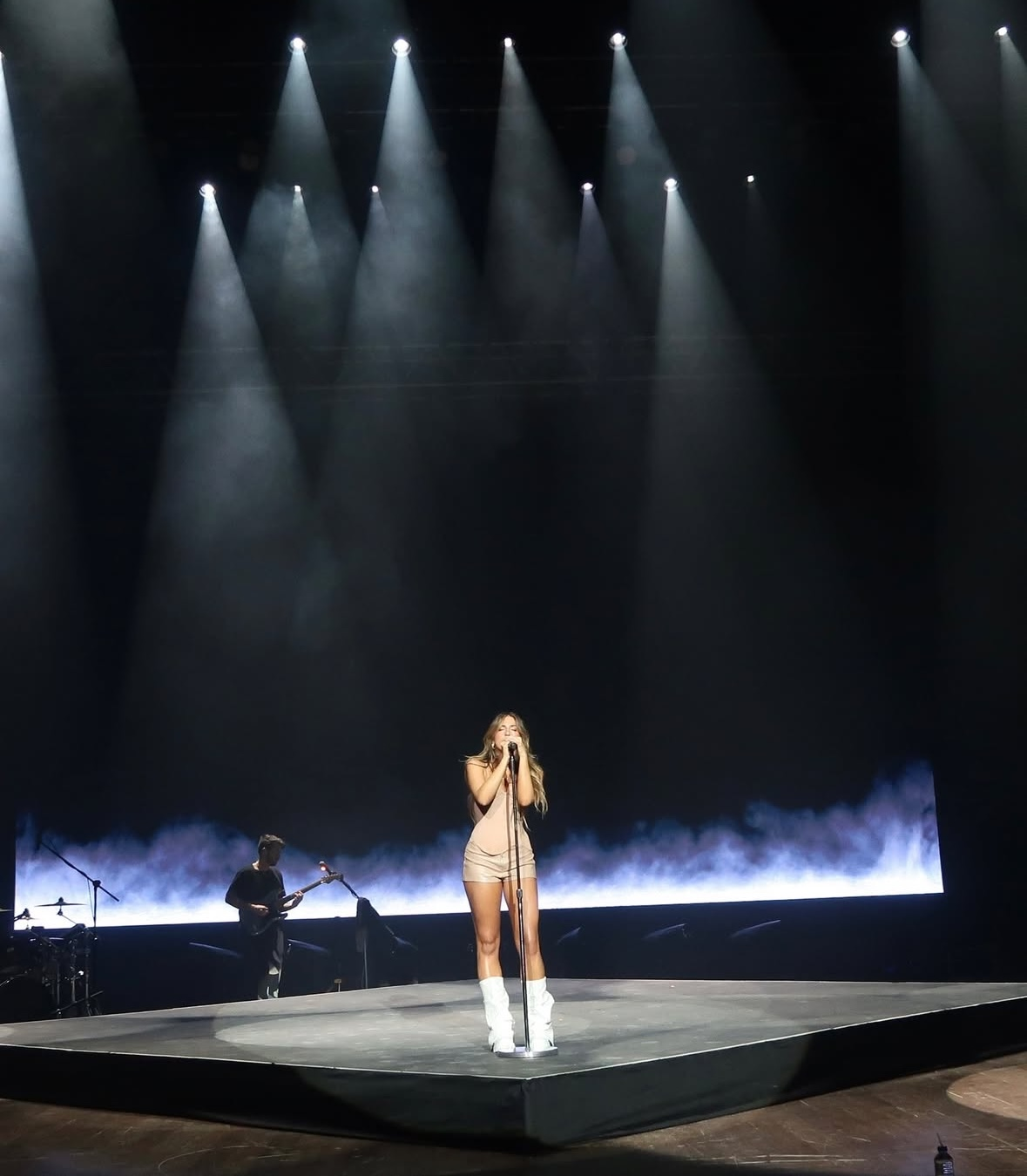
McRae performing in Quezon City on November 4, 2024.

On November 6, 2023, McRae announced a 53-date European, North American, and Oceanian tour, titled the Think Later World Tour. The Think Later World Tour is McRae's fourth concert tour, and follows her third tour, Are We Flying Tour, which she embarked on in 2023, in support of her debut studio album I Used to Think I Could Fly. Alongside the announcement of the tour, it has been revealed that there would have been an artist presale going on sale on November 9, 2023 with the general sale going on sale on November 10, 2023. On November 7, 2023, McRae announced an additional Boston date due to demand. On November 9, 2023, McRae announced an additional London date due to demand. On November 13, 2023, McRae announced additional Moore Park and Melbourne dates due to demand, as well as a venue upgrade for the Adelaide show. On December 14, 2023, it was announced that McRae would headline her hometown Cowboys Music Festival in Calgary. On April 19, 2024, McRae added four Asia dates to her world tour.

== Setlist ==
This set list is representative of the first show in Dublin, Ireland. It does not represent all dates throughout the tour.

1. "Think Later"
2. "Hurt My Feelings"
3. "Uh Oh"
4. "What's Your Problem?"
5. "Feel Like Shit"
6. "Calgary"
7. "Stay Done"
8. "Messier"
9. "Cut My Hair"
10. "Rubberband"
11. "Exes"
12. "Grave"
13. "Guilty Conscience"
14. "We're Not Alike"
15. "She's All I Wanna Be"
16. "You Broke Me First"
17. "Run for the Hills"

Encore

1. "10:35"
2. "Greedy"

=== Alterations ===
- Starting with the show in Calgary, "10:35" was added to the set list. "Messier" and "Grave" were not performed for this show.
- During the show in Nashville, McRae performed "Tennessee Orange" with Megan Moroney.
- During the show in New York City, McRae performed "It's OK I'm OK" and "Without You" with the Kid Laroi.

== Shows ==
List of concerts, showing date, city, country, venue and opening acts
Dates (2024)	City	Country	Venue	Opening act(s)	Attendance	Revenue
April 17	Dublin	Ireland	3Olympia Theatre	charlieonnafriday	—N/a	—N/a
April 18	Dublin	Ireland	3Olympia Theatre	charlieonnafriday	—N/a	—N/a
April 20	Glasgow	Scotland	O2 Academy Glasgow	charlieonnafriday	—N/a	—N/a
April 22	London	England	Eventim Apollo	charlieonnafriday	—N/a	—N/a
April 23	London	England	Eventim Apollo	charlieonnafriday	—N/a	—N/a
April 24	Manchester	England	O2 Apollo Manchester	charlieonnafriday	—N/a	—N/a
April 26	Wolverhampton	England	Wolverhampton Civic Hall	charlieonnafriday	—N/a	—N/a
April 28	Cologne	Germany	Palladium	charlieonnafriday	—N/a	—N/a
April 29	Amsterdam	Netherlands	AFAS Live	charlieonnafriday	—N/a	—N/a
April 30	Antwerp	Belgium	Lotto Arena	charlieonnafriday	—N/a	—N/a
May 2	Stockholm	Sweden	Annexet	charlieonnafriday	—N/a	—N/a
May 3	Oslo	Norway	Oslo Spektrum	charlieonnafriday	—N/a	—N/a
May 4	Frederiksberg	Denmark	Falkonersalen	charlieonnafriday	—N/a	—N/a
May 6	Hamburg	Germany	Alsterdorfer Sporthalle	charlieonnafriday	—N/a	—N/a
May 7	Berlin	Germany	Uber Eats Music Hall	charlieonnafriday	—N/a	—N/a
May 8	Prague	Czech Republic	Forum Karlín	charlieonnafriday	—N/a	—N/a
May 10	Warsaw	Poland	Arena COS Torwar	charlieonnafriday	—N/a	—N/a
May 12	Zürich	Switzerland	Halle 622	charlieonnafriday	—N/a	—N/a
May 13	Vienna	Austria	Gasometer	charlieonnafriday	—N/a	—N/a
May 14	Munich	Germany	Zenith	charlieonnafriday	—N/a	—N/a
May 16	Milan	Italy	Fabrique	charlieonnafriday	—N/a	—N/a
May 17	Paris	France	Zénith Paris	charlieonnafriday	—N/a	—N/a
May 20	Barcelona	Spain	Sant Jordi Club	charlieonnafriday	—N/a	—N/a
May 21	Madrid	Spain	Palacio Vistalegre	charlieonnafriday	—N/a	—N/a
May 22	Lisbon	Portugal	Coliseu dos Recreios	charlieonnafriday	—N/a	—N/a
July 5 (Note: Part of Cowboys Music Festival)	Calgary	Canada	Stampede Park	—N/a	—N/a	—N/a
July 7	Woodinville	United States	Chateau Ste. Michelle	Presley Regier	4,500 / 4,500	$377,836
July 9	San Francisco	United States	Bill Graham Civic Auditorium	Presley Regier	8,512 / 8,512	$438,730
July 11	Los Angeles	United States	Greek Theatre	Presley Regier	5,930 / 5,930	$487,622
July 14	Phoenix	United States	Arizona Financial Theatre	Presley Regier	5,218 / 5,218	$360,832
July 17	Austin	United States	Moody Amphitheater	Presley Regier	4,716 / 4,716	$338,584
July 19	Houston	United States	713 Music Hall	Presley Regier	4,899 / 4,899	$284,653
July 20	Irving	United States	Toyota Music Factory	Presley Regier	7,745 / 7,745	$483,831
July 21	Rogers	United States	Walmart Arkansas Music Pavilion	Presley Regier	10,916 / 10,916	$477,016
July 24	Cincinnati	United States	Andrew J. Brady Music Center	Presley Regier	4,384 / 4,384	$266,346
July 27	Toronto	Canada	Budweiser Stage	Presley Regier	16,017 / 16,017	$746,581
July 28	Sterling Heights	United States	Michigan Lottery Amphitheatre	Presley Regier	8,301 / 8,301	$580,304
July 30	Maryland Heights	United States	St. Louis Music Park	Presley Regier	4,618 / 4,618	$333,624
August 1	Minneapolis	United States	Minneapolis Armory	Presley Regier	7,002 / 7,002	$398,685
August 3 (Note: Part of Lollapalooza)	Chicago	United States	Grant Park	—N/a	—N/a	—N/a
August 6	Nashville	United States	Ascend Amphitheater	Presley Regier	6,825 / 6,825	$391,510
August 7	Indianapolis	United States	Everwise Amphitheater	Presley Regier	6,134 / 6,134	$338,504
August 9	Boston	United States	MGM Music Hall at Fenway	Presley Regier	—N/a	—N/a
August 10	Boston	United States	MGM Music Hall at Fenway	Presley Regier	—N/a	—N/a
August 11	Uncasville	United States	Mohegan Sun Arena	Presley Regier	—N/a	—N/a
August 13	Washington, D.C.	United States	The Anthem	Presley Regier	—N/a	—N/a
August 14	Philadelphia	United States	Skyline Stage	Presley Regier	—N/a	—N/a
August 16	Raleigh	United States	Red Hat Amphitheater	Presley Regier	—N/a	—N/a
August 17	Atlanta	United States	Cadence Bank Amphitheatre	Presley Regier	—N/a	—N/a
August 19	Holmdel	United States	PNC Bank Arts Center	Presley Regier	—N/a	—N/a
August 22	New York City	United States	Madison Square Garden	Presley Regier	—N/a	—N/a
September 28 (Note: Part of Audacy's We Can Survive.)	Newark	United States	Prudential Center	—N/a	—N/a	—N/a
October 29	Tokyo	Japan	Toyosu PIT	—N/a	—N/a	—N/a
October 31	Singapore		The Star Performing Arts Centre	—N/a	—N/a	—N/a
November 2	Bangkok	Thailand	UOB Live	Achiraya Nitibhon	—N/a	—N/a
November 4	Quezon City	Philippines	New Frontier Theater	—N/a	—N/a	—N/a
November 8	Perth	Australia	Red Hill Auditorium	charlieonnafriday	—N/a	—N/a
November 10	Brisbane	Australia	Riverstage	charlieonnafriday	—N/a	—N/a
November 12	Sydney	Australia	Hordern Pavilion	charlieonnafriday	—N/a	—N/a
November 13	Sydney	Australia	Hordern Pavilion	charlieonnafriday	—N/a	—N/a
November 15 (Note: The venue for this show was upgraded from the AEC Theatre following high demand.)	Adelaide	Australia	Adelaide Entertainment Centre	charlieonnafriday	—N/a	—N/a
November 16	Melbourne	Australia	Margaret Court Arena	charlieonnafriday	—N/a	—N/a
November 17	Melbourne	Australia	Margaret Court Arena	charlieonnafriday	—N/a	—N/a
November 19	Auckland	New Zealand	Spark Arena	charlieonnafriday	—N/a	—N/a
November 21	Wellington	New Zealand	TSB Arena	charlieonnafriday	—N/a	—N/a
Total					105,717 / 105,717 (100%)	$6,304,658

== Notes ==
Show details
