= List of Billboard Pop Airplay number-one songs of 2024 =

This is a list of songs which reached number one on the Billboard Pop Airplay chart in 2024.

== Chart history ==
Key
†	Indicates best-performing song of 2024

Issue date	Song	Artist(s)	Ref.
January 6	"Greedy" †	Tate McRae	
January 13	"Greedy" †	Tate McRae	
January 20	"Greedy" †	Tate McRae	
January 27	"Greedy" †	Tate McRae	
February 3	"Greedy" †	Tate McRae	
February 10	"Lovin on Me"	Jack Harlow	
February 17	"Lovin on Me"	Jack Harlow	
February 24	"Lovin on Me"	Jack Harlow	
March 2	"Agora Hills"	Doja Cat	
March 9	"Lovin on Me"	Jack Harlow	
March 16	"Is It Over Now? (Taylor's Version)"	Taylor Swift	
March 23	"Lovin on Me"	Jack Harlow	
March 30	"Lovin on Me"	Jack Harlow	
April 6	"Feather"	Sabrina Carpenter	
April 13	"Lose Control"	Teddy Swims	
April 20	"Lose Control"	Teddy Swims	
April 27	"Beautiful Things"	Benson Boone	
May 4	"Beautiful Things"	Benson Boone	
May 11	"Beautiful Things"	Benson Boone	
May 18	"Beautiful Things"	Benson Boone	
May 25	"We Can't Be Friends (Wait for Your Love)"	Ariana Grande	
June 1	"We Can't Be Friends (Wait for Your Love)"	Ariana Grande	
June 8	"Saturn"	SZA	
June 15	"Saturn"	SZA	
June 22	"Too Sweet"	Hozier	
June 29	"Too Sweet"	Hozier	
July 6	"Too Sweet"	Hozier	
July 13	"Espresso"	Sabrina Carpenter	
July 20	"Espresso"	Sabrina Carpenter	
July 27	"Espresso"	Sabrina Carpenter	
August 3	"I Had Some Help"	Post Malone featuring Morgan Wallen	
August 10	"I Had Some Help"	Post Malone featuring Morgan Wallen	
August 17	"A Bar Song (Tipsy)"	Shaboozey	
August 24	"A Bar Song (Tipsy)"	Shaboozey	
August 31	"Million Dollar Baby"	Tommy Richman	
September 7	"Please Please Please"	Sabrina Carpenter	
September 14	"Please Please Please"	Sabrina Carpenter	
September 21	"Good Luck, Babe!"	Chappell Roan	
September 28	"Birds of a Feather"	Billie Eilish	
October 5	"Birds of a Feather"	Billie Eilish	
October 12	"Birds of a Feather"	Billie Eilish	
October 19	"Birds of a Feather"	Billie Eilish	
October 26	"Birds of a Feather"	Billie Eilish	
November 2	"Birds of a Feather"	Billie Eilish	
November 9	"Birds of a Feather"	Billie Eilish	
November 16	"Birds of a Feather"	Billie Eilish	
November 23	"Die with a Smile"	Lady Gaga and Bruno Mars	
November 30	"Die with a Smile"	Lady Gaga and Bruno Mars	
December 7	"Die with a Smile"	Lady Gaga and Bruno Mars	
December 14	"Stargazing"	Myles Smith	
December 21	"Taste"	Sabrina Carpenter	
December 28	"Taste"	Sabrina Carpenter	

== See also ==
- 2024 in American music
