= Think Later =

2023 studio album by Tate McRae

Studio album by Tate McRae
- Released: December 8, 2023
- Recorded: Late 2022 – November 1, 2023
- Genres: Trap-pop; dance-pop
- Length: 38:16
- Label: RCA
- Producers: Ryan Tedder; Grant Boutin; Jasper Harris; Thomas LaRosa; Tyler Spry; Ilya; Greg Kurstin

Tate McRae chronology
I Used to Think I Could Fly (2022)	Think Later (2023)	So Close to What (2025)

Singles from Think Later
- 1. "Greedy" Released: September 15, 2023; 2. "Exes" Released: November 17, 2023

Think Later is the second studio album by Canadian singer Tate McRae, released on December 8, 2023, through RCA Records. It was co-executive produced by Ryan Tedder and promoted by the release of two singles. The lead single "Greedy" was released on September 15, 2023, followed by "Exes" on November 17, 2023. "Run for the Hills" also received an official music video, coinciding with the album release. Critics have described it as a trap-pop and dance-pop record.

McRae embarked on the Think Later World Tour throughout Europe, North America, and Oceania during 2024 in support of the album. The album peaked within the top ten in Canada, Australia, New Zealand, Belgium, Norway, the United Kingdom, Ireland, the Netherlands, Switzerland, Sweden, Denmark, and the United States.

== Background ==
McRae called the experience of writing the album "one of the most stressful, exciting, nerve racking, and fun things [she has] ever gone through", saying that she has lived the past year "a little less with [her] head and a little more with [her] intuition" and hoped that listeners can "feel that through the music". A press release expressed that it explores "the all-too-relatable feelings of falling in love and embracing the raw emotions that you experience as a result of leading with your intuition and heart".

== Promotion ==
The first single "Greedy" was issued on September 15, 2023, later becoming McRae's first top-ten song on the Billboard Hot 100. With the announcement of the album on November 6, 2023, McRae detailed the 53-date Think Later World Tour in support of the album, which will visit Europe, North America and Oceania from April to November 2024. On October 26, McRae performed "Greedy" for the first time on television on Jimmy Kimmel Live!. The second single "Exes" was released on November 17. On November 18, she performed "Greedy" and the track "Grave" on Saturday Night Live. On November 19, she performed "Greedy" at the Billboard Music Awards. She performed "Greedy" and "Exes" on December 9 at the O2 Arena for Jingle Bell Ball. On December 8, McRae released an official music video for "Run for the Hills". On December 12, McRae performed "Greedy" and "Exes" on Today and performed "Exes" on The Tonight Show Starring Jimmy Fallon.

== Critical reception ==
Professional ratings
Aggregate scores
Source	Rating
AnyDecentMusic?	6.5/10
Metacritic	70/100
Review scores
Source	Rating
AllMusic	4/5 stars
Clash	7/10
DIY	3.5/5 stars
Financial Times	4/5 stars
The Guardian	2/5 stars
Irish Examiner	4/5 stars
NME	4/5 stars
The Observer	4/5 stars
Pitchfork	5.9/10
The Telegraph	4/5 stars

Think Later received a score of 70 out of 100 on review aggregator Metacritic based on 10 critics' reviews, indicating "generally favorable" reception. The Telegraph's Neil McCormick found that its "mix of trap grooves and synth balladry is perfectly of the moment, lacking the boldness of a truly original talent. Yet there is something appealing in the sweet melodies and sour attitude of a singer who sounds like she might actually be starting to enjoy herself". NME's Sophie Williams opined that the album is "somewhat remarkable for its evolutions in McRae's delivery and attitude" as it "continues to position [her] as a much more versatile prospect".

Michael Cragg of The Observer wrote that the album "feels like the perfect vehicle for mainstream ubiquity" as "songs such as 'Exes' and the rib-rattling title track continue down 'Greedy''s pop-R&B route, a melodic pocket that suits McRae's rapid-fire delivery". Otis Robinson of DIY felt that the album "doesn't come close to reinventing the wheel (or pop), but it does drench itself within a pop maximalism full of fuel, energy and modernity". Robin Murray of Clash judged that it is as if "by utilising collaboration she's learned to discover her own voice, through listening to other people's. A succinct 14-track demonstration of her palpable skills, Think Later presents Tate McRae in full 360".

Alexis Petridis of The Guardian wrote that the "lyrics stick with the [...] bad boyfriends, bedroom-door-slamming angst and friendship group drama" and highlighted "Greedy", "Stay Done" and "Hurt My Feelings", but commented that they are "surrounded by a surfeit of songs that, while well made, feature melodies that always head where you'd expect – or try too hard". Petridis concluded that McRae is "fitting a lot of currently popular boxes without escaping them". Ed Power of the Irish Examiner called Think Later "a solid album. Yet it's easy to imagine edgier production bringing out the darkness roiling under tracks such as 'Cut My Hair' and 'Greedy'". Arwa Haider of the Financial Times felt that "at points, it does seem like she's trying on different parts for size (temptress; wounded lover; frenemy), but there's no doubting McRae's versatility, and she is always an engaging performer".

Reviewing the album for Pitchfork, Jaeden Pinder described it as "full of homogeneous trap-pop ballads devoted to one-dimensional introspection" and remarked that it "feels anonymous: stuck romanticizing the negative in an attempt to prove her seriousness as a singer. Her music is strongest when she tosses the ballads in the bin". Pinder also likened Think Later to SZA's "love-hate yearning" and the Weeknd's "atmospheric alt-R&B." Michael Cragg said the album produced "a litany of trap-pop smashes", Brittany Spanos said it had Think Later a "bombastic, confident, sexy dance-pop sound".

== Accolades ==
Awards and nominations for "Think Later"
Organization	Year	Category	Result	Ref.
Juno Award	2025	Album of the Year	Won	
Juno Award	2025	Pop Album of the Year	Won	

== Commercial performance ==
Think Later debuted at number four on the US Billboard 200, earning 66,000 album-equivalent units in its first week (consisting of 75.99 million on-demand streams and 8,000 pure album sales). This marked Tate's first top-ten album in the United States. In McRae's home country of Canada, the album debuted at number three, making it McRae's second top-three album in the country.

The album also reached the top five in various countries such as Belgium, New Zealand, Norway, and the United Kingdom, where it debuted at number five on the UK Albums Chart. Think Later also reached the top ten in the Netherlands, Ireland and Switzerland. The album reached its highest peak in Australia, where it peaked at number two.

== Track listing ==
Think Later track listing
No.	Title	Writer(s)	Producer(s)	Length
1.	"Cut My Hair"	Tate McRae; Ryan Tedder; Amy Allen; Jasper Harris	Tedder; Harris; Grant Boutin^{[c]}	2:55
2.	"Greedy"	McRae; Tedder; Allen; Harris	Tedder; Harris; Boutin	2:12
3.	"Run for the Hills"	McRae; Tedder; Allen; Harris; Boutin	Tedder; Harris; Boutin^{[c]}	2:23
4.	"Hurt My Feelings"	McRae; Tedder; Allen; Harris; Boutin	Tedder; Harris; Boutin	2:02
5.	"Grave"	McRae; Brittany Amaradio; Ido Zmishlany	Myles Avery^{[p]}; Luka Kloser^{[p]}; Zmishlany^{[v]}	3:14
6.	"Stay Done"	McRae; Tedder; Allen	Tedder; Andrew DeRoberts	2:51
7.	"Exes"	McRae; Tedder; Tyler Spry	Tedder; Spry^{[p]}	2:39
8.	"We're Not Alike"	McRae; Amaradio; Rob Bisel	Bisel	3:00
9.	"Calgary"	McRae; Zmishlany	Thomas LaRosa; Zmishlany	2:20
10.	"Messier"	McRae; LaRosa; Skyler Stonestreet	LaRosa	3:57
11.	"Think Later"	McRae; Tedder; Allen; Harris	Tedder; Harris; Boutin; Spry^{[a]}	2:13
12.	"Guilty Conscience"	McRae; Tedder; Ilya; Savan Kotecha; Allen	Tedder; Ilya; Avery^{[a]}^{[v]}; Kloser^{[a]}^{[v]}	2:32
13.	"Want That Too"	McRae; Tedder; Allen; Harris; Spry	Tedder; Harris; Harry Charles^{[a]}; Spry^{[v]}	3:10
14.	"Plastic Palm Trees"	McRae; Greg Kurstin; Sarah Aarons	Kurstin; Spry^{[a]}	2:52
Total length:				38:16

Notes

- ^{^[p]} signifies a primary and vocal producer
- ^{^[c]} signifies a co-producer
- ^{^[a]} signifies an additional producer
- ^{^[v]} signifies a vocal producer
- Physical editions of Think Later swap the positions of "Grave" and "Stay Done".

== Personnel ==
Musicians

- Tate McRae – vocals
- Grant Boutin – programming, drums, keyboards, synthesizer (track 2)
- Jasper Harris – programming (track 2)
- Luka Kloser – programming, synthesizer (tracks 5, 12); guitar, keyboards, strings (5)
- Myles Avery – programming, synthesizer (tracks 5, 12); guitar, keyboards, strings (5)
- Tyler Spry – percussion (tracks 7, 11); guitar, keyboards, programming (7, 13, 14); synthesizer (7, 13), bass (7), strings (11), drums (14)
- Rob Bisel – bass, drums, guitar, synthesizer (track 8)
- Harry Charles – programming (tracks 13, 14); keyboards, strings (13); guitar (14)
- Ryan Tedder – programming (track 13)
- Greg Kurstin – bass, drums, guitar, keyboards, piano, synthesizer (track 14)

Technical

- Dave Kutch – mastering
- Manny Marroquin – mixing (tracks 1–3, 5, 6, 8)
- Josh Gudwin – mixing (tracks 4, 7, 9–11, 13, 14)
- Serban Ghenea – mixing (track 12)
- Rich Rich – engineering (tracks 1–4, 6, 7, 11–13)
- Davide Cinci – engineering (track 5)
- Tyler Spry – engineering (tracks 7, 13, 14)
- Rob Bisel – engineering (track 8)
- Thomas LaRosa – engineering (track 10)
- Bryce Bordone – engineering (track 12)
- Greg Kurstin – engineering (track 14)
- Julian Burg – engineering (track 14)
- Joe Henderson – editing (track 13)
- Chris Galland – engineering assistance (tracks 1–3, 5, 6, 8
- Jeremie Inhaber – engineering assistance (tracks 1–3, 5, 6, 8)
- Robin Florent – engineering assistance (tracks 1–3, 5, 6, 8)
- Felix Byrne – engineering assistance (tracks 4, 7, 9–11, 13, 14)

== Charts ==
=== Weekly charts ===
Weekly chart performance for Think Later
Chart (2023–2024)	Peak position
Australian Albums (ARIA)	2
Austrian Albums (Ö3 Austria)	13
Belgian Albums (Ultratop Flanders)	5
Belgian Albums (Ultratop Wallonia)	44
Canadian Albums (Billboard)	3
Danish Albums (Hitlisten)	10
Dutch Albums (Album Top 100)	6
Finnish Albums (Suomen virallinen lista)	12
French Albums (SNEP)	41
German Albums (Offizielle Top 100)	33
Hungarian Albums (MAHASZ)	20
Icelandic Albums (Tónlistinn)	33
Irish Albums (Official Charts)	6
Italian Albums (FIMI)	51
Lithuanian Albums (AGATA)	11
New Zealand Albums (RMNZ)	4
Norwegian Albums (VG-lista)	2
Polish Albums (ZPAV)	22
Portuguese Albums (AFP)	39
Scottish Albums (Official Charts)	23
Spanish Albums (Promusicae)	21
Swedish Albums (Sverigetopplistan)	4
Swiss Albums (Schweizer Hitparade)	8
UK Albums (Official Charts)	5
US Billboard 200	4

=== Year-end charts ===
2024 year-end chart performance for Think Later
Chart (2024)	Position
Australian Albums (ARIA)	49
Belgian Albums (Ultratop Flanders)	51
Canadian Albums (Billboard)	22
Danish Albums (Hitlisten)	84
Dutch Albums (Album Top 100)	56
French Albums (SNEP)	140
New Zealand Albums (RMNZ)	31
Polish Albums (ZPAV)	95
Swedish Albums (Sverigetopplistan)	67
US Billboard 200	52

2025 year-end chart performance for Think Later
Chart (2025)	Position
Australian Albums (ARIA)	44
Belgian Albums (Ultratop Flanders)	80
Dutch Albums (Album Top 100)	91
French Albums (SNEP)	187
US Billboard 200	118

== Certifications ==
Certifications for Think Later
Region	Certification	Certified units/sales
Australia (ARIA)	Gold	35,000^{‡}
Austria (IFPI Austria)	Gold	7,500^{‡}
Belgium (BRMA)	Gold	10,000^{‡}
Brazil (Pro-Música Brasil)	Platinum	40,000^{‡}
Canada (Music Canada)	Platinum	80,000^{‡}
Denmark (IFPI Danmark)	Platinum	20,000^{‡}
France (SNEP)	Gold	50,000^{‡}
Hungary (MAHASZ)	Gold	2,000^{‡}
Italy (FIMI)	Gold	25,000^{‡}
Netherlands (NVPI)	Gold	18,600^{‡}
New Zealand (RMNZ)	2× Platinum	30,000^{‡}
Norway (IFPI Norway)	Platinum	20,000^{‡}
Poland (ZPAV)	Platinum	20,000^{‡}
Portugal (AFP)	Gold	3,500^{‡}
Sweden (GLF)	Gold	15,000^{‡}
United Kingdom (BPI)	Gold	100,000^{‡}
United States (RIAA)	Platinum	1,000,000^{‡}
^{‡} Sales+streaming figures based on certification alone.

== Release history ==
Release dates and formats for Think Later
Region	Date	Format(s)	Label	Ref.
Various	December 8, 2023	CD; digital download; streaming	RCA	
Various	February 16, 2024	LP	RCA	
