= Saturn (SZA song) =

Single by SZA

from the album SOS Deluxe: Lana
- Released: February 22, 2024
- Genre: R&B
- Length: 3:06
- Label: Top Dawg; RCA
- Songwriters: Solána Rowe; Rob Bisel; Carter Lang; Jared Solomon; Scott Zhang; Cian Ducrot
- Producers: Rob Bisel; Carter Lang; Monsune; Solomonophonic

SZA singles chronology
"Rich Baby Daddy" (2023)	"Saturn" (2024)	"Luther" (2024)

Audio
- "Saturn" on YouTube

"Saturn" is a song by American singer-songwriter SZA and the lead single of SOS Deluxe: Lana (2024), the reissue of her second studio album SOS (2022). The song was surprise-released via streaming services on February 22, 2024, by Top Dawg Entertainment and RCA Records. SZA wrote "Saturn" originally for the standard edition of SOS, but it was scrapped from the final tracklist due to time constraints.

"Saturn" is a slow to mid-tempo R&B song, with a twinkly instrumental consisting of a synth line and a boom bap beat. The production features beaming arpeggios, melismas, and vocal harmonies. In the lyrics, SZA reflects on misery and fantasizes about moving to Saturn to escape Earth's problems. Lamenting the world's injustices and questioning why bad things happen to good people, she believes Saturn may offer freedom from pain and self-destruction. Recognizing a literal escape is impossible, however, SZA also sings about trying to find something worth saving on Earth.

Critics wrote positively about "Saturn". They praised the composition as being dreamy and mellifluous, calling the song catchy. Other reviewers complimented its particular style of contemplative writing. In the US, "Saturn" peaked at number 6 on the Billboard Hot 100 chart, becoming SZA's tenth top-10 there. The song also peaked within the top 10 of countries like Australia, Canada, New Zealand, and the Philippines. At the 67th Annual Grammy Awards, "Saturn" was nominated for Best R&B Performance and Best R&B Song, the latter of which it won. It was included in set lists for the Grand National Tour (2025), during which SZA performed the song in a butterfly costume.

== Background ==
In late 2022, American singer-songwriter SZA released SOS, her second studio album widely acclaimed for its diaristic songwriting. (Note: Critics praised the album's candid lyrics as being articulately written and emotionally impactful, saying that SOS solidified SZA's reputation of expressing vulnerability that resonates with the insecure.) Shortly after this, she began teasing a deluxe edition for the album, alluding to its release in interviews and social media posts. In August 2023, she told Variety that the deluxe version had evolved into an entirely different project. SZA called it Lana, referring to it as a "B-side" to SOS. It would consist of new songs created after SOS was released, alongside outtakes recorded for the original album.

One month after the interview, on September 8, SZA told fans in an invite-only Brooklyn Navy Yard concert that Lana would be released soon. She performed four unreleased songs that would eventually appear on its tracklist, including one called "Saturn". (Note: Apart from "Saturn", SZA also included "BMF", "Diamond Boy (DTM)", and "PSA". The first two were released as part of Lana's standard edition in 2024; "PSA" was released the following year as a track from the extended version.) SZA publicly debuted the song at the 66th Annual Grammy Awards, held on February 4, 2024, as part of a Mastercard commercial break.

== Music and production ==
Sample of "Saturn" (2024)
"Saturn" features a twinkly instrumental with arpeggios, a synth line, and a midtempo boom bap beat; it also contains vocal runs and layered vocal harmonies. The song's soundscape has been variously described as glittery, dreamy, and celestial.

"Saturn" is an R&B song with elements of pop, alternative, and psychedelic music. It is characterized by a twinkly instrumental, incorporating arpeggios in the production, and has a slow to mid-tempo pace. The song's sound has often been described as dreamy; critics like Rolling Stone's Larisha Paul have also compared the melody to the feeling of being in outer space. Meanwhile, Alex Hudson of Exclaim! found the production reminiscent of a music box. In an article for Consequence, Mary Siroky summarized the song's sound as being "glittery and dreamy, transportive and meditative, all qualities that often coalesce to create a SZA track."

"Saturn" was written by SZA alongside its producers Carter Lang, Rob Bisel, Solomonophonic (Jared Solomon), and Monsune (Scott Zhang), as well as Cian Ducrot. The song's production is built around a synth line and a boom bap beat; instruments include guitars, keyboards, and drums. SZA's performance incorporates melismas, a vocal technique commonly associated with R&B music. The song also features vocal harmonization. Critics wrote that SZA's voice, alongside the tranquil sound, directly contrasts the lyrics' exploration of hopelessness.

"Saturn" is an SOS outtake. SZA began working on the song during sessions for the album, with the intent of potentially including it on the final tracklist. By 2022, a demo for it had already been created, but the song was scrapped from SOS due to time constraints. According to Ducrot, the demo was finished too close to the date SZA was supposed to submit the album to label executives.

== Lyrics ==
SZA summarized the message of "Saturn" as being about "the longing for things to be better on [Earth] and we want to go somewhere else, but we can't, so we have to find something worth saving here." As such, escapism and despair are some of the song's main themes. In the lyrics, SZA fantasizes about leaving Earth for Saturn, believing it a refuge from worldly problems and suffering. She also sings about agency, in particular the need to take control of oneself and improve in the midst of overwhelming turmoil. Several critics interpreted the lyrics and title of "Saturn" as a reference to Saturn returns, an astrological concept associated with adult challenges and self-discoveries. (Note: The song was often mentioned alongside two songs about Saturn returns – Kacey Musgraves' "Deeper Well" and Ariana Grande's "Saturn Returns Interlude" – that were released weeks apart. Scottish astrologist Diana Garland told BBC News in March 2024 that SZA, Musgraves, and Grande were in the "perfect age" to reflect on personal growth and develop an "appetite for new learning through building", which she argued was the inspiration behind the Saturn references. SZA was 34 years old at the time, and a Saturn return is said to occur 29.5 years after a person's birth.)

On "Saturn", SZA reflects on life's struggles from a nihilistic perspective. The song begins with the lines, "[i]f there's another universe, please make some noise / Give me a sign / This can't be life." The lyrics depict an existential crisis – in the song, SZA sings that she wants more to living on Earth than constant pain and injustice. She reflects on two concepts from Hinduism and Buddhism: karma (cause and effect) and nirvana (freedom from suffering). SZA sings about how bad things often happen to good people and how so many of them "die young and poor", questioning how fair life really is. She laments that nirvana was "not as advertised" and challenges the concept behind good karma: "If there's a point to being good / Then where's my reward?" In the pre-chorus, she sings that she does not believe in paradise and feels like she is living in hell.

When writing "Saturn", SZA was inspired by Stevie Wonder's namesake song, in which he portrays the planet as a place free of pollution, destruction, and death. In the chorus, SZA expresses a desire to abandon loneliness, heartbreak, and self-destruction, believing she can achieve this on Saturn. She sings, "Life's better on Saturn / Got to break this pattern / Of floating away." Across the song, she reflects on finding world suffering unbearable and entertains the thought that nothing matters. Realizing leaving Earth is impossible, she knows she must "find something worth saving". She continues, "it's all for the taking, I always say", urging herself to practice self-discipline, take control, and improve the world.

== Release ==
"Saturn" is the lead single from Lana, the deluxe reissue of SOS. (Note: The released version of Lana (2024), while promoted as a deluxe edition of SOS, is functionally a reissue – the newly released songs appear before the 23 standard SOS tracks.) The song was surprise-released via streaming and download platforms on February 22, 2024, by Top Dawg Entertainment and RCA Records. This release was formatted as a five-track bundle consisting of the original version, a sped-up version, an instrumental version, a vocals-only version, and the audio from the Mastercard performance. (Note: Sometime later, the audio for the bundle's tracks was updated with changes to the mixing.) "Saturn" impacted rhythmic and urban radio in the US on March 5, 2024, then pop radio on March 12.

== Commercial performance ==
In the US, "Saturn" debuted and peaked at number 6 on the Billboard Hot 100, becoming her tenth top-10 on the chart. The song opened with first-week figures of 25 million US streams, 2,000 downloads, and 960,000 reached via radio. Furthermore, it peaked at number 3 on Hot R&B/Hip-Hop Songs. On its component chart Hot R&B Songs, "Saturn" replaced "Snooze" (2023), another SZA single, at number 1. In doing so, she completed a one-year consecutive run atop the chart. "Saturn" was also, respectively, SZA's third and sixth song to top Pop Airplay and Rhythmic Airplay; the single peaked at number 27 on Adult Pop Airplay.

Worldwide, "Saturn" accrued 43.3 million streams and 2,000 downloads during its first week. With these figures, the song debuted on the Billboard Global 200 at its peak of number 5. Top-10 peaks outside the US were achieved in New Zealand (5), Singapore (5), Malaysia (6), Indonesia (6), Australia (8), the Philippines (8), and Canada (8). The song reached the top 20 in the UK, UAE, and South African charts, respectively peaking at numbers 15, 18, and 20.

"Saturn" has received platinum or multi-platinum certifications in various countries. It was certified four-times platinum in the US, three-times platinum in New Zealand and Canada, and platinum in the UK. In Denmark, meanwhile, the song was certified gold.

== Critical reception ==
=== Reviews ===
Various music critics praised "Saturn" for its composition and production, calling it catchy and mellifluous. HotNewHipHop's Gabriel Bras Nevares and Variety's Steven Horowitz found the song as melodically pleasant as SZA's previous works. Horowitz, in particular, argued that "Saturn" recreated the specific musicality that made much of SOS appealing. The song was also praised for the vocal performance; for example, Consequence's Paolo Ragusa and Pitchfork's Shaad D'Souza respectively complimented SZA's voice as "honeyed" and "shivery [and] extraterrestrial". Ragusa, alongside other critics, argued that her vocals did well in elevating "Saturn"'s pensive lyrics. To them, the song showed that SZA uses her voice and sense of melody with great skill in creating emotionally resonant music. Ragusa, who wrote that "Saturn" sounded like a "cosmic breakthrough", lauded the performance for making a heavily existential and lonely song feel pleasant and serene.

The lyrics were also a subject of praise. Some critics asserted that its introspective style was a testament to how well SZA's writing captures emotional vulnerability. In his review of Lana's standard tracks, Mackenzie Cummings-Grady of Billboard argued that with "Saturn", SZA showed that nobody can write about human suffering and breaking toxic habits more articulately than she can. Horowitz found her exploration of despair "expertly woven" and described it as a continuation of the songwriting choices that allowed SOS to resonate with many. Vibe's Regina Cho called "Saturn" a timeless record due to the songwriting, which she said "[gave SZA's] music the depth that R&B lovers cherish".

=== Rankings ===
"Saturn" placed in several media outlets' year-end lists for their best 2024 songs. These publications included Pitchfork (46th), Rolling Stone (45th), and Billboard (23rd). The song placed within the top 20 in the lists by Consequence, at number 18, and the Los Angeles Times, at number 16. In an unranked Variety listicle, Horowitz explained the reason for placing "Saturn": "SZA is so adept at capturing the hopelessness of feeling alone, or that your time has been wasted, that [it] plays like an affirmation [...] Expatriating to another planet is, admittedly, extreme, but she makes it so convincing that you feel like it’s the only solution to heartbreak."

In a 2025 ranking of SZA's discography, which spanned 13 years' worth of music, The Guardian critic Alexis Petridis rated "Saturn" as her 10th-best song. He praised it as being on par with the tracks on SOS's standard edition in terms of quality.

=== Accolades ===
In 2024, "Saturn" was nominated for the BET Her Award, the MTV Video Music Award for Song of Summer, and the Billboard Music Award for Top R&B Song. The following year, it won Best R&B Song at the 67th Annual Grammy Awards – where it was also nominated for Best R&B Performance – and Favorite R&B Song at the 2025 American Music Awards. "Saturn" received more 2025 nominations at the NAACP Image Awards and the iHeartRadio Music Awards, respectively for Outstanding Soul/R&B Song and Best Lyrics.

List of awards and nominations received by "Saturn"
Year	Award	Category	Result	Ref.
2024	BET Awards	BET HER Award	Nominated	
2024	MTV Video Music Awards	Song of Summer	Nominated	
2024	Billboard Music Awards	Top R&B Song	Nominated	
2025	Grammy Awards	Best R&B Song	Won	
2025	Grammy Awards	Best R&B Performance	Nominated	
2025	NAACP Image Awards	Outstanding Soul/R&B Song	Nominated	
2025	iHeartRadio Music Awards	Best Lyrics	Nominated	
2025	American Music Awards	Favorite R&B Song	Won	

== Live performances ==
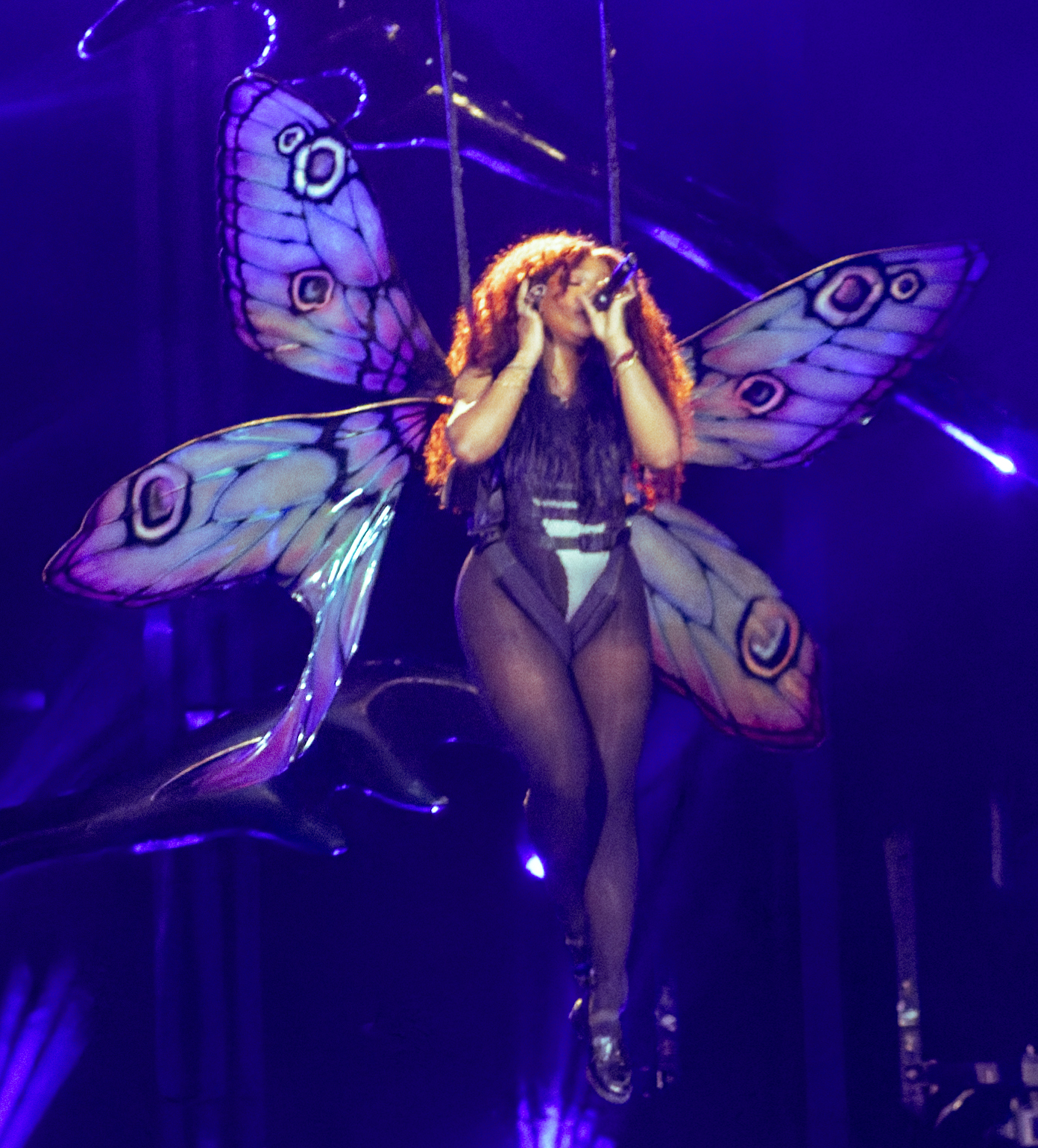
SZA performed "Saturn" during the Grand National Tour in a butterfly costume.

SZA's Mastercard performance began with her hanging from a vine as she descended towards a forest-themed stage. Backup dancers accompanied her as she walked across the forest; later, she found a swing and swung from it. After the performance, SZA read an advertisement for a forest restoration campaign by Mastercard, which sought to plant 100 million trees worldwide as a step towards fighting climate change.

Following the song's release, SZA performed "Saturn" across various music festivals worldwide. The song was part of her set lists for Lollapalooza Chile in March 2024, BST Hyde Park in June, Glastonbury in July, and Osheaga and the US Lollapalooza in August.

SZA included "Saturn" in certain shows of the 2025 Grand National Tour, which she co-headlined in promotion of Lana. (Note: SZA headlined the Grand National Tour with rapper Kendrick Lamar, who embarked on the tour in support of his album GNX (2024).) The song was performed during the concerts' seventh act, for which she was dressed initially in a long gown resembling a cocoon. A harness carried SZA off the stage midway through the performance, and the gown was slowly removed. This revealed a pair of butterfly wings on SZA's back, recalling a butterfly's growth from chrysalis to adulthood.

== Track listing ==
- Digital download and streaming
1. "Saturn" – 3:06
2. "Saturn" (live) – 3:01
3. "Saturn" (sped up) – 2:39
4. "Saturn" (acapella) – 3:06
5. "Saturn" (instrumental) – 3:06

== Credits ==
Adapted from Tidal

- Solána Rowe (SZA) – songwriting, lead vocals
- Rob Bisel – songwriting, production, background vocals, guitar, keyboards, programming, engineering, mixing
- Carter Lang – songwriting, production, background vocals, guitar, keyboards, programming
- Jared Solomon (Solomonophonic) – songwriting, production, drums, keyboards
- Scott Zhang (Monsune) – songwriting, production, keyboards
- Cian Ducrot – songwriting, background vocals
- Hector Castro – engineering
- Hayden Duncan – assistant engineering
- Katie Harvey – assistant engineering
- Robert N. Johnson – assistant engineering
- Noah McCorkle – assistant engineering
- Trey Pearce – assistant engineering
- Syd Tagle – assistant engineering
- Dale Becker – mastering

== Charts ==
=== Weekly charts ===
Weekly chart performance for "Saturn"
Chart (2024–2025)	Peak position
Australia (ARIA)	8
Australia Hip Hop/R&B (ARIA)	1
Canada Hot 100 (Billboard)	8
Canada CHR/Top 40 (Billboard)	6
Canada Hot AC (Billboard)	31
Global 200 (Billboard)	5
Greece International (IFPI)	60
Indonesia (Billboard)	6
Ireland (IRMA)	21
Japan Hot Overseas (Billboard Japan)	12
Malaysia (Billboard)	6
Malaysia International (RIM)	4
Netherlands (Single Top 100)	60
New Zealand (Recorded Music NZ)	5
Philippines (Billboard)	8
Portugal (AFP)	79
Singapore (RIAS)	5
South Africa (TOSAC)	20
Sweden (Sverigetopplistan)	49
Switzerland (Schweizer Hitparade)	96
UAE (IFPI)	18
UK Singles (Official Charts)	15
UK Hip Hop/R&B (Official Charts)	3
US Billboard Hot 100	6
US Adult Pop Airplay (Billboard)	27
US Hot R&B/Hip-Hop Songs (Billboard)	3
US Pop Airplay (Billboard)	1
US Rhythmic Airplay (Billboard)	1

=== Year-end charts ===
Year-end chart performance for "Saturn"
Chart (2024)	Position
Australia (ARIA)	43
Australia Hip Hop/R&B (ARIA)	6
Canada (Canadian Hot 100)	50
Global 200 (Billboard)	79
New Zealand (Recorded Music NZ)	26
Philippines (Philippines Hot 100)	21
US Billboard Hot 100	19
US Hot R&B/Hip-Hop Songs (Billboard)	5
US Mainstream Top 40 (Billboard)	12
US Rhythmic (Billboard)	4

== Certifications ==
Certifications
Region	Certification	Certified units/sales
Canada (Music Canada)	3× Platinum	240,000^{‡}
Denmark (IFPI Danmark)	Gold	45,000^{‡}
New Zealand (RMNZ)	3× Platinum	90,000^{‡}
United Kingdom (BPI)	Platinum	600,000^{‡}
United States (RIAA)	4× Platinum	4,000,000^{‡}
^{‡} Sales+streaming figures based on certification alone.

== Release history ==
Release dates and formats
Region	Date	Format	Label	Ref.
Various	February 22, 2024	Digital download; streaming	Top Dawg; RCA	
United States	March 5, 2024	Rhythmic contemporary radio; urban contemporary radio	Top Dawg; RCA	
United States	March 12, 2024	Contemporary hit radio	Top Dawg; RCA	

== See also ==
- List of Billboard Hot 100 top-ten singles in 2024
- Billboard Year-End Hot 100 singles of 2024
- List of Billboard Pop Airplay number-one songs of 2024
- List of Billboard Rhythmic number-one songs of the 2020s
- List of Billboard Global 200 top-ten singles in 2024
- List of top 10 singles for 2024 in Australia
- List of number-one urban singles of 2024 (Australia)
- New Zealand top 50 singles of 2024
