= YSB Tril =

American rapper (born 2001)

- Also known as: Trilly
- Born: Tae Malik Riley; March 8, 2001 (age 25)
- Genres: Hip hop; trap
- Occupations: Rapper; songwriter
- Instrument: Vocals
- Years active: 2019-present
- Label: Geffen Records

Tae Malik Riley (born March 8, 2001), known professionally as YSB Tril, is an American rapper from Clayton, North Carolina. He is known for his track, "Hotshot" with Bankrol Hayden, which went viral on social media. The track appears on his debut studio album, Hotshot, which was released in 2021 under Geffen Records. He then followed up with his EP, Starstruck 2 in 2022.

His track, "Count Me In", was featured on the Madden NFL 22 soundtrack. Additionally, his track, "Do The Most", was featured on the NBA 2K21 Next-Gen soundtrack.

== Early life ==
Tae Malik Riley was born on March 8, 2001. He played football through high school.

== Career ==
In 2019, Riley released the first installment of Starstruck. On June 29, 2021, Riley released his breakout studio album titled Hotshot after signing with Geffen Records. The track, "Touchdown", with Bankrol Hayden, went viral on social media with the music video gaining over 700,000 views on YouTube a week after it was published. On March 25, 2022, he released his second installation of the series and EP, titled Starstruck 2.

== Musical style and artistry ==
Riley's musical style stems from melodic rap, a subgenre of hip-hop and pop. He is known for exuding confidence throughout his tracks.
