= Run for the Hills (song) =

- Spotify Outside edition artwork

Promotional single by Tate McRae

from the album Think Later
- Released: December 8, 2023
- Genre: Trap-pop; electro-R&B
- Length: 2:23
- Label: RCA
- Songwriters: Tate McRae; Amy Allen; Grant Boutin; Ryan Tedder; Jasper Harris
- Producers: Ryan Tedder; Jasper Harris

Tate McRae promotional singles chronology
| "Don't Come Back" (2022) | "Run for the Hills" (2023) |

Music video
- "Run for the Hills" on YouTube

"Run for the Hills" is a promotional single by Canadian singer Tate McRae from her second studio album, Think Later (2023). She wrote the song with the songwriters Amy Allen and Grant Boutin, and its producers, Ryan Tedder and Jasper Harris. It became available as the album's third track on December 8, 2023, when it was released by RCA Records. A trap-pop and electro-R&B song, "Run for the Hills" describes a toxic fraught relationship which is on the brink of collapse yet persists.

"Run for the Hills" reached the top 60 in Australia, Canada, Ireland, and the United Kingdom and entered the charts in some other countries. The song received a double platinum certification from Music Canada. Its music video was released alongside the song and depicts McRae constantly running while stuck in the same place, mirroring the concept of its lyrics. "Run for the Hills" was also promoted with an acoustic performance filmed for Spotify's Outside series and its inclusion on the set list of her 2024 concert tour, the Think Later World Tour.

== Background ==
Tate McRae wrote "Run for the Hills" with the songwriters Amy Allen and Grant Boutin, and its producers, Ryan Tedder and Jasper Harris. She detailed the song's inspiration in an interview for Apple Music: "I was obsessed with this person. I began to fall in love with the toxicity of it. Usually I'm a really stubborn person and I feel like I can get myself out of any situation, but for some reason I was stuck in this ongoing cycle of being so attached". It was included as the third track on McRae's second studio album, Think Later, which was released on December 8, 2023.

== Composition ==
"Run for the Hills" is a pop, trap-pop, and electro-R&B song which describes a fraught relationship on the brink of its conclusion yet persistent. In the song, McRae describes continuing to be with somebody even though one feels they should part ways. CBC.ca included it in their five favorite songs on Think Later, with Melody Lau stating: "On this track, she's well aware that she's caught in a toxic relationship [...] Her voice is desperate, words spilling out like she's trying to convince herself that she's in control [...] But the reality is that she's hopelessly obsessed, trapped in a purgatory of lust and repeated heartbreak".

== Promotion ==
On December 8, 2023, McRae released the music video for "Run for the Hills". While announcing the video on Instagram, she stated it was "very special" and elaborated on its concept: "this video represents a never ending relationship -- kinda like you're constantly running but constantly running in place, never able to break the cycle". McRae performed an acoustic version of the song on the top of a hill at Harbor Studios in Malibu, California, accompanied by a guitarist, for Spotify's Outside series. It was included as the second-last song on the set list of her 2024 concert tour, the Think Later World Tour.

== Commercial performance ==
"Run for the Hills" debuted at number 69 on the US Billboard Hot 100 issued for December 23, 2023. In Canada, the song reached number 34 on the Canadian Hot 100 issued for January 13, 2024, and was certified double platinum by Music Canada. It entered the UK Singles Chart at number 55. In Australia, "Run for the Hills" debuted at number 54. The song entered the New Zealand Hot Singles chart at number 3. It charted at number 76 on the Billboard Global 200. "Run for the Hills" reached national record charts, at number 39 in Ireland, number 81 in the Netherlands, number 96 in Sweden, and number 140 in Portugal.

== Charts ==
Chart positions for "Run for the Hills"
| Chart (2023) | Peak position |
|---|---|
| Australia (ARIA) | 54 |
| Canada Hot 100 (Billboard) | 34 |
| Global 200 (Billboard) | 76 |
| Ireland (IRMA) | 39 |
| Netherlands (Single Top 100) | 81 |
| New Zealand Hot Singles (RMNZ) | 3 |
| Portugal (AFP) | 140 |
| Sweden (Sverigetopplistan) | 96 |
| UK Singles (Official Charts) | 55 |
| US Billboard Hot 100 | 69 |

== Certifications ==
Certifications for "Run for the Hills"
| Region | Certification | Certified units/sales |
|---|---|---|
| Austria (IFPI Austria) | Gold | 15,000^{‡} |
| Brazil (Pro-Música Brasil) | Gold | 20,000^{‡} |
| Canada (Music Canada) | 2× Platinum | 160,000^{‡} |
| Denmark (IFPI Danmark) | Gold | 45,000^{‡} |
| New Zealand (RMNZ) | Platinum | 30,000^{‡} |
| United Kingdom (BPI) | Gold | 400,000^{‡} |
| United States (RIAA) | Platinum | 1,000,000^{‡} |
^{‡} Sales+streaming figures based on certification alone.
