= Birds of a Feather (Billie Eilish song) =

2024 single by Billie Eilish

Single by Billie Eilish

from the album Hit Me Hard and Soft
- Written: February 16, 2023 – January 2024
- Released: June 18, 2024
- Recorded: 2023 – 2024
- Studio: Finneas's home studio (Los Angeles)
- Genre: Baroque pop; indie pop; new wave; synth-pop
- Length: 3:30
- Label: Darkroom; Interscope
- Songwriters: Billie Eilish; Finneas O'Connell
- Producer: Finneas O'Connell

Billie Eilish singles chronology
"Lunch" (2024)	"Birds of a Feather" (2024)	"Guess" (2024)

Music video
- "Birds of a Feather" on YouTube

"Birds of a Feather" is a song by American singer-songwriter Billie Eilish from her third studio album, Hit Me Hard and Soft (2024). It was released with the album on May 17, 2024, and was made the second official single on June 18, 2024, through Darkroom and Interscope Records. Eilish wrote the song with her brother, Finneas O'Connell, who recorded and produced it at his home studio in Los Angeles. A baroque pop, indie pop, new wave, and synth-pop song, "Birds of a Feather" explores themes of deep love and a desire for lasting connection.

"Birds of a Feather" topped the Billboard Global 200 and the national charts of nine countries, including Australia, Croatia, Estonia, Iceland, Latvia, Lithuania, Malaysia, New Zealand, and Singapore. The song additionally peaked at number two in nine other countries. It has been certified Diamond in France and multi-platinum in Australia, Canada, Greece, New Zealand, Poland, Portugal, the United Kingdom, and the United States. It was the fourth-best-selling song of 2024 globally according to the International Federation of the Phonographic Industry (IFPI). "Birds of a Feather" was nominated for Song of the Year, Record of the Year, and Best Pop Solo Performance at the 67th Annual Grammy Awards in 2025.

== Background and release ==
Billie Eilish first previewed "Birds of a Feather" on May 13, 2024, through a teaser trailer for the third season of the Netflix series Heartstopper. The song was one of three teased ahead of the album's release. In an interview with Apple Music, Eilish revealed that the song contains the highest belt of her career. It was released as a single on June 18, 2024, the second from Hit Me Hard and Soft.

== Composition ==
A pop, baroque pop, indie pop, new wave, and synth-pop song, "Birds of a Feather" borrows its title from the English idiom "birds of a feather flock together". In an "emotionally vulnerable" tone, Eilish sings about falling in love with a person that she wants to "stick together" with. The love for her significant other brings her to tears, and she begs her lover to stay and never end their relationship.

== Critical reception ==
Mikael Wood of the Los Angeles Times described "Birds of a Feather" as a "breezy neo-new-wave jam", Alisa Ali of NPR wrote that the song's "poignant lyricism hides amid the dark humor and [Eilish's] clever cadence makes for one of the singer's most memorable vocal performances". Tom Taylor of Far Out classified it as "a classic pop chorus with Eilish burst out in a blushing [19]80s pop vocal", adding that it "has a sort of hook that would have old-fashioned music bigwigs screaming, 'It's a hit', but cleverly, the song doesn't give itself up to that and heads back to nuanced verses, layering in a touch more sincerity to undercut the bubblegum synth whistle". In 2026, writers for Time Out named "Birds of a Feather" the best love song of all-time.

=== Year-end lists ===
Critics' year-end rankings of "Birds of a Feather"
Publication	List	Rank	Ref.
Billboard	The 100 Best Songs of 2024	4	
Complex	The 50 Best Songs of 2024	4	
Elle	The 42 Best Songs of 2024	—N/a	
Exclaim!	20 Best Songs of 2024	20	
Los Angeles Times	The 30 Best Songs of 2024	9	
NME	50 Best Songs of 2024	12	
NPR	124 Best Songs of 2024	—N/a	
Pitchfork	The 100 Best Songs of 2024	27	
Rolling Stone	The 100 Best Songs of 2024	5	
Slant Magazine	The 50 Best Songs of 2024	1	
The Guardian	The 20 Best Songs of 2024	5	
The New York Times	Lindsay Zoladz's Best Songs of 2024	4	
The Ringer	The 11 Best Songs of 2024	7	
Time Out	The Best Songs of 2024	2	
Uproxx	The Best Songs of 2024	—N/a	
USA Today	The 10 Best Songs of 2024	3	

== Commercial performance ==
=== United States ===
Following the release of Hit Me Hard and Soft, "Birds of a Feather" debuted at number 13 on the Billboard Hot 100 chart issue dated June 1, 2024, the highest-placing track from the album after "Chihiro" at number twelve and the lead single "Lunch" at number five. In its fourth week, the then-album cut rose from number eleven to number nine on the chart, its peak position as a non-single track. In its thirteenth week on the Hot 100, "Birds of a Feather" reached a new peak of number five, while rising to the top of the multimetric Hot Rock & Alternative Songs and Hot Alternative Songs charts in its twelfth week. It surpassed 30 weeks atop both charts, becoming the first song by a female artist to achieve the feat on the former and the first song by a lead female artist to do so on the latter. "Birds of a Feather" was the ninth-most-streamed song of 2024 in US on-demand audio, with 660.7 million streams, and the tenth-most-streamed song in 2025, with 511.8 million streams.

Following its music video release, the song reached a new peak of number two on the Hot 100, becoming her highest placement since "Therefore I Am" in 2020 and the highest-charting song from Hit Me Hard and Soft. The single was certified quintuple Platinum by the Recording Industry Association of America (RIAA) on March 14, 2025. "Birds of a Feather" became Eilish's first song to chart for over a year (52 weeks) inside the Billboard Hot 100, surpassing "Bad Guy" (49 weeks). The song accumulated 50 weeks on the Pop Airplay chart after topping it for eight weeks, making it the longest-charting solo song by a female artist in the chart's history and the sixth overall, tied with the Weeknd's "Die for You".

=== Worldwide ===
In the United Kingdom, "Birds of a Feather" debuted at number nine on the UK Singles Chart during the week of the album's release. The song was the third best after "Chihiro" at number seven and "Lunch" at number two. Following its increase in popularity, the song reached its peak of number two on the UK Singles Chart. The single was certified quadruple Platinum by the British Phonographic Industry (BPI) on April 24, 2026.

In Australia, "Birds of a Feather" debuted at number nine on the ARIA Singles Chart during the album's release week. It later topped the chart for two weeks, marking Eilish's fourth number one in the country. The song remained inside the top ten for 54 weeks, becoming the female song with the most weeks spent in the top ten in the chart's history and the third overall. The single was certified ten-times Platinum by the Australian Recording Industry Association (ARIA). Elsewhere, it topped the charts in various countries, including Iceland, Latvia, Lithuania, New Zealand, and Singapore and peaked within the top ten of the charts in Canada, the Czech Republic, India, Indonesia, Ireland, Luxembourg, the Philippines, Portugal, Saudi Arabia, and Switzerland. It also topped the Billboard Global 200 chart.

"Birds of a Feather" became the most-streamed song in a calendar year on Spotify in 2024, surpassing Sabrina Carpenter's "Espresso". It also became the fastest song to surpass three billion streams (at the time) and the first solo song by a female artist to surpass four billion streams on the platform. The song was also the ninth-most-streamed song globally on Apple Music in 2024 and fifth in 2025. In 2025, "Birds of a Feather" was Spotify's second-most-streamed song worldwide. It is the most-streamed solo song by a female artist on the platform.

== Music video ==
Teased a day prior, an accompanying music video for "Birds of a Feather", directed by Aidan Zamiri, was released on September 27, 2024, and was filmed at the Westin Bonaventure Hotel in Los Angeles. In the video, Eilish is shown singing in an abandoned office building while being dragged around by the arm by an invisible force; Sarah Kearns of Hypebeast interpreted this as "a symbol that seems to relay the feeling of being pulled in different directions by someone who isn't actually present".

== Accolades ==
Awards and nominations
Year	Award	Category	Result	Ref.
2024	MTV Video Music Awards	Song of the Summer	Nominated	
2024	MTV Europe Music Awards	Best Song	Nominated	
2024	Danish Music Awards	International Hit of the Year	Nominated	
2024	Musa Awards	Anglo International Song of the Year	Nominated	
2025	Grammy Awards	Record of the Year	Nominated	
2025	Grammy Awards	Song of the Year	Nominated	
2025	Grammy Awards	Best Pop Solo Performance	Nominated	
2025	iHeartRadio Music Awards	Best Lyrics	Nominated	
2025	Brit Awards	Best International Song	Nominated	
2025	GAFFA Awards (Denmark)	International Song of the Year	Won	
2025	GAFFA Awards (Sweden)	International Hit of the Year	Won	
2025	Music Awards Japan	Best International Alternative Song in Japan	Won	
2025	American Music Awards	Song of the Year	Won	
2025	American Music Awards	Favorite Pop Song	Won	
2025	Rockbjörnen	Foreign Song of the Year	Nominated	
2025	MTV Video Music Awards	Video of the Year	Nominated	
2025	MTV Video Music Awards	Song of the Year	Nominated	

== Live performances ==
Eilish performed the song during the 2024 Summer Olympics closing ceremony on August 11, 2024. The performance was part of the Olympic flag handover from Paris to Los Angeles (who is set to host in 2028) and was recorded the day before at Long Beach. On October 19, 2024, Eilish performed the song on Saturday Night Live alongside "Wildflower". Eilish included "Birds of a Feather" as the final song of the set list of the Hit Me Hard and Soft: The Tour (2024–2025).

Eilish sang the song with Finneas as the last part of a three-song set during the FireAid benefit concert to raise funds for victims of the Los Angeles area wildfires on January 30, 2025. They also performed the song at the 67th Annual Grammy Awards on February 2.

== Charts ==
=== Weekly charts ===
Weekly chart performance
Chart (2024–2025)	Peak position
Argentina Hot 100 (Billboard)	51
Australia (ARIA)	1
Austria (Ö3 Austria Top 40)	3
Belarus Airplay (TopHit)	53
Belgium (Ultratop 50 Flanders)	7
Belgium (Ultratop 50 Wallonia)	3
Bolivia Airplay (Monitor Latino)	9
Brazil Hot 100 (Billboard)	30
Bulgaria Airplay (PROPHON)	6
Canada Hot 100 (Billboard)	3
Canada AC (Billboard)	3
Canada CHR/Top 40 (Billboard)	1
Canada Hot AC (Billboard)	1
Central America Anglo Airplay (Monitor Latino)	3
Chile Airplay (Monitor Latino)	6
Colombia Anglo Airplay (National-Report)	1
CIS Airplay (TopHit)	14
Costa Rica Anglo Airplay (Monitor Latino)	3
Croatia (Billboard)	17
Croatia International Airplay (Top lista)	1
Czech Republic Airplay (ČNS IFPI)	71
Czech Republic Singles Digital (ČNS IFPI)	7
Denmark (Tracklisten)	7
Dominican Republic Anglo Airplay (Monitor Latino)	1
Ecuador Anglo Airplay (Monitor Latino)	3
El Salvador Anglo Airplay (Monitor Latino)	2
Estonia Airplay (TopHit)	1
Finland (Suomen virallinen lista)	23
France (SNEP)	13
Germany (GfK)	4
Global 200 (Billboard)	1
Greece International (IFPI)	3
Guatemala Anglo Airplay (Monitor Latino)	3
Honduras Anglo Airplay (Monitor Latino)	3
Hong Kong (Billboard)	11
Hungary (Editors' Choice Top 40)	8
Hungary (Single Top 40)	34
Iceland (Tónlistinn)	1
India International (IMI)	9
Indonesia (IFPI)	8
Ireland (IRMA)	2
Israel (Mako Hitlist)	30
Italy (FIMI)	31
Japan Hot 100 (Billboard)	70
Kazakhstan Airplay (TopHit)	55
Latin America Anglo Airplay (Monitor Latino)	4
Latvia Airplay (LAIPA)	1
Latvia Streaming (LaIPA)	2
Lebanon (Lebanese Top 20)	5
Lithuania (AGATA)	1
Luxembourg (Billboard)	2
Mexico Airplay (Monitor Latino)	13
Malaysia (IFPI)	6
Malaysia International (RIM)	1
Malta Airplay (Radiomonitor)	3
Middle East and North Africa (IFPI)	2
Netherlands (Dutch Top 40)	5
Netherlands (Single Top 100)	4
New Zealand (Recorded Music NZ)	1
Nicaragua Anglo Airplay (Monitor Latino)	2
Nigeria (TurnTable Top 100)	56
North Macedonia Airplay (Radiomonitor)	6
Norway (VG-lista)	4
Panama Airplay (Monitor Latino)	16
Paraguay Airplay (Monitor Latino)	12
Peru (Billboard)	16
Peru Anglo Airplay (Monitor Latino)	4
Philippines (Philippines Hot 100)	2
Poland (Polish Airplay Top 100)	6
Poland (Polish Streaming Top 100)	9
Portugal (AFP)	3
Puerto Rico Anglo Airplay (Monitor Latino)	3
Romania Airplay (UPFR)	7
Romania Airplay (Media Forest)	3
Romania TV Airplay (Media Forest)	8
Russia Airplay (TopHit)	54
Saudi Arabia (IFPI)	7
Serbia Airplay (Radiomonitor)	7
Singapore (RIAS)	1
Slovakia Airplay (ČNS IFPI)	17
Slovakia Singles Digital (ČNS IFPI)	6
Slovenia Airplay (Radiomonitor)	5
South Africa Airplay (TOSAC)	2
South Africa Streaming (TOSAC)	3
South Korea (Circle)	117
Spain (Promusicae)	42
Sweden (Sverigetopplistan)	5
Switzerland (Schweizer Hitparade)	2
Taiwan (Billboard)	7
Thailand (IFPI)	8
Turkey International Airplay (Radiomonitor Türkiye)	5
United Arab Emirates (IFPI)	2
UK Singles (Official Charts)	2
Uruguay Anglo Airplay (Monitor Latino)	6
US Billboard Hot 100	2
US Adult Contemporary (Billboard)	7
US Adult Pop Airplay (Billboard)	1
US Dance Airplay (Billboard)	16
US Hot Alternative Songs (Billboard)	1
US Hot Rock & Alternative Songs (Billboard)	1
US Pop Airplay (Billboard)	1
Venezuela Airplay (Record Report)	24
Vietnam (Vietnam Hot 100)	66

=== Monthly charts ===
Monthly chart performance
Chart (2024–2026)	Peak position
Belarus Airplay (TopHit)	60
Brazil Streaming (Pro-Música Brasil)	41
CIS Airplay (TopHit)	16
Czech Republic (Singles Digitál Top 100)	13
Estonia Airplay (TopHit)	1
Lithuania Airplay (TopHit)	4
Panama Streaming (PRODUCE)	152
Paraguay Airplay (SGP)	25
Romania Airplay (TopHit)	25
Slovakia (Rádio Top 100)	24
Slovakia (Singles Digitál Top 100)	14
South Korea (Circle)	129

=== Year-end charts ===
2024 year-end chart performance
Chart (2024)	Position
Australia (ARIA)	6
Austria (Ö3 Austria Top 40)	13
Belgium (Ultratop 50 Flanders)	30
Belgium (Ultratop 50 Wallonia)	26
Canada (Canadian Hot 100)	13
CIS Airplay (TopHit)	54
Denmark (Tracklisten)	16
Estonia Airplay (TopHit)	12
France (SNEP)	44
Germany (GfK)	29
Global 200 (Billboard)	7
Global Singles (IFPI)	4
Iceland (Tónlistinn)	3
Lithuania Airplay (TopHit)	5
Netherlands (Dutch Top 40)	12
Netherlands (Single Top 100)	15
New Zealand (Recorded Music NZ)	7
Philippines (Philippines Hot 100)	5
Poland (Polish Airplay Top 100)	32
Poland (Polish Streaming Top 100)	32
Portugal (AFP)	7
Romania Airplay (TopHit)	50
South Africa Streaming (TOSAC)	16
Sweden (Sverigetopplistan)	24
Switzerland (Schweizer Hitparade)	12
UK Singles (OCC)	7
US Billboard Hot 100	15
US Adult Contemporary (Billboard)	49
US Adult Top 40 (Billboard)	27
US Pop Airplay (Billboard)	23
US Hot Rock & Alternative Songs (Billboard)	3
Venezuela Anglo Airplay (Record Report)	19

2025 year-end chart performance
Chart (2025)	Position
Argentina Anglo Airplay (Monitor Latino)	30
Australia (ARIA)	6
Austria (Ö3 Austria Top 40)	13
Belgium (Ultratop 50 Flanders)	20
Belgium (Ultratop 50 Wallonia)	27
Bolivia Anglo Airplay (Monitor Latino)	30
Canada (Canadian Hot 100)	10
Canada AC (Billboard)	8
Canada CHR/Top 40 (Billboard)	14
Canada Hot AC (Billboard)	3
Central America Anglo Airplay (Monitor Latino)	16
Chile Airplay (Monitor Latino)	23
Colombia Anglo Airplay (Monitor Latino)	3
CIS Airplay (TopHit)	45
Costa Rica Anglo Airplay (Monitor Latino)	39
Denmark (Tracklisten)	19
Dominican Republic Anglo Airplay (Monitor Latino)	7
Ecuador Anglo Airplay (Monitor Latino)	9
Estonia Airplay (TopHit)	35
France (SNEP)	44
Germany (GfK)	14
Global 200 (Billboard)	3
Global Singles (IFPI)	6
Guatemala Anglo Airplay (Monitor Latino)	4
Hungary (Single Top 40)	77
Iceland (Tónlistinn)	19
India International (IMI)	12
Lithuania Airplay (TopHit)	25
Mexico Anglo Airplay (Monitor Latino)	6
Netherlands (Dutch Top 40)	71
Netherlands (Single Top 100)	21
New Zealand (Recorded Music NZ)	9
Nicaragua Anglo Airplay (Monitor Latino)	50
Peru Anglo Airplay (Monitor Latino)	3
Philippines (Philippines Hot 100)	10
Poland (Polish Airplay Top 100)	71
Poland (Polish Streaming Top 100)	24
Puerto Rico Anglo Airplay (Monitor Latino)	16
Romania Airplay (TopHit)	58
Sweden (Sverigetopplistan)	14
Switzerland (Schweizer Hitparade)	10
UK Singles (OCC)	11
US Billboard Hot 100	5
US Adult Contemporary (Billboard)	8
US Adult Pop Airplay (Billboard)	4
US Hot Rock & Alternative Songs (Billboard)	1
US Pop Airplay (Billboard)	5

== Certifications ==
Certifications
Region	Certification	Certified units/sales
Australia (ARIA)	10× Platinum	700,000^{‡}
Austria (IFPI Austria)	2× Platinum	60,000^{‡}
Belgium (BRMA)	3× Platinum	120,000^{‡}
Brazil (Pro-Música Brasil)	7× Diamond	1,120,000^{‡}
Canada (Music Canada)	8× Platinum	640,000^{‡}
Denmark (IFPI Danmark)	3× Platinum	270,000^{‡}
France (SNEP)	Diamond	333,333^{‡}
Germany (BVMI)	Platinum	600,000^{‡}
Italy (FIMI)	Platinum	100,000^{‡}
New Zealand (RMNZ)	7× Platinum	210,000^{‡}
Poland (ZPAV)	3× Platinum	150,000^{‡}
Portugal (AFP)	6× Platinum	60,000^{‡}
Spain (Promusicae)	2× Platinum	120,000^{‡}
Switzerland (IFPI Switzerland)	2× Platinum	60,000^{‡}
United Kingdom (BPI)	4× Platinum	2,400,000^{‡}
United States (RIAA)	5× Platinum	5,000,000^{‡}
Streaming
Central America (CFC)	2× Platinum	14,000,000^{†}
Greece (IFPI Greece)	Diamond	10,000,000^{†}
Slovakia (ČNS IFPI)	Platinum	1,700,000
Worldwide	—	2,810,000,000
^{‡} Sales+streaming figures based on certification alone.^{†} Streaming-only figures based on certification alone.

== Release history ==
Release dates and formats
Region	Date	Format	Label(s)	Ref.
United States	June 18, 2024	Contemporary hit radio	Darkroom; Interscope	
Canada	July 8, 2024	Contemporary hit radio	Interscope; Universal	
Italy	August 2, 2024	Radio airplay	EMI	
United States	November 11, 2024	7-inch vinyl	Darkroom; Interscope	

== See also ==
- List of Billboard Pop Airplay number-one songs of 2024
- List of highest-certified singles in Australia
- List of number-one singles of 2024 (Australia)
- List of best-selling singles in Brazil
- List of number-one songs of 2024 (Malaysia)
- List of number-one songs of 2024 (Singapore)
- List of songs which have spent the most weeks on the UK singles chart
- List of Spotify streaming records
- List of UK top-ten singles in 2024
