= Charlieonnafriday =

American rapper and singer-songwriter (born 2003)

charlieonnafriday
- Born: Charlie Malone Finch; February 21, 2003 (age 23); Seattle, Washington, U.S.
- Occupations: Rapper; singer; songwriter
- Years active: 2020–present
- Musical career
- Origin: Seattle, Washington, U.S.
- Genres: Melodic rap; hip hop
- Instrument: Vocals
- Label: Island Records
- Website: Official website

Charlie Malone Finch (born February 21, 2003), known professionally as charlieonnafriday, is an American rapper and singer-songwriter. He gained attention with his debut album OnnaFriday, released by Island Records.

== Early life, education, and personal life ==
Finch was born in Seattle, Washington on Friday, February 21, 2003. He grew up in Seattle's Green Lake neighborhood. He started making music in 8th grade and focused on it more during high school during the COVID-19 pandemic.

He dated YouTuber Sadie Crowell for several months in 2023.

== Career ==
Finch gained attention with his eight-track debut album OnnaFriday, released in April 2022 by Island Records, particularly with the song "After Hours," which has over 100 million streams on Spotify. He has been credited with helping to shape Seattle's modern hip hop sound.

Charlie launched his own brand of merchandise, "OnnaFriday", on October 28, 2022. He was featured on the track "I Know" from fellow Seattle rapper Macklemore's album Ben (2023).

He opened for Tate McRae's Think Later World Tour.

== Discography ==
=== Studio albums ===
List of studio albums
Title	Details
OnnaFriday	Released: April 22, 2022; Label: Onnafriday Records, Island, UMG; Format: Digital download, streaming
Wild Child	Released: August 23, 2024; Label: Onnafriday Records, Island, UMG; Format: Digital download, streaming

=== Singles ===
List of singles, with selected chart positions and albums (if it is a part of an album)
Title	Year	Peak chart positions			Certifications	Album
Title	Year	US Bub.	US Pop	CAN	Certifications	Album
"Gnarly"	2020	—	—	—		Non-album singles
"Good Time"	2020	—	—	—		Non-album singles
"Tonight"	2020	—	—	—		Non-album singles
"Chilling"	2020	—	—	—		Non-album singles
"Friday" (feat. J. Apollo)	2020	—	—	—		Non-album singles
"Hello"	2020	—	—	—		Non-album singles
"After Hours"	2021	—	—	—	RIAA: Platinum; MC: Platinum	OnnaFriday
"VibeOnna10"	2022	—	—	—		OnnaFriday
"Dolla Signs"	2022	—	—	—		OnnaFriday
"Colorado Boulder" (feat. Kidd G)	2022	—	—	—		OnnaFriday
"Misfit" (feat. Lil Keed)	2022	—	—	—		OnnaFriday
"Girl U My Plug"	2022	—	—	—		OnnaFriday
"Fall Again"	2022	—	—	—		OnnaFriday
"Cheers"	2022	—	—	—		OnnaFriday
"Enough"	2022	23	22	88	RIAA: Gold; MC: Platinum	Wild Child
"That's What I Get"	2023	—	—	—		Wild Child
"Same Friends" (feat. Lil Tjay)	2023	—	—	—		Wild Child
"I'm Good" (feat. Natalie Jane)	2023	—	—	—		Non-album singles
"Actress"	2023	—	—	—		Non-album singles
"I'm Not Crazy"	2023	—	—	—		Wild Child
"Undefeated"	2023	—	—	—		Non-album singles
"Somebody New"	2024	—	—	—		Non-album singles
"When I'm Leaving"	2024	—	—	—		Non-album singles
"Warning Shot"	2024	—	—	—		Wild Child
"When It Rains"	2024	—	—	—		Wild Child
"Bottle Go Down"	2024	—	—	—		Wild Child
"—" denotes a recording that did not chart or was not released in that territory.
