= Greedy (Tate McRae song) =

2023 single by Tate McRae

Single by Tate McRae

from the album Think Later
- Released: September 15, 2023
- Recorded: January 2023
- Genre: Dance-pop; R&B
- Length: 2:11
- Label: RCA
- Songwriters: Tate McRae; Amy Allen; Jasper Harris; Ryan Tedder
- Producers: Jasper Harris; Ryan Tedder; Grant Boutin

Tate McRae singles chronology
| "10:35" (2022) | "Greedy" (2023) | "Exes" (2023) |

Music video
- "Greedy" on YouTube

Audio sample
- file; help

"Greedy" is a song by Canadian singer and songwriter Tate McRae. It was released through RCA Records on September 15, 2023, as the lead single of her second studio album Think Later (2023). The dance-pop and R&B song was written by McRae, alongside Amy Allen, Jasper Harris, and OneRepublic lead singer Ryan Tedder; production was handled by the latter two along with Grant Boutin. Lyrically, McRae described the song as an ode to female empowerment.

"Greedy" was commercially successful, peaking at the top of the Canadian Hot 100 and the Billboard Global 200. Outside of Canada, "Greedy" topped the charts in several countries, including Austria, Denmark, Luxembourg, the Netherlands, Norway, and Switzerland. "Greedy" also peaked within the top ten of the charts in countries such as Australia, Belgium, France, Germany, Iceland, Ireland, New Zealand, the United Kingdom, and the United States, and the top 20 of the charts in countries including Finland, Indonesia, Romania, and South Africa. It was the fifth-best-selling song of 2024 globally and is certified Diamond in France as well as Platinum or higher in eighteen additional countries. Additionally, the song won the Juno Award for Single of the Year at the Juno Awards of 2024.

== Background and composition ==
In December 2022, McRae first talked about her new "era" of music, saying that she was "in the zone" for the music and determined on who she wants to be and what to do next. "Greedy" signifies a "new chapter" of music to McRae. It reflects on an encounter she had with a man at a bar, who expressed that he found her mysterious. Upon reflection, McRae agreed with his impression, noting that it "takes a lot" for her to open up. She subsequently wrote "Greedy" about the "feeling of having utter confidence". She described the outcome as a "cool female empowerment song" which she loved. McRae articulated that the song marks the first time people see a "feistier and more playful side" of her, being as "unexpected" as it is.

Greedy was re-written and recorded in January 2023. In an interview with Genius, McRae stated the original lyric in the chorus was "I keep to myself" but was later changed to "I would want myself". McRae first teased the song via TikTok on August 4. The teaser subsequently went viral on the platform with over 200,000 videos made across different sounds. Billboard writer Kyle Denis opined that the song is a "successful example of a concerted TikTok-focused promotional plan", as it was carried to success by snippets steadily teased by McRae rather than a trend.

Sonically pop, dance-pop, and R&B, the sheet music for the song shows the key of F♯ minor in common time with a tempo of 111 beats per minute. The published vocal range spans from F♯_{3} to D_{5} in the song.

== Music video ==
An accompanying music video was released along with the single on September 15, 2023, and was directed by Aerin Moreno. The visuals are set in an empty hockey arena and features McRae driving an ice resurfacer while wearing a hockey glove. The subsequent dance segments were choreographed by Sean Bankhead. Rolling Stone writer Tomás Mier opined that she embraced her Canadian heritage by showing love for hockey.

== Credits and personnel ==
Credits adapted from the song credits of Genius.

Recording

- Mixed at Larrabee Sound Studios

Personnel

- Tate McRae – vocals, songwriter
- Amy Allen – songwriter
- Jasper Harris – producer, songwriter
- Ryan Tedder – executive producer, songwriter
- Grant – producer
- Rich Rich – engineer
- Chris Galland – assistant engineer
- Jeremie Inhaber – assistant engineer
- Robin Florent – assistant engineer
- Manny Marroquin – mix engineer
- Dave Kutch – mastering engineer

== Chart performance ==
The song topped the charts in Austria, Canada, Norway and Denmark, debuting at number one in the latter two countries. It also reached the top 10 in at least 20 countries, including Australia, Belgium, France, Germany, Hungary, Ireland, New Zealand, Poland, Switzerland, the United Kingdom, and the United States, and the top 50 in Brazil and Italy. It is her first song to chart within the top 10 on the Billboard Hot 100, peaking at number three. It became the year-end number one song of 2024 on the Pop Airplay chart after peaking at number one for eight weeks total.

== Accolades ==
Awards and nominations for "Greedy"
| Organization | Year | Category | Result | Ref. |
|---|---|---|---|---|
| Billboard Music Awards | 2024 | Top Radio Song | Nominated | |
| Billboard Music Awards | 2024 | Top Billboard Global 200 Song | Nominated | |
| Billboard Music Awards | 2024 | Top Billboard Global (Exclu. U.S.) Song | Nominated | |
| Brit Awards | 2024 | International Song of the Year | Nominated | |
| Global Awards | 2024 | Best Song | Nominated | |
| iHeartRadio Music Awards | 2024 | Best Lyrics | Nominated | |
| Juno Award | 2024 | Single of the Year | Won | |
| MTV Video Music Awards | 2024 | Best Choreography | Nominated | |
| Nickelodeon Kids' Choice Awards | 2024 | Favorite Viral Song | Nominated | |
| People's Choice Awards | 2024 | Song of the Year | Nominated | |
| iHeartRadio Music Awards | 2025 | Song of the Year | Nominated | |
| iHeartRadio Music Awards | 2025 | Pop Song of the Year | Nominated | |
| BMI Pop Awards | 2025 | Most Performed Songs of the Year | Won | |

== Charts ==
=== Weekly charts ===
Weekly chart performance for "Greedy"
| Chart (2023–2024) | Peak position |
|---|---|
| Australia (ARIA) | 2 |
| Austria (Ö3 Austria Top 40) | 1 |
| Belarus Airplay (TopHit) | 2 |
| Belgium (Ultratop 50 Flanders) | 3 |
| Belgium (Ultratop 50 Wallonia) | 2 |
| Brazil Hot 100 (Billboard) | 44 |
| Bulgaria Airplay (PROPHON) | 1 |
| Canada Hot 100 (Billboard) | 1 |
| Canada AC (Billboard) | 11 |
| Canada CHR/Top 40 (Billboard) | 1 |
| Canada Hot AC (Billboard) | 1 |
| CIS Airplay (TopHit) | 1 |
| Croatia International Airplay (Top lista) | 2 |
| Czech Republic Airplay (ČNS IFPI) | 91 |
| Czech Republic Singles Digital (ČNS IFPI) | 3 |
| Denmark (Tracklisten) | 1 |
| Estonia Airplay (TopHit) | 1 |
| Finland (Suomen virallinen lista) | 11 |
| France (SNEP) | 6 |
| Germany (GfK) | 2 |
| Global 200 (Billboard) | 1 |
| Greece International (IFPI) | 1 |
| Hungary (Rádiós Top 40) | 1 |
| Hungary (Single Top 40) | 7 |
| Iceland (Tónlistinn) | 4 |
| India International (IMI) | 4 |
| Indonesia (Billboard) | 11 |
| Ireland (IRMA) | 2 |
| Israel (Mako Hitlist) | 29 |
| Italy (FIMI) | 40 |
| Japan Hot Overseas (Billboard Japan) | 10 |
| Kazakhstan Airplay (TopHit) | 4 |
| Latvia Airplay (LaIPA) | 1 |
| Latvia Streaming (LaIPA) | 2 |
| Lebanon (Lebanese Top 20) | 4 |
| Lithuania (AGATA) | 2 |
| Lithuania Airplay (TopHit) | 1 |
| Luxembourg (Billboard) | 1 |
| Malaysia (Billboard) | 1 |
| Malaysia International Streaming (RIM) | 1 |
| Middle East and North Africa (IFPI) | 2 |
| Moldova Airplay (TopHit) | 1 |
| Netherlands (Dutch Top 40) | 1 |
| Netherlands (Single Top 100) | 1 |
| New Zealand (Recorded Music NZ) | 2 |
| Nigeria (TurnTable Top 100) | 52 |
| Norway (VG-lista) | 1 |
| Panama International (PRODUCE) | 5 |
| Paraguay Airplay (Monitor Latino) | 8 |
| Philippines (Billboard) | 10 |
| Poland (Polish Airplay Top 100) | 3 |
| Poland (Polish Streaming Top 100) | 6 |
| Portugal (AFP) | 3 |
| Romania (Billboard) | 14 |
| Romania Airplay (Media Forest) | 1 |
| Romania TV Airplay (Media Forest) | 4 |
| Russia Airplay (TopHit) | 1 |
| San Marino Airplay (SMRTV Top 50) | 4 |
| Saudi Arabia (IFPI) | 3 |
| Singapore (RIAS) | 1 |
| Slovakia Airplay (ČNS IFPI) | 4 |
| Slovakia Singles Digital (ČNS IFPI) | 2 |
| South Africa (Billboard) | 19 |
| South Africa Airplay (TOSAC) | 6 |
| Spain (Promusicae) | 50 |
| Sweden (Sverigetopplistan) | 6 |
| Switzerland (Schweizer Hitparade) | 1 |
| Turkey International Airplay (Radiomonitor Türkiye) | 1 |
| Ukraine Airplay (TopHit) | 8 |
| United Arab Emirates (IFPI) | 1 |
| UK Singles (Official Charts) | 3 |
| US Billboard Hot 100 | 3 |
| US Adult Contemporary (Billboard) | 17 |
| US Adult Pop Airplay (Billboard) | 1 |
| US Dance Airplay (Billboard) | 6 |
| US Pop Airplay (Billboard) | 1 |
| Vietnam (Vietnam Hot 100) | 47 |

=== Monthly charts ===
Monthly chart performance for "Greedy"
| Chart (2023–2024) | Peak position |
|---|---|
| Belarus Airplay (TopHit) | 3 |
| Brazil Streaming (Pro-Música Brasil) | 49 |
| CIS Airplay (TopHit) | 1 |
| Czech Republic (Singles Digitál – Top 100) | 6 |
| Estonia Airplay (TopHit) | 3 |
| Kazakhstan Airplay (TopHit) | 4 |
| Latvia Airplay (TopHit) | 25 |
| Lithuania Airplay (TopHit) | 2 |
| Moldova Airplay (TopHit) | 1 |
| Paraguay (SGP) | 16 |
| Romania Airplay (TopHit) | 9 |
| Russia Airplay (TopHit) | 2 |
| Slovakia (Rádio – Top 100) | 10 |
| Slovakia (Singles Digitál – Top 100) | 2 |
| Ukraine Airplay (TopHit) | 16 |

=== Year-end charts ===
2023 year-end chart performance for "Greedy"
| Chart (2023) | Position |
|---|---|
| Australia (ARIA) | 49 |
| Austria (Ö3 Austria Top 40) | 36 |
| Belgium (Ultratop Flanders) | 71 |
| Belgium (Ultratop Wallonia) | 74 |
| CIS Airplay (TopHit) | 94 |
| Denmark (Tracklisten) | 55 |
| Estonia Airplay (TopHit) | 75 |
| France (SNEP) | 117 |
| Germany (GfK) | 53 |
| Hungary (Single Top 40) | 19 |
| Lithuania Airplay (TopHit) | 32 |
| Netherlands (Dutch Top 40) | 23 |
| Netherlands (Single Top 100) | 34 |
| Poland (Polish Airplay Top 100) | 77 |
| Poland (Polish Streaming Top 100) | 74 |
| Romania Airplay (TopHit) | 68 |
| Switzerland (Schweizer Hitparade) | 33 |
| UK Singles (OCC) | 74 |

2024 year-end chart performance for "Greedy"
| Chart (2024) | Position |
|---|---|
| Australia (ARIA) | 16 |
| Austria (Ö3 Austria Top 40) | 27 |
| Belarus Airplay (TopHit) | 11 |
| Belgium (Ultratop 50 Flanders) | 18 |
| Belgium (Ultratop 50 Wallonia) | 23 |
| Canada (Canadian Hot 100) | 7 |
| CIS Airplay (TopHit) | 11 |
| Denmark (Tracklisten) | 30 |
| Estonia Airplay (TopHit) | 32 |
| France (SNEP) Remixes | 53 |
| Germany (GfK) | 11 |
| Global 200 (Billboard) | 5 |
| Global Singles (IFPI) | 18 |
| Hungary (Rádiós Top 40) | 66 |
| Hungary (Single Top 40) | 79 |
| Iceland (Tónlistinn) | 14 |
| Kazakhstan Airplay (TopHit) | 55 |
| Moldova Airplay (TopHit) | 1 |
| Netherlands (Dutch Top 40) | 54 |
| Netherlands (Single Top 100) | 34 |
| New Zealand (Recorded Music NZ) | 21 |
| Philippines (Philippines Hot 100) | 96 |
| Poland (Polish Airplay Top 100) | 78 |
| Poland (Polish Streaming Top 100) | 50 |
| Portugal (AFP) | 29 |
| Russia Airplay (TopHit) | 60 |
| Switzerland (Schweizer Hitparade) | 17 |
| UK Singles (OCC) | 18 |
| US Billboard Hot 100 | 13 |
| US Adult Contemporary (Billboard) | 35 |
| US Adult Top 40 (Billboard) | 5 |
| US Dance/Mix Show Airplay (Billboard) | 7 |
| US Pop Airplay (Billboard) | 1 |

2025 year-end chart performance for "Greedy"
| Chart (2025) | Position |
|---|---|
| Australia (ARIA) | 89 |
| Belarus Airplay (TopHit) | 91 |
| Belgium (Ultratop 50 Flanders) | 109 |
| Estonia Airplay (TopHit) | 160 |
| Global 200 (Billboard) | 77 |
| Hungary (Rádiós Top 40) | 98 |
| Moldova Airplay (TopHit) | 32 |

== Certifications ==
Certifications for "Greedy"
| Region | Certification | Certified units/sales |
|---|---|---|
| Australia (ARIA) | 6× Platinum | 420,000^{‡} |
| Austria (IFPI Austria) | 3× Platinum | 90,000^{‡} |
| Belgium (BRMA) | 2× Platinum | 80,000^{‡} |
| Brazil (Pro-Música Brasil) | 3× Diamond | 480,000^{‡} |
| Canada (Music Canada) | 8× Platinum | 640,000^{‡} |
| Denmark (IFPI Danmark) | 2× Platinum | 180,000^{‡} |
| France (SNEP) | Diamond | 333,333^{‡} |
| Germany (BVMI) | 3× Gold | 900,000^{‡} |
| Hungary (MAHASZ) | 7× Platinum | 28,000^{‡} |
| Italy (FIMI) | Platinum | 100,000^{‡} |
| Mexico (AMPROFON) | Platinum+Gold | 210,000^{‡} |
| New Zealand (RMNZ) | 5× Platinum | 150,000^{‡} |
| Poland (ZPAV) | 4× Platinum | 200,000^{‡} |
| Portugal (AFP) | 4× Platinum | 40,000^{‡} |
| Spain (Promusicae) | 2× Platinum | 120,000^{‡} |
| Switzerland (IFPI Switzerland) | Platinum | 30,000^{‡} |
| United Kingdom (BPI) | 3× Platinum | 1,800,000^{‡} |
| United States (RIAA) | 5× Platinum | 5,000,000^{‡} |
Streaming
| Greece (IFPI Greece) | 4× Platinum | 8,000,000^{†} |
| Sweden (GLF) | Platinum | 12,000,000^{†} |
^{‡} Sales+streaming figures based on certification alone.^{†} Streaming-only figures based on certification alone.

== Release history ==
Release dates and formats for "Greedy"
| Region | Date | Format(s) | Version | Label | Ref. |
|---|---|---|---|---|---|
| Various | September 15, 2023 | Digital download; streaming | Original; sped up; slowed down | RCA | |
| United States | September 18, 2023 | Hot adult contemporary radio | Original | RCA | |
| United States | September 19, 2023 | Contemporary hit radio | Original | RCA | |
| Italy | September 22, 2023 | Radio airplay | Original | Sony | |
| Various | October 27, 2023 | Digital download; streaming | Remixes | RCA | |
