= Exes (song) =

- Regard remix cover

Single by Tate McRae

from the album Think Later
- Released: November 17, 2023
- Genre: Pop; R&B; trap
- Length: 2:39
- Label: RCA
- Songwriters: Tate McRae; Ryan Tedder; Tyler Spry
- Producers: Ryan Tedder; Tyler Spry

Tate McRae singles chronology
"Greedy" (2023)	"Exes" (2023)	"It's OK I'm OK" (2024)

Music video
- "Exes" on YouTube

"Exes" is a song by Canadian singer-songwriter Tate McRae, from her second studio album, Think Later (2023). It was released on November 17, 2023, through RCA Records as the second and final single from the album. The song reached the top 10 in Canada, as well as number 23 on the Billboard Global 200 chart. It is certified Gold or higher in eleven countries.

== Background and composition ==
"Exes" was the last song written for Think Later. While McRae was creating the track list for the album with Ryan Tedder, he suggested that they write a song together with Spry in 30 minutes. The result of their session was "Exes", which was "fully produced and vocal tracked" in 90 minutes. The song was then selected as the next single from the album. McRae described the process as "the most Think Later thing we could ever have done". "Exes" has been described as a pop, R&B, and trap song.

== Promotion ==
On November 14, 2023, McRae confirmed the release of "Exes" on her Instagram and TikTok. The announcement post on Instagram was captioned with the lyric "kisses to my xx", while she had previously teased the song in a TikTok video a few days prior.

McRae performed "Exes" on the December 12, 2023, episode of The Tonight Show Starring Jimmy Fallon. She also included "Exes" in her sets at the 2023 edition of the Jingle Bell Ball and the 2024 edition of the NHL All-Star Game.

== Music video ==
The music video was filmed seven days after the song was written. It was directed by Aerin Moreno and choreographed by Sean Bankhead. Inspired by artists such as Britney Spears and Christina Aguilera, McRae wanted choreography to have a prominent role in the video. It shows her dancing with a group of female backup dancers in a run-down rodeo. McRae revealed in an interview with W that during the video shoot, she had an allergic reaction because of the usage of hay stacks used in the background.

== Accolades ==
Awards and nominations for "Exes"
Organization	Year	Category	Result	Ref.
Juno Award	2025	Single of the Year	Won	

== Charts ==
=== Weekly charts ===
Weekly chart performance for "Exes"
Chart (2023–2024)	Peak position
Australia (ARIA)	15
Austria (Ö3 Austria Top 40)	33
Belgium (Ultratop 50 Flanders)	35
Canada Hot 100 (Billboard)	9
Canada CHR/Top 40 (Billboard)	4
Canada Hot AC (Billboard)	23
Czech Republic Singles Digital (ČNS IFPI)	40
Denmark (Tracklisten)	32
Finland (Suomen virallinen lista)	43
France (SNEP)	195
Germany (GfK)	54
Global 200 (Billboard)	23
Greece International (IFPI)	16
Hungary (Single Top 40)	37
Ireland (IRMA)	11
Latvia Airplay (LaIPA)	20
Lithuania (AGATA)	40
Netherlands (Dutch Top 40)	19
Netherlands (Single Top 100)	26
New Zealand (Recorded Music NZ)	14
Nigeria (TurnTable Top 100)	91
Norway (VG-lista)	12
Poland (Polish Streaming Top 100)	81
Portugal (AFP)	49
Singapore (RIAS)	21
Slovakia Airplay (ČNS IFPI)	47
Slovakia Singles Digital (ČNS IFPI)	70
South Africa (TOSAC)	55
Sweden (Sverigetopplistan)	27
Switzerland (Schweizer Hitparade)	27
UK Singles (OCC)	12
US Billboard Hot 100	34
US Adult Pop Airplay (Billboard)	30
US Dance/Mix Show Airplay (Billboard)	18
US Pop Airplay (Billboard)	10

=== Year-end charts ===
Year-end chart performance for "Exes"
Chart (2024)	Position
Australia (ARIA)	59
Canada (Canadian Hot 100)	47
Global 200 (Billboard)	173
US Billboard Hot 100	93
US Mainstream Top 40 (Billboard)	33

== Certifications ==
Certifications for "Exes"
Region	Certification	Certified units/sales
Australia (ARIA)	2× Platinum	140,000^{‡}
Austria (IFPI Austria)	Gold	15,000^{‡}
Belgium (BRMA)	Gold	20,000^{‡}
Brazil (Pro-Música Brasil)	Platinum	40,000^{‡}
Canada (Music Canada)	4× Platinum	320,000^{‡}
Denmark (IFPI Danmark)	Platinum	90,000^{‡}
France (SNEP)	Gold	100,000^{‡}
New Zealand (RMNZ)	2× Platinum	60,000^{‡}
Poland (ZPAV)	Gold	25,000^{‡}
Spain (Promusicae)	Gold	30,000^{‡}
Switzerland (IFPI Switzerland)	Gold	15,000^{‡}
United Kingdom (BPI)	Platinum	600,000^{‡}
United States (RIAA)	3× Platinum	3,000,000^{‡}
^{‡} Sales+streaming figures based on certification alone.

== Release history ==
Release dates and formats for "Exes"
Region	Date	Format	Version	Label	Ref.
Various	November 17, 2023	Digital download; streaming	Original	RCA	
United States	November 28, 2023	Contemporary hit radio	Original	RCA	
Various	February 2, 2024	Digital download; streaming	Regard remix	RCA	
Italy	March 1, 2024	Radio airplay	Original	Sony Italy	
Various	March 8, 2024	Digital download; streaming	Syn Cole remix	RCA	
