= A.R. (EP) =

EP by Aisha Retno
- Released: November 24, 2023
- Recorded: 2022–2023
- Genre: Pop
- Length: 20:38
- Labels: Faithful Music; Sony Music Malaysia
- Producers: Glowrush; Romeo; Sharon Paul; MFMF

Aisha Retno chronology
A.R. (2023)	Re.Hab (2025)

Singles from A.R.
- 1. "Sutera" Released: 29 July 2022; 2. "Jarak" Released: 24 February 2023; 3. "Ternoktah" Released: 22 September 2023

A.R. is the debut extended play (EP) by Malaysian singer, Aisha Retno, released on 24 November 2023 by Faithful Music and Sony Music Malaysia.

== Background ==
The EP was the official album release from Aisha Retno since she began her music career in 2018 and was named after her initials. Aisha spent 2022 and 2023 to recorded tracks in the EP and collaborated with Firdaus Rahmat, Iqie Hugh and Hanis Rafi. She said about the EP in an interview with Kosmo!: The album (EP) name is A.R. which tells the story of my life throughout my time in this industry, in addition to the love story. [It] has about five songs and I am following the target of all the songs appearing in turn from September until November".

In the EP, there is a song titled "Teduh", written by Aisha herself with Iqie Hugh and John Jeeves, which was specially dedicated to her mother, an Indonesian veteran singer Jean Retno Aryani. The EP was released on 24 November 2023 to commercial success and receive any critical praise upon its release.

== Singles ==
The first single to be released from the EP was "Sutera" on 29 July 2022. Produced by MFMF, the song, according to Aisha, is "the symbol of a Javanese queen" and combines both Javanese and electronic dance music (EDM). "Jarak", featuring Bruneian singer Aziz Harun, was released as the EP's second single on 24 February 2023. It went on become her first duet single and was later included in Aziz's debut album, Yang Benar.

"Ternoktah" was released as the third single from A.R. on 22 September 2023, followed by two further singles "Cukuplah" and "Teduh" on 31 December.

== Track listing ==
No.	Title	Writer(s)	Length
1.	"Pencarianku"	Aisha Retno, Sharon Paul	3:58
2.	"Jarak" (feat. Aziz Harun)	Aisha Retno, Glowrush, Romeo	2:43
3.	"Ternoktah"	Aisha Retno, Firdaus Rahmat, Hanis Rafi	3:51
4.	"Teduh"	Aisha Retno, Iqie Hugh, John Jeeves	3:12
5.	"Cukuplah"	Aisha Retno, Firdaus Rahmat, John Jeeves	3:34
6.	"Sutera"	Aisha Retno, MFMF	3:18
Total length:			20:38

== Release history ==
Release history
Region	Date	Format(s)	Label	Ref.
Malaysia	24 November 2023	CD; music download; streaming	Faithful Music, Sony Music Malaysia	
