= Princess Ameerah =

Princess Ameerah may refer to:

- Princess Ameerah of Brunei (born 2008), Bruneian princess
- Ameera al-Taweel (born 1983), former Saudi princess
