= Yuka Kharisma =

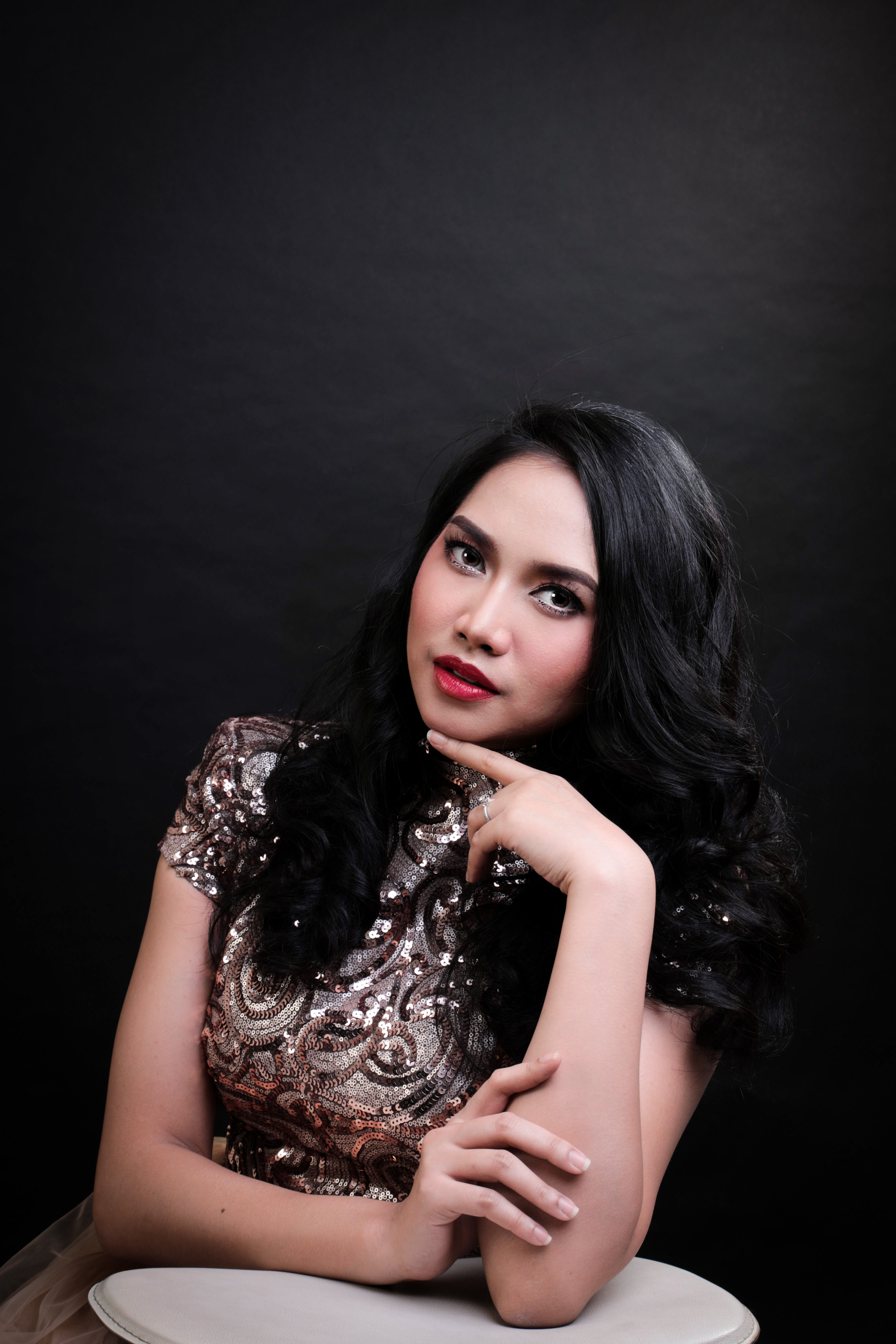

Background information
- Also known as: Yuka
- Born: Yuka Kharisma; October 15, 1987 (age 38); Lhokseumawe, Aceh, Indonesia
- Genres: Pop; R&B; Jazz; Soul
- Occupations: Singer; Songwriter; Composer; Lyricist; Concert Organiser
- Instruments: Vocal; Piano
- Years active: 2008–present
- Labels: Kharisma Entertainment & Rocketfuel Entertainment
- Website: http://www.yuka.com.my

Yuka Kharisma is an Indonesian singer-songwriter based in Kuala Lumpur, Malaysia.

She was a semi-finalist of the fifth season of Indonesian Idol. In 2016, she won the Best New Female Artist Award of the 15th Anugerah Planet Muzik. In year 2018, Yuka Kharisma launched her first album called YUKA #1 and it is world premiered on her Concert on April 28 along with Bunga Citra Lestari (BCL) and Anuar Zain at Plenary Hall KLCC, Kuala Lumpur, Malaysia.

In 2021, Yuka made a comeback with a new song called Melihatmu Bahagia, which is composed and song writing by herself.

She will become supporting actress in her filmography debut, The Experts directed by Andre Chiew and Nazim Shah.

== Personal life ==
Yuka has been married to her husband Ahmad Jeffny since May 2016.

== Discography ==
=== Album ===
Year	Album	Track listing	Notes
2018	YUKA #1	"Baby Santai"; "Mati Rasa"; "Jatuh Cinta"; "Teman Baik Saja"; "Pulang"	

=== Singles ===
Year Year	Single	Album	Notes
2006	"Khayal"	Non-album single	
2014	"Dengan Tiada Luka"	Non-album single	
2015	"Ku Bersedia"	Non-album single	OST film Girlfriend Kontrak
2015	"Hati Berbisik"	Non-album single	OST film Love, Supermoon
2021	"Melihatmu Bahagia"	Non-album single	
2021	"Tentang Rasa"	Non-album single	
2024	"Cinta Indah Buat Kanda"	Non-album single	OST film The Experts

=== As featured artist ===
Year	Title	Notes
2020	"Off Day" (Altimet featuring Yuka Kharisma)	Non-album single
2020	"Terima Kasih" (Aisha Retno featuring Yuka Kharisma)	Non-album single

=== Other songs ===
Year	Title	Notes	Ref.
2021	"NOIR NOIR NOIR"	song for Noir Health & Beauty	
2021	"OBSESS"	song for Obsess Cosmetics	
2021	"Lebaran Tetap Tiba"	song for Eid al-Fitr, with Ernie Zakri, Syamel, Sufi Rashid, Amira Othman, Irfan Haris & Timah	

== Filmography ==
=== Film ===
Year	Title	Character	Notes
2024	The Experts	Jazz Singer	Filmography debut, also performed OST titled "Cinta Indah Buat Kanda"
