= Prince Abdul Wakeel of Brunei =

Bruneian prince (born 2006)

Abdul Wakeel: عبد الوکيل
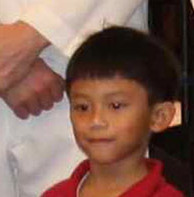
- Abdul Wakeel in 2011
- Born: Abdul Wakeel ibni Hassanal Bolkiah; 1 June 2006 (age 20); Bandar Seri Begawan, Brunei
- House: Bolkiah
- Father: Hassanal Bolkiah
- Mother: Azrinaz Mazhar Hakim
- Religion: Sunni Islam

Abdul Wakeel ibni Hassanal Bolkiah (Jawi: عبد الوکيل; born 1 June 2006) is a member of the royal family of Brunei. He is the son of Sultan Hassanal Bolkiah by his former third wife, Azrinaz Mazhar Hakim, and is sixth in the line of succession to the Bruneian throne.

== Early life ==
Prince Wakeel was born on 1 June 2006 to Sultan Hassanal Bolkiah and his third wife, Azrinaz Mazhar Hakim. His parents divorced in 2010 and his father received full custody. He has one younger sister, Princess Ameerah Wardatul, along with ten half siblings from his father's first two marriages and two half siblings from his mother's second marriage.

== Education ==
In May 2025, Prince Wakeel graduated from Jerudong International School with a BTEC International Level 3 Extended Diploma. He earned grades of DDM which is equivalent to AAC grades at A-level and 128 UCAS points.

== Royal duties ==
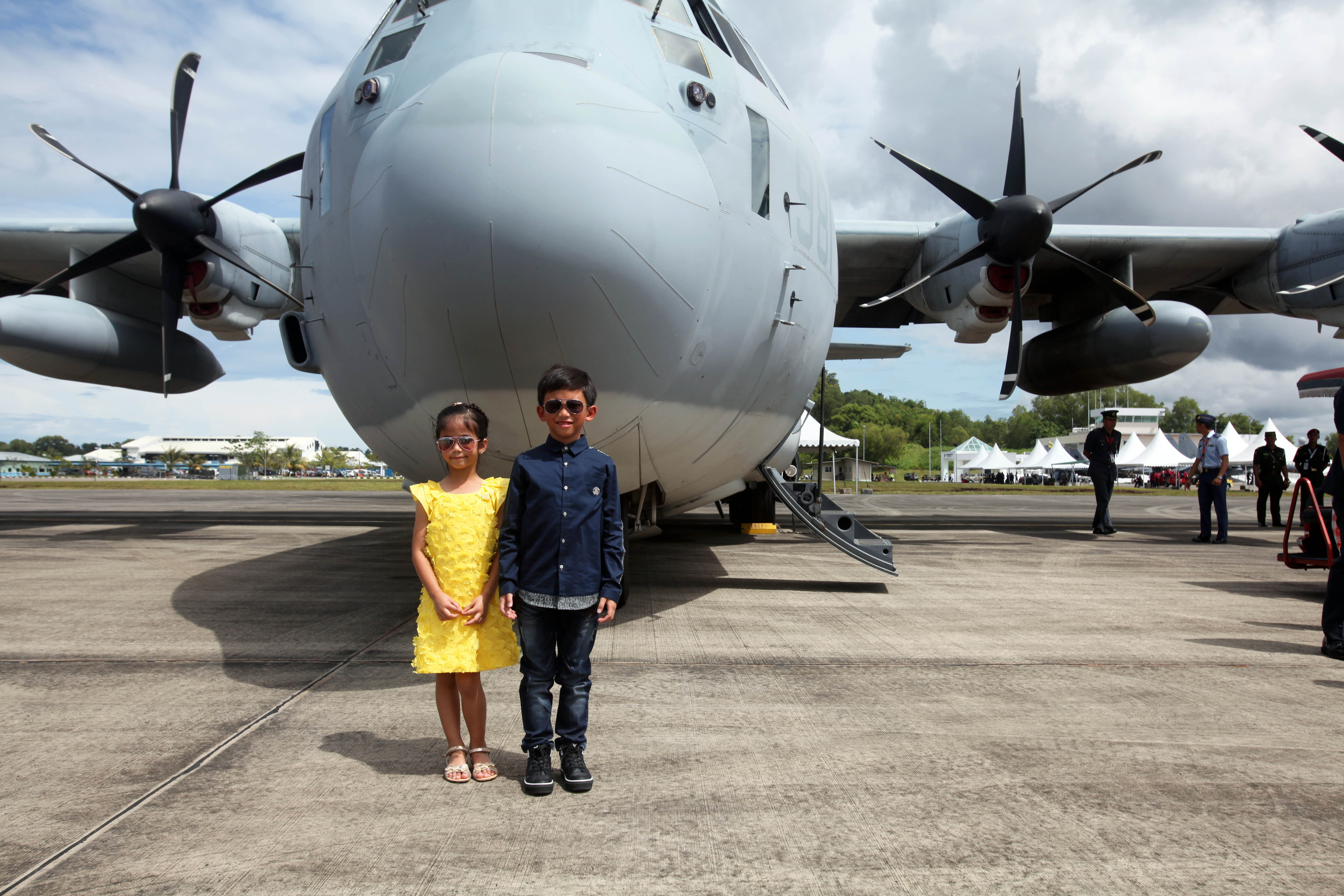
Princess Ameerah and Prince Wakeel in front of a KC-130J Super Hercules at BRIDEX in 2013

As a member of the royal family, Prince Wakeel participates in incoming state visits to Brunei, investiture ceremonies, and National Day celebrations.

With his sister, Princess Ameerah, he visited the Brunei Darussalam International Defence Exhibition in December 2013, opened a new area of Jerudong Park in July 2017, and attended the closing gala of the 5th ASEAN Children's Forum in August 2018.

In April 2023, he presented Kurnia Peribadi personal gifts on behalf of his father in Temburong. On 16 May 2024, Sultan Hassanal Bolkiah appointed Prince Wakeel to the Privy Council.

== Titles, styles, and honours ==
=== Title and style ===
His full title and style is Duli Yang Teramat Mulia Paduka Seri Pengiran Muda 'Abdul Wakeel ibni Kebawah Duli Yang Maha Mulia Paduka Seri Baginda Sultan Haji Hassanal Bolkiah Mu'izzaddin Waddaulah It is usually translated in English as His Royal Highness Prince Abdul Wakeel of Brunei.

=== Honours ===
==== National ====
- Order of the Crown of Brunei (DKMB)
- Sultan Hassanal Bolkiah Medal (PHBS)
- National Day Silver Jubilee Medal (23 February 2009)
- Sultan of Brunei Golden Jubilee Medal (5 October 2017)

==== Foreign ====
- Malaysia
  - Perak
    - Recipient of the Sultan Nazrin Shah Installation Medal

Prince Abdul Wakeel of Brunei House of Bolkiah Born: 1 June 2006
Preceded by Abdul Mateen	Succession to the Bruneian throne 6th position	Succeeded by Mohamed Bolkiah
