= Jerudong International School =

International school in Brunei

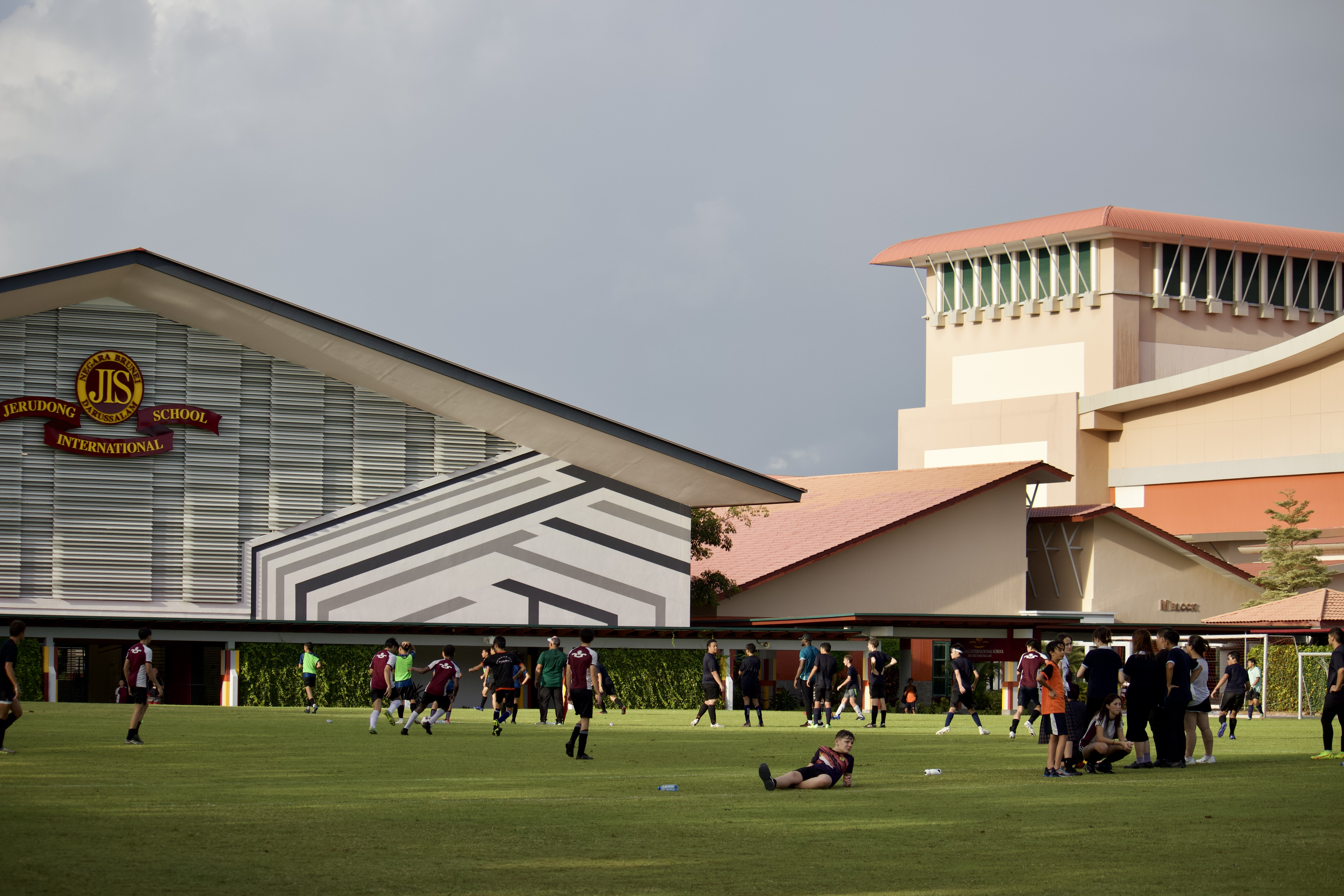
- Jerudong International School in 2022

Location
- Jalan Universiti; Kampong Tungku, BE2119; Brunei; 4.969139°N 114.880444°E

Information
- Other name: JIS
- Type: Private International school
- Motto: Achieving Excellence
- Established: 1997
- Principal: Nicholas Sheehan
- Staff: 180 full-time
- Gender: Coeducational
- Age: 2 to 18
- Enrolment: 1,700
- Hours in school day: 8
- Houses: Senior School: 16; Junior School: 4
- Colours: Maroon, navy and gold
- Affiliations: FOBISIA, HMC, BSA, COBIS, CIE, AQA, Edexcel, IB
- Website: jerudonginternationalschool.com

Jerudong International School (Malay: Sekolah Antarabangsa Jerudong; Abbrev: JIS) is a co-educational, boarding and day school in Brunei, Southeast Asia. It has around 1700 students - of which around 200 are boarding students. With a diverse student body from over 45 countries, Jerudong International School first opened its doors for primary education in January 1997 and subsequently for secondary in October of the same year. JIS offers a British International education.

For the Junior School, services are offered from nursery to Year 6. The Senior School offers the Middle Years Programme in Years 7, 8 and 9; the IGCSE in Years 10 and 11. In the Pre-university programme - Years 12 and 13, there are three pathways which are A Level examination, IB Diploma or BTEC International Level 3 Extended Diploma in Creative Media.

The school is affiliated to several British international school organisations such as the Federation of British International Schools in Asia (FOBISIA) Headmasters' and Headmistresses' Conference (HMC), the and the Boarding Schools' Association (BSA). JIS is rated as the most prestigious school in Brunei by the Good School Guide.

== Accreditation ==
The school is listed in the Spear’s Schools Index as one of the world’s top 100 private schools, and in the top 15 for the Asia-Pacific region.

In February 2023, JIS was honoured with the COBIS Patron's Accreditation and became the first international school worldwide to receive Beacon Status in three standards: Student Welfare, Boarding Provision and Extracurricular, Enrichment & Engagement.

The school was the first international school in the world to achieve 'Outstanding', the highest level possible, in all nine inspection areas.

JIS is also an accredited IB World School and offers the IB Diploma as a sixth form/pre-university option. The School offers IGCSEs and A Levels from the Cambridge Assessment International Examination Board, Edexcel and AQA Examination Boards.

== Location ==
Jerudong International School sits on around 120 acres (49 ha) of private ground in Kampong Tungku. Subjects are taught at various blocks throughout the school. Uniquely, it also has its own forest trail which leads to the beach.

== Year groups ==
Jerudong International School provides comprehensive education from nursery to year 13 following a British International National Curriculum. The School is divided into the Junior School (Nursery, Kindergarten, Reception and Years 1–6) and Senior School Middle Years: Years 7-9 and Upper Years: the 2 year IGCSE course for Years 10 & 11; and, in Years 12 and 13, a pre-university pathway.

=== Junior School ===
The early years of the Junior School consist of nursery, kindergarten and reception. The school follows the UK Early Years Foundation Programme for these years. Junior years are Years 1 to 6. The Junior School is usually attended by pupils from age two in nursery to age eleven in Year 6.

=== Senior School ===
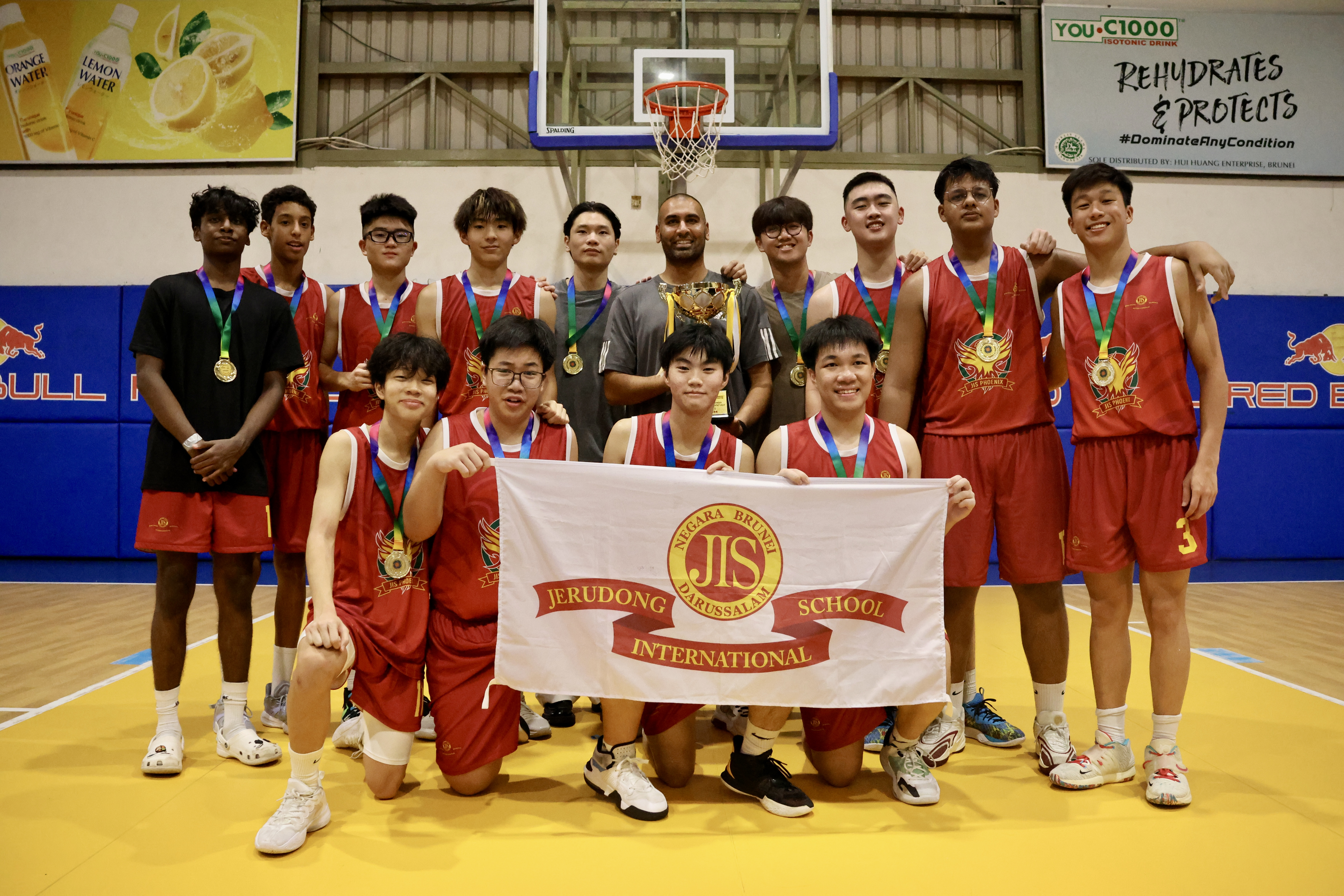
JIS Senior School basketball team

The Senior School consists of middle years (Years 7 to 9) and Upper Years where students are studying for the IGCSE, and later, the A Level, IB Diploma programme or the BTEC International Level 3 Extended Diploma in Creative Media (Years 10 to 13).

The middle years are the first three years of the Senior School and help students to transition from Junior School and prepare for the Upper Years.

Students in Years 10 and 11, the first two years of the upper years, study for a two-year programme: the GCSE or the IGCSE offered by Cambridge International Examinations (CIE) and Edexcel.

Years 12 and 13 form a pre-university pathway. Students choose to study either the A-Level Examinations, the International Baccalaureate (IB) Diploma Programme or the BTEC International Level 3 Extended Diploma in Creative Media. JIS has a particular focus on preparing students for admissions for UK, USA, Australia and Canadian universities.

Academic years in Jerudong International School
School	Year Group	Year
Junior School	Early Years	Nursery
Junior School	Early Years	Kindergarten
Junior School	Early Years	Reception
Junior School	Junior Years	Years 1 - 6
Senior School	Middle Years	Years 7 - 9
Senior School	Upper Years	Years 10 & 11 (IGCSE)
Senior School	Upper Years	Years 12 & 13 (A Level or IB Diploma or BTEC)

== Boarding ==
Jerudong International School offers boarding for over 200 Boarding students from 11 years of age. Students can be either weekly boarders or full term boarders. Boarders are allocated to one of the four boarding houses run by teachers from the school. The boys houses are Eagle House and Ibis House. Kingfisher House and Osprey House are for the girls. All Boarding Houses cater students of Years 7 above. All Houses are safely located within the extensive 120-acre (49 ha) school campus.

== Campus ==
The school compound is a single site area of 120 acres (49 ha). Jerudong International School is known to have facilities for various academic and non-academic uses.

=== Sports Complex ===
The Sports Complex opened in January 2017 and is situated in the area between the main school buildings and boarding houses. It has two indoor multi-purpose courts, one 8 lane, 25m indoor swimming pool and fitness room. There are also grounds for outdoor sports such as football and rugby, as well as another swimming pool of 50m in length with four lanes.

=== Arts Centre ===
The Jerudong International School Arts Centre is a multi-purpose complex dedicated to the performing arts which was opened in October 2011. The Arts Centre comprises a theatre, which can accommodate up to 725 guests on normal seating, a Black Box Theatre, an Art Gallery, a Conference Room, Orchestra Rehearsal Room, spaces for exhibition, dance studio, recording studio and several bespoke drama classrooms. The JIS Arts Centre has also become the venue for Toyota Classics Orchestra in Brunei since 2012. In 2017, the Earl and Countess of Wessex visited the school and Arts Centre.

=== Outdoor Discovery Centre (ODC) ===
In July 2022, JIS received the Global Eco-Schools Green Flag Award for its Outdoor Discovery Centre (ODC), a 10,000 m^{2} area on the school campus that is being reforested. The ODC is used as an outdoor learning space for student-led projects, including rewilding, fruit and vegetable gardens, maintenance of stingless-bee hives, rainwater harvesting, and eco-art.

=== Solar PV Project ===
In June 2024, JIS unveiled its Solar PV Project, becoming Brunei's first school to undertake a major solar installation and integrate a comprehensive solar energy system. The school has installed over 600 solar panels, estimated to produce nearly 600,000 KWh of energy annually. This initiative aims to significantly reduce the carbon footprint and promote renewable energy usage within the JIS campus community.

=== JIS Orchestra ===
The JIS orchestra is one of the few orchestras in Brunei and has performed for international dignitaries such as Crown Prince Al-Muhtadee Billah, Prince Charles of Wales and Camilla, Duchess of Cornwall. As an expression of appreciation after a private concert, Prince Al-Muhtadee Billah gave the JIS Orchestra the Brunei model of the Fazioli concert grand piano which was produced with inlays of precious stones, mother of pearl and exotic woods.

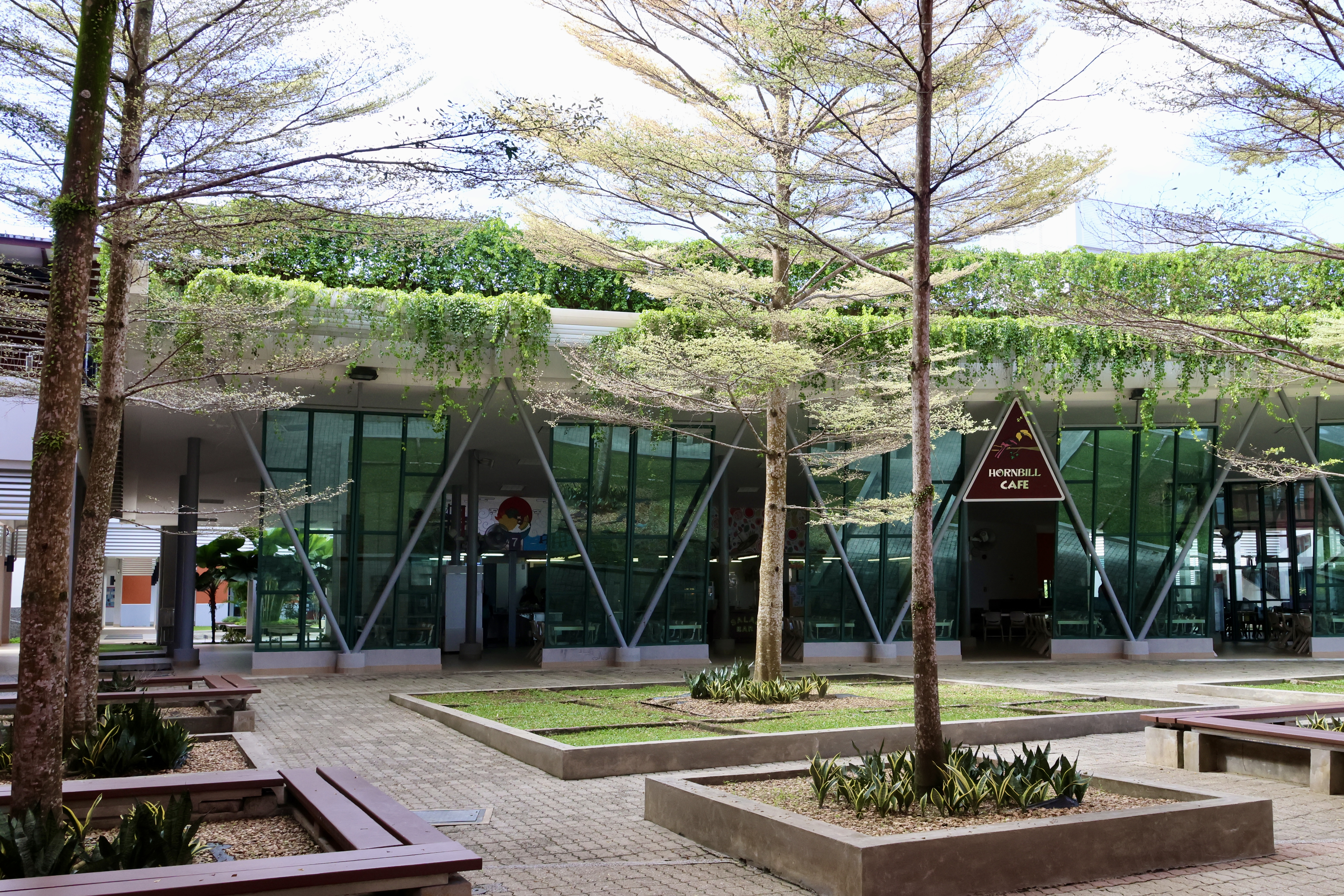
Hornbill Café

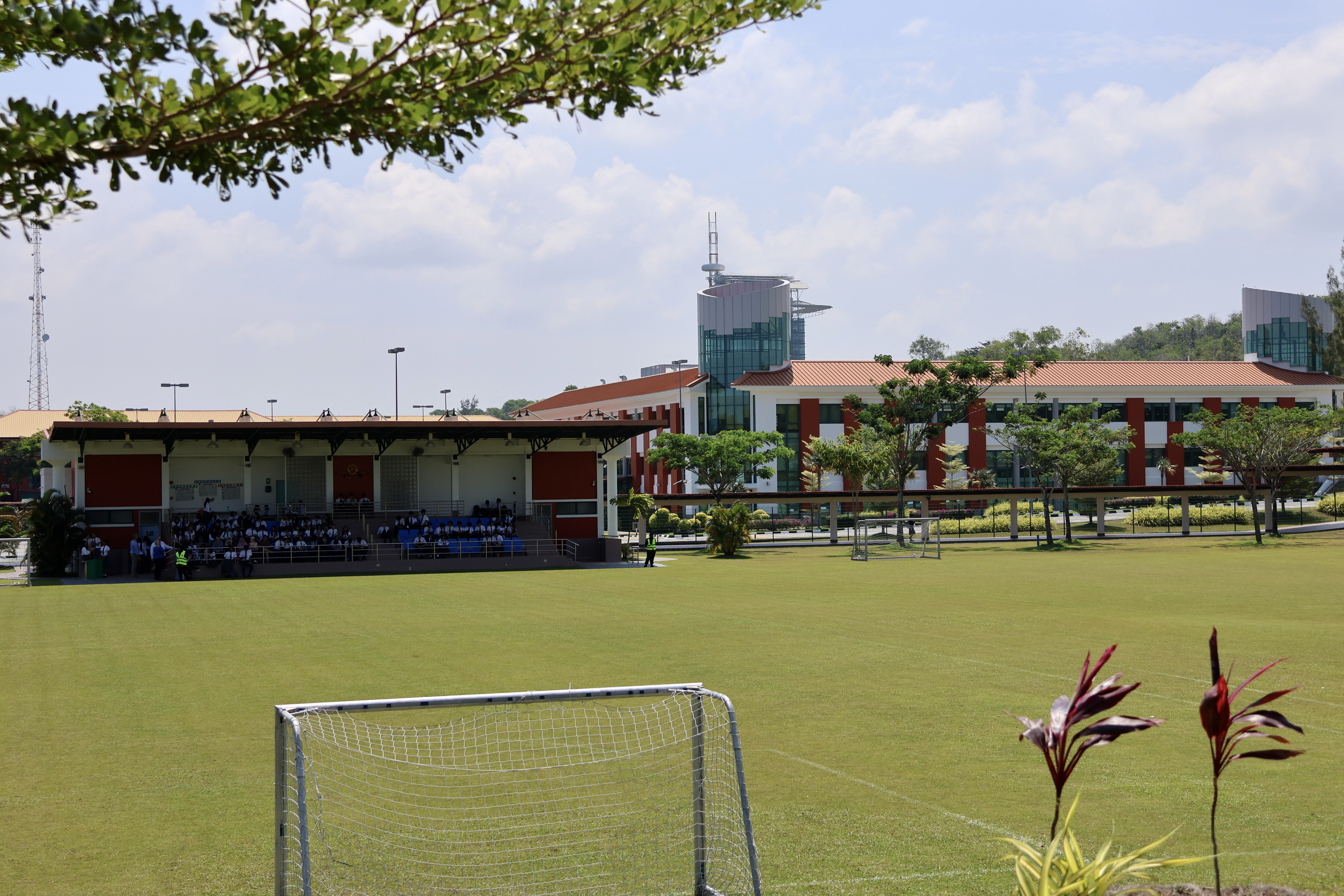
V Block field

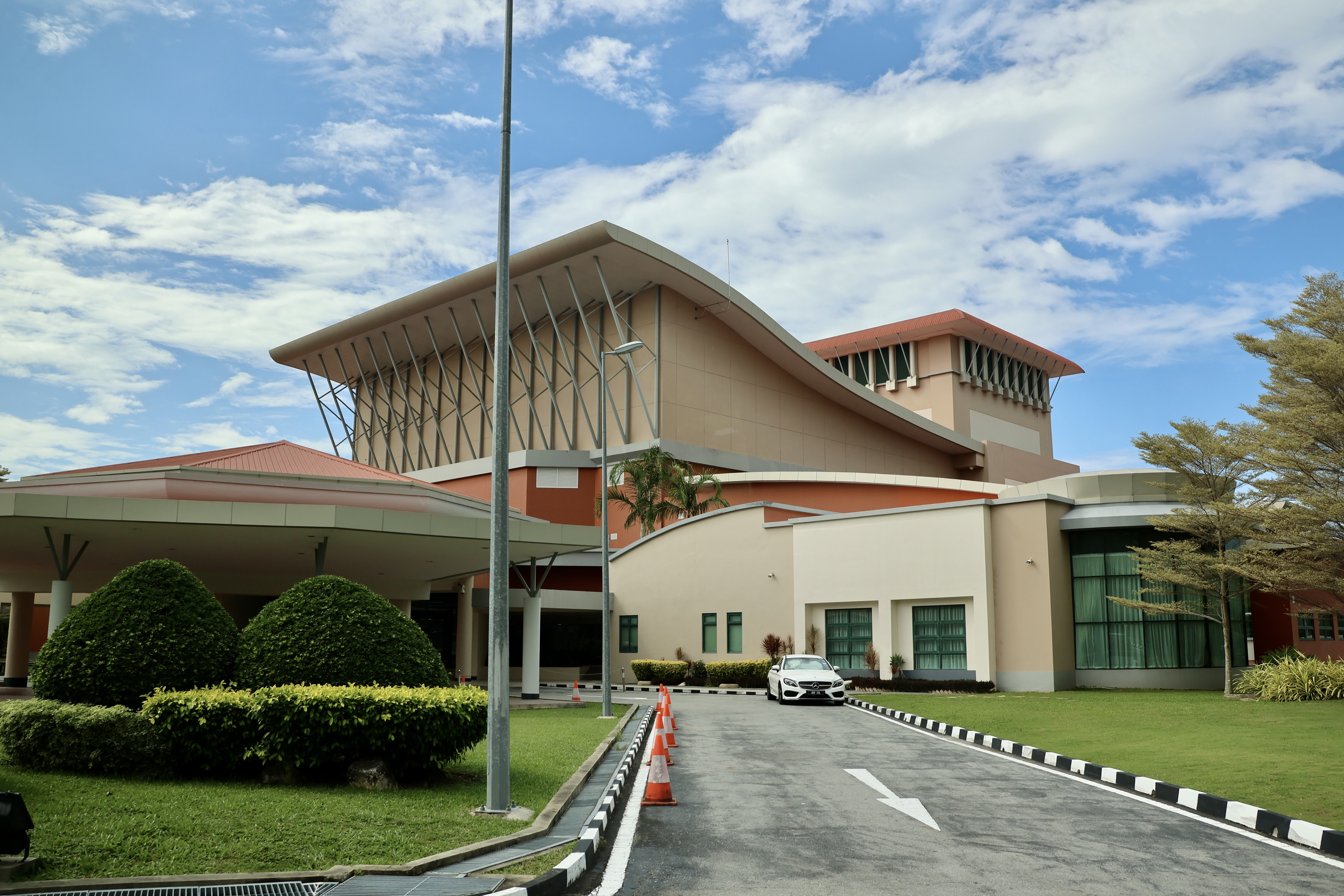
Arts Centre

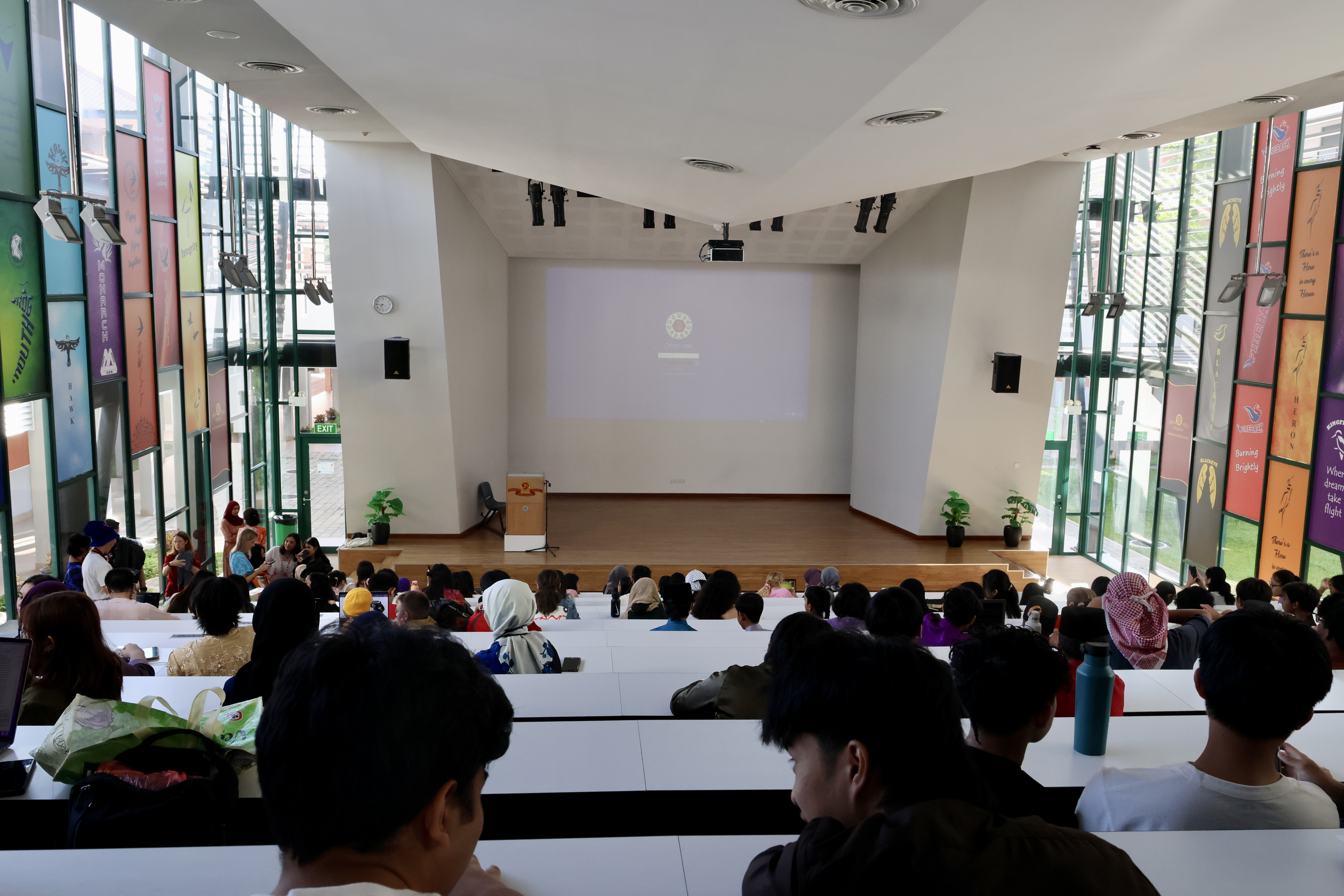
Lecture Theatre

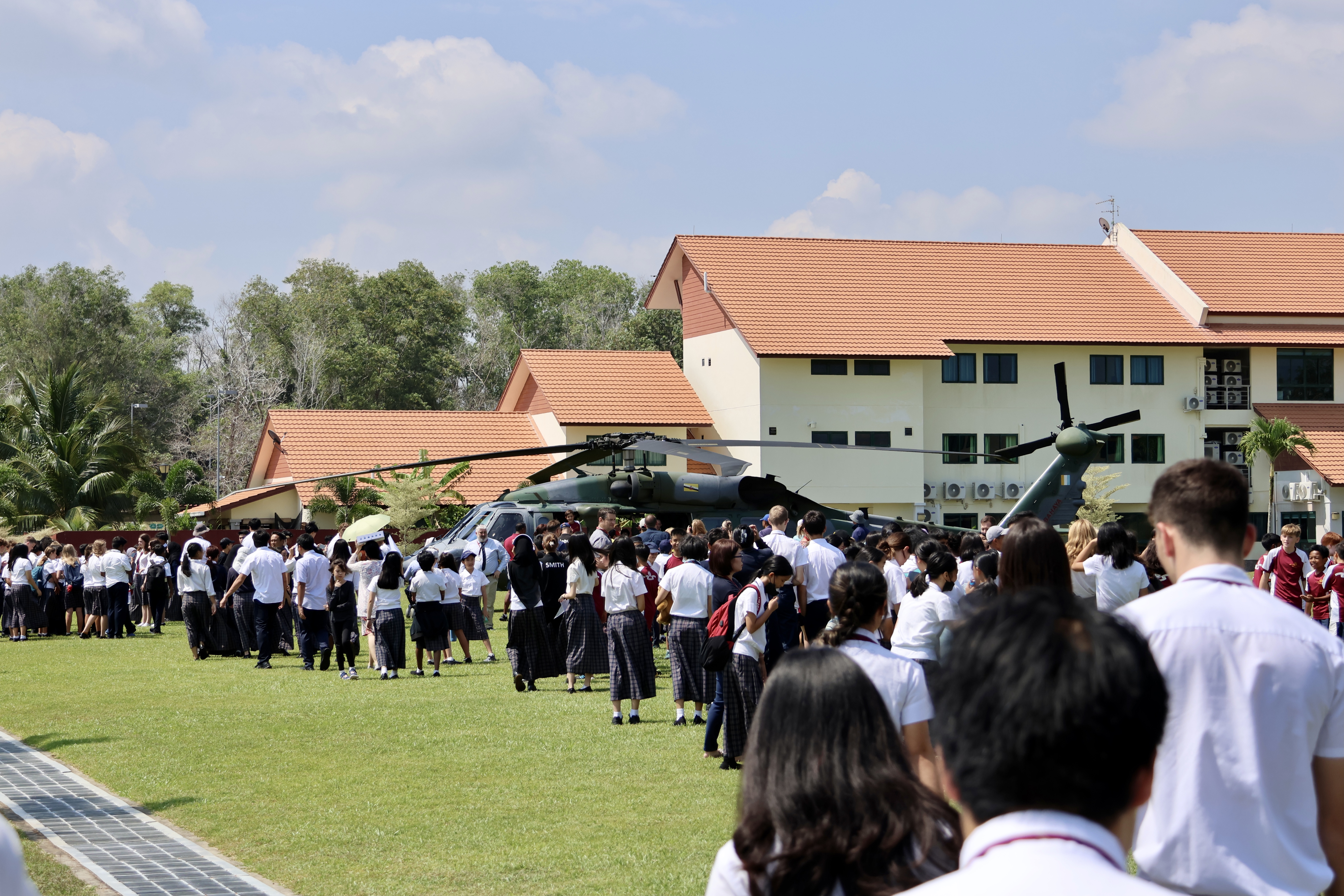
Eagle House

== Affiliation ==
Jerudong International School is a member of several British school organisations, namely the Headmasters' and Headmistresses' Conference (HMC), the Federation of British International Schools in Asia (FOBISIA), the Council of British International Schools (COBIS) and the Boarding Schools Association (BSA).

The GCSE, IGCSE and A Level qualifications are based on AQA, Cambridge International Examinations (CIE) and Edexcel. Jerudong International School is also an IB World School and has offered the IB Diploma Programme since 8 April 2011.

== Notable alumni ==
- Zeke Chan, Olympian swimmer
- Aziz Harun, singer and actor
- Maria Grace Koh, singer-songwriter and swimmer
- Anisha Rosnah
- Basma Lachkar, wushu athlete
- Anderson Lim, Olympian swimmer
- Zachary Payne, Olympian swimmer
- Prince Abdul Malik
- Prince Abdul Mateen
- Prince Abdul Wakeel
- Princess Ameerah Wardatul
- Princess Rashidah Sa'adatul
- Phil Wang, stand-up comedian
- Joshua Yong, Olympian swimmer
Notable Jerudong International School Alumni

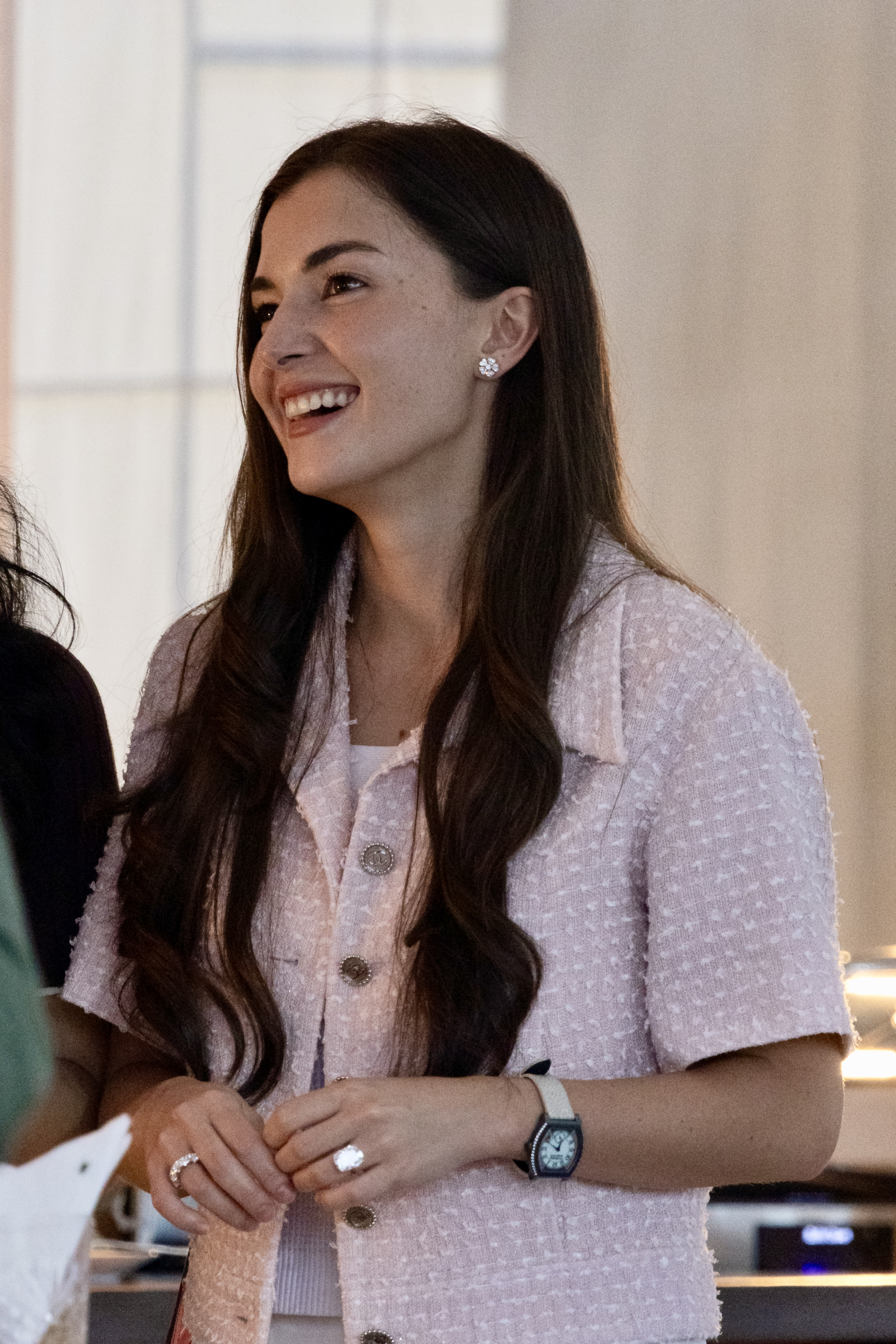
Anisha Rosnah

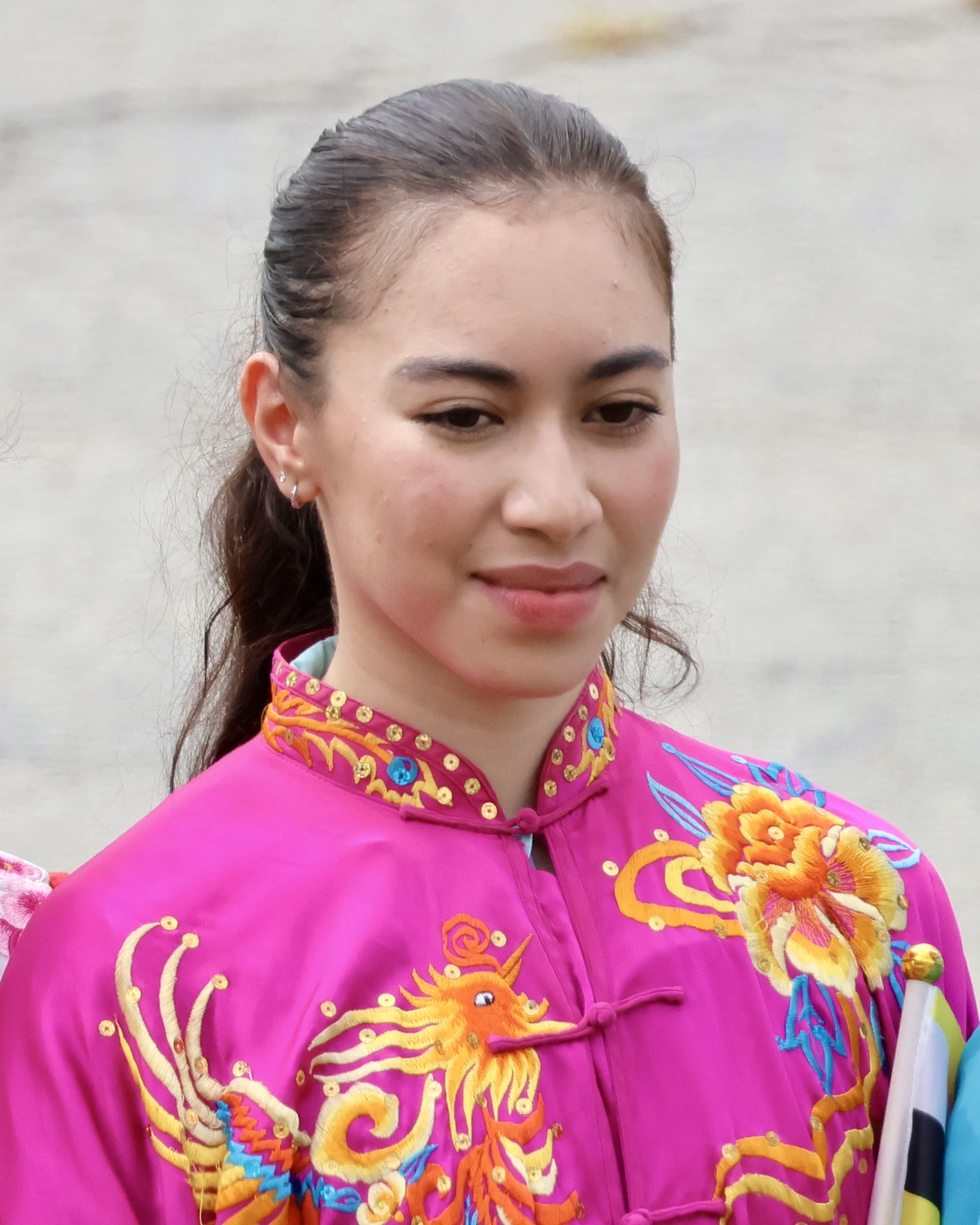
Basma Lackhar, Wushu athlete

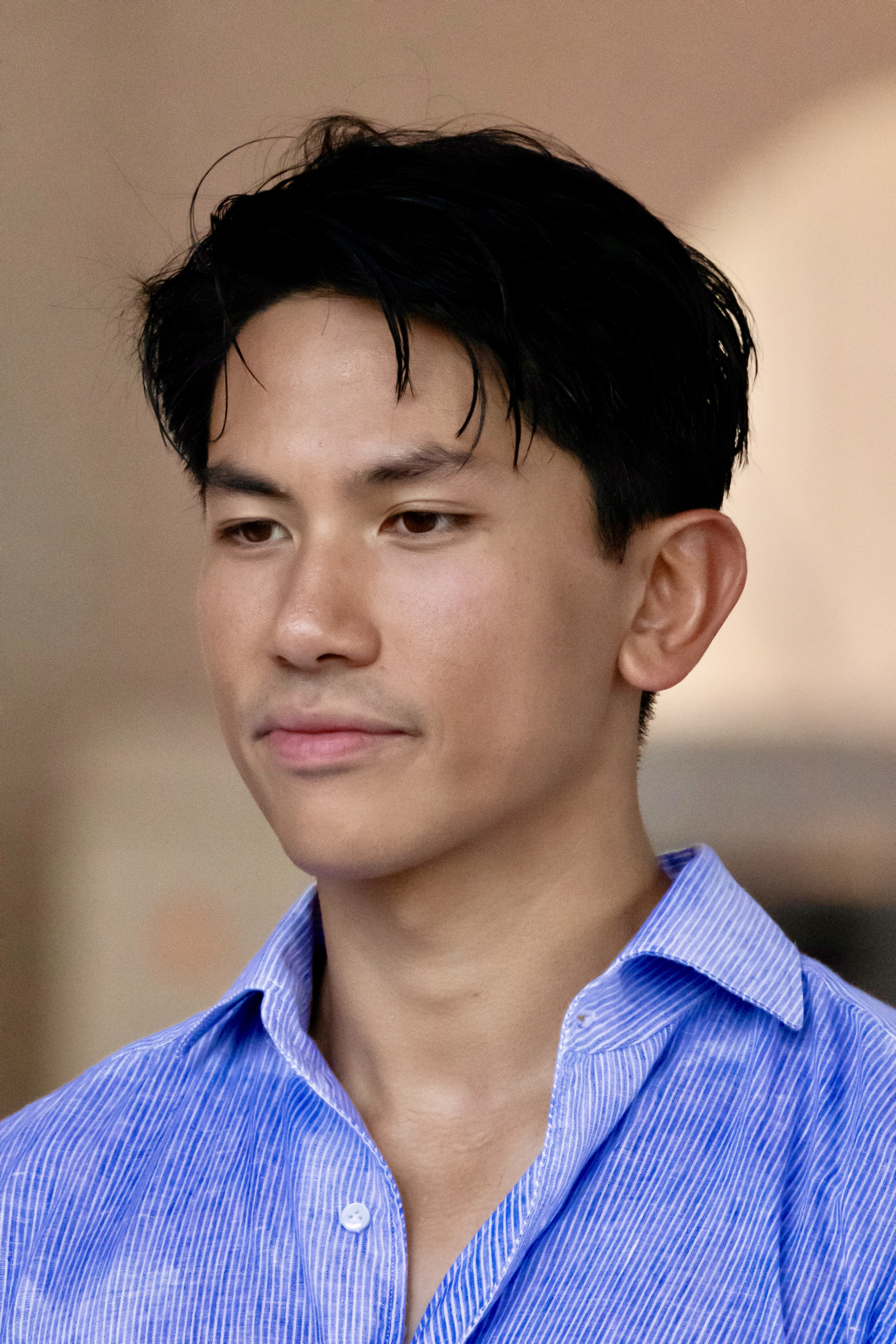
Prince Abdul Mateen

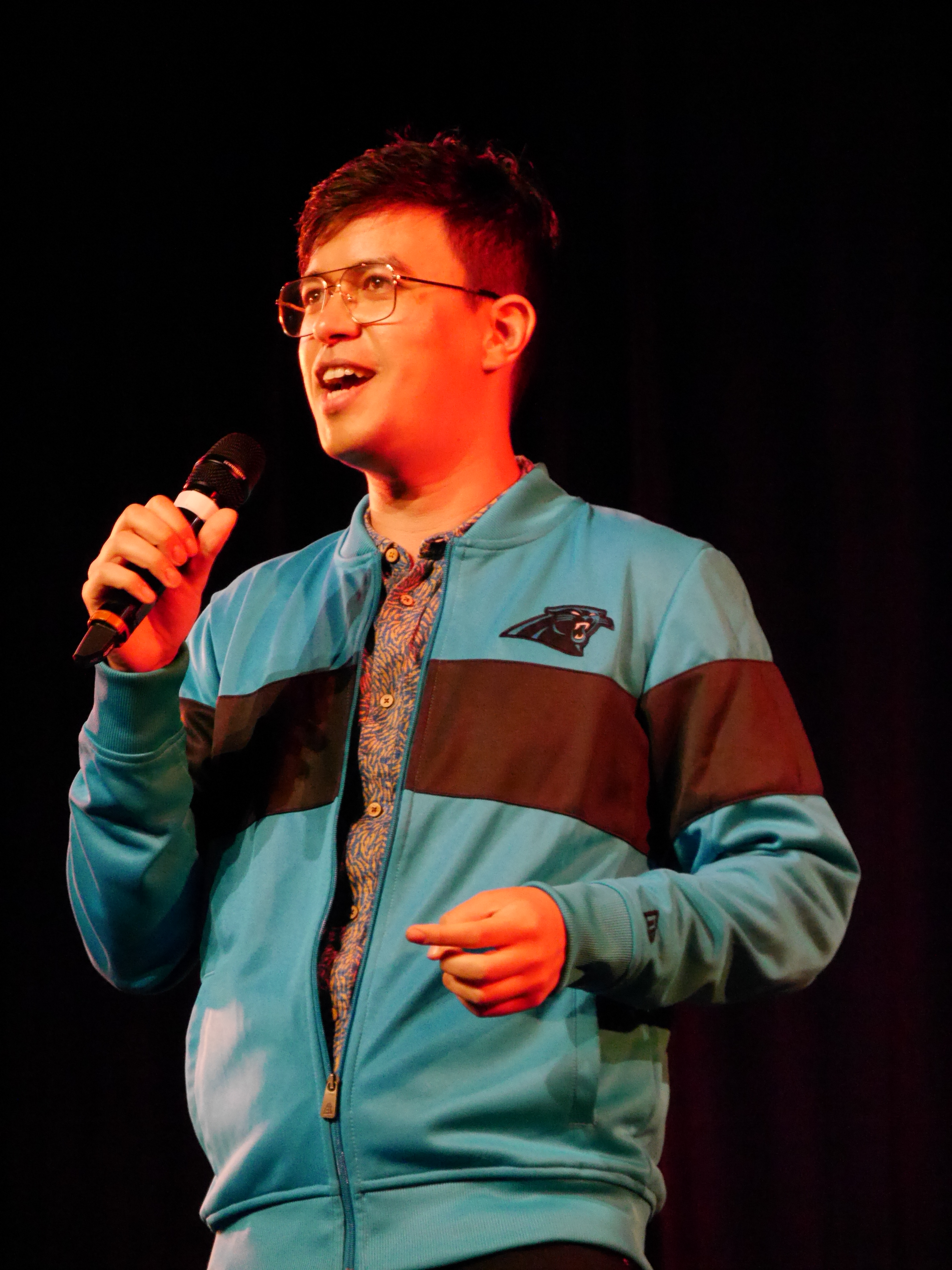
Phil Wang, stand-up comedian
