= Aisha Retno =

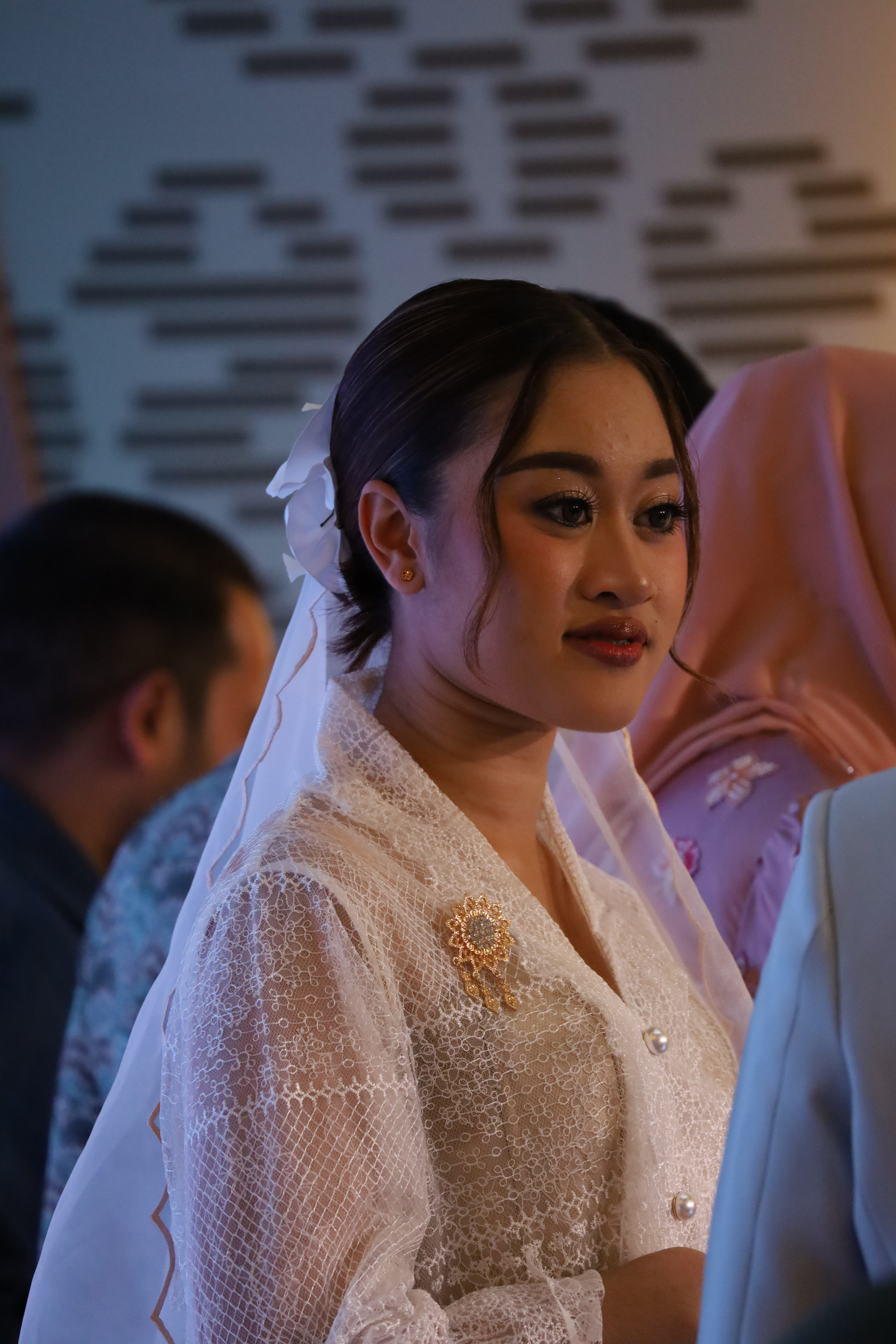
- Aisha in 2025
- Born: Sharifah Aisha Retno binti Sayed Sipulijam; 1 August 2000 (age 26); Kuala Lumpur, Malaysia
- Education: University of Malaya
- Occupations: Singer, songwriter, actress
- Years active: 2018–present
- Parents: Sayed Sipulijam bin Sayed Alwee (father); Jean Retno Aryani (mother)
- Musical career
- Genres: Pop, ballad, R&B, Soul
- Instruments: Vocals, piano
- Label: Sony Music Malaysia

Sharifah Aisha Retno Sayed Sipulijam (born 1 August 2000) is a Malaysian singer-songwriter and actress. In 2020, Aisha participated in the singing competition Vokal Mania. She came to prominence in the Malaysian music industry after the release of her English-language single, "W.H.U.T", in late 2021. In 2022, she was a contestant on season 4 of Big Stage, placing third overall.

== Early life and education ==
Aisha is of Malay-Arab-Javanese descent. Her mother is Indonesian kroncong singer, Jean Retno Aryani, who was active in the 1980s. Her father, Sayed Sipulijam Sayed Alwee, is a businessman from Kelantan of Malay-Arab ancestry. She has a younger brother, Sayed Abu Hanifa Radityo.

She was the champion of the Suara Emas, representing Kuala Lumpur on the national level, whilst in Form 4. She holds a bachelor's degree in economics from the University of Malaya.

== Career ==
She released her debut single "Mengikat Jiwa" after signing with Sony Music Malaysia, in 2018. The single was produced by Indonesian composer, Aldi Nadi Permana and was recorded in Indonesia.

In August 2020, Aisha released her second single "Terima Kasih", a duet with Indonesian singer, Yuka Kharisma. She took part in Sony Music Malaysia's Bring The Beat campaign alongside other artists including Sandra Dianne, Benzooloo and B-Heart, the campaign aimed to encourage artists to produce more songs.

Aisha initially rose to prominence on the TV3 singing talent show, Vokal Mania. She won the competition and was named Rookie Champion. In January 2021, Aisha released her single "Cinta Denganmu".

On 9 December 2021, Aisha released debut English-language track, "W.H.U.T." ("Wanna Hold U Tight"). The single did well on Spotify gaining up to 7 million streams on the platform within two months of release. The single debuted at number 3 on the RIM domestic/Malay singles streaming chart.

She was selected as one of the 11 contestants in the fourth season of Big Stage, she finished in third place. Aisha made her acting debut in the 2022 Malaysian telemovie, Cangkul, as the character Zura. On 29 July 2022, Aisha released her single "Sutera".

On 16 November 2024, it was scheduled for her first solo concert in Zepp Kuala Lumpur. However, the concert was canceled due to low ticket sales.

== Artistry ==
=== Influences ===
Aside from her mother, Aisha has cited Malaysian songstresses Siti Nurhaliza, Jaclyn Victor, Aina Abdul and Ernie Zakri as influences.

== Discography ==
=== Extended plays ===
| Title | EP details |
|---|---|
| A.R | Released: 24 November, 2023; Label: Faithful Music, SME Malaysia; Format: Digital download, streaming |
| Re.Hab | Released: 25 July, 2025; Label: Faithful Music; Format: Digital download, streaming |

=== Singles ===
List of singles as lead artist, with selected chart positions, showing year released and album name
| Title | Year | Peak chart positions | | | | Album |
| Title | Year | MYS | | | SGP (Note: The Official Southeast Asian Chart launched 23 January 2025. No official 'Dolla' chart history page, however the Aisha's charting history can be searched.) | Album |
| Title | Year | IFPI (Note: The Official Southeast Asian Chart launched 23 January 2025. No official 'Dolla' chart history page, however the Retno's charting history can be searched.) | RIM (Note: The Top 10 Domestic Singles chart was reconfigured into a Malay songs charts, starting the week ending 24 March 2022.) | Song (Note: The Billboard's Hits of the World charts launched and were first issued on 19 February 2022.) | SGP | Album |
|---|---|---|---|---|---|---|
| "Mengikat Jiwa" | 2018 | —N/a | – | —N/a | —N/a | Non-album singles |
| "Terima Kasih" with Yuka Kharisma | 2020 | —N/a | – | —N/a | —N/a | Non-album singles |
| "Cinta Denganmu" | 2021 | —N/a | – | —N/a | —N/a | Takdir Yang Tertulis OST |
| "Pulang Di Hari Raya" with Waheeda Bonn | 2021 | —N/a | – | —N/a | —N/a | Non-album single |
| "Nukilanku" | 2021 | —N/a | – | —N/a | —N/a | Masih Ada Rindu OST |
| "W.H.U.T." | 2021 | —N/a | 3 | —N/a | —N/a | Non-album singles |
| "Pencarianku" | 2022 | —N/a | – | – | —N/a | Non-album singles |
| "Sutera" | 2022 | —N/a | – | – | —N/a | A.R. |
| "I.L.S.M (I Love Sadness More) | 2022 | —N/a | – | – | —N/a | Non-album single |
| "JARAK" with Aziz Harun | 2023 | —N/a | – | – | —N/a | A.R. |
| "Untukmu - Verse 2023" with Fiza Thomas, Serene Claire, Tika Nasir | 2023 | —N/a | – | – | —N/a | Non-album single |
| "Ternoktah" | 2023 | —N/a | – | – | —N/a | A.R. |
| "Ketipak Ketipung Raya" with Aziz Harun | 2024 | 4 | 2 | 5 | —N/a | Non-album singles |
| "Samudera" | 2024 | —N/a | – | – | —N/a | Non-album singles |
| "Terbang" | 2024 | —N/a | – | – | —N/a | Non-album singles |
| "Ketipak Ketipung Raya (2025)" with Aziz Harun | 2025 | – | – | – | – | Non-album singles |
| "Tak Adil" | 2025 | – | 3 | – | – | [Re.Hab] |
| "JEDA" | 2025 | – | – | – | – | [Re.Hab] |
| "Semoga Saja" with Ade Govinda | 2026 | – | – | – | – | Non-album single |
| "Diari Air Mata" | 2026 | – | – | – | – | Non-album single |
| "心意相拌 | Gongxi Kemeriahan" (with Priscilla Abby) | 2026 | – | – | – | – | Non-album single |
| "Jodoh Lebaran" | 2026 | 1 | 1 | 1 | 13 | Non-album single |
"—" denotes a recording that did not chart or was not released in that territory.

==== As featured artist ====
List of singles as featured artist, showing year released, and album name
| Title | Year | Peak chart positions | Album |
| Title | Year | MYS | Album |
| Title | Year | Song | Album |
|---|---|---|---|
| "Kota Ini Tak Sama Tanpamu" (Nadhif Basalamah feat. Aisha Retno and Aziz Harun) | 2025 | 1 | Non-album single |

==== Guest appearances ====
List of non-single guest appearances, showing year released and album name
| Title | Year | Album |
|---|---|---|
| "dengari aku" (lucidrari feat. LastKhalif and Aisha Retno) | 2025 | teletext |

== Filmography ==
=== Television ===
| Year | Title | Role | Network | Notes |
|---|---|---|---|---|
| 2020 | Vokal Mania | Herself/contestant | TV3 | Rookie champion |
| 2022 | Big Stage | Herself/contestant | Astro Ria | Season 4. Third place. |
| 2022 | Cangkul | Zura | Astro Citra | Debut acting role; telemovie |
| 2023 | Gadis Muzikal | Melly | TV3 | Debut acting role; TV series |

== Awards and nominations ==
| Year | Award | Category | Nominated work | Result | Ref. |
|---|---|---|---|---|---|
| 2021 | 34th Anugerah Bintang Popular Berita Harian | Most Popular Newcomer – Female | Herself | Nominated | |
| 2024 | 38th Anugerah Juara Lagu | Second Place | Herself | Won | |
| | 38th Anugerah Juara Lagu | Best Performance | Herself | Won | |
