= Azrinaz Mazhar Hakim =

Former wife of Sultan Hassanal Bolkiah of Brunei

- Born: Azrinaz Mazhar binti Hakim Mazhar; 23 September 1979 (age 46); Kuala Lumpur, Malaysia
- Spouse: Sultan Hassanal Bolkiah (m. 2005; div. 2010) Fairos Khan Abdul Hamid (m. 2018)
- Issue: Prince Abdul Wakeel; Princess Ameerah; Areesya Malaykha; Atheera Medinah
- Father: Hakim Mazhar bin Mohammad Johar
- Mother: Fauziah binti Abdullah Mansoor
- Religion: Sunni Islam
- Occupation: Journalist

Azrinaz Mazhar binti Hakim Mazhar (born 23 September 1979) is a Malaysian former broadcast journalist. She was the third wife of Sultan Hassanal Bolkiah of Brunei from 2005 to 2010.

== Early life ==
Azrinaz was born on 23 September 1979 in Kuala Lumpur, Malaysia. She is the second child of Hakim Mazhar bin Mohammad Johar and Fauziah binti Abdullah Mansoor.

== Education and career ==
In 1997, Azrinaz graduated from the Malaysian Institute of Integrative Media (MIIM) with a degree in broadcasting.

She began working as broadcast journalist for Malaysian television network TV3 in 1999. Azrinaz was honoured as TV3's Most Promising Journalist in 2000 and also received the MIIM Alumni Award in 2002. She left TV3 in May 2005 to “venture into other undertakings.”

== Marriages and issue ==
=== First marriage ===
On 20 August 2005, Azrinaz married Sultan Hassanal Bolkiah in a private ceremony at Rumah Awang Alak Bertatar, the Sultan's official residence in Kuala Lumpur, Malaysia. News of the marriage was leaked two days later and the royal court confirmed it on the 24th. Azrinaz became the Sultan's junior wife as he was still married to his first wife, Queen Saleha. The marriage produced two children.

- Prince Abdul Wakeel (1 June 2006) in Bandar Seri Begawan, Brunei
- Princess Ameerah Wardatul (28 January 2008) in Bandar Seri Begawan, Brunei

On 16 June 2010, Sultan Hassanal Bolkiah announced that he had divorced Azrinaz with a single talaq for "special reasons." She was stripped of all of her titles, state decorations, and honours. The Sultan received full custody of the children and according to Azrinaz, she has not been able to see them since the divorce.

=== Second marriage ===
Azrinaz married for a second time on 1 May 2018, to Fairos Khan Abdul Hamid. Their solemnisation ceremony took place at her house and attended by family members and close friends. Their marriage has produced two daughters.

- Areesya Malaykha binti Fairos Khan (15 September 2019) at Gleneagles Hospital in Kuala Lumpur, Malaysia
- Atheera Medinah binti Fairos Khan (26 March 2021) at Gleneagles Hospital in Kuala Lumpur, Malaysia

== Titles, styles, and honours ==
=== Titles and styles ===
On 9 June 2006, the Sultan conferred the title and style Duli Yang Teramat Mulia Paduka Seri Pengiran Isteri Azrinaz Mazhar which can be translated in English as Her Royal Highness Princess Consort Azrinaz Mazhar. They were revoked on 16 Jun 2010 in conjunction with her divorce.

=== Honours ===
==== National ====
- ~~Recipient of the Royal Family Order of the Crown of Brunei (DKMB)~~ (20 August 2005 – revoked after divorce)

==== Foreign ====
- Jordan: Grand Cordon Special Class of the Supreme Order of the Renaissance (13 May 2008)
