= Re.Hab =

EP by Aisha Retno
- Released: July 25, 2025
- Recorded: 2025
- Genre: Pop
- Length: 17:43
- Languages: Malay; English
- Labels: Aisha Retno Entertainment; Faithful Music
- Producers: Aisha Retno; RADi; Jaydi; Seatravel

Aisha Retno chronology
A.R. (2023)	Re.Hab (2025)

Singles from Re.Hab
- 1. "Tak Adil" Released: 25 June 2025; 2. "Jeda" Released: 24 July 2025

Re.Hab (stylized as [RE.HAB]) is the second extended play (EP) by Malaysian singer, Aisha Retno, released on 25 July 2025 by her own label Aisha Retno Entertainment and Faithful Music.

== Production ==
After the release of her debut EP, A.R. (2023), Aisha Retno began recording new music for her second EP as early as 2025. She called the EP as a process of self-recovery after some difficult experiences she faced in her life and career in the past. In preparation to record the material for the EP, Aisha took hiatus from music career for six months and went on to produce the EP with her younger brother, RADi.

On the EP's title, Aisha said the title has a deeper and personal meaning and related witn her rehabilitation process. Aisha said about the EP: "I am very grateful because perhaps the main purpose of this album is to be a rehabilitation process for the tragedy that happened to me two or three years ago". She also admitted that most of the songs in Re.Hab were based on her own life experiences.

While three out of five songs in Re.Hab were in Malay, Aisha recorded only one track in English, entitled "O.R.B.I.T", which Aisha said it examines "about the feeling we dream when we love someone" and a multilingual song titled "Lengkapilah Kita (Missing Piece)", which its lyrics had in both Malay and English. According to Aisha, the song reflects "the feelings in the hearts of many people because of course we want to live as a couple and complement each other". It become the only song in the EP that recorded in both languages.

== Release and reception ==
The EP was released on 25 July 2025 to popular success. Two singles were released from the EP, with the first single being "Tak Adil" on 25 June. On 24 July, a day before the EP's launching, the second single, "Jeda" was released.

To promote the EP, Aisha performs all five songs in the EP at her exclusive showcase titled The A.I.S.H.A. Experience, which was held on 25 September 2025 at the JioSpace in Petaling Jaya, Selangor. It also earned her the Best Album, Best Album Recording and Best Local English Song categories at the 25th edition of Anugerah Industri Muzik.

== Track listing ==
All tracks are written by Aisha Retno except where noted.

No.	Title	Writer(s)	Length
1.	"Tak Adil"	Aisha Retno, RADi	3:08
2.	"Jeda"		3:29
3.	"O.R.B.I.T."		3:21
4.	"Lengkapilah Kita (Missing Piece)"		3:13
5.	"Titik Temu" (feat. Megat Fazly)	Aisha Retno, Megat Fazly	3:55
Total length:			17:43

== Awards ==
Award	Year	Recipient(s) and nominee(s)	Category	Result	Ref(s)
Anugerah Industri Muzik	2026	Re.Hab	Best Album	Won	
Anugerah Industri Muzik	2026	Re.Hab	Best Album Recording	Won	
Anugerah Industri Muzik	2026	"O.R.B.I.T."	Best Local English Song	Won	

== Release history ==
Release history
Region	Date	Format(s)	Label	Ref.
Malaysia	25 July 2025	CD; music download; streaming	Aisha Retno Entertainment, Faithful Music	
