= Aziz Harun =

Bruneian singer and actor

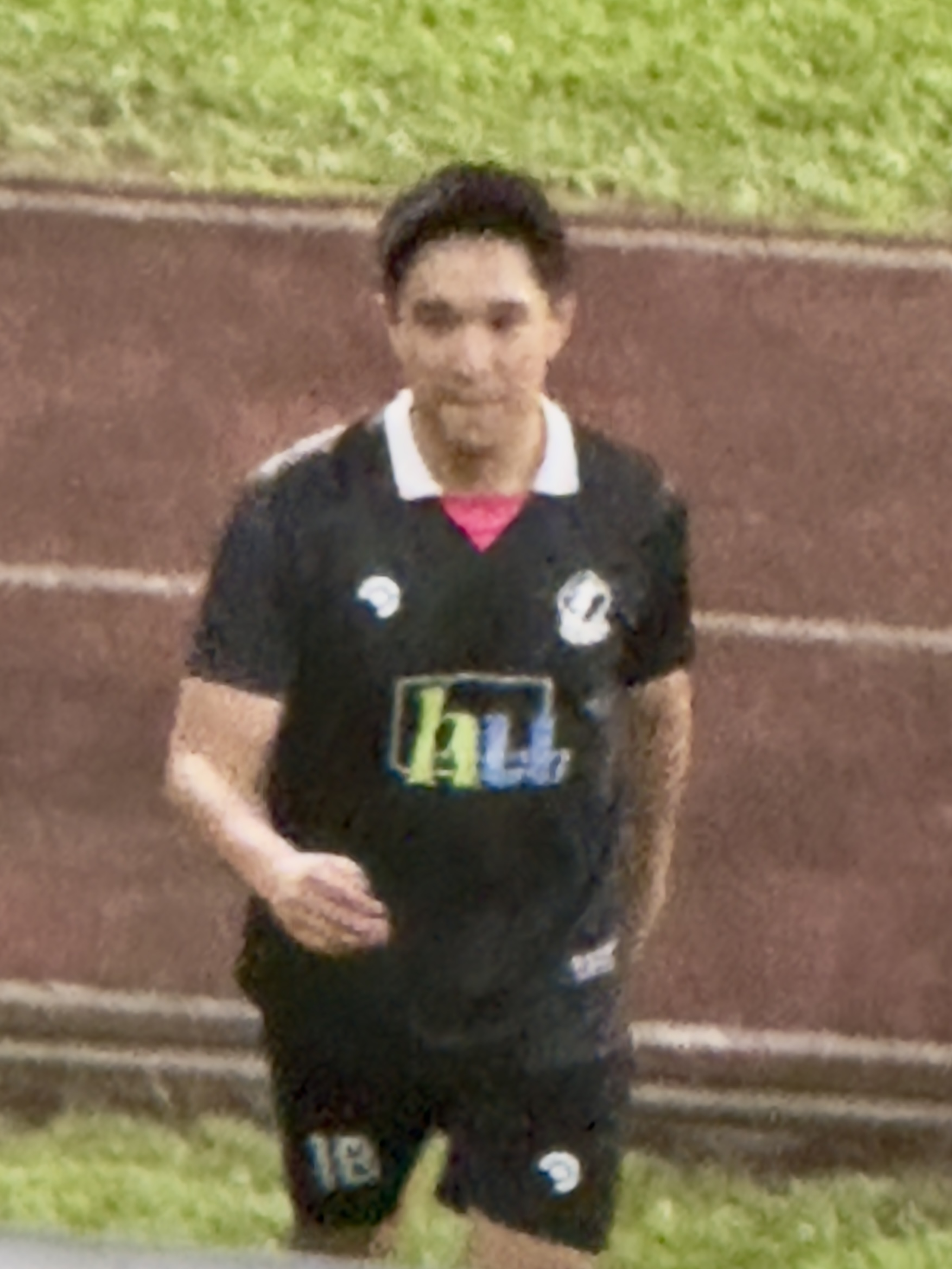
- Aziz in 2025
- Born: Abdul Aziz bin Harun; 2 December 1998 (age 27); Bandar Seri Begawan, Brunei
- Other name: Aziz Harun
- Education: Jerudong International School
- Alma mater: University of East Anglia
- Occupations: Singer; actor
- Years active: 2014 – present
- Musical career
- Genre: Pop
- Instruments: Vocals; guitar
- Labels: Warner Music Malaysia; Faithful Music; Universal Music Malaysia
- Website: Official website

Abdul Aziz bin Harun (born 2 December 1998) or commonly known by his stage name Aziz Harun, is a singer-songwriter and actor from Brunei who gained popularity in both his country and Malaysia with his most recent track, "Senyum." He is known for his unique fusion of Asian pop music, creating sounds that are fused between traditional Bruneian music with modern pop elements.

== Career ==
Since the age of six, Aziz has been singing and playing the guitar, following at the age of nine, he composed his first song. His victory in the 2009 Bruneian kids singing competition "Bintang Kecil" earned him the title of "Best Performer" and he was sent to Kuching to represent Brunei in an international singing competition. Then, in November 2010, he launched his debut single in Brunei, "Peace and Harmony." He received an invitation to participate in the "4th Marketplace of Creative Arts" in Bandung, Indonesia, in April 2012. 'Never Gonna Stop' was his second single, which was later made available in 2013. He stated that the pop and dance song had a Justin Bieber-like quality to it despite not really liking Justin Bieber, but he respect him for his integrity and hard work, and he believe that he has earned the title of adolescent idol.

Aziz was signed to Warner Music in 2014, but is currently managed by Universal Music Malaysia. With his song "Senyum," Aziz earned a name for himself in the Malaysian music industry in 2015. He was nominated for 'Best New Male Artiste' at the 2015 Anugerah Planet Muzik (APM), a Malay-language music awards ceremony. He went one step further the previous year when he won "Best Collaboration" for his song "Beautiful," which he co-wrote with artists Mike Chan and Omar K. and his mentor Faizal Tahir. This made him the first artist from Brunei to win an APM.

Aziz has been gradually developing his musical style from those early days on Radio Television Brunei (RTB). He is currently a recording artist with Faithful Music and is managed by Warner Music Malaysia. At an exclusive listening party for "Jangan" at the Bang & Olufsen dealership in Kiarong on 20 September 2017, the singer-songwriter extended an invitation to his Bruneian admirers. The duet track "Jarak" by singers Aziz and Aisha Retno was released in 2019. He claims that during that period, he was still in Brunei and Aisha was in Malaysia; during that time, Aisha only delivered voice recordings and the song Jarak's melody via email.

The last time they were featured was in April 2019 with the song "Jauh," which was a chart-topper, coming in at No. 7 on the RIM Chart for "Top 10 Most Streamed Local Songs in Malaysia." With his most recent hit on 13 December 2019, "Kembali." He took part in the second season of the entertainment reality show Big Stage 2019 as a competitor who would represent Brunei. However, after getting a chance to continue his education, he pulled out of the tournament. He rekindled the nation's music scene with his most recent single, "Kan," following his completion of his studies in the United Kingdom, which was formally released on 13 May 2021, through the Faithful Recording Company.

In March 2024, Aziz released the viral Hari Raya single, “Ketipak Ketipung Raya”, alongside Aisha Retno, which had more than a million streams on Spotify and more than three million views on YouTube since its debut just in time for Hari Raya Aidilfitri.

== Personal life ==
=== Family ===
Aziz is born on 2 December 1998, youngest of his six siblings (4 sisters and 1 brother). Since 2017, Aziz Harun's sister Molly Harun has taken over as manager, with Bahzi Damit, his former manager, concentrating more on creating videos. The production team behind Bahzi's latest music video, "Jangan," is @beedee.creative.

On 16 September 2011, Aziz and his brother Rahim visited UBD FM in their Baju Cara Melayu to have an interview for the Versus Show. They performed a few songs, including his upcoming hit, with his brother. He was noted to be quite bashful and hesitant among the DJs, both before and during the interview. He occasionally sings covers of members of his family, including his brother Rahim, sister Tharwana, cousins, and other similarly talented singers.

=== Education ===
Aziz obtained his early education at Jerudong International School (JIS), and successfully completed his bachelor's degree in business economics at the University of East Anglia in the United Kingdom in October 2021. He had to balance his studies with music, yet he still excelled in his A-levels in 2016. "I never got the chance to go on a full-fledged tour while I was preparing for my GCE O and A-levels. I've done magazine (promotions) and radio tours, but there was one thing I really missed out on, which I believe was a really big opportunity: doing mall tours," he says.

=== Move to Malaysia ===
He was prepared to leave his family in Brunei and relocate to Kuala Lumpur in order to pursue his artistic career and discover better prospects in the music industry in Malaysia. He would go on to claim that this would make him no longer required to travel back and forth as much. He acknowledged that he was hesitant to make the choice because he could not spend more time with both of his parents, but that it was not an easy one to make. He is appreciative, nonetheless, that his family supported him wholeheartedly and never dissuaded him from pursuing an artistic profession.

== Discography ==
=== Singles ===
List of singles as lead artist, showing year released and album name
Title	Year	Album
"Senyum"	2014	Non-album singles
"Beautiful"	2015	Non-album singles
"Mama" feat. Elizabeth Tan	2016	Non-album singles
"Jangan"	2017	Non-album singles
"Hana" with Hannah Delisha	2018	Non-album singles
"Jauh"	2019	Non-album singles
"Kembali"	2019	Non-album singles
"Chica" (JOOX Originals)	2020	Non-album singles
"Dua Puluh Dua Puluh"	2020	Non-album singles
"Sayang Kau Tercipta"	2021	Non-album singles
"Kan"	2022	Non-album singles
"Kita" with Alan D	2022	Non-album singles
"Hanya Mahukan Bye"	2022	Yang Benar
"Too Good At Telling Lies"	2022	Non-album single
"011"	2023	Yang Benar
"TY (for ruining my life)" with	2023	Yang Benar
"JARAK" with Aisha Retno	2023	Yang Benar
"Mengapa Harus Begini"	2023	Yang Benar
"Good Girl"	2023	Non-album singles
"Akhir Cerita" with Dalia Farhana	2023	Non-album singles
"LDDT"	2023	Non-album singles
"Dance In The Rain"	2024	Non-album singles
"Ketipak Ketipung Raya" with Aisha Retno	2024	Non-album singles
"Janji"	2024	Non-album singles
"Teman (Alhamdulillah)"	2024	Non-album singles
"Ketipak Ketipung Raya (2025)" with Aisha Retno	2025	Non-album singles
"Ruang & Waktu"	2025	Non-album singles
2025

==== Guest appearances ====
List of non-single guest appearances, with other performing artists, showing year released and album name
Title	Year	Other artist(s)	Album
"Ajarkan Aku"	2025	Amir Jahari	Penghibur Jalanan

== Filmography ==
=== Film ===
Year	Title	Role	Notes
TBA	Ammara Batrisya The Movie	Muhd Adif	First film

=== Drama ===
Year	Title	Character	TV Channel	Note
TBA	Ammara Batrisya 3	Muhd Adif	TV3	First drama

=== Television ===
Year	Title	Role	Broadcast	Notes	Ref.
2019	Big Stage 2	Participants	Astro Ria	Representing Brunei	
