= Princess Ameerah Wardatul Bolkiah =

Bruneian princess (born 2008)

Ameerah Wardatul Bolkiah أميرة وردة البلقية
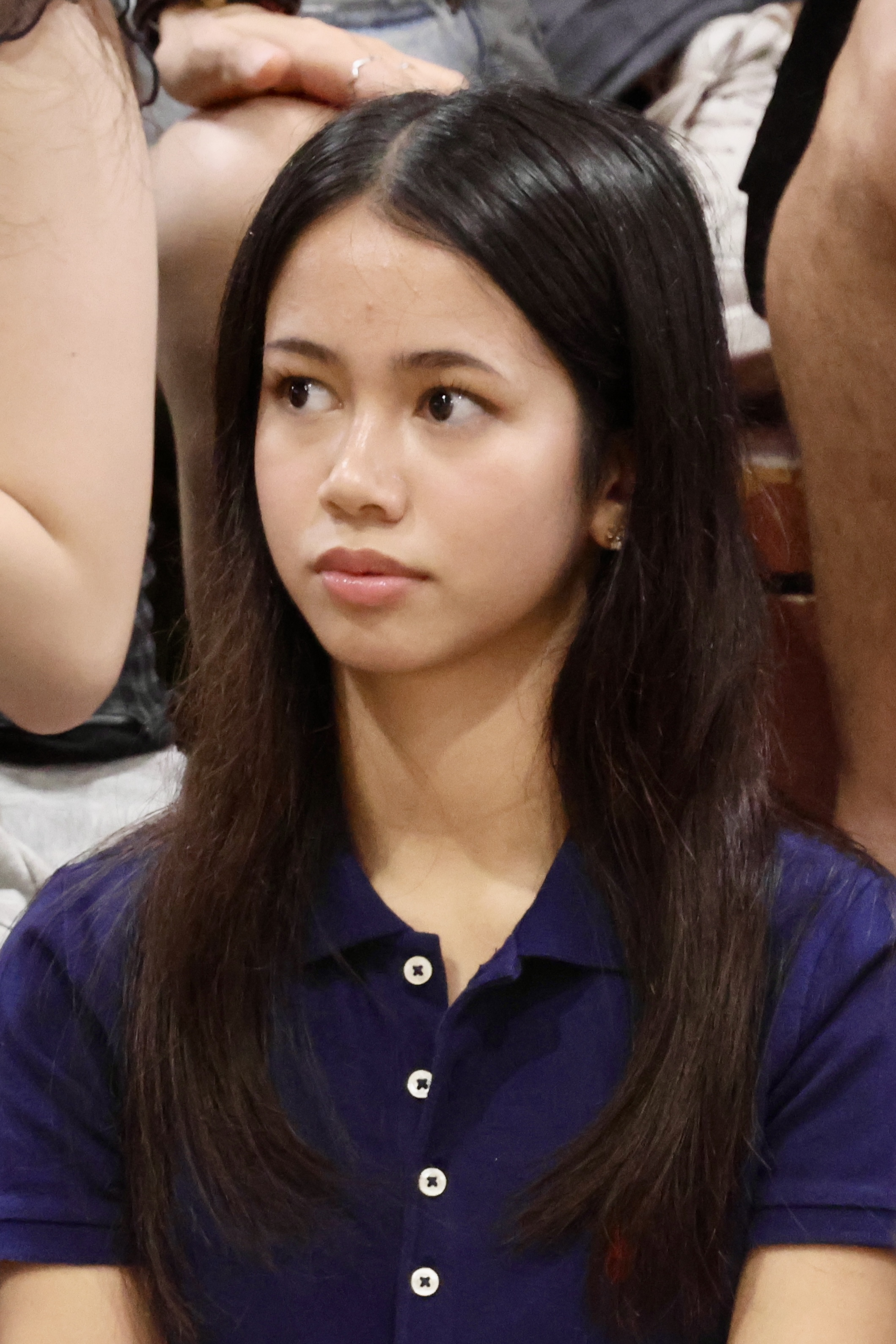
- Ameerah in 2023
- Born: Ameerah Wardatul Bolkiah binti Hassanal Bolkiah; 28 January 2008 (age 18); Bandar Seri Begawan, Brunei
- House: Bolkiah
- Father: Hassanal Bolkiah
- Mother: Azrinaz Mazhar Hakim
- Religion: Sunni Islam

Ameerah Wardatul Bolkiah binti Hassanal Bolkiah (Jawi: أميرة وردة البلقية; born 28 January 2008) is a member of the royal family of Brunei. She is the daughter of Sultan Hassanal Bolkiah by his former third wife, Azrinaz Mazhar Hakim.

== Early life ==
Princess Ameerah was born on 28 January 2008 to Sultan Hassanal Bolkiah and his third wife, Azrinaz Mazhar Hakim. Her parents divorced in 2010 and her father received full custody. She has one older brother, Prince Abdul Wakeel, along with ten half siblings from her father's first two marriages and two half siblings from her mother's second marriage.

== Education ==
Princess Ameerah attends Jerudong International School in Kampong Jerudong, Brunei. In March 2023, She earned the gold award in the Intermediate Mathematical Challenge and in September 2024, she achieved 8 A*/A grades in the International General Certificate of Secondary Education.

== Royal duties ==
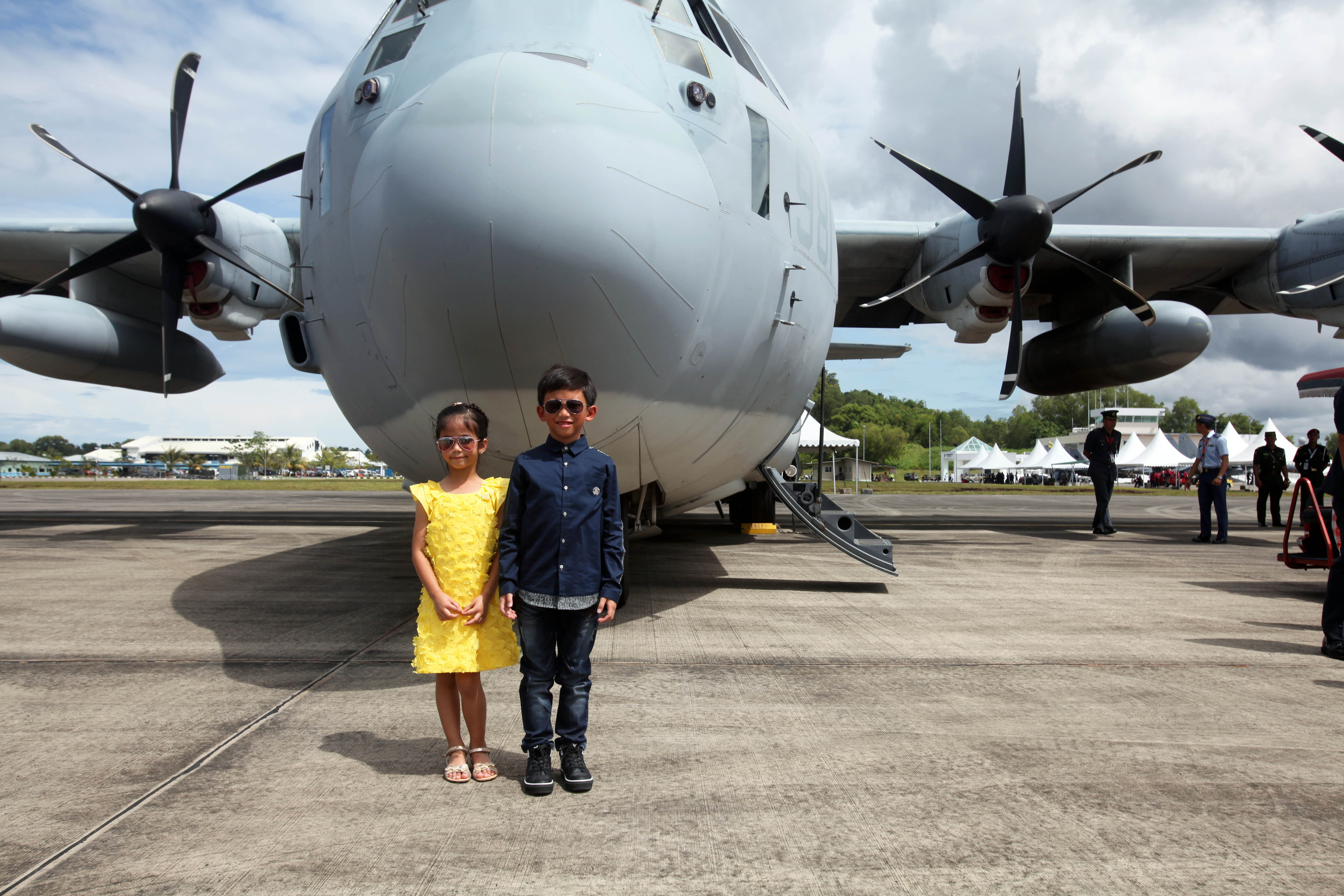
Princess Ameerah and Prince Wakeel in front of a KC-130J Super Hercules at BRIDEX in 2013

As a member of the royal family, Princess Ameerah participates in incoming state visits to Brunei, investiture ceremonies, and National Day celebrations.

With her brother, Prince Wakeel, she visited the Brunei Darussalam International Defence Exhibition in December 2013, opened a new area of Jerudong Park in July 2017, and attended the closing gala of the 5th ASEAN Children's Forum in August 2018.

In July 2024, she traveled to Kuala Lumpur for the installation of Ibrahim Iskandar of Johor as the 17th King of Malaysia.

== Titles, styles, and honours ==
=== Title and style ===
Her full title and style is Yang Teramat Mulia Paduka Seri Pengiran Anak Puteri Ameerah Wardatul Bolkiah Binti Kebawah Duli Yang Maha Mulia Sultan Haji Hassanal Bolkiah Mu'izzaddin Wad'daulah It is usually translated in English as Her Royal Highness Princess Ameerah of Brunei.

=== Honours ===
- Order of the Crown of Brunei (DKMB)
- Sultan of Brunei Golden Jubilee Medal (5 October 2017)
