= Guilty as Sin (disambiguation) =

Guilty as Sin may refer to:

== Music ==
- Guilty as Sin, a 2003 album by Brazen Abbot
- Guilty as Sin (album), a 2015 album by Girlschool
- "Guilty as Sin", a 2004 song by Kasey Chambers from the album Wayward Angel
- "Guilty as Sin", a 2005 song by DevilDriver from the album The Fury of Our Maker's Hand
- "Guilty as Sin", a 2015 single by Dan Talevski from the album High Times
- "Guilty as Sin?", a 2024 song by Taylor Swift

== Film and television ==
- Guilty as Sin, a 1993 American film
- "Guilty as Sin" (Daredevil), a 2016 episode of the television series Daredevil
- "...Guilty as Sin", a 2019 episode of the television series Light as a Feather
