= The Alchemy =

2024 song by Taylor Swift

Song by Taylor Swift

from the album The Tortured Poets Department
- Released: April 19, 2024
- Studio: Conway Recording (Los Angeles); Electric Lady (New York); Prime Recording (Nashville)
- Genre: Pop rock; electropop
- Length: 3:16
- Label: Republic
- Songwriters: Taylor Swift; Jack Antonoff
- Producers: Taylor Swift; Jack Antonoff

Lyric video
- "The Alchemy" on YouTube

"The Alchemy" is a song by the American singer-songwriter Taylor Swift from her eleventh studio album, The Tortured Poets Department (2024). Swift wrote and produced the track with Jack Antonoff. A pop rock and electropop track with R&B influences, "The Alchemy" is a love song about a burgeoning romance where two people cannot resist their chemistry. The lyrics use extensive football imagery to depict a sense of triumph.

In reviews of The Tortured Poets Department, critics considered "The Alchemy" the only song with a happy ending on the standard album. Some reviews deemed the football imagery and metaphors in the lyrics weak, but some others praised the production elements. "The Alchemy" peaked at number 18 on the Billboard Global 200 and reached the top 25 in Australia, Canada, New Zealand, and the United States. It received a platinum certification in Australia. Swift performed the track live twice on the Eras Tour in 2024.

== Background and release ==
Swift started working on The Tortured Poets Department immediately after she submitted her tenth studio album, Midnights, to Republic Records for release in 2022. She continued working on it in secrecy throughout the US leg of the Eras Tour in 2023. The album's conception took place when Swift's personal life continued to be a widely covered topic in the press. She described The Tortured Poets Department as her "lifeline" album which she "really needed" to make. Republic Records released it on April 19, 2024; "The Alchemy" is 15th on the track list.

Swift performed "The Alchemy" live twice on the Eras Tour in 2024. On May 12, Swift performed an acoustic guitar version of "The Alchemy", in a mashup with her track "Treacherous" (2012), at the fourth Paris show. On August 15, she sang a piano version, this time in a mashup with her track "King of My Heart" (2017), at the fourth London show. Swift released the Paris performance as part of a limited-time digital variant of The Tortured Poets Department on May 23, 2024.

== Music and lyrics ==
"The Alchemy" is an electropop and pop rock song with R&B influences in its instrumentation, composed of echoing drums and layered vocals. Will Hodgkinson of The Times wrote that it has a dreamy and romantic production that evokes the styles of the American singer-songwriter Stevie Nicks, while Annie Zaleski described the sound as hazy.

The lyrics use extensive football imagery to describe the burgeoning days of a new romantic relationship. Swift's character tells her new lover that she is willing to be all in ("So when I touch down/ Call the amateurs and cut 'em from the team") and admits that she does not have another choice ("Honestly, who are we to fight the alchemy?"). She also makes sarcastic remark as how her ex-lovers are removed from the team lineup. In the bridge, Swift's character describes a scene of triumph: her love interest, despite being in an underdog team, wins the football championship ("Shirts off, and your friends lift you up, over their heads"). At the end, he runs towards his "trophy", a metaphor for herself; "Where's the trophy? He just comes, running over to me."

Critics consider "The Alchemy" the only happy love song on an album primarily dealing with heartbreak. The literary critic Stephanie Burt identified "The Alchemy" as the only three tracks on The Tortured Poets Department: The Anthology that are not about failed romance; the other two are "So High School" (about a happy kind of love) and "Robin" (about co-producer Aaron Dessner's son). Time's Shannon Carlin wrote that the track's placement near the end of the standard album shows that Swift's character is willing to "fight again with this new one-of-a-kind guy" after detailing ex-lovers on the preceding tracks ("These blokes warm the benches/ We've been on a winning streak"). Lauren Huff of Entertainment Weekly agreed, saying that "The Alchemy", placed after "songs about heartache so bad that Swift compares it to 'cardiac arrest' in her epilogue", signaled a "good kind" of "madness". Vogue Australia's Nina Miyashita thought that the lyrics appear to draw a parallel between the chemicals released by the brain when playing a sport and those released when one is in love.

== Reception ==
Criticisms of the song mostly took issue with its lyrics. Some critics, such as The Atlantic's Spencer Kornharber, Slate's Carl Wilson, and Beats Per Minute's John Wohlmacher, considered the football imagery in the lyrics weak, "terrible", and "tossed-off". The Daily Telegraph's Neil McCormick said the track contains "cheesy sports puns". Writing for the Financial Times, Ludovic Hunter-Tilney said that the song was one of the "repetitive" tracks and opined that the title was used incorrectly. Lindsay Zoladz of The New York Times described the song as "weightless". Burt was somewhat more positive, deeming the football metaphors "flirtatious" and the overall message to contain "fun, hope, and patience".

Reviews that were somewhat more positive focused on the production. Sputnikmusic's Hugh G. Paddles argued that "The Alchemy" is an "otherwise effervescent and personally charged" track but criticized the "faux-narcotic slurred delivery" mentioning a drug reference near the ending lines. Wohlmacher praised the sound as "[laid] back and elegant" and said that the "mood of the composition" makes up for the lyrics. Hodgkinson gave the song a five-star rating, praising how it is "epic but intimate, like the final scene in a blockbuster". Ranking all 31 tracks on The Tortured Poets Department: The Anthology, Jason Lipshutz of Billboard placed "The Alchemy" at 21, calling it a "glittering love song". Alex Hopper of American Songwriter described the track as "sauntering, sexy".

Following its release, "The Alchemy" debuted and peaked at number 13 on the US Billboard Hot 100, where the song and tracks from the album made Swift the first artist to occupy the top 14 of the chart. In Australia, it opened at its peak of number 18 on the ARIA Singles Chart and made her the artist with the most top-50 entries in a single week with 29. Elsewhere, "The Alchemy" reached number 19 on the Billboard Global 200 and charted within the countries of New Zealand (19), Canada (21), Portugal (41), Switzerland (46), Sweden (65), and France (157). It also peaked at number 23 on the United Kingdom's Audio Streaming Chart and number 39 on Greece's International Top 100 Digital Singles.

== Personnel ==
Adapted from the liner notes of The Tortured Poets Department

- Taylor Swift – vocals, songwriter, producer
- Jack Antonoff – producer, songwriter, drums, programming, percussion, synthesizer, electric guitar, background vocals, cello
- Serban Ghenea – mixing
- Bryce Bordone – mix engineer
- Laura Sisk – recording, vocal engineer
- Oli Jacobs – recording
- Jon Sher – assistant recording engineer
- Jack Manning – assistant recording engineer
- Christopher Rowe – vocal engineer
- Sean Hutchinson – recording, drums
- Randy Merrill – mastering

== Charts ==
Chart (2024)	Peak position
Australia (ARIA)	18
Canada Hot 100 (Billboard)	21
France (SNEP)	157
Global 200 (Billboard)	19
Greece International (IFPI)	39
New Zealand (Recorded Music NZ)	19
Philippines (Billboard)	25
Portugal (AFP)	41
Sweden (Sverigetopplistan)	65
Swiss Streaming (Schweizer Hitparade)	46
UK Streaming (OCC)	23
US Billboard Hot 100	13

== Certification ==
Certification for "The Alchemy"
Region	Certification	Certified units/sales
Australia (ARIA)	Platinum	70,000^{‡}
Brazil (Pro-Música Brasil)	Platinum	40,000^{‡}
New Zealand (RMNZ)	Gold	15,000^{‡}
United Kingdom (BPI)	Silver	200,000^{‡}
^{‡} Sales+streaming figures based on certification alone.
