= Imgonnagetyouback =

2024 song by Taylor Swift

Song by Taylor Swift

from the album The Tortured Poets Department: The Anthology
- Released: April 19, 2024
- Studio: Electric Lady (New York City)
- Genre: Synth-pop; pop-R&B
- Length: 3:42
- Label: Republic
- Songwriters: Taylor Swift; Jack Antonoff
- Producers: Taylor Swift; Jack Antonoff

Lyric video
- "Imgonnagetyouback" on YouTube

"Imgonnagetyouback" (stylized in all lowercase) is a song by the American singer-songwriter Taylor Swift. Written and produced by her and Jack Antonoff, it was released in the double album edition of her eleventh studio album, The Tortured Poets Department: The Anthology (2024). Led by restrained, trap-influenced beats, muted keyboards, and millennial-styled backing vocals, the track was categorized as synth-pop and pop-R&B by critics. The lyrics are about the considerations of restoring a past relationship that makes Swift indecisive about whether to reconcile with an ex-partner who broke up with her or get revenge.

Critics compared "Imgonnagetyouback" to Olivia Rodrigo's track "Get Him Back!" (2023), frequently drawing similarities with their lyricism. Several deemed the song unremarkable or underwhelming, while others were more appreciative of it. Commercially, the track peaked at number 28 on the Billboard Global 200 chart and reached the top 30 of national charts in Australia, Canada, New Zealand, and the United States. It received certifications in Australia, Brazil, New Zealand, and the United Kingdom. Swift performed the song live on acoustic guitar, as part of mashups of her songs, in two shows of her Eras Tour in July 2024.

== Background and production ==
Taylor Swift ѕtarted work on her eleventh original studio album, The Tortured Poets Department, following the completion of her previous album, Midnights (2022). She continued on it during the US leg of her Eras Tour in 2023, when the tour heightened her fame while she was experiencing intense media reports on her personal life. Swift described the album as a "lifeline" for her and one that she "needed" to create, detailing how its development somewhat reminded her that songwriting was an integral part of her life. 31 songs were written or co-written by Swift for The Tortured Poets Department; Jack Antonoff, who worked on all of Swift's albums since 1989 (2014), co-produced 16 of those songs, including "Imgonnagetyouback".

The track was written and produced by Swift and Antonoff, who provided programming and played acoustic guitars, drums, percussion, piano, and synthesizers including Juno 60, M1 keyboard, and Prophet 5. Jack Manning, one of the assistant engineers alongside Joey Miller and Jozef Caldwell, also played piano. Laura Sisk and Oli Jacobs recorded the song at Electric Lady Studios in New York City. Serban Ghenea mixed it at Mixstar Studios in Virginia Beach. The track was engineered by Bryce Bordone and mastered for vinyl by Ryan Smith.

== Music and lyrics ==
"Imgonnagetyouback"
Restrained, trap-influenced beats, muted keyboards, and millennial-styled backing vocals accompany the song, in which Swift is ambivalent of either reconciling with an ex-partner or getting revenge.

"Imgonnagetyouback" has a length of 3 minutes and 42 seconds. It is led by restrained, trap-influenced beats, muted keyboards, and backing vocals that Paolo Ragusa of Consequence described as "millennial-coded". Critics labeled the track as subtle and "upbeat" and classified it as synth-pop and "pop-R&B". Damien Somville and Marine Benoit wrote that Swift's flow and melody and the backing vocals veered towards R&B and were "[a]ssertive and sexy". Writing for Vanity Fair, Kase Wickman regarded its opening as a parallel to that of the 1975's "Looking For Somebody (To Love)" (2022). The journalist Annie Zaleski called it not only congruent of Midnights sonically with the "dusky electropop" sound but also thematically with the "late-night ruminations on the past".

The lyrics of "Imgonnagetyouback" are about the considerations of whether rekindling a romantic relationship would be healthy or not. In it, Swift sees a chance of reconciling with an ex-partner, who was the one who broke up with her, but she is uncertain about if this reunion would occur in either restoring a past relationship or another quarrel between them. As a result, Swift is indecisive on whether she should reconnect with him or have revenge. Critics like Billboard's Ashley Iasimone and Elite Daily's Dylan Kickham thought the song was about flirting with an ex-partner. while Jon Pareles of The New York Times said that it was "partly a wordplay exercise [...] with pushback at its core." Emily Bootle from The i Paper wrote that the track includes Swift's "trademark romantic extremes" and recalls the "chaos-fetishisation" of her song "Blank Space" (2014).

Throughout the track, Swift contemplates on her ongoing matters with the ex-partner in a playful manner, alternating between threatening revenge on him and imagining their reunion. It begins with her describing a scene ("Lilac short skirt, the one that fits me like skin"), before she states, "I'll tell you one thing, honey/ I can tell when somebody still wants me, come clean". In the chorus, Swift uses the titular phrase as a double entendre to either reconcile with him or destroy his possessions. At one point during the song, Swift favorably compares herself to an Aston Martin vehicle ("I'm an Aston Martin that you steered straight into the ditch"). As it progresses into the conclusion, she moves on and starts over again: "I can feel it coming, [...] [humming], in the way you move"/ "Push the reset button, we're becoming something new"/ "Say you got somebody [...], [I'll] say, 'I got someone too' "/ "Even if it's handcuffed, I'm leaving here with you".

"Imgonnagetyouback" received comparisons to Olivia Rodrigo's song "Get Him Back!" (2024) from critics, some of whom believed that the song alongside its theme and sentiments are similar to Rodrigo's. Others further thought the track's aspects were identical to that of "Get Him Back!". Kickham found "both songs center on the same play on words". Nate Jones of Vulture wrote it had nearly alike "conceit and striking lyrical similarities", (Note: Jones highlighted the lyrics "Whether I'm gonna be your wife or gonna smash up your bike, I haven't decided yet" from "Imgonnagetyouback" and "I want to key his car; I want to make him lunch" from "Get Him Back!" as an example of this.) but he nonetheless stated that "this is likely a simple case of parallel thinking rather than plagiarism, especially as the two songs sound nothing alike". Although believing that the song utilized "identical wordplay and styling", Elle's Lauren Puckett-Pope agreed with Jones' last sentiment, feeling that the songs considerably differ in their soundscapes: "Imgonnagetyouback" is "quieter, ethereal synth-pop" while "Get Him Back!" is "high-tempo [and] percussive". On the other hand, Nina Miyashita and Jonah Waterhouse from Vogue Australia felt they varied in "many creative ways".

Although Swift did not confirm who the song's subject was, some critics and publications speculated that it could potentially be one of Swift's former romantic partners. The Daily Telegraph's Poppie Platt opined that the subject was Joe Alwyn, who until early–2023 had a six-year relationship with Swift, mainly because she felt that it was similar sonically to Swift's previous songs that she believed to be about him. (Note: Namely, "Call It What You Want" (2017) and the tracks from Swift's album, Lover (2019).) Puckett-Pope considered it to be most probably Matty Healy, who dated Swift in 2023 after her breakup with Alwyn, according to the several lines she analyzed. The British radio station, Capital, regarded it as Alwyn based on the many interpreted lyrics, one of them about moving on that the station thought alluded to Swift progressing into a relationship with Healy or her current romantic partner Travis Kelce, following her parting with Alwyn.

== Release and commercial performance ==
"Imgonnagetyouback" became available under Republic Records on April 19, 2024, as part of a double album edition of The Tortured Poets Department, subtitled The Anthology, two hours after the standard edition was released; it is listed as 18th in the track list. In July 2024, Swift performed the song live on acoustic guitar, as part of mashups with her other songs, in two shows of the Eras Tour. She sang it for the first time during a show at Amsterdam on July 5, fusing it with "Dress" (2017). At a Munich show on July 28, Swift combined the track with "I Don't Wanna Live Forever" (2016).

"Imgonnagetyouback" reached the top 30 of the Billboard Global 200 chart (at 28), as well as in the national charts of Canada (29) and New Zealand (30). In the United States, the track peaked at number 26 on the Billboard Hot 100, where it assisted Swift in having the most single–week entries among women with 32. In Australia, the song reached number 23 on the ARIA Singles Chart and helped make Swift the artist with the most single–week entries on the chart with 29. The track further peaked at number 70 in Portugal and number 99 in Switzerland. On other charts, it reached Greece's International Top 100 Digital Singles chart (at 62), Sweden's Heatseeker chart (3), and the United Kingdom's audio streaming (32) and sales charts (61). The song has been certified in two countries, receiving silver in the United Kingdom, gold in Australia and New Zealand, and platinum in Brazil.

== Critical reception ==
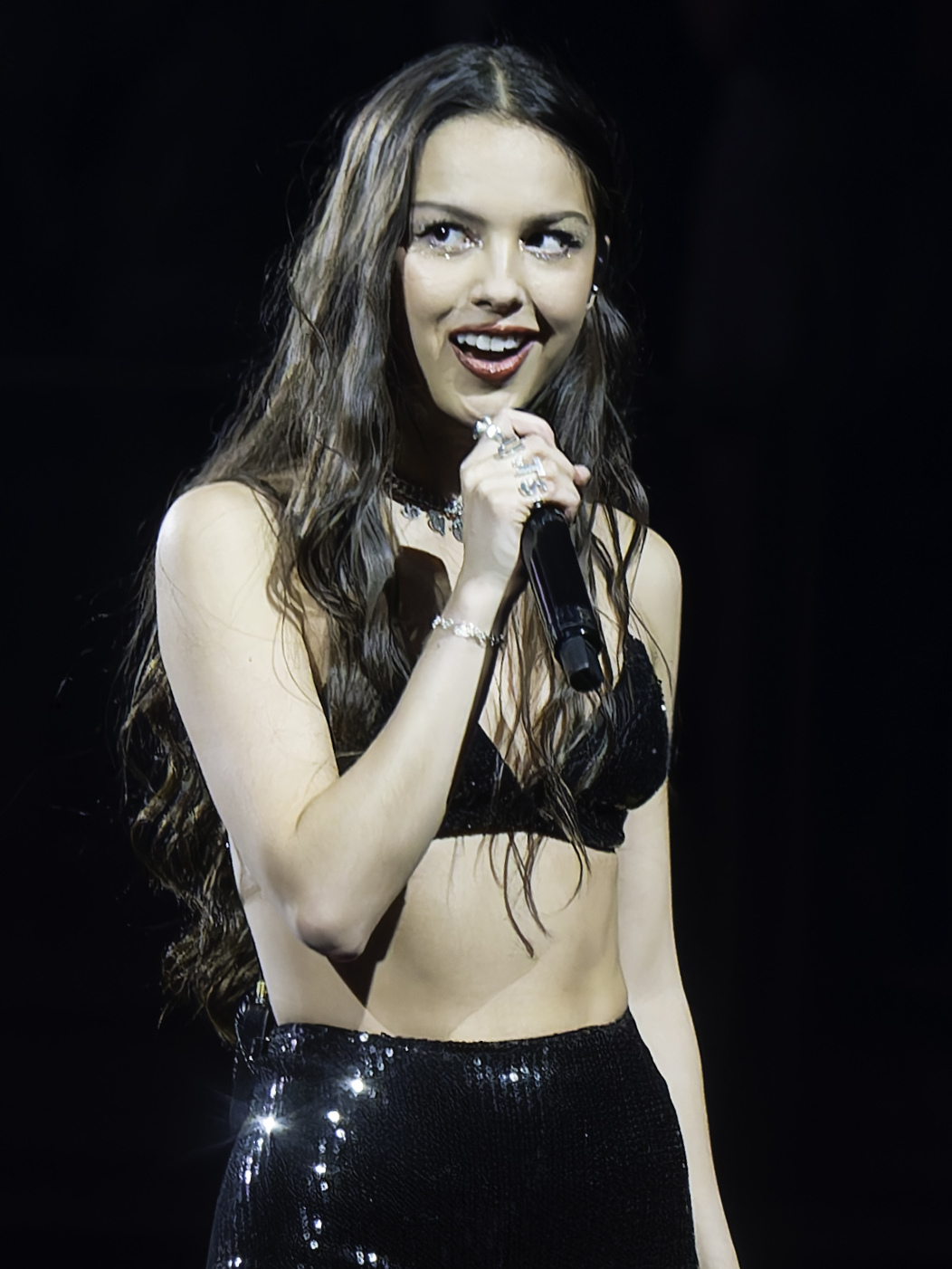
Some critics positively or negatively compared the track to "Get Him Back!" (2023), a song by Olivia Rodrigo (pictured).

Several critics found the song unremarkable or understated. Writing for Beats Per Minute, John Wohlmacher considered the track "somewhat banal synth-pop", and it became an immediate skip for him after multiple listens. Rob Sheffield from Rolling Stone called the song a "catchy oddity" similar to "Get Him Back!", although he opined that it does not have the part where Swift "meet this guy's mom just to tell her her son sucks." Screen Rant's Lynn Sharpe said that, aside from the "catchy" hook and how Swift delivered some of the bridge's lyrics, the track was "simply fine" though unmemorable. While also calling it "simply fine", Ragusa negatively compared the song's take on the concept of "Get Him Back!" to that, believing that it was lacking in quality and, alongside the backing vocals, was and deserved to be excluded from 1989. Jones thought the song was unnecessary to be within the double album.

Others were more appreciative towards the song. Ryan Fish of The Hollywood Reporter regarded the song as Swift's "catchy" approach to the concept of "Get Him Back!", and Business Insider's Callie Ahlgrim recommended it for listening. In Billboard, Jason Lipshutz described its production as dainty and "shuddering" where Swift confidently sings her intentions. Bootle considered the line comparing Swift to an Aston Martin one of the best metaphors from the double album, while Neil McCormick from The Daily Telegraph said that it was among The Anthology's "memorable lines that could make an ex wince".

== Personnel ==
Credits are adapted from the liner notes of The Tortured Poets Department: The Anthology.

- Taylor Swift – lead vocals, songwriting, production
- Jack Antonoff – songwriting, production, programming, acoustic guitars, drums, Juno 60, M1 keyboard, percussion, piano, Prophet 5
- Jack Manning – piano, engineering assistance
- Bryce Bordone – engineering
- Joey Miller – engineering assistance
- Jozef Caldwell – engineering assistance
- Laura Sisk – recording
- Oli Jacobs – recording
- Serban Ghenea – mixing
- Ryan Smith – vinyl mastering

== Charts ==
Chart (2024)	Peak position
Australia (ARIA)	23
Canada Hot 100 (Billboard)	29
Global 200 (Billboard)	28
Greece International (IFPI)	62
New Zealand (Recorded Music NZ)	30
Portugal (AFP)	70
Sweden Heatseeker (Sverigetopplistan)	3
Swiss Streaming (Schweizer Hitparade)	99
UK Singles Sales (OCC)	61
UK Streaming (OCC)	32
US Billboard Hot 100	26

== Certifications ==
Certifications for "Imgonnagetyouback"
Region	Certification	Certified units/sales
Australia (ARIA)	Gold	35,000^{‡}
Brazil (Pro-Música Brasil)	Platinum	40,000^{‡}
New Zealand (RMNZ)	Gold	15,000^{‡}
United Kingdom (BPI)	Silver	200,000^{‡}
^{‡} Sales+streaming figures based on certification alone.
