= The Tortured Poets Department =

- Standard edition cover

Studio album by Taylor Swift
- Released: April 19, 2024
- Recorded: c. 2022–2024
- Studios: Conway Recording (Hollywood); Electric Lady (New York City); Esplanade (New Orleans); Long Pond (Hudson Valley); Miloco (London); Rue Boyer A (Paris)
- Genres: Synth-pop; chamber pop; folk-pop
- Length: 65:08
- Label: Republic
- Producers: Taylor Swift; Jack Antonoff; Aaron Dessner; Patrik Berger

Taylor Swift chronology
1989 (Taylor's Version) (2023)	The Tortured Poets Department (2024)	The Life of a Showgirl (2025)

The Anthology cover
- Digital edition cover

Singles from The Tortured Poets Department
- 1. "Fortnight" Released: April 19, 2024; 2. "I Can Do It with a Broken Heart" Released: July 2, 2024

The Tortured Poets Department (stylized in all caps) is the eleventh studio album by the American singer-songwriter Taylor Swift. It was released on April 19, 2024, through Republic Records, followed two hours later by the surprise release of a double album edition subtitled The Anthology. Swift wrote and produced the album with Jack Antonoff and Aaron Dessner over a two-year period, including during the Eras Tour in 2023.

An autobiographical album reflecting a period of personal upheaval and heightened fame, The Tortured Poets Department explores ill-fated romance and its resulting emotions, including grief, anger, longing, and delusion, through hyperbolic, confrontational, and self-aware lyrics that incorporate literary allusions. The standard edition, primarily produced by Antonoff, is largely minimalist synth-pop characterized by synthesizers, programmed drums, and sustained bass. Dessner principally produced The Anthology, which mostly consists of acoustic chamber pop and folk-pop ballads driven by piano and guitar. Elements of country, rock, and electronica are also interspersed throughout the record.

Swift promoted The Tortured Poets Department through social media and streaming platforms and incorporated it into the Eras Tour in 2024. It topped charts and received multi-platinum certifications across the Americas, Europe, and Asia-Pacific, becoming the global best-selling album of 2024. In the United States, it debuted atop the Billboard 200 with 2.61 million album-equivalent units and spent 17 weeks at number one. All 31 songs entered the Billboard Hot 100, and Swift became the first artist to simultaneously occupy its top 14 positions. The album spawned two singles: the US chart-topper "Fortnight" featuring Post Malone and the top-three entry "I Can Do It with a Broken Heart".

The Tortured Poets Department polarized music critics; positive reviews praised the cathartic narrative songwriting as emotionally resonant and deemed the album one of Swift's finest works, while mixed reviews described the production as redundant and the lyrics as verbose rather than poetic. Within weeks of its release, several journalists reassessed the album more favorably and argued that its length and Swift's media overexposure had influenced the initial reception. The Tortured Poets Department received an ARIA Music Award, a Premios Odeón, and a Japan Gold Disc Award, and was nominated for Album of the Year and Best Pop Vocal Album at the 2025 Grammy Awards.

== Background ==
In March 2023, Taylor Swift embarked on the Eras Tour, which she conceived as a retrospective tour that paid tribute to all of the albums in her discography. The Eras Tour became the first concert tour to gross $1 billion in revenue, and its huge success propelled Swift's global fame to unprecedented levels, becoming a subject of academic studies in marketing, economics, and sociology. She began working on her eleventh studio album immediately after completing her tenth, Midnights (2022), and recorded it with longtime collaborators, the producers Jack Antonoff and Aaron Dessner, while she was on the American leg of the Eras Tour.

Amidst the heightened fame, throughout 2023, Swift's personal life was a subject widely covered and debated by both her fans and the press, who routinely reported on her breakup with the actor Joe Alwyn after six years of dating, an alleged brief romantic link with the musician Matty Healy, and a new relationship with the American football player Travis Kelce. At the 66th Annual Grammy Awards on February 4, 2024, during her acceptance speech for the Best Pop Vocal Album award for Midnights, Swift announced the title of her eleventh studio album, The Tortured Poets Department. Swift shared with her audience at an Eras concert in Melbourne on February 16, 2024, that writing The Tortured Poets Department was a "lifeline" for her because it made her reflect on how songwriting was an integral part of her life.

== Themes and lyrics ==
=== Standard edition ===
The standard edition of The Tortured Poets Department consists of 16 songs, including two written solely by Swift—"My Boy Only Breaks His Favorite Toys" and "Who's Afraid of Little Old Me?, eight co-written with Antonoff, and five with Dessner. The rapper and singer Post Malone is featured on and co-wrote "Fortnight", while the musician Florence Welch is featured on "Florida!!!". In a self-written epilogue included at the end of the album's packaging, Swift situates herself as the "Chairman of the Tortured Poets Department" and details the overall narrative: she references the end of a long-term relationship, which transitions into a short-lived rebound romantic fling that painfully ends. In social media posts, she framed The Tortured Poets Department as an introspective album that reflects "events, opinions and sentiments from a fleeting and fatalistic moment in time—one that was both sensational and sorrowful in equal measure". According to some critics, by naming the album The Tortured Poets Department, Swift situated herself as a songwriter rooted in poetry's tradition of detailing the human experience with lost love and self-torment: from ancient times (Catullus, Sappho) and medieval times (Petrarch) to the European "poète maudit" archetype (Arthur Rimbaud, Charles Baudelaire).

Tortured Poets is the culmination of a catalog full of songs in which Swift has taken us into the bedrooms where men pleasured or misled her, the bars where they charmed her, the empty playgrounds where they sat on swings with her and promised something they couldn't give.

— Ann Powers, NPR

Using autobiographical songwriting that combines country music's detail-heavy narratives and rock music's self-mythologizing, the songs reference her cathartic phase while dealing with personal upheavals caused by romantic failures and heightened fame. A heavily personal album, The Tortured Poets Department depicts emotions like anger, mourning, confusion, regret, longing, and delusion, which are told via lyrical narratives that are messy, unbridled, and unguarded—they mirror the experiences of grief and explore themes like erotic desires, forbidden love, and escaping from the public eye to extremes, in a hyperbolic and confrontational manner. The music critic Ann Powers summarized the content as a novel-like song collection about "emotional violence" that is imposed onto women by their male lovers and even by themselves. She further commented that the lyrical details were so personal that they showcased Swift at her most vulnerable but also most ruthless.

The overall sentiments are grim and sombre, brought by lyrical imagery of death, murder, prison, mental health spirals, narcotics, and alcoholism. There are religious undertones, use of profanity, and internet culture-inspired slang in addition to literary allusions. According to the popular-culture academic Eloise Faichney, the writing style combining informal language with formal poetic traditions was emblematic of Instapoetry, used by her generation of millennials, particularly women, to convey their experiences in prose or poetry using social media.

The first major theme, the dissolution of a years-long relationship, is anchored by "So Long, London", in which Swift's narrator bids farewell to an ex-partner and their romance in London. She resents how the lost love wasted her youth and how she tried to rescue it to no avail, a theme that is also detailed in "My Boy Only Breaks His Favorite Toys", in which she is in denial that the relationship is no longer salvageable. The second major theme, the transition to a passionate fling that abruptly ends, is detailed across most tracks, which combine autobiographical details with fictionalized narratives and use devices like hyperbole or melodrama for impact. "Fortnight" details a two-week-long romance that entails jealousy and murderous thoughts, while "Fresh Out the Slammer" compares the old romance to a suffocating prison and depicts Swift's narrator escaping from it the moment it ends, to get together with an old flame.

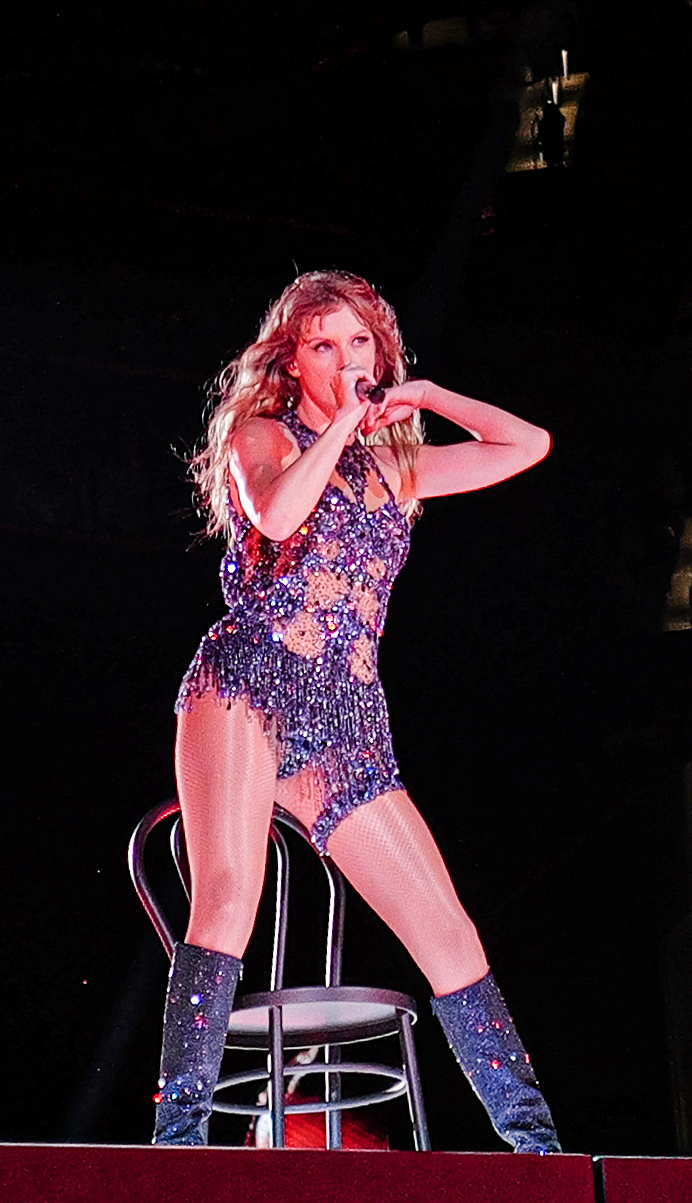
Swift's heightened fame and highly publicized breakups during the Eras Tour influenced The Tortured Poets Department.

The brief fling sends Swift's narrator into a whirlwind of strong emotions blending desire and pain. In "Down Bad", she compares the feelings caused by this short-lived infatuation to being abducted by an extraterrestrial being. "Guilty as Sin?" explores her longing to be intimate with another man while being trapped in an unhappy relationship and the guilt that ensues, comparing her orgasm to death and ocean waves crashing. She declares her devotion to him in "But Daddy I Love Him", and, in "I Can Fix Him (No Really I Can)", is determined to bring out the sweet nature of this problematic man, until she realizes at the end that she could not. The painful ending is the theme of two tracks: "Loml" and "The Smallest Man Who Ever Lived", which both explore the imbalanced dynamic between Swift's narrator and her subject. In "Loml", Swift's narrator is devastated by this "con-man" who falsely promised her marriage and kids but ultimately abandons her, whereas in "The Smallest Man Who Ever Lived", she directs her anger and condemnation towards him, who ghosted her and thus "didn't measure up in any measure of a man", as depicted in the lyrics.

The album's third major theme revolves around Swift's fame and its impact on her, alluding to how she coped with the breakups while having to perform in the public eye. In these songs, which reference her public image and incorporate self-aware and sometimes self-deprecating humor, she confronts anyone who she thought had wronged her: detractors, music-industry executives, the press, and her fans. In "The Tortured Poets Department", which details an impending heartbreak between two musicians, she tells her romantic interest that she is not Patti Smith and he is not Dylan Thomas, both associating with and distancing from the "tortured poet" archetype that the title evokes. In "But Daddy I Love Him", which is set in a religious small town, she criticizes anyone who disapproves of her romance with a troublesome man who may blemish her innocent, good-girl image. Several analyses opined that this was Swift's message to her fans not to interfere with her private life, influenced by their public outcry against her alleged fling with Healy due to his unpopularity.

"Florida!!!", "Who's Afraid of Little Old Me?", and "I Can Fix Him (No Really I Can)" incorporate elements of Southern Gothic melodrama. Both "Florida!!!" and "Who's Afraid of Little Old Me" reflect Swift's anxiety when facing with her fame and identity: "Florida!!!" is an escapist tale about escaping to Florida to reinvent her identity and forget past wrongdoings, while "Who's Afraid of Little Old Me?" details her rage and resentment against the culture that she was brought up in, alluding to her early success when she was still a teenager. In "I Can Do It with a Broken Heart", Swift claims that she could put on a show despite her depression from being abandoned by her romantic interests. The standard edition's penultimate track, "The Alchemy", is about a burgeoning and triumphant romance using American football metaphors—the outlier in an album of heavy emotions. The closing track, "Clara Bow", was named after the 1920s silent-film actress Clara Bow. In it, Swift explores how women in the music industry are consecutively viewed as replacements for someone before them.

=== The Anthology ===
The double album edition of The Tortured Poets Department is subtitled The Anthology and contains 15 additional songs. Swift wrote three by herself—"The Black Dog", "Peter", and "The Manuscript"—ten with Dessner, and two with Antonoff. While the Anthology songs expand on the original edition's themes of heartbreak and emotional tumult, they are less directly autobiographical and use literary subtexts to convey the sentiments via metaphors and character studies.

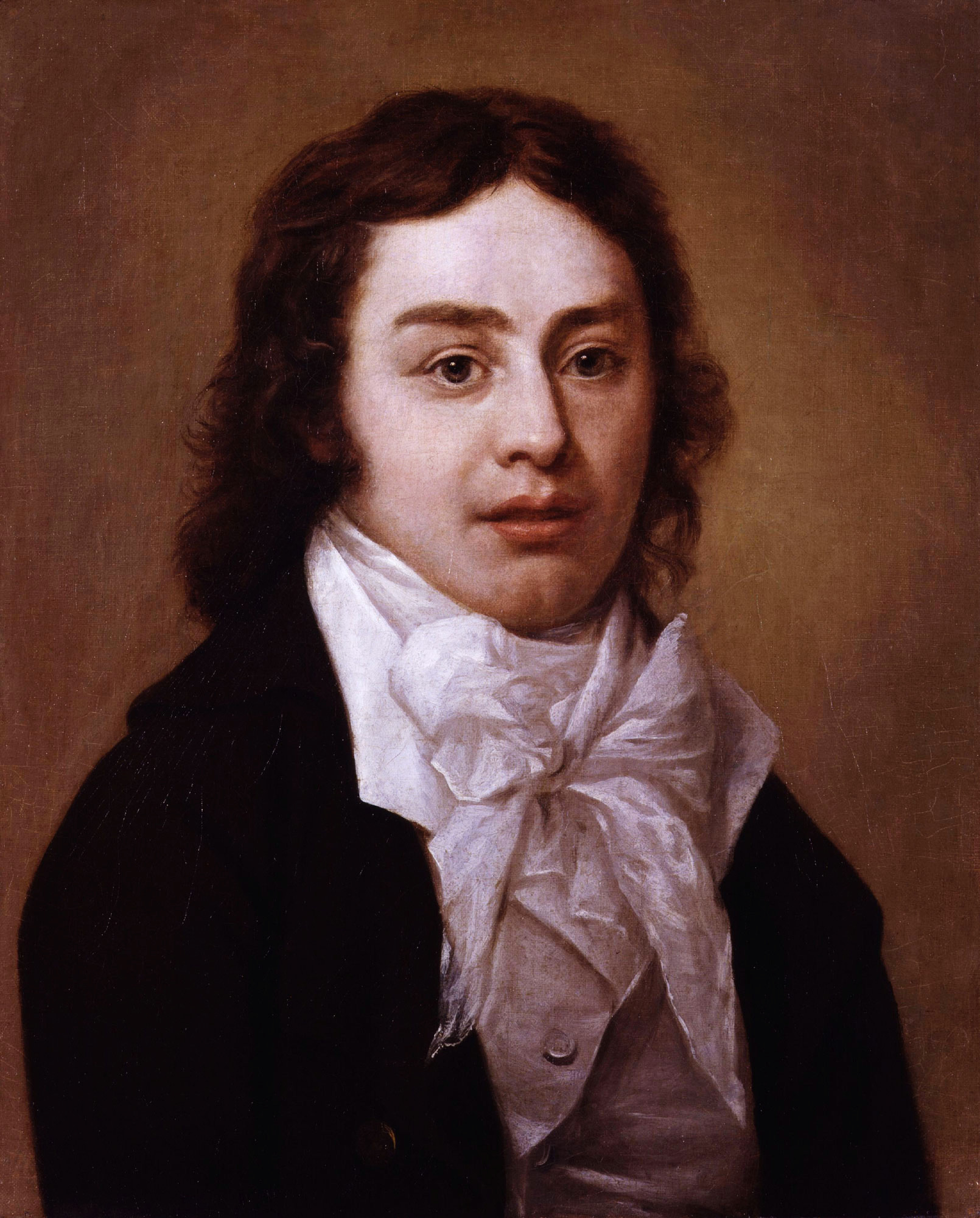
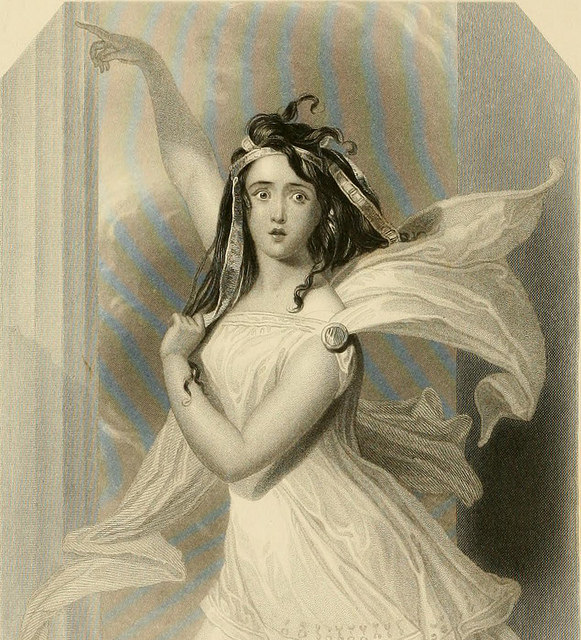
The Anthology contains mythological references, including the albatross metaphor originated in a poem by Samuel Taylor Coleridge (left) and the Greek mythology of Cassandra (right).

Motifs of mythology are prominent in The Anthology. "The Black Dog" and "The Albatross" draw from and reinvent English folklore imagery; the literature academic Matthew J. A. Green commented that they also feature influences of Gothic literature. "The Black Dog" references both a London pub and the mythical creature black dog—Swift's narrator is devastated upon learning that her ex-lover is seducing another woman at the pub and, at the end of the song, compares his act of abandoning her to a dog with its tail between its legs. In "The Albatross", Swift plays with the albatross metaphor originated in Samuel Taylor Coleridge's 1789 poem The Rime of the Ancient Mariner. Her narrator compares herself to the albatross as both a sign of danger and an agent of rescue, shifting from third- to first-person narration in the final chorus. The lyrics are ambiguous; according to the philosopher Georgie Mills, they can be interpreted as either Swift's warning to someone who has wronged her or caution for a potential romantic partner.

Swift similarly switches between first- and third-person storytelling in "Cassandra", a reference to the ancient Greek mythological princess Cassandra, who was a prophetess cursed by the god Apollo so that nobody believed in her prophecies. In the song, Swift's narrator details how the townsfolk murder Cassandra for her foresight, contrary to the original mythology that she is just ignored and not killed; Burt wrote that Swift's "Cassandra" exerts influences from Homer and Virgil. In "The Prophecy", Swift's narrator pleads to a higher being to change her destiny of loneliness and begs for a soulmate. According to Mills, the trope of prophecy evokes mythological tales such as Cassandra and Oedipus, and the lyrics incorporate biblical imagery of Eve being cursed.

The Anthology also features influences from literature. "Peter" is based on the narrative of J. M. Barrie's 20th-century play and novel Peter Pan. Told from the perspective of Wendy Darling, the song depicts her waiting by the window for the day Peter Pan grows up and comes back to her. By the end of the song, in the bridge, she concedes that she has tried in vain and, pleading with Peter Pan to forgive her, extinguishes the candlelight. "The Bolter" was influenced by Nancy Mitford's 1945 novel The Pursuit of Love, about a female character nicknamed "The Bolter", who stays in society's margin and looks for love anywhere and in anyone. In her song, Swift's narrator is an endearing and mischievous woman who finds pleasure in seducing bad men, whom she describes as "trophy hunters", and escaping them at every turn.

Other tracks draw from Swift's self-awareness and fame. In "How Did It End?", her narrator explores anguish over a failed relationship and contemplates how the public's interest in her private life contributes to the distorted reality and gossip that ensue. In "I Hate It Here", her narrator daydreams about escaping to an idealized past, imagining a beautiful landscape of secret gardens, lunar valleys, and gentle people, but she later acknowledges that nostalgia is a trap. "Thank You Aimee" is a sarcastic attack on a high-school bully; Swift's narrator appreciates the bully for making her stronger and tells them that she has changed their name so that they cannot enjoy the attention. The closing track, "The Manuscript", is a re-examination of a long-gone romantic relationship with an older man; while it was once painful, Swift's narrator reflects on it with maturity and acceptance. She ends the song with the line, "The story isn't mine anymore." According to Mills, this lyric refers to the "death of the author"—by relinquishing authorship on her stories, Swift gives way for her audience to collectively construct and own theirs, thus positioning herself as a "modern-day Homer" and turning her songs into folktales.

== Production and music ==
The Tortured Poets Department took two years to complete. Swift recorded and produced with Antonoff at Electric Lady Studios in New York City and Conway Recording Studios in Los Angeles, and with Dessner at Long Pond Studios in the Hudson Valley. "Fresh Out the Slammer", "Florida!!!", and "Who's Afraid of Little Old Me" were additionally recorded at Esplanade Studios in New Orleans; "Florida!!!" also at Miloco Studios in London; and "I Can Fix Him (No Really I Can)" at Rue Boyer Studio A in Paris. On tracks co-produced with Antonoff, his bandmates from Bleachers played and recorded instruments at their respective studios: Zem Audu and Evan Smith on synthesizers, Michael Riddleberger and Sean Hutchinson on drums and percussion, and Mikey Freedom Hart on guitars and keyboards. Swift's vocals were recorded by Laura Sisk at Electric Lady, and by Christopher Rowe at Prime Recording Studio in Nashville. Conducted by Robert Ames, the London Contemporary Orchestra provided string sections consisting of violins, violas, cellos, and double basses, to "Clara Bow" on the standard edition, and nine tracks on The Anthology.

The music of The Tortured Poets Department is minimalist. Compositionally, the songs reprise many elements that had been characteristic of Swift's music: they employ the verse-chorus form largely composed in major scale and set in common time, one-note melodies in the verses that create tensions for more tuneful choruses, and syncopated rhythms and phrasings. Many critics commented that the song structures and instrumental timbres feature influences of country music, a genre that defined her early career; according to Jon Pareles of The New York Times, Swift plays on traditional country songwriting by employing a "choppy pre-chorus, or chorus, that arrives in two-syllable bursts", which accentuates a steady verse structure and brings a "hip-hop percussiveness". Swift sings mostly in the lower ranges of her vocal register, resulting in a rap-like, conversational delivery; the music professor Samuel Murray commented that she reprised many of her common vocal devices, such as one-note melodies and a recitative singing style.

"Fortnight" (featuring Post Malone)
The synth-pop sound of the album's first volume is exemplified by "Fortnight", which features a pulsing synth bassline.

The production styles of Antonoff and Dessner result in two distinct soundscapes. Antonoff's synth-based approach results in mid-tempo synth-pop songs that characterize the standard edition, (Note: As described by Variety's Chris Willman, NME's Laura Molloy, Consequence's Mary Siroky, and The Daily Telegraph's Neil McCormick) with an ambient, electronica soundscape composed of sustained pads and bass, electronic pulses, and sparse, programmed drum machine beats. The compositions incorporate elements of country, rock, pop rock, dream pop, and sophisti-pop. According to music critics, The Tortured Poets Department evokes the pop sounds of Swift's albums Midnights (Note: As described by Rogerson, The Guardian's Alexis Petridis and Laura Snapes, BBC News's Mark Savage, and Rolling Stone's Rob Sheffield) and 1989 (2014), (Note: As discussed by Rogerson, Petridis, and Snapes) but it is more muted and less danceable. Dessner's acoustic arrangements are driven by piano and guitar, resulting in mellow folk-pop and chamber pop ballads that characterize The Anthology, which also infuses elements of soft rock. Critics compared this production style to his collaborations with Swift on her 2020 albums Folklore and Evermore. (Note: As discussed by Savage, The A.V. Club's Mary Kate Carr, The New Yorker's Tyler Foggart, and Exclaim!'s Alex Hudson)

=== Songs ===
The first five tracks of The Tortured Poets Department exemplify the muted synth-pop sound: "Fortnight", "The Tortured Poets Department", "My Boy Only Breaks His Favorite Toys", "Down Bad" and "So Long, London". The first three incorporate influences of 1980s pop on their synth textures; "Fortnight" and "My Boy Only Breaks His Favorite Toys" incorporate an ambient, new wave atmosphere. "Down Bad" features R&B inflections in its dynamic shifts and vocal cadences. "So Long, London" begins with vocal harmonies that resemble a cathedral choir and progresses into an electronic arrangement of trembling, fast-paced synths.

"But Daddy I Love Him"
The instruments and composition of "But Daddy I Love Him" display influences of country and rock—two of the styles that the album incorporates.

The next six tracks feature strong country influences, brought by a twang in their instrumental timbres. "But Daddy I Love Him" combines country, folk rock, and electropop, over amplified snare drums, dynamic strings, and Swift's full voice in her upper register. The reverbed electric guitar in "Fresh Out the Slammer" evokes Americana, while the composition of "Florida!!!"—gentle synths and rhythmic programming in the verses, and loud synths in the choruses, which end with a deep, tremolo electric guitar—situates it within indie rock and arena rock. "Guilty as Sin?" infuses elements of pop rock and 1990s soft rock, accentuated by live drums and melisma vocals. The intricate arrangement of "Who's Afraid of Little Old Me?" resembles orchestral pop: deep layers of dense, galloping synth sequences, grainy Moog bass, and a mix of electric guitar and drums. "I Can Fix Him (No Really I Can)" is instrumented by sparse, tremolo guitars and percussion that sound like gunshots, evoking a Wild West atmosphere and connotations of western music.

The minimalistic piano ballad "Loml" is driven by slow, melancholic piano chord arpeggios and soft vocals, building up with strings towards the end, while "I Can Do It with a Broken Heart" is driven by frantic synth arpeggiators and throbbing bass programming over an upbeat dance-pop, electropop, and disco-pop sound. "The Smallest Man Who Ever Lived" begins as a piano ballad and builds up with a monotone synth sequence and a climactic second part, instrumented with Swift's distorted vocals over eighth-note bass drums and crescendoing orchestral strings. "The Alchemy" is a pop-rock song with uneven textures of electric guitars, sixteenth-note synth sequences, and rhythm and blues-styled acoustic drums, and the minimalist chamber-pop and pop-rock song "Clara Bow" is instrumented with airy, staccato strings and dual bass: one tonic, and one that harmonizes.

The Anthology is more musically uniformed, consisting of five piano ballads ("How Did It End?", "Cassandra", "Peter", "Robin", "The Manuscript"), two piano-led ballads ("The Black Dog", "Chloe or Sam or Sophia or Marcus"), and five guitar ballads propelled by fingerpicking ("I Hate It Here", "Thank You Aimee", "I Look in People's Windows", "The Prophecy", "The Bolter"). There are a few outliers: "Imgonnagetyouback" has a synth-pop production and R&B-influenced vocals, and "So High School" evokes 1990s rock styles such as indie rock and alternative rock. "The Albatross" is a mid-tempo indie folk ballad.

== Release ==
=== Title and artwork ===
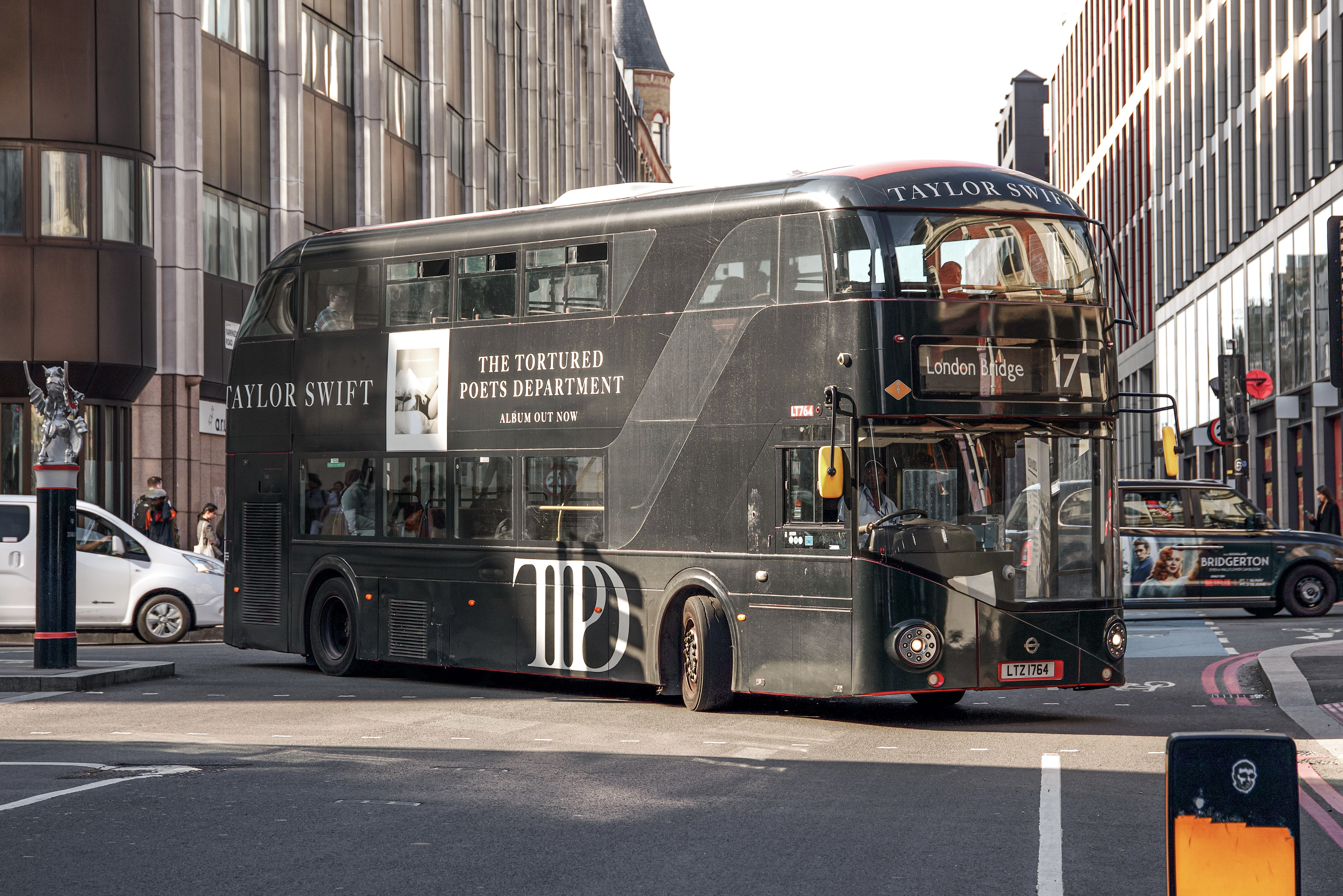
A vinyl-wrapped double decker bus advertising the album in London, May 2024

Commenting on the title The Tortured Poets Department, Burt argued that while this did not turn Swift into a "print-based poet", it showcased her ability to incorporate evocative lyrics into pop songs. The lack of an apostrophe, as in The Tortured Poets' Department, was the subject of a debate in the press over grammatical correctness. Literary scholars commented that the title was grammatically correct: Swift used Tortured Poets as an attributive noun, as in the title of the 1989 film Dead Poets Society, and not as a possessive noun.

Photographed by Beth Garrabrant, the standard cover artwork is a black-and-white glamour photo shot of Swift lying on a bed wearing black loungewear: a see-through Yves Saint Laurent tank top and The Row boy shorts. The black-and-white photoshoot for the album's booklet shows Swift casting her eyes downward while pouting her lips; the English-literature scholar Emily J. Orlando compared Swift's posture to the paintings of the English poet Elizabeth Siddal by Dante Gabriel Rossetti, a fellow poet. Media outlets described the album's visual aesthetic as gothic and dark academia. Both the artwork and title were parodied by numerous brands, organizations, sports teams, and franchises, and inspired numerous internet memes.

=== Promotion and distribution ===
After the Grammy announcement, on February 5, 2024, Swift released the album cover and standard track listing via social media, and made the first physical variant, "The Manuscript", available for pre-order. During the Australian and Singaporean shows of the Eras Tour in February−March 2024, she announced three additional physical editions, each titled after a corresponding bonus track: "The Bolter", "The Albatross", and "The Black Dog". She partnered with Target for an exclusive "Phantom Clear" collector's vinyl LP edition.

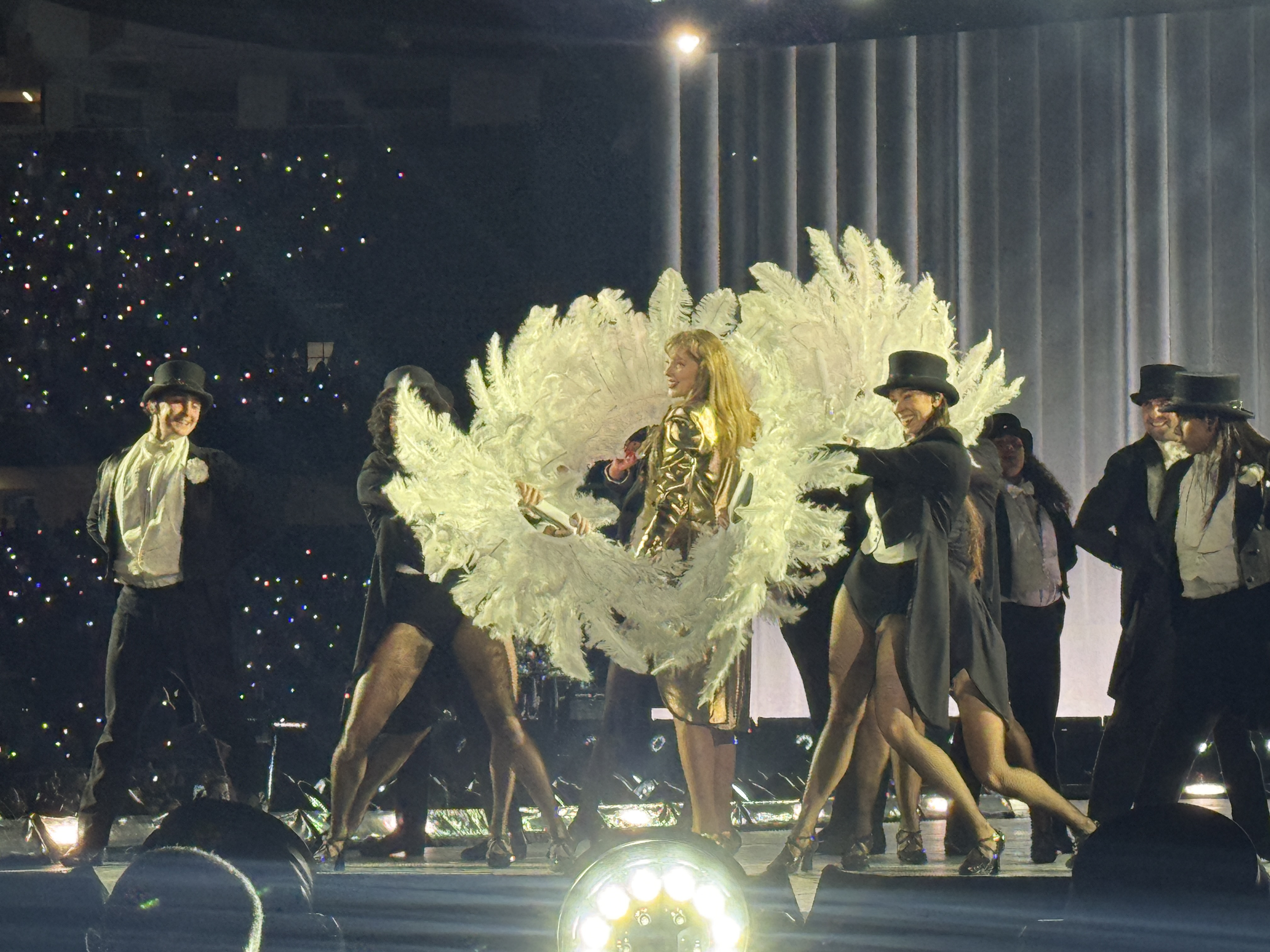
Swift included songs from the album in the Eras Tour's set list in 2024.

Swift promoted The Tortured Poets Department on social media and music streaming platforms, prompting Swifties to search for Easter eggs. On Apple Music, she curated five playlists with each containing her previous songs, inspired by the five stages of grief. Spotify hosted a pop-up library of curated articles at The Grove, Los Angeles; QR code murals in various cities worldwide led to unlisted YouTube shorts on Swift's channel; Instagram included a countdown to the album's release; and Threads added special shimmer effects to hashtags related to Swift and the album. iHeartRadio and SiriusXM announced special programs with exclusive content from Swift to celebrate the album's release; the former temporarily rebranded as "iHeartTaylor".

Via Republic Records, The Tortured Poets Department was released on both physical and digital formats on April 19, 2024; The Anthology was surprise-released on digital platforms two hours later. The album had been leaked two days prior, leading to the phrase "Taylor Swift leak" being temporarily banned from searches on the social media platform X (formerly Twitter). The initial release was supported by 19 physical variants—nine CDs, six vinyl LPs, and four cassettes; all physical copies include a poem by the American singer-songwriter Stevie Nicks, who is referenced in the track "Clara Bow".

From May 2024, starting with the Paris shows, (Note: The said concert technically took place at Paris La Défense Arena in Nanterre, but a preponderance of media outlets reported the location as Paris.) Swift revamped the Eras Tour set list to include songs from The Tortured Poets Department in a new act, which she informally described as "Female Rage the Musical". In line with the album's aesthetics, the set featured black-and-white graphics and Old Hollywood-inspired settings. She recorded live performances of several songs at shows in Sweden, France, and the United Kingdom and released them as bonus tracks on limited-time digital albums via her website, exclusively for customers in the United States. Also released as bonus material were acoustic versions of tracks as part of five limited physical album editions, and "first draft phone" demo recordings as part of four limited digital album variants.

On November 29, 2024, The Anthology was released on vinyl and CD formats exclusively via Target in North America. The physical Anthology album includes four acoustic bonus tracks. The Tortured Poets Department spawned two singles: "Fortnight" was released on April 19, and "I Can Do It with a Broken Heart" on July 2. "Fortnight" debuted atop the Billboard Hot 100, marking Swift's seventh number-one debut and Malone's first, while the top-three entry "I Can Do It with a Broken Heart" spent 31 weeks on the chart, becoming the album's longest-charting song.

== Commercial performance ==
The Tortured Poets Department broke consumption records across all metrics: streaming, physical sales, and digital sales. On Spotify, the album broke the records for the most single-day streams (300 million) and the most single-week streams (the first album to accumulate one billion streams in a single week, doing so in five days). It became the most-streamed album in a single day on Amazon Music and the most-streamed pop album in a single day on Apple Music. Within one week of release, the album amassed 1.76 billion streams globally, an all-time record.

The Tortured Poets Department became the most-streamed album of 2024 on both Spotify and Apple Music. It accumulated 4 million album-equivalent units within its first release week, as reported by Republic Records, and sold 5.6 million copies to become the global best-selling album of 2024, according to the International Federation of the Phonographic Industry. The Guardian commented that the album solidified Swift's status as the biggest pop star of the 21st century, and Billboard wrote that her commercial success was beyond any of her peers. By August 2025, it had sold 11 million equivalent units worldwide.

=== United States ===
In the United States, The Tortured Poets Department accumulated 1.6 million album-equivalent units in four days, selling 700,000 vinyl LPs to break the record for the highest single-week vinyl sales in the digital era. It broke the single-week streaming record of Drake's Scorpion (2018), amassing 799 million on-demand streams in six days. The Tortured Poets Department debuted atop the Billboard 200 with a first-week tally of 2.61 million units, including 1.914 million pure copies and 891.34 million streams. It became Swift's 14th number-one album, tying her with Jay-Z for the most chart toppers among solo artists. All 31 songs from The Anthology debuted on the Billboard Hot 100; Swift became the female artist with the most chart entries in a single week (32, with "Cruel Summer" also charting), the first female artist to have over 50 songs in the top 10 throughout her career, and the first artist to monopolize the top 14 spots in the same week, led by "Fortnight".

Supported by double-digit variants in digital and CD formats, The Tortured Poets Department spent 17 non-consecutive weeks at number one on the Billboard 200. It became the longest-leading chart topper in Swift's career and the first album by a female artist (and third overall) (Note: After Stevie Wonder's Songs in the Key of Life (1976) and Morgan Wallen's One Thing at a Time (2023)) to spend its first 12 weeks atop the chart. Its chart dominance contributed to the number-two peaks of other high-profile albums such as Billie Eilish's Hit Me Hard and Soft, ¥$'s Vultures 2, and Chappell Roan's The Rise and Fall of a Midwest Princess. Topping the Billboard 200 Year-End of 2024, The Tortured Poets Department was the year's most-consumed album across all metrics in the United States, selling 3.491 million pure copies and amassing 6.955 million units. The album was certified eight-times platinum by the Recording Industry Association of America in September 2025, for surpassing eight million album-equivalent units.

=== Other markets ===
In the English-speaking countries, The Tortured Poets Department is Swift's 14th number-one album in New Zealand, where it became the first album to chart nine songs in the top 10 of the singles chart; 14th in Canada, where it broke the record for the highest vinyl sales week in history; 13th in Australia, where it set the records for the most simultaneous entries by a single artist in the top 10, top 50, and top 100 of the singles chart; and 12th in the United Kingdom, tying her with Madonna for the most number-one albums by a woman. In the United Kingdom, the album registered the biggest sales week by any artist in 7 years and by a non-British artist in 18 years, had the biggest vinyl sales week since 1994, and spent 11 weeks atop the chart, becoming the first album by a non-British artist in the 21st century to spend more than 10 weeks at number one. The Tortured Poets Department became the best-selling album of 2024 in all four countries, (Note: Australia; Canada; New Zealand; UK) and it was certified seven-times platinum in Canada, five-times platinum in New Zealand, and triple platinum in Australia and the United Kingdom.

In continental Europe, The Tortured Poets Department reached number one in Austria, Belgium, Denmark, France, Germany, Italy, the Netherlands, Norway, Spain, Sweden, and Switzerland. It became the best seller of 2024 in Austria, Germany, the Netherlands, Spain (a first for a non-Spanish-speaking artist in the 21st century), and Switzerland. In Germany, it registered the highest streaming day for any album and the highest sales week for an international solo artist in seven years. The album was certified triple platinum in Denmark; double platinum in Austria, Belgium, Italy, Poland, Portugal, and Spain; triple gold in Germany; and platinum in the Netherlands and Switzerland. In Brazil, 10 tracks from The Tortured Poets Department debuted on the Brasil Hot 100, and The Anthology was certified diamond.

== Critical reception ==
=== Reviews ===
Professional ratings
Aggregate scores
Source	Rating
AnyDecentMusic?	7.5/10
Metacritic	76/100
Review scores
Source	Rating
AllMusic	3/5 stars
Clash	8/10
The Daily Telegraph	(Note: Neil McCormick from The Daily Telegraph rated the standard edition and The Anthology edition each with a 4/5 rating.)
The Guardian	4/5 stars
The Independent	5/5 stars
NME	3/5 stars
Pitchfork	6.6/10 (Note: Pitchfork critics rated the standard edition 6.6/10 and The Anthology edition 6.0/10.)
Rolling Stone	(Note: Rob Sheffield from Rolling Stone rated the standard edition 5/5 and The Anthology edition 4/5.)
Slant Magazine	3.5/5 stars
The Times	5/5 stars

Upon release, The Tortured Poets Department divided music critics; secondary sources described the critical consensus as either positive or mixed. According to the review aggregator Metacritic, The Tortured Poets Department received "generally favorable reviews" based on a weighted average score of 76 out of 100 from 24 critic scores, while The Anthology received a weighted average score of 69 from six reviews.

A number of critics regarded the album as a landmark in Swift's discography. Reviews from The Independent's Helen Brown, The Arts Desk's Ellie Roberts, The Times' Dan Cairns, PopMatters's Jeffrey Davies, and Will Harris of Q praised the album as one of Swift's most solid outputs, considering the musical composition, vocal stylings, and lyrical tonality as ambitious and tastefully experimental. Others, including Variety's Chris Willman, the i's Ed Power, and The Observer's Kitty Empire, called it a quintessential Swift album containing some of the best songs of her career.

Swift's songwriting was a source of compliment. The Line of Best Fit's Paul Bridgewater dubbed it her most cohesive body of work to date, finding the music sophisticated and the lyricism symbolic. To Ludovic Hunter-Tilney of the Financial Times, the album is a stylistic evolution for Swift, with writing that marks a "characteristically appealing turn" into moody melodrama. Alexis Petridis of The Guardian and Alex Hopper of American Songwriter thought that the album has Swift's wittiest lyrics, featuring nuanced musical choices that show Swift is "willing to take risks in a risk-averse era for pop" and "constantly evolving and pushing her limits", respectively. In a more measured review, Olivia Horn of Pitchfork felt the lyrics did not "distill an overarching emotional truth, tending to smother rather than sting." Others, such as The New York Times' Lindsay Zoladz, Slant Magazine's Jonathan Keefe, and Exclaim!'s Alex Hudson, described some lyrics as weak and overwritten; Hudson claimed that many of its tracks "mistake verbosity for poetry".

The tumultuous mood and unconstrained emotion of the lyrics were also highlighted. Multiple reviews complimented the album's heavy, unfiltered emotion; Clash's Lauren Webb described it as "a spell-binding, toxic, chaotic illustration" of deteriorating mental sanity. Powers opined that The Tortured Poets Department shows Swift's newfound freedom, with a "lack of concern about whether these songs speak to and for anyone but herself". In a similar perspective, rave reviews from Rolling Stone's Rob Sheffield and Variety's Chris Willman described the album as Swift's "gloriously chaotic" and "audacious, transfixing" project, respectively. To Willman, the album combines "cleverness with catharsis". Consequence's Mary Siroky, on the other hand, found this style of lyricism jarring and "outright bizarre" at times, and felt the album was an attempt at self-parody rather than a showcase of Swift's songwriting acumen.

Many critics, including Zoladz, NME's Laura Molloy, and Stereogum's Tom Breihan, argued that Swift and Antonoff's collaboration on The Tortured Poets Department was uninventive due to a sonic similarity to their past collaborations. The New Yorker's Amanda Petrusich rather favored Dessner's input on the album, calling it "gentler, more tender, and more surprising". Horn and BBC News's Mark Savage felt the melodies were sonically monotonous and "staid", but others argued that the minimalistic approach complemented Swift's hyper-personal lyrics; Hopper opined that "Swift's confidence as an artist is at a peak" with The Tortured Poets Department. According to Mary Kate Carr of The A.V. Club, the album is "perfectly good" but arrived at a time when Swift has "nothing to prove" anymore, resulting in a stagnant point in her artistry; this idea was shared by an anonymous, negative Paste review that criticized the album as rushed, hollow, and unrelatable.

=== Year-end lists ===
Select year-end rankings
Critic/Publication	List	Rank	Ref.
Billboard	The 50 Best Albums of 2024	8	
The Daily Telegraph	The 10 Best Albums of 2024	4	
The Independent	The Best Albums of 2024	19	
Los Angeles Times	The 20 Best Albums of 2024	2	
Jon Caramanica (The New York Times)	Best Albums of 2024	16	
People	The Top 10 Albums of 2024	4	
Rolling Stone	The 100 Best Albums of 2024	23	
Time Out	The 25 Best Albums of 2024	25	
The Times	The 25 Best Albums of 2024	10	
Chris Willman (Variety)	Best Albums of 2024	1	

== Legacy ==
Various peer journalists and columnists cross-examined the album's critical reception. Publications considered The Tortured Poets Department a polarizing album; The Ringer's Nathan Hubbard deemed it Swift's most controversial release since Reputation (2017). Journalists from The New York Times and Vox attributed this phenomenon to Swift's heightened fame and associated media overexposure. Paste's anonymous review was singled out by other publications as "scathing"; Sumnima Kandangwa of the South China Morning Post opined that they hid their reviewer's identity because Swifties "can become quite spirited when it comes to protecting their favourite singer". Sputnikmusic published reviews with three different ratings in a short period of time, each lower than the one before; Minh Anh of L'Officiel found this to be a confusing way to rate music. Swift shared the album's positive reviews on her social media, tagging the respective authors, which some considered as a response to Paste and other unfavorable reviews.

A number of commentators opined that the initial reviews demonstrated a flawed approach to mainstream music criticism. Bloomberg News's Jessica Karl wrote that the "lengthy" duration of the album made the reviewers "[stay] up until dawn to finish listening to an album" to publish, contributing to some reviews that were hasty, criticizing both the "exclamation-pointed digs" at Swift in Paste and the "instant classic" review by Rolling Stone. In The Ringer, Nora Princiotti attributed the polarized reviews to the unexpected double album release, and Nathan Hubbard argued that some "cooler-than-thou" critics from sites like The New Yorker, The New York Times, and Paste used Swift's billionaire status to downplay the personal issues she detailed in the album. Karl opined that some "reputable publications" catered to gossip instead of a serious artistic analysis, while Anh highlighted that reviews mentioned aspects of Swift's public image instead of focusing on the music. The New Yorker's Sinéad O'Sullivan asserted that Swift's albums contain multiple layers of self-referential "lore", writing that the unfavorable reviews were due to critics not taking that into account or not allotting enough listening time.

Some early critics of the album recanted and declared they were "hasty" in reviewing it, as per Slate's Chris Molanphy, who opined it has become a "widely agreed point" in later critical commentary that The Tortured Poets Department "grows on you" after more listens; Molanphy stated he liked the album better than he did a week before. CNN's Oliver Darcy said he had judged The Tortured Poets Department quickly, stating that he reviewed it keeping in the mind its mixed critical reception, and found the album overlong and unimpressive in agreement with other critics, but a week later, "after spending more time with the two-hour sonic feast, more methodically touring through its subtleties and nuances, I am ready to declare that it is one of Swift's best works yet." Darcy opined that the album cannot be fully digested at "the speed of TikTok," and criticized reviewers who do not let music albums "marinate" and instead expect "instant satisfaction". People called The Tortured Poets Department Swift's "Most Important Album" and said that it was judged "too soon".

Critics from BBC News, People, and Pitchfork regarded Swift's twelfth studio album, The Life of a Showgirl, as a creative response or an anti-thesis to The Tortured Poets Department. They compared and contrasted the albums' stark differences in genre, length, songwriting style, subject matter, and the overall musical and visual aesthetic, presenting a dichotomy of Swift's "poet" and "showgirl" artistic personas. While promoting The Life of a Showgirl, Swift described The Tortured Poets Department as a "data dump of everything" she experienced in two or three preceding years, dubbing The Life of a Showgirl as a concise and focused record inspired by joy. In 2026, a newly discovered genus of four Australian true bugs were scientifically named as Swiftiephylus in tribute to Swift; one of the species was named Swiftiephylus poetorum in honor of The Tortured Poets Department due to a similar coloring.

== Accolades ==
Awards and nominations
Organization	Year	Category	Result	Ref.
Nickelodeon Kids' Choice Awards	2024	Favorite Album	Nominated	
Los 40 Music Awards	2024	Best International Album	Nominated	
ARIA Music Awards	2024	Best International Artist	Won	
Billboard Music Awards	2024	Top Billboard 200 Album	Won	
RTHK International Pop Poll Awards	2024	Top Album Awards (English)	Won	
NetEase Annual Music Awards	2024	Top English Album	Won	
Grammy Awards	2025	Album of the Year	Nominated	
Grammy Awards	2025	Best Pop Vocal Album	Nominated	
Premios Odeón	2025	Best International Album	Won	
IFPI Awards	2025	Global Album of 2024	Won	
IFPI Awards	2025	Global Sales Album of 2024	Won	
IFPI Awards	2025	Global Streaming Album of 2024	Won	
IFPI Awards	2025	Global Vinyl Album of 2024	Won	
Japan Gold Disc Awards	2025	Album of the Year (Western)	Won	
Japan Gold Disc Awards	2025	Best 3 Albums (Western)	Won	
iHeartRadio Music Awards	2025	Pop Album of the Year	Won	
Gaffa Awards (Denmark)	2025	International Album of the Year	Nominated	
American Music Awards	2025	Album of the Year	Nominated	
American Music Awards	2025	Favorite Pop Album	Nominated	

== Track listing ==
Standard edition
No.	Title	Writer(s)	Producer(s)	Length
1.	"Fortnight" (featuring Post Malone)	Taylor Swift; Jack Antonoff; Austin Post	Swift; Antonoff; Louis Bell^{[a]}	3:48
2.	"The Tortured Poets Department"	Swift; Antonoff	Swift; Antonoff	4:53
3.	"My Boy Only Breaks His Favorite Toys"	Swift	Swift; Antonoff	3:23
4.	"Down Bad"	Swift; Antonoff	Swift; Antonoff	4:21
5.	"So Long, London"	Swift; Aaron Dessner	Swift; Dessner	4:22
6.	"But Daddy I Love Him"	Swift; Dessner	Swift; Dessner; Antonoff	5:40
7.	"Fresh Out the Slammer"	Swift; Antonoff	Swift; Antonoff	3:30
8.	"Florida!!!" (featuring Florence and the Machine)	Swift; Florence Welch	Swift; Antonoff	3:35
9.	"Guilty as Sin?"	Swift; Antonoff	Swift; Antonoff	4:14
10.	"Who's Afraid of Little Old Me?"	Swift	Swift; Antonoff	5:34
11.	"I Can Fix Him (No Really I Can)"	Swift; Antonoff	Swift; Antonoff	2:36
12.	"Loml"	Swift; Dessner	Swift; Dessner	4:37
13.	"I Can Do It with a Broken Heart"	Swift; Antonoff	Swift; Antonoff	3:38
14.	"The Smallest Man Who Ever Lived"	Swift; Dessner	Swift; Dessner	4:05
15.	"The Alchemy"	Swift; Antonoff	Swift; Antonoff	3:16
16.	"Clara Bow"	Swift; Dessner	Swift; Dessner	3:36
Total length:				65:08

The Anthology edition
No.	Title	Writer(s)	Producer(s)	Length
17.	"The Black Dog"	Swift	Swift; Antonoff	3:58
18.	"Imgonnagetyouback"	Swift; Antonoff	Swift; Antonoff	3:42
19.	"The Albatross"	Swift; Dessner	Swift; Dessner	3:03
20.	"Chloe or Sam or Sophia or Marcus"	Swift; Dessner	Swift; Dessner	3:33
21.	"How Did It End?"	Swift; Dessner	Swift; Dessner	3:58
22.	"So High School"	Swift; Dessner	Swift; Dessner	3:48
23.	"I Hate It Here"	Swift; Dessner	Swift; Dessner	4:03
24.	"Thank You Aimee"	Swift; Dessner	Swift; Dessner; Antonoff	4:23
25.	"I Look in People's Windows"	Swift; Antonoff; Patrik Berger	Swift; Antonoff; Berger	2:11
26.	"The Prophecy"	Swift; Dessner	Swift; Dessner	4:09
27.	"Cassandra"	Swift; Dessner	Swift; Dessner	4:00
28.	"Peter"	Swift	Swift; Dessner	4:43
29.	"The Bolter"	Swift; Dessner	Swift; Dessner	3:58
30.	"Robin"	Swift; Dessner	Swift; Dessner	4:00
31.	"The Manuscript"	Swift	Swift; Dessner	3:44
Total length:				122:21

The Anthology physical edition
No.	Title	Writer(s)	Producer(s)	Length
32.	"Fortnight" (featuring Post Malone; acoustic version)	Swift; Antonoff; Post	Swift; Antonoff; Bell^{[a]}	3:49
33.	"Down Bad" (acoustic version)	Swift; Antonoff	Swift; Antonoff	4:18
34.	"But Daddy I Love Him" (acoustic version)	Swift; Dessner	Swift; Dessner; Antonoff	5:37
35.	"Guilty as Sin?" (acoustic version)	Swift; Antonoff	Swift; Antonoff	4:10
Total length:				140:15

=== Notes ===
- ^{^[a]} signifies a vocal producer.
- "Loml" and "Imgonnagetyouback" are stylized in all lowercase.
- "Thank You Aimee" is stylized as "thanK you aIMee" or "thank You aimEe".
- Physical editions of the standard album include either "The Black Dog", "The Albatross", "The Bolter", or "The Manuscript" as a bonus track.

== Personnel ==
Musicians

- Taylor Swift – vocals (all tracks), piano (tracks 3, 17), background vocals (17)
- Jack Antonoff – synthesizers (tracks 1–4, 6–11, 13, 15, 17, 18, 25), programming (1–4, 6–11, 13, 15, 17, 18, 24, 25), drums (1, 3, 4, 7–10, 13, 15, 17, 18, 24), electric guitar (1, 3, 6–11, 15, 17, 24), acoustic guitar (1, 6–9, 11, 17, 18, 25), piano (2, 4, 8, 10, 13, 17, 18), cello (2, 6, 8, 10, 15, 17, 24, 25), background vocals (2, 6, 15, 24), bass (3, 6, 8–11, 17), percussion (1, 4, 7, 9, 11, 13, 15, 18, 24), Mellotron (6, 8, 10, 11, 17), organ (7), Rhodes, vocoder (17), keyboards, Prophet 5 (18)
- Sean Hutchinson – drums (1, 6, 10, 15, 17), percussion (4)
- Post Malone – vocals (track 1)
- Mikey Freedom Hart – acoustic guitar, bass, electric guitar, Hammond B3 (track 2); Mellotron (4), synthesizers (4, 6, 10), percussion (10)
- Evan Smith – synthesizer (tracks 2, 6, 10), saxophone (4)
- Zem Audu – synthesizer (tracks 2, 6, 10), saxophone (4)
- Michael Riddleberger – drums (track 2), percussion (10)
- Aaron Dessner – piano (tracks 5, 10, 12, 16, 19–23, 26–31), synthesizer (5, 12, 14, 16, 19–24, 26–28, 30, 31), drum programming (5, 14, 16, 19–24, 26, 28–30), electric guitar (5, 14, 19–23, 26, 27, 29, 30), acoustic guitar (6, 19, 20, 23, 24, 26, 29), keyboards (12, 19–22, 24, 26–28, 30), bass (14, 16, 20, 22, 28–30), percussion (16, 19, 20, 22–24, 26, 27, 29, 30), mandolin (20, 23, 24), synth bass (21, 22, 24, 27, 31), banjo (23, 24), drums (30)
- Benjamin Lanz – synthesizer (tracks 5, 19–23, 27, 30), trombone (20, 22, 27), sequencer (22)
- Bobby Hawk – strings (tracks 6, 9, 17)
- Emily Jean Stone – oddities (track 8)
- Florence Welch – vocals, drums, percussion, piano (track 8)
- Glenn Kotche – drums, percussion (tracks 12, 16, 19–21, 23, 24, 26, 29, 30); snare drum, vibraphone (27)
- Oli Jacobs – background vocals, percussion, spoken word (track 13)
- James McAlister – synthesizer (tracks 14, 16, 21–23, 26, 27, 30), percussion (14, 16, 23, 26, 27, 29, 30), omnichord (21, 26, 29), drums (14, 21, 22), electric guitar (14, 22), keyboards (16, 21, 26, 27), drum programming (19, 22, 26, 27, 31); acoustic guitar, synth bass (23); zither (26)
- Rob Moose – viola, violin (tracks 12, 14, 20)
- Jason Slota – percussion (track 14)
- Abi Hyde-Smith – cello (tracks 16, 19, 21, 23, 24, 26, 27, 29–31)
- Brian O'Kane – cello (tracks 16, 19, 21, 23, 24, 26, 27, 29–31)
- Max Ruisi – cello (tracks 16, 19, 21, 23, 24, 26, 27, 29–31)
- Reinoud Ford – cello (tracks 16, 19, 21, 23, 24, 26, 27, 29–31)
- Robert Ames – conductor (tracks 16, 19, 21, 23, 24, 26, 27, 29–31)
- Chris Kelly – double bass (tracks 16, 19, 21, 23, 24, 26, 27, 29–31)
- Dave Brown – double bass (tracks 16, 19, 21, 23, 24, 26, 27, 29–31)
- Sophie Roper – double bass (tracks 16, 19, 21, 23, 24, 26, 27, 29–31)
- Elisa Bergersen – viola (tracks 16, 19, 21, 23, 24, 26, 27, 29–31)
- Matthew Kettle – viola (tracks 16, 19, 21, 23, 24, 26, 27, 29–31)
- Morgan Goff – viola (tracks 16, 19, 21, 23, 24, 26, 27, 29–31)
- Nicholas Bootiman – viola (tracks 16, 19, 21, 23, 24, 26, 27, 29–31)
- Akiko Ishikawa – violin (tracks 16, 19, 21, 23, 24, 26, 27, 29–31)
- Cara Laskaris – violin (tracks 16, 19, 21, 23, 24, 26, 27, 29–31)
- Iona Allan – violin (tracks 16, 19, 21, 23, 24, 26, 27, 29–31)
- Kirsty Mangan – violin (tracks 16, 19, 21, 23, 24, 26, 27, 29–31)
- Nicole Crespo O'Donoghue – violin (tracks 16, 19, 21, 23, 24, 26, 27, 29–31)
- Ronald Long – violin (tracks 16, 19, 21, 23, 24, 26, 27, 29–31)
- Sophie Mather – violin (tracks 16, 19, 21, 23, 24, 26, 27, 29–31)
- Dan Oates – violin (tracks 16, 19, 21, 23, 24, 26, 27, 29, 30)
- Eloisa-Fleur Thorn – violin (tracks 16, 19, 21, 23, 24, 26, 27, 29, 30)
- Emily Holland – violin (tracks 16, 19, 21, 23, 24, 26, 27, 29, 30)
- Anna de Bruin – violin (tracks 16, 19, 23, 24, 26, 27, 29–31)
- Galya Bisengalieva – violin (tracks 16, 19, 21, 24, 26, 30)
- Agata Daraskaite – violin (tracks 16, 19, 26, 27, 30)
- Julian Azkoul – violin (tracks 16, 19, 26, 27, 30)
- Amy Swain – viola (tracks 16, 19, 26, 27, 30)
- J.T. Bates – drums (tracks 16, 20, 21, 26)
- Thomas Barlett – synthesizer (tracks 16, 21, 23, 24, 26, 29–31); keyboards, piano (16, 21, 23, 24, 26, 29, 30)
- Marianne Haynes – violin (tracks 16, 21, 23, 24, 29–31)
- Jack Manning – piano (track 18)
- George Barton – percussion (tracks 19, 23, 24, 26, 27, 31), timpani (30)
- David McQueen – French horn (tracks 21, 23, 24, 26, 27, 29–31)
- Alicia Berendse – violin (tracks 21, 24, 29–31)
- Meghan Cassidy – viola (tracks 23, 29, 31)
- Natasha Humphries – violin (tracks 23, 29, 31)
- Jonathan Farey – French horn (tracks 24, 26, 27, 29–31)
- Paul Cott – French horn (tracks 24, 26, 27, 29–31)
- Patrik Berger – acoustic guitar (track 25)
- Max Welford – bass clarinet (tracks 26, 29)
- Vicky Lester – harp (track 30)
- Bryce Dessner – drum programming, piano, synthesizer (track 31)

Technical

- Randy Merrill – mastering
- Ryan Smith – mastering
- Serban Ghenea – mixing
- Bryce Bordone – mix engineering
- Laura Sisk – engineering (tracks 1–4, 6–11, 13, 15, 17, 18, 24, 25), vocal engineering (7, 9, 11, 12, 14, 15)
- Oli Jacobs – engineering (tracks 1–4, 6–11, 13, 15, 17, 18, 24, 25)
- Sean Hutchinson – engineering (tracks 1, 2, 4, 6, 10, 15, 17)
- Michael Riddleberger – engineering (tracks 1, 2, 4, 6, 10, 17)
- David Hart – engineering (tracks 2, 6, 10)
- Evan Smith – engineering (tracks 2, 6, 10)
- Mikey Freedom Hart – engineering (tracks 2, 6, 10)
- Zem Audu – engineering (tracks 2, 6, 10)
- Bella Blasko – engineering (tracks 5, 6, 10, 11, 14, 27, 28, 31), additional engineering (16, 19–24, 26, 29, 30)
- Jonathan Low – engineering (tracks 5, 6, 10, 11, 16, 19–24, 26–30)
- Aaron Dessner – engineering (tracks 5, 14)
- Benjamin Lanz – engineering (tracks 5, 19, 20, 22, 23, 26, 27, 30)
- Ben Loveland – engineering (track 8)
- Joey Miller – engineering (track 10), engineering assistance (13)
- James McAlister – engineering (tracks 14, 16, 19, 21–23, 26, 27, 29, 30)
- Rob Moose – engineering, recording arrangement (track 14)
- Jeremy Murphy – engineering (tracks 16, 19, 21, 23, 24, 26, 27, 29, 30)
- Thomas Bartlett – engineering (tracks 16, 21, 23, 24, 26, 29, 30)
- Maryam Qudus – engineering (tracks 20, 23, 24, 30)
- Jack Antonoff – engineering (track 24)
- Pat Burns – engineering (track 27)
- Louis Bell – vocal engineering (track 1)
- Christopher Rowe – vocal engineering (tracks 7, 9, 11, 12, 15, 20)
- Beau Sorenson – additional engineering (track 14)
- Bryce Dessner – recording arrangement (tracks 16, 19, 21, 23, 24, 26, 27, 29–31)
- Jack Manning – engineering assistance (tracks 1–4, 6–11, 13, 15, 17, 18, 25)
- Jon Sher – engineering assistance (tracks 1–4, 6–11, 13, 15, 17, 18, 25)
- Lauren Marquez – engineering assistance (tracks 1, 13)
- Jesse Snider – engineering assistance (tracks 7, 8, 10)
- Joe Caldwell – engineering assistance (tracks 10, 13, 18, 24)
- Rḗmy Dumelz – engineering assistance (track 11)
- Laura Beck – engineering assistance (tracks 16, 19, 21, 23–27, 29–31)

== Charts ==
=== Weekly charts ===
Weekly chart performance
Chart (2024)	Peak position
Argentine Albums (CAPIF)	1
Australian Albums (ARIA)	1
Austrian Albums (Ö3 Austria)	1
Belgian Albums (Ultratop Flanders)	1
Belgian Albums (Ultratop Wallonia)	1
Canadian Albums (Billboard)	1
Croatian International Albums (HDU)	1
Czech Albums (ČNS IFPI)	1
Danish Albums (Hitlisten)	1
Dutch Albums (Album Top 100)	1
Finnish Albums (Suomen virallinen lista)	2
French Albums (SNEP)	1
German Albums (Offizielle Top 100)	1
Greek Albums (IFPI)	1
Hungarian Albums (MAHASZ)	1
Icelandic Albums (Tónlistinn)	1
Irish Albums (Official Charts)	1
Italian Albums (FIMI)	1
Japanese Combined Albums (Oricon)	4
Japanese Hot Albums (Billboard Japan)	5
Lithuanian Albums (AGATA)	3
New Zealand Albums (RMNZ)	1
Norwegian Albums (VG-lista)	1
Polish Albums (ZPAV)	1
Portuguese Albums (AFP)	1
Scottish Albums (Official Charts)	1
Slovak Albums (ČNS IFPI)	1
South Korean Albums (Circle)	68
Spanish Albums (Promusicae)	1
Swedish Albums (Sverigetopplistan)	1
Swiss Albums (Schweizer Hitparade)	1
UK Albums (Official Charts)	1
US Billboard 200	1

=== Monthly charts ===
Chart (2024)	Position
Japanese Albums (Oricon)	7

=== Year-end charts ===
2024 year-end chart performance
Chart (2024)	Position
Australian Albums (ARIA)	1
Austrian Albums (Ö3 Austria)	1
Belgian Albums (Ultratop Flanders)	1
Belgian Albums (Ultratop Wallonia)	8
Canadian Albums (Billboard)	1
Croatian International Albums (HDU)	3
Danish Albums (Hitlisten)	2
Dutch Albums (Album Top 100)	1
French Albums (SNEP)	9
German Albums (Offizielle Top 100)	1
Hungarian Albums (MAHASZ)	12
Icelandic Albums (Tónlistinn)	26
Italian Albums (FIMI)	16
Japanese Download Albums (Billboard)	78
New Zealand Albums (RMNZ)	1
Polish Albums (ZPAV)	15
Portuguese Albums (AFP)	4
Slovak Albums (ČNS IFPI)	3
Spanish Albums (PROMUSICAE)	1
Swedish Albums (Sverigetopplistan)	9
Swiss Albums (Schweizer Hitparade)	1
UK Albums (OC)	1
US Billboard 200	1

2025 year-end chart performance
Chart (2025)	Position
Australian Albums (ARIA)	15
Austrian Albums (Ö3 Austria)	12
Belgian Albums (Ultratop Flanders)	25
Belgian Albums (Ultratop Wallonia)	167
Canadian Albums (Billboard)	8
Danish Albums (Hitlisten)	59
Dutch Albums (Album Top 100)	39
French Albums (SNEP)	104
German Albums (Offizielle Top 100)	9
New Zealand Albums (RMNZ)	16
Spanish Albums (PROMUSICAE)	43
UK Albums (OC)	26
US Billboard 200	6
US Top Album Sales	2

== Certifications ==
Certifications and sales
Region	Certification	Certified units/sales
Australia (ARIA)	3× Platinum	210,000^{‡}
Austria (IFPI Austria)	2× Platinum	30,000^{‡}
Belgium (BRMA)	2× Platinum	40,000^{‡}
Brazil (Pro-Música Brasil)	3× Platinum	120,000^{‡}
Brazil (Pro-Música Brasil) The Anthology	Diamond	160,000^{‡}
Canada (Music Canada)	7× Platinum	560,000^{‡}
Denmark (IFPI Danmark)	3× Platinum	60,000^{‡}
France (SNEP)	2× Platinum	200,000^{‡}
Germany (BVMI)	3× Gold	225,000^{‡}
Italy (FIMI)	2× Platinum	100,000^{‡}
Netherlands (NVPI)	Platinum	37,200^{‡}
New Zealand (RMNZ)	5× Platinum	75,000^{‡}
Poland (ZPAV)	2× Platinum	40,000^{‡}
Portugal (AFP)	2× Platinum	14,000^{‡}
Spain (Promusicae)	2× Platinum	80,000^{‡}
Switzerland (IFPI Switzerland)	Platinum	20,000^{‡}
United Kingdom (BPI)	3× Platinum	900,000^{‡}
United States (RIAA)	8× Platinum	8,000,000^{‡}
^{‡} Sales+streaming figures based on certification alone.

== Release history ==
Release dates and formats
Initial release date	Edition(s)	Format(s)	Ref.
April 19, 2024	Standard	Digital download; streaming	
April 19, 2024	The Manuscript; The Bolter; The Albatross; The Black Dog	CD; vinyl LP; cassette	
April 19, 2024	The Anthology	Digital download; streaming	
May 8, 2024	Acoustic Version: "But Daddy I Love Him"	Limited-time CD	
May 17, 2024	First Draft Phone Memo: "Cassandra"; "Who's Afraid of Little Old Me?"; "The Black Dog"	Limited-time download	
May 23, 2024	Live From Paris	Limited-time download	
June 1, 2024	Acoustic Version: "Down Bad"; "Guilty as Sin?"	Limited-time CD	
June 10, 2024	Acoustic Version: "Fortnight"; "Fresh Out the Slammer"	Limited-time CD	
June 13, 2024	Live From Paris; First Draft Phone Memo: "Cassandra"; "Who's Afraid of Little Old Me?"; "The Black Dog"	Limited-time download	
July 11, 2024	Live From Stockholm	Limited-time download	
August 3, 2024	First Draft Phone Memo: "My Boy Only Breaks His Favorite Toys"	Limited-time download	
August 8, 2024	Live From London; Live From Dublin; Live From Edinburgh; Live From Cardiff	Limited-time download	
August 15, 2024	Live From London; Live From Lyon	Limited-time download	
November 29, 2024	The Anthology	CD; vinyl LP	
