= Loml =

2024 song by Taylor Swift

Song by Taylor Swift

from the album The Tortured Poets Department
- Released: April 19, 2024
- Studio: Long Pond (New York)
- Length: 4:37
- Label: Republic
- Songwriters: Taylor Swift; Aaron Dessner
- Producers: Taylor Swift; Aaron Dessner

Lyric video
- "Loml" on YouTube

"Loml" (stylized in all lowercase) is a song by the American singer-songwriter Taylor Swift from her eleventh studio album, The Tortured Poets Department (2024). Written and produced by Swift and Aaron Dessner, it is a soft, melancholic piano-led ballad. The song's lyrics mourn the loss of a long-lived relationship that leaves a long-lasting mark, using extensive imagery related to death such as phantoms, graveyards, and the Holy Ghost. Whereas "Loml" is a popular initialism of "love of my life", the conclusion of the song denotes it as "loss of my life".

Music critics acclaimed the emotional songwriting with its heart-wrenching lyrics and the simple yet evocative production of "Loml". Several reviews picked the song as an album highlight. The track peaked at number 16 on the Billboard Global 200 and reached the top 20 on charts in Australia, Canada, New Zealand, the Philippines, and the United States. Swift performed the song live three times on the Eras Tour in 2024.

== Background and release ==
Swift developed her eleventh studio album, The Tortured Poets Department, "for about two years" after finishing her previous album, Midnights (2022). Conceived amidst publicized reports on Swift's personal life, including a breakup with the English actor Joe Alwyn and a brief romantic linking with the English musician Matty Healy, The Tortured Poets Department was described by her as a "lifeline" album which she "really needed" to make. Republic Records released The Tortured Poets Department on April 19, 2024; "Loml" is track 12 out of the 16 tracks of the standard edition.

Swift performed "Loml" live for the first time on May 9, 2024, during the first Paris show of the Eras Tour. A digital variant of The Tortured Poets Department containing a recorded version of this performance was released on May 24. She performed "Loml" live again twice, as part of piano mashups with "Don't You" (2021) at the concert in Munich, Germany, on July 28, and with "White Horse" (2008) at the concert in Miami, United States, on October 19, 2024.

== Music and lyrics ==
"Loml"
"Loml" is instrumented by a simple piano arrangement, letting Swift's voice deliver the narrative lyrics of a devastating failed relationship that was once hopeful.

Swift wrote and produced "Loml" with Aaron Dessner, who played synth bass, keyboards, piano, and synthesizers on the track. Bella Blasko and Jonathan Low recorded the song at Long Pond Studios in the Hudson Valley. Swift's lead vocals were recorded by Laura Sisk at Electric Lady Studios, New York, and Christopher Rowe at Prime Recording Studios, Nashville. "Loml" was mixed by Serban Ghenea at MixStar Studios, Virginia Beach. At 4 minutes and 37 seconds long, "Loml" is a piano-led ballad with a minimal production featuring Swift's vocals accompanied by piano keys, evoking an intimate and melancholic soundscape. There were comparisons of the production style of "Loml" to that on Swift's 2020 albums Folklore and Evermore. Rob Sheffield of Rolling Stone specifically compared the piano melody to that from the title track of Evermore.

The lyrics of "Loml" recount a failed romantic relationship that was once full of promises and hopes but ended in devastation, using extensive death-related imagery of phantoms, the Holy Ghost, and graveyards. The track begins with Swift's narrator recalling that this relationship started from "rekindled flames" that were "never quite buried". She and the love interest got back together after being distant for a while, patching up the "memories of the time [she] was away", telling themselves, "We were just kids, babe." Swift's narrator tells herself that she sacrificed her passionate feelings in hopes of stability in this romance: "I thought I was better safe than starry-eyed." In return, this romantic partner tells her that she is the "love of [his] life" multiple times.

The more time she spends in this connection, the more false promises the partner makes; she describes herself as a "fool" and him as a "con-man" who sold her "a get-love-quick scheme", and he offers hopes of marriage, children, and being with her forever. As the song progresses, Swift's narrator realizes all the promises she was given turned out to be false. In the bridge, she details how her romantic partner got drunk one time and "shit-talked [her] under the table, talking rings and talking cradles". She could not help but feel like the whole romance was an illusion, leaving her shattered: "Dancing phantoms on the terrace/ Are they second-hand embarrassed/ That I can't get out of bed, 'cause something counterfeit's dead." Before the final refrain, she reflects on how quickly this romance ended: "It was legendary/ It was momentary/ It was unnecessary/ Should've let it stay buried."

Towards the song's concluding remarks, Swift's narrator is left with intense feelings of disappointment and sadness from what happened. She describes her love interest as a "lion" with a "valiant roar" but also a "coward" that gave her a "bland goodbye". She then comes to terms with what happened, looking back at his words: "'I'll never leave'/ 'Never mind'." In the final words, she mourns what could have been: "You're the loss of my life", a twist on the title "Loml", which is a popular colloquialism for "love of my life".

Annie Zaleski sums up the core message as a realization that "an old flame is best left extinguished". Laura Snapes of The Guardian viewed the lyrical style of "Loml" as "digressive [and] detailed", reminiscent of Swift's 2012 song "All Too Well". Business Insider's Callie Ahlgrim drew parallels between the graveyard imagery of "Loml" with that from Swift's 2020 track "The 1"; "digging up the grave another time." Alex Hopper of American Songwriter also pointed out other possible references to Swift's past songs: the fated love depicted in "Invisible String" (2020) and the difficulty of moving on in "Hits Different" (2022).

== Critical reception ==
"Loml" was picked as a standout from The Tortured Poets Department in many album reviews. Critics acclaimed the emotional songwriting that they found resonant and affecting. Ryan Fish of The Hollywood Reporter called "Loml" the album's most emotional track, and The A.V. Club's and Uproxx's Josh Kurp were impressed by the lyrical twist on the phrase "loml". Ahlgrim said that "Loml" was the only song from the album that made her cry; she admired its "painful precision" in capturing a love that burns intensely then extinguishes quickly.

Several critics highlighted different lyrics as their favorite. Paste, Rob Sheffield of Rolling Stone, and Laura Snapes of The Guardian singled out the line "A con man sells a fool a get-love-quick scheme" as a standout; the former also picked the lyric, "And all at once, the ink bleeds." The Daily Telegraph's Poppie Platt was specifically moved by the "devastating" bridge, while Beats Per Minute's John Wohlmacher lauded the final refrain; "What a valiant roar/ What a bland goodbye/ The coward claimed he was a lion", saying the track contains some of the strongest writing on the album. In a less enthusiastic review by Olivia Horn of Pitchfork, "Loml" failed to deliver the emotions it was supposed to do, because there was "no hierarchy of tragic detail [...] to distill an overarching emotional truth, tending to smother rather than sting".

Other reviewers also praised the production and Swift's vocals. Paste complimented "Loml" for relying on Swift's voice and "a lone piano" to deliver the lyrics effectively. Wohlmacher agreed, saying the "minimal and suggestive" instrumental made room for an intricate narrative. Neil McCormick in The Daily Telegraph was moved by the sorrow and brooding soundscape and Swift's "fantastic singing" that made the emotions palpable, an idea corroborated by Melissa Ruggieri of USA Today, who thought that her vocals contained an ache that would make listeners "feel raked over with nails". Teen Vogue's Claire P. Dodson highlighted the moment that Swift's voice "nearly breaks" when she sings: "the coward claimed he was a lion." In a review for Exclaim!, Alex Hudson upheld "Loml" as the only track from the standard album that most evokes "an affecting breakup postmortem".

"Loml" has appeared on some rankings of Swift's entire catalog. Placing the song at number 21 on his list of 75 best songs by Swift, Variety's Chris Willman said that it contained some of her best lyrics by stacking "one gut punch after another". Ranking all of her 274 songs up until April 2024, Sheffield included "Loml" at the 33rd place; he said that the song "hits home" because of its ordinary and "unmelodramatic" qualities and that it peaked with a "perfectly simple epitaph": "It was legendary/ It was momentary." Ahlgrim included "Loml" in her list of the 15 best breakup songs by Swift; she deemed it accomplished in portraying heartbreak with evocative details, transforming the sentiments "from emotional to harrowing".

== Commercial performance ==
When The Tortured Poets Department was released, tracks from the album occupied the top 14 of the US Billboard Hot 100; "Loml" debuted and peaked at number 12 on the chart, where Swift became the first artist to monopolize the top 14. In Australia, the song reached number 15 on the ARIA Singles Chart and made her the artist with the most entries in a single week with 29; it was certified platinum by the Australian Recording Industry Association. Elsewhere, "Loml" peaked at number 16 on the Billboard Global 200 and reached the top 20 in Philippines (19), Malaysia (19), Canada (17), and New Zealand (16). The song received a gold certification from the British Phonographic Industry (BPI).

== Personnel ==
Credits are adapted from the liner notes of The Tortured Poets Department.

- Taylor Swift – lead vocals, songwriter, producer
- Aaron Dessner – producer, songwriter, bass synth, keyboards, piano, synthesizers
- Bella Blasko – recording, drums, percussion
- Bryce Bordone – mix engineer
- Serban Ghenea – mixing
- Glenn Kotche – drums, percussion
- Jonathan Low – recording
- Christopher Rowe – lead vocals recording
- Laura Sisk – lead vocals recording

== Charts ==
Chart (2024)	Peak position
Australia (ARIA)	15
Canada Hot 100 (Billboard)	17
France (SNEP)	120
Global 200 (Billboard)	16
Greece International (IFPI)	31
Malaysia International (RIM)	19
New Zealand (Recorded Music NZ)	16
Philippines (Billboard)	19
Portugal (AFP)	30
Spain (Promusicae)	97
Sweden (Sverigetopplistan)	55
Swiss Streaming (Schweizer Hitparade)	37
UK Streaming (OCC)	20
US Billboard Hot 100	12

== Certifications ==
Certifications for "Loml"
Region	Certification	Certified units/sales
Australia (ARIA)	Platinum	70,000^{‡}
Brazil (Pro-Música Brasil)	2× Platinum	80,000^{‡}
New Zealand (RMNZ)	Gold	15,000^{‡}
United Kingdom (BPI)	Gold	400,000^{‡}
^{‡} Sales+streaming figures based on certification alone.
