= How Did It End? =

2024 song by Taylor Swift

Song by Taylor Swift

from the album The Tortured Poets Department: The Anthology
- Released: April 19, 2024
- Studio: Long Pond (Hudson Valley, New York); Kitty Committee (Los Angeles); Thomas Bartlett's home studio (Paris)
- Length: 3:58
- Label: Republic
- Songwriters: Taylor Swift; Aaron Dessner
- Producers: Taylor Swift; Aaron Dessner

Lyric video
- "How Did It End?" on YouTube

"How Did It End?" is a song by the American singer-songwriter Taylor Swift from the double album edition of her eleventh studio album, The Tortured Poets Department: The Anthology (2024). Written and produced by Swift and Aaron Dessner, "How Did It End?" is a melancholy piano ballad instrumented by insistent piano arpeggios and a surging string section towards the end. Using death-related imagery, its lyrics detail the aftermath of a broken relationship: the narrator expresses her anguish over others' prying into the cause of her romantic failure and her own unawareness of how it unraveled.

Swift performed "How Did It End?" live twice on the Eras Tour in 2024. Music critics generally praised the song's somber tone and melancholic lyricism, and several have listed it among Swift's best breakup songs. The Independent selected it as one of the best songs of 2024. The track peaked at number 36 on the Billboard Global 200 chart, reached the top 10 in Sweden, and reached the top 40 in Australia, Canada, New Zealand, and the US.

== Background and release ==
The American singer-songwriter Taylor Swift conceived her eleventh studio album, The Tortured Poets Department, amidst heightened fame brought by the Eras Tour, and publicized personal relationships, including the end of a six-year relationship with the English actor Joe Alwyn and an alleged short-lived romantic linking with the English musician Matty Healy. Swift stated that the album took two years for her to complete, describing the songwriting process as a "lifeline" for her to cope with such tumultuous times. The Tortured Poets Department was released on April 19, 2024; a double album edition subtitled The Anthology was surprise-released two hours after the standard edition.

"How Did It End?" is featured on The Anthology, being track number 21 on the album. Swift performed the song as a "surprise song" twice on the Eras Tour in 2024. Her first performance of the song was on piano at the third Stockholm concert on May 19, 2024, and her second was as part of a mashup with "You're Losing Me" (2023) at the sixth Toronto concert on November 23, 2024.

== Music and lyrics ==
Swift wrote and produced "How Did It End?" with Aaron Dessner. The track was recorded at Long Pond Studio in Hudson Valley, New York; Kitty Committee Studio, Los Angeles, California; and Thomas Bartlett's home studio in Paris, France. Jonathan Low and Bella Blasko served as principal recording engineers, with James Rand assisting. The song was mixed by Serban Ghenea at MixStar Studios in Virginia Beach, Virginia, and mastered by Randy Merrill at Sterling Sound in Edgewater, New Jersey. "How Did It End?" is a somber orchestral piano ballad set in a waltz-like arrangement, driven by insistent piano arpeggios, with different chord progressions for the verses and the refrains. The production also incorporates reverbed electric guitars and synths, and a string section that crescendos towards the end, conducted by Robert Ames and played by the London Contemporary Orchestra.

In the lyrics, Swift's narrator dissects the aftermath of a failed relationship and expresses her anguish and exhaustion at others' prying into her breakup. Even though bystanders have come up with their own conclusions, the narrator ends the song claiming that she is unaware of how her relationship ended. In the first verse, she uses the pronoun "we" to examine what went wrong between her and the ex-partner; the opening line goes: "We hereby conduct this postmortem." She is aware of the reason for why it ended herself; "He was a hothouse flower to my outdoorsman." Although they want to keep this breakup private, the news soon spreads to the "empathetic hunger" of their friends, which the narrator is fully aware: "Come one, come all / It's happening again."

In the second verse, the news reaches the friends' cousins, and then the people of the town. She knows that this gossip is inevitable and wonders to herself what bystanders are saying about her breakup: "Guess who we ran into at the shops? / Walking in circles like she was lost / Didn't you hear? / They called it all off." The narrator becomes weary of the talks surrounding her, ultimately surrendering to them; the lyrics use extensive death imagery to describe her paranoia and disbelief: "Say it once again with feeling / How the death rattle breathing / Silenced as the soul was leaving / The deflation of our dreaming / Leaving me bereft and reeling / My beloved ghost and me / Sitting in a tree / D-Y-I-N-G." The song displays a mix of emotions, including grief, anger, confusion, insecurity, and ultimately resignation.

== Critical reception ==
"How Did It End?" received generally positive critical reviews for its somber tone and melancholic message. Reviewers praised Swift's ability to articulate the complex and often painful emotions associated with a breakup, particularly the intrusive nature of public speculation. The song's narrative, detailing the slow decay of a relationship and subsequent public dissection, was noted for its raw honesty and relatability. Billboard ranked the lyric, "Come one come all, it's happening again/ The empathetic hunger descends/ We'll tell no-one except all of our friends/ We must know, how did it end?" as one of the 13 best lyrics on The Tortured Poets Department. The Observer's Kitty Empire noted that the sparse, piano-driven arrangement was seen as a strength of the song. The Independent selected "How Did It End?" as one of the best songs of 2024. Variety ranked it 11th out of the 75 best songs of Swift.

== Personnel ==
Credits are adapted from the liner notes of The Tortured Poets Department: The Anthology.

- Taylor Swift – lead vocals, songwriter, producer
- Aaron Dessner – songwriter, producer, drum programming, electric guitar, keyboards, piano, synthesizer, synth bass
- Serban Ghenea – mixing
- Bryce Bordone – engineer
- Jonathan Low – recording engineer
- Bella Blasko – recording engineer
- James McAlister – drums, drum programming, recording, electric guitar, synthesizer
- Thomas Bartlett – piano, keyboards, synthesizer, recording
- Glenn Kotche – drums, percussion
- JT Bates – drums
- Robert Ames – conductor
- Elisa Bergersen – viola
- Matthew Kettle – viola
- Morgan Goff – viola
- Nicholas Bootiman – viola
- Abi Hyde-Smith – cello
- Brian O’Kane – cello
- Max Ruisi – cello
- Reinoud Ford – cello
- Chris Kelly – double bass
- Dave Brown – double bass
- Sophie Roper – double bass
- David McQueen – French horn
- Akiko Ishikawa – violin
- Alicia Berendse – violin
- Anna de Bruin – violin
- Cara Laskaris – violin
- Dan Oates – violin
- Eloisa-Fleur Thom – violin
- Emily Holland – violin
- Galya Bisengalieva – violin
- Iona Allan – violin
- Kirsty Mangan – violin
- Marianne Haynes – violin
- Nicole Crespo O’Donoghue – violin
- Ronald Long – violin
- Sophie Mather – violin
- Laura Beck – assistant recording engineer
- Randy Merrill – mastering

== Charts ==
Weekly chart performance
Chart (2024)	Peak position
Australia (ARIA)	30
Canada Hot 100 (Billboard)	35
Global 200 (Billboard)	36
Greece International (IFPI)	70
New Zealand (Recorded Music NZ)	38
Portugal (AFP)	100
Sweden Heatseeker (Sverigetopplistan)	8
UK Singles Sales (OCC)	84
UK Streaming (OCC)	44
US Billboard Hot 100	35

== Certifications ==
Certification
Region	Certification	Certified units/sales
Australia (ARIA)	Gold	35,000^{‡}
Brazil (Pro-Música Brasil)	Platinum	40,000^{‡}
New Zealand (RMNZ)	Gold	15,000^{‡}
^{‡} Sales+streaming figures based on certification alone.
