= The Smallest Man Who Ever Lived =

2024 song by Taylor Swift

Song by Taylor Swift

from the album The Tortured Poets Department
- Released: April 19, 2024
- Studio: Long Pond (Hudson Valley); Tiny Telephone (Oakland)
- Length: 4:05
- Label: Republic
- Songwriters: Taylor Swift; Aaron Dessner
- Producers: Taylor Swift; Aaron Dessner

Lyric video
- "The Smallest Man Who Ever Lived" on YouTube

"The Smallest Man Who Ever Lived" is a song by the American singer-songwriter Taylor Swift from her eleventh studio album, The Tortured Poets Department (2024). She wrote and produced it with Aaron Dessner. Described as a breakup song and a diss track, it begins as a simplistic piano ballad that features blinking programming before assuming a rock sound with distorted vocals in the bridge. The lyrics describe a man who flaunts the narrator then ghosts her and attempts to buy drugs from her acquaintance.

Music critics lauded "The Smallest Man Who Ever Lived" for its intense lyricism; several picked the song as a highlight from the album and one of the best songs in Swift's discography. It reached number 18 on the Billboard Global 200 and the top 20 on the national charts of Australia, Canada, Ireland, New Zealand, and the United States. The song received certifications in Australia, Brazil, New Zealand, and the United Kingdom. Swift included it in the revamped set list for the 2024 shows of the Eras Tour (2023–2024).

== Background and release ==
Taylor Swift announced her eleventh studio album, The Tortured Poets Department, at the 66th Annual Grammy Awards on February 4, 2024. She began conceiving it immediately after submitting her previous album, Midnights (2022), and continued working on the record throughout 2023. She described it as a "lifeline" for her and an album that she felt was important to make. "The Smallest Man Who Ever Lived" is the fourteenth track on The Tortured Poets Department, which was released by Republic Records on April 19, 2024.

Swift included "The Smallest Man Who Ever Lived" in the revamped set list of her sixth concert tour, the Eras Tour (2023–2024), starting with the May 2024 shows in Paris. During the performance, she donned a white military jacket and performed a synchronized march across the stage for the song's bridge, with her backup dancers as a drumline. Swift ended the performance by collapsing on the floor along with the marching band.

== Production ==
Swift wrote and produced "The Smallest Man Who Ever Lived" with Aaron Dessner, who recorded it in Biarritz, France, and played bass guitar, electric guitar, piano, and synthesizers. The track was additionally recorded by Bella Blasko at Long Pond Studio in the Hudson Valley, and by Beau Sorenson at Tiny Telephone Studio in Oakland, California, while Laura Sisk recorded Swift's vocals. It was mixed by Serban Ghenea at Mixstar Studios in Virginia Beach, Virginia, and mastered by Randy Merrill at Sterling Sound Studios in Edgewater, New Jersey; Bryce Bordone worked as the mixing engineer. Rob Moose played violin and viola; James McAlister played drums, electric guitar, percussion, and synthesizers; and Jason Slota played percussion.

== Music and lyrics ==
"The Smallest Man Who Ever Lived"
"The Smallest Man Who Ever Lived" shifts from an understated piano ballad to a rock–inspired klang in the bridge, which features Swift's distorted vocals.

"The Smallest Man Who Ever Lived" is four minutes and five seconds long, built on a time signature of 7/4 in the verses and chorus before switching to a 4/4 time signature in the bridge. Music journalists identified it as a breakup song and a provocative diss track addressed to an unnamed ex-lover. "The Smallest Man Who Ever Lived" is divided into two distinct parts; the first part is an understated ballad built around piano and blinking programming, and the second part is a provocative one-chord bridge that features a rock–inspired klang. Swift audibly sighs several times during the song, sings in the bottom range of her alto in the verses, and her voice distorts upon entering the bridge.

The lyrics describe a man in a "Jehovah's Witness suit", who shows the narrator off then ghosts her and attempts to buy drugs from her distant friend. She bombards the subject with a series of questions in the bridge: "Were you sent by someone who wanted me dead?/ Did you sleep with a gun underneath our bed?/ Were you writing a book?/ Were you a sleeper cell spy?/ In 50 years will all this be declassified and you'll confess why you did it?" The bridge employs several references to espionage, ultimately concluding that "it wasn't sexy once it wasn't forbidden".

Several music journalists, along with some of Swift's fans, speculated that the song was written about the singer-songwriter Matty Healy, with whom Swift had a publicized romantic relationship in 2023. This was due to perceptions of his height, reported history of substance abuse, and a signature suit and tie he often donned during his performances. (Note: Attributed to Harper's Bazaar's Joel Calfee, Glamour UK's Lian Brooks, Q's Will Harris, Capital's Tiasha Debray, The Observer's Kitty Empire, The Hollywood Reporter's Ryan Fish, Elle's Lauren Puckett-Pope and Erica Gonzales, and Variety's William Earl and Chris Willman) Ludovic Hunter-Tilney of the Financial Times argued such speculation "miss[ed] the point" of Swift's work. Healy's aunt, Debbie Dedes, reportedly acknowledged that he was the subject of the song and "he will not be surprised" by it.

== Critical reception ==
Several music critics picked "The Smallest Man Who Ever Lived" as a highlight from The Tortured Poets Department and one of the best songs in Swift's discography. Jason Lipshutz from Billboard named it the best song on the album and its centerpiece track, and Ryan Fish from The Hollywood Reporter deemed it a standout track and "the cruelest and most direct Swift has ever been". Mary Siroky of Consequence and Callie Ahlgrim of Business Insider both similarly considered the song a highlight from The Tortured Poets Department. Caroline Darney from USA Today selected it as the sixth-best track on the album and opined that the bridge was the best in Swift's discography. Nate Jones of Vulture considered it the 30th best song in her discography in 2024; he and Lindsay Zoladz of The New York Times both named it her best breakup song since "All Too Well" (2012).

Other critics highlighted the song's intense lyrics and delivery. Chris Willman of Variety placed "The Smallest Man Who Ever Lived" at number 25 in his 2024 ranking of the 75 best songs by Swift, considering it her most scarring song since "Dear John" (2010) and praising its "epic" bridge. Rob Sheffield of Rolling Stone opined that the song could be retitled "The Angriest Song I'll Ever Write" for its heated interrogation-style questions and considered it a new perspective of her previous work. Hunter-Tilney lauded the song as a "quietly venomous piano assassination". The Nation's Stephanie Burt similarly deemed it "the harshest, most dismissive, most condemnatory song that Swift has ever written". Lauren Webb from Clash praised the track's "unrestrained bitterness", and Will Harris from Q described it as a "vulnerable attack to the heartstrings". Alex Hopper of American Songwriter regarded the lyric "'Cause it wasn't sexy once it wasn't forbidden" as a standout on The Tortured Poets Department.

== Commercial performance ==
"The Smallest Man Who Ever Lived" reached number 18 on the Billboard Global 200 chart dated May 4, 2024. It debuted at number 14 in the United States, making Swift the first artist to monopolize the top 14 of the Billboard Hot 100 chart. In the United Kingdom, the track peaked at number 17 on the Audio Streaming chart and number 76 on the Singles Downloads chart. "The Smallest Man Who Ever Lived" additionally reached the national charts of Australia (16), New Zealand (17), Canada (18), Ireland (19), Greece (28), Portugal (31), and Sweden (60). The track was certified platinum in Australia and Brazil, and gold in New Zealand and the United Kingdom.

== Personnel ==
Credits are adapted from the liner notes of The Tortured Poets Department.

- Taylor Swift – vocals, songwriter, producer
- Aaron Dessner – producer, songwriter, recording engineer, drum machine programming, bass guitar, electric guitar, piano, synthesizers
- Bella Blasko – recording engineer
- Beau Sorenson – recording engineer
- Laura Sisk – vocal recording engineer
- Serban Ghenea – mixing
- Bryce Bordone – mixing engineer
- Randy Merrill – mastering
- Rob Moose – arranger, violin, viola
- James McAlister – drums, electric guitar, percussion, synthesizers
- Jason Slota – percussion

== Charts ==
Chart (2024)	Peak position
Australia (ARIA)	16
Canada Hot 100 (Billboard)	18
France (SNEP)	137
Global 200 (Billboard)	18
Greece International (IFPI)	28
Lithuania (AGATA)	88
New Zealand (Recorded Music NZ)	17
Portugal (AFP)	31
Slovakia Singles Digital (ČNS IFPI)	97
Spain (Promusicae)	90
Sweden (Sverigetopplistan)	60
Swiss Streaming (Schweizer Hitparade)	42
UK Singles Downloads (Official Charts)	76
UK Streaming (OCC)	17
US Billboard Hot 100	14

== Certifications ==
Certifications for "The Smallest Man Who Ever Lived"
Region	Certification	Certified units/sales
Australia (ARIA)	Platinum	70,000^{‡}
Brazil (Pro-Música Brasil)	Platinum	40,000^{‡}
New Zealand (RMNZ)	Gold	15,000^{‡}
United Kingdom (BPI)	Gold	400,000^{‡}
^{‡} Sales+streaming figures based on certification alone.
