= I Can Fix Him (No Really I Can) =

2024 song by Taylor Swift

Song by Taylor Swift

from the album The Tortured Poets Department
- Released: April 19, 2024
- Studio: Conway Recording (Los Angeles); Electric Lady (New York); Rue Boyer A (Paris)
- Genre: Western; Americana; country pop
- Length: 2:36
- Label: Republic
- Songwriters: Taylor Swift; Jack Antonoff
- Producers: Taylor Swift; Jack Antonoff

Lyric video
- "I Can Fix Him (No Really I Can)" on YouTube

"I Can Fix Him (No Really I Can)" is a song by the American singer-songwriter Taylor Swift from her eleventh studio album, The Tortured Poets Department (2024). Written and produced by Swift and Jack Antonoff, it is a Western, Americana, and country pop song with a sparse arrangement featuring twangy tremolo guitars backed by drum machine and keyboards. Its lyrics use outlaw imagery and sexual innuendos to describe the narrator's intentions to "fix" her problematic romantic partner before realizing she cannot.

Some critics praised the song's production and sultry vibe, deeming it a sonic highlight of the album. "I Can Fix Him (No Really I Can)" peaked at number 20 on the Billboard Global 200 chart and peaked within the top 40 in Australia, Canada, Greece, New Zealand, Portugal, Singapore, and the United States. Swift performed the song live twice during the Eras Tour in 2024, during the stops in Madrid and Warsaw.

== Background and release ==
At the 66th Annual Grammy Awards on February 4, 2024, Taylor Swift won the award for Best Pop Vocal Album for Midnights (2022). During her acceptance speech, she announced that her eleventh studio album, The Tortured Poets Department, would be released on April 19. She had developed the album over the previous two years, since she finished Midnights, and continued working on it through the US leg of the Eras Tour amidst publicized reports on her breakup with the English actor Joe Alwyn and a brief romance with the English musician Matty Healy. She described the album as a "lifeline" and something she "really needed" to make.

"I Can Fix Him (No Really I Can)" was released as part of The Tortured Poets Department on April 19, 2024, via Republic Records; it is number 11 on the standard track listing. The song peaked at number 20 on the Billboard Global 200. It reached the top 40 on charts in Portugal (40), Canada (22), New Zealand (21), the United States (20), Singapore (19), and Australia (19), where it was certified gold. Swift performed "I Can Fix Him (No Really I Can)" live twice during the Eras Tour in 2024; the first time on guitar as a mashup with "Sparks Fly" during the May 29 show in Madrid, then again on guitar as a mashup with "I Can See You" during the August 2 show in Warsaw.

== Composition and lyrics ==
"I Can Fix Him (No Really I Can)"
The sparse arrangement of "I Can Fix Him (No Really I Can)" incorporates tremolo guitars and reverbed percussion slaps.

"I Can Fix Him (No Really I Can)" is a Western, Americana, and country pop track that experiments with Southern Gothic and country elements. In it, Swift sings in the lower register of her vocals. The track's arrangement is minimal and features sparse, tremolo twangy guitars, a backdrop of drum machines and keyboards, and reverbed percussion slaps to accentuate the lyrics. Swift's vocal harmonies are backed by synths. Rob Sheffield of Rolling Stone described the arrangement as "moody coffee-house", while Nate Jones of Vulture wrote that the production sounds "like it comes straight out of an Old West saloon".

The lyrics depict a narrator being confident in her abilities to "fix" her problematic man, until she realizes at the end that she cannot do so. Although other people in the bar wonder why the couple is together, the narrator is determined to bring out the sweet nature of her lover. The song contains sexual innuendos and outlaw imagery. It also uses imagery of God and heaven to describe the narrator falling for a bad boy ("They shake their heads sayin', 'God, help her'/ When I tell 'em he's my man").

== Critical reception ==
The song received generally positive reviews from music critics. Slant Magazine selected "I Can Fix Him (No Really I Can)" as one of the 20 best collaborations of Swift and Antonoff. Annie Zaleski regarded the song as a sonic highlight on The Tortured Poets Department and wrote that it is best listened to using "very good headphones", and Jones described it as a "fun little genre pastiche". In The New York Times, Jon Pareles thought that the track contained some of the best musical moments on the album, and Lindsay Zoladz picked the ending line ("Woah, maybe I can't") as one of her favorite moments. Mary Kate Carr of The A.V. Club wrote that "I Can Fix Him (No Really I Can)" is one of the album's more interesting tracks sonically with its "sultry" vibe. Consequence's Mary Siroky praised its "lonesome, moody instrumentals" that made it one of "a few wonderful moments of personality".

Sheffield considered the title of "I Can Fix Him (No Really I Can)" a "quintessential Taylor song title" and highlighted her vocals: "she always takes a bit of sadistic pleasure singing those words to a man." In a ranking of the album's tracks, Jason Lipshutz of Billboard ranked the song 18th out of 31, saying that Swift "nicely operates in her lower register" and conveys the "half-convinced feeling" through lilted syllables. However, Paste provided a negative review, saying that while the track showed Swift venturing to musical directions that evoked the "country renegades" before her like Tammy Wynette and Loretta Lynn, it fell flat due to her "self-aggrandizing inflation of importance, glinting through via a seismically-bland bridge".

== Personnel ==
Credits adapted from the liner notes of The Tortured Poets Department

- Taylor Swift – lead vocals, songwriter, producer
- Jack Antonoff – producer, songwriter, programming, percussion, Moog Voyager, piano, Juno, Mellotron, bass, acoustic guitar, electric guitar
- Laura Sisk – engineering, recording
- Oli Jacobs – engineering, recording
- Christopher Rowe – engineering, recording
- Jack Manning – engineering assistance
- Jon Sher – engineering assistance
- Rémy Dumelz – engineering assistance
- Serban Ghenea – mixing
- Bryce Bordone – mix engineering
- Randy Merrill – mastering
- Ryan Smith – vinyl mastering

== Charts ==
Chart (2024)	Peak position
Australia (ARIA)	19
Canada Hot 100 (Billboard)	22
Czech Republic Singles Digital (ČNS IFPI)	91
France (SNEP)	151
Global 200 (Billboard)	20
Greece International (IFPI)	40
New Zealand (Recorded Music NZ)	21
Portugal (AFP)	40
Singapore (RIAS)	19
Sweden (Sverigetopplistan)	62
Swiss Streaming (Schweizer Hitparade)	44
UK Streaming (OCC)	22
US Billboard Hot 100	20

== Certification ==
Certification for "I Can Fix Him (No Really I Can)"
Region	Certification	Certified units/sales
Australia (ARIA)	Gold	35,000^{‡}
Brazil (Pro-Música Brasil)	Platinum	40,000^{‡}
United Kingdom (BPI)	Silver	200,000^{‡}
^{‡} Sales+streaming figures based on certification alone.
