= The Albatross (song) =

2024 song by Taylor Swift

Song by Taylor Swift

from the album The Tortured Poets Department: The Anthology
- Released: April 19, 2024
- Studio: Long Pond (Hudson Valley); Narwhal Studios (Chicago); Unknown studios (Los Angeles, Paris); Air Studios (London)
- Genre: Indie folk
- Length: 3:03
- Label: Republic
- Songwriters: Taylor Swift; Aaron Dessner
- Producers: Taylor Swift; Aaron Dessner

Lyric video
- "The Albatross" on YouTube

"The Albatross" is a song by the American singer-songwriter Taylor Swift. Written and produced by her and Aaron Dessner, the track is a soft indie folk ballad. Inspired by Samuel Taylor Coleridge's 1798 poem The Rime of the Ancient Mariner, Swift uses an albatross as a metaphor and a personification for public perception, regret and self-definition.

"The Albatross" was first released as a bonus track in a physical edition of The Tortured Poets Department on April 19, 2024, and then digitally as part of a double album edition, The Anthology, two hours later. The song peaked at number 32 at the Billboard Global 200 and reached the national charts of the United States and Canada. Swift performed the song live multiple times on her Eras Tour as a surprise song (2023–2024).

== Background ==
Taylor Swift conceived her eleventh original studio album, The Tortured Poets Department after the release of her previous album, Midnights (2022). She further continued her work during the US Leg of her sixth concert tour, The Eras Tour in 2023 amidst heightened fame and personal life. On February 4, 2024, Swift later announced The Tortured Poets Department at the 66th Annual Grammy Awards during her acceptance speech for the Best Pop Vocal Album award for Midnights. Swift described the album as a "lifeline" for her and one that she "needed" to create, detailing how its development somewhat reminded her that songwriting was an integral part of her life.

Swift wrote the track with her longtime collaborator, Aaron Dessner, who produced and recorded the track at Long Pond (Hudson Valley), Narwhal Studios (Chicago), Air Studios (UK) and unnamed studios in Los Angeles, California and Paris, France. The song was mixed at Mixstar Studios by Serban Ghenea and Bryce Bordone. The track was mastered by the engineers Randy Merrill & Ryan Smith, at Sterling Sound, while Swift's vocals were recorded by Bella Blasko, Jonathan Low, James McAlister, Ben Lanz, and Jeremy Murphy. Dessner played synthesizers, piano, keyboards, guitar, electric guitar, percussion, bass guitar and acoustic guitar for the track.

== Composition ==
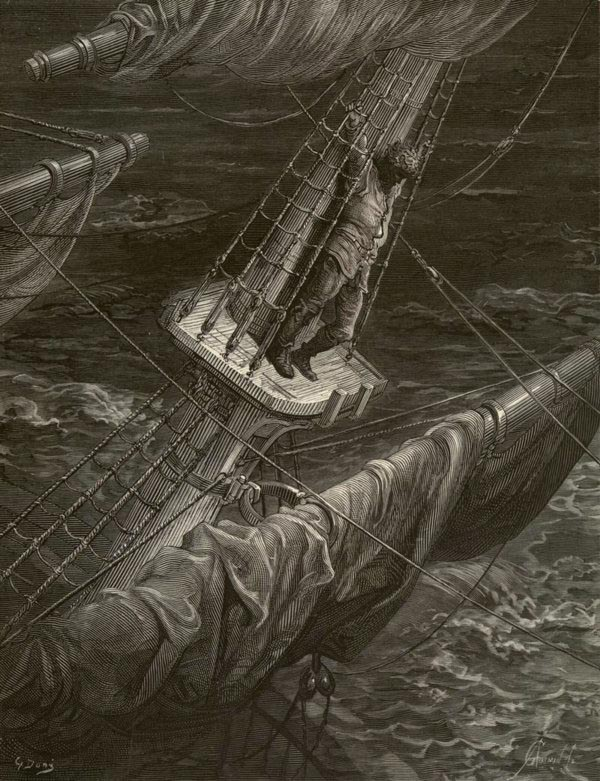
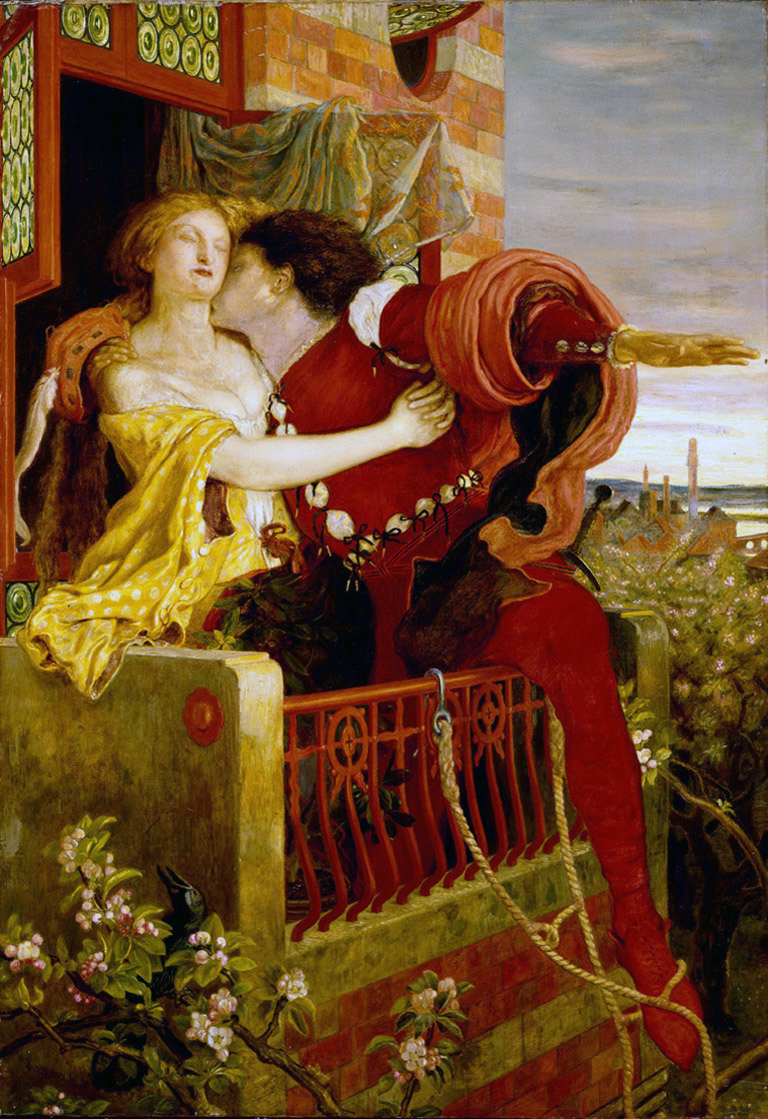
"The Albatross" is inspired by the 1798 poem, The Rime of the Ancient Mariner written by Samuel Taylor Coleridge. The lyric "A rose by any other name is a scandal" serves as a direct reference to William Shakespeare's tragedy, Romeo and Juliet. (right)

At three minutes and three seconds long, "The Albatross" is an indie folk ballad, with a midtempo rhythm. Critics compared the song to Swift's previous albums – Reputation (2017) and Evermore (2020) due to its lyrical content and production. Miranda Siwak of Us Weekly pointed out that the song is named after a hotel that was allegedly the setting of a fire incident near a Coney Island in New York City, occurring in 1903.

"The Albatross" incorporates the albatross metaphor which originated from the 1798 poem, The Rime of the Ancient Mariner, written by Samuel Taylor Coleridge, as well as a direct reference to William Shakespeare's tragedy, Romeo and Juliet in a line of the song. Swift starts the song in third-person as she compares herself to an albatross as both a representation of danger and burden, and a medium for salvation. Throughout the song, she warns her partner about the warnings and perceptions surrounding her, including advice from others discouraging the relationship due to concerns about its potential impact on his reputation and career. Swift inverts the metaphor in the final chorus and shifts to a first-person narration, reframing herself from a perceived threat into a protective figure: "So I crossed my thoughtless heart / Spread my wings like a parachute / I'm the albatross / I swept in at the rescue".

Swift's fans, Swifties, commented that her outfit during the 66th Annual Grammy Awards – a custom white strapless gown paired with black gloves – was a direct reference to "The Albatross".

== Release and live performances ==
"The Albatross" was initially released as a bonus track as part of a physical edition of The Tortured Poets Department, which was temporarily available for pre-order on Swift's website and was released alongside the standard edition on April 19, 2024, under Republic Records. Two hours after the album's release, the song became available for streaming and digital download when a double album edition, subtitled The Anthology, was surprise-released with 31 songs; "The Albatross" is the album's 19th track.

Swift performed "The Albatross" for the first time on her Eras Tour, on June 29, 2024 at the Dublin stop, mashed-up with her song "Dancing with Our Hands Tied" (2017). It was performed again at the tour's Indianapolis show on November 1, 2024, mashed-up with her song "Holy Ground" (2012).

== Critical reception and commercial performance ==
"The Albatross" was praised by several critics for its lyrical references and production. In Billboard's ranking of all 31 tracks of The Tortured Poets Department, "The Albatross" was placed 25th, with Jason Lipshutz highlighting the bridge and comparing the production to Swift's previous works Folklore and Evermore (2020). Similarly, The Hollywood Reporter journalist Ryan Fish described the song as "reminiscent of the identity she's previously taken on for songs like 'Blank Space'", ranking it at 19th. Craig Jenkins of Vulture commented on the song's "referential melodrama", stating the imagery of a woman locked in a tower may allude to the imprisonment of Mary, Queen of Scots.

In a ranking list of Swift's discography, Rob Sheffield of Rolling Stone placed "The Albatross" at 215th.

"The Albatross" reached number 32 at the Billboard Global 200 as well as the national charts of the United States (number 30) and Canada (number 31).

== Charts ==
Chart (2024)	Peak position
Australia (ARIA)	29
Canada Hot 100 (Billboard)	31
Global 200 (Billboard)	32
Greece International (IFPI)	66
New Zealand (Recorded Music NZ)	35
Portugal (AFP)	93
Sweden Heatseeker (Sverigetopplistan)	6
UK Singles Sales (OCC)	70
UK Streaming (OCC)	42
US Billboard Hot 100	30

== Certifications ==
Certifications for "The Albatross"
Region	Certification	Certified units/sales
Brazil (Pro-Música Brasil)	Gold	20,000^{‡}
^{‡} Sales+streaming figures based on certification alone.

== Credits and personnel ==
Adapted from the liner notes of The Tortured Poets Department: The Anthology

- Recorded at Long Pond Studios, Hudson Valley
- Bryce Dessner's orchestration recorded in Biarritz
- Aaron Dessner's performance recorded at Long Pond Studios, Hudson Valley
- Glenn Kotche's performance recorded at Narwhal Studios, Chicago
- James McAlister's performance recorded at Adventureland Studios, Chicago
- Benjamin Lanz's performance recorded in Paris, France
- London Contemporary Orchestra's performance recorded at AIR Studios, London
- Mixed at Mixstar Studios, Virginia Beach, Virginia
- Mastered at Sterling Sound, Edgewater, New Jersey
- Mastered for vinyl at Sterling Sound, Nashville, Tennessee

=== Musicians ===
- Taylor Swift – vocals, songwriting, production
- Aaron Dessner – production, songwriting, piano, synthesizer, drum machine programming, electric guitar, acoustic guitar, keyboards, percussion
- James McAlister – drum machine programing
- Glen Kotche – drums, percussion
- Benjamin Lanz – synthesizer
- Bryce Dessner – orchestration
- London Contemporary Orchestra
  - Conductor – Robert Ames
  - First violin – Eloisa-Fleur Thom (leader), Sophie Mather, Marriane Haynes, Alicia Berendse, Anna de Bruin, Akiko Ishikawa, Nicole Crespo O'Donoghue, Julian Azkoul
  - Second violin – Emily Holland, Kirsty Mangan, Cara Laskaris, Ronald Long, Dan Oates, Iona Allan
  - Viola – Nicholas Bootiman, Matthew Kettle, Amy Swain, Elisa Bergersen, Morgan Goff
  - Cello – Brian O'Kane, Reinoud Ford, Max Ruisi, Abi Hyde-Smith
  - Double bass – Dave Brown, Chris Kelly, Sophie Roper
  - Percussion – George Barton

=== Technical ===
- Serban Ghenea – mixing
- Bryce Bordone – mix engineering
- Randy Merrill – mastering
- Ryan Smith – mastering for vinyl
- James McAlister – recording engineering
- Benjamin Lanz – recording engineering
- Bella Blasko – recording engineering
- Jeremy Murphy – recording engineering
- Jonathan Low – recording engineering
- Laura Beck – recording engineering
- London Contemporary Orchestra
  - Digital recordist – Gianluca Massimo
  - Copyist – Tristan Noon
  - Recording projects manager – Meg Monteith
  - Orchestra manager – Amy-Elisabeth Hinds
