= Guilty as Sin? =

2024 song by Taylor Swift

Song by Taylor Swift

from the album The Tortured Poets Department
- Released: April 19, 2024
- Studio: Conway Recording (Los Angeles); Electric Lady (New York); Prime Recording (Nashville)
- Genre: Pop rock; soft rock
- Length: 4:14
- Label: Republic
- Songwriters: Taylor Swift; Jack Antonoff
- Producers: Taylor Swift; Jack Antonoff

Lyric video
- "Guilty as Sin?" on YouTube

"Guilty as Sin?" is a song by the American singer-songwriter Taylor Swift from her eleventh studio album, The Tortured Poets Department (2024). She wrote and produced the song with Jack Antonoff. It is a 1990s-tinged pop rock and soft rock track combining rock, country, and folk styles, accentuated by guitars and live drums. The lyrics see Swift's character sexually fantasizing about a man while being in a relationship.

In reviews of The Tortured Poets Department, the song received highly positive reviews, with critics generally praising its lyrics, production, and vocals, and some picking it as an album highlight. The track peaked at number 11 on the Billboard Global 200 and charted within the top 10 in Australia, Singapore, and the United States and the top 20 in several other countries.

== Background and release ==
Swift started working on The Tortured Poets Department immediately after she submitted her tenth studio album, Midnights, to Republic Records for release in 2022. She continued working on it in secrecy throughout the US leg of the Eras Tour in 2023. The album's conception took place when Swift's personal life continued to be a widely covered topic in the press. She described The Tortured Poets Department as her "lifeline" album which she "really needed" to make. Republic Records released it on April 19, 2024; "Guilty as Sin?" is ninth on the track list. On May 18, Swift performed the song on guitar at the Stockholm stop of the Eras Tour; and as a mashup with "Untouchable" on July 4 in Amsterdam. On October 20, Swift performed the song as a mashup with "Mirrorball" on piano in Miami.

== Music and lyrics ==
"Guilty as Sin?"
"Guilty as Sin?" is a pop rock and soft rock song with live drums and guitars. In the refrain, Swift sings with melisma vocals.

Swift wrote and produced "Guilty as Sin?" with Jack Antonoff, who programmed the song and played drums, bass, electric guitar, acoustic guitar, and Juno. The track was recorded by Oli Jacobs and Laura Sisk at Conway Recording Studios in Los Angeles and Electric Lady Studios in New York, while Swift's vocals were recorded by Sisk and Christopher Rowe at Electric Lady Studios in New York and Prime Recording in Nashville. The track's mixing was engineered by Bryce Bordone and conducted by Serban Ghenea at MixStar Studios in Virginia Beach.

"Guilty as Sin?" is 4 minutes and 14 seconds long. It is a 1990s-tinged soft rock and pop rock track combining stylings of rock, country, and folk, accentuated by guitar and live drums. In the chorus, Swift sings using melisma. Lyrically, the song is about desire where Swift's character, while still in a relationship, longs for intimacy with another man. The relationship in question has her feeling trapped ("My boredom's bone deep/ This cage was once just fine/ Am I allowed to cry?/ I dream of crackin' locks"). She questions whether she should be guilty about her sexual thoughts ("What if he's written 'mine' on my upper thigh / Only in my mind?") and rationalizes them ("Without ever touching his skin, how can I be guilty as sin?").

The track features extensive religious imagery, with Swift singing, "What if I roll the stone away?/ They're gonna crucify me anyway", showing that the narrator is aware of others' perception of her. The lyrics, "These fatal fantasies/ Giving way to labored breath/ Taking all of me/ We've already done it in my head", were interpreted as an allusion to masturbation by journalists including The Guardian's Laura Snapes and the BBC's Clare Thorp. Mehera Bonner of Cosmopolitan commented that "Guilty as Sin?" is lyrically connected with Swift's 2022 song "Carolina", a track that features the phrase "guilty as sin" to describe "[sleeping] in a liar's bed". Meanwhile, The Tennessean's Bryan West compared the theme of infidelity to "Gorgeous", a track from Swift's 2017 album Reputation.

The song features a reference to the Scottish band the Blue Nile and their 1989 single "The Downtown Lights" in the lyrics ("Drowning in the Blue Nile/ He sent me 'Downtown Lights'/ I hadn't heard it in a while"). This led to an increase of 1,400% in streams of "The Downtown Lights" within four days of the release of The Tortured Poets Department, and increase of vinyl sales for the band's albums.

== Critical reception ==
"Guilty as Sin?" received highly positive reviews by music critics. Ken Tucker of NPR appreciated the song for showcasing Swift's vulnerable and weak sides compared to contemporary pop culture's saturation of "kick-butt, tough, perfect, independent women" and found the track to have "a cleverly retrograde image". Reviewing the album for Vanity Fair, Erin Vanderhoff described the song as "charming and beguiling" and considered it the album's "emotional apex". In a staff review of the album for The Spinoff, Alex Casey and Isaiah Tour picked the track as one of their favorites. Similarly, Ross Horton off MusicOMH attributed its success to the ambivalent lyrical sentiments and saying that the track "would be a highlight on any of her records".

The production and Swift's vocals also received praise. West described the song as a "catchy song with elongated, ethereal harmonies". In the Irish Independent, John Meagher complimented the lyrics and Swift's singing for featuring "one of the loveliest vocals Swift has ever committed to tape". John Wohlmacher from Beats Per Minute said that the track was one of the album's better songs, highlighting the "sensual" guitar alongside "seductive" and "lush" vocals. In The Atlantic, Spencer Kornhaber opined that "Guilty as Sin?" is one of the album's best moments for its "perfect" combination of live drums, rock/country elements, and Swift's "keening" voice. Jason Lipshutz of Billboard ranked "Guilty as Sin?" ninth out of the 31 tracks on the double album edition of The Tortured Poets Department, writing: "the real fireworks come from Swift's vocal nuances."

Mary Siroky in Consequence selected "Guilty as Sin?" as one of the album's "essential tracks" for showcasing a "personality", and Anna Leszkiewicz from the New Statesman similarly picked it as one of the album's "bright pop tracks [that] shine through the fog". Lindsay Zoladz of The New York Times appreciated the track for its 1990s soft rock production and Swift's vocals. Giving the track four stars out of five, Will Hodgkinson of The Times wrote, "The earnest, thoroughly American delivery mars the eroticism somewhat, but it comes straight from the Fleetwood Mac school of pop-rock inspired by disastrous romance." Maria Sherman from the Associated Press gave a negative review, saying that "Guilty as Sin?" is one of the album's "missteps" for its "mawkish" lyrics.

== Commercial performance ==
When The Tortured Poets Department was released, tracks from the album occupied the top 14 of the US Billboard Hot 100, making Swift the first artist to monopolize the top 14; "Guilty as Sin?" opened at its peak of number 10 on the chart. In Australia, the song reached number 10 on the ARIA Singles Chart and made her the artist with the most entries in a single week with 29. Elsewhere, "Guilty as Sin?" peaked at number eight in Singapore and charted within the top 20 on the Billboard Global 200 (11), New Zealand (11), the Philippines (12), Canada (13), Malaysia (17), and Ireland (18).

== Personnel ==
- Taylor Swift – vocals, songwriter, producer
- Jack Antonoff – producer, songwriter, drums, programming, percussion, Juno, bass, electric guitar, acoustic guitar
- Serban Ghenea – mixing
- Bryce Bordone – mix engineer
- Laura Sisk – recording engineer, vocal engineer
- Oli Jacobs – recording engineer
- Jon Sher – assistant recording engineer
- Jack Manning – assistant recording engineer
- Christopher Rowe – vocal engineer
- Randy Merrill – mastering
- Bobby Hawk – strings

== Charts ==
=== Weekly charts ===
Weekly chart performance
Chart (2024)	Peak position
Argentina Hot 100 (Billboard)	96
Australia (ARIA)	10
Brazil Hot 100 (Billboard)	75
Canada Hot 100 (Billboard)	13
Czech Republic Singles Digital (ČNS IFPI)	67
France (SNEP)	103
Global 200 (Billboard)	11
Greece International (IFPI)	24
Lithuania (AGATA)	66
Malaysia (Billboard)	23
Malaysia International (RIM)	17
New Zealand (Recorded Music NZ)	11
Slovakia Singles Digital (ČNS IFPI)	73
Philippines (Billboard)	12
Portugal (AFP)	28
Singapore (RIAS)	8
Spain (Promusicae)	84
Sweden (Sverigetopplistan)	49
Swiss Streaming (Schweizer Hitparade)	32
UAE (IFPI)	20
UK Streaming (OCC)	16
US Billboard Hot 100	10

=== Year-end charts ===
Year-end chart performance
Chart (2024)	Peak position
Philippines (Philippines Hot 100)	86

== Certifications ==
Region	Certification	Certified units/sales
Australia (ARIA)	Platinum	70,000^{‡}
Brazil (Pro-Música Brasil)	3× Platinum	120,000^{‡}
New Zealand (RMNZ)	Platinum	30,000^{‡}
United Kingdom (BPI)	Gold	400,000^{‡}
^{‡} Sales+streaming figures based on certification alone.
