= List of Australian chart achievements and milestones =

This is a comprehensive listing which highlights significant achievements and milestones in Australian music chart history, based upon Kent Music Report and Australian Recording Industry Association.

== Songs with the most weeks at number one ==
24 weeks

- Tones and I – "Dance Monkey" (2019–20)

21 weeks

- Olivia Dean – "Man I Need" (2025–26)

17 weeks

- The Kid Laroi and Justin Bieber – "Stay" (2021–22)
- Alex Warren – "Ordinary" (2025)

16 weeks

- Ella Langley – "Choosin' Texas" (2026)

15 weeks

- Ed Sheeran – "Shape of You" (2017)

14 weeks

- ABBA – "Fernando" (1976)
- Rosé and Bruno Mars – "Apt." (2024–25)

13 weeks

- Dinah Shore – "Buttons and Bows" (1949)
- The Beatles – "Hey Jude" (1968)
- Coolio featuring L.V. – "Gangsta's Paradise" (1995–96)
- Luis Fonsi and Daddy Yankee featuring Justin Bieber – "Despacito" (2017)
- Lil Nas X – "Old Town Road" (2019)

== Artists with the most number-one songs ==
- The Beatles (26)
- Taylor Swift (15)
- Elvis Presley (14)
- Madonna (11)
- Kylie Minogue (10)
- Rihanna (10)
- Delta Goodrem (9)
- Justin Bieber (9)
- Pink (9)
- Eminem (9)

== Artists with the most consecutive number-one songs ==
- The Beatles – 14 (1966–1970)
- The Beatles – 7 (1964–1965)
- Delta Goodrem – 6 (2002–2004)
- ABBA – 6 (1975–1976)

== Longest climb to No. 1 on the ARIA Singles Chart ==
- 36 years and 10 months – "Running Up That Hill" – Kate Bush (August 1985 – June 2022)
- 25 years and 4 months – "Unchained Melody" – The Righteous Brothers (August 1965 – November 1990)
- 24 years – "All I Want for Christmas Is You" – Mariah Carey (December 1994 – December 2018)
- 38 weeks – "Cruel Summer" – Taylor Swift (September 2019 – February 2024)
- 28 weeks – "Not Like Us" – Kendrick Lamar (17 February 2025)
- 22 weeks – "Without You" – The Kid Laroi (10 May 2021)
- 21 weeks – "Perfect" – Ed Sheeran (17 December 2017)

== Longest climb to No. 1 on the ARIA Top 100 Albums Chart (1983–present) ==
- 138 weeks – Led Zeppelin Remasters – Led Zeppelin (debut 18-Nov-90/Peak 11-Jul-93)
- 77 weeks – The Very Best – INXS (peak 23-Feb-2014)
- 69 weeks – Janet Jackson's Rhythm Nation 1814 – Janet Jackson (debut 16-Oct-89, peak 3-Feb-91)
- 65 weeks – Come On Over – Shania Twain (debut 23-Nov-97, peak 8-Feb-99) (Note: Also the #1 ARIA album of 1999)
- 59 weeks – Elephunk – The Black Eyed Peas (debut 14-July-03, peak 23-Aug-04)
- 52 weeks – Don't Ask – Tina Arena (debut 27-Nov-94, peak 19-Nov-95) (Note: Also the #1 ARIA album of 1995)
- 48 weeks – In the Lonely Hour – Sam Smith (debut 8-June-2014, peak 3-May-15)
- 46 weeks – Whitney Houston – Whitney Houston (debut 17-June-1985, peak 2-June-86)
- 46 weeks – + – Ed Sheeran (debut 3-Oct-11, peak 13-Aug-12)
- 45 weeks – Crowded House – Crowded House (debut 28-July-86, peak 8-June-87)
- 45 weeks – The Dutchess – Fergie (debut 25-Sep-06, peak 30-July-07)
- 43 weeks – Escape – Enrique Iglesias (debut 12-Nov-01, peak 26-Aug-02)
- 41 weeks – The Dream of the Blue Turtles – Sting (debut 8-July-1985, peak 21-Apr-86)
- 41 weeks – The Marshall Mathers LP – Eminem (debut 29-May-00, peak 5-Mar-01)
- 40 weeks – Hysteria – Def Leppard (debut 23-Oct-88, peak 31-July-89)

== Songs making the biggest drop from number one ==
- 1→100+ Mariah Carey – "All I Want For Christmas Is You" (2018, coinciding with the end of the Christmas period)
- 1→54 Karise Eden – "Stay with Me Baby" (2012, coinciding with the end of The Voice Australia)
- 1→24 Celine Dion – "My Heart Will Go On" (1998, CD single pulled from the shelves to be replaced by the dance version two weeks later which then peaked at No. 3)
- 1→15 Jesse McCartney – "Beautiful Soul" (2005)
- 1→12 Reece Mastin – "Shout it Out" (2012)
- 1→12 Katy Perry – "Rise" (2016)

== Songs making the biggest jump to number one inside Top 100 (1963–present) ==
- 59→1 Wiz Khalifa featuring Charlie Puth – "See You Again" (2015)
- 41→1 Elton John – "Something About the Way You Look Tonight" / "Candle in the Wind 1997" (1997)
- 37→1 Sinéad O'Connor – "Nothing Compares 2 U" (1990)
- 36→1 The Beatles – "Yellow Submarine / Eleanor Rigby" (1966)
- 31→1 Kylie Minogue – "Confide in Me" (1994)
- 31→1 Rihanna – "Don't Stop The Music" (2008)
- 27→1 Kendrick Lamar – "Not Like Us" (2025)
- 26→1 Delta Goodrem – "Wings" (2015)
- 20→1 Lukas Graham – "7 Years" (2016)
- 19→1 Madonna – "Vogue" (1990)
- 18→1 Sheppard – "Geronimo" (2014)
- 17→1 Nena – "99 Luftballons" (1984)
- 17→1 Lady Gaga and Bradley Cooper – "Shallow" (2018)
- 16→1 The Beatles – "Can't Buy Me Love / You Can't Do That" (1964)
- 16→1 Coolio featuring L.V. – "Gangsta's Paradise" (1995–1996)
- 13→1 Creedence Clearwater Revival – "Up Around the Bend / Run Through the Jungle" (1970)
- 12→1 Kelly Clarkson – "Mr. Know It All" (2011)
- 11→1 David Bowie – "Sorrow" (1974)
- 11→1 Shaggy – "Boombastic" (1996)
- 11→1 Colbie Caillat – "Bubbly" (2008)
- 11→1 Richard Marx – "Right Here Waiting" (1989)
- 10→1 The Black Eyed Peas – "The Time (Dirty Bit)" (2010)
- 10→1 The Kid Laroi – "Without You" (2021)

== Most number-one singles from a single album ==
- 5 – Delta Goodrem – Innocent Eyes (2003)
  - "Born to Try"
  - "Lost Without You"
  - "Innocent Eyes"
  - "Not Me, Not I"
  - "Predictable"
- 3 – ABBA – ABBA (1975)
  - "I Do, I Do, I Do, I Do, I Do"
  - "Mamma Mia"
  - "SOS"
- 3 – ABBA – Arrival (1976)
  - "Fernando"
  - "Dancing Queen"
  - "Money, Money, Money"
- 3 – Kylie Minogue – Kylie (1988)
  - "Locomotion"
  - "I Should Be So Lucky"
  - "Got to Be Certain"
- 3 – Britney Spears – In the Zone (2003)
  - "Me Against the Music" (featuring Madonna)
  - "Toxic"
  - "Everytime"
- 3 – The Black Eyed Peas – The E.N.D. (2009)
  - "Boom Boom Pow"
  - "I Gotta Feeling"
  - "Meet Me Halfway"
- 3 – Macklemore & Ryan Lewis – The Heist (2012–2013)
  - "Thrift Shop" (featuring Wanz)
  - "Same Love" (featuring Mary Lambert)
  - "Can't Hold Us" (featuring Ray Dalton)
- 3 – Taylor Swift – 1989 (2014–2015)
  - "Shake It Off"
  - "Blank Space"
  - "Bad Blood" (featuring Kendrick Lamar)
- 3 – Drake – Scorpion (2018)
  - "God's Plan"
  - "Nice for What"
  - "In My Feelings"
- 3 – Sabrina Carpenter – Short n' Sweet (2024)
  - "Espresso"
  - "Please Please Please"
  - "Taste"
- 3 - Olivia Rodrigo - you seem pretty sad for a girl so in love (2026)
  - "stupid song"
  - "the cure"
  - "drop dead"

== Most top five songs from a single album ==
=== Nine ===
- Taylor Swift – The Life of a Showgirl (2025)
  - "The Fate of Ophelia" (No. 1)
  - "Patient Zero" (No. 1)
  - "Opalite" (No. 2)
  - "Elizabeth Taylor" (No. 3)
  - "Cleveland!" (No. 3)
  - "Father Figure" (No. 4)
  - "Babylon" (No.4)
  - "Wood" (No.5)
  - "Pink Clouding" (No.5)

=== Six ===
- Ed Sheeran – ÷ (2017)
  - "Shape of You" (No. 1)
  - "Perfect" (No. 1)
  - "Castle on the Hill" (No. 2)
  - "How Would You Feel (Paean)" (No. 2)
  - "Galway Girl" (No. 2)
  - "Dive" (No. 5)
- Taylor Swift – Midnights (2022)
  - "Anti-Hero" (No. 1)
  - "Lavender Haze" (No. 2)
  - "Karma" (No. 2)
  - "Snow on the Beach" (No. 3)
  - "Maroon" (No. 4)
  - "Midnight Rain" (No. 5)

=== Five ===
- Delta Goodrem – Innocent Eyes (2002–2004)
  - "Born to Try" (No. 1)
  - "Lost Without You" (No. 1)
  - "Innocent Eyes" (No. 1)
  - "Not Me, Not I" (No. 1)
  - "Predictable" (No. 1)
- Pink – I'm Not Dead (2006–2007)
  - "Who Knew" (No. 2)
  - "Stupid Girls" (No. 4)
  - "U + Ur Hand" (No. 5)
  - "Leave Me Alone (I'm Lonely)" (No. 5)
  - "Dear Mr. President" (No. 5)
- Fergie – The Dutchess (2006–2007)
  - "Big Girls Don't Cry" (No. 1)
  - "Glamorous" (No. 2)
  - "Clumsy" (No. 3)
  - "London Bridge" (No. 3)
  - "Fergalicious" (No. 4)
- Katy Perry – Teenage Dream (2010–2011)
  - "California Gurls" (featuring Snoop Dogg) (No. 1)
  - "Teenage Dream" (No. 2)
  - "Firework" (No. 3)
  - "E.T." (featuring Kanye West) (No. 5)
  - "Last Friday Night (T.G.I.F.)" (No. 5)
- Drake – Scorpion (2018)
  - "God's Plan" (No. 1)
  - "Nice for What" (No. 1)
  - "In My Feelings" (No. 1)
  - "Don't Matter to Me" (No. 3)
  - "Nonstop" (No. 5)
- Taylor Swift – The Tortured Poets Department (2024)
  - "Fortnight" (No. 1)
  - "Down Bad" (No. 2)
  - "The Tortured Poets Department" (No. 3)
  - "So Long, London" (No. 4)
  - "I Can Do It with a Broken Heart" (No. 5)

== Most top-tens in a year ==
- 11 – Taylor Swift (2023)
  - "Is It Over Now?" (No. 1)
  - "Now That We Don't Talk" (No. 2)
  - "Cruel Summer" (No. 2)
  - "Say Don't Go" (No. 3)
  - "Slut!" (No. 4)
  - "I Can See You" (No. 5)
  - "Style (Taylor's Version)" (No. 7)
  - "Enchanted (Taylor's Version)" (No. 7)
  - "Suburban Legends" (No. 8)
  - "Blank Space (Taylor's Version)" (No. 9)
  - "Mine (Taylor's Version)" (No. 10)
- 10 – Taylor Swift (2024)
  - "Fortnight" (No. 1)
  - "Down Bad" (No. 2)
  - "The Tortured Poets Department" (No. 3)
  - "So Long, London" (No. 4)
  - "I Can Do It with a Broken Heart" (No. 5)
  - "My Boy Only Breaks His Favorite Toys" (No.6)
  - "But Daddy I Love Him" (No.7)
  - "Florida!!!" (No.8)
  - "Who's Afraid of Little Old Me?" (No.9)
  - "Guilty as Sin?" (No.10)
- 9 – Taylor Swift (2022)
  - "Anti-Hero" (No. 1)
  - "Lavender Haze" (No. 2)
  - "Karma" (No. 2)
  - "Snow on the Beach" (No. 3)
  - "Maroon" (No. 4)
  - "Midnight Rain" (No. 5)
  - "You're on Your Own, Kid" (No. 6)
  - "Bejeweled" (No. 8)
  - "Vigilante Shit" (No. 10)
- 8 – Harry Styles (2022)
  - "As It Was" (No. 1)
  - "Late Night Talking" (No. 2)
  - "Matilda" (No. 3)
  - "Music for a Sushi Restaurant" (No. 4)
  - "Little Freak" (No. 6)
  - "Daylight" (No. 8)
  - "Grapejuice" (No. 9)
  - "Satellite" (No. 10)
- 7 – Ed Sheeran (2017)
  - "Shape of You" (No. 1)
  - "Castle on the Hill" (No. 2)
  - "How Would You Feel (Paean)" (No. 2)
  - "Dive" (No. 5)
  - "Perfect" (No. 1)
  - "Galway Girl" (No. 2)
  - "River" (No. 2) (Eminem featuring Ed Sheeran)
- 7 – Billie Eilish (2019)
  - "Everything I Wanted" (No. 2)
  - "When the Party's Over" (No. 7)
  - "Bury a Friend" (No. 3)
  - "Wish You Were Gay" (No. 5)
  - "Bad Guy" (No. 1)
  - "Xanny" (No. 10)
  - "All the Good Girls Go to Hell" (No. 8)
- 6 – will.i.am (2010)
  - "I Gotta Feeling" (No. 1) (as part of The Black Eyed Peas)
  - "Rock That Body" (No. 8) (as part of The Black Eyed Peas)
  - "3 Words" (No. 5) (Cheryl Cole featuring will.i.am)
  - "Imma Be" (No. 7) (as part of The Black Eyed Peas)
  - "OMG" (No. 1) (Usher featuring will.i.am)
  - "The Time (Dirty Bit)" (No. 1) (as part of The Black Eyed Peas)
- 6 – Flo Rida (2012)
  - "Good Feeling" (No. 4)
  - "Hangover" (No. 3) (Taio Cruz featuring Flo Rida)
  - "Wild Ones" (No. 1) (featuring Sia)
  - "Whistle" (No. 1)
  - "I Cry" (No. 3)
  - "Troublemaker" (No. 4) (Olly Murs featuring Flo Rida)
- 6 – Drake (2018)
  - "God's Plan" (No. 1)
  - "Nice for What" (No. 1)
  - "In My Feelings" (No. 1)
  - "Don't Matter to Me" (No. 3) (featuring Michael Jackson)
  - "Nonstop" (No. 5)
  - "Sicko Mode" (with Travis Scott) (No. 7)
- 6 – Post Malone (2018)
  - "Rockstar" (No. 1) (featuring 21 Savage)
  - "I Fall Apart" (No. 2)
  - "Psycho" (No. 1) (featuring Ty Dolla Sign)
  - "Better Now" (No. 2)
  - "Paranoid" (No. 10)
  - "Sunflower" (No. 2) (with Swae Lee)
- 6 – Taylor Swift (2020)
  - "Cardigan" (No. 1)
  - "Willow" (No. 1)
  - "Exile" (No. 3)
  - "The 1" (No. 4)
  - "The Last Great American Dynasty" (No. 7)
  - "My Tears Ricochet" (No. 8)
- 6 – Drake (2021)
  - "Girls Want Girls" (No. 2) (featuring Lil Baby)
  - "Fair Trade" (No. 3) (featuring Travis Scott)
  - "Champagne Poetry" (No. 6)
  - "What's Next" (No. 7)
  - "Way 2 Sexy" (No. 7) (featuring Future & Young Thug)
  - "Papi's Home" (No. 8)
- 6 – KPop Demon Hunters (2025)
  - "Golden" (No. 1)
  - "Your Idol" (No. 4)
  - "Soda Pop" (No. 4)
  - "How It's Done" (No. 7)
  - "What It Sounds Like" (No. 8)
  - "Free" (No. 10)
- 5 – Fergie (2010)
  - "I Gotta Feeling" (No. 1) (as part of The Black Eyed Peas)
  - "Rock That Body" (No. 8) (as part of The Black Eyed Peas)
  - "Imma Be" (No. 7) (as part of The Black Eyed Peas)
  - "Gettin' Over You" (No. 5) (David Guetta and Chris Willis featuring Fergie and LMFAO)
  - "The Time (Dirty Bit)" (No. 1) (as part of The Black Eyed Peas)
- 5 – Katy Perry (2010)
  - "Starstrukk" (No. 4) (3OH!3 featuring Katy Perry)
  - "If We Ever Meet Again" (No. 9) (Timbaland featuring Katy Perry)
  - "California Gurls" (No. 1) (featuring Snoop Dogg)
  - "Teenage Dream" (No. 2)
  - "Firework" (No. 3)
- 5 – Ke$ha (2010)
  - "Tik Tok" (No. 1)
  - "Blah Blah Blah" (No. 3) (featuring 3OH!3)
  - "Your Love Is My Drug" (No. 3)
  - "Take It Off" (No. 5)
  - "We R Who We R" (No. 1)
- 5 – David Guetta (2011)
  - "Who's That Chick?" (No. 7) (featuring Rihanna)
  - "Sweat" (No. 1) (with Snoop Dogg)
  - "Where Them Girls At" (No. 6) (featuring Flo Rida and Nicki Minaj)
  - "Titanium" (No. 5) (featuring Sia)
  - "Without You" (No. 6) (featuring Usher)
- 5 – Rihanna (2011)
  - "Who's That Chick?" (No. 7) (David Guetta featuring Rihanna)
  - "S&M" (No. 1)
  - "California King Bed" (No. 4)
  - "Cheers (Drink to That)" (No. 6)
  - "We Found Love" (No. 2) (featuring Calvin Harris)
- 5 – Karise Eden (2012)
  - "Nothing's Real but Love" (No. 9)
  - "Hallelujah" (No. 2)
  - "Stay with Me Baby" (No. 1)
  - "I Was Your Girl" (No. 3)
  - "You Won't Let Me" (No. 5)
- 5 – Ed Sheeran (2014)
  - "I See Fire" (No. 10)
  - "Sing" (No. 1)
  - "Don't" (No. 4)
  - "Thinking Out Loud" (No. 1)
  - "Do They Know It's Christmas? (2014)" (No. 3) (as part of Band Aid 30)
- 5 – Taylor Swift (2015)
  - "Shake It Off" (No. 1)
  - "Blank Space" (No. 1)
  - "Style" (No. 8)
  - "Bad Blood" (No. 1) (featuring Kendrick Lamar)
  - "Wildest Dreams" (No. 3)
- 5 – Justin Bieber (2016)
  - "What Do You Mean?" (No. 1)
  - "Sorry" (No. 2)
  - "Love Yourself" (No. 1)
  - "Cold Water" (No. 1) (Major Lazer featuring Justin Bieber and MØ)
  - "Let Me Love You" (No. 2) (DJ Snake featuring Justin Bieber)
- 5 – Khalid (2018)
  - "Silence" (No. 5) (Marshmello featuring Khalid)
  - "Love Lies" (No. 3) (with Normani)
  - "Lovely" (No. 5) (Billie Eilish featuring Khalid)
  - "Eastside" (No. 2) (Benny Blanco featuring Halsey and Khalid)
  - "Better" (No. 6)
- 5 – Ariana Grande (2019)
  - "Thank U, Next" (No. 1)
  - "7 Rings" (No. 1)
  - "Break Up with Your Girlfriend, I'm Bored" (No. 2)
  - "Boyfriend" (with Social House) (No. 4)
  - "Don't Call Me Angel" (with Miley Cyrus and Lana Del Rey) (No. 4)
- 5 – Billie Eilish (2020)
  - "Bad Guy" (No. 1)
  - "Everything I Wanted" (No. 2)
  - "My Future" (No. 3)
  - "Therefore I Am" (No. 3)
  - "No Time to Die" (No. 4)
- 5 – Justin Bieber (2020)
  - "Intentions" (No. 2) (featuring Quavo)
  - "Stuck with U" (No. 3) (with Ariana Grande)
  - "Yummy" (No. 4)
  - "Holy" (No. 4) (featuring Chance the Rapper)
  - "Monster" (No. 7) (with Shawn Mendes)
- 5 – Ariana Grande (2020)
  - "Positions" (No. 1)
  - "Rain On Me" (No. 2) (with Lady Gaga)
  - "Stuck with U" (No. 3) (with Justin Bieber)
  - "Santa Tell Me" (No. 6)
  - "34+35" (No. 9)
- 5 – Ed Sheeran (2021)
  - "Bad Habits" (No. 1)
  - "Shivers" (No. 2)
  - "Visiting Hours" (No. 3)
  - "Afterglow" (No. 7)
  - "Overpass Graffiti" (No. 8)
- 5 – The Weeknd (2021)
  - "Blinding Lights" (No. 1)
  - "Save Your Tears" (No. 3)
  - "Moth to a Flame" (with Swedish House Mafia) (No. 4)
  - "Take My Breath" (No. 9)
  - "One Right Now" (with Post Malone) (No. 9)

== Songs that have hit number one by different artists ==
1. "Mona Lisa" by Dennis Day/Nat King Cole (1950) and Conway Twitty (1959)
2. "Que Sera, Sera (Whatever Will Be, Will Be)" by Doris Day (1956) and Normie Rowe (1965)
3. "In the Summertime" by Mungo Jerry (1970) and The Mixtures (1970)
4. "You're My World" by Cilla Black (1964) and Daryl Braithwaite (1975)
5. "Walk Right In" by The Rooftop Singers (1963) and Dr. Hook (1977)
6. "Venus" by Shocking Blue (1970) and Bananarama (1986)
7. "Funkytown" by Lipps Inc (1980) and Pseudo Echo (1986)
8. "Unchained Melody" by Al Hibbler/Les Baxter (1955) and The Righteous Brothers (1990)
9. "Can't Help Falling in Love" by Elvis Presley (1962) and UB40 (1993, titled (I Can't Help) Falling in Love with You))
10. "The Power of Love" by Jennifer Rush (1985) and Celine Dion (1994)
11. "Stayin' Alive" by Bee Gees (1978) and N-Trance (1995)
12. "Killing Me Softly with His Song" by Roberta Flack (1973) and The Fugees (1996, entitled Killing Me Softly)
13. "American Pie" by Don McLean (1972) and Madonna (2000)
14. "What About Me" by Moving Pictures (1981) and Shannon Noll (2004)
15. "Eye of the Tiger" by Survivor (1982) and Lee Harding (2005, as a double a-side single with "Wasabi")

== Number-one single debuts ==
=== Pre-2000 ===
- Midnight Oil – Species Deceases (EP) (27 November 1985)
- Kylie Minogue – "Got to Be Certain" (10 July 1988)
- U2 – "The Fly" (3 November 1991)
- Meat Loaf – "I'd Do Anything for Love (But I Won't Do That)" (5 September 1993)
- U2 – "Hold Me, Thrill Me, Kiss Me, Kill Me" (9 July 1995)
- George Michael – "Jesus to a Child" (21 January 1996)
- Metallica – "Until It Sleeps" (2 June 1996)
- Fugees – "Killing Me Softly" (23 June 1996)
- Silverchair – "Freak" (26 January 1997)
- Hanson – "MMMBop" (1 June 1997)

=== 2000 ===
- Madonna – "American Pie" (5 March 2000)
- *NSYNC – "Bye Bye Bye" (12 March 2000)
- Bardot – "Poison" (16 April 2000)
- Madison Avenue – "Who the Hell Are You" (11 June 2000)
- Kylie Minogue – "Spinning Around" (25 June 2000)
- Madonna – "Music" (27 August 2000)
- Kylie Minogue – "On a Night Like This" (17 September 2000)
- U2 – "Beautiful Day" (15 October 2000)

=== 2001 ===
- Scandal'us – "Me, Myself & I" (22 April 2001)
- Shaggy featuring Rayvon – "Angel" (3 June 2001)
- Kylie Minogue – "Can't Get You Out of My Head" (16 September 2001)

=== 2002 ===
- Kylie Minogue – "In Your Eyes" (27 January 2002)
- Shakira – "Whenever, Wherever" (3 February 2002)
- Scott Cain – "I'm Moving On" (12 May 2002)
- Eminem – "Without Me" (26 May 2002)
- Holly Valance – "Kiss Kiss" (9 June 2002)
- Shakira – "Underneath Your Clothes" (18 June 2002)
- Elvis Presley vs. JXL – "A Little Less Conversation" (23 June 2002)
- Avril Lavigne – "Complicated" (25 August 2002)
- Las Ketchup – "The Ketchup Song (Aserejé)" (13 October 2002)
- Nelly featuring Kelly Rowland – "Dilemma" (20 October 2002)
- Eminem – "Lose Yourself" (8 December 2002)

=== 2003 ===
- Delta Goodrem – "Lost Without You" (9 March 2003)
- t.A.T.u. – "All the Things She Said" (16 March 2003)
- Justin Timberlake – "Rock Your Body" (11 May 2003)
- R. Kelly – "Ignition (Remix)" (13 July 2003)
- Dido – "White Flag" (21 September 2003)
- Australian Idol: The Final 12 – "Rise Up" (19 October 2003)
- Kylie Minogue – "Slow" (9 November 2003)
- Britney Spears featuring Madonna – "Me Against the Music" (16 November 2003)
- Guy Sebastian – "Angels Brought Me Here" (30 November 2003)

=== 2004 ===
- Shannon Noll – "What About Me" (1 February 2004)
- Guy Sebastian – "All I Need Is You" (29 February 2004)
- Britney Spears – "Toxic" (14 March 2004)
- Usher featuring Ludacris and Lil Jon – "Yeah!" (28 March 2004)
- Frankee – "F.U.R.B. (Fuck You Right Back)" (13 June 2004)
- Britney Spears – "Everytime" (27 June 2004)
- Shannon Noll – "Learn to Fly" (11 July 2004)
- Paulini – "Angel Eyes" (July 2004)
- Missy Higgins – "Scar" (8 August 2004)
- Cosima De Vito – "When the War Is Over"/"One Night Without You" (15 August 2004)
- Nelly featuring Jaheim – "My Place/Flap Your Wings" (29 August 2004)
- Guy Sebastian – "Out with My Baby" (3 October 2004)
- Delta Goodrem – "Out of the Blue" (17 October 2004)
- Eminem – "Just Lose It" (7 November 2004)
- Gwen Stefani – "What You Waiting For?" (14 November 2004)
- Casey Donovan – "Listen with Your Heart" (5 December 2004)
- Anthony Callea – "The Prayer" (19 December 2004)

=== 2005 ===
- Nitty – "Nasty Girl" (23 January 2005)
- Delta Goodrem and Brian McFadden – "Almost Here" (13 March 2005)
- Anthony Callea – "Rain/Bridge over Troubled Water" (20 March 2005)
- Snoop Dogg featuring Justin Timberlake and Charlie Wilson – "Signs" (1 May 2005)
- The Black Eyed Peas – "Don't Phunk With My Heart" (22 May 2005)
- Gwen Stefani – "Hollaback Girl" (29 May 2005)
- Backstreet Boys – "Incomplete" (19 June 2005)
- Mariah Carey – "We Belong Together" (26 June 2005)
- Akon – "Lonely" (10 July 2005)
- Crazy Frog – "Axel F" (24 July 2005)
- 2Pac featuring Elton John – "Ghetto Gospel" (21 August 2005)
- Pussycat Dolls featuring Busta Rhymes – "Don't Cha" (28 August 2005)
- Shannon Noll – "Shine" (2 October 2005)
- Madonna – "Hung Up" (13 November 2005)
- The Black Eyed Peas – "My Humps" (20 November 2005)
- Kate DeAraugo – "Maybe Tonight" (4 December 2005)
- Lee Harding – "Wasabi!/Eye of the Tiger" (31 December 2005)

=== 2006 ===
- Chris Brown featuring Juelz Santana – "Run It!" (22 January 2006)
- Rihanna – "SOS" (23 April 2006)
- Shakira featuring Wyclef Jean – "Hips Don't Lie" (18 June 2006)
- Justin Timberlake featuring Timbaland– "SexyBack" (20 August 2006)
- U2 and Green Day – "The Saints Are Coming" (12 November 2006)
- Damien Leith – "Night of My Life" (3 December 2006)

=== 2007 ===
- Hinder – "Lips of an Angel" (29 January 2007)
- Silverchair – "Straight Lines" (19 March 2007)
- Missy Higgins – "Steer" (23 April 2007)
- Rihanna featuring Jay-Z – "Umbrella" (2 June 2007)
- Fergie – "Big Girls Don't Cry" (15 July 2007)
- Sean Kingston – "Beautiful Girls" (17 September 2007)
- Delta Goodrem – "In This Life" (24 September 2007)
- Kylie Minogue – "2 Hearts" (19 November 2007)

=== 2009 ===
- Flo Rida featuring Kesha – "Right Round" (23 February 2009)
- Vanessa Amorosi – "This Is Who I Am" (18 October 2009)

=== 2010 ===
- Jason Derülo – "In My Head" (21 February 2010)
- Brian McFadden featuring Kevin Rudolf – "Just Say So" (19 April 2010)
- Rihanna – "Only Girl (In the World)" (27 September 2010)
- P!nk – "Raise Your Glass" (17 October 2010)
- Kesha – "We R Who We R" (7 November 2010)

=== 2011 ===
- Lady Gaga – "Born This Way" (20 February 2011)
- Reece Mastin – "Good Night" (28 November 2011)

=== 2012 ===
- Karise Eden – "Stay With Me Baby" (25 June 2012)
- Reece Mastin – "Shout It Out" (9 July 2012)
- Pink – "Blow Me (One Last Kiss)" (16 July 2012)
- Guy Sebastian featuring Lupe Fiasco – "Battle Scars" (20 August 2012)
- Samantha Jade – "What You've Done to Me" (26 November 2012)

=== 2013 ===
- Baauer – "Harlem Shake" (25 February 2013)
- Jason Derülo featuring 2 Chainz – "Talk Dirty" (19 August 2013)
- Redfoo – "Let's Get Ridiculous" (16 September 2013)
- Dami Im – "Alive" (4 November 2013)
- Taylor Henderson – "Borrow My Heart" (11 November 2013)

=== 2014 ===
- Ed Sheeran – "Sing" (5 May 2014)
- Justice Crew – "Que Sera" (12 May 2014)
- The Veronicas – "You Ruin Me" (29 September 2014)

=== 2015 ===
- One Direction – "Drag Me Down" – (10 August 2015)
- Justin Bieber – "What Do You Mean?" (7 September 2015)
- Adele – "Hello" (2 November 2015)

=== 2016 ===
- Zayn – "Pillowtalk" (8 February 2016)
- Katy Perry – "Rise" (25 July 2016)
- Major Lazer featuring Justin Bieber and MØ – "Cold Water" (1 August 2016)

=== 2017 ===
- Ed Sheeran – "Shape of You" (16 January 2017)
- Harry Styles – "Sign of the Times" (17 April 2017)
- DJ Khaled featuring Justin Bieber, Quavo, Chance the Rapper and Lil Wayne – "I'm the One" (8 May 2017)
- Pink – "What About Us" (21 August 2017)
- Taylor Swift – "Look What You Made Me Do" (4 September 2017)
- Sam Smith – "Too Good at Goodbyes" (18 September 2017)

=== 2018 ===
- Ariana Grande – "No Tears Left to Cry" (30 April 2018)

=== 2019 ===
- Ariana Grande – "7 Rings" (28 January 2019)
- Billie Eilish – "Bad Guy" (8 April 2019)
- Ed Sheeran and Justin Bieber – "I Don't Care" (20 May 2019)

=== 2020 ===
- Taylor Swift – "Cardigan" (3 August 2020)
- Ariana Grande – "Positions" (2 November 2020)
- Taylor Swift – "Willow" (21 December 2020)

=== 2021 ===
- Olivia Rodrigo – "Drivers License" (18 January 2021)
- Ed Sheeran – "Bad Habits" (5 July 2021)
- The Kid Laroi and Justin Bieber – "Stay" (19 July 2021)
- Adele – "Easy on Me" (25 October 2021)
- Taylor Swift – "All Too Well (Taylor's Version)" (19 November 2021)

=== 2022 ===
- Harry Styles – "As It Was" (11 April 2022)
- Jack Harlow – "First Class" (18 April 2022)
- Blackpink – "Pink Venom" (29 August 2022)
- Elton John and Britney Spears – "Hold Me Closer" (5 September 2022)
- Taylor Swift – "Anti-Hero" (31 October 2022)

=== 2023 ===
- Miley Cyrus – "Flowers" (23 January 2023)
- Dave and Central Cee – "Sprinter" (12 June 2023)
- Olivia Rodrigo – "Vampire" (10 July 2023)
- Taylor Swift – "Is It Over Now?" (23 October 2023)
- Jack Harlow – "Lovin on Me" (20 November 2023)

=== 2024 ===
- Taylor Swift featuring Post Malone – "Fortnight" (26 April 2024)
- Post Malone featuring Morgan Wallen – "I Had Some Help" (20 May 2024)
- Eminem – "Houdini" (7 June 2024)
- Charli XCX featuring Billie Eilish – "Guess" (12 August 2024)
- Sabrina Carpenter – "Taste" (2 September 2024)
- Rosé and Bruno Mars – "Apt." (28 October 2024)

=== 2025 ===
- Taylor Swift – "The Fate of Ophelia" (13 October 2025)

=== 2026 ===
- Olivia Rodrigo – "Drop Dead" (27 April 2026)
- Olivia Rodrigo – "The Cure (1 June 2026)
- Taylor Swift – "I Knew It, I Knew You" (15 June 2026)
- Olivia Rodrigo – "Stupid Song" (22 June 2026)
- Taylor Swift – "Patient Zero" (5 October 2026)
- Tate McRae – "Housewife" (26 October 2026)

== Artists with the most cumulative weeks at number-one for singles ==
- The Beatles (130 weeks)
- Elvis Presley (61 weeks)
- Justin Bieber (49 weeks)
- ABBA (42 weeks)
- Madonna (40 weeks)
- Rihanna (39 weeks)
- Taylor Swift (37 Weeks)
- Ed Sheeran (32 weeks)
- Eminem (32 weeks)
- Kylie Minogue (31 weeks)

== Songs with most weeks in the top 100 ==
=== 200 weeks or more ===
- Ed Sheeran – "Perfect" (334 weeks)
- Lewis Capaldi – "Someone You Loved" (295 weeks)
- Post Malone featuring Swae Lee – "Sunflower" (294 weeks)
- The Killers – "Mr Brightside" (253 weeks)
- Fleetwood Mac – "Dreams" (251 weeks)
- Vance Joy – "Riptide" (247 weeks)
- The Weeknd – "Blinding Lights" (243 weeks)
- Ed Sheeran – "Shape of You" (231 weeks)
- Lady Gaga and Bradley Cooper – "Shallow" (216 weeks)
- Glass Animals – "Heat Waves" (214 weeks)

=== 100 weeks or more ===
- The Weeknd – "Save Your Tears" (199 weeks)
- Goo Goo Dolls – "Iris" (197 weeks)
- Dean Lewis – "Be Alright" (194 weeks)
- 5 Seconds Of Summer – "Youngblood" (188 weeks)
- Harry Styles – "Watermelon Sugar" (186 weeks)
- James Arthur – "Say You Won't Let Go" (186 weeks)
- Tones and I – "Dance Monkey" (181 weeks)
- Ed Sheeran – "Thinking Out Loud" (176 weeks)
- Dua Lipa – "Levitating" (171 weeks)
- Post Malone – "Circles" (166 weeks)
- Kings of Leon – "Sex on Fire" (163 weeks)
- Coldplay – "Viva la Vida" (157 weeks)
- Hozier – "Take Me to Church" (150 weeks)
- The Kid Laroi and Justin Bieber – "Stay" (147 weeks)
- J. Cole – "No Role Modelz" (147 weeks)
- Zach Bryan – "Something in the Orange" (146 weeks)
- Dua Lipa – "Don't Start Now" (143 weeks)
- Elton John and Dua Lipa – "Cold Heart (Pnau Remix)" (139 weeks)
- Macklemore and Ryan Lewis featuring Ray Dalton – "Can't Hold Us" (136 weeks)
- The Weeknd featuring Daft Punk – "Starboy" (135 weeks)
- Noah Cyrus – "July" (127 weeks)
- Ed Sheeran – "Bad Habits" (127 weeks)
- Ed Sheeran – "Shivers" (124 weeks)
- Billie Eilish – "Bad Guy" (123 weeks)
- Luke Combs – "When It Rains It Pours" (122 weeks)
- Harry Styles – "As It Was" (120 weeks)
- Morgan Wallen – "Last Night" (116 weeks)
- Miley Cyrus – "Party in the U.S.A." (114 weeks)
- Mark Ronson featuring Bruno Mars – "Uptown Funk" (114 weeks)
- OneRepublic – "Counting Stars" (113 weeks)
- Billie Eilish and Khalid – "Lovely" (112 weeks)
- OneRepublic – "I Ain't Worried" (112 weeks)
- Benny Blanco featuring Halsey and Khalid – "Eastside" (111 weeks)
- Imagine Dragons – "Believer" (111 weeks)
- Taylor Swift – "Cruel Summer" (110 weeks)
- Luke Combs – "Fast Car" (109 weeks)
- Kendrick Lamar – "HUMBLE." (109 weeks)
- Tom Odell – "Another Love" (109 weeks)
- Miley Cyrus – "Flowers" (108 weeks)
- Lewis Capaldi – "Before You Go" (108 weeks)
- Lady Gaga – "Poker Face" (106 weeks)
- Black Eyed Peas – "I Gotta Feeling" (106 weeks)
- Taylor Swift – "Shake It Off" (105 weeks)
- Juice WRLD – "Lucid Dreams" (101 weeks)

=== 75 weeks or more ===
- Post Malone – "I Fall Apart" (99 weeks)
- Post Malone featuring 21 Savage – "Rockstar" (99 weeks)
- Beyoncé – "Single Ladies (Put a Ring on It)" (98 weeks)
- Tate McRae – "Greedy" (97 weeks)
- Ed Sheeran and Justin Bieber – "I Don't Care" (97 weeks)
- Benson Boone – "Beautiful Things" (96 weeks)
- Eminem – "Without Me" (96 weeks)
- Lil Nas X – "Old Town Road" (96 weeks)
- Travis Scott – "Sicko Mode" (95 weeks)
- Joel Corry and MNEK – "Head & Heart" (94 weeks)
- The Neighbourhood – "Sweater Weather" (93 weeks)
- Pharrell Williams – "Happy" (93 weeks)
- Adele – "Rolling in the Deep" (93 weeks)
- Queen – "Bohemian Rhapsody" (93 weeks)
- Luke Combs – "The Kind Of Love We Make" (92 weeks)
- Saint Jhn – "Roses" (92 weeks)
- David Guetta featuring Sia – "Titanium" (92 weeks)
- Regard – "Ride It" (92 weeks)
- John Legend – "All of Me" (92 weeks)
- Kendrick Lamar & SZA – "All the Stars" (91 weeks)
- Gotye featuring Kimbra – "Somebody That I Used to Know" (91 weeks)
- SZA – "Snooze" (91 weeks)
- Flume featuring Kai – "Never Be like You" (91 weeks)
- Ed Sheeran – "Photograph" (91 weeks)
- Katy Perry – "Firework" (91 weeks)
- The Weeknd – "Die for You" (90 weeks)
- Maroon 5 – "Memories" (90 weeks)
- Dasha – "Austin" (89 weeks)
- 24kGoldn featuring Iann Dior – "Mood" (89 weeks)
- LMFAO featuring Lauren Bennett and GoonRock – "Party Rock Anthem" (89 weeks)
- Lady Gaga featuring Colby O'Donis – "Just Dance" (89 weeks)
- Zach Bryan featuring Kacey Musgraves – "I Remember Everything" (88 weeks)
- Luke Combs – "Beautiful Crazy" (88 weeks)
- SZA – "Kill Bill" (88 weeks)
- Hozier – "Too Sweet" (87 weeks)
- The Kid Laroi with Miley Cyrus – "Without You" (87 weeks)
- Ed Sheeran – "Castle on the Hill" (86 weeks)
- George Ezra – "Shotgun" (86 weeks)
- The Chainsmokers featuring Halsey – "Closer" (86 weeks)
- The Chainsmokers & Coldplay – "Something Just Like This" (85 weeks)
- Calum Scott – "Dancing on My Own" (85 weeks)
- Shaboozey – "A Bar Song (Tipsy)" (84 weeks)
- Chappell Roan – "Good Luck, Babe!" (84 weeks)
- Sabrina Carpenter – "Espresso" (84 weeks)
- Olivia Rodrigo – "Drivers License" (84 weeks)
- Adele – "Someone like You" (84 weeks)
- Imagine Dragons – "Thunder" (84 weeks)
- Justin Timberlake – "Can't Stop the Feeling!" (83 weeks)
- Tate McRae – "You Broke Me First" (82 weeks)
- Taio Cruz – "Dynamite" (81 weeks)
- Eminem and Rihanna – "Love The Way You Lie" (81 weeks)
- Major Lazer and DJ Snake featuring MØ – "Lean On" (81 weeks)
- Tones and I – "Never Seen the Rain" (81 weeks)
- Katy Perry – "Hot n Cold" (81 weeks)
- Post Malone feat Morgan Wallen – "I Had Some Help" (80 weeks)
- Myles Smith – "Stargazing" (80 weeks)
- Noah Kahan – "Stick Season" (80 weeks)
- Taylor Swift – "Anti-Hero" (80 weeks)
- Stephen Sanchez and Em Beihold – "Until I Found You" (80 weeks)
- Bruno Mars – "Just the Way You Are" (80 weeks)
- Billie Eilish – "Birds of a Feather" (79 weeks)
- Billie Eilish – "Wildflower" (79 weeks)
- Billie Eilish – "When the Party's Over" (79 weeks)
- Rema and Selena Gomez – "Calm Down" (79 weeks)
- Harry Styles – "Adore You" (79 weeks)
- Olivia Rodrigo – "Good 4 U" (79 weeks)
- Justin Timberlake – "SexyBack" (79 weeks)
- Sia – "Chandelier" (78 weeks)
- Loud Luxury featuring Brando – "Body" (78 weeks)
- Cassö x Raye x D-Block Europe – "Prada" (77 weeks)
- Katy Perry – "Roar" (77 weeks)
- Morgan Wallen – "Thinkin' Bout Me" (76 weeks)
- Teddy Swims – "Lose Control" (76 weeks)
- Foo Fighters – "Everlong" (76 weeks)
- Drake featuring Wizkid and Kyla – "One Dance" (76 weeks)
- Frank Ocean – "Lost" (76 weeks)
- Taylor Swift – "Blank Space" (76 weeks)
- Sam Feldt featuring RANI – "Post Malone" (76 weeks)
- The Presets – "My People" (76 weeks)
- Zach Bryan – "Pink Skies" (75 weeks)
- David Guetta & Bebe Rexha – "I'm Good (Blue)" (75 weeks)
- Doja Cat featuring SZA – "Kiss Me More" (75 weeks)
- LMFAO – "Sexy And I Know It" (75 weeks)
- Christina Perri – "A Thousand Years" (75 weeks)

== Songs with most weeks in the top 50 ==
An asterisk (*) represents that a single is still in the chart

=== 100 weeks or more ===
- Fleetwood Mac – "Dreams" (176 weeks)*
- The Killers – "Mr Brightside" (163 weeks)
- Lewis Capaldi – "Someone You Loved" (159 weeks)
- Glass Animals – "Heat Waves" (156 weeks)
- Zach Bryan – "Something in the Orange" (149 weeks)*
- Vance Joy – "Riptide" (139 weeks)
- The Weeknd – "Blinding Lights" (138 weeks)
- The Weeknd – "Save Your Tears" (133 weeks)
- Dua Lipa – "Levitating" (119 weeks)
- Zach Bryan featuring Kacey Musgraves – "I Remember Everything" (102 weeks)
- Elton John and Dua Lipa – "Cold Heart (Pnau remix)" (100 weeks)
- Tones and I – "Dance Monkey" (100 weeks)

=== 80 weeks or more ===
- Ed Sheeran – "Bad Habits" (99 weeks)
- Goo Goo Dolls – "Iris" (98 weeks)*
- Ed Sheeran – Shivers (97 weeks)
- Harry Styles – "As It Was" (97 weeks)
- The Kid Laroi and Justin Bieber – "Stay" (95 weeks)
- OneRepublic – "I Ain't Worried" (92 weeks)
- Ed Sheeran – "Perfect" (91 weeks)
- Morgan Wallen – "Last Night" (91 weeks)
- Harry Styles – "Watermelon Sugar" (88 weeks)
- Teddy Swims – "Lose Control" (88 weeks)*
- Taylor Swift – "Cruel Summer" (86 weeks)
- Post Malone and Swae Lee – "Sunflower" (85 weeks)
- Benson Boone – "Beautiful Things" (84 weeks)*
- Ed Sheeran – "Shape of You" (81 weeks)

=== 50 weeks or more ===
- Taylor Swift – "Anti-Hero" (77 weeks)
- Luke Combs – "Fast Car" (76 weeks)
- Benny Blanco featuring Halsey and Khalid – "Eastside" (75 weeks)
- Billie Eilish – "Birds of a Feather" (72 weeks)*
- Dua Lipa – "Don't Start Now" (71 weeks)
- Shaboozey – "A Bar Song (Tipsy)" (71 weeks)*
- Noah Kahan – "Stick Season" (70 weeks)
- Post Malone feat Morgan Wallen – "I Had Some Help" (68 weeks)*
- Olivia Rodrigo – "Good 4 U" (67 weeks)
- Hozier – "Too Sweet" (67 weeks)
- Miley Cyrus – "Flowers" (65 weeks)
- Sabrina Carpenter – "Espresso" (65 weeks)
- Luke Combs – "The Kind of Love We Make" (64 weeks)
- Chappell Roan – "Good Luck, Babe!" (63 weeks)
- Billie Eilish – "Bad Guy" (62 weeks)
- Post Malone – "Circles" (62 weeks)
- 24kGoldn & Iann Dior – "Mood" (60 weeks)
- Mariah Carey – "All I Want for Christmas Is You" (59 weeks)
- Myles Smith – "Stargazing" (59 weeks)
- Mark Ronson featuring Bruno Mars – "Uptown Funk" (58 weeks)
- 5 Seconds Of Summer – "Youngblood" (57 weeks)
- Doja Cat featuring SZA – "Kiss Me More" (57 weeks)
- The Kid Laroi with Miley Cyrus – "Without You" (56 weeks)
- Lil Nas X and Jack Harlow – "Industry Baby" (56 weeks)
- Queen – "Bohemian Rhapsody" (56 weeks)
- Lady Gaga and Bradley Cooper – "Shallow" (56 weeks)
- Dasha – "Austin" (56 weeks)
- Lost Frequencies & Calum Scott – "Where Are You Now" (55 weeks)
- Saint Jhn – "Roses" (55 weeks)
- The Weeknd – "Die For You" (54 weeks)
- Justin Bieber – "Ghost" (54 weeks)
- Lady Gaga, Bruno Mars – "Die With A Smile" (54 weeks)*
- Rema and Selena Gomez – "Calm Down" (53 weeks)
- LMFAO featuring Lauren Bennett and GoonRock – "Party Rock Anthem" (53 weeks)
- Lewis Capaldi – "Before You Go" (53 weeks)
- Joel Corry & MNEK – "Head & Heart" (53 weeks)
- Olivia Rodrigo – "Drivers License" (52 weeks)
- Pharrell Williams – "Happy" (52 weeks)
- Sam Smith – "Stay with Me" (52 weeks)
- Billie Eilish and Khalid – "Lovely" (52 weeks)
- Adele – "Rolling in the Deep" (52 weeks)
- Teddy Swims – "The Door" (52 weeks)*
- SZA – "Kill Bill" (51 weeks)
- Adele – "Someone like You" (51 weeks)
- Major Lazer and DJ Snake featuring MØ – "Lean On" (51 weeks)
- Wham! – "Last Christmas" (51 weeks)
- Gotye featuring Kimbra – "Somebody That I Used to Know" (51 weeks)
- Kendrick Lamar & Sza – "All The Stars" (51 weeks)*
- Lil Nas X – "Old Town Road" (50 weeks)
- Dean Lewis – "Be Alright" (50 weeks)
- Kendrick Lamar – "HUMBLE." (50 weeks)
- Gigi Perez – "Sailor Song" (50 weeks)*

== Songs with most weeks at number two ==
Note: This list includes songs that eventually peaked at number one in the chart.

=== Twelve weeks ===
- The Weeknd featuring Daft Punk – "Starboy" (2016–17)
- Ed Sheeran – "Bad Habits" (2021)

=== Eleven weeks ===
- Taylor Swift – "Love Story" (2009)

=== Ten weeks ===
- Maroon 5 featuring Christina Aguilera – "Moves Like Jagger" (2011)
- Dua Lipa – "Don't Start Now" (2019–20)
- Rosé and Bruno Mars – "Apt" (2024)
- Gracie Abrams – "That's So True" (2024)

=== Nine weeks ===
- Camila Cabello featuring Young Thug – "Havana" (2017–18)
- Shawn Mendes and Camila Cabello – "Señorita" (2019)
- Elton John and Dua Lipa – "Cold Heart (Pnau remix)" (2021)
- Olivia Dean – "Man I Need" (2025–26)

=== Eight weeks ===
- Bryan Adams – "Have You Ever Really Loved a Woman?" (1995)
- Ed Sheeran – "Castle on the Hill" (2017)
- Post Malone featuring Ty Dolla Sign – "Psycho" (2018)
- Post Malone – "Circles" (2019)

== Songs spending the most weeks in the top ten ==
=== Over 31 weeks ===
- 87 weeks – Glass Animals – "Heat Waves" (2021–22)
- 69 weeks – Benson Boone – "Beautiful Things" (2024–25)
- 57 weeks – Billie Eilish – "Birds of a Feather" (2024–25)
- 53 weeks – The Kid Laroi and Justin Bieber – "Stay" (2021–22)
- 44 weeks – Ed Sheeran – "Bad Habits" (2021–22)
- 44 weeks – Harry Styles – "As It Was" (2022)
- 43 weeks – Bruno Mars and Lady Gaga – "Die With A Smile" (2024–25)
- 42 weeks – Taylor Swift – "Cruel Summer" (2019–24)
- 41 weeks – Tones and I – "Dance Monkey" (2019–20)
- 41 weeks – Shaboozey – "A Bar Song (Tipsy)" (2024)
- 40 weeks – The Weeknd – "Blinding Lights" (2019–21)
- 40 weeks – Elton John & Dua Lipa – "Cold Heart (Pnau Remix)" (2021–22)
- 37 weeks – Morgan Wallen – "Last Night" (2023)
- 35 weeks – Sabrina Carpenter – "Espresso" (2024)
- 34 weeks – Ed Sheeran – "Shivers" (2021–22)
- 33 weeks – Post Malone featuring Morgan Wallen – "I Had Some Help" (2024)
- 33 weeks – Rosé and Bruno Mars – "Apt." (2024–25)
- 32 weeks – Taylor Swift – "Anti-Hero" (2022–24)
- 31 weeks – Post Malone and Swae Lee – "Sunflower" (2018–19)
- 31 weeks – Dua Lipa – "Levitating" (2020–21)
- 31 weeks – Lil Nas X & Jack Harlow – "Industry Baby" (2021)
- 31 weeks – Gracie Abrams – "That's So True" (2024–25)

=== 22–30 weeks ===
- 29 weeks – Dua Lipa – "Don't Start Now" (2019–20)
- 29 weeks – Tate McRae – "Greedy" (2023)
- 29 weeks – The Kid Laroi with Miley Cyrus - "Without You" (Remix) (2020–21)
- 28 weeks – Post Malone – "Circles" (2019–20)
- 28 weeks – 24kGoldn featuring Iann Dior – "Mood" (2020–21)
- 27 weeks – Lil Nas X – "Old Town Road" (2019)
- 27 weeks – SZA – "Kill Bill" (2022–23)
- 27 weeks – OneRepublic – "I Ain't Worried" (2022–23)
- 27 weeks – Miley Cyrus – "Flowers" (2023)
- 26 weeks – Saint Jhn – "Roses" (2020)
- 26 weeks – Joel Corry featuring MNEK – "Head & Heart" (2020–21)
- 25 weeks – Ed Sheeran – "Perfect" (2017–18)
- 25 weeks – Billie Eilish – "Bad Guy" (2019–20)
- 25 weeks – Doja Cat – "Paint the Town Red" (2023)
- 25 weeks – Mariah Carey – "All I Want For Christmas Is You" (2018–24)
- 24 weeks – ABBA – "Fernando" (1976)
- 24 weeks – The Prodigy – "Breathe" (1996–97)
- 24 weeks – Ed Sheeran – "Shape of You" (2017)
- 24 weeks – Benny Blanco featuring Halsey and Khalid – "Eastside" (2018–19)
- 24 weeks – Luke Combs – "Fast Car" (2023)
- 24 weeks – Alex Warren – "Ordinary" (2025)*
- 23 weeks – The Chainsmokers featuring Halsey – "Closer" (2016–17)
- 23 weeks – George Ezra – "Shotgun" (2018–19)
- 22 weeks – The Beatles – "Hey Jude" (1968–69)
- 22 weeks – Guns N' Roses – "November Rain" (1992–93)
- 22 weeks – TV Rock – "Flaunt It" (2006)
- 22 weeks – Lady Gaga and Bradley Cooper – "Shallow" (2018–19)
- 22 weeks – Olivia Rodrigo – "Good 4 U" (2021)
- 22 weeks – GAYLE – "abcdefu" (2021–22)
- 22 weeks – Sam Smith & Kim Petras – "Unholy" (2022–23)
- 22 weeks – Casso x Raye x D-Block Europe – "Prada" (2023–24)

=== 21 weeks ===
- Ray Parker Jr. – "Ghostbusters" (1984–85)
- Rick Astley – "Never Gonna Give You Up" (1987–88)
- Sandi Thom – "I Wish I Was a Punk Rocker (With Flowers in My Hair)" (2006–07)
- The Black Eyed Peas – "I Gotta Feeling" (2009–2010)
- Katy Perry – "Roar" (2013–14)
- Mark Ronson featuring Bruno Mars – "Uptown Funk" (2014–15)
- Dean Lewis – "Be Alright" (2018)
- DaBaby featuring Roddy Ricch – "Rockstar" (2020)

=== 20 weeks ===
- LMFAO ft. Lauren Bennett & GoonRock – "Party Rock Anthem" (2011)
- Pharrell Williams – "Happy" (2013–14)
- Taylor Swift – "Shake It Off" (2014–15)
- 5 Seconds of Summer – "Youngblood" (2018)
- Halsey – "Without Me" (2018–19)
- Lewis Capaldi – "Someone You Loved" (2019)
- Doja Cat featuring SZA – "Kiss Me More" (2021)
- Sabrina Carpenter – "Taste" (2024)
- Lola Young – "Messy" (2024)
- Chappell Roan – "Pink Pony Club" (2025)

== Biggest drops ==
=== Songs that made the biggest drop in the top fifty (30+ places) ===
- Lady Gaga and Blackpink – "Sour Candy" (15 June 2020) 8→48 (40 places)
- Paul "The Chief" Harragon – "That's Gold" (10 September 2007) 8→47 (39 places)
- Kanye West featuring Paul McCartney – "Only One" (26 January 2015) 8→44 (36 places)
- Karise Eden – "Hallelujah" (2 July 2012) 2→38 (36 places)
- Jai Waetford – "Your Eyes" (24 November 2013) 6→41 (35 places)
- Sarah De Bono – "Beautiful" (2 July 2012) 4→37 (33 places)
- Kylie Minogue – "Timebomb" (18 June 2012) 12→44 (32 places)
- Taylor Swift – "Seven" (10 August 2020) 16→48 (32 places)
- Joel Turner and the Modern Day Poets – "Funk U Up" (23 May 2005) 13→44 (31 places)
- Taylor Henderson – "Girls Just Want to Have Fun" (17 November 2013) 15→46 (31 places)
- The Weeknd – "After Hours" (2020) 17→48 (31 places)
- Kylie Mole – "So Excellent-I Go I Go" (15 January 1989) 19→49 (30 places)
- Timomatic – "Can You Feel It" (20 August 2012) 18→48 (30 places)
- Taylor Swift – "Invisible String" (10 August 2020) 19→49 (30 places)
- Taylor Swift – "Run" (29 November 2021) 19→49 (30 places)

=== Songs that made the biggest drop in the top hundred (45+ places) ===
- Mariah Carey – "All I Want for Christmas Is You" (2018) 1→100+ (100+ places)
- Francesca – "Way of the World" (2002) 3→100+ (97+ places)
- Karise Eden – "I Was Your Girl" (2012) 3→100+ (97+ places)
- Darren Percival – "Damage Down" (2012) 8→100+ (92+ places)
- Karise Eden – "Nothing Real But Love" (2012) 11→100+ (89+ places)
- Boyz II Men – "Pass You By" (2000) 13→100+ (87+ places)
- Mariah Carey – "All I Want for Christmas Is You" (1995) 15→100+ (85+ places)
- Karise Eden – "Landslide" (2012) 15→100+ (85+ places)
- Darren Percival – "For Once in My Life" (2012) 17→100+ (83+ places)
- Delta Goodrem – "Think About You" (2018) 19→100+ (81+ places)
- Karise Eden – "It's a Man's World" (2012) 21→100+ (79+ places)
- Justin Bieber – "Turn to Me" (2012) 25→100+ (75+ places)
- Cyrus Villaneuva – "Wicked Game" (2015) 6→81 (75 places)
- Nirvana – "About a Girl" (1994) 4→76 (72 places)
- Rachael Leahcar – "Shooting Star" (2012) 31→100+ (69 places)
- Rachael Leahcar – "Smile" (2012) 34→100+ (66 places)
- James Kannis – "Love 2 Love" (2006) 35→100+ (65+ places)
- Psycho Teddy – "Psycho Teddy (Do You Really Really Want To?)" – (2008) 5→70 (65 places)
- Karise Eden – "Back to Black" (2012) 36→100+ (64+ places)
- Ricki-Lee – "Don't Miss You" (2009) 24→87 (63 places)
- Karise Eden – "Hallelujah" (2012) 38→100+ (62+ places)
- Starley – "Call on Me" (2017) 38→100+ (62+ places)
- Ben Hazlewood – "I'm With You" (2012) 41→100+ (59+ places)
- Nicki Minaj – "Barbie Tingz" (2018) 41→100+ (59+ places)
- Marcia Hines and Deni Hines – "Stomp" (2006) 43→100+ (57+ places)
- Sarah De Bono – "Here's Where I Stand" (2012) 43→100+ (57+ places)
- Rachael Leahcar – "Nights in White Satin" (2012) 32→89 (57 places)
- Karise Eden – "Stay With Me Baby" (2012) 1→54 (54 places)
- Jes Hudak – "Different Worlds" (2012) 47→100+ (53+ places)
- Adam Martin – "Romeo and Juliet" (2012) 50→100 (50+ places)
- Sarah De Bono – "If I Didn't Love You" (2012) 50→100+ (50+ places)
- Sarah De Bono – "No Shame" (2012) 50→100+ (50+ places)
- Brittany Cairns – "Different Worlds" (2012) 15→64 (49 places)
- BTS featuring Desiigner – "Mic Drop" (2017) 50→99 (49 places)
- Darren Percival – "A Song for You" (2012) 52→100+ (48+ places)
- Ricki Lee Coulter – "Crazy" (2012) 52→100+ (48+ places) ("Crazy" returned to the top 100 to peak at 46 the following week.)
- The Cat Empire – "No Longer There" (2007) 12→58 (46 places)
- Karise Eden – "Stay With Me Baby" (2012) 54→100+ (46+ places)
- Backstreet Boys – "Straight Through My Heart" (2009) 54→99 (45 places)
- Fatai V – "Ave Maria" (2012) 55→100+ (45 places)
- Diana Rouvas – "I Can't Make You Love Me" (2012) 32→77 (45 places)

== Songs that made the biggest jump in the top fifty (30+ places) ==
- Britney Spears – "3" (2009) 50→7 (43 places)
- George Michael – "Too Funky" (1992) 50→8 (42 places)
- Paul Lekakis – "Boom Boom (Let's Go Back To My Room)" (1987) 49→7 (42 places)
- A Great Big World and Christina Aguilera – "Say Something" (2014) 50→9 (41 places)
- Avicii featuring Aloe Blacc – "Wake Me Up!" (2013) 42→2 (40 places)
- No Mercy – "Where Do You Go" (1996) 50→10 (40 places)
- Avicii – "The Days" (2014) 50→10 (40 places)
- Ed Sheeran – "Afterglow" (2021) 47→7 (40 places)
- Vanessa Amorosi – "Absolutely Everybody" (1999) – 45→7 (38 places)
- Belinda Carlisle – "Heaven Is a Place on Earth" (1988) – 47→9 (38 places)
- Wham! – "Wake Me Up Before You Go-Go" (1984) 50→13 (37 places)
- Madonna – "This Used to Be My Playground" (1992) 50→13 (37 places)
- Sinéad O'Connor – "Nothing Compares 2 U" (1990) 37→1 (36 places)
- Rudimental featuring Ed Sheeran – "Lay It All on Me" (2015) 47→11 (36 places)
- Beyoncé – "Texas Hold 'Em" (2024) 38→3 (35 places)
- INXS – "I Send a Message" (1984) 42→7 (35 places)
- Calvin Harris featuring Ellie Goulding – "Outside" (2014) 49→14 (35 places)
- Calum Scott – "Dancing on My Own" (2016) 45→10 (35 places)
- The Grid – "Swamp Thing" (1994) 43→9 (34 places)
- Bill Medley and Jennifer Warnes – "(I've Had) The Time of My Life" (1988) 47→13 (34 places)
- Guns N' Roses – "November Rain" (1992) 41→7 (34 places)
- Wa Wa Nee – "I Could Make You Love Me" (1986) 48→14 (34 places)
- Bruno Mars – "The Lazy Song" (2011) 44→10 (34 places)
- Internet Money and Gunna featuring Don Toliver and Nav – "Lemonade" (2020) 47→13 (34 places)
- Chappell Roan – "Good Luck, Babe!" (2025) 45→11 (34 places)
- Crowded House – "Better Be Home Soon" (1988) 36→3 (33 places)
- Queen – "Bohemian Rhapsody" (1992) 45→12 (33 places)
- Stan Walker – "Choose You" (2010) 49→16 (33 places)
- Bruno Mars – "Just the Way You Are" (2010) 43→10 (33 places)
- fun. – "Some Nights" (2012) 46→13 (33 places)
- Meghan Trainor – "All About That Bass" (2014) 36→3 (33 places)
- Billie Eilish – "When the Party's Over" (2019) 40→7 (33 places)
- INXS – "Original Sin" (1983) 41→9 (32 places)
- Red Hot Chili Peppers – "Soul To Squeeze" (1993) 46→14 (32 places)
- Ace of Base – "The Sign" (1994) 41→9 (32 places)
- Westlife – "You Raise Me Up" (2006) 40→8 (32 places)
- Psycho Teddy – "Psycho Teddy (Do You Really Really Want To?)" (2008) 44→12 (32 places)
- The Temper Trap – "Sweet Disposition" (2009) 48→16 (32 places)
- 24kGoldn – "Mood" (2020) 36→4 (32 places)
- Madonna – "True Blue" (1986) 45→14 (31 places)
- Michael Jackson – "The Way You Make Me Feel" (1988) 47→16 (31 places)
- Rihanna featuring Ne-Yo – "Hate That I Love You" (2007) 49→18 (31 places)
- The Black Eyed Peas – "Meet Me Halfway" (2009) 50→19 (31 places)
- Shawn Mendes – "Treat You Better" (2016) 45→14 (31 places)
- Jonas Blue featuring JP Cooper – "Perfect Strangers" (2016) 42→11 (31 places)
- The Weeknd – "After Hours" (2020) 48→17 (31 places)
- Tommy Richman - "Million Dollar Baby" (2024) 33→2 (31 places)
- Dean Martin - "Let it Snow! Let it Snow! Let it Snow!" (2024) 43→12 (31 places)
- Teddy Swims – "Lose Control" (2025) 44→13 (31 places)
- ABBA – "Dancing Queen" (1976) 38→8 (30 places)
- Eurythmics – "Missionary Man" (1986) 49→19 (30 places)
- Alice Cooper – "Poison" (1989) 49→19 (30 places)
- Sting – "We'll Be Together" (1987) 50→20 (30 places)
- Kylie Minogue – "Confide in Me" (1994) 31→1 (30 places)
- Glee Cast – "Halo/Walking on Sunshine" (2009) 40→10 (30 places)
- Jay Sean featuring Lil Wayne – "Hit The Lights" (2011) 48→18 (30 places)
- Ed Sheeran – "Lego House" (2012) 49→19 (30 places)
- Rudimental – "Feel the Love" (2012) 42→12 (30 places)
- Rihanna – "Don't Stop the Music" (2008) 31→1 (30 places)
- Macklemore & Ryan Lewis featuring Mary Lambert – Same Love (2013) 39→9 (30 places)
- Klingande – "Jubel" (2014) 41→11 (30 places)
- The Script – "Superheroes" (2014) 39→9 (30 places)
- James Bay – "Hold Back the River" (2015) 43→13 (30 places)
- Gigi Perez – "Sailor Song" (2025) 42→12 (30 places)

== Songs that made the biggest jump in the top hundred (50+ places) ==
- David Bowie & Mick Jagger – "Dancing in the Street" (1985) 97→3 (94 places)
- Silverchair – "Pure Massacre" (1995) 92→2 (90 places)
- Spacey Jane – "Booster Seat" (2021) 94→8 (86 places)
- Ocean Alley – "Confidence" (2019) 93→9 (84 places)
- Gabrielle Aplin – "Please Don't Say You Love Me" (2014) 86→3 (83 places)
- Madonna – "Angel/Into the Groove" (1985) 99→17 (82 places)
- The Incredible Penguins – "Happy Xmas (War Is Over)" (1985) 90→10 (80 places)
- Alice Deejay – "Back in My Life" (2000) 96→19 (77 places)
- Band Aid – "Do They Know It's Christmas?" (1984) 94→17 (77 places)
- Paloma Faith – "Only Love Can Hurt Like This" (2014) 82→7 (75 places)
- Jessie J – "Masterpiece" (2015) 91→18 (73 places)
- Glee Cast – Poker Face (2010) 97→25 (72 places)
- Hampton The Hampster – "Thank God I'm A Country Boy" (2001) 90→20 (70 places)
- Coldplay – Yellow (2000) 83→14 (69 places)
- Los Lobos – La Bamba (1987) 92→24 (68 places)
- Eminem – "The Real Slim Shady" (2000) 95→27 (68 places)
- Lady Gaga – "Poker Face" (2008) 94→26 (68 places)
- Jessica Mauboy – "This Ain't Love" (2015) 75→8 (67 places)
- Luis Fonsi and Daddy Yankee featuring Justin Bieber – "Despacito" (2017) 93→26 (67 places)
- Queen – "Bohemian Rhapsody" (2018) 92→26 (66 places)
- Nine Inch Nails – "The Day The World Went Away" (1999) 95→31 (64 places)
- Billy Joel – "It's Still Rock and Roll to Me" (1980) 99→36 (63 places)
- Beyoncé – "Halo" (2009) 92→29 (63 places)
- Metallica – "The Day That Never Comes" (2008) 81→18 (63 places)
- Chrystal – "The Days - NOTION Remix" (2025) 81→18 (63 places)
- Survivor – "Eye of the Tiger" (1982) 93→31 (62 places)
- Royal Philharmonic Orchestra – "Hooked On Classics" (1981) 87→25 (62 places)
- Taylor Swift – "Love Story" (2009) 100→38 (62 places)
- The Killers – "Mr Brightside" (2004) 88→26 (62 places)
- Taylor Swift – "Cruel Summer" (2019) 94→32 (62 places)
- Little River Band – "The Other Guy" (1983) 89→28 (61 places)
- Roxette – "Dressed For Success" (1989) 89→28 (61 places)
- Candice Alley – "Before You Go" (2007) 85→24 (61 places)
- Diana Ross & Lionel Richie – "Endless Love" (1981) 87→27 (60 places)
- TLC – "Dear Lie" (2000) 97→37 (60 places)
- Destiny's Child – "Soldier" (2005) 63→3 (60 places)
- Jinn – "Part A" (2006) 92→32 (60 places)
- Hanumankind featuring Kalmi – Big Dawgs (2005) 74→15 (59 places)
- Wiz Khalifa featuring Charlie Puth – "See You Again" (2015) 59→1 (58 places)
- Joan Jett & The Blackhearts – "I Love Rock 'n' Roll" (1982) 84→26 (58 places)
- Electric Light Orchestra – "Hold On Tight" (1981) 90→32 (58 places)
- Enrique Iglesias featuring Ludacris – "Tonight (I'm Lovin' You)" (2011) 61→3 (58 places)
- Mariah Carey – "All I Want for Christmas Is You" (2021) 76→18 (58 places)
- The White Stripes – "7 Nation Army" (2003) 74→17 (57 places)
- Luke Combs – "Fast Car" (2023) 91→34 (57 places)
- Sheena Easton – "Morning Train (9 to 5)" (1981) 85→30 (55 places)
- Phil Collins – "In the Air Tonight" (1981) 93→38 (55 places)
- DJ Sammy featuring Yanou & Do – "Heaven" (2002) 77→22 (55 places)
- Demi Lovato – "Sorry Not Sorry" (2017) 90→35 (55 places)
- Travis Scott featuring Playboi Carti – "Fe!n" (2024) 98→43 (55 places)
- Fleetwood Mac – "Dreams" (1977) 78→23 (55 places)
- Queen – "Bohemian Rhapsody" (1992) – 99→45 (54 places)
- Cardi B, Bad Bunny and J Balvin – "I Like It" (2018) – 79→25 (54 places)
- The Ronettes – "Sleigh Ride" (2020) 90→36 (54 places)
- Eminem – "Beautiful" (2009) – 100→47 (53 places)
- Tonite Only – "We Run The Nite" (2011) 99→46 (53 places)
- Frank Sinatra – "Let It Snow! Let It Snow! Let It Snow!" (2020) 99→46 (53 places)
- Jessie J – "Nobody's Perfect" (2011) 76→24 (52 places)
- Lady Gaga – "LoveGame" (2009) 92→41 (51 places)
- Snoop Dogg and David Guetta – "Sweat" (2011) 60→9 (51 places)
- Ed Sheeran – "Bloodstream" (2015) 58→7 (51 places)
- Ed Sheeran – "Visiting Hours" (2021) 80→29 (51 places)
- Goo Goo Dolls – "Iris" (1998) 82→31 (51 places)
- Sam Clark – "Broken" (2010) – 100→50 (50 places)
- Imagine Dragons & JID – "Enemy" (2021) – 85→35 (50 places)
- Myles Smith – "Stargazing" (2024) – 69→19 (50 places)
- Noah Kahan – "Stick Season" (2022) – 70→20 (50 places)

== Self-replacement at number one on singles chart ==
- The Beatles
  - "I Want to Hold Your Hand" (seven weeks) → "I Saw Her Standing There"/"Love Me Do" (seven weeks) (15 February 1964) → "Roll Over Beethoven"/"Hold Me Tight" (two weeks) (4 April 1964) → All My Loving EP (three weeks) (18 April 1964) → "Can't Buy Me Love"/"You Can't Do That" (five weeks) (9 May 1964)
  - "Can't Buy Me Love"/"You Can't Do That" (one week) → Requests (EP): "Long Tall Sally"/"Boys"/"I Call Your Name" (one week) (4 July 1964)
  - "A Hard Day's Night"/"Things We Said Today" (six weeks) → "I Should Have Known Better"/"If I Fell" (five weeks) (5 September 1964)
  - "Rock and Roll Music"/"Honey Don't" (four weeks) → "Ticket to Ride"/"Yes It Is" (three weeks) (1 May 1965)
- ABBA – "I Do, I Do, I Do, I Do, I Do" (three weeks) → "Mamma Mia" (ten weeks) (3 November 1975) → "SOS" (one week) (12 January 1976)
- Madonna – "Angel"/"Into the Groove" (four weeks) → "Crazy for You" (four weeks) (22 July 1985)
- The Black Eyed Peas – "Boom Boom Pow" (six weeks) → "I Gotta Feeling" (seven weeks) (29 June 2009)
- Macklemore and Ryan Lewis – "Thrift Shop" (featuring Wanz) (seven weeks) → "Same Love" (featuring Mary Lambert) (four weeks) (21 January 2013)
- Pharrell Williams – "Get Lucky" (Daft Punk featuring Pharrell Williams) (one week) → "Blurred Lines" (Robin Thicke featuring Pharrell Williams and T.I.) (eight weeks) (13 May 2013)
- Justin Bieber – "I'm the One" (DJ Khaled featuring Justin Bieber, Quavo, Chance the Rapper and Lil Wayne) (two weeks) → "Despacito" (Luis Fonsi and Daddy Yankee featuring Justin Bieber) (thirteen weeks) (22 May 2017)
- Drake – "God's Plan" (eleven weeks) → "Nice for What" (two non-consecutive weeks) (23 April 2018)
- Billie Eilish – "Guess" (Charli XCX featuring Billie Eilish) (one week) → "Birds of a Feather" (one week) (19 August 2024)
- Olivia Dean – "Man I Need" (nineteen weeks) → "Rein Me In" (with Sam Fender) (one week) (6 April 2026)

== Non-English number one songs ==
- Domenico Modugno – "Nel blu dipinto di blu (Volare)" (Italian – seven weeks) (25 October 1958)
- Kyu Sakamoto – "Sukiyaki" (Japanese – two weeks) (13 July 1963)
- Nena – "99 Luftballons" (German – five weeks) (2 April 1984)
- Los Lobos – "La Bamba" (Spanish – seven weeks) (28 September 1987)
- Los del Río – "Macarena" (Spanish/English – nine weeks) (31 August 1996)
- Ricky Martin – "María" (Spanish – six weeks) (21 June 1998) alongside "The Cup of Life" (English)
- Las Ketchup – "The Ketchup Song (Aserejé)" (Spanish – three weeks) (13 October 2002)
- Psy – "Gangnam Style" (Korean/English – six weeks) (1 October 2012)
- Luis Fonsi and Daddy Yankee featuring Justin Bieber – "Despacito" (Spanish/English – thirteen weeks) (22 May 2017)
- Blackpink – "Pink Venom" (Korean/English – one week) (29 August 2022)
- Rosé and Bruno Mars – "Apt" (Korean/English – fourteen weeks) (first reached number one on 28 October 2024)
- Huntrix – "Golden" (Korean/English – Ten Weeks) (4 August 2025)

== Most runs at number one ==
=== Singles ===
Five

- Ella Langley – "Choosin' Texas" (18–25 May 2026; 8 June 2026; and 6 July – 17 August 2026, 31 August – 28 September, 12 October)

Four:

- Rosé and Bruno Mars – "Apt" (28 October 2024 – 11 November 2024; 2 December 2024 – 23 December 2024; 6 January 2025 – 27 January 2025; and 3 March 2025 – 17 March 2025)

Three:

- LMFAO – "Sexy and I Know It" (17–21 October 2011; 12 December 2011; and 2–9 January 2012)
- Flo Rida – "Right Round" (23 February 2009 – 16 March 2009; 30 March 2009; and 13–20 April 2009)
- Sam Fender and Olivia Dean – "Rein Me In" (6 April 2026; 20 April 2026; and 4 May 2026)

=== Albums ===
Seven

- The Art of Loving (6 October 2025, 15 December – 19 January 2026, 9 February 2026, 23 February 2026, 9 March 2026, 13–27 April 2026 and 12-19 October 2026)

Six

- 21 (2 May - 23 May 2011,13 June - 22 August 2011, 5 September - 24 October 2011, 9 January 2012 - 30 January 2012, 20 February 2012 - 12 March 2012 and 14 May 2012)

Five

- You Seem Pretty Sad for a Girl So in Love (22 June 2026 – 6 July 2026, 20 July, 17 August, 21 September and 16 November)

Four:

- KPop Demon Hunters (soundtrack) (14 July 2025 – 4 August 2025; 18 August 2025 – 1 September 2025, 15 September 2025 – 29 September 2025)

== Albums with most weeks at number one ==
76 weeks

- Soundtrack – The Sound of Music (soundtrack) (1965–1967)

34 weeks

- Dire Straits – Brothers in Arms (1985–1986)

32 weeks

- Adele – 21 (2011–2012)

30 weeks

- The Beatles – Sgt. Pepper's Lonely Hearts Club Band (1967–1968)

29 weeks

- Neil Diamond – Hot August Night (1973–1974)
- Delta Goodrem – Innocent Eyes (2003–2004)

28 weeks

- Original Australian Broadway cast – Hair (1969)

27 weeks

- Ed Sheeran – ÷ (2017–2018)

25 weeks

- John Farnham – Whispering Jack (1986–1987)

20 weeks

- Shania Twain – Come On Over (1997–1999)

== Albums with most weeks in Top 100 chart (since 1988; over 100 weeks or 2 years) ==
Source and notes: (Note: Richard Clayderman's Reveries album spent 178 weeks in the Australian Top 100 from December 1980; The Original Cast Recording of Jesus Christ Superstar spent 141 weeks in the Top 100 (from December 1970); Dire Straits' Love over Gold spent 140 weeks from October 1982) (Note: Other notable long-stayers from a soundtrack pre-ARIA days: Grease (OST), The Phantom of the Opera (London Cast Recording), The Rocky Horror Picture Show (Original Cast Recording/Soundtrack))

=== 300 weeks or more ===
- 616 weeks INXS – The Very Best (2011)
- 551 weeks Red Hot Chili Peppers – Greatest Hits (2003)
- 545 weeks Adele – 21 (2011)
- 517 weeks Fleetwood Mac – The Very Best of Fleetwood Mac (2002)
- 509 weeks Cold Chisel – The Best Of Cold Chisel: All For You (2011)
- 504 weeks Taylor Swift – 1989 (2014)
- 484 weeks Fleetwood Mac – Rumours (1977)
- 480 weeks Guns N' Roses – Greatest Hits (2004)
- 477 weeks Bon Jovi – Greatest Hits (2010)
- 466 weeks Ed Sheeran – x (2014)
- 449 weeks Queen – Greatest Hits (1981)
- 439 weeks Eminem – Curtain Call: The Hits (2005)
- 437 weeks Nirvana – Nevermind (1991)
- 433 weeks Guns N' Roses – Appetite For Destruction (1987)
- 433 weeks Foo Fighters – Greatest Hits (2009)
- 422 weeks Katy Perry – Teenage Dream: The Complete Confection (2012)
- 416 weeks Ed Sheeran – + (2011)
- 410 weeks Adele – 25 (2015)
- 397 weeks Bruno Mars – Doo-Wops & Hooligans (2010)
- 381 weeks Ed Sheeran – ÷ (2017)
- 367 weeks Maroon 5 – Singles (2015)
- 345 weeks Taylor Swift – Reputation (2017)
- 335 weeks Eminem – The Eminem Show (2002)
- 334 weeks Dua Lipa – Dua Lipa (2017)
- 329 weeks Michael Jackson – The Essential Michael Jackson (2005)
- 328 weeks Post Malone – Stoney (2016)
- 327 weeks Luke Combs – This One's For You (2017)
- 315 weeks Elton John – Diamonds (2017)
- 312 weeks Arctic Monkeys – AM (2013)
- 307 weeks Green Day – Greatest Hits: God's Favorite Band (2017)

=== 200 weeks or more ===
- 299 weeks Metallica – Metallica (1991)
- 297 weeks Lady Gaga – The Fame (2008)
- 296 weeks Queen – Bohemian Rhapsody: The Original Soundtrack (2018)
- 295 weeks ABBA – ABBA Gold – Greatest Hits (1992)
- 293 weeks Post Malone – Beerbongs and Bentleys (2018)
- 291 weeks Fleetwood Mac – Greatest Hits (1988)
- 286 weeks Billie Eilish – Don't Smile at Me (2017)
- 284 weeks P!nk – Greatest Hits...So Far!!! (2010)
- 281 weeks Travis Scott – Astroworld (2018)
- 281 weeks Drake – Scorpion (2018)
- 277 weeks Crowded House – The Very Very Best Of Crowded House (2010)
- 273 weeks Billie Eilish – When We All Fall Asleep, Where Do We Go? (2019)
- 271 weeks Van Morrison – The Best of Van Morrison (1990)
- 269 weeks Kendrick Lamar – Good Kid, M.A.A.D City (2012)
- 269 weeks XXXTentacion – ? (2018)
- 266 weeks Lewis Capaldi – Divinely Uninspired to a Hellish Extent (2019)
- 262 weeks Soundtrack – The Greatest Showman (2017)
- 262 weeks Soundtrack – The Phantom of the Opera (1987)
- 255 weeks The Weeknd – Starboy (2016)
- 252 weeks Taylor Swift – Lover (2019)
- 249 weeks Meat Loaf – Bat Out Of Hell (1977)
- 246 weeks Soundtrack – Guardians Of The Galaxy: Awesome Mix Vol. 1 (2014)
- 245 weeks Soundtrack – Frozen (2013)
- 244 weeks Kendrick Lamar – DAMN. (2017)
- 241 weeks Luke Combs – What You See Is What You Get (2019)
- 240 weeks Harry Styles – Harry Styles (2017)
- 237 weeks Khalid – American Teen (2017)
- 236 weeks Harry Styles – Fine Line (2019)
- 232 weeks The Eagles – The Very Best of the Eagles (1994)
- 229 weeks The Wiggles – The Best Of The Wiggles (2016)
- 226 weeks U2 – The Best of 1980–1990 (1998)
- 224 weeks Coldplay – Live in Buenos Aires (2018)
- 222 weeks Vance Joy – Dream Your Life Away (2014)
- 221 weeks Dua Lipa – Future Nostalgia (2020)
- 219 weeks The Weeknd – After Hours (2020)
- 218 weeks Creedence Clearwater Revival – 21st Anniversary: The Ultimate Collection (24 Classic Hits) (1989)
- 215 weeks Enya – Watermark (1988)
- 212 weeks Madonna – The Immaculate Collection (1990)
- 210 weeks P!nk – I'm Not Dead (2006)
- 205 weeks Amy Winehouse – Back To Black (2006)
- 204 weeks Taylor Swift – Folklore (2020)
- 202 weeks Post Malone – Hollywood's Bleeding (2019)
- 201 weeks Hilltop Hoods – Drinking From The Sun, Walking Under Stars Restrung (2016)

=== 150 weeks or more ===
- 197 weeks Pitbull – Greatest Hits (2017)
- 195 weeks Pop Smoke – Shoot for the Stars, Aim for the Moon (2020)
- 194 weeks Creedence Clearwater Revival – Chronicle: The 20 Greatest Hits (1976)
- 194 weeks Soundtrack – Moana (2016)
- 193 weeks Neil Diamond – Hot August Night (1972)
- 192 weeks Pearl Jam – Ten (1991)
- 191 weeks Bob Marley and the Wailers – Legend (1984)
- 190 weeks Dr. Dre – 2001 (1999)
- 188 weeks Michael Bublé – Michael Bublé (2003)
- 187 weeks Lana Del Rey – Born to Die (2012)
- 182 weeks Norah Jones – Come Away With Me (2002)
- 180 weeks Morgan Wallen – Dangerous: The Double Album (2021)
- 180 weeks Ed Sheeran – No.6 Collaborations Project (2019)
- 180 weeks Taylor Swift – Fearless (2008)
- 178 weeks Tame Impala – Currents (2015)
- 178 weeks Elton John – Rocket Man: The Definitive Hits (2007)
- 177 weeks Michael Jackson – Thriller (1982)
- 176 weeks The Weeknd – The Highlights (2021)
- 174 weeks Taylor Swift – evermore (2020)
- 174 weeks Andrea Bocelli – Romanza (1997)
- 171 weeks Rihanna – Good Girl Gone Bad (2007)
- 171 weeks Jason Derulo – Platinum Hits (2016)
- 171 weeks The Beatles – 1 (2000)
- 170 weeks Kanye West – My Beautiful Dark Twisted Fantasy (2010)
- 170 weeks Crowded House – Recurring Dream: The Very Best of Crowded House (1996)
- 168 weeks Elton John – The Very Best of Elton John (1990)
- 166 weeks Tyler, the Creator – IGOR (2019)
- 165 weeks Live – Throwing Copper (1994)
- 165 weeks Shania Twain – Come On Over (1997)
- 164 weeks Coldplay – A Rush of Blood to the Head (2002)
- 164 weeks Florence + the Machine – Lungs (2009)
- 162 weeks Justin Bieber – Purpose (2015)
- 161 weeks Olivia Rodrigo – SOUR (2021)
- 160 weeks Led Zeppelin – Led Zeppelin Remasters (1990)
- 159 weeks AC/DC – AC/DC Live (1992)
- 158 weeks Dean Lewis – A Place We Knew (2019)
- 154 weeks Bruce Springsteen – Greatest Hits (1995)
- 154 weeks Cold Chisel – Chisel (1991)
- 152 weeks Pink Floyd – The Dark Side Of The Moon (1973)
- 151 weeks Billie Eilish – Happier Than Ever (2021)
- 151 weeks Robbie Williams – Swing When You're Winning (2001)
- 150 weeks Queen – The Platinum Collection (2000)

=== 125 weeks or more ===
- 149 weeks Linkin Park – Hybrid Theory (2000)
- 149 weeks The Kid Laroi – F*ck Love (2020)
- 146 weeks Jeff Buckley – Grace (1994)
- 146 weeks Alanis Morissette – Jagged Little Pill (1995)
- 145 weeks Moby – Play (1999)
- 144 weeks John Farnham – Whispering Jack (1986)
- 144 weeks Phil Collins – ...Hits (1998)
- 142 weeks Michael Bublé – It's Time (2005)
- 141 weeks Red Hot Chili Peppers – Californication (1999)
- 141 weeks James Blunt – Back to Bedlam (2004)
- 141 weeks Bon Jovi – Cross Road (1994)
- 140 weeks Kings of Leon – Only by the Night (2008)
- 140 weeks Nirvana – MTV Unplugged in New York (1994)
- 140 weeks Enya – Shepherd Moons (1991)
- 139 weeks Adele – 19 (2008)
- 139 weeks Matchbox Twenty – Yourself or Someone Like You (1996)
- 138 weeks Michael Jackson – HIStory: Past, Present and Future, Book I (1995)
- 137 weeks Robbie Williams – Greatest Hits (2004)
- 136 weeks Taylor Swift – Red (Taylor's Version) (2021)
- 136 weeks Doja Cat – Planet Her (2021)
- 136 weeks The Killers – Hot Fuss (2004)
- 135 weeks Cardi B – Invasion of Privacy (2018)
- 135 weeks P!nk – M!ssundaztood (2001)
- 135 weeks Jimi Hendrix – The Ultimate Experience (1992)
- 134 weeks Linkin Park – Meteora (2003)
- 133 weeks Juice Wrld – Goodbye & Good Riddance (2018)
- 131 weeks Mumford & Sons – Sigh No More (2009)
- 129 weeks Cat Stevens – The Very Best of Cat Stevens (1990)
- 129 weeks Red Hot Chilli Peppers – Blood Sugar Sex Magik (1991)
- 128 weeks Doja Cat – Hot Pink (2019)
- 128 weeks Michael Jackson – Dangerous (1991)
- 128 weeks Robbie Williams – Sing When You're Winning (2000)
- 127 weeks Soundtrack – Pulp Fiction (1994)
- 127 weeks Pink – Funhouse (2008)
- 127 weeks Pete Murray – Feeler (2003)
- 125 weeks SZA – Ctrl (2017)
- 125 weeks Taylor Swift – Fearless (Taylor's Version) (2021)

=== 110 weeks or more ===
- 124 weeks Drake – Certified Lover Boy (2021)
- 124 weeks U2 – The Joshua Tree (1987)
- 124 weeks Powderfinger – Odyssey Number Five (2000)
- 123 weeks INXS – Kick (1987)
- 123 weeks Soundtrack – Grease (1978)
- 123 weeks Dido – No Angel (1999)
- 123 weeks Soundtrack – Beaches: Original Soundtrack Recording (1988)
- 122 weeks Powderfinger – Internationalist (1998)
- 122 weeks Def Leppard – Hysteria (1987)
- 121 weeks Shawn Mendes – Shawn Mendes (2018)
- 120 weeks Michael Jackson – Number Ones (2003)
- 120 weeks Eminem – The Marshall Mathers LP (2000)
- 119 weeks The Weeknd – Beauty Behind the Madness (2015)
- 119 weeks Justin Bieber – Justice (2021)
- 119 weeks Taylor Swift – Red (2012)
- 119 weeks Shawn Mendes – Illuminate (2016)
- 119 weeks Ariana Grande – Dangerous Woman (2016)
- 119 weeks Coldplay – X&Y (2005)
- 119 weeks Jet – Get Born (2003)
- 118 weeks Jimmy Barnes – Barnes Hits Anthology (1996)
- 118 weeks Soundtrack – Suicide Squad: The Album (2016)
- 118 weeks The Doors – The Best of The Doors (2000)
- 117 weeks Imagine Dragons – Evolve (2017)
- 116 weeks Bruce Springsteen – Born in the U.S.A. (1984)
- 116 weeks Neil Young – Greatest Hits (2004)
- 115 weeks Guns N' Roses – Use Your Illusion II (1991)
- 115 weeks Kasey Chambers – The Captain (1999)
- 115 weeks Nickelback – All the Right Reasons (2005)
- 115 weeks The Offspring – Smash (1994)
- 115 weeks The Smashing Pumpkins – Siamese Dream (1993)
- 114 weeks Spacey Jane – Sunlight (2020)
- 114 weeks Spice Girls – Spice (1996)
- 114 weeks One Direction – Up All Night (2011)
- 114 weeks Katy Perry – Prism (2013)
- 114 weeks Black Eyed Peas – Elephunk (2003)
- 113 weeks Missy Higgins –The Sound of White (2004)
- 113 weeks Juice WRLD – Legends Never Die (2020)
- 113 weeks The Killers – Direct Hits (2013)
- 113 weeks Coldplay – Parachutes (2000)
- 113 weeks Keith Urban – Be Here (2004)
- 113 weeks Celine Dion – The Colour of My Love (1993)
- 112 weeks Ed Sheeran – = (2021)
- 112 weeks Sam Smith – In the Lonely Hour (2014)
- 112 weeks The Doors – The Very Best of the Doors (2007)
- 112 weeks Keith Urban – The Story So Far (2012)
- 111 weeks System of a Down – Toxicity (2001)
- 110 weeks Guns N' Roses – Use Your Illusion I (1991)
- 110 weeks Pearl Jam – Rearviewmirror (Greatest Hits 1991–2003) (2004)
- 110 weeks Paul Kelly – Songs from the South (1997)
- 110 weeks Jack Johnson – Brushfire Fairytales (2001)

=== 100 weeks or more ===
- 109 weeks Harry Styles – Harry's House (2022)
- 109 weeks Katy Perry – One of the Boys (2008)
- 109 weeks Michael Bublé – Call Me Irresponsible (2007)
- 108 weeks Cat Stevens – Remember (The Ultimate Collection) (1999)
- 108 weeks Flume – Flume (2012)
- 107 weeks Hozier – Hozier (2014)
- 107 weeks Savage Garden – Savage Garden (1997)
- 107 weeks Nickelback – Dark Horse (2008)
- 106 weeks XXXTentacion – Look at Me: The Album (2022)
- 106 weeks Ariana Grande –Thank U, Next (2019)
- 106 weeks Michael Bublé – Christmas (2011)
- 106 weeks Green Day – American Idiot (2004)
- 106 weeks Sia – This Is Acting (2016)
- 106 weeks Lady A – Need You Now (2010)
- 105 weeks Frank Ocean – Channel Orange (2012)
- 105 weeks Elton John – Goodbye Yellow Brick Road (1973)
- 105 weeks Soundtrack – Molly: Do Yourself a Favour (2016)
- 105 weeks ABBA – 18 Hits (2005)
- 105 weeks Jack Johnson – On and On (2003)
- 104 weeks Paul Kelly – Songs From The South Volumes 1 & 2 (2019)
- 104 weeks P!nk – The Truth About Love (2012)
- 104 weeks Bee Gees – Their Greatest Hits: The Record (2001)
- 104 weeks Sia – 1000 Forms of Fear (2014)
- 104 weeks Kasey Chambers – Barricades & Brickwalls (2001)
- 103 weeks Lorde – Pure Heroine (2013)
- 103 weeks Bruno Mars – XXIVK Magic (2016)
- 103 weeks Gurrumul – Gurrumul (2008)
- 103 weeks Radiohead – OK Computer (1997)
- 103 weeks Meghan Trainor – Title (2015)
- 103 weeks U2 – Rattle and Hum (1988)
- 103 weeks John Mayer – Room for Squares (2001)
- 103 weeks Fatboy Slim – You've Come a Long Way, Baby (1998)
- 102 weeks Green Day – Dookie (1994)
- 102 weeks Dire Straits – Brothers In Arms (1985)
- 102 weeks Matchbox Twenty – More Than You Think You Are (2002)
- 101 weeks The Beatles – Abbey Road (1969)
- 101 weeks Kings Of Leon – Because of the Times (2007)
- 101 weeks Tina Arena – Don't Ask (1994)
- 100 weeks Drake – Views (2016)
- 100 weeks The Black Keys – El Camino (2011)
- 100 weeks Angus & Julia Stone – Down the Way (2010)
- 100 weeks R.E.M. – In Time: The Best of R.E.M. 1988–2003 (2003)
- 100 weeks Robbie Williams – Escapology (2002)
- 100 weeks Dido – Life for Rent (2003)

(Note: Updated 19 October 2023; some pre-2023 albums may need weeks readjusted) [# at W/C: 7/5/12] - not complete (above)

== Most weeks in ARIA Top 50 Albums Chart ==
An asterisk (*) represents that an album is still in the chart

=== 300 weeks or more ===
Updated 1 September 2025

- 413 weeks Fleetwood Mac – Rumours (1977)*
- 412 weeks Eminem – Curtain Call: The Hits (2005)*
- 411 weeks Ed Sheeran – ÷ (2017)*
- 402 weeks INXS – The Very Best (2011)
- 400 weeks Taylor Swift – 1989 (2014)
- 377 weeks Luke Combs – This One's for You (2017)*
- 342 weeks Elton John – Diamonds (2017)
- 331 weeks Maroon 5 – Singles (2015)*
- 313 weeks Billie Eilish – When We All Fall Asleep, Where Do We Go? (2019)

=== 200 weeks or more ===
- 299 weeks Katy Perry – Teenage Dream: The Complete Confection (2012)*
- 297 weeks Ed Sheeran – × (2014)
- 289 weeks Taylor Swift – Lover (2019)*
- 280 weeks Queen – Bohemian Rhapsody: The Original Soundtrack (2018)
- 276 weeks Luke Combs – What You See Is What You Get (2019)
- 274 weeks Taylor Swift – Reputation (2017)*
- 266 weeks Taylor Swift – Folklore (2020)*
- 250 weeks Arctic Monkeys – AM (2013)*
- 248 weeks Ed Sheeran – + (2011)
- 238 weeks The Weeknd – The Highlights (2021)*
- 223 weeks Olivia Rodrigo – SOUR (2021)*
- 214 weeks Queen – Greatest Hits (1981)
- 214 weeks Adele – 21 (2011)
- 208 weeks Lewis Capaldi – Divinely Uninspired to a Hellish Extent (2019)
- 204 weeks Dua Lipa – Dua Lipa (2017)
- 203 weeks Harry Styles – Fine Line (2019)
- 200 weeks Dua Lipa – Future Nostalgia (2020)

=== 150 weeks or more ===
- 199 weeks Bruno Mars – Doo-Wops & Hooligans (2010)
- 195 weeks Pink – Greatest Hits... So Far!!! (2010)
- 192 weeks Cold Chisel – The Best of Cold Chisel (2011)
- 192 weeks The Weeknd – Starboy (2016)
- 191 weeks Fleetwood Mac – The Very Best of Fleetwood Mac (2002)
- 177 weeks Adele – 25 (2015)
- 177 weeks Various Artists – The Greatest Showman (2018)
- 173 weeks XXXTentacion – ? (2018)
- 167 weeks Pink – I'm Not Dead (2006)
- 165 weeks Morgan Wallen – Dangerous: The Double Album (2021)
- 161 weeks Various Artists – Guardians of the Galaxy (2014)

=== 100 weeks or more ===
- 149 weeks The Weeknd – After Hours (2020)
- 146 weeks Post Malone – Beerbongs & Bentleys (2017)
- 146 weeks Shania Twain – Come On Over (1997)
- 146 weeks Guns N' Roses – Greatest Hits (2004)
- 142 weeks Post Malone – Stoney (2016)
- 142 weeks SZA – SOS (2022)*
- 140 weeks Foo Fighters – Greatest Hits (2009)
- 140 weeks Green Day – Greatest Hits: God's Favorite Band (2017)
- 135 weeks Pop Smoke – Shoot for the Stars, Aim for the Moon (2020)
- 133 weeks ABBA – ABBA Gold - Greatest Hits (1992)
- 131 weeks Taylor Swift – Red (Taylor's Version) (2021)
- 130 weeks Morgan Wallen – One Thing at a Time (2023)*
- 123 weeks Taylor Swift – Evermore (2020)
- 123 weeks Post Malone – The Diamond Collection (2023)*
- 122 weeks The Kid Laroi – F*ck Love (2020)
- 122 weeks Travis Scott – Astroworld (2018)
- 122 weeks Kanye West – Graduation (2007)
- 121 weeks Michael Jackson – Thriller (1982)
- 121 weeks Taylor Swift – Midnights (2022)
- 119 weeks Nirvana – Nevermind (1991)
- 117 weeks Live – Throwing Copper (1994)
- 116 weeks Metallica – Metallica (1991)
- 115 weeks John Farnham – Whispering Jack (1986)
- 115 weeks Soundtrack – Grease (1978)
- 115 weeks Michael Bublé – Michael Bublé (2003)
- 114 weeks Post Malone – Hollywood's Bleeding (2019)
- 113 weeks Guns N' Roses – Appetite for Destruction (1988)
- 112 weeks Soundtrack – Frozen (2013)
- 112 weeks Foo Fighters – The Essential Foo Fighters (2022)
- 112 weeks Rihanna – Good Girl Gone Bad (2007)
- 111 weeks Billie Eilish – Don't Smile at Me (2017)
- 109 weeks Ed Sheeran – No.6 Collaborations Project (2019)
- 109 weeks Eminem – The Eminem Show (2002)
- 108 weeks Norah Jones – Come Away With Me (2002)
- 108 weeks Drake – Scorpion (2018)
- 107 weeks The Eagles – The Very Best of the Eagles (1994)
- 106 weeks Harry Styles – Harry Styles (2017)
- 105 weeks Pink Floyd – The Dark Side Of The Moon (1973)
- 104 weeks Khalid – American Teen (2017)
- 104 weeks Pink – Funhouse (2008)
- 103 weeks Red Hot Chili Peppers – Greatest Hits (2003)
- 103 weeks Powderfinger – Internationalist (1998)
- 102 weeks Bon Jovi – Greatest Hits (2010)
- 102 weeks Sam Smith – In the Lonely Hour (2014)
- 102 weeks Billie Eilish – Happier Than Ever (2021)
- 101 weeks Olivia Rodrigo – Guts (2023)
- 100 weeks Vance Joy – Dream Your Life Away (2014)
- 100 weeks Michael Buble – Christmas (2011)

== Artists with the most number-one albums ==
- Jimmy Barnes (Australia) (16)
- The Beatles (United Kingdom) (14)
- Taylor Swift (United States) (14)
- Madonna (United States) (12)
- U2 (Ireland) (12)
- Eminem (United States) (11)
- Bon Jovi (United States) (10)
- John Farnham (Australia) (10)
- Kylie Minogue (Australia) (9)
- Foo Fighters (United States) (8)
- The Rolling Stones (United Kingdom) (8)
- Coldplay (United Kingdom) (8)

== Artists with multiple albums in Top 100/Top 50 ==
=== Top 100 ===
- David Bowie (17) – January 2016
- Michael Jackson (14) – July 2009
- Bon Jovi (8) – January 2008

=== Top 50 ===
- Taylor Swift (10) – two consecutive weeks from 6 November 2023 to 13 November 2023 (Note: 6 November 2023, 13 November 2023) and then in April 2024

== Artists at number one on singles and albums chart at the same time ==
- Macy Gray – "I Try" and On How Life Is (10 January 2000 – 17 January 2000)
- Eminem – "Stan" and The Marshall Mathers LP (5 March 2001)
- Eminem – "Without Me" and The Eminem Show (3 June 2002, 17 June 2002)
- Eminem – "Lose Yourself" and 8 Mile (27 January 2003 – 3 February 2003)
- Delta Goodrem – "Innocent Eyes" and Innocent Eyes (30 June 2003 – 7 July 2003)
- Delta Goodrem – "Not Me, Not I" and Innocent Eyes (29 September 2003)
- Guy Sebastian – "Angels Brought Me Here" and Just As I Am (15 December 2003)
- Shannon Noll – "What About Me" and That's What I'm Talking About (16 February 2004 – 23 February 2004)
- D12 – "My Band" and D12 World (3 May 2004)
- Damien Leith – "Night of My Life" and The Winner's Journey (18 December 2006 – 25 December 2006)
- Hinder – "Lips of an Angel" and Extreme Behaviour (26 February 2007)
- Fergie – "Big Girls Don't Cry" and The Dutchess (30 July 2007 – 20 August 2007)
- Timbaland – "Apologize" and Shock Value (31 December 2007 – 14 January 2008)
- Madonna – "4 Minutes" and Hard Candy (5 May 2008)
- Kings of Leon – "Sex on Fire" and Only by the Night (20 October 2008)
- The Black Eyed Peas – "Boom Boom Pow" and The E.N.D. (15 June 2009)
- Eminem – "Love the Way You Lie" and Recovery (19 July 2010 – 2 August 2010, 16 August 2010 - 23 August 2010)
- Adele – "Someone like You" and 21 (27 June 2011 – 8 August 2011)
- Gotye – "Somebody That I Used to Know" and Making Mirrors (29 August 2011)
- Eminem – "The Monster" and The Marshall Mathers LP 2 (18 November 2013)
- Pharrell Williams – "Happy" and Girl (17 March 2014)
- Taylor Swift – "Blank Space" and 1989 (1 December 2014)
- Adele – "Hello" and 25 (30 November 2015 – 7 December 2015)
- Lukas Graham – "7 Years" and Lukas Graham (11 April 2016)
- Drake – "One Dance" and Views (9 May 2016)
- Ed Sheeran – "Shape of You" and ÷ (13 March 2017 → 10 April 2017, 24 April 2017 – 1 May 2017)
- Ed Sheeran – "Perfect" and ÷ (18 December 2017, 1 January 2018)
- Post Malone – "Psycho" and Beerbongs & Bentleys (7 May 2018)
- 5 Seconds of Summer – "Youngblood" and Youngblood (25 June 2018)
- Lady Gaga and Bradley Cooper – "Shallow" and A Star Is Born (29 October 2018 – 12 November 2018)
- Ariana Grande – "7 Rings" and Thank U, Next (18 February 2019)
- Billie Eilish – "Bad Guy" and When We All Fall Asleep, Where Do We Go? (8 April 2019 – 15 April 2019)
- The Weeknd – "Blinding Lights" and After Hours (23 March 2020 – 30 March 2020)
- Taylor Swift – "Cardigan" and Folklore (27 July 2020 – 3 August 2020)
- Taylor Swift – "Willow" and Evermore (14 December 2020 – 21 December 2020)
- Justin Bieber – "Peaches" and Justice (5 April 2021 – 12 April 2021)
- Olivia Rodrigo – "Good 4 U" and Sour (31 May 2021 – 28 June 2021)
- Taylor Swift – "All Too Well (Taylor's Version)" and Red (Taylor's Version) (22 November 2021)
- Adele – "Easy on Me" and 30 (29 November 2021 – 6 December 2021)
- Taylor Swift – "Anti-Hero" and Midnights (28 October 2022 – 28 November 2022)
- Taylor Swift – "Is It Over Now?" and 1989 (Taylor's Version) (6 November 2023 – 13 November 2023)
- Taylor Swift – "Cruel Summer" and Midnights (26 February 2024 – 4 March 2024)
- Taylor Swift – "Fortnight" and The Tortured Poets Department (26 April 2024 – 3 May 2024)
- Sabrina Carpenter – "Taste" and Short n' Sweet (2 September 2024 – 9 September 2024, 23 September 2024 – 21 October 2024)

== Simultaneously occupying the top three or more positions ==
=== Albums ===
For the first time in ARIA chart history, Michael Jackson occupied the first three spots of the Albums Chart, following his death in June 2009.

1. The Essential Michael Jackson
2. Number Ones
3. Thriller

For the first time in ARIA chart history, Taylor Swift occupied the first five spots of the Albums Chart dated 10 July 2023, after tickets for the Australian leg of The Eras Tour went on-sale.

1. Midnights
2. Lover
3. 1989
4. Reputation
5. Folklore

Swift repeated the feat on the chart dated 12 February 2024, with 1989 (Taylor's Version) topping the chart, followed by Midnights, Lover, Reputation and Folklore. She repeated the feat again on the chart dated 26 February 2024, when the Australian leg of The Eras Tour began, with Midnights on No. 1, followed by 1989 (Taylor's Version), Lover, Folklore and Reputation.

On the chart dated 4 March 2024, Swift became the first artist ever to simultaneously occupy the entire top 6 of the albums chart, as the Australian leg of her tour concludes.

1. Midnights
2. Lover
3. 1989 (Taylor's Version)
4. Folklore
5. Reputation
6. Evermore

=== Singles ===
After winning season one of The Voice, Karise Eden simultaneously occupied the top three positions of the singles chart, the first time this has occurred in Australian chart history since The Beatles held the top six spots in 1964. (Note: Eden's songs made some of the biggest falls in Australian chart history in the following weeks. "Stay With Me Baby" fell to #54 the next week, the biggest drop for a #1 single in chart history, and left the top 100 the following week. It is currently the shortest time a #1 song has spent in both the Top 50 and the Top 100. "Hallelujah" dropped from #2 to #38 and then out of the Top 100 the next week. "I Was Your Girl" spent only one week in the Top 100, a drop of 97+ places, the equal biggest fall out of the Top 100 in Australian chart history.)

1. "Stay With Me Baby"
2. "Hallelujah"
3. "I Was Your Girl"

On 27 February 2017, Ed Sheeran occupied the top three positions. However next week, "How Would You Feel" fell out of the top ten and was replaced by The Chainsmokers and Coldplay's "Something Just like This".

1. "Shape of You"
2. "How Would You Feel (Paean)"
3. "Castle on the Hill"

On 28 October 2022, Taylor Swift occupied the top six positions and nine overall in the top 10, with songs from her tenth studio album, Midnights.

1. "Anti-Hero"
2. "Lavender Haze"
3. "Snow on the Beach" (feat. Lana Del Rey)
4. "Maroon"
5. "Midnight Rain"
6. "You're on Your Own, Kid"

On 26 April 2024 Taylor Swift became the first artist to occupy the entire top ten of the singles chart with songs from her eleventh studio album, The Tortured Poets Department.

1. "Fortnight"
2. "Down Bad"
3. "The Tortured Poets Department"
4. "So Long, London"
5. "I Can Do It with a Broken Heart"
6. "My Boy Only Breaks His Favorite Toys"
7. "But Daddy I Love Him"
8. "Florida!!!"
9. "Who's Afraid of Little Old Me?"
10. "Guilty as Sin?"

On 2 September 2024, Sabrina Carpenter occupied the top three positions.

1. "Taste"
2. "Please Please Please"
3. "Espresso"

On 10 October 2025 Taylor Swift held the entire top ten again with songs from her twelfth studio album The Life of a Showgirl.

1. "The Fate of Ophelia"
2. "Opalite"
3. "Elizabeth Taylor"
4. "Father Figure"
5. "Wood"
6. "The Life of a Showgirl"
7. "Cancelled!"
8. "Actually Romantic"
9. "Wish List"
10. "Eldest Daughter"

On 2 March 2026, Olivia Dean occupied the top three positions.

1. "Man I Need"
2. "Rein Me In" (with Sam Fender)
3. "So Easy (To Fall in Love)"

== Other achievements ==
- The first artist to have singles debut at the top two simultaneously was Ed Sheeran on 16 January 2017 with "Shape of You" at number one and "Castle on the Hill" at number two.
- Ed Sheeran had 3 albums, ÷, x, and +, simultaneously in the top 50 for 36 consecutive weeks, from the debut of ÷ on 19 March 2017 to the departure of + on 19 November 2017. Together, these albums spent a total of 810 weeks in the top 50.
- All 16 tracks from Taylor Swift's album Folklore debuted on the singles chart, breaking the all-time record for the most simultaneous debuts in one week.
- On 28 October 2022, Taylor Swift simultaneously occupied 9 out of the 10 spots in the top ten of the singles chart, becoming the artist to occupy the most spots in the top ten at a time. She also became the artist with the most top-ten singles earned in a year.
- Taylor Swift's "Anti-Hero" became the first song in the chart's history to debut at number one on the airplay chart. Swift was also atop the singles and albums chart, making her the first artist to simultaneously hold three number ones in ARIA chart history.
- On 17 July 2023, Taylor Swift became the first artist to replace themselves at No. 1 on the albums chart, when Speak Now (Taylor's Version) replaced Midnights.
- On 26 April 2024 Taylor Swift became the first artist to occupy the entire top ten of the singles chart with songs from her eleventh studio album, The Tortured Poets Department. Additionally, Swift charted 29 songs in the top 50 of the singles chart, the most by any artist.
