= Down Bad =

Down Bad may refer to:

- "Down Bad" (Dreamville Records song)
- "Down Bad" (Taylor Swift song)
