= My Boy Only Breaks His Favorite Toys =

2024 song by Taylor Swift

Song by Taylor Swift

from the album The Tortured Poets Department
- Released: April 19, 2024
- Studio: Conway Recording, Los Angeles; Electric Lady, New York
- Genre: Synth-pop
- Length: 3:23
- Label: Republic
- Songwriter: Taylor Swift
- Producers: Taylor Swift; Jack Antonoff

Lyric video
- "My Boy Only Breaks His Favorite Toys" on YouTube

"My Boy Only Breaks His Favorite Toys" is a song written and recorded by the American singer-songwriter Taylor Swift for her eleventh studio album, The Tortured Poets Department (2024). Produced by Swift and Jack Antonoff, it is a synth-pop song featuring marching drums and elements of new wave. The lyrics describe romantic abandonment by an avoidant partner through the metaphor of a broken toy.

Some critics praised the song's melodic catchiness, while some others were critical of the lyrical imagery as redundant or uninventive. "My Boy Only Breaks His Favorite Toys" peaked at number six on the Billboard Global 200 and reached the top 10 on charts of Australia, Canada, Ireland, New Zealand, the Philippines, Singapore, and the United States. Swift performed the song live twice on the Eras Tour in 2024.

== Background and release ==
Swift developed her eleventh studio album, The Tortured Poets Department, "for about two years" after finishing her previous album, Midnights (2022). She reflected on The Tortured Poets Department as a "lifeline" for her, and its conception took place amidst media reports on Swift's personal life and her relationships with Joe Alwyn, Matty Healy, and Travis Kelce. The album was released on April 19, 2024, via Republic Records.

"My Boy Only Breaks His Favorite Toys" is track number three on the standard edition; it is one of the two tracks solely written by Swift, the other being "Who's Afraid of Little Old Me?". Swift performed the song live on piano, as a "surprise song" outside the regular set list, at the second Paris show of her concert tour, the Eras Tour, on May 10, 2024. This performance was recorded and included in a limited-time digital variant of The Tortured Poets Department. She performed the song again on piano, this time as part of a mashup with her 2020 track "Coney Island", at the August 17, 2024, show of the Eras Tour in London.

A "First Draft Memo" version of "My Boy Only Breaks His Favorite Toys", a demo recorded by Swift on piano, was released as a bonus track for another limited-time digital variant of the album on August 3, 2024. This version contains several lyrics that were trimmed from the album cut.

== Music and lyrics ==
"My Boy Only Breaks His Favorite Toys"
A mid-tempo synth-pop song, "My Boy Only Breaks His Favorite Toys" is characterized by marching drums and pulsing synths.

Swift produced "My Boy Only Breaks His Favorite Toys" with Jack Antonoff, who programmed the track and played instruments including bass, drums, electric guitar, and synths; Swift herself played the piano on the song. The track was recorded by Laura Sisk and Oli Jacobs, assisted by Jack Manning and Jon Sher, at Conway Recording Studios in Los Angeles and Electric Lady Studios in New York. Mixing was conducted by Serban Ghenea and engineered by Bryce Bordone at MixStar Studios in Virginia Beach, and mastering was handled by Randy Merrill.

At 3 minutes and 23 seconds long, "My Boy Only Breaks His Favorite Toys" is a synth-pop song, whose mid-tempo production begins with gated snare drums and proceeds with sixteenth-note sequences of synth bass generated with a Moog bass, persistent synths generated with a Korg M1 and a Juno, and pounding, marching drums. Maria Sherman of the Associated Press described the production as "new wave-adjacent", while Igor Bannikov of PopMatters compared the marching drums to the styles of My Chemical Romance. Finn McRemond of The Irish Times likened the bass-heavy production of "My Boy Only Breaks His Favorite Toys" to the production styles of Swift's 2017 album Reputation.

Swift told Amazon Music that "My Boy Only Breaks His Favorite Toys" was about "being somebody's favorite toy until they break you and then don't want to play with you anymore". She elaborated that the song was about being in denial: "[...] you could live in this world where there's still hope for a toxic, broken relationship." The lyrics describe Swift's narrator from the stance of a toy being abandoned by her deleterious partner, who avoids rather than addresses his problems. The song uses lyrical imagery related to toys, such as melted plastic dolls and destroyed sandcastles on a school playground. The narrator wishes to revisit a failed romance before its breakup: she addresses how her partner gradually lost his interest in her in the pre-chorus ("But you should've seen him when he first got me") and how the couple gave each other another attempt ("There was a litany of reasons why we could've playеd for keeps this time, I know I'm just repeating mysеlf, put me back on my shelf").

The chorus depicts the relationship as unhealthy ("My boy only breaks his favorite toys, toys, oh, I'm queen of sandcastles he destroys") and the love interest as uncaring and destructive ("He saw 'forever' so he smashed it up"). The lyrics, "I felt more when we played pretend, than with all the Kens/ 'Cause he took me out of my box, stole my tortured heart", allude to the lover being a rebound after a recent breakup and reference the male doll Ken in Barbie, inspired by the 2023 popular culture phenomenon Barbenheimer.

== Critical reception ==
Several critics praised the production of "My Boy Only Breaks His Favorite Toys". In Billboard, Jason Lipshutz ranked it 17th out of all 31 songs on the double album The Tortured Poets Department: The Anthology, saying that the song "deserves the stadium treatment" and describing it as a "big, booming song". The Hollywood Reporter's Ryan Fish described the song as a "poppy earworm". Several critics picked "My Boy Only Breaks His Favorite Toys" as a sonic highlight on the album, including Bannikov, No Ripcord's David Coleman, and Beats Per Minute's John Wohlmacher, who further complimented how Swift explores her vocal range on the song. Slant Magazine's Jonathan Keefe and The Daily Telegraph's Neil McCormick thought that the track has a potential to become a radio hit with its catchy hooks.

Vulture's Nate Jones wrote that the song was "sadder than you'd think". Cosmopolitan's Courtney Young ranked it twenty-sixth in her ranking of the top thirty breakup songs by Swift. In her initial review, Business Insider's Callie Ahlgrim said the track was sonically reminiscent of the vault tracks from Swift's 2023 re-recorded album 1989 (Taylor's Version), "so this isn't necessarily a knock in my book". She added that the song failed to stand out because it relied on a "fast-dulling formula". In her post-review article published a week after her initial review, Ahlgrim recategorized the song from "background music" to "worth listening to". Alexis Petridis of The Guardian and Annie Zaleski thought that the lyrics are deftly written. Will Hodgkinson from The Times agreed, but he added that the "standard-issue moody synth-pop backing doesn't match the intrigue of the lyrics".

In negative reviews, an anonymous Paste journalist opined that the song "features another low-point in Swift's lyrical oeuvre" and added that Swift was "capitalizing on the Barbenheimer mania that none of us could escape", while Alex Hudson from Exclaim! said the song was "yet another mid-tempo synthpop plodder". Olivia Horn of Pitchfork contended that the lyrical metaphors are ineffective, "[working] a schoolyard premise until it cracks".

== Commercial performance ==
Upon the release of The Tortured Poets Department, nine of its tracks debuted in the top 10 of the Billboard Global 200. "My Boy Only Breaks His Favorite Toys" debuted and peaked at number six. In the United States, it debuted at number six on the Billboard Hot 100. Together with other album tracks from The Tortured Poets Department, it helped Swift become the first artist to monopolize the top 14 the same week. In Australia, the track peaked at number six on the ARIA Singles Chart and was certified platinum by the Australian Recording Industry Association. The song also received a gold certification by the British Phonographic Industry in the United Kingdom, where it reached number 10 on the UK Streaming Chart and number 88 on the UK Download Chart.

Elsewhere, "My Boy Only Breaks His Favorite Toys" peaked within the top 10 of charts in Canada (six), New Zealand (seven), the Philippines (nine), and Singapore (seven). The track also reached the top 25 in Denmark (17), Portugal (15), Sweden (13), Malaysia (11), and the United Arab Emirates (14); and on Billboard's Hits of the World charts for Belgium (17), Luxembourg (12), and Ireland (10).

== Personnel ==
Credits adapted from the liner notes of The Tortured Poets Department

- Taylor Swift – lead vocals, piano, songwriter, producer
- Jack Antonoff – producer, programming, drums, electric guitar, bass, Moog, Juno, M1
- Laura Sisk – recording
- Oli Jacobs – recording
- Jon Sher – assistant engineering
- Jack Manning – assistant engineering
- Serban Ghenea – mixing
- Bryce Bordone – mix engineering
- Randy Merrill – mastering
- Ryan Smith – vinyl mastering

== Charts ==
Chart performance
Chart (2024)	Peak position
Argentina Hot 100 (Billboard)	80
Australia (ARIA)	6
Brazil Hot 100 (Billboard)	50
Canada Hot 100 (Billboard)	6
Denmark (Tracklisten)	17
Finland (Suomen virallinen lista)	49
France (SNEP)	49
Global 200 (Billboard)	6
Greece International (IFPI)	11
India International (IMI)	14
Luxembourg (Billboard)	12
Malaysia International (RIM)	11
New Zealand (Recorded Music NZ)	7
Norway (VG-lista)	29
Philippines (Billboard)	9
Portugal (AFP)	15
Singapore (RIAS)	7
Slovakia (Singles Digitál Top 100)	39
South Africa (Billboard)	17
Spain (Promusicae)	43
Sweden (Sverigetopplistan)	13
Swiss Streaming (Schweizer Hitparade)	18
UAE (IFPI)	14
UK Singles Downloads (Official Charts)	88
UK Streaming (OCC)	10
US Billboard Hot 100	6
US Adult Pop Airplay (Billboard)	36
US Pop Airplay (Billboard)	40

== Certifications ==
Certifications for "My Boy Only Breaks His Favorite Toys"
Region	Certification	Certified units/sales
Australia (ARIA)	Platinum	70,000^{‡}
Brazil (Pro-Música Brasil)	2× Platinum	80,000^{‡}
New Zealand (RMNZ)	Gold	15,000^{‡}
United Kingdom (BPI)	Gold	400,000^{‡}
^{‡} Sales+streaming figures based on certification alone.
