= Psycho Teddy =

2007 single by Psycho Teddy

"Psycho Teddy (Do You Really Really Want To?)"

Single by Psycho Teddy
- Released: 18 December 2007
- Recorded: 2007
- Genre: Dance pop
- Length: 3:05
- Label: Sony BMG
- Songwriters: Michael Migusha and Dion Howell

"Psycho Teddy (Do You Really Really Want To?)", also referred to as "Psycho Teddy (Call to Psycho Teddy)" is a 2007 dance pop song by the fictional character Psycho Teddy, composed by Michael Migusha and Dion Howell. It serves as both a ringtone and a single and was released in Australia on 18 December 2007. Another song, a rendition of the Bee Gees' "You Should Be Dancing", was also released by Psycho Teddy. (Albeit under the alias "DJ Teddy Z" after StigmaWatch privately contacted SonyBMG for the record company's use of the word "psycho")

== Music video ==
The music video starts and ends with the effect of an old television switching on and off. It features various digital graphics, and computer-generated imagery of the titular Psycho Teddy in two forms - a "cute" form and a "psycho" form. In his "cute" form, he wears heart-shaped glasses, and is depicted hugging himself and jumping around joyfully. In his "psycho" form, he is depicted spinning around, making faces and jumping about. Psycho Teddy switches between these two forms throughout the video.

== Charts ==
Chart (2008)	Peak position
Australia (ARIA)	5
