= Down Bad (Taylor Swift song) =

2024 song by Taylor Swift

Song by Taylor Swift

from the album The Tortured Poets Department
- Released: April 19, 2024
- Studio: Conway Recording (Los Angeles); Electric Lady (New York)
- Genre: Synth-pop
- Length: 4:21
- Label: Republic
- Songwriters: Taylor Swift; Jack Antonoff
- Producers: Taylor Swift; Jack Antonoff

Lyric video
- "Down Bad" on YouTube

"Down Bad" is a song by the American singer-songwriter Taylor Swift from her eleventh studio album, The Tortured Poets Department (2024). She wrote and produced the track with Jack Antonoff, who played the song's instruments with members of his band Bleachers. "Down Bad" is about a momentary infatuation: the narrator compares falling in love with being abducted by an extraterrestrial being and is then suddenly deserted by her love interest. Musically, "Down Bad" is a synth-pop song with R&B elements in its groove and vocal cadence.

In publications' reviews, some critics favorably deemed "Down Bad" a catchy song with simple lyrics. The track charted within the top 10 in Australia, Canada, Luxembourg, Malaysia, New Zealand, the Philippines, Singapore, the United Kingdom, and the United States. It was certified double platinum in Australia, and gold in New Zealand and the United Kingdom. Swift included the song in the revamped set list of the Eras Tour starting from May 2024.

== Background and release ==
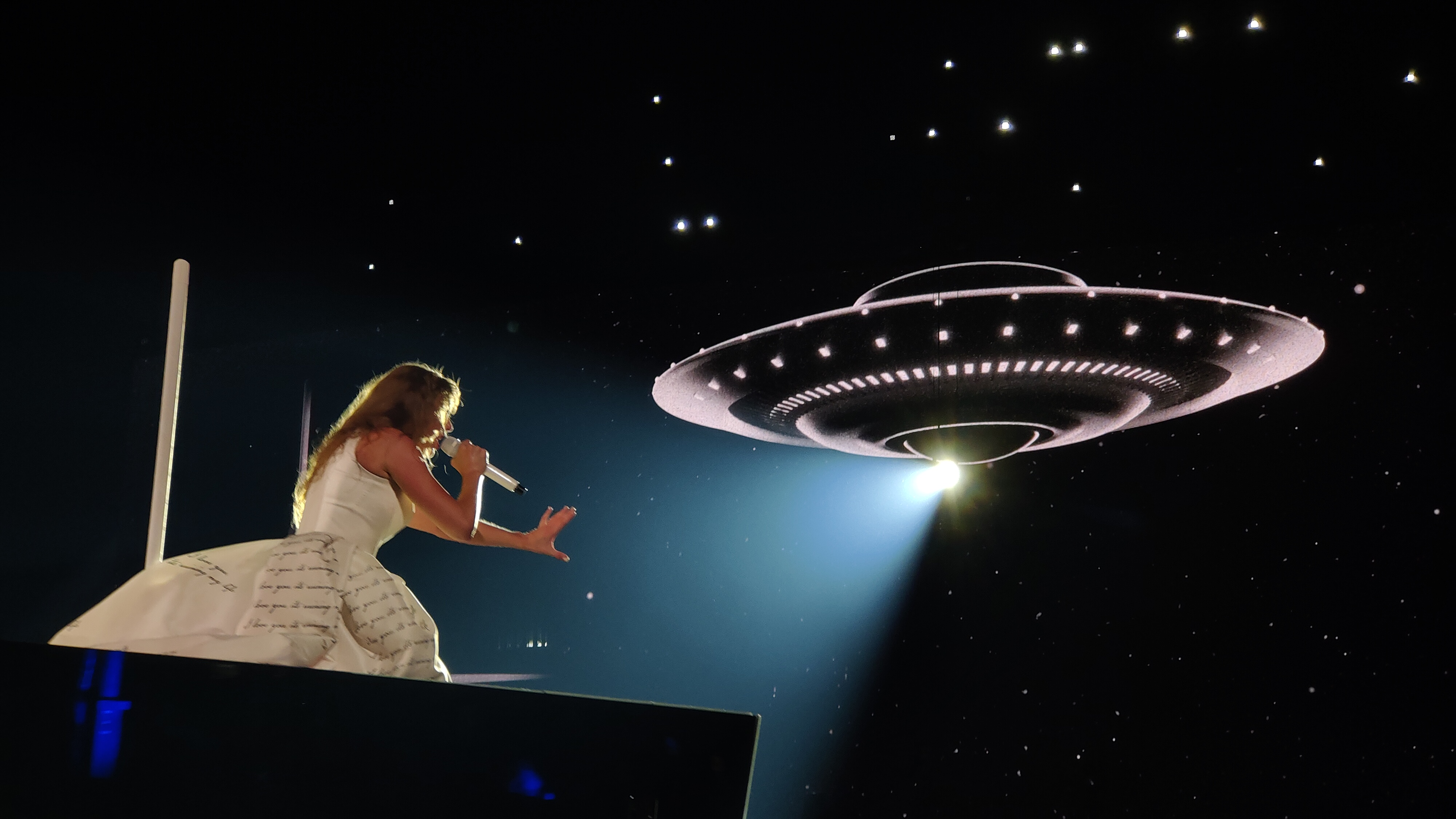
Swift performing "Down Bad" at the Eras Tour in 2024

Swift started working on The Tortured Poets Department immediately after she submitted her tenth studio album, Midnights, to Republic Records for release in 2022. She continued working on it in secrecy throughout the US leg of the Eras Tour in 2023. The album's conception took place when Swift's personal life continued to be a widely covered topic in the press. She described The Tortured Poets Department as her "lifeline" album which she "really needed" to make. Republic Records released it on April 19, 2024; "Down Bad" is fourth on the track list.

Starting from the May 2024 shows in Paris, Swift included "Down Bad" in the set list of the Eras Tour. She performed the song while sitting on a rotating metal block that moved around the stage as an image of an UFO appeared above her.

== Music and lyrics ==
"Down Bad"
"Down Bad" is a synth-pop song with a percolating synth bassline. It features R&B influences demonstrated through its cadences and dynamic shifts.

"Down Bad" is about a momentary infatuation. In a track-by-track commentary for Amazon Music, Swift said that she wrote the song comparing "the idea of being love bombed, where someone rocks your world and dazzles you and then just kind of abandons you as an alien abduction where you were abducted by aliens". In the lyrics, Swift's character encounters a fleeting sensation that she describes as "cosmic love" and deeming her love interest "my twin", longing to be abducted by aliens. Mary Siroky of Consequence found the lyrics to contain an "air of death": "Fuck it, if I can't have him/ I might just die/ It would make no difference."

Musically, "Down Bad" is a synth-pop song with R&B inflections, showcased via its dynamic shifts and cadences. Swift sings using syllabic syncopation over a subdued electronic production with a synth bassline. Chris Willman of Variety compared the production of "Down Bad" to Swift's 2022 album Midnights, pointing out the "sinuous groove, topped by a kind of distorted-electronic voice effect as its own instrumental track". Mark Savage of the BBC also compared the track to Midnights, highlighting the "delicately percolating" production with "pillowy synths and muted drums". The song is written in the key of B major in common time with a tempo of 80 beats per minute. The song follows a chord progression of B – F♯ – B/D♯ – E, and Swift's vocals span from E_{3} to C♯_{5}. It is notable for containing the most usages of swearing in any song by Swift, due to the repeated use of the word "fuck" in its chorus.

== Critical reception ==
Jason Lipshutz of Billboard ranked "Down Bad" as the sixth-best song out of 31 tracks on The Tortured Poets Department, describing the song as "one of the album's purest pop pleasures". Pitchfork's Olivia Horn thought that the song worked "because of the juxtaposition between its banal hook and its description of 'cosmic love'". Finn McRedmond from The Irish Times highlighted the song's blunt lyrics, drawing comparisons to some of her previous work from both 1989 and Folklore. Bobby Olivier of NJ.com picked the track as the album's catchiest.

In The New Yorker, Amanda Petrusich appreciated the simple lyricism of "Down Bad" and summed it up as "a woozy song about feeling like shit". Willman ranked "Down Bad" 16th on his April 2024 updated list of the best 75 songs by Swift, saying that while it is not one of the most poetic tracks from the album, it has "one of the best grooves, perfect for any workout queen's most depressed cooldown". SLUG Magazine's Palak Jayswal dubbed "Down Bad" an "anthem that Swifties always crave", adding that it captures the essence of love bombing and falling for another person. Josh Kurp from Uproxx felt that the track was a representation of the album's verbose and genre-less quality but opined that it was "extremely personal [...] to the point of discomfort".

In less enthusiastic reviews, John Wohlmacher of Beats Per Minute criticized Swift's excessive use of "metaphor-chains" in her lyricism which dilutes the emotional sentiment she wants to communicate, and Laura Molloy of NME said that the track contains some "cringe-inducing lines". Maria Sherman of the Associated Press described the song as "mawkish" that blemished the album's otherwise "meditative" mood.

== Commercial performance ==
When the album was released, nine of its tracks occupied the top 10 of the Billboard Global 200; "Down Bad" opened and peaked at number two on the chart, behind Swift's own "Fortnight". It extended her top-10 entries to 33 on the chart. In the United States, the track debuted at its peak of number two on the Billboard Hot 100, behind "Fortnight". The song alongside 13 tracks from the album made Swift the first artist to monopolize the top 14 of the Hot 100. In Australia, "Down Bad" reached number two on the ARIA Singles Chart and made her the artist with the most entries in a single week with 29. In the United Kingdom, it reached number four on the UK singles chart and extended her top 10 chart entries to 28.

Elsewhere, "Down Bad" charted within the top 10 in Canada (2), New Zealand (3), the Philippines (3), Singapore (3), Malaysia (8), and Luxembourg (9). The song also reached the top 20 in several territories: number 11 in Hong Kong, Ireland, and Portugal, number 13 in Latvia, number 14 in South Africa, number 16 in Denmark, number 17 in Indonesia, number 18 in Belgium, and number 19 in Sweden. It received a double-platinum certification from the Australian Recording Industry Association (ARIA).

== Personnel ==
Credits are adapted from the liner notes of The Tortured Poets Department.

- Taylor Swift – lead vocals, songwriter, producer
- Jack Antonoff – producer, songwriter, Juno, M1, Mellotron, piano, drums, percussion, programming, backing vocals
- Mikey Freedom Hart – Mellotron, DX7, M1
- Sean Hutchinson – percussion
- Evan Smith – saxophone
- Zem Audu – saxophone
- Laura Sisk – engineering, recording
- Oli Jacobs – engineering, recording
- Jack Manning – engineering assistance, recording
- Jon Sher – engineering assistance
- Michael Riddleberger – recording
- Serban Ghenea – mixing
- Bryce Bordone – mix engineering
- Randy Merrill – mastering
- Ryan Smith – vinyl mastering

== Charts ==
=== Weekly charts ===
Weekly chart performance
| Chart (2024) | Peak position |
|---|---|
| Argentina Hot 100 (Billboard) | 56 |
| Australia (ARIA) | 2 |
| Austria (Ö3 Austria Top 40) | 39 |
| Brazil Hot 100 (Billboard) | 45 |
| Canada Hot 100 (Billboard) | 2 |
| Croatia (Billboard) | 22 |
| Czech Republic Singles Digital (ČNS IFPI) | 27 |
| Denmark (Tracklisten) | 16 |
| Finland (Suomen virallinen lista) | 46 |
| France (SNEP) | 53 |
| Global 200 (Billboard) | 2 |
| Greece International (IFPI) | 12 |
| Hong Kong (Billboard) | 11 |
| India International (IMI) | 4 |
| Indonesia (Billboard) | 17 |
| Ireland (IRMA) | 11 |
| Italy (FIMI) | 79 |
| Latvia (LAIPA) | 13 |
| Luxembourg (Billboard) | 9 |
| Malaysia (Billboard) | 8 |
| MENA (IFPI) | 6 |
| Netherlands (Single Top 100) | 88 |
| New Zealand (Recorded Music NZ) | 3 |
| Norway (VG-lista) | 26 |
| Philippines (Billboard) | 3 |
| Poland (Polish Streaming Top 100) | 75 |
| Portugal (AFP) | 11 |
| Singapore (RIAS) | 3 |
| Slovakia Singles Digital (ČNS IFPI) | 31 |
| South Africa (TOSAC) | 14 |
| South Korea Download (Circle) | 152 |
| Sweden (Sverigetopplistan) | 19 |
| Switzerland (Schweizer Hitparade) | 43 |
| UAE (IFPI) | 4 |
| UK Singles (Official Charts) | 4 |
| US Billboard Hot 100 | 2 |

=== Year-end charts ===
2024 year-end chart performance
| Chart (2024) | Position |
|---|---|
| Canada (Canadian Hot 100) | 78 |
| Global 200 (Billboard) | 155 |
| US Billboard Hot 100 | 99 |

== Certifications ==
Certifications for "Down Bad"
| Region | Certification | Certified units/sales |
|---|---|---|
| Australia (ARIA) | 2× Platinum | 140,000^{‡} |
| Brazil (Pro-Música Brasil) | 3× Platinum | 120,000^{‡} |
| New Zealand (RMNZ) | Platinum | 30,000^{‡} |
| United Kingdom (BPI) | Gold | 400,000^{‡} |
^{‡} Sales+streaming figures based on certification alone.
