= Who's Afraid of Little Old Me? =

2024 song by Taylor Swift

Song by Taylor Swift

from the album The Tortured Poets Department
- Released: April 19, 2024
- Studio: Conway Recording (Los Angeles); Electric Lady (New York); Esplanade (New Orleans)
- Genre: Chamber pop
- Length: 5:34
- Label: Republic
- Songwriter: Taylor Swift
- Producers: Taylor Swift; Jack Antonoff

Lyric video
- "Who's Afraid of Little Old Me?" on YouTube

"Who's Afraid of Little Old Me?" is a song written and recorded by the American singer-songwriter Taylor Swift for her eleventh studio album, The Tortured Poets Department (2024). Produced by Swift and Jack Antonoff, the track is a Southern Gothic-inspired chamber pop song that incorporates dense echo and strings. The lyrics were inspired by Swift's bitter feelings while reflecting on her teenage rise to stardom: they compare a narrator to a wicked witch and a trapped circus animal, detailing how her upbringing in an asylum contributes to her callous and vicious nature.

Some music critics found the tone of "Who's Afraid of Little Old Me?" heavy and the lyrics confusing, while others praised the musical elements and complimented the lyrics as biting and impactful. The song peaked at number nine on the Billboard Global 200 and charted in the top 10 in Australia, Canada, New Zealand, and the United States. It received certifications in Australia, Brazil, New Zealand, and the United Kingdom. Swift performed the track on the 2024 shows of the Eras Tour.

== Background and release ==
Swift started working on The Tortured Poets Department immediately after she submitted her tenth studio album, Midnights, to Republic Records for release in 2022. She continued working on it in secrecy throughout the US leg of the Eras Tour in 2023. The album's conception took place when Swift's personal life continued to be a widely covered topic in the press. She described The Tortured Poets Department as her "lifeline" album which she "really needed" to make. Republic Records released it on April 19, 2024; "Who's Afraid of Little Old Me?" is tenth on the track list.

== Lyrics and music ==
Swift produced "Who's Afraid of Little Old Me?" with Jack Antonoff, who programmed it and played instruments including synths (Juno, Moog, M1, Mellotron), drums, bass, electric guitar, piano, and cello. The track was recorded by Jonathan Low, Jack Manning, Joey Miller, and Laura Sisk at Conway Recording Studios in Los Angeles, Electric Lady Studios in New York, and Esplanade Studios in New Orleans. Other musicians on the track include Sean Hutchinson (drums), Aaron Dessner (piano), Zem Audu (synths), Mikey Freedom Hart (synths), Evan Smith (synths), and Michael Riddleberger (percussion). At 5 minutes and 34 seconds long, "Who's Afraid of Little Old Me?" is a chamber pop song with elements of orchestral pop, instrumented with dense layers of echo and strings, accents of twangy electric guitars, and galloping synths with swirling arpeggiators. The bridge incorporates a resonating Moog bass.

The lyrics, incorporating Southern Gothic melodrama elements, detail Swift's perception of her public image. The song starts with Swift confronting her critics ("If you wanted me dead, you should've just said/ Nothing makes me feel more alive") and, in the chorus, imagines herself as a witch that unleashes her anger onto a town ("So I leap from the gallows and I levitate down your street/ Crash the party like a record scratch as I scream/ 'Who's afraid of little old me?'/ You should be"). In the next verse, Swift recounts having been raised in an "asylum" and expresses how she becomes cold-hearted in the face of speculation on her personal life ("I was tame, I was gentle/ Til the circus life made me mean"). She details how she had to conform herself to a culture in which she was brought up: "You taught me, you caged me, and then you called me crazy."

In a commentary for Amazon Music, Swift recalled that she wrote "Who's Afraid of Little Old Me?" alone on piano, while being in a bitter state reflecting on how her teenage rise to stardom influenced her self-perception. She said that "the world has this sense of ownership" over public figures, leading them to be easily critiqued for their behaviors; "We put them through hell. We watch what they create, then we judge it. We love to watch artists in pain, often to the point where I think sometimes as a society we provoke that pain, and we just watch what happens."

Several critics compared the theme of "Who's Afraid of Little Old Me?" to that of "Anti-Hero" (2022), a track about Swift's self-critique and self-loathing. Rob Sheffield of Rolling Stone described "Who's Afraid of Little Old Me?" as a "luridly comic goth-horror melodrama of girlhood in America" and labelled it an "evil twin" of "Mirrorball" (2020) while also being "filtered through" Mary Shelley's 1818 novel Frankenstein. Vulture's Craig Jenkins thought that the lyrics portrayed a "thirst for supernatural revenge" that recalls "witch trials and Carrie". Vogue Australia thought that the title is a reference to Who's Afraid of Virginia Woolf?, a 1962 play by Edward Albee about a derailed marriage.

== Critical reception ==
"Who's Afraid of Little Old Me?" received mixed reviews, with several critics remarking that the song had a heavy tone that made it hard to listen to. Mark Savage of the BBC thought that the theme was "salty and mischievous" and described the sound as "suffocated". Olivia Horn of Pitchfork deemed the lyrical imagery "convoluted" as the track portrays Swift as both a witch and a circus animal, and Slant Magazine's Jonathan Keefe criticized the lyrics as overwritten, blemishing the song's attempt at showcasing Swift at her "most lacerating". In The New York Times, Jon Pareles lamented that the track lacked the "playful but self-questioning touch" of "Anti-Hero", making it "pretty much just sad or angry" and thus regress into "teenage petulance", and Lindsay Zoladz found it surprising that Swift "doesn't deliver this one with a (needed) wink" despite having "played dexterously with humor and irony elsewhere in her catalog". Beats Per Minute's John Wohlmacher described the composition as being "both too theatric and lo-fi at the same time" and the revengeful lyrics as confusing, given "the respect and adoration [Swift has] gotten from press and audiences".

On a positive side, PopMatters's Jeffrey Davies deemed the track the album's best, writing that it demonstrates a "vicious cycle" of Swift's detractors "still [providing] her with enough ammunition for new material". Laura Snapes from The Guardian thought that the "vengeful wrath" of the song contains some of Swift's most cutting lyrics and deemed it a "deservedly bitter, barbed update of the cutesier and more cloying 'Anti-Hero'". Writing for the Associated Press, Maria Sherman was an amalgam of Swift's past albums, namely the "musical ambitiousness" of Folklore and Evermore (both 2020) and the sharp "sensibilities" of Reputation (2017), but with more depth and complexities. The Hollywood Reporter's Ryan Fish ranked "Who's Afraid of Little Old Me?" fourth out of the 31 tracks on the album, deeming the portrayal of Swift's "witchy persona" compelling and saying that the production has a hook "[needing] to be shouted by a crowd in a stadium". Variety considered it one of the best 50 songs of 2024; Chris Willman said that while it was surprising for Swift to release an angry and vengeful song despite her "America's sweetheart" image for much of the year, it was justified for women at large and "wonderfully bizarre".

== Commercial performance ==
When The Tortured Poets Department was released, tracks from the album occupied the top 14 of the US Billboard Hot 100; "Who's Afraid of Little Old Me?" debuted at a peak of number nine on the chart, where Swift became the first artist to monopolize the top 14. In Australia, the song reached number nine on the ARIA Singles Chart and made her the artist with the most entries in a single week with 29. Elsewhere, "Who's Afraid of Little Old Me?" peaked at number nine on the Billboard Global 200 and reached the top 10 in Canada and New Zealand and the top 25 in Singapore (14), the Philippines (20), Portugal (22), Luxembourg (23), Switzerland (23), and Belgium (25). The song was certified triple platinum in Brazil, platinum in Australia, and gold in New Zealand and the United Kingdom.

== Live performances ==
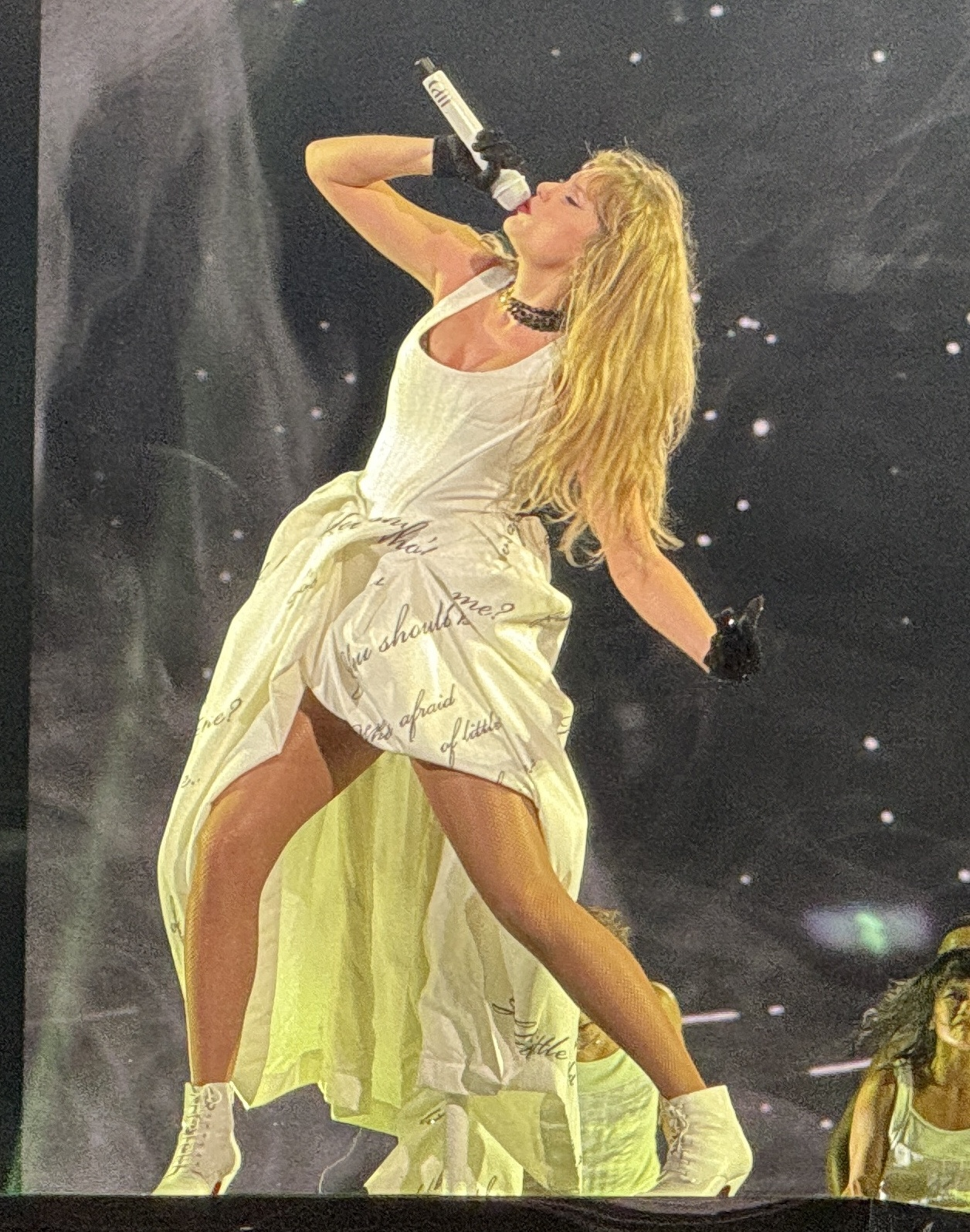
Swift performing "Who's Afraid of Little Old Me?" on the Eras Tour

Swift included "Who's Afraid of Little Old Me?" in the revamped set list for her sixth concert tour, the Eras Tour, starting from the May 2024 shows in Paris. She performed the song while standing atop a glass-plated platform that moved across the stage. Clash's Hannah Sinclair wrote that Swift was "rising and flying around the stage", while The Scotsman's David Hepburn said that she "actually [levitated] down our street", considering it the show's best performance because it had the "biggest singalong of the night". Billboard's Robert Levine deemed it a "live standout" among the set list's newly added songs, opining that it was exemplary of Swift's description of the Tortured Poets Department act as "Female Rage: the Musical". Willman placed the performance at number three on his list of the "40 Greatest Nightly Moments" from the Eras Tour.

The raised moving platform, dubbed "TayRoomba" or "Tayoomba" by Swift's fans, suffered a malfunction at the final New Orleans show of the Eras Tour on October 27, 2024. The platform was supposed to move toward Swift's backup dancers after she sang the line "But what if they did" during the first chorus, but remained stationary. Swift continued singing as she dismounted the platform to stand in the center of a circle formed by her backup dancers, before walking across the stage and performing new choreography with them. Some media publications, as well as Swift's fans, praised how Swift and the backup dancers handled the situation and seamlessly performed as if it were planned. Julia Guilbeau from The Times-Picayune/The New Orleans Advocate lauded how she managed "to still deliver an emotional performance" without "miss[ing] a beat".

== Personnel ==
Credits are adapted from the liner notes of The Tortured Poets Department.

- Taylor Swift – vocals, songwriter, producer
- Jack Antonoff – producer, programming, drums, Juno, Moog, bass, electric guitar, piano, M1, Mellotron, cello
- Sean Hutchinson – drums, engineering
- Michael Riddleberger – percussion, engineering
- Evan Smith – synthesizer, engineering
- Zem Audu – synthesizer, engineering
- Mikey Freedom Hart – synthesizer, engineering
- Aaron Dessner – piano
- Laura Sisk – engineering
- Oli Jacobs – engineering
- Joey Miller – engineering
- Jonathan Low – engineering
- Jack Manning – – engineering assistance
- Jon Sher – engineering assistance
- Jesse Solon Snider – engineering assistance
- Joe Caldwell – engineering assistance
- Serban Ghenea – mixing
- Bryce Bordone – mix engineering
- Randy Merrill – mastering

== Charts ==
Chart (2024)	Peak position
Argentina Hot 100 (Billboard)	85
Australia (ARIA)	9
Brazil Hot 100 (Billboard)	60
Canada Hot 100 (Billboard)	10
Czech Republic Singles Digital (ČNS IFPI)	44
Denmark (Tracklisten)	31
France (SNEP)	90
Global 200 (Billboard)	9
Greece International (IFPI)	16
Lithuania (AGATA)	55
Luxembourg (Billboard)	23
New Zealand (Recorded Music NZ)	10
Norway (VG-lista)	38
Philippines (Billboard)	20
Poland (Polish Streaming Top 100)	76
Portugal (AFP)	22
Singapore (RIAS)	14
Spain (Promusicae)	70
Sweden (Sverigetopplistan)	39
Swiss Streaming (Schweizer Hitparade)	23
UK Singles (Official Charts)	85
US Billboard Hot 100	9

== Certifications ==
Certifications for "Who's Afraid of Little Old Me?"
Region	Certification	Certified units/sales
Australia (ARIA)	Platinum	70,000^{‡}
Brazil (Pro-Música Brasil)	3× Platinum	120,000^{‡}
New Zealand (RMNZ)	Platinum	30,000^{‡}
United Kingdom (BPI)	Gold	400,000^{‡}
^{‡} Sales+streaming figures based on certification alone.
