= Joel Corry discography =

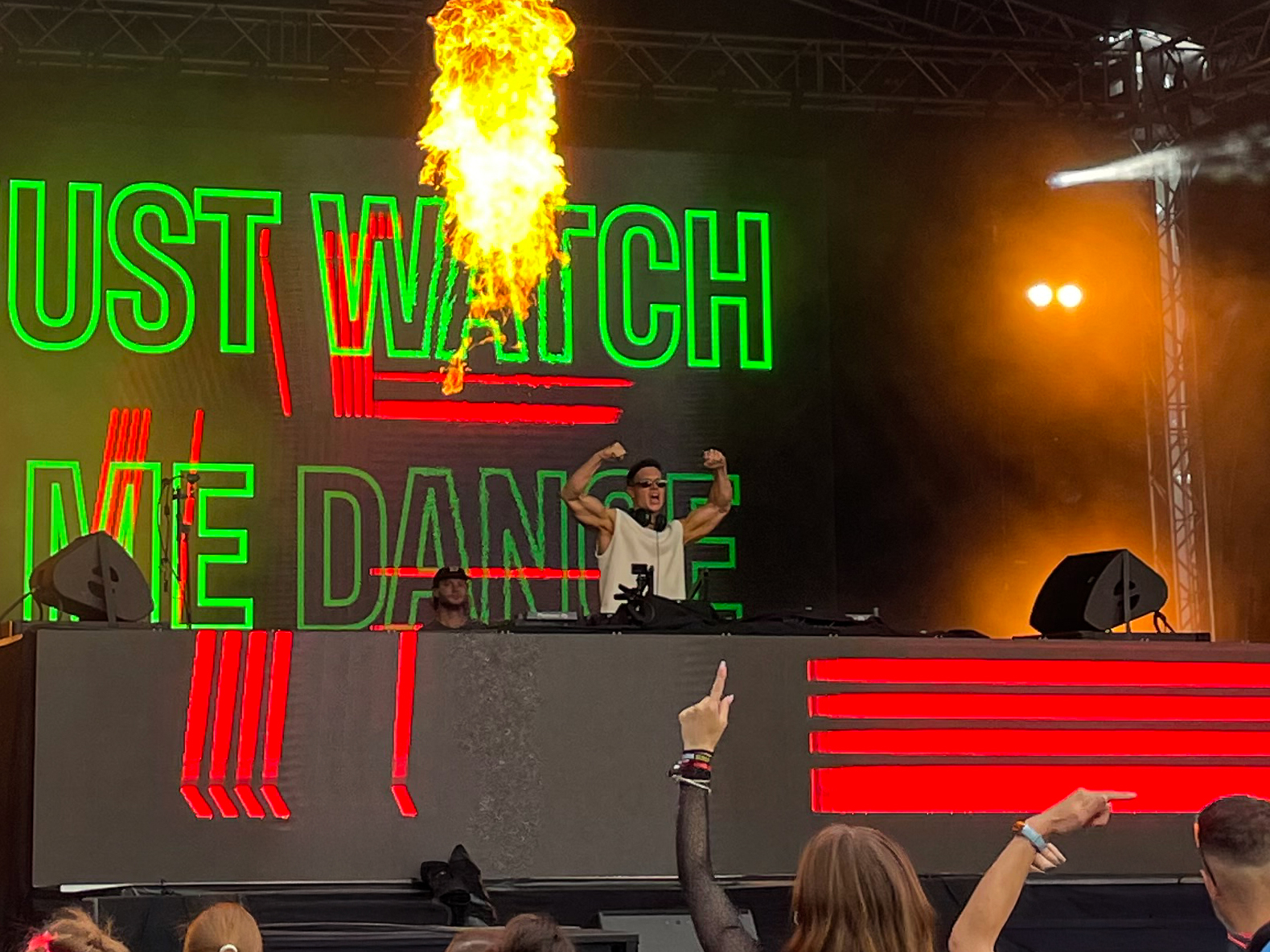
- Corry performing in 2025
- Studio albums: 1
- Singles: 42

English DJ and producer Joel Corry has released one studio album and 42 singles.

== Albums ==
=== Studio albums ===
List of compilation albums, with selected details and chart positions
| Title | Details | Peak chart positions | |
| Title | Details | UK | IRE |
|---|---|---|---|
| Another Friday Night | Released: 6 October 2023; Label: Perfect Havoc, Asylum, Warner; Format: CD, LP, digital download, streaming | 5 | 22 |

=== Extended plays ===
List of extended play (EP) releases with details
| Title | EP details | Track listing |
|---|---|---|
| Four for the Floor | Released: 23 June 2021; Label: Perfect Havoc, Asylum, Atlantic; Format: 12" vinyl; Limited edition release for Record Store Day | Side 1 "Head & Heart" (with MNEK) – 4:08 / "Bed" (with Raye and David Guetta) – 4:26; Side 2 "Lonely" – 4:02 / "Sorry" – 4:16 |

== Singles ==
List of singles, with selected chart positions and certifications
| Title | Year | Peak chart positions | | | | | | | | | | Certifications | Album |
| Title | Year | UK | AUS | AUT | BEL (FL) | DEN | GER | IRE | ITA | NL | NZ | Certifications | Album |
|---|---|---|---|---|---|---|---|---|---|---|---|---|---|
| "Back Again" | 2015 | — | — | — | — | — | — | — | — | — | — | | Non-album singles |
| "Light It Up" | 2015 | — | — | — | — | — | — | — | — | — | — | | Non-album singles |
| "Just Wanna" | 2017 | — | — | — | — | — | — | — | — | — | — | | Non-album singles |
| "All the Things" | 2017 | — | — | — | — | — | — | — | — | — | — | | Non-album singles |
| "All Night" | 2017 | — | — | — | — | — | — | — | — | — | — | | Non-album singles |
| "Sunlight" | 2017 | — | — | — | — | — | — | — | — | — | — | | Non-album singles |
| "Feel This Way" | 2017 | — | — | — | — | — | — | — | — | — | — | | Non-album singles |
| "Hurt" | 2018 | — | — | — | — | — | — | — | — | — | — | | Non-album singles |
| "All I Need" | 2018 | — | — | — | — | — | — | — | — | — | — | | Non-album singles |
| "Only You" | 2018 | — | — | — | — | — | — | — | — | — | — | | Non-album singles |
| "Good as Gold" (featuring Hayley May) | 2018 | — | — | — | — | — | — | — | — | — | — | | Non-album singles |
| "Fallen" (featuring Hayley May) | 2018 | — | — | — | — | — | — | — | — | — | — | | Non-album singles |
| "Sorry" | 2019 | 6 | 40 | — | — | — | — | 3 | — | — | — | BPI: 2× Platinum; ARIA: Platinum; RMNZ: Gold | Another Friday Night |
| "Lonely" | 2020 | 4 | — | — | — | — | — | 3 | — | — | — | BPI: 2× Platinum; RMNZ: Gold | Another Friday Night |
| "Head & Heart" (with MNEK) | 2020 | 1 | 2 | 5 | 1 | 4 | 4 | 1 | 7 | 1 | 5 | BPI: 5× Platinum; ARIA: 6× Platinum; BRMA: 2× Platinum; BVMI: 2× Platinum; FIMI: 3× Platinum; IFPI AUT: Platinum; IFPI DEN: 3× Platinum; NVPI: Platinum; RMNZ: 5× Platinum | Another Friday Night |
| "Bed" (with Raye and David Guetta) | 2021 | 3 | 20 | 48 | 9 | 40 | 34 | 3 | 35 | 4 | — (Note: "Bed" did not enter the NZ Top 40 Singles Chart, but peaked at number six on the NZ Hot Singles Chart.) | BPI: 2× Platinum; ARIA: 2× Platinum; BVMI: Gold; FIMI: Platinum; IFPI AUT: Platinum; IFPI DEN: Platinum; RMNZ: Platinum | Another Friday Night |
| "Out Out" (with Jax Jones featuring Charli XCX and Saweetie) | 2021 | 6 | 31 | 35 | — | 26 | 20 | 2 | 92 | 24 | — (Note: "Out Out" did not enter the NZ Top 40 Singles Chart, but peaked at number 27 on the NZ Hot Singles Chart.) | BPI: Platinum; ARIA: Gold; BVMI: Gold; FIMI: Platinum; IFPI AUT: Platinum; IFPI DEN: Platinum; RMNZ: Gold | Another Friday Night |
| "I Wish" (featuring Mabel) | 2021 | 17 | — | — | — | — | — | 16 | — | 33 | — (Note: "I Wish" did not enter the NZ Top 40 Singles Chart, but peaked at number 22 on the NZ Hot Singles Chart.) | BPI: Platinum | Another Friday Night |
| "What Would You Do?" (with David Guetta and Bryson Tiller) | 2022 | 21 | — | — | — | — | — | 32 | — | 30 | — (Note: "What Would You Do?" did not enter the NZ Top 40 Singles Chart, but peaked at number 11 on the NZ Hot Singles Chart.) | BPI: Gold | Another Friday Night |
| "History" (with Becky Hill) | 2022 | 18 | — | — | 29 | — | — | 13 | — | 28 | — (Note: "History" did not enter the NZ Top 40 Singles Chart, but peaked at number 12 on the NZ Hot Singles Chart.) | BPI: Gold | Another Friday Night |
| "Lionheart (Fearless)" (with Tom Grennan) | 2022 | 18 | — | — | 20 | — | — | 35 | — | 15 | — (Note: "Lionheart (Fearless)" did not enter the NZ Top 40 Singles Chart, but peaked at number 21 on the NZ Hot Singles Chart.) | BPI: Platinum | Another Friday Night |
| "Molly" (with Cedric Gervais) | 2022 | — | — | — | — | — | — | — | — | — | — | | Non-album singles |
| "Yeah" (with Glockenbach and Tenchi featuring ClockClock) | 2023 | — | — | — | — | — | — | — | — | — | — | | Non-album singles |
| "Nikes" (with Ron Carroll) | 2023 | — | — | — | — | — | — | — | — | — | — | | Non-album singles |
| "Do U Want Me Baby" (with Billen Ted and Elphi) | 2023 | — | — | — | — | — | — | — | — | — | — | | Another Friday Night |
| "Dance Around It" (with Caity Baser) | 2023 | 61 | — | — | — | — | — | 79 | — | — | — | | Another Friday Night |
| "0800 Heaven" (Note: "0800 Heaven" also features on Nathan Dawe's debut EP If Heaven Had a Phone Line.) (with Nathan Dawe and Ella Henderson) | 2023 | 9 | — | — | 21 | — | — | 13 | — | 4 | — | BPI: Platinum | Another Friday Night |
| "Desire" (with Icona Pop and Rain Radio) | 2023 | — | — | — | — | — | — | — | — | — | — | | Another Friday Night |
| "Drinkin'" (with MK and Rita Ora) | 2023 | 44 | — | — | — | — | — | — | — | — | — (Note: "Drinkin'" did not enter the NZ Top 40 Singles Chart, but peaked at number 39 on the NZ Hot Singles Chart.) | | Another Friday Night |
| "Hey DJ" | 2023 | 59 | — | — | — | — | — | — | — | — | — | | Another Friday Night |
| "Stay Together (Baby Baby)" (with Pickle and Vula) | 2024 | — | — | — | — | — | — | — | — | — | — | | Non-album singles |
| "Tonight (D.I.Y.A)" (with Jax Jones and Jason Derulo) | 2024 | — (Note: "Tonight (D. I. Y. A)" did not enter the UK Singles Chart, but peaked at number 23 on the UK Singles Downloads Chart.) | — | — | — | — | — | — | — | — | — | | Non-album singles |
| "Upside Down" (with Robin Schulz and Koppy) | 2024 | — | — | — | — | — | — | — | — | — | — | | Non-album singles |
| "Higher" (with Nathan Dawe featuring Sacha) | 2024 | — (Note: "Higher" did not enter the UK Singles Chart, but debuted and peaked at number 74 on the UK Singles Downloads Chart Top 100.) | — | — | — | — | — | — | — | — | — | | Non-album singles |
| "Be Alright" | 2024 | — | — | — | — | — | — | — | — | — | — | | Non-album singles |
| "Tears On My Piano" | 2025 | — | — | — | — | — | — | — | — | — | — | | Non-album singles |
| "I Love Ur GF" | 2025 | — | — | — | — | — | — | — | — | — | — | | Non-album singles |
| "Daydream" (with Jem Cooke) | 2025 | — | — | — | — | — | — | — | — | — | — | | Non-album singles |
| "Phases" (with Abi Flynn) | 2025 | — | — | — | — | — | — | — | — | — | — | | Non-album singles |
| "Stay A Little Longer" (with Galantis and Izzy Bizu) | 2025 | — | — | — | — | — | — | — | — | — | — | | Non-album singles |
| "Stuck in a Loop" | 2026 | — | — | — | — | — | — | — | — | — | — | | Non-album singles |
| "Devotion (Sweetest Emotion)" (with Rahh) | 2026 | — | — | — | — | — | — | — | — | — | — | | Non-album singles |
| "Whisper" | 2026 | — | — | — | — | — | — | — | — | — | — | | Non-album singles |
| "Don’t Go Breaking My Heart" (with Hannah Boleyn) | 2026 | — | — | — | — | — | — | — | — | — | — | | Non-album singles |
| "Shine" (with Esse) | 2026 | — | — | — | — | — | — | — | — | — | — | | |
"—" denotes a recording that did not chart or was not released.

=== Promotional singles ===
| Title | Year | Album |
|---|---|---|
| "Liquor Store" | 2022 | Non-album single |
| "The Parade" (featuring Da Hool) | 2022 | Another Friday Night |
| "What I Need" (with Lekota) | 2022 | Non-album single |

=== Remixes ===
| Title | Year | Artist |
|---|---|---|
| "Trampoline" (Joel Corry Remix) | 2019 | Shaed and Zayn |
| "I Don't Need Love" (Joel Corry Remix) | 2019 | Karen Harding and Wh0 |
| "Next Mistake" (Joel Corry Remix) | 2019 | Icona Pop |
| "We Got Love" (Joel Corry Remix) | 2019 | Sigala featuring Ella Henderson |
| "Buss Down" (Joel Corry Dub) | 2019 | Aitch featuring ZieZie |
| "Sad" (Joel Corry Remix) | 2019 | Chico Rose featuring Afrojack |
| "You Get What You Give (Music in You)" (Joel Corry Remix) | 2019 | Billy Da Kid featuring Natalie Gray |
| "You Get What You Give (Music in You)" (Joel Corry Dub) | 2019 | Billy Da Kid featuring Natalie Gray |
| "Unlovable" (Joel Corry Remix) | 2019 | Glowie |
| "Own It" (Joel Corry Remix) | 2019 | Stormzy featuring Ed Sheeran and Burna Boy |
| "Lonely" (VIP Mix) | 2020 | Joel Corry |
| "New Me" (Joel Corry Remix) | 2020 | Ella Eyre |
| "See The Sky" (Joel Corry Remix) | 2020 | Anabel Englund |
| "Better Off Without You" (Joel Corry Remix) | 2020 | Becky Hill featuring Shift K3Y |
| "Pour The Milk" (Joel Corry Remix) | 2020 | Robbie Doherty and Keees |
| "Details" (Joel Corry Remix) | 2020 | Oliver Heldens featuring Boy Matthews |
| "Rover" (Joel Corry Remix) | 2020 | S1mba featuring DTG |
| "Wherever You Are" (Joel Corry Remix) | 2020 | Kodaline |
| "Lay Your Head on Me" (Joel Corry Remix) | 2020 | Major Lazer featuring Marcus Mumford |
| "Head & Heart" (VIP Mix) | 2020 | Joel Corry featuring MNEK |
| "Smile" (Joel Corry Remix) | 2020 | Katy Perry |
| "Tick Tock" (Joel Corry Remix) | 2020 | Clean Bandit and Mabel featuring 24kGoldn |
| "Diamonds" (Joel Corry Remix) | 2020 | Sam Smith |
| "Body" (Joel Corry Remix) | 2021 | Megan Thee Stallion |
| "Psycho" (Joel Corry Remix) | 2021 | Maisie Peters |
| "Bad Habits" (Joel Corry Remix) | 2021 | Ed Sheeran |
| "Out Out" (Joel Corry VIP Remix) | 2021 | Joel Corry and Jax Jones featuring Charli XCX and Saweetie |
| "Feeling Good" (Joel Corry Remix) | 2021 | Nina Simone |
| "Good Ones" (Joel Corry Remix) | 2021 | Charli XCX |
| "In My Mind" (Joel Corry Remix) | 2021 | Alok and John Legend |
| "Don't Forget My Love" (Joel Corry Remix) | 2022 | Diplo and Miguel |
| "Take Me Back" (Joel Corry Remix) | 2022 | Lewis Thompson featuring David Guetta |
| "Summer Is Over" (Joel Corry Remix) | 2022 | KSI |
| "Hold Me Closer" (Joel Corry Remix) | 2022 | Elton John and Britney Spears |
| "DNA (Loving You)" (Joel Corry Remix) | 2023 | Billy Gillies featuring Hannah Boleyn |
| "Riverside MF" | 2024 | Sidney Samson and PAJANE |
| "Free" (Joel Corry Remix) | 2024 | Calvin Harris and Ellie Goulding |
| "Get Right" | 2025 | Jennifer Lopez |
| "Save Me Tonight" | 2026 | Jennifer Lopez |
