= Vibrations (disambiguation) =

Vibration refers to mechanical oscillations about an equilibrium point.

Vibrations or The Vibrations may also refer to:

== Music ==
- The Vibrations, an African-American soul vocal group from Los Angeles, California, United States
- Vibrations (Eurobeat label), a label of Eurobeat founded in 1995 by Luigi Stanga and Gino Caria
- Vibrations (song), a 2012 song by Jade Louise
- "Vibrations", a 2019 song by Ashley Tisdale from Symptoms
- ”Vibrations”, a 2018 song by Jake Miller from Silver Lining
- Vibrations (Milt Jackson album), a 1964 album by vibraphonist Milt Jackson
- Vibrations (Albert Ayler album), an alternative release of saxophonist Albert Ayler's 1965 album Ghosts
- Vibrations (The Three Sounds album), a 1966 album by the jazz group The Three Sounds
- Vibrations (Roy Ayers album), a 1976 album Roy Ayers album
- "Vibrations pt.1 pt.2", a song by Black Eyed Peas from Masters of the Sun Vol. 1

== Other ==
- Vibrations (film), a 1996 film directed and written by Michael Paseornek
- Vibrations (spiritual energy), the energy that practitioners of some esoteric, meditation and martial arts say they can feel
- Vibration (radio station), a radio station in France

== See also ==
- Vibrate (disambiguation)
- Vibrator (disambiguation)
- Vibrating (album), a 2022 studio album by American rock band Collective Soul
