= About Last Night... (album) =

- Standard cover

Studio album by Mabel
- Released: 15 July 2022
- Recorded: 2020–2021
- Genres: Pop; house; disco; R&B
- Length: 36:30
- Label: Polydor
- Producers: Tre Jean-Marie; MNEK; Jordan Riley; SG Lewis; Stargate; Sillkey; Jax Jones; Tazer; Raye; Bloodshy; Mr. Whistler; OzGo; Ilya; Steve Mac

Mabel chronology
High Expectations (2019)	About Last Night... (2022)	Mabel (2025)

Singles from About Last Night...
- 1. "Let Them Know" Released: 18 June 2021; 2. "Good Luck" Released: 18 March 2022; 3. "Overthinking" Released: 20 May 2022

About Last Night... is the second studio album by British singer Mabel. It was released on 15 July 2022 through Polydor Records, and serves as the follow-up to her debut album, High Expectations (2019). Production of the album took place during the COVID-19 pandemic, with the singer deciding to explore new sounds after watching TV shows such as Pose and RuPaul's Drag Race, while also listening to dance songs by Madonna, Whitney Houston and Cece Peniston.

A concept album that follows "the progress of a party, from arrival through romantic tension to break-up and final redemption", About Last Night... mixes synth-pop, disco, house and R&B with themes of love, empowerment and confidence. It was supported by three singles: "Let Them Know", "Good Luck" and "Overthinking".

Upon its release, the album received generally positive reviews from music critics, many of whom complimented the production and Mabel's new musical direction. The album was a commercial success, peaking at number two on the UK Albums Chart and making it her highest-charting album to date.

== Background ==
In February 2021, Mabel posted a snippet of a song and screenshots of fan messages about her second studio album on Instagram. In June 2021, Mabel posted a video on her social media containing a series of shots of her recording, performing and filming two music videos, which ended up being those of the first two singles from the album, "Let Them Know" and "Good Luck". The album's title was hinted at the end of the music video for "Let Them Know" and at the beginning of the music video for "Good Luck". Mabel officially announced the album on May 27, 2022.

== Singles ==
The album's lead single, "Let Them Know", was released on 18 June 2021. The song debuted at number 38 on the UK Singles Chart and it eventually peaked at number 19.

"Good Luck" featuring Jax Jones and Galantis was released as the second single from the album on 18 March 2022.

"Overthinking" featuring 24kGoldn was released as the third and final single off the album on 20 May 2022.

=== Promotional singles ===
"Let Love Go" featuring Lil Tecca and "Crying on the Dance Floor" were released as promotional singles from the album on 29 June and 12 July 2022 respectively. On 18 July 2022, Mabel released a music video for the song "LOL".

== Critical reception ==
Professional ratings
Aggregate scores
Source	Rating
Metacritic	72/100
Review scores
Source	Rating
Clash	6/10
The Daily Telegraph	4/5 stars
DIY	4/5 stars
The Guardian	4/5 stars
The Line of Best Fit	4/10
NME	4/5 stars

About Last Night... received generally positive reviews from music critics upon its release. At Metacritic, which assigns a normalised rating out of 100 to reviews from mainstream publications, the album received a weighted average score of 72, based on seven reviews. Elly Watson of DIY wrote that the album "boldly celebrates ballroom and dance culture", with "each song feel[ing] like you're wandering through a different room in a nightclub" and mixing "disco, dance, pop and R&B elements" while exploring "the highs and lows of the best night out of your life, and Mabel is the perfect party guide".

In a critical review for The Line of Best Fit, Dave Russell found the album "almost completely devoid of charisma, uniqueness or nerve" and "smothered under the weight of generic, radio-pandering production and derivative genre cosplay" with "lyrics that are vague to the point of meaninglessness". In contrast, NME contributor Hannah Mylrea gave the album four out of five stars, stating "'About Last Night...' leaves you with your ears ringing, hooks stuck in your head and a healthy dose of dancefloor catharsis that'll make you feel lighter."

== Commercial performance ==
About Last Night... debuted at number two on the UK Albums Chart, overtaking her debut studio album High Expectations, which peaked at number three in 2019. Elsewhere, the album debuted at four on the Scottish Albums Chart, becoming her highest-charting album there, and at 39 on the Irish Albums Chart.

== Promotion ==
On June 21, 2022, Mabel announced through her social media intimate shows promoting her album "About Last Night". Tickets went on sale the following day. Mabel announced her first headlining show in two years at Somerset House in London during the 2022 Summer Series. Previously, Mabel also announced her performances at festivals via her social media.

Date	City	Country	Venue	Opening Act
17 July 2022	London	UK	Somerset House	Gracey Henrie
22 July 2022	Liverpool	UK	Hangar 34	-
25 July 2022	Leeds	UK	The Wardrobe	-
26 July 2022	Birmingham	UK	HMV Vault	-
27 July 2022	Bristol	UK	Fleece	-
28 July 2022	Southampton	UK	Vinilo Record Store	-
29 July 2022	Kingston upon Thames	UK	PRYZM	-

== Track listing ==
About Last Night... track listing
No.	Title	Lyrics	Music	Producer(s)	Length
1.	"About Last Night..." (intro)	Mabel McVey	Rachel Keen; Uzoechi Emenike; Tre Jean-Marie; Jordan Riley; Nayla Nyassa	Jean-Marie; MNEK; Sillkey; Cameron Gower Poole^{[v]}	0:34
2.	"Animal"	McVey; Keen	Keen; Anton Göransson; Riley	Riley; Raye^{[c]}^{[v]}; Göransson^{[a]}; Poole^{[v]}	3:01
3.	"Let Them Know"	McVey; Keen; Emenike	Keen; Samuel George Lewis	SG Lewis; Raye^{[c]}^{[v]}; Poole^{[v]}	2:28
4.	"Shy"	McVey; Emenike	Jean-Marie; Tommy Brown; Göransson	Jean-Marie; MNEK; Göransson^{[c]}; Tommy Brown^{[c]}; Poole^{[v]}	3:17
5.	"Definition"	McVey; Emenike	Jean-Marie; Brown; Göransson	Jean-Marie; MNEK; Göransson^{[c]}; Brown^{[c]}; Poole^{[v]}	3:12
6.	"Good Luck" (with Jax Jones and Galantis)	McVey; Camille Purcell; Emenike	Jean-Marie; Timucin Aluo; Tomi Adenle; Christian Karlsson; Jordi de Fluiter	Jax Jones; Tazer; Bloodshy; Mark Ralph^{[a]}; Kamille^{[c]}^{[v]}; Mr. Whistler^{[c]}	3:55
7.	"Take Your Name" (interlude)	McVey; Keen	Riley; Poole^{[v]}	Riley	1:17
8.	"Let Love Go" (featuring Lil Tecca)	McVey; Keen; Emenike; Tyshane Thompson; Tyler-Justin Sharpe	Goransson; Riley; Emenike; Jean-Marie; Lewis	SG Lewis; Goransson^{[a]}; Neave Applebaum^{[a]}; Ralph^{[a]}	2:53
9.	"Overthinking" (with 24kGoldn)	McVey; Jocelyn Donald; Golden von Jones	Mikkel Storleer Eriksen; Tor Erik Hermansen	Stargate	2:54
10.	"Crying on the Dance Floor"	McVey; Gregory Hein	Eriksen; Hermansen	Stargate	3:23
11.	"I Love Your Girl"	McVey; Emily Warren	Hein; Rami Yacoub; Ilya Salmanzadeh; Oscar Gorres	Görres; Ilya; Rami^{[v]}	3:09
12.	"When the Party's Over"	McVey; Keen; Emenike	Emenike; Jean-Marie; Riley	Jean-Marie; MNEK; Riley; Poole^{[v]}	2:55
13.	"LOL" (bonus track)	McVey; Keen	Keen; Steve McCutcheon	Steve Mac; Raye^{[v]}; Poole^{[v]}	3:32
Total length:					36:30

Digital edition bonus tracks
No.	Title	Lyrics	Music	Producer(s)	Length
14.	"I Wish" (Joel Corry featuring Mabel)	McVey; Emenike	Poppy Baskcomb; Paul Harris; Jessica Glynne; Harlee Sudworth; Aminata Kabba; Joel Corry; Robert Harvey; Lewis Thompson; Neave Applebaum	Corry; New Levels; Poole^{[v]}	3:01
15.	"Deal or No Deal" (with A1 x J1)	McVey; A1 x J1; Marlon Roudette	Errol Bellot; Jordan Reid; Steven Marsden	Crumz; K1ng; Ralph^{[a]}	3:01
Total length:					42:32

Apple Music edition bonus tracks
No.	Title	Lyrics	Music	Producer(s)	Length
16.	"Let Love Go" (acoustic)	McVey; Keen; Emenike	Goransson; Riley; Jean-Marie; Lewis	Ashton Miranda; Poole^{[v]}	2:59
17.	"Toxic" (Britney Spears acoustic cover)	Cathy Dennis; Karlsson	Pontus Winnberg; Henrik Jonback	Miranda; Poole^{[v]}	3:06
18.	"Overthinking" (slowed and reverb; with 24kGoldn)	McVey; Donald	Eriksen; Hermansen	Stargate; Poole	3:38
19.	"Crying on the Dance Floor" (calm string version)	McVey; Hein	Eriksen; Hermansen	Miranda; Poole^{[v]}	3:39
20.	"Let Them Know" (music video)
21.	"Good Luck" (with Jax Jones and Galantis; music video)
22.	"Overthinking" (with 24kGoldn; music video)
Total length:					55:54

=== Notes ===
- ^{^[a]} signifies an additional producer
- ^{^[c]} signifies a co-producer
- ^{^[v]} signifies a vocal producer
- The vinyl version of the album includes the solo versions of "Let Love Go" (3:28) and "Overthinking" (2:47).

== Personnel ==
Musicians

- Mabel – vocals (all tracks), background vocals (3, 11)
- MNEK – background vocals (1, 14); bass, drums, keyboards, programming, synthesizer (4, 5, 12); vocal arrangement (5)
- Tre Jean-Marie – keyboards (1, 4, 5, 8, 12); bass, programming, synthesizer (1, 4, 5, 12); 5-string banjo (4), drums (4, 5, 12)
- Nayla Nyassa – piano, synthesizer (1)
- Rosie Danvers – strings (1, 2, 4, 7, 12), cello (19)
- Anton Göransson – bass (2, 8); drums, keyboards, programming, synthesizer (2)
- Jordan Riley – bass (2, 8, 12), drums (2, 12), keyboards (2, 12), programming (2, 7, 12), strings (2, 7), synthesizer (2)
- Juri Uchishiba – strings (2)
- Raye – background vocals (3)
- SG Lewis – programming, synthesizer (3, 8); bass, drums, keyboards (3)
- Hayley Yum – background vocals (4, 5)
- Myra Mwang'ombe – background vocals (5)
- Jax Jones – programming (6)
- Neave Applebaum – brass band (8); keyboards, programming (14)
- Lil Tecca – vocals (8)
- 24kGoldn – vocals (9, 18)
- Oscar Görres – background vocals, bass, drums, guitar, keyboards, percussion, programming (11)
- Harlee – background vocals (14)
- No No – background vocals (14)
- Lewis Thompson – keyboards, programming (14)
- Joel Corry – programming (14)
- Rob Harvey – whistle (14)
- Kelly Barnes – additional vocals (15)
- Hal Ritson – keyboards, programming (15)
- Michele Balduzzi – keyboards, programming (15)
- Richard Adlam – keyboards, programming (15)
- A1 – vocals (15)
- J1 – vocals (15)
- Mike Hough – background vocals (16, 17, 19)
- Victoria Akintola – background vocals (16, 17, 19)
- Thomas Totten – guitar (16, 17)
- Ashton Miranda – piano (16, 17, 19)
- Meghan Cassidy – viola (19)
- Jenny Sacha – violin (19)
- Zara Benyounes – violin (19)

Technical

- Stuart Hawkes – mastering (1–13, 16–19)
- Kevin Grainger – mastering, mixing (14)
- JRocs – mastering, mixing (15)
- Phil Tan – mixing (1, 2, 4, 5, 7, 12)
- Josh Gudwin – mixing (3)
- Mark Ralph – mixing (6, 8)
- Mark "Spike" Stent – mixing (9, 10, 13, 18)
- Serban Ghenea – mixing (11)
- Cameron Gower Poole – mixing (16, 17, 19), engineering (9, 18)
- SG Lewis – engineering (3, 8)
- Nick Mac – engineering (9, 18)
- Mikkel S. Eriksen – engineering (9, 10, 18)
- Tor Erik Hermansen – engineering (9, 18)
- John Hanes – engineering, mix engineering (11)
- Lewis Thompson – engineering (14)
- Neave Applebaum – engineering (14)
- Isabel Gracefield – engineering (19)
- Bill Zimmerman – mix engineering (1, 2, 4, 5, 7, 12), mixing assistance (13)
- Emre Ramazanoglu – immersive mix engineering (16–18)
- Oscar Görres – recording arrangement (11)
- Heidi Wang – mixing assistance (3)
- Matt Wolach – mixing assistance (9, 13, 18)
- Michael Freeman – mixing assistance (10)
- Bryce Bordone – mixing assistance (11)
- Thomas Warren – engineering assistance (9, 10, 18)

== Charts ==
Chart performance for About Last Night...
Chart (2022)	Peak position
German Albums (Offizielle Top 100)	100
Irish Albums (Official Charts)	39
Scottish Albums (Official Charts)	4
Spanish Vinyls (PROMUSICAE)	48
Swiss Albums (Schweizer Hitparade)	91
UK Albums (Official Charts)	2

== Release history ==
Release dates and formats for About Last Night...
Region	Date	Format(s)	Label	Ref.
Various	15 July 2022	Cassette; CD; digital download; streaming; vinyl	Polydor UK	

== See also ==
- List of 2022 albums
- List of UK top-ten albums in 2022
