= Taser (disambiguation) =

A Taser is an electroshock weapon.

Taser or Tazer may refer to:

- Taser International, the former name of Axon, a firm which makes tasers and other items
- Tasar, a type of sailboat
- Tazer (musician), a British musician
- "Tazer", a song on the soundtrack for the video game Age of Empires 2

== See also ==
- Tazers, an American punk rock band
