= Another Friday Night =

- Primary cover. The first digital and physical release cover featured just the purple text against an orange background.

Studio album by Joel Corry
- Released: 14 July 2023
- Recorded: 2018–2023
- Length: 49:47
- Labels: Perfect Havoc; Asylum; Warner
- Producers: Joel Corry; Neave Applebaum; Lewis Thompson; Punctual; Jon Shave; David Guetta; Billen Ted; Tre Jean-Marie; MK; Nathan Dawe; Digital Farm Animals; Kolidescopes; Giorgio Tuinfort; Jax Jones; Parisi; Rain Radio; Bl3ss; Mojam; Da Hool

Joel Corry chronology
Four for the Floor (2021)	Another Friday Night (2023)

Singles from Another Friday Night
- 1. "Sorry" Released: 5 April 2019; 2. "Lonely" Released: 24 January 2020; 3. "Head & Heart" Released: 3 July 2020; 4. "Bed" Released: 26 February 2021; 5. "Out Out" Released: 13 August 2021; 6. "I Wish" Released: 29 October 2021; 7. "The Parade" Released: 4 February 2022; 8. "What Would You Do?" Released: 18 April 2022; 9. "History" Released: 5 August 2022; 10. "Lionheart (Fearless)" Released: 21 October 2022; 11. "Do U Want Me Baby?" Released: 14 April 2023; 12. "Dance Around It" Released: 12 May 2023; 13. "0800 Heaven" Released: 9 June 2023; 14. "Desire" Released: 14 July 2023; 15. "Drinkin'" Released: 25 August 2023; 16. "Do You Mind" Released: 4 October 2023; 17. "Hey DJ" Released: 5 October 2023

Another Friday Night is the debut studio album by English DJ and producer Joel Corry, originally released digitally on 14 July 2023 with 13 tracks before its official release on 6 October 2023 through Perfect Havoc, Warner and Asylum Records. It includes collaborations with MNEK, MK, Rita Ora, Nathan Dawe, Ella Henderson, Tom Grennan, Becky Hill, Raye, David Guetta, Jax Jones, Charli XCX, Saweetie, Icona Pop, Rain Radio, J Hart, Caity Baser, Elphi, Billen Ted, Mabel, Bryson Tiller and Da Hool.

All songs but the title track were released as singles from the album, with the first, "Sorry", released in April 2019. Six singles reached the top 10 of the UK Singles Chart, including the 2020 number one "Head & Heart" with MNEK. The album reached number five on the UK Albums Chart and was certified gold by the British Phonographic Industry (BPI).

== Track listing ==
Another Friday Night track listing
No.	Title	Writer(s)	Producer(s)	Length
1.	"Another Friday Night"	Joel Corry; Lewis Thompson; Ryan Campbell; Uzoechi Emenike; Tre Jean-Marie	Corry; Thompson; Jean-Marie; Jon Shave^{[a]}	2:30
2.	"Drinkin'" (with MK featuring Rita Ora)	Corry; Neave Applebaum; Marc Kinchen; Samantha Harper; Jonathan Shave; Rita Ora; Chancellor Bennett; Kevin Rhomberg; Nicolas Segal; Louis Kevin Celestin	Corry; MK; Applebaum; Shave	2:29
3.	"Hey DJ"	Corry; Applebaum; Pablo Bowman; John Morgan; William Lansley; Rochelle "Roc Star" Griffith	Corry; Applebaum; Punctual	2:37
4.	"0800 Heaven" (with Nathan Dawe and Ella Henderson)	Corry; Lansley; Morgan; Nathan Dawe; Gabriella Henderson; Maegan Cottone; Joe Barbe	Corry; Nathan Dawe; Punctual	2:39
5.	"Lionheart (Fearless)" (with Tom Grennan)	Corry; Thompson; Applebaum; Thomas Grennan; Michael Needle; Jamie Scott; James Murray; Mustafa Omer; Nicholas Gale	Corry; Thompson; Applebaum; Digital Farm Animals; Jamie Scott^{[v]}; Mike Needle^{[v]}	3:06
6.	"History" (featuring Becky Hill)	Corry; Thompson; Applebaum; Robert Harvey; Clementine Douglas; Rebecca Hill; Karen Poole	Corry; Thompson; Applebaum	2:56
7.	"Head & Heart" (featuring MNEK)	Corry; Thompson; Applebaum; Harvey; Jonathan Courtidis; Daniel Dare; Emenike; Kashif Siddiqui	Corry; Thompson; Applebaum; Kolidescopes	2:46
8.	"Bed" (with David Guetta featuring Raye)	Corry; Thompson; Applebaum; Pierre Guetta; Giorgio Tuinfort; Rachel Keen; Janee Bennett	Corry; Thompson; Applebaum; David Guetta; Tuinfort; Cameron Gower Poole^{[v]}; Jenna Felsenthal^{[v]}	2:58
9.	"Out Out" (with Jax Jones featuring Charli XCX and Saweetie)	Corry; Thompson; Applebaum; Timucin Aluo; Noemia "NONÔ" Felippe; Bennett; Amber Van Day; Roxanne Emery; Holly Fletcher; Camille Purcell; Taylor Parks; Charlotte Aitchison; Diamonte Harper; Paul Van Haver	Corry; Thompson; Applebaum; Jax Jones	2:42
10.	"Desire" (featuring Icona Pop and Rain Radio)	Corry; Samuel Brennan; Thomas Hollings; Carla Monroe; Van Day; Joshua Wilkinson; Marco Parisi; Giampaolo Parisi; Aino Jawo; Caroline Hjelt	Corry; Billen Ted; PARISI; Rain Radio; BL3SS	2:39
11.	"Do You Mind" (featuring J Hart)	Corry; Applebaum; Edward Drewett; Wayne Hector; Steve McCutcheon; Sarah Solovay; James Abrahart	Corry; Applebaum	2:47
12.	"Dance Around It" (featuring Caity Baser)	Corry; Morgan; Lansley; Catherine Baser	Corry; Punctual	2:24
13.	"Do U Want Me Baby?" (with Billen Ted featuring Elphi)	Corry; Brennan; Hollings; Samuel Robinson; Murray; Omer; Poppy Baskcomb	Corry; Billen Ted; Mojam	2:23
14.	"Sorry"	David Alan Edwards; Dean Josiah Mundle; Nicholas James Reid; Steve Edmond Heyliger	Corry; Thompson	3:08
15.	"Lonely"	Corry; Thompson; Applebaum; Harvey; Harlee Sudworth	Corry; Thompson; Applebaum	3:10
16.	"I Wish" (featuring Mabel)	Corry; Thompson; Applebaum; Harvey; Sudworth; Aminata Kabba; Emenike; Baskcomb; Paul Harris; Jessica Glynne	Corry; Thompson; Applebaum; Poole^{[v]}	3:01
17.	"What Would You Do?" (with David Guetta featuring Bryson Tiller)	Corry; Thompson; Applebaum; Guetta; Siddiqui; Emenike; R. Campbell; Corey Sanders; Bryson Tiller; Elle Campbell; Joseph Green	Corry; Thompson; Applebaum; Guetta	2:54
18.	"The Parade" (with Da Hool)	Corry; Frank Tomiczek	Corry; Da Hool	2:38
Total length:				49:47

Notes

- ^{^[a]} signifies an additional producer
- ^{^[v]} signifies a vocal producer
- "Another Friday Night" includes vocals by MNEK.
- "Sorry" includes vocals by Hayley May.
- "Lonely" includes vocals by Harlee.
- The original digital compilation included 13 tracks, with "Desire" moved to the first spot and the rest in order, but omitting "Another Friday Night", "Drinkin'", "Hey DJ", "Do You Mind" and "The Parade".
- The first CD edition contained 14 tracks, including "Another Friday Night" but omitting the other four mentioned above. It included "Desire" after "Out Out" as on the main edition.

== Charts ==
=== Weekly charts ===
Weekly chart performance for Another Friday Night
Chart (2023)	Peak position
Irish Albums (Official Charts)	22
Scottish Albums (Official Charts)	2
UK Albums (Official Charts)	5
UK Dance Albums (Official Charts)	1

=== Year-end charts ===
2023 year-end chart performance for Another Friday Night
Chart (2023)	Position
UK Albums (OCC)	98

2024 year-end chart performance for Another Friday Night
Chart (2024)	Position
Australian Dance Albums (ARIA)	8
UK Albums (OCC)	72

== Certifications ==
Certifications for Another Friday Night
Region	Certification	Certified units/sales
Canada (Music Canada)	Platinum	80,000^{‡}
Netherlands (NVPI)	Platinum	40,000^{‡}
United Kingdom (BPI)	Gold	100,000^{‡}
^{‡} Sales+streaming figures based on certification alone.
