= Monsta Boy =

British electronic music duo

- Origin: Nottingham, England
- Genres: UK garage
- Years active: 1998–present
- Labels: Locked On; XL
- Members: David "Dangerous" Edwards; Steve "Sticks" Heyliger
- Website: monstaboy.com

Monsta Boy are a UK garage duo consisting of David Edwards and Steve Heyliger. Active since 1998, they are best known for the 2000 hit, "Sorry (I Didn't Know)" featuring singer Denzie.

"Sorry (I Didn't Know)" reached No. 25 on the UK Singles Chart and No. 1 on the UK Dance Singles Chart. In 2021, the song was certified silver by the BPI. A 2019 cover by English DJ and producer Joel Corry charted higher, peaking at No. 6 in the UK and No. 3 in Ireland, as well as also reaching No. 1 on the UK Dance Singles Chart.

The duo continue to perform in the clubs and at garage events across the UK.
