= Roy Ayers =

American funk, soul and jazz composer (1940–2025)

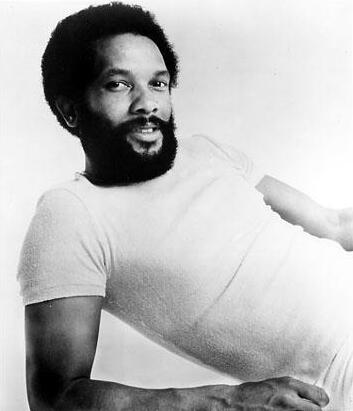
- Ayers in 1976

Background information
- Born: Roy Edward Ayers Jr. September 10, 1940; Los Angeles, California, U.S.
- Died: March 4, 2025 (aged 84) New York City, U.S.
- Genres: Post-bop; jazz-funk; acid jazz; soul
- Occupations: Musician; composer; singer; band leader; record producer
- Instruments: Vocals; vibraphone; keyboards
- Years active: 1962–2023
- Labels: Atlantic; Polydor; Ichiban; Golden Mink; Nature Sounds; Columbia
- Spouse: Argerie
- Website: royayers.com

Roy Edward Ayers Jr. (September 10, 1940 – March 4, 2025) was an American vibraphonist, record producer, and composer. Ayers began his career as a post-bop jazz artist, releasing several studio albums with Atlantic Records, before his tenure at Polydor Records beginning in the 1970s, during which he helped to pioneer jazz-funk. He was a key figure in the acid jazz movement, and has been described as "The Godfather of Neo Soul". He was best known for his compositions "Everybody Loves the Sunshine", "Running Away", and "Freaky Deaky" and others that charted in the 1970s. At one time, Ayers was listed among the performers whose music was most often sampled by rappers.

== Early life ==
Roy Edward Ayers Jr. was born in Los Angeles on September 10, 1940. He grew up in a family of musicians, where his father played trombone and his mother played piano. At the age of five, he was given his first pair of vibraphone mallets by Lionel Hampton. The area of Los Angeles that Ayers grew up in, South Park (later known as South Central), was at the center of the Southern California Black music scene. He attended Thomas Jefferson High School that formed a formative part of the Central Avenue jazz scene. During high school, Ayers sang in the church choir and fronted a band named the Latin Lyrics, in which he played steel guitar and piano. His high school, Thomas Jefferson High School, produced various talented musicians, such as Dexter Gordon.

== Career ==
=== 1960s–1980s ===
Ayers started recording as a bebop sideman in 1962. In 1963, he released his debut studio album West Coast Vibes featuring a collaboration with the saxophonist Curtis Amy. He rose to prominence when he dropped out of Los Angeles City College and joined jazz flautist Herbie Mann in 1966.

In the early 1970s, Ayers formed his own band, Roy Ayers Ubiquity, a name he chose because ubiquity meant a state of being everywhere at the same time.

Ayers was responsible for the highly regarded soundtrack to Jack Hill's 1973 blaxploitation film Coffy, which starred Pam Grier. He played Elgin in Idaho Transfer the same year. He later moved from a jazz-funk sound to R&B, as heard on Mystic Voyage (1975), which featured the songs "Evolution" and the underground disco hit "Brother Green (The Disco King)", as well as the title track from his studio album Everybody Loves the Sunshine (1976).

In 1977, Ayers produced an album by the group RAMP, Come into Knowledge. That fall, he had his biggest hit with "Running Away".

In late 1979, Ayers scored his only top ten single on Billboard's Hot Disco/Dance chart with "Don't Stop the Feeling", which was also the leadoff single from his studio album No Stranger to Love (1980). The title track was sampled in Jill Scott's 2000 song "Watching Me" from her debut studio album Who Is Jill Scott?: Words and Sounds Vol. 1.

In the late 1970s, Ayers toured Nigeria for six weeks with Afrobeat innovator Fela Kuti, one of Africa's best known musicians. In 1980, Phonodisk released Music of Many Colors in Nigeria, featuring one side led by Ayers' group and the other led by Africa '70.

In 1981, Ayers produced a studio album for the singer Sylvia Striplin, Give Me Your Love (Uno Melodic Records, 1981). That same year he released his own studio album, Africa, Center of the World, on Polydor Records along with James Bedford and Ayers's bassist William Henry Allen. Allen can be heard talking to his daughter on the track "Intro/The River Niger". The album was recorded at the Sigma Sound Studios in Philadelphia, PA.

In 1982, Ayers collaborated with Rick James for the album Throwin' Down, appearing in the opening track "Dance Wit' Me" in a vibraphone solo. They are said to have been close friends.

In 1984, he released the studio album In the Dark, released by Columbia Records and produced by bassist Stanley Clarke. The album produced the 12" single release "Love Is in the Feel" which, along with other tracks on the album, promoted the use of a LinnDrum, an instrument which gained enormous popularity among pop and jazz-funk musicians from 1982 to 1985. At this time Ayers' music was promoted extensively by UK BBC Radio 1 disc jockey (DJ) Robbie Vincent.

Ayers performed a solo on John "Jellybean" Benitez's production of Whitney Houston's "Love Will Save the Day" from her second multi-Platinum studio album Whitney. The single was released in July 1988 by Arista Records.

Ayers has played his live act for millions of people across the globe, including Japan, Australia, England, and other parts of Europe.

Ayers was known for helping to popularize feel-good music in the 1970s. He stated "I like that happy feeling all of the time, so that ingredient is still there. I try to generate that because it's the natural way I am". This philosophy was reflected throughout all his musical output, whether it was funk, salsa, jazz, rock, soul or hip-hop.

=== 1990s–2020s ===
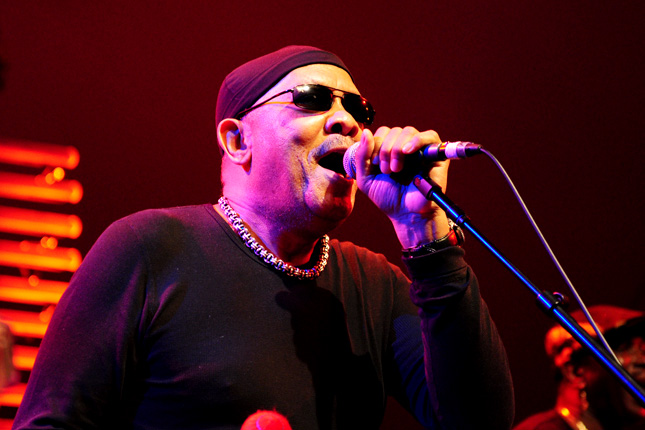
Ayers performing in Perth, Australia, 2011

In 1992, Ayers released two studio albums, Drive and Wake Up, for the hip-hop label Ichiban Records. In 1993, he appeared on the record Guru's Jazzmatazz Vol. 1, playing vibraphone on the song "Take a Look (At Yourself)". The following year he appeared on the Red Hot Organization's compilation album Stolen Moments: Red Hot + Cool. The album, intended to raise awareness and funds in support of the AIDS epidemic in the African-American community, was heralded as "Album of the Year" by Time magazine.

During the 2000s and 2010s, Ayers ventured into electronic dance music, collaborating with such stalwarts of the genre as Masters at Work, Pépé Bradock, 4hero and Kerri Chandler. Ayers founded two record labels, Uno Melodic and Gold Mink Records. The first released several studio albums, including Sylvia Striplin's, while the second folded after a few singles.

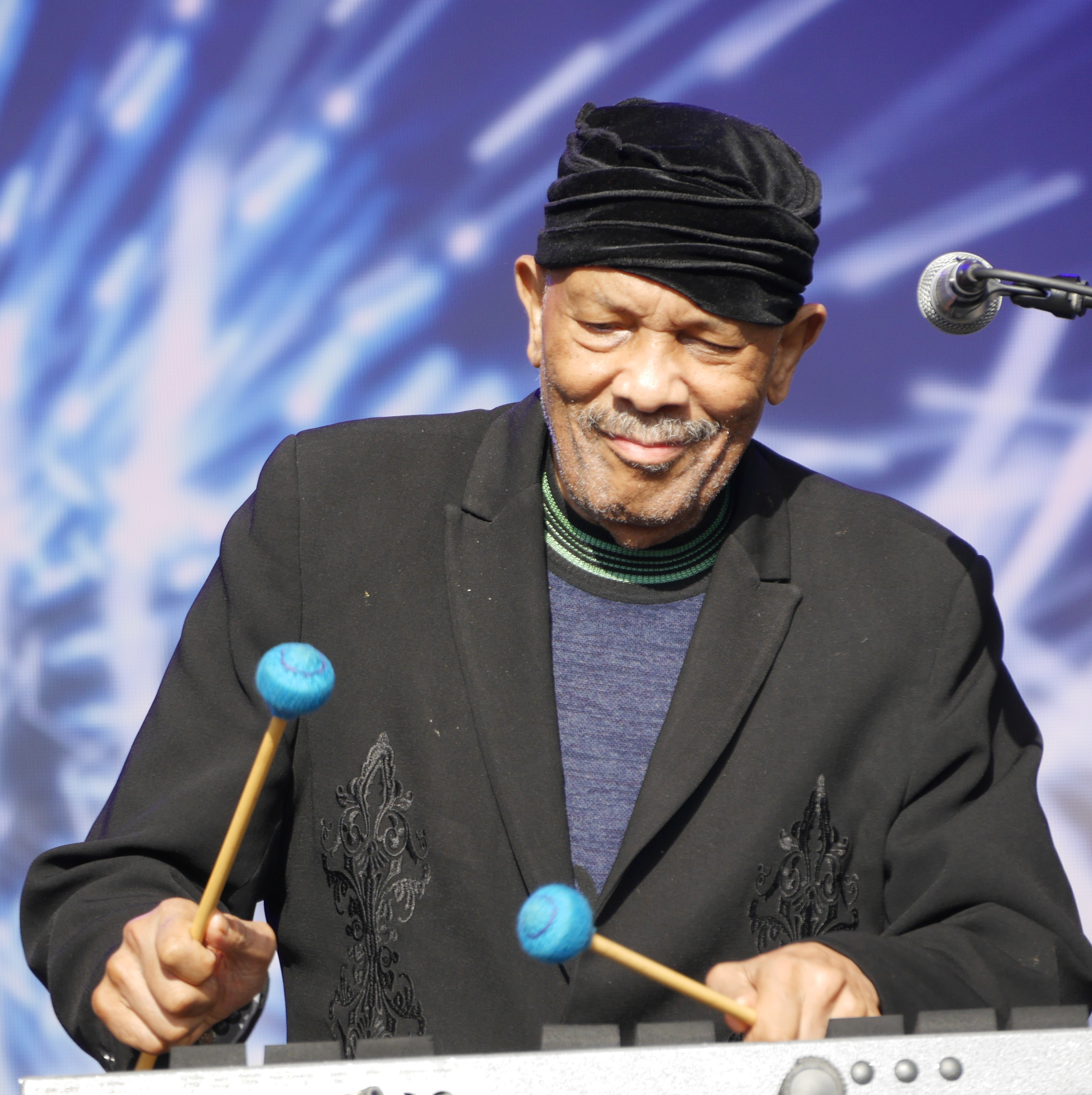
Ayers playing a MalletKAT at the Glastonbury Festival in Pilton, Somerset, England, 2019

In 2004, Ayers put out a collection of unreleased recordings called Virgin Ubiquity: Unreleased recordings 1976–1981, which allowed fans to hear cuts that did not make it onto the Polydor albums from his more popular years. He also worked in collaborations with soul singer Erykah Badu and other artists on his 2004 album Mahogany Vibes.

Ayers hosted the fictitious radio station "Fusion FM" in the video game Grand Theft Auto IV (2008).

In 2015, he played vibraphone on Tyler, the Creator's fourth studio album Cherry Bomb on the track "Find Your Wings". He continued to perform live until 2023.

== Personal life and death ==
Ayers married his wife Argerie in the early 1970s and together they had three children. He also had a son, the writer Nabil Ayers, with a woman who asked to have a child with no strings attached. His daughter Ayana was also managing him at the time of his death.

Ayers died at a hospital in Manhattan, New York, on March 4, 2025, at the age of 84, after suffering from a long illness.

== Awards and influence ==
A documentary, The Roy Ayers Project, featuring Ayers and artists who had sampled his music or had been influenced by him and his music, had been in development for several years. The Roy Ayers Project was rebranded as "Roy Ayers Connection", highlighting Ayers and all the people and things he was connected to. The Roy Ayers Project debuted a short film entitled “Roy Ayers is…” at Grand Performances on August 1st, 2026, celebrating the life and legacy of Roy Ayers.

Pharrell Williams cited Ayers as one of his key musical heroes.

Ayers was a recipient of the Congress of Racial Equality Lifetime Achievement Award.

== Discography ==
=== As leader ===
- West Coast Vibes (United Artists, 1963)
- Virgo Vibes (Atlantic, 1967)
- Stoned Soul Picnic (Atlantic, 1968)
- Daddy Bug (Atlantic, 1969)
- All Blues [12" single] (Roy Ayers Quartet, Columbia, 1969)
- Unchain My Heart (Roy Ayers Quartet, Columbia, 1970)
- Ubiquity (Polydor, 1970)
- He's Coming (Polydor, 1972)
- Live at the Montreux Jazz Festival (Polydor, 1972)
- Red Black & Green (Polydor, 1973)
- Coffy (1973)
- Virgo Red (Polydor, 1973)
- Change Up the Groove (Polydor, 1974)
- A Tear to a Smile (Polydor, 1975)
- Mystic Voyage (Polydor, 1975)
- Daddy Bug & Friends (Atlantic, 1976)
- Everybody Loves the Sunshine (Polydor, 1976)
- Vibrations (Polydor, 1976)
- Lifeline (Polydor, 1977)
- Let's Do It (Polydor, 1978)
- You Send Me (Polydor, 1978)
- Step in to Our Life (Polydor, 1978)
- Starbooty (Elektra, 1978)
- Fever (Polydor, 1979)
- No Stranger to Love (Polydor, 1979)
- Prime Time (Polydor, 1980)
- Love Fantasy (Polydor, 1980)
- Africa, Center of the World (Polydor, 1981)
- Feeling Good (Polydor, 1982)
- Lots of Love (Uno Melodic, 1983)
- In the Dark (Columbia, 1984)
- You Might Be Surprised (Columbia, 1985)
- I'm the One (For Your Love Tonight) (Columbia, 1987)
- Drive (Ichiban, 1988) reissue of Lots of Love
- Wake Up (Ichiban, 1989)
- Searchin' (Jazz House, 1991)
- Hot (Jazz House, 1992)
- Good Vibrations (Jazz House, 1993)
- The Essential Groove Live (Jazz House, 1994)
- Nasté (Groovetown/RCA, 1995)
- Mahogany Vibe (AFI/Rapster, 2004)
- King of the Vibes (Vivid Sound, 2011)
