= Love Fantasy =

1980 studio album by Roy Ayers

Studio album by Roy Ayers
- Released: 1980
- Studio: Electric Lady, New York City; Sigma Sound, New York City
- Genre: Jazz-funk
- Length: 40:07
- Label: Polydor
- Producer: Roy Ayers

Roy Ayers chronology
No Stranger to Love (1979)	Love Fantasy (1980)	Prime Time (1980)

Singles from Love Fantasy
- 1. "Rock Your Roll" Released: 1980; 2. "(Sometimes) Believe In Yourself" Released: 1980; 3. "Love Fantasy" Released: 1980

Professional ratings
Review scores
Source	Rating
AllMusic	3/5 stars

Love Fantasy is a studio album by American musician Roy Ayers. It was released in 1980 through Polydor Records. The recording sessions for the album took place at Electric Lady Studios and Sigma Sound Studios in New York City.

== Track listing ==
All tracks are written by Roy Ayers, except for track 3 written with Cindy Prioleau.

No.	Title	Length
1.	"Rock You Roll"	6:29
2.	"Betcha Gonna"	6:00
3.	"(Sometimes) Believe in Yourself"	7:18
4.	"Love Fantasy"	6:33
5.	""Sigh" (Feel the Vibration)"	7:25
6.	"Baby Bubba"	6:22

== Personnel ==
- Roy Ayers – lead vocals, electric piano (tracks: 1, 3–6), Quadra synthesizer (track 2), clavinet (track 3), Oberheim synthesizer (track 5), handclaps (track 6), producer
- Dyan Venter – lead vocals (tracks: 1, 2)
- Sylvia Striplin – lead vocals (tracks: 1, 4, 6)
- Wes Ramseur – lead vocals (track 6)
- Chano O'Ferral – lead vocals (track 6)
- Chris Calloway – backing vocals (track 3)
- Cindy Prioleau – backing vocals (track 3)
- Chuck Anthony – guitar (tracks: 1, 3–6)
- Peter Brown – bass (tracks: 1, 2, 4–6)
- William Henry Allen – bass (track 3), arrangement
- Omar Hakim – drums (tracks: 1, 4–6)
- Quentin Dennard – drums (track 2)
- Bernard Lee "Pretty" Purdie – drums (track 3)

Technical

- David Wittman – engineering
- Carla Bandini – engineering
- Greg Calbi – mastering
- Judy Weinstein – liner notes

== Charts ==
Chart (1980)	Peak position
US Billboard 200	157
US Top R&B/Hip-Hop Albums (Billboard)	47
