= Vibrations (Roy Ayers album) =

Studio album by Roy Ayers Ubiquity
- Released: 1976
- Recorded: 1976
- Studio: Electric Lady (New York); Paragon (Chicago); Larabee (Los Angeles)
- Genre: Jazz-funk
- Length: 41:48
- Label: Polydor
- Producer: Roy Ayers

Roy Ayers Ubiquity chronology
| Everybody Loves the Sunshine (1976) | Vibrations (1976) | Lifeline (1977) |

Professional ratings
Review scores
| Source | Rating |
|---|---|
| AllMusic | 4/5 stars |

Vibrations is a studio album by Roy Ayers Ubiquity. It was recorded at Electric Lady in New York, Paragon in Chicago and Larabee in Los Angeles, and released in late 1976 through Polydor Records. Production was handled by Ayers himself with co-producers Edwin Birdsong, James Green and William Allen, and Maurice Green serving as associate producer.

The album peaked at number 74 on the Billboard 200 and number 11 on the Top R&B/Hip-Hop Albums charts in the United States.

== Track listing ==
| No. | Title | Writer(s) | Length |
|---|---|---|---|
| 1. | "Domelo (Give It to Me)" | Roy Ayers; Edwin Birdsong | 4:00 |
| 2. | "Baby I Need Your Love" | Ayers | 2:31 |
| 3. | "Higher" | Ayers | 4:02 |
| 4. | "The Memory" | Ayers; Birdsong; William Allen | 4:32 |
| 5. | "Come out and Play" | Ayers; Birdsong; Allen | 3:46 |
| 6. | "Better Days" | Ayers | 3:19 |
| 7. | "Searching" | Ayers | 4:00 |
| 8. | "One Sweet Love to Remember" | Ayers; Allen | 3:58 |
| 9. | "Vibrations" | Ayers | 3:02 |
| 10. | "Moving Grooving" | Ayers | 4:30 |
| 11. | "Baby You Gave Me a Feeling" | Ayers; Birdsong | 3:02 |
| Total length: | | | 41:48 |

== Personnel ==
- Roy Ayers – vocals, Deagan vibraharp, piano, electric piano, synthesizer, percussion, producer, arranger
- Edwin Birdsong – vocals, synthesizer, co-producer, arranger
- Deborah "Chicas" Darby – vocals
- Janice Fletcher – backing vocals
- Philip Woo – piano, electric piano, synthesizers (ARP, Minimoog), harmonica
- Greg Phillinganes – electric piano, synthesizer
- Calvin Banks – guitar
- Chuck Anthony – guitar
- Ronald "Head" Drayton – guitar
- William Henry Allen – bass, co-producer, arranger
- Byron Miller – bass
- Steve Cobb – drums
- Dennis Davis – drums
- Bernard Purdie – drums
- Marvin Sparks – drums
- Ricky Lawson – drums
- Chano O'Ferral – congas, percussion
- Justo Almario – tenor saxophone
- John Mosley – trumpet
- Lew Soloff – trumpet
- James Green – co-producer, engineering
- Maurice Green – associate producer
- Jerry Solomon – engineering assistant
- Beverly Parker – art direction
- Jan Michael – photography

== Charts ==
| Chart (1977) | Peak position |
|---|---|
| US Billboard 200 | 74 |
| US Top R&B/Hip-Hop Albums (Billboard) | 11 |
