= No Stranger to Love =

1979 studio album by Roy Ayers

Studio album by Roy Ayers
- Released: November 1979
- Studios: Automated, New York City; Kendun, Burbank, California; Sigma, New York City
- Genres: Jazz fusion; soul jazz
- Length: 42:06
- Label: Polydor
- Producers: Roy Ayers; William Allen

Roy Ayers chronology
Fever (1979)	No Stranger to Love (1979)	Love Fantasy (1980)

Singles from No Stranger to Love
- 1. "Don't Stop the Feeling" Released: 1979; 2. "What You Won't Do For Love" Released: 1979

Professional ratings
Review scores
Source	Rating
AllMusic	3/5 stars
The Encyclopedia of Popular Music	2/5 stars

No Stranger to Love is a studio album by American musician Roy Ayers. It was released in November 1979 through Polydor Records. The recording sessions for the album took place at Automated Sound Studios and Sigma Sound Studios in New York City, and at Kendun Recorders in Burbank, California. The album was produced by William Allen and Ayers.

The album peaked at number 82 on the Billboard 200 albums chart and at number 22 on the Top R&B/Hip-Hop Albums chart in the United States. Both of its singles, "Don't Stop the Feeling" and "What You Won't Do for Love", peaked at numbers 32 and 73, respectively, on the Hot R&B/Hip-Hop Songs chart.

== Track listing ==
No.	Title	Writer(s)	Length
1.	"Don't Stop the Feeling"	Roy Ayers; Chano O'Ferral; Wes Ramseur	8:14
2.	"What You Won't Do for Love"	Bobby Caldwell	5:50
3.	"Shack Up, Pack Up, It's Up (When I'm Gone)"	Roy Ayers; Argerie Ayers	6:03
4.	"Slyde"	Roy Ayers	5:31
5.	"No Stranger to Love / Want You"	Roy Ayers; William Allen	7:07
6.	"Don't Let Our Love Slip Away"	William Allen	5:44
7.	"Don't Hide Your Love"	Roy Ayers; William Allen	3:37

== Charts ==
Chart (1980)	Peak position
US Billboard 200	82
US Top R&B/Hip-Hop Albums (Billboard)	22
