= Let's Do It (album) =

1978 studio album by Roy Ayers

Studio album by Roy Ayers
- Released: 1978
- Studios: Electric Lady, New York City; Sigma Sound, New York City; Record Plant, Los Angeles, California
- Genres: Jazz-funk; soul jazz
- Label: Polydor
- Producers: Roy Ayers; William Allen

Roy Ayers chronology
Lifeline (1977)	Let's Do It (1978)	Step Into Our Life (1978)

Singles from Let's Do It
- 1. "Freaky Deaky" Released: 1978; 2. "Let's Do It" Released: 1978

Professional ratings
Review scores
Source	Rating
AllMusic	2/5 stars
The Encyclopedia of Popular Music	2/5 stars

Let's Do It is a studio album by American musician Roy Ayers. It was released in 1978 through Polydor Records. The recording sessions took place at Sigma Sound Studios and Electric Lady Studios in New York City, and at Record Plant in Los Angeles. The album was produced by Ayers and William Allen. It features contributions from Merry Clayton, Sylvia Cox and Debbie Burrell on vocals, Harry Whitaker, Armen Donelian and Philip Woo on piano, Greg Moore on guitar, Kerry Turman on bass, Bernard Purdie on drums, Chano O'Ferral on congas, Justo Almario on saxophone, and John Mosley on trumpet.

The album peaked at number 33 on the Billboard 200 and at number 15 on the Top R&B/Hip-Hop Albums chart. It spawned two 7-inch singles: "Freaky Deaky" and "Let's Do It". "Freaky Deaky" reached peak position number 29 on the Hot R&B/Hip-Hop Songs chart.

== Track listing ==
No.	Title	Writer(s)	Length
1.	"Let's Do It"	Roy Ayers; William Allen	5:33
2.	"Melody Maker"	Allen	4:59
3.	"When Is Real Real?"	Roy Ayers; Maureen Kinnard	8:04
4.	"Sweet Tears"	Roy Ayers; Roselle Weaver	6:27
5.	"You Came into My Life" (featuring Merry Clayton & Sylvia Cox)	Roy Ayers; Argerie Ayers	4:06
6.	"Freaky Deaky" (featuring Merry Clayton & Sylvia Cox)	Roy Ayers; Edwin Birdsong	5:30
7.	"Kiss"	Roy Ayers	4:22

== Personnel ==
- Roy Ayers – lead vocals, arrangement (tracks: 1, 3–7), producer
- Merry Clayton – lead vocals (tracks: 5, 6), backing vocals
- Sylvia Cox – lead vocals (tracks: 5, 6), backing vocals
- Debbie Burrell – backing vocals
- William Henry Allen – bass, arrangement, co-producer
- Harry Lamah Whitaker – piano
- Armen Donelian – piano
- Philip Woo – piano
- Gregory David Moore – guitar
- Kerry Turman – bass
- Bernard Lee "Pretty" Purdie – drums
- Chano O'Ferral – congas
- Justo Almario – tenor saxophone
- John Clifford Mosley Jr. – trumpet

Technical

- Michael Hutchinson – engineering & mixing
- Bruce Hensal – engineering
- Jerry Solomon – engineering
- J.D. Stewart – assistant engineering

== Chart history ==
Chart (1978)	Peak position
US Billboard 200	33
US Top R&B/Hip-Hop Albums (Billboard)	15
