= Meet Her at the Love Parade =

1997 single by Da Hool

Single by Da Hool

from the album Here Comes Da Hool
- Released: 4 August 1997
- Length: 9:30 (original mix); 3:27 (radio edit)
- Label: Kosmo
- Songwriter: Da Hool
- Producer: Da Hool

Da Hool singles chronology
"I Want You" (1996)	"Meet Her at the Love Parade" (1997)	"Bora Bora" (1997)

"Meet Her at the Love Parade" is a song recorded by German disc jockey Da Hool. It was released in August 1997 by the Kosmo label as the lead single from his debut studio album, Here Comes Da Hool (1997). The song references the Love Parade, a former German electronic dance music festival and parade, and had great success in many countries, particularly in Belgium, France, Germany, Ireland, and the Netherlands, where it reached the top 10. In Iceland, the song peaked at number one. It was released in the United Kingdom in February 1998 as the Nalin & Kane remix and reached number 15 on the UK Singles Chart. A second remix by Fergie reached number 11 on the same chart in July 2001. British clubbing magazine Mixmag included the song on their list of "The 15 Best Mid-90s Trance Tracks" in 2018.

== Critical reception ==
British magazine Music Week gave the song four out of five, concluding that "Frank Tomiczek's synth-driven instrumental, effectively remixed by Nalin & Kane, will appeal to house and trance fans." Chris Finan from Record Mirror Dance Update rated "Meet Her at the Love Parade" five out of five, writing, "This German track is already well established on various imports in its Nalin & Kane versions which stand out for the simplicity of the looped synth stabs."

== Music video ==
Nikolas Mann directed the music video for the song, which premiered in mid-1997. The music video Stéphane Sednaoui directed for Björk's 1993 single "Big Time Sensuality" heavily influenced the video.

== Charts ==
=== Weekly charts ===
Original version

Chart (1997–1998)	Peak position
Australia (ARIA)	21
Austria (Ö3 Austria Top 40)	23
Belgium (Ultratop 50 Flanders)	18
Belgium (Ultratop 50 Wallonia)	9
Belgium Dance (Ultratop Flanders)	1
Europe (Eurochart Hot 100)	14
France (SNEP)	4
Germany (GfK)	4
Greece (IFPI)	10
Iceland (Íslenski Listinn Topp 40)	1
Ireland (IRMA)	7
Netherlands (Dutch Top 40)	9
Netherlands (Single Top 100)	11
Scottish Singles Sales (Official Charts)	14
Switzerland (Schweizer Hitparade)	17
UK Singles (Official Charts)	15
UK Dance (Official Charts)	1
US Dance Club Play (Billboard)	30

2001 remix

Chart (2001)	Peak position
Germany (GfK)	67
Ireland (IRMA)	20
Ireland Dance (IRMA)	3
Scottish Singles Sales (Official Charts)	10
UK Singles (Official Charts)	11
UK Dance (Official Charts)	1

=== Year-end charts ===
Original version

Chart (1997)	Position
France (SNEP)	73
Germany (Media Control)	51
Netherlands (Single Top 100)	78

Chart (1998)	Position
Belgium (Ultratop 50 Wallonia)	44
Europe (Eurochart Hot 100)	86
France (SNEP)	46
Iceland (Íslenski Listinn Topp 40)	36

== Certifications and sales ==
Region	Certification	Certified units/sales
Australia (ARIA)	Gold	35,000^{^}
Belgium (BRMA)	Gold	25,000^{*}
France (SNEP)	Gold	400,000
United Kingdom (BPI)	Silver	200,000^{‡}
^{*} Sales figures based on certification alone.^{^} Shipments figures based on certification alone.^{‡} Sales+streaming figures based on certification alone.

== Release history ==
Region	Version	Date	Format(s)	Label(s)	Ref.
Europe	Original	4 August 1997	CD	Kosmo	
United Kingdom	Original	2 February 1998	12-inch vinyl; CD	Manifesto	
United Kingdom	2001 remix	16 July 2001	12-inch vinyl; CD	Manifesto	
