= Feeling Good (Roy Ayers album) =

1982 studio album by Roy Ayers

Studio album by Roy Ayers
- Released: 1982
- Studio: Electric Lady, New York City; Sigma Sound, New York City
- Genre: Soul jazz
- Label: Polydor
- Producer: Roy Ayers; Vesta Maxey; Roy Ayers III

Roy Ayers chronology
Africa, Center of the World (1981)	Feeling Good (1982)	Lots of Love (1983)

Singles from Feeling Good
- 1. "Turn Me Loose" Released: 1982; 2. "Let's Stay Together" Released: 1982; 3. "Fire Up the Funk" Released: 1982

Professional ratings
Review scores
Source	Rating
AllMusic	2/5 stars

Feeling Good is a studio album by American musician Roy Ayers. It was released in 1982 through Polydor Records, making it his last album for the label. The recording sessions for the album took place at Electric Lady Studios and Sigma Sound Studios in New York City.

== Track listing ==
No.	Title	Writer(s)	Length
1.	"Fire Up the Funk"	Roy Ayers; Vesta Maxey; Roy Ayers III	5:27
2.	"Let's Stay Together"	Terri Wells; James King; John King	5:20
3.	"Ooh"	Roy Ayers	4:16
4.	"Our Time Is Coming"	Roy Ayers	5:36
5.	"Turn Me Loose"	Roy Ayers	5:50
6.	"Knock, Knock"	Roy Ayers; Vesta Maxey	4:54
7.	"Stairway to the Stars"	Matty Malneck; Mitchell Parish; Frank Signorelli	5:03
8.	"Feeling Good"	Roy Ayers; Peter Brown	4:27

== Charts ==
Chart (1982)	Peak position
US Billboard 200	160
US Top R&B/Hip-Hop Albums (Billboard)	45
