= I Wish (Joel Corry song) =

2021 single by Joel Corry featuring Mabel

Single by Joel Corry featuring Mabel

from the album Another Friday Night and About Last Night… (digital and streaming edition)
- Released: 29 October 2021
- Genre: House
- Length: 3:01
- Label: Atlantic; Warner
- Songwriters: Uzoechi Emenike; Aminata Kabba; Harlee Jayne; Sudworth; Jess Glynne; Joel Corry; Lewis Thompson; Mabel McVey; Neave Applebaum; Paul Harris; Poppy Baskcomb; Robert Harvey
- Producers: Joel Corry; Lewis Thompson; Neave Applebaum

Joel Corry singles chronology
"Out Out" (2021)	"I Wish" (2021)	"Liquor Store" (2022)

Mabel singles chronology
"Take It Home" (2021)	"I Wish" (2021)	"Time After Time" (2021)

Music video
- "I Wish" on YouTube

"I Wish" is a song by English DJ Joel Corry featuring English singer Mabel, released on 29 October 2021. The song peaked at number 17 on the UK Singles Chart, became Joel Corry's sixth and Mabel's eleventh top-20 hit. "I Wish" is also featured as a bonus track on the streaming edition of Mabel's second studio album About Last Night… (2022).

== Track listing ==
Digital download and streaming
No.	Title	Length
1.	"I Wish"	3:01

Digital download and streaming – Christmas version
No.	Title	Length
1.	"I Wish" (Christmas version)	3:20

Digital download and streaming – VIP mix
No.	Title	Length
1.	"I Wish" (VIP mix)	2:55

Digital download and streaming – Westend remix
No.	Title	Length
1.	"I Wish" (Westend remix)	2:58

Digital download and streaming – Dopamine remix
No.	Title	Length
1.	"I Wish" (Dopamine remix)	3:39

Digital download and streaming – Felix Jaehn remix
No.	Title	Length
1.	"I Wish" (Felix Jaehn remix)	2:37

Digital download and streaming – Ben Rainey remix
No.	Title	Length
1.	"I Wish" (Ben Rainey remix)	3:02

Digital download and streaming – Ayo Beatz remix (featuring SwitchOTR, Hardy Caprio, Ms Banks, ZieZie and Mabel)
No.	Title	Length
1.	"I Wish" (Ayo Beatz remix)	3:08

== Charts ==
=== Weekly charts ===
Weekly chart performance for "I Wish"
Chart (2021–2023)	Peak position
Czech Republic Airplay (ČNS IFPI)	34
Hungary (Dance Top 40)	34
Ireland (IRMA)	16
Netherlands (Dutch Top 40)	33
New Zealand Hot Singles (RMNZ)	22
Poland (Polish Airplay Top 100)	15
Slovakia Airplay (ČNS IFPI)	43
UK Singles (OCC)	17
UK Dance (OCC)	2
US Hot Dance/Electronic Songs (Billboard)	22

=== Year-end charts ===
2022 year-end chart performance for "I Wish"
Chart (2022)	Position
US Hot Dance/Electronic Songs (Billboard)	81

== Certifications ==
Certifications for "I Wish"
Region	Certification	Certified units/sales
United Kingdom (BPI)	Platinum	600,000^{‡}
^{‡} Sales+streaming figures based on certification alone.
