= Africa, Center of the World =

1981 studio album by Roy Ayers

Studio album by Roy Ayers
- Released: 1981
- Studio: Artisian Sound, Hollywood, California; Sigma Sound, New York City
- Genre: Jazz-funk
- Label: Polydor
- Producer: Roy Ayers; William Allen; James Bedford

Roy Ayers chronology
Music of Many Colors (1980)	Africa, Center of the World (1981)	Feeling Good (1982)

Singles from Africa, Center of the World
- 1. "Destination Motherland" Released: 1981

Professional ratings
Review scores
Source	Rating
AllMusic	3.5/5 stars

Africa, Center of the World is a studio album by American musician Roy Ayers. It was released in 1981 through Polydor Records. The recording sessions for the album took place at Artisian Sound Recording Studio in Hollywood, California and Sigma Sound Studios in New York City. The album is dedicated to Fela Kuti and Bob Marley.

== Track listing ==
No.	Title	Writer(s)	Length
1.	"Africa, Center of the World"	Fela Anikupalo Kuti	5:26
2.	"Intro/The River Niger"	Roy Ayers	5:23
3.	"I'll Just Keep Trying"	Roy Ayers; James Bedford	6:02
4.	"Destination Motherland"	Roy Ayers; Luther Wilson; Tanya Woods	4:53
5.	"The Third Eye"	Roy Ayers	4:49
6.	"Intro/Land of Fruit and Honey"	Roy Ayers	5:24
7.	"Intro/Mo Nise Si E (I Love You)"	Luther Wilson; Tanya Woods	7:07
8.	"There's a Master Plan"	Roy Ayers; James Bedford; William Allen	3:45

== Personnel ==
- Roy Ayers - lead vocals, vibraphone, electric piano, Clavinet, marimba, bass marimba, handclaps
- Carla Vaughn, Marva Hicks, Sylvia Striplin, Terri Wells - lead vocals
- James "Jaymz" Bedford - lead and backing vocals, Clavinet, ARP synthesizer, cowbell, handclaps
- Jeffery Quiton - guitar
- Chuck Anthony - guitar, handclaps
- Peter Brown - bass
- Harold Land, Jr., Lesette Wilson - electric piano
- Omar Hakim, Quentin Dennard, Steve Cobb - drums
- Dom Um Romão - percussion
- Weldon Arthur McDougal III - quica drums
- William Allen - bass marimba, bells, shekere, handclaps
- Dennis "Gorilla" Armstead - glass harmonica
- Debbe Cole, Ethel Beatty, Sylvia Striplin - backing vocals
- Jojo Lole Dawodu, Omo Yeni Anikulapo-Kuti - speaking voices
- Erlean Perry - voice narration on "Africa, Center of the World"
- William Allen - "father" voice on "Intro/The River Niger"
- Miles Bailer Armstead - "little boy" voice on "Intro/The River Niger"

== Charts ==
Chart (1981)	Peak position
US Billboard 200	197
US Top R&B/Hip-Hop Albums (Billboard)	43
