= Lifeline (Roy Ayers album) =

1977 album by Roy Ayers Ubiquity

Studio album by Roy Ayers
- Released: 1977
- Studio: Electric Lady, New York City; Sigma Sound, New York City; Record Plant, Los Angeles
- Genre: Jazz-funk; soul jazz
- Label: Polydor
- Producer: Roy Ayers; William Allen; Edwin Birdsong

Roy Ayers chronology
Everybody Loves the Sunshine (1976)	Lifeline (1977)	Let's Do It (1978)

Singles from Lifeline
- 1. "Running Away" Released: 1977

Lifeline is a studio album by Roy Ayers Ubiquity. It was released in 1977 through Polydor Records. The recording sessions for the album took place at Sigma Sound Studios and Electric Lady Studios in New York City, and at Record Plant in Los Angeles. The album was produced by Ayers, Edwin Birdsong, and William Allen. It features contributions from singers Dee Dee Bridgewater and Sylvia Cox, keyboardist Philip Woo, guitarists Calvin Banks, Chuck Anthony, Glenn Jeffrey and James Mason, drummer Steve Cobb, percussionist Chano O'Ferral, saxophonist Justo Almario, and trumpeter John Mosley.

The album peaked at number 72 on the Billboard 200 albums chart and at number 9 on the Top R&B/Hip-Hop Albums chart in the United States. Its lead single, "Running Away", reached peak position No. 19 on the Hot R&B/Hip-Hop Songs chart.

== Critical reception ==
Professional ratings
Review scores
Source	Rating
AllMusic	3/5 stars

The Bay State Banner wrote: "Nearly every song parodies a popular soul act. Some even verge on insult—all in fun, of course—and thus Natalie Cole's Aretha-isms, Earth Wind and Fire's sometimes humorless pep-talks, and the Isley Brothers' conservative rock 'n rhythm (in 'Cincinnati Growl') all get their turn for musical pie-in-the-face."

== Track listing ==
No.	Title	Writer(s)	Length
1.	"This Side of Sunshine"	William Allen	3:16
2.	"Running Away"	Roy Ayers; Edwin Birdsong	3:55
3.	"Gotta Find a Lover"	Roy Ayers; Edwin Birdsong	7:10
4.	"I Still Love You"	Roy Ayers	4:09
5.	"Lifeline"	Roy Ayers	2:50
6.	"Cincinnati Growl"	Roy Ayers	3:54
7.	"Fruit"	Roy Ayers; Carl Clay	3:53
8.	"Sanctified Feeling"	Edwin Birdsong	5:42
9.	"Stranded in the Jungle"	Roy Ayers	4:30
10.	"Together"	Roy Ayers	3:39

== Personnel ==
Roy Ayers Ubiquity

- Roy Ayers – vocals, vibraphone, electric piano, Deagan vibraharp, arrangement (tracks: 2–7, 9–10), producer
- Edwin L. Birdsong – vocals, piano, arrangement (track 8), co-producer
- William Henry Allen – bass, arrangement (track 1), co-producer
- Dee Dee Bridgewater – vocals
- Sylvia Cox – vocals
- Philip Woo – Moog synthesizer, ARP String Synthesizer, electric piano, piano
- Chuck Anthony – guitar
- Calvin Banks – guitar
- Glenn S. Jeffrey – guitar
- James Philip Mason – guitar
- Kwame Steve Cobb – drums
- Chano O'Ferral – congas, percussion
- Justo Almario – tenor saxophone
- John Clifford Mosley, Jr. – trumpet

Technical

- Michael Hutchinson – engineering
- David Wittman – engineering
- Bruce Hensal – engineering
- Jerry Solomon – engineering
- James Patrick Green – engineering
- Basil Pao Ho-Yun – art direction
- Kathie McKinty – photography

== Chart history ==
Chart (1977)	Peak position
US Billboard 200	72
US Top R&B/Hip-Hop Albums (Billboard)	9
