= Daddy Bug =

Studio album by Roy Ayers
- Released: 1969
- Recorded: March 11, May 12, July 21 and August 13, 1969
- Studio: Atlantic and A & R Recording, New York City
- Genre: Jazz
- Label: Atlantic; SD 1538
- Producer: Herbie Mann

Roy Ayers chronology
Stoned Soul Picnic (1968)	Daddy Bug (1969)	Ubiquity (1971)

Daddy Bug is an album by American jazz vibraphonist Roy Ayers, released on the Atlantic label in 1969. Several tracks from the album were re-released without string and woodwind overdubs on Daddy Bug & Friends in 1976.

== Track listing ==
1. "Daddy Bug" (Roy Ayers) - 3:08
2. "Bonita" (Antônio Carlos Jobim, Ray Gilbert) - 2:51
3. "This Guy's in Love with You" (Burt Bacharach, Hal David) - 4:49
4. "I Love You Michelle" (Edwin Birdsong) - 4:50
5. "Shadows" (Buster Williams) - 3:43
6. "Emmie" (Laura Nyro) - 4:14
7. "Look to the Sky" (Jobim) - 4:56
8. "It Could Only Happen with You" (Jobim, Gilbert, Louis Oliveira) - 2:53

Recorded at Atlantic Studios and A & R Studios in NYC on March 11, 1969 (tracks 3, 4 & 7), May 12, 1969 (tracks 1, 2, 5 & 8), and August 13, 1969 (track 6), with overdubbed woodwinds and strings recorded on July 21, 1969 (tracks 1, 3–5, 7 & 8)

== Personnel ==
- Roy Ayers - vibraphone
- Herbie Hancock - piano
- Sonny Sharrock - guitar (track 6)
- Ron Carter (tracks 3, 4, 6 & 7), Buster Williams (tracks 1, 2, 5 & 8) - bass
- Bruno Carr (track 6), Freddie Waits (tracks 3, 4 & 7), Mickey Roker (tracks 1, 2, 5 & 8) - drums
- Hubert Laws - flute, bass flute (tracks 1, 3–5 & 7)
- George Marge, Romeo Penque, Jerome Richardson - soprano saxophone, bass clarinet (tracks 1, 3–5 & 7)
- Bill Fischer - arranger, conductor (tracks 1–5, 7 & 8)
- Alfred Brown, Kermit Moore, George Ricci - cello (tracks 1, 5 & 8)
- Gene Orloff - string director (tracks 1, 5 & 8)

== Charts ==
Chart performance for Daddy Bug
Chart (2026)	Peak position
UK Jazz & Blues Albums (OCC)	14
US Top Contemporary Jazz Albums (Billboard)	8
