= Vibrate (disambiguation) =

Vibrate refers to the act of vibration. Vibrate may also refer to:

- Vibrate (The Manhattan Transfer album), a 2004 album by The Manhattan Transfer
- Vibrate: The Best of Rufus Wainwright, a 2014 album by Rufus Wainwright
- "Vibrate", a song by Outkast from their 2003 album, Speakerboxxx/The Love Below
- "Vibrate", a song by Rufus Wainwright from his 2003 album, Want One
- "Vibrate", a song by Petey Pablo from his 2004 album, Still Writing in My Diary: 2nd Entry
- "Vibrate", a song by English DJ Tazer released in 2016 as a single
- "Vibrate", a song by Tyga featuring Swae Lee from his 2019 album, Legendary
- "Psilocybae (Millennial Love)", a song by Childish Gambino originally titled "Vibrate"

== See also ==
- Vibrating (album), a 2022 studio album by American rock band Collective Soul
