= Stoned Soul Picnic (Roy Ayers album) =

Studio album by Roy Ayers
- Released: 1968
- Recorded: June 20, 1968
- Studio: NYC
- Genre: Jazz
- Length: 38:17
- Label: Atlantic; SD 1514
- Producer: Herbie Mann

Roy Ayers chronology
Virgo Vibes (1967)	Stoned Soul Picnic (1968)	Daddy Bug (1969)

Stoned Soul Picnic is the third studio album by American jazz vibraphonist Roy Ayers, released in 1968 by Atlantic Records.

== Critical reception ==
Professional ratings
Review scores
Source	Rating
AllMusic	3/5 stars

AllMusic noted "the group keeps the groove percolating nicely throughout, making Stoned Soul Picnic one of Ayers' better jazz-oriented outings".

== Track listing ==
1. "A Rose for Cindy" (Roy Ayers) — 8:56
2. "Stoned Soul Picnic" (Laura Nyro) — 2:50
3. "Wave" (Antônio Carlos Jobim) — 7:59
4. "For Once in My Life" (Ron Miller, Orlando Murden) — 3:50
5. "Lil's Paradise" (Charles Tolliver) — 6:33
6. "What the People Say" (Edwin Birdsong) — 8:09

== Personnel ==
- Roy Ayers — vibraphone
- Charles Tolliver — trumpet, flugelhorn
- Hubert Laws — flute, piccolo
- Gary Bartz — alto saxophone
- Herbie Hancock — piano
- Ron Carter (tracks 1 & 2), Miroslav Vitouš (tracks 3–6) — bass
- Grady Tate — drums
- Herbie Mann — producer
