= Virgo Vibes =

Studio album by Roy Ayers
- Released: 1967
- Recorded: January 18 and March 6, 1967
- Studio: Gold Star (Los Angeles, CA and NYC)
- Genre: Jazz
- Length: 40:27
- Label: Atlantic; SD 1488
- Producer: Herbie Mann

Roy Ayers chronology
West Coast Vibes (1963)	Virgo Vibes (1967)	Stoned Soul Picnic (1968)

Virgo Vibes is the second studio album by American jazz vibraphonist Roy Ayers, released in 1967 by Atlantic Records.

== Critical reception ==
Professional ratings
Review scores
Source	Rating
AllMusic	4/5 stars

AllMusic noted, "Long before he switched to playing disco and pop music, Roy Ayers was considered a promising young jazz vibraphonist. This LP, his second as a leader, was one of his finest".

== Track listing ==
All compositions by Roy Ayers, except where noted

1. "The Ringer" (Charles Tolliver) — 7:36
2. "Ayerloom" (Roy Norman) — 5:19
3. "In the Limelight" (Gerald Wilson) — 6:55
4. "Virgo Vibes" — 12:49
5. "Glow Flower" — 7:48
6. "Mine Royd" — 5:08 Bonus track on CD reissue
7. "Number Seven" — 7:45 Bonus track on CD reissue
- Recorded at Gold Star Studios, in Los Angeles, California, on January 18, 1967 (tracks 4–7), and in New York City on March 6, 1967 (tracks 1–3)

== Personnel ==
- Roy Ayers — vibraphone
- Charles Tolliver — trumpet
- Joe Henderson (tracks 1–3), Harold Land (tracks 4–7) — tenor saxophone
- Ronnie Clark (Herbie Hancock appearing under a pseudonym) (tracks 1–3), Jack Wilson (tracks 4–7) — piano
- Buster Williams (tracks 4–7), Reggie Workman (tracks 1–3) — bass
- Donald Bailey (tracks 4–7), Bruno Carr (tracks 1–3) — drums
