= Bed (Joel Corry, Raye and David Guetta song) =

Single by Joel Corry, Raye and David Guetta

from the album Another Friday Night
- Released: 26 February 2021
- Genre: House
- Length: 2:58
- Label: Perfect Havoc; Asylum UK; Atlantic
- Composers: David Guetta; Joel Corry; Giorgio Tuinfort; Lewis Thompson; Neave Applebaum
- Lyricists: Rachel Keen; Janée "Jin Jin" Bennett
- Producers: Joel Corry; David Guetta; Giorgio Tuinfort; Lewis Thompson; Neave Applebaum

Joel Corry singles chronology
"Head & Heart" (2020)	"Bed" (2021)	"Out Out" (2021)

Raye singles chronology
"Regardless" (2020)	"Bed" (2021)	"Ferrari Horses" (2021)

David Guetta singles chronology
"Floating Through Space" (2021)	"Bed" (2021)	"Hero" (2021)

Music video
- "Bed" on YouTube

"Bed" is a song by British DJ and record producer Joel Corry, British singer-songwriter Raye and French DJ and record producer David Guetta. It was released as a single on 26 February 2021, through Perfect Havoc and Asylum Records UK. The song was written by Corry, Raye, Guetta, Giorgio Tuinfort, Jin Jin, Lewis Thompson and Neave Applebaum. The song was certified platinum by the BPI on 23 July 2021.

== Background ==
In an interview with the Official Charts Company, Corry explained that the creation of the song started in summer 2020 during a studio session with singer-songwriter Janée "Jin Jin" Bennett. After listening to demos recorded by Raye, he proceeded to contact the singer via Instagram, saying "she told me that she wrote the idea with David Guetta. I got in contact with David and he was happy for me to work on it with Raye. Me and Raye hit the studio together and developed the rest of the song. Fast forward eight months and we are ready to release 'Bed' to the world". Prior to the release, Corry revealed, "I've put so much hard work and love into it and I'm so lucky to be able to collaborate with amazing talents like Raye and the legend, David Guetta. I'm just so excited for the world to hear it." The single was announced on 18 February 2021, with each artist posting a picture of themselves lying in bed.

== Composition ==
"Bed" was described as a "piano house" track with a "punchy and upbeat drop". The song sees Raye commanding "attention, delivering the track's flirtatious yet defiant lyrics with a sophistication and sass that only she can".

== Critical reception ==
In her review for Billboard, Krystal Rodriguez wrote, "Catchy and entirely relatable, 'Bed' has summer 2021 written all over it." Ben Beaumont-Thomas of The Guardian found it "no less of an earworm" than Corry's previous single "Head & Heart". He described it as "softer, with gorgeous cosmic-disco detailing" and "a climactic drop that lands with devastating sweetness on the offbeat."

== Live performances ==
Corry, Raye and Guetta performed "Bed" on Ant & Dec's Saturday Night Takeaway on 3 April 2021.

== Track listing ==
- Digital download and streaming
1. "Bed" – 2:58
- Digital download and streaming – Joel Corry VIP Mix
1. "Bed" (Joel Corry VIP Mix) – 2:59
- Digital download and streaming – The Bedtime Mixes
1. "Bed" (Acoustic) – 2:57
2. "Bed" (Chilled Mix) – 3:12
- Digital download and streaming – David Guetta Festival Mix
1. "Bed" (David Guetta Festival Mix) – 3:55
- Digital download and streaming – The Remixes Pt.2
1. "Bed" (Oliver Nelson Remix) – 3:23
2. "Bed" (Roberto Surace Remix) – 3:57
3. "Bed" (That Kind Remix) – 2:41
4. "Bed" (Kream Remix) – 2:50
5. "Bed" (The Stickmen Remix) – 3:13
6. "Bed" (Chloe Wilson Remix) – 3:20
- Digital download and streaming – The Remixes Pt.1
1. "Bed" (WADE Remix) – 3:09
2. "Bed" (Chapter & Verse Remix) – 3:39
3. "Bed" (Kream Remix) – 2:50

== Personnel ==
Credits adapted from Tidal.

- Joel Corry – production, programming
- Raye – lead vocals, backing vocals
- David Guetta – production, programming
- Giorgio Tuinfort – production
- Lewis Thompson – production, engineering, programming
- Neave Applebaum – production, engineering, programming
- Nonô – backing vocals
- Jenna Felsenthal – engineering, vocal production
- Kevin Grainger – mastering, mixing
- Cameron Gower Poole – vocal production

== Charts ==
=== Weekly charts ===
Weekly chart performance for "Bed"
Chart (2021–2024)	Peak position
Australia (ARIA)	20
Austria (Ö3 Austria Top 40)	48
Belarus Airplay (TopHit)	170
Belgium (Ultratop 50 Flanders)	9
Belgium (Ultratop 50 Wallonia)	26
Canada Hot 100 (Billboard)	100
CIS Airplay (TopHit)	4
Croatia International Airplay (Top lista)	3
Czech Republic Airplay (ČNS IFPI)	2
Czech Republic Singles Digital (ČNS IFPI)	34
Denmark (Tracklisten)	40
Estonia Airplay (TopHit)	152
France (SNEP)	137
Germany (GfK)	34
Global 200 (Billboard)	48
Greece International Streaming (IFPI)	22
Hungary (Dance Top 40)	5
Hungary (Rádiós Top 40)	6
Hungary (Single Top 40)	33
Hungary (Stream Top 40)	22
Iceland (Tónlistinn)	24
Ireland (IRMA)	3
Italy (FIMI)	35
Kazakhstan Airplay (TopHit)	58
Lebanon (Lebanese Top 20)	15
Lithuania (AGATA)	18
Lithuania Airplay (TopHit)	98
Netherlands (Dutch Top 40)	4
Netherlands (Single Top 100)	7
New Zealand Hot Singles (RMNZ)	6
Norway (VG-lista)	40
Poland Airplay (ZPAV)	71
Portugal (AFP)	88
Romania (Airplay 100)	18
Russia Airplay (TopHit)	1
San Marino Airplay (SMRTV Top 50)	3
Slovakia Airplay (ČNS IFPI)	8
Slovakia Singles Digital (ČNS IFPI)	29
Slovenia Airplay (SloTop50)	27
Sweden (Sverigetopplistan)	76
Switzerland (Schweizer Hitparade)	43
Ukraine Airplay (TopHit)	151
UK Singles (Official Charts)	3
UK Dance (Official Charts)	1
US Hot Dance/Electronic Songs (Billboard)	7

=== Monthly charts ===
Monthly chart performance for "Bed"
Chart (2021–2023)	Peak position
CIS Airplay (TopHit)	5
Czech Republic (Rádio – Top 100)	4
Czech Republic (Singles Digitál Top 100)	38
Kazakhstan Airplay (TopHit)	84
Russia Airplay (TopHit)	1
Slovakia (Rádio – Top 100)	17
Slovakia (Singles Digitál Top 100)	32

=== Year-end charts ===
2021 year-end chart performance for "Bed"
Chart (2021)	Position
Australia (ARIA)	47
Belgium (Ultratop Flanders)	42
Germany (Official German Charts)	74
CIS Airplay (TopHit)	12
Global 200 (Billboard)	161
Hungary (Dance Top 40)	51
Hungary (Rádiós Top 40)	46
Hungary (Stream Top 40)	49
Ireland (IRMA)	10
Netherlands (Dutch Top 40)	7
Netherlands (Single Top 100)	29
Russia Airplay (TopHit)	15
Switzerland (Schweizer Hitparade)	77
UK Singles (OCC)	18
US Hot Dance/Electronic Songs (Billboard)	14

2022 year-end chart performance for "Bed"
Chart (2022)	Position
CIS Airplay (TopHit)	106
Russia Airplay (TopHit)	120

2023 year-end chart performance for "Bed"
Chart (2023)	Position
Kazakhstan Airplay (TopHit)	192

2024 year-end chart performance for "Bed"
Chart (2024)	Position
Lithuania Airplay (TopHit)	96

2025 year-end chart performance for "Bed"
Chart (2025)	Position
Lithuania Airplay (TopHit)	114

== Certifications ==
Certifications for "Bed"
Region	Certification	Certified units/sales
Australia (ARIA)	2× Platinum	140,000^{‡}
Austria (IFPI Austria)	Platinum	30,000^{‡}
Canada (Music Canada)	Platinum	80,000^{‡}
Denmark (IFPI Danmark)	Platinum	90,000^{‡}
France (SNEP)	Gold	100,000^{‡}
Germany (BVMI)	Gold	200,000^{‡}
Italy (FIMI)	Platinum	70,000^{‡}
New Zealand (RMNZ)	Platinum	30,000^{‡}
Poland (ZPAV)	Platinum	50,000^{‡}
Portugal (AFP)	Gold	5,000^{‡}
Spain (Promusicae)	Gold	30,000^{‡}
Switzerland (IFPI Switzerland)	Platinum	20,000^{‡}
United Kingdom (BPI)	2× Platinum	1,200,000^{‡}
^{‡} Sales+streaming figures based on certification alone.

== See also ==
- List of Billboard number-one dance songs of 2021
