= Lonely (Joel Corry song) =

Single by Joel Corry

from the album Another Friday Night
- Released: 24 January 2020
- Genre: House
- Length: 3:10
- Label: Perfect Havoc; Asylum
- Songwriters: Joel Corry; Lewis Thompson; Neave Applebaum; Harlee Jayne Sudworth; Robert Michael Nelson Harvey
- Producers: Joel Corry; Lewis Thompson; Neave Applebaum

Joel Corry singles chronology
"Sorry" (2019)	"Lonely" (2020)	"Head & Heart" (2020)

Music video
- "Lonely" on YouTube

"Lonely" is a song by English DJ and producer Joel Corry. It features uncredited vocals from English singer Harlee. It was released on 24 January 2020. On 20 March 2020, "Lonely" was certified Silver by the British Phonographic Industry, for moving 200,000 units in the UK.

== Music video ==
The music video for the track was released on the 24 January 2020 and stars Aimee Corry, Cris Haris, Harlee and Joel Corry. Joel is a doctor in an institution that treats people obsessed with their smartphones. Directed by Eliot Simpson, who mentioned that the two main influences were the film "The Lobster" and the Black Mirror Episode "Nosedive". The video ends with all "patients" reconnecting with people without their phones and dance all together.

== Track listing ==
Digital download
No.	Title	Length
1.	"Lonely"	3:10

Digital download – The Remixes
No.	Title	Length
1.	"Lonely" (Goodboys Remix)	2:43
2.	"Lonely" (Robbie Doherty Remix)	5:54
3.	"Lonely" (Tobtok Remix)	3:13
4.	"Lonely" (Next Habit Remix)	3:25
5.	"Lonely" (Sammy Porter Remix)	2:56

== Personnel ==
Credits adapted from Tidal.

- Joel Corry – producer, songwriter, keyboards
- Lewis Thompson – producer, songwriter, engineer, keyboards
- Neave Applebaum – producer, songwriter, engineer, keyboards, mixer
- Harlee – songwriter, vocals, additional vocal recording
- Robert Michael Nelson Harvey – songwriter, backing vocals
- Kevin Grainger – masterer, mixer

== Charts ==
=== Weekly charts ===
Chart (2020)	Peak position
Belgium (Ultratip Bubbling Under Wallonia)	18
Ireland (IRMA)	3
Hungary (Rádiós Top 40)	36
Hungary (Dance Top 40)	40
Poland Airplay (ZPAV)	9
Scottish Singles Sales (Official Charts)	5
Slovenia (SloTop50)	10
UK Singles (Official Charts)	4
UK Dance (Official Charts)	1
US Hot Dance/Electronic Songs (Billboard)	23

=== Year-end charts ===
Chart (2020)	Position
Ireland (IRMA)	18
Poland (ZPAV)	75
UK Singles (OCC)	14
US Hot Dance/Electronic Songs (Billboard)	74

== Certifications ==
Region	Certification	Certified units/sales
Canada (Music Canada)	Gold	40,000^{‡}
New Zealand (RMNZ)	Gold	15,000^{‡}
Poland (ZPAV)	Platinum	50,000^{‡}
United Kingdom (BPI)	2× Platinum	1,200,000^{‡}
^{‡} Sales+streaming figures based on certification alone.
