= Tazers =

American punk rock band

The Tazers
- Origin: La Habra, California, U.S.
- Genres: Punk rock
- Years active: 1979–1989 (?)
- Labels: Rave Up Records

The Tazers is an American punk rock band that was formed in 1979 in the city of La Habra, California. The group was a part of the Orange County music scene. The band members included Charlie Glancy on lead guitar and metal trash can, Craig Brisco on drums, Mitch McNally, and Sean Brown on vocals and the guitar.

== Group history ==
Weirdotronix Southern California Punk Gig Diary remembers Tazers in 1982 as "a Fullerton bar band, who had recently made the transition from mainstream rock to punk. They were competent musicians, with lots of performing experience, but their approach to punk was rather cliché and formulaic." The review goes on to say that the group apparently decided on having purple hair, torn clothes and sneering after watching the film Valley Girl. In a later review, Tazers are remembered as "well practiced (and well-equipped) musicians, yet there seemed to be something missing from their act. They lacked a powerful stage presence; they were really more new wave than punk, and their original material sounded too much like covers of other bands' songs."

== Albums ==
In 1982, the group released a 7" vinyl single called Don't Classify Me!, featuring five tracks with titles like "Neo Natal Hospital" and "Microwave Mother." Two years later, the group put forth their self-titled LP in which newcomer to the band, Dave Brown, played lead guitar.

== Popularity/promotion ==
During their peak of popularity, while drawing crowds of 400 to 500 people at shows, the band was promoted by using airtime on southern Californian radio stations such as, KNAC and KROQ-FM. Most of the band's legitimate and paying shows were Ichabod's in Fullerton with bands like Chequered Past, D.I. and 45 Grave. The band played mostly undocumented backyard and house parties, often being paid only in beer and alcohol. Undoubtedly, their most prestigious gig was a slot opening for the heavy metal comedy group, Spinal Tap. The Tazers song "Alcoholic’s Anthem" was featured on the soundtrack to the 1987 film Surf Nazis Must Die, commonly recognized as one of the worst movies of all time.

The group disbanded in the late 1980s, with Glancy and Brisco continuing on to play in a new band called D/Railed. Mitch McNally currently plays bass in the group Mama Hagglin.

== 2000s ==
Following the turn of the century, the Tazers became somewhat of a legend in the Orange County punk scene, and their original records began to routinely sell on eBay for hundreds of dollars. In the early 2000s, Rave Up Records announced that they would be re-releasing Don't Classify Me! on vinyl, with a package including vintage photos and extensive liner notes written by the lead guitarist Charlie Glancy. Around the same time, a CD titled Where Has All the Vinyl Gone?, compiling the bands complete discography of one LP and two EPs was self-released.
