= 0800 Heaven =

Single by Nathan Dawe, Joel Corry and Ella Henderson

from the album Another Friday Night
- Written: Mid-2022
- Released: 9 June 2023
- Length: 2:39
- Label: Warner
- Songwriters: Nathan Dawe; Joel Corry; Ella Henderson; Joe Barbe; Maegan Cottone; William Lansley; John Morgan
- Producers: Joel Corry; Nathan Dawe; Punctual

Nathan Dawe singles chronology
"Oh Baby" (2023)	"0800 Heaven" (2023)	"Heart Still Beating" (2023)

Joel Corry singles chronology
"Dance Around It" (2023)	"0800 Heaven" (2023)	"Desire" (2023)

Ella Henderson singles chronology
"Like I Used To" (2023)	"0800 Heaven" (2023)	"Lifeline" (2023)

Visualiser
- "0800 Heaven" on YouTube

"0800 Heaven" is a song by English DJs Nathan Dawe and Joel Corry and English singer Ella Henderson. The single was released on 9 June 2023 through Warner. "0800 Heaven" peaked at number nine on the UK Singles Chart.

== Background and reception ==
Upon release, Dawe shared his excitement about the release, saying, "I came up with the concept for this song while I was touring last summer". He further shared that he was happy to have managed to bring the "idea to life" with Corry and Henderson. To Henderson, the song constitutes "one of [my] favourite things" she has ever made, with Corry adding that the track is "absolutely amazing". An acoustic version of the song was released on 6 July 2023.

The song was described as giving "instant Ibiza classic vibes". Oscar Yerushalmi of EDM Tunes thought the track was a "tour de force of dancefloor euphoria" that showcases their "versatility and collaborative skills". George Griffiths of Official Charts Company praised Henderson's vocals, stating that her appearance "matches her voice's strength with the soaring, roaring production that backs her". Griffiths predicted the song "to be blasting out wherever the boiling hot sun is shining" over the summer.

== Charts ==
=== Weekly charts ===
Weekly chart performance for "0800 Heaven"
Chart (2023)	Peak position
Belgium (Ultratop 50 Flanders)	21
Czech Republic Airplay (ČNS IFPI)	31
Ireland (IRMA)	13
Lebanon (Lebanese Top 20)	20
Netherlands (Dutch Top 40)	4
Netherlands (Single Top 100)	27
UK Singles (Official Charts)	9
UK Dance (Official Charts)	3
US Dance Airplay (Billboard)	13

=== Year-end charts ===
Year-end chart performance for "0800 Heaven"
Chart (2023)	Position
Belgium (Ultratop 50 Flanders)	73
Netherlands (Dutch Top 40)	22

== Certifications ==
Certifications for "0800 Heaven"
Region	Certification	Certified units/sales
United Kingdom (BPI)	Platinum	600,000^{‡}
^{‡} Sales+streaming figures based on certification alone.
