= Sorry (I Didn't Know) =

1999 song by Monsta Boy

Single by Monsta Boy featuring Denzie
- Released: 25 September 2000
- Recorded: 1999
- Genre: UK garage
- Length: 5:50
- Label: Locked On; XL
- Songwriters: Nicholas Reid; David Edwards; Steve Heyliger
- Producer: David Edwards

Monsta Boy featuring Denzie singles chronology
"Sorry (I Didn't Know)" (2000)	"Baby Can't You See" (2001)

"Sorry (I Didn't Know)" is a song by UK garage duo Monsta Boy featuring Denzie on vocals. It was first released in 1999 on white label, then officially released as a single the following year via Locked On Records and XL Recordings. The song reached number 25 on the UK Singles Chart, and number one on the UK Dance Singles Chart in October 2000.

Capital Xtra included the song in their list of "The Best Old-School Garage Anthems of All Time".

== Charts ==
Chart (2000–01)	Peak position
Europe (Eurochart Hot 100)	98
Scottish Singles Sales (Official Charts)	5
UK Singles (Official Charts)	25
UK Dance (Official Charts)	1
UK Indie (Official Charts)	2

== Certifications ==
Region	Certification	Certified units/sales
United Kingdom (BPI)	Silver	200,000^{‡}
^{‡} Sales+streaming figures based on certification alone.

== Joel Corry version ==
"Sorry"

Single by Joel Corry

from the album Another Friday Night
- Released: 5 April 2019
- Genre: Tropical house
- Length: 3:08
- Label: Perfect Havoc; Asylum
- Songwriters: David Alan Edwards; Dean Josiah Mundle; Nicholas James Reid; Steve Edmond Heyliger
- Producers: Joel Corry; Lewis Thompson

Joel Corry singles chronology
"Fallen" (2018)	"Sorry" (2019)	"Lonely" (2020)

Music video
- "Sorry" on YouTube

"Sorry (I Didn't Know)" was covered by English DJ and producer Joel Corry, retitled "Sorry", and was released on 4 April 2019 through Perfect Havoc and Asylum Records. It features uncredited vocals by Hayley May. The song broke the record for the most Shazamed track in one day, with 41,000 Shazams on 24 July. It further ascended the UK Singles Chart after being featured on British reality TV series Love Island, reaching the top 10 in August 2019.

=== Background ===
Corry stated that he was influenced by UK garage growing up, and that it played a "huge role in [his] development as a DJ and a producer".

=== Commercial performance ===
"Sorry" reached number six on the UK Singles Chart in August 2019.

=== Charts ===
==== Weekly charts ====
Chart (2019–2020)	Peak position
Australia (ARIA)	40
Ireland (IRMA)	3
Mexico Airplay (Billboard)	38
Scottish Singles Sales (Official Charts)	5
Slovakia Airplay (ČNS IFPI)	42
UK Singles (Official Charts)	6
UK Dance (Official Charts)	1
US Hot Dance/Electronic Songs (Billboard)	44

==== Year-end charts ====
Chart (2019)	Position
Ireland (IRMA)	34
UK Singles (Official Charts Company)	41

=== Certifications ===
Region	Certification	Certified units/sales
Australia (ARIA)	Platinum	70,000^{‡}
New Zealand (RMNZ)	Gold	15,000^{‡}
United Kingdom (BPI)	2× Platinum	1,200,000^{‡}
^{‡} Sales+streaming figures based on certification alone.

== Other versions ==
In 2006, Dutch group the Partysquad with RMXCRW and Gio released their version titled "I'm Sorry", from the album De Bazen Van De Club, which also contains samples from the David Howard remix of Monsta Boy's "Sorry (I Didn't Know)". "I'm Sorry" reached No. 14 on the Dutch Single Top 100.

In 2018, the House & Garage Orchestra together with Denzee recorded an orchestral version of the song for the UK garage covers album Garage Classics.
