= Out Out (song) =

2021 single by Joel Corry and Jax Jones featuring Charli XCX and Saweetie

Single by Joel Corry and Jax Jones featuring Charli XCX and Saweetie

from the album Another Friday Night
- Released: 13 August 2021
- Genre: Dance
- Length: 2:43
- Label: Asylum Records UK
- Composers: Charlotte Aitchison; Joel Corry; Neave Applebaum; Holly Fletcher; Timucin Lam; Marques Lellis; Røry; Lewis Thompson; Amber Van Day; Paul van Haver
- Lyricists: Janée Bennett; Diamonté Harper; Taylor Parks; Camille Purcell
- Producers: Jax Jones; Joel Corry; Lewis Thompson; Neave Applebaum

Joel Corry singles chronology
"Bed" (2021)	"Out Out" (2021)	"I Wish" (2021)

Jax Jones singles chronology
"Crystallise" (2021)	"Out Out" (2021)	"Where Did You Go?" (2022)

Charli XCX singles chronology
"Xcxoplex" (2021)	"Out Out" (2021)	"Good Ones" (2021)

Saweetie singles chronology
"Hit It" (2021)	"Out Out" (2021)	"Faking Love" (2021)

Music video
- "Out Out" on YouTube

"Out Out" is a song by British DJs Joel Corry and Jax Jones, featuring British singer Charli XCX and American rapper Saweetie performing vocals. The single was released on 13 August 2021 by Asylum Records UK, and later included on Corry's debut studio album, Another Friday Night (2023). "Out Out" peaked at number six on the UK Singles Chart.

== Background and composition ==
"Out Out" samples "Alors on danse" by Belgian musician Stromae. In a statement, Joel Corry called himself a "huge fan" of "Alors on danse", saying he wanted to "put a fun spin on it for summer 2021". Jax Jones said that he was "a big fan of Charli and Saweetie, having them on the song makes it feel like a moment with real synergy". A remix featuring English singer Caro Caxi was later released.

== Critical reception ==
Althea Legaspi of Rolling Stone stated that "Out Out" was a "bumping new track", where "Charli XCX and Saweetie beckon all to hit the dancefloor". NME writer Greta Brereton labeled the single an "up-tempo dance track". In Complex, Jordan Rose said that the track was "a spectacular combination of all four unique skillsets" on the song, deeming it "made for the streets". Rose specifically praised Saweetie's feature, writing that "despite the song lacking any real core rap elements, Saweetie is still able to flow over the EDM beat".

== Credits and personnel ==
- Joel Corry – production, programming, songwriting
- Jax Jones – production, programming, songwriting
- Charli XCX – vocals, songwriting
- Saweetie – vocals, songwriting
- Neave Applebaum – production, engineering, programming, songwriting
- Lewis Thompson – production, engineer, programming, songwriting
- Kevin Grainger – mastering, mixing
- Janée Bennett – songwriting
- Camille Purcell – songwriting
- Holly Fletcher – songwriting
- Taylor Parks – songwriting

== Charts ==
=== Weekly charts ===
Weekly chart performance for "Out Out"
Chart (2021–2022)	Peak position
Australia (ARIA)	31
Austria (Ö3 Austria Top 40)	35
Belgium (Ultratop 50 Wallonia)	17
Canada Hot 100 (Billboard)	69
Canada CHR/Top 40 (Billboard)	40
CIS Airplay (TopHit)	35
Croatia (HRT)	31
Czech Republic Airplay (ČNS IFPI)	38
Czech Republic Singles Digital (ČNS IFPI)	45
Denmark (Tracklisten)	26
Euro Digital Song Sales (Billboard)	7
France (SNEP)	109
Germany (GfK)	20
Global 200 (Billboard)	52
Greece (IFPI)	35
Hungary (Dance Top 40)	36
Hungary (Rádiós Top 40)	13
Hungary (Stream Top 40)	33
Ireland (IRMA)	2
Italy (FIMI)	92
Lithuania (AGATA)	34
Netherlands (Dutch Top 40)	24
Netherlands (Single Top 100)	20
New Zealand Hot Singles (RMNZ)	27
Poland Airplay (ZPAV)	7
Portugal (AFP)	86
Romania (Airplay 100)	36
Romania (Radiomonitor)	19
Russia Airplay (TopHit)	48
Slovakia Airplay (ČNS IFPI)	17
Slovakia Singles Digital (ČNS IFPI)	33
Sweden (Sverigetopplistan)	88
Switzerland (Schweizer Hitparade)	32
UK Singles (Official Charts)	6
UK Dance (Official Charts)	1
Ukraine Airplay (TopHit)	99
US Hot Dance/Electronic Songs (Billboard)	9

=== Year-end charts ===
2021 year-end chart performance for "Out Out"
Chart (2021)	Position
Belgium (Ultratop Wallonia)	100
Germany (Official German Charts)	85
Ireland (IRMA)	45
Poland (ZPAV)	100
UK Singles (OCC)	69
US Hot Dance/Electronic Songs (Billboard)	31

2022 year-end chart performance for "Out Out"
Chart (2022)	Position
US Hot Dance/Electronic Songs (Billboard)	84

== Certifications ==
Certifications for "Out Out"
Region	Certification	Certified units/sales
Australia (ARIA)	Gold	35,000^{‡}
Austria (IFPI Austria)	Platinum	30,000^{‡}
Canada (Music Canada)	2× Platinum	160,000^{‡}
Denmark (IFPI Danmark)	Platinum	90,000^{‡}
France (SNEP)	Gold	100,000^{‡}
Germany (BVMI)	Gold	200,000^{‡}
Italy (FIMI)	Platinum	100,000^{‡}
New Zealand (RMNZ)	Platinum	30,000^{‡}
Poland (ZPAV)	Platinum	50,000^{‡}
Portugal (AFP)	Gold	5,000^{‡}
Spain (Promusicae)	Gold	30,000^{‡}
Switzerland (IFPI Switzerland)	Platinum	20,000^{‡}
United Kingdom (BPI)	Platinum	600,000^{‡}
United States (RIAA)	Gold	500,000^{‡}
^{‡} Sales+streaming figures based on certification alone.

== Release history ==
Release dates and formats for "Out Out"
Region	Date	Format(s)	Label	Ref.
Various	13 August 2021	Digital download; streaming	Asylum Records UK	

== See also ==
- List of Billboard number-one dance songs of 2021
