= Vibrator =

Vibrator may refer to:

== Technology ==
- Vibrator (sex toy), a device for massage or sexual pleasure used by both men and women
- Vibrator (mechanical), a class of devices which create mechanical vibrations for uses such as signaling annunciators, doorbells, or industrial uses such as compacting gravel, transporting materials, cleaning, etc.
- Vibrator (electronic), an electronic component in DC power supplies for generating high voltage made obsolete by the late 1960s
- Vibrating alert, used in mobile phones and pagers

== Music ==
- Vibrator (music), a musical instrument
- The Vibrators, a British punk band
- Vibrator (album), a 1995 album by Terence Trent D'Arby
- "Vibrator", a song by Motörhead on Motörhead (album)
- "Vibrator", a song by Electric Six, on their second album Senor Smoke

== Other ==
- Multivibrator, an electronic circuit to implement a variety of simple devices
- Vibroseis, a mobile energy source used in seismic exploration
- Vibrator (film), a 2003 film
