= Vibrations (Eurobeat label) =

Italian label

Vibration is an Italian Eurobeat label under LED Records, created by Luigi Stanga and Gino Caria in 1995 to target the Japanese marketplace.

There are 155 songs under "Vibration" label in total, two of which have been lost during a move of LED's recording studio, but appeared in October 2021.

== Branch Labels ==
=== Eurobeat Masters ===
Eurobeat Masters is an Italian Eurobeat & Speed label under LED Records, founded by Luigi Stanga and Davide Di Marcantonio in 2000. Many songs of this label are mixed into Dancemania CDs and used as game music in the Dance Dance Revolution series of video games.

There are 27 songs under "Eurobeat Masters" label, all of which have been released.

=== Energy Revolution ===
Energy Revolution is an Italian Eurobeat label under LED Records, founded by Luigi Stanga and Davide Di Marcantonio in 2000. Many songs, marked as the different artists but the same title, are the same as those under Vibration.

There are 40 songs under "Energy Revolution" label, all of which have been released.

== Release Details ==
- Before December 2007, LED Records released some songs on Music Master TV, a Japanese Online Music Store shut down since 30 April 2009.
- In 2008, LED Records launched an entire release of their songs on Juno Download and iTunes Music Store. Nearly all songs under Vibration, Eurobeat Masters and Energy Revolution have been released except following songs.
  - "Sugar Love" by Sharon K. (VIB 068)
  - "Mystic Wings Of Fire" by Jimmy Bravo (VIB 145)
  - "Me And My" by Maria Short (VIB 146)
  - "Jumping To Joy" by Queen Regina (VIB 147)
  - "Fly" by Dee Dee (VIB 148)
  - "My Heart Will Go On (Euro Remix)" by Deja Vu feat. Tasmin (EM 001)
  - "Super Super Hero (2001 Remix)" by Fireman (EM 007)
- From 2011 to 2013, LED Records started their second release on iTunes Music Store by selling digital releases "Supereurobeat" series. After this release, all songs have been released except following two lost songs.
  - "Me And My" by Maria Short
  - "Fly" by Dee Dee
- In October 2021, "Fly" and "Me & My" have been finally released.
