= Everybody Loves the Sunshine =

1976 studio album by Roy Ayers

Studio album by Roy Ayers
- Released: May 12, 1976
- Studios: Electric Lady (New York); Larrabee (West Hollywood)
- Genres: R&B; soul; jazz
- Length: 39:25
- Label: Polydor
- Producers: Roy Ayers, Maurice Green

Roy Ayers chronology
Mystic Voyage (1975)	Everybody Loves the Sunshine (1976)	Vibrations (1976)

Professional ratings
Review scores
Source	Rating
AllMusic	4/5 stars

Everybody Loves the Sunshine is a studio album by Roy Ayers released under the Roy Ayers Ubiquity umbrella. It was released through Polydor Records in 1976. It peaked at number 51 on the Billboard 200 chart. In 2016, Pitchfork placed the title track at number 72 on the "200 Best Songs of the 1970s" list.

The song "Everybody Loves the Sunshine" has been covered by artists including D'Angelo, Takuya Kuroda, the Robert Glasper Experiment, Seu Jorge and others. It has been sampled nearly 200 times by artists including Tupac Shakur, Mary J. Blige, and Dr. Dre.

== Track listing ==
No.	Title	Writer(s)	Length
1.	"Hey Uh What You Say Come On"	Roy Ayers, William Allen	3:45
2.	"The Golden Rod"	Roy Ayers	3:03
3.	"Keep On Walking"	Gino Vannelli	3:45
4.	"You and Me My Love"	Roy Ayers, Chano O'Ferral	3:11
5.	"The Third Eye"	Roy Ayers	6:21
6.	"It Ain't Your Sign It's Your Mind"	Roy Ayers	3:28
7.	"People and the World"	Roy Ayers	4:48
8.	"Everybody Loves the Sunshine"	Roy Ayers	3:59
9.	"Tongue Power"	Roy Ayers, Chano O'Ferral	3:02
10.	"Lonesome Cowboy"	Roy Ayers	4:03

== Personnel ==
Credits adapted from liner notes.

Roy Ayers Ubiquity

- Roy Ayers – vibraphone, lead vocals, electric piano, synthesizer (ARP, String Ensemble), percussion, backing vocals
- Philip Woo – piano, electric piano, synthesizer (ARP, String Ensemble)
- Chano O'Ferral – congas, percussion, lead vocals
- Ronald "Head" Drayton – guitar
- John "Shaun" Solomon – electric bass
- Doug Rhodes – drums
- Chicas (Debbie Darby) – lead vocals, backing vocals

Technical

- Leonid Lubianitsky – front cover photography

== Charts ==
Chart (1976–2026)	Peak position
US Billboard 200	51
US Top Contemporary Jazz Albums (Billboard)	15
US Top Jazz Albums (Billboard)	24
US Top R&B/Hip-Hop Albums (Billboard)	10
