= Head & Heart =

Single by Joel Corry

Single by Joel Corry and MNEK

from the album Another Friday Night
- Released: 3 July 2020
- Recorded: 2019–2020
- Genre: House
- Length: 2:48
- Label: Perfect Havoc; Asylum; Atlantic
- Composers: Joel Corry; Neave Applebaum; Daniel Dare; John "Yeah Boy" Courtidis; Lewis Thompson
- Lyricists: Robert Michael Nelson Harvey; Uzoechi Emenike; Leo Kalyan
- Producers: Kolidescopes; Corry; Thompson; Applebaum

Joel Corry singles chronology
"Lonely" (2020)	"Head & Heart" (2020)	"Bed" (2021)

MNEK singles chronology
"Valentino" (2019)	"Head & Heart" (2020)	"Run for Cover" (2021)

Music video
- "Head & Heart" on YouTube

"Head & Heart" is a song by British DJ and producer Joel Corry and British singer MNEK. It was released as a single on 3 July 2020. The song reached number one on the UK Singles Chart in July 2020, becoming the first chart-topper for both Corry and MNEK in their native country. The song has also entered the US Billboard Hot 100; it is the first and second entry on the chart for Joel Corry and MNEK, respectively. The song was nominated for Song of the Year at the 2021 Brit Awards.

At the APRA Music Awards of 2022, the song won Most Performed Australian Work and Most Performed Dance/Electronic Work.

On 9 December 2022, the song surpassed 1 billion streams on Spotify.

== Background ==
Corry and MNEK told Notion magazine how the collaboration came about:

Joel: I was working on the track last year and at the time, I was launching my single “Lonely” before, so I couldn’t really get my head fully into it. I had this demo and I just knew this track was special. I totally connected with it. Once I got “Lonely” out at the beginning of the year, I started to have the headspace to work on it [“Head & Heart”]. It was far from finished, I knew it needed a new vocal, it needed new parts written. The demo got into MNEK’s hands, thank God [he chuckles]. He messaged me, said he loved the record as well, which meant a lot to me. I’ve been a big fan of MNEK’s for years so when he hit me up, I was like, gheez! He was into re-vocaling the track and he wrote the parts it needed. He was the missing piece of the puzzle. He brought it all together. He sent me his bits and I was blown away by it. I couldn’t be happier with how it’s come out, it’s amazing.

MNEK: I did my bits the day after I heard the song. I had nothing else to do so I was like, let’s go and do that. I did it and sent the parts. To finish the record, me and Joel were WhatsApping each other back and forth about changes on the song constantly – like daily! About can we put this bit back in, can we take this one out, do you like the synth part added… it was very much that via WhatsApp. It was cool to go back and forth in that way. We were both so excited about the song and it coming out. Obviously, we couldn’t be in the same room, but it was nice for Joel to keep me in the loop with everything that was going on with the song because he could have easily kept me out of it but he respected that I care about everything, and I loved this song as well. It was both of us really excited about it.

== Chart performance ==
"Head & Heart" reached number one in the United Kingdom on 24 July 2020, after first entering the UK Singles Chart at number fifteen two weeks earlier. It became both Corry and MNEK's first number one in their native country and remained at the top position for six consecutive weeks, and was certified Platinum for exceeding 600,000 units on 11 September 2020. The song went on to spend 71 weeks on the UK Singles Chart.

"Head & Heart" also reached number one in Ireland and the Netherlands and was a top ten hit in several other countries, including Australia, Belgium, Denmark, Germany, New Zealand and Sweden. It also peaked at number 12 in Greece.

== Music video ==
The official music video, directed by Elliot Sampson, was shot via split screen and plays on the duality of head and heart. It was described by CelebMix's Katrina Rees as:

The video follows a day in the life of a particular man and offers two very different takes.

On the left side of the screen, we see a man with the weight of the world on his shoulders. In his grey-coloured world, he tries to get out of bed and start his day: he gets picked on by a gang of his friends on his way to work, he misses the bus and is also later attacked in his workplace.

However, on the other side of the screen, we see a guy living his best life in a world full of colours. Getting ready for the day ahead with ease, he plays football with the gang, enjoys music through his headphones while waiting for the bus and is celebrated at work by everyone around him.

By the end of the evening, the two versions bump into each other, although while the man who was struggling is confused by it all, the happy-go-lucky version fills him with hope before disappearing. Joel and MNEK (who looks very serious) also appear in the video, with clips of them performing the song intertwined within the story.

== Track listing ==
Digital download
No.	Title	Length
1.	"Head & Heart (Tiesto VIP Mix)"	2:46

Digital download – The Remixes (Part 1)
No.	Title	Length
1.	"Head & Heart" (Jack Back Remix)	4:20
2.	"Head & Heart" (Vintage Culture & Fancy Inc Remix)	3:35
3.	"Head & Heart" (Majestic Remix)	2:54
4.	"Head & Heart" (NightFunk Remix)	3:28

Digital download – The Remixes (Part 2)
No.	Title	Length
1.	"Head & Heart" (Timmy Trumpet Remix)	3:04
2.	"Head & Heart" (Jess Bays Remix)	3:20
3.	"Head & Heart" (KOLIDESCOPES Remix)	3:29
4.	"Head & Heart" (Kokiri Remix)	3:10
5.	"Head & Heart" (Simon Field Remix)	3:10
6.	"Head & Heart" (Mashd N Kutcher Remix)	2:58

== Charts ==
=== Weekly charts ===
Chart (2020–2024)	Peak position
Australia (ARIA)	2
Austria (Ö3 Austria Top 40)	5
Belarus Airplay (TopHit)	172
Belgium (Ultratop 50 Flanders)	1
Belgium (Ultratop 50 Wallonia)	3
Brazil (Top 100 Brasil)	59
Canada Hot 100 (Billboard)	35
Canada Hot AC (Billboard)	47
Canada CHR/Top 40 (Billboard)	28
CIS Airplay (TopHit)	4
Czech Republic Airplay (ČNS IFPI)	1
Czech Republic Singles Digital (ČNS IFPI)	4
Croatia International Airplay (Top lista)	8
Denmark (Tracklisten)	4
Estonia Airplay (TopHit)	110
France (SNEP)	46
Germany (GfK)	4
Greece (IFPI)	12
Global 200 (Billboard)	17
Hungary (Dance Top 40)	1
Hungary (Rádiós Top 40)	1
Hungary (Single Top 40)	2
Hungary (Stream Top 40)	2
Iceland (Tónlistinn)	5
Ireland (IRMA)	1
Israel (Media Forest)	1
Italy (FIMI)	7
Lithuania (AGATA)	2
Lithuania Airplay (TopHit)	65
Mexico Airplay (Billboard)	2
Moldova Airplay (TopHit)	52
Netherlands (Dutch Top 40)	1
Netherlands (Single Top 100)	2
New Zealand (Recorded Music NZ)	5
Norway (VG-lista)	11
Poland Airplay (ZPAV)	3
Portugal (AFP)	15
Romania (Airplay 100)	2
Russia Airplay (TopHit)	6
San Marino (SMRRTV Top 50)	1
Scottish Singles Sales (Official Charts)	1
Slovakia Airplay (ČNS IFPI)	1
Slovakia Singles Digital (ČNS IFPI)	1
Slovenia (SloTop50)	1
South Africa (RISA)	7
Spain (PROMUSICAE)	79
Suriname (Nationale Top 40)	2
Sweden (Sverigetopplistan)	4
Switzerland (Schweizer Hitparade)	4
Ukraine Airplay (TopHit)	38
UK Singles (Official Charts)	1
UK Dance (Official Charts)	1
US Billboard Hot 100	99
US Hot Dance/Electronic Songs (Billboard)	3
US Pop Airplay (Billboard)	25

=== Monthly charts ===
Monthly chart performance for "Head & Heart"
Chart (2020–2024)	Peak position
CIS Airplay (TopHit)	6
Czech Republic (Rádio Top 100)	3
Czech Republic (Singles Digitál Top 100)	5
Lithuania Airplay (TopHit)	71
Moldova Airplay (TopHit)	78
Russia Airplay (TopHit)	7
Slovakia (Rádio Top 100)	1
Slovakia (Singles Digitál Top 100)	1
Ukraine Airplay (TopHit)	75

=== Year-end charts ===
2020 year-end chart performance for "Head & Heart"
Chart (2020)	Position
Australia (ARIA)	23
Austria (Ö3 Austria Top 40)	27
Belgium (Ultratop Flanders)	21
Belgium (Ultratop Wallonia)	45
CIS Airplay (TopHit)	36
Denmark (Tracklisten)	30
Germany (Official German Charts)	26
Hungary (Dance Top 40)	26
Hungary (Rádiós Top 40)	22
Hungary (Single Top 40)	19
Hungary (Stream Top 40)	15
Ireland (IRMA)	3
Italy (FIMI)	48
Netherlands (Dutch Top 40)	2
Netherlands (Single Top 100)	15
Poland (ZPAV)	30
Romania (Airplay 100)	85
Russia Airplay (TopHit)	59
Sweden (Sverigetopplistan)	16
Switzerland (Schweizer Hitparade)	32
UK Singles (OCC)	5
US Hot Dance/Electronic Songs (Billboard)	13

2021 year-end chart performance for "Head & Heart"
Chart (2021)	Position
Australia (ARIA)	20
Austria (Ö3 Austria Top 40)	25
Belgium (Ultratop Flanders)	13
CIS Airplay (TopHit)	38
Denmark (Tracklisten)	25
Germany (Official German Charts)	12
Global 200 (Billboard)	38
Hungary (Dance Top 40)	6
Hungary (Rádiós Top 40)	7
Hungary (Single Top 40)	93
Hungary (Stream Top 40)	15
Ireland (IRMA)	16
Italy (FIMI)	78
Netherlands (Dutch Top 40)	82
Netherlands (Single Top 100)	25
New Zealand (Recorded Music NZ)	29
Poland (ZPAV)	94
Portugal (AFP)	53
Russia Airplay (TopHit)	50
Sweden (Sverigetopplistan)	27
Switzerland (Schweizer Hitparade)	23
UK Singles (OCC)	17
US Hot Dance/Electronic Songs (Billboard)	9

2022 year-end chart performance for "Head & Heart"
Chart (2022)	Position
Australia (ARIA)	97
Belgium (Ultratop 50 Flanders)	129
CIS Airplay (TopHit)	198
Hungary (Dance Top 40)	51

2023 year-end chart performance for "Head & Heart"
Chart (2023)	Position
Moldova Airplay (TopHit)	164

2024 year-end chart performance for "Head & Heart"
Chart (2024)	Position
Lithuania Airplay (TopHit)	54

2025 year-end chart performance for "Head & Heart"
Chart (2025)	Position
Estonia Airplay (TopHit)	181
Lithuania Airplay (TopHit)	127

== Certifications ==
Region	Certification	Certified units/sales
Australia (ARIA)	6× Platinum	420,000^{‡}
Austria (IFPI Austria)	Platinum	30,000^{‡}
Belgium (BRMA)	2× Platinum	80,000^{‡}
Brazil (Pro-Música Brasil)	Gold	20,000^{‡}
Canada (Music Canada)	5× Platinum	400,000^{‡}
Denmark (IFPI Danmark)	3× Platinum	270,000^{‡}
France (SNEP)	Diamond	333,333^{‡}
Germany (BVMI)	2× Platinum	800,000^{‡}
Italy (FIMI)	3× Platinum	210,000^{‡}
Netherlands (NVPI)	Platinum	80,000^{‡}
New Zealand (RMNZ)	5× Platinum	150,000^{‡}
Norway (IFPI Norway)	Platinum	60,000^{‡}
Poland (ZPAV)	3× Platinum	60,000^{‡}
Portugal (AFP)	2× Platinum	20,000^{‡}
Spain (Promusicae)	Platinum	60,000^{‡}
Switzerland (IFPI Switzerland)	4× Platinum	80,000^{‡}
United Kingdom (BPI)	5× Platinum	3,000,000^{‡}
United States (RIAA)	Platinum	1,000,000^{‡}
^{‡} Sales+streaming figures based on certification alone.

== Release history ==
Region	Date	Format	Label
Various	3 July 2020	Digital download; streaming	Perfect Havoc; Asylum
United States	1 September 2020	Contemporary hit radio	Big Beat; EMG

== See also ==
- List of number-one singles of 2020 (Ireland)
- List of UK Singles Chart number ones of the 2020s
- List of Billboard number-one dance songs of 2020
- List of UK Dance Singles Chart number ones of 2020
