= Da Hool =

German DJ and producer (born 1968)

- Also known as: DJ Hooligan
- Born: Frank Tomiczek; 30 December 1968 (age 57); Bottrop, West Germany
- Genres: Acid house, electro house, house
- Years active: Late 1980s – present
- Label: Play It Again Sam
- Website: https://www.hool.tv/

Frank Tomiczek (born 30 December 1968), better known as Da Hool, is a German DJ and producer. It was in Bottrop that he first honed his skills as a DJ, and by 1990 he was an acclaimed performer in his native country.

== Musical career ==
His early tracks include "B.O.T.T.R.O.P.", "It's a Dream Song", and "Rave Nation". In 1996, he released "Meet Her at the Love Parade", which (when re-released a year later on the German label Kosmo Records) became a worldwide hit, selling over six million copies. "Meet Her at the Love Parade" reached No. 15 on the UK Singles Chart in February 1998 (Germany #4, France #4, Netherlands #11, Ireland #7). Further UK charting singles included "Bora Bora" (UK #35, 1998) and "Meet Her at the Love Parade 2001" (UK #11, 2001).

== Discography ==
=== Studio albums ===
Year	Album details
1997	Here Comes Da Hool: Release date: 17 November 1997; Label: Kosmo Records
2008	Light My Fire: Release date: 14 November 2008; Label: PIAS Germany

=== Compilation albums ===
Year	Album details
1995	3 Years to Become a Ravermaniac (as DJ Hooligan): Release date: 8 February 1995; Label: No Respect Records

=== Singles ===
Year	Single	Peak chart positions										Certifications (sales thresholds)	Album
Year	Single	GER	AUS	AUT	BEL (Wa)	FRA	IRE	NED	SWI	UK	US Dance	Certifications (sales thresholds)	Album
1994	"Rave Nation" (as DJ Hooligan)	16	—	30	—	—	—	—	19	—	—		Singles only
1995	"Sueño Futuro (Wake Up and Dream)" (as DJ Hooligan)	51	—	—	—	—	—	—	39	—	—		Singles only
1996	"System Ecstasy" (as DJ Hooligan)	—	—	—	—	—	—	—	—	—	—		Singles only
1996	"I Want You"	94	—	—	—	—	—	—	—	—	—		Singles only
1997	"Meet Her at the Love Parade"	4	21	23	9	4	7	11	17	15	30	FRA: Silver; UK: Silver	Here Comes Da Hool
1997	"Bora Bora"	21	80	—	—	—	19	58	—	35	—		Here Comes Da Hool
1998	"T.H.M."	—	—	—	—	20	—	—	—	—	—		Singles only
1998	"Hypochonda"	49	—	—	—	—	—	—	—	—	—		Singles only
1998	"Mama Sweet"	68	—	—	—	—	—	—	—	—	12		Singles only
1999	"Wankers on Duty"	38	—	—	—	—	—	—	—	151	—		Singles only
1999	"Eichelrück"	61	—	—	—	—	—	—	—	82	—		Singles only
2001	"Meet Her at the Love Parade (The 2001 Remixes)"	67	—	—	—	—	20	—	—	11	—		Singles only
2015	"MHATLP (HI-LO Edit)" (with Oliver Heldens)	—	—	—	—	—	—	—	—	—	—		Singles only
2022	"The Parade" (with Joel Corry)	—	—	—	—	—	—	—	—	—	—		Singles only
2024	"Meet Her at the Love Parade" (with Dimitri Vegas & Like Mike, Maddix featuring Kiki Solvej)	—	—	—	—	—	—	—	—	—	—		Singles only
"—" denotes releases that did not chart.
