= Tazer (musician) =

- Born: Tomi Adenlé; 9 October 1990 (age 35); Nigeria
- Genres: House; garage; UK funky; deep house; hip hop
- Occupations: Producer; radio DJ; DJ
- Years active: 2014–present
- Labels: Sony Music; Black Butter
- Spouse: Kamille (m. 2021)
- Website: tazerofficial.com

Tomi Adenlé, better known as Tazer is a DJ, record producer and remixer from Oxford, England.

== Biography ==
Tazer is an Oxford-raised, London-based musician and DJ. He started out in 2014 with a string of releases on various house music labels including Recess Recordings and Black Butter Records. In 2015, Tazer was eventually signed to Black Butter Records, a subsidiary of Sony Music.

In 2015, Tazer released "Wet Dollars". The song featured a sample from The Notorious B.I.G and the vocals of XXL's 2015 freshman class rapper and singer, Tink. It was released in August of that year. The song was also accompanied with a music video set in New York City which debut on MTV a week later. A Wet Dollars remix EP was also released featuring Remixes from Redlight, Melé, MSCLS and Zeds Dead.

He has also remixed artists such as Crookers, Ellie Goulding and Maverick Sabre.

In November 2015, Tazer released the video for his planned second single "Vibrate". The song made it to Number 1 on BBC Radio 1's official dance chart, as well as being added to the playlist of BBC Radio 1Xtra. It was planned for a 2016 debut but was never released.

In 2017, Tazer's second single, "Rave Slave" was released via Beatport through Tough Love's label Get Twisted Records.

In 2019, Tazer released the single "I'm On Fire". The song featured singer MAAD and rapper Keys the Prince. A year later, he released another two singles, "Werk!" and "In The Fix".

== Discography ==
=== Extended plays ===
Year	EP
2015	Wet Dollars (Remixes): Released: 7 August 2015; Label: Black Butter Records; Format: Digital Download

=== Singles ===
Year	Title	Peak chart positions	Album
Year	Title	UK	Album
2015	"Wet Dollars" (featuring Tink)	30	Think Tink (US Only)
2016	"Vibrate"	–	Non-album single
2017	"Rave Slave"	–	Rave Slave EP
2017	"LowKey Groove"	–	Rave Slave EP
2019	"I'm On Fire" (featuring MAAD and Keys the Prince)	–	Non-album singles
2020	"Werk!"	–	Non-album singles
2020	"In The Fix"	–	Non-album singles
"—" denotes singles that were not released.

=== Remixes ===
Year	Title	Artist
2014	"Flashlight"	DJ Fresh (featuring Ellie Goulding)
2014	"Leh Go"	Jus Now (featuring Blaxx)
2014	"Who Wants It?"	Louie Anderson
2015	"My City"	George The Poet
2015	"I Just Can't"	Crookers (featuring Jeremih)
2015	"Colours"	Tom Shortez (featuring Lucy Love)
2015	"Preach"	M.O
2015	"Alone No More"	Phillip George
2015	"Say Nada"	Shakka
2016	"Pumping"	IV Rox (featuring Sneakbo)
2016	"Faded"	Alan Walker
2017	"Wonderland"	MAAD
	Addison Lee	Not3s
2018	"Just A Little Crush"	Malia Civetz
2018	"Emotions"	Astrid S
2019	“Bruised Not Broken”	Matoma, MNEK, Kiana Ledé
2019	"Coming Off Strong (Vibez Is Private)"	Quincy
