= Joel Corry =

English DJ, producer and TV personality (born 1989)

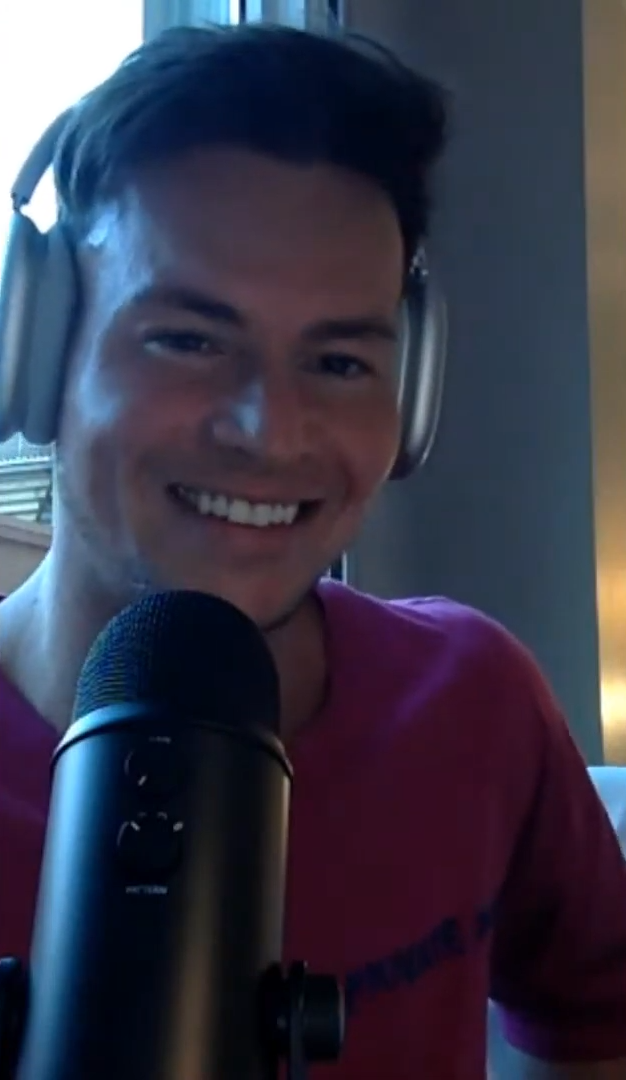
- Corry in 2021

Background information
- Born: 10 June 1989 (age 37); Camden, London, England
- Genres: House; Melbourne bounce; tech house; tropical house
- Occupations: DJ; producer; bodybuilder; television personality
- Instruments: Turntables, sampler, keyboards
- Years active: 2012–present
- Labels: Perfect Havoc; Asylum; Musical Freedom; Atlantic
- Website: www.joelcorry.com

Joel Corry (born 10 June 1989) is an English DJ, producer, bodybuilder, and television personality. He came to prominence in 2019 with the release of his single "Sorry", featuring vocals from Hayley May, which reached number six in the UK Singles Chart. In 2020, Corry released the singles "Lonely" and "Head & Heart". The latter, which features MNEK on vocals, spent six weeks at number one on the UK Singles Chart and also became Corry's first entry on the US Billboard Hot 100.

== Career ==
Corry had a recurring role on MTV reality television series Geordie Shore, alongside his then girlfriend Sophie Kasaei from 2012 to 2013, briefly appearing again in 2017. He also has a personal training business, an app called Joel Corry PT and a gym and leisurewear company Most Rated, which is also the name of his own record label. In 2015 he released his debut singles "Back Again" and "Light It Up". In 2017 he released the singles "Just Wanna", "All the Things", "All Night", "Sunlight" and "Feel This Way". He released the singles "Hurt", "All I Need", "Only You", "Good As Gold" and "Fallen" in 2018 which premiered on Our Culture Mag. In April 2019, he released the single "Sorry"; the song features uncredited vocals from Hayley May. In July 2019, the song broke the record for the most Shazamed track in one day, with 41,000 Shazams. The song was featured on the ITV2 reality television series Love Island. The song peaked at number six on the UK Singles Chart.

In July 2020, Corry achieved his first UK number-one single with the MNEK collaboration "Head & Heart". It stayed at number 1 for six consecutive weeks and became an international hit for Corry. It was certified platinum for exceeding 600,000 units on 11 September 2020.

In July 2022, Corry appeared in an episode of Love Island where he DJed for a party thrown for the islanders.

On 21 October 2022, Corry released "Lionheart (Fearless)" which features singer Tom Grennan. The single debuted at number 37 on the UK singles chart, peaking in its twelfth week on the chart at number 18.

== Discography ==
- Another Friday Night (2023)

== Awards and nominations ==
Joel Corry has won several awards during his music career, such as two APRA Music Awards, and three Electronic Dance Music Awards. Alongside those accolades, he has been nominated for numerous major music awards including, five Brit Awards, two Global Awards and fifteen EDMAs nominations.

Year	Organization	Award	Nominated work	Result	Ref.
2021	BRIT Awards	Song of the Year	"Head & Heart" (with MNEK, RudyWade & Dean Lewis)	Nominated	
2021	BRIT Awards	British Male Solo Artist	Himself	Nominated	
2021	BRIT Awards	Best New Artist	Himself	Nominated	
2021	Music Week Awards	Artist Marketing Campaign	Himself	Nominated	
2022	BRIT Awards	British Song of the Year	"BED" (with RAYE and David Guetta)	Nominated	
2022	BRIT Awards	Best Dance Act	Himself	Nominated	
2022	APRA Music Awards	Most Performed Dance/Electronic Work	"Head & Heart" (with MNEK)	Won	
2022	APRA Music Awards	Most Performed Australian Work	"Head & Heart" (with MNEK)	Won	
2022	Electronic Dance Music Awards	Best Collaboration	"BED" (with RAYE and David Guetta)How Do l Say Goodbye (with Dean Lewis)	Nominated	
2022	Electronic Dance Music Awards	Remix of The Year	Ed Sheeran – "Bad Habits" (Joel Corry remix)	Nominated	
2022	Electronic Dance Music Awards	Remixer of The Year	Himself	Nominated	
2022	Electronic Dance Music Awards	Best Down Tempo Turned Up	Megan Thee Stallion – "Body" (Joel Corry remix)	Nominated	
2023	Electronic Dance Music Awards	Dance Song of The Year (Radio)	"HISTORY" (with Becky Hill)	Nominated	
2023	Electronic Dance Music Awards	Artist of The Year (Male)	Himself	Won	
2023	Electronic Dance Music Awards	Dance Radio Artist of The Year	Himself	Nominated	
2023	Electronic Dance Music Awards	Producer of The Year	Himself	Nominated	
2023	Electronic Dance Music Awards	Music Video of The Year	"Lionheart (Fearless)" (with Tom Grennan)	Nominated	
2023	Electronic Dance Music Awards	Mashup of The Year	"Party Up" (Angelo The Kid "The Parade" edit) [with Landis, Da Hool & DMX)	Won	
2023	Electronic Dance Music Awards	Remix of The Year	Elton John & Britney Spears - "Hold Me Closer" (Joel Corry remix)	Won	
2023	Electronic Dance Music Awards	Remixer of The Year	Himself	Nominated	
2023	Electronic Dance Music Awards	Best Down Tempo Turned Up	Meghan Trainor - "Made You Look" (Joel Corry remix)	Nominated	
2023	Electronic Dance Music Awards	Best Use of Sample	"OUT OUT" (with Jax Jones featuring Charli XCX and Saweetie)	Nominated	
2023	Global Awards	Best British Act	Himself	Nominated	
2024	Global Awards	Best Male	Himself	Nominated	
2024	Electronic Dance Music Awards	Best Collaboration	"0800 HEAVEN" (with Nathan Dawe and Ella Henderson)	Nominated	
