= List of UK top-ten singles in 2024 =

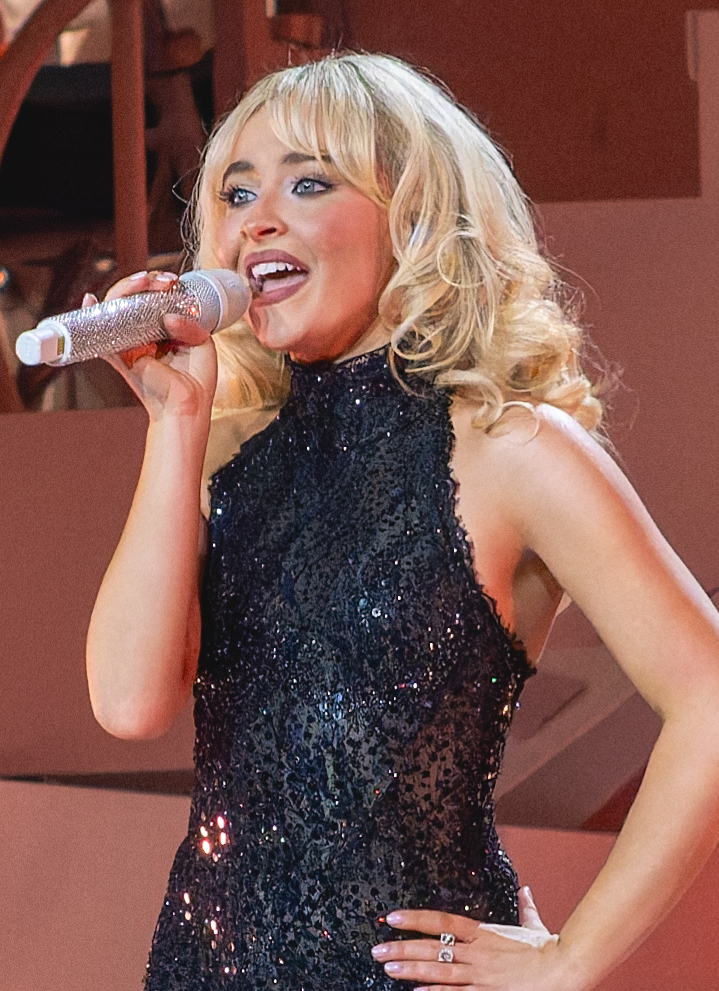
Sabrina Carpenter made the UK top 10 for the first time this year, with four entries making the countdown, including three consecutive number-ones; "Espresso" (number three in the list of this year's best-selling singles), "Please Please Please" (number ten in the best sellers list) and "Taste". Carpenter also set several records, including becoming the female solo artist with the most combined weeks at number-one in a calendar year, with 21 in total.

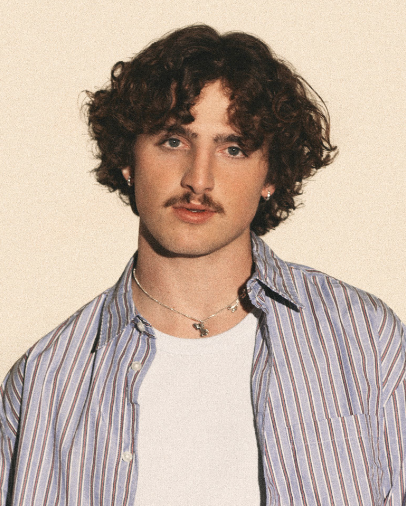
Benson Boone had the second biggest selling single of 2024 with "Beautiful Things", which spent two weeks at number-one and lasted 34 non-consecutive weeks in the top 10.

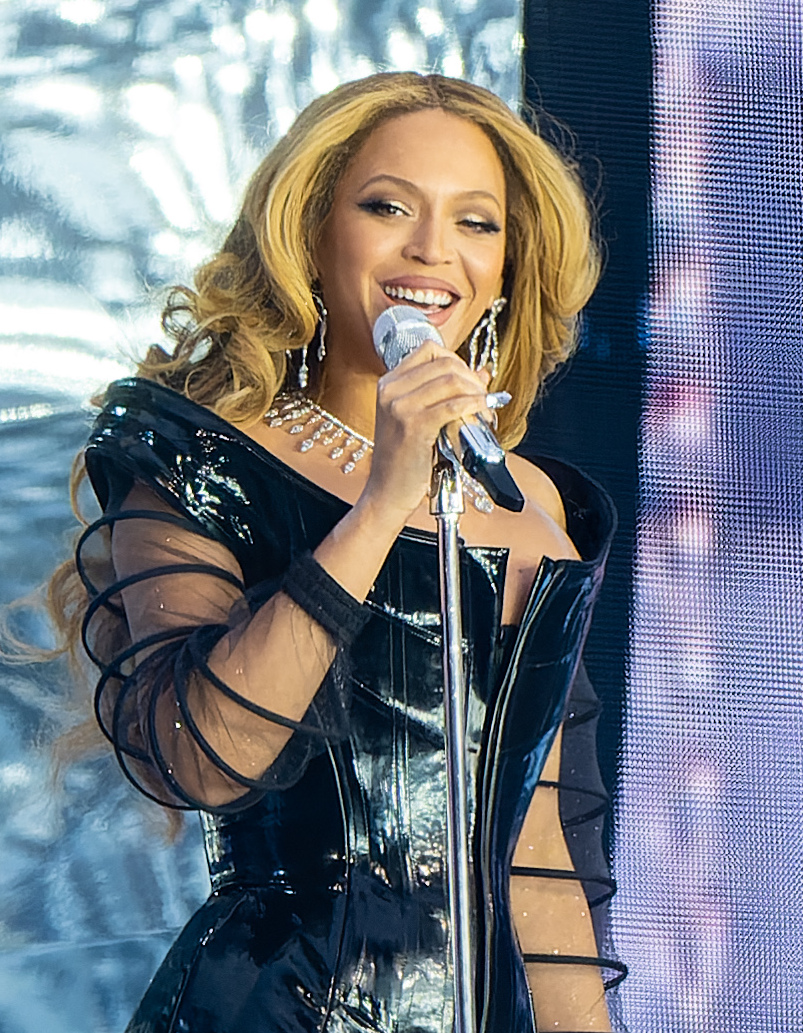
Beyoncé achieved three top 10 singles in 2024, all featuring a country-tinged flavour, with "Texas Hold 'Em" spending five non-consecutive weeks at number-one.

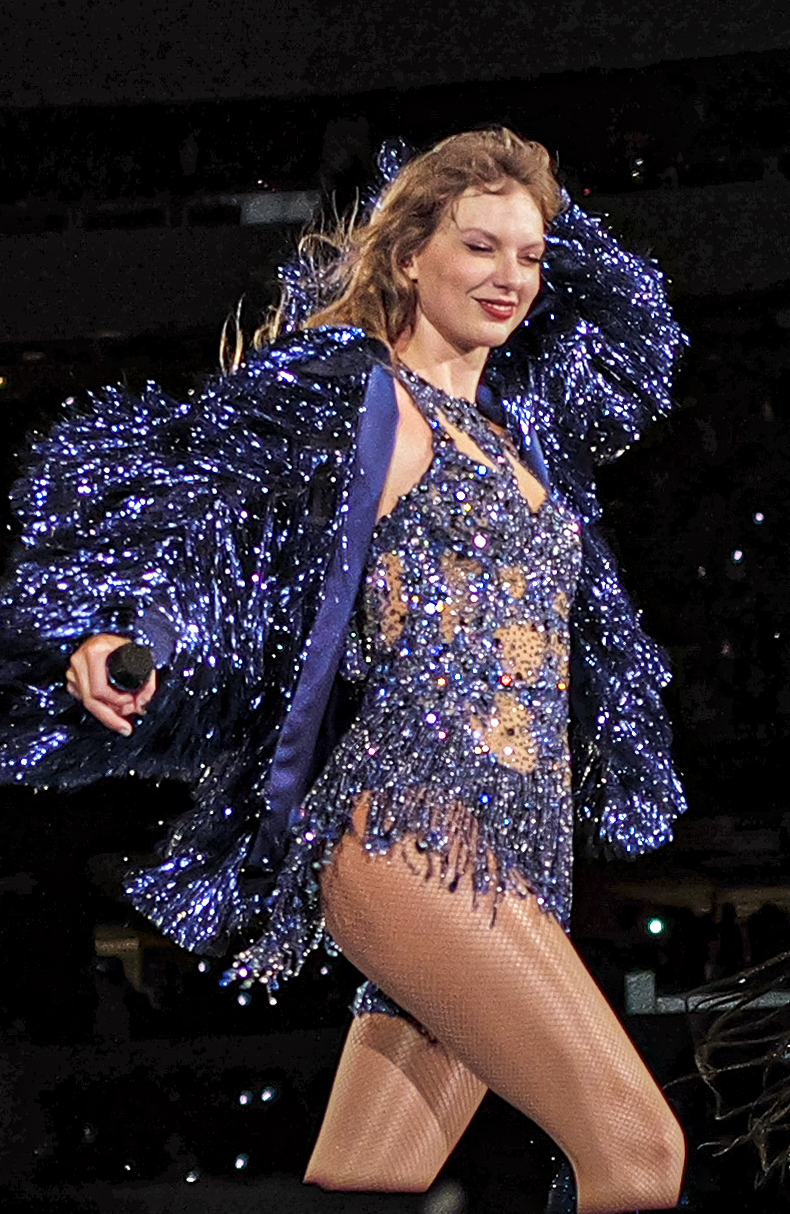
Taylor Swift's chart dominance continued into this year after she earned her third Chart Double when her fourth number-one single "Fortnight" topped the UK charts simultaneously to the parent album The Tortured Poets Department topping the UK Albums Chart. Swift secured a further four top 10 singles during the year.

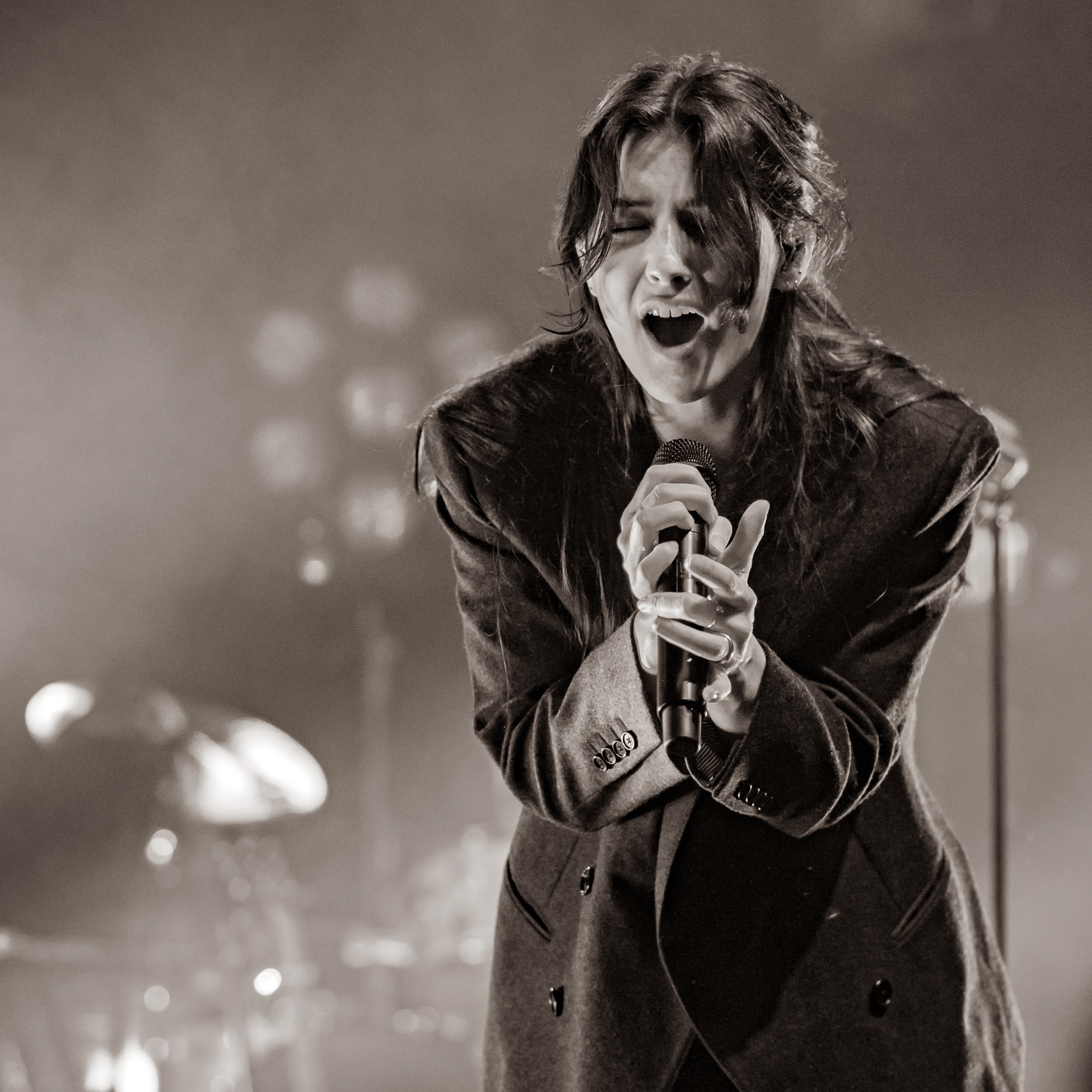
Gracie Abrams secured two top 10 singles in 2024, including the number-one hit "That's So True".

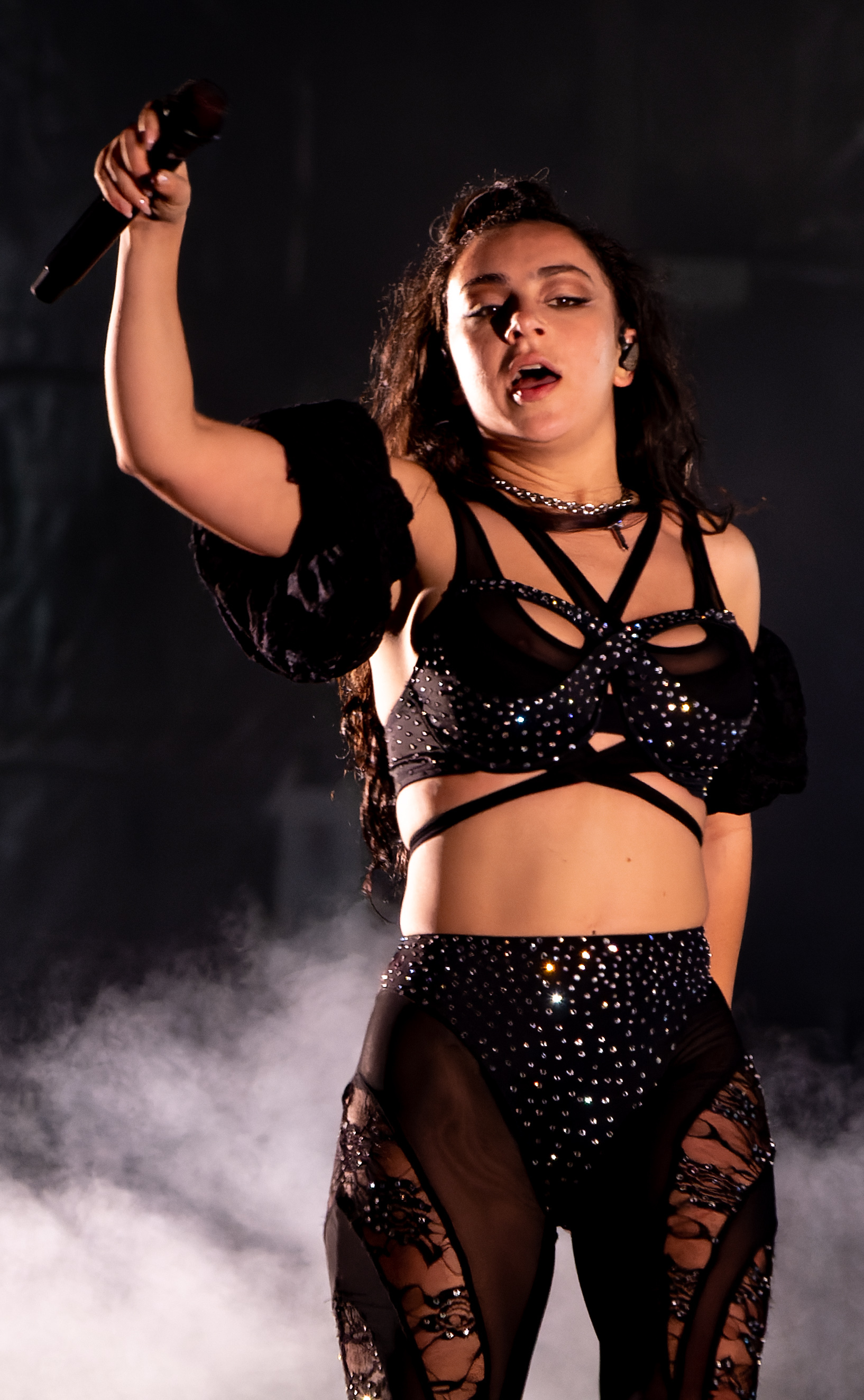
Charli XCX achieved three top 10 singles this year, including the number-one hit "Guess", featuring Billie Eilish.

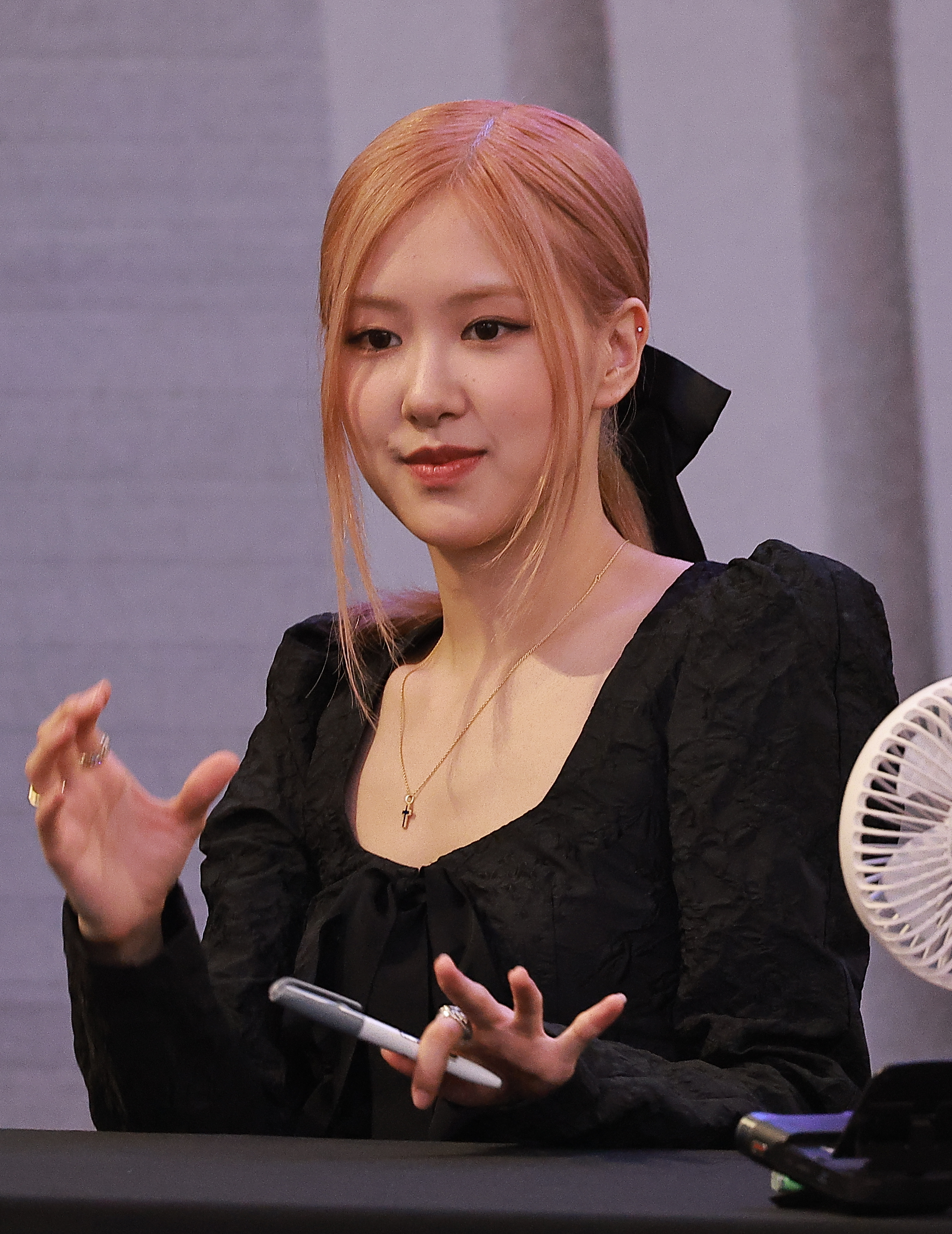
In October 2024, Rosé of Blackpink became the first K-pop female solo artist to reach the top 10 of the UK Singles Chart with "APT.", featuring a guest appearance from Bruno Mars, which later peaked at number two.

The UK Singles Chart is one of many music charts compiled by the Official Charts Company that calculates the best-selling singles of the week in the United Kingdom. Since 2004 the chart has been based on the sales of both physical singles and digital downloads, with airplay figures excluded from the official chart. Since 2014, the singles chart has been based on both sales and streaming, with the ratio altered in 2017 to 150:1 streams and only three singles by the same artist eligible for the chart. From July 2018, video streams from YouTube Music and Spotify among others began to be counted for the Official Charts. This list shows singles that peaked in the Top 10 of the UK Singles Chart during 2024, as well as singles which peaked in 2023 and 2025 but were in the top 10 in 2024. The entry date is when the song appeared in the top 10 for the first time (week ending, as published by the Official Charts Company, which is six days after the chart is announced).

One hundred singles were in the top ten this year. Fourteen singles from 2023 remained in the top 10 for several weeks at the beginning of the year, while "Not Like Us" by Kendrick Lamar, "Luther" by Kendrick Lamar and SZA, "Jingle Bell Rock" by Bobby Helms, "It Can't Be Christmas" by Tom Grennan, "Underneath the Tree" by Kelly Clarkson and "Messy" by Lola Young were all released in 2024 but did not reach their peak until 2025. "Stick Season" by Noah Kahan, "Merry Christmas" by Ed Sheeran and Elton John and "It's Beginning to Look a Lot Like Christmas" by Michael Bublé were the songs from 2023 to reach their peak in 2024. "Rockin' Around the Christmas Tree" by Brenda Lee charted in 2023 and re-entered the top 10 in 2024, but did not reach its peak until 2025. Teddy Swims, Benson Boone, Artemas, Dasha, Sabrina Carpenter, Chappell Roan and Gracie Abrams were among the many artists who achieved their first top 10 single in 2024.

Country music dominated the UK Singles Chart during the first half of 2024, with an unprecedented six country music songs entering the top ten in the space of four months, with "Texas Hold 'Em" by Beyoncé being the highest-charting of these, reaching number-one.

The 2023 Christmas number-one, "Last Christmas" by Wham!, originally released in 1984, remained at number-one for the first week of 2024. The song later returned to number-one in December 2024, and became the Christmas number-one for the second year in a row. The first new number-one single of the year was "Stick Season" by Noah Kahan. Overall, thirteen different songs peaked at number-one in 2024, with Sabrina Carpenter (3) having the most songs hit that position.

== Background ==
=== Multiple entries ===
Ninety-nine singles charted in the top 10 in 2024, with eighty-six singles reaching their peak this year (including the re-entries "Rockin' Around the Christmas Tree", "Merry Christmas" and "It's Beginning to Look a Lot Like Christmas", which charted in previous years but reached peaks on their latest chart run).

=== "Murder on the Dancefloor" returns to the top-ten after use in Saltburn ===
On 5 January 2024 (11 January 2024, week ending), Sophie Ellis-Bextor returned to the UK top-ten for the first time since 2007, when her 2001 hit "Murder on the Dancefloor" re-entered the chart at number 8. The song, which originally peaked at number 2 upon its initial release, witnessed a resurgence in popularity following its use in the film Saltburn. The song also experienced its best ever streaming week, earning 293,000 weekly streams. "Murder on the Dancefloor" reclaimed its 2001 peak of number 2 the following week, and surpassed the previous week's best for Ellis-Bextor by earning the most one-week streams since its release, with 4.7 million UK streams over the previous seven days.

=== Madonna secures first UK top 10 single in fifteen years ===
On 2 February 2024 (8 February 2024, week ending), Madonna secured her first UK top 10 single since "Celebration" in September 2009, thanks to her inclusion on "Popular", also featuring The Weeknd and Playboi Carti, after the song climbed to number 10 in the chart, having spent a total of 12 non-consecutive weeks inside the top 40 before finally breaking into the upper echelons of the chart. Madonna also earned her 64th top 10 hit in the process, extending her record as the female artist with the most UK top 10 singles.

=== Noah Kahan claims coveted Chart Double ===
On 16 February 2024 (22 February 2024, week ending), Noah Kahan claimed the coveted Chart Double after his album Stick Season climbed to number-one in the UK Albums Chart while the album's title track of the same name spent its seventh consecutive week at number-one in the UK Singles Chart.

=== Beyoncé earns first UK number-one single in fourteen years and later secures second Chart Double ===
On 23 February 2024 (29 February 2024, week ending), Beyoncé rose to the top of the UK Singles Chart with "Texas Hold 'Em" after debuting at number 9 the week before. The song became Beyoncé's fifth UK number-one as a solo artist (eighth overall) and her first number-one single in fourteen years, since "Telephone" (a collaboration with Lady Gaga) topped the charts in March 2010. The song initially spent four non-consecutive weeks at the top of the chart, becoming Beyoncé's longest-running UK number-one single to date, before returning to number-one for a fifth non-consecutive week on 5 April 2024 (11 April 2024, week ending), after the album Cowboy Carter debuted at the top of the UK Albums Chart, marking the second time that Beyoncé had secured the UK Chart Double.

=== Taylor Swift's chart dominance continues as she secures her third Chart Double ===
Taylor Swift's dominance of the UK Singles Chart continued into 2024. On 26 April 2024 (2 May 2024, week ending), three tracks from her album The Tortured Poets Department debuted inside the top 5 of the chart, including her duet with Post Malone, "Fortnight", which became her fourth UK number-one single, whilst The Tortured Poets Department debuted at number-one in the UK Albums Chart, thus giving Swift her third Chart Double. "Fortnight" also became Malone's first number-one single in almost seven years, since "Rockstar" topped the charts in 2017. On 3 May 2024 (9 May 2024, week ending), a fourth track from The Tortured Poets Department, "I Can Do It with a Broken Heart", entered the top 10 at number 8.

=== Eminem achieves eleventh UK number-one single ===
On 7 June 2024 (13 June 2024, week ending), Eminem's "Houdini" debuted at the top of the UK Singles Chart, becoming his eleventh number-one single in the United Kingdom, making it on the par with Calvin Harris. During its first week of release, the single accumulated 104,800 chart units, including 13.3 million streams, the biggest opening week for a single of 2024 so far. The song remained at number-one the following week, and became Eminem's first single to spend two weeks at the top of the UK charts.

=== Sabrina Carpenter sets records ===
On 21 June 2024 (27 June 2024, week ending), Sabrina Carpenter, at 25 years, 1 month, 1 week and 3 days old, became the youngest female artist to occupy the number one and number two spots in the UK Singles Chart simultaneously, after "Please Please Please" climbed to the top spot whilst her former chart-topper "Espresso" held at the runner-up position. "Please Please Please" was also the UK's most-streamed song of the week, totalling 9.8 million combined streams, whilst "Espresso" came second, with 8.1 million. On 5 July 2024 (11 July 2024, week ending), Carpenter set yet another record by becoming the first-ever female artist to secure three consecutive weeks at number one and number two spots in the UK Singles Chart concurrently. She also became only the second act to achieve this feat after The Beatles, who achieved the same feat on two occasions, managing three consecutive weeks at numbers one and two in 1963 with "I Want to Hold Your Hand" and "She Loves You" and again in 1967 with "Hello Goodbye" and Magical Mystery Tour (EP). She extended her record to four consecutive weeks on 12 July 2024 (18 July 2024, week ending), whilst "Please Please Please" was dethroned from the summit and "Espresso" rebounded to number-one for a sixth non-consecutive week, then set another record on 19 July 2024 (25 July 2024, week ending), when she became the first-ever female artist to occupy the top two spots of the UK chart for five consecutive weeks, and only the second to ever do so, after Ed Sheeran.

On 30 August 2024 (5 September 2024, week ending), Carpenter made history yet again by becoming the first-ever female artist to occupy the entire top three of the UK Singles Chart, after "Taste" debuted at number-one, becoming her third consecutive chart-topper, whilst "Please Please Please" and "Espresso" climbed back to numbers two and three, respectively. Carpenter also earned her first UK Chart Double as the parent album Short n' Sweet simultaneously debuted at number one on the UK Albums Chart with 89,000 chart sales, the second highest first week sales for an album in 2024. Carpenter set yet another record on 6 September 2024 (12 September 2024, week ending), when she became the first female artist ever to occupy the top three spots of the chart concurrently for two consecutive weeks. On 20 September 2024 (26 September 2024, week ending), during "Taste"'s fourth week at the top spot, Carpenter made history again by becoming the female solo artist with the most combined weeks at number-one in the UK Singles Chart in a calendar year, with 16 in total, eventually extending her record to 21.

=== Charli XCX earns first number-one single in eleven years ===
On 9 August 2024 (15 August 2024, week ending), Charli XCX debuted at the top of the UK Singles Chart with "Guess" which became her second UK number-one single, and first in eleven years since "I Love It" (with Icona Pop) reached the summit in 2013. The song also includes an appearance by Billie Eilish, who secured her third UK number-one single following 2020's "No Time to Die" and 2023's "What Was I Made For?".

=== Chase & Status secure first-ever number-one single ===
On 16 August 2024 (22 August 2024, week ending), "Backbone", a collaboration by Chase & Status and Stormzy, debuted at the top of the UK Singles Chart, and became the first UK number-one single for Chase & Status and the fourth for Stormzy. "Backbone" was the most-streamed track in the UK during its first week of release, accumulating 6.4 million streams.

=== Oasis singles re-enter top-ten simultaneously after reunion announcement ===
In August 2024, 15 years after their initial disbandment, Britpop legends Oasis announced that they would reform for performances in the UK and Ireland in July and August 2025 during their Oasis Live '25 Tour. In the wake of the announcement, sales and streams of their back catalogue increased significantly. On 6 September 2024 (12 September 2024, week ending), "Live Forever" and "Don't Look Back in Anger" re-entered the UK top-ten simultaneously, with "Live Forever" reaching a brand new peak of number 8, surpassing its original peak of number 10 in 1994.

=== Rosé becomes first K-pop female soloist to enter UK top-ten ===
On 25 October 2024 (31 October 2024, week ending), Rosé of Blackpink became the first K-pop female solo artist to enter the top-ten of the UK Singles Chart with "APT.", featuring a guest appearance from Bruno Mars, which debuted at number four. The song later rose to a peak of number two.

=== One Direction singles return to the top-ten after death of Liam Payne ===
Following the death of Liam Payne on 16 October 2024, two One Direction singles simultaneously returned to the top-ten on 25 October 2024 (31 October 2024, week ending). "Night Changes" re-entered the UK Singles Chart at number 6, surpassing the song's original peak of 7 in November 2014. "Story of My Life" also charted at number 9, originally peaking at number 2 in December 2013.

=== "Last Christmas" claims Christmas number-one for the second year in a row ===
On 13 December 2024 (19 December 2024, week ending), Wham!'s "Last Christmas" returned to number-one in the UK Singles Chart for an eighth non-consecutive week, 40 years after its initial release. The song had previously topped the chart in 2020 (for one week), 2022 (for two non-consecutive weeks), and 2023 (for four consecutive weeks) and had claimed the coveted Christmas number-one spot for the first time in its history on 22 December 2023 (28 December 2023, week ending). The following week, the song claimed the Christmas number-one spot for the second year in a row, and became the first-ever single in the chart's 72-year history to clinch two consecutive Christmas number-one victories.

=== Chart debuts ===
Thirty-four artists achieved their first charting top ten single in 2024, either as a lead or featured artist.

The following table (collapsed on desktop site) does not include acts who had previously charted as part of a group and secured their first top ten solo single.

Artist	Number of top 10s	First entry	Chart position	Other entries
Billy Gillies	1	"DNA (Loving You)"	9	—
Hannah Boleyn	1	"DNA (Loving You)"	9	—
Sexyy Red	1	"Rich Baby Daddy"	10	—
Teddy Swims	3	"Lose Control"	2	"The Door" (5), "Bad Dreams" (6)
Playboi Carti	3	"Popular"	10	"Carnival" (5), "Timeless" (7)
Benson Boone	1	"Beautiful Things"	1	—
YG Marley	1	"Praise Jah in the Moonlight"	5	—
Djo	1	"End of Beginning"	4	—
Rich the Kid	1	"Carnival"	5	—
Michael Marcagi	1	"Scared to Start"	9	—
Artemas	1	"I Like the Way You Kiss Me"	3	—
Dasha	1	"Austin"	5	—
Sabrina Carpenter	4	"Espresso"	1	"Please Please Please" (1), "Taste" (1), "Bed Chem" (6)
Shaboozey	1	"A Bar Song (Tipsy)"	3	—
Tommy Richman	1	"Million Dollar Baby"	3	—
Morgan Wallen	1	"I Had Some Help"	2	—
Myles Smith	1	"Stargazing"	4	—
Chappell Roan	2	"Good Luck, Babe!"	2	"Hot to Go!" (4)
Bl3ss	1	"Kisses"	5	—
CamrinWatsin	1	"Kisses"	5	—
bbyclose	1	"Kisses"	5	—
Jordan Adetunji	1	"Kehlani"	8	—
D.O.D.	1	"Somedays"	5	—
Gigi Perez	1	"Sailor Song"	1	—
Gracie Abrams	2	"I Love You, I'm Sorry"	4	"That's So True" (1)
Trippie Redd	1	"Thick of It"	6	—
Adam Port	1	"Move"	10	—
Stryv	1	"Move"	10	—
Malachiii	1	"Move"	10	—
Rosé	1	"APT."	2	—
Addison Rae	1	"Diet Pepsi"	10	—
Lefty Gunplay	1	"TV Off"	6	—
Cynthia Erivo	1	"Defying Gravity"	7	—
Lola Young	1	"Messy"	1	—

Notes

¥$ was an American hip hop supergroup composed of rapper Kanye West and singer Ty Dolla Sign, both of whom had UK top 10 singles, either as solo artists or as part of collaborations with other artists. Perrie and Jade both earned their first UK top 10 singles as solo artists in 2024 with "Forget About Us" and "Angel of My Dreams". These also became their first top 10 entries since the UK girl band Little Mix went on their hiatus in May 2022.

=== Songs from films ===
The only song from a film which entered the top 10 this year was "Defying Gravity" (from Wicked).

=== Best-selling singles ===
Noah Kahan had the best-selling single of the year with "Stick Season". The song spent seven weeks at number-one, sold 2,400,000 copies and was certified 4× platinum by the BPI. "Beautiful Things" by Benson Boone came in second place, while Sabrina Carpenter's "Espresso", Teddy Swims' "Lose Control" and Hozier's "Too Sweet" made up the top five. Songs by Shaboozey, Billie Eilish, Chappell Roan, Dasha and Sabrina Carpenter ("Please Please Please") were also in the top ten best-selling singles of the year.

== Top-ten singles ==
Key

Symbol	Meaning
‡	Single peaked in 2023 but still in chart in 2024.
♦	Single entered chart in 2023 or 2024 but peaked in 2025.
(#)	Year-end top-ten single position and rank
Entered	The date that the single first appeared in the chart.
Peak	Highest position that the single reached in the UK Singles Chart.

Entered (week ending)	Weeks in top 10	Single	Artist	Peak	Peak reached (week ending)	Weeks at peak
Singles in 2023
13 July 2023	29	"Cruel Summer" ‡ ^{[A]}^{[B]}^{[O]}	Taylor Swift	2	14 September 2023	1
7 September 2023	22	"Prada" ‡ ^{[M]}	Cassö, Raye & D-Block Europe	2	19 October 2023	5
28 September 2023	20	"Greedy" ‡ ^{[I]}^{[N]}	Tate McRae	3	12 October 2023	4
12 October 2023	12	"Water" ‡ ^{[Q]}	Tyla	4	26 October 2023	1
2 November 2023	24	"Stick Season" (#1) ^{[U]}	Noah Kahan	1	11 January 2024	7
23 November 2023	12	"Lovin on Me" ‡ ^{[L]}	Jack Harlow	1	23 November 2023	3
23 November 2023	7	"Houdini" ‡ ^{[P]}	Dua Lipa	2	23 November 2023	1
7 December 2023	10	"Last Christmas" ‡ ^{[C]}^{[TT]}	Wham!	1	14 December 2023	7
7 December 2023	10	"All I Want for Christmas Is You" ‡ ^{[D]}^{[UU]}	Mariah Carey	2	14 December 2023	2
14 December 2023	7	"Fairytale of New York" ‡ ^{[E]}^{[AAA]}	The Pogues featuring Kirsty MacColl	4	14 December 2023	1
14 December 2023	8	"Rockin' Around the Christmas Tree" ♦ ^{[F]}^{[WW]}	Brenda Lee	4	2 January 2025	1
14 December 2023	5	"Merry Christmas" ^{[G]}^{[YY]}	Ed Sheeran & Elton John	4	4 January 2024	1
14 December 2023	4	"It's Beginning to Look a Lot Like Christmas" ^{[H]}	Michael Bublé	7	4 January 2024	1
21 December 2023	3	"You're Christmas to Me" ‡	Sam Ryder	2	28 December 2023	2
Singles in 2024
4 January 2024	4	"Santa Tell Me" ^{[J]}^{[BBB]}	Ariana Grande	8	4 January 2024	2
4 January 2024	1	"It's the Most Wonderful Time of the Year" ^{[K]}	Andy Williams	9	4 January 2024	1
11 January 2024	7	"Murder on the Dancefloor" ^{[R]}	Sophie Ellis-Bextor	2	18 January 2024	5
11 January 2024	2	"DNA (Loving You)"	Billy Gillies featuring Hannah Boleyn	9	11 January 2024	1
11 January 2024	1	"Rich Baby Daddy"	Drake featuring Sexyy Red & SZA	10	11 January 2024	1
18 January 2024	18	"Lose Control" (#4)	Teddy Swims	2	7 March 2024	2
25 January 2024	9	"Yes, And?" ^{[S]}	Ariana Grande	2	25 January 2024	1
1 February 2024	2	"Homesick"	Noah Kahan & Sam Fender	5	1 February 2024	1
8 February 2024	1	"Popular"	The Weeknd, Playboi Carti & Madonna	10	8 February 2024	1
15 February 2024	34	"Beautiful Things" (#2) ^{[UUU]}^{[BBBB]}	Benson Boone	1	28 March 2024	2
15 February 2024	5	"Praise Jah in the Moonlight"	YG Marley	5	22 February 2024	1
22 February 2024	11	"Texas Hold 'Em"	Beyoncé	1	29 February 2024	5
29 February 2024	5	"Training Season"	Dua Lipa	4	29 February 2024	1
7 March 2024	7	"End of Beginning"	Djo	4	14 March 2024	2
7 March 2024	4	"Carnival"	¥$ featuring Rich the Kid & Playboi Carti	5	14 March 2024	1
14 March 2024	1	"Alibi"	Ella Henderson featuring Rudimental	10	14 March 2024	1
21 March 2024	6	"We Can't Be Friends (Wait for Your Love)"	Ariana Grande	2	28 March 2024	1
28 March 2024	3	"Scared to Start" ^{[T]}	Michael Marcagi	9	4 April 2024	2
4 April 2024	2	"Like That"	Future, Metro Boomin & Kendrick Lamar	6	4 April 2024	1
4 April 2024	9	"Too Sweet" (#5)	Hozier	1	18 April 2024	2
4 April 2024	1	"Obsessed"	Olivia Rodrigo	10	4 April 2024	1
11 April 2024	7	"I Like the Way You Kiss Me"	Artemas	3	25 April 2024	1
11 April 2024	1	"Jolene"	Beyoncé	8	11 April 2024	1
11 April 2024	1	"II Most Wanted"	Beyoncé & Miley Cyrus	9	11 April 2024	1
18 April 2024	21	"Austin" (#9)	Dasha	5	8 August 2024	1
25 April 2024	23	"Espresso" (#3) ^{[GG]}	Sabrina Carpenter	1	9 May 2024	7
25 April 2024	1	"Illusion"	Dua Lipa	9	25 April 2024	1
25 April 2024	1	"Forget About Us"	Perrie	10	25 April 2024	1
2 May 2024	5	"Fortnight" ^{[W]}	Taylor Swift featuring Post Malone	1	2 May 2024	1
2 May 2024	1	"The Tortured Poets Department"	Taylor Swift	3	2 May 2024	1
2 May 2024	2	"Down Bad"	Taylor Swift	4	2 May 2024	1
9 May 2024	13	"A Bar Song (Tipsy)" (#6) ^{[CC]}	Shaboozey	3	16 May 2024	7
9 May 2024	1	"I Can Do It with a Broken Heart"	Taylor Swift	8	9 May 2024	1
16 May 2024	6	"Million Dollar Baby" ^{[X]}	Tommy Richman	3	23 May 2024	1
16 May 2024	10	"Not Like Us" ♦ ^{[Z]}^{[BB]}^{[TTT]}	Kendrick Lamar	1	27 February 2025	2
23 May 2024	10	"I Had Some Help"	Post Malone featuring Morgan Wallen	2	23 May 2024	1
30 May 2024	4	"Lunch"	Billie Eilish	2	30 May 2024	2
30 May 2024	1	"Chihiro"	Billie Eilish	7	30 May 2024	1
30 May 2024	16	"Birds of a Feather" (#7)	Billie Eilish	2	1 August 2024	2
6 June 2024	5	"Band4Band" ^{[Y]}	Central Cee & Lil Baby	3	13 June 2024	1
6 June 2024	12	"Stargazing"	Myles Smith	4	8 August 2024	1
13 June 2024	10	"Houdini"	Eminem	1	13 June 2024	2
20 June 2024	17	"Please Please Please" (#10) ^{[FF]}^{[WWW]}	Sabrina Carpenter	1	27 June 2024	5
4 July 2024	16	"Good Luck, Babe!" (#8)	Chappell Roan	2	8 August 2024	6
25 July 2024	1	"Three Lions" ^{[AA]}	Baddiel & Skinner & The Lightning Seeds	8	25 July 2024	1
1 August 2024	3	"Who" ^{[OOO]}^{[QQQ]}	Jimin	4	1 August 2024	1
1 August 2024	2	"Angel of My Dreams" ^{[EE]}	Jade	7	1 August 2024	1
8 August 2024	11	"Kisses"	Bl3ss & CamrinWatsin featuring bbyclose	5	29 August 2024	1
15 August 2024	6	"Guess" ^{[JJ]}^{[LL]}	Charli XCX featuring Billie Eilish	1	15 August 2024	1
15 August 2024	3	"Apple"	Charli XCX	8	15 August 2024	2
15 August 2024	3	"Kehlani"	Jordan Adetunji	8	29 August 2024	1
22 August 2024	9	"Backbone"	Chase & Status & Stormzy	1	22 August 2024	2
29 August 2024	14	"Die with a Smile" ^{[LLL]}	Lady Gaga & Bruno Mars	2	24 October 2024	1
29 August 2024	10	"Hot to Go!" ^{[KK]}	Chappell Roan	4	21 November 2024	1
5 September 2024	11	"Taste" ^{[QQ]}	Sabrina Carpenter	1	5 September 2024	9
12 September 2024	1	"Live Forever" ^{[HH]}	Oasis	8	12 September 2024	1
12 September 2024	1	"Don't Look Back in Anger" ^{[II]}	Oasis	9	12 September 2024	1
19 September 2024	3	"The Emptiness Machine" ^{[SS]}	Linkin Park	4	19 September 2024	1
19 September 2024	9	"Somedays" ^{[MMM]}	Sonny Fodera, Jazzy & D.O.D.	5	24 October 2024	2
10 October 2024	2	"Timeless" ^{[SSS]}	The Weeknd & Playboi Carti	7	10 October 2024	2
17 October 2024	15	"Sailor Song" ^{[III]}	Gigi Perez	1	7 November 2024	1
24 October 2024	4	"I Love You, I'm Sorry"	Gracie Abrams	4	24 October 2024	3
24 October 2024	1	"Sympathy Is a Knife"	Charli XCX featuring Ariana Grande	7	24 October 2024	1
24 October 2024	5	"Thick of It"	KSI featuring Trippie Redd	6	14 November 2024	1
24 October 2024	6	"Bed Chem" ^{[PP]}^{[PPP]}	Sabrina Carpenter	6	21 November 2024	1
24 October 2024	2	"Move" ^{[RR]}	Adam Port & Stryv featuring Malachiii	10	24 October 2024	2
31 October 2024	16	"APT." ^{[GGG]}	Rosé & Bruno Mars	2	7 November 2024	7
31 October 2024	1	"Night Changes" ^{[NN]}	One Direction	6	31 October 2024	1
31 October 2024	1	"Story of My Life" ^{[OO]}	One Direction	9	31 October 2024	1
7 November 2024	14	"That's So True" ^{[FFF]}	Gracie Abrams	1	14 November 2024	8
7 November 2024	1	"Disease"	Lady Gaga	7	7 November 2024	1
7 November 2024	1	"Diet Pepsi"	Addison Rae	10	7 November 2024	1
14 November 2024	10	"The Door" ^{[JJJ]}	Teddy Swims	5	21 November 2024	2
21 November 2024	2	"Wildflower"	Billie Eilish	7	21 November 2024	1
21 November 2024	12	"Bad Dreams" ^{[KKK]}^{[RRR]}^{[XXX]}^{[YYY]}^{[ZZZ]}^{[AAAA]}	Teddy Swims	6	28 November 2024	1
28 November 2024	1	"People Watching"	Sam Fender	4	28 November 2024	1
28 November 2024	1	"2 Hands"	Tate McRae	8	28 November 2024	1
5 December 2024	1	"Squabble Up"	Kendrick Lamar	4	5 December 2024	1
5 December 2024	4	"Luther" ♦ ^{[VVV]}	Kendrick Lamar & SZA	4	27 February 2025	1
5 December 2024	1	"TV Off"	Kendrick Lamar featuring Lefty Gunplay	6	5 December 2024	1
5 December 2024	4	"Defying Gravity" ^{[MMM]}	Cynthia Erivo featuring Ariana Grande	7	5 December 2024	2
12 December 2024	2	"Do They Know It's Christmas?" ^{[XX]}^{[EEE]}	Band Aid	8	12 December 2024	1
12 December 2024	4	"Jingle Bell Rock" ♦ ^{[ZZ]}	Bobby Helms	5	2 January 2025	1
19 December 2024	3	"It Can't Be Christmas" ♦	Tom Grennan	3	2 January 2025	1
19 December 2024	2	"Underneath the Tree" ♦ ^{[CCC]}^{[DDD]}	Kelly Clarkson	7	2 January 2025	1
26 December 2024	11	"Messy" ♦ ^{[HHH]}	Lola Young	1	30 January 2025	4

== Entries by artist ==
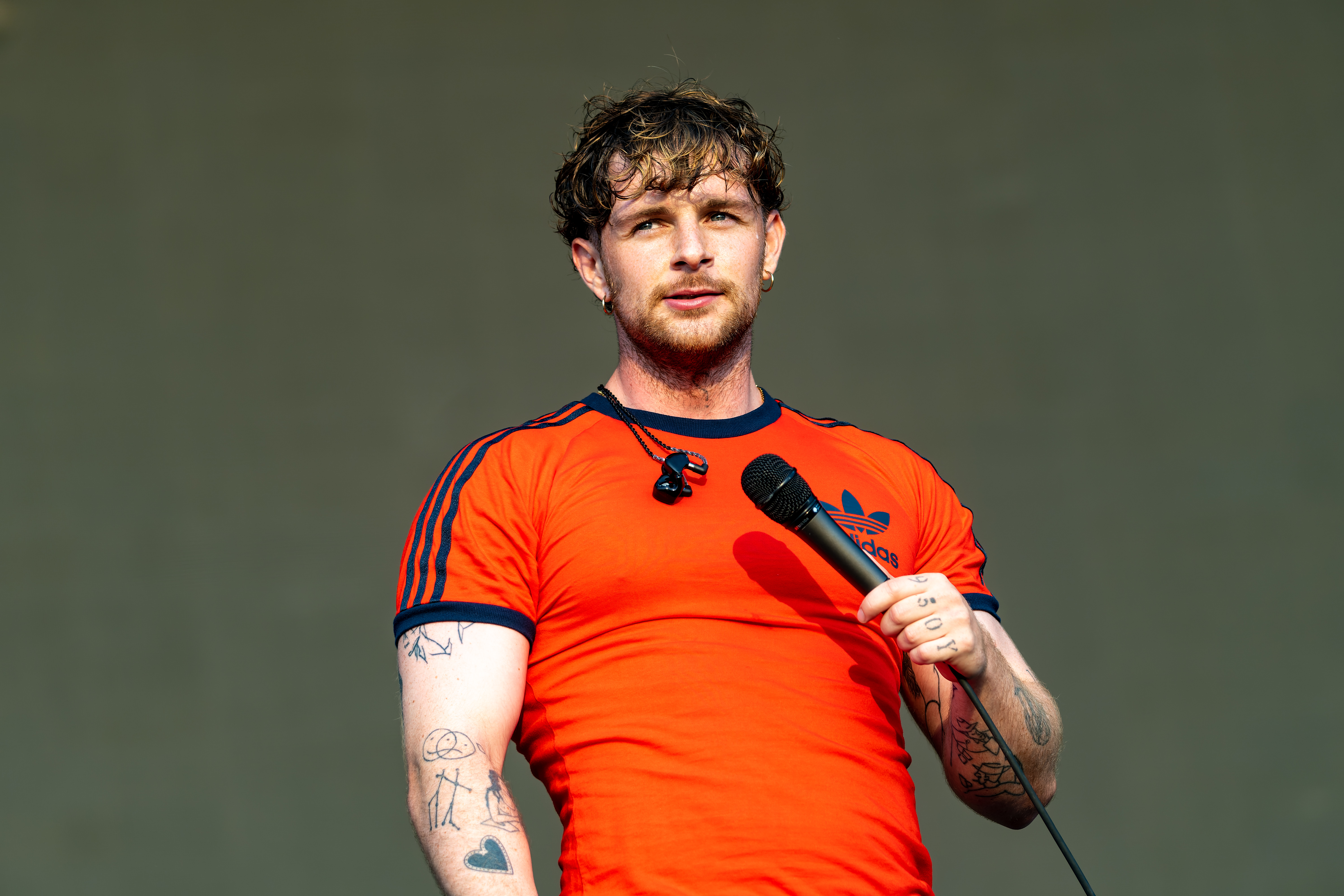
Tom Grennan secured his highest-charting UK single in December 2024 with the Amazon Music exclusive "It Can't Be Christmas", which peaked at number three.

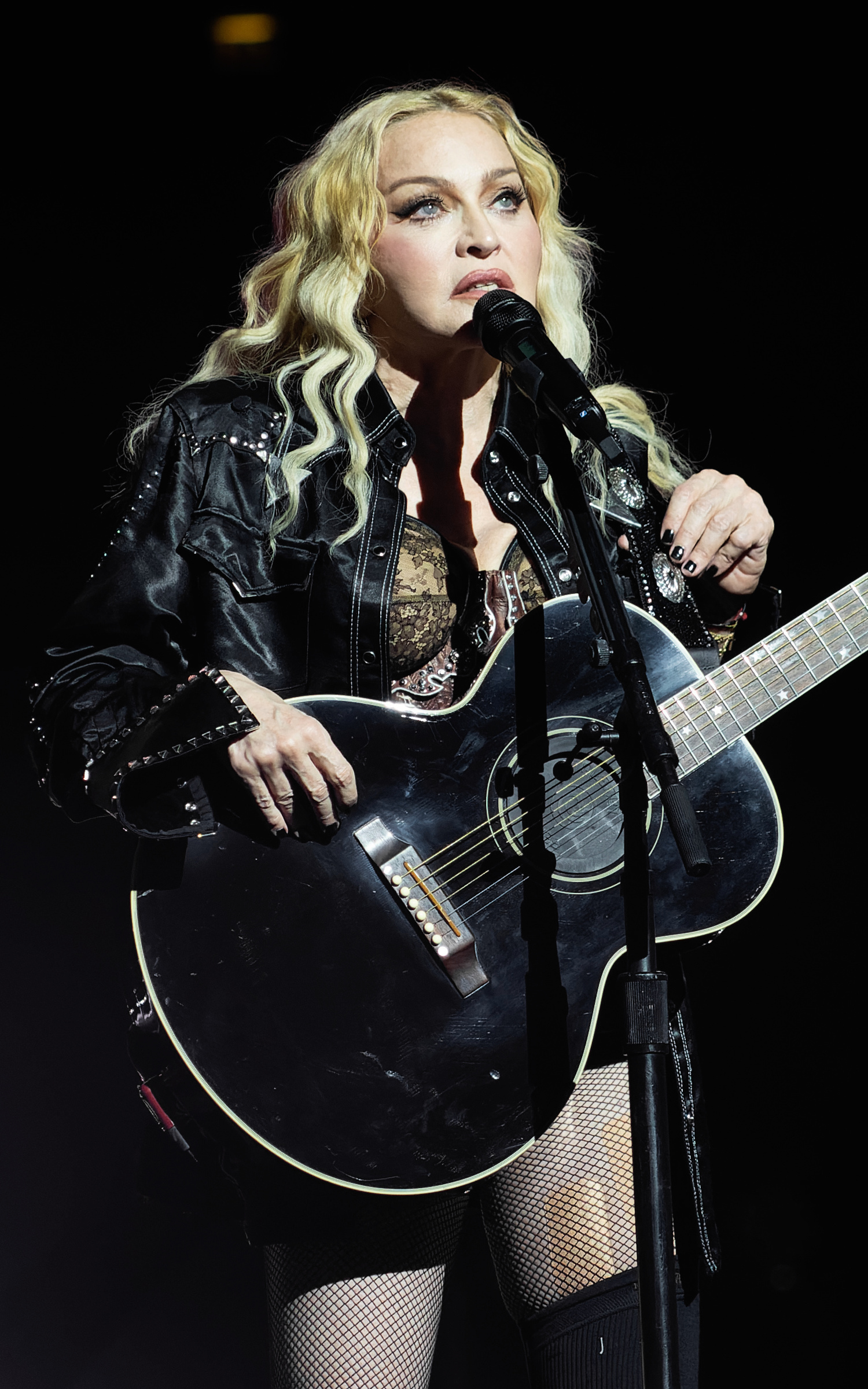
Madonna earned her 64th top-ten single in February of this year with "Popular", which peaked at number ten and became her first UK top-ten entry since September 2009.

The following table shows artists who achieved two or more top 10 entries in 2024, including singles that reached their peak in 2023. The figures include both main artists and featured artists, while appearances on ensemble charity records are also counted for each artist. The total number of weeks an artist spent in the top ten in 2024 is also shown.

Entries	Artist	Weeks	Singles
5	Ariana Grande ^{[MM]}	20	"Santa Tell Me", "Yes, And?", "We Can't Be Friends (Wait for Your Love)", "Sympathy Is a Knife", "Defying Gravity"
5	Billie Eilish ^{[DD]}	19	"Lunch", "Chihiro" "Birds of a Feather", "Guess", "Wildflower"
5	Taylor Swift	16	"Cruel Summer", "Fortnight", "The Tortured Poets Department", "Down Bad", "I Can Do It with a Broken Heart"
5	Kendrick Lamar	8	"Like That", "Not Like Us", "Squabble Up", "Luther", "TV Off"
4	Sabrina Carpenter	29	"Espresso", "Please Please Please", "Taste", "Bed Chem"
3	Teddy Swims	22	"Lose Control", "The Door", "Bad Dreams"
3	Beyoncé	11	"Texas Hold 'Em", "Jolene", "II Most Wanted"
3	Dua Lipa	10	"Houdini", "Training Season", "Illusion"
3	Charli XCX	7	"Guess", "Apple", "Sympathy Is a Knife"
3	Playboi Carti	6	"Popular", "Carnival", "Timeless"
2	Chappell Roan	21	"Good Luck, Babe!", "Hot to Go!"
2	Bruno Mars	18	"Die With a Smile", "APT."
2	Noah Kahan	15	"Stick Season", "Homesick"
2	Post Malone ^{[V]}	13	"Fortnight", "I Had Some Help"
2	Lady Gaga	11	"Die With a Smile", "Disease"
2	Gracie Abrams	10	"I Love You, I'm Sorry", "That's So True"
2	Tate McRae	9	"Greedy", "2 Hands"
2	George Michael ^{[VV]}	5	"Last Christmas", "Do They Know It's Christmas?"
2	Sam Fender	3	"Homesick", "People Watching"
2	The Weeknd	2	"Popular", "Timeless"
2	SZA	2	"Rich Baby Daddy", "Luther"
2	Oasis	1	"Live Forever", "Don't Look Back in Anger"
2	One Direction	1	"Night Changes", "Story of My Life"

== Notes ==
- ^{a} "Cruel Summer" re-entered the top 10 at number 3 on 2 November 2023 (week ending) following the release of a live version to tie in with the cinematic release of the film Taylor Swift: The Eras Tour.
- ^{b} "Cruel Summer" re-entered the top 10 at number 7 on 16 November 2023 (week ending).
- ^{c} "Last Christmas" re-entered the top 10 at number 5 on 7 December 2023 (week ending). The song originally peaked at number 2 upon its initial release in 1984 and reached number-one for the first time ever on 7 January 2021 (week ending).
- ^{d} "All I Want for Christmas Is You" re-entered the top 10 at number 6 on 7 December 2023 (week ending). The song originally peaked at number 2 upon its initial release in 1994 and reached number-one for the first time ever on 17 December 2020 (week ending).
- ^{e} "Fairytale of New York" re-entered the top 10 at number 4 on 14 December 2023 (week ending), following the death of The Pogues' lead singer Shane MacGowan. The song originally peaked at number 2 upon release in 1987.
- ^{f} "Rockin' Around the Christmas Tree" re-entered the top 10 at number 6 on 14 December 2023 (week ending). Having originally peaked at number 6 upon its original release in 1962, the song reached a new peak of number 4 on 5 January 2023 (week ending).
- ^{g} "Merry Christmas" re-entered the top 10 at number 7 on 14 December 2023 (week ending), having originally peaked at number-one upon release in 2021.
- ^{h} "It's Beginning to Look a Lot Like Christmas" re-entered the top 10 at number 8 on 14 December 2023 (week ending).
- ^{i} "Greedy" re-entered the top 10 at number 9 on 21 December 2023 (week ending), following the release of the album Think Later.
- ^{j} "Santa Tell Me" entered the top 10 for the first time at number 8 on 4 January 2024 (week ending). The song first charted at number 79 in 2014, and later peaked at number 11 in 2020.
- ^{k} "It's the Most Wonderful Time of the Year" re-entered the top 10 at number 9 on 4 January 2024 (week ending). The song first charted at number 21 in 2007, and reached the top 10 for the first time on 6 January 2022 (week ending), peaking at number 9.
- ^{l} "Lovin on Me" re-entered the top 10 at number 2 on 11 January 2024 (week ending).
- ^{m} "Prada" re-entered the top 10 at number 3 on 11 January 2024 (week ending).
- ^{n} "Greedy" re-entered the top 10 at number 4 on 11 January 2024 (week ending).
- ^{o} "Cruel Summer" re-entered the top 10 at number 5 on 11 January 2024 (week ending).
- ^{p} "Houdini" re-entered the top 10 at number 6 on 11 January 2024 (week ending).
- ^{q} "Water" re-entered the top 10 at number 7 on 11 January 2024 (week ending).
- ^{r} "Murder on the Dancefloor" originally peaked at number 2 upon its initial release in 2001. The song re-entered the top 10 at number 8 on 11 January 2024 (week ending) after experiencing renewed popularity due to featuring prominently in the final scene of the film Saltburn.
- ^{s} "Yes, And?" re-entered the top 10 at number 6 on 21 March 2024 (week ending), following the release of the album Eternal Sunshine.
- ^{t} "Scared to Start" re-entered the top 10 at number 9 on 18 April 2024 (week ending).
- ^{u} "Stick Season" re-entered the top 10 at number 10 on 18 April 2024 (week ending).
- ^{v} Figure includes a feature on "Fortnight".
- ^{w} "Fortnight" re-entered the top 10 at number 10 on 27 June 2024 (week ending).
- ^{x} "Million Dollar Baby" re-entered the top 10 at number 10 on 4 July 2024 (week ending).
- ^{y} "Band4Band" re-entered the top 10 at number 10 on 11 July 2024 (week ending).
- ^{z} "Not Like Us" re-entered the top 10 at number 9 on 18 July 2024 (week ending), following the release of its music video.
- ^{aa} "Three Lions" originally peaked at number-one upon its initial release in 1996. It had further spells in the top 10 in 2006, 2010 and 2021, and another spell at number-one in 2018. It re-entered the top 10 at number 8 on 25 July 2024 (week ending), following England's defeat to Spain in the final of Euro 2024.
- ^{bb} "Not Like Us" re-entered the top 10 at number 10 on 1 August 2024 (week ending).
- ^{cc} "A Bar Song (Tipsy)" re-entered the top 10 at number 10 on 8 August 2024 (week ending).
- ^{dd} Figure includes a feature on "Guess".
- ^{ee} "Angel of My Dreams" re-entered the top 10 at number 10 on 22 August 2024 (week ending).
- ^{ff} "Please Please Please" re-entered the top 10 at number 2 on 5 September 2024 (week ending) following the release of the album Short n' Sweet.
- ^{gg} "Espresso" re-entered the top 10 at number 3 on 5 September 2024 (week ending) following the release of the album Short n' Sweet.
- ^{hh} "Live Forever" originally peaked at number 10 upon its initial release in 1994. The song re-entered the top 10 at its brand new peak of number 8 on 12 September 2024 (week ending), following Oasis' announcement that they would reform for performances in the UK and Ireland in July and August 2025 during their Oasis Live '25 Tour.
- ^{ii} "Don't Look Back in Anger" originally peaked at number-one upon its initial release in 1996. The song re-entered the top 10 at number 9 on 12 September 2024 (week ending), following Oasis' announcement that they would reform for performances in the UK and Ireland in July and August 2025 during their Oasis Live '25 Tour.
- ^{jj} "Guess" re-entered the top 10 at number 9 on 19 September 2024 (week ending).
- ^{kk} "Hot to Go!" re-entered the top 10 at number 9 on 26 September 2024 (week ending).
- ^{ll} "Guess" re-entered the top 10 at number 10 on 3 October 2024 (week ending).
- ^{mm} Figure includes features on "Sympathy Is a Knife" and "Defying Gravity".
- ^{nn} "Night Changes" originally peaked at number 7 upon its initial release in 2014. Following Liam Payne's death on 16 October 2024, the song re-entered the top 10 at its brand new peak of number 6 on 25 October 2024 (31 October 2024, week ending).
- ^{oo} "Story of My Life" originally peaked at number 2 upon its initial release in 2013. Following Liam Payne's death on 16 October 2024, the song re-entered the top 10 at number 9 on 25 October 2024 (31 October 2024, week ending).
- ^{pp} "Bed Chem" re-entered the top 10 at number 9 on 7 November 2024 (week ending).
- ^{qq} "Taste" re-entered the top 10 at number 9 on 14 November 2024 (week ending).
- ^{rr} "Move" re-entered the top 10 at number 10 on 14 November 2024 (week ending).
- ^{ss} "The Emptiness Machine" re-entered the top 10 at number 10 on 28 November 2024 (week ending), following the release of the album From Zero.
- ^{tt} "Last Christmas" re-entered the top 10 at number 8 on 5 December 2024 (week ending).
- ^{uu} "All I Want for Christmas Is You" re-entered the top 10 at number 10 on 5 December 2024 (week ending).
- ^{vv} Figure includes an appearance on the "Do They Know It's Christmas?" charity single by Band Aid.
- ^{ww} "Rockin' Around the Christmas Tree" re-entered the top 10 at number 6 on 12 December 2024 (week ending).
- ^{xx} "Do They Know It's Christmas" re-entered the top 10 at number 8 on 12 December 2024 (week ending) following the release of its 2024 Ultimate Mix. The song originally peaked at number-one upon release in 1984.
- ^{yy} "Merry Christmas" re-entered the top 10 at number 9 on 12 December 2024 (week ending).
- ^{zz} "Jingle Bell Rock" re-entered the top 10 at number 10 on 12 December 2024 (week ending). The song entered the top 10 for the first time ever on 5 January 2023 (week ending), where it peaked at number 7. It reached a new peak of number 5 on 2 January 2025 (week ending).
- ^{aaa} "Fairytale of New York" re-entered the top 10 at number 8 on 19 December 2024 (week ending).
- ^{bbb} "Santa Tell Me" re-entered the top 10 at number 9 on 19 December 2024 (week ending).
- ^{ccc} "Underneath the Tree" entered the top 10 for the first time at number 10 on 19 December 2024 (week ending). The song first charted at number 30 in 2014, and later peaked at number 12 in 2022.
- ^{ddd} "Underneath the Tree" re-entered the top 10 at its new peak of number 7 on 2 January 2025 (week ending).
- ^{eee} "Do They Know It's Christmas" re-entered the top 10 at number 9 on 2 January 2025 (week ending).
- ^{fff} "That's So True" re-entered the top 10 at number-one on 9 January 2025 (week ending).
- ^{ggg} "APT." re-entered the top 10 at number 2 on 9 January 2025 (week ending).
- ^{hhh} "Messy" re-entered the top 10 at number 3 on 9 January 2025 (week ending).
- ^{iii} "Sailor Song" re-entered the top 10 at number 4 on 9 January 2025 (week ending).
- ^{jjj} "The Door" re-entered the top 10 at number 6 on 9 January 2025 (week ending).
- ^{kkk} "Bad Dreams" re-entered the top 10 at number 7 on 9 January 2025 (week ending).
- ^{lll} "Die with a Smile" re-entered the top 10 at number 8 on 9 January 2025 (week ending).
- ^{mmm} "Somedays" re-entered the top 10 at number 9 on 9 January 2025 (week ending).
- ^{nnn} "Defying Gravity" re-entered the top 10 at number 10 on 9 January 2025 (week ending).
- ^{ooo} "Who" re-entered the top 10 at number 5 on 16 January 2025 (week ending).
- ^{ppp} "Bed Chem" re-entered the top 10 at number 10 on 23 January 2025 (week ending).
- ^{qqq} "Who" re-entered the top 10 at number 7 on 30 January 2025 (week ending).
- ^{rrr} "Bad Dreams" re-entered the top 10 at number 9 on 6 February 2025 (week ending), following the release of the album I've Tried Everything but Therapy (Part 2).
- ^{sss} "Timeless" re-entered the top 10 at number 7 on 13 February 2025 (week ending), following the release of the album Hurry Up Tomorrow.
- ^{ttt} "Not Like Us" re-entered the top 10 at number 2 on 20 February 2025 (week ending), following Kendrick Lamar's performance at the Super Bowl LIX halftime show.
- ^{uuu} "Beautiful Things" re-entered the top 10 at number 6 on 20 February 2025 (week ending).
- ^{vvv} "Luther" re-entered the top 10 at number 10 on 20 February 2025 (week ending), following Kendrick Lamar's performance at the Super Bowl LIX halftime show.
- ^{www} "Please Please Please" re-entered the top 10 at number 9 on 27 February 2025 (week ending) following the release of the subsequent remix featuring Dolly Parton and the release of the deluxe edition of the album Short n' Sweet.
- ^{xxx} "Bad Dreams" re-entered the top 10 at number 10 on 13 March 2025 (week ending), following Teddy Swims' performance at the Brit Awards 2025.
- ^{yyy} "Bad Dreams" re-entered the top 10 at number 9 on 3 April 2025 (week ending).
- ^{zzz} "Bad Dreams" re-entered the top 10 at number 9 on 24 April 2025 (week ending).
- ^{aaaa} "Bad Dreams" re-entered the top 10 at number 9 on 22 May 2025 (week ending).
- ^{bbbb} "Beautiful Things" re-entered the top 10 at number 10 on 21 August 2025 (week ending).
