= List of top 10 singles in 2023 (Ireland) =

This is a list of singles that have peaked in the top 10 of the Irish Singles Chart in 2023, as compiled by the Official Charts Company on behalf of the Irish Recorded Music Association.

== Top-ten singles ==
Key

| Symbol | Meaning |
|---|---|
| ◁ | Indicates single's top 10 entry was also its Irish Singles Chart top 100 debut |

| Artist(s) | Single | Peak | Peak date | Weeks at #1 | Ref. |
|---|---|---|---|---|---|
| SZA | "Kill Bill" ◁ | 3 | 6 January | - | |
| Central Cee | "Let Go" ◁ | 8 | 6 January | - | |
| Cian Ducrot | "I'll Be Waiting" | 6 | 13 January | - | |
| Miley Cyrus | "Flowers" ◁ | 1 | 20 January | 10 | |
| Metro Boomin, The Weeknd and 21 Savage | "Creepin'" | 8 | 20 January | - | |
| Rema | "Calm Down" | 5 | 27 January | - | |
| Tiësto and Tate McRae | "10:35" | 5 | 10 February | - | |
| Miguel | "Sure Thing" | 6 | 17 February | - | |
| Coi Leray | "Players" | 7 | 17 February | - | |
| PinkPantheress | "Boy's a Liar" | 2 | 24 February | - | |
| Niall Horan | "Heaven" ◁ | 4 | 24 February | - | |
| The Weeknd | "Die for You" | 3 | 10 March | - | |
| Hozier | "Eat Your Young" ◁ | 7 | 24 March | - | |
| Taylor Swift | "All of the Girls You Loved Before" ◁ | 9 | 24 March | - | |
| Lizzy McAlpine | "Ceilings" | 3 | 31 March | - | |
| Calvin Harris and Ellie Goulding | "Miracle" ◁ | 1 | 31 March | 7 | |
| Ed Sheeran | "Eyes Closed" ◁ | 4 | 31 March | - | |
| Mae Stephens | "If We Ever Broke Up" | 8 | 7 April | - | |
| Libianca | "People" | 2 | 14 April | - | |
| Drake | "Search & Rescue" ◁ | 6 | 14 April | - | |
| David Kushner | "Daylight" ◁ | 2 | 21 April | - | |
| Morgan Wallen | "Last Night" | 7 | 28 April | - | |
| Lewis Capaldi | "Wish You the Best" ◁ | 4 | 28 April | - | |
| Jazzy | "Giving Me" | 1 | 19 May | 3 | |
| Loreen | "Tattoo" | 3 | 19 May | - | |
| Käärijä | "Cha Cha Cha" ◁ | 7 | 19 May | - | |
| Lana Del Rey | "Say Yes to Heaven" ◁ | 8 | 26 May | - | |
| Taylor Swift | "Karma" | 8 | 2 June | - | |
| Switch Disco and Ella Henderson | "React" | 4 | 9 June | - | |
| Dave and Central Cee | "Sprinter" ◁ | 1 | 9 June | 7 | |
| David Guetta, Anne-Marie and Coi Leray | "Baby Don't Hurt Me" | 10 | 9 June | - | |
| Harry Styles | "Satellite" | 6 | 16 June | - | |
| J Hus featuring Drake | "Who Told You" ◁ | 4 | 23 June | - | |
| Peggy Gou | "(It Goes Like) Nanana" ◁ | 3 | 30 June | - | |
| Dermot Kennedy | "Don't Forget Me" | 9 | 30 June | - | |
| Kylie Minogue | "Padam Padam" | 7 | 7 July | - | |
| Olivia Rodrigo | "Vampire" ◁ | 1 | 7 July | 1 | |
| Anne-Marie and Shania Twain | "Unhealthy" | 10 | 7 July | - | |
| Taylor Swift | "I Can See You" ◁ | 4 | 14 July | - | |
| Taylor Swift | "Enchanted (Taylor's Version)" ◁ | 8 | 14 July | - | |
| Taylor Swift | "Mine (Taylor's Version)" ◁ | 9 | 14 July | - | |
| Hannah Laing and RoRo | "Good Love" | 4 | 21 July | - | |
| Jung Kook featuring Latto | "Seven" ◁ | 7 | 21 July | - | |
| Troye Sivan | "Rush" ◁ | 8 | 21 July | - | |
| Gunna | "FukUMean" | 9 | 21 July | - | |
| Nicki Minaj, Ice Spice and Aqua | "Barbie World" | 6 | 28 July | - | |
| Billie Eilish | "What Was I Made For?" ◁ | 1 | 4 August | 2 | |
| Sinéad O'Connor | "Nothing Compares 2 U" | 7 | 4 August | - | |
| Travis Scott featuring Drake | "Meltdown" ◁ | 10 | 4 August | - | |
| Charli XCX | "Speed Drive" | 7 | 11 August | - | |
| Ryan Gosling | "I'm Just Ken" | 10 | 11 August | - | |
| Dua Lipa | "Dance the Night" | 1 | 18 August | 2 | |
| Olivia Rodrigo | "Bad Idea Right?" ◁ | 4 | 18 August | - | |
| Doja Cat | "Paint the Town Red" | 1 | 1 September | 3 | |
| Miley Cyrus | "Used to Be Young" ◁ | 7 | 1 September | - | |
| Oliver Anthony Music | "Rich Men North of Richmond" | 10 | 1 September | - | |
| Calvin Harris and Sam Smith | "Desire" | 7 | 8 September | - | |
| Fred Again | "Delilah (Pull Me Out of This)" | 8 | 8 September | - | |
| Fred Again | "Adore U" ◁ | 1 | 15 September | 1 | |
| Olivia Rodrigo | "Get Him Back!" ◁ | 5 | 15 September | - | |
| Olivia Rodrigo | "The Grudge" ◁ | 6 | 15 September | - | |
| Cassö, Raye and D-Block Europe | "Prada" | 1 | 29 September | 6 | |
| Tom Odell | "Black Friday" ◁ | 6 | 29 September | - | |
| Tate McRae | "Greedy" ◁ | 2 | 6 October | - | |
| Kenya Grace | "Strangers" | 3 | 6 October | - | |
| Chasing Abbey | "Oh My Johnny (Banks of the Roses)" | 6 | 6 October | - | |
| Drake featuring J. Cole | "First Person Shooter" ◁ | 7 | 13 October | - | |
| Drake featuring Yeat | "IDGAF" ◁ | 9 | 13 October | - | |
| Drake | "Virginia Beach" ◁ | 10 | 13 October | - | |
| Zach Bryan featuring Kacey Musgraves | "I Remember Everything" | 5 | 20 October | - | |
| Tyla | "Water" | 6 | 20 October | - | |
| Zach Bryan | "Something in the Orange" | 7 | 20 October | - | |
| Mitski | "My Love Mine All Mine" | 8 | 20 October | - | |
| Sonny Fodera and MK featuring Clementine Douglas | "Asking" | 9 | 20 October | - | |
| Billy Gillies featuring Hannah Boleyn | "DNA (Loving You)" | 8 | 27 October | - | |
| Taylor Swift | "Cruel Summer" | 4 | 27 October | - | |
| Troye Sivan | "One of Your Girls" | 9 | 27 October | - | |
| Taylor Swift | "Is It Over Now?" ◁ | 2 | 3 November | - | |
| Taylor Swift | "Now That We Don't Talk" ◁ | 4 | 3 November | - | |
| Taylor Swift | "Slut!" ◁ | 6 | 3 November | - | |
| Noah Kahan | "Stick Season" | 1 | 10 November | 14 | |
| The Beatles | "Now and Then" ◁ | 4 | 10 November | - | |
| Noah Kahan featuring Hozier | "Northern Attitude" ◁ | 5 | 17 November | - | |
| Dua Lipa | "Houdini" ◁ | 6 | 17 November | - | |
| Jack Harlow | "Lovin on Me" ◁ | 2 | 1 December | - | |
| Olivia Rodrigo | "Can't Catch Me Now" | 5 | 1 December | - | |
| The Pogues featuring Kirsty MacColl | "Fairytale of New York" | 1 | 8 December | 1 | |
| Dean Martin | "Let It Snow! Let It Snow! Let It Snow!" | 10 | 29 December | - | |

== Entries by artist ==
The following table shows artists who achieved two or more top 10 entries in 2023. The figures include both main artists and featured artists and the peak position in brackets.

| Entries | Artist | Songs |
|---|---|---|
| 9 | Taylor Swift | "All of the Girls You Loved Before" (9), "Karma" (8), "I Can See You" (4), Enchanted (Taylor's Version)" (8), "Mine (Taylor's Version)" (9), "Cruel Summer" (4), "Is It Over Now?" (2), "Now That We Don't Talk" (4), "Slut!" (6) |
| 6 | Drake | "Search & Rescue" (6), "Who Told You" (4), "Meltdown" (10), "First Person Shooter" (7), IDGAF" (9), "Virginia Beach" (10) |
| 5 | Olivia Rodrigo | "Vampire" (1), "Bad Idea Right?" (4), "Get Him Back!" (5), The Grudge" (6), "Can't Catch Me Now" (5) |
| 2 | Miley Cyrus | "Flowers" (1), "Used to Be Young" (7) |
| 2 | The Weeknd | "Creepin'" (8), "Die for You" (3) |
| 2 | Tate McRae | "10:35" (5), "Greedy" (2) |
| 2 | Coi Leray | "Players" (7), "Baby Don't Hurt Me" (10) |
| 2 | Calvin Harris | "Miracle" (1), "Desire" (7) |
| 2 | Hozier | "Eat Your Young" (7), "Northern Attitude" (5) |
| 2 | Anne-Marie | "Baby Don't Hurt Me" (10), "Unhealthy" (10) |
| 2 | Dua Lipa | "Dance the Night" (1), "Houdini" (6) |
| 2 | Troye Sivan | "Rush" (8), "One of Your Girls" (9) |
| 2 | Fred Again | "Adore U" (1), "Delilah (Pull Me Out of This)" (8) |
| 2 | Zach Bryan | "I Remember Everything" (5), "Something in the Orange" (7) |
| 2 | Noah Kahan | "Stick Season" (1), "Northern Attitude" (5) |

== See also ==
- 2023 in music
- List of number-one singles of 2023 (Ireland)
