= Kimcote and Walton =

Civil parish in Leicestershire, England

Coordinates: 52.47436°N 1.13313°W

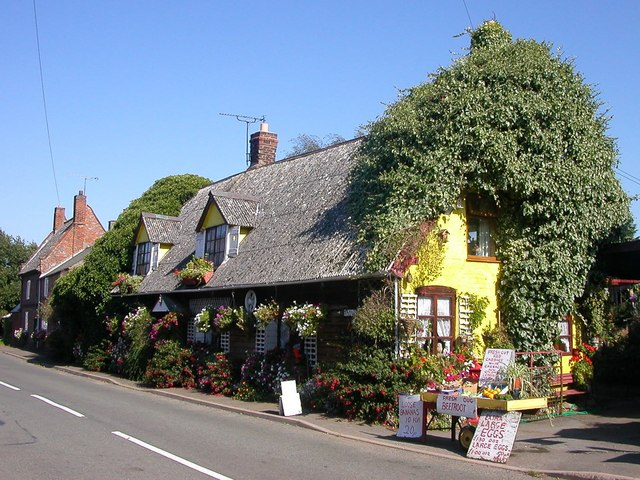
- Farm shop in Walton, now closed.

- Location within Leicestershire
- Population: 600 (2011)
- OS grid reference: SP589866
- Civil parish: Kimcote and Walton
- District: Harborough
- Shire county: Leicestershire
- Region: East Midlands
- Country: England
- Sovereign state: United Kingdom
- Post town: LEICESTER
- Postcode district: LE17
- Police: Leicestershire
- Fire: Leicestershire
- Ambulance: East Midlands
- UK Parliament: Harborough

Kimcote and Walton is a civil parish situated in the Harborough district, in Leicestershire, England, approximately 4 miles north east of Lutterworth. The population of the civil parish at the 2011 census was 600. The parish includes the villages of Kimcote and Walton (historically also known as Walton in Knaptoft). All Saints Parish Church is situated in Kimcote. Walton once had a church but it was defunct in about 1630. Walton still has a Baptist Chapel and a public house, the Dog and Gun, which reopened in 2024 under new ownership.

The parish was created in 1898 from the merger of the civil parishes of Kimcote and Walton in Knaptoft.

The parish was the base for many stockingers during the 19th century.

Hannah Boleyn, who co-wrote and performed the top 10 single DNA (Loving You) with Billy Gillies, is from Kimcote.
