= Walton, Leicestershire =

Village in Leicestershire, England

Coordinates: 52.479°N 1.125°W

Walton
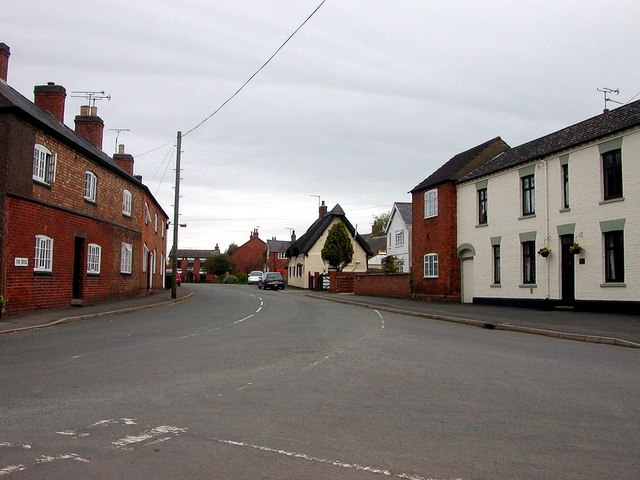

- Location within Leicestershire
- Civil parish: Kimcote and Walton
- District: Harborough
- Shire county: Leicestershire
- Region: East Midlands
- Country: England
- Sovereign state: United Kingdom
- Police: Leicestershire
- Fire: Leicestershire
- Ambulance: East Midlands

Walton is a village in the civil parish of Kimcote and Walton, in the Harborough district, in the county of Leicestershire, England, south of Leicester and west of Market Harborough. The village has a pub named The Dog and Gun.

According to the local population the Village is supposedly haunted by at least 4 ghosts. Including the appearance of the hanging body of a local person, that has been spotted by motorists driving out of the village at night, in one of the large trees on the roadside. Also the village's pub, the Dog and Gun, is supposedly haunted by the spirit of a dog who has been spotted by many pub-goers walking around the bar.

Walton was historically a hamlet in the ancient parish of Knaptoft, and was known as Walton in Knaptoft. It became a separate civil parish in 1866. The parish was abolished on 31 March 1898 and merged with Kimcote to form the civil parish of "Kimcote and Walton". In 1881 the parish had a population of 208.
