= I Can Do It with a Broken Heart =

2024 single by Taylor Swift

Single by Taylor Swift

from the album The Tortured Poets Department
- Released: July 2, 2024
- Studio: Conway Recording (Los Angeles); Electric Lady (New York)
- Genre: Electropop; dance-pop; new wave; synth-disco
- Length: 3:38
- Label: Republic
- Songwriters: Taylor Swift; Jack Antonoff
- Producers: Taylor Swift; Jack Antonoff

Taylor Swift singles chronology
"Fortnight" (2024)	"I Can Do It with a Broken Heart" (2024)	"The Fate of Ophelia" (2025)

Music video
- "I Can Do It with a Broken Heart" on YouTube

"I Can Do It with a Broken Heart" is a song by the American singer-songwriter Taylor Swift from her eleventh studio album, The Tortured Poets Department (2024). Republic Records released it as the album's second and final single on July 2, 2024. Written and produced by Swift and Jack Antonoff, "I Can Do It with a Broken Heart" depicts Swift's concealment of depression and heartbreak caused by romantic failures to perform for the Eras Tour. Contrary to the melancholic sentiments of the lyrics, the music is upbeat electropop, dance-pop, new wave, and synth-disco, featuring salient synth arpeggios and throbbing pulses over a frantic tempo and rhythmic arrangement.

Music critics highlighted the contrast between the sanguine production and melancholic lyricism of "I Can Do It with a Broken Heart", deeming it a musical standout on the album; USA Today named it the best song of 2024. It peaked at number five on the Billboard Global 200 and within the top 10 in Australia, Canada, Ireland, New Zealand, the Philippines, Singapore, and the United Kingdom. In the United States, it reached number three on the Billboard Hot 100 and became the album's longest-charting song. The track received platinum or higher certifications in Australia, Brazil, New Zealand, and the United Kingdom.

Swift included the song in the revamped set list for the Eras Tour in 2024; its performance was accompanied by a pantomime skit inspired by the silent films of the Golden Age of Hollywood. The accompanying music video is a compilation of footage from the Eras Tour and its rehearsals.

== Background and release ==
Swift started working on The Tortured Poets Department immediately after she submitted her tenth studio album, Midnights, to Republic Records for release in 2022. She continued working on it in secrecy throughout the US leg of the Eras Tour in 2023. The album's conception took place amidst media reports on Swift's broken relationship with the English actor Joe Alwyn and her short romantic linking with the English musician Matty Healy while she was on the early run of the Eras Tour. She described The Tortured Poets Department as a "lifeline" for her and an album which she "really needed" to make.

Republic Records released The Tortured Poets Department on April 19, 2024; "I Can Do It with a Broken Heart" is 13th on the track list. To celebrate the European leg of the Eras Tour tour, Universal Music Group released the song to Italian radio as the second single from the album on July 2, 2024. In the United States, Republic Records sent the song to pop radio stations on July 12, 2024. The track was released digitally on music streaming services on July 16, 2024; the cover artwork is a capture of Swift's performance of the song at the Eras Tour concert in Lyon, France, on June 2, 2024. A remix of "I Can Do It with a Broken Heart" by Dombresky was released on September 13.

The music video for the song was released on August 20, 2024, and premiered during the final show of the European leg of the Eras Tour. The video features a compilation of footage and behind-the-scenes clips of Swift preparing for the tour and was directed by Swift. It also includes rehearsals for the live performance of "I Can Do It with a Broken Heart", costume changes, and Swift entering a cleaning cart prop used to transport her onto the raised stage. The video also features the tour's choreographers, dancers, backing vocalists, and musicians.

== Music and lyrics ==
"I Can Do It with a Broken Heart"
"I Can Do It with a Broken Heart" is a dance-pop and electropop song with an upbeat production consisting of synth arpeggios, house elements, and dance beats.

Swift wrote and produced "I Can Do It with a Broken Heart" with Jack Antonoff. From a musical viewpoint, the song stands out on The Tortured Poets Department thanks to its upbeat and energetic sound, contrary to the album's predominantly ruminative and moody atmosphere. Set over a tempo of 130 beats per minute, the track incorporates electropop, dance-pop, synth-disco, and new wave, with elements of 1980s synth-pop. The production is driven by frantic, percolating synth arpeggios and sequences throughout. It features rhythmic programming of a synth bass that generates throbbing pulses, evoking house, bubblegum, and club music. The percussive arrangement is accompanied by swirls of keyboard sounds, played with a piano and a Korg M1. Critics compared the track's production to Swift's 2022 song "Mastermind" and the music of other artists such as Robyn, Vince Clarke, and Pet Shop Boys.

Despite its upbeat production, the lyrics are about romantic failures, in line with the overall theme of The Tortured Poets Department. The song is lyrically a "pep talk" to oneself about persevering in the face of being a famous performer despite personal heartbreak. Music journalists suggested "I Can Do It with a Broken Heart" discusses Swift's need to hide her negative emotions regarding the breakup while performing on her tour ("All the pieces of me shattered as the crowd was chanting 'more'."). Will Harris of Q wrote that the lyrics showcased "romantic confusion and heartbreak", pointing to the lyrics, "I'm so depressed, I act like it's my birthday every day/ I'm so obsessed with him, but he avoids me like the plague." According to The Wall Street Journal's Lindsay Ellis, the lyrics about concealing personal pain to show up at work resonate with many fans who felt burned out from hustle culture.

== Critical reception ==
Variety gave the song a positive review in its review of the parent album, considering it to be the album's climax and suggested it was "sure to be one of the most talked-about and replayed tracks". In a ranking of all 31 tracks of The Anthology edition of The Tortured Poets Department, Billboard ranked the song in eighth place, considering the song "rollicking, snarky and strikingly funny". Clash's Lauren Webb described the track as "triumphantly-erupting". Josh Kurp of Uproxx selected "I Can Do It with a Broken Heart" as one of the album's "strong songs", while Alex Hudson from Exclaim! opined that its production makes it the only track that stands out on the album. Jonathan Keefe of Slant Magazine opined that the song was a "viable radio [hit]".

Writing for The Guardian, Laura Snapes considered the lyric "lights, camera, bitch smile" to be "meme-worthy" and "makes clear why she wanted [her music] back on TikTok." In NME, Laura Molloy deemed "I Can Do It with a Broken Heart" "poised for internet virality than anything more substantial". Olivia Horn from Pitchfork similarly suggested that the lyrics were "versed in memespeak" and the music was too familiar to Swift and Antonoff's past collaborations. By contrast, Tom Breihan of Stereogum wrote that the song showcased "a musical energy and inventiveness" that suggested a new path for Swift's artistry, praising the vocals and keyboard instrumentation. Writing for Beats Per Minute, John Wohlmacher said the song is "so unabashedly unhinged and manic that it's pure joy". USA Today ranked "I Can Do It with a Broken Heart" the best song of 2024.

== Commercial performance ==
Following the album's release, its tracks occupied the top nine of the Billboard Global 200; "I Can Do It with a Broken Heart" debuted at its peak of number five on the chart, where it extended Swift's top-10 entries to 33. In the United States, the song opened and peaked at number three on the Billboard Hot 100. It, along with 13 tracks from the album, made Swift the first artist to monopolize the top 14 of the Hot 100. Following its release as a single, "I Can Do It with a Broken Heart" peaked at number four on Adult Pop Airplay and number six on Pop Airplay, marking Swift's record-extending 32nd top-ten song on the former and her 25th top-ten song on the latter. It also became the longest-running song from The Tortured Poets Department on the Billboard Hot 100, spending 31 weeks on the chart.

Elsewhere, "I Can Do It with a Broken Heart" reached the top 10 in Canada (4), Ireland (5), Singapore (5), New Zealand (6), the United Kingdom (8), and the Philippines (10). It also charted within the 20 in many countries: number 11 in Austria, number 12 in Latvia, number 14 in Malaysia and Portugal, number 15 in Belgium and Luxembourg, number 17 in Sweden, and number 19 in Croatia, Denmark, and South Africa. In Australia, it reached number five on the ARIA Singles Chart and made her the artist with the most entries in a single week with 29. The song has been certified diamond in Brazil, triple platinum in Australia, and platinum in New Zealand and the United Kingdom.

== Live performances ==
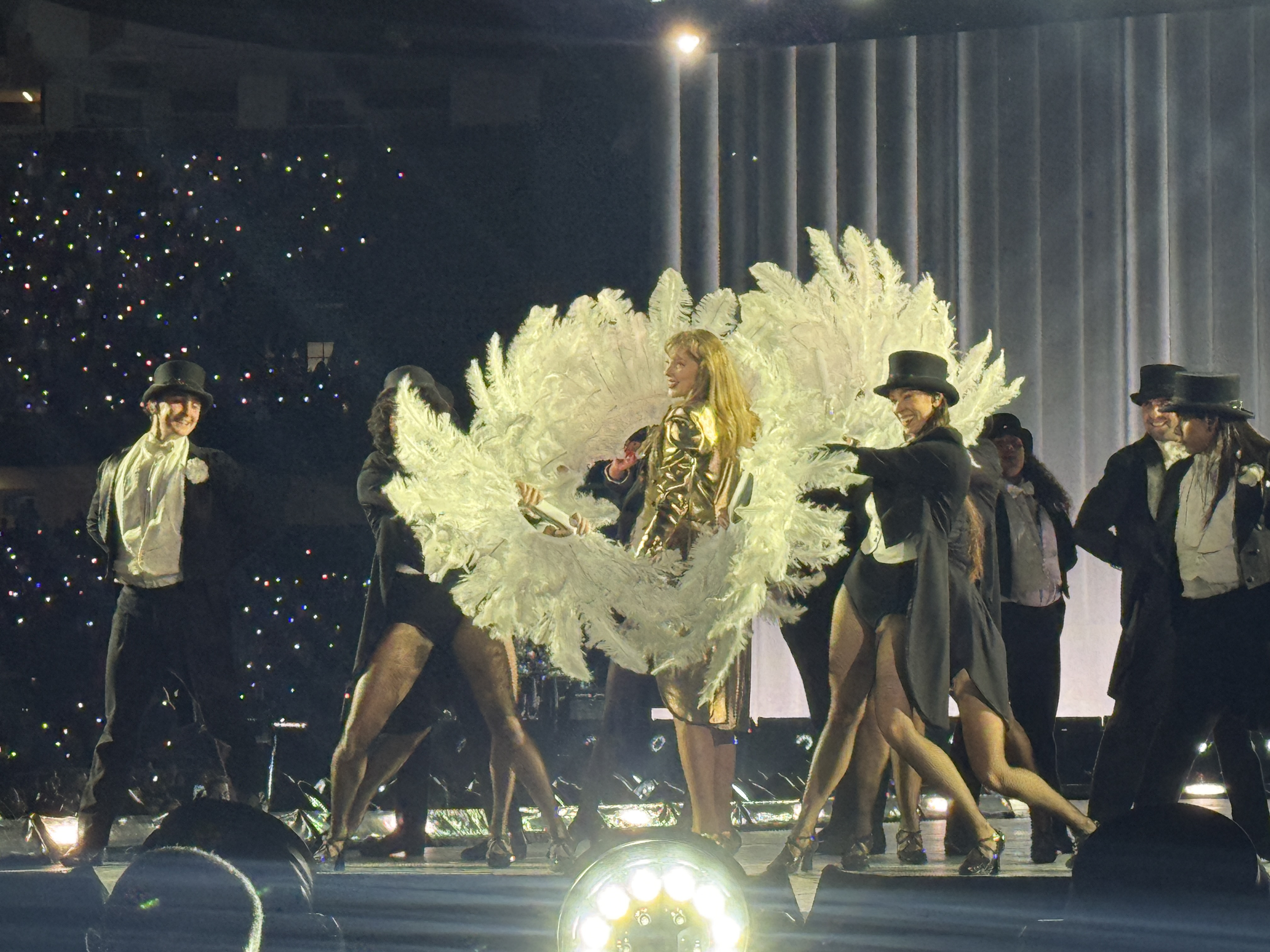
Swift performing "I Can Do It with a Broken Heart" on the Eras Tour in 2024

Starting from the Paris show of the Eras Tour on May 9, 2024, which was also the first concert of the European leg, Swift revamped the set list to include "I Can Do It with a Broken Heart" in a new act dedicated to The Tortured Poets Department. The performance started with a pantomime skit that resembled silent films: backup dancers galvanized a tired Swift into getting dressed to continue performing, as a jazzy tune played in the background.

Props that were used in the number evoked the Golden Age of Hollywood, such as tailcoats, feathers, and canes. Ludovic Hunter-Tilney of the Financial Times thought that the choreography was inspired by the film director Busby Berkeley. Variety's Chris Willman selected the performances of "I Can Do It with a Broken Heart" and its preceding number, "The Smallest Man Who Ever Lived", as one of the best "nightly moments" of the tour, calling it "part 1930s Hollywood glam, part '60s Vegas, part marching band extravaganza".

At the June 23, 2024, show of the Eras Tour in London, Swift's then-boyfriend Travis Kelce made a surprise appearance during the introduction to the performance of "I Can Do It with a Broken Heart". Dressed in a top hat and tailcoat, Kelce joined the stage as a dancer, carrying Swift on stage and applying make-up to her face with a brush. Rolling Stone selected Kelce's surprise appearance as the best moment from the international leg of the Eras Tour.

== Personnel ==
Credits adapted from the liner notes of The Tortured Poets Department

- Taylor Swift – vocals, songwriter, producer
- Jack Antonoff – producer, songwriter, drums, piano, Juno, M1, percussion, programming
- Oli Jacobs – background vocals, percussion, spoken word, recording engineer
- Serban Ghenea – mixing
- Bryce Bordone – mix engineer
- Laura Sisk – recording engineer
- Jon Sher – assistant recording engineer
- Jack Manning – assistant recording engineer
- Lauren Marquez – assistant recording engineer
- Joe Caldwell – assistant recording engineer
- Randy Merrill – mastering
- Ryan Smith – mastering

== Charts ==
=== Weekly charts ===
Chart (2024)	Peak position
Argentina Hot 100 (Billboard)	64
Australia (ARIA)	5
Austria (Ö3 Austria Top 40)	11
Brazil Hot 100 (Billboard)	61
Canada Hot 100 (Billboard)	4
Canada AC (Billboard)	4
Canada Country (Billboard)	57
Canada CHR/Top 40 (Billboard)	2
Canada Hot AC (Billboard)	6
CIS Airplay (TopHit)	168
Croatia (Billboard)	19
Czech Republic Singles Digital (ČNS IFPI)	21
Denmark (Tracklisten)	19
Estonia Airplay (TopHit)	19
Estonia Airplay (TopHit) Dombresky Remix	92
Finland (Suomen virallinen lista)	47
France (SNEP)	72
Germany (GfK)	60
Global 200 (Billboard)	5
Greece International (IFPI)	10
India International (IMI)	11
Indonesia (Billboard)	24
Ireland (IRMA)	5
Israel (Mako Hitlist)	87
Italy (FIMI)	76
Latvia Streaming (LaIPA)	12
Lebanon (Lebanese Top 20)	19
Lithuania (AGATA)	30
Luxembourg (Billboard)	15
Malaysia (Billboard)	19
Malaysia International (RIM)	14
Middle East and North Africa (IFPI)	15
Netherlands (Single Top 100)	35
New Zealand (Recorded Music NZ)	6
Norway (VG-lista)	27
Philippines (Billboard)	10
Poland (Polish Streaming Top 100)	59
Portugal (AFP)	14
San Marino Airplay (SMRTV Top 50)	16
Singapore (RIAS)	5
Slovakia Airplay (ČNS IFPI)	42
Slovakia Singles Digital (ČNS IFPI)	28
South Africa Streaming (TOSAC)	20
Spain (Promusicae)	39
Sweden (Sverigetopplistan)	17
Switzerland (Schweizer Hitparade)	30
United Arab Emirates (IFPI)	11
UK Singles (Official Charts)	8
US Billboard Hot 100	3
US Adult Contemporary (Billboard)	14
US Adult Pop Airplay (Billboard)	4
US Pop Airplay (Billboard)	6

=== Monthly charts ===
Chart (2024)	Peak position
Estonia Airplay (TopHit)	27
Estonia Airplay (TopHit) Dombresky Remix	100
Slovakia (Rádio Top 100)	58

=== Year-end charts ===
Chart (2024)	Position
Australia (ARIA)	49
Canada (Canadian Hot 100)	33
Estonia Airplay (TopHit)	162
Global 200 (Billboard)	86
UK Singles (OCC)	38
US Billboard Hot 100	35
US Adult Pop Airplay (Billboard)	28
US Pop Airplay (Billboard)	46

2025 year-end chart performance
Chart (2025)	Position
Canada AC (Billboard)	22
Canada CHR/Top 40 (Billboard)	27
Canada Hot AC (Billboard)	28
US Adult Pop Airplay (Billboard)	45
US Pop Airplay (Billboard)	49

== Certifications ==
Certifications for "I Can Do It with a Broken Heart"
Region	Certification	Certified units/sales
Australia (ARIA)	3× Platinum	210,000^{‡}
Belgium (BRMA)	Gold	20,000^{‡}
Brazil (Pro-Música Brasil)	Diamond	160,000^{‡}
Denmark (IFPI Danmark)	Gold	45,000^{‡}
France (SNEP)	Gold	100,000^{‡}
New Zealand (RMNZ)	Platinum	30,000^{‡}
Poland (ZPAV)	Gold	25,000^{‡}
Portugal (AFP)	Gold	5,000^{‡}
Spain (Promusicae)	Gold	30,000^{‡}
United Kingdom (BPI)	Platinum	600,000^{‡}
Streaming
Central America (CFC)	Gold	3,500,000^{†}
^{‡} Sales+streaming figures based on certification alone.^{†} Streaming-only figures based on certification alone.

== Release history ==
Region	Date	Format(s)	Version(s)	Label(s)	Ref.
Italy	July 2, 2024	Radio airplay	Original	Universal	
United States	July 12, 2024	Contemporary hit radio	Original	Republic	
Various	July 16, 2024	Digital download; streaming	Original + instrumental	Republic	
Canada	July 19, 2024	Radio airplay	Original	Republic; Universal	
Various	September 13, 2024	Digital download; streaming	Dombresky remix	Republic	
