= Fortnight (song) =

2024 single by Taylor Swift featuring Post Malone

Single by Taylor Swift featuring Post Malone

from the album The Tortured Poets Department
- Released: April 19, 2024
- Studio: Conway Recording (Los Angeles); Electric Lady (New York City)
- Genre: Synth-pop; downtempo; electropop; adult contemporary; new wave
- Length: 3:48
- Label: Republic
- Songwriters: Taylor Swift; Jack Antonoff; Austin Post
- Producers: Taylor Swift; Jack Antonoff

Taylor Swift singles chronology
"Is It Over Now?" (2023)	"Fortnight" (2024)	"I Can Do It with a Broken Heart" (2024)

Post Malone singles chronology
"Pickup Man" (2023)	"Fortnight" (2024)	"I Had Some Help" (2024)

Music video
- "Fortnight" on YouTube

"Fortnight" is a song by the American singer-songwriter Taylor Swift featuring the American musician Post Malone. It was written by the artists alongside Jack Antonoff, who produced it with Swift. "Fortnight" is a 1980s-inspired synth-pop, downtempo, electropop, adult contemporary, and new wave ballad built around a steady, pulsing synth bassline, concluding with a bridge-like outro blending Swift and Malone's vocal harmonies. The lyrics describe an emotionally impactful romance that lasts for two weeks: a woman in an unhappy marriage rekindles with a married ex-lover, and the two vow to escape to Florida.

Republic Records released "Fortnight" to mainstream radio as the lead single from Swift's eleventh studio album, The Tortured Poets Department, on April 19, 2024. Reviews mostly praised the vocal chemistry between Swift and Malone but were mixed on the production; some reviews deemed it nuanced and catchy, but others described it as dull and derivative. The single peaked atop the Billboard Hot 100 in the United States, the Billboard Global 200 chart, and the charts in Australia, Canada, Malaysia, New Zealand, the Philippines, Singapore, the United Arab Emirates, and the United Kingdom. At the 67th Annual Grammy Awards in 2025, "Fortnight" was nominated for Song of the Year and Record of the Year.

Swift directed the music video for "Fortnight", collaborating with the Mexican cinematographer Rodrigo Prieto. Shot in black-and-white, the video portrays Swift as a mentally deranged patient in Victorian-gothic fashion mourning a past relationship and reliving its memories. It stars Malone as her lover, and the Dead Poets Society co-stars Ethan Hawke and Josh Charles as mad scientists experimenting on her. The video was met with critical praise and garnered a number of accolades, including Best Music Video at the 32nd Camerimage festival, five wins including Video of the Year at the 2024 MTV Video Music Awards, and Best Video at the 2024 MTV Europe Music Awards.

== Background and release ==
The American singer-songwriter Taylor Swift developed her eleventh studio album, The Tortured Poets Department, as an introspective body of work that reflected "events, opinions and sentiments from a fleeting and fatalistic moment in time—one that was both sensational and sorrowful in equal measure". She wrote and recorded it throughout the 2023 run of the Eras Tour, amidst intense media reports on her personal life, including a breakup after a long-term relationship with Joe Alwyn and a short-lived romantic relationship with Matty Healy.

Swift announced The Tortured Poets Department at the 66th Annual Grammy Awards on February 4, 2024, and unveiled the track listing via social media the following day. "Fortnight" is the opening track on the album, with Post Malone as the featured artist. Swift brought the track to Malone's home studio in Los Angeles, and he recorded his background vocals and additional hooks for the bridge. During an interview with Zane Lowe for Apple Music 1 in February 2024, Malone said that he had not heard the full song.

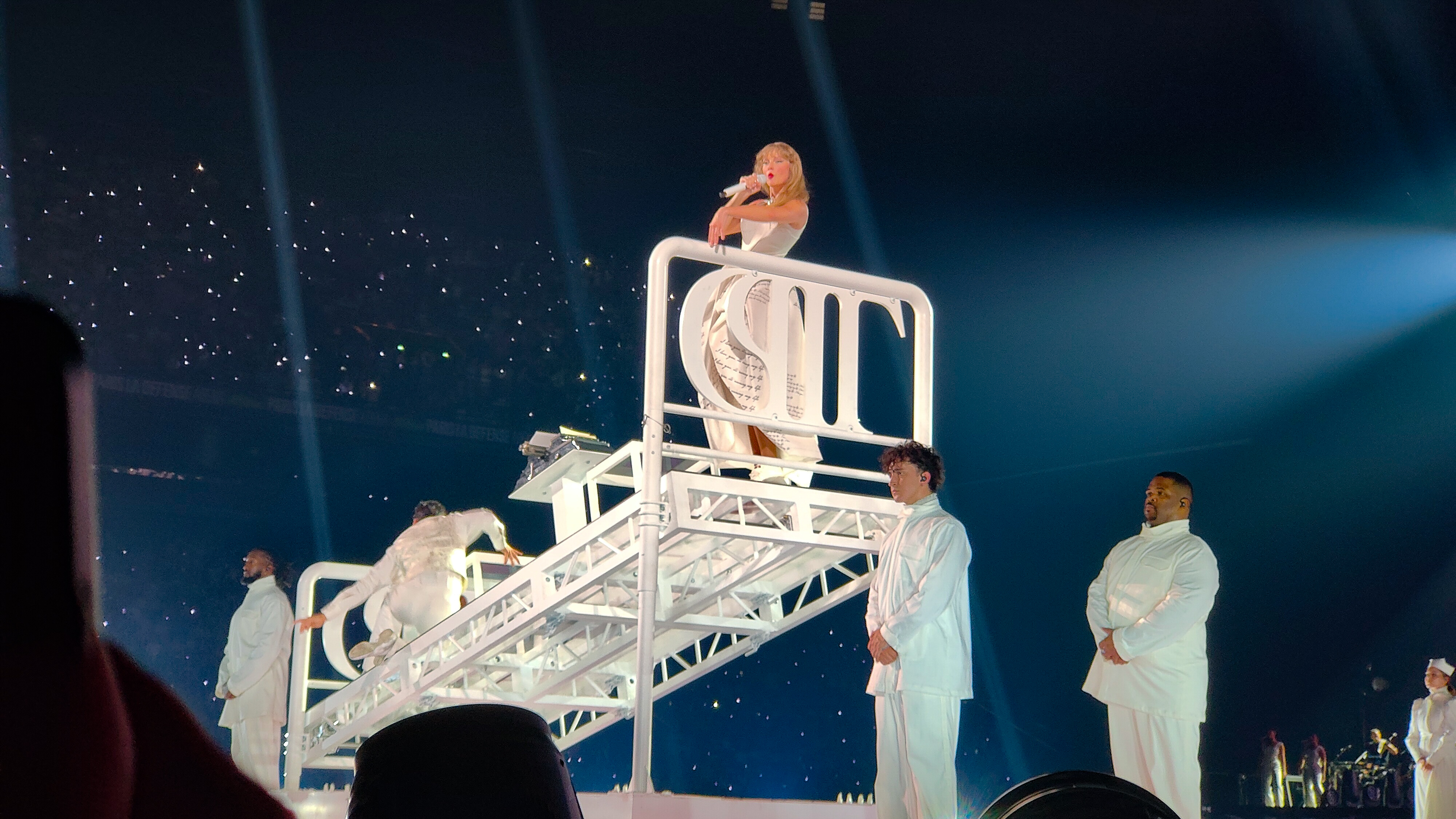
Swift performing "Fortnight" for The Tortured Poets Department act on the Eras Tour, on a bed emblazoned with the album's logo

"Fortnight" was released as the lead single of The Tortured Poets Department on April 19, 2024, concurrently with the album's release; it was released to United States contemporary hit radio and hot adult contemporary radio by Republic Records, Italian radio airplay by Universal Music Group, and Canadian radio airplay by Republic/Universal. Swift unveiled the cover artwork via social media; it is a grayscale photograph of Swift resting her cheek on a closed fist and Malone gazing into the camera with his hands clasped. The track was made available for purchase as a limited-time CD single through Swift's online store in the United States, Ireland, the United Kingdom, Germany, and Switzerland. (Note: References:) A remix by Blond:ish was released on May 21, and an acoustic version and a remix by Cults followed on July 9, 2024. A special 7-inch vinyl edition was released on April 12, 2025, to commemorate Record Store Day.

Starting from the Eras Tour shows in May 2024 in Paris, Swift revamped the set list to include songs from The Tortured Poets Department, including "Fortnight". For the performance of "Fortnight", the stage featured a "TTPD"-emblazoned bed and dancers dressed as nurses. Swift sang the song as she sat on a typewriter, across from a dancer, and the bed, which also resembled an office desk, moved across the stage.

== Production and music ==
Swift and Malone wrote "Fortnight" with Jack Antonoff, who programmed the track and played acoustic guitar, electric guitar, the Juno, the M1, drums, and percussion. Sean Hutchinson played additional drums, which were recorded by himself and Michael Riddleberger at Hutchinson Sounds in Brooklyn. Malone's vocals were recorded and produced by Louis Bell at Electric Feel Studios in Los Angeles. "Fortnight" was produced by Swift and Antonoff; recorded by Laura Sisk and Oli Jacobs at Conway Recording Studios in Los Angeles and Electric Lady Studios in New York City; and mixed by Serban Ghenea at Mixstar Studios in Virginia Beach.

"Fortnight"
A sample of "Fortnight", showing the pulsing synth bassline, Swift's monotonic vocals, and Malone's backing vocals in the lyric, "I love you, it's ruining my life."

"Fortnight" is 3 minutes and 48 seconds long. It is a 1980s-influenced ballad that incorporates synth-pop, downtempo, electropop, adult contemporary, and new wave. Set over a tempo of 96 beats per minute, the track begins with a minimalist, electronic arrangement of M1 synthesizer backing, Juno synthesizer sequence, and Swift's vocals sung in a monotone. The rhythm is punctuated by drum machine beats and a pulsing eighth-note synth bass generated by 8-bit synth plucks that repeat every eight bars.

In the refrain, the lyric, "I love you, it's ruining my life", features Swift's lead vocals accompanied by Malone's echoing backing vocals. After the first refrain, the arrangement becomes progressively dense, with thicker layers of synthesizer backing and louder drums. The second refrain, starting at 1 minute and 43 seconds, features an additional layer of snare drum and hi-hat. Towards the concluding bridge, which also serves as the outro, Malone and Swift deliver vocal harmonies; the former sings lead vocals in the outro's first half, and the latter in the second half. According to the music critic Annie Zaleski, Swift sounds "seething and resigned", while Malone adds a sense of longing with his "earnest, buttery-smooth melodic counterpoints".

Some critics opined that "Fortnight" was sonically similar to the muted pop sound of Swift's 2022 album Midnights. (Note: Attributed to reviews by Variety, Business Insider, The Hollywood Reporter, and American Songwriter) Clash's Lauren Webb wrote that the track has a 1980s power ballad sensibility reminiscent of such artists as Roxette, Cutting Crew, and Phil Collins, and The Guardian's Laura Snapes thought that the "burbling synths, booming drums and glazed backing vocals" evoked the music of the 1975. There were also multiple comparisons to the music of Lana Del Rey, which American Songwriter's Thom Donovan described as "bleak Americana".

== Lyrics and interpretations ==
The lyrics of "Fortnight" are about the strong impacts of a two-week romance that leaves behind fleeting emotions: Swift's narrator is a woman in an unhappy marriage, and she becomes a neighbor of an ex-lover, who is now married to another woman. They encounter each other on a daily basis in a suburban American town, watering the flowers in their garden and chatting about the weather. That she lives next door to her ex-lover makes her fantasize about killing the wife and resort to alcoholism to cope with her misery. In the double chorus that follows the second verse, Swift's character finds out about her husband's infidelity and desires to kill him also. In the conclusion, Malone's character, representing the ex-lover of Swift's character, fantasizes about escaping to Florida with her to escape the torturous reality that they are in.

Some publications highlighted that the title is a British English noun meaning two weeks, possibly referencing Swift's previous romances with British men; (Note: References:) Google searches for the definition of "fortnight" in the United States increased by 868% on the song's release day. Swift said that the track features many characteristics that define The Tortured Poets Department, including themes of "fatalism, longing, pining away, lost dreams" and hyperbolic and dramatic lyrics ("I love you, it's ruining my life"). Explaining her songwriting perspective to Amazon Music, she said that she imagined the setting of "Fortnight" as an American town where one's American Dream never materialized: "You ended up not with the person that you loved and now you just have to live with that every day, wondering what would've been maybe seeing them out."

Several journalists suggested that "Fortnight" is autobiographical in nature, but it also blends confessional and fictional elements. The short-lived yet emotionally impactful romance in "Fortnight" becomes the subject of many other album tracks, and its imagery of violence and death (such as the narrator fantasizing about murdering the ex-lover's wife and her own cheating husband) also recurs in them. Rob Sheffield of Rolling Stone opined that the "1950s bad-marriage theme" of unhappy suburban marriages with cheating husbands and dutiful housewives "on the verge of nervous breakdowns" was reminiscent of Swift's songwriting for her past albums, Folklore, Evermore, and Midnights. Donovan described the scenario of "Fortnight" as a "suburban nightmare". The New York Times' Lindsay Zoladz thought that the track is "chilly and controlled" until it "[thaws] and [glows]" after the lyric, "I love you, it's ruining my life." USA Today's Melissa Ruggeri dubbed the lyrics mentioning alcoholism as "darkly funny".

== Critical reception ==
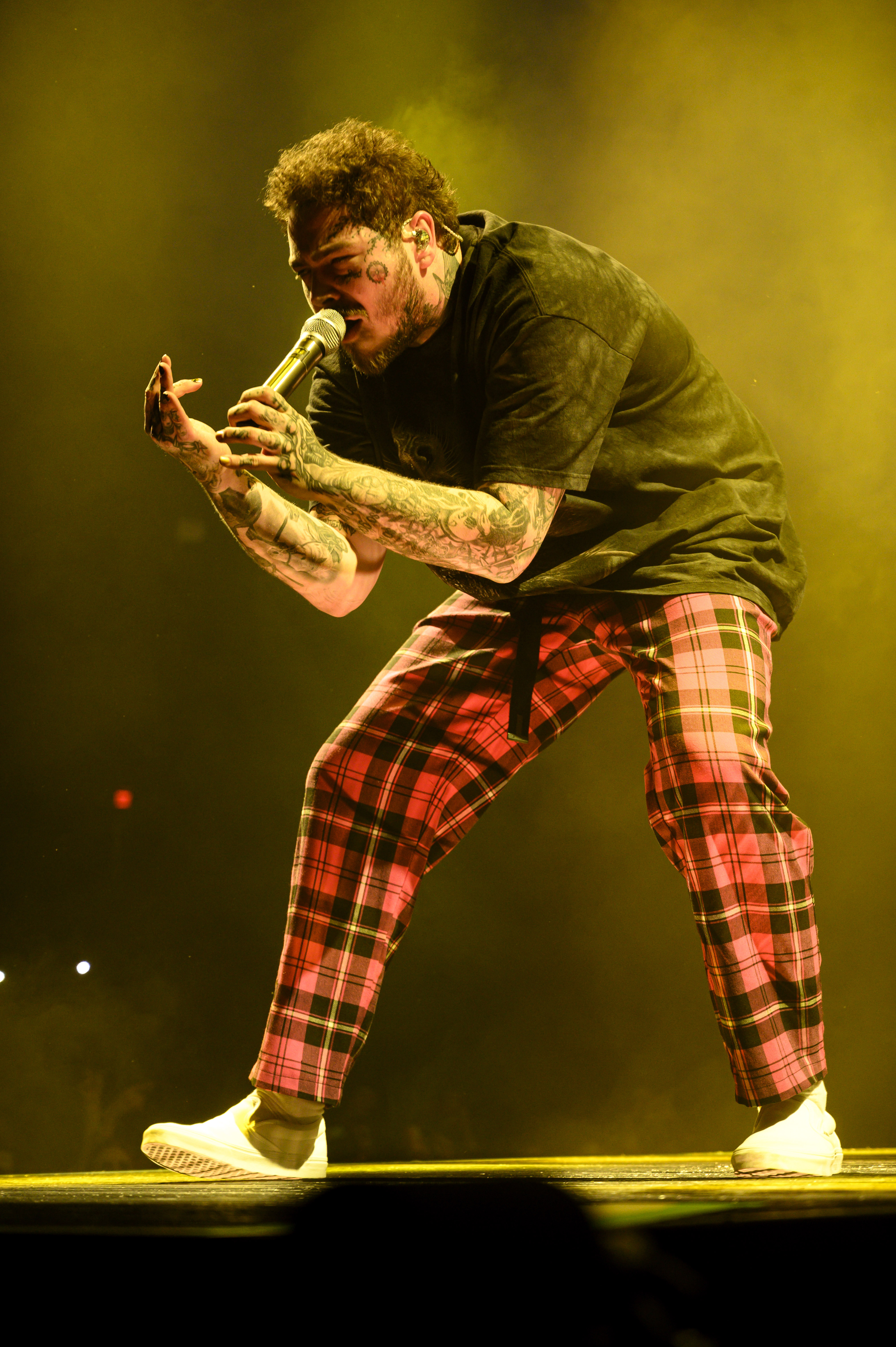
Critics praised Post Malone's guest vocals.

The track was picked as a highlight on The Tortured Poets Department by Alli Rosenbloom of CNN and Mesfin Fekadu of The Hollywood Reporter. In PopMatters, Igor Bannikov lauded "Fortnight" as the best opening track of Swift's career for featuring a "delicate and cunning" songcraft with a "buoyant" synth-pop production, Swift's vocal harmonies, and self-referential lyricism. Webb and NME's Laura Molloy thought that the track displayed a new musical direction for Swift, and The Irish Times' Finn McRemmond praised the "impossible catchy hook" despite the dreary theme. Zoladz highlighted the lyrics for portraying "how viscerally Swift can summon the flushed delirium of a doomed romance".

Many critics praised the vocal chemistry between Swift and Malone. John Meagher of the Irish Independent highlighted Malone's performance as more restrained compared to his usual "melodramatic" tendencies, and Ed Power of The Daily Telegraph wrote: "His breathy singing voice dovetails surprisingly with Swift's angsty coo." Billboard's Jason Lipshutz ranked "Fortnight" fifth out of the 31 tracks on the double album edition of The Tortured Poets Department, praising how Malone's appearance suits well with Swift's vocals and gives the bridge "subtle power and hangdog charm". Bianca Gracie of Grammy.com also praised Malone's "melancholic harmonies" for giving "more emotional weight" to Swift's storytelling lyrics.

Less enthusiastic reviews considered "Fortnight" a compositionally unmemorable song. Callie Ahlgrim of Business Insider deemed it uninventive and argued that it was too similar to Antonoff and Swift's previous collaborations, specifically calling it a derivative of Midnights. Mark Richardson of The Wall Street Journal deemed it mediocre, and Paste and Konstantinos Pappis from Our Culture Mag criticized the sound as empty and bland. Variety's Chris Willman regarded the single as a good choice for pop radio, but he contended that it was "not much of an indication of the more visceral, obsessive stuff" for the album's remainder. Alex Hudson of Exclaim! wrote that he was "genuinely shocked" that "such a dreary, unmemorable song" was released as a single.

The Hollywood Reporter ranked "Fortnight" among their best songs of 2024. Billboard placed the song at number 10 on their list of the 100 best songs of the year. At the 67th Annual Grammy Awards in 2025, "Fortnight" was nominated for Song of the Year and Record of the Year.

== Commercial performance ==
After one day of release, "Fortnight" set the single-day streaming record for any song on Spotify, surpassing the all-time peak previously held by Mariah Carey's song "All I Want for Christmas Is You" (1994). This achievement was registered in the Guinness World Records. The single debuted atop the Billboard Global 200, marking Swift's fifth number-one song and tying her with Bad Bunny for the most chart toppers among solo acts. It was one of the nine tracks from The Tortured Poets Department to debut within the top 10, extending Swift's number of top-10 entries to 33.

In the United States, "Fortnight" debuted at number 9 on Adult Pop Airplay and number 13 on Pop Airplay. It tied her own "Shake It Off" (2014) as the highest debut on the former chart, and "Bad Blood" (2015) as the second-highest debut on the latter chart. On the Adult Pop Airplay chart dated June 22, 2024, the single reached number one to become Swift's record-extending 13th chart topper and Malone's second. On the Billboard Hot 100, "Fortnight" debuted at number one on the chart dated May 4, 2024. As Swift's 12th number-one single and seventh number-one debut, it tied Swift with Ariana Grande for the most number-one debuts for a female artist. "Fortnight" also marked Malone's fifth number-one single and first number-one debut. The single spent two consecutive weeks atop the Hot 100.

"Fortnight" is Swift's fourth number-one single in the United Kingdom and 12th in Australia. The single also topped the charts in Canada, Singapore, and the United Arab Emirates, as well as Billboard's Hits of the World charts for Hong Kong, Malaysia, and the Philippines. It peaked at number two on the chart for the Middle East and North Africa (MENA) region, and charted within the top five of Billboard's Hits of the World charts for Taiwan and Indonesia. Across Europe, "Fortnight" reached number two in Austria, Denmark, Germany, and Portugal; number three in Switzerland; number four in Flanders, Latvia, Lithuania, Norway, and Sweden; number five in Iceland; and the top 10 in Slovakia, the Netherlands, and the Czech Republic. The single has been certified diamond in Brazil, five-times platinum in Australia, double platinum in New Zealand and the United Kingdom, and platinum in Belgium, Denmark, France, Poland, Portugal, Spain, and Switzerland.

== Music video ==
=== Development ===
Swift wrote and directed the music video for "Fortnight", whose cinematography was handled by the Mexican filmmaker Rodrigo Prieto. According to Swift, the music video for "Fortnight" was the visual representation of The Tortured Poets Department: "Pretty much everything in it is a metaphor or a reference to one corner of the album or another."

Four hours prior to the album's release, Swift posted a teaser for the music video on social media. The music video was released on April 19, 2024. It has a black-and-white cinematography and features Swift and Malone as ex-lovers, and Dead Poets Society's co-stars Ethan Hawke and Josh Charles as mad scientists carrying out tests on Swift. Malone recalled that Swift had to hide under an umbrella and drapes "over the golf cart so drones and a helicopter couldn't get footage" during filming of the video.

=== Synopsis ===
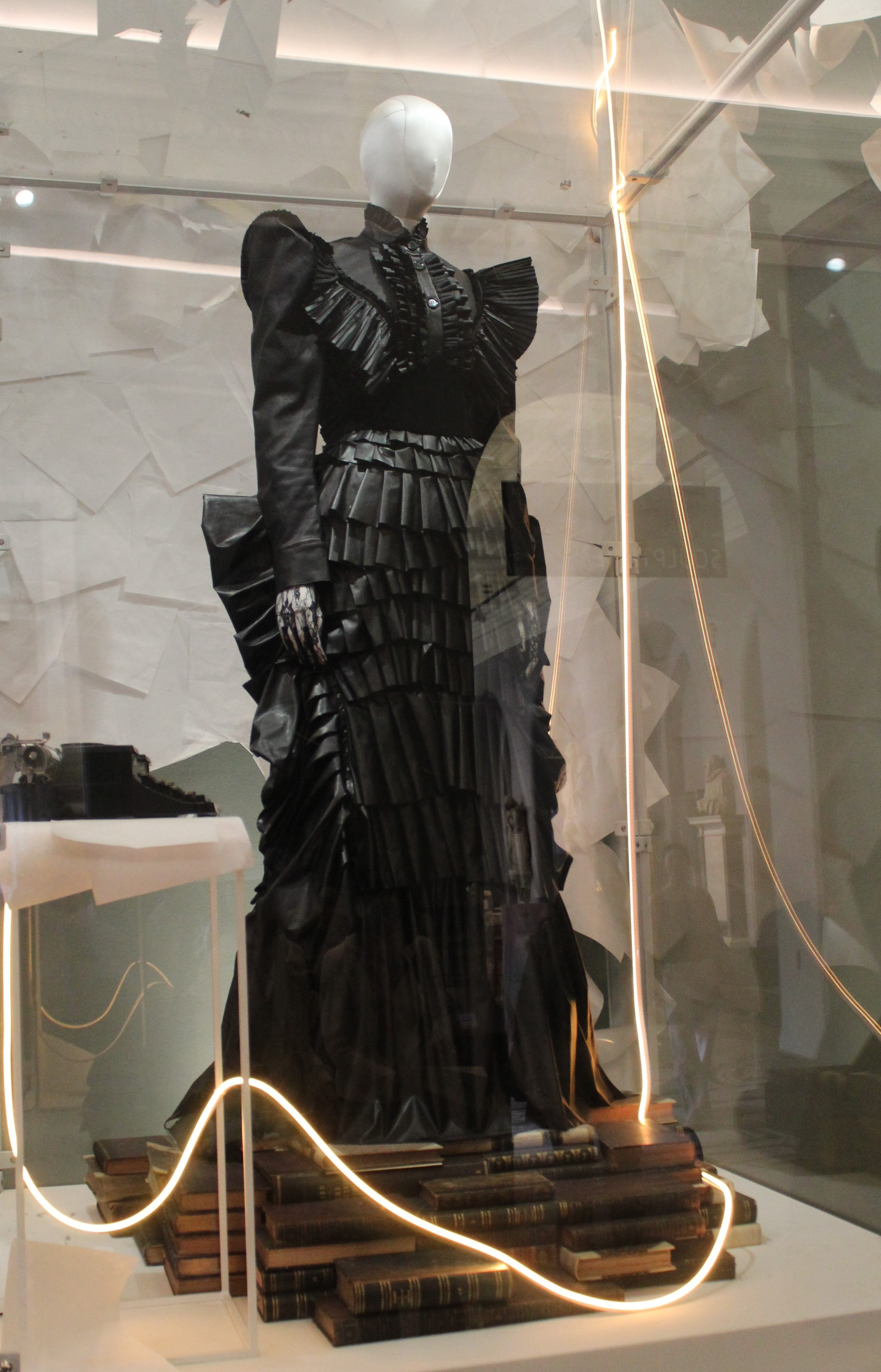
Swift's black Victorian-gothic ensemble gown from the music video, designed by Elena Velez (dress) and UNTTLD (top)

The video starts with Swift seen in a white dress and choker, chained to a bed in a mental facility; the bed is suspended on the wall. After a faceless person gives her a "Forget Him" pill, Swift wipes her face to reveal tattoos. She walks into a room filled with Royal 10 typewriters with black-masked figures typing them, donning a black Victorian mourning dress. She sits and begins typing with Malone across the room. Swift and Malone are then seen lying on top of a pile of papers, reading a book titled Us. They embrace on a lone highway before being caught up in a tornado that causes loose papers to swirl around them.

Back at the mental facility, Swift is seen strapped to a gurney in a laboratory. The doctors (Hawke and Charles) perform electroshock therapy on her as Malone watches from the side, before he unplugs the equipment to stop the procedure. In the final scene, Malone calls from a telephone booth that Swift, in a sparkling flapper dress, is on top of in the pouring thunderstorm rain, on an isolated cliff. He comes out of the booth and grabs Swift's hand. The video ends with silent-film credits.

=== Interpretations and reception ===
According to many publications, Swift's character in the video evokes the protagonist of the 2023 movie Poor Things, (Note: As discussed in Cosmopolitan The Daily Telegraph, Harper's Bazaar Vietnam, Entertainment Weekly, and Elle) and the scene of her being experimented on by mad scientists resembles Mary Shelley's 1818 gothic novel Frankenstein. (Note: As discussed in The Daily Telegraph, Première, and USA Today) In the French film magazine Première, Anthéa Claux compared the black-and-white cinematography and certain scenes to those of early-20th century German expressionist silent films: the close-up scene showing Swift's face and makeup evokes Metropolis (1927), and the mental facility setting with its bed suspended on the wall and distorted interiors resembles the settings of The Cabinet of Dr. Caligari (1920).

Analyses of the video identified themes of mourning and reliving memories of a past relationship. (Note: As discussed in Slant Magazine, The Daily Telegraph, and Rolling Stone) Fashion magazines examined Swift's fashion relating to Victorian and gothic styles that channeled poets and writers like Mary Shelley or Emily Dickinson. (Note: As discussed in Harper's Bazaar, Grazia Singapore, People, and Marie Claire) Ed Power of The Daily Telegraph thought that the video portrayed a haunting version of Swift that "gets under our skin like never before" and complimented the acting chemistry between Swift and Malone. According to the literature professor Matthew J.A. Green, the video of "Fortnight" was part of Swift's foray into literary gothic, which was an important artistic endeavor that represented womanhood and the critique of one's self.

At the 2024 MTV Video Music Awards, Swift won seven trophies, five of which were for "Fortnight", becoming the most-awarded artist in a single night in the awards' history. Its trophy for Video of the Year extended Swift's record as the artist with the most wins (five times). "Fortnight" also won Best Video at the 2024 MTV Europe Music Awards, and for his cinematography work, Prieto won the Grand Prize (Golden Frog) in the Music Videos category at the 32nd International Film Festival of the Art of Cinematography Camerimage.

== Accolades ==
Awards and nominations for "Fortnight"
Organization	Year	Category	Result	Ref.
Nickelodeon Kids' Choice Awards	2024	Favorite Music Collaboration	Nominated	
Set Decorators Society of America Awards	2024	Best Achievement in Décor/Design of a Short Format: Webseries, Music Video or Commercial	Won	
MTV Video Music Awards	2024	Video of the Year	Won	
MTV Video Music Awards	2024	Song of the Year	Nominated	
MTV Video Music Awards	2024	Best Collaboration	Won	
MTV Video Music Awards	2024	Best Direction	Won	
MTV Video Music Awards	2024	Best Cinematography	Nominated	
MTV Video Music Awards	2024	Best Editing	Won	
MTV Video Music Awards	2024	Best Visual Effects	Nominated	
MTV Video Music Awards	2024	Best Art Direction	Nominated	
MTV Video Music Awards	2024	Song of the Summer	Won	
Weibo Music Awards	2024	Song of the Year	Nominated	
Weibo Music Awards	2024	Music Video of the Year	Nominated	
NRJ Music Awards	2024	International Collaboration of the Year	Nominated	
MTV Europe Music Awards	2024	Best Video	Won	
MTV Europe Music Awards	2024	Best Collaboration	Nominated	
Myx Music Awards	2024	Global Video of the Year	Nominated	
International Film Festival of the Art of Cinematography Camerimage	2024	Golden Frog for Best Music Video	Won	
Musa Awards	2024	Anglo International Song of the Year	Nominated	
Musa Awards	2024	International Collaboration of the Year	Nominated	
BreakTudo Awards	2024	International Hit of the Year	Nominated	
Billboard Music Awards	2024	Top Collaboration	Nominated	
RTHK International Pop Poll Awards	2024	Top Ten International Gold Songs	Won	
NetEase Annual Music Awards	2024	Top English Single	Won	
QQ Music Dianfeng Awards	2024	Top 10 Singles of the Year	Won	
QQ Music Dianfeng Awards	2024	Top Western Song of the Year	Won	
Grammy Awards	2025	Record of the Year	Nominated	
Grammy Awards	2025	Song of the Year	Nominated	
Grammy Awards	2025	Best Music Video	Nominated	
Art Directors Guild Awards	2025	Excellence in Production Design for a Music Video or Webseries	Nominated	
Make-Up Artists and Hair Stylists Guild Awards	2025	Best Make-Up for a Commercials or Music Videos	Nominated	
American Society of Cinematographers Awards	2025	Outstanding Achievement in Cinematography in Music Video	Nominated	
Brit Awards	2025	Best International Song	Nominated	
iHeartRadio Music Awards	2025	Best Collaboration	Nominated	
iHeartRadio Music Awards	2025	Best Lyrics	Won	
iHeartRadio Music Awards	2025	Best Music Video	Won	
New Music Awards	2025	Top 40/CHR Song of the Year	Nominated	
Webby Awards	2025	Advertising, Media & PR – Best Community Engagement	Won	
Webby Awards	2025	Advertising, Media & PR – Best Community Engagement (People's Voice Winner)	Won	
BMI Pop Awards	2025	Most Performed Songs of the Year	Won	
Music Awards Japan	2025	Best International Pop Song in Japan	Nominated	
Music Awards Japan	2025	Best of Listeners' Choice: International Song	Nominated	
Shorty Awards	2025	Best User-Generated Content	Nominated	
American Music Awards	2025	Collaboration of the Year	Nominated	
AICP Awards	2025	AICP Post – Music Video	Nominated	
MacGuffin Awards	2025	Short Form: Commercials, Web Series, and Music Videos	Won	

== Personnel ==
Credits are adapted from the liner notes of The Tortured Poets Department.

- Taylor Swift – vocals, songwriter, producer
- Post Malone – vocals, songwriter
- Jack Antonoff – producer, songwriter, drums, Juno, M1, percussion, electric guitar, acoustic guitar, programming
- Louis Bell – vocal producer, vocal engineer
- Serban Ghenea – mixing
- Bryce Bordone – mix engineer
- Laura Sisk – recording engineer
- Oli Jacobs – recording engineer
- Jon Sher – assistant recording engineer
- Jack Manning – assistant recording engineer
- Lauren Marquez – assistant recording engineer
- Sean Hutchinson – drums, drums recording
- Michael Riddleberger – recording engineer
- Randy Merrill – mastering

== Charts ==
=== Weekly charts ===
Chart (2024–2025)	Peak position
Argentina Hot 100 (Billboard)	22
Australia (ARIA)	1
Austria (Ö3 Austria Top 40)	2
Belgium (Ultratop 50 Flanders)	4
Belgium (Ultratop 50 Wallonia)	22
Brazil Hot 100 (Billboard)	12
Canada Hot 100 (Billboard)	1
Canada AC (Billboard)	3
Canada CHR/Top 40 (Billboard)	3
Canada Hot AC (Billboard)	2
CIS Airplay (TopHit)	54
Costa Rica (FONOTICA)	14
Croatia (Billboard)	6
Croatia International Airplay (Top lista)	11
Croatia International Albums (HDU) 7-inch vinyl	1
Czech Republic Airplay (ČNS IFPI)	7
Czech Republic Singles Digital (ČNS IFPI)	8
Denmark (Tracklisten)	2
Denmark Airplay (Tracklisten)	16
Ecuador (Billboard)	25
Estonia Airplay (TopHit)	9
Estonia Airplay (TopHit) Blond:ish Remix	23
Finland (Suomen virallinen lista)	17
France (SNEP)	19
France Airplay (SNEP)	40
Germany (GfK)	2
Global 200 (Billboard)	1
Greece International (IFPI)	3
Hong Kong (Billboard)	1
Hungary (Single Top 40)	24
Iceland (Tónlistinn)	5
India International (IMI)	1
Indonesia (Billboard)	5
Ireland (IRMA)	2
Israel (Mako Hitlist)	40
Italy (FIMI)	22
Japan Hot 100 (Billboard)	37
Latvia Airplay (LaIPA)	3
Latvia Streaming (LaIPA)	4
Latvia Airplay (TopHit) Blond:ish Remix	2
Lebanon Airplay (Lebanese Top 20)	9
Lithuania (AGATA)	4
Lithuania Airplay (TopHit)	3
Luxembourg (Billboard)	4
Malaysia (Billboard)	1
Malaysia International (RIM)	1
MENA (IFPI)	2
Netherlands (Dutch Top 40)	21
Netherlands (Single Top 100)	8
New Zealand (Recorded Music NZ)	1
Norway (VG-lista)	4
Panama (PRODUCE)	49
Peru (Billboard)	19
Philippines (Billboard)	1
Poland (Polish Streaming Top 100)	16
Portugal (AFP)	2
San Marino (SMRRTV Top 50)	44
Saudi Arabia (IFPI)	3
Singapore (RIAS)	1
Slovakia Airplay (ČNS IFPI)	22
Slovakia Singles Digital (ČNS IFPI)	8
South Africa Streaming (TOSAC)	4
South Korea (Circle)	116
Spain (Promusicae)	16
Sweden (Sverigetopplistan)	4
Switzerland (Schweizer Hitparade)	3
Taiwan (Billboard)	2
Turkey International Airplay (Radiomonitor Türkiye)	8
UAE (IFPI)	1
UK Singles (Official Charts)	1
US Billboard Hot 100	1
US Adult Contemporary (Billboard)	11
US Adult Pop Airplay (Billboard)	1
US Dance Airplay (Billboard)	13
US Pop Airplay (Billboard)	5

=== Monthly charts ===
Chart (2024)	Peak position
Czech Republic (Rádio Top 100)	29
Czech Republic (Singles Digitál Top 100)	50
Estonia Airplay (TopHit)	10
Latvia Airplay (TopHit) Blond:ish Remix	3
Lithuania Airplay (TopHit)	4
Slovakia (Rádio Top 100)	27
Slovakia (Singles Digitál Top 100)	40
South Korea (Circle)	186

=== Year-end charts ===
Chart (2024)	Position
Australia (ARIA)	20
Austria (Ö3 Austria Top 40)	48
Belgium (Ultratop 50 Flanders)	65
Belgium (Ultratop 50 Wallonia)	92
Canada (Canadian Hot 100)	16
Estonia Airplay (TopHit)	25
Estonia Airplay (TopHit) Blond:ish Remix	193
Germany (GfK)	44
Global 200 (Billboard)	26
Iceland (Tónlistinn)	99
New Zealand (Recorded Music NZ)	34
Philippines (Philippines Hot 100)	47
Sweden (Sverigetopplistan)	88
Switzerland (Schweizer Hitparade)	65
UK Singles (OCC)	19
US Billboard Hot 100	22
US Adult Contemporary (Billboard)	18
US Adult Pop Airplay (Billboard)	20
US Pop Airplay (Billboard)	27

Year-end chart performance
Chart (2025)	Position
Argentina Anglo Airplay (Monitor Latino)	51
Canada AC (Billboard)	66
Canada Hot AC (Billboard)	92

== Certifications ==
Certifications for "Fortnight"
Region	Certification	Certified units/sales
Australia (ARIA)	5× Platinum	350,000^{‡}
Belgium (BRMA)	Platinum	40,000^{‡}
Brazil (Pro-Música Brasil)	Diamond	160,000^{‡}
Canada (Music Canada)	Gold	40,000^{‡}
Denmark (IFPI Danmark)	Platinum	90,000^{‡}
France (SNEP)	Platinum	200,000^{‡}
Germany (BVMI)	Gold	300,000^{‡}
Italy (FIMI)	Gold	50,000^{‡}
New Zealand (RMNZ)	2× Platinum	60,000^{‡}
Poland (ZPAV)	Platinum	50,000^{‡}
Portugal (AFP)	Platinum	10,000^{‡}
Spain (Promusicae)	Platinum	60,000^{‡}
Switzerland (IFPI Switzerland)	Platinum	30,000^{‡}
United Kingdom (BPI)	2× Platinum	1,200,000^{‡}
Streaming
Central America (CFC)	Gold	3,500,000^{†}
^{‡} Sales+streaming figures based on certification alone.^{†} Streaming-only figures based on certification alone.

== Release history ==
Region	Date	Format	Version	Label(s)	Ref.
Canada	April 19, 2024	Radio airplay	Original	Republic; Universal	
Italy	April 19, 2024	Radio airplay	Original	Universal	
United States	April 19, 2024	Contemporary hit radio	Original	Republic	
United States	April 19, 2024	Hot adult contemporary radio	Original	Republic	
Germany	April 25, 2024	CD single	Original	Universal	
Switzerland	April 25, 2024	CD single	Original	Universal	
Ireland	May 3, 2024	CD single	Original	Universal	
United Kingdom	May 3, 2024	CD single	Original	Universal	
Various	May 21, 2024	Digital download; streaming	Blond:ish remix	Republic	
United States	May 31, 2024	CD single	Original	Republic	
Various	July 9, 2024	Digital download; streaming	Acoustic; Cults remix	Republic	
Various	April 12, 2025	7-inch vinyl	Original; Blond:ish remix	Republic	
