= Hannah Boleyn =

British singer songwriter

- Born: Hannah Beighton; 1989 or 1990 (age 36–37)
- Origin: Kimcote, England, United Kingdom
- Genres: electronic dance music
- Occupation: Singer songwriter

Hannah Boleyn (born 1989 or 1990) is a British singer-songwriter from Kimcote, England. Her 2023 release "DNA (Loving You)", that she co-wrote and performed with Billy Gillies, peaked at number nine on the UK Singles Chart in January 2024. Boleyn has collaborated with several electronic music artists including Galantis, John Summit, D.O.D., and KSHMR. Her debut single, "When You're Gone", was released in 2013 on Tudor Gate Records and made the BBC Radio 2 playlist.

== Discography ==
=== Albums ===
Title	Details
The Boleyn Affair	Released: 2015; Label: Format: Digital download

=== Singles ===
List of singles, with selected chart positions
Title	Year	Chart positions			Certifications
Title	Year	UK	FRA	IRE	Certifications
"When You're Gone"	2013	—	—	—	
"Cemetery"	2014	—	—	—	
"So OK"	2015	—	—	—	
"One Drink" (PBH & Jack featuring Hannah Boleyn)	2020	—	—	—	
"So Why" (Ree featuring Hannah Boleyn)	2020	—	—	—	
"Cool Kids" (Diviners featuring Hannah Boleyn)	2020	—	—	—	
"Whiplash" (with Sam Collins and AXA)	2020	—	—	—	
"Coffee & Coke" (PBH & Jack x PS1 featuring Hannah Boleyn)	2021	—	—	—	
"Voodoo" (Philip George and Truth Be Told featuring Hannah Boleyn)	2021	—	—	—	
"Show Me" (John Summit featuring Hannah Boleyn)	2022	—	—	—	
"DNA (Loving You)" (Billy Gillies featuring Hannah Boleyn)	2023	9	167	8	BPI: Platinum; ZPAV: Gold
"Little Bit Yours" (with Galantis)	2023	—	—	—	
"Tears On the Dancefloor" (KSHMR featuring Hannah Boleyn)	2023	—	—	—	
"Dominos" (D.O.D. featuring Hannah Boleyn)	2024	—	—	—	
"Right Here All Along" (Billy Gilles featuring Hannah Boleyn)	2024	—	—	—	
"Have You Ever Loved (Ellie)" (Hannah Laing featuring Hannah Boleyn)	2025	—	—	—	
"Don't Go Breaking My Heart" (with Joel Corry)	2026	—	—	—	
