= Billy Gillies =

Northern Irish disc jockey and record producer

- Born: 1989 or 1990 (age 36–37)
- Origin: Belfast, Northern Ireland, United Kingdom
- Genre: Trance
- Occupations: Record producer, Disc Jockey
- Website: www.atlanticrecords.com/artists/billy-gillies

Billy Gillies (born 1989 or 1990) is a British disc jockey and trance music producer from Belfast, Northern Ireland. His 2023 single released with Hannah Boleyn, "DNA (Loving You)", peaked at number nine on the UK Singles Chart in January 2024, and his 2022 single "Lagoon" is known as a "big fan favourite". Gillies has released several singles on the Afterdark record label, and was signed to Atlantic Records in 2023. Gillies is also known for his live performances and international touring.

== Discography ==
List of singles, with selected chart positions
Title	Year		Chart positions			Certifications
Title	Year	Label	UK	FRA	IRE	Certifications
"Fireworks"	2014		—	—	—	
"Lagoon"	2022		—	—	—	
"Don’t Call Me Baby" (with Madison Avenue)	2023	Atlantic Records	—	—	—	
"DNA (Loving You)" (featuring Hannah Boleyn)	2023	Big Beat Records	9	167	8	BPI: Platinum; ZPAV: Gold
Fair (featuring Betsy)	2024	Big Beat Records	-	-	-	
Right Here All Along (featuring Hannah Boleyn)	2024	Big Beat Records	-	-	-	
Stay Happy	2024	Big Beat Records	-	-	-	
Discoland (with Flip & Fill feat. Karen Parry)	2025	Xploded Music	-	-	-	
Crystallize (Featuring Nu-La)	2025	Spinnin' Records	-	-	-	
