= DNA (Loving You) =

2023 single by Billy Gillies featuring Hannah Boleyn

Single by Billy Gillies featuring Hannah Boleyn
- Released: 28 July 2023
- Genre: Trance
- Length: 2:44
- Label: Big Beat
- Songwriter(s): Billy Gillies; Hannah Boleyn; Leon Bolier; Frederik D Freek Geuze; Nathan Nicholson
- Producer(s): Billy Gillies

Billy Gillies singles chronology
"Don't Call Me Baby" (2023)	"DNA (Loving You)" (2023)

Hannah Boleyn singles chronology
"Time After Time" (2023)	"DNA (Loving You)" (2023)	"Miami" (2023)

"DNA (Loving You)" is a song by British DJ Billy Gillies featuring British singer Hannah Boleyn. It was released on 28 July 2023, with the lyrics conveying "a sense of longing and faith". "DNA (Loving You)" peaked at number nine on the UK Singles Chart.

== Reception ==
Grant Gilmore from EDM Identity said "'DNA (Loving You)' sees Billy Gillies look to his influences to create a trance-laden dance tune that will have you bopping right along with it." Gilmore called the song "an instant summer hit".

== Track listing ==
Digital download and streaming
No.	Title	Length
1.	"DNA (Loving You)"	2:44

Digital download and streaming
No.	Title	Length
1.	"DNA (Loving You)" (supertrend slow edit)	2:45

Digital download and streaming
No.	Title	Length
1.	"DNA (Loving You)" (beauweiss bass n breaks remix)	3:16

Digital download and streaming
No.	Title	Length
1.	"DNA (Loving You)" (Joel Corry remix)	3:00

== Charts ==
The song debuted at number 97 on the UK Singles Chart and has peaked at number 9.

=== Weekly charts ===
Weekly chart performance for "DNA (Loving You)"
Chart (2023–2024)	Peak position
Belgium (Ultratop 50 Flanders)	20
Belgium (Ultratop 50 Wallonia)	17
Czech Republic (Rádio – Top 100)	10
France (SNEP)	167
Ireland (IRMA)	8
Poland (Polish Airplay Top 100)	26
Slovakia (Rádio Top 100)	23
UK Singles (OCC)	9
UK Dance (OCC)	2

=== Year-end charts ===
Year-end chart performance for "DNA (Loving You)"
Chart (2024)	Position
Belgium (Ultratop 50 Flanders)	35
Belgium (Ultratop 50 Wallonia)	74
UK Singles (OCC)	84

== Certifications ==
Region	Certification	Certified units/sales
Poland (ZPAV)	Gold	25,000^{‡}
United Kingdom (BPI)	Platinum	600,000^{‡}
^{‡} Sales+streaming figures based on certification alone.
