= The Lumineers discography =

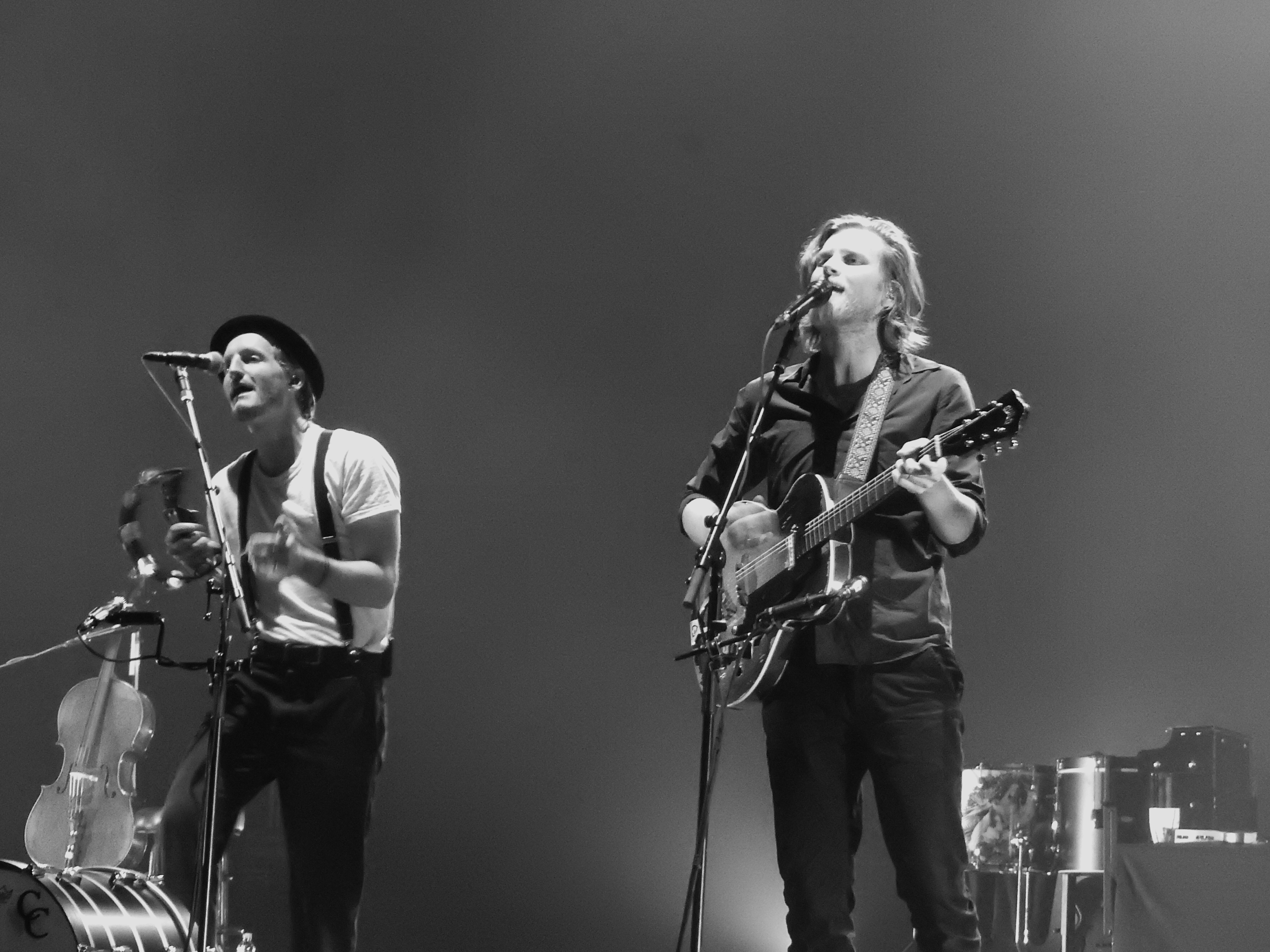
- The Lumineers in 2016
- Studio albums: 5
- EPs: 15
- Live albums: 1
- Singles: 19
- Music videos: 19
- Promotional singles: 5

The discography of the Lumineers, an American folk rock band, consists of five studio albums, 15 extended plays, 19 singles, five promotional singles and 19 music videos. In 2011, the Lumineers released a self-recorded extended play. The release of the EP and extensive touring brought the group to the attention of Dualtone Records, which signed them in 2012.

The Lumineers then worked extensively with producer Ryan Hadlock in recording their self-titled debut studio album, which was released in April 2012. The album reached number two on the United States Billboard 200 and the top ten of the Australian, Canadian and United Kingdom album charts – it was certified platinum by the Recording Industry Association of America (RIAA) and Music Canada (MC). Three singles, "Ho Hey", "Stubborn Love" and "Submarines" were released from the album: "Ho Hey" peaked at number three on the US Billboard Hot 100 and was certified platinum by the RIAA.

== Studio albums ==
List of studio albums, with selected chart positions and certifications
Title	Album details	Peak chart positions										Sales	Certifications
Title	Album details	US	AUS	AUT	BEL	CAN	FRA	GER	IRL	SWI	UK	Sales	Certifications
The Lumineers	Released: April 3, 2012 (US); Label: Dualtone; Formats: CD, digital download, LP	2	7	24	41	2	19	17	3	14	8	US: 1,750,000	RIAA: 4× Platinum; ARIA: Platinum; BPI: Platinum; FIMI: Gold; IRMA: Platinum; MC: 5× Platinum; SNEP: Gold
Cleopatra	Released: April 8, 2016 (US); Label: Dualtone; Formats: CD, digital download, LP	1	2	13	23	1	44	16	4	5	1		RIAA: 2× Platinum; BPI: Gold; FIMI: Gold; MC: 3× Platinum; SNEP: Gold
III	Released: September 13, 2019; Label: Decca; Formats: CD, digital download, LP, streaming	2	23	26	34	2	122	40	11	10	8	US: 73,000	RIAA: Gold; MC: Gold
Brightside	Released: January 14, 2022; Label: Dualtone; Formats: CD, digital download, LP, streaming	6	94	21	32	5	128	30	54	17	18	US: 26,000	
Automatic	Released: February 14, 2025; Label: Dualtone; Formats: CD, digital download, LP, streaming	16	—	47	139	24	—	84	—	60	— (Note: "Automatic" did not enter the UK Albums Chart, but peaked at number 21 on the UK Albums Sales Chart.)		
"—" denotes a recording that did not chart or was not released in that territory.

== Live albums ==
List of live albums, with selected details
Title	Album details
Live from Wrigley Field	Released: September 27, 2024; Label: Dualtone; Format: CD, Streaming

== Extended plays ==
List of extended plays
Title	Details
The Lumineers	Released: 2011 (US); Label: Self-released; Format: CD
Winter	Released: November 23, 2012 (US); Label: Dualtone; Format: LP
Song Seeds	Released: April 22, 2017; Label: Decca; Format: LP
C-Sides	Released: July 13, 2018; Label: Decca; Format: Digital download, streaming
Live Tracks	Released: August 24, 2018; Label: Decca; Format: Digital download, streaming
Gloria Sparks	Released: May 17, 2019; Label: Decca; Format: Digital download, streaming
Junior Sparks	Released: August 16, 2019; Label: Decca; Format: Digital download, streaming
Jimmy Sparks	Released: September 13, 2019; Label: Decca; Format: Digital download, streaming
Live from the Last Night of the Tour	Released: May 19, 2021; Label: Decca; Format: Digital download, streaming
Love	Released: August 4, 2021; Label: Decca; Format: Digital download, streaming
Loss	Released: August 11, 2021; Label: Decca; Format: Digital download, streaming
Crimes	Released: August 18, 2021; Label: Decca; Format: Digital download, streaming
Brightside Bonus Tracks	Released: May 13, 2022; Label: Decca; Format: LP, digital download, streaming; Including a cover of The Cure's song, "just like heaven"
Billions Club	Released: September 9, 2023; Label: Dualtone; Format: LP
The Leading Ladies	Released: February 5, 2024; Label: Decca; Format: Digital download, streaming

== Singles ==
List of singles, with selected chart positions and certifications, showing year released and album name
Title	Year	Peak chart positions										Certifications	Album
Title	Year	US	US Rock	BEL	CAN	FRA	IRL	ITA	SWE	SWI	UK	Certifications	Album
"Ho Hey"	2012	3	1	14	2	6	2	5	9	7	8	RIAA: Platinum; ARIA: 3× Platinum; BPI: 5× Platinum; FIMI: 3× Platinum; MC: Diamond	The Lumineers
"Stubborn Love"	2012	70	10	— (Note: "Stubborn Love" did not enter the Wallonie Ultratop 50, but peaked at number 32 on the Ultratip chart.)	60	—	84	101	—	—	—	RIAA: Platinum; BPI: Gold; FIMI: Gold; MC: 2× Platinum	The Lumineers
"Submarines"	2013	—	31	—	—	—	—	—	—	—	—		The Lumineers
"Ophelia"	2016	66	5	— (Note: "Ophelia" did not enter the Wallonie Ultratop 50, but peaked at number 26 on the Ultratip chart.)	33	188	28	—	— (Note: "Ophelia" did not enter the Swedish Singles chart, but peaked at number six on the Sweden Heatseeker chart.)	49	52	RIAA: 4× Platinum; ARIA: Platinum; BPI: 2× Platinum; FIMI: Platinum; MC: 8× Platinum; SNEP: Gold	Cleopatra
"Cleopatra"	2016	— (Note: "Cleopatra" did not enter the Billboard Hot 100, but peaked at number 21 on the Bubbling Under Hot 100 Singles chart, which acts as an extension to the Hot 100.)	11	— (Note: "Cleopatra" did not enter the Wallonie Ultratop 50, but charted as an "extra tip" on the Ultratip chart.)	80	—	—	—	—	—	— (Note: "Cleopatra" did not enter the UK Singles Chart, but peaked at number 90 on the UK Singles Sales Chart.)	BPI: Gold; FIMI: Gold; MC: Platinum	Cleopatra
"Angela"	2016	— (Note: "Angela" did not enter the Billboard Hot 100, but peaked at number 12 on the Hot Singles Sales chart.)	10	— (Note: "Angela" did not enter the Wallonie Ultratop 50, but charted as an "extra tip" on the Ultratip chart.)	92	138	—	—	—	— (Note: "Angela" did not enter the Swiss Singles chart, but charted at number 89 on the Swiss Airplay chart.)	— (Note: "Angela" did not enter the UK Singles Chart, but peaked at number 39 on the UK Physical Singles Chart.)	BPI: Silver; MC: Platinum	Cleopatra
"Sleep on the Floor"	2016	—	11	—	84	—	—	—	—	—	—	BPI: Gold; MC: Platinum	Cleopatra
"Blue Christmas"	2016	—	50	—	—	—	—	—	—	—	—		A Bad Moms Christmas
"Walls (Circus)"	2018	—	45	—	—	—	—	—	—	—	—		Non-album singles
"Pretty Paper"	2018	—	—	—	—	—	—	—	—	—	—		Non-album singles
"Gloria"	2019	— (Note: "Gloria" did not enter the Billboard Hot 100, but peaked at number 31 on the Digital Song Sales chart.)	5	— (Note: "Gloria" did not enter the Wallonie Ultratop 50, but charted as an "extra tip" on the Ultratip chart.)	—	—	—	—	—	—	— (Note: "Gloria" did not enter the UK Singles Chart, but peaked at number 41 on the UK Singles Sales Chart.)	MC: Gold	III
"It Wasn't Easy to Be Happy for You"	2019	—	30	—	—	—	—	—	—	—	—		III
"Life in the City"	2019	—	12	—	—	—	—	—	—	—	—		III
"Salt and the Sea"	2020	—	26	—	—	—	—	—	—	—	—		III
"Brightside"	2021	— (Note: "Brightside" did not enter the Billboard Hot 100, but peaked at number 24 on the Bubbling Under Hot 100 Singles chart, which acts as an extension to the Hot 100.)	13	—	64	—	—	—	—	—	— (Note: "Brightside" did not enter the UK Singles Chart, but peaked at number 31 on the UK Physical Singles Chart Top 100.)		Brightside
"Big Shot"	2021	—	35	—	—	—	—	—	—	—	—		Brightside
"A.M. Radio"	2021	—	24	—	—	—	—	—	—	—	—		Brightside
"Where We Are"	2022	—	19	—	—	—	—	—	—	—	—		Brightside
"Up All Night" (with James Bay and Noah Kahan)	2024	—	28	—	—	—	—	—	—	—	— (Note: "Up All Night" did not enter the UK Singles Chart, but peaked at number 99 on the UK Singles Sales Chart.)		Changes All the Time
"Same Old Song"	2025	—	20	—	—	—	—	—	—	—	—		Automatic
"You're All I Got" / "So Long"	2025	—	33	—	—	—	—	—	—	—	—		Automatic
"You're All I Got" / "So Long"	2025	—	50	—	—	—	—	—	—	—	—		Automatic
"Asshole (First We Ever Met)"	2025	—	27	—	—	—	—	—	—	—	—		Automatic
"Old Lovers" (Tom Odell featuring The Lumineers)	2026	—	—	—	—	—	—	—	—	—	—		Non-album single
"—" denotes single that did not chart or was not released in that territory.

=== Promotional singles ===
List of songs, with selected chart positions, showing year released and album name
Title	Year	Peak chart positions				Album
Title	Year	US DL	US Alt. DL	US Rock	CAN DL	Album
"Boots of Spanish Leather"	2013	—	—	—	—	Cleopatra
"Angela" (Live, 2016)	2016	—	—	—	—	Non-album promotional singles
"Subterranean Homesick Blues" (featuring Andrew Bird)	2017	—	—	—	—	Non-album promotional singles
"Scotland"	2018	—	17	42	41	C-Sides
"Nightshade"	2019	45	6	17	—	For the Throne: Music Inspired by the HBO Series Game of Thrones
"Christmas (Baby Please Come Home)"	2019	—	—	—	—	Non-album promotional single
"Caves"	2021	—	—	—	—	Amerikinda: 20 Years of Dualtone
"—" denotes single that did not chart or was not released in that territory.

== Other charted and certified songs ==
List of songs, with selected chart positions, showing year released, certifications and album name
Title	Year	Peak chart positions										Certifications	Album
Title	Year	US	US Rock	AUS	CAN	CAN Rock	CIS	IRL	ITA	NZ Hot	WW	Certifications	Album
"Flowers in Your Hair"	2012	— (Note: "Flowers in Your Hair" did not enter the Billboard Hot 100, but peaked at number 18 on the Bubbling Under Hot 100 Singles chart, which acts as an extension to the Hot 100.)	19	—	—	—	—	—	109	—	—	RIAA: Gold; BPI: Silver; MC: Gold; RMNZ: Gold	The Lumineers
"Classy Girls"	2013	—	24	—	—	—	—	—	—	—	—		The Lumineers
"Dead Sea"	2013	—	30	—	—	—	—	—	—	—	—		The Lumineers
"Slow It Down"	2013	—	23	—	—	—	—	—	—	—	—	MC: Gold	The Lumineers
"Big Parade"	2013	—	37	—	—	—	—	—	—	—	—		The Lumineers
"Charlie Boy"	2013	—	48	—	—	—	—	—	—	—	—		The Lumineers
"This Must Be the Place (Naïve Melody)"	2013	—	— (Note: "This Must Be the Place (Naïve Melody)" did not enter the Hot Rock & Alternative Songs Chart, but peaked at number 28 on the Triple A Airplay Chart.)	—	—	—	—	—	—	—	—		The Lumineers
"Gale Song"	2013	—	25	—	48	—	—	—	—	—	—	MC: Gold	The Hunger Games: Catching Fire
"Gun Song"	2016	—	28	—	—	—	—	—	—	—	—		Cleopatra
"In the Light"	2016	—	30	—	—	—	—	—	—	—	—		Cleopatra
"Long Way from Home"	2016	—	32	—	—	—	—	—	—	—	—		Cleopatra
"My Eyes"	2016	—	34	—	—	—	—	—	—	—	—		Cleopatra
"Sick in the Head"	2016	—	40	—	—	—	—	—	—	—	—		Cleopatra
"Patience"	2016	—	41	—	—	—	—	—	—	—	—		Cleopatra
"Nobody Knows"	2016	—	— (Note: "Nobody Knows" did not enter the Hot Rock Songs Chart, but peaked at number 44 on the Rock Digital Song Sales Chart.)	—	—	—	—	—	—	—	—	RIAA: Gold	Pete's Dragon
"Donna"	2019	—	23	—	—	—	—	—	—	—	—		III
"Leader of the Landslide"	2019	—	33	—	—	—	—	—	—	—	—		III
"Left for Denver"	2019	—	38	—	—	—	—	—	—	—	—		III
"My Cell"	2019	—	39	—	—	—	—	—	—	—	—		III
"Jimmy Sparks"	2019	—	42	—	—	—	—	—	—	—	—		III
"Birthday"	2022	—	36	—	—	—	—	—	—	—	—		Brightside
"Never Really Mine"	2022	—	38	—	—	—	—	—	—	—	—		Brightside
"Rollercoaster"	2022	—	43	—	—	—	—	—	—	—	—		Brightside
"Reprise"	2022	—	49	—	—	—	—	—	—	—	—		Brightside
"Spotless" (Zach Bryan featuring the Lumineers)	2023	17	3	79	15	46	128	28	—	6	39	RIAA: 2× Platinum; MC: Platinum; RMNZ: Gold	Zach Bryan
"Strings"	2025	—	49	—	—	—	—	—	—	—	—		Automatic
"Automatic"	2025	—	39	—	—	—	—	—	—	—	—		Automatic
"Plasticine"	2025	—	46	—	—	—	—	—	—	—	—		Automatic
"Ativan"	2025	—	42	—	—	—	—	—	—	—	—		Automatic
"—" denotes song that did not chart or was not released in that territory.

== Other appearances ==
List of non-single guest appearances, with other performing artists, showing year released and album name
Title	Year	Other artist(s)	Album
"Gale Song"	2013	—N/a	The Hunger Games: Catching Fire
"Nobody Knows"	2016	—N/a	Pete's Dragon
"Holdin' Out"	2016	—N/a	Storks
"Long Way to Go"	2023	Pink	Trustfall
"Spotless"	2023	Zach Bryan	Zach Bryan

== Music videos ==
List of music videos, showing year released and director
Title	Year	Director(s)
"Ho Hey"	2012	Ben Fee
"Stubborn Love"	2013	Isaac Ravishankara
"Submarines"	2013	Nicholas Sutton Bell
"Ophelia"	2016	Isaac Ravishankara
"Cleopatra"	2016	Isaac Ravishankara
"Angela"	2016	Isaac Ravishankara
"Patience"	2016	Isaac Ravishankara
"Sleep on the Floor"	2016	Isaac Ravishankara
"The Ballad of Cleopatra"	2016	Isaac Ravishankara
"Gloria"	2019	Kevin Phillips
"Donna"	2019	Kevin Phillips
"Life in the City"	2019	Kevin Phillips
"It Wasn't Easy to Be Happy for You"	2019	Kevin Phillips
"Leader of the Landslide"	2019	Kevin Phillips
"Left for Denver"	2019	Kevin Phillips
"My Cell"	2019	Kevin Phillips
"Jimmy Sparks"	2019	Kevin Phillips
"April"	2019	Kevin Phillips
"Salt and the Sea"	2019	Kevin Phillips
"Brightside"	2021	Kyle Thrash
"Big Shot"	2021	Nicholas Sutton Bell & Dylan Marko Bell
"A.M. Radio"	2021	Nicholas Sutton Bell
"Where We Are"	2022	Nicholas Sutton Bell & Dylan Marko Bell
"Same Old Song"	2025	Anaïs La Rocca
"Automatic"	2025	Anaïs La Rocca
