= Cleopatra World Tour =

2016–17 concert tour by the Lumineers

- Tour by The Lumineers
- Location: Europe; North America; Asia; Oceania; Africa
- Associated album: Cleopatra
- Start date: April 14, 2016
- End date: December 10, 2017
- Legs: 11
- No. of shows: 168
- Supporting acts: Langhorne Slim & The Law; Rayland Baxter; BØRNS; No Lawn Chairs; SOAK; Andrew Bird, Kaleo; Margaret Glaspy; Susto

The Lumineers concert chronology
- The Lumineers World Tour (2012–2013); Cleopatra World Tour (2016–2017); III: The World Tour (2019–20)

The Cleopatra World Tour was the second concert tour by American folk rock band the Lumineers, in support of their second studio album, Cleopatra (2016). The tour began in Bristol on April 14, 2016, and concluded on December 10, 2017, in Inglewood.

== Set list ==
This set list is from the concert on June 7, 2016 in Morrison, Colorado. It is not intended to represent all shows from the tour.

1. "Sleep on the Floor"
2. "Ophelia"
3. "Flowers in Your Hair"
4. "Classy Girls"
5. "Cleopatra"
6. "Dead Sea"
7. "Charlie Boy"
8. "Where the Skies Are Blue"
9. "Ain't Nobody's Problem"
10. "Subterranean Homesick Blues" (Bob Dylan cover)
11. "Slow It Down"
12. "Gun Song"
13. "Ho Hey"
14. "Angela"
15. "Big Parade"
16. "My Eyes"
17. "Patience"

Encore

18. "Long Way From Home"
19. "Submarines"
20. "In the Light"
21. "Stubborn Love"

== Opening acts ==
Several opening acts appeared throughout the tour, including Langhorne Slim & The Law, Rayland Baxter, BØRNS, No Lawn Chairs, SOAK. Andrew Bird, Kaleo, Margaret Glapsy, Susto were opened for their 2017 legs on select stops.

== Tour dates ==
The first round tour schedule was announced for 32 stops. Some stops for 2016 were announced, as was the band's first arena tour in 2017.

On February 27, 2017, the band announced that the tour was scheduled to end at their hometown Denver, Colorado with three shows at Fiddler's Green Amphitheatre in Greenwood Village. However, they continued to play more several shows. The band was invited by President Barack Obama to perform for South By South Lawn on October 3. Band members Wesley Schultz and Jeremiah Fraites played on a tribute concert Tower of Song: A Memorial Tribute to Leonard Cohen on November 6 at Bell Center in Montreal.

The Lumineers also was the opening act for U2 for their 2017 the Joshua Tree Tour, and Tom Petty and the Heartbreakers from May to August in 2017 on select shows.

Date	City	Country	Venue
Europe
April 14, 2016	Bristol	England	O_{2} Academy Bristol
April 15, 2016	Glasgow	Scotland	Barrowland Ballroom
April 18, 2016	Dublin	Ireland	Olympia Theatre
April 19, 2016	Manchester	England	Albert Hall
April 23, 2016	London	England	O_{2} Shepherd's Bush Empire
April 27，2016	Paris	France	Trianon
April 28, 2016	Brussels	Belgium	Ancienne Belgique
April 29, 2016	Amsterdam	Netherlands	Melkweg
May 2, 2016	Cologne	Germany	E-Werk
May 4, 2016	Hamburg	Germany	Große Freiheit 36
May 5, 2016 (Note: The concert of May 5, 2016 in Groningen, Netherlands at the Stadspark was a part of Bevrijdingsfestival Groningen 2016.)	Groningen	Netherlands	Stadspark
May 6, 2016	Berlin	Germany	Admiralspalast
May 8, 2016	Stockholm	Sweden	Berns Salonger
May 9, 2016	Oslo	Norway	Rockefeller Music Hall
May 10, 2016	Copenhagen	Denmark	Vega House of Music
North America
May 14, 2016 (Note: The concert of May 14, 2016 in Irvine, California at the Irvine Meadows was a part of KROQ Weenie Roast 2016.)	Irvine	United States	Irvine Meadows Amphitheatre
May 21, 2016	Houston	United States	White Oak Music Hall
May 22, 2016	Dallas	United States	Bomb Factory
May 25, 2016	Salt Lake City	United States	Red Butte Garden
May 27, 2016	San Diego	United States	Open Air Theatre
May 28, 2016	Santa Barbara	United States	Santa Barbara Bowl
May 29, 2016 (Note: The concert of May 29, 2016 in Napa, California at the Napa Valley Exposition was a part of BottleRock Napa Valley 2016.)	Napa	United States	Napa Valley Exposition
May 31, 2016	Portland	United States	Arlene Schnitzer Concert Hall
June 1, 2016	Vancouver	United States	Orpheum Theatre
June 3, 2016	Redmond	United States	Marymoor Park
June 7, 2016	Morrison	United States	Red Rocks Amphitheatre
June 10, 2016	Kansas City	United States	Power & Light District
June 11, 2016	Indianapolis	United States	Murat Theatre
June 12, 2016	St. Louis	United States	Peabody Opera House
June 14, 2016	Saint Paul	United States	Myth
June 15, 2016	Milwaukee	United States	Riverside Theater
June 17, 2016 (Note: The concert of June 17, 2016 in Camden, New Jersey at the BB&T Pavilion was a part of Radio 104.5 Birthday Show 2016.)	Camden	United States	BB&T Pavilion
June 18, 2016 (Note: The concert of June 18, 2016 in Tinley Park, Illinois at the Hollywood Casino Amphitheatre was a part of 101WKQX's Piqniq 2016.)	Tinley Park	United States	Hollywood Casino Amphitheatre
June 19, 2016	Chicago	United States	Chicago Theatre
Europe
June 24, 2016 (Note: The concert of June 24, 2016 in Pilton, England at the Worthy Farm was a part of Glastonbury Festival 2016.)	Pilton	England	Worthy Farm
June 26, 2016 (Note: The concert of June 26, 2016 in Barcelona, Spain at the Jardins del Palau Reial de Pedralbes was a part of Festival Jardins Pedralbes 2016.)	Barcelona	Spain	Jardins del Palau Reial de Pedralbes
June 27, 2016	Madrid	Spain	Real Jardín Botánico Alfonso XIII
North America
July 8, 2016 (Note: The concert of July 8, 2016 in Quebec City, Quebec at the Plaines d'Abraham was a part of Festival d'été de Québec 2016.)	Quebec City	Canada	Plaines d'Abraham
July 9, 2016 (Note: The concert of July 9, 2016 in Ottawa, Canada at the Le Breton Festival Park, was a part of Ottawa Bluesfest 2016.)	Ottawa	Canada	Le Breton Festival Park
Europe
July 14, 2016 (Note: The concert of July 14, 2016 in Bern, Switzerland at the Gurten, was a part of Gurtenfestival 2016.)	Bern	Switzerland	Gurten
July 15, 2016 (Note: The concert of July 15, 2016 in Dublin, Ireland at the Marlay Park, was a part of Longitude Festival 2016.)	Dublin	Ireland	Marlay Park
July 17, 2016 (Note: The concert of July 17, 2016 in Southwold, England at the Henham Park, was a part of Latitude Festival 2016.)	Southwold	England	Henham Park
July 19, 2016 (Note: The concert of July 19, 2016 in Nyon, Switzerland at the L'Asse, was a part of Paléo Festival 2016.)	Nyon	Switzerland	L'Asse
July 20, 2016	Gardone Riviera	Italy	Vittoriale degli Italiani
July 21, 2016 (Note: The concert of July 21, 2016 in Sesto al Reghena, Italy at the Sexto 'nplugged, was a part of Sexto 'nplugged 2016.)	Sesto Al Reghena	Italy	Sexto ‘NPlugged
North America
July 28, 2016	Toronto	Canada	Molson Amphitheatre
July 29, 2016 (Note: The concert of July 29, 2016 in Montreal, Quebec at the Parc Jean-Drapeau, was a part of Osheaga Festival 2016.)	Montreal	Canada	Parc Jean-Drapeau
July 30, 2016	Cooperstown	United States	Brewery Ommegang
August 2, 2016	Brooklyn	United States	Kings Theatre
August 3, 2016	Brooklyn	United States	Prospect Park Bandshell
August 5, 2016	Portland	United States	Thompson's Point
August 6, 2016	Asbury Park	United States	The Stone Pony
August 7, 2016 (Note: The concert of August 7, 2016 in Wappingers Falls, New York at the Dutchess County Airport, was a part of Speed of Sound Festival.)	Wappingers Falls	United States	Dutchess County Airport
Europe
August 16, 2016 (Note: The concert of August 16, 2016 in Budapest, Hungary at the Óbudai-Sziget, was a part of Sziget Festival 2016.)	Budapest	Hungary	Óbudai-Sziget
August 18, 2016 (Note: The concert of August 18, 2016 in St. Pölten, Austria at the Green Park, was a part of FM4 Frequency Festival 2016.)	St. Pölten	Austria	Green Park
August 19, 2016 (Note: The concert of August 19, 2016 in Hasselt, Belgium at the Kiewit, was a part of Pukkelpop 2016.)	Hasselt	Belgium	Kiewit
August 20, 2016 (Note: The concert of August 20, 2016 in Trondheim, Norway at the Marinen, was a part of Pstereo Festival 2016.)	Trondheim	Norway	Marinen
North America
September 3, 2016 (Note: The concert of September 3, 2016 in Calgary, Canada at the Fort Calgary, was a part of X-Fest 2016.)	Calgary	Canada	Fort Calgary
September 4, 2016 (Note: The concert of September 4, 2016 in Edmonton, Canada at the Borden Park, was a part of Sonic Boom Festival 2016.)	Edmonton	Canada	Borden Park
September 7, 2016	Boston	United States	Blue Hills Bank Pavilion
September 8, 2016	Boston	United States	Blue Hills Bank Pavilion
September 9, 2016	Philadelphia	United States	Mann Center
September 10, 2016	Columbia	United States	Merriweather Post Pavilion
September 13, 2016	Charlottesville	United States	Sprint Pavilion
September 15, 2016	Cary	United States	Koka Booth Amphitheatre
September 16, 2016	Richmond	United States	Richmond International Raceway
September 17, 2016	Charleston	United States	Family Circle Tennis Center
September 18, 2016 (Note: The concert of September 18, 2016 in Atlanta, Georgia at the Piedmont Park, was a part of Music Midtown 2016.)	Atlanta	United States	Piedmont Park
September 20, 2016 (Note: The concert of September 20, 2016 in Nashville, Tennessee at the Ascend Amphitheater, was a part of Americana Fest 2016.)	Nashville	United States	Ascend Amphitheater
September 22, 2016	Nashville	United States	Ascend Amphitheater
September 23, 2016	Louisville	United States	Waterfront Park
September 24, 2016	Rochester Hills	United States	Meadow Brook Amphitheatre
September 25, 2016 (Note: The concert of September 25, 2016 in Las Vegas, Nevada at the Downtown Las Vegas Fremont Street, was a part of Life Is Beautiful 2016.)	Las Vegas	United States	Downtown Las Vegas Fremont Street
September 29, 2016	Austin	United States	Austin360 Amphitheater
September 30, 2016	Oklahoma City	United States	Zoo Amphitheatre
October 1, 2016	Rogers	United States	Walmart Arkansas Music Pavilion
October 4, 2016	Phoenix	United States	Comerica Theatre
October 5, 2016	Los Angeles	United States	Hollywood Bowl
October 6, 2016	Berkeley	United States	Hearst Greek Theatre
October 7, 2016	Berkeley	United States	Hearst Greek Theatre
Europe
October 23, 2016	Manchester	England	O_{2} Apollo Manchester
October 24, 2016	Leeds	England	O_{2} Academy Leeds
October 26, 2016	Dublin	Ireland	3Arena
October 28, 2016	Edinburgh	Scotland	Usher Hall
October 29, 2016	Newcastle	England	O2 Academy Newcastle
October 30, 2016	Birmingham	England	O_{2} Academy Birmingham
November 1, 2016	Plymouth	England	Plymouth Pavilions
November 4, 2016	London	England	Eventim Apollo
November 5, 2016	London	England	Eventim Apollo
November 7, 2016	Amsterdam	Netherlands	Heineken Music Hall
November 8, 2016	Paris	France	Salle Pleyel
November 11, 2016	Wiesbaden	Germany	Schlachthof
November 12, 2016 (Note: The concert of November 12, 2016 in Esch Sur Alzette, Luxembourg at the Rockhal, was a part of Sonic Visions Festival 2016.)	Esch-sur-Alzette	Germany	Rockhal
November 14, 2016	Hamburg	Germany	Mehr! Theater
November 15, 2016	Berlin	Germany	Tempodrom
November 17, 2016	Warsaw	Poland	Palladium
November 20, 2016	Prague	Czech Republic	Palác Lucerna Velký Sál
November 21, 2016	Vienna	Austria	Planet.tt Bank Austria Halle
November 22, 2016	Munich	Germany	Kulturhalle Zenith
November 24, 2016	Zürich	Switzerland	X-tra
November 25, 2016	Milan	Italy	Fabrique
November 26, 2016	Bologna	Italy	Estragon
North America
December 6, 2016	San Francisco	United States	Great American Music Hall
December 7, 2016	Los Angeles	United States	The Fonda Theatre
January 17, 2017	Omaha	United States	CenturyLink Center
January 19, 2017	Minneapolis	United States	Target Center
January 20, 2017	Rosemont	United States	Allstate Arena
January 21, 2017	St. Louis	United States	Chaifetz Arena
January 24, 2017	Kansas City	United States	Sprint Center
January 26, 2017	Grand Rapids	United States	Van Andel Arena
January 27, 2017	Auburn Hills	United States	The Palace of Auburn Hills
January 28, 2017	Columbus	United States	Value City Arena
January 31, 2017	Cincinnati	United States	U.S. Bank Arena
February 2, 2017	New York City	United States	Madison Square Garden
February 3, 2017	New York City	United States	Madison Square Garden
February 28, 2017	Grand Prairie	United States	Verizon Theatre at Grand Prairie
March 2, 2017	Sugar Land	United States	Smart Financial Centre
March 3, 2017	New Orleans	United States	Kiefer UNO
March 5, 2017 (Note: The concert of March 5, 2017 in Okeechobee, Florida at the Rockhal, was a part of Okeechobee Music & Arts Festival 2017.)	Okeechobee	United States	Sunshine Grove
March 8, 2017	Duluth	United States	Infinite Energy Arena
March 10, 2017	Indianapolis	United States	Bankers Life Fieldhouse
March 11, 2017	Cleveland	United States	Wolstein Center
March 14, 2017	Pittsburgh	United States	Petersen Events Center
March 16, 2017	Uncasville	United States	Mohegan Sun Arena
March 18, 2017	Montreal	Canada	Bell Centre
March 19, 2017	Quebec City	Canada	Vidéotron Centre
March 21, 2017	Ottawa	Canada	Canadian Tire Centre
March 22, 2017	London	Canada	Budweiser Gardens
March 24, 2017	Des Moines	United States	Wells Fargo Arena
March 25, 2017	Milwaukee	United States	BMO Harris Bradley Center
March 26, 2017	Sioux City	United States	Orpheum Theater
March 28, 2017	Winnipeg	United States	MTS Centre
March 30, 2017	Saskatoon	Canada	SaskTel Centre
March 31, 2017	Edmonton	Canada	Rogers Place
Asia
April 10, 2017	Tokyo	Japan	Akasaka BLITZ
Oceania
April 14, 2017 (Note: The concert of April 14, 2017 in Byron Bay, Australia at the Tyagarah Tea Tree Farm, was a part of Byron Bay Bluesfest 2017.)	Byron Bay	Australia	Tyagarah Tea Tree Farm
April 17, 2017	Sydney	Australia	Sydney Opera House
April 18, 2017	Sydney	Australia	Sydney Opera House
April 19, 2017	Melbourne	Australia	The Arts Centre
April 22, 2017	Perth	Australia	Metro City Concert Club
Africa
April 26, 2017	Cape Town	South Africa]	Green Point Cricket Oval
April 28, 2017	Johannesburg	South Africa]	Ticketpro Dome
Europe
July 1, 2017 (Note: The concert of July 1, 2017 in Roskilde, Denmark at the Festivalpladsen, was a part of Roskilde Festival 2017.)	Roskilde	Denmark	Festivalpladsen
July 2, 2017 (Note: The concert of July 2, 2017 in Werchter, Belgium at the Werchterpark, was a part of Rock Werchter 2017.)	Werchter	Belgium	Werchterpark
July 3, 2017	Zurich	Switzerland	Volkshaus
July 6, 2017 (Note: The concert of July 6, 2017 in Madrid, Spain at the Caja Mágica, was a part of Mad Cool Festival 2017.)	Madrid	Spain	Caja Mágica
July 7, 2017 (Note: The concert of July 7, 2017 in Barcelona, Spain at the Parc del Fòrum, was a part of Cruïlla Barcelona 2017.)	Barcelona	Spain	Parc del Fòrum
July 9, 2017 (Note: The concert of July 9, 2017 in London, England at Hyde Park, was a part of British Summer Time 2017.)	London	England	Hyde Park
July 10, 2017 (Note: The concert of July 10, 2017 in Rome, Italy at the Cavea dell'Auditorium Parco della Musica, was a part of Luglio Suona Bene 2017.)	Rome	Italy	Cavea Amphitheater
July 11, 2017 (Note: The concert of July 11, 2017 in Ancona, Italy at the Mole Vanvitelliana, was a part of Spilla Festival 2017.)	Ancona	Italy	Mole Vanvitelliana
July 12, 2017	Villafranca di Verona	Italy	Castello Scaligero
July 14, 2017 (Note: The concert of July 14, 2017 in Montreux, Switzerland at the Auditorium Stravinski, was a part of Montreux Jazz Festival 2017.)	Montreux	Switzerland	Stravinski Auditorium
July 15, 2017 (Note: The concert of July 15, 2017 in Aix-les-Bains, France at the Esplanade du Lac, was a part of Musilac 2017.)	Aix-les-Bains	France	Esplanade du Lac
July 16, 2017 (Note: The concert of July 16, 2017 in Salacgriva, Latvia at the Zvejnieku parks, was a part of Positivus Festival 2017.)	Salacgriva	Latvia	Zvejnieku parks
North America
July 17, 2017 (Note: Opening for Tom Petty and the Heartbreakers)	Vancouver	Canada	Rogers Arena
July 19, 2017	Seattle	United States	Safeco Field
August 25, 2017	Greenwood Village	United States	Fiddler's Green Amphitheatre
August 26, 2017	Greenwood Village	United States	Fiddler's Green Amphitheatre
August 27, 2017	Greenwood Village	United States	Fiddler's Green Amphitheatre
September 23, 2017 (Note: The concert of September 23, 2017 in New York City, New York on the Great Lawn in Central Park, was a part of Global Citizen Festival 2017.)	New York	United States	Great Lawn in Central Park
November 29, 2017 (Note: The concert of November 29, 2017 in Washington, D.C. at The Anthem, was a part of TDC101 Office Party 2017.)	Washington, D.C.	United States	The Anthem
December 1, 2017	Jacksonville	United States	Jacksonville Veterans Memorial Arena
December 2, 2017 (Note: The concert of December 2, 2017 in Tampa, Florida at the MidFlorida Credit Union Amphitheatre, was a part of 97X Next Big Thing 2017.)	Tampa	United States	MidFlorida Credit Union Amphitheatre
December 5, 2017 (Note: The concert of December 5, 2017 in Seattle, Washington at the KeyArena, was a part of Deck the Hall Ball 2017.)	Seattle	United States	KeyArena
December 7, 2017 (Note: The concert of December 7, 2017 in Sacramento, California at the Golden 1 Center, was a part of Radio 94.7's Electric Christmas 2017.)	Sacramento	United States	Golden 1 Center
December 8, 2017 (Note: The concert of December 8, 2017 in Oakland, California at the Oracle Arena, was a part of Not So Silent Night 2017.)	Oakland	United States	Oracle Arena
December 9, 2017 (Note: The concert of December 9, 2017 in San Diego, California at the Valley View Casino Center, was a part of 91X Wrex the Halls 2017.)	San Diego	United States	Valley View Casino Center
December 10, 2017 (Note: The concert of December 10, 2017 in Inglewood, California at The Forum, was a part of KROQ Almost Acoustic Christmas 2017.)	Inglewood	United States	The Forum
