= Sleep on the Floor =

2016 song by The Lumineers

Single by The Lumineers

from the album Cleopatra
- Released: November 16, 2016
- Recorded: 2013–15
- Studio: Clubhouse Recording Studios
- Genre: Folk rock
- Length: 3:31
- Label: Dualtone Records
- Songwriters: Wesley Schultz; Jeremiah Fraites
- Producer: Simone Felice

The Lumineers singles chronology
"Angela (Live, 2016)" (2016)	"Sleep on the Floor" (2016)	"Blue Christmas" (2016)

Music video
- "Sleep on the Floor" on YouTube

"Sleep on the Floor" is a single by American folk rock band The Lumineers from their second studio album Cleopatra. The song was released on November 16, 2016, by Dualtone Records, with the accompanying music video being released the same day. The song was written by members Wesley Schultz and Jeremiah Fraites, and produced by Simone Felice.

== Music video ==
The official music video was released via the Lumineers' YouTube and Vevo accounts on November 16, 2016. As of November 2023, it has gained over 210 million views. The music video was directed by Isaac Ravishankara, who also directed The Ballad of Cleopatra videos compilation, starring Elise Eberle and Adam C. Lively. The music video was intended as, essentially, a trailer. The full movie was later released on Vimeo.

The clip begins with a scene of a girl attending her father's funeral, then her boyfriend tells her "If we don't leave now, you may never make it out". Then the girl goes with him into a car and they drive throughout all the state; after some mechanical problems with their car, they finally arrive at a house where they spend the night. The same night they get married; the music video ends with them going to sleep on the house's floor but when it dawns, she was the only one laying down on the floor. This means the rest of the video was what could’ve happened if she left with her boyfriend.

== Personnel ==
Credits adapted from Cleopatra liner notes.

The Lumineers

- Wesley Schultz – lead vocals, guitar
- Jeremiah Fraites – drums, percussion, piano
- Neyla Pekarek – cello, vocals

Additional Musicians

- Byron Isaacs – bass guitar, background vocalist
- Simon Felice – percussion
- David Baron – keyboards
- Lauren Jacobson – strings

Production

- Simone Felice – production
- Bod Ludwig – mastering
- Ryan Hewitt – mixing, recording
- Chad Cuttill – mixing assistance

Recording

- Recorded at Clubhouse Recording Studios
- Mixed at House of Blues Studios, Nashville, TN
- Mastered at Gateway Mastering

== Charts ==
=== Weekly charts ===
Chart (2016–17)	Peak position
Canada (Canadian Hot 100)	84
US Adult Alternative Songs (Billboard)	24
US Alternative Digital Songs Sales (Billboard)	20
US Hot Rock Songs (Billboard)	11
US Rock Digital Song Sales (Billboard)	32

=== Year-end charts ===
Chart (2017)	Position
US Hot Rock Songs (Billboard)	89

== Certifications ==
Region	Certification	Certified units/sales
Brazil (Pro-Música Brasil)	2× Platinum	120,000^{‡}
Canada (Music Canada)	Platinum	80,000^{‡}
New Zealand (RMNZ)	Platinum	30,000^{‡}
Poland (ZPAV)	Gold	25,000^{‡}
Portugal (AFP)	Gold	5,000^{‡}
Spain (Promusicae)	Gold	30,000^{‡}
United Kingdom (BPI)	Gold	400,000^{‡}
^{‡} Sales+streaming figures based on certification alone.

== Covers ==
The song was covered by Canadian singer-songwriter Dan Mangan, initially as a standalone single in February 2024 before being included on his "mixtape" album Being Elsewhere Mix in the fall.
