= Automatic (The Lumineers album) =

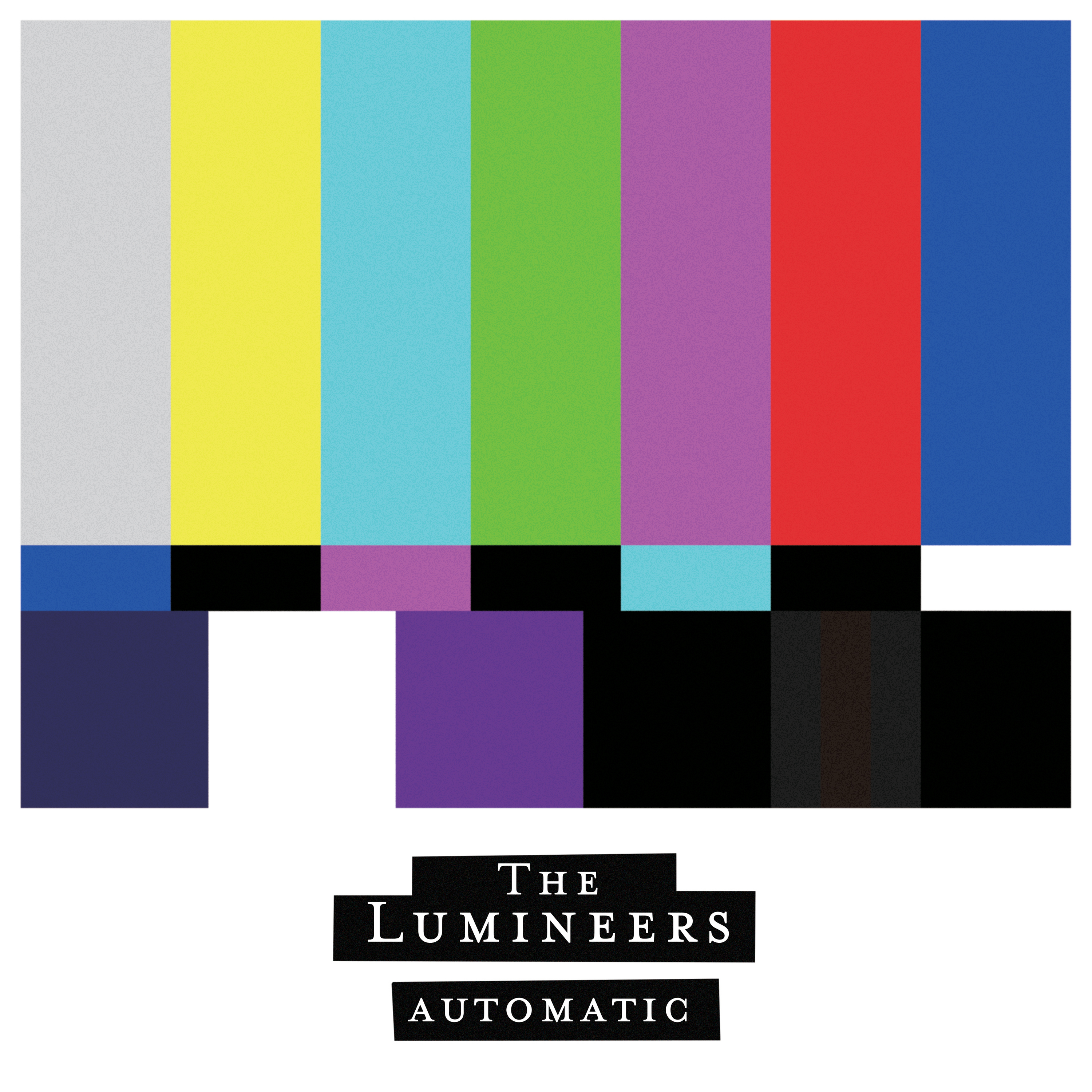
- Cover art featuring SMPTE color bars

Studio album by the Lumineers
- Released: February 14, 2025
- Studio: Utopia; Bearsville (Woodstock)
- Length: 32:34
- Label: Dualtone
- Producer: David Baron; Simone Felice; The Lumineers

The Lumineers chronology
Live from Wrigley Field (2024)	Automatic (2025)

Deluxe edition cover
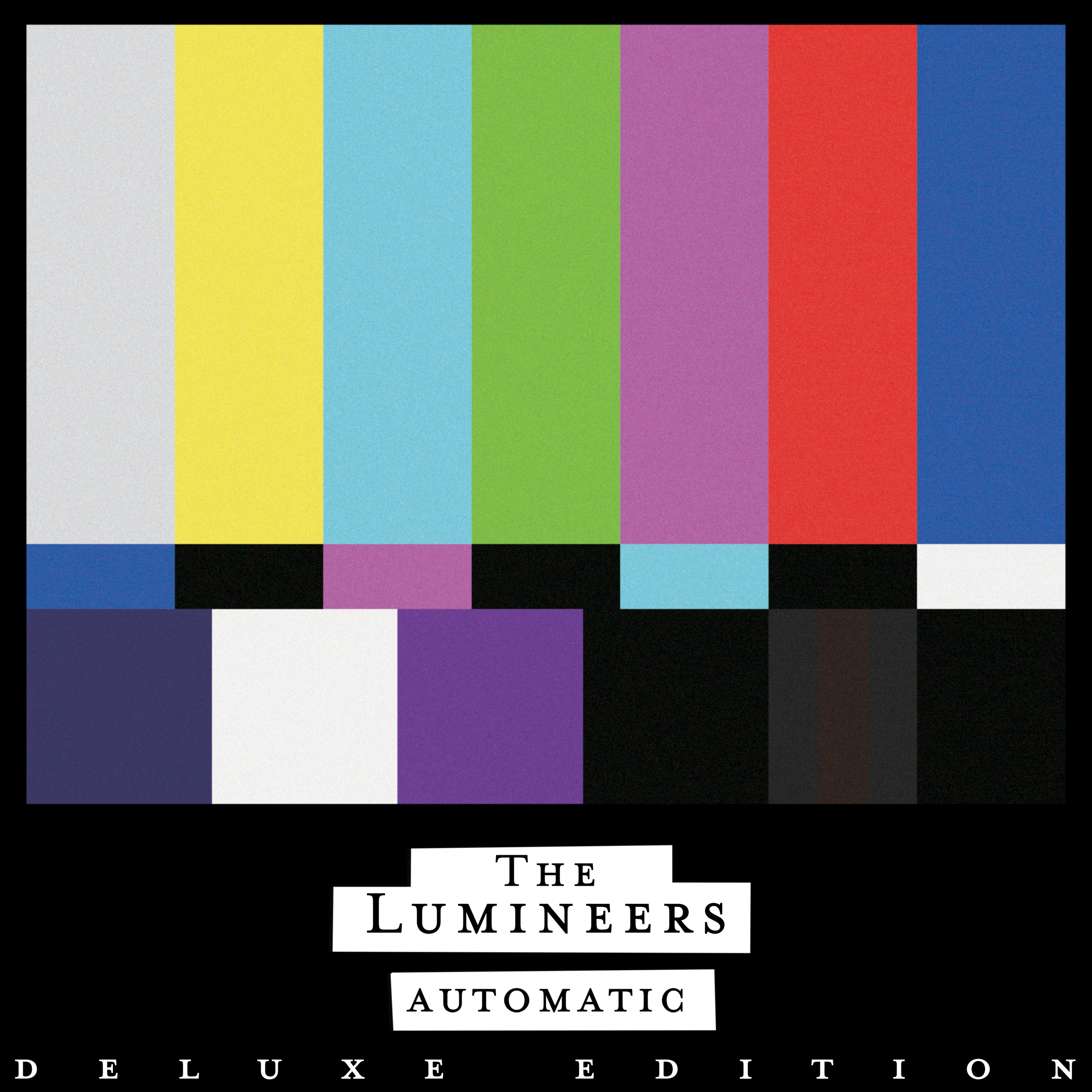

Singles from Automatic
- 1. "Same Old Song" Released: January 8, 2025; 2. "You're All I Got / So Long" Released: January 29, 2025

Automatic is the fifth studio album by American indie folk band the Lumineers. It was released on February 14, 2025, through Dualtone Records. The album was produced by David Baron, who produced the Lumineers' previous studio album, Brightside (2022).

== Background and recording ==
In a press release, band member Wesley Schultz revealed that the album was recorded at the Utopia studios in Woodstock, New York "in less than a month", and further elaborated that the album will "[explore] some of the absurdities of the modern world, like the increasingly blurry line between what's real and what's not, and the variety of ways we numb ourselves while trying to combat both boredom and overstimulation."

A day prior to the album's announcement, the Lumineers posted multiple images on social media that contain what fans speculated to be lyrics from the then-unannounced album over television test cards.

== Promotion ==
The lead single from Automatic, "Same Old Song", was released simultaneously with the album's announcement on January 8, 2025. It was accompanied by a music video for it directed by Anaïs LaRocca.

== Track listing ==
All tracks are written by Wesley Schultz and Jeremiah Fraites.

Automatic track listing
No.	Title	Length
1.	"Same Old Song"	2:54
2.	"Asshole"	3:03
3.	"Strings"	0:34
4.	"Automatic"	2:58
5.	"You're All I Got"	3:22
6.	"Plasticine"	2:50
7.	"Ativan"	3:42
8.	"Keys on the Table"	3:56
9.	"Better Day"	2:57
10.	"Sunflowers"	1:20
11.	"So Long"	4:58
Total length:		32:34

== Personnel ==
Credits adapted from the album's liner notes.

=== The Lumineers ===
- Wesley Schultz – lead vocals, background vocals, electric guitar, acoustic guitar, 12-string acoustic guitar, stomps, production
- Jeremiah Fraites – piano, electric guitar, acoustic guitar, synthesizers, drums, percussion, Rhodes, Mellotron, bass, sub-bass, programming, stomps

=== Additional contributors ===
- David Baron – production, mixing, engineering, B3, synthesizers
- Simone Felice – production, stomps, percussion, tambourine, background vocals
- Byron Isaacs – bass, upright bass, background vocals
- Megan Gould – violin, viola
- Marlon Saunders – background vocals
- Cindy Mizelle – background vocals
- Dorethea "Biti" Strauchan – background vocals
- Howie Weinberg – mastering
- Will Borza – mastering
- Brad Coletta – production assistance
- Renée Hikari – engineering assistance
- Stephen "Ruff" Stewart – guitar technician
- Derek Brown – drum technician
- Scott Andrews – piano technician
- Nicholas Sutton Bell – creative direction, photography

== Charts ==
Chart performance for Automatic
Chart (2025)	Peak position
Austrian Albums (Ö3 Austria)	47
Belgian Albums (Ultratop Flanders)	139
Canadian Albums (Billboard)	24
German Albums (Offizielle Top 100)	84
Irish Independent Albums (IRMA)	7
Scottish Albums (OCC)	15
Swiss Albums (Schweizer Hitparade)	60
UK Album Downloads (OCC)	11
UK Independent Albums (OCC)	8
US Billboard 200	16
US Independent Albums (Billboard)	2
US Top Rock & Alternative Albums (Billboard)	3
