= Gloria (The Lumineers song) =

Single by American folk rock band The Lumineers

Single by The Lumineers

from the album III
- Released: April 4, 2019
- Label: Dualtone; Decca
- Songwriters: Jeremiah Fraites; Wesley Schultz
- Producer: Simone Felice

Audio video
- "Gloria" on YouTube

"Gloria" is a single by American folk rock band The Lumineers from their third studio album III (2019). The song was released on April 4, 2019 by Dualtone Records and Decca Records, with the accompanying music video being released on May 20, 2019.

== Background And Composition ==
The song is the third track from their third studio album III, and was released as a single on April 4, 2019 by Dualtone and Decca Records.

“Gloria” has been described as folk rock and indie rock. Lyrically the song discusses the challenges a family faces with a member struggling from alcoholism.

== Charts ==
=== Weekly charts ===
Chart (2019)	Peak position
Scottish Singles Sales (Official Charts)	29
UK Singles Downloads (Official Charts)	41
US Digital Song Sales (Billboard)	31
US Hot Rock & Alternative Songs (Billboard)	5
US Rock & Alternative Airplay (Billboard)	1

=== Year-end charts ===
Chart (2019)	Position
US Adult Alternative Songs (Billboard)	3
US Alternative Songs (Billboard)	5
US Hot Rock Songs (Billboard)	10
US Rock Airplay Songs (Billboard)	7

== Certifications ==
Region	Certification	Certified units/sales
Canada (Music Canada)	Gold	40,000^{‡}
New Zealand (RMNZ)	Gold	15,000^{‡}
^{‡} Sales+streaming figures based on certification alone.

== Release history ==
Country	Date	Format	Label	Ref.
Various	April 4, 2019	Digital download; streaming	Dualtone; Decca	
