= Brightside (The Lumineers album) =

Studio album by the Lumineers
- Released: January 14, 2022
- Recorded: 2021
- Studio: Sun Mountain (Boiceville, New York)
- Length: 30:02
- Labels: Dualtone; Decca
- Producers: Simone Felice; David Baron; Brian Hubblen; Derek Brown; Rick Mullen

The Lumineers chronology
III (2019)	Brightside (2022)	Brightside Bonus Tracks (2022)

Singles from Brightside
- 1. "Brightside" Released: September 20, 2021; 2. "Big Shot" Released: October 13, 2021; 3. "A.M. Radio" Released: November 17, 2021

Brightside (stylized in all caps) is the fourth studio album by American indie folk band the Lumineers, released on January 14, 2022, through Dualtone and Decca Records. It was primarily produced by Simone Felice and David Baron. The album was preceded by the release of three singles: the title track, "Big Shot", and "A.M. Radio".

== Recording ==
Simone Felice, producer of the Lumineers' Cleopatra and III, returned to produce the album alongside David Baron, who also served as mixer and engineer. The album was recorded in two sessions that took place in early ("winter and spring") 2021 at Baron's Sun Mountain Studios in Boiceville, New York. Lead single "Brightside" was recorded in a single day.

Singer-guitarist Wesley Schultz and Jeremiah Fraites performed most of the instrumentation themselves, with Baron providing keyboards and backing vocals. Other contributions came from the Felice Brothers' James Felice, singer-songwriter Diana DeMuth, touring members Byron Isaacs and Lauren Jacobson, and backing singer Cindy Mizelle.

== Critical reception ==
Professional ratings
Aggregate scores
Source	Rating
Metacritic	72/100
Review scores
Source	Rating
AllMusic	4/5 stars
The Telegraph	4/5 stars

Upon release, Brightside received positive reviews from music critics. At Metacritic, which assigns a normalized score out of 100 to ratings from mainstream publications, the album received an weighted mean score of 72 based on four reviews, indicating "generally favorable reviews".

== Track listing ==
All tracks are written by Wesley Schultz and Jeremiah Fraites.

Brightside track listing
No.	Title	Length
1.	"Brightside"	3:49
2.	"A.M. Radio"	3:57
3.	"Where We Are"	2:52
4.	"Birthday"	4:14
5.	"Big Shot"	3:01
6.	"Never Really Mine"	3:01
7.	"Rollercoaster"	3:48
8.	"Remington"	1:52
9.	"Reprise"	3:28
Total length:		30:02

Notes

- All tracks in the standard track listing are stylized in all caps.

== Personnel ==
Credits adapted from the media notes of Brightside.

The Lumineers

- Wesley Schultz – lead vocals, electric guitar, acoustic guitar
- Jeremiah Fraites – piano, drums, drum programming, Firewood, Rhodes, electric guitar, tambourine, electric bass, glockenspiel

Additional musicians

- Simone Felice – background vocals, tambourine, claps, maracas
- David Baron – synthesizers, Rhodes, sub bass, Hammond B3, minimoog, mellotron
- Lauren Jacobson – violin, background vocals
- Byron Isaacs – bass, background vocals
- Diana DeMuth – background vocals
- James Felice – background vocals
- Cindy Mizelle – background vocals
- Alex Waterman – cello
- Palenville Firehouse – siren

Production

- Simone Felice – producer
- David Baron – producer, mixing, engineering
- Andrew Mendelson – mastering
- Taylor Chadwick – assistant engineer
- Andrew Darby – assistant engineer
- Bobbi Giel – assistant engineer
- Luke Armentrout – assistant engineer
- Renée Hikari – studio assistant
- Brian Hubble – piano technician
- Rick Mullen – guitar technician
- Derek Brown – drum technician
- Sara Full – studio coordinator
- Anthony Hook – Sara Full's assistant

Artwork

- Nicholas Sutton Bell – creative director, photographer

== Charts ==
Chart performance for Brightside
Chart (2022)	Peak position
Australian Albums (ARIA)	94
Austrian Albums (Ö3 Austria)	21
Belgian Albums (Ultratop Flanders)	32
Belgian Albums (Ultratop Wallonia)	45
Canadian Albums (Billboard)	5
French Albums (SNEP)	128
German Albums (Offizielle Top 100)	30
Irish Albums (IRMA)	54
Scottish Albums (Official Charts)	8
Spanish Albums (Promusicae)	69
Swiss Albums (Schweizer Hitparade)	17
UK Albums (Official Charts)	18
US Billboard 200	6
US Top Alternative Albums (Billboard)	1
US Top Rock Albums (Billboard)	1
