= III (The Lumineers album) =

Studio album by the Lumineers
- Released: September 13, 2019
- Studios: The Clubhouse (Rhinebeck, NY); Three Flights Studios (Denver); F.A.M.E.S. Project (Skopje, Macedonia); The Pierce Rooms (London); Flying Elephants (New York City)
- Genre: Folk
- Length: 37:47
- Labels: Dualtone; Decca
- Producer: Simone Felice

The Lumineers chronology
Cleopatra (2016)	III (2019)	Brightside (2022)

Singles from III
- 1. "Gloria" Released: April 4, 2019; 2. "It Wasn't Easy to Be Happy for You" Released: July 19, 2019; 3. "Salt and the Sea" Released: April 13, 2020

III is the third studio album by American indie folk band the Lumineers, released by Dualtone on September 13, 2019. The album was accompanied by a feature-length film directed by Kevin Phillips.

== Background ==
In addition to being the Lumineers' third album, the album title also references the fact that the album is presented in three chapters, each focusing on a different main character of the fictional Sparks family. Lumineers co-founder Jeremiah Fraites told Rolling Stone, "This collection of songs worked out in a beautiful way, and I feel with this album we've really hit our stride." In an interview with NPR, Fraites and Schultz both discussed how their lives have been impacted by drug addiction, saying that this album was intended to chronicle the effects of addiction on family members and loved ones. "Schultz says he had a childhood friend in New Jersey who slowly came apart as a teenager because of drug addiction. Both band members experienced this because Schultz's friend, Josh Fraites, was the brother of his future bandmate, Jeremiah."

== Release ==
=== Film ===
The album was supported by a 44-minute visual accompaniment, written by Schultz with director Kevin Phillips. The film follows three generations of the working class Sparks family as they struggle with addiction and dysfunction in the Northeastern United States. The cast includes Anna Cordell, Nick Stahl, Charlie Tahan and Joshua Close. It was released online in ten-minute pieces between May 21 and September 19, 2019.

=== Commercial performance ===
III debuted at number two on the US Billboard 200 with 86,000 album-equivalent units, including 73,000 pure album sales. On August 21, 2026, the album was certified Gold by the Recording Industry Association of America (RIAA). It is the Lumineers' third top-two album in the US.

== Critical reception ==
Professional ratings
Aggregate scores
Source	Rating
Metacritic	72/100
Review scores
Source	Rating
AllMusic	3.5/5 stars
Gigwise	7/10 stars

Stephen Thomas Erlewine of AllMusic wrote, "III moves at a deliberate, nearly dreary pace that forces a listener to pay attention, and while it can take some effort to meet the Lumineers on their own terms, it's nevertheless easy to admire the ambition behind the project."

== Track listing ==
All tracks are written by Wesley Schultz and Jeremiah Fraites except where noted.

Chapter I: Gloria Sparks
No.	Title	Length
1.	"Donna"	3:05
2.	"Life in the City"	3:51
3.	"Gloria"	3:36

Chapter II: Junior Sparks
No.	Title	Length
4.	"It Wasn't Easy to Be Happy for You"	3:34
5.	"Leader of the Landslide"	5:54
6.	"Left for Denver"	3:16

Chapter III: Jimmy Sparks
No.	Title	Length
7.	"My Cell"	3:16
8.	"Jimmy Sparks"	5:55
9.	"April"	0:50
10.	"Salt and the Sea"	4:30
Total length:		37:47

Bonus tracks
No.	Title	Writer(s)	Length
11.	"Democracy"	Leonard Cohen	6:44
12.	"Old Lady"		4:17
13.	"Soundtrack Song"		2:01
Total length:			50:49

== Personnel ==
The Lumineers

- Wesley Schultz − vocals, guitar, production (6, 11, 12, 13), engineering
- Jeremiah Fraites − drums, piano, guitar, background vocals, synthesizer, vibraphone, cymbals, scraper, tambourine, production (6, 11, 12, 13), engineering

Additional musicians

- Byron Isaacs − bass, background vocals
- Lauren Jacobson − violin, background vocals
- Simone Felice − maracas, background vocals
- David Baron − synthesizer, keyboards, harmonium
- Anneke Schaul-Yoder − cello

Technical

- Simone Felice – producer (1–10)
- Bob Ludwig – mastering
- David Baron – mixing (1, 3–6, 8–10, 12, 13), engineering
- Ryan Hewitt – mixing (2, 7, 11), engineering
- Alen Adzi Stefanov – engineering
- Darren Heelis – engineering
- Pete Hanlon – engineering
- Connor Milton – assistant engineer
- Will Duperier – assistant engineer
- Dylan Nowik – assistant

Design

- Nicholas Sutton Bell – creative director
- Tomas Cristobal Patlan – portrait photography
- Kevin Phillips – additional photography
- Max Knies – additional photography

== Charts ==
=== Weekly charts ===
Chart (2019)	Peak position
Australian Albums (ARIA)	23
Austrian Albums (Ö3 Austria)	26
Belgian Albums (Ultratop Flanders)	34
Belgian Albums (Ultratop Wallonia)	94
Canadian Albums (Billboard)	2
Dutch Albums (Album Top 100)	36
French Albums (SNEP)	122
German Albums (Offizielle Top 100)	40
Irish Albums (IRMA)	11
Italian Albums (FIMI)	63
Lithuanian Albums (AGATA)	44
Scottish Albums (Official Charts)	4
Spanish Albums (PROMUSICAE)	38
Swiss Albums (Schweizer Hitparade)	10
UK Albums (Official Charts)	8
US Billboard 200	2
US Top Alternative Albums (Billboard)	1
US Americana/Folk Albums (Billboard)	1
US Top Rock Albums (Billboard)	1

=== Year-end charts ===
Chart (2019)	Position
US Folk Albums (Billboard)	17
US Independent Albums (Billboard)	7
US Top Rock Albums (Billboard)	46

Chart (2020)	Position
US Top Rock Albums (Billboard)	72
