= Sick in the Head =

"Sick in the Head" may refer to:

- "Sick in the Head", an episode of Undeclared
- "Sick in the Head", a song by the Lumineers from the 2016 album Cleopatra
