= Katherine McHale Slaughterback =

Woman who killed 140 snakes (1893-1969)

- Slaughterback in 1926 wearing her rattlesnake skin dress
- Born: Katherine McHale Garner; July 25, 1893 near Longmont, Colorado, United States
- Died: October 6, 1969 (aged 76); Weld County General Hospital, Greeley, Colorado, United States
- Known for: Once killing 140 rattlesnakes
- Spouse: 6, including Jack Slaughterback
- Children: Ernie Adamson

Katherine McHale Slaughterback (July 25, 1893 – October 6, 1969), popularly called Rattlesnake Kate, but also known as Kate Garner, was a woman from Colorado. She garnered fame for an incident in which she killed 140 rattlesnakes.

== Early life ==
Katherine McHale Slaughterback was born on July 25, 1893 (or 1894) in a log cabin near Longmont, Colorado.

Slaughterback attended nursing school at St. Joseph's School of Nursing and moved to Hudson, Colorado. She was a skilled taxidermist and frequently wore pants instead of dresses, which was unusual for women of her era.

Slaughterback married and divorced six times—one of her husbands was Jack Slaughterback. She had one son, Ernie Adamson.

== Rattlesnake namesake ==
On October 28, 1925, Slaughterback singlehandedly killed 140 rattlesnakes. Slaughterback and her son Ernie were on horseback headed to a lake near her farm. Hunters had been there the day before, and she was hoping to find harvested ducks left behind. However, she instead found over 100 migrating rattlesnakes. She shot the snakes until she ran out of ammunition for her .22 caliber Remington rifle, at which point she grabbed a nearby sign (allegedly, it said "No Hunting") and bludgeoned the remaining snakes to death.

Of her ordeal, Slaughterback later said:

I fought them with a club not more than 3 feet long, whirling constantly for over two hours before I could kill my way out of them and get back to my faithful horse and Ernie, who were staring at me during my terrible battle not more than 60 feet away

She was "frantic that [the snakes] would frighten the horse, and cause him to rear up and throw Ernie into the snakes." After she returned to her farm, a neighbor learned of what had happened, which eventually led to a reporter coming to photograph and interview her. She strung the dead snakes together on a rope for the photograph, which became infamous. She would later make herself a dress, shoes, and belt from the snakeskins. The dress, made from the skins of 53 rattlesnakes, was particularly famous. She claimed later that she received an offer from the Smithsonian Institution to buy it for US$2,000.

Her story became popular and was written about it the New York Evening Journal. News of her exploits was reported as far away as Germany, Belgium, Scotland, France, England, Mexico, and Canada.

Later in life, Slaughterback raised rattlesnakes, milking them for their venom and selling it to scientists in California. Three weeks before her death, Slaughterback donated her famous rattlesnake skin dress to the Greeley Municipal Museum; Ernie donated more of her possessions after her death, including her Remington rifle.

== Later life and death ==
Slaughterback was a nurse during World War II and served in the Pacific Theater. She lived in El Paso, Texas for a few years. She died on 6 October 1969, and was buried in Mizpah Cemetery in Platteville, Colorado. On her headstone, her name simply reads "Rattlesnake Kate," per her request. She was survived by her son, two grandsons, and two great-grandchildren.

== In modern culture ==
Former member of The Lumineers and Colorado native Neyla Pekarek wrote a folk opera about Slaughterback called Rattlesnake Kate. Pekarek was then commissioned by the Denver Center for the Performing Arts to create a full musical from the subject matter.
