= Ophelia (The Lumineers song) =

Single by the Lumineers

from the album Cleopatra
- Released: February 5, 2016
- Recorded: 2015
- Genre: Folk rock; Americana
- Length: 2:40
- Label: Dualtone Records
- Songwriters: Wesley Schultz; Jeremy Fraites
- Producer: Simone Felice

The Lumineers singles chronology
"Submarines" (2013)	"Ophelia" (2016)	"Cleopatra" (2016)

"Ophelia" is a song recorded by American folk rock band the Lumineers. It was released as the lead single from their sophomore album Cleopatra on February 5, 2016.

== Background ==
The song started as a slower instrumental demo that Jeremiah Fraites (one sixth of the Lumineers) sent to Wesley Schultz (lead vocalist of the Lumineers) in 2011. According to Schultz, the demo generated enough excitement to work on the project. While playing at a backbar in LA alongside the Lumineers, Schultz wrote the song's hook.

Soon after, the Lumineers felt they needed to find a proper substitute for the name Ophelia, since a song of the same name had been released years prior by The Band. Nevertheless, this issue reached its end after Schultz decided that no other name had "the right musicality to it." Subsequently, Schultz had trouble writing "good" verses to carry the hook he wrote, which made the songwriting process so difficult that the project was shelved until four years later. In January 2015, when it came time to work on a new record, the defunct "Ophelia" was resurrected.

"I remember thinking, 'Oh, it's so Ophelia.' So maybe I'll go back and rehandle it, and I'll figure out how to tell the story of Hamlet combined with something else."

— Wesley Schultz of the Lumineers

Over a series of vocal demos, the song was recorded at The Clubhouse in Rhinebeck, New York.

On February 8, 2016, via Facebook, the single's cover art was premiered, along with an 18-second-long snippet of the song.

In an interview with Entertainment Weekly, Schultz said that the song's lyrics are "a vague reference to people falling in love with fame."

Chinese pair skaters Peng Cheng and Jin Yang used the song for their short program during the 2018-19 season, winning a silver medal at the 2018 Grand Prix Final and placing fourth at the 2019 World Championships.

== Critical reception ==
The song has received mixed reviews from music critics. The song was praised by Marina Watts of The Cornell Daily Sun; where Watts refers to "Ophelia" as "hauntingly beautiful", also noting that the song is "a march that wishes anyone who ever falls in love the best of luck." David Dye of NPR also viewed "Ophelia" positively, while comparing its musical influences and style to the Lumineers' earlier hit, "Ho Hey".

In a negative review, Brunna Pimentel wrote for The Edge, she claimed to be disappointed with the song, stating that it "might have been an okay track for the middle of the album," but "as a single, it is undoubtedly anti-climatic. [sic]" Pimentel also criticized the song for its "repetitive" chorus.

== Music video ==
The official music video was directed by Isaac Ravishankara, and released via the Lumineers' YouTube and Vevo accounts on February 12, 2016. As of January 2022, it has gained over 200 million views.

=== The Ballad of Cleopatra ===
The Ballad of Cleopatra is a compilation of the story in the music videos for "Ophelia", "Cleopatra", "Sleep on the Floor", "Angela", and "My Eyes", all songs from the album Cleopatra. The video was released on the Lumineers YouTube channel on April 27, 2017.

== Live performances ==
On April 7, 2016, the Lumineers performed "Ophelia" on The Tonight Show with Jimmy Fallon. The Lumineers also performed the song on Good Morning America on April 13, their first time on the show. A live performance of the song at the iHeartRadio music theater in Los Angeles was aired on Audience Network at 9pm on April 8. On December 12, 2021, the Lumineers and Arkells performed a snippet of the song during the halftime show of the CFL Grey Cup in Hamilton, Ontario.

== Track listing ==
Digital download
No.	Title	Length
1.	"Ophelia"	2:40

== Personnel ==
- Wesley Schultz – lead vocals, songwriting, tambourine, stomping
- Jeremiah Fraites – songwriting, piano, stomping, drums
- Byron Isaacs – bass
- Ryan Hewitt – engineering, grand piano
- Simone Felice – production, stomping

== Charts ==
=== Weekly charts ===
Chart (2016–2024)	Peak position
Belgium (Ultratop 50 Flanders)	84
Canada Hot 100 (Billboard)	33
Canada Rock (Billboard)	4
France (SNEP)	188
Ireland (IRMA)	28
Sweden Heatseeker (Sverigetopplistan)	16
Switzerland (Schweizer Hitparade)	49
UK Singles (OCC)	52
US Billboard Hot 100	66
US Adult Pop Airplay (Billboard)	30
US Hot Rock & Alternative Songs (Billboard)	7
US Rock & Alternative Airplay (Billboard)	2

=== Year-end charts ===
Chart (2016)	Position
US Hot Rock Songs (Billboard)	11
US Rock Airplay Songs (Billboard)	1
Chart (2017)	Position
US Hot Rock Songs (Billboard)	24
US Rock Airplay Songs (Billboard)	34

=== Decade-end charts ===
Chart (2010–2019)	Position
US Hot Rock Songs (Billboard)	50

=== All-time charts ===
Chart (1995–2021)	Position
US Adult Alternative Airplay (Billboard)	49

== Certifications ==
Region	Certification	Certified units/sales
Australia (ARIA)	Platinum	70,000^{‡}
Brazil (Pro-Música Brasil)	Platinum	60,000^{‡}
Canada (Music Canada)	8× Platinum	640,000^{‡}
Denmark (IFPI Danmark)	Platinum	90,000^{‡}
France (SNEP)	Gold	66,666^{‡}
Germany (BVMI)	Gold	200,000^{‡}
Italy (FIMI)	2× Platinum	200,000^{‡}
New Zealand (RMNZ)	4× Platinum	120,000^{‡}
Poland (ZPAV)	Platinum	20,000^{‡}
Spain (Promusicae)	Platinum	60,000^{‡}
United Kingdom (BPI)	2× Platinum	1,200,000^{‡}
United States (RIAA)	4× Platinum	4,000,000^{‡}
^{‡} Sales+streaming figures based on certification alone.
