= Cleopatra (The Lumineers song) =

Single by the Lumineers

from the album Cleopatra
- Released: March 25, 2016
- Recorded: 2015
- Genre: Folk rock
- Length: 3:21
- Label: Dualtone
- Songwriters: Wesley Schultz; Jeremiah Fraites; Simone Felice
- Producer: Simone Felice

The Lumineers singles chronology
"Ophelia" (2016)	"Cleopatra" (2016)	"Angela" (2016)

"Cleopatra" is a song recorded by American folk rock band the Lumineers. The song serves as the title track to their second studio album of the same name.

"Cleopatra" was released as the album's second single on March 25, 2016.

== Background and composition ==
According to Wesley Schultz, lead vocalist of the Lumineers, "Cleopatra" tells the life story of a female taxi driver, named Manana, in the Republic of Georgia. While Schultz's wife was working on her college thesis in the country, the couple came across Manana, who became the first female taxi driver in Georgia. He describes her as a "badass lady - she’ll pick you up at the airport with a cigarette hanging out her mouth and a beer can between [her] legs." Schultz was inspired by her realism, in contrast to the false imagery of contemporary Instagram culture. He also admired her lack of self-pity and "willingness to confront life."

The song opens with the line "I was Cleopatra, I was young and an actress," which is meant to refer to the archetype of the Egyptian queen. The lyric reflects the "destiny idea of greatness" that comes with youth, and how she aspired to be a "force of nature." It was meant to capture the "overflowing" confidence that Manana possessed, and how in retrospect, it became merely a mask of identity. The song outlines Manana's ill-fated love, which ended after her father's death. At sixteen, she withheld an answer to her lover's proposal in the midst of grief, and he promptly departed from their small village. The lyrics also mention the lover leaving on a rainy day, tracking mud into the room, which the driver refused to wash off. The ballad concludes tragically, with the narrator alluding to her eventual death from old age after being "forever late to her own life.” Musically, "Cleopatra" contains hand-claps and "mounting harmonies," as well as strumming guitar and an "easy, natural flow." The titular track is the third on Cleopatra, and was described by Schultz as the "bedrock of the album.”

== Release and reception ==
On March 24, 2016, Zane Lowe premiered the song on Beats 1 Radio. "Cleopatra" reached number one on Billboard's Alternative Airplay chart, and reached number three on the Mainstream Rock chart.

Renowned for Sound dubbed "Cleopatra" a suitably named titular track, writing that it was the "perfect taste of the material" on the album "with its slow building beat, infectious chorus and an intriguing tale.” The Daily Texan thought the female-perspective lyricism "riveting" and labelled the song the "record’s standout.” Consequence opined that “the melody is Billboard-friendly, but the wistful tale of a bitter, aging woman looking back on her life and loves isn’t usually Billboard’s style."

== Music video ==
The official music video was directed by Isaac Ravishankara, and uploaded to the Lumineers' YouTube and VEVO account on July 7, 2016. It acts as the conclusion to the storyline that began with Sleep on the Floor music video and continued in the video for Angela. Since being uploaded, it has garnered over 77 million views.

=== The Ballad of Cleopatra ===
The Ballad of Cleopatra is a compilation of the story in the music videos for "Ophelia", "Cleopatra", "Sleep on the Floor", "Angela" and "My Eyes", all songs from the album Cleopatra. The video was released on the Lumineers YouTube channel on April 27, 2017.

== Live performances ==
The Lumineers performed the song live at the iHeartRadio music theater in LA. The performance was officially aired on Audience Network at 9pm on April 8, 2016. Although, a video for the performance was uploaded to the Lumineers' YouTube and VEVO account beforehand.

== Track listing ==
Digital download
No.	Title	Length
1.	"Cleopatra"	3:21

== Covers ==
The song has been covered numerous times since its release, by many upcoming artists which include: Daniel Robinson, Ellysse Mason, Josh Brown, Natalie Del Carmen, and Shayna Adler.

== Charts ==
=== Weekly charts ===
Chart (2016–17)	Peak position
Canada Hot 100 (Billboard)	80
Canada Rock (Billboard)	14
Scottish Singles Sales (Official Charts)	56
UK Singles Downloads (Official Charts)	90
US Bubbling Under Hot 100 (Billboard)	21
US Hot Rock & Alternative Songs (Billboard)	11
US Rock & Alternative Airplay (Billboard)	3

=== Year-end charts ===
Chart (2016)	Position
US Hot Rock Songs (Billboard)	39
Chart (2017)	Position
US Hot Rock Songs (Billboard)	38
US Rock Airplay Songs (Billboard)	18

== Certifications ==
Region	Certification	Certified units/sales
Brazil (Pro-Música Brasil)	Gold	30,000^{‡}
Canada (Music Canada)	Platinum	80,000^{‡}
France (SNEP)	Gold	100,000^{‡}
New Zealand (RMNZ)	Gold	15,000^{‡}
United Kingdom (BPI)	Silver	200,000^{‡}
^{‡} Sales+streaming figures based on certification alone.
