= Angela (The Lumineers song) =

Single by The Lumineers

from the album Cleopatra
- Released: April 1, 2016
- Recorded: 2015
- Genre: Folk rock
- Length: 3:21
- Label: Dualtone
- Songwriters: Wesley Schultz; Simone Felice; Jeremiah Fraites
- Producer: Simone Felice

The Lumineers singles chronology
"Cleopatra" (2016)	"Angela" (2016)	"Sleep on the Floor" (2016)

Alternative cover
- "Angela Live, 2016" cover

"Angela" is a song recorded by American folk rock band The Lumineers for their second studio album, Cleopatra, and released as the album's third single on April 1, 2016.

== Background ==
The Lumineers have said that the song "Angela," is about "a small town success story struggling to escape her past." During an interview, The Lumineers also mentioned how the name "Angela" comes from lead singer Wesley Schultz's ex-girlfriend Angela Henard; noting:

"Although we didn't work out she still holds a place in my heart. This is why she is brought up in multiple songs."

— Wesley Schultz, (the band's lead vocalist).

Through Facebook, The Lumineers premiered a twenty-one second long snippet of a live performance of the song on April 1, 2016.

== Music video ==
The official music video was released via the Lumineers' YouTube and Vevo accounts on September 13, 2016. As of September, 2021, it has gained over 55 million views.

=== The Ballad of Cleopatra ===
The Ballad of Cleopatra is a compilation of the story in the music videos for "Ophelia", "Cleopatra", "Sleep on the Floor", "Angela" and "My Eyes", all songs from the album Cleopatra. The video was released on the Lumineers YouTube channel on April 27, 2017.

== Live performances ==
On April 1, 2016, The Lumineers premiered the song "Angela," with a live performance at the iHeartRadio music theater in LA. The performance was aired on Audience Network, at 9pm on April 8, 2016. The Lumineers also performed the song for KEXP at the Columbia City Theater; and on April 16, 2016, they performed the song for The Saturday Sessions, a weekly music slot featured on the daily morning news program, CBS This Morning. They also performed the song at the 2016 Americana Music Honors & Awards.

== Track listing ==
Digital download
No.	Title	Length
1.	"Angela"	3:21

== Charts ==
=== Weekly charts ===
Chart (2016–2017)	Peak position
Canada Hot 100 (Billboard)	92
France (SNEP)	138
Switzerland Airplay (Schweizer Hitparade)	73
US Hot Rock & Alternative Songs (Billboard)	15
US Adult Alternative Airplay (Billboard)	3
US Alternative Airplay (Billboard)	6
US Rock & Alternative Airplay (Billboard)	7

=== Year-end charts ===
Chart (2016)	Position
US Adult Alternative Songs (Billboard)	15
US Hot Rock Songs (Billboard)	39
Chart (2017)	Position
US Adult Alternative Songs (Billboard)	13
US Alternative Songs (Billboard)	27
US Hot Rock Songs (Billboard)	14
US Rock Airplay Songs (Billboard)	28

== Certifications ==
Region	Certification	Certified units/sales
Canada (Music Canada)	Platinum	80,000^{‡}
New Zealand (RMNZ)	Gold	15,000^{‡}
United Kingdom (BPI)	Silver	200,000^{‡}
^{‡} Sales+streaming figures based on certification alone.
