= Stubborn Love (song) =

Single by the Lumineers

from the album The Lumineers
- Released: October 3, 2012
- Recorded: 2011
- Genre: Indie folk
- Length: 4:39 (LP Version); 4:14 (Radio Edit)
- Label: Dualtone Records
- Songwriters: Wesley Schultz, Jeremy Fraites
- Producer: Ryan Hadlock

The Lumineers singles chronology
| "Ho Hey" (2012) | "Stubborn Love" (2012) | "Submarines" (2013) |

"Stubborn Love" is a song by American folk rock band the Lumineers. It was released in 2012 as the second single from their debut self-titled studio album.

== Music video ==
There are 2 music videos for "Stubborn Love". The first one released on October 3, 2012 is a collection of live performances and behind the scenes footage shot between April and August 2012 during the Lumineers Big Parade 2012 tour. The 2nd one released on February 7, 2013 centers around a young daughter who is going with her mother as a result of her parents divorcing. As situations in their road trip go from gray and stormy to bright and sunny, the girl rolls down her window and smiles in the end of the video. The Lumineers themselves make a brief appearance as street performers.

== Charts ==
=== Weekly charts ===
| Chart (2012–13) | Peak position |
|---|---|
| Belgium (Ultratip Bubbling Under Flanders) | 67 |
| Belgium (Ultratip Bubbling Under Wallonia) | 32 |
| Canada Hot 100 (Billboard) | 60 |
| Canada Rock (Billboard) | 16 |
| Ireland (IRMA) | 84 |
| Japan Hot 100 (Billboard) | 94 |
| Italy (FIMI) | 101 |
| US Billboard Hot 100 | 70 |
| US Hot Rock & Alternative Songs (Billboard) | 10 |
| US Rock & Alternative Airplay (Billboard) | 5 |

=== Year-end charts ===
| Chart (2013) | Position |
|---|---|
| US Hot Rock Songs (Billboard) | 23 |
| US Adult Alternative Songs (Billboard) | 1 |
| US Alternative Songs (Billboard) | 14 |
| US Rock Airplay (Billboard) | 13 |

=== All-time charts ===
All-time chart performance for "Stubborn Love"
| Chart | Position |
|---|---|
| US Adult Alternative Airplay (Billboard) | 18 |

== Certifications ==
| Region | Certification | Certified units/sales |
|---|---|---|
| Brazil (Pro-Música Brasil) | Gold | 30,000^{‡} |
| Canada (Music Canada) | 2× Platinum | 160,000^{‡} |
| Italy (FIMI) | Gold | 25,000^{‡} |
| New Zealand (RMNZ) | Platinum | 30,000^{‡} |
| United Kingdom (BPI) | Gold | 400,000^{‡} |
| United States (RIAA) | Platinum | 1,000,000^{‡} |
^{‡} Sales+streaming figures based on certification alone.

== Release history ==
Release dates and formats for "Stubborn Love"
| Region | Date | Format | Label(s) | Ref. |
|---|---|---|---|---|
| United States | April 2, 2013 | Mainstream airplay | Dualtone | |
