= Neyla Pekarek =

American multi-instrumentalist and composer

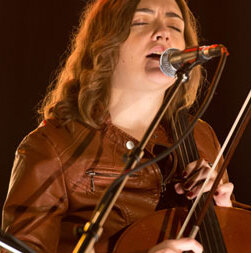
- Pekarek performing in 2012

Background information
- Born: September 4, 1986 (age 40)
- Origin: Denver, Colorado, United States
- Instruments: Vocals; cello; piano; mandolin
- Years active: 2010–Present
- Formerly of: The Lumineers
- Website: neylapekarek.com

Neyla Pekarek (/ˈniːlə pɛˈkærɛk/; born September 4, 1986) is an American cellist, vocalist, and pianist. She was a member of the folk rock band The Lumineers from 2010 to 2018.

== Early life ==
Pekarek was born and raised in Denver, Colorado. She grew up in a household with her parents and one sibling, an older sister. She began playing the cello at age nine, performing in her school's orchestra. She chose the cello because the school's policy was that only fifth-graders could play woodwind instruments, while fourth-graders could play stringed instruments. Explaining her thinking, she said, "...I went with cello because I wanted to get started sooner." Growing up, she enjoyed listening to powerful vocalists such as Etta James, Ella Fitzgerald, Aretha Franklin, and Otis Redding. Her parents introduced her to American folk music via vinyl records of Bob Dylan, Carole King, and Emmylou Harris. She attended college at the University of Northern Colorado, where she initially majored in vocal performance and musical theatre. She changed majors, however, graduating with a degree in music education and planning to become a choir teacher. Although she did not play the cello much while attending college, she earned some income post-graduation as a cellist at weddings.

== Career ==
=== The Lumineers (2010–2018) ===
After finishing her degree in music education, Pekarek responded to a Craigslist ad posted by Wesley Schultz and Jeremiah Fraites. Schultz and Fraites were looking for a cellist to join their band, The Lumineers. Explaining why she responded to the ad, Pekarek said, "I was living with my parents and kind of just looking for something to do. I thought it would be a fun way to pass my time until I found something full time to do."

For several months, the three rehearsed and played shows around Denver. They decided to undertake a small-scale concert tour for 30 days, playing shows from Portland, Oregon to New York City. Of her decision to tour with the band, Pekarek said, "I was only 23 years old. If you are going to be in a band and do something stupid, it might as well be then." The 30-day tour was followed by a tour of the West Coast and a weekly installment at The Living Room, a venue in New York.

While her contribution to the band was most noticeable as a cellist, she had a larger role as a vocalist in live performances, including performing a duet with Schultz. She took a passive approach to songwriting, with no credits on their first album and two credits on their second album ("Gale Song" and "My Eyes"). Pekarek said that she was content with her limited role in songwriting, stating of Fraites and Schultz, "They're very meticulous and being a part of that writing team is not for the faint of heart...I'm quite content to stay out of it."

Pekarek stated that she struggled with inequality in the music industry as the sole female member of The Lumineers, saying that women "have to talk twice as loud and perform twice as hard, and you have to wear heels! I see myself working really hard to make everything equal between all of us. The boys are learning a lot about it and they've been really supportive, but there've been some growing pains." She also stated, "...if I were to join a new band, I would definitely not be the only girl in it. It would be a much easier life to have another female around."

On October 18, 2018, it was announced that Pekarek would be leaving the band to pursue a solo career. On leaving the band, Pekarek later said:

"I was really ready to start writing my own songs and to start singing — both things I wasn’t doing in that band but also, some people I think are just really good at being leaders and some people are really good at following directions, and I think I was ready to be my own boss."

=== Solo (2019–present) ===
To promote the 2019 release of her debut solo album, Rattlesnake, Pekarek announced her initial headlining solo tour since her departure from The Lumineers.

Pekarek wrote the "folk opera" Rattlesnake about Katherine McHale Slaughterback, popularly called "Rattlesnake Kate," who was a renowned snake hunter of Colorado. She created a studio album of the songs from Rattlesnake. Rattlesnake was released on January 18, 2019, via S-Curve Records.

In February 2022, the musical play adaptation of Rattlesnake, Rattlesnake Kate premiered in Denver. In July, it was honored with eight Henry Awards. The Henrys are named for producer Henry Lowenstein and recognize achievements by the Colorado Theatre Guild's member companies. At the 16th annual awards show, the Denver Center for the Performing Arts received 47 nominations, including 16 for Rattlesnake Kate. Rattlesnake Kate won the awards for Outstanding Musical (tie), Direction of a Musical, Actor in a Musical (Tier 1), Actress in a Musical (Tier 1), Supporting Actor in a Musical (Tier 1), Supporting Actress in a Musical (Tier 1) (Pekarek), Choreography, and Outstanding New Play or Musical.

In May 2022, Pekarek was the speaker at the University of Northern Colorado's commencement ceremonies. Pekarek enjoys seeing plays, conducting musical training workshops with Colorado schoolchildren, and singing barbershop music competitively as a member of Sweet Adelines International. In November 2024 she became a Sweet Adelines 'Queen of Harmony' as tenor of the 2025 International Quartet Champions, Clever Girl.
