= Cleopatra (album) =

Studio album by the Lumineers
- Released: April 8, 2016
- Recorded: 2013–15
- Genres: Americana; folk rock; indie folk
- Length: 33:47
- Labels: Dualtone; Decca
- Producer: Simone Felice

The Lumineers chronology
Winter (2012)	Cleopatra (2016)	C-Sides (2018)

Singles from Cleopatra
- 1. "Ophelia" Released: February 5, 2016; 2. "Cleopatra" Released: March 25, 2016; 3. "Angela" Released: April 1, 2016; 4. "Sleep on the Floor" Released: November 16, 2016

Cleopatra is the second studio album by American indie folk band the Lumineers. The album was released in the United States on April 8, 2016, and contains the singles "Ophelia", "Cleopatra", "Angela" and "Sleep on the Floor". The album received positive reviews and commercial success, debuting at number one on the UK Albums Chart and the Billboard 200. It is the last album by the band to feature Neyla Pekarek, who left in October 2018 to pursue a solo career.

The cover is a photograph of actress Theda Bara.

== Critical reception ==
Professional ratings
Aggregate scores
Source	Rating
Metacritic	67/100
Review scores
Source	Rating
AllMusic	3/5 stars
Consequence of Sound	C+

Cleopatra received generally positive reviews from music critics. At Metacritic, which assigns a normalized rating out of 100 to reviews from mainstream critics, the album received an average score of 67, based on 11 reviews, which indicates "generally favorable reviews". PopMatters gave the album 60 points, saying: "If the Lumineers debut record was a representation of their metaphorical college years, Cleopatra is definitely their more mature, but confused, post-grad understanding of fame".

== The Ballad of Cleopatra compilation music video ==
The Ballad of Cleopatra is a compilation of the story in the music videos for Ophelia, Cleopatra, Sleep on the Floor, Angela and My Eyes, all songs from the album Cleopatra. The video was released on the Lumineers YouTube channel on April 27, 2017. As of March 5th, 2025 it has over 60 million views.

== Track listing ==
All tracks are written by Jeremiah Fraites and Wesley Schultz, except where noted.

No.	Title	Writer(s)	Length
1.	"Sleep on the Floor"		3:31
2.	"Ophelia"		2:40
3.	"Cleopatra"	Fraites; Schultz; Simone Felice	3:21
4.	"Gun Song"		3:36
5.	"Angela"	Fraites; Schultz; Felice	3:21
6.	"In the Light"		3:51
7.	"Gale Song"	Fraites; Schultz; Neyla Pekarek	3:13
8.	"Long Way from Home"		2:32
9.	"Sick in the Head"		2:31
10.	"My Eyes"	Fraites; Schultz; Pekarek	3:36
11.	"Patience"		1:35

Deluxe version bonus tracks
No.	Title	Writer(s)	Length
12.	"Where the Skies Are Blue"	Abraham Hovey	2:20
13.	"Everyone Requires a Plan"		2:40
14.	"White Lie"		3:15
15.	"Cleopatra" (acoustic demo)		4:48

Target bonus tracks
No.	Title	Writer(s)	Length
12.	"Sailor Song (Moitessier)"		2:24
13.	"For Fra"		1:42
14.	"Boots of Spanish Leather"	Bob Dylan	4:43

== Personnel ==
Credits for Cleopatra are adapted from official liner notes.

The Lumineers

- Wesley Schultz – lead vocals (all tracks except 11), guitar (all tracks except 11), percussion (track 2, 3)
- Jeremiah Fraites – drums (all tracks except 8, 9, 11, 13), percussion (all tracks except 8, 9, 11, 12, 13, 14), piano (all tracks except 8, 9, 12, 13, 14), keyboards (track 9, 14)
- Neyla Pekarek – cello (track 1, 3, 4, 5, 7, 10, 12, 13, 14), vocals (track 1, 2, 3, 4, 5, 7, 12, 14)

Additional Musicians

- Byron Isaacs – bass guitar (all tracks except 7, 8, 9, 11, 13, 14), background vocals (track 1, 2, 4, 5, 10)
- Simon Felice – percussion (all tracks except 6, 8, 9, 11, 12), background vocals (track 2, 4)
- David Baron – keyboards (track 1, 7, 8, 9, 11)
- Lauren Jacobson – strings (track 1, 4, 5, 7, 9, 10), violin (track 8), background vocals (track 2, 4)
- Rick Mullen – guitar technician
- Abraham Hovey – guitar (track 12)

Artwork

- The Kobal Collection – photography
- Daniel Quay – layout

Technical

- Simone Felice – production (all tracks except 13, 14)
- Jesse O'Brien – production (track 13, 14), recording (track 13, 14)
- Bob Ludwig – mastering
- Ryan Hewitt – mixing, recording (all tracks except 13, 14)
- Chad Cuttill – mixing assistance (all tracks except 13, 14)

Recording

- Recorded at Clubhouse Recording Studios
- Mixed at House of Blues Studios, Nashville, TN
- Mastered at Gateway Mastering

== Charts ==
=== Weekly charts ===
Weekly chart performance
Chart (2016)	Peak position
Australian Albums (ARIA)	2
Austrian Albums (Ö3 Austria)	13
Belgian Albums (Ultratop Flanders)	23
Belgian Albums (Ultratop Wallonia)	35
Canadian Albums (Billboard)	1
Dutch Albums (Album Top 100)	22
French Albums (SNEP)	44
German Albums (Offizielle Top 100)	16
Irish Albums (IRMA)	4
Italian Albums (FIMI)	27
New Zealand Albums (RMNZ)	10
Norwegian Albums (VG-lista)	27
Scottish Albums (Official Charts)	2
Spanish Albums (Promusicae)	51
Swedish Albums (Sverigetopplistan)	42
Swiss Albums (Schweizer Hitparade)	5
UK Albums (Official Charts)	1
UK Americana Albums (Official Charts)	1
US Billboard 200	1
US Americana/Folk Albums (Billboard)	1
US Independent Albums (Billboard)	1
US Top Alternative Albums (Billboard)	1
US Top Rock Albums (Billboard)	1

=== Year-end charts ===
Year-end chart performance
Chart (2016)	Position
Canadian Albums (Billboard)	20
US Billboard 200	52
US Top Rock Albums (Billboard)	9
Chart (2017)	Position
Canadian Albums (Billboard)	44
US Billboard 200	77
US Top Rock Albums (Billboard)	8
Chart (2018)	Position
US Top Rock Albums (Billboard)	30
Chart (2019)	Position
US Top Rock Albums (Billboard)	76
Chart (2020)	Position
US Top Rock Albums (Billboard)	53
Chart (2021)	Position
US Top Rock Albums (Billboard)	65

== Certifications ==
Certifications
Region	Certification	Certified units/sales
Canada (Music Canada)	3× Platinum	240,000^{‡}
Denmark (IFPI Danmark)	Gold	10,000^{‡}
France (SNEP)	Gold	50,000^{‡}
Italy (FIMI)	Gold	25,000^{‡}
New Zealand (RMNZ)	Platinum	15,000^{‡}
Poland (ZPAV)	Gold	10,000^{‡}
United Kingdom (BPI)	Gold	100,000^{‡}
United States (RIAA)	2× Platinum	2,000,000^{‡}
^{‡} Sales+streaming figures based on certification alone.
