= The Lumineers =

American indie folk band

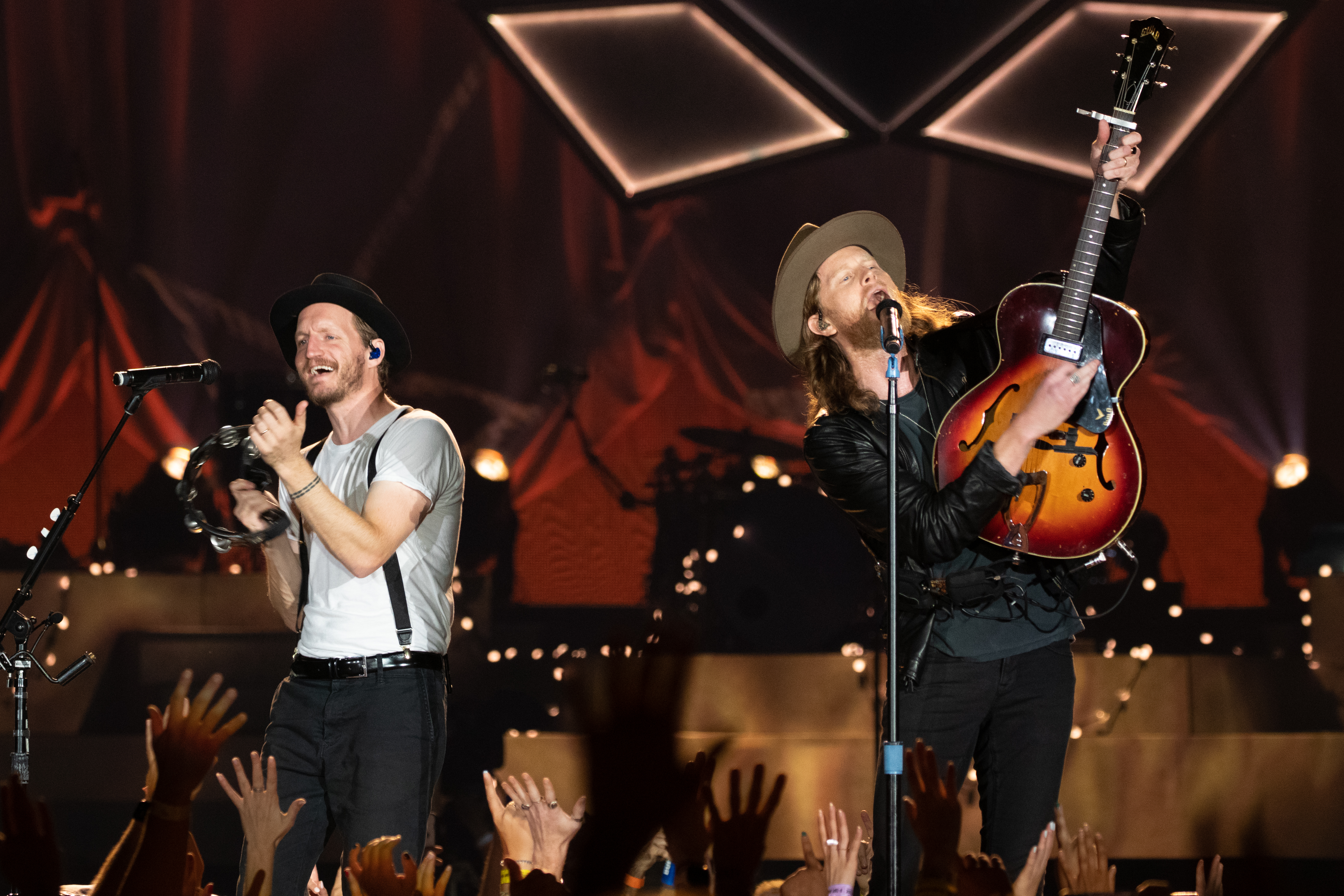
- The Lumineers performing live at Wrigley Field, Chicago in 2022. From left to right: Jeremiah Fraites & Wesley Schultz.

Background information
- Origin: Ramsey, New Jersey, U.S.
- Genres: Indie folk; folk rock; Americana
- Years active: 2005–present
- Labels: Dualtone; Decca; Dine Alone
- Members: Wesley Schultz; Jeremiah Fraites
- Past members: Neyla Pekarek; Maxwell Hughes; Ben Wahamaki; Jay Van Dyke
- Website: thelumineers.com

The Lumineers are an American indie folk band formed in Ramsey, New Jersey, in 2005, and now based in Denver, Colorado. The founding members are Wesley Schultz (lead vocals, guitar) and Jeremiah Fraites (drums, percussion, piano); cellist and vocalist Neyla Pekarek joined the band in 2010, and was a member until 2018. The Lumineers emerged as one of the most popular folk-rock/Americana artists during the revival of these genres, their popularity growing in the 2010s. They are known for their energetic live shows and several international hit singles, including "Ho Hey", "Stubborn Love", "Ophelia", "Angela" and "Cleopatra". The band has become one of the top touring bands in the United States and is also popular in other countries.

The Lumineers have released five albums on American independent label Dualtone Records (Dine Alone in Canada and Decca/Universal worldwide). Their self-titled first album was released in 2012 and peaked at No. 2 on the U.S. Billboard 200. It has been certified triple platinum in the U.S. and Canada, platinum in the UK and Ireland, and gold in Australia. Their second album, Cleopatra, was released in 2016 and debuted at No. 1 on the Billboard 200, and also on the Canadian and British album charts. It is currently certified platinum in the U.S. Their third album, titled III, was released on September 13, 2019 and debuted at No. 2 on the Billboard 200. Their fourth album, Brightside, was released on January 14, 2022. Their fifth and most recent album, Automatic, was released on February 14, 2025.

== History ==
=== 2002–2009: Early years ===
When Schultz and Fraites began collaborating, writing together and playing gigs around New York City, they did so under various names, including Free Beer, 6Cheek and Wesley Jeremiah. Fraites elaborated, "When Wes and I got together, our first band name was Free Beer. It wasn't serious at first. We were a crappy band doing (terrible) covers. But we slowly started getting away from covers and writing originals. We were doing everything: vanilla singer-songwriter stuff, hard rock, electronic music. There was no focus; it was a mad, random mess." According to Schultz, the band became 'The Lumineers' after a band called Lumineers (a made up word) were supposed to play at a club in Jersey City the week after Schultz and Fraites played there. The emcee mistakenly introduced Schultz and Fraites as The Lumineers, and the name stuck.

The Lumineers struggled to find success in New York according to Schultz, who said, "I was living in Brooklyn and working three jobs just to pay the rent," adding, "it was really infuriating to move to a city that would help us grow musically but then never have any time to work on music. So I decided to do something about it." In 2009, after considering relocating to London, Philadelphia and Boston, Fraites and Schultz, in their "ignorance and naïveté", moved to Denver, Colorado, and joined the open mic scene. Before the move, while the band was still called Wesley Jeremiah, they had a former member, Jason "Jay" Van Dyke play with them rarely. Van Dyke sued The Lumineers around 2008, claiming that Schultz and Fraites didn't give him the proper credit he deserved. Later Schultz and Fraites acknowledged Van Dyke, and admitted that they performed for a short period of time. Van Dyke claims that he co-wrote nine songs with Schultz and Fraites. The parties settled the lawsuit in 2017, with the terms of the settlement confidential.

In 2009, Jeremiah and Wesley recorded a song called Don't Wanna Go, but it was never officially released and as of now is only available on SoundCloud and YouTube. The song describes the grief of the band after someone very close to them had unexpectedly died, likely due to a medical emergency of some sort. This follows the band's moral theme of grief, considering the depressing fact that they started the band in their shared time of lament after Jeremiah's brother and Wesley's father died.

=== 2010–2013: The Lumineers ===
In 2010, after the band's relocation to Denver, Fraites and Schultz met classically trained cellist Neyla Pekarek. Although Pekarek had just recently graduated from college and was planning to become a music teacher, she responded to a Craigslist ad posted by Schultz and Fraites requesting a cellist and agreed to join the band when she was invited.

As a three-piece, The Lumineers met Maxwell Hughes at an open mic event in Denver. Hughes played and toured with the band as an unofficial fourth member and contributed to the band's debut album. He suggested joining the band as a mandolin accompaniment, but the band was not looking for a permanent fourth member at the time, so Hughes and The Lumineers parted ways.

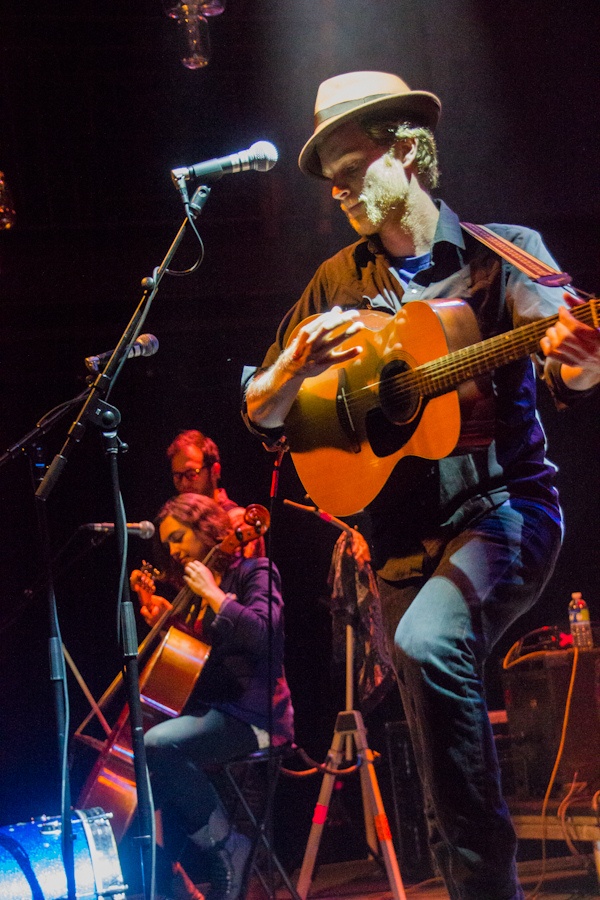
At 9:30 Club in Washington, D.C., on August 2, 2012; touring with Old Crow Medicine Show. Wesley Schultz on acoustic guitar (right), Neyla Pekarek on cello (left).

They originally signed a management deal with Onto Entertainment which funded the band to record a full-length album in Seattle at Bear Creek Studio with producer Ryan Hadlock. The album was then remixed by Kevin Augunas, who also worked with the Black Keys, Cold War Kids, Edward Sharpe and the Magnetic Zeros, J-Roddy Walston and the Business, and Jon Brion.

In December 2011, the song "Ho Hey", which would become the band's first single, was used in the first season of CW's Hart of Dixie. This started a national buzz on social media. In January 2012, John Richards, the morning show DJ at KEXP-FM in Seattle, discovered "Ho Hey" in a pile of new CDs he had received, played it twice in a row daily for a week, and called it the best song of 2012. WXPN Philadelphia / NPR then conducted a feature on the band on their "World Cafe: Next" program. The band passed up major label offers to sign a deal with an independent label Dualtone Records that same month. The album was then licensed under similar terms to Dine Alone Records in Canada, Inertia in Australia, and Decca Records for the rest of the world. On signing with smaller independent labels, Fraites claimed, "it's just nice to work with people that are entirely engaged. You know, not just sitting in front of a computer and playing Angry Birds on their cell phones all day," adding, "with these smaller labels, people work 12 or 15 hour days to ensure our records are in the stores, and that we're getting played at radio. We want to work with people that are as hungry as we are."

Their self-titled debut album The Lumineers was released on April 3, 2012, on Dualtone Records. The album was met with mixed to positive critical reception, holding a 73 on review aggregator Metacritic, translating to "generally favorable reviews". Musicperk.com rated the album 8/10 commenting, "a spark of uniqueness does exist". The band's popularity continued to build in 2012 with sold-out shows and favorable reviews, and their debut album went on to peak at number two on the Billboard 200 album chart. Of the album's success, Schultz told Liz Riggs of American Songwriter that "It's really arbitrary to any of us, especially to Jer and Neyla and I... because we've never really had an album out in this way... I'm really thrilled, but I also take it with a grain of salt," adding, "I think basically, I feel really lucky because I know how fickle the business, the industry is."

On June 14, 2012, the album's first single, "Ho Hey", debuted at number 90 on the Billboard Hot 100 chart, their first song to do so. "Ho Hey" later peaked at number three on the Hot 100, making it the band's first top five single. As of 2017, the track has sold over five million copies. On June 30, "Ho Hey" hit number one at commercial Triple A radio, maintaining the position for eight weeks. Later, on September 17, the song hit number one on the Alternative Songs chart where it stayed for two weeks. "Ho Hey" also reached number one on Billboard's Rock Airplay, Hot Rock Songs, Alternative Songs, Rock Digital Songs, Alternative Digital Songs, Heatseekers Songs, Adult Pop Songs and Adult Contemporary Songs charts. "Ho Hey" experienced charting success internationally as well, reaching number one on the Canadian Alternative radio chart and number 17 on the Canadian single sales chart. It also reached number eight on the UK Singles Chart, becoming their first top 10 single there. In October 2012, Spotify named "Ho Hey" as the most shared song in Manhattan and third most shared in Brooklyn.

As of February 2025 the song had been streamed more than 1.4 billion times on Spotify and 356 million on YouTube.

On November 23, 2012, The Lumineers released Winter, an EP version of their self-titled debut album. On December 5, 2012, The Lumineers were nominated for two Grammy Awards for Best New Artist and Best Americana Album.

Continuing into 2013, "Ho Hey" would spend eight consecutive weeks atop Billboard's Adult Pop Songs chart. Simultaneously, "Stubborn Love", the second single off their self-titled album, would see two four-week runs at number one on the Adult Alternative Songs chart.

The Lumineers headline shows in the Northeastern U.S. were announced for February 2013 and quickly sold out. Similarly, the band's tours of the UK, Europe and Australia in early 2013 sold out all shows, after many shows were moved to larger venues.

"Submarines" was released as the third single on July 30, 2013. The band performed "Ho Hey" and "Submarines" on The Colbert Report in July 2013. In August 2013, "Ho Hey" would become the 10th song to reach a 60th week on the Billboard Hot 100 chart, eventually finishing its run on the Hot 100 after 62 weeks, one of the highest runs in the chart's history. Subsequently, on August 20, 2013, a deluxe edition of their debut album was released, which included five bonus tracks, over 25 minutes of video footage and a 28-page booklet. Several songs by the band were used in the television series Reign. "Scotland", in particular, was used as the theme song for the series, and was co-written by and features a performance from Jason "Jay" Van Dyke, who sometimes played with Schultz and Fraites before their move to Denver.

=== 2014–2018: Cleopatra ===
Fraites and Schultz composed the music for "The Hanging Tree". "The Hanging Tree" is a song produced and performed by James Newton Howard featuring vocals from American actress Jennifer Lawrence for the 2014 film The Hunger Games: Mockingjay – Part 1, the third installment of The Hunger Games film series. The song appears on both the official score album for the film and on the digital re-release of the official soundtrack for the film. The lyrics were written by The Hunger Games author Suzanne Collins and originally appeared in her novel Mockingjay. Following its release, "The Hanging Tree" debuted in the top 40 of the singles charts of Australia, the United Kingdom and the United States. The song was released to American mainstream radio stations on December 9, 2014.

In September 2014, it was announced that The Lumineers began working on their second album. Schultz stated through Instagram, "Well folks, we are back in the studio, chippin' away at some new ideas. It's been one hell of a ride so far and we are excited to be writing again. Thanks and stay tuned." While performing the unreleased material in secret concerts, the Lumineers banned mobile phones, providing a locking pouch for people to hold their phones in during live performances.

The band released their second studio album Cleopatra on April 8, 2016. The black and white photo on the cover depicts silent movie star Theda Bara in the title role in the 1917 film Cleopatra. Cleopatra was co-produced by Simone Felice at The Clubhouse Studio in Rhinebeck, New York, and mixed (blending of all individual tracks in a recording) at The House Of Blues Studios in Nashville, Tennessee, by Ryan Hewitt. Band member changes for the Cleopatra tour included bass player Ben Wahamaki, a touring member since 2012, being replaced by Byron Isaacs.

The album's first single "Ophelia" was released February 5, 2016, and quickly rose to No. 1 on the Triple A chart where it stayed for 13 weeks, the second-longest time any song has been No. 1 at Triple A radio, tied with Gotye's "Somebody That I Used to Know", just behind Coldplay's record of 14 weeks for their song "Clocks". At Alternative radio "Ophelia" also quickly rose to No. 1 where it stayed for four weeks and became the most-played song at Alternative radio to be released in 2016. Ophelia ended 2016 as Billboard's #1 Alternative song and #1 Rock Radio song. As of October 2024 "Ophelia" had exceeded 1.3 billion Spotify streams and 245 million streams on YouTube.

The second single, also the album's title track, "Cleopatra", sprang from an encounter with a taxi driver Wes met in the Republic of Georgia, who told a story of personal tragedy without a trace of self-pity. "Cleopatra" jumped quickly to No. 2 at Triple A radio where it peaked, and then became the band's third single to reach No. 1 at Alternative radio where it stayed for two weeks.

The album itself was No. 1 on the Billboard Top 200 in April 2016.

A third single, "Angela", quickly rose to No. 2 on Triple A radio and broke into the top five at Alternative radio the week of December 11, 2017, making "Cleopatra" the first independent album to have three top five singles at Alternative radio since Mediabase reporting started. In an interview with Rolling Stone, frontman Wesley Schultz said he wrote most of "Angela" about his ex-girlfriend, Angela Henard. "Although we didn't work out she still holds a place in my heart. This is why she is brought up in multiple songs."

In April 2017, the band released the short film The Ballad of Cleopatra, which brings together videos for the songs "Cleopatra", "Angela", "Ophelia", "Sleep on the Floor" and "My Eyes". Directed by Isaac Ravishankara (Ellie Goulding, Hozier, Phantogram), the film depicts Cleopatra's life story in one continuous narrative.

The band accompanied their album release with the announcement of the Cleopatra World Tour. This tour, spreading over 2016 and 2017, sold over 750,000 tickets in the United States alone and included two sold-out performances at Madison Square Garden in New York City, three sold-out performances at Marymoor Amphitheater in Seattle, WA, two sold-out performances at Red Rocks Amphitheatre in Denver, CO, as well as Los Angeles's Hollywood Bowl, and Merriweather Post Pavilion in Columbia, MD. In addition to their touring success in the United States, the band toured worldwide and sold over 100,000 tickets between Canada, The United Kingdom, Germany, France, Switzerland, Spain, Italy, Poland, Czech Republic, Australia, and South Africa.

On January 9, 2017, Irish rock band U2 announced that The Lumineers would be among their guests during the North American leg of the "Joshua Tree Tour 2017", opening shows at the Rose Bowl in Pasadena, NRG Stadium in Houston, AT & T Stadium in Dallas, Soldier Field in Chicago, Heinz Field in Pittsburgh, Lincoln Financial Field in Philadelphia, FedEx Field in Washington DC, Rogers Centre in Toronto, Gillette Stadium in Foxborough, Massachusetts, and MetLife Stadium in East Rutherford.

In addition to their support tour with U2, the Lumineers announced two performances with Tom Petty and the Heartbreakers in Seattle and Vancouver. They also announced a mid-August performance in London with Tom Petty and Stevie Nicks.

To finish off their Cleopatra World Tour, the band announced three August 2017 "homecoming" performances at Denver's Fiddler's Green Amphitheater.

In October 2018, Neyla Pekarek quit the band in order to concentrate on a solo career.

=== 2019–2021: III ===
On April 1, 2019, they posted a number of photos, including one of the hashtag #whoarethesparks. On April 2, they teased their third album, titled III, and announced that a new single, "Gloria", would be released on April 5. The album was released on September 13. The group is featured on the For The Throne album with the song "Nightshade", which was released on April 26, 2019, accompanying the final season of Game of Thrones.

On June 15, they performed "Leader of the Landslide" at Piqniq, which was set to be a track on their yet-to-be-released album.

On June 28, they played tracks from the album on The Other Stage at Glastonbury Festival along with tracks from their previous two albums.

On July 19, they released their second single from the album, "It Wasn't Easy to Be Happy for You", from Chapter II: Junior Sparks.

On December 12, the Lumineers played along with Arkells at the 108th Grey Cup halftime show in Hamilton, Ontario.

For the year 2020, while touring was limited by the COVID-19 pandemic, the Lumineers were No. 27 on Billboard's 40 Top Paid Musicians worldwide list and No. 6 in box office revenue, having played 20 shows to 215,000 fans.

=== 2021–2024: Brightside ===
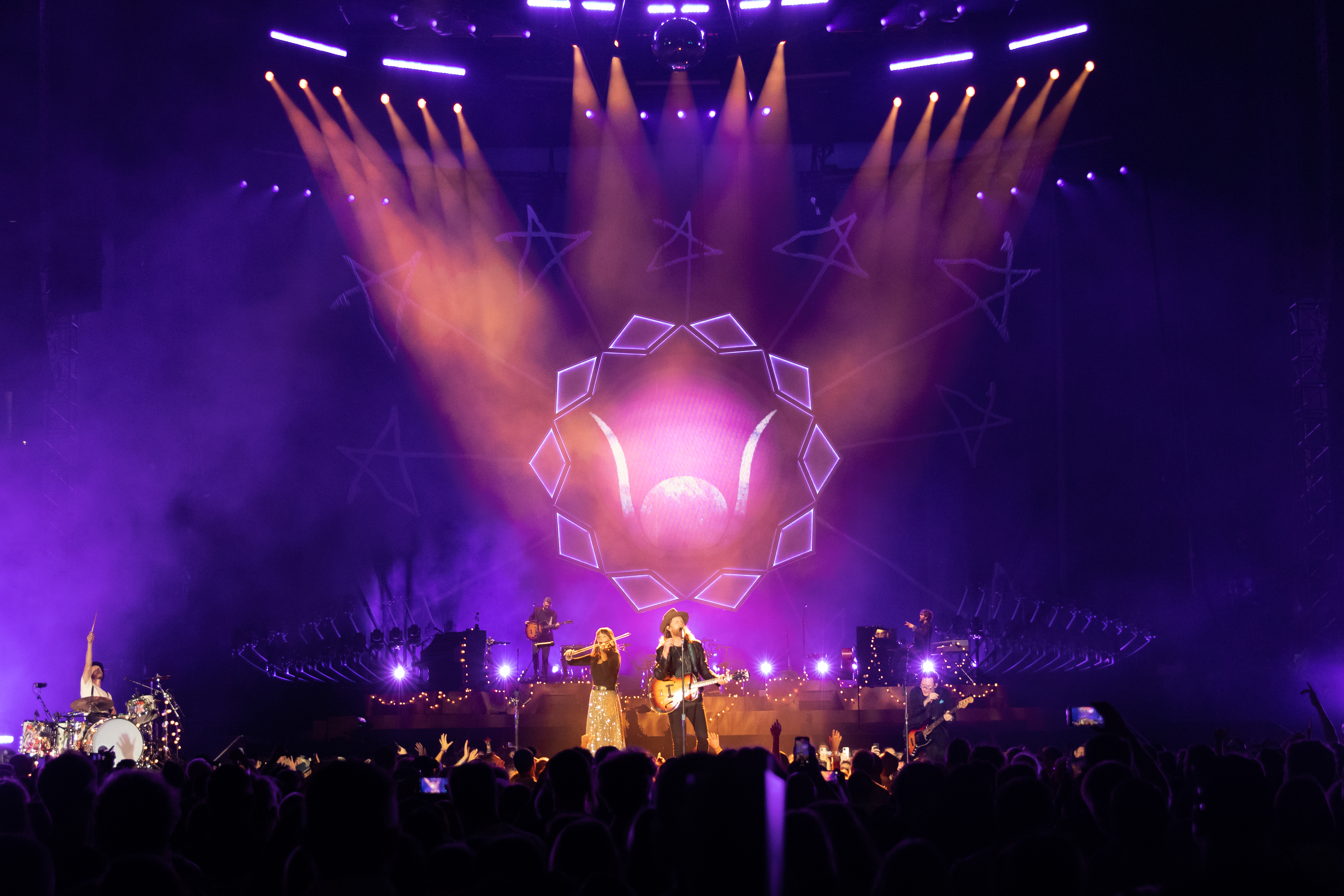
The Lumineers performing the Brightside World Tour in Chicago

On September 20, 2021, they announced their fourth studio album, Brightside, and released the title track as the lead single on the same day. A music video was also released for the song on the same day. On October 13, 2021, "Big Shot" was released as the second single, along with an accompanying music video. On November 17, 2021, "A.M. Radio" was released as the third single. The accompanying music video was shot at Ramsey High School, the alma mater of Schultz and Fraites, employing current and former students as extras and production assistants. On January 14, 2022, Brightside was officially released. The band announced on February 8, 2022, that there would be a tour for their North America Brightside World Tour 2022. In April, they did a cover of "Just Like Heaven" which was originally written by The Cure, and is considered one of their bonus tracks for "Brightside."

The group collaborated with American country star Zach Bryan on the single "Spotless" which appeared on Bryan's self-titled fourth studio album. The song peaked at number 17 on the Billboard Hot 100.

In 2024, The group announced the release of Live from Wrigley Field which was recorded at the final stop of the Brightside World Tour in 2022 in Chicago. The live recording was released September 27, 2024. Prior to the full release, two singles from the upcoming album, Gale Song (feat. James Bay) (Live from Wrigley Field) and Sleep On The Floor (Live from Wrigley Field) were released on August 14, 2024 and September 4, 2024 respectively.

=== 2025-present: Automatic ===
On January 8, 2025, the Lumineers announced that their fifth studio album, Automatic, would be released on February 14, 2025. The lead single, "Same Old Song", was released the same day as the album announcement. On February 12, the band announced a tour in support of the album, set to begin on July 3, 2025, which ran through mid-October. The band released an EP for the then-upcoming album that included three songs: "Same Old Song", "Asshole", and "So Long".

On April 23, 2025, the Lumineers released a single called "Sugar Mountain".

On July 7, 2025, the Lumineers quietly released a cover of the song "Shout" by Tears for Fears as the theme song for the second season of the television series The Institute.

== Musical style ==
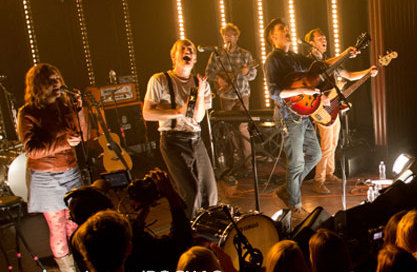
The Lumineers performing at the Rock4G concert in 2012.

Schultz has stated, "I write the lyrics, and I co-write the songs with Jer," adding "It's never the same thing with each song. Generally speaking it involves a piano, a guitar, and maybe singing, and we usually start out with the chord structure, a set of chords, a melody especially, and then the lyrics usually follow. Or it's one phrase that you really find great and then you build the song around that." Schultz later claimed, "Your melodies make people want to hear what you're saying," adding, "They've got to be open to hearing it, almost hum it. And if they want to go deeper there is something there."

Fraites emphasizes the simplicity of the group's style, stating, "we're not reinventing the wheel or doing anything that different, the songs are super simple. The ideas themselves are very simple ideas. Anyone who can play an instrument can play a Lumineers song. I think there's a certain cinematic aspect of our music that I really like." Launchpad similarly writes, "where most bands these days look for that new, original sound to enhance the digital revolution, 'The Lumineers' do superbly in taking it back to simplicity." In another interview, Fraites explains, "I just think people are enamored of going into a room and watching people play their own instruments and sing, rather than using Auto-Tune and a lot of digital equipment to get their sound across. There is so much digital-ness all around us. People are almost taken aback when you do the opposite of that. It's inspiring."

Alister Roberts of Contactmusic has described the band's self-titled debut album as, "a perfectly formed collection of rustic folk type songs, slotting in nicely amongst the current roots revival." Their folk sound has received comparisons to Mumford & Sons. On Mumford & Sons, Schultz has commented that they, "kicked down doors, and they allowed radio to receive a band like us because we somehow slightly resemble what they're doing." Jon Pareles of The New York Times wrote that, "Mumford comparisons rankle the Lumineers. While both bands wrap moody lyrics in toe-tapping melodies, Mumford & Sons pile on instruments in massive buildups. The Lumineers, by contrast, stay sparse, barely getting around to using an electric guitar on The Lumineers."

Other artists have commented on the folk-style music of The Lumineers and Mumford & Sons; alternative rock artist Jack White praised the style, stating, "I think these acts nowadays are keeping people's ears open to the idea of the soulfulness of folk-style music and acoustic music, and you get a little bit closer to the musician, to the writer, at times." Conversely, hard and shock rock artist Alice Cooper criticized the two bands, calling it "an offense" to label them rock bands. By 2025, online criticism towards the Lumineers and their contemporaries frequently referred to their folk-style derisively as "stomp clap hey" music.

== Influences ==
The band cites a diverse range of influences, including Bob Dylan, Ludwig van Beethoven, Guns N' Roses, Talking Heads, Bruce Springsteen, Pearl Jam, The Cars, Leonard Cohen, and "cinematic music and anything strange and weird." Schultz adds Bob Dylan, Born in the U.S.A., Greatest Hits, Sand in the Vaseline, Exile on Main St., and The Future as specific album influences. Additionally, Schultz cites a Tom Petty performance as one that "really stands out" to him, stating "I just remember him playing "Last Dance with Mary Jane", and as the opening guitar line was being played, he opened up a chest on stage that had not been opened the entire show, pulled out a hat, put that hat on for the duration of the song, and then opened the chest back up and put it in and shut it. That is the moment I took away from his show. This taught me everything I needed to know."

== Band members ==
Current members

- Wesley Schultz – lead vocals, guitar, keyboards (2005–present)
- Jeremiah Fraites – drums, percussion, keyboards, guitar, mandolin, sampler, backing vocals (2005–present)

Current touring musicians

- Stelth Ulvang – piano, keyboards, accordion, mandolin, guitar, percussion, backing vocals (2011–present)
- Byron Isaacs – bass, guitar, backing vocals (2016–present)
- Brandon Miller – guitar, mandolin, percussion (2016–present)
- Lauren Jacobson – strings, piano, backing vocals (2018–present)

Former members

- Jay Van Dyke – drums (2008–2009)
- Maxwell Hughes – guitar (2010–2011)
- Neyla Pekarek – cello, backing vocals, keyboards, mandolin (2010–2018)
- Ben Wahamaki – bass (2012–2015)

== Discography ==
- The Lumineers (2012)
- Cleopatra (2016)
- III (2019)
- Brightside (2022)
- Automatic (2025)

== Tours ==
Headlining

- The Lumineers World Tour (2012–2013)
- Cleopatra World Tour (2016–2017)
- III: The World Tour (2019–2020)
- Brightside World Tour (2022)
- The Automatic World Tour (2025)

Opening act

- The Joshua Tree Tour 2017 (2017; supporting U2)

== Awards and nominations ==
Award	Year	Nominee(s)	Category	Result	Ref.
American Music Awards	2013	The Lumineers	Favorite Rock Artist	Nominated	
American Music Awards	2022	The Lumineers	Favorite Rock Artist	Nominated	
American Music Awards	2026	The Lumineers	Best Americana/Folk Artist	Pending	
Billboard Music Awards	2013	The Lumineers	Top New Artist	Nominated	
Billboard Music Awards	2013	"Ho Hey"	Top Rock Song	Nominated	
Billboard Music Awards	2013	The Lumineers	Top Rock Album	Nominated	
Billboard Music Awards	2017	Cleopatra	Top Rock Album	Nominated	
Billboard Music Awards	2020	III	Top Rock Album	Nominated	
mtvU Woodie Awards	2013	The Lumineers	Breaking Woodie	Nominated	
Teen Choice Awards	2013	The Lumineers	Choice Music: Rock Group	Nominated	
Teen Choice Awards	2013	The Lumineers	Choice Music: Breakout Group	Nominated	
Teen Choice Awards	2013	"Ho Hey"	Choice Music: Rock Song	Nominated	

Grammy Awards
Year	Nominee / work	Award	Result
2013	The Lumineers	Best New Artist	Nominated
2013	The Lumineers	Best Americana Album	Nominated
