= Jeremiah Fraites =

American musician (born 1986)

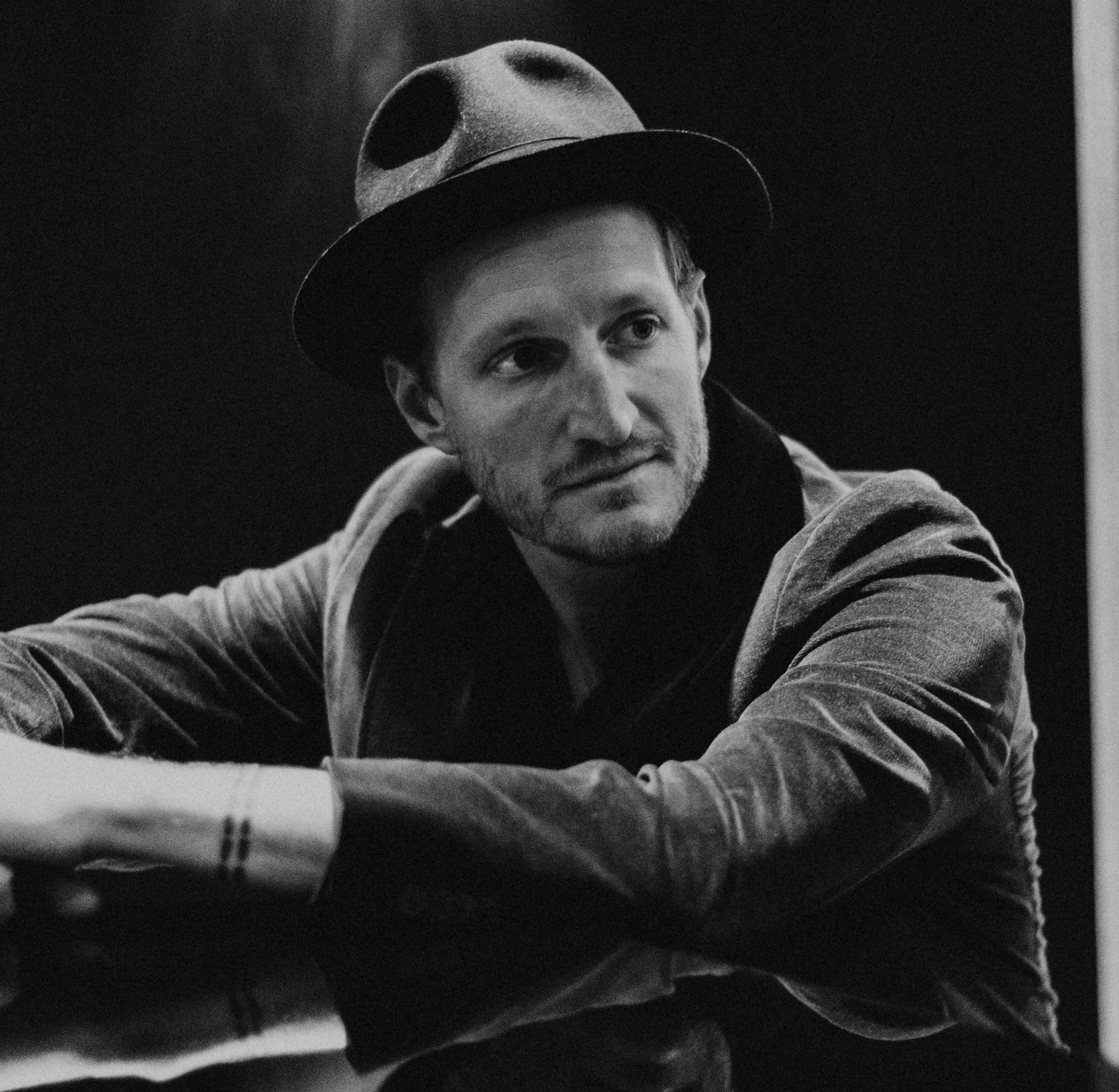
- Fraites in 2022

Background information
- Born: Jeremiah Caleb Fraites; January 17, 1986 (age 40); Ramsey, New Jersey, U.S.
- Genres: Indie folk, folk rock
- Occupations: Musician, composer, songwriter
- Instruments: Drums, percussion, keyboards, guitar, mandolin, bass, sampler
- Years active: 2005–present
- Labels: Dualtone, Mercury KX
- Member of: The Lumineers

Jeremiah Caleb Fraites (born January 17, 1986) is an American drummer, composer, songwriter, and multi-instrumentalist. He is a co-founder of The Lumineers and is a songwriter for the band. He was born and raised in Ramsey, New Jersey.

== Early and personal life ==
Jeremiah Fraites' family is from Ramsey, New Jersey; his mother is the director of the Redeemer Christian Nursery School in Ramsey. Fraites graduated from Ramsey High School in 2004, and William Paterson University in 2009.

Fraites got his first drum set at age 14, the summer before his freshman year of high school. He grew up surrounded by music in his community and immediate family. His brother played the guitar, his dad sang in the choir, and his mother sang to her nursery school students.

In 2001, his brother Joshua died of a heroin drug overdose at age 19 after being in and out of rehab. Jeremiah Fraites also struggled with addiction in the years after his brother's death but managed to recover and become sober.

He married Francesca Lazzarin in 2019, and they had two children together. Lazzarin is Italian, and the family split their time between the United States and Turin. Fraites and Lazzarin have worked professionally together on Fraites' solo piano and instrumental projects.

== The Lumineers ==
=== Beginnings ===
Fraites' brother Josh (1982–2001) was a friend of Wesley Schultz; after Josh's death, Jeremiah Fraites and Schultz began playing music together as a way to cope with their shared loss. After years of playing in the Fraites home, in 2005, they relocated to New York City and began to play in small clubs and at open mic nights in an attempt to find success in the music business. They played several types of music, and occasionally included other musicians while they played under various names, including Free Beer and Wesley Jeremiah.

=== Move to Denver ===
In 2009, Fraites graduated from college. Unhappy at having to work multiple jobs to make ends meet while attempting to become full-time musicians, Fraites and Schultz decided to relocate to Denver, which had a lower cost of living. They eventually placed a Craigslist ad for a cello player, which led to Neyla Pekarek joining the band.

=== Recording contract ===
A self-financed tour in 2009–2010 led to the band being signed to a management contract. Their management company financed an EP. As they became better known, their self-financed tour and their EP led to The Lumineers being signed to a recording contract. The band subsequently released the albums The Lumineers (2012) and Cleopatra (2016).

=== Solo work ===
Fraites released his solo debut album Piano Piano on January 22, 2021, through Dualtone Records (US/Canada) and Mercury KX (World). The album is a collection of piano-centric instrumental songs that he had been working on for over a decade. It was met with critical acclaim from NPR's Weekend Edition, Denver Post, NPR Music's All Songs Considered, American Songwriter, and Earmilk, among others.

Fraites partnered with the meditation app Calm for the release of two exclusive tracks titled "Felt" and "Pluck".

He also partnered with the British music technology company Spitfire Audio for their Originals series on a program called "Firewood Piano". The program is based on his eccentric upright piano, nicknamed "Firewood", which he used to record several songs for his solo debut album.

He composed the score for the film The Long Walk, which was released in theaters on September 12, 2025. It is his first film score. His second film score will be for Springsteen: Deliver Me from Nowhere.

== Songwriting credits ==
Year	Artist	Song	Album	Co-written with	U.S. peak position	U.K. peak position
2012	The Lumineers	"Big Parade"	The Lumineers	Wesley Schultz		
2012	The Lumineers	"Charlie Boy"	The Lumineers	Wesley Schultz, Maxwell Hughes		
2012	The Lumineers	"Classy Girls"	The Lumineers	Wesley Schultz		
2012	The Lumineers	"Dead Sea"	The Lumineers	Wesley Schultz		
2012	The Lumineers	"Flapper Girl"	The Lumineers	Wesley Schultz		
2012	The Lumineers	"Flowers In Your Hair"	The Lumineers	Wesley Schultz		
2012	The Lumineers	"Ho Hey"	The Lumineers	Wesley Schultz	3	8
2012	The Lumineers	"Morning Song"	The Lumineers	Wesley Schultz, Maxwell Hughes		
2012	The Lumineers	"Slow It Down"	The Lumineers	Wesley Schultz		
2012	The Lumineers	"Stubborn Love"	The Lumineers	Wesley Schultz	70	—
2012	The Lumineers	"Submarines"	The Lumineers	Wesley Schultz		
2016	The Lumineers	"Ophelia"	Cleopatra	Wesley Schultz		
2016	The Lumineers	"Cleopatra"	Cleopatra	Wesley Schultz, Simone Felice		
2016	The Lumineers	"Angela"	Cleopatra	Wesley Schultz, Simone Felice		
2016	The Lumineers	"Gale Song"	Cleopatra	Wesley Schultz, Neyla Pekarek		
2016	The Lumineers	"Gun Song"	Cleopatra	Wesley Schultz		
2016	The Lumineers	"In The Light"	Cleopatra	Wesley Schultz		
2016	The Lumineers	"Long Way From Home"	Cleopatra	Wesley Schultz		
2016	The Lumineers	"My Eyes"	Cleopatra	Wesley Schultz, Neyla Pekarek		
2016	The Lumineers	"Sleep on the Floor"	Cleopatra	Wesley Schultz		
2016	The Lumineers	"White Lie"	Cleopatra	Wesley Schultz		
2019	The Lumineers	"Donna"	III	Wesley Schultz		
2019	The Lumineers	"Life In The City"	III	Wesley Schultz		
2019	The Lumineers	"Gloria"	III	Wesley Schultz		
2019	The Lumineers	"It Wasn't Easy To Be Happy For You"	III	Wesley Schultz		
2019	The Lumineers	"Leader of the Landslide"	III	Wesley Schultz		
2019	The Lumineers	"Left for Denver"	III	Wesley Schultz		
2019	The Lumineers	"My Cell"	III	Wesley Schultz		
2019	The Lumineers	"Jimmy Sparks"	III	Wesley Schultz		
2019	The Lumineers	"April"	III	Wesley Schultz		
2019	The Lumineers	"Salt and the Sea"	III	Wesley Schultz		
2019	The Lumineers	"Old Lady"	III	Wesley Schultz		
2019	The Lumineers	"Soundtrack Song"	III	Wesley Schultz		

== Sources ==
=== Newspapers ===
- Carrera, Catherine (February 14, 2013). "Ramsey's 'Lumineer' Mom Shares Proud Moment". Ramsey Suburban News. Ramsey, NJ.

=== Magazines ===
- Krueger, Kathleen. "Neyla Pekarek: The Path of the Girl in the Band". HERLIFE Magazine. Highlands Ranch, CO.
- Laudadio, Marisa (January 19, 2013). "Five Things to Know About The Lumineers". People. New York, NY.
- Trust, Gary (April 20, 2016). "The Lumineers Light Up Billboard Artist 100 at No. 1". Billboard. Hollywood, CA.

=== Internet ===
- "Today's Celebirthdays". The Bullsheet. Brea, CA: New Dream Network, LLC. January 17, 2014.
