= Wesley Schultz =

American guitarist & singer (born 1982)

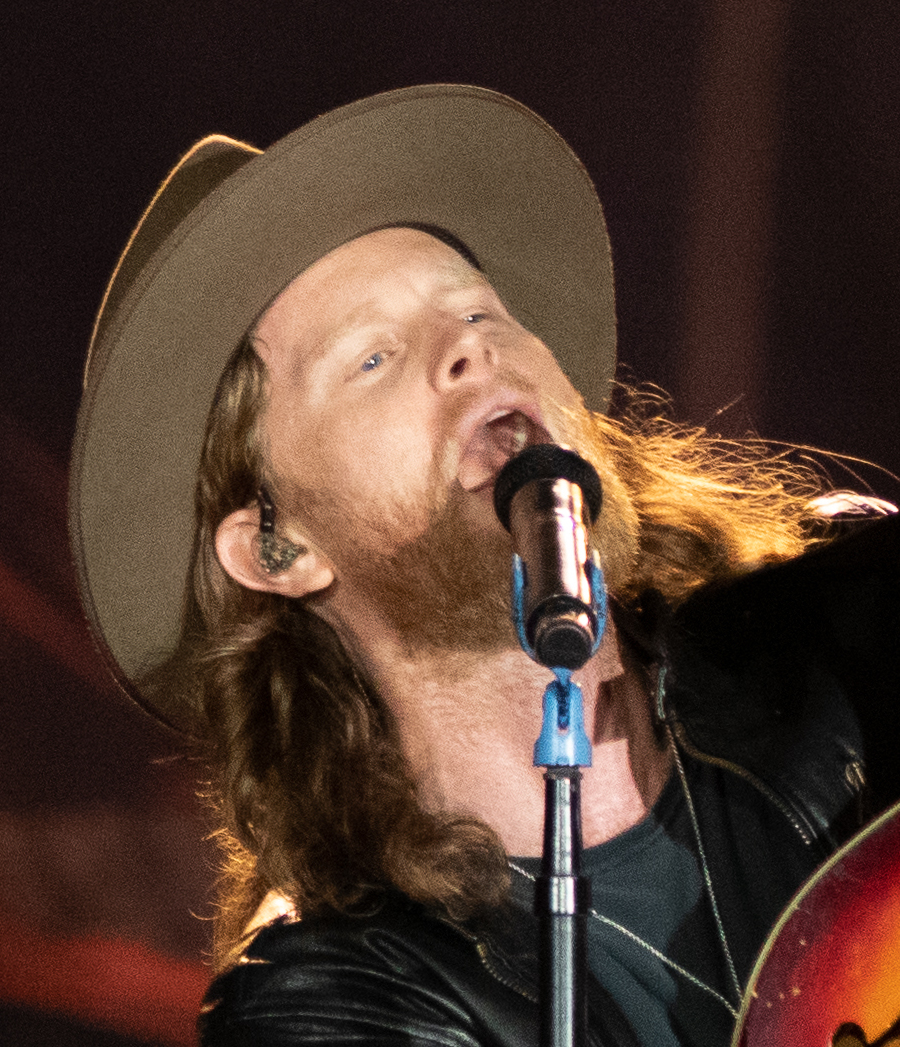
- Schultz performing in 2022

Background information
- Born: Wesley Keith Schultz; December 30, 1982 (age 43)
- Origin: Ramsey, New Jersey, U.S.
- Instruments: Vocals; guitar
- Years active: 2005–present
- Member of: The Lumineers
- Website: thelumineers.com

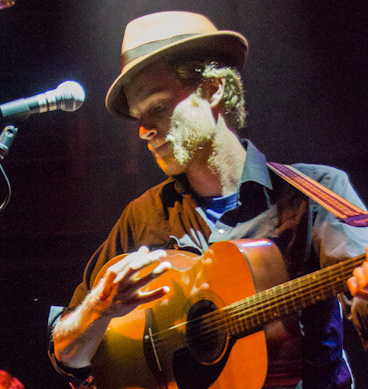
Schultz performing in 2012

Wesley Keith Schultz (born December 30, 1982) is an American musician. He is the guitarist and lead vocalist for the folk rock band the Lumineers.

== Life and career ==
Schultz grew up in Ramsey, New Jersey, the son of clinical psychologist Dr Michael J. Schultz (died 2007) and Judy (née Kinyon), and attended Ramsey High School and the University of Richmond. At the time The Lumineers released their first album, their press release highlighted the fact that Schultz, then age 9, had been quoted in a 1992 story in The New York Times. In that story (a profile of Dennis Kobray, who since 1986 has performed the award-winning musical/ acting show "Meet the Musicians", as part of which he tours elementary schools imitating classical composers as a way to introduce children to classical music), 9-year-old Schultz is quoted as saying: "I spend a lot of time on my drawings and it turns out good 'cause I've been practicing a lot."

Growing up in Ramsey, Schultz's best friend was Josh Fraites. Fraites died of a drug overdose in 2002, at the age of 19. In the wake of Josh's death, Schultz connected with Josh's younger brother Jeremiah Fraites, a drummer, and the two "found solace in music, writing songs and playing gigs around New York City." The two toured under various names including Wesley Jeremiah and Six Cheeks, and released a self-titled EP, including future The Lumineers songs, "Flowers In Your Hair" and "Darlene".

Frustrated by their band's limited success in New York, and struggling with the high cost of living, Schultz and Fraites decided to relocate to Denver, where they could dedicate more time to working on their music and touring. Upon arriving in Denver, they placed a Craigslist ad for a classical cellist. Neyla Pekarek responded to their ad and ultimately became the third member of the Lumineers. The trio spent the next year playing gigs around Denver and touring nationally at their own expense.

In 2012 The Lumineers released their first album, The Lumineers. Three songs from that album (all co-written by Schultz and Fraites) have charted: "Ho Hey", "Stubborn Love", and "Submarines".

In 2013 the band released a deluxe edition of their self-titled album. It included 5 bonus tracks, over 25 minutes of video footage, and a 28-page booklet.

In 2016 Schultz sang "Honey Pie" in Beat Bugs episode 12b.

In 2016 The Lumineers released the album Cleopatra. The songs were written in the four years after the first album, The Lumineers, was released.

In 2019, the Lumineers released their third album, III. The album title references that the album is presented in three chapters, each focusing on a different main character of the fictional Sparks family.

On October 25, 2020 Schultz announced that a 10-song solo album containing covers entitled Vignettes would be released that Friday, October 30. He defined the album as a love letter to the songs he played in bars and coffee shops at the beginning of his music career.

Schultz had previously released a version of Eric Clapton's song "Bell Bottom Blues" on September 3, which was included on the album.

== Songwriting credits ==
Year	Artist	Song	Co-written with	U.S. peak position	U.K. peak position
2012	The Lumineers	"Ho Hey"	Jeremiah Fraites	3	8
2012	The Lumineers	"Stubborn Love"	Jeremiah Fraites	70	—
