= Dualtone Records =

American record label

- Parent company: MNRK Music Group
- Founded: 2001
- Founder: Scott Robinson, Dan Herrington
- Distributor: Alternative Distribution Alliance
- Genre: Americana, folk, rock
- Country of origin: U.S.
- Location: Nashville, Tennessee
- Official website: www.dualtone.com

Dualtone Records is an American record label specializing in folk, Americana, and indie rock. It was founded in 2001 by Scott Robinson and Dan Herrington. The company is run by Robinson and the label's president, Paul Roper. Albums are distributed by the Alternative Distribution Alliance. On January 20, 2016, Entertainment One acquired Dualtone Records. Later, Dualtone's parent company eOne Music was acquired by The Blackstone Group in June 2021, with eOne Music rebranded as MNRK Music Group in September 2021.

== History ==
Dualtone has been nominated for sixteen Grammy Awards, winning four. The label celebrated its 20th year in 2021.

Its first year in business brought a number 2 hit at country radio for David Ball's "Riding with Private Malone". The album Amigo went on to sell over 350,000 copies.

June Carter Cash's posthumous album Wildwood Flower was released in 2003. Including some of the final duets between her and husband Johnny Cash, the album went on to win two GRAMMY awards.

Brett Dennen's breakout album So Much More was released in 2006. "Ain't No Reason" from that album is now over 500,000 in all in sales. The label also released Dennen's second album Hope for the Hopeless in 2008 and Loverboy in 2011.

The Lumineers' self-titled debut album was released in April 2012 and was certified platinum in the US on February 20, 2013. The album is now over 3 million all in sales.

In 2014, Guy Clark's My Favorite Picture of You won the Grammy Award for Best Folk Album at the 56th Annual Grammy Awards.

Shakey Graves And the War Came also was released in 2014. Shakey went on to win Best Emerging Artist at the 2015 Americana Awards. And the War Came is approaching 200,000 sold with breakout single Dearly Departed over 400,000.

The Lumineers' second album Cleopatra was the first album of 2016 from an independent label to debut at No. 1 with over 120,000 albums sold. The album is now over 1.5 million.

In October 2016 on Chuck Berry's 90th birthday, Dualtone announced an album of new material coming in 2017. Berry's 20th and final studio album, Chuck, was released posthumously on June 9, 2017. In September 2017, Dualtone (via eOne and Ole) became the official US song publisher for Berry's catalogue.

Mt. Joy was signed in 2017 and released their breakthrough single "Silver Lining" in November which went on to go to number 1 at AAA. The band's self titled album is over 160 million streams in the US. Recently the label has added Amos Lee, Angie McMahon, Hayes Carll, Gregory Alan Isakov, Kathleen Edwards and The Lone Bellow to the roster. Angie McMahon won the coveted Grulke prize at SXSW in 2019 and her breakout single "Slow Mover" was certified Gold in Australia. Gregory Alan Isakov's album Evening Machines landed at number 1 on the Billboard Americana/Folk chart on release and went on to be nominated for a GRAMMY for Best Folk Album.

The Lumineers' third album III was released September 13, 2019 and debuted at number 1 on the Billboard Independent Chart.

== Current roster ==
- Abraham Alexander
- Amos Lee
- Chuck Berry
- The Dip
- Flipturn
- Gregory Alan Isakov
- Guy Clark
- Houndmouth
- Kathleen Edwards
- Langhorne Slim
- The Lone Bellow
- The Lumineers
- Mountain Grass Unit
- Mt. Joy (band)
- Robert Earl Keen
- Shakey Graves
- Shovels & Rope
- The Wild Reeds
