= Pentatonix World Tour =

2016–17 concert tour by Pentatonix

- Tour by Pentatonix
- Associated albums: Pentatonix; PTX, Vol. IV: Classics
- Start date: April 2, 2016
- End date: September 3, 2017
- Legs: 7
- No. of shows: 106
- Box office: $11,641,644

Pentatonix concert chronology
- On My Way Home Tour (2015); Pentatonix World Tour (2016–17); A Pentatonix Christmas Tour (2017)

Pentatonix World Tour was the fifth headlining concert tour by American a cappella group Pentatonix to promote their eponymous album. The tour began in Chiba on April 2, 2016, and concluded in Essex Junction on September 3, 2017.

== Background and development ==
On February 9, 2016, Pentatonix announced the tour. The group announced the first leg taking place in the United States and Canada with Us The Duo and AJ Lehrman as the opening acts. The leg ran from April 13, 2016, until May 12, 2016. On February 23, 2016, Popspring 2016 announced the group as a headliner of the festival in Chiba, Kobe, and Nagoya. The second leg took place across Europe. The leg ran from May 23, 2016, until June 26, 2016. Us The Duo stayed on the road, in addition to Erato who opened in just Birmingham and London. On April 2, 2016, Summer Sonic Festival announced the group as a headliner of the festival in Chiba and Osaka. The third leg took place across Oceania. The leg ran from September 3, 2016, until September 10, 2016. The fourth leg took place across Asia. The leg ran from September 13, 2016, until September 27, 2016. The fifth leg took place back in the United States and Canada with Us The Duo returning as the opening act, and newly added, Abi Ann, who was a fellow opening act when they opened Kelly Clarkson's Piece by Piece Tour. The leg ran from October 17, 2016, until November 22, 2016. Continuing the tour, the group announced a number of special performances for the summer of 2017. They kicked off their 2017 shows with another Asian leg with five shows in Japan. They also toured North America starting with three shows in Los Angeles at the Hollywood Bowl for the venue's July 4 Firework Spectacular, and a number of shows at fairs and festivals in Columbus, West Allis, Des Moines, Grand Island, Highland Park, Saint Paul, Allentown, and Essex Junction.

== Set list ==
This set list is representative of the show on November 10, 2016, in Newark, New Jersey. It is not representative of all concerts for the duration of the tour.

1. "Cracked"
2. "Na Na Na"
3. "Cheerleader" (OMI cover)
4. "Can't Sleep Love"
5. "Evolution of Michael Jackson"
6. "Love Yourself" / "Where Are Ü Now" (Justin Bieber and Skrillex & Diplo cover medley)
7. "Jolene" (Dolly Parton cover; duet with Us The Duo)
8. "Prelude from Cello Suite No. 1" (Bach cello cover from Kevin)
9. "Radioactive" / "Say Something" / "Papaoutai" (Imagine Dragons, A Great Big World, and Stromae cover medley)
10. "No" (Meghan Trainor cover)
11. "Gold" (Kiiara cover)
12. "Misbehavin'"
13. "Water"
14. "Christus factus est" (by Anton Bruckner)
15. "Aha!" (Imogen Heap cover)
16. "Daft Punk"
17. "Rose Gold"
18. "Hallelujah" (Leonard Cohen cover)

Encore

1. "Light In The Hallway"
2. "Sing"

== Tour dates ==
List of concerts, showing date, city, country, venue, opening act, tickets sold, number of available tickets and amount of gross revenue
Date	City	Country	Venue	Opening acts	Attendance	Revenue
Asia
April 2, 2016 (Note: The concerts on April 2–4, 2016 are part of Popspring 2016.)	Chiba	Japan	Makuhari Messe	—N/a	—N/a	—N/a
April 3, 2016	Kobe	Japan	World Memorial Hall	—N/a	—N/a	—N/a
April 4, 2016	Nagoya	Japan	Zepp Nagoya	—N/a	—N/a	—N/a
Leg 1 - North America
April 13, 2016	Sunrise	United States	BB&T Center	Us The Duo; AJ Lehrman	4,609 / 7,008	$250,805
April 14, 2016	Orlando	United States	CFE Arena	Us The Duo; AJ Lehrman	6,961 / 7,470	$388,055
April 16, 2016	Birmingham	United States	Legacy Arena	Us The Duo; AJ Lehrman	6,314 / 6,314	$337,160
April 17, 2016	St. Louis	United States	Chaifetz Arena	Us The Duo; AJ Lehrman	6,341 / 7,569	$342,511
April 19, 2016	Kansas City	United States	Sprint Center	Us The Duo; AJ Lehrman	6,657 / 6,657	$375,094
April 21, 2016	Broomfield	United States	1stBank Center	Us The Duo; AJ Lehrman	5,698 / 5,930	$336,596
April 23, 2016	Las Vegas	United States	Mandalay Bay Events Center	Us The Duo; AJ Lehrman	—N/a	—N/a
April 24, 2016	Berkeley	United States	Hearst Greek Theatre	Us The Duo; AJ Lehrman	7,340 / 7,340	$343,160
April 26, 2016	Portland	United States	Theater of the Clouds	Us The Duo; AJ Lehrman	6,447 / 6,715	$326,727
April 27, 2016	Seattle	United States	WaMu Theater	Us The Duo; AJ Lehrman	4,518 / 4,606	$278,530
April 28, 2016	Vancouver	Canada	Pacific Coliseum	Us The Duo; AJ Lehrman	—N/a	—N/a
April 30, 2016	Santa Barbara	United States	Santa Barbara Bowl	Us The Duo; AJ Lehrman	4,072 / 4,563	$206,909
May 1, 2016	Los Angeles	United States	Microsoft Theater	Us The Duo; AJ Lehrman	6,505 / 6,505	$389,308
May 3, 2016	San Diego	United States	Cal Coast Credit Union; Open Air Theatre	Us The Duo; AJ Lehrman	—N/a	—N/a
May 4, 2016	Phoenix	United States	Comerica Theatre	Us The Duo; AJ Lehrman	—N/a	—N/a
May 5, 2016	Las Cruces	United States	Pan American Center	Us The Duo; AJ Lehrman	—N/a	—N/a
May 7, 2016	Tulsa	United States	BOK Center	Us The Duo; AJ Lehrman	10,066 / 10,066	$396,030
May 8, 2016	Austin	United States	Frank Erwin Center	Us The Duo; AJ Lehrman	6,183 / 6,973	$366,908
May 10, 2016	Nashville	United States	Bridgestone Arena	Us The Duo; AJ Lehrman	—N/a	—N/a
May 11, 2016 (Note: The concert on May 11, 2016 at the Red Hat Amphitheater in Raleigh, North Carolina was live streamed through Yahoo Screen.)	Raleigh	United States	Red Hat Amphitheater	Us The Duo; AJ Lehrman	—N/a	—N/a
May 12, 2016	Columbia	United States	Merriweather Post Pavilion	Us The Duo; AJ Lehrman	8,244 / 14,780	$452,995
May 15, 2016 (Note: The concert on May 15, 2016 at Amphitheater At Quarry Park in Rocklin is part of KDND Wake Up Call Birthday Bash.)	Rocklin	United States	Amphitheater At Quarry Park	—N/a	—N/a	—N/a
Leg 2 - Europe
May 23, 2016	Dublin	Ireland	Olympia Theatre	Us The Duo	—N/a	—N/a
May 25, 2016	Birmingham	England	O_{2} Academy Birmingham	Us The Duo; Erato	—N/a	—N/a
May 26, 2016	London	England	O_{2} Academy Brixton	Us The Duo; Erato	—N/a	—N/a
May 28, 2016	Manchester	England	Albert Hall	Us The Duo	—N/a	—N/a
May 30, 2016	Paris	France	Zénith Paris	Us The Duo	—N/a	—N/a
June 1, 2016	Amsterdam	Netherlands	Heineken Music Hall	Us The Duo	—N/a	—N/a
June 2, 2016	Antwerp	Belgium	Lotto Arena	Us The Duo	2,922 / 5,628	$104,177
June 4, 2016	Cologne	Germany	Cologne Palladium	Us The Duo	—N/a	—N/a
June 5, 2016	Esch-sur-Alzette	Luxembourg	Rockhal	Us The Duo	—N/a	—N/a
June 6, 2016	Hamburg	Germany	Stadtpark	Us The Duo	—N/a	—N/a
June 8, 2016	Berlin	Germany	Zitadelle Spandau	Us The Duo	—N/a	—N/a
June 9, 2016	Prague	Czech Republic	Forum Karlin	Us The Duo	—N/a	—N/a
June 11, 2016	Munich	Germany	Zenith Kulturhalle	Us The Duo	—N/a	—N/a
June 12, 2016	Vienna	Austria	Wiener Stadthalle	Us The Duo	—N/a	—N/a
June 14, 2016	Zürich	Switzerland	Hallenstadion	Us The Duo	3,559 / 4,500	$228,003
June 15, 2016	Linz	Austria	TipsArena Linz	Us The Duo	—N/a	—N/a
June 16, 2016	Frankfurt	Germany	Jahrhunderthalle	Us The Duo	—N/a	—N/a
June 18, 2016	Rome	Italy	Atlántico	Us The Duo	—N/a	—N/a
June 19, 2016	Milan	Italy	Alcatraz	Us The Duo	—N/a	—N/a
June 22, 2016	Barcelona	Spain	Sant Jordi Club	Us The Duo	—N/a	—N/a
June 23, 2016	Madrid	Spain	Palacio Vistalegre	Us The Duo	—N/a	—N/a
June 25, 2016	Lisbon	Portugal	Coliseu dos Recreios	Us The Duo	—N/a	—N/a
June 26, 2016	Porto	Portugal	Coliseu do Porto	Us The Duo	—N/a	—N/a
Asia
August 20, 2016 (Note: The concerts on August 20 & 21, 2016 are part of Summer Sonic Festival.)	Chiba	Japan	Chiba Marine Stadium	—N/a	—N/a	—N/a
August 21, 2016	Osaka	Japan	Maishima Sports Island	—N/a	—N/a	—N/a
Leg 3 - Oceania
September 3, 2016	Sydney	Australia	Enmore Theatre	—N/a	—N/a	—N/a
September 4, 2016	Brisbane	Australia	Brisbane City Hall	—N/a	—N/a	—N/a
September 7, 2016	Adelaide	Australia	Entertainment Centre Theatre	—N/a	—N/a	—N/a
September 8, 2016	Melbourne	Australia	Palais Theatre	—N/a	—N/a	—N/a
September 10, 2016	Auckland	New Zealand	Vector Arena	—N/a	—N/a	—N/a
Leg 4 - Asia
September 13, 2016	Bangkok	Thailand	GMM Live Hall	—N/a	—N/a	—N/a
September 17, 2016 (Note: The concert on September 17 & 18, 2016 in Singapore are part of the Formula 1 2016 Singapore Grand Prix.)	Singapore		Marina Bay Street Circuit	—N/a	—N/a	—N/a
September 18, 2016	Singapore		Marina Bay Street Circuit	—N/a	—N/a	—N/a
September 20, 2016	Taipei	Taiwan	National Taiwan University Auditorium	—N/a	—N/a	—N/a
September 22, 2016	Hong Kong		AsiaWorld–Arena	—N/a	—N/a	—N/a
September 24, 2016	Quezon City	Philippines	Smart Araneta Coliseum	—N/a	—N/a	—N/a
September 27, 2016	Seoul	South Korea	Jamsil Arena	—N/a	—N/a	—N/a
Leg 5 - North America
October 17, 2016	San Jose	United States	SAP Center	Us The Duo; Abi Ann	5,950 / 7,000	$335,630
October 19, 2016	Sacramento	United States	Golden 1 Center	Us The Duo; Abi Ann	—N/a	—N/a
October 20, 2016	Anaheim	United States	Honda Center	Us The Duo; Abi Ann	—N/a	—N/a
October 22, 2016	West Valley City	United States	Maverik Center	Us The Duo; Abi Ann	—N/a	—N/a
October 24, 2016	Sioux Falls	United States	Denny Sanford Premier Center	Us The Duo; Abi Ann	—N/a	—N/a
October 26, 2016	Saint Paul	United States	Xcel Energy Center	Us The Duo; Abi Ann	9,323 / 10,081	$526,259
October 27, 2016	Rosemont	United States	Allstate Arena	Us The Duo; Abi Ann	7,683 / 11,870	$511,688
October 29, 2016	Champaign	United States	State Farm Center	Us The Duo; Abi Ann	—N/a	—N/a
October 30, 2016	Columbus	United States	Schottenstein Center	Us The Duo; Abi Ann	8,241 / 12,191	$463,801
November 3, 2016	Memphis	United States	FedExForum	Us The Duo; Abi Ann	4,329 / 6,200	$236,225
November 6, 2016	Auburn Hills	United States	The Palace of Auburn Hills	Us The Duo; Abi Ann	6,218 / 6,622	$391,398
November 7, 2016	Toronto	Canada	Air Canada Centre	Us The Duo; Abi Ann	8,726 / 12,597	$405,949
November 9, 2016	Boston	United States	TD Garden	Us The Duo; Abi Ann	—N/a	—N/a
November 10, 2016	Newark	United States	Prudential Center	Us The Duo; Abi Ann	6,636 / 11,750	$374,792
November 12, 2016	Uncasville	United States	Mohegan Sun Arena	Us The Duo; Abi Ann	6,885 / 7,331	$380,555
November 13, 2016	Philadelphia	United States	Liacouras Center	Us The Duo; Abi Ann	5,897 / 8,174	$374,490
November 15, 2016	Greenville	United States	Bon Secours Wellness Arena	Us The Duo; Abi Ann	6,656 / 7,257	$405,276
November 16, 2016	Duluth	United States	Infinite Energy Arena	Us The Duo; Abi Ann	7,381 / 7,652	$453,210
November 17, 2016	New Orleans	United States	Lakefront Arena	Us The Duo; Abi Ann	3,458 / 4,800	$213,111
November 19, 2016	Oklahoma City	United States	Chesapeake Energy Arena	Us The Duo; Abi Ann	—N/a	—N/a
November 20, 2016	Dallas	United States	American Airlines Center	Us The Duo; Abi Ann	11,995 / 11,995	$694,410
November 22, 2016	Houston	United States	Toyota Center	Us The Duo; Abi Ann	7,129 / 7,508	$438,889
Leg 6 - Asia
May 25, 2017	Fukuoka	Japan	Fukuoka Sun Palace	—N/a	—N/a	—N/a
May 27, 2017	Tokyo	Japan	Tokyo International Forum	—N/a	—N/a	—N/a
May 29, 2017	Nagoya	Japan	Nagoya Century Hall	—N/a	—N/a	—N/a
May 30, 2017	Osaka	Japan	Osaka Festival Hall	—N/a	—N/a	—N/a
May 31, 2017	Tokyo	Japan	Tokyo International Forum	—N/a	—N/a	—N/a
Leg 7 - North America
July 2, 2017	Los Angeles	United States	Hollywood Bowl	—N/a	—N/a	—N/a
July 3, 2017	Los Angeles	United States	Hollywood Bowl	—N/a	—N/a	—N/a
July 4, 2017	Los Angeles	United States	Hollywood Bowl	—N/a	—N/a	—N/a
August 5, 2017	Columbus	United States	Celeste Center	Us The Duo	—N/a	—N/a
August 6, 2017	Cincinnati	United States	PNC Pavilion	Us The Duo	—N/a	—N/a
August 8, 2017	West Allis	United States	Wisconsin State Fair Park	Us The Duo	—N/a	—N/a
August 9, 2017	Rochester Hills	United States	Meadow Brook Amphitheatre	Us The Duo	7,596 / 7,738	$309,625
August 10, 2017	Indianapolis	United States	White River State Park	Us The Duo	6,137 / 6,484	$235,568
August 12, 2017	Springfield	United States	Illinois State Fair	Us The Duo	—N/a	—N/a
August 13, 2017	Des Moines	United States	Iowa State Fairgrounds	Us The Duo	—N/a	—N/a
August 26, 2017	Grand Island	United States	Nebraska State Fair Park	Us The Duo	—N/a	—N/a
August 27, 2017	Bonner Springs	United States	Providence Medical Center Amphitheater	Us The Duo	—N/a	—N/a
August 28, 2017	Highland Park	United States	Ravinia Pavilion	Us The Duo	—N/a	—N/a
August 30, 2017	Saint Paul	United States	Minnesota State Fair Grandstand	Us The Duo	—N/a	—N/a
August 31, 2017	St. Louis	United States	Fox Theatre	Us The Duo	—N/a	—N/a
September 2, 2017	Allentown	United States	Great Allentown Fair Grandstand	Us The Duo	—N/a	—N/a
September 3, 2017 (Note: The concert on September 3, 2017 in Vermont was Avi Kaplan’s last show with Pentatonix before his departure from the group.)	Essex Junction	United States	Champlain Valley Exposition	Us The Duo	—N/a	—N/a
