= Brightside World Tour =

2022 concert tour by the Lumineers

- Tour by the Lumineers
- Location: North America; Europe
- Associated album: Brightside
- Start date: February 24, 2022
- End date: September 3, 2022
- Legs: 2
- No. of shows: 62
- Supporting acts: Gregory Alan Isakov; CAAMP; Daniel Rodríguez; James Bay

the Lumineers concert chronology
- III: The World Tour (2019–20); Brightside World Tour (2022)

The Brightside World Tour was the fourth concert tour by American folk rock band the Lumineers, in support of their fourth studio album, Brightside (2022). The tour began on February 24, 2022, in Nottingham, and concluded on September 3, 2022, in Chicago.

== Background ==
On May 20, 2021, the band first announced tour dates in Europe for early 2022. These dates were originally announced as a standalone leg before Brightside was first announced. On February 8, 2022, the band then officially announced the Brightside World Tour, making the European leg now part of the tour, along with announcing North American dates for summer 2022. The tour was set to begin on February 1, 2022, in Prague, but instead began on February 24, 2022, in Nottingham due to ongoing concerns of the COVID-19 pandemic. Several shows from this tour were rescheduled from III: The World Tour back in 2020. Tickets from the postponed III: The World Tour dates were honored at the new dates for this tour.

== Tour dates ==
List of European concerts
| Date | City | Country | Venue | Opening acts | Attendance | Revenue |
|---|---|---|---|---|---|---|
| February 24, 2022 | Nottingham | England | Motorpoint Arena | Gregory Alan Isakov | — | — |
| February 25, 2022 | Glasgow | Scotland | OVO Hydro | Gregory Alan Isakov | — | — |
| February 27, 2022 | Dublin | Ireland | 3Arena | Gregory Alan Isakov | — | — |
| March 2, 2022 | Manchester | England | AO Arena | Gregory Alan Isakov | — | — |
| March 4, 2022 | London | England | The O_{2} Arena | Gregory Alan Isakov | — | — |
| March 7, 2022 | Madrid | Spain | WiZink Center | Gregory Alan Isakov | — | — |
| March 9, 2022 | Antwerp | Belgium | Lotto Arena | Gregory Alan Isakov | — | — |
| March 10, 2022 | Amsterdam | Netherlands | AFAS Live | Gregory Alan Isakov | — | — |
| March 11, 2022 | Paris | France | Zénith Paris | Gregory Alan Isakov | — | — |
| March 14, 2022 | Oslo | Norway | Sentrum Scene | Gregory Alan Isakov | — | — |
| March 16, 2022 | Warsaw | Poland | Arena COS Torwar | Gregory Alan Isakov | — | — |
| June 24, 2023 | Ferrara | Italy | Piazza Trento Trieste | Abraham Alexander | — | — |

List of North American concerts
| Date | City | Country | Venue | Opening acts | Attendance | Revenue |
|---|---|---|---|---|---|---|
| March 20, 2022 (Note: The concert on March 20, 2022 is part of Innings Festival.) | Tampa | United States | Raymond James Stadium | —N/a | —N/a | —N/a |
| May 17, 2022 | Jacksonville | United States | Daily's Place | CAAMP | — | — |
| May 18, 2022 | Jacksonville | United States | Daily's Place | CAAMP | — | — |
| May 20, 2022 | West Palm Beach | United States | iTHINK Financial Amphitheatre | CAAMP | — | — |
| May 21, 2022 | Charleston | United States | Credit One Stadium | CAAMP | — | — |
| May 24, 2022 | Raleigh | United States | Coastal Credit Union Music Park | CAAMP | — | — |
| May 25, 2022 | Columbia | United States | Merriweather Post Pavilion | CAAMP | — | — |
| May 27, 2022 | Canandaigua | United States | Marvin Sands Performing Arts Center | CAAMP | — | — |
| May 28, 2022 | Holmdel | United States | PNC Bank Arts Center | CAAMP | — | — |
| May 29, 2022 | Saratoga Springs | United States | Saratoga Performing Arts Center | CAAMP | — | — |
| June 1, 2022 | Gilford | United States | Bank of New Hampshire Pavilion | CAAMP | — | — |
| June 3, 2022 | Mansfield | United States | Xfinity Center | CAAMP | — | — |
| June 4, 2022 | Camden | United States | Freedom Mortgage Pavilion | CAAMP | — | — |
| June 7, 2022 | Cincinnati | United States | Riverbend Music Center | CAAMP | — | — |
| June 8, 2022 | Maryland Heights | United States | Hollywood Casino Amphitheatre | CAAMP | — | — |
| June 10, 2022 | Clarkston | United States | Pine Knob Music Theatre | CAAMP | — | — |
| June 11, 2022 | Toronto | Canada | Budweiser Stage | CAAMP | — | — |
| June 12, 2022 | Toronto | Canada | Budweiser Stage | CAAMP | — | — |
| June 14, 2022 | Noblesville | United States | Ruoff Music Center | CAAMP | — | — |
| June 15, 2022 | Burgettstown | United States | The Pavilion at Star Lake | CAAMP | — | — |
| June 17, 2022 | New York City | United States | Forest Hills Stadium | CAAMP | — | — |
| June 18, 2022 | New York City | United States | Forest Hills Stadium | CAAMP | — | — |
| July 8, 2022 | Grand Rapids | United States | Van Andel Arena | Ashe | — | — |
| July 9, 2022 (Note: The concert on July 9, 2022 is part of WonderStruck Festival.) | Kirtland | United States | Lakeland Community College | —N/a | —N/a | —N/a |
| July 12, 2022 | Boise | United States | ExtraMile Arena | Gregory Alan Isakov; Daniel Rodríguez | — | — |
| July 14, 2022 | Portland | United States | Moda Center | Gregory Alan Isakov; Daniel Rodríguez | — | — |
| July 16, 2022 | George | United States | The Gorge Amphitheatre | Gregory Alan Isakov; Daniel Rodríguez | — | — |
| July 17, 2022 | Vancouver | Canada | Rogers Arena | Gregory Alan Isakov; Daniel Rodríguez | — | — |
| July 20, 2022 | West Valley City | United States | Maverik Center | Gregory Alan Isakov; Daniel Rodríguez | — | — |
| July 22, 2022 | Denver | United States | Coors Field | Gregory Alan Isakov; Daniel Rodríguez | — | — |
| July 24, 2022 | Paradise | United States | MGM Grand Garden Arena | Gregory Alan Isakov; Daniel Rodríguez | — | — |
| July 26, 2022 | Glendale | United States | Gila River Arena | Gregory Alan Isakov; Daniel Rodríguez | — | — |
| July 27, 2022 | San Diego | United States | Pechanga Arena | Gregory Alan Isakov; Daniel Rodríguez | — | — |
| July 29, 2022 | Los Angeles | United States | Crypto.com Arena | Gregory Alan Isakov; Daniel Rodríguez | — | — |
| August 2, 2022 | Sacramento | United States | Golden 1 Center | Gregory Alan Isakov; Daniel Rodríguez | — | — |
| August 3, 2022 | San Francisco | United States | Chase Center | Gregory Alan Isakov; Daniel Rodríguez | — | — |
| August 6, 2022 | Calgary | Canada | Scotiabank Saddledome | Gregory Alan Isakov; Daniel Rodríguez | — | — |
| August 7, 2022 | Edmonton | Canada | Rogers Place | Gregory Alan Isakov; Daniel Rodríguez | — | — |
| August 9, 2022 | Saskatoon | Canada | SaskTel Centre | Gregory Alan Isakov; Daniel Rodríguez | — | — |
| August 10, 2022 | Winnipeg | Canada | Canada Life Centre | Gregory Alan Isakov; Daniel Rodríguez | — | — |
| August 12, 2022 | Saint Paul | United States | Xcel Energy Center | Gregory Alan Isakov; Daniel Rodríguez | — | — |
| August 13, 2022 | Kansas City | United States | T-Mobile Center | Gregory Alan Isakov; Daniel Rodríguez | — | — |
| August 16, 2022 | Omaha | United States | CHI Health Center | Gregory Alan Isakov; Daniel Rodríguez | — | — |
| August 17, 2022 | Tulsa | United States | BOK Center | James Bay | — | — |
| August 19, 2022 | Dallas | United States | American Airlines Center | James Bay | — | — |
| August 20, 2022 | Austin | United States | Moody Center | James Bay | — | — |
| August 23, 2022 | Orlando | United States | Amway Center | James Bay | — | — |
| August 24, 2022 | Savannah | United States | Enmarket Arena | James Bay | — | — |
| August 26, 2022 | Atlanta | United States | State Farm Arena | James Bay | — | — |
| August 27, 2022 | Charlotte | United States | Spectrum Center | James Bay | — | — |
| August 31, 2022 | Louisville | United States | KFC Yum! Center | James Bay | — | — |
| September 1, 2022 | Nashville | United States | Bridgestone Arena | James Bay | — | — |
| September 3, 2022 | Chicago | United States | Wrigley Field | CAAMP; James Bay | — | — |
