= III: The World Tour =

2019–20 concert tour by the Lumineers

- Tour by The Lumineers
- Location: North America; Europe; Oceania; Asia; Latin America
- Associated album: III
- Start date: May 19, 2019
- End date: March 11, 2020
- Legs: 5
- No. of shows: 56
- Supporting acts: Mt. Joy; J.S. Ondara; Diana DeMuth; Gregory Alan Isakov; Daniel Rodríguez

The Lumineers concert chronology
- Cleopatra World Tour (2016–17); III: The World Tour (2019–20); Brightside World Tour (2022)

III: The World Tour is the third concert tour by American folk rock band the Lumineers, in support of their third studio album, III (2019). The tour began in Gulf Shores on May 19, 2019, and concluded prematurely on March 11, 2020 in Milwaukee due to the COVID-19 pandemic.

== Background ==
On April 2, 2019, the band first announced they would release their third studio album on September 13, 2019. During the week of the announcement, they announced their first single, "Gloria", and announced European tour dates. Prior to the April announcements, the band had already planned festival performances and special shows leading up to the album release. On August 1, 2019, the band announced North American tour dates. On September 17, 2019, due to phenomenal demand, additional North American dates were announced, prompting second shows in Brooklyn, Rosemont, and Toronto, and newly announced cities. On January 22, 2020, more North American dates were announced for later in the year, including their first stadium show in their hometown of Denver at Coors Field. On March 12, 2020, the band originally postponed the last two shows of the first North American leg to September 2020 due to COVID-19 pandemic. As the pandemic worsened, all 2020 dates had to be either postponed to 2021 (which were later cancelled), or ultimately cancelled, which included the second North American leg, the second European leg, and festival appearances, which ultimately made March 11, 2020, the official last date of the III: The World Tour.

== Set list ==
This set list is from the concert on November 2, 2019 in Madrid. It is not intended to represent all shows from the tour.

1. "Sleep on the Floor"
2. "Cleopatra"
3. "Life in the City"
4. "Submarines"
5. "Dead Sea"
6. "Leader of the Landslide"
7. "Gun Song"
8. "Flowers in Your Hair"
9. "Ho Hey"
10. "Ophelia"
11. "Gloria"
12. "It Wasn’t Easy to Be Happy for You"
13. "Charlie Boy"
14. "My Cell"
15. "Jimmy Sparks"
16. "April"
17. "Salt and the Sea"
18. "Slow It Down"
19. "Big Parade"

Encore

20. "Donna"
21. "Angela"
22. "Gale Song"
23. "Stubborn Love"

== Tour dates ==
List of concerts, showing date, city, country, venue, opening acts, tickets sold, number of available tickets and amount of gross revenue
Date	City	Country	Venue	Opening acts	Attendance	Revenue
Festivals and other shows
May 19, 2019 (Note: The concert on May 19, 2019 was part of Hangout Music Festival.)	Gulf Shores	United States	Gulf Shores Beach	—N/a	—N/a	—N/a
June 2, 2019 (Note: The concert on June 2, 2019 was part of Radio 104.5 12th Birthday Celebration.)	Camden	United States	BB&T Pavilion	—N/a	—N/a	—N/a
June 15, 2019 (Note: The concert on June 15, 2019 was part of 101 WKQX PIQNIQ.)	Tinley Park	United States	Hollywood Casino Amphitheatre	—N/a	—N/a	—N/a
June 16, 2019 (Note: The concert on June 16, 2019 was part of Bonnaroo Music Festival.)	Manchester	United States	Great Stage Park	—N/a	—N/a	—N/a
June 22, 2019 (Note: The concert on June 22, 2019 was part of Alt 92.3 Summer Open.)	New York City	United States	Forest Hills Stadium	—N/a	—N/a	—N/a
June 29, 2019 (Note: The concert on June 29, 2019 was part of Tinderbox Music Festival.)	Odense	Denmark	Tusindårsskoven	—N/a	—N/a	—N/a
July 21, 2019 (Note: The concert on July 21, 2019 was part of Splendour in the Grass 2019.)	Byron Bay	Australia	North Byron Parklands	—N/a	—N/a	—N/a
July 22, 2019	Sydney	Australia	Enmore Theatre	—N/a	—N/a	—N/a
July 26, 2019 (Note: The concert on July 26, 2019 was part of Fuji Rock Festival.)	Yuzawa	Japan	Naeba Ski Resort	—N/a	—N/a	—N/a
August 2, 2019 (Note: The concert on August 2, 2019 was part of Osheaga Festival.)	Montreal	Canada	Parc Jean-Drapeau	—N/a	—N/a	—N/a
August 7, 2019	Denver	United States	Mission Ballroom	—N/a	—N/a	—N/a
August 9, 2019 (Note: The concert on August 9, 2019 was part of Outside Lands Music and Arts Festival.)	San Francisco	United States	Golden Gate Park	—N/a	—N/a	—N/a
September 21, 2019 (Note: The concert on September 21, 2019 was part of Sea.Hear.Now Festival.)	Asbury Park	United States	North Beach Asbury Park	—N/a	—N/a	—N/a
Europe
November 1, 2019	Lisbon	Portugal	Campo Pequeno	—N/a	—N/a	—N/a
November 2, 2019	Madrid	Spain	WiZink Center	—N/a	—N/a	—N/a
November 4, 2019	Milan	Italy	Alcatraz	—N/a	—N/a	—N/a
November 6, 2019	Zürich	Switzerland	Halle 622	—N/a	—N/a	—N/a
November 7, 2019	Munich	Germany	Kulturhalle Zenith	—N/a	—N/a	—N/a
November 9, 2019	Vienna	Austria	Bank Austria Halle	—N/a	—N/a	—N/a
November 10, 2019	Prague	Czech Republic	Forum Karlin	—N/a	—N/a	—N/a
November 13, 2019	Hamburg	Germany	Alsterdorfer Sporthalle	—N/a	—N/a	—N/a
November 14, 2019	Berlin	Germany	Verti Music Hall	—N/a	—N/a	—N/a
November 16, 2019	Brussels	Belgium	Ancienne Belgique	—N/a	—N/a	—N/a
November 18, 2019	Utrecht	Netherlands	TivoliVredenburg	—N/a	—N/a	—N/a
November 19, 2019	Cologne	Germany	Palladium Köln	—N/a	—N/a	—N/a
November 20, 2019	Paris	France	Zénith Paris	—N/a	—N/a	—N/a
November 22, 2019	Glasgow	Scotland	SSE Hydro	—N/a	—N/a	—N/a
November 24, 2019	Manchester	England	Manchester Arena	—N/a	—N/a	—N/a
November 27, 2019	London	England	The O_{2} Arena	—N/a	—N/a	—N/a
November 29, 2019	Dublin	Ireland	3Arena	—N/a	—N/a	—N/a
North America
December 7, 2019	Chicago	United States	The Vic Theatre	—N/a	—N/a	—N/a
January 18, 2020 (Note: The concert on January 18, 2020 was part of iHeartRadio ALTer EGO.)	Inglewood	United States	The Forum	—N/a	—N/a	—N/a
January 31, 2020	Asheville	United States	Harrah's Cherokee Center	Mt. Joy; J.S. Ondara	9,986 / 9,986	$696,657
February 1, 2020	Asheville	United States	Harrah's Cherokee Center	Mt. Joy; J.S. Ondara	9,986 / 9,986	$696,657
February 4, 2020	Columbus	United States	Schottenstein Center	Mt. Joy; J.S. Ondara	11,427 / 11,427	$607,018
February 5, 2020	St. Louis	United States	Enterprise Center	Mt. Joy; J.S. Ondara	10,742 / 10,742	$534,241
February 7, 2020	Detroit	United States	Little Caesars Arena	Mt. Joy; J.S. Ondara	12,446 / 12,446	$746,916
February 8, 2020	Cleveland	United States	Rocket Mortgage FieldHouse	Mt. Joy; J.S. Ondara	12,460 / 12,460	$711,084
February 11, 2020	Grand Rapids	United States	Van Andel Arena	Mt. Joy; J.S. Ondara	9,885 / 9,885	$569,167
February 13, 2020	Brooklyn	United States	Barclays Center	Mt. Joy; J.S. Ondara	26,232 / 26,232	$1,581,252
February 14, 2020	Brooklyn	United States	Barclays Center	Mt. Joy; J.S. Ondara	26,232 / 26,232	$1,581,252
February 16, 2020	Charlottesville	United States	John Paul Jones Arena	Mt. Joy; J.S. Ondara	11,315 / 11,315	$546,198
February 18, 2020	Indianapolis	United States	Bankers Life Fieldhouse	Mt. Joy; J.S. Ondara	10,862 / 10,862	$541,920
February 19, 2020	Nashville	United States	Bridgestone Arena	Mt. Joy; J.S. Ondara	11,349 / 11,349	$673,059
February 21, 2020	Rosemont	United States	Allstate Arena	Mt. Joy; J.S. Ondara	24,239 / 24,239	$1,651,922
February 22, 2020	Rosemont	United States	Allstate Arena	Mt. Joy; J.S. Ondara	24,239 / 24,239	$1,651,922
February 25, 2020	Pittsburgh	United States	PPG Paints Arena	Mt. Joy; J.S. Ondara	11,639 / 11,639	$616,616
February 26, 2020	Buffalo	United States	KeyBank Center	Mt. Joy; J.S. Ondara	11,529 / 11,529	$603,930
February 28, 2020	Washington, D.C.	United States	Capital One Arena	Mt. Joy; J.S. Ondara	13,851 / 13,851	$900,659
February 29, 2020	Uncasville	United States	Mohegan Sun Arena	Mt. Joy; Diana DeMuth	7,296 / 7,296	$492,107
March 3, 2020	Toronto	Canada	Scotiabank Arena	Mt. Joy; J.S. Ondara	—	—
March 4, 2020	Toronto	Canada	Scotiabank Arena	Mt. Joy; J.S. Ondara	—	—
March 6, 2020	Montreal	Canada	Bell Centre	Mt. Joy; J.S. Ondara	—	—
March 7, 2020	Ottawa	Canada	Canadian Tire Centre	Mt. Joy; J.S. Ondara	—	—
March 10, 2020	Louisville	United States	KFC Yum! Center	Mt. Joy; J.S. Ondara	—	—
March 11, 2020	Milwaukee	United States	Fiserv Forum	Mt. Joy; J.S. Ondara	—	—
Total					—	—

=== Cancelled shows ===
List of cancelled concerts, showing date, city, country, venue, reason for cancellation and reference
Date	City	Country	Venue	Reason	Ref.
March 27, 2020 (Note: The concert on March 27, 2020 was supposed to be part of Lollapalooza Chile.)	Santiago	Chile	O'Higgins Park	COVID-19 pandemic	
March 29, 2020 (Note: The concert on March 29, 2020 was supposed to be part of Lollapalooza Argentina.)	San Isidro	Argentina	Hipódromo de San Isidro	COVID-19 pandemic	
March 31, 2020 (Note: The concert on March 31, 2020 was supposed to be part of Asunciónico.)	Asunción	Paraguay	Hipódromo de Asunción	COVID-19 pandemic	
April 2, 2020	São Paulo	Brazil	Audio Club	COVID-19 pandemic	
April 4, 2020 (Note: The concert on April 4, 2020 was supposed to be part of Lollapalooza Brazil.)	São Paulo	Brazil	Autódromo José Carlos Pace	COVID-19 pandemic	
May 3, 2020 (Note: The concert on May 3, 2020 was supposed to be part of New Orleans Jazz & Heritage Festival.)	New Orleans	United States	Fair Grounds Race Course	COVID-19 pandemic	
May 13, 2020	Tuscaloosa	United States	Tuscaloosa Amphitheater	COVID-19 pandemic	
May 15, 2020	The Woodlands	United States	Cynthia Woods Mitchell Pavilion	COVID-19 pandemic	
May 16, 2020	Dallas	United States	Dos Equis Pavilion	COVID-19 pandemic	
May 19, 2020	Jacksonville	United States	Daily's Place	COVID-19 pandemic	
May 20, 2020	Jacksonville	United States	Daily's Place	COVID-19 pandemic	
May 22, 2020	Tampa	United States	MidFlorida Credit Union Amphitheatre	COVID-19 pandemic	
May 23, 2020	West Palm Beach	United States	iTHINK Financial Amphitheatre	COVID-19 pandemic	
May 27, 2020	Virginia Beach	United States	Veterans United Home Loans Amphitheater	COVID-19 pandemic	
May 29, 2020	Charlotte	United States	PNC Music Pavilion	COVID-19 pandemic	
May 30, 2020	Atlanta	United States	Cellairis Amphitheatre	COVID-19 pandemic	
June 2, 2020	Raleigh	United States	Coastal Credit Union Music Park	COVID-19 pandemic	
June 5, 2020 (Note: The concert on June 5, 2020 was supposed to be part of Radio 104.5 13th Birthday Celebration.)	Camden	United States	BB&T Pavilion	COVID-19 pandemic	
June 6, 2020	Saratoga Springs	United States	Saratoga Performing Arts Center	COVID-19 pandemic	
June 9, 2020	Gilford	United States	Bank of New Hampshire Pavilion	COVID-19 pandemic	
June 10, 2020	Gilford	United States	Bank of New Hampshire Pavilion	COVID-19 pandemic	
June 12, 2020	Mansfield	United States	Xfinity Center	COVID-19 pandemic	
June 13, 2020	New York City	United States	Forest Hills Stadium	COVID-19 pandemic	
June 25, 2020 (Note: The concert on June 25, 2020 was supposed to be part of Garorock Festival.)	Marmande	France	Plaine de la Filhole	COVID-19 pandemic	
July 2, 2020 (Note: The concert on July 2, 2020 is part of Rock Werchter.)	Werchter	Belgium	Werchter Festivalpark	COVID-19 pandemic	
July 3, 2020 (Note: The concert on July 3, 2020 is part of Eurockéennes.)	Belfort	France	Lac de Malsaucy	COVID-19 pandemic	
July 5, 2020	Rome	Italy	Parco della Musica	COVID-19 pandemic	
July 6, 2020	Turin	Italy	Officine Grandi Riparazioni	COVID-19 pandemic	
July 9, 2020 (Note: The concert on July 9, 2020 is part of NOS Alive.)	Lisbon	Portugal	Passeio Marítimo de Algés	COVID-19 pandemic	
July 10, 2020 (Note: The concert on July 10, 2020 is part of Cap Roig Festival.)	Calella de Palafrugell	Spain	Gardens of Cap Roig	COVID-19 pandemic	
July 12, 2020	Verona	Italy	Arena di Verona	COVID-19 pandemic	
July 15, 2020 (Note: The concert on July 15, 2020 is part of Castle Clam Festival.)	Klam	Austria	Burg Clam	COVID-19 pandemic	
July 18, 2020 (Note: The concert on July 18, 2020 is part of Latitude Festival.)	Southwold	England	Henham Park	COVID-19 pandemic	
July 19, 2020 (Note: The concert on July 19, 2020 is part of Festival Internacional de Benicàssim.)	Benicàssim	Spain	Dolni Vitkovice	COVID-19 pandemic	
August 12, 2020	West Valley City	United States	Maverik Center	COVID-19 pandemic	
August 14, 2020	Portland	United States	Moda Center	COVID-19 pandemic	
August 15, 2020	George	United States	The Gorge Amphitheatre	COVID-19 pandemic	
August 18, 2020	San Francisco	United States	Chase Center	COVID-19 pandemic	
August 21, 2020	Los Angeles	United States	Staples Center	COVID-19 pandemic	
August 25, 2020	San Diego	United States	Pechanga Arena	COVID-19 pandemic	
August 26, 2020	Glendale	United States	Gila River Arena	COVID-19 pandemic	
August 29, 2020	Denver	United States	Coors Field	COVID-19 pandemic	
September 2, 2020	Calgary	Canada	Scotiabank Saddledome	COVID-19 pandemic	
September 4, 2020	Edmonton	Canada	Rogers Place	COVID-19 pandemic	
September 8, 2020	Vancouver	Canada	Rogers Arena	COVID-19 pandemic	
September 11, 2020	Saskatoon	Canada	SaskTel Centre	COVID-19 pandemic	
September 12, 2020	Winnipeg	Canada	Bell MTS Place	COVID-19 pandemic	
September 15, 2020	Kansas City	United States	Sprint Center	COVID-19 pandemic	
September 18, 2020	Austin	United States	Frank Erwin Center	COVID-19 pandemic	
September 22, 2020 (Note: The concert on September 22, 2020, at the CHI Health Center Omaha in Omaha was originally scheduled to take place on March 14, 2020, but was postponed due to the ongoing coronavirus pandemic.)	Omaha	United States	CHI Health Center Omaha	COVID-19 pandemic	
September 24, 2020 (Note: The concert on September 24, 2020, at the Xcel Energy Center in Saint Paul was originally scheduled to take place on March 13, 2020, but was postponed due to the ongoing coronavirus pandemic.)	Saint Paul	United States	Xcel Energy Center	COVID-19 pandemic	
October 17, 2020 (Note: The concert on October 17, 2020 is part of Beale Street Music Festival. The festival was originally scheduled to take place on May 2, 2020, but was postponed due to the ongoing coronavirus pandemic.)	Memphis	United States	Tom Lee Park	COVID-19 pandemic	
December 8, 2020 (Note: The concert on December 8, 2020, at Domos Art in Lima was originally scheduled to take place on April 7, 2020, but was postponed due to the ongoing coronavirus pandemic.)	Lima	Peru	Domos Art	COVID-19 pandemic	
June 18, 2021 (Note: The concert on June 19, 2020 was supposed to be part of Hurricane Festival.)	Scheeßel	Germany	Eichenring	COVID-19 pandemic	
June 19, 2021 (Note: The concert on June 20, 2020 was supposed to be part of Southside Festival.)	Neuhausen ob Eck	Germany	Neuhausen ob Eck Airfield	COVID-19 pandemic	
June 21, 2021 (Note: The concert on June 22, 2020 was supposed to be part of INmusic Festival.) or TBA	Zagreb	Croatia	Lake Jarun	COVID-19 pandemic	
June 22, 2021	Bratislava	Slovakia	AXA Aréna NTC	COVID-19 pandemic	
June 24, 2021 (Note: The concert on June 25, 2020 was supposed to be part of Garorock Festival.)	Marmande	France	Plaine de la Filhole	COVID-19 pandemic	
June 29, 2021	Luxembourg City	Luxembourg	Neumünster Abbey	COVID-19 pandemic	
July 1, 2021 (Note: The concert on July 2, 2020 is part of Rock Werchter.)	Werchter	Belgium	Werchter Festivalpark	COVID-19 pandemic	
July 3, 2021 (Note: The concert on June 27, 2020 was supposed to be part of Open Air St. Gallen.)	St. Gallen	Switzerland	Sittertobel	COVID-19 pandemic	
July 5, 2021	Rome	Italy	Parco della Musica	COVID-19 pandemic	
July 6, 2021	Turin	Italy	Officine Grandi Riparazioni	COVID-19 pandemic	
July 8, 2021 (Note: The concert on July 9, 2020 is part of NOS Alive.)	Lisbon	Portugal	Passeio Marítimo de Algés	COVID-19 pandemic	
July 11, 2021	Verona	Italy	Arena di Verona	COVID-19 pandemic	
July 14, 2021 (Note: The concert on July 15, 2020 is part of Castle Clam Festival.)	Klam	Austria	Burg Clam	COVID-19 pandemic	
July 15, 2021 (Note: The concert on July 17, 2020 is part of Colours of Ostrava.)	Ostrava	Czech Republic	Dolni Vitkovice	COVID-19 pandemic	
