= Abi (singer) =

American singer-songwriter (born 1997)

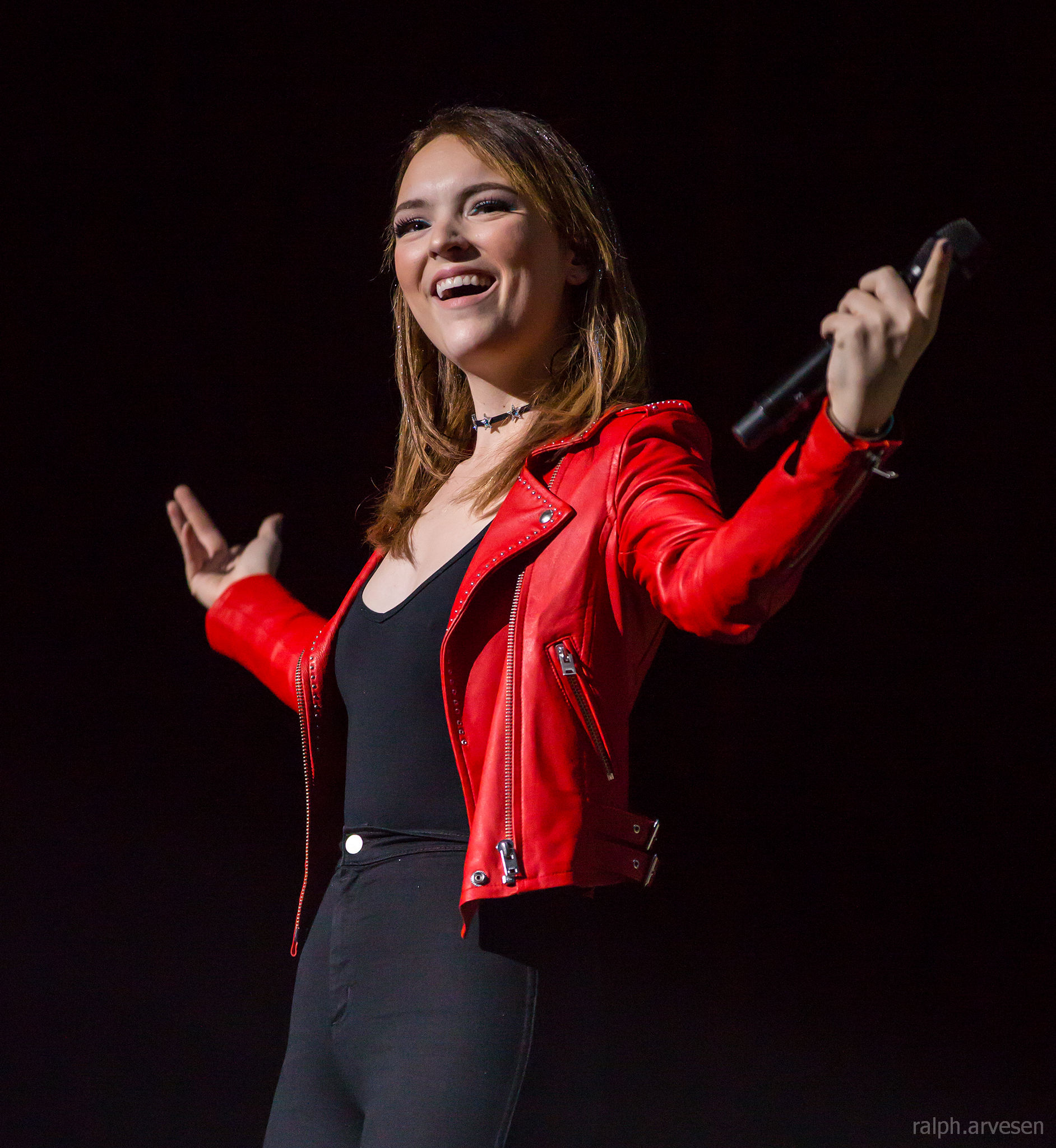
- Abi in 2016

Background information
- Also known as: Abi, Abi Ann
- Born: Abigail Dawn Ann Hoffman; June 26, 1997 (age 29); Midland, Texas
- Genres: Country, pop
- Occupations: Singer, songwriter
- Label: One Country Records
- Website: https://www.abimusicofficial.com/
- Digital Publicist - Anthony Langone at Marbaloo

Abigail Dawn Ann Hoffman (born June 26, 1997), also known as Abi or Abi Ann, is an American singer and songwriter signed to One Country Records.

== Early life and education ==
Abigail Dawn Ann Hoffman was born on June 26, 1997 in Midland, TX, she moved to Nashville to pursue a Business Entrepreneurship degree at Belmont University and a career in music.

== Career ==
Abi released the Day Dreaming EP in 2013 then with the stage name of "Abi Ann", which included four versions of the song. Until her full EP 17 was released in 2015, she released singles like "Too Far Gone," "One Last Tear" and "Just To Say We Tried" (all in 2014), "Silence" and the holiday song, "Santa, Can You Hear Me" (both in 2012). 17 includes her songs, "Future Ex-Boyfriend," "Cage Without A Key," "Truck Candy," "Your Side of Town" and "It's The Bones". Since she has released two other singles "Put A Bow On It" (2016) and her most recent single "Matches" (2017).

In 2014, Abi toured with Jesse McCartney along the West Coast including the House of Blues in Los Angeles, California. She went on her first national tour, the Piece by Piece Tour with Kelly Clarkson, Eric Hutchison and Pentatonix in 2015. The tour hit 36 cities in the US and Canada. And in the fall of 2016, she went on tour with Pentatonix and Us The Duo on the Pentatonix World Tour. She has also toured with Eli Young Band, Frankie Ballard, performed at Nascar events across the country, and opened for Sam Hunt, Phil Vassar, Mo Pitney, and others at the 30th Annual Country Fest in Cadott, WI.

The Independent Music Network named Abi "America's Favorite Teen Country Artist" in 2012. The following year, she headlined the Commemorative Air Force (CAF) Airshow in Midland, Texas.

Abi received 14 nominations and won 5 titles at the 2013 Indie Music Channel Awards.

In 2017, Abi's single ‘Matches’ quickly caught fire scoring her a spot on CMT’s Artist Discovery Program, earned her 8+ weeks of airplay on CMT music, and generated over 150,000 views on Vevo.

In May 2018, Abi premiered her new single, "A Day Without" with Taste of Country. The catchy yet heartfelt song was co-written by Andrew Dorff, Jimmy Robbins and Lucie Silvas and was immediately named one of Rolling Stone Country's "10 Best Country Songs of the Week." "A Day Without" has generated over 75,000 streams on Apple Music as of August 2018. On July 30, 2018, "A Day Without" debuted at number 59 on the Billboard Country Music Indicator chart. The song was only one of three new songs debuted on the chart that week. The others included Brett Eldredge's "Love Someone" and Blake Shelton's "Turnin' Me On."

== Filmography ==
According to IMDb

- Naked Innocence (2010)
- Beyond the Mat (2013)
- Someone I Used to Know (2013)
- Wish Wizard (2014)

=== Music ===
- Hello Herman (2012)
- My Dog's Christmas Miracle (2011)
- Diary of an Ex-Child Start (2010)

=== Soundtrack ===
- Cassidy Way: "The Kind of Trouble I Like" (2016)

=== Production ===
- The Killers in Connecticut: Associate Producer (2012)

== Discography ==
- "Silence" (2012)
- "Santa Can You Hear Me" (2012)
- DayDreaming (2013)
- "One Last Tear "(2014)
- "Too Far Gone" (2014)
- "Just Say We Tried" (2014)
- EP: 17 (Released in 2015)
  - "Future Ex Boyfriend"
  - "Cage Without a Key"
  - "It's the Bones"
  - "Your Side of Town"
  - "Truck Candy"
- "Put a Bow on It "(2016)
- "Matches" (2017)
- "A Day Without" (2018)
