= Predators Holdings LLC =

Owners of the Nashville Predators

- Type: Private
- Industry: Professional sports, property management, entertainment
- Founded: 2007
- Headquarters: Nashville, Tennessee, United States
- Area served: Nashville
- Key people: Bill Haslam, Chairman; David Freeman, Founder
- Products: Professional sports teams, sports venues
- Owner: Joel Dobberpuhl, Holly Dobberpuhl, Brent Jacobs, Joey Jacobs, Scott Jacobs, DeWitt Thompson IV, Dewitt Thompson V, John Thompson, David Freeman, Warren Woo and W. Brett Wilson
- Subsidiaries: Nashville Predators; Bridgestone Arena

Predators Holdings LLC is a private company that owns and operates the Nashville Predators of the National Hockey League. The company also owns Powers Management, which manages the day-to-day operations of Bridgestone Arena. The company consists of local businessmen in a variety of areas.

Predators Holdings, LLC bought the Nashville Predators on December 7, 2007, from Craig Leipold for $193 million, who would buy the Minnesota Wild in 2008.
