= Bridgestone Arena =

Multi-purpose indoor arena in Nashville, Tennessee, U.S.

- Smashville

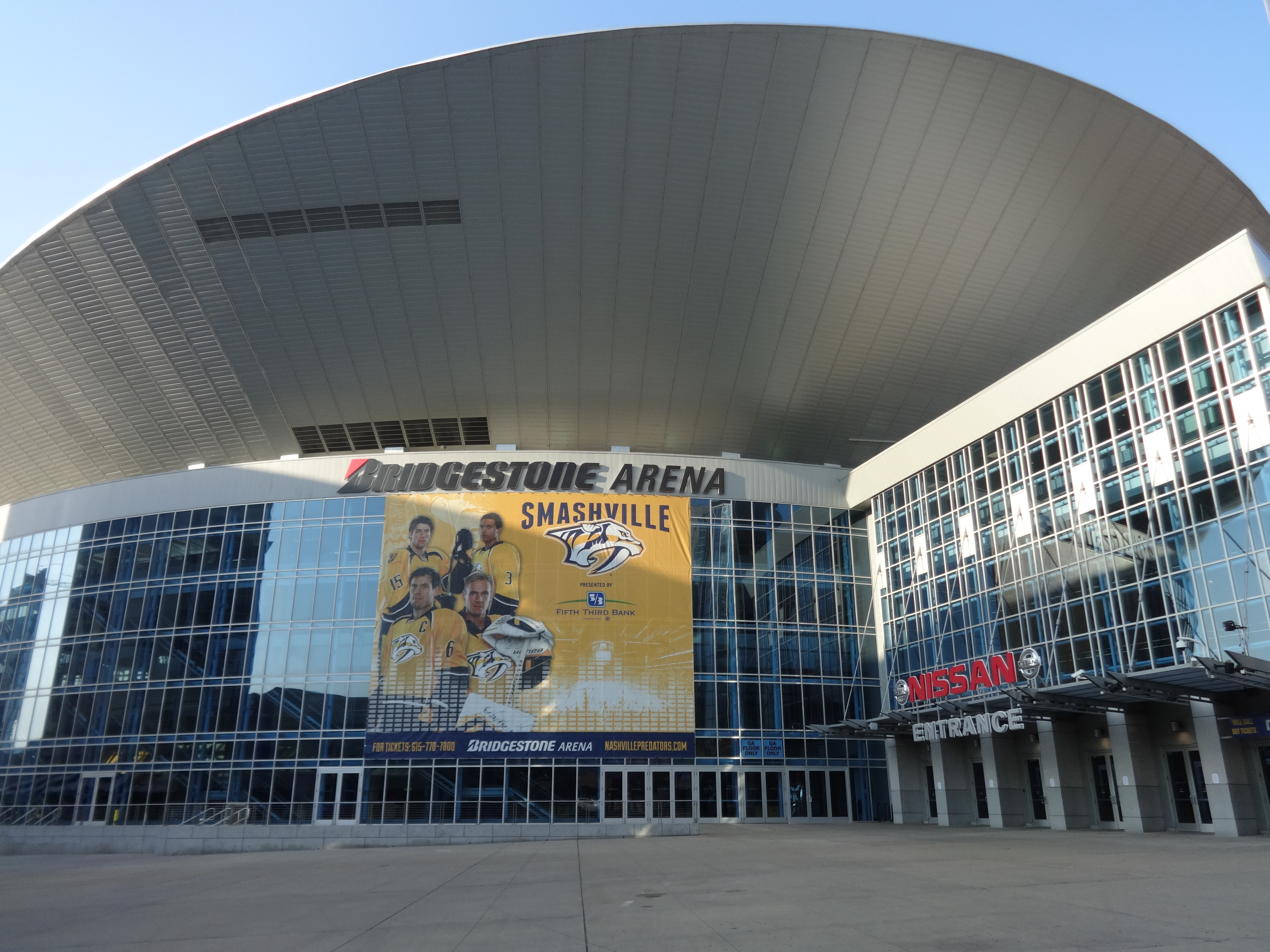
- Bridgestone Arena in 2015

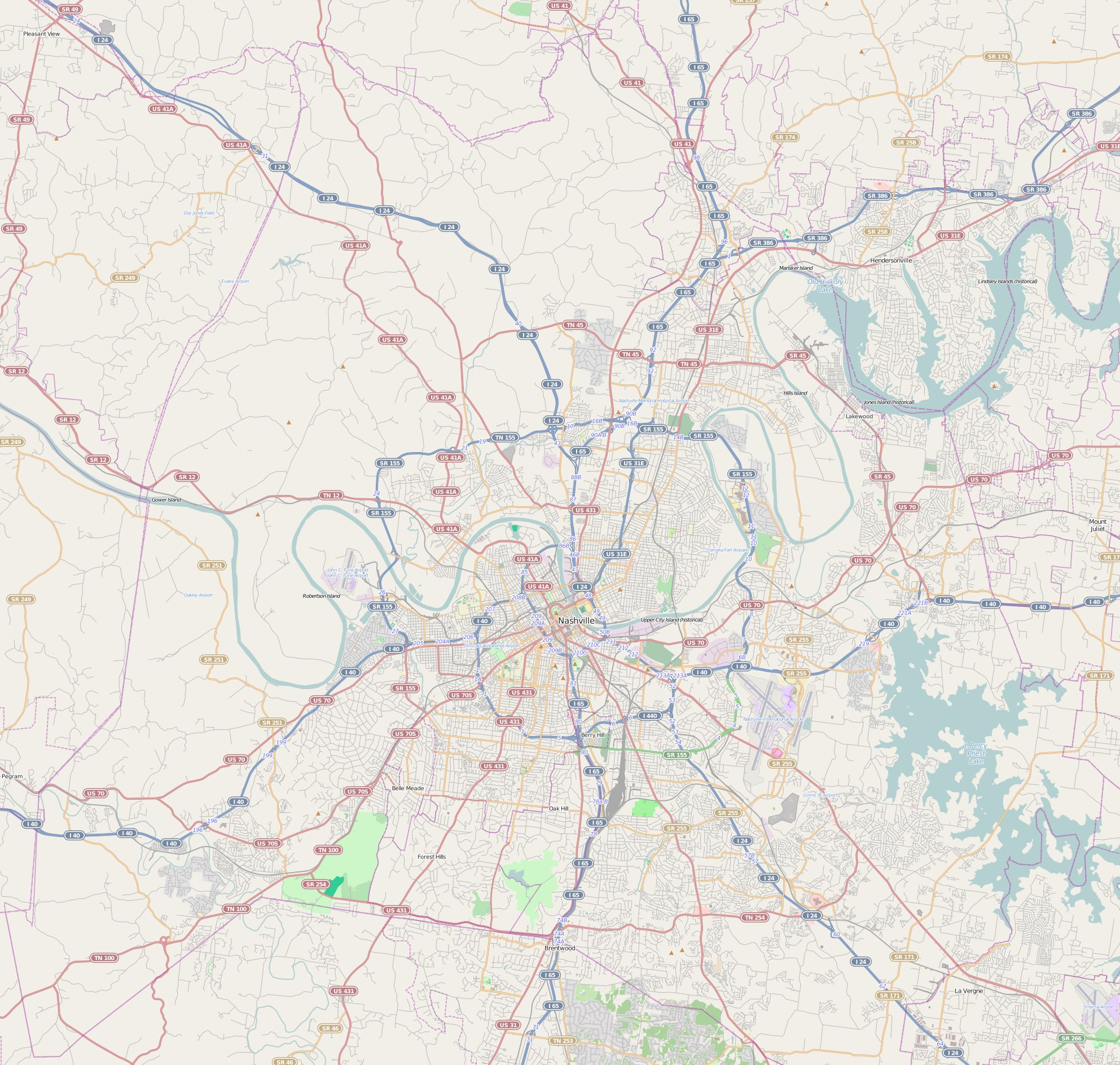
- Location in Nashville Location in Tennessee Location in the United States
- Former names: Nashville Arena (1996–99, 2007, 2009−10); Gaylord Entertainment Center (1999–2007); Sommet Center (May 2007–November 2009)
- Address: 501 Broadway
- Location: Nashville, Tennessee, U.S.
- Coordinates: 36°9′33″N 86°46′43″W
- Owner: Sports Authority of Nashville; Davidson County
- Operator: Powers Management Company
- Capacity: Basketball: 18,500; Concerts: 10,000–20,000; Ice hockey: 17,159; Theater: 5,145
- Surface: Multi-surface
- Record attendance: 19,365 (April 15, 2023; Nate Bargatze)
- Field size: 750,000 sq ft (70,000 m^{2})

Construction
- Groundbreaking: January 20, 1994
- Opened: December 18, 1996
- Renovated: 2007, 2011, 2015
- Cost: $144 million ($313 million in 2025 dollars)
- Architects: HOK Sport; Hart Freeland Roberts, Inc.
- Project manager: Brookwood Group
- Structural engineer: Thornton Tomasetti
- Services engineer: Smith Seckman Reid Inc.
- General contractor: Turner/Perini

Tenants
- Nashville Predators (NHL) 1998–present Nashville Kats (AFL) 1997–2001, 2005–2007; Nashville Stampede (PBR) 2022–present

Website
- bridgestonearena.com

Bridgestone Arena (originally Nashville Arena, and formerly Gaylord Entertainment Center and Sommet Center) is a multi-purpose indoor arena in downtown Nashville, Tennessee, United States. Completed in 1996, it is the home of the Nashville Predators of the National Hockey League.

== Ownership ==
Designed by HOK Sport (now Populous) in conjunction with the Nashville-based architecture/engineering firm Hart Freeland Roberts, INC., it was designed at an angle on the corner of Broadway and 5th Avenue in Nashville in physical homage to the historic Ryman Auditorium, the original home of the Grand Ole Opry.

Bridgestone Arena is owned by the Sports Authority of Nashville and Davidson County and operated by Powers Management Company, a subsidiary of the Nashville Predators National Hockey League franchise, which has been its primary tenant since 1998.

== Events ==
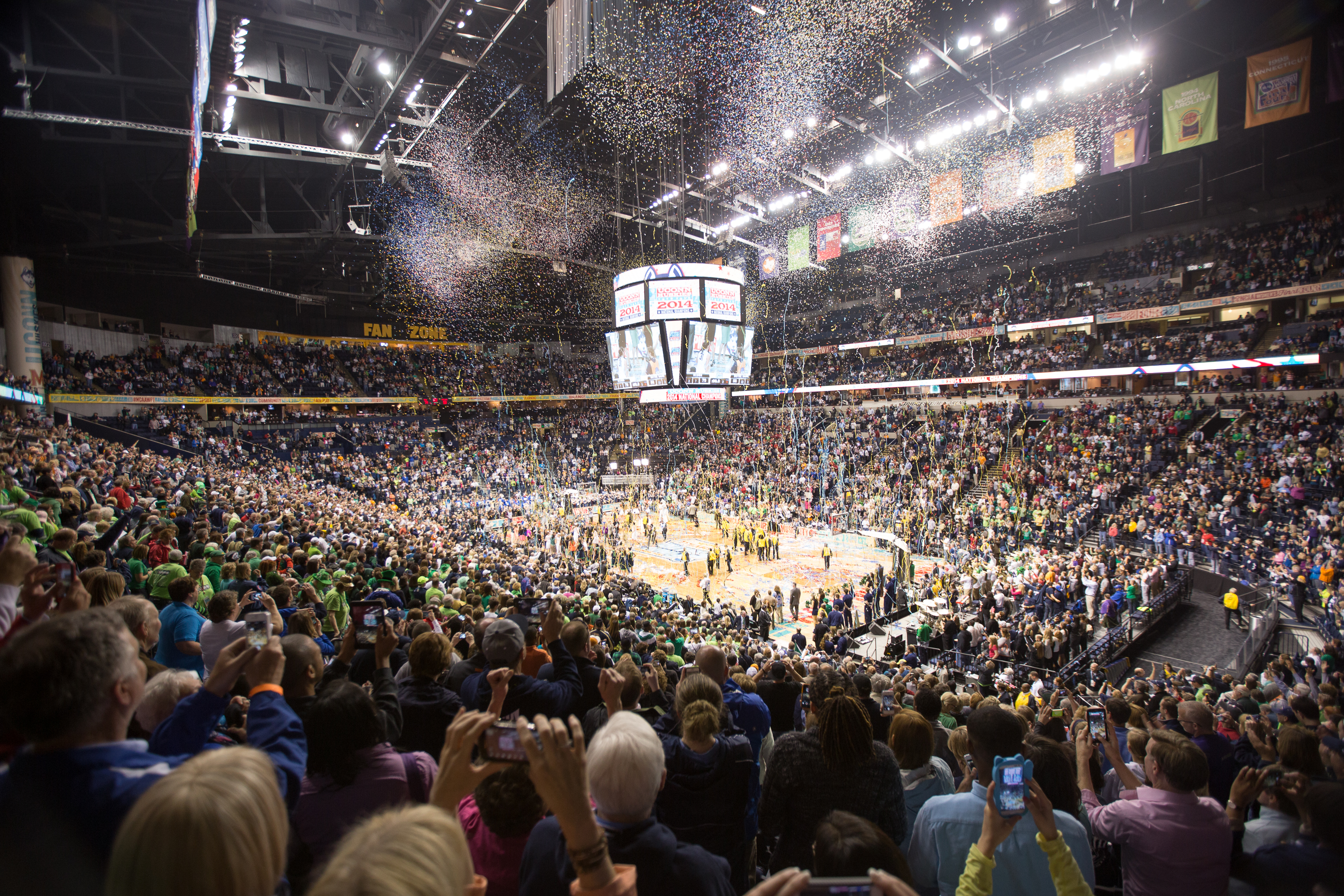
2014 NCAA Women's Final Four (won by Connecticut Huskies)

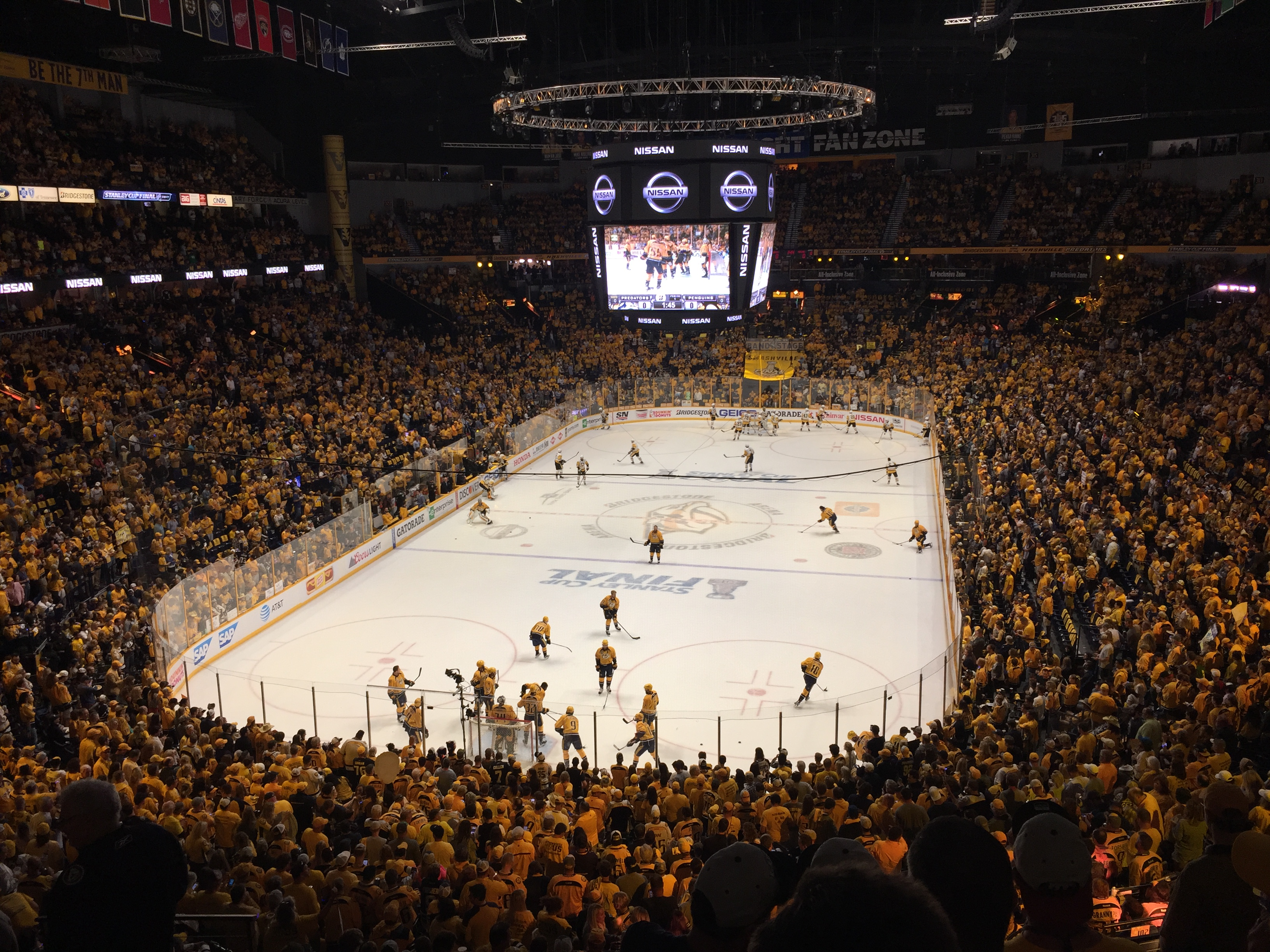
Bridgestone Arena, game 6 of the 2017 Stanley Cup Finals

The Predators hosted the NHL entry draft here in 2003 and 2023; it was also the location for the 2016 NHL All-Star Game.

In 1997, it was the venue of the United States Figure Skating Championships, and in 2004 hosted the USA Gymnastics National Championships. It was the home of the Nashville Kats franchise of the Arena Football League from 1997 until 2001, and hosted the team's revival from 2005 to 2007, when the Kats franchise folded.

The arena has hosted college basketball events, including both men's (2001, 2006, 2010) and women's tournaments of the Southeastern Conference and the Ohio Valley Conference. Nashville will serve as a primary venue for the SEC men's basketball tournament nine times between 2015 and 2025 (2015–2017, 2019–2021, and 2023–2025) after the SEC signed a long-term agreement with the Nashville Sports Council in 2013. It hosted the 2014 NCAA Women's Final Four, the 2018 SEC women's basketball tournament and will host again in 2022 and 2026.

In odd-numbered years, the arena was regularly one of eight sites to host the first and second rounds of the men's NCAA Basketball Tournament for the first ten years of its existence, though it was taken out of the rotation for several years, partly due to the obsolete octagonal mid-1990s-style scoreboard that hung above the arena floor. It was replaced in the summer of 2007 by a new $5 million scoreboard and digital control room. The NCAA Tournament returned to Nashville in 2012.

Beginning in 2002, the arena hosted a Professional Bull Riders (PBR) Premier Series event every year (except in 2005 and 2006) through 2019 and again in 2021. The event moved to the Arena in 2002 after having previously occupied the Municipal Auditorium from 1993 through 2001. Since 2022, Bridgestone Arena is the home venue of the Nashville Stampede; one of ten bull riding teams of the PBR Team Series held during the summer and autumn in the United States.

The venue has also hosted numerous concerts and religious gatherings. Beginning in 2006, the Country Music Association Awards have been held in the arena, after the awards show moved from the Grand Ole Opry House with a one-year stop in New York City at Madison Square Garden in 2005.

The arena has held a list of UFC events, beginning with UFC Fight Night: Condit vs. Kampmann on April 1, 2009. The UFC returned to the venue on January 20, 2012 for UFC on FX: Guillard vs. Miller. On August 8, 2015, the arena held UFC Fight Night: Teixeira vs. Saint Preux. Two years later, the venue hosted UFC Fight Night: Swanson vs. Lobov on April 22, 2017. The arena hosted UFC Fight Night: Thompson vs. Pettis on March 23, 2019. The UFC returned to the arena five years later for UFC on ESPN: Sandhagen vs. Font on August 5, 2023. The venue most recently hosted UFC on ESPN: Lewis vs. Teixeira on July 12, 2025.

Due to the 2012–13 NHL lockout, the Predators did not host any games that season until January 19, 2013. Instead, the arena hosted a Southern Professional Hockey League preseason game between the only other Tennessee pro hockey franchise, the Knoxville Ice Bears, and their cross-border rivals Huntsville Havoc on October 20.

Every late May since 2025, Bridgestone Arena has hosted the Music City Rodeo, Nashville's own annual rodeo sanctioned by the Professional Rodeo Cowboys Association (PRCA). The three-day event consists of a daily rodeo performance followed by a concert by a famous country music artist.

The Professional Women's Hockey League (PWHL) played its first game in Nashville and at Bridgestone Arena on January 16, 2027 between the Seattle Torrent and Vegas Vanguards.

== Arena information ==
Bridgestone Arena has a seating capacity of 17,159 for ice hockey, 19,395 for basketball, 10,000 for half-house concerts, 18,500 for end-stage concerts and 20,000 for center-stage concerts, depending on the configuration used. It has also hosted several professional wrestling events and a boxing card since its opening.

The seating configuration is notable for the oddly-shaped south end, which features two large round roof support columns, no mid-level seating, and only one level of suites, bringing the upper-level seats much closer to the floor.

The arena can be converted into the 5,145-seat Music City Theater, used for theater concerts and Broadway and family shows, by placing a stage at the north end of the arena floor and hanging a curtain behind the stage and another to conceal the upper deck. The arena also features 43,000 square feet (4,000 m^{2}) of space in a trade show layout.

Nate Bargatze set the attendance record on April 15, 2023, with 19,365 fans in attendance. The previous record (19,292) had been set six weeks earlier by Morgan Wallen. Kacey Musgraves set the record for the highest attendance for a headlining woman, with 18,373 fans during the Oh, What a World: Tour.

== Notable events ==
Besides hosting the Nashville Predators, because of its location near Music Row and Nashville's role as the center of country music, Bridgestone Arena has seen many other famous performers and events:

- CMT Music Awards (annually 2000–2005; 2009–2016; 2018–2019; 2021)
- 2002 WWE Judgment Day PPV May 19, 2002
- WWE Smackville PPV July 27, 2019
- 2003 NHL entry draft June 21, 2003
- North American Youth Congress August 5–7, 2009
- CMA Awards (annually 2006–present, except in 2020 which was held in the nearby Music City Center as it followed the restrictions due to the COVID-19 pandemic)
- 61st National Hockey League All-Star Game January 31, 2016
- 2017 Stanley Cup Finals Game 3, 4, and 6; June 2017

=== Concerts (not complete list) ===
Date	Artist	Tour / Concert Name	Opening Act
September 4, 1997	Mary J. Blige	Share My World Tour	Usher
April 12, 2000	Bruce Springsteen & The E Street Band	Bruce Springsteen and the E Street Band Reunion Tour	
August 5, 2004	Hilary Duff	Most Wanted Tour	Haylie Duff
November 11, 2004	Metallica	Madly in Anger with the World Tour	Godsmack
June 12, 2005	Destiny's Child	Destiny Fulfilled... and Lovin' It	
January 17, 2007	Red Hot Chili Peppers	Stadium Arcadium World Tour	Gnarls Barkley
March 18, 2007	Justin Timberlake	FutureSex/LoveShow	
July 18, 2007	Beyoncé	The Beyoncé Experience	
November 23, 2007	Miley Cyrus	Best of Both Worlds Tour	Jonas Brothers
February 28, 2008	Linkin Park	Minutes to Midnight World Tour	
February 29, 2008	Kid Rock	Rock N' Roll Revival Tour	Rev Run
August 21, 2008	Bruce Springsteen & The E Street Band	Magic Tour	
July 31, 2009	Green Day	21st Century Breakdown	Kaiser Chiefs
September 12, 2009	Taylor Swift	Fearless Tour	Gloriana; Kellie Pickler
October 28, 2009	Kiss	Alive 35 World Tour	Buckcherry
November 18, 2009	Bruce Springsteen & The E Street Band	Working on a Dream Tour	
November 25, 2009	Miley Cyrus	Wonder World Tour	Metro Station
April 21, 2010	Bon Jovi	The Circle Tour	Dashboard Confessional
August 11, 2010	Justin Bieber	My World Tour	
December 5, 2010	Michael Bublé	Crazy Love Tour	Naturally 7
February 18, 2011	Kid Rock	Born Free Tour	Jamey Johnson, Ty Stone, Sheryl Crow
April 3, 2011	Rush	Time Machine Tour	
August 17, 2011	Maroon 5 Train	2011 Summer Tour	PJ Morton
June 21, 2011	New Kids on the Block Backstreet Boys	NKOTBSB Tour	Jordin Sparks; Ashlyne Huff
July 3, 2011	Mötley Crüe	Glam-A-Geddon	Poison New York Dolls
July 18, 2011	Britney Spears	Femme Fatale Tour	Nicki Minaj; Jessie and the Toy Boys; NERVO
August 19, 2011	Katy Perry	California Dreams Tour	Janelle Monáe; DJ Skeet Skeet
September 16, 2011	Taylor Swift	Speak Now World Tour	Needtobreathe; Charlie Worsham
September 17, 2011	Taylor Swift	Speak Now World Tour	Needtobreathe; Charlie Worsham
February 17, 2012	Drake	Club Paradise Tour	Kendrick Lamar; A$AP Rocky
February 24, 2012	Journey	Eclipse Tour	
March 7, 2012	Big Time Rush	Better with U Tour	
April 27, 2012	Van Halen	A Different Kind of Truth Tour	
September 23, 2012	Carrie Underwood	Blown Away Tour	Hunter Hayes
December 13, 2012	Aerosmith	Global Warming Tour	
January 18, 2013	Justin Bieber	Believe Tour	Carly Rae Jepsen; Cody Simpson
February 15, 2013	Kid Rock	Rebel Soul Tour	Buckcherry
March 2, 2013	P!nk	The Truth About Love Tour	The Hives
March 6, 2013	Bon Jovi	Because We Can	
March 24, 2013	Maroon 5	Overexposed Tour	
April 27, 2013	Jimmy Buffett & Coral Reefer Band	Songs from St. Somewhere Tour	
June 18, 2013	New Kids on the Block, 98 Degrees & Boyz II Men	The Package Tour	
June 19, 2013	One Direction	Take Me Home Tour	5 Seconds of Summer
July 13, 2013	Beyoncé	The Mrs. Carter Show World Tour	Luke James
September 6, 2013	Muse	The 2nd Law World Tour	Cage the Elephant
September 19, 2013	Taylor Swift	The Red Tour	Ed Sheeran; Casey James
September 20, 2013	Taylor Swift	The Red Tour	Ed Sheeran; Casey James
September 21, 2013	Taylor Swift	The Red Tour	Ed Sheeran; Casey James
October 16, 2013	Eagles	History of the Eagles – Live in Concert	
October 23, 2013	Michael Bublé	To Be Loved Tour	Naturally 7
October 25, 2013	Selena Gomez	Stars Dance Tour	Emblem3; Christina Grimmie
November 15, 2013	Justin Timberlake	The 20/20 Experience World Tour	The Weeknd
November 26, 2013	Paramore	The Self-Titled Tour	Hellogoodbye; Metric
November 27, 2013	Kanye West	The Yeezus Tour	Kendrick Lamar
February 1, 2014	Keith Urban	Light the Fuse Tour	
February 7, 2014	Kings of Leon	Mechanical Bull Tour	Gary Clark, Jr.
February 22, 2014	Brad Paisley	Beat This Summer Tour	
March 14, 2014	Billy Joel	Billy Joel in Concert	
March 29, 2014	Demi Lovato	The Neon Lights Tour	Fifth Harmony; Cher Lloyd; Collins Key
April 17, 2014	Bruce Springsteen & The E Street Band	High Hopes Tour	
June 27, 2014	Katy Perry	Prismatic World Tour	Capital Cities; Ferras
August 7, 2014	Miley Cyrus	Bangerz Tour	Lily Allen
October 26, 2014	Paul McCartney	Out There	
December 19, 2014	Justin Timberlake	The 20/20 Experience World Tour	DJ Freestyle Steve
January 17, 2015	Linkin Park	The Hunting Party Tour	Of Mice & Men; Rise Against
February 21, 2015	Jason Aldean	Burn It Down Tour	Tyler Farr; Cole Swindell
February 27, 2015	Maroon 5	Maroon V Tour	Magic! Rozzi Crane
March 26, 2015	Kenny Chesney	The Big Revival Tour	Jake Owen; Chase Rice
March 27, 2015	Kenny Chesney	The Big Revival Tour	Jake Owen; Chase Rice
May 1, 2015	Zac Brown Band	Jekyll and Hyde Tour	
May 11, 2015	The Who	The Who Hits 50!	
May 27, 2015	New Kids on the Block	The Main Event	
July 8, 2015	Imagine Dragons	Smoke + Mirrors Tour	Metric; Halsey
July 12, 2015	Fall Out Boy & Wiz Khalifa	The Boys of Zummer	Hoodie Allen
July 31, 2015	Shania Twain	Rock This Country Tour	Gavin DeGraw
September 5, 2015	Kelly Clarkson	Piece by Piece Tour	Pentatonix; Eric Hutchinson; Abi Ann
September 11, 2015	Lady Antebellum	Wheels Up Tour	Hunter Hayes; Sam Hunt
September 13, 2015	Ed Sheeran	x Tour	
September 22, 2015	Ariana Grande	The Honeymoon Tour	Prince Royce; Who Is Fancy
September 25, 2015	Taylor Swift	The 1989 World Tour	Vance Joy; Haim
September 26, 2015	Taylor Swift	The 1989 World Tour	Vance Joy; Haim
January 18, 2016	Madonna	Rebel Heart Tour	Mary Mac
March 18, 2016	Rihanna	Anti World Tour	Travis Scott
June 21, 2016	Selena Gomez	Revival Tour	DNCE; Bahari
June 27, 2016	Justin Bieber	Purpose World Tour	Post Malone; Moxie Raia
July 23, 2016	5 Seconds of Summer	Sounds Live Feels Live World Tour	One Ok Rock; Hey Violet
August 14, 2016	Drake & Future	Summer Sixteen Tour	Roy Woods; Dvsn
August 17, 2016	Dixie Chicks	DCX MMXVI World Tour	Vintage Trouble; Smooth Hound Smith
September 7, 2016	Demi Lovato & Nick Jonas	Future Now Tour	Mike Posner; Chord Overstreet
September 22, 2016	Carrie Underwood	Storyteller Tour: Stories in the Round	Easton Corbin; The Swon Brothers
September 24, 2016	Kanye West	Saint Pablo Tour	
October 13, 2016	Florida Georgia Line	Dig Your Roots Tour	Cole Swindell; The Cadillac Three; Kane Brown; Chris Lane
October 15, 2016	Adele	Adele Live 2016	N/A
October 16, 2016	Adele	Adele Live 2016	N/A
November 7, 2016	Stevie Nicks	24 Karat Gold Tour	The Pretenders
February 14, 2017	Ariana Grande	Dangerous Woman Tour	Victoria Monét; Little Mix
February 18, 2017	Bon Jovi	This House Is Not for Sale Tour	Jake Johnson
April 19, 2017	Neil Diamond	50 Year Anniversary World Tour (Neil Diamond)	
May 17, 2017	New Kids on the Block, Boyz II Men, & Paula Abdul	Total Package Tour	
May 26, 2017	Eric Church	Holdin' My Own Tour	
May 27, 2017	Eric Church	Holdin' My Own Tour	
July 31, 2017	Shawn Mendes	Illuminate World Tour	Charlie Puth
August 4, 2017	Tim McGraw & Faith Hill	Soul2Soul: The World Tour	Andra Day
August 5, 2017	Tim McGraw & Faith Hill	Soul2Soul: The World Tour	Andra Day
August 30, 2017	Kendrick Lamar	The Damn Tour	YG; DRAM
September 9, 2017	Lady Antebellum	You Look Good World Tour	Kelsea Ballerini; Brett Young; Lindsay Ell
October 6, 2017	Ed Sheeran	÷ Tour	James Blunt
October 7, 2017	Ed Sheeran	÷ Tour	James Blunt
October 18, 2017	Katy Perry	Witness: The Tour	Noah Cyrus
October 29, 2017	The Weeknd	Starboy: Legend of the Fall Tour	Gucci Mane; Nav
November 13, 2017	Guns N' Roses	Not in This Lifetime... Tour	
November 15, 2017	Jay-Z	4:44 Tour	Vic Mensa
December 7, 2017	Janet Jackson	State of the World Tour	
January 19, 2018	Kid Rock	American Rock n Roll Tour	Sweet Tea Trio, A Thousand Horses
February 6, 2018	Lana Del Rey	LA to the Moon Tour	Kali Uchis
March 28, 2018	Demi Lovato	Tell Me You Love Me World Tour	DJ Khaled; Kehlani
April 15, 2018	Lorde	Melodrama World Tour	Run the Jewels; Mitski
May 4, 2018	Foo Fighters	Concrete and Gold Tour	The Struts
May 9, 2018	Justin Timberlake	The Man of the Woods Tour	The Shadowboxers
May 26, 2018	U2	Experience + Innocence Tour	
June 12, 2018	Harry Styles	Harry Styles: Live on Tour	Kacey Musgraves
July 7, 2018	Sam Smith	The Thrill of It All Tour	
July 10, 2018	Imagine Dragons	Evolve World Tour	Grace VanderWaal
July 13, 2018	Kesha & Macklemore	The Adventures of Kesha and Macklemore	Wes Period
July 21, 2018	Shania Twain	Now Tour	Bastian Baker
September 11, 2018	Fall Out Boy	Mania Tour	Machine Gun Kelly; Gym Class Heroes
September 17, 2018	J. Cole	KOD Tour	Young Thug; Jaden Smith; EarthGang
September 18, 2018	Drake & Migos	Aubrey & the Three Migos Tour	Roy Woods
September 23, 2018	Maroon 5	Red Pill Blues Tour	Julia Michaels
October 2, 2018	Florence and the Machine	High as Hope Tour	Billie Eilish
October 7, 2018	Bruno Mars	24K Magic World Tour	Ella Mai; DJ Rashida
October 8, 2018	Bruno Mars	24K Magic World Tour	Ella Mai; DJ Rashida
October 16, 2018	Twenty One Pilots	The Bandito Tour	Awolnation; Max Frost
October 24, 2018	Elton John	Farewell Yellow Brick Road	
October 26, 2018	Lynyrd Skynyrd	The Last of the Street Survivors Farewell Tour	
December 2, 2018	Childish Gambino	This Is America Tour	Vince Staples
January 11, 2019	Bob Seger	Roll Me Away: The Final Tour	Larkin Poe
January 24, 2019	Metallica	WorldWired Tour	Jim Breuer
January 25, 2019	Panic! at the Disco	Pray for the Wicked Tour	Two Feet; Betty Who
February 27, 2019	Fleetwood Mac	An Evening with Fleetwood Mac	
March 10, 2019	P!nk	Beautiful Trauma World Tour	Julia Michaels; KidCutUp
March 20, 2019	Travis Scott	Astroworld – Wish You Were Here Tour	Sheck Wes
March 22, 2019	Mumford & Sons	Delta Tour	Cat Power
March 28, 2019	Zac Brown Band	Down the Rabbit Hole Live	Moon Taxi
March 29, 2019	Kelly Clarkson	Meaning of Life Tour	Kelsea Ballerini; Brynn Cartelli
April 9, 2019	Kiss	End of the Road World Tour	
May 16, 2019	The Who	Moving On! Tour	Lukas Nelson & Promise of the Real
June 7, 2019	Ariana Grande	Sweetener World Tour	Normani; Social House
June 20, 2019	Pentatonix	Pentatonix: The World Tour	Rachel Platten; Citizen Queen
June 21, 2019	JoJo Siwa	D.R.E.A.M. The Tour	
July 19, 2019	Michael Bublé	An Evening with Michael Bublé	
August 2, 2019	Shawn Mendes	Shawn Mendes: The Tour	Alessia Cara
August 15, 2019	Queen & Adam Lambert	The Rhapsody Tour	
August 19, 2019	Iron Maiden	Legacy of the Beast World Tour	The Raven Age
August 26, 2019	Backstreet Boys	DNA World Tour	
September 10, 2019	Jonas Brothers	Happiness Begins Tour	Bebe Rexha; Jordan McGraw
September 24, 2019	JoJo Siwa	D.R.E.A.M. The Tour	
September 27, 2019	Carrie Underwood	Cry Pretty Tour 360	Maddie & Tae; Runaway June
October 13, 2019	Thomas Rhett	Very Hot Summer Tour	Dustin Lynch; Russell Dickerson; Rhett Akins; Little Big Town; HARDY; Tyler Hubbard
October 20, 2019	The Chainsmokers	World War Joy Tour	
October 25, 2019	Kacey Musgraves	Oh, What a World: Tour II	Maggie Rogers; Yola
December 5, 2019	Ariana Grande	Sweetener World Tour	Social House
January 13, 2020	Celine Dion	Courage World Tour	
February 19, 2020	The Lumineers	III: The World Tour	Mt. Joy; J.S. Ondara
March 4, 2020	Post Malone	Runaway Tour	Swae Lee; Tyla Yaweh
March 6, 2020	Dan + Shay	The (Arena) Tour	The Band Camino; Ingrid Andress
March 7, 2020	Dan + Shay	The (Arena) Tour	The Band Camino; Ingrid Andress
September 29, 2021	Harry Styles	Love On Tour	Jenny Lewis
October 1, 2021	Harry Styles	Love On Tour	Jenny Lewis
October 7, 2021	Pitbull	I Feel Good Tour	Iggy Azalea
October 8, 2021	Alan Jackson	25th Anniversary Keepin' It Country Tour	Jeff Foxworthy; Jon Pardi
February 11, 2022	Kacey Musgraves	Star-crossed: unveiled	King Princess; MUNA
February 14, 2022	Dua Lipa	Future Nostalgia Tour	Caroline Polachek; Lolo Zouaï
March 9, 2022	Billie Eilish	Happier Than Ever, The World Tour	Duckwrth
March 16, 2022	Morgan Wallen	The Dangerous Tour	HARDY; Larry Fleet
March 17, 2022	Morgan Wallen	The Dangerous Tour	HARDY; Larry Fleet
March 18, 2022	Morgan Wallen	The Dangerous Tour	HARDY; Larry Fleet
April 13, 2022	John Mayer	Sob Rock Tour	Yebba
April 28, 2022	Eagles	Hotel California 2020 Tour	
May 18, 2022	Justin Bieber	Justice World Tour	Jaden Smith; Eddie Benjamin; TEO
May 21, 2022	Kid Rock	Bad Reputation Tour	Jason Bonham's Led Zeppelin Evening
July 5, 2022	Rod Stewart	Rod Stewart The Hits	Cheap Trick
July 31, 2022	Kendrick Lamar	The Big Steppers Tour	Baby Keem; Tanna Leone
August 16, 2022	Michael Bublé	Higher Tour	
August 23, 2022	My Chemical Romance	My Chemical Romance Reunion Tour	Dilly Dally; Turnstile
August 27, 2022	Roger Waters	This Is Not a Drill	
September 1, 2022	The Lumineers	Brightside World Tour	James Bay
September 7, 2022	Twenty One Pilots	The Icy Tour	Peter McPoland
September 8, 2022	Backstreet Boys	DNA World Tour	
September 17, 2022	The Killers	Imploding the Mirage Tour	Johnny Marr
September 20, 2022	Slipknot	Knotfest Roadshow Tour	Ice Nine Kills; Crown the Empire
October 7, 2022	Keith Urban	The Speed of Now World Tour	Ingrid Andress
October 8, 2022	Panic! at the Disco	Viva Las Vengeance Tour	MARINA; Jake Wesley Rogers
October 9, 2022	Pitbull	Can't Stop Us Now Tour	Sean Paul
October 10, 2022	The Smashing Pumpkins	Spirits on Fire Tour	Jane's Addiction; Poppy
October 14, 2022	Jason Aldean	Rock N' Roll Cowboy Tour	Gabby Barrett; John Morgan
October 16, 2022	Post Malone	Twelve Carat Tour	Roddy Ricch
October 21, 2022	Reba McEntire	Reba: Live in Concert	Terri Clark
October 23, 2022	Lizzo	The Special Tour	Latto
October 26, 2022	Mary J. Blige	Good Morning Gorgeous Tour	Queen Naija; Ella Mai
December 2, 2022	Maren Morris	Humble Quest Tour	Brittney Spencer; Ruston Kelly
December 9, 2022	Jelly Roll	One Night Only at Bridgestone Arena	
December 14, 2022	Trans-Siberian Orchestra	2022 Winter Tour	
February 17, 2023	Adam Sandler	I Missed You Tour	Kevin James
April 15, 2023	Nate Bargatze	The Be Funny Tour; Billed as "From Old Hickory To Broadway"	Brian Bates; Aaron Weber; Dusty Slay; Stephen Bargatze
February 19, 2023	TobyMac	Hits Deep Tour 2023	Crowder Cochren & Co. Tasha Layton Jon Reddick Terrian
March 1, 2023	Carrie Underwood	Denim & Rhinestones Tour	Jimmie Allen
March 31, 2023	Kane Brown	Drunk Or Dreamin' Tour	Locash, Dustin Lynch
May 4, 2023	Janet Jackson	Together Again	Ludacris
July 1, 2023	Kid Rock	Bad Reputation Tour	Travis Tritt
July 3, 2023	Matchbox Twenty	Slow Dream Tour	Matt Nathanson
July 8, 2023	Kid Rock	Bad Reputation Tour	Travis Tritt
July 16, 2023	blink-182	World Tour 2023/2024	Turnstile KennyHoopla
July 27, 2023	The Chicks	The Chicks Tour	Wild Rivers
July 28, 2023	50 Cent	The Final Lap Tour	Busta Rhymes, Jeremih
October 1, 2023	Drake & 21 Savage	It's All a Blur Tour	Lil Durk
October 2, 2023	Drake & 21 Savage	It's All a Blur Tour	Lil Durk
October 6, 2023	Phish	2023 Fall Tour	
October 7, 2023	Phish	2023 Fall Tour	
October 8, 2023	Phish	2023 Fall Tour	
October 9, 2023	Jonas Brothers	Five Albums. One Night. The World Tour	Lawrence
October 20, 2023	Jonas Brothers	Five Albums. One Night. The World Tour	Lawrence
October 22, 2023	The 1975	Still... At Their Very Best	Dora Jar
October 19, 2023	Depeche Mode	Memento Mori World Tour	DIIV
December 4, 2023	Travis Scott	Circus Maximus Tour	Teezo Touchdown
March 9, 2024	Olivia Rodrigo	Guts World Tour	Chappell Roan
March 24, 2024	Nicki Minaj	Pink Friday 2 World Tour	Monica
March 31, 2024	Fall Out Boy	So Much For (2our) Dust	Jimmy Eat World Hot Mulligan CARR
May 11, 2024	Bad Bunny	Most Wanted Tour	
June 3, 2024	Niall Horan	The Show: Live on Tour	Del Water Gap Ryley Tate Wilson
July 31, 2024	AJR	The Maybe Man Tour	
August 27, 2024	Glass Animals	Tour of Earth	Kevin Abstract
September 17, 2024	Weezer	Voyage to the Blue Planet	The Flaming Lips Dinosaur Jr.
October 9, 2024	Twenty One Pilots	The Clancy World Tour	Balu Brigada
October 16, 2024	Sabrina Carpenter	Short n' Sweet Tour	amaarae griff Declan McKenna
November 6, 2024	Billie Eilish	Hit Me Hard and Soft: The Tour	Towa Bird
March 26, 2025	Deftones	North American Tour 2025	The Mars Volta Fleshwater
April 11, 2025	Kane Brown	The High Road Tour	Dasha, Scotty McCreery
April 12, 2025	Kane Brown	The High Road Tour	Ashley Cooke, Mitchell Tenpenny
May 6, 2025	Pearl Jam	Dark Matter World Tour	Teen Jesus and the Jean Teasers
May 8, 2025	Pearl Jam	Dark Matter World Tour	Teen Jesus and the Jean Teasers
July 19, 2025	ATEEZ	In Your Fantasy World Tour	
August 19, 2025	Katy Perry	The Lifetimes Tour	Rebecca Black
August 21, 2025	Linkin Park	From Zero World Tour	Jean Dawson
September 6, 2025	Nine Inch Nails	Peel It Back Tour	Boys Noize
September 11, 2025	Tate McRae	Miss Possessive Tour	Zara Larsson
September 6, 2025	Nine Inch Nails	Peel It Back Tour	Boys Noize
September 9, 2025	Benson Boone	American Heart World Tour	Elliot James Reay
November, 4, 2025	Sabrina Carpenter	Short n' Sweet Tour	Olivia Dean Amber Mark
November 5, 2025	Sabrina Carpenter	Short n' Sweet Tour	Olivia Dean Amber Mark
May 2, 2026	Florence and the Machine	Everybody Scream Tour	CMAT

== Awards and nominations ==
The Bridgestone Arena was nominated for the 2007 Pollstar Concert Industry Venue of the Year Award. This is the fourth time the venue has been nominated. The first was in 1998 as the Nashville Arena, and then in 1999 and 2000 as the Gaylord Entertainment Center. In 2017 it was named loudest arena in sports.

== Naming rights ==
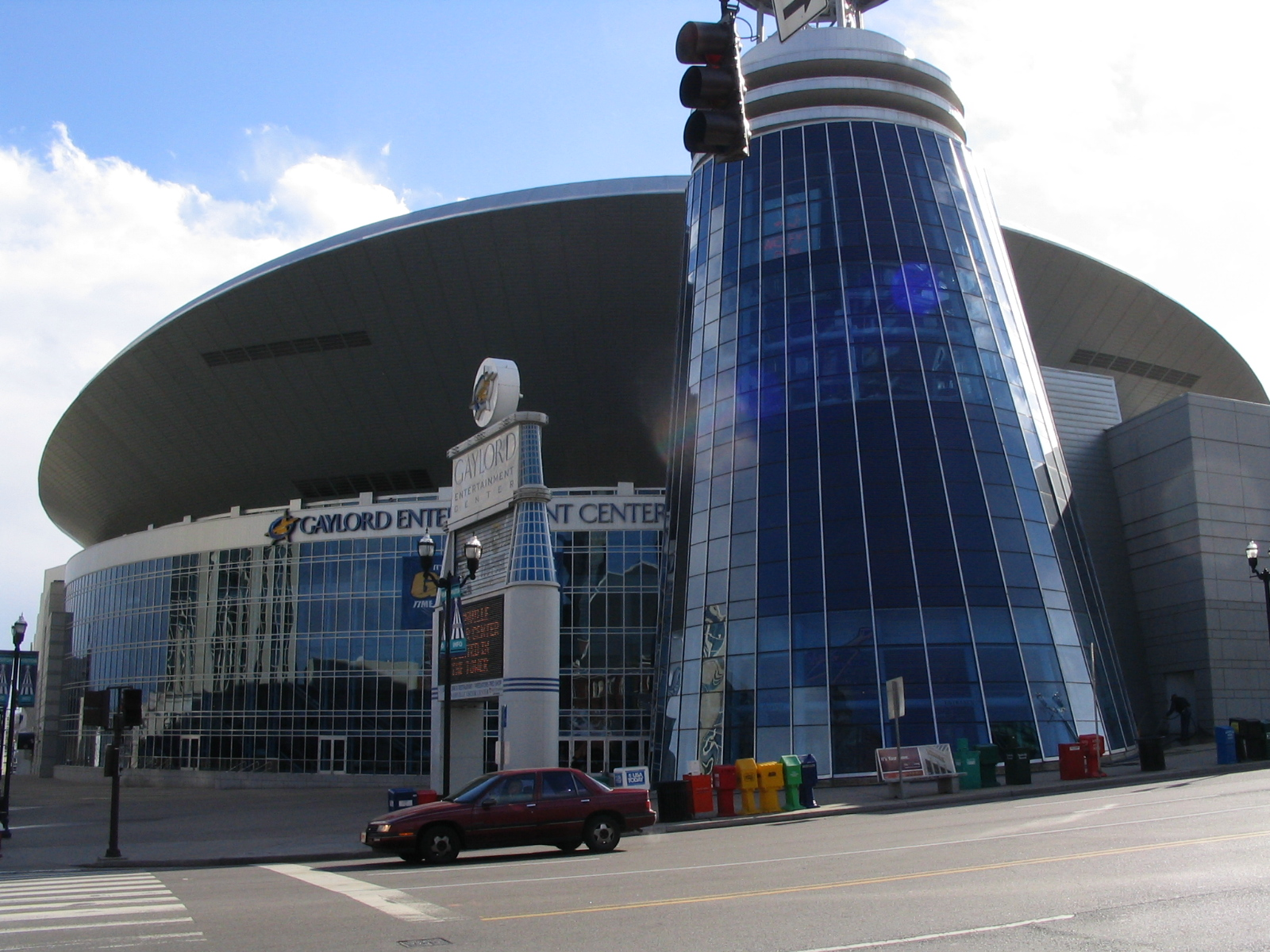
As Gaylord Entertainment Center in 2006

When completed in 1996, the venue was known as Nashville Arena. In 1999, the arena was renamed Gaylord Entertainment Center after a 20-year, $80 million naming rights contract was signed between the Predators and Nashville-based Gaylord Entertainment Company, which at the time was a minority owner of the team.

In February 2005, it was announced that the Predators and Gaylord (which had earlier sold its stake in the team) had reached an agreement terminating any further involvement between them, and that the Gaylord name would remain on the building only until a new purchaser could be found for the naming rights. As a result, many in the Nashville media quickly reverted to calling the facility by its original name. With the beginning of the 2006 season, the Predators began referring to the arena by its original name as well. In doing so, the team replaced the "Gaylord Entertainment Center" wordmark on the center ice circle with the original "Nashville Predators" wordmark from the inaugural season. The "Gaylord Entertainment Center" name, however, was still displayed on the building's exterior signage at that point.

The facility was officially renamed Nashville Arena again, and all Gaylord signage was removed from the building's exterior on March 16, 2007.

On May 18, 2007, Sommet Group, a Franklin-based collection of companies whose services included human resources administration, payroll processing, software development, computer repair, insurance, and risk management, bought the naming rights to the arena, and it became known as Sommet Center. Terms of the deal were not disclosed. The company had previously been the corporate title sponsor for the Predators during the 2007 Stanley Cup Playoffs. The agreement had lasted little more than two years when the Predators sued the Sommet Group on November 25, 2009, for breach of contract, alleging the latter had failed to make numerous payments under the naming rights agreement. As part of the suit, the Predators stated intentions to seek a new title sponsor for the arena. Unlike the Gaylord parting-of-ways, Sommet Group's name was stripped from all signage inside and outside the arena as soon as the team was legally allowed to do so. The arena reverted to the Nashville Arena name after a Nashville Sports Authority meeting approving the change on December 3, 2009. On July 6, 2010, Sommet Group's headquarters were raided by the FBI and IRS due to suspicion of fraudulent activities, and the company subsequently filed for bankruptcy and was liquidated. Sommet's founder, Brian Whitfield, was eventually convicted of fraud, including using some of the fraudulent funds to secure the arena naming rights.

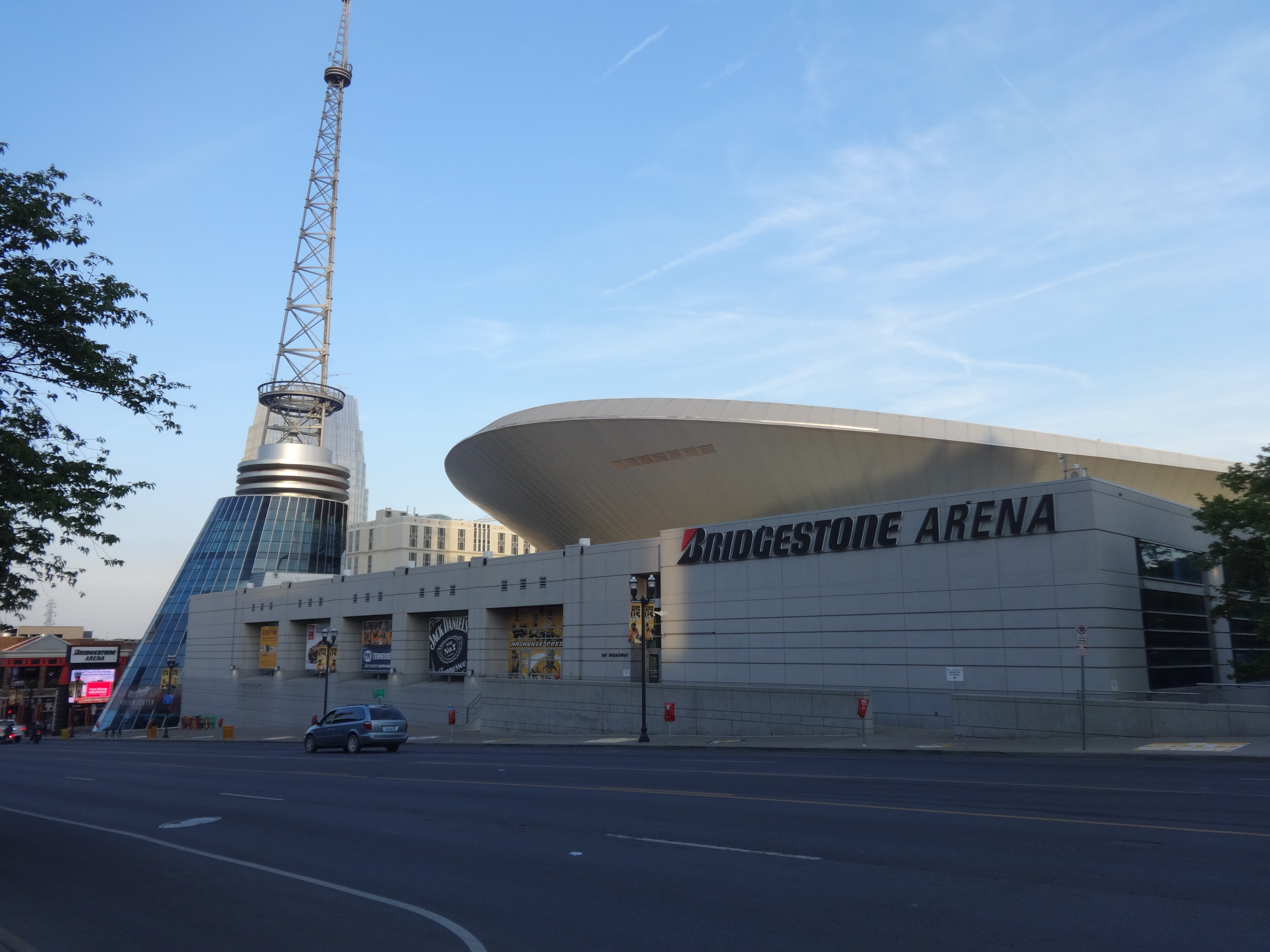
Bridgestone Arena

The building briefly resumed using the Nashville Arena moniker until February 23, 2010, when it was announced that the Predators had signed a naming rights deal with Nashville-based Bridgestone Americas, Inc., the North American subsidiary of Japanese tire manufacturer Bridgestone. The arena became known as Bridgestone Arena.

== Renovations ==
In the summer of 2007 a number of renovations were made to what was then called the Sommet Center at a cost of several million dollars. Renovations included changes to concession stands and public areas, as well as major changes to infrastructure. The most obvious change was the August 2007 replacement of the original center-hanging scoreboard (at a cost of $3.6 million) with a new scoreboard made by ANC Sports. The original analog scoreboard had become outdated and was no longer supported by the original manufacturer, making parts difficult to come by. The new scoreboard is referred to as the "megatron" by arena and Predators staff. In addition, the TV–media control room was renovated at a cost of $2.6 million.

During the summer of 2011, a new NHL-mandated ice and dasherboard system was constructed and installed in the arena. In addition, the south side of the upper concourse was redesigned as a "fan zone". The wall separating the arena and that part of the upper concourse was removed.

In the summer of 2015, the Predators began replacing all of the arena's seating. This project was completed in Summer of 2016.

In the summer of 2019, the scoreboard above center ice was replaced with a new model known as "FangVision" which measures 12 feet (3.7 m) high and 34 feet (10 m) wide, along with the replacement of urinals in the men's toilets with waterless versions.

In the summer of 2026, a three year, multi-phase renovation plan began, with the first phase seeing the south entrance along Demonbreun Street and the current staircase serving the main concourse and clubs upgraded with new escalators, an expansion to the box office, as well as new bars on the Broadway enterence. Future improvements to the ice plant control system will be done in the off seasons of 2027 and 2028.

== Flood damage ==
Twice in the building's history, event level space (located below street level) has sustained significant flood damage.

In early May 2010, downtown Nashville was heavily impacted by a major flooding event. Located 0.3 miles away and uphill from the bank of the Cumberland River, Bridgestone Arena escaped heavy damage, but drainage system backups caused several inches of standing flood water to seep into the building. The Predators had been eliminated from the 2010 Stanley Cup playoffs the week prior, and the arena's schedule was mostly clear for the remainder of May as a result. No events were affected by cleanup and repairs.

On November 25, 2022, a water main beneath Demonbreun Street ruptured, spilling thousands of gallons of water into the arena. Two Predators games were postponed as a result, and a college hockey game planned for Bridgestone Arena was moved to another facility in Nashville.

== See also ==
- List of indoor arenas by capacity
- Nissan Stadium
- New Nissan Stadium
- Music City Center
- Nashville Predators
- Nashville

Preceded by first arena	Home of the Nashville Predators; 1998 – present	Succeeded by current
Preceded by New Orleans Arena	NCAA Women's Division I Basketball Tournament; Finals Venue; 2014	Succeeded by Amalie Arena
Preceded by Nationwide Arena	Host of the NHL All-Star Game; 2016	Succeeded by Staples Center
Preceded by Madison Square Garden	Host of the CMA Award; 2006/2008	Succeeded by current
