= Mortgage Professionals Canada =

Canadian national mortgage association

- Industry: Trade association
- Founded: 1994
- Headquarters: Toronto, Ontario, Canada
- Key people: Lauren van den Berg (President and CEO)
- Products: Professional Designation; Professional Development; Advocacy; Member Benefits
- Website: www.mortgageproscan.ca

Mortgage Professionals Canada (French: Professionnels Hypothécaires du Canada) is the national association representing Canada's mortgage industry. Mortgage Professionals Canada’s membership included 15,500+ mortgage brokers, mortgage lenders, mortgage insurers and other industry stakeholders. Mortgage Professionals Canada (formerly the Canadian Association of Accredited Mortgage Professionals or CAAMP) provides the Accredited Mortgage Professional (AMP) designation in Canada (French: CHA), to qualifying mortgage professionals.

Mortgage Professionals Canada provides mortgage professionals with the Accredited Mortgage Professional (AMP) designation - the national designation for professionals in Canada’s mortgage industry.

Mortgage Professionals Canada is also a consumer advocate, educating Canadian consumers about obtaining a mortgage, and providing access to a cross-country network of mortgage professionals.

== Activities ==
Mortgage Professionals Canada provides advocacy, education and information to mortgage professionals, regulators, and mortgage consumers, to help ensure a transparent and ethical mortgage marketplace in Canada.

Mortgage Professionals Canada’s activities include:

- Providing awareness to Canadian consumers of the benefits of dealing with a mortgage broker
- Commissioning an annual survey report on the Canadian residential mortgage market, released annually in the spring
- Advocating for member interests on legislative and regulatory issues
- Developing, monitoring and promoting mortgage industry standards and conduct, including Mortgage Professionals Canada’s Mortgage Origination Standards, which represent the minimum standards of care and due diligence required for the acceptance, completion and submission of mortgage loan applications during the normal course of business
- Delivering training for mortgage professionals through its professional development courses, including licensing and re-licensing courses, broker courses and AMP designation program courses through Mortgage Campus.

Mortgage Professionals Canada is the official provider of:

- Mortgage Broker and Mortgage Agent education programs that provide Government of Ontario licensing for brokers and agents.
- Mortgage Salespersons Licensing Courses in Manitoba
- Mortgage Associate licensing courses in Saskatchewan
- Materials (Introduction to the Canadian Mortgage Market and Introduction to the Canadian Mortgage Industry 4th ed., 2012 ) for B301 & B321 courses Bachelor of Applied Business – Accounting & Financial Planning courses at George Brown College

- Provide regulatory and educational information to mortgage consumers and association members
- Help Compliance Officers, Fraud Investigators, Quality Assurance Professionals and Corporate Senior Management teams learn of developments of fraudulent activities and fraud prevention initiatives within the mortgage industry through its Mortgage Fraud Summits
- Publish Mortgage Journal magazine eight times annually in English and French, in both print and online formats
- Provide education and networking opportunities to members through its annual Mortgage Forum conference

== AMP designation ==
Mortgage Professionals Canada created the Accredited Mortgage Professional (AMP) designation in 2004 to increase the level of professionalism in Canada’s mortgage industry. AMPs must meet a number of qualifications, which include successfully completing mortgage education courses that cover ethical practice and responsibilities, and completing Continuing Education (CE) units each year in order to maintain their designation.

== Annual conference ==
Held annually in the fall, Mortgage Professionals Canada’s National Mortgage Conference is the largest gathering of mortgage professionals in Canada. The conference offers educational and informational sessions designed to help attendees advance their business, and features keynote speakers, a trade show and networking opportunities for attendees. The 2023 National Mortgage Conference was held October 15-16, 2023, in Toronto, Ontario. The 2024 National Mortgage Conference will be held in Montreal, Quebec.

== Governance ==
Mortgage Professionals Canada is governed by a 6-person executive committee and a 11-person board of directors that represents seven regions across Canada.

== The Foundation ==
The Foundation is committed to raising awareness of the importance of financial literacy and responsible consumer borrowing through a variety of initiatives, such as contributions to Habitat for Humanity, funding of research projects, the provision of education materials and publications as well as establishing scholarships for emerging leaders. The Foundation also currently funds scholarships for post-secondary students in need of financial assistance to assist with their education.

== See also ==
- Real estate broker
- Real estate trends
- List of real estate topics
- Canadian Real Estate Association
- Appraisal Institute
- Mortgage fraud
- Canada Mortgage and Housing Corporation
