= Us the Duo =

Folk pop duo

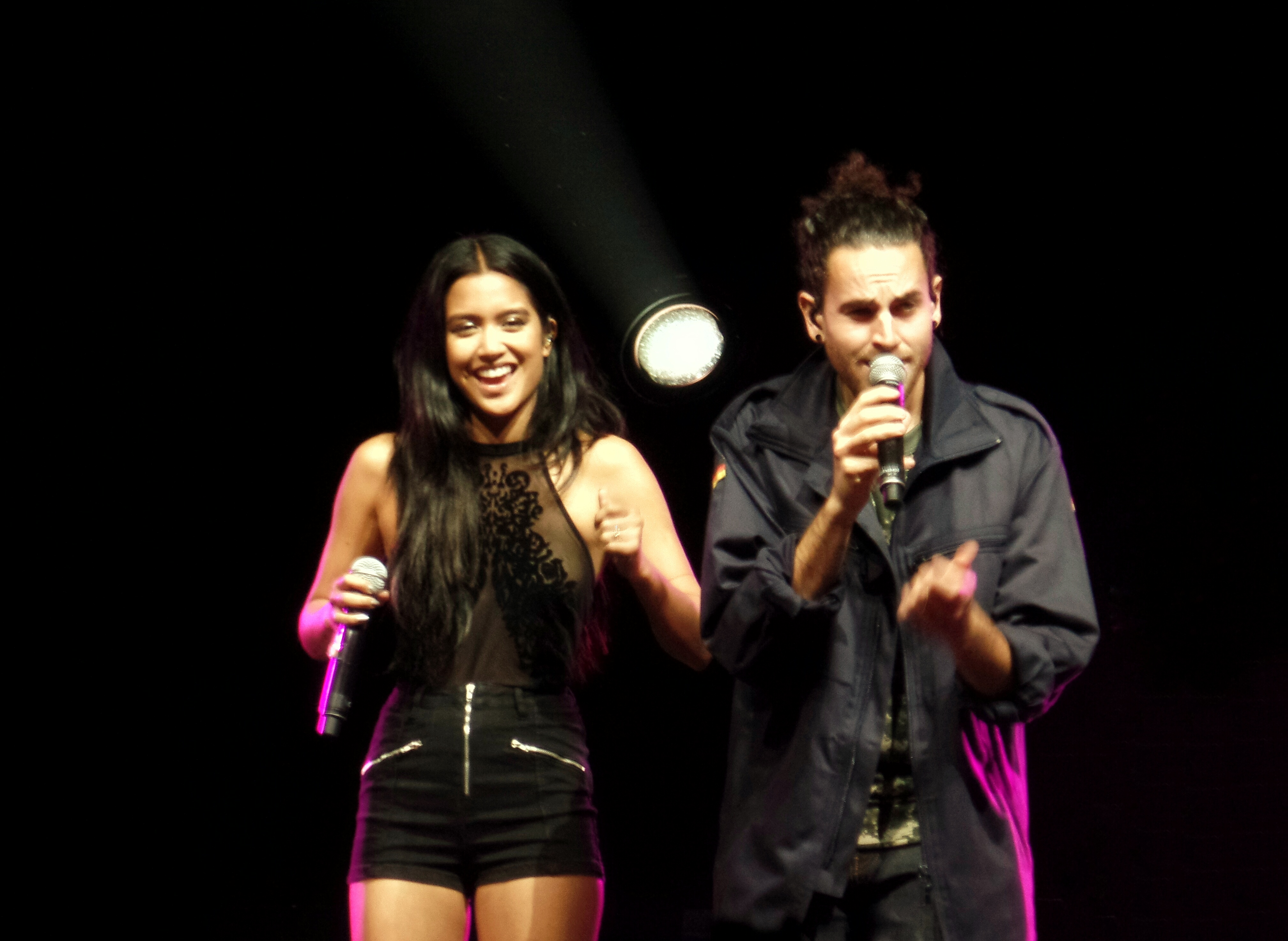
- Us the Duo, live in Cologne, Germany

Background information
- Origin: Los Angeles, California, United States
- Genres: Folk pop
- Years active: 2011–2024
- Labels: Republic, UMG, Alvarado
- Past members: Michael Alvarado; Carissa Rae Martin
- Website: ustheduo.com

Us the Duo was an American folk pop duo consisting of ex husband-and-wife Michael Alvarado and Carissa Rae Martin. The duo met in Los Angeles, California, United States, in 2011 on the set of an AJ Rafael music video. They got married in 2012. In 2013, the duo started uploading six-second cover versions of popular songs to their Vine account, where they amassed 5 million followers as of the time when vine shut down in January 2017. In March 2014, they were signed to Republic Records. They are reported as being the first musicians to have signed to a major record label due to their presence on Vine.

== Career ==
In spring of 2016, Us the Duo joined Pentatonix on their 2016 World Tour visiting various states in the United States, before heading abroad to different venues including London, Paris, Prague, Rome and Tokyo. In addition to their two full-length albums, Us the Duo regularly releases new music, such as the songs "(Stop) Just Love", and "Slow Down Time" as well as a variety of covers, including "2015 Top Hits in 3.5 Minutes". Oprah Winfrey booked the duo for a tour in November 2014 after she saw the film The Book of Life, which featured the duo's song "No Matter Where You Are". Besides touring with Pentatonix, the duo embarked on the Just Love Tour in support of their album Just Love, which was released on July 22, 2016.

On June 5, 2018, they auditioned for America's Got Talent, where they advanced to the next rounds and got eliminated at the semifinals. Shortly after exiting the show, their daughter, Xyla, was born in October of that year.

On March 28, 2024, the couple announced on a Facebook post that they had been living separate for some time and are in the process of a divorce.

== Members ==
Carissa Rae Martin was born and raised in Los Angeles, California. She is Filipino American. She started singing at the age of 5 with a church choir, and has a fashion blog called Wear I Am. Michael Alvarado was born in Michigan and raised in Raleigh, North Carolina and attended Appalachian State University. He is of Puerto Rican descent. He started piano lessons at the age of 7, and started singing when he was in a garage band in high school.

== Discography ==
=== Studio albums ===
- Us (2012)
- No Matter Where You Are (2014)
- Just Love (2016)
- Our Favorite Time of Year (2017)
- Up Until Now (2020)
- Covers from Home (2021)
- One Day at a Time (2023)

=== Extended plays ===
- Public Record (2016)
- Together (2018)
- Home Is Where The Dreams Are (2022)
