= Piece by Piece Tour =

2015 concert tour by Kelly Clarkson

- Tour by Kelly Clarkson
- Promotional poster for tour
- Associated album: Piece by Piece
- Start date: July 11, 2015
- End date: September 10, 2015
- Legs: 1
- No. of shows: 32 in North America
- Box office: U.S. $9.7 million

Kelly Clarkson concert chronology
- 12th Annual Honda Civic Tour (2013); Piece by Piece Tour (2015); Meaning of Life Tour (2019)

The Piece by Piece Tour was the seventh headlining concert tour from American pop recording artist Kelly Clarkson in support of her seventh studio album, Piece by Piece (2015). It began on July 11, 2015, in Hershey, Pennsylvania and concluded on September 10, 2015, in Atlanta. The tour placed 106th for Pollstar's Year End Top 200 North American Toursfall of 2015, grossing $9.7 million.

== Background ==
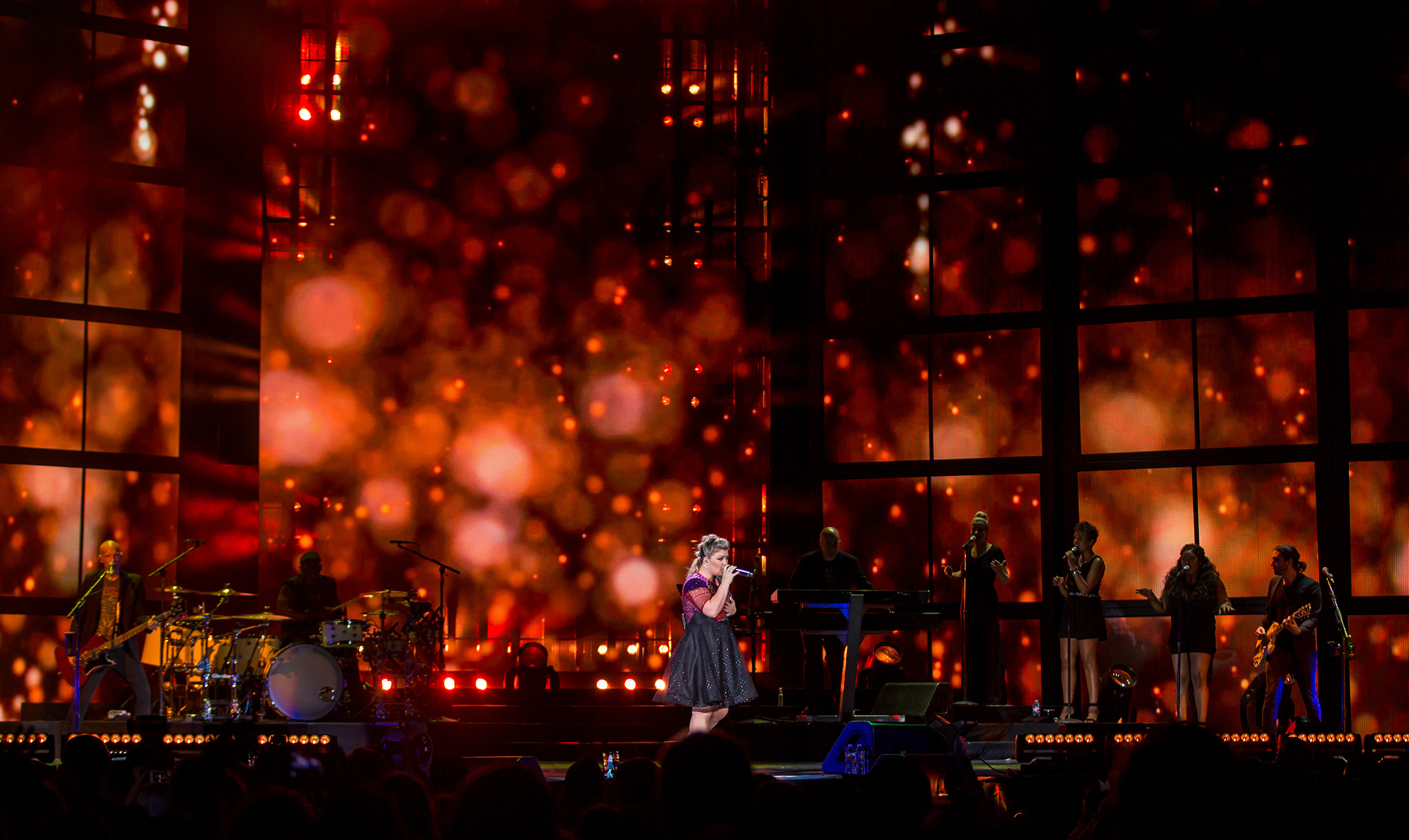
Clarkson performing in Austin

On February 2, 2015, during an interview with Canadian radio station CHFI, Clarkson was asked about the tour. She replied that she just got the routing for the tour, and they would do the United States, part of Canada, then a full run in Canada, with further dates to follow at a later time.

On March 3, 2015, Clarkson formally announced plans for a tour while promoting Piece by Piece (2015) during an appearance on Good Morning America. An official release confirmed dates across North America. Additional Canadian dates were released on March 16, 2015. Tour dates for the United Kingdom were announced on Clarkson's website on August 3, 2015.

Supporting Clarkson in the United States and Toronto were planned opening acts: Eric Hutchinson and Pentatonix. On Clarkson's Facebook page, she showed her excitement about opener Pentatonix. She stated she hoped to convince them to sing with her during her set. Nick Jonas and Tyler Shaw were scheduled to open up for Clarkson in October 2015 in Canada, before dates were ultimately cancelled. On May 21, 2015, it was announced that singer Abi Ann would also be opening up for Clarkson.

Clarkson confirmed plans to include Piece by Piece singles "Heartbeat Song" and "Invincible" in the set list for the show, alongside album-only tracks, "Dance With Me" and "Tightrope", with the latter promised to be a highlight for the show. Speaking to USA Today, Clarkson stated: "Because of an element I've never done on tour, it makes sense to incorporate that song. I'm not flying or on a tightrope – there's not that – but it makes sense with that song and how it sounds on the record that it will fit into the show."

Cancellations

In September 2015, Clarkson tweeted that the last six shows of the U.S. leg of the tour were cancelled. The singer was placed on vocal rest ordered by her doctors. She said, "So bummed that I have to cancel some of my tour dates. This kills me." "I am truly sorry to my fans that have been excited to see this show. Please know that I never cancel anything unless it's absolutely necessary." Two weeks later, the remaining dates of the tour was cancelled. Clarkson commented, "I am truly sorry that I have to cancel the remainder of my tour dates. I was looking forward to sharing this tour with all my amazing fans in Canada and the U.K. Unfortunately my doctor is telling me I have to stay on vocal rest, but I am working hard to get better as fast as possible." Tickets will be refunded.

== Show ==
The show was mixed with her greatest hits, new material off her seventh album Piece by Piece and covers. Clarkson brought back "Fan Requests" which is something she did on the Stronger Tour and 2012 Summer Tour. For "Fan Requests" Clarkson picks a song that was requested via Twitter from someone in the audience each night and her and her band learn the song that day. Starting on July 16, in New York City, Clarkson started doing "KC Classic" in which Clarkson picked a different song each night from her catalog that is not used in the setlist.

Also for this tour Clarkson had an "Open Mic Night" where she gave fans the opportunity to perform a "cover" song on stage. Fans submitted a video of themselves through various social media websites and Clarkson then selected one winner for each city.

Some highlights from the show are Clarkson singing "Heartbeat Song" with opening act Pentatonix and "Walk Away" being mashed up with Mark Ronson and Bruno Mars' hit song "Uptown Funk". She opened the show with "Dance With Me", a track off Piece by Piece and closed with her hit "Since U Been Gone".

== Commercial reception ==
General sales for the tour will begin on Saturday, March 14, 2015. Citi has been listed as the official bank for the tour, with a special pre-sale access will be given to Citi's Private Pass Program members on March 10, 2015. Members of Clarkson's fan club, Kellebrities, will also be given special pre-sale availability. The toured placed 106th on Pollstar's "2015 Year End: Top 200 North American Tours", grossing an estimate of $9.7 million.

== Critical reception ==
Jewel Wicker from The Patriot-News says: "There's singing and then there's 'sanging.' Clarkson does the latter." Sarah Rodman of The Boston Globe said: "the Texas native was in peak form, delivering the hits with gusto, raising otherwise overlooked album cuts to memorable heights, and remaking the case for the restorative powers of pop music on a hot summer night." and "Although Clarkson was joking when she remarked that she is improving with age like fine wine, she was right on the money."

Amy Brooks from the Pittsburgh Post-Gazette says that "the Idol winner launched into a stream of catchy hits that begged to be sung along to, had no problem digging up the emotion to put into the songs." Ben Siegel of The Buffalo News describes the concert as "vocally and musically fantastic.

Adam Graham of The Detroit News says, "Kelly Clarkson has an innate reliability that makes her Not Just Another Pop Star." and "Idol" never produced another star as fresh and off-the-cuff as Clarkson. She speaks her mind, doesn't do the canned banter thing, and chits chats with the crowd like they're a couple of old friends hanging out on her back porch. There's no explanation for it other than she's Kelly, she's an original, and she's our original."

Christopher Rosa from VH1, "she sounded fantastic, but that's nothing new. Kelly has one of the most underrated voices in pop, and her pitch-perfect delivery throughout the evening—even during lyric flubs—was pretty awe-inspiring. However, the glittery rock-pop romp revealed other nuggets about Kelly—as a person and artist—that may surprise you."

Reporter The Oakland Press, Gary Graff states: "it may be time for Kelly Clarkson to have her pop diva credentials re-evaluated." Dallas Observer's Amy McCarthy says "those vocals are so powerful and affecting — it's hard to miss."

Phoenix New Times's Amanda Ventura reports that "Kelly was downright incredible. Her pipes. Those pipes." According to Michael Escoto of The Arizona Republic, "Kelly Clarkson put on a fantastic show. She really showed her range as an artist who is capable of making you dance and sing along with her more fun, upbeat songs but who can also a few songs later make you reach for the tissues to dry your eyes after an emotional punch to the stomach."

== Opening acts ==
- Pentatonix
- Eric Hutchinson
- Abi Ann (select dates)

== Setlist ==
I

Tour stops with this setlist: Hershey, Holmdel

1. "Dance with Me"
2. "My Life Would Suck Without You"
3. "Dark Side"
4. "Mr. Know It All"
5. "Nostalgic"
6. Open Mic
7. Fan Request
8. "Second Wind"
9. "Invincible"
10. Medley: "Because of You" / "Don't You Wanna Stay" / "Breakaway"
11. "Tightrope"
12. "Piece by Piece"
13. "Take You High" (includes elements of Prince's "When Doves Cry")
14. "Behind These Hazel Eyes"
15. "War Paint"
16. KC Classic
17. "Stronger (What Doesn't Kill You)"
18. "Heartbeat Song" (with Pentatonix)
19. Mashup: "Walk Away" / "Uptown Funk" (Mark Ronson & Bruno Mars cover)

Encore

20. "Bang Bang" (Jessie J, Ariana Grande & Nicki Minaj cover)
21. "Miss Independent"
22. "Since U Been Gone"

Notes

- "Miss Independent" was not performed in Hershey due to curfew.
- "Second Wind" was not performed in Hershey.
II

Tour stops with this set: Mansfield

1. "Dance With Me"
2. "My Life Would Suck Without You"
3. "Catch My Breath"
4. "Mr. Know It All
5. "Let Your Tears Fall"
6. Open Mic
7. Fan Request
8. "Invincible"
9. Medley: "Because of You"/"Don't You Wanna Stay"/"Breakaway"
10. "Tightrope"
11. "Piece by Piece"
12. "Take You High" (includes elements of Prince's "When Doves Cry")
13. "Behind These Hazel Eyes"
14. "Stronger (What Doesn't Kill You)"
15. "Heartbeat Song" (performed with Pentatonix)
16. Mashup: "Walk Away" / "Uptown Funk" (Mark Ronson & Bruno Mars cover)

Encore

17. "Bang, Bang" (Jessie J, Ariana Grande & Nicki Minaj cover)
18. "Miss Independent"
19. "Since U Been Gone"
III

Tour stops with this set: New York City, Burgettstown, Darien, Uncasville, Toronto, Clarkston, Cincinnati, Noblesville, Rosemont, Maryland Heights, Las Vegas, Mountain View, Phoenix, Albuquerque, The Woodlands

1. "Dance With Me"
2. "My Life Would Suck Without You"
3. "Catch My Breath"
4. "Nostalgic"
5. "Mr. Know It All"
6. "Second Wind"
7. "Invincible"
8. "Piece by Piece
9. Medley:"Because of You" / "Breakaway"
10. "Tightrope"
11. "Take You High (includes elements of Prince's "When Doves Cry")
12. "Behind These Hazel Eyes"
13. Open Mic
14. Fan request
15. KC Classic
16. "Stronger (What Doesn't Kill You)
17. "Heartbeat Song" (performed with Pentatonix)
18. Mashup: "Walk Away" / "Uptown Funk" (Mark Ronson & Bruno Mars cover)

Encore

20. "Bang Bang" (Jessie J, Ariana Grande & Nicki Minaj cover)
21. "Miss Independent"
22. "Since U Been Gone"

Notes

- "Heartbeat Song" was performed as the album version without Pentatonix on the second night in New York (July 17), and in Albuquerque.

- "Dark Side" took place of "Catch My Breath" in Mountain View, Albuquerque, Austin, The Woodlands
- "Second Wind" was not performed in Noblesville, Las Vegas, Mountain View, Phoenix, and Albuquerque.

=== Fan Requests ===
North America
- Hershey: "Nobody Love" (Tori Kelly cover)
- Mansfield: "Radioactive" (Imagine Dragons cover)
- Holmdel: "Love Me Like You Do" (Ellie Goulding cover)
- New York City — July 16: "Jealous" (Nick Jonas cover)
- New York City — July 17: "Stuff Like That There" (Betty Hutton cover chosen by Kelly herself, "because I'm here two nights")
- Burgettstown: "Stay" (Rihanna cover)
- Darien: "Bye Bye Bye" (NSYNC cover)
- Uncasville: "Can't Help Falling in Love" (Elvis Presley cover)
- Toronto: "Blank Space" (Taylor Swift cover)
- Clarkston: "Habits" (Tove Lo cover)
- Cincinnati: "With a Little Help from My Friends" (The Beatles cover)
- Noblesville: "Wrecking Ball" (Miley Cyrus cover)
- Rosemont: "If It Makes You Happy" (Sheryl Crow cover)
- Maryland Heights: "Valerie" (The Zutons cover)
- Saint Paul: "Purple Rain" (Prince and The Revolution cover)
- Denver: "Misery" (P!nk cover)
- West Valley City: "Heaven" (Bryan Adams cover)
- Portland: "Rain" (Patty Griffin cover)
- Seattle: "No One Else on Earth" (Wynonna Judd cover)
- Las Vegas: "Off to the Races" (Lana Del Rey cover)
- San Diego: "Killing Me Softly with His Song" (Roberta Flack cover)
- Los Angeles: "Cool for the Summer" (Demi Lovato cover)
- Wheatland: "Take a Bow" (Madonna cover)
- Mountain View: "Sunday Morning" (Maroon 5 cover)
- Phoenix: "The Heart Wants What It Wants" (Selena Gomez cover)
- Albuquerque: "Jolene" (Dolly Parton cover)
- Nashville: "Love Me Like a Man" (Bonnie Raitt cover)

=== KC Classic ===
North America

No KC Classic in Hershey, Mansfield, Holmdel, Toronto, Maryland Heights, Albuquerque, Austin, Dallas, The Woodlands, Little Rock, Nashville.

- New York City — July 16: "The Trouble With Love Is"
- New York City — July 17: "People Like Us"
- Burgettstown: "Never Again"
- Darien: "Don't Let Me Stop You"
- Uncasville: "Beautiful Disaster"
- Clarkston: "Low"
- Cincinnati: "Hear Me"
- Noblesville "Chivas"
- Rosemont: "Ready"
- Saint Paul: "Just Missed the Train"
- Denver: #"I Hate Myself for Losing You"
- West Valley City: "Maybe"
- Portland: "Save You"
- Seattle: "You Love Me"
- Las Vegas: "Thankful"
- San Diego: "Addicted"
- Los Angeles: "Sober"
- Wheatland: "How I Feel"
- Mountain View: "Breaking Your Own Heart
- Phoenix: "Einstein"

== Tour dates ==
Date	City	Country	Venue	Opening acts
July 11, 2015	Hershey	United States	Hersheypark Stadium	Pentatonix; Eric Hutchinson; Abi Ann
July 12, 2015	Mansfield	United States	Xfinity Center	Pentatonix; Eric Hutchinson; Abi Ann
July 14, 2015	Holmdel	United States	PNC Bank Arts Center	Pentatonix; Eric Hutchinson; Abi Ann
July 16, 2015	New York City	United States	Radio City Music Hall	Pentatonix; Eric Hutchinson
July 17, 2015	New York City	United States	Radio City Music Hall	Pentatonix; Eric Hutchinson
July 19, 2015	Burgettstown	United States	First Niagara Pavilion	Pentatonix; Eric Hutchinson; Abi Ann
July 21, 2015	Darien	United States	Darien Lake Performing Arts Center	Pentatonix; Eric Hutchinson; Abi Ann
July 23, 2015	Uncasville	United States	Mohegan Sun Arena	Pentatonix; Eric Hutchinson; Abi Ann
July 25, 2015	Toronto	Canada	Molson Canadian Amphitheatre	Pentatonix; Eric Hutchinson; Abi Ann
July 26, 2015	Clarkston	United States	DTE Energy Music Theatre	Pentatonix; Eric Hutchinson; Abi Ann
July 28, 2015	Cincinnati	United States	Riverbend Music Center	Pentatonix; Eric Hutchinson; Abi Ann
July 30, 2015	Noblesville	United States	Klipsch Music Center	Pentatonix; Eric Hutchinson; Abi Ann
August 1, 2015	Rosemont	United States	Allstate Arena	Pentatonix; Eric Hutchinson; Abi Ann
August 2, 2015	Maryland Heights	United States	Hollywood Casino Amphitheatre	Pentatonix; Eric Hutchinson; Abi Ann
August 4, 2015	Saint Paul	United States	Xcel Energy Center	Pentatonix; Eric Hutchinson; Abi Ann
August 6, 2015	Denver	United States	Pepsi Center	Pentatonix; Eric Hutchinson; Abi Ann
August 8, 2015	West Valley City	United States	USANA Amphitheatre	Pentatonix; Eric Hutchinson; Abi Ann
August 10, 2015	Portland	United States	Moda Center	Pentatonix; Eric Hutchinson; Abi Ann
August 12, 2015	Seattle	United States	KeyArena	Pentatonix; Eric Hutchinson; Abi Ann
August 15, 2015	Las Vegas	United States	Mandalay Bay Events Center	Pentatonix; Eric Hutchinson; Abi Ann
August 16, 2015	San Diego	United States	Viejas Arena	Pentatonix; Eric Hutchinson; Abi Ann
August 19, 2015	Los Angeles	United States	Staples Center	Pentatonix; Eric Hutchinson; Abi Ann
August 21, 2015	Wheatland	United States	Toyota Amphitheatre	Pentatonix; Eric Hutchinson; Abi Ann
August 23, 2015	Mountain View	United States	Shoreline Amphitheatre	Pentatonix; Eric Hutchinson; Abi Ann
August 25, 2015	Phoenix	United States	Ak-Chin Pavilion	Pentatonix; Eric Hutchinson; Abi Ann
August 27, 2015	Albuquerque	United States	Isleta Amphitheater	Pentatonix; Eric Hutchinson; Abi Ann
August 29, 2015	Austin	United States	Austin360 Amphitheater	Pentatonix; Eric Hutchinson; Abi Ann
August 30, 2015	Dallas	United States	Gexa Energy Pavilion	Pentatonix; Eric Hutchinson; Abi Ann
September 1, 2015	The Woodlands	United States	Cynthia Woods Mitchell Pavilion	Pentatonix; Eric Hutchinson; Abi Ann
September 3, 2015	North Little Rock	United States	Verizon Arena	Pentatonix; Eric Hutchinson; Abi Ann
September 5, 2015	Nashville	United States	Bridgestone Arena	Pentatonix; Eric Hutchinson; Abi Ann
September 10, 2015	Atlanta	United States	Aaron's Amphitheatre	Pentatonix; Eric Hutchinson; Abi Ann

=== Cancelled shows ===
Date	City	Country	Venue	Reason
September 12, 2015	Wolf Trap	United States	Filene Center	Vocal rest ordered by her doctors
September 13, 2015	Wolf Trap	United States	Filene Center	Vocal rest ordered by her doctors
September 15, 2015	Tampa	United States	MidFlorida Credit Union Amphitheatre	Vocal rest ordered by her doctors
September 17, 2015	West Palm Beach	United States	Perfect Vodka Amphitheatre	Vocal rest ordered by her doctors
September 19, 2015	Raleigh	United States	Walnut Creek Amphitheatre	Vocal rest ordered by her doctors
September 20, 2015	Camden	United States	BB&T Pavilion	Vocal rest ordered by her doctors
October 1, 2015	Ottawa	Canada	Canadian Tire Centre	Vocal rest ordered by her doctors
October 2, 2015	Montreal	Canada	Bell Centre	Vocal rest ordered by her doctors
October 4, 2015	London	Canada	Budweiser Gardens	Vocal rest ordered by her doctors
October 7, 2015	Winnipeg	Canada	MTS Centre	Vocal rest ordered by her doctors
October 10, 2015	Saskatoon	Canada	SaskTel Centre	Vocal rest ordered by her doctors
October 12, 2015	Calgary	Canada	Scotiabank Saddledome	Vocal rest ordered by her doctors
October 14, 2015	Edmonton	Canada	Rexall Place	Vocal rest ordered by her doctors
October 15, 2015	Dawson Creek	Canada	EnCana Events Centre	Vocal rest ordered by her doctors
October 17, 2015	Vancouver	Canada	Rogers Arena	Vocal rest ordered by her doctors
November 10, 2015	Dublin	Ireland	3Arena	—N/a
November 12, 2015	Glasgow	Scotland	SSE Hydro	—N/a
November 14, 2015	Birmingham	England	Genting Arena	—N/a
November 16, 2015	Leeds	England	First Direct Arena	—N/a
November 18, 2015	Manchester	England	Manchester Arena	—N/a
November 20, 2015	London	England	SSE Arena	—N/a

=== Box office score data ===
Venue	City	Tickets sold / Available	Gross revenue
Radio City Music Hall	New York City	11,143 / 11,581 (96%)	$992,105
Mohegan Sun Arena	Uncasville	5,216 / 5,711 (91%)	$491,340
DTE Energy Music Theatre	Clarkston	11,896 / 14,788 (80%)	$431,500
Staples Center	Los Angeles	10,961 / 12,314 (89%)	$615,055
Bridgestone Arena	Nashville	10,760 / 12,699 (85%)	$484,035
TOTAL		49,976 / 57,093 (88%)	$3,014,035

== Personnel ==
Band

- Lead vocals: Kelly Clarkson
- Keyboards & musical director: Jason Halbert
- Guitar: Jaco Caraco & Aben Eubanks
- Bass: Einar Pedersen
- Drums: Lester Estelle
- Backup vocalists: Jessi Collins, Nicole Hurst, Bridget Sarai

Other

- Assistant: Ashley Arrison
- Booking: CAA
- Management: Narvel Blackstock & Starstuck Management
- Tour Manager: Dennis Sharp
- Production Manager: Allan Hornall
- Artist Production Manager: Chris Dye
- Production Assistant: Tricia Farrow
- Lighting Director: Fraser Mckeen
- Security: Brian Butner & NPB Companies, Inc.
- FOH Engineer: Chris Michaelessi
- Monitor Engineer: Shaun Sebastian
- Photography: Weiss Eubanks
- Hair & Makeup: Ashley Donovan
- Stylist: Steph Ashmore
- Wardrobe designer: Sylvio Kovacic
