= Dead (EP) =

EP by Blackbear
- Released: June 2, 2015
- Genre: Folk pop; alternative R&B
- Length: 15:53
- Label: Beartrap
- Producer: Blackbear

Blackbear chronology
Deadroses (2015)	Dead (2015)	Help (2015)

Dead (stylized in all lowercase) is the third EP by American singer Blackbear. It was released on June 2, 2015 through his independent record label Beartrap. The EP contains acoustic guitar-led versions of four songs from his debut album Deadroses as well as the exclusive track "Weak When Ur Around". The EP was also included as the deluxe of Deadroses.

The EP peaked at No. 36 on the Billboard Top R&B/Hip-Hop Albums chart.

== Track listing ==
All tracks are produced by Blackbear.

Dead track listing
No.	Title	Writer(s)	Length
1.	"Dirty Laundry"	Matthew Musto	2:40
2.	"Idfc"	Musto	3:27
3.	"90210"	Musto; G-Eazy; Bryan Fryzel; Ben Harrison	3:27
4.	"Weak When Ur Around"	Musto	2:49
5.	"4U"	Musto; Tearce Kizzo	3:30
Total length:			15:53

- All song titles are stylized in lowercase letters.
- "4U" contains elements of "I Needed You" from Deadroses.

== Charts ==
Chart (2015)	Peak position
US Top R&B/Hip-Hop Albums (Billboard)	36
US Heatseekers Albums (Billboard)	5
