= John Splithoff =

American musician

- Born: June 5, 1990 (age 36); Chicago, Illinois
- Genres: Pop, neo-soul
- Occupation: Musician
- Instruments: Vocals, guitar, piano
- Years active: 2013–present
- Labels: Pleasant Lane Music, East West Records, Asylum Worldwide
- Website: www.johnsplithoff.com

John Robert Splithoff (born June 5, 1990) is an American singer-songwriter, multi-instrumentalist, and music producer from Chicago, based in Los Angeles. He released his debut studio album All In in 2021 after a number of EPs and singles starting in 2013, including the 2016 Billboard top 10 hit "Sing To You". His second full-length album, Far From Here, was released March 21, 2025.

Apart from his own solo work, Splithoff has collaborated as a songwriter and producer, as well as a touring guest artist, sideman and opening act for musicians including Chris Botti, Great Good Fine OK, Autograf, Andy Grammer, Ben Rector, Maya Delilah, Toro Y Moi, Quinn XCII, Fletcher, Emmet Cohen, Madison Ryann Ward, MAX, Ben Folds, George Benson, Gabrielle Aplin, and Teddy Swims.

== Early life ==
Splithoff grew up in Glenview, Illinois, near Chicago. He graduated from Glenbrook South High School in 2009.

He was inspired by many different genres of music growing up, with his family constantly playing the music of Marvin Gaye, Earth Wind & Fire, The Doobie Brothers, Sade, Pink Floyd, and James Taylor around the house. Studying piano and guitar while growing up, he began singing after auditioning for a male vocal group after not making the baseball team his freshman year in high school. This inspired him to study music theory, begin writing and recording his own original music, perform in bands and school musicals, and go on to study jazz performance, songwriting, and music production at the Frost School of Music at the University of Miami. He graduated with a bachelor's degree in 2013. During his time at Miami, he performed in Downbeat Award-winning vocal groups. He returned in 2021 to headline Frost Music Fest '21, the first concert held at the school after the COVID-19 quarantines.

== Career ==
Splithoff moved to New York City in 2013 after recording his five-track debut EP The Move in Chicago. He began performing professionally at clubs like The Bitter End, Rockwood Music Hall, and Mercury Lounge. He continued to write and record his own music while performing around the city as a full-time gigging musician.

=== The Move and early singles ===
Splithoff released his first EP, The Move, in November 2013. The title refers to his relocation to New York City. Reviewing the EP, Cole Scott of On Tour Magazine called Splithoff the "great discovery of 2013" and praised his "mature, developed, soulful voice" and "swoon-worthy, velvet-pop hooks."

Splithoff was featured in September 2014 on the Band of the Day music website, which called his music "velvety, swoon-worthy soulful pop from Chicago that'll warm you up on windy days."

His 2014 single "What If She Wants You" was co-produced with Los Angeles duo Noise Club (Rob McCurdy and Chris Petrosino, also known for indie-pop band The Morning Of). The song received nearly 200,000 plays on SoundCloud. Music blog Soulbounce called it "a midnight steamer that slinks on synths and R&B sensibility," adding that "he's got a lotta soul in him and has a keen ear to the old school like Mayer Hawthorne."

==== "Sing To You" ====
Splithoff's breakthrough single was 2016's "Sing To You", another co-production with Noiseclub. The song reached No. 10 on Billboard magazine's Adult Contemporary singles chart on July 14, 2018, and peaked at No. 8 on the Adult Contemporary charts. It became a hit via streaming sites including YouTube and Spotify, where it received tens of millions of streams, and became one of the service's most viral tracks in 2016. It was also in rotation on SiriusXM radio station The Pulse and LiteFM's Delilah show. He later released an acoustic version, as well as a solo performance video filmed under a train overpass in Chicago's West Loop neighborhood.

==== "Show Me" ====
Splithoff followed "Sing To You" with the 2017 single "Show Me", a duet with Nashville-based singer-songwriter Madison Ryann Ward. Billboard writer Taylor Weatherby wrote that "Show Me" "continues the upbeat vibe he introduced with 'Sing To You'" while evolving in a more dance-oriented direction. AllMusic's Erlewine agreed, writing that the song "pared down some of [Splithoff's] rock influences and increased the electronic gloss", a stylistic change that would continue throughout his later career. Splithoff co-produced the song with hip-hop/R&B musician Aalias (Eminem, Rihanna, DJ Snake).

=== Make It Happen ===
Splithoff signed with East West Records in 2017, and released the six-track EP Make It Happen in 2018 on the associated label Asylum Records. That year, he performed a set of material from Make It Happen on Okayplayer's Okay Acoustic Live sessions on Facebook, including a debut of his song "Raye". Splithoff would later amicably part ways with the label and return to releasing music independently, citing burnout after the experience of trying to craft a commercial followup to ‘Sing To You’, telling one interviewer that "I kind of felt my writing had changed to the point where it didn't feel like me."

His 2019 single "Proud" was co-written by Scott Harris (Chainsmokers, Shawn Mendes) and co-produced with Aalias. The song's accompanying music video was premiered on Billboard's website. The magazine's Taylor Weatherby praised the song's "airy" R&B sound.

In 2020, Splithoff released two EPs, Go Somewhere and Good To See You.

=== All In ===
In 2021, Splithoff released his debut full-length album, All In, after launching his self-owned label, Pleasant Lane Music, distributed by Virgin Music Group. He wrote most of the songs in a period of isolation in his apartment in 2019, and recorded most of the album just before the quarantines of the COVID-19 pandemic went into effect in 2020, finishing final mixes and engineering during lockdown. In an interview with American Songwriter, Splithoff described All In as half extroverted and half introverted, "a balance of outwardly confessional love songs with self-analytical inner turmoil." The album builds on Splithoff's love of classic soul and funk, with inspirations including Marvin Gaye on "Note To Self", Chic guitarist Nile Rodgers on "Holding On To Me," and Seal and Jamiroquai on "Thrive". About half the album was produced with Los Angeles duo Likeminds.

All In was critically well received. Steve Horowitz of the music website PopMatters called All In "urban fire for the 21st century," rating it 8 out of 10, and wrote that the songs seemed prescient of the national mood during the pandemic because of Splithoff's ability to channel "struggles and celebrations, insecurities and overconfidence, the way one does one left alone in the dark. ... What makes it special is how Splithoff breathily expresses his happiness." Lisa Konicki of American Songwriter wrote that the album "embraces love and loneliness, carefree independence and the burning need for connection." The music blog Soulstrutter rated All In 7.4 out of 10. Caleb Campbell of Under the Radar magazine wrote that "Holding On To Me" blended "buoyant melodies with an upbeat disco groove" and said that Splithoff blended "the classic romanticism of vintage R&B and soul with a distinctly modern pop sensibility".

A video for "Steady", filmed in New York City, was released in April 2021. In keeping with the song's theme of being grateful for loved ones, it was compiled from 50 years of home recordings of Splithoff's family.

The song "Fahrenheit," released as a single just before All In and later on the album itself, was co-written and co-produced with Alex Mendoza, who previously produced SHAED’s 2018 hit “Trampoline”. Matt Wallock of American Songwriter praised the song's "buoyant guitar, dreamy synths, and lush beats" and called Splithoff's vocals "soaring and sensual." Carolyn Droke of Uproxx called "Fahrenheit" "fiery" and "irresistibly smooth."

In April 2021, Splithoff's song "Raye" was performed by American Idol contestant Graham DeFranco on the first episode of the show's 19th season. USA Today writer Charles Trepany called the rendition "groovy."

In July 2021, he released the three-song All In (Acoustic) EP, including solo arrangements of his songs "WGYG" and "Slow to Rise" and a cover of The Platters' "Only You (And You Alone)."

During quarantine, Splithoff hosted weekly benefit shows over streaming from his New York apartment. Splithoff donated a portion of the proceeds from his livestreams and album sales during the COVID-19 pandemic to charities including the Trevor Project, the NAACP Legal Defense Fund, MusiCares, Columbia Medical and New York Presbyterian.

The three-song Blue Christmas EP, featuring covers of the traditional holiday songs "Blue Christmas" and "I'll Be Home For Christmas," was released in 2023.

In 2024, Splithoff released the single "Way Back."

In 2025, Splithoff released a pair of singles, "Tangled”/“Magenta (Days Go By)" and "Plateau”/“Same Page", in advance of his album Far From Here, which will be released March 21, 2025 on Pleasant Lane Music/Virgin Records. A video for "Magenta" premiered on the website of the music magazine Relix.

=== Chris Botti and other collaborations ===
Splithoff has worked frequently with Grammy-winning jazz trumpeter Chris Botti, including writing the romantic ballad "Paris" on Botti's 2023 album Vol. 1, produced by David Foster. Reviewer Bobby Patrick of BroadwayWorld called "Paris" "uber-romantic" and said that "Splithoff's soothing but precise vocals and poetry of the words make this a song for lovers walking in the city of lights." Splithoff has also performed as a member of Botti's live band, including his 2024 world tour, with appearances and on-stage performances with performers including Sting, David Foster, Katherine McPhee, and comedian Caroline Rhea.

Splithoff's other collaborations include co-writing Jeff LeBlanc's 2018 single “Way You Are” with LeBlanc and Stephen Gause. He co-wrote the song "Hold Me Back" on EDM/dance-music group Autograf's 2019 EP Love & Retrograde, on which he also sings lead vocal. The band's Mikul Wing told Billboard that Splithoff's lyrics, about trying to stay creative in the face of hardship, "really spoke to us" and encouraged the band "not to give up on our dream" after several years of personal setbacks. Splithoff guested on the song "See Me Here, See Me Now" on LA-based synth pop duo Great Good Fine OK's 2021 EP Great Good FIVE OK. Splithoff sang and arranged vocals for singer-songwriter Melissa Polinar's 2022 single "February Song." In 2023, Splithoff played guitar on Toronto R&B/indie-pop artist nodisco's single "Blame". Noah Wade of Melodic Magazine praised the song as reminiscent of John Mayer, calling it "a funky tune with a killer melodic line", and said that Splithoff's solo was "expertly crafted." Erika Isaacs of the website Unheard Gems called it the "perfect mix of an upbeat and head-bobbing instrumental with lyrics of fresh heartbreak." Splithoff also played guitar on R&B singer Khaki's single "Other Side" and New York-based band East Love's 2019 single "Sunday Afternoon". Splithoff sang on rapper YONAS’s 2021 single "Glory".

== Streaming and international success ==
Splithoff has had considerable success on streaming services such as Spotify, Pandora, and at Adult Contemporary radio. The website Music Metrics Vault has estimated that Splithoff's songs have been streamed more than 150 million times as of May 2024. He has been profiled by music publications such as American Songwriter and Billboard, and the GRAMMY Museum’s Programs at Home series.

His music has received international support and acclaim from fans in Australia, China, Indonesia, New Zealand and the Philippines. In New Zealand, The Masked Singer NZ contestant Eroni Clarke performed Splithoff's song "Sing To You" on the eighth episode of the show's 2022 season. In 2021, South Korean K-pop star Yunho performed to Splithoff's song "Vices" on the popular YouTube channel Studio Choom.

== Artistry and musical style ==
Splithoff has a four-octave voice, and is proficient on both guitar and piano. His musical style fuses pop, R&B, soul, electro. jazz, and funk. His musical influences include Marvin Gaye, Prince, John Mayer, Tears for Fears, The Beatles, Empire of the Sun, Take 6, and D’Angelo. He has cited Pat Metheny, John Mayer and Pink Floyd's David Gilmour as guitar influences.

Stephen Thomas Erlewine of AllMusic wrote that Splithoff's musical style mixes "throwback soul, modern production, and a laid-back pop vibe." Hannah Steinkopf-Frank of the Chicago Tribune, writing about Splithoff's 2018 performance at the Lollapalooza festival, called his singing voice "butter smooth" and said his songwriting "felt like a love letter to the audience." As a lyricist, Splithoff gravitates toward universal subjects such as love and heartbreak, the desire for human connection, and staying true to one's beliefs and dreams. "I write a lot of my songs about breakups, and getting back together," he said in an interview with On Tour Magazine.

== Discography ==
All In
Review scores
Source	Rating
Popmatters	8/10 stars
Soulstrutter	7.4/10 stars

=== Albums and EPs ===
- The Move EP (2013)
- Make It Happen EP (Asylum Worldwide, 2018)
- Go Somewhere EP (Pleasant Lane Music, 2020)
- Good To See You EP (Pleasant Lane Music, 2020)
- All In (Pleasant Lane Music, 2021)
- All In (Acoustic) EP (2021)
- Blue Christmas EP (Pleasant Lane Music, 2023)
- Far From Here (2025)

=== Singles ===
- "What If She Wants You" (Pleasant Lane Music, 2014)
- "Sing To You" (Asylum, 2016)
- "Show Me" (Asylum, 2017)
- "Raye" (Asylum/Atlantic, 2018)
- "Vices" (East West Records, 2018)
- "Like You Talk To Me" (East West Records, 2019)
- "Proud" (2019)
- "Fahrenheit" (Pleasant Lane Music, 2021)
- "Inside Out" (Pleasant Lane Music, 2021)
- "Steady" (Pleasant Lane Music, 2021)
- "Holding On To Me" (Pleasant Lane Music, 2021)
- "Somewhere in New York" (Pleasant Lane Music, 2022)
- "Way Back" (Pleasant Lane Music, 2024)
- "Tangled”/“Magenta (Days Go By)" (Pleasant Lane Music, 2025)
- "Plateau”/“Same Page" (Pleasant Lane Music, 2025)

=== Guest appearances ===
- Saturn & Orygin, "Woke" (2015)
- Armando Young and John Splithoff, "Stepping Stone" single (2017)
- Jeff LeBlanc, “Way You Are” (2018)
- Autograf, Love & Retrograde EP (2019) - vocals on "Hold Me Back"
- East Love, "Sunday Afternoon" (2019)
- Brasstracks, Golden Ticket (EQT Recordings + Capitol Records, 2020) - vocals on "Nothing Better"
- Great Good Fine OK, Great Good FIVE OK EP (2021) - guest on "See Me Here, See Me Now"
- YONAS, "Glory" (2021)
- Melissa Polinar, "February Song" (2022)
- nodisco featuring John Splithoff, "Blame" (2023)
- Chris Botti with John Splithoff, "Paris" (Blue Note Records, 2024)
