= Gone (Bebe Rexha song) =

Single by Bebe Rexha
- Released: December 19, 2014
- Genre: Pop
- Length: 3:47
- Label: Warner Bros.
- Songwriter(s): Maki Athanasiou; Bryan Fryzel; Aaron Kleinstub; Bebe Rexha
- Producer(s): Frequency; Aalias

Bebe Rexha singles chronology
"I'm Gonna Show You Crazy" (2014)	"Gone" (2014)	"Hey Mama" (2015)

"Gone" is a song by American singer Bebe Rexha. It was released on December 19, 2014.

The song tells of the singer lamenting a past love. The chorus contains the lyrics "'Cause I'm a lost river that'll never reach the sea / When you're not here with me, when you're gone / I'm sick to my bones, I don't feel natural / Without you I'm not whole, when you're gone."

In Australia, the song was used in television advertisements promoting the drama series Love Child on the Nine Network.

== Background ==
Following appearances on albums by Pitbull (Globalization) and David Guetta (Listen), Rexha worked on a follow-up to her debut solo single "I Can't Stop Drinking About You", released earlier in 2014.

On December 19, Rexha released two singles, "I'm Gonna Show You Crazy" and "Gone". "Gone" is described as "a tender, piano and string-filled ballad and was produced and co-written by Frequency and Aalias, the same team behind Eminem's 'The Monster'."

== Review ==
Luis Gonzalez of Album Confessions said; "'Gone' succeeds thanks to the stripped back production, Rexha's impressive delivery and a touching, heartbreaking message of lost love. The perfect blend of soft strings and piano turn out to be the right fit for a sure-to-be-critically-acclaimed performance. It is a delicate ballad tailored for Top 40 radio and one that screams for attention for all the right reasons."

== Charts ==
Chart (2015)	Peak position
Australia (ARIA)	87

== Release history ==
Country	Date	Format	Label	Ref.
Various	December 19, 2014	Digital download	Warner Bros.	
