= Deadroses =

2015 album by Blackbear

Studio album by Blackbear
- Released: February 14, 2015
- Genre: Alternative R&B; synth pop
- Length: 31:51
- Label: Beartrap
- Producer: Blackbear; Kizzo; Pettro; Nic Nac; Ben Harrison; Frequency; J. Hill; Basecamp; Mod Sun; DJ That; The Fakulty

Blackbear chronology
The Afterglow (2014)	Deadroses (2015)	Dead (2015)

Singles from Deadroses
- 1. "Idfc" Released: October 16, 2014; 2. "4U" Released: January 7, 2015; 3. "Dirty Laundry" Released: February 4, 2015

Deadroses (stylized in all lowercase) is the debut studio album by American singer Blackbear. It was released on February 14, 2015, as the first release by his independent record label Beartrap following the EP The Afterglow. The album includes guest appearances from G-Eazy and Devon Baldwin. It was preceded by the singles "Idfc", "4U", and "Dirty Laundry". The title track "Deadroses" was released as a promotional single. A deluxe edition of the album including the EP Dead, containing acoustic tracks from Deadroses, was sold as a limited edition two-disc set during 2015 and 2016.

The album peaked at 37 on the Billboard Top R&B/Hip-Hop Albums chart and was certified gold by the RIAA on June 30, 2022.

== Track listing ==
Deadroses track listing
No.	Title	Writer(s)	Producer(s)	Length
1.	"4U"	Matthew Musto; Tearce Kizzo	Kizzo	2:38
2.	"I Needed You"	Musto	Pettro	2:56
3.	"Ain't Trippin"	Musto	Nic Nac	3:05
4.	"90210" (featuring G-Eazy)	Musto; Gerald Gillum; Bryan Fryzel; Ben Harrison	Harrison; Frequency	3:43
5.	"Ain't Love"	Musto	J. Hill	3:12
6.	"Idfc"	Musto	Blackbear	4:05
7.	"Waste Away" (featuring Devon Baldwin)	Musto; Baldwin	Basecamp	3:05
8.	"Dirty Laundry"	Musto	Blackbear	2:45
9.	"My Heart Is Lost"	Musto	Mod Sun; DJ That	3:18
10.	"Deadroses"	Musto; Brett Somers; Gene Rayburn	The Fakulty	3:04
Total length:				31:51

- All song titles are stylized in lowercase letters.
- "Deadroses" samples an episode of Match Game aired in 1975.

== Charts ==
Chart (2015)	Peak position
US Top R&B/Hip-Hop Albums (Billboard)	37
US Heatseekers Albums (Billboard)	4
US Independent Albums (Billboard)	20

== Certifications ==
Region	Certification	Certified units/sales
New Zealand (RMNZ)	Gold	7,500^{‡}
United States (RIAA)	Gold	500,000^{‡}
^{‡} Sales+streaming figures based on certification alone.
