= Middle (song) =

Single by DJ Snake featuring Bipolar Sunshine

from the album Encore
- Released: 16 October 2015
- Recorded: 2015
- Genre: EDM; bass
- Length: 3:40
- Label: Interscope
- Songwriters: William Grigahcine; Aaron Kleinstub; Adio Marchant
- Producers: DJ Snake; Aalias

DJ Snake singles chronology
"Lean On" (2015)	"Middle" (2015)	"Talk" (2016)

Bipolar Sunshine singles chronology
"Daydreamer" (2015)	"Middle" (2015)	"Whole Heart" (2016)

Music video
- "Middle" on YouTube

"Middle" is a song by French DJ and record producer DJ Snake featuring vocals from British singer Bipolar Sunshine. The song was released as a single on 16 October 2015 by Interscope Records. In July 2016, the song was announced as the lead single from DJ Snake's debut album, Encore (2016).

It was written by William Grigahcine, Aaron Kleinstub and Adio Marchant, and produced by the latter of two.

== Critical reception ==
The song received positive reviews from music critics. Entertainment Weekly writer Chuck Arnold called it a "breezy twirler that achieves after-hours airiness." Ed Ledsham of Drowned in Sound put it alongside "Talk" for their "finer qualities of contemporary pop-dance" and the vocal talents of their respective featured artists, noting how Bipolar Sunshine's delivery was "particularly unique."

== Music video ==
The song's accompanying music video premiered on March 16, 2016, on DJ Snake's YouTube account on Vevo.

It was directed by Colin Tilley and features The Hunger Games actor Josh Hutcherson and actress Kiersey Clemons. Principal photography took place in the San Pedro neighborhood of Los Angeles, California.

== Charts ==
=== Weekly charts ===
Chart (2015–2016)	Peak position
Australia (ARIA)	5
Austria (Ö3 Austria Top 40)	48
Belgium (Ultratop 50 Flanders)	29
Belgium (Ultratop 50 Wallonia)	8
Canada Hot 100 (Billboard)	20
Czech Republic Airplay (ČNS IFPI)	18
France (SNEP)	12
Germany (GfK)	49
Hungary (Stream Top 40)	23
Ireland (IRMA)	17
Italy (FIMI)	42
Netherlands (Single Top 100)	41
New Zealand (Recorded Music NZ)	13
Portugal (AFP)	22
South Africa Airplay (EMA)	4
Spain (Promusicae)	62
Sweden (Sverigetopplistan)	37
Switzerland (Schweizer Hitparade)	42
UK Dance (Official Charts)	6
UK Singles (Official Charts)	10
US Billboard Hot 100	20
US Hot Dance/Electronic Songs (Billboard)	3
US Dance Club Songs (Billboard)	33
US Pop Airplay (Billboard)	13
US Rhythmic Airplay (Billboard)	13

=== Year-end charts ===
Chart (2015)	Position
US Hot Dance/Electronic Songs (Billboard)	98
Chart (2016)	Position
Australia (ARIA)	56
Belgium (Ultratop Flanders)	85
Belgium (Ultratop Wallonia)	28
Canada (Canadian Hot 100)	48
France (SNEP)	28
Netherlands (Single Top 100)	93
New Zealand (Recorded Music NZ)	26
Switzerland (Schweizer Hitparade)	81
UK Singles (OCC)	47
US Billboard Hot 100	80
US Hot Dance/Electronic Songs (Billboard)	9
US Mainstream Top 40 (Billboard)	49

=== Decade-end charts ===
Chart (2010–2019)	Position
US Hot Dance/Electronic Songs (Billboard)	26

== Certifications ==
Region	Certification	Certified units/sales
Australia (ARIA)	6× Platinum	420,000^{‡}
Austria (IFPI Austria)	Gold	15,000^{‡}
Belgium (BRMA)	Platinum	20,000^{‡}
Brazil (Pro-Música Brasil)	3× Platinum	180,000^{‡}
Canada (Music Canada)	5× Platinum	400,000^{‡}
Denmark (IFPI Danmark)	Gold	45,000^{‡}
France (SNEP)	Platinum	133,333^{‡}
Germany (BVMI)	Gold	200,000^{‡}
Italy (FIMI)	Platinum	50,000^{‡}
Mexico (AMPROFON)	Gold	30,000^{*}
New Zealand (RMNZ)	4× Platinum	120,000^{‡}
Poland (ZPAV)	Gold	25,000^{‡}
Portugal (AFP)	Platinum	20,000^{‡}
Spain (Promusicae)	Gold	20,000^{‡}
Sweden (GLF)	2× Platinum	80,000^{‡}
United Kingdom (BPI)	Platinum	600,000^{‡}
United States (RIAA)	3× Platinum	3,000,000^{‡}
^{*} Sales figures based on certification alone.^{‡} Sales+streaming figures based on certification alone.
