= Let Me Love You (DJ Snake song) =

2016 single by DJ Snake featuring Justin Bieber

Single by DJ Snake featuring Justin Bieber

from the album Encore
- Released: 5 August 2016
- Recorded: April 2016
- Studio: Studio 713 (Houston, Texas)
- Genre: EDM; tropical house
- Length: 3:25
- Label: Interscope
- Songwriters: William Grigahcine; Justin Bieber; Andrew Watt; Ali Tamposi; Brian Lee; Louis Bell
- Producers: DJ Snake; Andrew Watt; Louis Bell

DJ Snake singles chronology
"Talk" (2016)	"Let Me Love You" (2016)	"The Half" (2017)

Justin Bieber singles chronology
"Cold Water" (2016)	"Let Me Love You" (2016)	"Deja Vu" (2016)

Music video
- "Let Me Love You" on YouTube

"Let Me Love You" is a song recorded by French DJ and record producer DJ Snake featuring vocals from Canadian singer Justin Bieber. The song was released through Interscope Records on 5 August 2016 as the third single from his debut studio album, Encore (2016). The artists both co-wrote the song along with Andrew Watt, Ali Tamposi, Brian Lee and Louis Bell, while the song's production was handled by DJ Snake, Bell and Watt. The song was originally recorded by Selena Gomez, although this version of the song is a demo.

Its music video, directed by James Lees, was released on 29 November 2016 on YouTube. The song became popular among teenagers and young adults in 2017. It also won the Radio Disney Music Award for Best Crush Song at the 2017 Radio Disney Music Awards.

Official remixes were released by Tiësto in November 2016 (Tiësto AFTR:HRS remix) and by R. Kelly in January 2017.

== Composition ==
"Let Me Love You" is written in the key of C minor with a tempo of 100 beats per minute common time. The song follows a chord progression of Cm7 – E♭ – E♭/G – A♭ – E♭/G – A♭ and Bieber's vocal range spans from C4 to B♭5.

== Music video ==
The music video for "Let Me Love You" was released on 29 November 2016 on YouTube. Rolling Stone magazine referred to the video as "Bonnie and Clyde with a twist" as it shows a few scenes with an outlaw couple (played by Tommy O'Brien and Emily Rudd) engaging in a high speed chase, a run in with a mob boss and kissing in their getaway car and in their motel room. In the end, it is revealed that the action sequences are part of a video game and the players on the other side are in fact a kid and an unkempt and overweight adult male with virtual reality devices on. The video was directed by James Lees. On Tuesday, 12th May 2026, the music video officially hit 2 billion views on YouTube.

== Chart performance ==
In the United States, "Let Me Love You" debuted at number 12 on the Billboard Hot 100 on the issue dated 27 August 2016. The single opened at number-one on Digital Songs with 113,000 downloads, becoming DJ Snake's first and Bieber's sixth number-one on the chart. On the issue dated 1 October 2016, "Let Me Love You" advanced at sixth place, becoming DJ Snake's third top 10 single in the Hot 100 after "Turn Down for What" and "Lean On" with Major Lazer and Bieber's twelfth top 10 single. It eventually reached number four the following week.

In addition, the song reached number one in Finland, France, Germany, Italy, the Netherlands, Norway, Portugal, Scotland and Switzerland; as well as the top 10 in Argentina, Australia, Austria, Belgium, Brazil, Canada, Denmark, Hungary, Ireland, Lebanon, New Zealand, Panama, Paraguay, Poland, Spain, Sweden, the United Kingdom and the United States.

The remix of the song with the collaboration of American R&B singer R. Kelly debuted at number 24 on the Bubbling Under Hot 100 on the issue dated 14 January 2017. The remix opened at number 11 on Hot Dance/Electronic Songs with 25,000 downloads.

The remix also appeared on archived digital charts, including the World Chart Top 200 Digital (#81) and Uganda Top 100 Digital (#9), although these listings were published by Charts Around The World rather than by official national chart providers.

On April 28, 2026 “Let Me Love You” hit 3 billion streams on Spotify.

== Covers ==
In 2016, Fitz and the Tantrums covered the song acoustically for Spotify Singles.

On 23 July 2021, Christian nu metal band Love and Death covered the song for their album Perfectly Preserved. Flyleaf vocalist Lacey Sturm performs guest vocals on the song.

On 1 October 2022, Fastball released their cover of the song exclusively on their Patreon website.

== Charts ==
=== Weekly charts ===
==== Original version ====
Chart (2016–2018)	Peak position
Argentina Airplay (Monitor Latino)	4
Australia (ARIA)	2
Austria (Ö3 Austria Top 40)	4
Belgium (Ultratop 50 Flanders)	6
Belgium (Ultratop 50 Wallonia)	2
Brazil Hot 100 Airplay (Billboard)	4
Bulgaria Airplay (PROPHON)	8
Canada Hot 100 (Billboard)	4
Canada AC (Billboard)	4
Canada CHR/Top 40 (Billboard)	2
Canada Hot AC (Billboard)	5
Colombia Anglo Airplay (Monitor Latino)	1
CIS Airplay (TopHit)	3
Croatia International Airplay (Top lista)	4
Czech Republic Airplay (ČNS IFPI)	2
Czech Republic Singles Digital (ČNS IFPI)	1
Denmark (Tracklisten)	3
Dominican Republic Anglo Airplay (Monitor Latino)	1
Ecuador Anglo Airplay (Monitor Latino)	1
Finland (Suomen virallinen lista)	1
France (SNEP)	1
Germany (GfK)	1
Greece Airplay (IFPI)	14
Greece Digital Song Sales (Billboard)	2
Guatemala Airplay (Monitor Latino)	3
Hungary (Dance Top 40)	15
Hungary (Rádiós Top 40)	3
Hungary (Single Top 40)	3
Ireland (IRMA)	2
Israel International Airplay (Media Forest)	3
Italy (FIMI)	1
Japan Hot 100 (Billboard)	92
Latvia (Latvijas Top 40)	7
Lebanon (Lebanese Top 20)	3
Luxembourg Digital Song Sales (Billboard)	2
Malaysia (RIM)	16
Mexico Airplay (Billboard)	1
Netherlands (Dutch Top 40)	1
Netherlands (Single Top 100)	1
New Zealand (Recorded Music NZ)	3
Norway (VG-lista)	1
Panama Airplay (Monitor Latino)	9
Paraguay Airplay (Monitor Latino)	9
Peru Anglo Airplay (Monitor Latino)	10
Philippines Hot 100 (Billboard Philippines)	72
Poland Airplay (ZPAV)	2
Portugal (AFP)	1
Romania Airplay 100 (Media Forest)	53
Russia Airplay (TopHit)	1
Scottish Singles Sales (Official Charts)	1
Slovakia Airplay (ČNS IFPI)	6
Slovakia Singles Digital (ČNS IFPI)	1
Slovenia Airplay (SloTop50)	2
Spain (Promusicae)	2
Sweden (Sverigetopplistan)	2
Switzerland (Schweizer Hitparade)	1
Ukraine Airplay (TopHit)	16
UK Singles (Official Charts)	2
UK Dance (Official Charts)	2
Uruguay Airplay (Monitor Latino)	12
US Billboard Hot 100	4
US Adult Contemporary (Billboard)	6
US Adult Pop Airplay (Billboard)	4
US Dance Club Songs (Billboard)	19
US Hot Dance/Electronic Songs (Billboard)	2
US Pop Airplay (Billboard)	2
US Rhythmic Airplay (Billboard)	4
Venezuela Anglo Airplay (Monitor Latino)	1

Chart (2021)	Peak position
Portugal Airplay (AFP)	76

Chart (2023–2026)	Peak position
France (SNEP)	177
Global 200 (Billboard)	55
Kazakhstan Airplay (TopHit)	99
Moldova Airplay (TopHit)	66
Panama Streaming (PRODUCE)	103
Romania Airplay (TopHit)	154
Singapore Regional (RIAS)	23
UK Dance (Official Charts)	22

==== Remix featuring R. Kelly ====
Chart (2017)	Peak position
US Bubbling Under Hot 100 (Billboard)	24
US Bubbling Under R&B/Hip-Hop Singles (Billboard)	10
US Hot Dance/Electronic Songs (Billboard)	11

=== Monthly charts ===
Monthly chart performance
Chart (2026)	Peak position
Panama Streaming (PRODUCE)	176

=== Year-end charts ===
Chart (2016)	Position
Argentina (Monitor Latino)	28
Australia (ARIA)	19
Austria (Ö3 Austria Top 40)	24
Belgium (Ultratop Flanders)	35
Belgium (Ultratop Wallonia)	27
Brazil (Brasil Hot 100 Airplay)	13
Canada (Canadian Hot 100)	31
CIS (Tophit)	55
Denmark (Tracklisten)	28
France (SNEP)	21
Germany (Official German Charts)	16
Hungary (Dance Top 40)	58
Hungary (Single Top 40)	14
Iceland (Plötutíóindi)	11
Italy (FIMI)	20
Netherlands (Dutch Top 40)	4
Netherlands (Single Top 100)	19
New Zealand (Recorded Music NZ)	23
Poland (ZPAV)	46
Russia Airplay (Tophit)	53
Spain (PROMUSICAE)	41
Sweden (Sverigetopplistan)	15
Switzerland (Schweizer Hitparade)	25
UK Singles (Official Charts Company)	25
US Billboard Hot 100	47
US Hot Dance/Electronic Songs (Billboard)	7
US Mainstream Top 40 (Billboard)	31
Chart (2017)	Position
Argentina (Monitor Latino)	51
Belgium (Ultratop Wallonia)	52
Brazil (Pro-Música Brasil)	61
Canada (Canadian Hot 100)	41
Denmark (Tracklisten)	74
France (SNEP)	58
Hungary (Dance Top 40)	32
Hungary (Rádiós Top 40)	28
Hungary (Single Top 40)	81
Hungary (Stream Top 40)	68
Italy (FIMI)	51
Latvia Airplay (LaIPA)	99
Netherlands (Single Top 100)	78
Panama (Monitor Latino)	26
Poland (ZPAV)	87
Portugal (AFP)	74
Spain (PROMUSICAE)	78
Sweden (Sverigetopplistan)	91
Switzerland (Schweizer Hitparade)	54
US Billboard Hot 100	46
US Adult Contemporary (Billboard)	9
US Adult Top 40 (Billboard)	26
US Hot Dance/Electronic Songs (Billboard)	5
US Mainstream Top 40 (Billboard)	36
Chart (2018)	Position
Hungary (Rádiós Top 40)	78

=== Decade-end charts ===
Chart (2010–2019)	Position
US Hot Dance/Electronic Songs (Billboard)	22

== Certifications ==
Region	Certification	Certified units/sales
Australia (ARIA)	10× Platinum	700,000^{‡}
Austria (IFPI Austria)	Platinum	30,000^{‡}
Belgium (BRMA)	2× Platinum	40,000^{‡}
Brazil (Pro-Música Brasil)	3× Diamond	750,000^{‡}
Canada (Music Canada)	Diamond	800,000^{‡}
Denmark (IFPI Danmark) Tiësto AFTR:HRS Remix	4× Platinum	360,000^{‡}
France (SNEP)	Diamond	233,333^{‡}
Germany (BVMI)	Diamond	1,000,000^{‡}
Italy (FIMI)	6× Platinum	300,000^{‡}
Mexico (AMPROFON)	9× Diamond	2,700,000^{‡}
New Zealand (RMNZ)	7× Platinum	210,000^{‡}
Norway (IFPI Norway)	4× Platinum	240,000^{‡}
Poland (ZPAV)	Diamond	100,000^{‡}
Portugal (AFP)	5× Platinum	125,000^{‡}
Spain (Promusicae)	3× Platinum	120,000^{‡}
Sweden (GLF)	5× Platinum	200,000^{‡}
United Kingdom (BPI)	4× Platinum	2,400,000^{‡}
United States (RIAA)	6× Platinum	6,000,000^{‡}
Streaming
Greece (IFPI Greece)	Platinum	2,000,000^{†}
Japan (RIAJ)	Gold	50,000,000^{†}
^{‡} Sales+streaming figures based on certification alone.^{†} Streaming-only figures based on certification alone.

== See also ==
- List of highest-certified singles in Australia
