= The Lumineers (album) =

2012 studio album by the Lumineers

Studio album by the Lumineers
- Released: April 3, 2012
- Recorded: 2011
- Studio: Bear Creek Studios
- Genres: Americana; folk rock; indie folk
- Length: 42:16
- Label: Dualtone
- Producer: Ryan Hadlock

The Lumineers chronology
The Lumineers (EP) (2011)	The Lumineers (2012)	Winter (2012)

Singles from The Lumineers
- 1. "Ho Hey" Released: June 4, 2012; 2. "Stubborn Love" Released: October 3, 2012; 3. "Submarines" Released: July 30, 2013

The Lumineers is the debut studio album by the American folk rock band the Lumineers. The album was released in the United States on April 3, 2012, and contains the singles "Ho Hey", "Stubborn Love" and "Submarines". The album peaked at number 2 on the Billboard 200.

The vinyl LP version of the record was pressed by United Record Pressing in Nashville, Tennessee.

== Reception ==
=== Commercial performance ===
The Lumineers debuted on the US Billboard 200 at number 45 on its week of release with sales of 10,000. The success of the song "Ho Hey" however began to drive sales of the album, and it eventually reached a peak of number 2 on the Billboard 200. The album sold 1,700,000 copies in the US as of April 2016.

The album debuted and peaked at number 8 on the UK Albums Chart. It sold 421,177 copies in the UK as of April 2016.

=== Critical reception ===
Professional ratings
Aggregate scores
Source	Rating
Metacritic	73/100
Review scores
Source	Rating
AllMusic	3.5/5 stars
The Austin Chronicle	4/5 stars
Digital Spy	4/5 stars
The Guardian	2/5 stars
Irish Times	4/5 stars
The New Zealand Herald	4/5 stars
The Observer	3/5 stars
Paste	8.6/10
Rolling Stone	3/5 stars
Uncut	7/10

The Lumineers received generally positive reviews from music critics. At Metacritic, which assigns a normalized rating out of 100 to reviews from mainstream critics, the album received an average score of 73, based on 9 reviews, which indicates "generally favorable reviews". The album garnered both positive and mixed ratings from critics. To this, the positive reviews are from AllMusic, The Austin Chronicle, Digital Spy, Irish Times, The New Zealand Herald, Paste and Uncut magazine. On the other hand, the mixed reviews came from The Guardian, The Observer and Rolling Stone magazine.

Steve Leggett of AllMusic believed that "each track is inventive". To this, Joe Breen of the Irish Times said the music needs to be communal because it is essential to the collective and joint mission between the band and the fans, which is "underlined by elemental instrumentation – guitar, cello and drums; in the manner in which songs of call and response become sites of collaboration and celebration; in the vernacularity of the thoughtful lyrics." Lydia Jenkin of The New Zealand Herald said that the music is enjoyable, but the music is even more so entertaining "live (when they rope in further players to help fill out the many layers of piano, drums, percussion, and guitars)." Alexandra Fletcher of Paste proclaimed that the "record is instantly gratifying—and not in the hasty, shallow way often found in pre-fab pop songs either."

Melanie Haupt of The Austin Chronicle found the release to be "uniquely American in all the best ways: gritty, determined, soaked in sweat and love and drive." Similarly, Graeme Thomson of Uncut called it "primal, pounding folk music", and he found that it was facilitated with a subdued amount of "drama." Lastly, Thomson proclaimed that "Nothing is overcooked," which means the sound can readily and "easily [be] recreated by the band on some makeshift stage." Conversely, Phil Mongredien of The Observer faulted the album because the "songs float prettily", which does not create an impression because the band produced "gossamer-light and gossamer-memorable" music. In agreement, Will Hermes of Rolling Stone told that the music here "basically argues that a bunch of Americans can lead slowly-accelerating lovelorn singalongs just as well as UK yankophile Marcus Mumford, bringing fiddle scratching, marching-band snare rolls, parlor-room piano chords, and Kingston Trio guitar strumming to an album that's long on nostalgic reverie." But, Robert Copsey of Digital Spy vowed that "they've still got plenty more to get off their chest", so this album gives them the potential to get that done.

== Artwork ==
According to Wesley Schultz, the album's cover art is a childhood photograph of Schultz's mother Judy and her mother, Schultz's grandmother.

== Track listing ==
=== Original release ===
All tracks are written by Jeremiah Fraites and Wesley Schultz, except where noted.

The Lumineers standard edition
No.	Title	Writer(s)	Producer(s)	Length
1.	"Flowers in Your Hair"		Ryan Hadlock	1:50
2.	"Classy Girls"		Hadlock	2:45
3.	"Submarines"		Hadlock	2:43
4.	"Dead Sea"		Hadlock	4:07
5.	"Ho Hey"		Hadlock	2:43
6.	"Slow It Down"		Hadlock	5:07
7.	"Stubborn Love"		Hadlock	4:39
8.	"Big Parade"		Hadlock	5:27
9.	"Charlie Boy"	Fraites; Schultz; Maxwell Hughes	Hadlock	4:21
10.	"Flapper Girl"		Hadlock	3:15
11.	"Morning Song"	Fraites; Schultz; Hughes	Hadlock	5:16
Total length:				42:16

=== Deluxe edition ===
Disc 2
No.	Title	Writer(s)	Producer(s)	Length
12.	"Ain't Nobody's Problem"	Sawmill Joe	The Lumineers	4:56
13.	"This Must Be the Place (Naïve Melody)"	Chris Frantz; David Byrne; Jerry Harrison; Tina Weymouth	Fraites; Schultz	3:50
14.	"Elouise"		Fraites; Schultz	2:27
15.	"Darlene"		Fraites; Schultz	2:59
16.	"Slow It Down" (live)		Sean Clark; Jace Freeman	4:39
Total length:				61:00

== Personnel ==
The Lumineers

- Wesley Schultz – vocals, guitar, keyboards, percussion, ukulele, effects
- Jeremiah Fraites – vocals, drums, percussion, keyboards, guitar, mandolin
- Neyla Pekarek – vocals, cello, keyboards, mandolin, accordion, percussion
- Stelth Ulvang – keyboards, guitar, accordion, mandolin, bouzouki, vocals
- Ben Wahamaki – electric bass, vocals

Additional musicians

- Adam Trachsel – electric bass, upright bass
- Lauren Jacobson – violin
- All the Lumineers and their Friends – group vocals, stomps, handclaps

== Charts ==
=== Weekly charts ===
Chart (2012–13)	Peak position
Australian Albums (ARIA)	7
Austrian Albums (Ö3 Austria)	24
Belgian Albums (Ultratop Flanders)	41
Belgian Albums (Ultratop Wallonia)	54
Canadian Albums (Billboard)	2
Danish Albums (Hitlisten)	28
Dutch Albums (Album Top 100)	6
French Albums (SNEP)	19
German Albums (Offizielle Top 100)	17
Irish Albums (IRMA)	3
Italian Albums (FIMI)	24
New Zealand Albums (RMNZ)	14
Norwegian Albums (VG-lista)	18
Portuguese Albums (AFP)	19
Scottish Albums (Official Charts)	8
South African Albums Chart	20
Spanish Albums (Promusicae)	21
Swedish Albums (Sverigetopplistan)	27
Swiss Albums (Schweizer Hitparade)	20
UK Albums (Official Charts)	8
US Billboard 200	2
US Top Alternative Albums (Billboard)	1
US Americana/Folk Albums (Billboard)	1
US Independent Albums (Billboard)	1
US Top Rock Albums (Billboard)	1

=== Year-end charts ===
Chart (2012)	Position
UK Albums (OCC)	83
US Billboard 200	59
US Top Rock Albums (Billboard)	15

Chart (2013)	Position
Australian Albums (ARIA)	41
Belgian Albums (Ultratop Flanders)	118
Belgian Albums (Ultratop Wallonia)	179
Canadian Albums (Billboard)	6
Dutch Albums (Album Top 100)	74
French Albums (SNEP)	86
Swiss Albums (Schweizer Hitparade)	54
UK Albums (OCC)	31
US Billboard 200	13
US Folk Albums (Billboard)	2
US Top Rock Albums (Billboard)	3

Chart (2014)	Position
US Billboard 200	192

=== Decade-end charts ===
Chart (2010–2019)	Position
US Billboard 200	55

== Certifications ==
Region	Certification	Certified units/sales
Australia (ARIA)	Platinum	70,000^{^}
Canada (Music Canada)	5× Platinum	400,000^{‡}
Denmark (IFPI Danmark)	Platinum	20,000^{‡}
France (SNEP)	Gold	50,000^{*}
Germany (BVMI)	Gold	100,000^{‡}
Ireland (IRMA)	Platinum	15,000^{^}
Italy (FIMI)	Gold	25,000^{‡}
New Zealand (RMNZ)	Platinum	15,000^{‡}
Sweden (GLF)	Gold	20,000^{‡}
United Kingdom (BPI)	Platinum	300,000^{*}
United States (RIAA)	4× Platinum	4,000,000^{‡}
^{*} Sales figures based on certification alone.^{^} Shipments figures based on certification alone.^{‡} Sales+streaming figures based on certification alone.

== Release history ==
Release history and formats for The Lumineers
Region	Date	Format	Label
United States	April 3, 2012	CD; digital download; streaming	Dualtone
