= Encore (DJ Snake album) =

Studio album by DJ Snake
- Released: 5 August 2016
- Recorded: 2015–2016
- Genres: EDM; trap
- Length: 52:17
- Label: Interscope
- Producers: DJ Snake (also exec.); Aalias; Smokie Morrison; Andrew Watt; Dan Taylor; Fraser T Smith; Free School; John Ryan; LNY TNZ; Louis Bell; Mike Dean; Moksi; Ricky Reed; Skrillex; DJ Premier; Yellow Claw

DJ Snake chronology
Encore (2016)	Carte Blanche (2019)

Singles from Encore
- 1. "Middle" Released: 16 October 2015; 2. "Propaganda" Released: 19 February 2016; 3. "Talk" Released: 10 June 2016; 4. "Let Me Love You" Released: 5 August 2016; 5. "The Half" Released: 7 February 2017

Encore is the debut studio album by French producer DJ Snake, released on 5 August 2016 by Interscope Records.

It features collaborations with Bipolar Sunshine, Skrillex, Yellow Claw, Justin Bieber, among others. The album garnered mixed reviews from critics. Encore debuted at number 8 on the Billboard 200 and spawned five singles: "Middle", "Propaganda", "Talk", "Let Me Love You" and "The Half".

== Singles ==
On 16 October 2015, Snake premiered the album's lead single, "Middle", which was written by William Grigahcine, Adio Joshua Marchant and Aaron Kleinstub, produced by DJ Snake and Aalias, and features vocals by English singer Bipolar Sunshine. The song was a huge success, reaching the top-twenty in France and the United States, as well as the top-ten and top-five in the United Kingdom and Australia.

Up next, "Propaganda", the second single release, while is not fully charted due to promotional purpose, it featured 10 unique remixes from other artists, placing 2nd for the most remixed song from the album. Which is above "Let Me Love You", but still behind "Ocho Cinco".

"Talk", featuring Australian vocalist George Maple, written by Grigahcine, Jess Higgs, Harley Streten, Alex Burnett, James David, Chris Emerson, and produced by Snake, was released as the third single on 10 June 2016.

The fourth single, "Let Me Love You", featuring Justin Bieber, was released the same day as the album and reached the top-ten in 28 countries, including number four in the United States, number two in the United Kingdom and Australia and number one in many European countries such as France, Germany and Norway.

"The Half", featuring Jeremih, Young Thug and Swizz Beatz, was released on 7 February 2017, as the fifth single off the album. It was written by Grigahcine, Jeremy Felton, Jeffrey Lamar Williams, Kasseem Dean, Brittany Hazzard, and Jean-Baptiste Kouame, and produced by Snake and Free School.

== Critical reception ==
Professional ratings
Aggregate scores
Source	Rating
Metacritic	62/100
Review scores
Source	Rating
Drowned in Sound	7/10
Entertainment Weekly	B+
Pitchfork	5.3/10
Rolling Stone	2.5/5 stars

Encore received generally positive reviews from music critics. At Metacritic, which assigns a normalized rating out of 100 to reviews from mainstream critics, the album received an average score of 62, based on 4 reviews.

Chuck Arnold from Entertainment Weekly praised the album for delivering on "sure-fire singles ("Middle", Sober")" while also displaying Snake's EDM credentials on the more "harder electronic assaults ("Sahara", "Propaganda"), saying that "Encore keeps the party rocking while barely missing a dance step." Ed Ledsham of Drowned in Sound said, "Overall, Encore is a worthwhile listen. It obviously suffers from many of the problems that dance music albums generally suffer from but it does well to show off Snake's ear for hooks just as well as his ear for drops." Will Hermes, writing for Rolling Stone, felt the featured guests were underutilized throughout the track listing, citing "The Half" and "Let Me Love You" as examples. Pitchfork editor Matthew Schnipper said that despite containing some banging earworms ("Sahara", "Ocho Cinco", "Propaganda"), the rest of the record falters when Snake overextends his talent to create a legitimate album filled with "ill-advised rap songs and bad ballads" concluding that, "[T]hey’re inoffensive, sure, but they’re completely unnecessary. Not sure what made him turn down."

== Commercial performance ==
In the United States, Encore debuted at number 8 on the Billboard 200, with 32,000 equivalent album units, marking DJ Snake's first top ten album. The album got over 16.9 million streams in its first week. Encore was DJ Snake's first album to debut at number one on the Billboard Top Dance/Electronic Albums.

== Track listing ==
Encore track listing
No.	Title	Writer(s)	Producer(s)	Length
1.	"Intro (A86)"	William Grigahcine	DJ Snake	1:23
2.	"Middle" (featuring Bipolar Sunshine)	Grigahcine; Adio Joshua Marchant; Aaron Kleinstub	DJ Snake; Aalias	3:40
3.	"Sahara" (featuring Skrillex)	Grigahcine; Sonny Moore	DJ Snake; Skrillex	4:18
4.	"Sober" (featuring JRY)	Grigahcine; John Ryan; Eric Frederic; Ammar Malik; Teddy Geiger; Karl Hyde; Rick Smith	DJ Snake; Ricky Reed; Geiger; Ryan	3:26
5.	"Pigalle" (featuring Moksi)	Grigahcine; Moksi	DJ Snake; Moksi	4:23
6.	"Talk" (featuring George Maple)	Grigahcine; Jess Higgs; Harley Streten; Alex Burnett; James David; Chris Emerson	DJ Snake	3:57
7.	"Ocho Cinco" (featuring Yellow Claw)	Grigahcine; Leonardo Roelandschap; Jim Taihuttu; Nils Rondhuis	DJ Snake; Yellow Claw; LNY TNZ	3:42
8.	"The Half (the 1/2)" (featuring Jeremih, Young Thug and Swizz Beatz)	Grigahcine; Jeremy Felton; Jeffrey Lamar Williams; Kasseem Dean; Brittany Hazzard; Jean-Baptiste Kouame	DJ Snake; Free School	3:37
9.	"Oh Me Oh My" (featuring Travis Scott, Migos and G4SHI)	Grigahcine; Mike Dean; Jacques Webster; Quavious Marshall; Labinot Larry Gashi; Louis Bell	DJ Snake; Dean; Bell	4:16
10.	"Propaganda"	Grigahcine; Marchant; Kleinstub	DJ Snake	4:09
11.	"4 Life" (featuring G4shi)	Grigahcine; Bell; Gashi	DJ Snake; Bell	3:33
12.	"Future, Pt. 2" (with Bipolar Sunshine)	Grigahcine; Sophie Elton; Fraser Thorneycroft-Smith; Karen Poole	DJ Snake; Fraser T Smith	3:42
13.	"Let Me Love You" (featuring Justin Bieber)	Grigahcine; Justin Bieber; Andrew Watt; Ali Tamposi; Brian Lee; Bell	DJ Snake	3:25
14.	"Here Comes the Night" (featuring Mr Hudson)	Grigahcine; Benjamin Hudson McIldowie; Daniel Traynor	DJ Snake; Grades	4:46
Total length:				52:17

Encore – Target bonus tracks
No.	Title	Writer(s)	Length
15.	"True Love"	Grigahcine; Marchant; Kleinstub; Donald Degrate	3:21
16.	"You Know You Like It" (DJ Premier Remix)	Aluna Francis; George Reid	4:07
Total length:			59:52

== Charts ==
=== Weekly charts ===
Chart (2016)	Peak position
Australian Albums (ARIA)	10
Austrian Albums (Ö3 Austria)	42
Belgian Albums (Ultratop Flanders)	22
Belgian Albums (Ultratop Wallonia)	11
Canadian Albums (Billboard)	5
Danish Albums (Hitlisten)	3
Dutch Albums (Album Top 100)	14
Finnish Albums (Suomen virallinen lista)	8
French Albums (SNEP)	4
German Albums (Offizielle Top 100)	73
Irish Albums (IRMA)	76
Italian Albums (FIMI)	95
Japanese Albums (Oricon)	33
Japan Hot Albums (Billboard Japan)	32
South Korean International Albums (Circle)	32
New Zealand Albums (RMNZ)	13
Norwegian Albums (VG-lista)	2
Scottish Albums (Official Charts)	78
Spanish Albums (Promusicae)	59
Swedish Albums (Sverigetopplistan)	6
Swiss Albums (Schweizer Hitparade)	14
Taiwanese Albums (Five Music)	12
UK Albums (Official Charts)	46
UK Dance Albums (Official Charts)	1
US Billboard 200	8
US Top Dance Albums (Billboard)	1
US Digital Albums (Billboard)	12

=== Year-end charts ===
Chart (2016)	Position
Danish Albums (Hitlisten)	34
French Albums (SNEP)	102
Icelandic Albums (Plötutíóindi)	79
Swedish Albums (Sverigetopplistan)	77
US Billboard 200	138
US Top Dance/Electronic Albums (Billboard)	13
Chart (2017)	Position
Danish Albums (Hitlisten)	80
French Albums (SNEP)	172
Swedish Albums (Sverigetopplistan)	85
US Billboard 200	172
US Top Dance/Electronic Albums (Billboard)	5
Chart (2018)	Position
US Top Dance/Electronic Albums (Billboard)	9
Chart (2019)	Position
US Top Dance/Electronic Albums (Billboard)	24

== Certifications ==
Region	Certification	Certified units/sales
Australia (ARIA)	Gold	35,000^{‡}
Brazil (Pro-Música Brasil)	Gold	20,000^{‡}
Denmark (IFPI Danmark)	Platinum	20,000^{‡}
France (SNEP)	Platinum	100,000^{‡}
Mexico (AMPROFON)	2× Diamond+4× Platinum+Gold	870,000^{‡}
New Zealand (RMNZ)	2× Platinum	30,000^{‡}
Poland (ZPAV)	Platinum	20,000^{‡}
Singapore (RIAS)	Platinum	10,000^{*}
United States (RIAA)	Platinum	1,000,000^{‡}
^{*} Sales figures based on certification alone.^{‡} Sales+streaming figures based on certification alone.
