= Talk (DJ Snake song) =

Single by DJ Snake featuring George Maple

from the album Encore
- Released: 2 June 2016
- Recorded: 2015
- Genre: Chill
- Length: 3:58
- Label: Interscope
- Songwriters: William Griachine; Jess Higgs; Harley Streten; Alex Burnett; James David; Chris Emerson
- Producer: DJ Snake

DJ Snake singles chronology
| "Middle" (2015) | "Talk" (2016) | "Let Me Love You" (2016) |

George Maple singles chronology
| "Sticks and Horses" (2016) | "Talk" (2016) |

Music video
- "Talk" on YouTube

"Talk" is a 2016 single by French DJ and record producer DJ Snake, featuring Australian singer George Maple. It was released on 2 June 2016 as the second single from DJ Snake's debut studio album, Encore. DJ Snake had hinted at the possibility of releasing new music via Twitter a few days before the single's release. It features vocals from George Maple's song "Talk Talk" that was released in December 2014. The original George Maple track "Talk Talk" was co-written by Australian songwriter Alexander Burnett, who also receives co-writing credit on the DJ Snake released version.

The 2016 track, which infuses tropical house sounds, was released by Interscope Records and made available for purchase on iTunes on 10 June 2016.

== Music video ==
The music video for the song was released on DJ Snake's YouTube channel on 11 July 2016, with a cameo appearance by Penélope Cruz. DJ Snake does not appear in the video.

The video tells the story of a depressed woman who dances at clubs alone, swings alone, and lives in the junkyard. One day, a group of people bring a blue car (a Volkswagen Golf MK1 Cabriolet) to the junkyard which the woman falls in love with. Interactive scenes include a crane lifting the car from the group and also scenes of the woman dating the car. However, things take a wrong turn when she sees another woman with the car. She beats up the woman and argues with the car until eventually pouring gasoline on it and burning it. Although it seems as if it was a normal car, the video shows scenes of the woman touching the car's headlights, which light up, making it seem as if the car was alive.

== Charts ==
=== Weekly charts ===
| Chart (2016) | Peak position |
|---|---|
| Australia (ARIA) | 57 |
| Belgium (Ultratip Bubbling Under Flanders) | 4 |
| Belgium (Ultratip Bubbling Under Wallonia) | 16 |
| France (SNEP) | 39 |
| UK Singles (OCC) | 131 |
| US Hot Dance/Electronic Songs (Billboard) | 13 |

=== Year-end charts ===
| Chart (2016) | Position |
|---|---|
| US Hot Dance/Electronic Songs (Billboard) | 54 |

== Certifications ==
Certifications for "Talk"
| Region | Certification | Certified units/sales |
|---|---|---|
| Australia (ARIA) | Gold | 35,000^{‡} |
^{‡} Sales+streaming figures based on certification alone.

== Release history ==
| Country | Date | Format | Label | Ref. |
|---|---|---|---|---|
| Worldwide | 2 June 2016 | Digital download | Interscope | |
| United States | 28 June 2016 | Top 40 radio | Interscope | |
