= List of Billboard Mainstream Top 40 number-one songs of 2013 =

This is a list of songs which reached number one on the Billboard Mainstream Top 40 (or Pop Songs) chart in 2013.

During 2013, a total of 16 singles hit number-one on the charts.

== Chart history ==
Key
†	Indicates best-performing single of 2013

Issue date	Song	Artist(s)	Ref.
January 5	"Locked Out of Heaven"	Bruno Mars	
January 12	"Locked Out of Heaven"	Bruno Mars	
January 19	"Locked Out of Heaven"	Bruno Mars	
January 26	"Locked Out of Heaven"	Bruno Mars	
February 2	"I Knew You Were Trouble"	Taylor Swift	
February 9	"I Knew You Were Trouble"	Taylor Swift	
February 16	"I Knew You Were Trouble"	Taylor Swift	
February 23	"I Knew You Were Trouble"	Taylor Swift	
March 2	"I Knew You Were Trouble"	Taylor Swift	
March 9	"I Knew You Were Trouble"	Taylor Swift	
March 16	"I Knew You Were Trouble"	Taylor Swift	
March 23	"Thrift Shop"	Macklemore & Ryan Lewis featuring Wanz	
March 30	"Thrift Shop"	Macklemore & Ryan Lewis featuring Wanz	
April 6	"Daylight"	Maroon 5	
April 13	"When I Was Your Man"	Bruno Mars	
April 20	"When I Was Your Man"	Bruno Mars	
April 27	"When I Was Your Man"	Bruno Mars	
May 4	"Stay"	Rihanna featuring Mikky Ekko	
May 11	"Stay"	Rihanna featuring Mikky Ekko	
May 18	"Just Give Me a Reason"	P!nk featuring Nate Ruess	
May 25	"Just Give Me a Reason"	P!nk featuring Nate Ruess	
June 1	"Mirrors"	Justin Timberlake	
June 8	"Mirrors"	Justin Timberlake	
June 15	"Mirrors"	Justin Timberlake	
June 22	"Can't Hold Us"	Macklemore & Ryan Lewis featuring Ray Dalton	
June 29	"Can't Hold Us"	Macklemore & Ryan Lewis featuring Ray Dalton	
July 6	"Can't Hold Us"	Macklemore & Ryan Lewis featuring Ray Dalton	
July 13	"Can't Hold Us"	Macklemore & Ryan Lewis featuring Ray Dalton	
July 20	"Blurred Lines" †	Robin Thicke featuring T.I. & Pharrell Williams	
July 27	"Blurred Lines" †	Robin Thicke featuring T.I. & Pharrell Williams	
August 3	"Blurred Lines" †	Robin Thicke featuring T.I. & Pharrell Williams	
August 10	"Blurred Lines" †	Robin Thicke featuring T.I. & Pharrell Williams	
August 17	"Blurred Lines" †	Robin Thicke featuring T.I. & Pharrell Williams	
August 24	"Blurred Lines" †	Robin Thicke featuring T.I. & Pharrell Williams	
August 31	"Blurred Lines" †	Robin Thicke featuring T.I. & Pharrell Williams	
September 7	"Blurred Lines" †	Robin Thicke featuring T.I. & Pharrell Williams	
September 14	"Blurred Lines" †	Robin Thicke featuring T.I. & Pharrell Williams	
September 21	"Blurred Lines" †	Robin Thicke featuring T.I. & Pharrell Williams	
September 28	"Roar"	Katy Perry	
October 5	"Roar"	Katy Perry	
October 12	"Roar"	Katy Perry	
October 19	"Roar"	Katy Perry	
October 26	"Roar"	Katy Perry	
November 2	"Royals"	Lorde	
November 9	"Wake Me Up!"	Avicii	
November 16	"Wake Me Up!"	Avicii	
November 23	"Wake Me Up!"	Avicii	
November 30	"Wrecking Ball"	Miley Cyrus	
December 7	"Wrecking Ball"	Miley Cyrus	
December 14	"Demons"	Imagine Dragons	
December 21	"The Monster"	Eminem featuring Rihanna	
December 28	"The Monster"	Eminem featuring Rihanna	

== See also ==
- 2013 in music
