= Aalias =

American music producer and musician

- Born: Aaron Kleinstub; August 20, 1989 (age 37)
- Origin: Cleveland, Ohio, United States
- Genres: Hip hop; R&B; pop
- Years active: 2013–present
- Website: Imprint One80

Aaron Kleinstub (born August 20, 1989), better known by his stage name Aalias, is an American music producer and musician from Cleveland, Ohio.

== Biography ==
Aaron "Aalias" Kleinstub is a songwriter, composer, producer and multi-instrumentalist. As a teenager, he won numerous awards playing jazz trumpet, including the Yamaha Young Performing Artist Award, honorable mention from the National Association for the Advancement of the Arts, a Berklee Music Camp scholarship and a selection to perform in the Grammy Jazz Band at 16. After graduating from Kenston High School in Chagrin Falls, Ohio, Aalias moved to New York to study at Juilliard. He later transferred to Berklee College of Music, where he graduated with a focus in music production.

Aalias is perhaps best known for co-writing and co-producing the #1 hit song "The Monster" by Eminem featuring Rihanna. "The Monster" reached #1 on eight separate Billboard charts, including four weeks at #1 on the Hot 100 and thirteen weeks at #1 on the Hot R&B/Hip-Hop Songs chart. It also topped the charts in twelve countries including Australia, Canada, France, Ireland, New Zealand, Switzerland, and the United Kingdom and won a Grammy for Best/Rap Sung Collaboration. Other notable songs he produced include “Middle” by DJ Snake and “Open Mind” by Wonho.

In 2017, Kleinstub teamed with friend and fellow writer-producer Corey "Latif" Williams to form duo Lo Boii. The band is signed to London-based label AWAL. Its first single "Floor Seats" dropped in April 2019.

== Selected discography ==
Artist	Song	Album (label year)
Lo Boii & Whole Doubts	"Time 2.0"	(Lo Boii 2020)
Lo Boii	"Floor Seats" // "Sweeter" // "Drive" // "Time" // "Chakra" // "Lie to You" // "She Drives Me Crazy"	Sex Doesn't Sell...Anymore (Lo Boii 2019)
Macklemore	"Shadow" feat. IRO	(Bendo 2019)
AWA	"Comfortable"	(Sony 2019)
Yoshi Flower	"Empty"	(Interscope 2019)
Whole Doubts	"Shiver" feat. Jaira Burns	(Whole Doubts 2019)
Whole Doubts	"Spoke Up" feat. Gabi Sklar	(Whole Doubts 2019)
Mallrat	"When I Get My Braces Off"	Driving Music (Nettwerk 2019)
John Splithoff	"Proud"	(Asylum 2019)
John Splithoff	"Like You Talk To Me"	(East West 2019)
The Kite String Tangle	"Give it Time" feat. Aalias	(Warner Music Australia 2018)
Jaira Burns	"Low Key in Love"	(Interscope 2018)
DYLN & Whole Doubts	"Piece of You"	(DYLN 2018)
Eminem	"Revival (Interlude)" feat. Alice and the Glass Lake [Produced with Frequency for Whole Doubts]	Revival (Interscope 2017)
Whole Doubts	"Leave" feat. Kevin Garrett	(Whole Doubts 2017)
Robin Schulz & Aalias	"Fools" feat. IRO	Uncovered (Warner 2017)
John Splithoff	"Show Me" feat. Madison Ryann Ward	Make It Happen (East West 2017)
Janelle Kroll & Aalias	"Blush"	(Lokal Legend 2017)
Sam Bruno	"Hello Hater" & "Tip of My Tongue"	I Am Sam, Pt. 1 (Atlantic 2017)
Bryce Fox	"Coldhearted" [Co-Produced with Frequency]	Heaven on Hold (2017)
DJ Snake	"Middle" [Co-Produced with DJ Snake]	Encore (Interscope 2016)
TOTEM & Aalias	"Bubblegum"	(Totemic Sound 2016)
Ro James	"The Ride"	Eldorado (RCA 2016)
Handsome Ghost	"Eyes Wide" feat. Whole Doubts	The Brilliant Glow (Photo Finish 2016)
Melanie Martinez	"Mad Hatter" [Produced with Frequency]	Cry Baby (Atlantic 2015)
Bebe Rexha	"Gone" [Co-Produced with Frequency; Maki]	(Warner Bros. 2014)
Eminem	"The Monster" feat. Rihanna [Co-Produced with Frequency; Add'l Inst. by Maki]	The Marshall Mathers LP 2 (Interscope 2013)
