= Bipolar Sunshine =

British musician (born 1987)

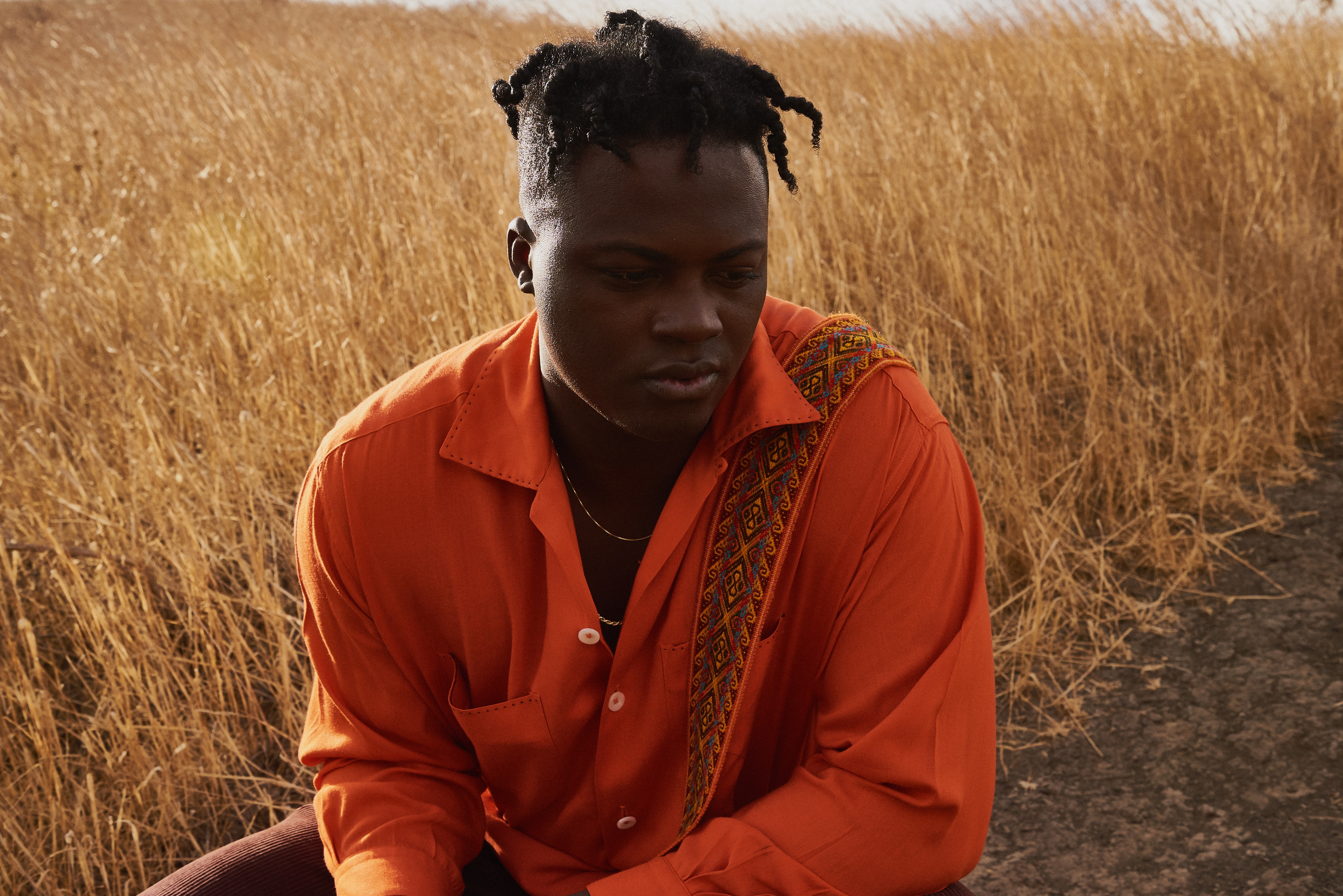
- Bipolar Sunshine in 2017

Background information
- Born: Adio Marchant; 24 September 1987 (age 38); Manchester, England
- Genres: R&B; pop; hip hop; dance; reggae; ska
- Occupations: Singer; songwriter
- Years active: 2007–present
- Labels: The Aesthetic Recordings; Polydor
- Website: bipolarsunshine.com

Adio Marchant (born 24 September 1987), known professionally as Bipolar Sunshine, is a British singer from Manchester, England. Previously the co-vocalist with the band Kid British, he embarked on a solo career in 2013.

== Career ==
Marchant was born and raised in Manchester, the son of Jamaican parents who separated when he was still young. In 2007, he co-founded and contributed vocals in the six-piece Kid British. The band went on to have a moderately successful career and released five EPs between 2009 and 2012 before splitting with a final farewell gig in Manchester in December 2012.

His debut solo EP as Bipolar Sunshine, Aesthetics, was produced/co-written with Jazz Purple and released in June 2013, with the lead track "Rivers" becoming iTunes' "free single of the week". His next EP Drowning Butterflies followed in November 2013 and featured the single "Love More Worry Less".

In 2014, Bipolar Sunshine embarked on A Dream for Dreamer's Tour in the UK, with his London show at XOYO sold out 5 weeks in advance. He released two singles produced by Jazz Purple: "Where Did the Love Go" which was featured on BBC Radio 1's playlist and "Deckchairs on the Moon" which charted at no. 85 in the UK Singles Sales Chart and also no. 93 in the UK Downloads Chart. He appeared at the Blissfields festival and headlined Shepherd's Bush Empire.

His song "Daydreamer" was used in BBC One's 2015 trailer. The track became arguably his most successful single to date, peaking at no. 67 in the UK Downloads Chart and no. 129 in the main UK Singles Chart in February 2015. He supported the Courteeners at their gig at Manchester's Heaton Park and performed at Kendal Calling in July 2015. He contributed vocals on DJ Snake's popular 2016 single "Middle" which was a top 10 hit in the UK.

== Discography ==
=== Albums ===
- The Visionary Tape (with Rabbithole) (2018)
- 3034 (2022)

=== Extended plays ===
- Aesthetics (2013)
- Drowning Butterflies (2013)
- iTunes Festival: London 2013 (2013)
- Spotify Sessions London (2014)
- Night B4 Christmas (2017)
- Imaginarium (2018)

=== Singles ===
==== As lead artist ====
- "Rivers" (2013)
- "Love More Worry Less" (2013)
- "Where Did the Love Go" (2014)
- "Deckchairs on the Moon" (2014)
- "Daydreamer" (2014)
- "Whole Heart" (with Gryffin) (2016)
- "The Scientist" (2017)
- "Are You Happy" (2017)
- "Tears" (2017)
- "Major Love" (2017)
- "Easy to Do" (2018)
- "Pressure" (2018)
- "Pedestal" (2018)
- "Away" (with Niko the Kid) (2019)
- "Mexico" (with KINGDM) (2019)
- "DiCaprio" (with Bantu and Dr. Chaii) (2019)
- "Ex WiFi" (with Chloe Angelides) (2020)
- "Twinkle" (with Earth2Boy and Hiko Momoji) (2020)
- "Tears in the Tate" (with Earth2Boy and Hiko Momoji) (2020)
- "Sola" (with Nina Cobham) (2020)
- "Changes" (with Jake Knox and Chance Peña) (2020)
- "Somebody's Beloved" (with MILCK) (2020)
- "Gone" (2021)
- "Answers" (2021)
- "Lost at Sea (Illa Illa 2)" (with B.I and Afgan) (2021)
- "Cruise n Crash" (2021)
- "Too Young" (2022)
- "Check That List" (with Dark Heart) (2023)
- "Go Off" (with NEZ) (2024)

==== As featured artist ====
List of singles as featured artist, with selected chart positions and certifications, showing year released and album name
Title	Year	Peak chart positions										Certifications	Album
Title	Year	UK	AUS	AUT	BEL (WA)	CAN	FRA	GER	NLD	US	US Dance	Certifications	Album
"Middle" (DJ Snake featuring Bipolar Sunshine)	2015	10	5	48	8	20	12	49	45	20	3	ARIA: 6× Platinum; BPI: Platinum; BVMI: Gold; RIAA: 2× Platinum	Encore
"Fires" (Shadez the Misfit featuring Bipolar Sunshine)	2016	—	—	—	—	—	—	—	—	—	—		Ne Plus Ultra (EP)
"Wake Up" (Petit Biscuit featuring Bipolar Sunshine and Cautious Clay)	2018	—	—	—	—	—	—	—	—	—	—		Presence
"Brighter Days" (San Holo featuring Bipolar Sunshine)	2018	—	—	—	—	—	—	—	—	—	49		Album1
"Circle Up" (Party Favor featuring Bipolar Sunshine)	2018	—	—	—	—	—	—	—	—	—	—		Non-album single
"Gorgeous" (Illenium and Blanke featuring Bipolar Sunshine)	2019	—	—	—	—	—	—	—	—	—	—		Ascend
"Beautiful" (The Avener featuring Bipolar Sunshine)	2019	—	—	—	—	—	128	—	—	—	—		Heaven
"One Night" (Jazz Purple featuring Laura White and Bipolar Sunshine)	2021	—	—	—	—	—	—	—	—	—	—		Non-album single
"Find Your Way" (San Holo featuring Bipolar Sunshine)	2021	—	—	—	—	—	—	—	—	—	—		bb u ok?
"Funny Thing About Love" (BabyJake featuring Bipolar Sunshine)	2021	—	—	—	—	—	—	—	—	—	—		The Sun Wakes Up Earlier Now
"Lose My Mind" (Surf Mesa featuring Bipolar Sunshine)	2021	—	—	—	—	—	—	—	—	—	—		Another Life (EP)
"Don't Be Alarmed" (Devault featuring Bipolar Sunshine)	2021	—	—	—	—	—	—	—	—	—	—		Non-album singles
"Wait" (MILKBLOOD featuring Bipolar Sunshine)	2022	—	—	—	—	—	—	—	—	—	—		Non-album singles
"Leave You Behind" (OTR featuring Bipolar Sunshine)	2023	—	—	—	—	—	—	—	—	—	—		Be Quiet, They're Listening
"Paradise" (DJ Snake featuring Bipolar Sunshine)	2025	—	—	—	9	—	34	—	—	—	—		Nomad
"—" denotes a recording that did not chart or was not released.
