= Ho Hey =

2012 debut single by the Lumineers

Single by the Lumineers

from the album The Lumineers
- Released: June 4, 2012
- Recorded: 2011
- Genre: Folk rock; indie folk
- Length: 2:43 (album version); 2:35 (radio mix)
- Label: Dualtone
- Songwriters: Wesley Schultz; Jeremy Fraites
- Producer: Julius Gatuma

The Lumineers singles chronology
"Ho Hey" (2012)	"Stubborn Love" (2012)

"Ho Hey" is a song by American folk rock band the Lumineers. It was released on June 4, 2012, as the lead single from their self-titled debut studio album (2012). The music video was released on March 11, 2012. "Ho Hey" reached number one for 18 non-consecutive weeks on the Billboard Rock Songs chart, as well as two weeks in the top spot on the Billboard Alternative Songs chart and eight weeks in the top spot on the Adult Pop Songs chart, and reached number 3 on the Billboard Hot 100 chart, becoming their first single to do so, as well as their first top 5 single. It also reached number 2 on the Billboard Mainstream Top 40 chart, behind "Locked Out of Heaven" by Bruno Mars. It is also their first single to be certified in the US.

== Background information ==
The song was originally created during Schultz and Fraites' time in New York as a kiss-off to disinterested concert-goers. "That song was an effort to get under people's skin at shows in Brooklyn, where everyone is pretty indifferent," Schultz told American Songwriter. "And I figured if we could punctuate it with shouts we might get someone's attention."

== Composition ==
"Ho Hey" is written in the key of C major. A McIntosh MC240 amplifier was used in the recording.

== Chart performance ==
The song became a commercial success and was a breakthrough hit for the Lumineers. It debuted on the Billboard Hot 100 at number 90 on the week of June 10, 2012. From there, it became a sleeper hit, slowly ascending the chart until it broke into the top ten in the week of November 10, 2012 at number eight and continued to climb until it reached its peak of number 3 in its 28th week on the chart. It also remained in the top ten of the Billboard Hot 100 for 14 weeks, and topped Billboard's Rock Songs chart for 14 weeks. It has also sold over four million copies in the United States as of April 2013.

The song also became a crossover hit, topping the Adult Pop Songs, Rock Songs, Alternative Songs, and Triple A charts and reaching number two on the Pop Songs chart, topped only by Bruno Mars' "Locked Out of Heaven". It also charted on the Adult Contemporary and Country Airplay charts. This multi-format success allowed it to reach number two on the Hot 100 Airplay chart and stay on the Hot 100 for 62 weeks, one of the longest chart runs ever. On the Billboard Decade-End list on Hot 100 songs in the 2010s, released on November 15, 2019, it was the lowest-ranked song in the top 100 peaking at 100. It was behind number 99, which was "Wrecking Ball" by Miley Cyrus, followed by "In My Feelings" by Drake and "Break Your Heart" by Taio Cruz featuring Ludacris.

The song also had international success, reaching the top ten in the UK, Canada, Ireland, France, Israel, Italy, Slovakia, New Zealand, Australia, and Switzerland.

== Critical reception ==
"Ho Hey" has received positive reviews from critics. Anne Erickson of Audio Ink Radio gave the song a rating of 4 out of 5, favorably comparing Wesley Schultz's lead vocals on the song to Raine Maida. Erickson went on to say that "it's darn refreshing to sit back and take in some genuine, straightforward music that comes from the heart". Rolling Stone named the song the 26th-best song of 2012.

== Music video ==
The music video for "Ho Hey" was released on March 11, 2012. The video was directed by Ben Fee. The video shows the band walking down a hall in the former Linda Vista Hospital while singing and dancing to the song.

== In popular culture ==
- Prior to its release, "Ho Hey" was first featured on the December 5, 2011, episode of Hart of Dixie. Later on, the song was used in a television commercial for Bing on June 1, 2012.
- In the UK, the song has been used in an advertisement for E.ON, in the final episode of sitcom Cuckoo as well as advertisements for the film Silver Linings Playbook.
- A purely instrumental version has been used in a commercial for Blue Moon beer.
- The song appears as a playable track in the video game Guitar Hero Live.
- "Ho Hey" appears in the series premiere episode of the MTV show Catfish, "Sunny & Jamison", which aired on November 12, 2012.
- "Ho Hey" appears in the premiere episode of the eighth season of Bones, "The Future in the Past", which aired September 17, 2012.
- The song appears in the fifth episode of the tenth season of The X-Files, "Babylon", which aired February 15, 2016.
- The song appears in The Vampire Diaries season four episode three "The Rager", introducing the character Hayley Marshall.

== Covers ==
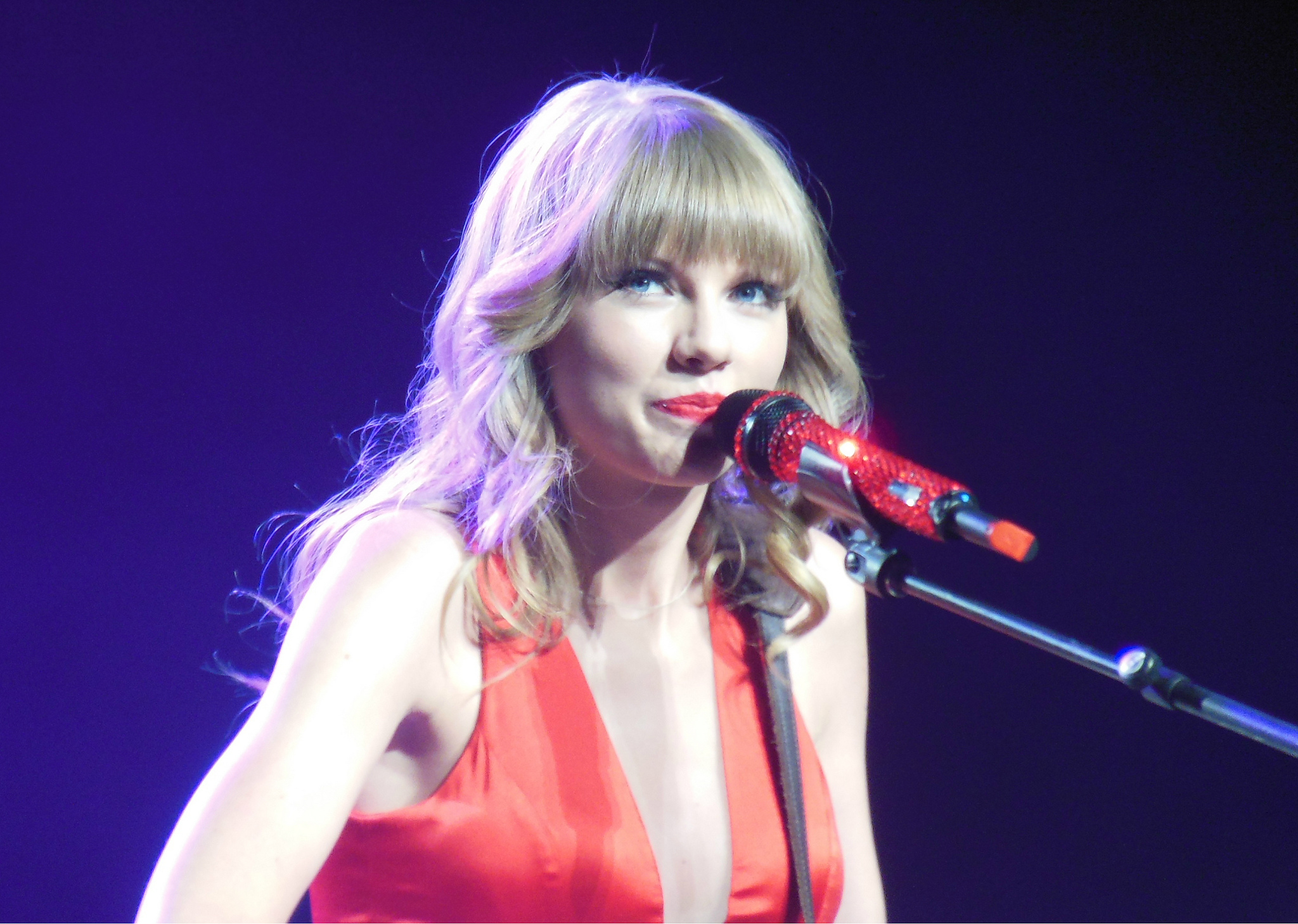
Taylor Swift (pictured) mashed up "Ho Hey" with her own song, "Stay Stay Stay", during her Red Tour.

In the 16th episode of the first season of Nashville, the characters Maddie and Daphne Conrad covered "Ho Hey". This version, credited to the actors' real names Lennon and Maisy Stella, debuted at number 58 on Country Airplay dated for the week of April 27, 2013, and peaked at 47. Blog Taste of Country reviewed their cover positively, saying that "The Stellas redefine the song’s message, turning it into an adorable statement between two sisters."

Taylor Swift covered "Ho Hey" on her 2013–2014 tour, The Red Tour. The song was the only cover that was part of the nightly set list for the entirety of the tour, and was mashed up with Swift's own song, "Stay, Stay, Stay".

== Parodies ==
On Late Night with Jimmy Fallon, an "all-clucking" cover version of the song was performed by an ad hoc group called "the Chickeneers", featuring Jimmy Fallon, Blake Shelton, and Nick Offerman in chicken suits.

== Charts ==
=== Weekly charts ===
Weekly chart performance for "Ho Hey"
Chart (2012–2013)	Peak position
Australia (ARIA)	3
Austria (Ö3 Austria Top 40)	5
Belgium (Ultratop 50 Flanders)	18
Belgium (Ultratop 50 Wallonia)	14
Brazil (Billboard Brasil Hot 100)	40
Brazil Hot Pop Songs	10
Canada Hot 100 (Billboard)	2
Canada Rock (Billboard)	12
Czech Republic Airplay (ČNS IFPI)	3
Denmark (Tracklisten)	22
France (SNEP)	6
Germany (GfK)	5
Hungary (Editors' Choice Top 40)	33
Ireland (IRMA)	2
Israel International Airplay (Media Forest)	6
Italy (FIMI)	5
Japan Hot 100 (Billboard)	76
Luxembourg Digital Songs (Billboard)	8
Netherlands (Dutch Top 40)	5
Netherlands (Single Top 100)	7
New Zealand (Recorded Music NZ)	2
Norway (VG-lista)	16
Poland Airplay (ZPAV)	1
Portugal (Billboard)	1
Scotland Singles (Official Charts)	8
Slovakia Airplay (ČNS IFPI)	2
Slovenia (SloTop50)	24
Spain (Promusicae)	8
Sweden (Sverigetopplistan)	9
Switzerland (Schweizer Hitparade)	7
UK Singles (Official Charts)	8
US Billboard Hot 100	3
US Adult Contemporary (Billboard)	1
US Adult Pop Airplay (Billboard)	1
US Country Airplay (Billboard)	49
US Hot Rock & Alternative Songs (Billboard)	1
US Pop Airplay (Billboard)	2
US Rock & Alternative Airplay (Billboard)	1
Venezuela Pop/Rock General (Record Report)	28

=== Year-end charts ===
Annual chart rankings for "Ho Hey"
Chart (2012)	Position
UK Singles (Official Charts Company)	76
US Billboard Hot 100	68
US Hot Rock Songs (Billboard)	10
US Adult Alternative Songs (Billboard)	4
US Alternative Songs (Billboard)	12

Chart (2013)	Position
Australia (ARIA)	21
Austria (Ö3 Austria Top 40)	31
Belgium (Ultratop Flanders)	57
Belgium (Ultratop Wallonia)	45
Brazil (Crowley)	68
Canada (Canadian Hot 100)	4
France (SNEP)	22
Germany (Media Control AG)	30
Ireland (IRMA)	8
Italy (FIMI)	21
Netherlands (Dutch Top 40)	28
Netherlands (Single Top 100)	44
New Zealand (Recorded Music NZ)	16
Spain (PROMUSICAE)	18
Sweden (Sverigetopplistan)	25
Switzerland (Schweizer Hitparade)	23
UK Singles (Official Charts Company)	21
US Billboard Hot 100	12
US Hot Rock Songs (Billboard)	2
US Adult Contemporary (Billboard)	1
US Adult Top 40 (Billboard)	1
US Alternative Songs (Billboard)	18
US Mainstream Top 40 (Billboard)	15

=== Decade-end charts ===
2010s chart rankings for "Ho Hey"
Chart (2010–19)	Position
US Billboard Hot 100	100
US Hot Rock Songs (Billboard)	5

== Certifications ==
Region	Certification	Certified units/sales
Australia (ARIA)	5× Platinum	350,000^{^}
Belgium (BRMA)	Gold	15,000^{*}
Brazil (Pro-Música Brasil)	Diamond	250,000^{‡}
Canada (Music Canada)	Diamond	800,000^{‡}
Germany (BVMI)	Platinum	300,000^{‡}
Italy (FIMI)	3× Platinum	150,000^{‡}
New Zealand (RMNZ)	7× Platinum	210,000^{‡}
Spain (Promusicae)	2× Platinum	120,000^{‡}
Sweden (GLF)	3× Platinum	120,000^{‡}
Switzerland (IFPI Switzerland)	Platinum	30,000^{^}
United Kingdom (BPI)	5× Platinum	3,000,000^{‡}
United States (RIAA)	Platinum	4,000,000
Streaming
Denmark (IFPI Danmark)	Platinum	1,800,000^{†}
Spain (Promusicae)	Gold	4,000,000^{†}
^{*} Sales figures based on certification alone.^{^} Shipments figures based on certification alone.^{‡} Sales+streaming figures based on certification alone.^{†} Streaming-only figures based on certification alone.

== See also ==
- List of number-one singles of 2013 (Poland)
- List of UK top 10 singles in 2012
- List of Billboard Hot 100 top 10 singles in 2012
- List of number-one Billboard Alternative Songs of 2012
- List of Adult Top 40 number-one songs of the 2010s
- List of Billboard Adult Contemporary number ones of 2013
