= Submarines (The Lumineers song) =

Single by The Lumineers

from the album The Lumineers
- Released: July 30, 2013
- Recorded: 2011
- Genre: Folk rock
- Length: 2:43
- Label: Dualtone
- Songwriter(s): Wesley Schultz, Jeremiah Fraites
- Producer(s): Ryan Hadlock

The Lumineers singles chronology
"Stubborn Love" (2012)	"Submarines" (2013)	"Ophelia" (2016)

"Submarines" is a song by American folk rock band The Lumineers. It impacted modern rock radio in the United States as the third single from their debut studio album The Lumineers (2012).

== Charts ==
Chart (2013)	Peak position
US Hot Rock & Alternative Songs (Billboard)	31
US Alternative Airplay (Billboard)	40
