= List of number-one singles of 2013 (Poland) =

This is a list of the songs that reached number-one position in official Polish single chart in ZPAV in 2013.

== Chart history ==
Issue Date	Song	Artist(s)	Reference(s)
January 5	"Summertime Sadness"	Lana Del Rey	
January 12	"Summertime Sadness"	Lana Del Rey	
January 19	"Locked Out of Heaven"	Bruno Mars	
January 26	"W stronę Słońca"	Ewelina Lisowska	
February 2	"W stronę Słońca"	Ewelina Lisowska	
February 9	"W stronę Słońca"	Ewelina Lisowska	
February 16	"W stronę Słońca"	Ewelina Lisowska	
February 23	"W stronę Słońca"	Ewelina Lisowska	
March 2	"Beneath Your Beautiful"	Labrinth featuring Emeli Sandé	
March 9	"Beneath Your Beautiful"	Labrinth featuring Emeli Sandé	
March 16	"Beneath Your Beautiful"	Labrinth featuring Emeli Sandé	
March 23	"I Could Be the One"	Avicii vs. Nicky Romero	
March 30	"Ho Hey"	The Lumineers	
April 6	"I Could Be the One"	Avicii vs. Nicky Romero	
April 13	"Lili"	Enej	
April 20	"Just Give Me a Reason"	Pink featuring Nate Ruess	
April 27	"One Way or Another (Teenage Kicks)"	One Direction	
May 4	"One Way or Another (Teenage Kicks)"	One Direction	
May 11	"One Way or Another (Teenage Kicks)"	One Direction	
May 18	"One Way or Another (Teenage Kicks)"	One Direction	
May 25	"Mirrors"	Justin Timberlake	
June 1	"Can't Hold Us"	Macklemore and Ryan Lewis featuring Ray Dalton	
June 8	"Can't Hold Us"	Macklemore and Ryan Lewis featuring Ray Dalton	
June 15	"Can't Hold Us"	Macklemore and Ryan Lewis featuring Ray Dalton	
June 22	"Blurred Lines"	Robin Thicke featuring T.I. and Pharrell	
June 29	"Blurred Lines"	Robin Thicke featuring T.I. and Pharrell	
July 6	"Blurred Lines"	Robin Thicke featuring T.I. and Pharrell	
July 13	"Blurred Lines"	Robin Thicke featuring T.I. and Pharrell	
July 20	"Blurred Lines"	Robin Thicke featuring T.I. and Pharrell	
July 27	"Pożyczony"	Sylwia Grzeszczak	
August 3	"Pożyczony"	Sylwia Grzeszczak	
August 10	"Pożyczony"	Sylwia Grzeszczak	
August 17	"Wake Me Up!"	Avicii	
August 24	"Wake Me Up!"	Avicii	
August 31	"Wake Me Up!"	Avicii	
September 7	"Wake Me Up!"	Avicii	
September 14	"Wake Me Up!"	Avicii	
September 21	"Wake Me Up!"	Avicii	
September 28	"Counting Stars"	OneRepublic	
October 5	"Counting Stars"	OneRepublic	
October 12	"Wake Me Up!"	Avicii	
October 19	"Counting Stars"	OneRepublic	
October 26	"Cisza"	Bednarek	
November 2	"Księżniczka"	Sylwia Grzeszczak	
November 9	"You Can't Stop the Beat"	Wally Lopez featuring Jamie Scott	
November 16	"Księżniczka"	Sylwia Grzeszczak	
November 23	"Księżniczka"	Sylwia Grzeszczak	
November 30	"Księżniczka"	Sylwia Grzeszczak	
December 7	"The Monster"	Eminem featuring Rihanna	
December 14	"The Monster"	Eminem featuring Rihanna	
December 21	"The Monster"	Eminem featuring Rihanna	
December 28	"The Monster"	Eminem featuring Rihanna	

== Number-one artists ==
Position	Artist	Weeks at #1
1	Avicii	9
2	Sylwia Grzeszczak	7
3	Ewelina Lisowska	5
3	Robin Thicke	5
3	T.I. (as featuring)	5
3	Pharrell (as featuring)	5
4	One Direction	4
4	Eminem	4
4	Rihanna	4
5	Labrinth	3
5	Emeli Sandé (as featuring)	3
5	Macklemore	3
5	Ryan Lewis	3
5	Ray Dalton (as featuring)	3
5	OneRepublic	3
6	Lana Del Rey	2
6	Nicky Romero (as featuring)	2
7	Bruno Mars	1
7	The Lumineers	1
7	Enej	1
7	Pink	1
7	Nate Ruess (as featuring)	1
7	Justin Timberlake	1
7	Bednarek	1
7	Wally Lopez	1
7	Jamie Scott	1

== See also ==
- Polish Music Charts
- List of number-one albums of 2013 (Poland)
