= Jeff LeBlanc =

American singer-songwriter

- Born: Center Moriches, New York, U.S.
- Genres: Pop, Folk-Rock, R&B
- Occupations: Musician, Songwriter
- Instruments: Guitar, Vocals

Jeff LeBlanc is an American singer, songwriter and guitarist. Originally from Center Moriches, New York, LeBlanc attended Sacred Heart University in Fairfield, Connecticut.

He began performing sometime in 2004, getting his start as a street busker in Westhampton Beach, New York. In 2006, he released his first demo entitled Stories From a Small Town which he wrote and recorded in his Sacred Heart University dorm room.

His first studio EP, Signals, was released in 2009.

His sophomore effort, Worth Holding On To was released in 2011. Both albums found success on the SiriusXM Coffee House channel.

He released his third studio effort, My Own Way There, in 2013.

He followed with Vision, which was successfully backed by fans on Kickstarter and released in 2015.

Billboard premiered his next single, Way You Are, in 2018. He has since released the singles It's About Us in 2019 and When You Need Me in 2022.

He has opened for Boz Scaggs, Chris Stapleton, Gordon Lightfoot, Tori Kelly, Chaka Khan, Michael McDonald, Gavin DeGraw, Chris Isaak, Robert Cray, John Hiatt, Jamie Cullum, Brett Dennen, Lori McKenna and more.
