= Idfc =

Single by blackbear

from the album Deadroses
- Released: October 16, 2014
- Recorded: 2014
- Genre: Alternative R&B
- Length: 4:05
- Label: Beartrap
- Songwriter: Matthew Musto
- Producer: blackbear

Blackbear singles chronology
"N Y L A" (2013)	"Idfc" (2014)	"4U" (2015)

"Idfc" (abbreviation for "I Don't Fucking Care") is a song by American singer blackbear. The song was released on October 16, 2014, as the lead single from his debut studio album, Deadroses (2015). It was written by Blackbear himself. The single was certified Double Platinum by the RIAA in March 2021 and triple platinum in July 2022.

== Charts ==
Chart (2016–17)	Peak position
US Bubbling Under R&B/Hip-Hop Singles (Billboard)	7
US Hot R&B Songs (Billboard)	14

=== Year-end charts ===
Chart (2017)	Position
US Hot R&B Songs (Billboard)	30

== Certifications ==
Region	Certification	Certified units/sales
Brazil (Pro-Música Brasil)	Platinum	60,000^{‡}
Canada (Music Canada)	Platinum	80,000^{‡}
Denmark (IFPI Danmark)	Gold	45,000^{‡}
Italy (FIMI)	Gold	35,000^{‡}
New Zealand (RMNZ)	2× Platinum	60,000^{‡}
Spain (PROMUSICAE)	Gold	30,000^{‡}
United Kingdom (BPI)	Platinum	600,000^{‡}
United States (RIAA)	3× Platinum	3,000,000^{‡}
^{‡} Sales+streaming figures based on certification alone.
