= The Monster (song) =

Single by Eminem featuring Rihanna

from the album The Marshall Mathers LP 2
- Released: October 29, 2013
- Recorded: 2012–2013
- Studio: Effigy Studios (Detroit, MI)
- Genre: Pop rap; rap rock
- Length: 4:10
- Label: Aftermath; Shady; Interscope
- Songwriters: Marshall Mathers; Robyn Fenty; Maki Athanasiou; Bryan Fryzel; Aaron Kleinstub; Jonathan Bellion; Bleta Rexha
- Producers: Frequency; Aalias

Eminem singles chronology
| "Rap God" (2013) | "The Monster" (2013) | "Headlights" (2013) |

Rihanna singles chronology
| "What Now" (2013) | "The Monster" (2013) | "Can't Remember to Forget You" (2014) |

Music video
- "The Monster (Explicit)" on YouTube

Audio sample
- file; help

"The Monster" is a song by American rapper Eminem from his album The Marshall Mathers LP 2 (2013) featuring a guest appearance from Barbadian singer Rihanna. The song was written by Bebe Rexha, Eminem, Rihanna, Aalias, Jon Bellion, Maki Athanasiou, and Frequency, with the latter also handling production. Released on October 29, 2013, as the fourth single from the album, "The Monster" marks the fourth collaboration between Eminem and Rihanna, following "Love the Way You Lie" (2010), its sequel "Love the Way You Lie (Part II)" (2010), and "Numb" (2012), and is a hip-hop and pop song, with lyrics that describe Eminem pondering the negative effects of his fame while Rihanna comes to grips with her inner demons.

Upon release, the song was met with positive reviews from music critics, who compared the song to "Love the Way You Lie". "The Monster" has successfully charted worldwide, topping the charts in twelve countries including Australia, Canada, France, Ireland, New Zealand, Russia, Switzerland, the United Kingdom and the United States' Billboard Hot 100. It also marks Eminem's first number one on the US Hot R&B/Hip-Hop Songs chart and has reached the top ten in Austria, Belgium, Italy and Spain.

== Background and production ==
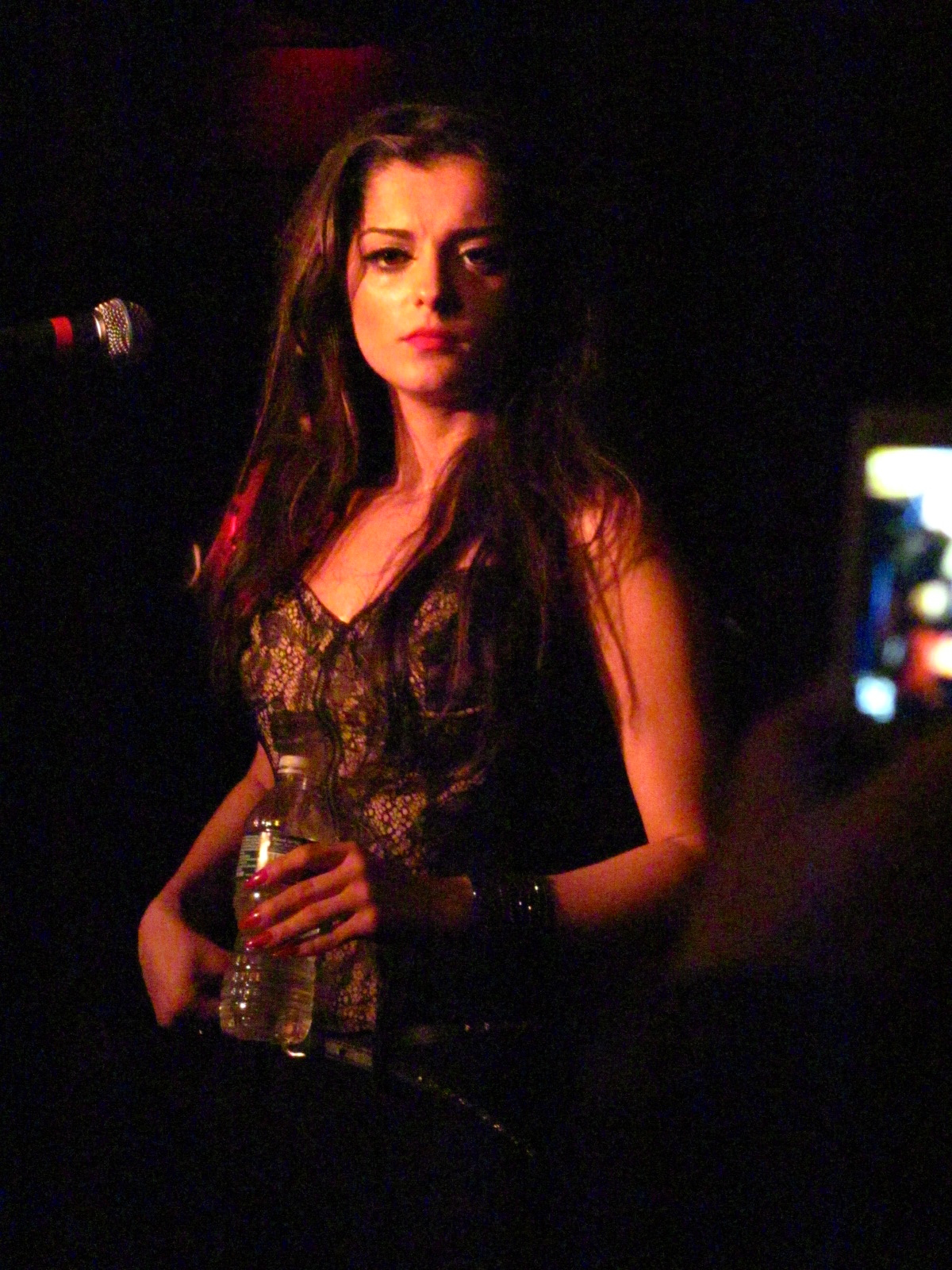
The song, "Monster Under My Bed," written by Bebe Rexha, was originally intended to be used on her own debut album. The chorus was later used for "The Monster"

In 2010, Eminem and Rihanna released their first official collaboration titled "Love the Way You Lie". The song received both critical and commercial success and topped the US Billboard Hot 100 chart for seven consecutive weeks. By the end of the year, 854,000 copies of the song were sold in the UK, making "Love the Way You Lie" the country's biggest-selling song of 2010. The same year, a sequel to the single, titled "Love the Way You Lie (Part II)" was released as part of Rihanna's fifth studio album Loud; it mainly views matters from the female protagonist perspective. In November 2012, Eminem and Rihanna collaborated again on "Numb", which was included on Rihanna's seventh album Unapologetic.

In November 2012, singer Bebe Rexha was at Stadium Red studio in Harlem, New York working on material to be included in her debut album. During the sessions, Rexha stated that she "was in a really dark place, a dark head space. Figuring out where you are in life and trying to make shit work for yourself—it gets to you. You get super down on yourself. I was just trying to get out of a depressed phase." At that moment, she wrote the hook for "The Monster"; in the moment she wrote it she knew that it was going to be a song performed by Eminem. The singer further stated that she got the inspiration from the quote "about the monsters that are around us and that live inside of us"; additionally, Rexha was disappointed at being dropped from the Island Def Jam record label.

The Senior Director of A&R for Shady Records, Riggs Morales started looking for potential songs to be included on Eminem's eighth studio album. When the producer of "The Monster", Frequency, played the song for Morales he "freaked out" and asked for the verses to be stripped and ProTools sessions to be sent to Eminem. When Eminem heard the demo he then added his own verses and adjusted the instrumental portion(s) of the track. However, he left the background vocals sung by Rexha intact. On September 11, 2013, Rihanna wrote on her Twitter account that she had recorded a "#monster" hook for one of her favorite artists. On October 22, Eminem revealed the track listing for his eighth studio album, The Marshall Mathers LP 2, including "The Monster" on which Rihanna was credited as a featured artist. Shortly after premiering the song, Eminem spoke of working with Rihanna again to MTV News: "The perception of the record, what it's saying, I thought it would be a good idea to have her on it because I think people look at us like we're both a little nuts. That's one of the things that I was telling her in making the record: I think that people look at us a little crazy."

== Composition ==
The song runs for 4 minutes and 10 seconds and is set in the key of C-sharp minor in common time, with a chord progression of C#m-B-A, and a tempo of 110 beats per minute. Vocals span from C#4-D#6.

== Critical reception ==
The song was generally well received by critics. Writing for the IBTimes, Tarun Mazumdar reacted positively to it, praising its "memorable lines" and Rihanna's "soulful" vocals and rating it 3.5 out of 5. Amy Sciaretto of PopCrush gave it the same rating and noted that "it's not nearly as powerful or affective as the previous partnership, but it's not supposed to be." Allan Raible of ABC News also enjoyed the song, calling it "a career highlight" and a "personal rhyme about his history." About.com's Bill Lamb had similar thoughts, opining that Eminem's introspection "lends the song engaging power" while also praising Rihanna's vocals. Idolator's Mike Wass noted that while it did not meet the standard of the duo's previous collaboration, the song was still "undeniably catchy and hook-filled enough for top 40 radio success." Keith Murphy of Vibe praised the lyrical content of the song but otherwise found the single lackluster. Jim Farber of The New York Daily News found it inferior to Eminem's previous single, "Rap God" and too similar to "Love the Way You Lie", but appreciated that "at least Em gets off some good lines in the new song." XXL positioned it at number 19 on their list of the best songs of 2013. Atlanta Black Star described the song as sounding "like an old school rap song as it blends genres with Eminem's rap vocals, rock guitars, and Rihanna's pop-style singing of the chorus."

== Commercial performance ==
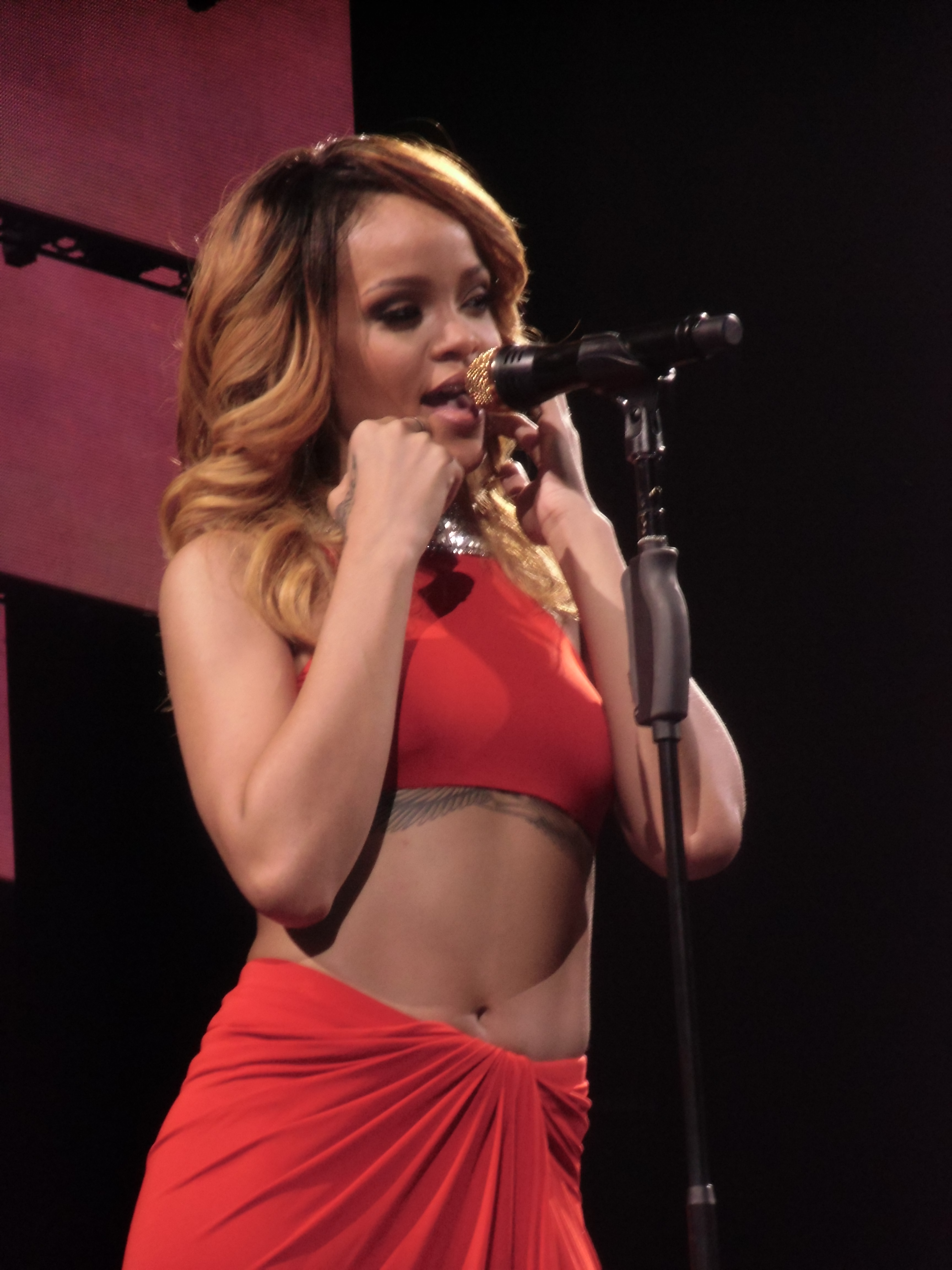
With "The Monster" becoming Rihanna's 13th number one on the Billboard Hot 100, she tied Michael Jackson for the fourth most number ones in the chart's history, as well as becoming the fastest solo artist to accumulate thirteen number ones, surpassing Mariah Carey's record.

"The Monster" first entered the Billboard Hot 100 at number three, on November 6, 2013, marking Eminem's third best entry following "Not Afraid" (number one, 2010) and "Love the Way You Lie" also featuring Rihanna (number two, 2010). This ties "Berzerk", which also debuted at number three on the Hot 100. The entry gave Rihanna her 25th top ten on the chart, equaling Elvis Presley for the eighth-most top tens in the chart's history. This achievement also earned the singer the honor of being the fastest woman to accumulate the top ten tally (with eight years and four months since her first single), besting Madonna by three months. Furthermore, the debut marked Rihanna's 45th overall chart entry, tying Mariah Carey for the eighth most chart appearances amongst women.

The song concurrently opened at number one on the US Digital Songs chart, with sales of 373,000. The feat marked Eminem's ninth chart topper, giving him the third-most leaders in the tally's history, behind Katy Perry (9), and Rihanna, who increased her total to 13. The track also entered the US Radio Songs chart at number 31, marking Eminem's second-best entry position following "Just Lose It" (number 17, 2004). In the same issue, "The Monster" debuted atop the Hot R&B/Hip-Hop Songs chart, marking Eminem's first number one on the chart of his career, and Rihanna's third. Furthermore, the song entered at number one on the US Rap Songs chart, marking the sixth and fourth leaders for Eminem and Rihanna, respectively.

The song topped the Hot 100 in its sixth week on the chart, after previously spending four consecutive weeks at number two. The song's ascent to number one marked Rihanna's 13th US number one, tying her with Michael Jackson for the fourth most number ones in the chart's 55-year history. Additionally, Rihanna became the fastest solo artist to achieve 13 chart-toppers, surpassing the previous record held by Mariah Carey (seven-years, eight-month and 19 days), with only the Beatles reaching 13 number ones more quickly. The song also rose to number one on the Billboard Radio Songs chart, marking Rihanna's twelfth and Eminem's third number one on the chart. Rihanna also passes Mariah Carey for the most number ones on the Radio Songs chart with the single's number one peak. For Eminem, he ties Sean Combs and Ludacris for the most Hot 100 number ones among rappers, with five each. The song has sold 3,844,000 digital copies in the US as of June 2015. In Canada, the song debuted at number one on the Canadian Hot 100, selling 54,000 downloads, making it Eminem's highest selling debut week in Canada for a single since his song "Berzerk," which sold 50,000 downloads in its debut week.

In the United Kingdom, "The Monster" entered at number one on the UK Singles Chart on November 3, 2013―for the week ending date November 9, 2013―selling 74,674 copies, despite being released on the previous Tuesday, and having a 48-hour disadvantage on the rest of the week's new singles. The song however, sold 96,059 copies the following week it dropped to number two, selling more copies than it did on the week it reached number one. The song marked Eminem and Rihanna's eighth number one single in that country of their careers respectively. It became Eminem's first single to top the chart as a lead artist since "Like Toy Soldiers" in 2005. Eminem however was featured on Akon's chart topping single "Smack That" in 2006. As for Rihanna, the chart topper placed her with Elvis Presley and The Beatles in the chart's history, as just one of three acts to have scored seven number ones in Britain over seven consecutive years. The song was commercially successful around Europe, reaching the top of the charts in eight countries and entered the top 10 in every territory it charted in. Thus, in France, the song debuted atop the Singles Chart, becoming Rihanna's fifth number one and Eminem's first and only one. It was also Eminem's highest-charting debut in the country since "Love The Way You Lie" with Rihanna in 2010. The song also reached or debuted at the summit in Norway, Switzerland, Croatia, Finland, Slovakia, the Netherlands, Poland, Slovenia and Sweden and top ten in Germany, Belgium, Denmark, Spain, Hungary and Italy. In Asia and Oceania, the single was a huge hit reaching the top position in many countries, including Australia and Lebanon where it spent seven weeks at number one in "The Official Lebanese Top 20".

== Music video ==
Released on December 16, 2013, the song's accompanying music video, Eminem's third to be directed by the American filmmaker Rich Lee, depicts Rihanna as Eminem's therapist in a session, as previous videos from his career are shown and referenced including "Mockingbird", "My Name Is", "Lose Yourself", "3 a.m.", "The Way I Am" and the 2001 Grammy Awards performance of "Stan" with Elton John. The video was well received and earned three nominations at the 2014 MTV Video Music Awards, in the categories for "Best Male Video", "Best Collaboration" and "Best Direction". Eminem and Rihanna performed the song live at the 2014 MTV Movie Awards.

== Awards and nominations ==
| Year | Ceremony | Award | Result |
|---|---|---|---|
| 2014 | BET Hip Hop Awards | Best Collabo, Duo or Group | Nominated |
| 2014 | Billboard Music Award | Top Rap Song | Nominated |
| 2014 | iHeartRadio Awards | Song of The Year | Nominated |
| 2014 | iHeartRadio Awards | Best Collaboration | Nominated |
| 2014 | MTV Video Music Awards | Best Male Video | Nominated |
| 2014 | MTV Video Music Awards | Best Collaboration | Nominated |
| 2014 | MTV Video Music Awards | Best Direction | Nominated |
| 2014 | MTV Europe Music Awards | Best Song | Nominated |
| 2015 | Grammy Awards | Best Rap/Sung Collaboration | Won |

== Cover versions ==
The Russian-American guitarist Alex Feather Akimov, released a guitar cover of "The Monster", a recording that was recognized by Billboard.biz (Web Trends).

The Welsh band the Beef Seeds recorded a bluegrass version of "The Monster" on their album Keepin' it Beefy (EP) (released January 27, 2014, on iTunes)

In November 2013, Rudimental covered the song at BBC Radio 1's Live Lounge.

== Track listing ==
Digital download
| No. | Title | Writer(s) | Producer(s) | Length |
|---|---|---|---|---|
| 1. | "Monster" (featuring Rihanna) | Marshall Mathers; Bleta Rexha; Robyn Fenty; Aaron Kleinstub; Jon Bellion; Bryan Fryzel; Maki Athanasiou | Frequency; Aalias^{[a]} | 4:10 |

CD (2-track)
| No. | Title | Writer(s) | Producer(s) | Length |
|---|---|---|---|---|
| 1. | "Monster" (explicit; featuring Rihanna) | Marshall Mathers; Bleta Rexha; Robyn Fenty; Aaron Kleinstub; Jon Bellion; Bryan Fryzel; Maki Athanasiou | Frequency; Aalias^{[a]} | 4:10 |
| 2. | "Monster" (edited; featuring Rihanna) | Mathers; Rexha; Fenty; Kleinstub; Bellion; Fryzel; Athanasiou | Frequency; Aalias^{[a]} | 4:10 |
| Total length: | | | | 8:20 |

7-inch picture disc
| No. | Title | Length |
|---|---|---|
| 1. | "Monster" (featuring Rihanna) |
| 2. | "Bad Guy" |

Notes

- ^{^[a]} signifies a co-producer

== Charts ==
=== Weekly charts ===
Weekly chart performance for "The Monster"
| Chart (2013–2014) | Peak position |
|---|---|
| Australia (ARIA) | 1 |
| Austria (Ö3 Austria Top 40) | 6 |
| Belgium (Ultratop 50 Flanders) | 2 |
| Belgium (Ultratop 50 Wallonia) | 4 |
| Brazil (ABPD) | 1 |
| Brazil (Billboard Brasil Hot 100) | 8 |
| Brazil Hot Pop Songs | 1 |
| Canada Hot 100 (Billboard) | 1 |
| CIS Airplay (TopHit) | 1 |
| Croatia International Airplay (HRT) | 1 |
| Czech Republic Airplay (ČNS IFPI) | 4 |
| Czech Republic Singles Digital (ČNS IFPI) | 1 |
| Denmark (Tracklisten) | 2 |
| Euro Digital Song Sales (Billboard) | 1 |
| Euro Digital Tracks (Billboard) Explicit album version | 1 |
| Finland (Suomen virallinen lista) | 1 |
| France (SNEP) | 1 |
| Germany (GfK) | 3 |
| Greece Airplay (IFPI) | 1 |
| Greece Digital Songs (Billboard) | 1 |
| Hungary (Rádiós Top 40) | 30 |
| Hungary (Single Top 40) | 2 |
| Ireland (IRMA) | 1 |
| Italy (FIMI) | 5 |
| Japan Hot 100 (Billboard) | 20 |
| Lebanon (The Official Lebanese Top 20) | 1 |
| Mexico Anglo (Monitor Latino) | 1 |
| Netherlands (Dutch Top 40) | 2 |
| Netherlands (Single Top 100) | 3 |
| New Zealand (Recorded Music NZ) | 1 |
| Norway (VG-lista) | 1 |
| Poland Airplay (ZPAV) | 1 |
| Romania (Airplay 100) | 17 |
| Russia Airplay (TopHit) | 1 |
| Scottish Singles Sales (Official Charts) | 1 |
| Slovakia Airplay (ČNS IFPI) | 1 |
| Slovakia Singles Digital (ČNS IFPI) | 1 |
| Slovenia (SloTop50) | 7 |
| South Africa Airplay (EMA) | 1 |
| South Korea (Circle) | 58 |
| South Korea Foreign (Circle) | 1 |
| Spain (Promusicae) | 9 |
| Sweden (Sverigetopplistan) | 1 |
| Switzerland (Schweizer Hitparade) | 1 |
| Turkey (Turkish Singles Chart) | 1 |
| Ukraine Airplay (TopHit) | 11 |
| UK Singles (Official Charts) | 1 |
| UK Hip Hop/R&B (Official Charts) | 1 |
| US Billboard Hot 100 | 1 |
| US Adult Pop Airplay (Billboard) | 22 |
| US Dance Airplay (Billboard) | 11 |
| US Dance Club Songs (Billboard) | 22 |
| US Hot Latin Songs (Billboard) | 23 |
| US Hot R&B/Hip-Hop Songs (Billboard) | 1 |
| US Pop Airplay (Billboard) | 1 |
| US Rhythmic Airplay (Billboard) | 1 |
| Venezuela Pop Rock General (Record Report) | 1 |

=== Year-end charts ===
2013 year-end chart performance for "The Monster"
| Chart (2013) | Position |
|---|---|
| Australia (ARIA) | 24 |
| Belgium (Ultratop 50 Flanders) | 61 |
| Belgium Urban (Ultratop Flanders) | 15 |
| Belgium (Ultratop 50 Wallonia) | 97 |
| France (SNEP) | 61 |
| Germany (Media Control AG) | 55 |
| Italy (FIMI) | 87 |
| Netherlands (Dutch Top 40) | 52 |
| Netherlands (Single Top 100) | 35 |
| New Zealand (Recorded Music NZ) | 30 |
| South Korea Foreign (Circle) | 64 |
| Sweden (Sverigetopplistan) | 41 |
| Switzerland (Schweizer Hitparade) | 66 |
| UK Singles (OCC) | 26 |
| US Hot R&B/Hip-Hop Songs (Billboard) | 42 |

2014 year-end chart performance for "The Monster"
| Chart (2014) | Position |
|---|---|
| Australia (ARIA) | 72 |
| Belgium (Ultratop Flanders) | 53 |
| Belgium Urban (Ultratop) | 10 |
| Belgium (Ultratop Wallonia) | 69 |
| Brazil (Crowley) | 52 |
| Canada (Canadian Hot 100) | 16 |
| Denmark (Tracklisten) | 39 |
| France (SNEP) | 105 |
| Germany (Official German Charts) | 77 |
| Hungary (Single Top 40) | 84 |
| Italy (FIMI) | 41 |
| Netherlands (Dutch Top 40) | 34 |
| New Zealand (Recorded Music NZ) | 45 |
| Russia Airplay (TopHit) | 20 |
| South Korea Foreign (Circle) | 98 |
| Sweden (Sverigetopplistan) | 33 |
| Switzerland (Schweizer Hitparade) | 51 |
| UK Singles (Official Charts Company) | 93 |
| Ukraine Airplay (TopHit) | 66 |
| US Billboard Hot 100 | 16 |
| US Hot R&B/Hip-Hop Songs (Billboard) | 5 |
| US Mainstream Top 40 (Billboard) | 13 |
| US Rhythmic (Billboard) | 4 |

=== Decade-end charts ===
Decade-end chart performance for "The Monster"
| Chart (2010–2019) | Position |
|---|---|
| Australia (ARIA) | 70 |
| US Hot R&B/Hip-Hop Songs (Billboard) | 42 |

== Certifications ==
Certifications for "The Monster"
| Region | Certification | Certified units/sales |
|---|---|---|
| Australia (ARIA) | 11× Platinum | 770,000^{‡} |
| Belgium (BRMA) | Gold | 15,000^{*} |
| Brazil (Pro-Música Brasil) | Diamond | 250,000^{‡} |
| Canada (Music Canada) | 2× Platinum | 160,000^{*} |
| Denmark (IFPI Danmark) | Gold | 15,000^{^} |
| Germany (BVMI) | 3× Gold | 450,000^{‡} |
| Italy (FIMI) | 3× Platinum | 150,000^{‡} |
| Mexico (AMPROFON) | Platinum | 60,000^{*} |
| New Zealand (RMNZ) | 5× Platinum | 150,000^{‡} |
| Portugal (AFP) | Gold | 10,000^{‡} |
| Sweden (GLF) | 5× Platinum | 200,000^{‡} |
| Switzerland (IFPI Switzerland) | Platinum | 30,000^{^} |
| United Kingdom (BPI) | 3× Platinum | 1,800,000^{‡} |
| United States (RIAA) | 8× Platinum | 8,000,000^{‡} |
Streaming
| Denmark (IFPI Danmark) | 3× Platinum | 5,400,000^{†} |
^{*} Sales figures based on certification alone.^{^} Shipments figures based on certification alone.^{‡} Sales+streaming figures based on certification alone.^{†} Streaming-only figures based on certification alone.

== Release history ==
"The Monster" release history
| Region | Date | Format(s) | Label(s) | Ref. |
|---|---|---|---|---|
| France | October 29, 2013 | Digital download | Aftermath; Interscope; Shady | |
| Germany | October 29, 2013 | Digital download | Aftermath; Interscope; Shady | |
| Italy | October 29, 2013 | Digital download | Aftermath; Interscope; Shady | |
| Italy | October 29, 2013 | Radio airplay | Universal | |
| Spain | October 29, 2013 | Digital download | Aftermath; Interscope; Shady | |
| United Kingdom | October 29, 2013 | Digital download | Aftermath; Interscope; Shady | |
| United States | October 29, 2013 | Digital download | Aftermath; Interscope; Shady | |
| United States | November 5, 2013 | Contemporary hit radio; rhythmic contemporary radio | Aftermath; Interscope; Shady | |
| United States | November 11, 2013 | Urban contemporary radio | Aftermath; Interscope; Shady | |
| Germany | November 18, 2013 | CD | Interscope; Universal | |
| Various | December 15, 2023 | 7-inch picture disc | | |

== See also ==
- List of best-selling singles in the United States
- List of number-one singles of 2013 (Australia)
- List of Canadian Hot 100 number-one singles of 2013
- List of number-one singles of 2013 (Ireland)
- List of number-one singles of 2013 (Finland)
- List of number-one hits of 2013 (France)
- List of number-one singles from the 2010s (New Zealand)
- List of number-one songs in Norway
- List of number-one singles of 2013 (Poland)
- List of number-one singles of 2014 (Poland)
- List of number-one singles of the 2010s (Sweden)
- List of number-one hits of 2013 (Switzerland)
- List of Billboard Hot 100 number ones of 2013
- List of Billboard Rhythmic number-one songs of the 2010s
- List of Billboard Mainstream Top 40 number-one songs of 2013
- List of UK Singles Chart number ones of the 2010s
- List of UK R&B Singles Chart number ones of 2013
- List of UK Singles Downloads Chart number ones of the 2010s
- List of number-one R&B/hip-hop songs of 2013 (U.S.)
- List of highest-certified singles in Australia
- The Monster Tour
