= Yonas (rapper) =

American rapper

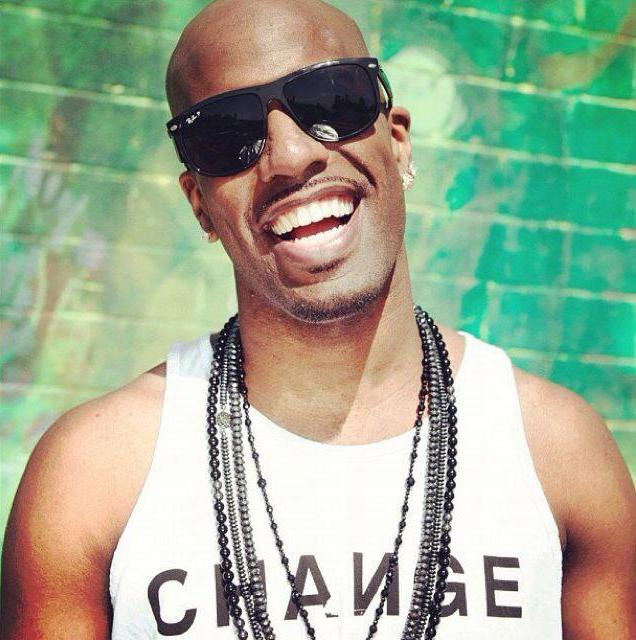

Background information
- Born: Yonas Mellesse; Bronx, New York, United States
- Origin: New York, New York, United States
- Genres: Hip hop, rap, alternative hip hop, pop
- Years active: 2009–present
- Website: www.yonasmusic.com

Yonas Mellesse, known by the stage name YONAS, is an American hip hop artist from New York City. He has released four albums, The Proven Theory (2011), The Transition Deluxe (2013), About Time (2018), and The Kid from Morris Heights (2022), as well as several EPs and mixtapes.

== Career ==
In 2009, Yonas released his first EP, New Golden Era, independently, winning a Billboard Songwriting Award for his single "Banga". A year later he released his first mixtape, produced by Sean Ross, entitled I Am Us. In 2011 he released his first album on iTunes, The Proven Theory. The music video for his single "Shy Kidz" was featured on MTVu and Fuse TV on Demand, after he won an audience vote in a contest for independent artists.

His next mixtape, The Transition, was released in 2012. It was downloaded 70,000 times in the first two months. Yonas was featured as a Breakout artist in XXL magazine in June 2012. Yonas performed a 50-city nationwide tour in the fall of 2012, opening for Aer. Yonas has performed with Macklemore & Ryan Lewis, Wale, Juicy J, Timeflies, Gorilla Zoe, The White Panda, and Logic.

His music video "Fall Back" appeared in the motion picture, The Place Beyond the Pines (2012). His EP The Black Canvas, released on February 4, 2013, reached no.4 on iTunes Hip-Hop/ Rap charts and no.25 on the iTunes overall album chart.

== Personal life ==
Yonas is married to Shaelyn Mellesse. Their daughter was born on March 3, 2018.

== Discography ==
=== Albums ===
- The Proven Theory (2011)
- The Transition Deluxe (2013)
- About Time (2018)
- The Kid from Morris Heights (2022)

=== EPs ===
- The New Golden Era (2010)
- The Black Canvas (2013)
- Going Places (2015)
- Everyday Like It's Friday (2016)

=== Mixtapes ===
- I Am Us (2010)
- The Transition (2012)
- The Transition 2: Bright Lights, Big City (2013)

=== Music videos ===
Title	Year	Director
"I Could"	2010	Betterdays Media
"Shy Kidz"	2011	Betterdays Media
"Pumped Up Kicks"	2011	Betterdays Media
"Fall Back"	2011	Betterdays Media
"The Transition"	2012	Betterdays Media
"Don't Give A Damn"	2012	Betterdays Media
"Girls of Summer"	2013	Betterdays Media
"Rollercoaster (feat. OCD: Moosh & Twist)"	2013	Betterdays Media
"Leaving You"	2014	Jakob Owens
"4AM"	2015	Nick Marfing & Cory Hammon of Altamira Film Co.
"Blank Space (Remix)"	2015	Jonnie Baker
"Centuries (Remix)"	2015	Nick Marfing & Cory Hammon of Altamira Film Co.
"Take Me To Church (Remix)"	2015	Nick Marfing & Cory Hammon of Altamira Film Co.
"Uptown Funk (Remix)"	2015	Nick Marfing, Cory Hammon & Matt Lohmann of Altamira Film Co.
"Live It Up"	2015	Jakob Owens
"Night Is Young"	2015	Hunter Lyon
"Hello (feat. Living In Fiction)"	2015	Mike Squires
"Summertime Luv"	2016	Mike Squires
"Roll One Up (feat. Roscoe Dash & Sammy Adams)"	2016	Mike Squires
"Photo"	2017	Mike Squires
"I'm Good (feat. XV)"	2017	Mike Squires
"You F#cked Up "	2017	Mike Squires
