= Frequency (music producer) =

- Birth name: Bryan Fryzel
- Born: January 17, 1983 (age 42)
- Origin: Rockville Centre, New York, United States
- Genres: Hip hop; R&B; pop
- Years active: 2003–present
- Labels: Freq Show Music
- Website: wholedoubts.com

Bryan Fryzel (born January 17, 1983), better known by his stage name Frequency, is an American music producer and musician from Rockville Centre, New York.

== Biography ==
Frequency was born in Rockville Centre, New York in 1983. While attending Oceanside High School, he began to DJ at school dances and house parties. He also began experimenting with production. While still in high school, Frequency met 6th Sense, a MC from Pelham, New York. Soon thereafter, the two of them formed a group, The Understudies, alongside 6th Sense's friend and mentor Mr. Tibbs. The Understudies then signed a record deal on Freshchest/High Time Records, where they released the 12" single, "Now & Then" b/w "Bananas" in the summer of 2004. Later that year, Frequency went on to work with several artists he had met in New York's independent scene: from Wordsworth ("Shoulder," "One Day" and "Don't Go" on Mirror Music) to Oktober (“NYC” on Projekt: Building) to Tonedef (“Give A Damn Remix” on Archetype) to El Da Sensei (“Natural Feel Good” on The Unusual).

2006 was a break out year for Frequency. That year, Frequency won Scion's New York leg of the King of the Beats competition, and produced a number of records for major label artists such as “Plenty of Love” by Raekwon, Gravy and Tikky Diamonds and “Ya’ll Can’t Live His Life” by Cam'ron and "Think About It" by Snoop Dogg. Snoop himself repeatedly referred to the song in interviews as his favorite track on the album.

Soon thereafter, Frequency began working with the Trackmasters, with whom he produced several tracks for an unreleased Lil' Kim LP, as well as tracks for The Game, Keyshia Cole, Beenie Man, Slim (from 112) and others. He also continued to place records on his own, producing songs such as “One Chance (Make It Good)” for Snoop Dogg's 2008 release Ego Trippin', "Like Me" for Ja Rule, and "White Linen Affair" for Ghostface Killah.

By 2009, Frequency began working extensively with Slaughterhouse, serving as their tour DJ, producing their first two singles -- "Onslaught" and "Fight Klub"—and working with each individual member. In December of that year, Frequency released "Road Kill" with Joell Ortiz, a mixtape featuring freestyles that Joell recorded during the K.O.D. Tour and four original tracks, three of which - "Ortiz In This Bitch", "Snake Charmer", and "50 For the People" — were produced by Frequency.

Over the next several years, Frequency went on to work with Machine Gun Kelly, B.o.B., Iffy the Badman and more.

Frequency is perhaps best known for co-writing and co-producing the #1 hit song "The Monster" by Eminem featuring Rihanna, released in October 2013. "The Monster" reached No. 1 on eight separate Billboard charts, including four weeks at No. 1 on the Hot 100 and thirteen weeks at No. 1 on the Hot R&B/Hip-Hop Songs chart. It also topped the charts in twelve countries including Australia, Canada, France, Ireland, New Zealand, Switzerland, and the United Kingdom and won a Grammy for Best/Rap Sung Collaboration.

In recent years, Frequency has expanded his horizons by working on more pop and rock projects. Specifically, Frequency produced the debut album for New York-based band MisterWives, entitled Our Own House. The album's lead single "Reflections" peaked at No. 13 on the Billboard Hot Rock Songs chart and went Gold. Frequency also produced the debut album "Waiting For The Sun" from Weekday/Sony band Jule Vera and 5 of 7 songs on the debut EP from Bryce Fox.

== Selected discography ==
Artist	Song	Album (label year)
Ava Max	"Skin in the Game" & "How Can I Dance"	Don't Click Play (Atlantic 2025)
Madison Watkins	"Goodbye"	(Provident/Sony 2025)
Emmy Meli	"God's Favorite"	(BMG 2025)
Fordo	"Another Life"	2001 (SANA/Listen to the Kids 2025)
AleXa	"Arrogant"	Sugarcoat (ZB Label/Intertwine Music 2024)
Nick Kent	"Afterglow"	Afterglow (2025)
Saleka	"Save Me"	LADY RAVEN (Original Music from the Motion Picture TRAP (Columbia Records 2024)
Lu Kala	"Cry Baby"	(LVK/Amigo Records 2024)
AleXa	"distraction"	(ZB Label/Intertwine Music 2024)
CXLOE	"Shapeshifter"	Shiny New Thing(CXLOE/Independent Co. 2024)
Chaislyn	"Make Believe"	(2024)
Christian Paul	"Gravity"	(Capitol CMG 2024)
Fordo	"Kiss Me Goodbye"	(Sana/Listen to the Kids 2024)
Moncrief	"the sun is shining somewhere"	Selfcare (engine/BMG 2024)
RL Grime	"Slow Dive" feat. Bea Miller [Produced with Andrew Wells, Holly, & RL Grime]	PLAY (Sable Valley Records 2023)
NERIAH	"Shoulda Coulda Didn't"	No One Crlies Forever (Neriah Records/Lowly/Create Music Group 2023)
HAVEN	"Critical Trust Issues"	(HAVEN Music 2023)
HAVEN	"Placeholder"	(HAVEN Music 2023)
Christian Paul	"All My Days"	(Capitol CMG 2022)
Leah Kate	"Breakup SZN"	Alive and Unwell (10K Projects 2022)
Mia Rodriguez	"Shut Up"	(Atlantic 2022)
Christian Paul	"Walk Away"	(Capitol CMG 2022)
Christian Paul	"Won't Rain Anymore"	(Capitol CMG 2022)
Sofia Carson	"Glowin' Up" (From My Little Pony: A New Generation)	(eOne 2021)
Tate McRae	"r u ok"	TOO YOUNG TO BE SAD (RCA 2021)
WONHO	"Ain't About You" feat. kiiara	Love Synonym #2: Right for Us (Highline Entertainment 2021)
kenzie	"Donuts" feat. Yung Bae	(Arista Records 2020)
Sofia Carson	"Hold On To Me" [Produced with Aalias for Whole Doubts]	(Hollywood Records 2020)
WONHO	"Open Mind" [Produced with Aalias for Whole Doubts]	Love Synonym #1: Right for Me (Highline Entertainment 2020)
Bliss n Eso	"So Happy" feat. SonReal	(Flight Deck / Mushroom 2020)
Jacquie	"Grim" & "Forever"	Infinity (Steel Wool 2020)
Jacquie	"Red"	(Steel Wool 2020)
Fergus James	"Good Man"	(100s + 1000s 2020)
iLoveMakonnen	"I'm Not OK" // "Shoot Shoot"	M3 (Warner Records 2019)
Angie Rose	"Lie to Me (Story of Eve)"	(Capitol CMG 2019)
Whole Doubts	"Shiver" feat. Jaira Burns	(Whole Doubts 2019)
Whole Doubts	"Spoke Up" feat. Gabi Sklar	(Whole Doubts 2019)
Marcos G	"Like That"	(Marcos G 2019)
Nikki Vianna	"Done"	(Atlantic 2018)
Abir	"Young & Rude"	(Atlantic 2018)
DYLN	"Truth" // "The Difference" // "Without You" [All Produced with DYLN]	Chapter 1: The Truth (DYLN 2018)
Eminem	"Revival (Interlude)" feat. Alice and the Glass Lake [Produced with Aalias for Whole Doubts]	Revival (Interscope 2017)
Whole Doubts	”Leave” feat. Kevin Garrett	(Whole Doubts 2017)
Bryce Fox	"Coldhearted" // "Heaven On Hold" // "Voodoo" // "Burn Fast" // "Stomp Me Out"	Heaven On Hold (2017)
Jule Vera	"Show Me" // "Something Good" // "10,000 Hours" // "Bad Company" // "Lifeline" // "Porch Swing" // "Cruel Life" // "Running" // "Waiting" // "Can't Help"	Waiting On the Sun (Weekday/Sony 2017)
Ashe	"Used To It"	(Mom + Pop 2017)
Outasight	"NY2LA"	Richie (RPM MSC 2017)
American Authors	"Mess With Your Heart"	What We Live For (Island 2016)
Ashanti	"Helpless" feat. Ja Rule	The Hamilton Mixtape (Atlantic 2016)
Handsome Ghost	"Eyes Wide" feat. Whole Doubts [Produced with Aalias]	The Brilliant Glow (Photo Finish 2016)
The Summer Set	"The Night Is Young"	Stories For Monday (Fearless 2016)
Blackbear	"90210" feat. G-Eazy	Deadroses (Beartrap 2016)
Melanie Martinez	"Mad Hatter" [Produced with Aalias]	Cry Baby (Atlantic 2015)
Misterwives	"Our Own House" // "Not Your Way" // "Reflections" // "Oceans" // "Best I Can Do" // "Hurricane" // "No Need For Dreaming" // "Box Around the Sun" // "Queens" // "Queens (Remix)" feat. G-Eazy	Our Own House (Republic 2014)
Bebe Rexha	"Gone" [Co-Produced with Aalias; Maki]	(Warner Bros. 2014)
Eminem	"The Monster" feat. Rihanna [Co-Produced by Aalias; Add'l Inst. by Maki]	The Marshall Mathers LP 2 (Interscope 2013)
Joe Budden	"Skeletons" feat. Joell Ortiz, Royce Da 5'9" & Kaydence	No Love Lost (eOne 2013)
B.o.B.	"Chandelier" feat. Lauriana Mae	Strange Clouds (Atlantic 2012)
Charli Baltimore	"All Lies" feat. Maino	True Lies (Gracie Productions 2012)
Machine Gun Kelly	"All We Have"	Lace Up (Bad Boy/Interscope 2012)
FNA	"Take Me Home Tonight"	(Big Beat/Atlantic 2011)
Iffy the Badman	"Do You?"	(Republic 2011)
Joel Ortiz	"So Hard"	Free Agent (eOne 2011)
Slaughterhouse	"Fight Klub (Remix)" & "Move On (Remix)"	Slaughterhouse EP (eOne 2011)
Joe Budden	"Welcome to Real Life"	Mood Music 4 (Gracie 2010)
Kutt Calhoun	"She Wants Me" feat. Irv Da Phenom & Too Short // "Only Knew" // "Hey Hey Hey (Raw and Un-Kutt)" // "Kansas City Shuffle"	Raw and Un-Kutt (Strange Music 2010)
Royce Da 5'9"	"In Da Club"	Bar Exam 3 (2010)
Crooked I	"You Shoulda Made A Phone Call"	Mr. Pig Face Weapon Waist (One Records 2009)
French Montana	"Cocaine Konvict"	Mac Wit The Cheese (Republic 2009)
Royce Da 5'9"	"Soldier" & "Murda"	Street Hop (M.I.C. Records 2009)
Slaughterhouse	"Fight Klub"	Slaughterhouse (eOne 2009)
Lemarvin	"Around My Way" feat. The Game	(Brookland/Universal 2008)
Lil' Kim	"Download" feat. T-Pain [Co-Produced by Frequency]	(Brookland/Universal 2008)
Ras Kass	"I'm All That"	Institutionalized Vol. 2 (Babygrande 2008)
Snoop Dogg	"One Chance (Make It Good)"	Ego Trippin' (Geffen 2008)
Ghostface Killah	"White Linen Affair (Toney Awards)"	The Big Doe Rehab (Def Jam 2007)
Juganot	"En Why Cee" feat. Joell Ortiz & Uncle Murda	(Strictly Live 2007)
DJ Envy & Red Cafe	"Invincible"	The Co-Op (Koch 2007)
Cam'ron	"Y'all Can't Live His Life"	Duke Da God Presents: The Movement Moves On (Asylum 2006)
El Da Sensei	"Natural Feel Good"	The Unusual (Fat Beats 2006)
Raekwon	"Plenty Of Love" feat. Tikky & Gravy	(2006)
Snoop Dogg	"Think About It"	Tha Blue Carpet Treatment (Geffen 2006)
Wordsworth	"One Day" // "Shoulder" // "Don't Go"	(Halftooth 2004)
