= 2012 Bonnaroo Music Festival =

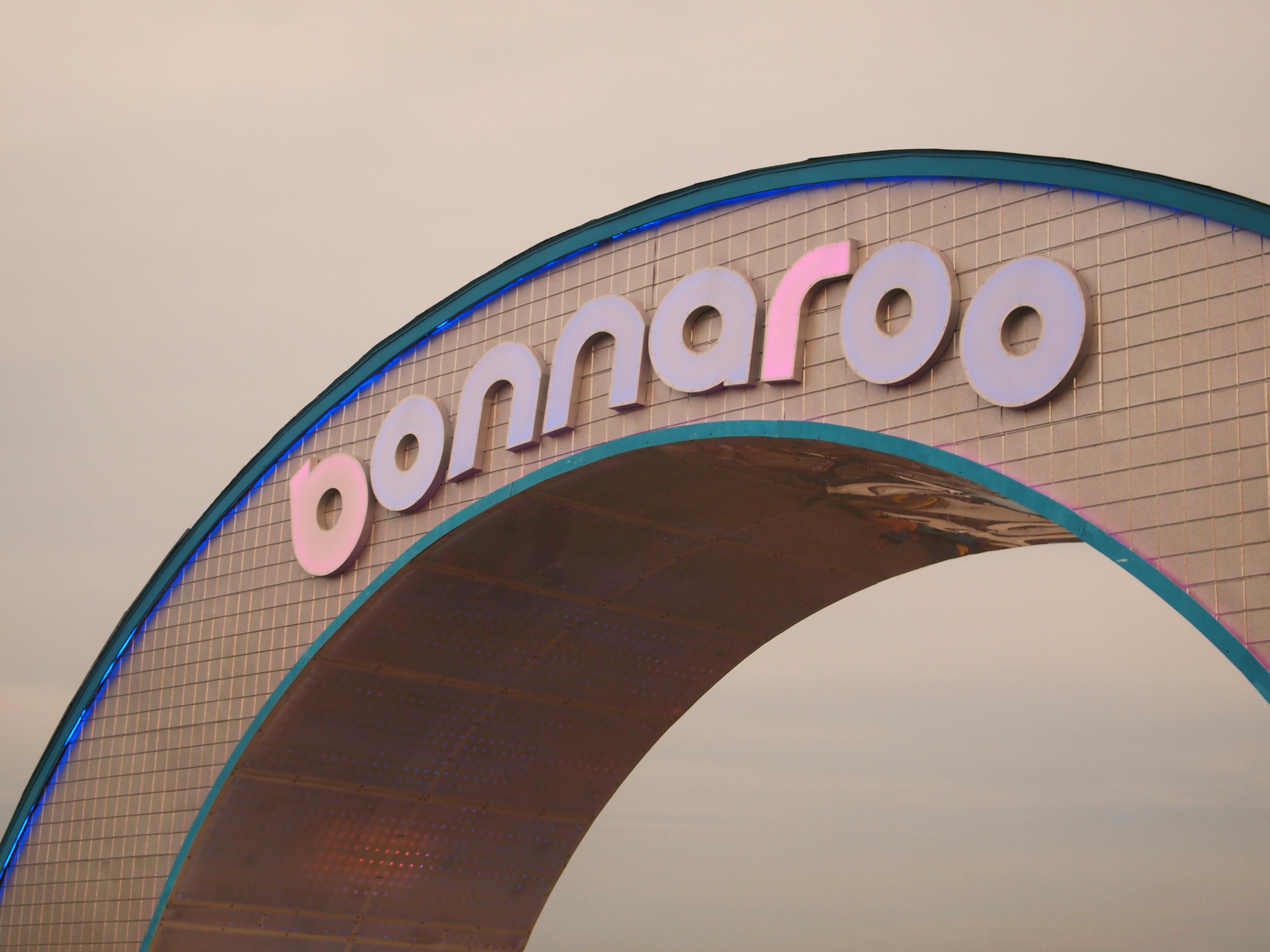
The Centeroo Arch

The 2012 Bonnaroo Music Festival was held June 7–10, 2012 in Manchester, Tennessee, United States, and marked the 11th time the festival has been held since its inception in 2002.

On March 12, six more artists were added to the line up. Danzig Legacy (featuring music by Danzig, Samhain and Danzig/Doyle performing The Misfits), The Temper Trap, Santigold, Puscifer, fun. and The Cave Singers.

The Festival announced on April 11 that four more artists would be added to the lineup: Rodrigo y Gabriela and C.U.B.A., the Sam Bush Band, Michael Kiwanuka and Black Box Revelation. Phish also played a second full set. Attendance at the 2012 festival surpassed 100,000, a record for Bonnaroo.

== Line-up ==
=== Thursday, June 7 ===
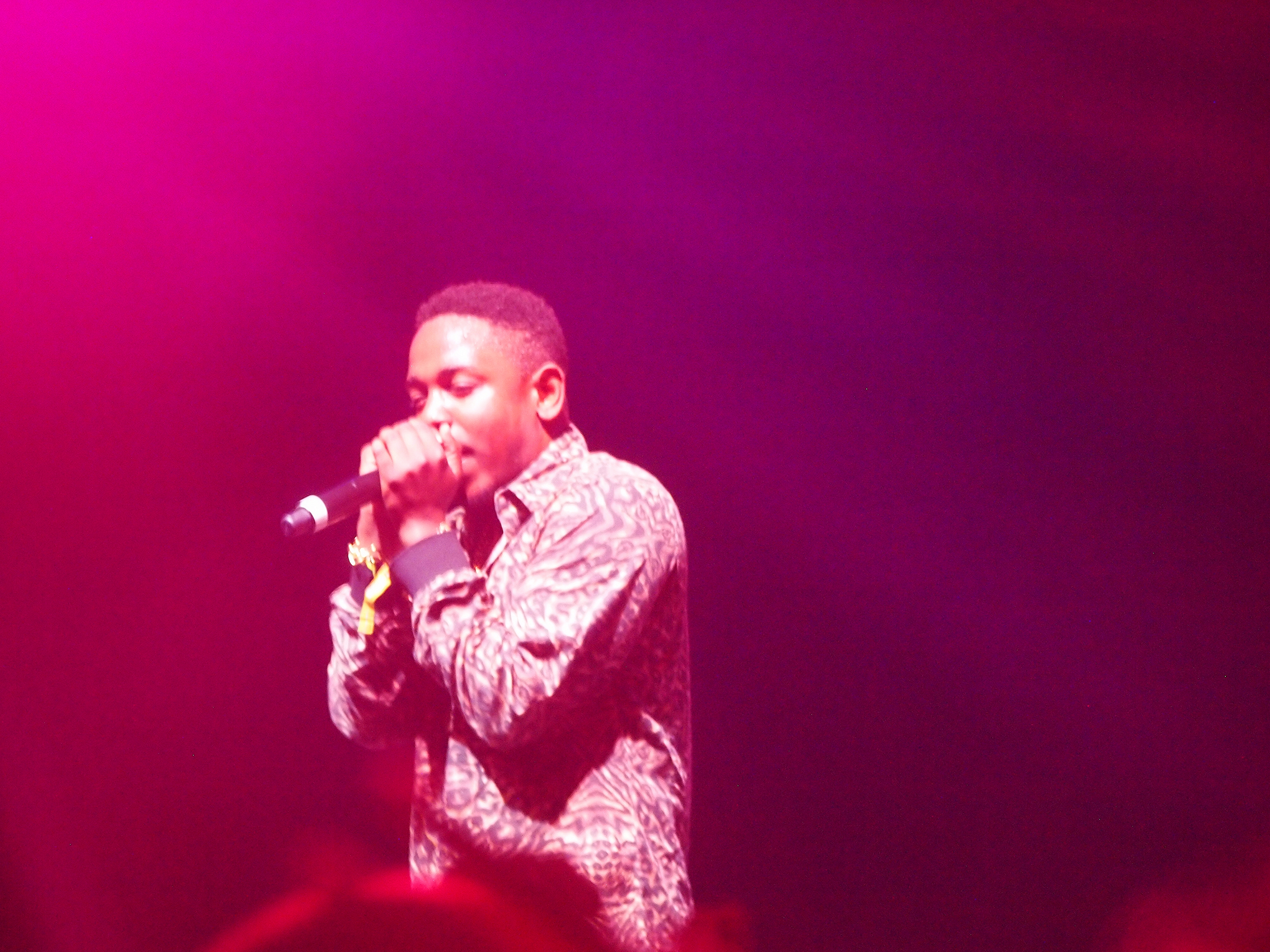
Kendrick Lamar performing

(artists listed from earliest to latest set times)

- This Tent:
  - The Dirty Guv'nahs
  - The Lonely Forest
  - Danny Brown
  - Yelawolf
  - Kendrick Lamar
  - Alabama Shakes
- That Tent:
  - K.Flay
  - Mariachi El Bronx
  - Orgone
  - Moon Taxi
  - SOJA
  - Big Gigantic
- The Other Tent:
  - EMA
  - The Cave Singers
  - Dale Earnhardt Jr. Jr.
  - White Denim
  - Phantogram
  - MiMosa
- The Bonnaroo Comedy Theatre:
  - CC: Stand-Up: The Bonnaroo Experience (2 sets)
  - Brian Posehn, Pete Holmes, Kyle Kinane & Ali Wong (2 sets)
  - The Chris Gethard Show
- The Great Taste Lounge Brewed by Miller Lite
  - Fort Atlantic
  - Rollin' In The Hay
  - Water Knot
  - The Casey Driessen Singularity
  - Hudost
  - MonstrO
  - Marina Orchestra
  - Glossary
  - Cherub
- The Solar Stage:
  - The Apple Butter Express
  - Breakdancing
  - Rubblebucket
  - The Flavor Savers: Beard & Mustache Contest
  - The Dirty Guv'nahs
  - Ogya
  - The Carnivalesque Cabaret- Burlesque, Bellydance & Sideshow
- Cinema Tent:
  - Bad Brains: Band in DC
  - Green Screens Presented by Rock The Earth: Chasing Ice - Q&A with director Jeff Orlowski
  - SF Sketchfest Presents: The Doug Benson Movie Interruption of Crank: High Voltage – Doug Benson & Friends
  - [adult swim] presents: things you've never seen
  - NBA East Finals Game 6
  - Laurel & Hardy Shorts – Live Score Performed by Steven Bernstein’s MTO
  - God Bless America - Q&A with director/screenwriter Bobcat Goldthwait
  - Trapped in the Closet Sing-Along! – Hosted by Henri Mazza
- The Silent Disco powered by Philips Citiscape Collection
  - DJ XSV
  - K-Flay (DJ Set)
  - DJ Equal
  - Jared Dietch / Quickie Mart

=== Friday, June 8 ===
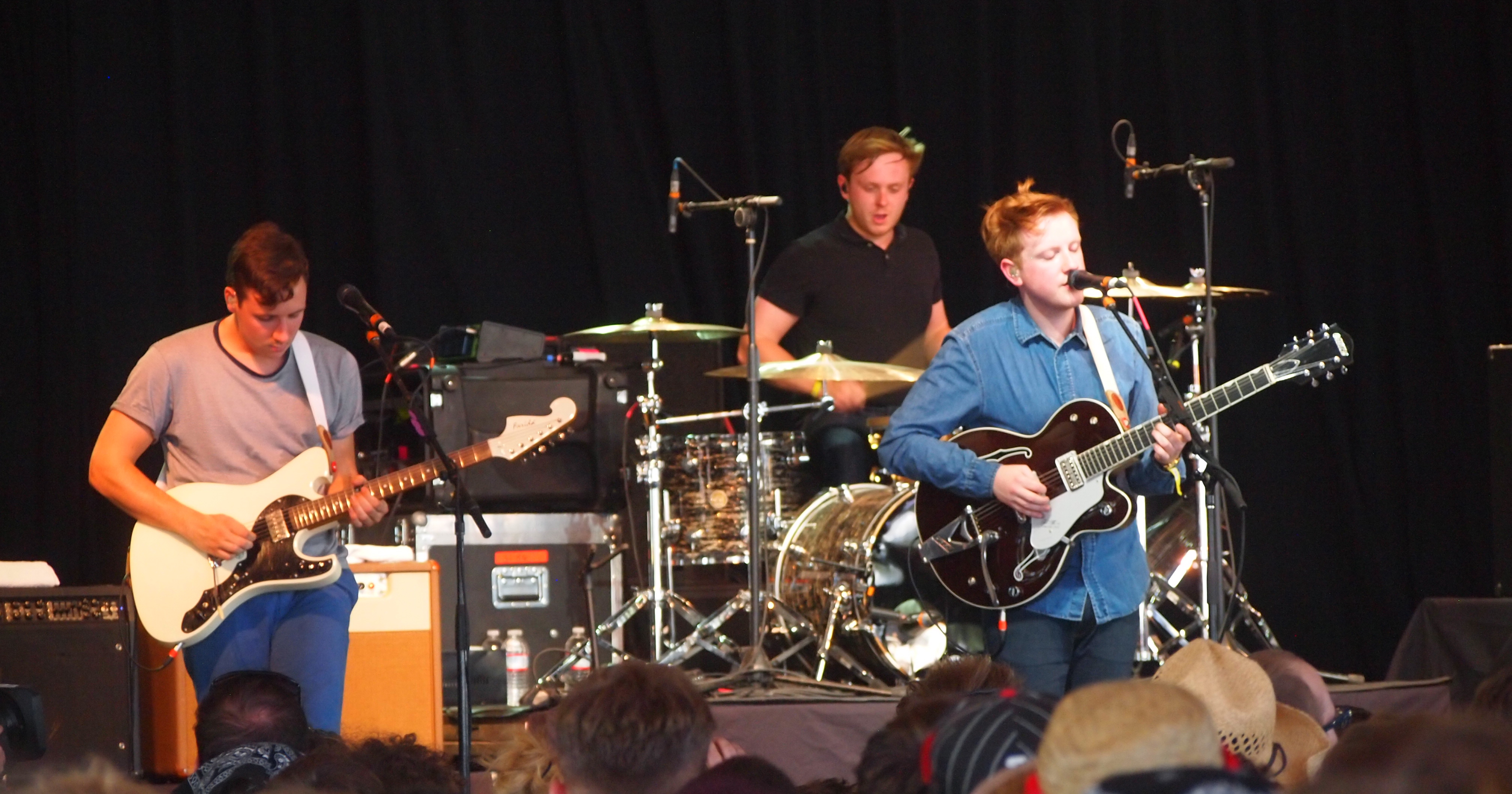
Two Door Cinema Club performing

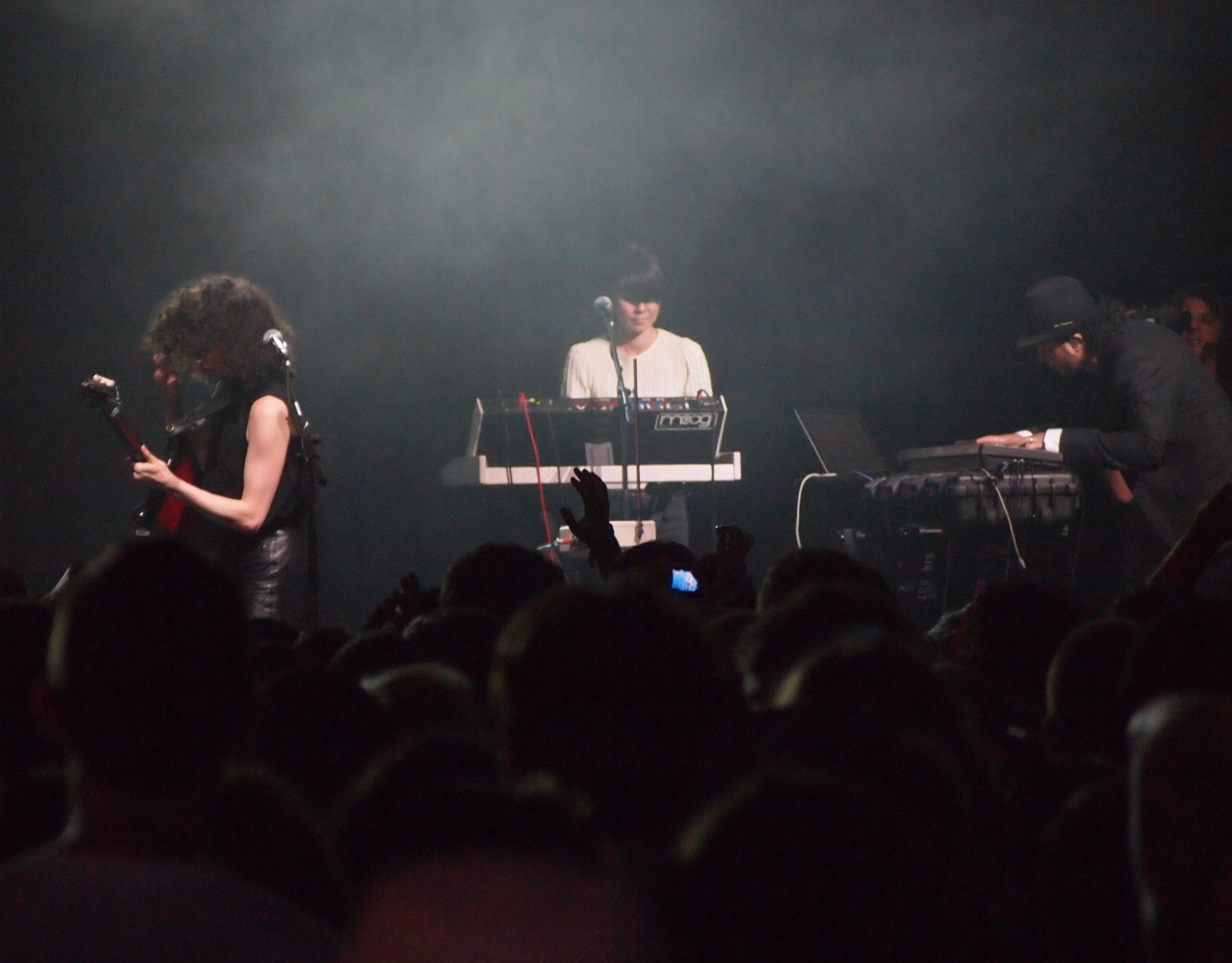
St. Vincent performing

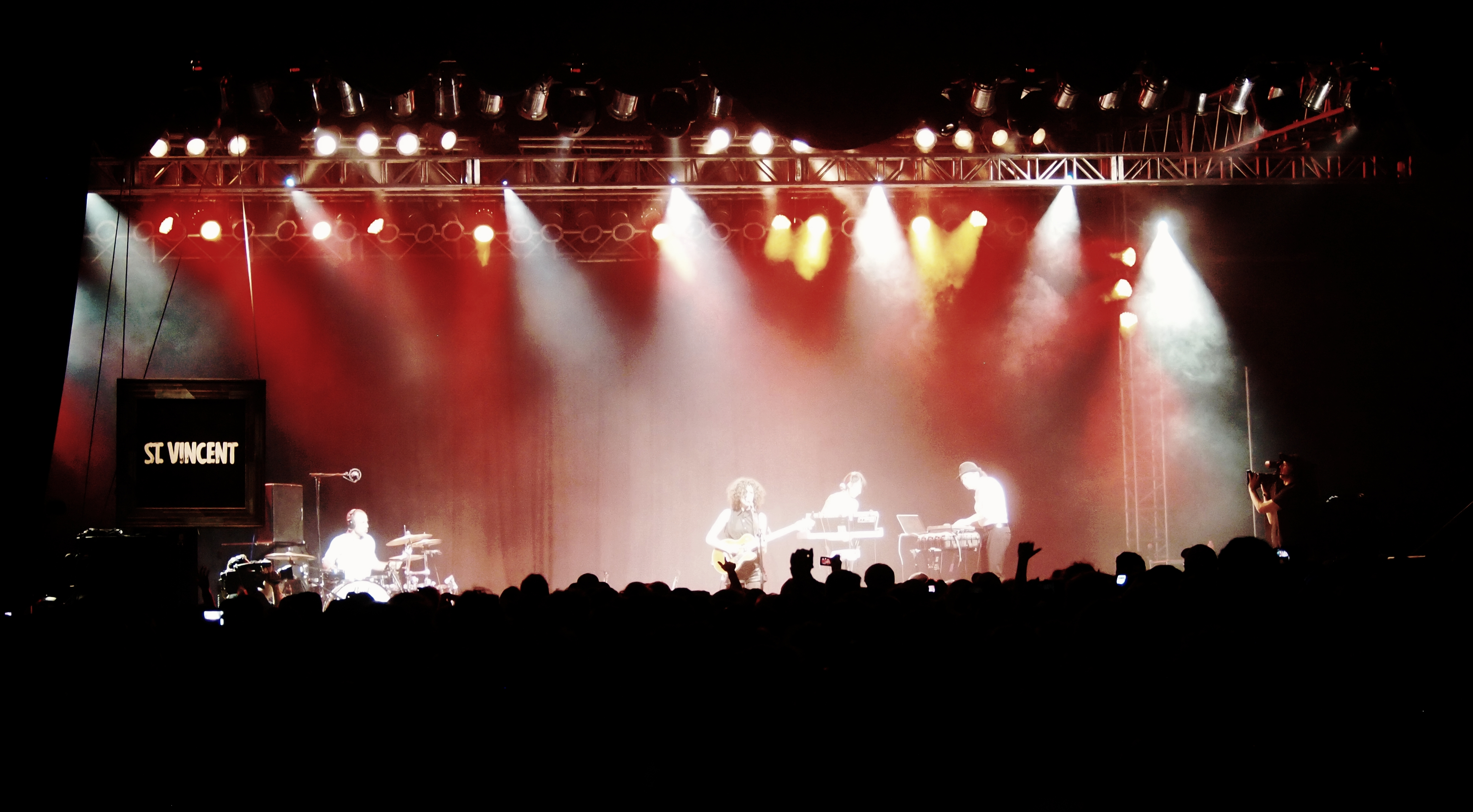
St. Vincent performing

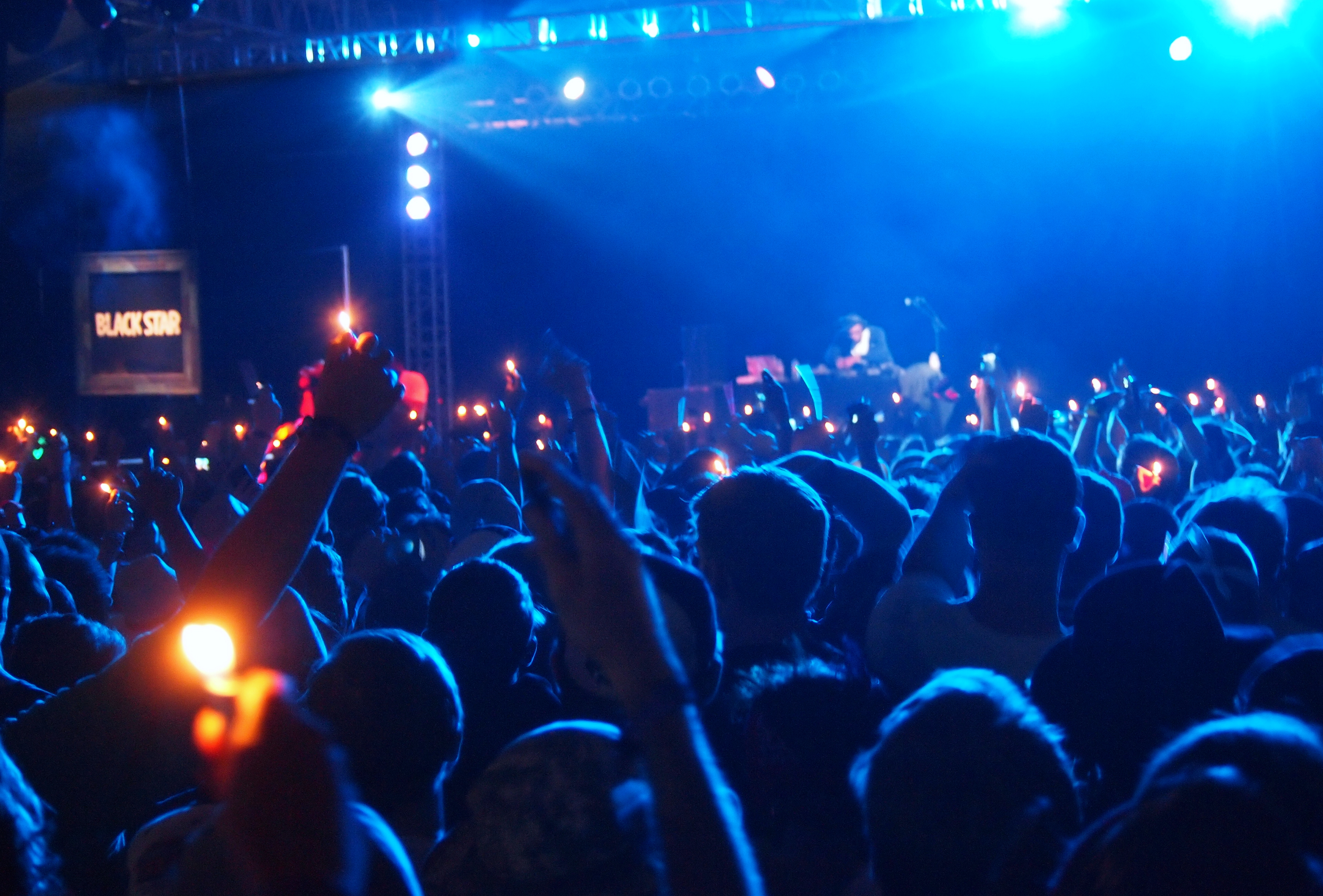
Black Star performing

- What Stage:
  - The Soul Rebels
  - Sharon Jones & The Dap-Kings
  - The Avett Brothers
  - Rodrigo y Gabriela and C.U.B.A.
  - Radiohead
- Which Stage:
  - The Kooks
  - Needtobreathe
  - AfroCubism
  - Feist
  - Foster the People
- This Tent:
  - Electric Guest
  - Tune-Yards
  - Two Door Cinema Club
  - Little Dragon
  - Ludacris
  - Major Lazer
  - Umphrey's McGee
- That Tent:
  - Michael Kiwanuka
  - Ben Howard
  - Laura Marling
  - Fitz and the Tantrums
  - St. Vincent
  - Black Star
  - Flying Lotus
- The Other Tent:
  - Steven Bernstein's MTO Plays SLY
  - The Infamous Stringdusters
  - Sam Bush
  - Trampled By Turtles
  - Dawes
  - The Word (John Medeski, Robert Randolph, North Mississippi Allstars)
  - Ivan Neville's Dumpstaphunk
  - Big Freedia
- The Bonnaroo Comedy Theatre:
  - Colin Hay, Garfunkel and Oates, Mike O'Connell
  - Marc Maron, World Champion Judah Friedlander, & Amy Schumer
  - Aziz Ansari & Rory Scovel (2 sets)
  - CC: Stand-Up: The Bonnaroo Experience
- Café Where:
  - Paladino
  - Claire and the Reasons
  - Chappo
  - The Deep Dark Woods
- The Great Taste Lounge Brewed by Miller Lite:
  - Shahidah Omar
  - Trixie Whitley
  - Katie Herzig
  - Caitlin Rose
  - Hey Rosetta!
  - Oberhofer
  - Sara Watkins
  - Pujol
  - Rubblebucket
  - Valient Thorr
- Sonic Stage:
  - Dale Earnhardt Jr. Jr.
  - The Dirty Guv'nahs
  - Moon Taxi
  - Rubblebucket
  - Colin Hay
  - The Soul Rebels
  - Punch Brothers
  - Ben Howard
  - AfroCubism
  - The Infamous Stringdusters
- The Solar Stage:
  - Dub Kartel
  - Katie Herzig:RtE Interview / Performance
  - SOJA: RtE Interview / Performance
  - RtE Panel Discussion re: NOLA Ivan Neville, etc.
  - Rubblebucket: RtE Interview / Performance
  - The Infamous Stringdusters: RtE Interview & Performance
  - The Flavor Savers: Beard & Mustache Contest
  - DJ TableSaw
  - Robert Ellit
  - Hula Hoopers LED
  - Breakdancing
  - The Carnivalesque Cabaret- Burlesque, Bellydance & Sideshow
- Cinema Tent:
  - Green Screens Presented by Rock The Earth: The Big Fix - Intro by Ivan Neville of Dumpstaphunk
  - Special Advance Screening: Hit and Run – Q&A with Dax Shepard & Kristen Bell
  - SF Sketchfest Presents The Doug Benson Movie Interruption of Rambo (2008 version) - Doug Benson & Friends Live
  - Buster Keaton Shorts - Live Score Performed by Tune-Yards and Ava Mendoza
  - Green Screens Presented by Rock The Earth: The Island President - Intro by Bob Ferguson of Oxfam America
  - [adult swim] presents: things you've never seen
  - Marley
  - Tim and Eric's Billion Dollar Movie
- The Silent Disco powered by Philips Citiscape Collection
  - K-Flay (DJ set)
  - DJ XSV
  - Mark Foster of Foster the People
  - DJ Equal / Quickie Mart
  - Jared Dietch / Wyllys

=== Saturday, June 9 ===
- What Stage:
  - Charles Bradley and His Extraordinaires
  - The Temper Trap
  - Santigold
  - The Roots
  - Red Hot Chili Peppers
- Which Stage:
  - The Devil Makes Three
  - Blind Pilot
  - Punch Brothers
  - Childish Gambino
  - Dispatch
  - Skrillex
- This Tent:
  - Darondo
  - Das Racist
  - Battles
  - SBTRKT
  - Mogwai
  - Superjam ft. ?uestlove and very special guests
  - GZA performing "Liquid Swords" backed by Grupo Fantasma
- That Tent:
  - Pelican
  - Bad Brains
  - Flogging Molly
  - Puscifer
  - DANZIG LEGACY - featuring music by Danzig, Samhain and Danzig/Doyle performing The Misfits
  - Alice Cooper
  - Unchained "The Mighty Van Halen Tribute"
- The Other Tent:
  - Janka Nabay & the Bubu Gang
  - Debo Band
  - Khaira Arby & Her Band
  - La-33
  - Red Baraat
  - Spectrum Road ( Cindy Blackman Santana, Jack Bruce, John Medeski, and Vernon Reid)
  - Pedrito Martinez Group
- The Bonnaroo Comedy Theatre:
  - Colin Hay, Garfunkel and Oates, Mike O'Connell
  - Marc Maron, Judah Friedlander, & Amy Schumer
  - Rhys Darby & Reggie Watts
  - Steven Wright & Glenn Wool
- Café Where:
  - Bhi Bhiman
  - Sister Sparrow & the Dirty Birds
  - Jukebox the Ghost
  - James Wallace & the Naked Light
- The Great Taste Lounge Brewed by Miller Lite:
  - The Main Squeeze
  - Cosmic Suckerpunch
  - Wild Cub
  - LP
  - Tauk
  - Chuck Mead
  - Robert Ellis
  - The Stooges Brass Band
  - WE ARE AUGUSTINES
  - Art vs. Science
- Sonic Stage:
  - The Casey Dreissen Singularity
  - Trixie Whitley
  - Dawes
  - Hey Rosetta!
  - Trampled by Turtles
  - Oberhofer
  - North Mississippi Allstars Duo
  - Gary Clark Jr.
  - Art vs. Science
  - The Stooges Brass Band
- The Solar Stage:
  - Breakdancing
  - Dennis Casey & Bob Schmidt (Flogging Molly) -- RtE Interview
  - Chad Stokes(Dispatch), Matt Wilhelm (Calling All Crows) RtE interview/performance
  - ALO — RtE Interview & Performance
  - Red Baraat: RtE Interview & Performance
  - Hey Rosetta! RtE Interview & Performance
  - Andrea Bellanger
  - Mawre
  - Marina Orchestra
  - DJ TableSaw
  - Matt Sucich
  - The Carnivalesque Cabaret- Burlesque, Bellydance & Sideshow
- Cinema Tent:
  - American Splendor - Q&A with actor Judah Friedlander
  - #ReGENERATION - Q&A with director Philip Montgomery and producer Matt DeRoss
  - Charles Bradley: Soul of America with Introduction by documentary subject Charles Bradley
  - Thugs, The Musical
  - When Groucho Met Alice: Duck Soup - Introduction by Alice Cooper
  - SF Sketchfest Presents: Freak Dance – Q&A with Matt Besser
  - [adult swim] presents: things you've never seen
  - SF Sketchfest Presents Reggie Watts + Surprise Silent Film - Live Score Performed by Reggie Watts
  - Girl Walk//All Day
- The Silent Disco powered by Philips Citiscape Collection:
  - Wyllys
  - Penguin Prison / Body Language (DJ Set)
  - Brenton Duvall

=== Sunday, June 10 ===
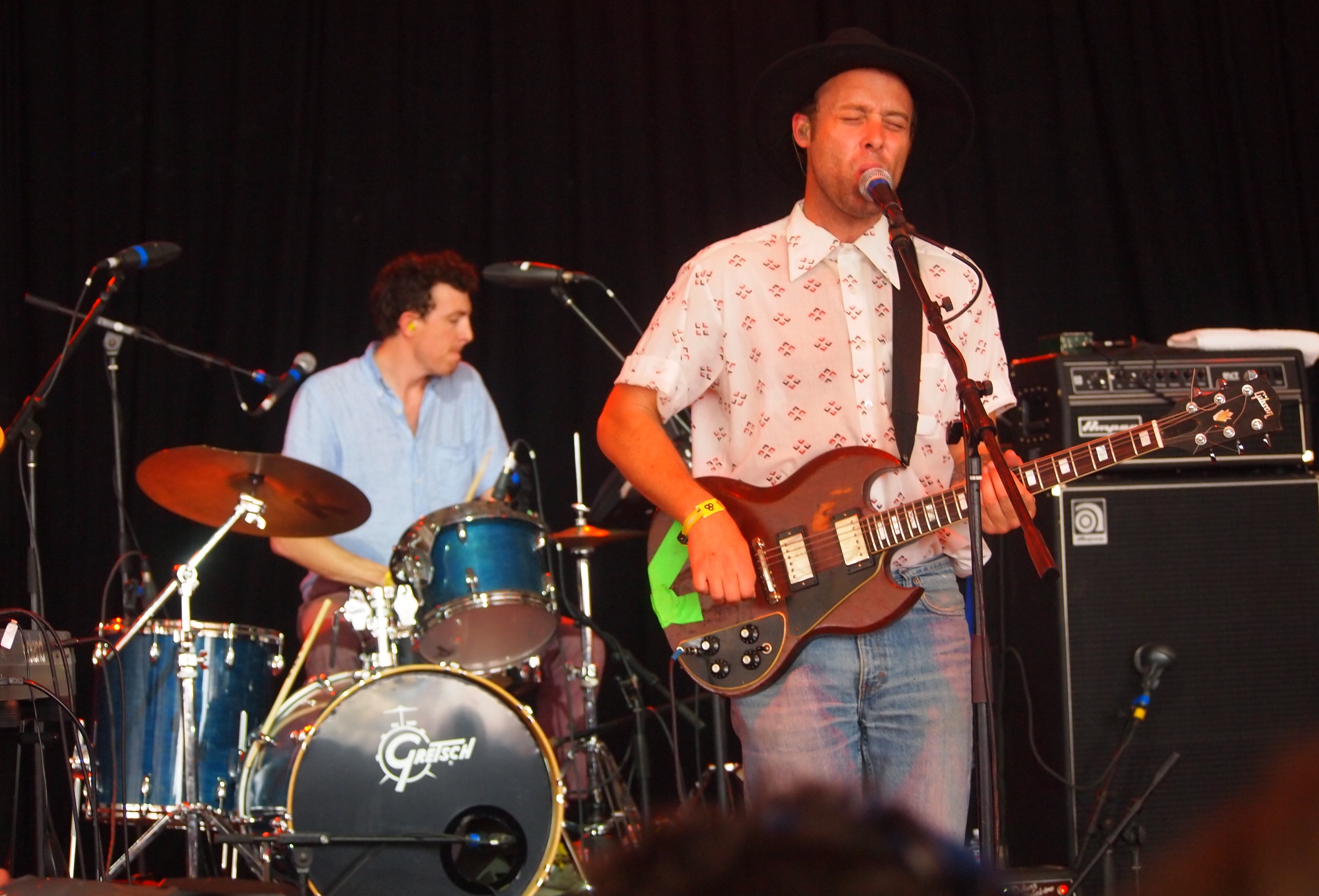
Here We Go Magic performing

- What Stage:
  - Gary Clark Jr.
  - The Beach Boys (Brian Wilson, Mike Love, Al Jardine, Bruce Johnston and David Marks)
  - Bon Iver
  - Phish
- Which Stage:
  - Delta Spirit
  - The Black Lips
  - Mac Miller
  - Ben Folds Five
  - The Shins
- This Tent:
  - ALO
  - Grouplove
  - The War on Drugs
  - The Joy Formidable
  - Young the Giant
- That Tent:
  - Black Box Revelation
  - Fruit Bats
  - Here We Go Magic
  - The Antlers
  - Kurt Vile and the Violators
  - fun.
- The Other Tent:
  - Sarah Jarosz
  - Kathleen Edwards
  - City and Colour
  - Kenny Rogers
  - The Civil Wars
- The Bonnaroo Comedy Theater:
  - Rhys Darby & Reggie Watts (2 sets)
  - Steven Wright & Glenn Wool
- Café Where:
  - Matt Sucich
  - Robert Francis
  - Machines Are People Too
- The Great Taste Lounge Brewed by Miller Lite:
  - Fly Golden Eagle
  - Honey Island Swamp Band
  - By Lightning!
  - The Silent Comedy
  - Yuna
  - The Staves
  - Bethesda
- Sonic Stage:
  - Sister Sparrow & the Dirty Birds
  - Red Baarat
  - Blind Pilot
  - WE ARE AUGUSTINES
  - ALO
  - Kathleen Edwards
  - Here We Go Magic
  - Chappo
  - The Silent Comedy
  - Brownout
- The Solar Stage:
  - Bhakti: RtE Interview & Performance
  - Stooges Brass Band RtE Interview & Performance
  - Honey Island Swamp Band: RtE Interview & Performance
  - Blind Pilot: RtE Interview & Performance
  - The Deep Dark Woods — RtE Interview & Performance
  - The Flavor Savers- Beard & Mustache Contest
  - Breakdancing
  - Andrea Bellanger
- Cinema Tent:
  - Green Screens presented by Rock the Earth: Last Call at the Oasis – Q&A with Lindsay Guetschow and David Whiteside
  - SF Sketchfest Presents the Best of Upright Citizens Brigade Comedy hosted by Matt Besser
  - Finding North – Intro by the Civil Wars, and Lindsay Guetschow of Participant Media
  - Weird Science
  - Advance Screening: Beasts of the Southern Wild
- The Silent Disco powered by Philips Citiscape Collection:
  - Body Language (DJ set)
