= 2019 Bonnaroo Music Festival =

The 2019 Bonnaroo Music Festival, the eighteenth consecutive edition of the festival, was held June 13 to 16, 2019, at the Great Stage Park Manchester, Tennessee. The tickets were sold out and it was projected that 80,000 people attended the festival across the weekend. The festival was headlined by two sets by Phish, Childish Gambino, Post Malone, Odesza, and The Lumineers.

== Set lists ==
Here are the lists of songs performed at the 2019 Bonnaroo by the headliners:

Phish (Friday set)
1. "Carini"
2. "Down with Disease"
3. "Say It to Me S.A.N.T.O.S."
4. "Everything's Right"
5. "Mercury"
6. "Tweezer"
7. "Also sprach Zarathustra, op. 30"
8. "Steam"
9. "Martian Monster"
10. "More"
11. "Harry Hood"
12. "Character Zero"

Encore

13. "Possum"
14. "Tweezer Reprise"
Childish Gambino
1. "Atavista"
2. "Algorhythm"
3. "Summertime Magic"
4. "The Worst Guys"
5. "Worldstar"
6. "Stand Tall"
7. "Boogieman"
8. "Have Some Love"
9. "Riot"
10. "Terrified"
11. "Feels Like Summer"
12. "Human Sacrifice"
13. "This Is America"
14. "Sober"
15. "3005"
16. "Sweatpants"
17. "Redbone"
Post Malone
1. "Too Young"
2. "Over Now"
3. "Better Now"
4. "No Option"
5. "Sugar Wraith"
6. "Zack and Codeine"
7. "Candy Paint"
8. "Wow"
9. "Psycho"
10. "Paranoid"
11. "I Fall Apart"
12. "Stay"
13. "Go Flex"
14. "White Iverson"
15. "Sunflower"
16. "Rockstar"
17. "Congratulations"
ODESZA
1. "Intro (A Moment Apart)"
2. "Bloom"
3. "Say My Name"
4. "The Loco-Motion"
5. "Late Night"
6. "One Day They'll Know"
7. "Boy"
8. "Higher Ground" (with Naomi Wild)
9. "La ciudad"
10. "Divide"
11. "Line of Sight" (with Rory Wynne)
12. "Meridian"
13. "Koto (VIP Edit)"
14. "Memories That You Call"
15. "Keep Her Close"
16. "If There's Time"
17. "Always This Late" / "Intro" / "How Did I Get Here"
18. "Don't Stop"
19. "Loyal"
20. "Falls" / "Across the Room"
21. "Sun Models"
22. "It's Only"
Phish (Sunday sets)

Set 1

1. "Set Your Soul Free"
2. "Blaze On"
3. "Death Don't Hurt Very Long"
4. "Reba"
5. "Free"
6. "Sand"
7. "Wolfman's Brother"
8. "Cavern"

Set 2

9. "Mike's Song"
10. "Fluffhead"
11. "Twist"
12. "Weekapaug Groove"
13. "No Men in No Man's Land"
14. "Fuego"
15. "Ghost"
16. "Bathtub Gin"

Encore

17. "Wilson"
18. "First Tube"
The Lumineers
1. "Sleep on the Floor"
2. "Cleopatra"
3. "Life in the City"
4. "Submarines"
5. "Leader of the Landslide"
6. "Angela"
7. "Flowers in Your Hair"
8. "Ho Hey"
9. "Slow It Down"
10. "Ophelia"
11. "Gloria"
12. "Big Parade"
13. "Gun Song"
14. "Donna"
15. "This Must Be the Place (Naive Melody)" (with Rayland Baxter)
16. "Stubborn Love"

Encore

17. "Walls (Circus)"

== Line-ups ==
The line-up for the 2019 festival was announced five months prior, on January 8, 2019. Esquire called the line-up "the weirdest one in years", criticized Post Malone and two Phish's headlining spots.

The information was obtained from BrooklynVegan website. Artists listed from earliest to latest set times.

=== Thursday, June 13 ===
- This Tent: Donna Missal, Jack Harlow, All Them Witches, Rolling Blackouts Coastal Fever, The Comet Is Coming, SunSquabi
- That Tent: Peach Pit, Caroline Rose, Grand Ole Opry, The Nude Party, Magic City Hippies, Saba
- The Other: Dorfex Bos, Hekler, Eprom, 12th Planet, Space Jesus B2B Eprom B2B Shlump
- Who Stage: Kalu & the Electric Joint, Drax Project, Mk.gee, Bülow, Friday Pilots Club, Evan Giia
- Silent Disco: Case Bloom, Shlump, DJ Mel

=== Friday, June 14 ===
- What Stage: Rival Sons, Catfish and the Bottlemen, The Avett Brothers, Childish Gambino, Phish
- Which Stage: The Teskey Brothers, Nahko and Medicine for the People, AJR, GRiZ, Solange, Brockhampton
- This Tent: Tyla Yaweh, Cherry Glazerr, Parquet Courts, K.Flay, Gojira, Beach House, GRiZ Super Jam
- That Tent: Monsieur Periné, Las Cafeteras, Ibeyi, Anoushka Shankar, Courtney Barnett, Deafheaven, Girl Talk
- The Other: Crooked Colours, Mersiv, Ducky, Medasin, Jade Cicada, Liquid Stranger, Nghtmre, RL Grime
- Who Stage: Ida Mae, Lola Kirke, Pinky Pinky, Los Colognes, SOAK, Illiterate Light, King Nun

=== Saturday, June 15 ===
- What Stage: The Record Company, Maren Morris, Hozier, Odesza, Post Malone
- Which Stage: Rubblebucket, Hippo Campus, Juice Wrld, Kacey Musgraves, The National, The Lonely Island
- This Tent: Little Simz, Chelsea Cutler, Bishop Briggs, Quinn XCII, Jim James, Clairo, Gucci Mane
- That Tent: Deva Mahal, Ruston Kelly, Unknown Mortal Orchestra, Shovels & Rope, John Prine, Joe Russo's Almost Dead
- The Other: DJ Mel, Memba, Whipped Cream, SNBRN, TOKiMONSTA, Space Jesus, Gramatik, Zhu
- Who Stage: Honey Harper, Sego, Delacey, The New Respects, Ximena Sariñana, Liily, Republican Hair

=== Sunday, June 16 ===
- What Stage: Trampled by Turtles, Brandi Carlile, The Lumineers, Phish (two sets)
- Which Stage: Ripe, The Soul Rebels, Hobo Johnson and the Lovemakers, Walk the Moon, Cardi B
- This Tent: Faye Webster, Two Feet, The Lemon Twigs, Lil Dicky, King Princess
- That Tent: Kikagaku Moyo, Bombino, Princess, The Wood Brothers, Mac DeMarco
- The Other: Iglooghost, Cid, Dombresky, AC Slater, G Jones, Illenium
- Who Stage: Sun Seeker, Jared & The Mill, Patrick Droney, I Dont Know How but They Found Me, Super Doppler, Golden West
