= A Different Ship =

Studio album by Here We Go Magic
- Released: May 8, 2012
- Genre: Indie rock
- Label: Secretly Canadian
- Producers: Nigel Godrich, Here We Go Magic

Here We Go Magic chronology
Pigeons (2010)	A Different Ship (2012)	Be Small (2015)

A Different Ship is the third album from American indie rock band Here We Go Magic, released by Secretly Canadian in May 2012. As he did on the band's first two albums (Here We Go Magic and Pigeons), Luke Temple filled the dual role of singer and songwriter. The band also teamed with producer Nigel Godrich (Radiohead, Pavement) for the first time.

== Reception ==
Professional ratings
Aggregate scores
Source	Rating
Metacritic	78/100
Review scores
Source	Rating
AllMusic	3/5 stars
The A.V. Club	C
Beats Per Minute	65%
Consequence of Sound	C+
Drowned in Sound	8/10
Filter	83%
Paste	8.1/10
Pitchfork Media	6.3/10
PopMatters	9/10 stars
Slant Magazine	2.5/5 stars
Under the Radar	7/10 stars

A Different Ship received positive reviews from critics. The album holds a score of 78/100 based on 29 reviews, indicating "generally favorable reviews".

== Track listing ==
No.	Title	Length
1.	"Intro"	0:51
2.	"Hard to Be Close"	3:47
3.	"Make Up Your Mind"	4:06
4.	"Alone But Moving"	3:57
5.	"I Believe in Action"	4:39
6.	"Over the Ocean"	4:26
7.	"Made to Be Old"	4:06
8.	"How Do I Know"	4:30
9.	"Miracle of Mary"	3:51
10.	"A Different Ship"	8:15
