= Be Small =

Studio album by Here We Go Magic
- Released: October 16, 2015
- Genre: Indie rock
- Label: Secretly Canadian
- Producer: Here We Go Magic

Here We Go Magic chronology
A Different Ship (2012)	Be Small (2015)

Be Small is the fourth full-length studio album from the indie rock band Here We Go Magic and was released by Secretly Canadian on October 16, 2015. Drawing inspiration from Brian Eno and John Cale's Wrong Way Up, as well as Robert Wyatt's Shleep, singer-songwriter Luke Temple began recording before enlisting the help of bandmate Michael Bloch. The two were then assisted by drummer Austin Vaughn and bassist Brian Betancourt, who helped to complete the record.

== Track listing ==
No.	Title	Length
1.	"Intro"	0:30
2.	"Stella"	4:30
3.	"Be Small"	3:50
4.	"Falling"	4:33
5.	"Candy Apple"	3:48
6.	"Girls in the Early Morning"	3:59
7.	"Tokyo London US Korea"	4:58
8.	"Wishing Well"	0:33
9.	"Ordinary Feeling"	5:33
10.	"News"	4:16
11.	"Dancing World"	4:44

== Reception ==
Professional ratings
Aggregate scores
Source	Rating
Metacritic	80/100
Review scores
Source	Rating
AllMusic	4/5 stars
DIY	2/5 stars
Under the Radar	8/10 stars

Critical reception for Be Small has been positive and the album holds a rating of 80 on Metacritic, based on 9 reviews. AllMusic rated the album at four stars, praising it as being "loaded with simply good, interesting songs." NME also gave a favorable review and awarded Be Small four out of five stars.
