= 2015 Bonnaroo Music Festival =

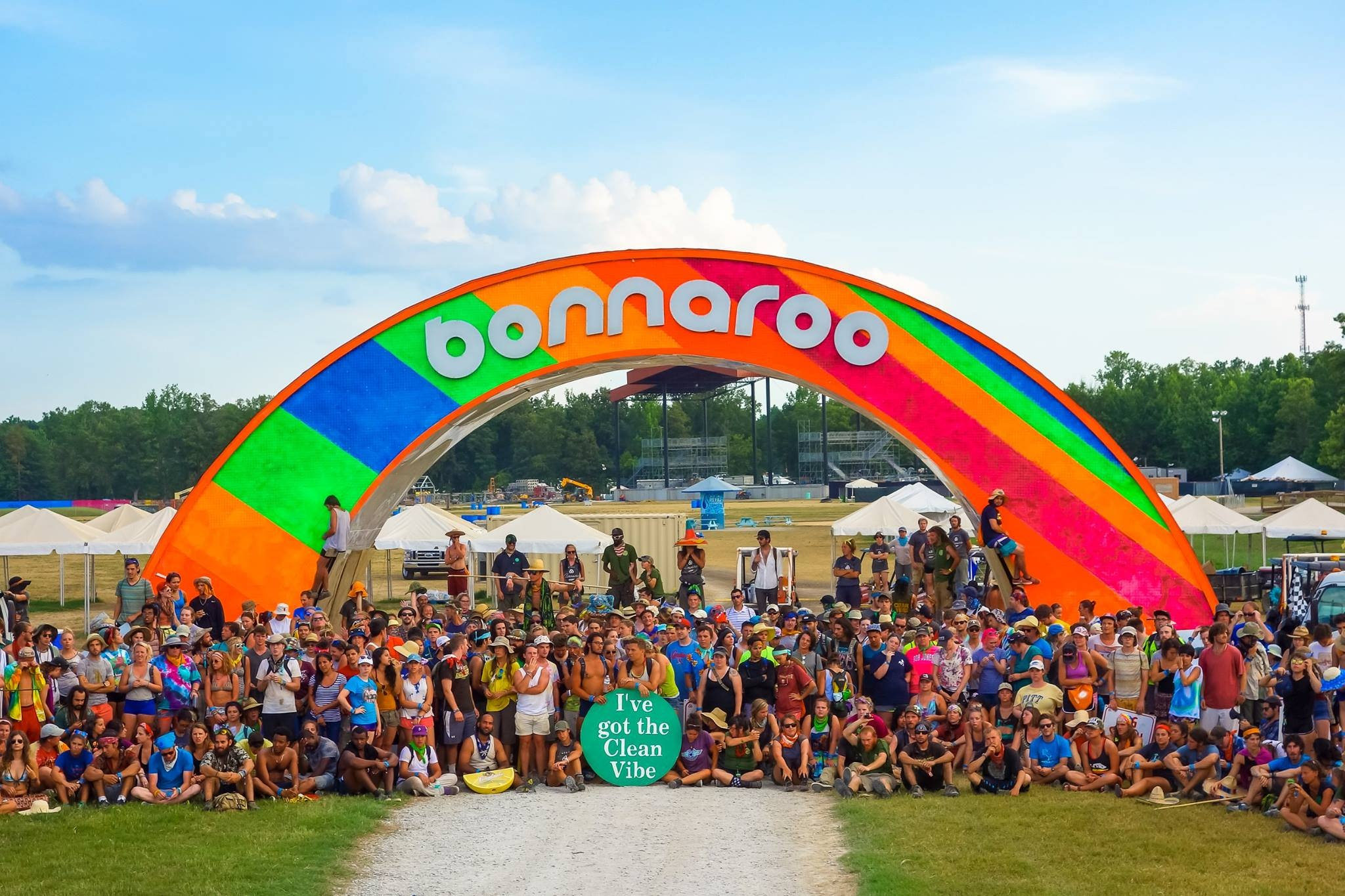

The 2015 Bonnaroo Music Festival was held in June 11–14, 2015 in Manchester, Tennessee. This marked the 14th time the festival has been held since its inception in 2002.

In mid-December 2014, Bonnaroo announced there would be clues hinting at which artists would be on the lineup for 2015. They posted "The 12 Days of RooClues" on their official Instagram and Snapchat. A segment on RooRadio later revealed that the answers to these clues were, Glass Animals, Sturgill Simpson, Dopapod, Houndmouth, Bleachers, Moon Taxi, Trampled By Turtles, Flume, The War on Drugs, Tears For Fears, Belle and Sebastian, and Robert Plant.

In mid-January 2015, the Bonnaroo lineup was officially announced by a process that fans called 'hotline' (1-844-ROO-2015) for learn the name of one artist on the official lineup, and subsequently shared it on social media using the hashtag "#Bonnaroo". The hotline was only open for a few hours on the date of the lineup announcement. Bonnaroo released an official lineup announcement video when all the artists had been shared by the fans on social media.

== Line-up ==
=== Thursday, June 11 ===
(artists listed from earliest to latest set times)

- This Tent:
  - Unlocking the Truth
  - Strand Of Oaks
  - Iceage
  - The Growlers
  - Courtney Barnett
  - Mac Demarco
- That Tent:
  - Dej Loaf
  - Dopapod
  - Houndmouth
  - Tove Lo
  - Jungle
- The Other Tent:
  - Ryn Weaver
  - Temples
  - Glass Animals
  - Benjamin Booker
  - Gramatik
- Comedy Theatre:
  - Kurt Braunohler, Cameron Esposito, Ron Funches, & Jamie Lee (2 sets)
  - Dan Soder, Big Jay Oakerson, Ari Shaffir, & Robert Kelly (2 sets)
- New Music On Tap Lounge brewed by Miller Lite:
  - Radiolucent
  - Future Thieves
  - Dark Waves
  - Ximena Sariñana
  - Broncho
- The Who Stage (Communion Music):
  - Parlour Tricks
  - Little May
  - Raury
  - Bear's Den
  - Rubblebucket
- Silent Disco:
  - Quickie Mart
  - The Unsheathed
  - Matoma
  - Quickie Mart
- Cinema Tent:
  - Green Screens Presented by Rock The Earth: After the Spill - Q&A with director Jon Bowermaster
  - Trainwreck - Advance Screening
  - HBO Presents: Game of Thrones Season 5, Episode 6 (Unbowed, Unbent, Unbroken)
  - NBA Finals Game 4
  - Back to the Future 30th Anniversary Quote-Along Screening
  - Enchantment Under The Sea Dance Party - Love Music
  - [IFC] and The Action Pack Present: R. Kelly’s Trapped in the Closet 10th Anniversary Sing-Along
- Solar Stage:
  - Bonnaroots Dinner (with music from Wailing Loons)
  - Raising Caine
- Snake & Jake's Christmas Club Barn
  - Tiki Disco
  - New Breed Brass Band
  - Full Service Party
  - Snicklefritz
  - Tiki Disco

=== Friday, June 12 ===
(artists listed from earliest to latest set times)

- What Stage:
  - SOJA
  - Dawes
  - Alabama Shakes
  - Kendrick Lamar
  - Deadmau5
- Which Stage:
  - Brownout Presents Brown Sabbath
  - Royal Blood
  - Moon Taxi
  - Atmosphere
  - Ben Harper and the Innocent Criminals
  - Earth Wind & Fire
- This Tent:
  - Tanya Tagaq
  - Against Me!
  - Guster
  - Tears For Fears
  - Run the Jewels
  - Odesza
- That Tent:
  - Pallbearer
  - Between the Buried & Me
  - Rustie
  - Kacey Musgraves
  - Medeski, Scofield, Martin, & Wood
  - STS9
- The Other Tent:
  - The Districts
  - King Gizzard & the Lizard Wizard
  - Unknown Mortal Orchestra
  - Sylvan Esso
  - Ben Folds & YMusic
  - Flying Lotus
- Comedy Theatre:
  - Kurt Braunohler, Cameron Esposito, Ron Funches, & Matt McCarthy
  - Kurt Braunohler, Cameron Esposito, Ron Funches, & Jamie Lee
  - Nick Thune, Natasha Leggero, Ian Edwards, & Michelle Wolf (2 sets)
- New Music On Tap Lounge brewed by Miller Lite:
  - Fruition
  - The Jason McMillan Band
  - Tor Miller
  - Boy Named Banjo
  - Homemade Wine
  - BC Camplight
  - The Dø
- The Who Stage:
  - Nothing More
  - Joel Woods
  - Elle King
  - Mini Mansions
  - Gabriel Garzón-Montano
  - Clear Plastic Masks
  - Twiddle
  - Hudson K
- Silent Disco:
  - Motion Potion
  - Attom
  - The Unsheathed
  - Motion Potion
  - Matoma
  - DJ Prince Hakim
- Cinema Tent:
  - Green Screens Presented by Rock The Earth: Merchants of Doubt - Q&A with producer Melissa Robeldo and former Congressman Bob Inglis
  - The Ultimate Corey Feldman Party: The Goonies 30th Anniversary Quote-Along screening
  - The Ultimate Corey Feldman Party: Live Performance: Corey Feldman & the Angels
  - The Ultimate Corey Feldman Party: The Lost Boys Quote-Along screening
  - Being Evel - advance screening
  - HBO Presents: Game of Thrones Season 5, Episode 7 (The Gift)
  - Austin to Boston - Introduction by Mumford & Sons' Ben Lovett, director Marcus Haney, and producer/editor Ty Johnson
  - Back to the Future Part II
  - Clueless 20th Anniversary Quote-Along screening
- Solar Stage:
  - Vinyasa Kevin Courtney
  - Vinyasa Kevin Courtney
  - Adam Gardner (Guster) Rock the Earth Interview
  - Heritage Radio Burned: Stories of Food Truck Fails & Fixes
  - Schlafly: Localism and Its Effect on the Craft Beer Movement
  - Big Freedia: A Red Bull Music Academy Conversation
  - Bonnaroots Dinner with music from Wailing Loons
- Snake & Jake's Christmas Club Barn:
  - Full Service Party
  - New Breed Brass Band
  - Full Service Party
  - Full Service Party
  - Jon Cleary & the Absolute Monster Gentlemen
  - Tiki Disco
  - Tropical Party (Tiki Disco)
  - Tiki Disco

=== Saturday, June 13 ===
(artists listed from earliest to latest set times)

- What Stage:
  - Trampled By Turtles
  - Hozier
  - My Morning Jacket
  - Mumford & Sons
- Which Stage:
  - Songhoy Blues
  - Rhiannon Giddens
  - The War on Drugs
  - Gary Clark Jr.
  - Childish Gambino
  - Bassnectar
- This Tent:
  - Priory
  - Catfish and the Bottlemen
  - Woods
  - Bleachers
  - Belle and Sebastian
  - Slayer
  - D'Angelo and the Vanguard
- That Tent:
  - Jon Cleary & the Absolute Monster Gentlemen
  - Gregory Alan Isakov
  - Bahamas
  - Sturgill Simpson
  - Atomic Bomb! Who Is William Onyeabor? Feat. Jamie Lidell, Charles Lloyd, Luke Jenner, Money Mark, Pat Mahoney, Sinkane, & Mike Floss
  - Tycho
  - Flume
- The Other Tent:
  - So Percussion
  - Phox
  - SZA
  - Jamie xx
  - SBTRKT
  - Throwback Superjam Dance Party featuring Pretty Lights, Run DMC, Rob Trujillo, Jack Antonoff, Chance the Rapper, Reggie Watts, Eric Krasno, Jamie Lidell, John Medeski, Karl Denson, Oteil Burbridge, Robert Searight, Brian Coogan, & Brownout Horns - with special guests Cherub, Rhiannon Giddens and more!
- Comedy Theatre:
  - Ralphie May, Jeff Ross, & Mark Normand (2 sets)
  - Chris Hardwick & April Richardson (2 sets)
- New Music On Tap Lounge brewed by Miller Lite:
  - Son Little
  - Kevin Garrett
  - Kandace Springs
  - Wild Adriatic
  - Highly Suspect
  - Mispers
  - Smooth Hound Smith
- The Who Stage:
  - Jesse Terry
  - Kaleo
  - Phoebe Ryan
  - Falls
  - X Ambassadors
  - Basecamp
  - All Them Witches
- Silent Disco:
  - E.Feld
  - Snicklefritz
  - Tiki Disco
  - DJ Logic
  - Different Sleep
  - Nuri
  - Childish Major
  - El Dusty
  - Mike Gao
- Cinema Tent:
  - Heartworn Highways Revisited - Screening, Q&A with director Wayne Price and Live Music with Bobby Bare Jr., Shelly Colvin, and Jonny Fritz
  - Birdman - Film + Live Drum Score Performance by Antonio Sánchez
  - Sex & Drugs & Rock & Roll - Q&A with Denis Leary, Elizabeth Gillies, and Robert Kelly
  - HBO Presents: Game of Thrones Season 5, Episode 8 (Hardhome)
  - Mean Girls Quote-Along screening
  - Salad Days: A Decade of Punk in Washington DC (1980-1990)
  - Back to the Future Part III
  - Zoolander Quote-Along screening
- Solar Stage:
  - Vinyasa Alison Cramer
  - Meditation with The Art of Living
  - Vinyasa Alison Cramer (with DJ)
  - Taylor & Griffin Goldsmith (of Dawes) Rock the Earth Interview & Performance
  - Heritage Radio Wasted: Drinking Stories & Sustainability
  - Lagunitas: Hop Vapin'
  - Cider Relay Competition Presented by Angry Orchard Hard Cider
  - Bonnaroots Dinner with music from Wailing Loons
- Snake & Jake's Christmas Club Barn:
  - Full Service Party
  - NOLA Bounce Party (Full Service Party)
  - Full Service Party
  - Full Service Party
  - Vogue Dance-Off (Full Service Party)
  - Robe Rage (with special guest band)
  - 90's Rave Party (Full Service Party)

=== Sunday, June 14 ===
(artists listed from earliest to latest set times)

- What Stage:
  - Twenty One Pilots
  - Spoon
  - Florence and the Machine
  - Billy Joel
- Which Stage:
  - Pokey Lafarge
  - Madisen Ward and the Mama Bear
  - AWOLNATION
  - Brandi Carlile
  - Robert Plant & the Sensational Space Shifters
- This Tent:
  - Christopher Denny
  - Hiss Golden Messenger
  - The Very Best
  - Rudimental
  - G-Eazy
- That Tent:
  - Shakey Graves
  - Hurray for the Riff Raff
  - Béla Fleck & Abigail Washburn
  - Jerry Douglas Presents Earls of Leicester
  - Punch Brothers
  - The Lonesome Trio
  - The Bluegrass Situation SuperJam hosted by Ed Helms
- The Other Tent:
  - Jessica Hernandez & the Deltas
  - Shabazz Palaces
  - MØ
  - Freddie Gibbs & Madlib
  - Caribou
  - HBO Now Presents: Game of Thrones Season 5 Finale (Mother's Mercy)
- Comedy Theatre:
  - Reggie Watts & Matt McCarthy (2 sets)
- New Music On Tap Lounge brewed by Miller Lite:
  - Chrome Pony
  - Future Unlimited
  - Sol Cat
  - Mick Jenkins
- Silent Disco:
  - DJ Logic
- The Who Stage:
  - Grey Season
  - De Lux
  - Knox Hamilton
  - A Thousand Horses
  - The Wind and the Wave
  - Betty Who
- Cinema Tent:
  - Béla Fleck: How To Write a Banjo Concerto - Screening, Q&A, and Live Performance
  - Jaco - screening and Q&A with director Paul Marchand and producer Robert Trujillo
  - Eden - advanced screening
  - HBO presents: Game of Thrones Season 5, Episode 9 (The Dance of Dragons)
  - NBA Finals Game 5
- Solar Stage:
  - Breathing with The Art of Living
  - The Lone Bellow (Performance & Interview)
  - Roadkill Ghost Choir (Performance & Interview)
  - Music For Social Change (The Black Lillies & special guests, presented by Oxfam)
  - Carolina Chocolate Drops (Performance & Interview)
  - The Sweet Treats
  - Booker T: A Red Bull Music Academy Conversation
  - Discussion with Appalachian Citizens' Law Center
  - Mawre (African Drum/Dance)
- Sonic Stage:
  - Vinyasa Sheri Celentano
  - Breathing with Isha Foundation
  - Vinyasa Sheri Celentano
  - Gregory Alan Isakov Rock the Earth Interview & Performance
  - Heritage Radio Crowd Sourced: An Open Mic for Food Rants, Raves, & Readings
  - 2nd Annual Broo'ers Superjam with Musical Guests
  - Hurray for the Riff Raff Rock the Earth Interview & Performance
  - Global Citizen Special Performance
  - The Sweet Treats Featuring members of Raising Caine
- Snake & Jake's Christmas Club Barn:
  - Full Service Party
  - Classic Hip Hop Party (Full Service Party)
  - Dance Hall Reggae (Full Service Party)
  - Full Service Party
