= Exit 111 Festival =

Music festival in Manchester, Tennessee

The Exit 111 Festival was a music festival that was held from October 11 to 13, 2019 at Great Stage Park in Manchester, Tennessee, the site of the annual Bonnaroo festival. The festival, which takes its name from its proximity to the Exit 111 interchange on Interstate 24, consisted mostly of hard rock and heavy metal artists, with Guns N' Roses headlining on Sunday, Def Leppard on Saturday, and Lynyrd Skynyrd on Friday.

== Description ==
The festival, announced in April 2019, consisted of performances by multiple artists including Guns N' Roses, Def Leppard, Lynyrd Skynyrd, ZZ Top, Slayer, Deftones, Ghost, Mastodon and many more. Anthrax was announced as a replacement for Megadeth, who had to cancel due to lead vocalist and guitarist Dave Mustaine being diagnosed with throat cancer. The event also consisted of a car show and motocross demo, and be hosted by former Metal Show host Eddie Trunk. It was announced on November 29, 2019, that the festival would not be returning in 2020.
