= Good Mood Fool =

Studio album by Luke Temple
- Released: October 15, 2013
- Studio: Outlier Inn in Catskill Mountains, New York
- Genre: Indie rock
- Length: 38:47
- Label: Secretly Canadian
- Producer: Josh Druckman, Luke Temple

Luke Temple chronology
Don't Act Like You Don't Care (2011)	Good Mood Fool (2013)	A Hand Through the Cellar Door (2016)

Professional ratings
Aggregate scores
Source	Rating
Metacritic	73/100
Review scores
Source	Rating
AllMusic	4/5 stars
Consequence of Sound	C−
Drowned in Sound	7/10
NME	4/5 stars
Pitchfork	6.5/10
PopMatters	7/10

Good Mood Fool is the third solo album from Luke Temple of Here We Go Magic. The album was released by Secretly Canadian in October 2013. Luke wrote the album in a cottage in upstate New York in the winter of 2013, where he was joined by Mike Johnson of Dirty Projectors and Eliot Krimsky of Glass Ghost.

== Track listing ==
No.	Title	Length
1.	"Hard Working Hand"	3:43
2.	"Katie"	4:31
3.	"Florida"	4:25
4.	"Those Kids"	4:05
5.	"Jessica Brown Findlay"	4:12
6.	"Sue"	3:22
7.	"Terrified Witness"	4:29
8.	"Love Won't Receive"	6:23
9.	"Hardest Working Self Made Mexican"	3:37

== Personnel ==
- Luke Temple - bass, drum machine, engineer, guitar, producer, synthesizer, vocals
- Mike Johnson - drum machine, drums, percussion
- Eliot Krimsky - sampling, synthesizer
- Binki Shapiro - vocals
- Alan Hampton - bass
- Aerial East - background vocals
- Josh Druckman - engineer, producer
- Daniel Schlett - mixing
- Dusdin Condren - photography
- Nancy Dwyer - title
