= Here We Go Magic (album) =

Studio album by Here We Go Magic
- Released: 2009
- Genre: Indie rock, Indie folk, Ambient
- Length: 38:46
- Label: Western Vinyl
- Producer: Luke Temple

Here We Go Magic chronology
| Here We Go Magic (2009) | Pigeons (2010) |

Here We Go Magic is the 2009 debut album from Brooklyn-based indie rock band Here We Go Magic, recorded mostly by the band's lead singer Luke Temple.

== Background and recording ==
The album was recorded by Temple at home on a 4-track recorder over a two-month period. Temple described the recording: "I just had one tom, one microphone, a synth and an acoustic guitar. I didn’t have a full drum kit or normal bass, it was just all synth stuff that I did myself."

== Critical reception ==
Professional ratings
Aggregate scores
| Source | Rating |
|---|---|
| Metacritic | 72/100 |
Review scores
| Source | Rating |
| AllMusic | 3.5/5 stars |
| Drowned in Sound | 7/10 |
| Glide | 4/5 stars |
| NME | 7/10 stars |
| Pitchfork Media | 7.4/10 |
| Prefix Magazine | 6.5/10 |
| The Quietus | (favourable) |
| SPIN | 7/10 stars |
| Under the Radar | 8/10 |

Tim DiGravina, writing for AllMusic, gave the album a 3.5/5 rating, saying "There's a lot to admire in Here We Go Magic's dreamy, hazy melodies, and it's easy to get lost in the repetitive, minimalist guitar strumming that centers half of the tracks". Brian Gearing of Glide, gave it a four-star rating, calling it "hypnotic from the opening notes to the closing silence", and stating that it "doesn’t just sound awesome; it compels you to listen". The NME's Rob Webb was also impressed, giving the album 7/10. Eric Harvey of Pitchfork Media described the album as "hazy electronic textures, endlessly-spiraling lyrical loops, occasional forays into extended sections of ambience and noise", giving the album 7.4 out of 10. Alex Denney, writing for The Quietus, wrote "There isn't a duff moment on ...Magic exactly, but it's the opening salvo, with its lingering impression of small ideas stretched gauzily out, that really sings like firing synapses and leaves you wanting more". Barry Walters of SPIN gave it 7/10, calling it "Magic indeed".

== Track listing ==
1. "Only Pieces" (3:50)
2. "Fangela" (5:32)
3. "Ahab" (3:37)
4. "Tunnelvision" (4:23)
5. "Ghost List" (4:23)
6. "I Just Want to See You Underwater" (4:49)
7. "Babyohbaby - Ijustcantstanditanymore!" (2:07)
8. "Nat's Alien" (4:27)
9. "Everything's Big" (5:28)
