= The Dirty Guv'nahs =

American rock band

- Origin: Knoxville, Tennessee
- Genres: Southern rock, alternative country
- Years active: 2006–2015, 2018-present
- Label: Dualtone Records
- Members: James Trimble; Aaron Hoskins; Justin Hoskins; Michael Jenkins; Cozmo Holloway; Kevin Hyfantis
- Website: www.thedirtyguvnahs.com

The Dirty Guv'nahs is an American Southern rock band from Knoxville, Tennessee. Known for enthusiastic live shows, the band was continually named the Best Band in Knoxville by readers of the alternative newspaper, Metro Pulse. Having gained a regional following in the Southeast, the band made multiple appearances at festivals and released four studio albums. Their last album, Hearts on Fire, was released on March 11, 2014. The group disbanded in 2015 and reformed in 2018. The group released a new album in 2021, and the first single from the album was released in November 2020.

The Dirty Guv'nahs' songs are represented by Downtown Music Publishing and have been featured on ABC, NBC, Fox, CBS, ESPN, WFN, and the NFL Network.

== History ==
The six-piece band formed as a joke, when bassist Justin Hoskins volunteered his non-existent band to open a local concert. Hoskins had less than one week to put a band together and learn material for the show. The initial members all had a mutual friend nicknamed "The Guv'nah"(Richard Baird). Beginning performances in April 2006, the band's reputation grew within its native Knoxville. The band released its self-titled first album on August 11, 2009.

The band recorded its follow-up at Levon Helm Studios in Woodstock, New York. The album, Youth Is In Our Blood was released in 2010 and featured the singles "We'll Be The Light," "Wide Awake," and "Baby We Were Young." The album drew comparisons to southern rock band The Black Crowes and propelled the band to slots opening for the Zac Brown Band, Taj Mahal, and Grace Potter and the Nocturnals, as well as appearances at Bonnaroo, Wakarusa, and South by Southwest. The band continued a relationship with Helm until his death, playing multiple "Midnight Rambles" at his home in Woodstock and often guesting with the Rock and Roll Hall of Famer on his classic song The Weight.

The band financed the recording of its third album through a Kickstarter campaign in which it asked fans to pledge $20,000 to cover the initial cost. The funding was acquired within three days, months ahead of the expected deadline. The band then announced on its Facebook page the release of Somewhere Beneath These Southern Skies. The lead single, "3000 Miles" was added to AAA playlists on July 16, 2012. The tour for this album included shows with Wilco, The Black Crowes, and Needtobreathe.

The band's latest album, Hearts on Fire, debuted at #1 on the Billboard Heatseekers chart in March 2014. The album also spent one week on the Billboard 200, peaking at #107.

Citing a desire to spend more time with family, on May 12, 2015, the band announced their farewell tour. Their last concert took place on September 25, 2015.

The Dirty Guv'nahs announced that they will play two shows in 2018. On April 27 at Knoxville's the Mill & Mine and on April 13 at the Variety Playhouse in Atlanta. In an email announcing the two 2018 shows, the band members said they miss their fans and the brotherhood they had together.

"After two and a half long years of hibernation, we've decided to bring rock and roll back to the people," the band said in an email. "Facts are facts. We miss being with our fans, and we miss the brotherhood we had when we were playing shows. What better time than now?"

Tickets for the shows went on sale January 12, and quickly sold out. Tickets for the Atlanta show are going for as much as $200 already, showing that demand for the Guv's is still high.

The Dirty Guv'nahs posted via social media on May 22, 2019 that new music will be released in the fall of the year. Fans are clamoring for a tour to follow.

A new album named "Revival", will be released in 2021 and the band will share some of the songs along the way. The band have shared four song titles so far and released first single "Backbeat Melody" November 20, 2020. Secondhand single “Joy Takes a Little While” was released February 4, 2021.

== Discography ==
Studio albums

- Don't Need No Money (2008)
- The Dirty Guv'nahs (2009)
- Youth is in Our Blood (2010)
- Somewhere Beneath These Southern Skies (2012)
- Hearts on Fire (2014) U.S. #107
- Rock & Roll for the People (2016)
- Revival (2021)

Singles and EPs

- "We'll Be The Light" (2010)
- "Wide Awake" (2010)
- "3000 Miles" (2012)
- "Morning Light" (2014)
- "The Benediction" (2015)
- "Joy Takes a Little While" (2021)
- "Put the Hours In" (2026)

Live albums

- Live from Knoxville (2013)
