= 2002 Bonnaroo Music Festival =

In the inaugural year, the Bonnaroo Music Festival was held June 21–23. More than 70,000 tickets sold out in advance.

== Lineup ==
=== June 21st ===
(artists listed from earliest to latest set times)

- What Stage:
  - Dirty Dozen Brass Band
  - DJ Logic
  - Les Claypool's Flying Frog Brigade
  - Amon Tobin
  - Widespread Panic
- Which Stage:
  - Old Crow Medicine Show
  - Soulive
  - Ween
  - Gov't Mule
- This Tent:
  - Jim White
  - Umphrey's McGee
  - Gran Torino
  - Keller Williams Incident
- That Tent:
  - The Big Wu
  - Donna the Buffalo
  - Acoustic Syndicate
  - Karl Denson's Tiny Universe
- Cinema Tent:
  - U2: Rattle and Hum
  - The Grateful Dead Movie
  - The Harder They Come
  - The Earth Will Swallow You
  - Bittersweet Motel
  - Inside Out
  - Dont Look Back
  - Stop Making Sense

=== June 22nd ===
(artists listed from earliest to latest set times)

- What Stage:
  - Blackalicious
  - Ben Harper
  - Cut Chemist
  - The String Cheese Incident
  - Widespread Panic
- Which Stage:
  - John Butler Trio
  - Jack Johnson
  - Jurassic 5
- This Tent:
  - The Del McCoury Band
  - Drums & Tuba
  - Lil' Rascals Brass Band
  - The Disco Biscuits
  - Galactic
- That Tent:
  - Llama
  - Col. Bruce Hampton and The Codetalkers
  - Particle
  - Colonel Claypool's Bucket of Bernie Brains
  - moe.
- Cinema Tent:
  - Bob Marley: Time Will Tell
  - Buena Vista Social Club
  - The Last Waltz
  - Pleasure and Pain/Ben Harper
  - Gov't Mule Documentary
  - This Is Spinal Tap
  - The Rocky Horror Picture Show
  - The Wall

=== June 23rd ===
(artists listed from earliest to latest set times)

- What Stage:
  - Vinroc
  - Ween
  - Phil Lesh and Friends with Bob Weir
  - DJ Z-Trip
  - Trey Anastasio
- Which Stage:
  - Corey Harris
  - North Mississippi Allstars
  - Béla Fleck and Edgar Meyer
- This Tent:
  - Mofro
  - RANA
  - Gabe Dixon
  - Norah Jones
- That Tent:
  - Robert Randolph and the Family Band
  - Campbell Brothers
  - Dottie Peoples
  - Blind Boys of Alabama
- Cinema Tent:
  - The Blues Brothers
  - Tommy
  - Evolution
  - The Cable Guy
  - CB4
  - Scratch

== Superjam ==
(Core band members only, guests not included)

Michael Kang (violin and electric mandolin), Bela Fleck (electric synth-banjo), Jeff Raines (acoustic guitar), and Robert Randolph (pedal steel guitar)
