= Jonathan Mayers =

American music promoter (1974–2025)

Jonathan Mayers (1974 – June 10, 2025) was an American music promoter who was the co-founder of Bonnaroo and Outside Lands. Mayers was born in New York City in 1974. He graduated from Tulane University in New Orleans. Mayers died on June 10, 2025 at the age of 51 due to a heart attack in his hometown of New York City.

== Sources ==
- Sabin, Jonathan (1 May 2006). "The Temptation Of Superfly". Fast Company. Accessible via The Wikipedia Library
