= Rollin' In The Hay =

American alternative bluegrass band

Rollin' In The Hay is an American alternative bluegrass band from Birmingham, Alabama. The group has self-released six CDs and also has created 15 nationally released instrumental tributes called the Pickin' On series. The band is listed in the Alabama Music Hall of Fame as "Music Achievers".

== History ==
Rollin' In The Hay was founded in 1993, and first performed in 1994, starting out in local clubs, including the War Eagle Supper Club in Auburn. In 2001, they were a featured band on the Pickin' on Widespread Panic: A Bluegrass Tribute album, and they also appeared in the 2002 followup Pickin' on Travis Tritt: A Tribute.

The band continued to perform around the Southern states, while recording and self-releasing six albums.

In 2012, after winning a band contest, the Rollin' In The Hay performed at the Bonnaroo Music Festival.

The band performed at the 2015 Briar Patch Festival in Damascus.

== Current members ==
- Rick Carter – vocals and guitar
- Stan Foster – vocals and electric bass
- Johnny (Fontana) Kulinich – guitar and mandolin
- Leif Bondarenko – drums
- Brooks Hubbert – Bad to the Bone (Period)
