= Fenceline =

Studio album by Mildred
- Released: April 24, 2026
- Genre: Indie rock
- Length: 37:52
- Label: Memorials of Distinction / Dog Day Press

Fenceline is the debut album by American rock band Mildred. It released on April 24, 2026, through Memorials of Distinction and Dog Day Press.

== Reception ==
Pitchfork gave the album a 7.7 out of 10, with reviewer Grayson Haver Currin writing that the album is, "one of the year’s most endearing and disarming indie rock records".

== Track listing ==
All tracks are written by Mildred.

No.	Title	Length
1.	"UPS Brown"	4:43
2.	"Fish Sticks"	2:58
3.	"Charlie"	3:25
4.	"Cobwebs"	3:16
5.	"Fenceline"	3:35
6.	"Fleet Week"	2:48
7.	"Aquinas"	4:07
8.	"Mumblecore Melody"	5:26
9.	"Pitch Boats"	3:31
10.	"Hardcore of Beauty"	3:58
Total length:		37:52

== Personnel ==
- Henry Easton Koehler—vocals, guitar
- Jack Schrott—vocals, guitar, cover art
- Matt Palmquist—vocals, bass, woodwinds, album layout
- Will Fortna—drums, production, mixing, recording
- Luke Temple—recording
- Jack Ogborne—recording
- Jason Mitchell—mastering
