= 2003 Bonnaroo Music Festival =

The festival ran June 13–15, and 80,000 attended. In 2003, The Bonnaroo organizers planned a festival called Bonnaroo Northeast to take place in Riverhead, Long Island, New York. This festival, as well as the Field Day Festival, another festival to take place at the same site, were cancelled, however, in the weeks leading up to the event due to concern about securing permits in time.

== Lineup ==
=== Friday, June 13 ===
(artists listed from earliest to latest set times)

- What Stage:
  - RJD2
  - Jack Johnson
  - DJ Spooky
  - Ben Harper & the Innocent Criminals
  - Kid Koala
  - Neil Young & Crazy Horse
- Which Stage:
  - Antibalas Afrobeat Orchestra
  - Yonder Mountain String Band
  - Lucinda Williams
  - Béla Fleck and the Flecktones
- This Tent:
  - Rebirth Brass Band
  - Jason Mraz
  - Joshua Redman
  - Keller Williams
  - The Funky Meters
- That Tent:
  - My Morning Jacket
  - Ben Kweller
  - Tortoise
  - Sonic Youth
  - Sound Tribe Sector 9
- The Other Tent:
  - Gavin Degraw
  - Ekoostik Hookah
  - Sticky Fingers
  - Soft Parade
- Cinema Tent:
  - Kids in the Hall: Brain Candy
  - Chris Rock: Bring the Pain
  - Robin Williams on Broadway
  - Jackass: The Movie
  - Car Wash
  - 2003 NBA Finals Game 5
  - Caddyshack
  - Amandla!: A Revolution in Four-Part Harmony
  - Austin City Limits - Beck with The Flaming Lips

=== Saturday, June 14 ===
(artists listed from earliest to latest set times)

- What Stage:
  - Wailers Band
  - Emmylou Harris
  - Phonosycograph DJ Disk
  - The Allman Brothers Band
  - DJ Z-Trip
  - Widespread Panic
  - Mark Farina
- Which Stage:
  - Robinella and the CCstringband
  - Nickel Creek
  - The Roots
  - Robert Randolph and the family
- This Tent:
  - Liz Phair
  - Jon Cleary & the Absolute Monster Gentlemen
  - Cyro Baptista's Beat the Donkey
  - Leo Kottke & Mike Gordon
  - Medeski Martin & Wood
- That Tent:
  - Kaki King
  - Trachtenburg Family Slideshow Players
  - The Polyphonic Spree
  - Garage A Trois
  - The Flaming Lips
  - Particle
- The Other Tent:
  - Jerry Joseph & The Jackmormons
  - Josh Kelley
  - Mr. Brownstone
  - The Machine
- Cinema Tent:
  - Dogtown and Z-Boys
  - Pee Wee's Big Adventure
  - Time Bandits
  - Scratch
  - Eddie Murphy Raw
  - The Nightmare Before Christmas
  - The Rocky Horror Picture Show
  - Pootie Tang
  - Star Wars
  - The Empire Strikes Back

=== Sunday, June 15 ===
(artists listed from earliest to latest set times)

- What Stage:
  - Warren Haynes
  - Josh Wink
  - Galactic
  - DJ Z-Trip
  - James Brown
  - Mixmaster Mike
  - The Dead
- Which Stage:
  - The New Deal
  - North Mississippi Allstars
  - G. Love & Special Sauce
  - moe.
- This Tent:
  - The Slip
  - Drive-By Truckers
  - Spearhead
  - SuperJam
- That Tent:
  - Topaz
  - O.A.R.
  - Vusi Mahlasela of Amandla!
  - Toots and the Maytals
- The Other Tent:
  - Buddahead
  - RAQ
  - Zoso
- Cinema Tent:
  - Jerry Seinfeld: I'm Telling You for the Last Time
  - Enter the Dragon
  - The Warriors
  - Standing in the Shadows of Motown
  - 2003 NBA Finals Game 6
  - Spaceballs

== Superjam ==
(Core band members only, guests not included)

Dr. John (grand Piano/hammond b-3 and vocals), Mike Gordon (bass) Luther Dickinson (guitar and vocals), Stanton Moore (drums)
