= Pigeons (album) =

Studio album by Here We Go Magic
- Released: June 8, 2010
- Genre: Indie rock
- Length: 47:44
- Label: Secretly Canadian
- Producer: Here We Go Magic

Here We Go Magic chronology
Here We Go Magic (2009)	Pigeons (2010)	A Different Ship (2012)

Pigeons is the second album from Brooklyn-based indie rock band Here We Go Magic and was released via Secretly Canadian in June 2010.

== Critical reception ==
Professional ratings
Aggregate scores
Source	Rating
Metacritic	70/100
Review scores
Source	Rating
AllMusic	3/5 stars
NME	7/10 stars
Pitchfork Media	7.5/10
Slant	2.5/5 stars

Regarding Here We Go Magic's second album, Pitchfork wrote: "Luke Temple takes his Here We Go Magic project for a spin on the Autobahn and opens the throttle." The BBC wrote "Redraw those best music of 2010 lists because Pigeons, the second album from HWGM, will be alighting somewhere near the top of them.” The San Diego City Beat called the album; "A varied record full of fast-paced riffs, layered vocals, electronic noises, ambient sounds and the steady lull of Temple’s croon."

== Track listing ==
No.	Title	Length
1.	"Hibernation"	3:38
2.	"Collector"	5:07
3.	"Casual"	5:13
4.	"Surprise"	5:50
5.	"Bottom Feeder"	3:51
6.	"Moon"	4:20
7.	"Old World United"	3:55
8.	"F.F.A.P."	4:21
9.	"Land of Feeling"	4:58
10.	"Vegetable or Native"	3:41
11.	"Herbie I Love You, Now I Know"	2:49
