= Mildred (band) =

American rock band

Mildred (stylized in all lowercase) is an American rock band formed in Oakland, California in 2022, consisting of Henry Easton Koehler (vocals, guitar), Jack Schrott (vocals, guitar), Matt Palmquist (vocals, bass, woodwinds), and Will Fortna (drums, production). Their debut album, Fenceline, released on April 24, 2026, through Memorials of Distinction and Dog Day Press.

== Band formation ==
Henry Easton Koehler and Jack Schrott were childhood friends in Portland, Oregon, and the two lived with Matt Palmquist as adults in Oakland, California. Koehler and Will Fortna are cousins.

== Discography ==
- Mild (2025)
- Red (2025)
- Fenceline (2026)
