= Friday Pilots Club =

American alternative rock band

- Friday Pilots Club performing at Union Transfer in Philadelphia on April 20, 2026

Background information
- Origin: Chicago, Illinois, US
- Genres: Alternative rock; Indie rock
- Years active: 2017–present
- Label: Big Machine
- Members: Caleb Hiltunen; Drew Polovick; Sean Burke; James Kourafas; Eric Doar
- Past members: Mike Fornari; Spencer Rydholm; Ethan Mole
- Website: www.fridaypilotsclub.com

Friday Pilots Club is an American alternative rock band formed in Chicago, in 2017 by Caleb Hiltunen and Drew Polovick. As of 2026, the band has released four EPs and one album.

== History ==
=== Early years (2017–2018) ===
The precursor to Friday Pilots Club was formed by vocalist Caleb Hiltunen and bassist Drew Polovick, who had formed a duo after meeting at a party in Chicago. The current lineup came to be when the duo joined forces with guitarists Sean Burke and James Kourafas and drummer Eric Doar, originally as touring artists, although the three would slowly become full-time members of the band. All five members had previously performed in various bands at Columbia College, having crossed paths several times.

After forming the touring lineup of five, the band release their singles "End of It", "Bad As Hell", "Would You Mind", "Gold and Bones", and "PRBLM".

=== Big Machine Records and EPs (2019–2023) ===
In 2019, Friday Pilots Club signed to Big Machine Records and released the John Fields-produced single "Glory". On October 11, 2019, they released their first EP entitled While You Wait. Following on from 2020's "Breaking My Bones" and "Look Better In Gold" and 2021's "I Don't Care", the band released their self-titled second EP Friday Pilots Club on May 7, 2021. In the fall of 2021, FPC left their then label Big Machine Records shortly before their fall 2021 tour, citing creative differences and a lack of creative control.

With the single "For the Wicked" in September 2021, the group announced that they are working on their third EP. The band turned a new leaf in 2022, starting with the release of their new single "Hot Mess". On October 27, 2022, the band released their third EP, I LOVE YOU, ROBOT SUPERSTAR!.

=== Nowhere (2024–2026) ===
Friday Pilots Club released their debut album, Nowhere, on May 9, 2024. In an interview regarding the album's release, Polovick stated:

We used to be a two-piece, and then we were a two-piece with these three guys. They started writing with us and playing on the songs, but it still didn't quite feel like a band. We ﬁnally feel like this album is an amalgamation of what all of us like and what all of us believe in.

Following the release, the band kicked off the Nowhere Tour to support the album, performing in the United Kingdom, as well as 28 cities across the United States and Canada. The band also co-headlined a tour with Circa Waves from April to May 2025.

Friday Pilots Club served as a supporting act for The Maine during their North American tour in April 2026. On April 23, 2026, Friday Pilots Club released their first single after their album debut, "Big Money".

=== EP1 (2026–present) ===
Friday Pilots Club released their fourth EP on November 5, 2026, EP1, and in an interview following its release stated that "...calling this next project EP1 is our way of leaving the door open in this current era of the band’s sound."

== Discography ==
=== Albums ===
Year	Title	Details
2024	Nowhere	Release Date: May 9, 2024; Format: Digital; Label: Independent

=== EPs ===
Year	Title	Details
2019	While You Wait	Release Date: October 9, 2019; Format: Digital; Label: Big Machine Records
2021	Friday Pilots Club	Release Date: May 6, 2021; Format: Digital; Label: Big Machine Records
2022	I LOVE YOU, ROBOT SUPERSTAR!	Release Date: October 27, 2022; Format: Digital; Label: Independent
2026	EP1	Release Date: November 5, 2026; Format: Digital; Label: Independent

=== Singles ===
List of singles
Title	Year	Album/EP
"End of It"	2017	Non-album single
"Bad As Hell"	2018	Non-album single
"Would You Mind"	2018	Non-album single
"Gold and Bones"	2018	Non-album single
"PRBLM"	2018	Non-album single
"Glory"	2019	Non-album single
"Heartbreak Beat"	2019	While You Wait
"Lips Like Sugar"	2019	While You Wait
"Real Wild Child (Wild One)"	2019	While You Wait
"Look Better in Gold"	2021	Friday Pilots Club
"For the Wicked"	2021	Non-album single
"Hot Mess"	2022	I LOVE YOU, ROBOT SUPERSTAR!
"Better With"	2022	I LOVE YOU, ROBOT SUPERSTAR!
"Never Say No"	2022	I LOVE YOU, ROBOT SUPERSTAR!
"Life Support"	2023	Non-album single
"Ms. Supernova"	2023	Non-album single
"Sleeping on the Ceiling"	2023	Non-album single
"Pushing Daisies (Oh My My)"	2023	Non-album single
"Vampire Disco"	2024	Nowhere
"Big Money"	2026	Non-album single
