= Here We Go Magic =

American indie rock band

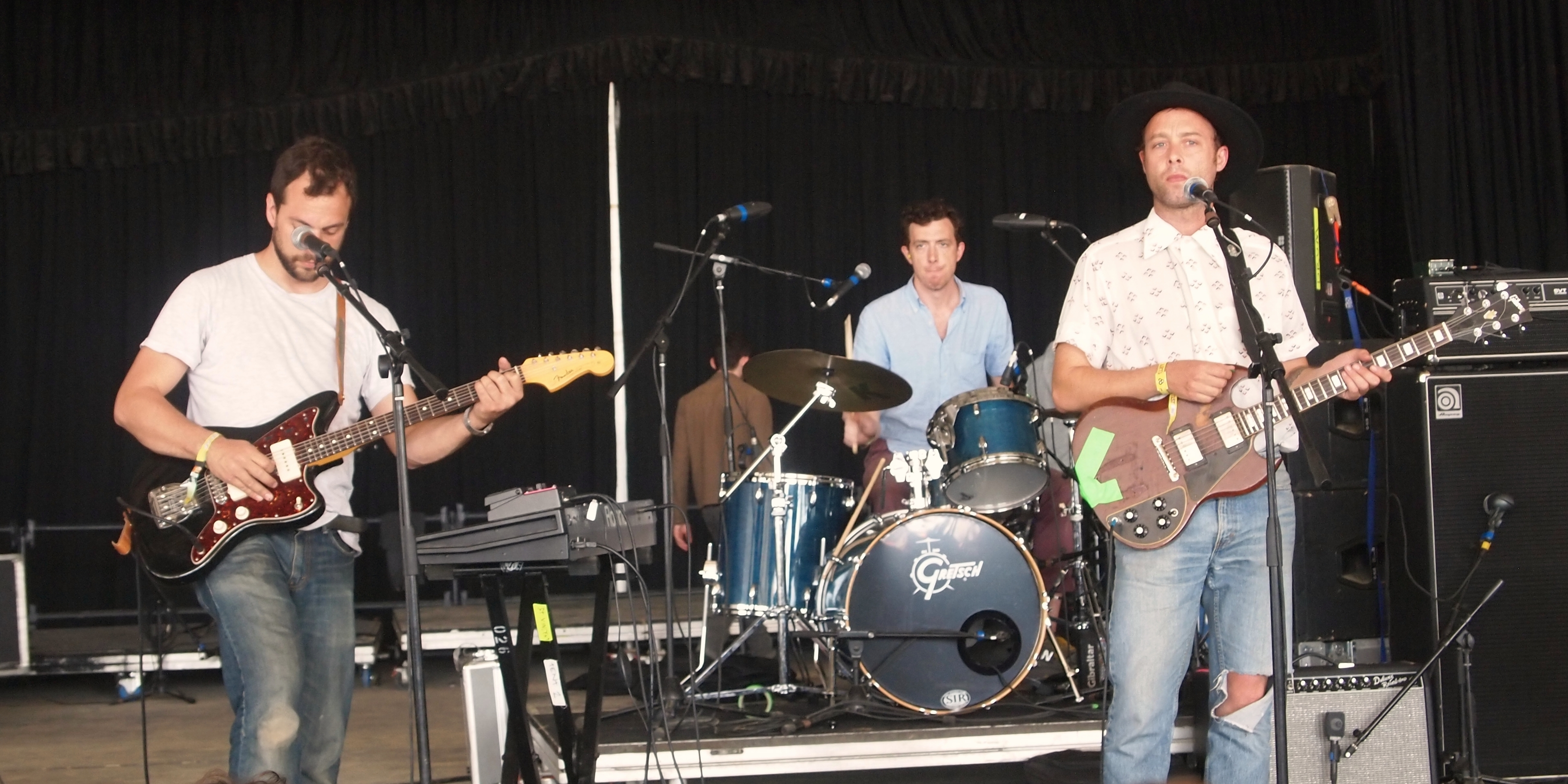
- Performing live at the 2012 Bonnaroo Music Festival

Background information
- Origin: Brooklyn, New York, United States
- Genres: Indie rock
- Years active: 2008–2016
- Labels: Secretly Canadian, Western Vinyl
- Members: Luke Temple; Michael Bloch; Peter Hale
- Past members: Kristina Lieberson; Jen Turner
- Website: http://herewegomagicband.tumblr.com/

Here We Go Magic was an American indie rock band based in Brooklyn, New York. It was formed by core members Luke Temple, Michael Bloch and Peter Hale, in late 2008. The band signed to Western Vinyl in 2008, followed by the five-piece group's signing to Secretly Canadian in 2009.

== History ==
=== Here We Go Magic (2009) ===
After previously releasing two folk albums under his own name in the mid-2000s, Luke Temple released the self-titled album Here We Go Magic in February 2009 on Western Vinyl, described by Pitchfork as "hazy electronic textures, endlessly-spiraling lyrical loops, occasional forays into extended sections of ambience and noise". Temple recorded the album at home on a 4-track recorder, describing the recording: "I just had one tom, one microphone, a synth and an acoustic guitar. I didn't have a full drum kit or normal bass, it was just all synth stuff that I did myself." The album does feature a live band on one of its nine tracks, the song "Everything's Big", which features Here We Go Magic guitarist Michael Bloch along with musicians Tyler Wood (keyboards), Parker Kindred (drums) and Adam Chilenski (bass).

=== Pigeons (2010) ===
After several tours incorporating members Kristina Lieberson (keyboards) and Jen Turner (bass), the band signed as a five-piece to Secretly Canadian in September 2009. They had toured in 2009 with Grizzly Bear and the Walkmen. The second album Pigeons was released on 8 June 2010. The band wrote and recorded the album over a period of several months living together in a secluded house in upstate New York. Pigeons was produced by bassist Jen Turner and engineered by Victor Magro. The first single off Pigeons, "Collector", was rated "Best New Music" by Pitchfork on March 18, 2010. The band performed at the SXSW festival in 2009 and again in March 2010, and completed tours of North America with White Rabbits and of Europe with the New Pornographers. In summer 2010 the band played at multiple major festivals including Primavera Sound, Bonnaroo, Pitchfork, the Great Escape, Latitude, Bestival, and Glastonbury, where Thom Yorke said they were his favorite act of the festival. They ended the year 2010 touring with the Canadian band Broken Social Scene.

=== The January EP (2011) ===
In the months leading up to The January EP, Here We Go Magic played a few shows around North America, including sets at Coachella and Wilco's Solid Sound Festival. The January EP was produced by the band's bassist, Jen Turner. Here We Go Magic recorded the tracks live on an analog tape in a band built living room during the same time they were working on Pigeons. The EP was widely well received, gaining high marks from many publications and critics. Slant Magazine called the record a "synthy, dreamy album captured a rich sound with very little bluster, effectively lulling and beguiling listeners with quiet, acoustic-driven psychedelia".

=== A Different Ship (2012) ===
After seeing Here We Go Magic's Glastonbury performance, Radiohead producer Nigel Godrich asked to produce the band's fourth album. The group accepted, and A Different Ship became the product. The album garnered great critical acclaim. The New York Times said A Different Ship "discreetly shows off the band's meticulous virtuosity; its patterns are played, not programmed". BBC Music held the album to an equally high regard. In one review they noted, "Played live these songs will metastasise into expansive jams, and will sound great when they do, but here and now they're sharp, disciplined, and seriously compelling". In November 2012, Here We Go Magic headed back out on tour, starting with a show at the Brooklyn Bowl. After their start on the East Coast, they made their way to the Midwest for the Midpoint Music Festival. Tour dates through October 12 included singer-songwriter Andrew Bird. Later in the year they performed in Britain, supporting Elbow.

While on the road for their tour in May 2012, the band picked up the filmmaker and author John Waters, who was hitchhiking for his book Carsick. Tweets from the band resulted in massive media coverage, and Waters spoke fondly of the group in the book.

=== Be Small (2015) ===
Following 2012's A Different Ship, the members of Here We Go Magic began to drift apart as new professional and personal avenues opened up for them. While the band was on a hiatus, remaining members Luke Temple and Michael Bloch came back together to begin recording Be Small. The 11-track album combines a collection of the band's older live sessions with Temple's newer musical ideas from his home studio. The Skinny stated that, while "Here We Go Magic's line-up may have undergone a significant reshuffle since the release of 2012's acclaimed A Different Ship, frontman Luke Temple has managed to retain a similar auricular template with Be Small." In October 2015, the band headed out on tour, beginning on the east coast of the US, with stops across the United States and Canada.

== Musical style ==
The first album has been described as "stream-of-conscious lyrics and swirls of psychedelic, lo-fi noise", and "insistently repetitive grooves and densely layered loops". NPR Music stated that its "colorful swirl of synthesizers and guitars ranges from electronic folk to psychedelia to lo-fi acoustic". Erik Adams, writing for The A.V. Club, saw it as an album of two distinct sides, "one full of hummable, groove-inflected bedroom folk, and the other populated by cascading waves of ambient white noise". Tim DiGravina, reviewing the album for Allmusic described it as "everything but the kitchen sink, stream of conscious composition...taking on a couple different and somewhat incongruous genres, from Afro-beat pop to freak folk to outright noise collages".

The expanded line-up has been described as "psychedelic electro-folk" and walking "the line between ambient hypnotica and melodic indie rock". The Independent, reviewing "Collector" also identified a krautrock influence, stating that the band "channel propulsive krautrock and 1980s indie rock to great effect". Allmusic writer Jason Thurston described the band's sound as an "ethereal collage of indie folk, Baroque pop, plains country (and whatever else strikes their fancy)".

== Discography ==
=== Studio albums ===
Title	Album details	Peak chart positions
Title	Album details	US Heat.
Here We Go Magic	Released: 2009; Label: Western Vinyl	—
Pigeons	Released: June 8, 2010; Label: Secretly Canadian	—
A Different Ship	Released: May 8, 2012; Label: Secretly Canadian	35
Be Small	Released: 2015; Label: Secretly Canadian	—
"—" denotes a recording that did not chart or was not released in that territory.

=== Extended plays and singles ===
- "The Collector" (2010), Secretly Canadian
- "Casual" (2010), Secretly Canadian
- The January EP (2011), Secretly Canadian
- How Do I Know b/w My Plate's On Fire (7" vinyl) (2012), Secretly Canadian
- "Hard To Be Close" (2012), Secretly Canadian
- "How Do I Know" (2012), Secretly Canadian
- "You Get More Done When You're Happy" (Flexi-Disc Single) (2013), Joyful Noise Recordings
- "Live EP" (2013), Secretly Canadian
- "Falling" (2015), Secretly Canadian

=== Music Videos ===
- Falling
- Hard To Be Close
- How Do I Know
- Make Up Your Mind
- Casual
- Collector
- Fangela
- Tunnelvision
