= Super Doppler =

American musical group

Super Doppler (formerly known as Major And The Monbacks) is an American psychedelic rock band from Norfolk, Virginia consisting of six members: Neal Friedman on keys, guitar, and vocals; Michael Adkins on keys, guitar, and vocals; Cole Friedman on bass guitar; Tyler West on percussion; Harry Slater on guitar, keyboards, and vocals, and Bryan Adkins on drums. They began to attract a following while touring the Eastern United States extensively. They released their self-titled debut album (Major & the Monbacks) in May 2015. Prior to releasing their second album Moonlight Anthems (produced by Matthew E. White) in 2017, the band announced they had changed their name to Super Doppler. The band self-released Moonlight Anthems on June 16, 2017.

== History ==
The members of the band met in high school, and describe their beginnings as "a loose collective of high school friends with a common interest in late nights and loud music." Upon graduating, they embarked on a nine-month tour of the Eastern United States that spanned 30,000 miles and 150+ shows.

In early 2015, Major And The Monbacks mounted a crowdfunding campaign to raise funds to record their first album in Nashville. They surpassed their original goal. The final album was released in May 2015 and received high praise from outlets local to their home state of Virginia as well as popular national music and art critique websites such as No Depression and PopMatters.

Their second album Moonlight Anthens was produced by Matthew E. White of Spacebomb Records who, alongside having a successful career as a musician, has worked with artists including Foxygen and Natalie Prass.

American Songwriter debuted the first single from Moonlight Anthems, on March 10, 2017. The song title is "We Are Doing Fine," and the outlet praised it as "a Beatles-influenced tune with lush walls of vocal harmonies, a prominent horn section, and an anthemic singalong chorus."

== Discography ==
- Major And The Monbacks (2015)
- Moonlight Anthems (2017)
