= The Silent Comedy =

- Origin: San Diego, California United States
- Genres: Americana, folk, Blues
- Years active: 2006–present
- Labels: Singleton RMI
- Members: Joshua Zimmerman; Jeremiah Zimmerman; Chad Lee; Justin Buchanan
- Past members: Timothy Graves; Ian Kesterson; Joseph Nelson
- Website: www.thesilentcomedy.com

The Silent Comedy is an American rock band, known for their folk, rock and roll, and Americana-inspired music.

== History ==
The band was founded in San Diego, California by brothers Joshua and Jeremiah Zimmerman,

In September 2010, their album Common Faults won the San Diego Music Awards's 'Best Pop Album' award.

Their songs "Bartholomew" and "All Saints Day" were used in 2011 TV advertisements for the video game Dark Souls. "Bartholomew" was the fifth song from their full-length record, Common Faults, and was the first songwriting contribution from The Silent Comedy guitarist and harmonica player Timothy Graves.

"Bartholomew" was also used in trailers and television advertisements for the "History Channel" 3-part epic miniseries "Hatfields & McCoys" premiering on May 28, 2012.

Another of the band's songs, "Blood on the Rails," was used in trailers and television spots for another "History" miniseries, "The Men Who Built America", premiering on October 16, 2012.

"All Saints Day" was used for yet another "History Channel" miniseries, entitled "The Bible".

In 2013, their song "Bartholomew" was used in a teaser trailer for the third season of the television series Strike Back

"Bartholomew" was also used in episode 8 of the television series The Originals in November 2013.

"Bartholomew" was the opening theme of 2016 Amazon's first season of Goliath.

The Friends Divide EP was produced by Chris "Frenchie" Smith.

In February 2023, a documentary feature film about the band called "I Am Alright" was the opening night film at the Oceanside International Film Festival.

== Live performance ==
Hugo Mintz from Bring The Noise music blog wrote that The Silent Comedy "struck us as America’s slightly heavier and more interesting answer to UK’s Mumford and Sons, a diverse and engaging sound"

== Discography ==
=== Albums ===
- Sunset Stables, 2007, Singleton RMI
- Common Faults, 2010, Singleton RMI
- Enemies Multiply, 2018, The Silent Comedy

=== EPs ===
- The Silent Comedy, 2008, Singleton RMI
- Cruelty & Clemency, 2011, Singleton RMI
- Friends Divide, 2013, Singleton RMI
