= 2004 Bonnaroo Music Festival =

The festival ran June 11, 2004 – June 13, 2004, and more than 90,000 people attended. It was marked by torrential rains, creating an incredibly large amount of mud. Many vehicles had to be towed out of the parking area.

== Lineup ==
=== June 11th ===
(artists listed from earliest to latest set times)

- What Stage:
  - Wilco
  - Bob Dylan
  - Dave Matthews & Friends
- Which Stage:
  - Los Lonely Boys
  - Yonder Mountain String Band
  - Ani Difranco
  - The String Cheese Incident
- This Tent:
  - Calexico
  - Neko Case
  - North Mississippi Allstars Hill Country Revue
  - Gillian Welch
  - Praxis
- That Tent:
  - mrnorth
  - The Black Keys
  - Patti Smith & Her Band
  - Yo La Tengo
  - Vida Blue featuring The Spam Allstars
- The Other Tent:
  - Xavier Rudd
  - JoJo & His Mojo Mardi Gras Band
  - Mofro
  - Chris Robinson and New Earth Mud
  - Umphrey's McGee

=== June 12th ===
(artists listed from earliest to latest set times)

- What Stage:
  - Los Lobos
  - Gov't Mule
  - Steve Winwood
  - The Dead
- Which Stage:
  - Hackensaw Boys
  - Gomez
  - My Morning Jacket
  - Galactic
  - Primus
- This Tent:
  - Acoustic Syndicate
  - The Del McCoury Band
  - Sam Bush Band
  - Doc Watson
  - Ween
- That Tent:
  - Kings of Leon
  - Grandaddy
  - Beth Orton
  - Damien Rice
  - Robert Randolph and the Family Band
- The Other Tent:
  - Blue Merle
  - Mindy Smith
  - Robert Earl Keen
  - Jazz Mandolin Project

=== June 13th ===
(artists listed from earliest to latest set times)

- What Stage:
  - Burning Spear
  - moe.
  - David Byrne
  - Trey Anastasio
- Which Stage:
  - Tokyo Ska Paradise Orchestra
  - Taj Mahal
  - Femi Kuti
  - Medeski Martin & Wood
- This Tent:
  - Leftover Salmon
  - Cracker/Camper Van Beethoven
  - Barbara Cue
- That Tent:
  - Marc Ribot y Los Cubanos Postizos
  - The Bad Plus
  - Soulive
  - Material
- The Other Tent:
  - Marc Broussard
  - Donavan Frankenreiter
  - Guster

== Notes ==
Willie Nelson was originally scheduled to perform but, shortly before the festival, had to cancel his summer 2004 tour due to carpal tunnel syndrome. Steve Winwood was asked to fill in.

Maroon 5 was also on the bill, but did not appear at their performance time, citing a sore throat by lead vocalist Adam Levine.

== Superjam ==
(Core band members only, guests not included)

George Porter (bass), Stanton Moore (drums), and Eric Krasno and Neil Evans of Soulive (guitar and keyboard).
