= Great Stage Park =

Outdoor concert venue in Manchester, Tennessee, US

Coordinates: 35°28′40″N 86°03′02″W

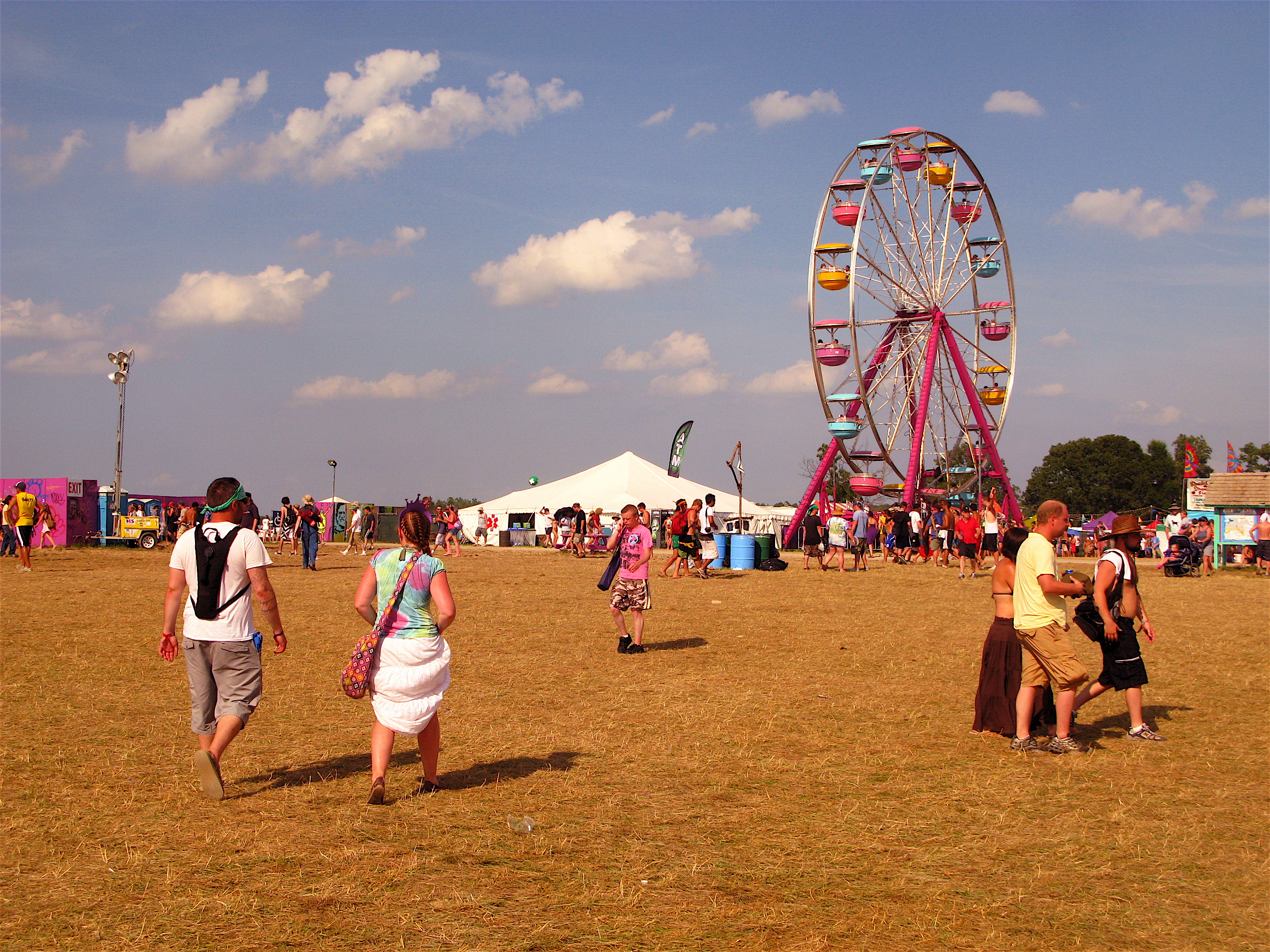
Great Stage Park during the 2010 Bonnaroo Music Festival

Great Stage Park is a 650-acre (2.63 km^{2}) outdoor event space located 65 miles (105 km) southeast of Nashville in Manchester, Tennessee. Since 2002 it has been home to the Bonnaroo Music and Arts Festival, the largest outdoor festival in North America. It was also the site of the Exit 111 Festival in October 2019. When not hosting festivals, the site or “The Farm” as most people know it as, remains virtually unused. The "What Stage", fountain, permanent bathrooms, barn, and a few other small buildings are the only permanent buildings on site. Every other structure is assembled for the festivals only.
