= Bonnaroo =

Music festival in Tennessee, U.S.

- Genre: Pop, alternative rock, indie rock, hip hop, R&B, electronic, funk, stoner rock, jazz, jam bands, Americana, country, folk, bluegrass, gospel, reggae, world
- Dates: Generally second Thursday in June, duration of four days
- Locations: Great Stage Park, Manchester, Tennessee, U.S.
- Years active: 2002–2019; 2022–2026
- Attendance: ~45,000 (2026)
- Organizer: Live Nation
- Website: Official website

Bonnaroo (or Bonnaroo Music and Arts Festival) is an American annual four-day music festival developed and founded by Superfly Presents and AC Entertainment.

Bonnaroo has taken place at what is now Great Stage Park, a 700-acre (280 ha) farm in Manchester, Tennessee, since it was founded in 2002. The festival typically starts on the second Thursday in June and lasts four days. Musical acts begin on Wednesday evening and end on Sunday night. Its multiple stages feature stylistically diverse music, including indie rock, classic rock, world music, hip hop, jazz, Americana, bluegrass, country music, folk, gospel, reggae, pop, electronic, and other alternative music.

The festival was ranked in 2003 by Rolling Stone magazine as one of the "50 Moments That Changed Rock & Roll", "Festival of the Decade" by Consequence of Sound, and among the 10 Best Festivals by GQ.

== History ==
Ashley Capps, co-founder of AC Entertainment, developed Bonnaroo following the cancellation of the Hot Summer Nights rock music festival in Knoxville, Tennessee in 1999. Hot Summer Nights, which was a mainstay in Knoxville's World's Fair Park, suspended operations permanently following construction by city officials. Capps said: "The closing of the World's Fair Park for concerts precipitated getting creative and trying to find, 'OK, if we can't do this anymore, how can we still participate in the summer outdoor concert business,' and it was from that that Bonnaroo was ultimately launched." The festival was launched in 2002 by Capps, Superfly, manager Coran Capshaw and music agent Chip Hooper.

In 1999, the future site of Bonnaroo hosted the Itchycoo Park Festival (named after the song Itchycoo Park by Small Faces), considered the spiritual predecessor to Bonnaroo. Inspired by the 1974 Dr. John album Desitively Bonnaroo, the founders chose the name "Bonnaroo"—Creole slang for a really good time—for both its meaning and to honor New Orleans music.

In 2019, after a record-breaking festival sellout, it was announced that Live Nation was buying out Superfly's share of Bonnaroo.

The 2020 event was initially pushed back three months until September 2020, before ultimately being cancelled, because of health concerns surrounding the COVID-19 pandemic in the United States. The 2021 event was canceled due to torrential rainfall from Hurricane Ida saturating the stage area, campgrounds, and tollbooth area, and making ground conditions unsuitable for vehicle traffic. In 2025, the day after its Thursday night opening, the festival was cancelled due to severe weather.

Hulu has exclusively streamed the festival from 2022 to 2024, alongside Austin City Limits Music Festival and Lollapalooza. Bonnaroo 2026 was streamed on Hulu and Disney+.

Bonnaroo co-founder Jonathan Mayers, who launched the festival with Superfly co-founders Kerry Black, Rick Farman, and Richard Goodstone, died on June 10, 2025, at the age of 51.

On August 21, 2026, Bonnaroo organizers announced that the festival "will be taking a much-needed year off in 2027".

== Economy ==
In 2009, the Bonnaroo Works Fund was created as a 501(c)(3) nonprofit organization for the festival. The organization awards grants to local non-profits and schools.

By 2013, the direct and indirect economic impact of the festival since its inception was estimated at $51 million, including $2.9 million in tax revenue for the year 2012.

In 2023, Bonnaroo contributed $339.8 million to the regional economy (including over $5.1 million in tax revenue), and created or supported 4,163 full-time job equivalents.

== Environmentalism ==
Bonnaroo actively supports recycling and sustainability. In 2011, A Greener Festival recognized Bonnaroo's efforts for the previous three years with an award. In 2004 Bonnaroo said it prevented having to collect 120 tons of trash by encouraging fans to recycle. Food and drink are sold in organic and recyclable materials to create less waste. AGF auditors review festivals, as well as requiring their self-evaluation. As of late, Bonnaroo has initiated many "green" activities during the festival, such as Planet Roo.

== Reception ==
When the festival began in 2002, USA Today referred to Bonnaroo as "the culmination of a musical movement." CNN described it as "music and subculture melted together into a pot of creative bubbling energy."

In 2008, it was named "Best Festival" by Rolling Stone magazine, calling it "the ultimate over-the-top summer festival". The New York Times said "Bonnaroo has revolutionized the modern rock festival" in 2012, Spin called it the "best festival of the summer", and The Recording Academy has named it "the pinnacle of summer music festivals". Billboard named Bonnaroo the 8th best music festival in 2022.

Bonnaroo has been referred to as "the Glastonbury Festival of the United States" based on its similarities to the massive British festival, which, like Bonnaroo, includes camping, a sense of community, and a large farmground location.

== Venues ==
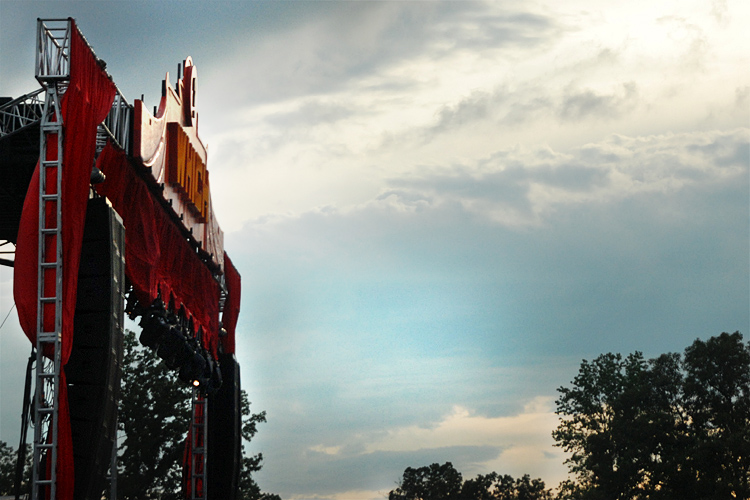
Which Stage at the Bonnaroo Music Festival in Manchester, Tennessee.

Bonnaroo has various stages in the venue area (called "Centeroo") and in the campground area (called "Outeroo"). Centeroo stages include the What Stage, Which Stage, That Tent, This Tent, and The Other Stage (previously "The Other Tent", but changed to a full stage to accommodate the growth of EDM at the festival). Outeroo stages in the campgrounds vary year-to-year, but has included a Where in the Woods Stage since 2018, which exclusively offers electronic music shows during late night hours. The biggest stage that headliners appear on, the What Stage, can accommodate up to 80,000 fans.

== Notable performances ==
In 2009, the Beastie Boys played their final show ever at the festival. Member Adam "MCA" Yauch was diagnosed with a cancerous tumor in his parotid gland the next month, during a brief tour break, and all future tour dates were subsequently canceled. He died a few years later.

R&B singer D'Angelo marked his return to American stages for the first time in over 12 years on June 9, 2012, with a surprise performance at the festival's annual Superjam. He was backed by members of the R&B collective the Soulquarians, most notably Questlove, James Poyser and Pino Palladino, with guest guitarist Jesse Johnson. The set was composed almost entirely of covers.

== Activities ==
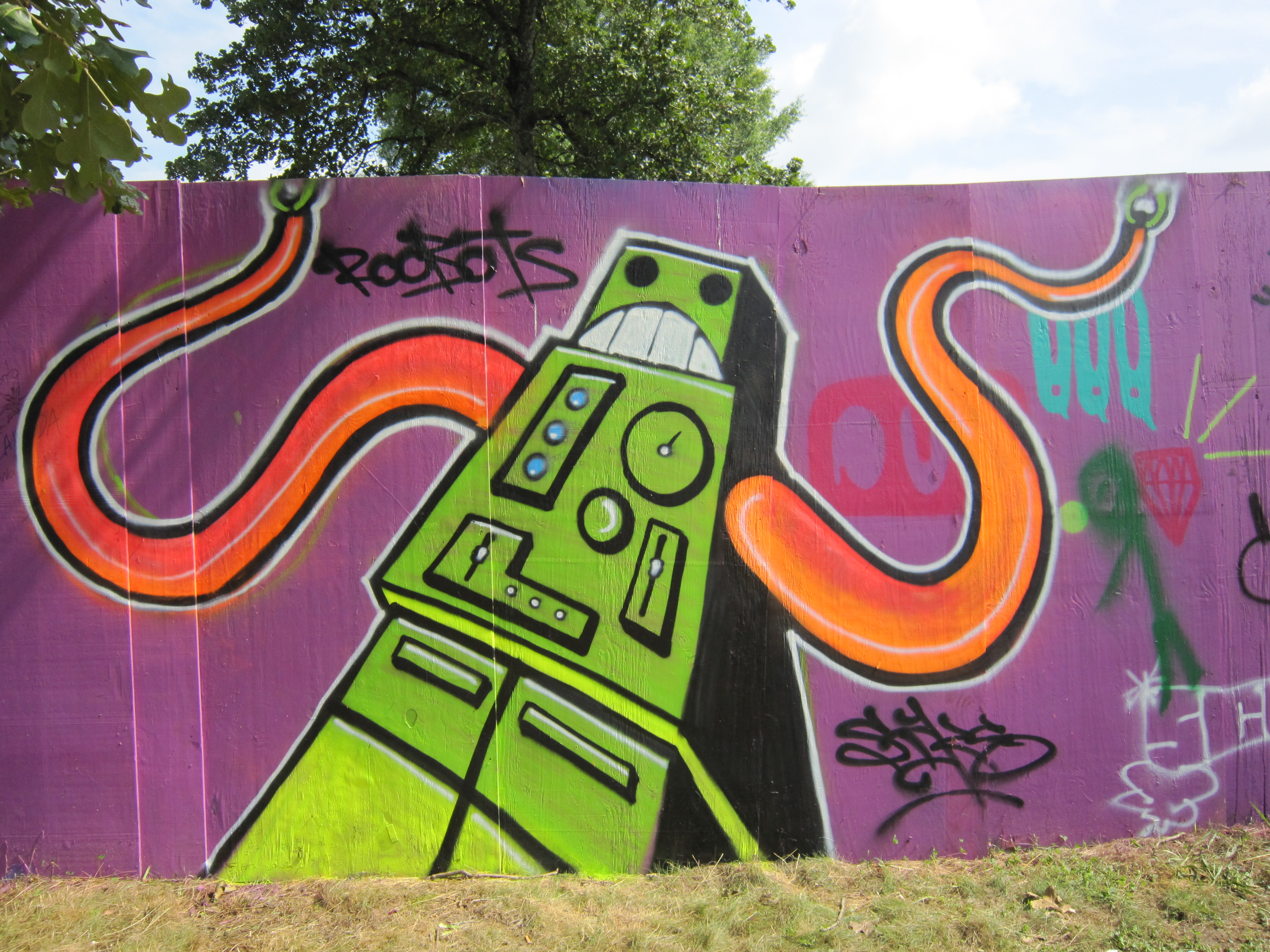
Graffiti by Nashville artist Ryan McCauley on the Graffiti Wall, which separates Centeroo from the campsites.

In addition to music, Bonnaroo offered comedy and cinema in a dedicated tent. The tent was removed in 2008.

Bonnaroo offers various artistic, environmental, and community activities throughout the weekend in both Centeroo and Outeroo. These activities include parades, dance shows, yoga, sustainability lessons, a 5k run, a marriage barn, a water slide, vendor markets, and more.

== Annual attendance ==
- 2002: 70,000
- 2003: 80,000
- 2004: 90,000
- 2005: 76,000
- 2006: 80,000
- 2007: 80,000
- 2008: 70,000
- 2009: 75,000–80,000
- 2010: 75,000
- 2011: 80,000
- 2012: 100,000
- 2013: 90,000
- 2014: 90,000+ (estimated)
- 2015: 74,000
- 2016: 45,500
- 2017: 65,000
- 2018: 76,000
- 2019: 80,000
- 2020: Canceled (Note: Canceled due to COVID-19 pandemic)
- 2021: Canceled (Note: Rescheduled for September 2 to 5, 2021 but canceled due to flooding from Hurricane Ida)
- 2022: 40,000
- 2023: 85,000
- 2024: 70,000
- 2025: Canceled (Note: Scheduled for June 12 to 15, 2025 but canceled on June 13 due to flooding)
- 2026: ~45,000
- 2027: Canceled

== See also ==
- List of historic rock festivals
- List of jam band music festivals
