= Luke Temple =

American singer-songwriter

- Also known as: Art Feynman
- Born: 31 October 1982 (age 43); Boston, Massachusetts, United States
- Genres: indie rock, indie folk, psychedelic pop
- Years active: 2005–present
- Labels: Secretly Canadian, Western Vinyl, Native Cat
- Formerly of: Here We Go Magic
- Website: luketemple.tv

Luke Temple, also known under the alias Art Feynman, is an American singer-songwriter. He records under his own name and with New York–based band Here We Go Magic.

Temple was born in Salem, Massachusetts. After spending time in Northern California, he studied painting at Boston's Museum of Fine Arts. After struggling to make a living as a visual artist, including painting murals in upscale New York City apartments, Temple moved into songwriting and recording. After recording a four song EP himself on a four-track recorder, Temple was signed to Mill Pond Records of Seattle. He would go on to record two full-length albums with Mill Pond, Hold a Match for a Gasoline World (2005) and Snow Beast (2007), before signing with label Secretly Canadian in 2010 for Good Mood Fool. On November 11, 2016, Temple released A Hand Through the Cellar Door.

Temple's vocal styles are noted for their use of falsetto, and have been compared to Paul Simon, Jeff Buckley, and Nick Drake.

His song "Make Right With You" was featured in an episode of Grey's Anatomy, season 3's "Where the Boys Are".

Temple also began releasing music under the alias Art Feynman in 2017, beginning with Blast Off Through the Wicker released on the Western Vinyl label.

Temple recorded the 2026 album Fenceline by the band Mildred in his recording studio in Echo Park.

== Discography ==
=== Luke Temple ===
Studio albums

- 2005 – Hold a Match for a Gasoline World (Mill Pond)
- 2007 – Snowbeast (Mill Pond)
- 2011 – Don't Act Like You Don't Care (Western Vinyl)
- 2013 – Good Mood Fool (Secretly Canadian)
- 2016 – A Hand Through the Cellar Door (Secretly Canadian)
- 2019 – Both-And (Native Cat Recordings)
- 2026 – Hungry Animal (Western Vinyl)

Extended plays

- 2004 – Luke Temple (Mill Pond)

=== Luke Temple and The Cascading Moms ===
Studio albums

- 2024 – Certain Limitations (Western Vinyl)

=== Art Feynman ===
Studio albums

- 2017 – Blast Off Through the Wicker (Western Vinyl)
- 2020 – Half Price at 3:30 (Western Vinyl)
- 2023 – Be Good The Crazy Boys (Western Vinyl)

Extended plays

- 2017 – Near Negative (Western Vinyl)
