= Rubblebucket =

American art-pop and indie-rock band

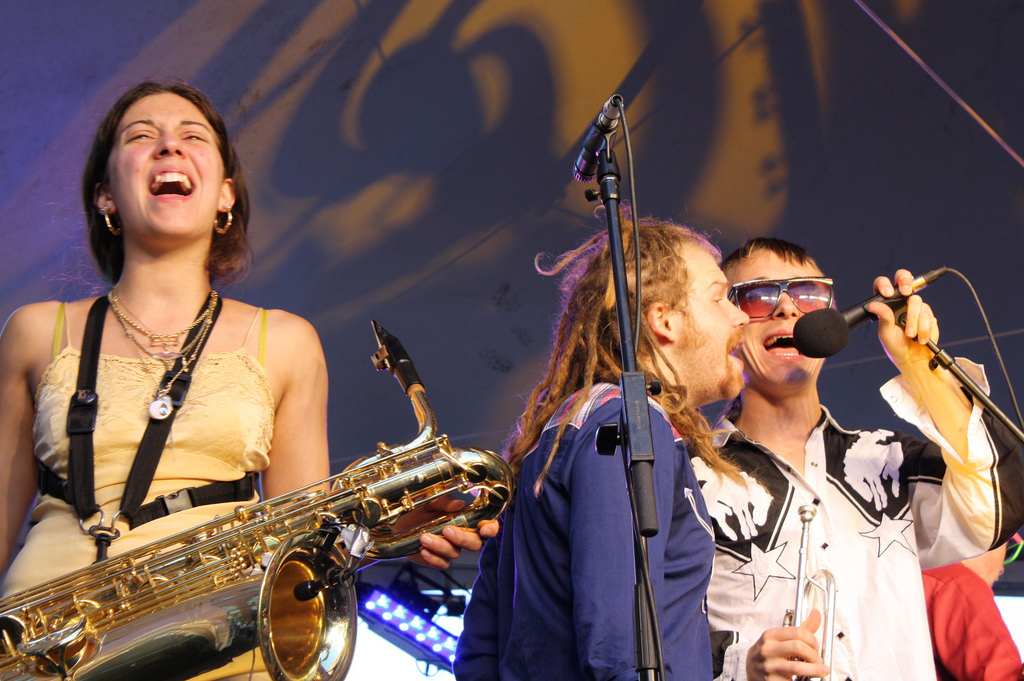
- Rubblebucket performing in Vermont in 2010

Background information
- Origin: Somerville, Massachusetts, United States
- Genres: Indie pop, neo-psychedelia, art-pop, alternative dance
- Years active: 2007–present
- Labels: Grand Jury Music, Communion
- Members: Annakalmia Traver; Alex Toth
- Past members: Adam Dotson; Ian Hersey; David Cole; Craig Myers
- Website: Official website

Rubblebucket is an American art-pop and indie-rock band from Brooklyn, New York. The primary members are a musical couple (now separated) Annakalmia Traver and Alex Toth.

== Formation ==
Alex Toth (trumpet, band leader) and Kalmia Traver (vocals, saxophone) first met at the University of Vermont where they were both enrolled as music majors. Upon graduating in 2006, they began touring the United States as members of different projects. The band began performing primarily in the Northeast, in major cities and college towns, earning a reputation for their raucous energy.

Toth had been developing a dance band that merges psychedelic indie rock, upbeat dance, and left field arrangements. In June 2007, the pair met percussionist Craig Myers; the improvised music they made at a party was arranged and elaborated on to become the first contribution to the band's repertoire.

== Career ==
In March 2008, Rubblebucket self-released their debut album, Rose's Dream, under the name Rubblebucket Orchestra and began to tour full-time. They were chosen by Spin magazine as a "Must-hear artist from the 2009 CMJs". On October 13, they released their self-titled second studio album, and officially changed their name to Rubblebucket. In December, they won a Boston Music Award for Live Act of the Year.

In 2010, Rubblebucket appeared at festivals such as High Sierra, All Good Music Festival, and the Liberate Music and Dance Festival. On October 19, 2010, they released their Triangular Daisies EP; it included a cover of the Beatles' "Michelle", which Paste magazine named on their list of 50 Greatest Beatles Covers of All Time.

In Spring 2011, Rubblebucket released their third full-length album, Omega La La. It was recorded at DFA studios, produced by Eric Broucek, and mastered by Joe Lambert. On April 4, 2011, the band released it as a free download before its physical release on June 21 through MRI Distribution. Promotional performances for the album included an appearance on Jimmy Kimmel Live! in 2012. The band also performed at Bonnaroo Music and Arts Festival for the 1st time where they “revved up like an indie-rock Miami Sound Machine” (Rolling Stone), including multiple sets throughout the weekend

In 2013, Rubblebucket collaborated with Questlove, Tune-Yards singer Merrill Garbus, Angelique Kidjo and poet Akua Naru to create a new compilation album for Fela Kuti's Lady. In 2014, Rubblebucket served as Arcade Fire's "The Reflektors" at the Glastonbury Festival. Customary to most Arcade Fire shows of the time, "The Reflektors" wore massive papier-mâché heads as a fake-out to fans.

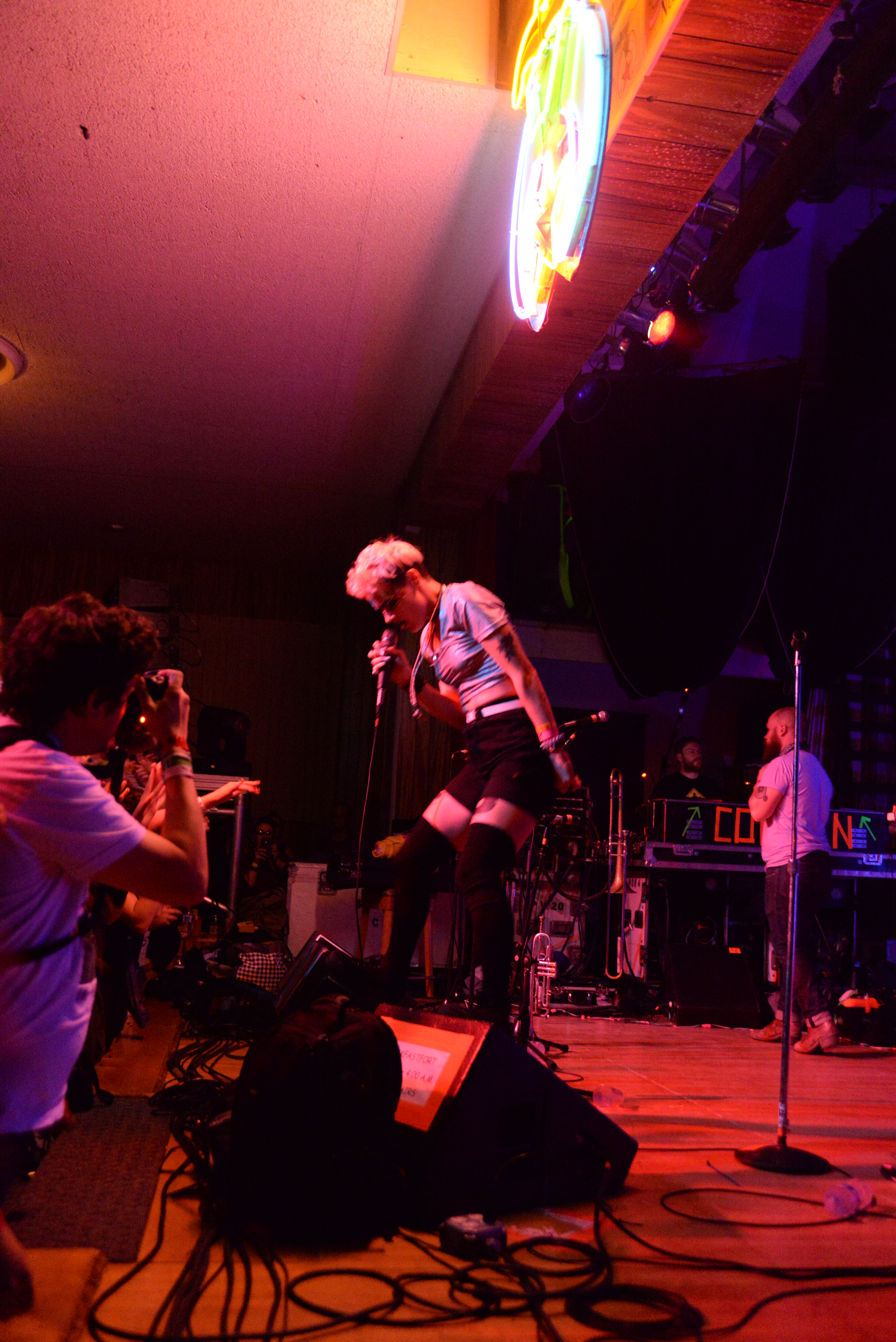
Rubblebucket at Treefort Music Fest in 2015

Also in 2014, Rubblebucket recorded with John Congleton and signed with Communion Records to release Survival Sounds. Paste said about the record, "Survival Sounds should be a victory lap." The album's reception was positive, gaining the support of many online publications and radio stations, such as NPR's Tiny Desk. "Came Out of a Lady" was featured in feature film Drinking Buddies. While on tour, singer Annakalmia Traver was diagnosed with first stage, clear-cell ovarian cancer, and underwent and completed treatment while on tour.

Rubblebucket embarked on a Spring tour that began in March 2015 across the United States, with support from Vacationer. Also in 2015, Rubblebucket performed at the BAM Opera House Master Mix: Red Hot + Arthur Russell in New York City along with other acts including Cults, Dev Hynes, and Arcade Fire.

On October 8, 2016, Rubblebucket supported Brooklyn multi-genre band Lake Street Dive for a series of tour dates across the US, including a performance at Radio City Music Hall.

In 2017, the band released the If U C My Enemies EP and performed on WXPN's World Cafe Live.

In May 2018, Rubblebucket signed to Grand Jury Music and released their fourth full-length album Sun Machine, which saw the band's largest radio reception to date, including full rotation on SiriusXMU and commercial radio across the US. The band announced a Fall and Winter tour headlining bigger rooms and theaters, including Brooklyn Steel in Brooklyn, NY. With the release of Sun Machine was a public acknowledgement that Travers and Toth were continuing a musical partnership although no longer a couple. Paste Magazine noted that Sun Machine is a break up album that is impressively both fun and danceable.

After Toth and Traver ventured with their own solo music projects (Tōth and Kalbells respectively), they returned as Rubblebucket with a new single, "Morning in the Sun", released June 23, 2022. Three more singles followed: "Earth Worship", "Cherry Blossom", and "Geometry", all of which were included on Earth Worship, their fifth studio album. The album was released on October 21, 2022.

The latest album Year of the Banana was released at the end of 2024, based on a book of poetry written by Traver in 2015. They are touring on the album in 2025, which may be their last club tour in some time as Traver and Toth will spend time touring their separate projects.

Rubblebucket's music has been used in several major sync placements, including a Nintendo Switch ad campaign (that first aired during the 2016 Super Bowl), Chanel worldwide campaign and Google Women Techmakers spot.

== Band members ==
Current members

- Annakalmia Traver – lead vocals, tenor and baritone saxophones, flute
- Alex Toth – trumpet, backing vocals, flute, percussion, bandleader

Current touring members

- Sean Smith - trumpet, synth
- Ryan Dugre – guitar
- Stephen Becker – bass, guitar
- Rebecca Lasaponaro – drums

Past members

- Adam Dotson – trombone, backing vocals, flute, keyboards
- Ian Hersey – guitar, backing vocals
- Noga Shefi – bass
- Jeremy Gustin – drums
- David Cole – drums
- Craig Myers - ngoni, percussion

== Discography ==
=== Full-length ===
- Rose's Dream (2008)
- Rubblebucket (2009)
- Omega La La (2011)
- Survival Sounds (2014)
- Sun Machine (2018)
- Earth Worship (2022)
- Year of the Banana (2024)

=== EPs ===
- Triangular Daisies (2010)
- Oversaturated (2012)
- Save Charlie (2013)
- Carousel Ride (2014)
- If U C My Enemies (2017)
- Rattlesnake (2024)
