= Mountain Grass Unit =

American bluegrass band

- Origin: Birmingham, Alabama, United States
- Genre: Bluegrass
- Instruments: guitar; fiddle; mandolin; bass
- Years active: 2018-present
- Label: Dualtone Records
- Award: IBMA Momentum Band of the Year Award (2025)
- Members: Drury Anderson; Luke Black; Sam Wilson; Josiah Nelson
- Website: mountaingrassunit.com

Mountain Grass Unit (MGU) is a four-piece bluegrass band founded in Birmingham, Alabama in 2018. The band consists of members Drury Anderson (lead vocals, mandolin), Luke Black (guitar), Sam Wilson (bass), and Josiah Nelson (fiddle). Unlike typical bluegrass arrangements, MGU does not feature a banjo.

== Description ==
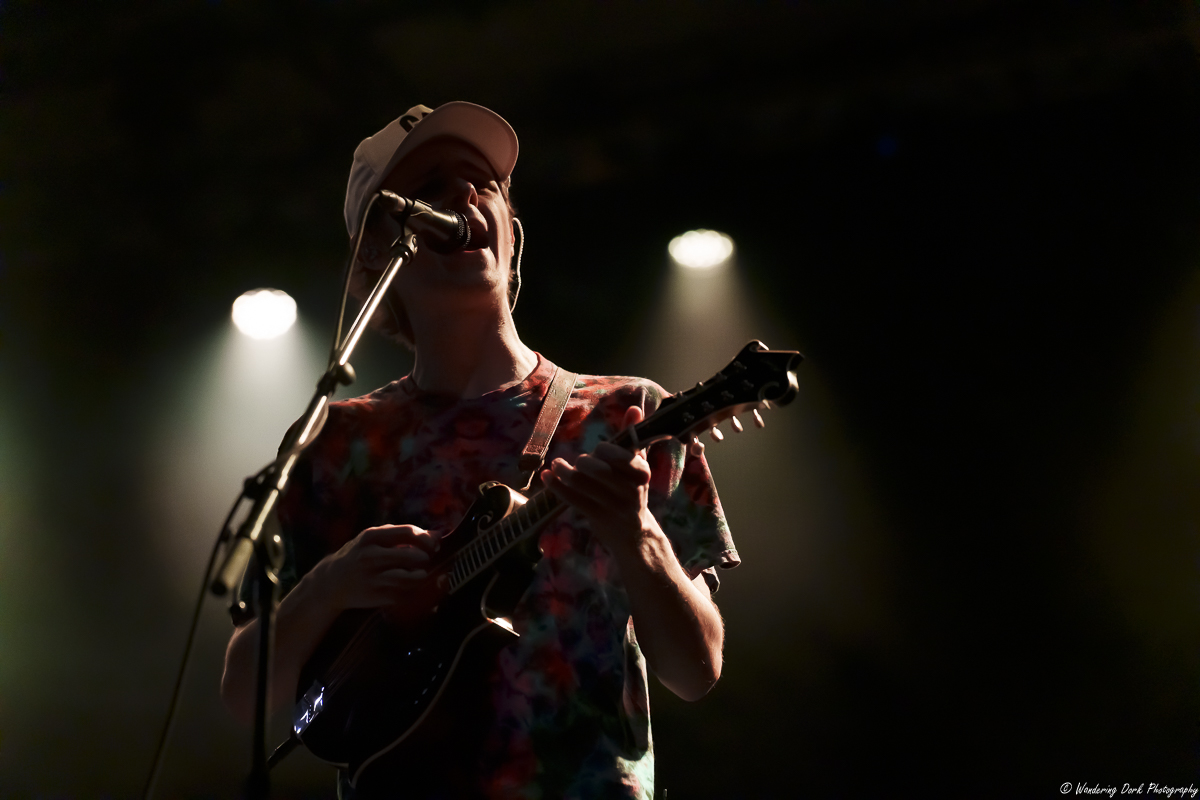
Drury Anderson of Mountain Grass Unit performing in Richmond, Virginia (2025)

The band was formed by three childhood friends and Alabama-natives, Drury Anderson, Luke Black, and Sam Wilson, who have been performing music together since junior high. They were joined by Josiah Nelson, from Colorado, to form a quartet in 2024.

Anderson and Black are graduates of Berklee College of Music.

Black has described the band's sound as "jamgrass", drawing comparisons to The Allman Brothers Band and Grateful Dead.

== Collaboration ==
MGU is a guest performer on Shania Twain's 2026 album Little Miss Twain, appearing on songs Right Time and Dirty Rosie.

== Discography ==
Title	Details
Where I Land - EP	Released: May 19, 2021; Label: Self-published
Places I've Been	Released: July 25, 2022; Label: Self-published
Runnin' From Trouble - EP	Released: September 20, 2024; Label: Self-published
Mountain Grass Unit - EP	Released: June 3, 2026; Label: Dualtone Records
Appalachian Smoke	Released: August 28, 2026; Label: Dualtone Records

== Awards ==
- International Bluegrass Music Association’s Momentum Band of the Year Award (2025)
