= The Older Tour =

2024 concert tour by Lizzy McAlpine

- Tour by Lizzy McAlpine
- Promotional poster for the tour
- Location: North America; Europe
- Associated album: Older
- Start date: April 21, 2024
- End date: October 31, 2024
- Legs: 3
- No. of shows: 34

Lizzy McAlpine concert chronology
- The End of the Movie Tour (2023); The Older Tour (2024); The Over Country Tour (2027)

The Older Tour was the third concert tour by American singer-songwriter Lizzy McAlpine in support of her third studio album, Older (2024). It began on April 21, 2024, in San Diego, and concluded on October 31, 2024, in Dublin, comprising 31 shows across North America, Europe and Oceania. A portion of ticket sales will be donated to LGBTQ Youth charity The Ally Coalition.

== Background ==
Older, Lizzy McAlpine's third studio album was released on April 5, 2024, through RCA Records. It was announced, along with its cover artwork, on February 13, 2024. The lead single of the same name was also released on the same day. To support the album, McAlpine announced her second concert tour, the Older Tour, via social media two days later, along with its first set of dates through cities in the United States, Canada, Belgium, the Netherlands, Germany, France, the United Kingdom, and Ireland. She also stated: "I know it's been a while since I've gone on the road but I needed to figure out a way to do it that would be less taxing on my mental and physical health, and I think we've done that". It includes her biggest Irish headline show to date, the Bonnaroo Music Festival, and the Hinterland Music Festival.

The tour's tickets pre-sale started on Wednesday, February 21, and the general on-sale date was scheduled for Friday, February 23. On the former date, second shows were added in Philadelphia, Washington, New York City, Boston, and Los Angeles. On 7 April, an Australian leg of the tour was announced marking her debut headline tour in Oceania.

== Format ==
In light of the cancellation/rescheduling of European tour dates on her End of the Movie tour due to mental and physical health concerns, she shared that this tour would accommodate that. She has said that Five Seconds Flat and the tour were modeled after a more traditional pop album and concert, but that it did not feel like her and ultimately was difficult to perform.

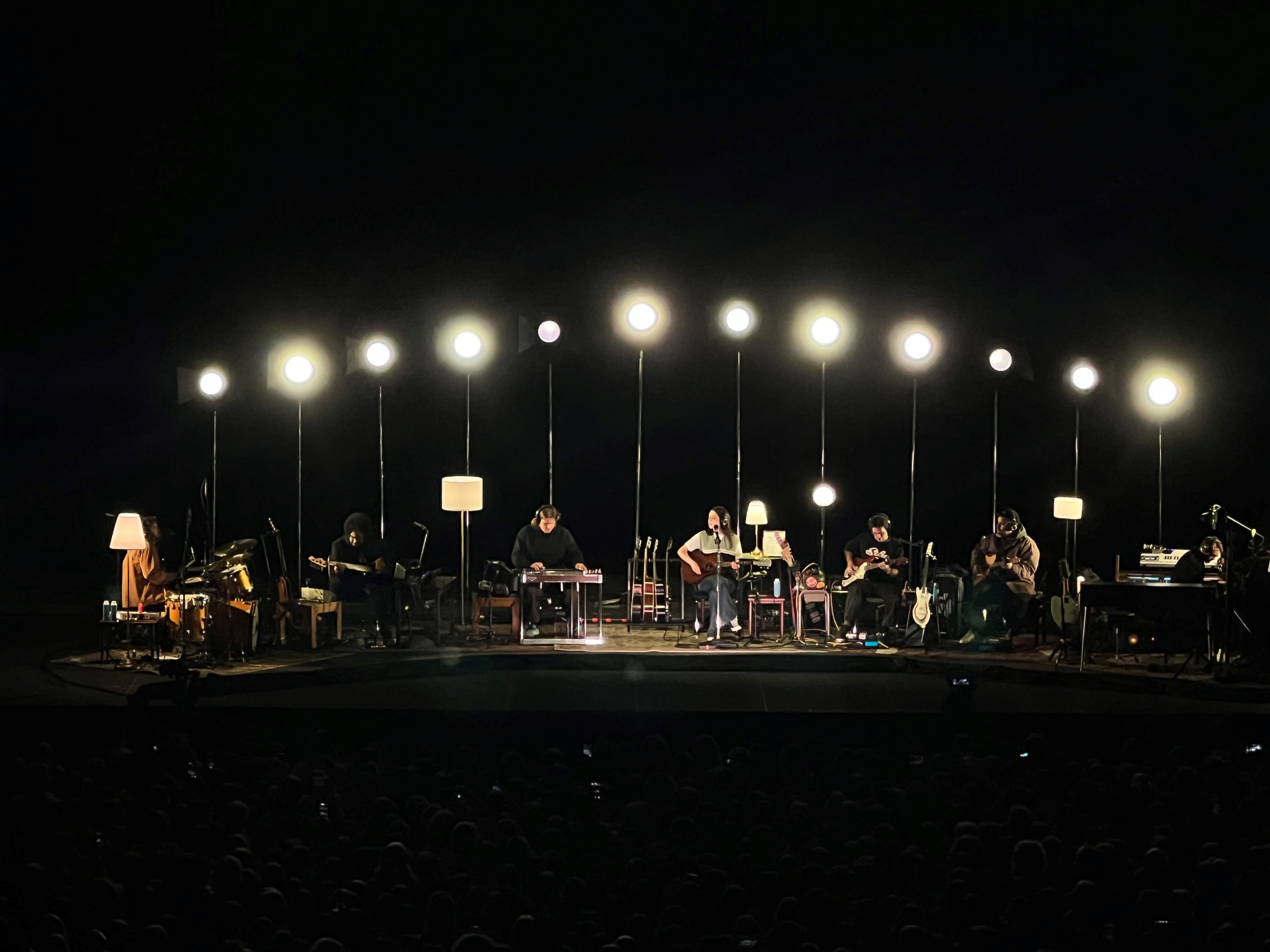
Typical stage setup with McAlpine seated at center stage

Upon entering the venue, attendees are greeted with a homey set that mimics the cabin-like recording studio that she and the band recorded Older in. As the lights dim, the band comes out one by one and starts. McAlpine is the last to come out; she finds her place on the stage and dons a pair of headphones. The show is designed to allow her to focus wholly on the music while performing. Depending on the song being played, she sometimes joins the band with her guitar, or moves to share the piano bench with Taylor Mackall, the album's pianist.

The setlist generally follows the order of the album, with songs from her previous album, Five Seconds Flat, interspersed. This includes "Doomsday, "Ceilings", and "Chemtrails". Notably, "Chemtrails" is preceded by the 13th track on Older, "March", both of which are songs about McAlpine's late father. The 13th song on all of her albums is dedicated to him, as he died on March 12, 2020. Each show typically also includes a surprise song and an unreleased song.

== Set list ==
This setlist is representative of the June 21, 2024 show in Boston. It is not intended to represent all shows from the tour.

1. "The Elevator"
2. "Come Down Soon"
3. "Like It Tends to Do"
4. "Movie Star"
5. "All Falls Down"
6. "Staying"
7. "I Guess"
8. "Doomsday"
9. "Drunk, Running"
10. "Broken Glass"
11. "Lately" (Stevie Wonder cover)
12. "You Forced Me To"
13. "Older"
14. "Better Than This"
15. "March" / "Chemtrails"
16. "Spring Into Summer"
17. "Vortex"

Encore

18. "Orange Show Speedway"
19. "Ceilings"

== Dates ==
List of concerts, showing date, city, country, and venue
Date (2024)	City	Country	Venue
April 21	San Diego	United States	Cal Coast Credit Union Amphitheater
April 24	Morrison	United States	Red Rocks Amphitheatre
May 11	Seattle	United States	WaMu Theater
May 13	Portland	United States	Theater of the Clouds
May 16	San Francisco	United States	Bill Graham Civic Auditorium
May 18	Los Angeles	United States	Greek Theatre
May 19	Los Angeles	United States	Greek Theatre
June 11	Washington	United States	The Anthem
June 12	Washington	United States	The Anthem
June 14 (Note: The show on August 3, 2024 will be part of the Bonnaroo Music Festival.)	Manchester	United States	Great Stage Park
June 18	New York	United States	Radio City Music Hall
June 19	New York	United States	Radio City Music Hall
June 21	Boston	United States	MGM Music Hall at Fenway
June 22	Boston	United States	MGM Music Hall at Fenway
June 24	Philadelphia	United States	The Met
June 25	Philadelphia	United States	The Met
July 12	Brisbane	Australia	Fortitude Music Hall
July 16	Sydney	Australia	Hordern Pavilion
July 18	Melbourne	Australia	Margaret Court Arena
July 31 (Note: The show on July 31, 2024 will be part of the Lollapalooza Aftershows.)	Chicago	United States	Park West
August 1 (Note: The show on August 1, 2024 will be part of the Lollapalooza Festival.)	Chicago	United States	Grant Park
August 3 (Note: The show on August 3, 2024 will be part of the Hinterland Music Festival.)	Saint Charles	United States	Avenue of the Saints Amphitheater
August 6	Detroit	United States	Masonic Temple
August 7	Toronto	Canada	Budweiser Stage
October 13	Antwerp	Belgium	De Roma
October 15	Amsterdam	Netherlands	AFAS Live
October 17	Berlin	Germany	Verti Music Hall
October 19	Cologne	Germany	Palladium
October 21	Paris	France	Zénith - La Villette
October 24	London	England	Eventim Apollo
October 25	London	England	Eventim Apollo
October 27	Manchester	England	O2 Victoria Warehouse
October 28	Birmingham	England	O2 Academy Birmingham
October 31	Dublin	Ireland	3Arena
