= Older =

Older is the comparative form of "old". It may refer to:

== Music ==
- Older (George Michael album), 1996
  - "Older" (George Michael song), 1996
- Older (Lizzy McAlpine album), 2024
  - "Older" (Lizzy McAlpine song), 2024
- "Older" (5 Seconds of Summer song), 2022
- "Older" (Royseven song), 2006
- "Older" (Isabel LaRosa song), 2023
- "Older", a song by Ben Platt from Sing to Me Instead, 2019, also covered by Cliff Richard, 2020
- "Older", a song by Colbie Caillat from Coco, 2007
- "Older", a song by Gracie Abrams from This Is What It Feels Like, 2021
- "Older", a song by Sasha Alex Sloan from Loser, 2018
- "Older", a song by Steve Aoki from Hiroquest 2: Double Helix, 2023
- "Older", a song by They Might Be Giants from Long Tall Weekend, 1999

== People ==
- Airin Older, bass guitarist and supporting vocalist in American rock band Sugarcult
- Charles Older (1917-2006), American World War II flying ace and judge in the Charles Manson trial
- Daniel José Older, American fantasy writer and young adult fiction writer
- Fremont Older (1856–1935), American newspaperman and editor
