= 2012 Australian Open – Day-by-day summaries =

== Day 1 (16 January) ==
In Men's Singles, on the opening day, play began with Local hope Bernard Tomic struggling in the beginning two sets but later working hard in the next three sets, defeating Spaniard Fernando Verdasco. Juan Martín del Potro also had to earn victory by losing the first set but later winning the next three sets defeating Adrian Mannarino. Meanwhile, Rafael Nadal overcomes Alex Kuznetsov. Spaniard Pere Riba had to defeat compatriot Albert Montañés whereas Ukrainian Sergiy Stakhovsky had to defeat his compatriot Illya Marchenko to advance to the second round. Florent Serra advanced to the second round after Steve Darcis was forced to retire in the third set, leading two sets to love, because of leg cramps. Other seeds such as Tomáš Berdych, Mardy Fish, Nicolás Almagro, Alexandr Dolgopolov, John Isner, Stanislas Wawrinka and Kevin Anderson along with Marcos Baghdatis, Olivier Rochus, Tommy Haas, Andreas Beck and Grigor Dimitrov all progressed comfortably into the second round while Juan Mónaco, Ivan Ljubičić and Jürgen Melzer were sent crashing out in the first round. In the evening, Roger beats Alexander Kudryavtsev in three straight tiebreakers and David Nalbandian advanced to the second round after Jarkko Nieminen was forced to retire in the second set because of stomach cramps.

In Women's Singles, on the opening day, play began with Victoria Azarenka taking out Heather Watson in straight sets. Later, the defending champion, Kim Clijsters gets past qualifier Maria João Köhler. Li Na had an easy win over Ksenia Pervak and Francesca Schiavone square off in two straight easy sets defeating Laura Pous Tió. Wild card Casey Dellacqua overcomes Bojana Jovanovski and Jelena Janković cruise into second round defeating qualifier Laura Robson. Mona Barthel advanced to the second round after Anne Keothavong was forced to retire after the first set because of foodborne illness. Other seeds such as Agnieszka Radwańska, Peng Shuai, Daniela Hantuchová, Julia Görges, Monica Niculescu and Petra Cetkovská along with Anna Tatishvili, Romina Oprandi, Pauline Parmentier, wild card Olivia Rogowska, Eleni Daniilidou, Tsvetana Pironkova, Olga Govortsova and Alberta Brianti all progressed comfortably into the second round while Flavia Pennetta, Lucie Šafářová and Yanina Wickmayer were sent crashing out in the first round. In the evening, top seeded Caroline Wozniacki dismantles Anastasia Rodionova in two straight sets advancing to the second round.

- Seeds out
  - Men's Singles: (Spain) Fernando Verdasco [22], (Argentina) Juan Mónaco [25], (Croatia) Ivan Ljubičić [28], (Austria) Jürgen Melzer [31]
  - Women's Singles: (Italy) Flavia Pennetta [19], (Czech Republic) Lucie Šafářová [24], (Belgium) Yanina Wickmayer [28]
- Schedule of Play

Matches on main courts
Matches on Rod Laver Arena
| Event | Winner | Loser | Score |
|---|---|---|---|
| Women's Singles 1st Round | (Belarus) Victoria Azarenka [3] | (United Kingdom) Heather Watson | 6–1, 6–0 |
| Men's Singles 1st Round | (Australia) Bernard Tomic | (Spain) Fernando Verdasco [22] | 4–6, 6–7^{(3–7)}, 6–4, 6–2, 7–5 |
| Women's Singles 1st Round | (Belgium) Kim Clijsters [11] | (Portugal) Maria João Köhler [Q] | 7–5, 6–1 |
| Men's Singles 1st Round | (Switzerland) Roger Federer [3] | (Russia) Alexander Kudryavtsev [Q] | 7–5, 6–2, 6–2 |
| Women's Singles 1st Round | (Denmark) Caroline Wozniacki [1] | (Australia) Anastasia Rodionova | 6–2, 6–1 |
Matches on Hisense Arena
| Event | Winner | Loser | Score |
| Men's Singles 1st Round | (Argentina) Juan Martín del Potro [11] | (France) Adrian Mannarino | 2–6, 6–1, 7–5, 6–4 |
| Women's Singles 1st Round | (China) Li Na [5] | (Kazakhstan) Ksenia Pervak | 6–3, 6–1 |
| Women's Singles 1st Round | (Italy) Francesca Schiavone [10] | (Spain) Laura Pous Tió | 6–1, 6–3 |
| Men's Singles 1st Round | (Spain) Rafael Nadal [2] | (United States) Alex Kuznetsov [Q] | 6–4, 6–1, 6–1 |
Matches on Margaret Court Arena
| Event | Winner | Loser | Score |
| Women's Singles 1st Round | (Australia) Casey Dellacqua [WC] | (Serbia) Bojana Jovanovski | 6–3, 6–2 |
| Men's Singles 1st Round | (Czech Republic) Tomáš Berdych [7] | (Spain) Albert Ramos | 7–5, 4–6, 6–2, 6–3 |
| Men's Singles 1st Round | (Ukraine) Alexandr Dolgopolov[13] | (Australia) Greg Jones [WC] | 1–6, 4–6, 6–1, 6–1, 6–2 |
| Women's Singles 1st Round | (Serbia) Jelena Janković [13] | (United Kingdom) Laura Robson [Q] | 6–2, 6–0 |
| Men's Singles 1st Round | (Argentina) David Nalbandian | (Finland) Jarkko Nieminen | 6–4, 5–2 retired |
Coloured background indicates a night match

== Day 2 (17 January) ==
In Men's Singles, day two play began with Novak Djokovic dismantling Italian Paolo Lorenzi in three straight sets. Andy Murray lost the first set but later won the next three sets defeating Ryan Harrison. Andy Roddick overcomes Robin Haase and David Ferrer had an easy win over Rui Machado. Gaël Monfils defeats local wild card Marinko Matosevic. Frederico Gil advanced to the second round after Ivan Dodig was forced to retire in the fourth set because of shoulder and back injuries. Also, Édouard Roger-Vasselin advanced to the second round after Xavier Malisse was forced to retire after the first set because of an arm injury. Other seeds such as Gilles Simon, Richard Gasquet, Kei Nishikori, Marcel Granollers and Juan Ignacio Chela along with Matthew Ebden, James Duckworth, Santiago Giraldo, Thomaz Bellucci, Tatsuma Ito, Julien Benneteau and Ryan Sweeting all progressed comfortably into the second round while Radek Štěpánek was sent crashing out in the first round. In the evening, Lleyton Hewitt beats Cedrik-Marcel Stebe and Jo-Wilfried Tsonga outlasts Denis Istomin both advancing to the second round.

In Women's Singles, day two play began with Petra Kvitová easing through to the Third round in Rod Laver Arena in straight sets by defeating Vera Dushevina. Maria Sharapova had an easy win advancing to the third round by defeating Gisela Dulko. Fellow compatriot Maria Kirilenko defeats Jarmila Gajdošová. Jelena Dokić overcomes protected ranking Anna Chakvetadze. Svetlana Kuznetsova outlasts Chanelle Scheepers. Other seeds such as Vera Zvonareva, Marion Bartoli, Sabine Lisicki, Dominika Cibulková, Ana Ivanovic and Angelique Kerber along with Jamie Hampton, Sloane Stephens, Ekaterina Makarova, Shahar Pe'er, Aleksandra Wozniak, Zheng Jie, Lucie Hradecká, Gréta Arn, Stéphanie Dubois and Barbora Záhlavová-Strýcová all progressed comfortably into the second round while Sorana Cîrstea impresses in the fourth round by defeating sixth seeded and US Open defending champion Samantha Stosur. In the evening, five-time champion Serena Williams advances to the second round by defeating Tamira Paszek.

- Seeds out:
  - Men's Singles: (Czech Republic) Radek Štěpánek [29]
  - Women's Singles: (Australia) Samantha Stosur[6]
- Schedule of Play

Matches on main courts
Matches on Rod Laver Arena
| Event | Winner | Loser | Score |
|---|---|---|---|
| Women's Singles 1st Round | (Czech Republic) Petra Kvitová [2] | (Russia) Vera Dushevina | 6–2, 6–0 |
| Men's Singles 1st Round | (Serbia) Novak Djokovic [1] | (Italy) Paolo Lorenzi | 6–2, 6–0, 6–0 |
| Women's Singles 1st Round | (Romania) Sorana Cîrstea | (Australia) Samantha Stosur[6] | 7–6^{(7–2)}, 6–3 |
| Men's Singles 1st Round | (Australia) Lleyton Hewitt [WC] | (Germany) Cedrik-Marcel Stebe | 7–5, 6–4, 3–6, 7–5 |
| Women's Singles 1st Round | (United States) Serena Williams [12] | (Austria) Tamira Paszek | 6–3, 6–2 |
Matches on Hisense Arena
| Event | Winner | Loser | Score |
| Women's Singles 1st Round | (Russia) Maria Kirilenko [27] | (Australia) Jarmila Gajdošová | 6–4, 6–2 |
| Women's Singles 1st Round | (Russia) Maria Sharapova [4] | (Argentina) Gisela Dulko | 6–0, 6–1 |
| Men's Singles 1st Round | (United Kingdom) Andy Murray [4] | (United States) Ryan Harrison | 4–6, 6–3, 6–4, 6–2 |
| Men's Singles 1st Round | (United States) Andy Roddick [15] | (Netherlands) Robin Haase | 6–3, 6–4, 6–1 |
Matches on Margaret Court Arena
| Event | Winner | Loser | Score |
| Men's Singles 1st Round | (Spain) David Ferrer [5] | (Portugal) Rui Machado | 6–1, 6–4, 6–2 |
| Women's Singles 1st Round | (Australia) Jelena Dokić | (Russia) Anna Chakvetadze [PR] | 6–2, 6–1 |
| Men's Singles 1st Round | (France) Gaël Monfils [14] | (Australia) Marinko Matosevic [WC] | 7–6^{(7–5)}, 6–3, 6–3 |
| Women's Singles 1st Round | (Russia) Svetlana Kuznetsova [18] | (South Africa) Chanelle Scheepers | 6–3, 3–6, 6–0 |
| Men's Singles 1st Round | (France) Jo-Wilfried Tsonga [6] | (Uzbekistan) Denis Istomin | 6–4, 3–6, 6–2, 7–5 |
Coloured background indicates a night match

== Day 3 (18 January) ==
Men's Singles on day 3 began with Nadal having straight sets easy win on protected ranking Haas. Berdych wins over Rochus while Dolgopolov knocked out Tobias Kamke. Roger received a walkover into the third round after Andreas Beck withdrew from the tournament because of a lower back injury. Nalbandian puts up a fight but Isner advances to the third round. Philipp Kohlschreiber advanced to the third round after Pere Riba was forced to retire in the second set because of a left foot injury. Other seeds such as Nicolás Almagro, Juan Martín del Potro, Feliciano López and Kevin Anderson along with qualifier Lukáš Lacko, Lu Yen-hsun and Ivo Karlović advance to the third round except Mardy Fish who lost to Colombian Alejandro Falla. Later in the evening, Tomic outlasts Querrey while Stanislas Wawrinka beats Marcos Baghdatis moving into the third round.

Women's Singles on day 3 began with Li Na taking out local home wild card Rogowska in straight sets. Clijsters also progressed overcoming Stéphanie Foretz Gacon. Azarenka too had an easy win in straight sets over local wild card Casey Dellacqua. Janković outlasts qualifier Chang Kai-chen while top seeded dane Wozniacki beat Tatishvili cruising into third round. Hantuchová defeated Lesia Tsurenko after losing the first set. Julia Görges advanced to the third round after Eleni Daniilidou was forced to retire during the second set because of a neck injury. Other seeds such as Agnieszka Radwańska, Anabel Medina Garrigues and Monica Niculescu along with Christina McHale, Nina Bratchikova and Galina Voskoboeva advanced to the third round. The second round witnessed all the seeds go through except Schiavone went out to compatriot Oprandi, Peng to Benešová and Cetkovská to Barthel.

- Seeds out:
  - Men's Singles: (United States) Mardy Fish [8]
  - Women's Singles: (Italy) Francesca Schiavone [10], (China) Peng Shuai [16], (Czech Republic) Petra Cetkovská [32]
- Schedule of Play

Matches on main courts
Matches on Rod Laver Arena
| Event | Winner | Loser | Score |
|---|---|---|---|
| Women's Singles 2nd Round | (China) Li Na [5] | (Australia) Olivia Rogowska [WC] | 6–2, 6–2 |
| Women's Singles 2nd Round | (Belgium) Kim Clijsters [11] | (France) Stéphanie Foretz Gacon | 6–0, 6–1 |
| Men's Singles 2nd Round | (Spain) Rafael Nadal [2] | (Germany) Tommy Haas [PR] | 6–4, 6–3, 6–4 |
| Men's Singles 2nd Round | (Australia) Bernard Tomic | (United States) Sam Querrey | 3–6, 6–3, 7–6^{(7–3)}, 6–3 |
| Women's Singles 2nd Round | (Belarus) Victoria Azarenka [3] | (Australia) Casey Dellacqua [WC] | 6–1, 6–0 |
Matches on Hisense Arena
| Event | Winner | Loser | Score |
| Men's Singles 2nd Round | (Czech Republic) Tomáš Berdych [7] | (Belgium) Olivier Rochus | 6–1, 6–0, 7–6^{(7–4)} |
| Women's Singles 2nd Round | (Serbia) Jelena Janković [13] | (Chinese Taipei) Chang Kai-chen [Q] | 6–4, 6–2 |
| Women's Singles 2nd Round | (Denmark) Caroline Wozniacki [1] | (Georgia (country)) Anna Tatishvili | 6–1, 7–6^{(7–4)} |
| Men's Singles 2nd Round | (Ukraine) Alexandr Dolgopolov [13] | (Germany) Tobias Kamke | 4–6, 6–1, 6–1, 3–6, 8–6 |
| Men's Singles 2nd Round | (Switzerland) Roger Federer [3] | (Germany) Andreas Beck | Walkover |
Matches on Margaret Court Arena
| Event | Winner | Loser | Score |
| Women's Singles 2nd Round | (Slovakia) Daniela Hantuchová [20] | (Ukraine) Lesia Tsurenko | 4–6, 6–4, 6–3 |
| Women's Singles 2nd Round | (Italy) Romina Oprandi | (Italy) Francesca Schiavone [10] | 6–4, 6–3 |
| Men's Singles 2nd Round | (United States) John Isner [16] | (Argentina) David Nalbandian | 4–6, 6–3, 2–6, 7–6^{(7–5)}, 10–8 |
| Men's Singles 2nd Round | (Switzerland) Stanislas Wawrinka [21] | (Cyprus) Marcos Baghdatis | 7–6^{(7–3)}, 6–4, 5–7, 6–1 |
Coloured background indicates a night match

== Day 4 (19 January) ==
The fourth day in Men's Singles, began with seeded number one, Djokovic easing through to the third round in Rod Laver Arena in straight sets defeating Santiago Giraldo. Tsonga takes out Ricardo Mello progressing in straight sets while Murray also had an easy win over Édouard Roger-Vasselin. Janko Tipsarević after losing the first set beat local wild card James Duckworth while another local Matthew Ebden puts up a fight winning first two sets but Kei Nishikori advances defeating him in later three sets. Gaël Monfils knocks out Thomaz Bellucci. Richard Gasquet advanced to the third round after Andrey Golubev was forced to retire in the third set because of injury. Gilles Simon went out to compatriot Julien Benneteau. Other seeds such as David Ferrer, Milos Raonic and Juan Ignacio Chela along with Nicolas Mahut advance to the third round while Viktor Troicki, Marcel Granollers and Alex Bogomolov Jr. were sent crashing out in the second round. In the evening, local hope Lleyton Hewitt advanced to the third round after Andy Roddick was forced to retire in the third set because of a hamstring injury.

The fourth day in Women's Singles, began with Sharapova having an easy win over qualifier Jamie Hampton and Serena easing through to the third round in Rod Laver Arena in straight sets defeating Barbora Záhlavová-Strýcová. Ana Ivanovic outlasts Michaëlla Krajicek while Petra Kvitová overcomes Carla Suárez Navarro to reach the second round. Vera Zvonareva defeated Lucie Hradecká. Other seeds such as Sabine Lisicki, Maria Kirilenko and Angelique Kerber along with Sorana Cîrstea advance to the third round. The second round witnessed all the seeds go through except Anastasia Pavlyuchenkova, Dominika Cibulková, Roberta Vinci, Kaia Kanepi and Nadia Petrova were sent crashing out in the second round. In the evening, the last home contingent, Jelena Dokić lost in the second round to Marion Bartoli while Sloane Stephens lost to Svetlana Kuznetsova.

- Seeds out:
  - Men's Singles: (France) Gilles Simon [12], (United States) Andy Roddick [15], (Serbia) Viktor Troicki [19], (Spain) Marcel Granollers [26], (Russia) Alex Bogomolov Jr. [32]
  - Women's Singles: (Russia) Anastasia Pavlyuchenkova [15], (Slovakia) Dominika Cibulková [17], (Italy) Roberta Vinci [23], (Estonia) Kaia Kanepi [25], (Russia) Nadia Petrova [29]
  - Men's Doubles: (Austria) Oliver Marach / (Austria) Alexander Peya [9], (Australia) Paul Hanley / (United Kingdom) Jamie Murray [16]
  - Women's Doubles: (United States) Raquel Kops-Jones / (United States) Abigail Spears [15]
- Schedule of Play

Matches on main courts
Matches on Rod Laver Arena
| Event | Winner | Loser | Score |
|---|---|---|---|
| Women's Singles 2nd Round | (Russia) Maria Sharapova [4] | (United States) Jamie Hampton [Q] | 6–0, 6–1 |
| Women's Singles 2nd Round | (United States) Serena Williams [12] | (Czech Republic) Barbora Záhlavová-Strýcová | 6–0, 6–4 |
| Men's Singles 2nd Round | (Serbia) Novak Djokovic [1] | (Colombia) Santiago Giraldo | 6–3, 6–2, 6–1 |
| Women's Singles 2nd Round | (France) Marion Bartoli [9] | (Australia) Jelena Dokić | 6–3, 6–2 |
| Men's Singles 2nd Round | (Australia) Lleyton Hewitt [WC] | (United States) Andy Roddick [15] | 3–6, 6–3, 6–4 retired |
Matches on Hisense Arena
| Event | Winner | Loser | Score |
| Women's Singles 2nd Round | (Serbia) Ana Ivanovic [21] | (Netherlands) Michaëlla Krajicek | 6–2, 6–3 |
| Men's Singles 2nd Round | (France) Jo-Wilfried Tsonga [6] | (Brazil) Ricardo Mello | 7–5, 6–4, 6–4 |
| Women's Singles 2nd Round | (Czech Republic) Petra Kvitová [2] | (Spain) Carla Suárez Navarro | 6–2, 2–6, 6–4 |
| Men's Singles 2nd Round | (United Kingdom) Andy Murray [4] | (France) Édouard Roger-Vasselin | 6–1, 6–4, 6–4 |
Matches on Margaret Court Arena
| Event | Winner | Loser | Score |
| Women's Singles 2nd Round | (Russia) Vera Zvonareva [7] | (Czech Republic) Lucie Hradecká | 6–1, 7–6^{(7–3)} |
| Men's Singles 2nd Round | (Serbia) Janko Tipsarević [9] | (Australia) James Duckworth [WC] | 3–6, 6–2, 7–6^{(7–5)}, 6–4 |
| Men's Singles 2nd Round | (Japan) Kei Nishikori [24] | (Australia) Matthew Ebden | 3–6, 1–6, 6–4, 6–1, 6–1 |
| Men's Singles 2nd Round | (France) Gaël Monfils [14] | (Brazil) Thomaz Bellucci | 2–6, 6–0, 6–4, 6–2 |
Coloured background indicates a night match

== Day 5 (20 January) ==
On the fifth day, in Men's Singles, Nadal beats qualifier Lukáš Lacko in three straight sets while Federer defeats Ivo Karlović. Feliciano López wins five-set thriller over John Isner. Tomáš Berdych outlasts Kevin Anderson while Nicolás Almagro overcomes Stanislas Wawrinka. Alejandro Falla losses to Philipp Kohlschreiber. In the evening, thirteenth seed Alexandr Dolgopolov went out to Bernard Tomic and Juan Martín del Potro overwhelms Lu Yen-hsun, both advancing to the fourth round.

In Women's Singles, Jelena Janković rolls by Christina McHale while Azarenka gets past Mona Barthel advancing to the fourth round. Seeded number one dane, Wozniacki outlasts Monica Niculescu while Galina Voskoboeva losses to Agnieszka Radwańska and Romina Oprandi went to Julia Görges. Iveta Benešová takes out qualifier Nina Bratchikova in straight sets. In the evening, Li Na advanced to the fourth round after Anabel Medina Garrigues was forced to retire during the first set because of a right ankle injury while Kim Clijsters defeats Daniela Hantuchová advancing to the fourth round.

- Seeds out:
  - Men's Singles: (Ukraine) Alexandr Dolgopolov [13], (United States) John Isner [16], (Switzerland) Stanislas Wawrinka [21], (South Africa) Kevin Anderson [30]
  - Women's Singles: (Slovakia) Daniela Hantuchová [20], (Spain) Anabel Medina Garrigues [26], (Romania) Monica Niculescu [31]
  - Men's Doubles: (Italy) Simone Bolelli / (Italy) Fabio Fognini [14]
  - Women's Doubles: (Spain) Nuria Llagostera Vives / (Spain) Arantxa Parra Santonja [13], (Russia) Vera Dushevina / (Israel) Shahar Pe'er [16]
- Schedule of Play

Matches on main courts
Matches on Rod Laver Arena
| Event | Winner | Loser | Score |
|---|---|---|---|
| Men's Singles 3rd Round | (Spain) Rafael Nadal [2] | (Slovakia) Lukáš Lacko [Q] | 6–2, 6–4, 6–2 |
| Men's Singles 3rd Round | (Switzerland) Roger Federer [3] | (Croatia) Ivo Karlović | 7–6^{(8–6)}, 7–5, 6–3 |
| Women's Singles 3rd Round | (Serbia) Jelena Janković [13] | (United States) Christina McHale | 6–2, 6–0 |
| Men's Singles 3rd Round | (Australia) Bernard Tomic | (Ukraine) Alexandr Dolgopolov [13] | 4–6, 7–6^{(7–0)}, 7–6^{(8–6)}, 2–6, 6–3 |
| Women's Singles 3rd Round | (China) Li Na [5] | (Spain) Anabel Medina Garrigues [26] | 3–0 retired |
Matches on Hisense Arena
| Event | Winner | Loser | Score |
| Women's Singles 3rd Round | (Belarus) Victoria Azarenka [3] | (Germany) Mona Barthel | 6–2, 6–4 |
| Women's Singles 3rd Round | (Denmark) Caroline Wozniacki [1] | (Romania) Monica Niculescu [31] | 6–2, 6–2 |
| Men's Singles 3rd Round | (Spain) Feliciano López [18] | (United States) John Isner [16] | 6–3, 6–7^{(3–7)}, 6–4, 6–7^{(0–7)}, 6–1 |
| Women's Singles 3rd Round | (Belgium) Kim Clijsters [11] | (Slovakia) Daniela Hantuchová [20] | 6–3, 6–2 |
| Men's Singles 3rd Round | (Argentina) Juan Martín del Potro [11] | (Chinese Taipei) Lu Yen-hsun | 6–2, 6–3, 6–0 |
Matches on Margaret Court Arena
| Event | Winner | Loser | Score |
| Men's Doubles 2nd Round | (India) Leander Paes (Czech Republic) Radek Štěpánek | (Italy) Simone Bolelli [14] (Italy) Fabio Fognini [14] | 6–2, 7–6^{(7–5)} |
| Women's Singles 3rd Round | (Poland) Agnieszka Radwańska [8] | (Kazakhstan) Galina Voskoboeva | 6–2, 6–2 |
| Men's Singles 3rd Round | (Czech Republic) Tomáš Berdych [7] | (South Africa) Kevin Anderson [30] | 7–6^{(7–5)}, 7–6^{(7–1)}, 6–1 |
| Men's Doubles 2nd Round | (Sweden) Robert Lindstedt [7] (Romania) Horia Tecău [7] | (Australia) Colin Ebelthite (Australia) Marinko Matosevic | 3–6, 6–4, 6–2 |
Coloured background indicates a night match

== Day 6 (21 January) ==
- Seeds out:
  - Men's Singles: (Serbia) Janko Tipsarević [9], (France) Gaël Monfils [14], (Canada) Milos Raonic [23], (Argentina) Juan Ignacio Chela [27]
  - Women's Singles: (Russia) Vera Zvonareva [7], (France) Marion Bartoli [9], (Russia) Svetlana Kuznetsova [18], (Russia) Maria Kirilenko [27], (Germany) Angelique Kerber [30]
  - Women's Doubles: (Czech Republic) Květa Peschke / (Slovenia) Katarina Srebotnik [1], (South Africa) Natalie Grandin / (Czech Republic) Vladimíra Uhlířová [9], (Czech Republic) Iveta Benešová / (Czech Republic) Barbora Záhlavová-Strýcová [10], (Chinese Taipei) Hsieh Su-wei / (Kazakhstan) Galina Voskoboeva [14]
  - Mixed Doubles: (Russia) Maria Kirilenko / (Canada) Daniel Nestor [3]
- Schedule of Play

Matches on main courts
Matches on Rod Laver Arena
| Event | Winner | Loser | Score |
|---|---|---|---|
| Women's Singles 3rd Round | (Czech Republic) Petra Kvitová [2] | (Russia) Maria Kirilenko [27] | 6–0, 1–0 retired |
| Women's Singles 3rd Round | (Russia) Maria Sharapova [4] | (Germany) Angelique Kerber [30] | 6–1, 6–2 |
| Men's Singles 3rd Round | (Serbia) Novak Djokovic [1] | (France) Nicolas Mahut | 6–0, 6–1, 6–1 |
| Men's Doubles 3rd Round | (India) Mahesh Bhupathi (India) Rohan Bopanna | (Australia) Carsten Ball (Philippines) Treat Conrad Huey | 6–2, 6–2 |
| Women's Singles 3rd Round | (United States) Serena Williams [12] | (Hungary) Gréta Arn | 6–1, 6–1 |
| Men's Singles 3rd Round | (Australia) Lleyton Hewitt [WC] | (Canada) Milos Raonic [23] | 4–6, 6–3, 7–6^{(7–5)}, 6–3 |
Matches on Hisense Arena
| Event | Winner | Loser | Score |
| Men's Singles 3rd Round | (France) Jo-Wilfried Tsonga [6] | (Portugal) Frederico Gil | 6–2, 6–2, 6–2 |
| Women's Singles 3rd Round | (Serbia) Ana Ivanovic [21] | (United States) Vania King | 6–3, 6–4 |
| Women's Singles 3rd Round | (Germany) Sabine Lisicki [14] | (Russia) Svetlana Kuznetsova [18] | 2–6, 6–4, 6–2 |
| Men's Singles 3rd Round | (United Kingdom) Andy Murray [4] | (France) Michaël Llodra | 6–4, 6–2, 6–0 |
| Legends Doubles | (Iran) Mansour Bahrami (France) Cédric Pioline | (Australia) Pat Cash (Croatia) Goran Ivanišević | 2–6, 6–2, [13–11] |
Matches on Margaret Court Arena
| Event | Winner | Loser | Score |
| Legend Doubles | (France) Guy Forget (France) Henri Leconte | (Australia) Darren Cahill (Australia) Richard Fromberg | 6–1, 6–4 |
| Women's Singles 3rd Round | (Russia) Ekaterina Makarova | (Russia) Vera Zvonareva [7] | 7–6^{(9–7)}, 6–1 |
| Men's Singles 3rd Round | (France) Richard Gasquet [17] | (Serbia) Janko Tipsarević [9] | 6–3, 6–3, 6–1 |
| Men's Singles 3rd Round | (Kazakhstan) Mikhail Kukushkin | (France) Gaël Monfils [14] | 6–2, 7–5, 5–7, 1–6, 6–4 |
Coloured background indicates a night match

== Day 7 (22 January) ==
- Seeds out:
  - Men's Singles: (Spain) Nicolás Almagro [10], (Spain) Feliciano López [18]
  - Women's Singles: (China) Li Na [5], (Serbia) Jelena Janković [13], (Germany) Julia Görges [22]
  - Men's Doubles: (France) Michaël Llodra / (Serbia) Nenad Zimonjić [3], (India) Mahesh Bhupathi / (India) Rohan Bopanna [4], (United Kingdom) Colin Fleming / (United Kingdom) Ross Hutchins [15]
  - Women's Doubles: (Argentina) Gisela Dulko / (Italy) Flavia Pennetta [4]
  - Mixed Doubles: (Czech Republic) Květa Peschke / (United States) Mike Bryan [1]
- Schedule of Play

Matches on main courts
Matches on Rod Laver Arena
| Event | Winner | Loser | Score |
|---|---|---|---|
| Women's Singles 4th Round | (Belarus) Victoria Azarenka [3] | (Czech Republic) Iveta Benešová | 6–2, 6–2 |
| Men's Singles 4th Round | (Spain) Rafael Nadal [2] | (Spain) Feliciano López [18] | 6–4, 6–4, 6–2 |
| Women's Singles 4th Round | (Belgium) Kim Clijsters [11] | (China) Li Na [5] | 4–6, 7–6^{(8–6)}, 6–4 |
| Men's Singles 4th Round | (Switzerland) Roger Federer [3] | (Australia) Bernard Tomic | 6–4, 6–2, 6–2 |
| Women's Singles 4th Round | (Denmark) Caroline Wozniacki [1] | (Serbia) Jelena Janković [13] | 6–0, 7–5 |
Matches on Hisense Arena
| Event | Winner | Loser | Score |
| Men's Doubles 3rd Round | (United States) Bob Bryan [1] (United States) Mike Bryan [1] | (United Kingdom) Colin Fleming [15] (United Kingdom) Ross Hutchins [15] | 6–4, 0–6, 6–2 |
| Women's Singles 4th Round | (Poland) Agnieszka Radwańska [8] | (Germany) Julia Görges [22] | 6–1, 6–1 |
| Men's Singles 4th Round | (Czech Republic) Tomáš Berdych [7] | (Spain) Nicolás Almagro [10] | 4–6, 7–6^{(7–5)}, 7–6^{(7–3)}, 7–6^{(7–2)} |
| Men's Legends Doubles | (Australia) Wayne Arthurs (Austria) Thomas Muster | (Netherlands) Jacco Eltingh (Netherlands) Paul Haarhuis | 7–5, 6–1 |
Matches on Margaret Court Arena
| Event | Winner | Loser | Score |
| Women's Doubles 3rd Round | (Russia) Svetlana Kuznetsova (Russia) Vera Zvonareva | (Argentina) Gisela Dulko [4] (Italy) Flavia Pennetta [4] | 3–6, 6–3, 7–6^{(7–4)} |
| Women's Legends Doubles | (Australia) Nicole Bradtke (United States) Martina Navratilova | (Switzerland) Martina Hingis (Croatia) Iva Majoli | 6–1, 6–3 |
| Mixed Doubles 1st Round | (Japan) Kimiko Date-Krumm (Japan) Kei Nishikori | (Argentina) Gisela Dulko (Argentina) Eduardo Schwank | 6–4, 6–1 |
| Men's Singles 4th Round | (Argentina) Juan Martín del Potro [11] | (Germany) Philipp Kohlschreiber | 6–4, 6–2, 6–1 |
| Mixed Doubles 1st Round | (Australia) Casey Dellacqua [WC] (Australia) Matthew Ebden [WC] | (Australia) Olivia Rogowska [WC] (Australia) Marinko Matosevic [WC] | 6–4, 6–2 |
Coloured background indicates a night match

== Day 8 (23 January) ==
- Seeds out:
  - Men's Singles: (France) Jo-Wilfried Tsonga [6], (France) Richard Gasquet [17]
  - Women's Singles: (United States) Serena Williams [12], (Germany) Sabine Lisicki [14], (Serbia) Ana Ivanovic [21]
  - Men's Doubles: (Austria) Jürgen Melzer / (Germany) Philipp Petzschner [5], (Pakistan) Aisam-ul-Haq Qureshi / (Curaçao) Jean-Julien Rojer [8], (Czech Republic) František Čermák / (Slovakia) Filip Polášek [11]
  - Women's Doubles: (Russia) Maria Kirilenko / (Russia) Nadia Petrova [5], (Slovakia) Daniela Hantuchová / (Poland) Agnieszka Radwańska [8], (Australia) Jarmila Gajdošová / (United States) Bethanie Mattek-Sands [12]
- Schedule of Play

Matches on main courts
Matches on Rod Laver Arena
| Event | Winner | Loser | Score |
|---|---|---|---|
| Women's Singles 4th Round | (Czech Republic) Petra Kvitová [2] | (Serbia) Ana Ivanovic [21] | 6–2, 7–6^{(7–2)} |
| Men's Singles 4th Round | (United Kingdom) Andy Murray [4] | (Kazakhstan) Mikhail Kukushkin | 6–1, 6–1, 1–0 retired |
| Women's Singles 4th Round | (Russia) Ekaterina Makarova | (United States) Serena Williams [12] | 6–2, 6–3 |
| Mixed Doubles 2nd Round | (United States) Lisa Raymond [4] (India) Rohan Bopanna [4] | (Australia) Casey Dellacqua [WC] (Australia) Matthew Ebden [WC] | 6–4, 6–2 |
| Women's Singles 4th Round | (Russia) Maria Sharapova [4] | (Germany) Sabine Lisicki [14] | 3–6, 6–2, 6–3 |
| Men's Singles 4th Round | (Serbia) Novak Djokovic [1] | (Australia) Lleyton Hewitt [WC] | 6–1, 6–3, 4–6, 6–3 |
Matches on Hisense Arena
| Event | Winner | Loser | Score |
| Men's Legends Doubles | (France) Guy Forget (France) Henri Leconte | (Australia) Todd Woodbridge (Australia) Mark Woodforde | 6–4, 7–5 |
| Men's Singles 4th Round | (Japan) Kei Nishikori [24] | (France) Jo-Wilfried Tsonga [6] | 2–6, 6–2, 6–1, 3–6, 6–3 |
| Men's Singles 4th Round | (Spain) David Ferrer [5] | (France) Richard Gasquet [17] | 6–4, 6–4, 6–1 |
Matches on Margaret Court Arena
| Event | Winner | Loser | Score |
| Women's Doubles 3rd Round | (Czech Republic) Andrea Hlaváčková [7] (Czech Republic) Lucie Hradecká [7] | (Japan) Rika Fujiwara (Japan) Ayumi Morita | 6–3, 3–6, 6–2 |
| Women's Singles 4th Round | (Italy) Sara Errani | (China) Zheng Jie | 6–2, 6–1 |
| Women's Doubles 3rd Round | (India) Sania Mirza [6] (Russia) Elena Vesnina [6] | (Australia) Jarmila Gajdošová [12] (United States) Bethanie Mattek-Sands [12] | 7–5, 6–3 |
| Mixed Doubles 2nd Round | (Czech Republic) Andrea Hlaváčková [7] (Pakistan) Aisam-ul-Haq Qureshi [7] | (Serbia) Jelena Janković [WC] (Australia) Bernard Tomic [WC] | 6–3, 6–3 |
Coloured background indicates a night match

== Day 9 (24 January) ==
- Seeds out:
  - Men's Singles: (Czech Republic) Tomáš Berdych [7], (Argentina) Juan Martín del Potro [11]
  - Women's Singles: (Denmark) Caroline Wozniacki [1], (Poland) Agnieszka Radwańska [8]
  - Men's Doubles: (Poland) Mariusz Fyrstenberg / (Poland) Marcin Matkowski [6], (United States) Scott Lipsky / (United States) Rajeev Ram [13]
  - Women's Doubles: (United States) Liezel Huber / (United States) Lisa Raymond [2], (United States) Vania King / (Kazakhstan) Yaroslava Shvedova [3]
- Schedule of Play

Matches on main courts
Matches on Rod Laver Arena
| Event | Winner | Loser | Score |
|---|---|---|---|
| Legends Doubles | (Australia) Wayne Arthurs (Austria) Thomas Muster | (Australia) Pat Cash (Croatia) Goran Ivanišević | 6–4, 6–3 |
| Women's Singles Quarterfinals | (Belarus) Victoria Azarenka [3] | (Poland) Agnieszka Radwańska [8] | 6–7^{(0–7)}, 6–0, 6–2 |
| Women's Singles Quarterfinals | (Belgium) Kim Clijsters [11] | (Denmark) Caroline Wozniacki [1] | 6–3, 7–6^{(7–4)} |
| Men's Singles Quarterfinals | (Switzerland) Roger Federer [3] | (Argentina) Juan Martín del Potro [11] | 6–4, 6–3, 6–2 |
| Men's Singles Quarterfinals | (Spain) Rafael Nadal [2] | (Czech Republic) Tomáš Berdych [7] | 6–7^{(5–7)}, 7–6^{(8–6)}, 6–4, 6–3 |
| Men's Doubles Quarterfinals | (United States) Bob Bryan [1] (United States) Mike Bryan [1] | (Poland) Mariusz Fyrstenberg [6] (Poland) Marcin Matkowski [6] | 6–4, 6–7^{(4–7)}, 6–4 |
Matches on Margaret Court Arena
| Event | Winner | Loser | Score |
| Women's Doubles Quarterfinals | (Russia) Svetlana Kuznetsova (Russia) Vera Zvonareva | (Romania) Irina-Camelia Begu (Romania) Monica Niculescu | 7–5, 6–3 |
| Men's Doubles Quarterfinals | (Sweden) Robert Lindstedt [7] (Romania) Horia Tecău [7] | (United States) Scott Lipsky [13] (United States) Rajeev Ram [13] | 6–4, 6–4 |
| Women's Doubles Quarterfinals | (India) Sania Mirza [6] (Russia) Elena Vesnina [6] | (United States) Liezel Huber [2] (United States) Lisa Raymond [2] | 6–3, 5–7, 7–6^{(8–6)} |
| Women's Legends Doubles | (United States) Tracy Austin (Austria) Barbara Schett | (Australia) Nicole Bradtke (United States) Martina Navratilova | 2–6, 7–6^{(11–9)}, [10–4] |
Coloured background indicates a night match

== Day 10 (25 January) ==
- Seeds out:
  - Men's Singles: (Spain) David Ferrer [5], (Japan) Kei Nishikori [24]
  - Men's Doubles: (United States) Eric Butorac / (Brazil) Bruno Soares [10], (Mexico) Santiago González / (Germany) Christopher Kas [12]
  - Women's Doubles: (India) Sania Mirza / (Russia) Elena Vesnina [6], (Czech Republic) Andrea Hlaváčková / (Czech Republic) Lucie Hradecká [7]
  - Mixed Doubles: (Czech Republic) Andrea Hlaváčková / (Pakistan) Aisam-ul-Haq Qureshi [7]
- Schedule of Play

Matches on main courts
Matches on Rod Laver Arena
| Event | Winner | Loser | Score |
|---|---|---|---|
| Women's Singles Quarterfinals | (Czech Republic) Petra Kvitová [2] | (Italy) Sara Errani | 6–4, 6–4 |
| Women's Singles Quarterfinals | (Russia) Maria Sharapova [4] | (Russia) Ekaterina Makarova | 6–2, 6–3 |
| Men's Singles Quarterfinals | (United Kingdom) Andy Murray [4] | (Japan) Kei Nishikori [24] | 6–3, 6–3, 6–1 |
| Men's Singles Quarterfinals | (Serbia) Novak Djokovic [1] | (Spain) David Ferrer [5] | 6–4, 7–6^{(7–4)}, 6–1 |
| Mixed's Doubles Quarterfinals | (India) Sania Mirza [6] (India) Mahesh Bhupathi [6] | (United States) Liezel Huber (United Kingdom) Colin Fleming | 7–6^{(7–5)}, 6–2 |
Matches on Margaret Court Arena
| Event | Winner | Loser | Score |
| Men's Doubles Quarterfinals | (Belarus) Max Mirnyi [2] (Canada) Daniel Nestor [2] | (Mexico) Santiago González [12] (Germany) Christopher Kas [12] | 6–1, 6–7^{(4–7)}, 6–2 |
| Men's Doubles Quarterfinals | (India) Leander Paes (Czech Republic) Radek Štěpánek | (United States) Eric Butorac [10] (Brazil) Bruno Soares [10] | 6–4, 7–6^{(7–4)} |
| Women's Doubles Semifinals | (Russia) Svetlana Kuznetsova (Russia) Vera Zvonareva | (India) Sania Mirza [6] (Russia) Elena Vesnina [6] | 7–6^{(7–4)}, 2–6, 6–4 |
| Women's Doubles Semifinals | (Italy) Sara Errani [11] (Italy) Roberta Vinci [11] | (Czech Republic) Andrea Hlaváčková [7] (Czech Republic) Lucie Hradecká [7] | 5–7, 7–5, 6–1 |
| Mixed Doubles 2nd Round | (Australia) Jarmila Gajdošová (Brazil) Bruno Soares | (United States) Abigail Spears (Poland) Mariusz Fyrstenberg | 6–3, 6–2 |
| Mixed Doubles Quarterfinals | (Italy) Roberta Vinci (Italy) Daniele Bracciali | (Czech Republic) Andrea Hlaváčková [7] (Pakistan) Aisam-ul-Haq Qureshi[7] | 6–1, 7–5 |
Coloured background indicates a night match

== Day 11 (26 January) ==
- Seeds out:
  - Men's Singles: (Switzerland) Roger Federer [3]
  - Women's Singles: (Czech Republic) Petra Kvitová [2], (Belgium) Kim Clijsters [11]
  - Men's Doubles: (Belarus) Max Mirnyi / (Canada) Daniel Nestor [2], (Sweden) Robert Lindstedt / (Romania) Horia Tecău [7]
  - Mixed Doubles: (United States) Lisa Raymond / (India) Rohan Bopanna [4]
- Schedule of Play

Matches on main courts
Matches on Rod Laver Arena
| Event | Winner | Loser | Score |
|---|---|---|---|
| Men's Doubles Semifinals | (United States) Bob Bryan [1] (United States) Mike Bryan [1] | (Sweden) Robert Lindstedt [7] (Romania) Horia Tecău [7] | 4–6, 6–3, 7–6^{(7–5)} |
| Women's Singles Semifinals | (Belarus) Victoria Azarenka [3] | (Belgium) Kim Clijsters [11] | 6–4, 1–6, 6–3 |
| Women's Singles Semifinals | (Russia) Maria Sharapova [4] | (Czech Republic) Petra Kvitová [2] | 6–2, 3–6, 6–4 |
| Men's Singles Semifinals | (Spain) Rafael Nadal [2] | (Switzerland) Roger Federer [3] | 6–7^{(5–7)}, 6–2, 7–6^{(7–5)}, 6–4 |
| Exhibition Doubles Semifinals | (Switzerland) Martina Hingis (Australia) Pat Cash | (United States) Martina Navratilova (Croatia) Goran Ivanišević | 9–8^{(7–4)} |
Matches on Margaret Court Arena
| Event | Winner | Loser | Score |
| Junior Boys' Singles Quarterfinals | (Australia) Luke Saville [1] | (United Kingdom) Kyle Edmund [7] | 7–5, 7–5 |
| Men's Doubles Semifinals | (India) Leander Paes (Czech Republic) Radek Štěpánek | (Belarus) Max Mirnyi [2] (Canada) Daniel Nestor [2] | 2–6, 6–4, 6–4 |
| Legends' Doubles | (Australia) Pat Cash (Croatia) Goran Ivanišević | (Netherlands) Jacco Eltingh (Netherlands) Paul Haarhuis | 2–6, 6–4, [10–8] |
| Mixed Doubles Quarterfinals | (United States) Bethanie Mattek-Sands [8] (Romania) Horia Tecău [8] | (Australia) Jarmila Gajdošová (Brazil) Bruno Soares | 4–6, 6–1, [13–11] |
| Mixed Doubles Quarterfinals | (Russia) Elena Vesnina [5] (India) Leander Paes [5] | (United States) Lisa Raymond [4] (India) Rohan Bopanna [4] | 6–2, 6–2 |
Coloured background indicates a night match

== Day 12 (27 January) ==
- Seeds out:
  - Men's Singles: (United Kingdom) Andy Murray [4]
  - Women's Doubles: (Italy) Sara Errani / (Italy) Roberta Vinci [11]
  - Mixed Doubles: (India) Sania Mirza / (India) Mahesh Bhupathi [6]
- Schedule of Play

Matches on main courts
Matches on Rod Laver Arena
| Event | Winner | Loser | Score |
|---|---|---|---|
| Mixed Doubles Semifinals | (United States) Bethanie Mattek-Sands [8] (Romania) Horia Tecău [8] | (India) Sania Mirza [6] (India) Mahesh Bhupathi [6] | 6–3, 6–3 |
| Women's Doubles Final | (Russia) Svetlana Kuznetsova (Russia) Vera Zvonareva | (Italy) Sara Errani [11] (Italy) Roberta Vinci [11] | 5–7, 6–4, 6–3 |
| Men's Singles Semifinals | (Serbia) Novak Djokovic [1] | (United Kingdom) Andy Murray [4] | 6–3, 3–6, 6–7^{(4–7)}, 6–1, 7–5 |
Coloured background indicates a night match

== Day 13 (28 January) ==
- Seeds out:
  - Women's Singles: (Russia) Maria Sharapova [4]
  - Men's Doubles: (United States) Bob Bryan / (United States) Mike Bryan [1]
- Schedule of Play

Matches on main courts
Matches on Rod Laver Arena
| Event | Winner | Loser | Score |
|---|---|---|---|
| Girls' Singles Final | (United States) Taylor Townsend [14] | (Russia) Yulia Putintseva [4] | 6–1, 3–6, 6–3 |
| Boys' Singles Final | (Australia) Luke Saville [1] | (Canada) Filip Peliwo | 6–3, 5–7, 6–4 |
| Women's Singles Final | (Belarus) Victoria Azarenka [3] | (Russia) Maria Sharapova [4] | 6–3, 6–0 |
| Men's Doubles Final | (India) Leander Paes (Czech Republic) Radek Štěpánek | (United States) Bob Bryan [1] (United States) Mike Bryan [1] | 7–6^{(7–1)}, 6–2 |
Coloured background indicates a night match

== Day 14 (29 January) ==
- Seeds out:
  - Men's Singles: (Spain) Rafael Nadal [2]
  - Mixed Doubles: (Russia) Elena Vesnina / (India) Leander Paes [5]
- Schedule of Play

Matches on main courts
Matches on Rod Laver Arena
| Event | Winner | Loser | Score |
|---|---|---|---|
| Mixed Doubles Final | (United States) Bethanie Mattek-Sands [8] (Romania) Horia Tecău [8] | (Russia) Elena Vesnina [5] (India) Leander Paes [5] | 6–3, 5–7, [10–3] |
| Men's Singles Final | (Serbia) Novak Djokovic [1] | (Spain) Rafael Nadal [2] | 5–7, 6–4, 6–2, 6–7^{(5–7)}, 7–5 |
Coloured background indicates a night match
