= Angel (Lizzy McAlpine album) =

Studio album by Lizzy McAlpine
- Released: September 18, 2026
- Recorded: 2024–2026
- Length: 60:23
- Label: RCA
- Producers: Taylor Mackall; Lizzy McAlpine; Mason Stoops

Lizzy McAlpine chronology
Older (2024)	Angel (2026)

Singles from Angel
- 1. "The Light in the Painting" Released: July 23, 2026; 2. "Ugly Things" Released: August 21, 2026

Angel is the fourth studio album by the American singer-songwriter Lizzy McAlpine. It was released on September 18, 2026, through RCA Records. The album consists of 14 tracks.

== Background ==
Following the release of Older in April 2024, McAlpine continued writing and recording songs while touring for the album. From March 2025 to June 2026, McAlpine made her Broadway debut as Nellie Collins in Floyd Collins. She appeared in an episode of School Spirits, and made her feature film debut in Only What We Carry, which premiered at the 2026 Tribeca Festival in New York City. On January 30, 2026, she released a cover of "The House of the Rising Sun" as a standalone single.

== Composition ==
The album was described as "a clear sonic expansion" for McAlpine, with influences drawing from "classic" and "contemporary inspirations, from '70s Laurel Canyon folk to rich 21st-century indie". Undergoing "profound self-discovery", Angel chronicles McAlpine's "return to self through the themes of love, heartbreak and the endurance of community and friendship". "The Light in the Painting" was the first song McAlpine wrote for the album in May 2024 while backstage at a tour stop in San Francisco during The Older Tour. She described the track as the "perfect introduction to the world we've built for Angel".

== Recording ==
On Angel, McAlpine reunited with Older collaborators Mason Stoops and Taylor Mackall in Los Angeles to record the album over the course of two years.

== Album artwork ==
The album cover for Angel was created by artist tidy.totes using paint and chalk. It is McAlpine's first album cover to not feature her likeness.

== Release and promotion ==
McAlpine announced Angel on July 20, 2026, with a release date set for September 18, 2026. "The Light in the Painting" was released as the first single on July 23, 2026. The music video for "The Light in the Painting" was directed by McAlpine and Neema Sadeghi. The second single, "Ugly Things", was announced on August 17, 2026, and was released on August 21, 2026. The full tracklist was announced on September 1, 2026.

== Reception ==
Professional ratings
Aggregate scores
Source	Rating
Metacritic	81/100
Review scores
Source	Rating
AllMusic	4.5/5 stars
Clash	8/10
Paste	B–
Pitchfork	6.8/10

According to the review aggregator Metacritic, Angel received "universal acclaim" based on a weighted average score of 81 out of 100 from five critic scores.

== Track listing ==
Angel track listing
No.	Title	Writer(s)	Length
1.	"The Light in the Painting"	Lizzy McAlpine	3:44
2.	"Anybody's Fool"	McAlpine	3:49
3.	"A Car Wash and a New Pair of Pants"	McAlpine; Nick Drake	3:55
4.	"I Have a Friend"	McAlpine; Taylor Mackall	4:02
5.	"The Moon"	McAlpine	4:33
6.	"Ugly Things"	McAlpine; Mackall; Mason Stoops	3:29
7.	"Soldier of the Road" (featuring Fleet Foxes)	McAlpine	4:18
8.	"Peach"	McAlpine; Mackall	3:16
9.	"Over Country"	McAlpine; Mackall	5:05
10.	"Two Elevens"	McAlpine	3:55
11.	"Our Strange Ways"	McAlpine	7:23
12.	"Mason's Song"	McAlpine; Mackall; Stoops	5:20
13.	"The Crowd"	McAlpine; Mackall	4:16
14.	"Angel"	McAlpine; Mackall	3:18
Total length:			60:23

== Personnel ==
Credits are adapted from Tidal.

=== Musicians ===
- Lizzy McAlpine – lead vocals (all tracks), acoustic guitar (tracks 1, 3–7, 9–12, 14), background vocals (1, 3, 5–8, 10–12, 14), piano (2–4, 11–13), electric guitar (3, 5, 11), Wurlitzer piano (4), 12-string acoustic guitar (5), Rhodes piano (10), Mellotron (11)
- Mason Stoops – acoustic guitar (1, 3, 5–7, 10, 11), electric guitar (1, 3, 5, 6, 10, 11), harmonica (1, 6, 7, 11, 14), 12-string guitar (1, 9–12, 14), keyboards (2, 10), programming (2, 8), fretless bass (4), bass guitar (5, 7, 10, 14), 12-string acoustic guitar (5, 11), baritone guitar (6, 14), fretless guitar (7, 10), dulcimer (7), percussion (8, 10, 11), sound effects (8, 11); banjo, background vocals, Mellotron (12); piano (14)
- Taylor Mackall – bass guitar (1–3, 5–8, 10–12, 14), piano (1, 3, 5, 9, 11, 12, 14), pump organ (1, 7, 10), Mellotron (3, 5–7), melodica (3), Rhodes piano (4), Wurlitzer piano (5, 6, 8), Moog (6), ukulele (7, 11), background vocals (7, 12), percussion (8, 10), synthesizer (8, 11), vibraphone (10)
- Remy Morritt – drums (1, 3, 11, 14), percussion (1, 5, 8, 11, 14), bongos (3), background vocals (11)
- Jay Bellerose – percussion (1, 7), drums (7, 8)
- Abe Rounds – percussion (3, 5, 10, 11)
- Kaveh Rastegar – upright bass (3, 11)
- Omar Akrouche – whistles (4), background vocals (12)
- Sam KS – percussion (5, 6), acoustic guitar (5), cymbals (6)
- Sebastian Steinberg – upright bass (5)
- Ted Poor – bass drum, drums, vibraphone (6)
- Leah Metzler – cello (6, 8, 11)
- Kiara Ana – viola (6, 8, 11)
- Michelle Shin – violin (6, 8, 11)
- Molly Rogers – violin (6, 8, 11)
- Robin Pecknold – acoustic guitar, background vocals (7)
- Fleet Foxes – vocals (7)
- Michael Libramento – bass guitar (10, 14), percussion (10)
- Tyler Nuffer – pedal steel guitar (11, 14)
- Sam Gazarian – background vocals (12)
- Vanessa Wheeler – background vocals (12)
- Pino Palladino – bass guitar (12)
- Kane Ritchotte – percussion (12)
- Ryan Richter – lap steel guitar (14)

=== Technical ===
- Lizzy McAlpine – production
- Mason Stoops – production
- Taylor Mackall – production
- Omar Akrouche – engineering (1, 3–14)
- Sam Gazarian – engineering (1, 3, 5–14)
- Jesse Honig – engineering (2)
- Austin Christy – engineering (4)
- Cassidy Turbin – engineering (4, 14)
- Vanessa Wheeler – engineering assistance (1, 3, 5–8, 10–12)
- Will Maclellan – mixing
- Ruairi O'Flaherty – mastering

== Charts ==
Chart performance for Angel
Chart (2026)	Peak position
Australian Albums (ARIA)	10
Canadian Albums (Billboard)	85
Dutch Albums (Album Top 100)	60
Irish Albums (IRMA)	60
New Zealand Albums (RMNZ)	7
Portuguese Streaming Albums (AFP)	181
Scottish Albums (Official Charts)	19
UK Albums (Official Charts)	44
US Billboard 200	17
US Top Rock & Alternative Albums (Billboard)	5

== Release history ==
Release dates and formats
Date	Formats	Labels	Ref.
September 18, 2026	CD; digital download; streaming; LP	RCA	
