= The Light in the Painting =

Single by Lizzy McAlpine

from the album Angel
- Released: July 23, 2026
- Length: 3:44
- Label: Indigo Blue; RCA
- Songwriter: Lizzy McAlpine
- Producers: Lizzy McAlpine; Taylor Mackall; Mason Stoops

Lizzy McAlpine singles chronology
| "House of the Rising Sun" (2026) | "The Light in the Painting" (2026) | "Ugly Things" (2026) |

"The Light in the Painting" (stylized in sentence case) is a song by American singer-songwriter Lizzy McAlpine. It was released on July 23, 2026, as the lead single from her fourth studio album Angel (2026). It was written and produced by McAlpine, with co-production by Taylor Mackall and Mason Stoops. The song is accompanied by a music video directed by McAlpine with Neema Sadeghi.

In tandem with the announcement of the single and album, McAlpine stated that "The Light in the Painting" was the first song composed for the album, written about "the euphoric beginning of a new connection". Consequence writer Paolo Ragusa described the track as a continuation of the sound of McAlpine's previous album Older (2024), with an arrangement that begins in a "minimalist" style, followed by " acoustic guitar, gentle piano, patient drums, and a sense of graceful release floating in."

== Charts ==
Chart performance for "The Light in the Painting"
| Chart (2026) | Peak position |
|---|---|
| New Zealand Hot Singles (RMNZ) | 14 |
| US Hot Rock & Alternative Songs (Billboard) | 43 |
