= Pushing It Down and Praying =

2024 single by Lizzy McAlpine

Single by Lizzy McAlpine

from the album Older (and Wiser)
- Released: September 20, 2024
- Studio: Electric Lady Studios
- Genre: Indie pop; soft rock
- Length: 3:54
- Label: RCA
- Songwriter: Lizzy McAlpine
- Producers: McAlpine; Mason Stoops

Lizzy McAlpine singles chronology
"I Guess" (2024)	"Pushing It Down and Praying" (2024)	"Celebrate Me Home" (2024)

Music video
- "Pushing It Down and Praying" on YouTube

"Pushing It Down and Praying" is a song by American singer Lizzy McAlpine, released on 16 February 2024 as the lead single from Older (and Wiser), the deluxe edition of her third studio album, Older (2024). She wrote the song alongside its producer Mason Stoops.

== Composition ==
"Pushing It Down and Praying" is an indie pop song. It begins as an acoustic track, before suddenly transitioning to a soft rock sound halfway through the song during the second verse, with an electric guitar and beat. Lyrically, Lizzy McAlpine describes her inner conflict of pining for her former partner while being romantically involved with another person. Although she is in a stable relationship with her current partner, she does not share a deep connection with him as she did with her previous one. She yearns for clarity, as her past relationship experiences hinder her enjoyment of her current relationship. In the chorus, McAlpine sings about wanting to feel guilty but finding herself unable to. She eventually suppresses her emotions from her partner.

== Critical reception ==
Clare Gehlich of Melodic wrote that McAlpine "beautifully captures" a "duality of guilt and confusion" in the song. Raniel Santos praised the song's combination of different music styles, commenting "The drums are impactful while leaving space for the harder-sounding electric guitar and sweeter-sounding harmonies to meaningfully clash in the mix."

== Music video ==
The music video was released alongside the song. It was directed by Sweetiepie and Lizzy McAlpine, who is seen standing before an audience. The clip also features an appearance from singer-songwriter Role Model, who performs a dance sequence with her.

== Charts ==
=== Weekly charts ===
Weekly chart performance for "Pushing It Down and Praying"
Chart (2024–2026)	Peak position
Canada (Canadian Hot 100)	83
Ireland (IRMA)	49
New Zealand Hot Singles (RMNZ)	16
UK Singles (Official Charts)	84
US Bubbling Under Hot 100 (Billboard)	5
US Hot Rock & Alternative Songs (Billboard)	11

=== Year-end charts ===
Year-end chart performance for "Pushing It Down and Praying"
Chart (2025)	Position
US Hot Rock & Alternative Songs (Billboard)	64

== Certifications ==
Certifications for "Pushing It Down and Praying"
Region	Certification	Certified units/sales
Canada (Music Canada)	Platinum	80,000^{‡}
New Zealand (RMNZ)	Gold	15,000^{‡}
United Kingdom (BPI)	Silver	200,000^{‡}
United States (RIAA)	Platinum	1,000,000^{‡}
^{‡} Sales+streaming figures based on certification alone.
