= Margaret Court Arena =

Sports stadium Melbourne, Victoria, Australia

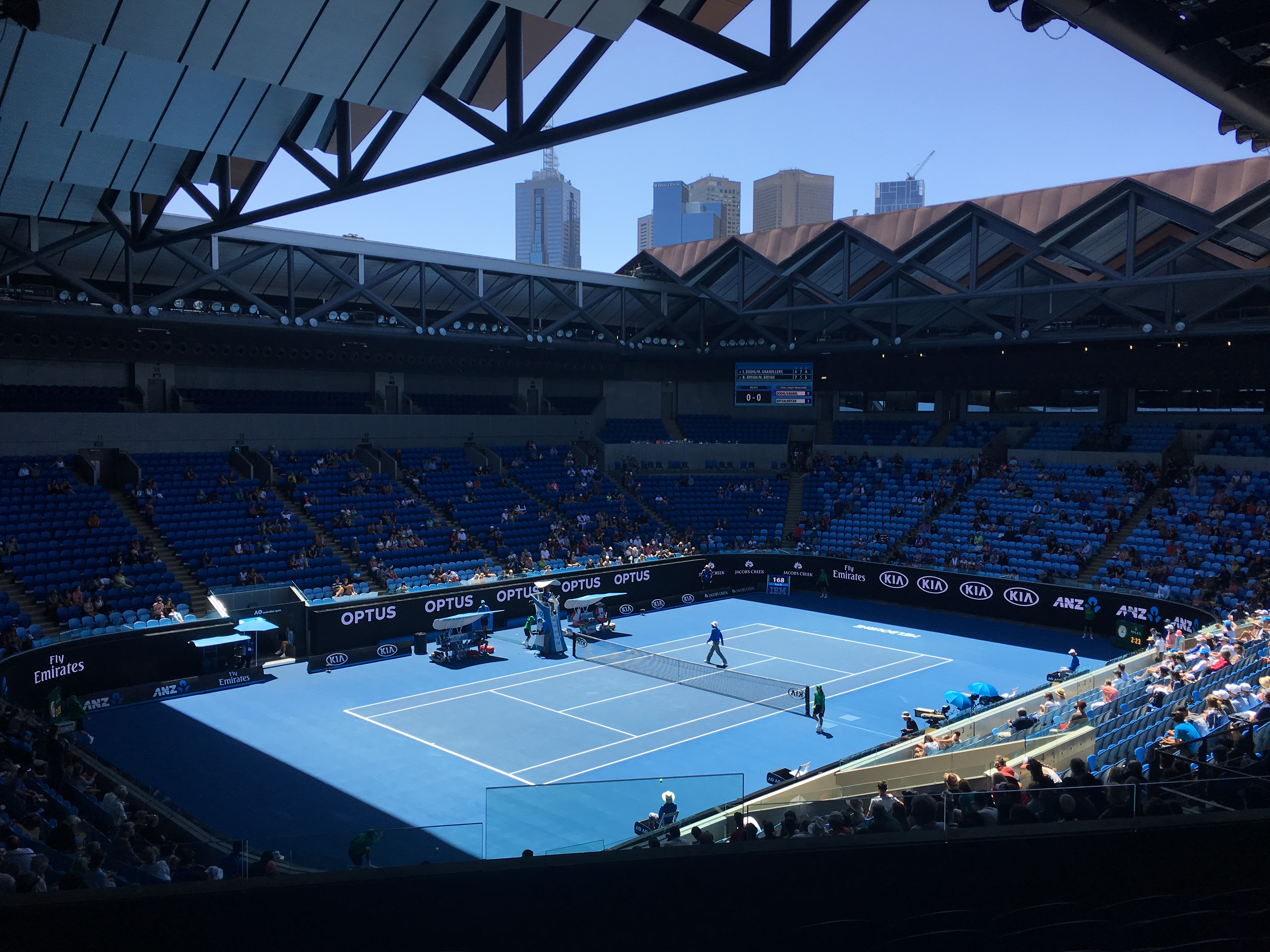
- Arena in use during the 2017 Australian Open
- Interactive map of Margaret Court Arena
- Full name: Margaret Court Arena at Melbourne Park
- Former names: Show Court 1 (1988–2003)
- Address: 200 Batman Avenue; Melbourne Victoria, Australia
- Location: Melbourne Park
- Coordinates: 37.8210°S 144.9777°E
- Owner: Government of Victoria
- Operator: Melbourne and Olympic Park Trust
- Capacity: 7,500
- Surface: GreenSet (Tennis); Hardwood (Basketball / Netball)

Construction
- Groundbreaking: 1987
- Built: 1987
- Opened: 1988
- Renovated: 2014
- Expanded: 2014
- Cost: A$ 180 million (2014 expansion)
- Architects: NH Architecture and Populous

Tenants
- Tennis; Australian Open (1988–present); Davis Cup (Australian national team); Basketball; Melbourne United (NBL) (2014–2015); Netball; Melbourne Vixens (ANZ/SN) (2015–present); Collingwood Magpies (SN) (2017–18)

Website
- Venue Website

Margaret Court Arena is a multi-purpose sports and entertainment venue located in Melbourne Park in Melbourne, Victoria, Australia. The arena, which was built in 1987 and redeveloped in the mid-2010s, has a capacity of 7,500. It is named after Margaret Court.

== History ==
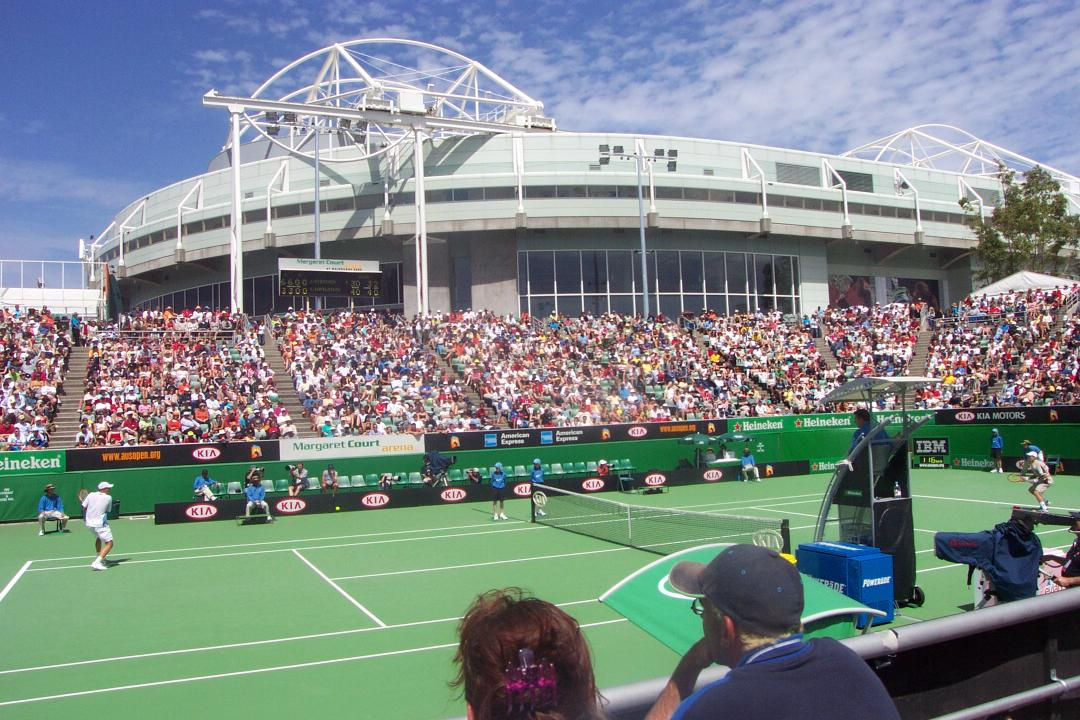
Margaret Court Arena, prior to its redevelopment in 2014

Originally named Show Court One, the venue was opened in 1988, the year the Australian Open tennis championships moved from Kooyong Lawn Tennis Club to Melbourne Park. The show court had a capacity of 6,000 people and was renamed to Margaret Court Arena in early 2003, as a tribute to Australia's most successful female tennis player.

=== Redevelopment ===
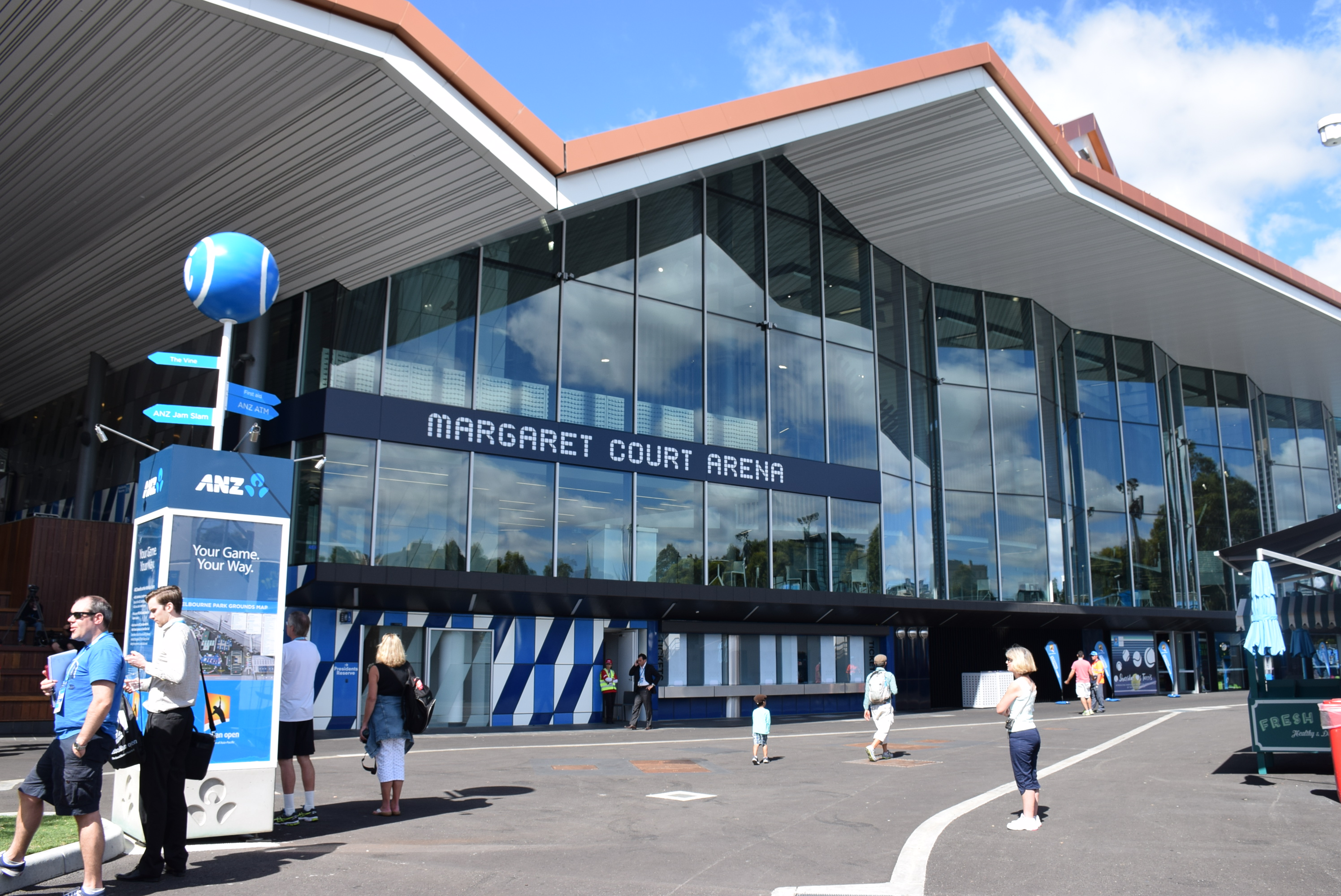
Entrance to Margaret Court Arena

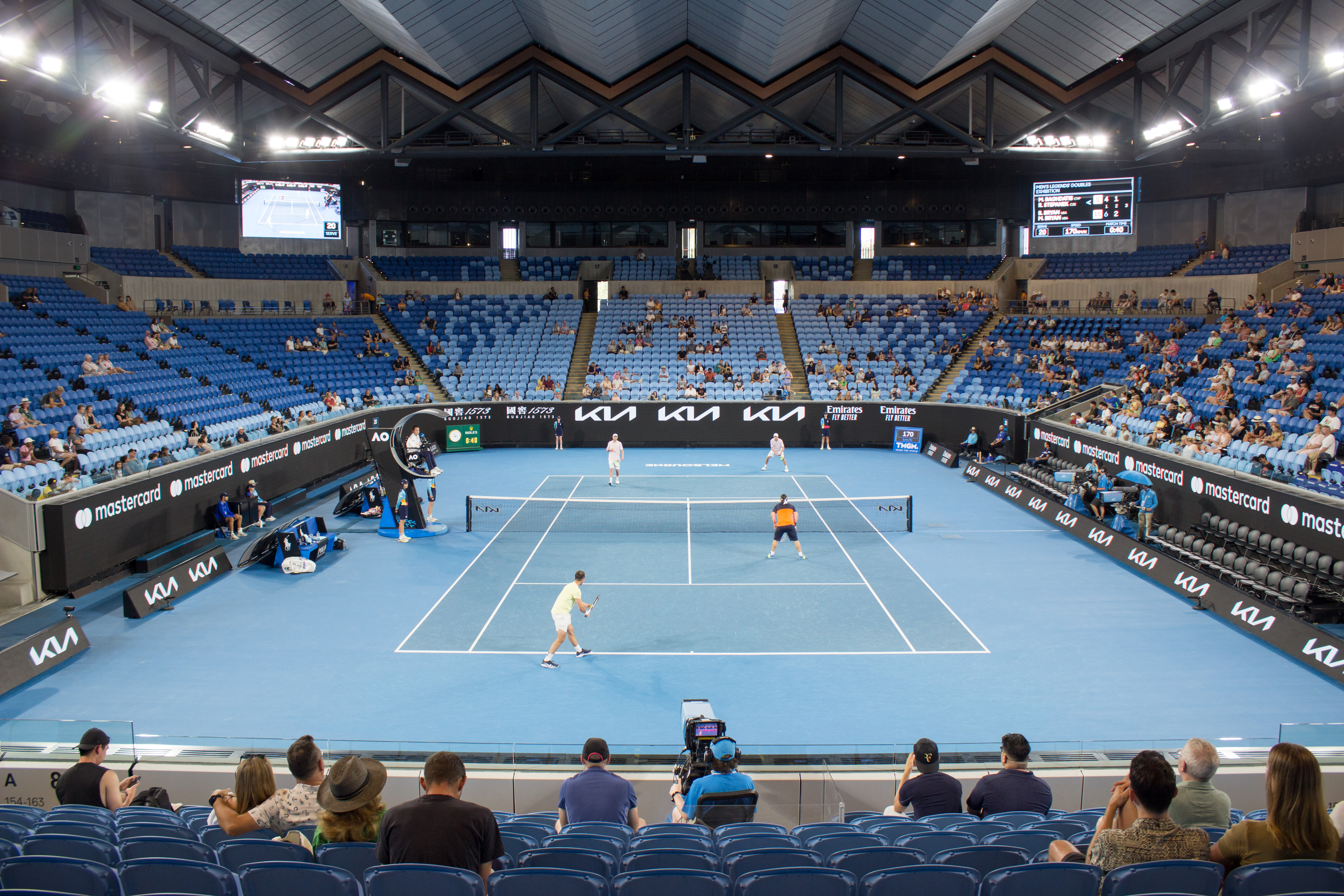
Margaret Court Arena during the 2023 Australian Open

In response to the issue of recurring heatwaves at the Australian Open, as well as a demand for a smaller multi-purpose stadium in the city, the Government of Victoria announced in January 2010 a redevelopment plan for Margaret Court Arena, to occur in tandem with a broader upgrade to the Melbourne Park precinct, at a total cost of $363 million. Lendlease was awarded the contract in October 2011, at which point the government announced the cost of the upgrade to the arena exclusively; $180 million. Construction of the arena began in March 2012 to a design by NH Architecture and Populous.

The redevelopment made the arena the third in the precinct to have a retractable roof and increased the stadium capacity from 6,000 to 7,500 seats. The redevelopment was completed in January 2015, prior to that month's Australian Open. The arena is the third largest capacity venue at the Australian Open tournament, behind the 15,000 capacity Rod Laver Arena (centre court) and the 10,500 seat John Cain Arena.

== Sports and events ==
The arena has hosted tennis matches at the Australian Open every year since 1988. Since the redevelopment in 2014, the arena has increasingly been used for sports such as basketball and netball, as well as music concerts.

Professional netball club the Melbourne Vixens and defunct team the Collingwood Magpies have played some home matches at Margaret Court Arena, typically when the adjacent John Cain Arena is unavailable. The Vixens announced their intention to move home games to the venue in March 2013, stating that the "redeveloped venue is going to be fantastic for us for at least the next five years." In netball mode, the venue can be configured to hold either 5000 people in its bottom tier or 7500 when both sections are open. The Australia national netball team have also hosted test matches at the venue.

National Basketball League club Melbourne United has played some of its home matches at Margaret Court Arena. The club announced it had signed a "multi-year deal" in August 2014 to split 12 of its 14 home matches at Margaret Court Arena and Melbourne Arena. United played its first home game at the arena on 12 November 2014, defeating the Cairns Taipans 91–76 before a crowd of 3,393 fans. The club later shifted all home matches to John Cain Arena.

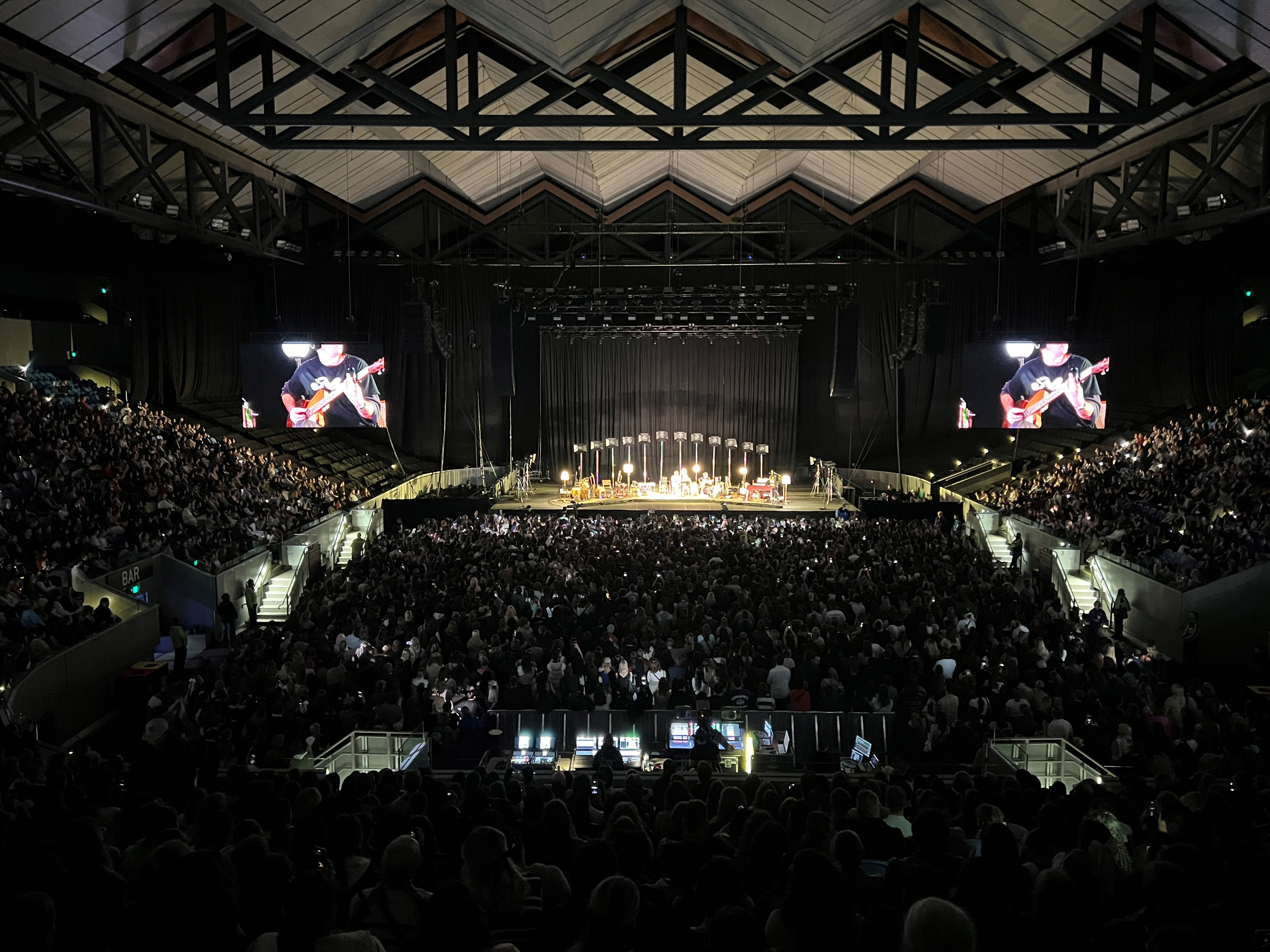
Arena in concert configuration during Lizzy McAlpine's The Older Tour in July 2024

In addition to being able to host various sporting events, Margaret Court Arena also hosts a number of concerts, ensuring Melbourne has a third indoor entertainment venue, all of which are located within Melbourne Park and feature retractable roofing. The arena has played host to artists such as Bob Dylan, Cloud Control, The Black Keys, Delta Goodrem, Demi Lovato, Hilltop Hoods, Kraftwerk, LCD Soundsystem, Macklemore & Ryan Lewis, Selena Gomez, Imagine Dragons, 5 Seconds of Summer, Angus & Julia Stone, Little Mix, The B-52s, ATEEZ, Aurora, Camila Cabello and many more. The venue has a capacity of 6,500 for concerts though has the flexibility to downsize for smaller events.

== Naming controversy ==
The name of the arena, which recognises one of the most successful female tennis players, Margaret Court, has attracted debate due to Court's views regarding LGBT issues. In May 2017, an open letter by Court was published in The West Australian, addressed to the board of Qantas and its then CEO Alan Joyce. In it, Court declared her intention to boycott the airline (where possible) over it having "become an active promoter for same-sex marriage." Joyce has advocated for same-sex marriage, writing that "[s]ame-sex marriage isn't a niche issue. It's about basic rights and equality – the 'fair go' that's such a fundamental Australian value." Court has been a critic of homosexuality and gender identity for several decades and is quoted as saying that the presence of "LGBT in the schools, it's the devil, it's not of God". Various campaigns have been instigated to change the name of the arena. Whilst some former tennis players such as Martina Navratilova and John McEnroe have staged on-court protests over the name of the arena, other public figures such as former Prime Minister Malcolm Turnbull have opposed these efforts on the basis that the arena "celebrates Margaret Court the tennis player" and not her personal beliefs. Venue management has previously stated that it does not support Court's comments and "embrace[s] equality, diversity and inclusion".

== Awards ==
- Public Architecture Award (Alterations and Additions) — 2015 Australian Institute of Architecture Victorian Awards

== See also ==
- List of sports venues named after individuals
- List of tennis stadiums by capacity
- List of indoor arenas in Australia
