= Older (Lizzy McAlpine album) =

2024 studio album by Lizzy McAlpine

- Standard edition cover

Studio album by Lizzy McAlpine
- Released: April 5, 2024
- Studio: Nuffer Ranch (Pasadena)
- Genres: Indie folk; chamber pop
- Length: 45:34
- Label: RCA
- Producers: Lizzy McAlpine; Mason Stoops; Ryan Lerman; Jeremy Most; Tony Berg

Lizzy McAlpine chronology
Five Seconds Flat (2022)	Older (2024)	Angel (2026)

Singles from Older
- 1. "Older" Released: February 13, 2024; 2. "I Guess" Released: March 13, 2024

Older is the third studio album and major-label debut by American singer-songwriter Lizzy McAlpine, released on April 5, 2024, by RCA Records. It serves as the follow-up to her previous album, Five Seconds Flat (2022). McAlpine wrote and produced Older in Los Angeles with Mason Stoops, Ryan Lerman, Jeremy Most, Tony Berg, Taylor Mackall, and Ethan Gruska.

The album centers on relationships, heartbreak, and self-acceptance. Older is primarily an Indie folk and chamber pop record, with elements of baroque pop. The album was preceded by the release of two singles: the title track on February 13, and "I Guess" on March 13; the former was promoted with a televised appearance on The Tonight Show Starring Jimmy Fallon. In support of Older, the singer embarked on The Older Tour in 2024, visiting North America and Europe.

Upon release, Older was met with positive reviews from music critics, with praise towards McAlpine's greater maturity and artistic growth. It debuted and peaked at number 93 on the US Billboard 200, while also charting moderately on the main charts in Australia, Flanders, Ireland, and New Zealand. A deluxe edition of the album, titled Older (and Wiser), was released on October 4, 2024.

== Background ==
Lizzy McAlpine achieved critical and commercial success with her second studio album titled Five Seconds Flat, released on April 8, 2022. In 2023, it marked her first appearance on the U.S. Billboard 200, after the non-single "Ceilings" went viral on the video-sharing service TikTok. The song became McAlpine's first entry on the U.S. Billboard Hot 100 chart, debuting at number 75 and later reaching number 54. It eventually peaked within the top 10 in the United Kingdom. Following its success, McAlpine made her debut televised performance on The Tonight Show Starring Jimmy Fallon and signed a music contract with RCA Records. In the same year, the singer collaborated with American singer Noah Kahan and Irish singer Niall Horan, and "burst onto" the indie scene.

McAlpine embarked on two concert tours to promote her music. Explaining that her relationship with her songs are "a cycle that begins with her liking them before growing bored of [them]", according to the singer, the second tour was "hard" to do. While she tried to figure out who she wanted to be as an artist, McAlpine started working on her next record. On February 13, 2024, McAlpine announced her major-label debut, Older, set for release on April 5. In a statement, McAlpine explained that "through the long and mostly tumultuous journey of making [the album], I have learned who I am as a person, who I want to be as an artist and what kind of art I want to make. This album is a culmination of that growth, showcasing the rawest and most honest version of me." She continued saying that the goal of the project is to "strip away everything and find what sounded like [her]". The album cover for Older was photographed by Michael Hanano.

== Recording and writing ==
The writing and recording of Older took place over the course of three years. McAlpine began writing songs for Older during the recording sessions for Five Seconds Flat in 2021. McAlpine started writing Older's songs when she was in a relationship, and "things changed" through the record's conception. She "channelled the whirlwind of a past relationship" as inspiration. "Like It Tends to Do" was the first song written for the album.

The album was primarily recorded in Nuffer Ranch in Pasadena and produced by Mason Stoops, with additional production by Ryan Lerman of Scary Pockets, Jeremy Most, and Tony Berg. It was largely recorded live with microphones tracking of the entire band at once. McAlpine had begun recording Older with various producers in a trial-and-error manner with the album nearing completion by August 2023. However, the album's sound did not feel right for McAlpine. In August 2023, McAlpine attended a Ryan Beatty concert in Los Angeles and became captivated by the cohesion of his backing band. In October, McAlpine returned to the studio with Beatty's band to re-record almost half of Older. The album's live recording sessions with Beatty's band took place over the course of two weeks. McAlpine confirmed that the tracks on the album were recorded in one or "a couple" takes. This is in contrast to her previous two albums Give Me a Minute and Five Seconds Flat that McAlpine says were "heavily produced and perfected, to the point where I don't even recognize myself in it anymore". The best live takes, consisting of guitars, piano, bass and drums, would be selected from which overdubs would be added. The album's mixing was also approached differently to Five Seconds Flat. Whereas Philip Etherington would be producing and mixing simultaneously as the sessions went along for Five Seconds Flat, mixing for Older was done at the end of the process. During the album's recording before mixing, this made McAlpine think "it's never gonna sound good".

== Music and lyrics ==
The album was conceived as the follow-up to her previous work, Five Seconds Flat (2022). Older predominantly has an indie folk and chamber pop sound, with tendencies towards baroque pop. According to Canadian music and entertainment publisher Exclaim!, each song on the record represents a journey — "from trust to heartbreak, from naive to jaded, from love to loss" — and together they form an album of observations on the world.

The album opens with "The Elevator", a one-minute and 44-second song which captures the experience of falling in love. It includes the backdrop of McAlpine's piano melody, carrying an optimistic lyrical premise. On both "Come Down Soon" and "Like It Tends to Do", McAlpine continues to "muse about [the] pervasive feeling" of thinking she has something to lose. On "Movie Star", which opens with slow guitar picking, she touches on power dynamics in relationships. The fifth track on the album, "All Falls Down", contains string harmonies and feels "wistful and airy". "I Guess", the seventh track, is "a non-love song" with lyrics "filled with equal parts of uncertainty and acceptance".

"Drunk, Running", the first track of the second half of the album, explores how alcoholism can "introduce tension into a relationship" while the next track, titled "Broken Glass", describes emotional violence. The latter and "You Forced Me To" frame accusations in "velvety, lugubrious" arrangements. The previously released title track is a "pared-back" voice-piano-electric guitar ballad, described as "gut-wrenching". It "bleeds nostalgia", reflecting on the ride of "a lost childhood". On "Better Than This", there's "a glimmer of hope but it's built on disconnection and loneliness", as she sings: "What if I'm not a good person? / You always say that I am / But you don't know me at all now". It deals with self-doubt and acceptance. The penultimate song, "March", is a piano-driven ode to McAlpine's father Mark, with reflections on grief, and feelings of love and loss. McAlpine's father died in March 2020 and she had previously written about his death on "Headstones and Land Mines" from her debut album and "chemtrails" from her sophomore album. The closing track, "Vortex", is a resolution to Older's tale, where McAlpine motivates herself "to gain the strength to leave a toxic never-ending relationship". The album was originally to be titled Vortex.

== Release and promotion ==
Older was preceded by the release of two singles. The title track "Older", was announced on February 1 and released on February 13, 2024, as the lead single from the album. It became McAlpine's third entry on the U.S. Hot Rock & Alternative Songs chart published by Billboard, peaking at number 33. On March 27, 2024, McAlpine performed the song live for the first time on The Tonight Show Starring Jimmy Fallon. The music video for "Older" was shot in January 2024 in Mammoth Lakes, California with Neema Sadeghi and Ethan Frank directing but it was shelved, releasing later on November 21, 2025. McAlpine later said that, while rewatching the video, she saw "younger Lizzy really going through it [...] and I felt for her. I'm in such a different place now than I was when we filmed this, and releasing this video felt like the best way to close the chapter".

The second single from the album, titled "I Guess", was released via streaming platforms on March 13, 2024. It reached the number 36 on the same chart.

On September 6, 2024, a one-hour documentary titled Older: The Making of the Album was released on YouTube. It was directed by Neema Sadeghi and chronicles the recording process of Older at the Nuffer Ranch studio in Pasadena, California. The deluxe edition of the album, titled Older (and Wiser), was released on October 4, 2024, with five new tracks. The bonus tracks were recorded at Electric Lady Studios in New York City. It was supported by the release of the single "Pushing It Down and Praying" on September 20; the song was released alongside a music video, which features a special appearance from American singer-songwriter Role Model.

To promote the album, McAlpine embarked on The Older Tour, with dates in Amsterdam, Berlin, Cologne, Paris, London, Manchester, Birmingham, Dublin, and different cities in the United States. It began on April 21, 2024, and ended on October 31.

In November 2025, McAlpine announced a double LP release of Older (and Wiser) for January 16, 2026. It features exclusive live recordings not available on any other release of the album.

== Critical reception ==
Professional ratings
Aggregate scores
Source	Rating
Metacritic	85/100
Review scores
Source	Rating
AllMusic	4.5/5 stars
DIY	4/5 stars
Dork	4/5 stars
Exclaim!	8/10
The Line of Best Fit	8/10
PopMatters	7/10
Sputnikmusic	4.0/5

Upon release, Older received generally positive reviews from music critics, with praise towards McAlpine's greater maturity and artistic growth. According to the review aggregator Metacritic, Older received "universal acclaim" based on a weighted average score of 85 out of 100 from 6 critic scores.

Matt Collar of AllMusic described Older as a "lovely and bittersweet experience", with crafting songs that are "as lyrical and delicately rendered as they are affecting". According to Elise Ryan, writing for the Associated Press, McAlpine navigates "grief and growing older" on Older. In a review for Exclaim!, Aisling Murphy wrote that the album represents McAlpine entering "a new era of her career" following McAlpine's self-admitted ambivalence towards the success of "Ceilings". The critic also predicted that "Vortex" will become "her next catalog-defining anthem".

Matthew Kim of The Line of Best Fit called Older "an ornate exploration of coming-of-age" that can capture a "deeply intimate feel". However, Kim criticized Older's ornate instrumentation as lacking in some regards as it strips back many of the electronic elements on Five Seconds Flat in favor of simpler acoustic guitar and piano compositions. Namely, he criticized the album's title track as being "lyrically interesting but instrumentally lacking". Writing for DIY, Rhian Daly stated that the album's songs "grow and swell with poignant instrumentation, but know exactly when to strip things back to just the singer's voice and a guitar, letting her words shine and deliver an emotional sucker punch to the heart", and that they "prioritise artistry over chasing fame". On the album, BroadwayWorld found McAlpine "stepping into newfound confidence, discovering her voice and defining her artistry with profound simplicity". Melodic Magazine's Clare Gehlich cited "Drunk, Running", "Like It Tends to Do", and "Vortex" as highlights on the album.

== Track listing ==
Older standard edition track listing
No.	Title	Writer(s)	Producer(s)	Length
1.	"The Elevator"	Elizabeth McAlpine; Ryan Lerman	McAlpine; Mason Stoops^{[m]}	1:40
2.	"Come Down Soon"	McAlpine	Stoops; McAlpine^{[m]}; Taylor Mackall^{[m]}	3:44
3.	"Like It Tends to Do"	McAlpine	McAlpine; Stoops; Lerman	3:25
4.	"Movie Star"	McAlpine; Olivia Barton	McAlpine; Stoops; Lerman	1:32
5.	"All Falls Down"	McAlpine	McAlpine; Stoops; Lerman	2:51
6.	"Staying"	McAlpine	McAlpine; Stoops	2:31
7.	"I Guess"	McAlpine; Lerman; Jeremy Most	McAlpine; Stoops; Lerman; Most; Mackall^{[m]}	3:44
8.	"Drunk, Running"	McAlpine; Lerman	McAlpine; Stoops; Lerman	4:05
9.	"Broken Glass"	McAlpine; Lerman	McAlpine; Stoops; Lerman; Tony Berg	3:40
10.	"You Forced Me To"	McAlpine	McAlpine	3:03
11.	"Older"	McAlpine; Mackall; Stoops	McAlpine; Stoops	3:21
12.	"Better Than This"	McAlpine	McAlpine; Stoops	3:34
13.	"March"	McAlpine; Ethan Gruska	McAlpine; Stoops	2:41
14.	"Vortex"	McAlpine	McAlpine; Stoops	5:43
Total length:				45:34

Older (and Wiser) digital edition bonus tracks
No.	Title	Writer(s)	Producer(s)	Length
15.	"Method Acting" (demo)	McAlpine; Gruska	McAlpine; Gruska	3:38
16.	"Pushing It Down and Praying"	McAlpine	McAlpine; Stoops	3:54
17.	"Soccer Practice"	McAlpine; Stoops; Michael Libramento; Remy Morritt; Mackall; Ryan Richter; Tyler Nuffer	McAlpine; Stoops; Morritt^{[m]}	3:58
18.	"Force of Nature"	McAlpine; Stoops; Mackall	Stoops; McAlpine^{[m]}	4:02
19.	"Spring Into Summer"	McAlpine; Stoops; Libramento; Richter; Mackall	McAlpine; Stoops	4:22
20.	"Pushing It Down and Praying" (live from AFAS, Amsterdam)	McAlpine	McAlpine; Stoops	3:59
21.	"Spring Into Summer" (live from MGM Music Hall, Boston)	McAlpine; Stoops; Libramento; Richter; Mackall	McAlpine; Stoops	4:21

Older (and Wiser) physical edition bonus tracks
No.	Title	Writer(s)	Producer(s)	Length
21.	"Soccer Practice" (live from Eventim Apollo, London)	McAlpine; Stoops; Libramento; Morritt; Richter; Mackall; Nuffer	McAlpine; Stoops
22.	"Force of Nature" (live from the Anthem, Washington DC)	McAlpine; Stoops; Mackall	McAlpine; Stoops
23.	"Spring Into Summer" (live from MGM Music Hall, Boston)	McAlpine; Stoops; Libramento; Richter; Mackall	McAlpine; Stoops	4:21

=== Note ===
- ^{^[m]} signifies a miscellaneous producer

== Personnel ==
Credits are adapted from the album's liner notes and Tidal. Track numbers refer to the physical edition of Older (and Wiser).

=== Musicians ===
- Lizzy McAlpine – lead vocals (all tracks), guitar (tracks 2–5, 7, 9, 10, 12), piano (3, 7, 8, 10, 12, 14), organ (3), Mellotron (8), acoustic guitar (15, 16, 18, 19, 23), drums (18)
- Mason Stoops – bass (tracks 1, 7, 8, 11, 14, 19), guitar (2–4, 7, 12, 16–19, 23), background vocals (2, 23), electric guitar (6, 13, 16), acoustic guitar (6, 14, 17), baritone guitar (19)
- Taylor Mackall – piano (tracks 1, 2, 4–7, 11, 13, 14, 17–19, 23), Mellotron (1, 3, 14), synthesizer (6, 18, 19), guitar (2, 17–19), keyboards (2, 7), background vocals (2), organ (8, 23), vibraphone (16, 18)
- Michael Libramento – bass (tracks 1, 6, 7, 13, 14, 16, 19, 23), drums (1); background vocals, guitar (2); acoustic guitar (17, 19)
- Tyler Nuffer – pedal steel guitar (tracks 1, 3, 4, 6, 13, 14, 23); background vocals, guitar (2); steel guitar (17–19), acoustic guitar (19)
- Ryan Richter – steel guitar (tracks 1, 3, 4, 8, 13, 14, 17, 18), guitar (2, 23), background vocals (2), electric guitar (6), acoustic guitar (8, 17, 19)
- Jake Nuffer – guitar (tracks 2, 7), pedal steel guitar (8)
- Ted Poor – drums (track 2)
- Rob Moose – strings (tracks 3, 7–9)
- Ryan Lerman – guitar (tracks 3, 9)
- Sean Hurley – bass (track 5)
- Rob Humphreys – drums (track 5)
- Jon Brion – piano (track 5)
- Jacob Scesney – woodwinds (track 5)
- Sam KS – drums (tracks 6, 9, 13, 14)
- Aaron Sterling – drums (tracks 7, 8)
- CJ Camerieri – French horn (tracks 7, 9); flugelhorn, trumpet (7)
- Jeremy Most – piano (track 7)
- Pino Palladino – bass (tracks 8, 9)
- Matt Chamberlain – drums (track 9)
- Ethan Gruska – acoustic guitar (track 15)
- Remy Morritt – drums (tracks 16, 19, 23), background vocals (23)
- Tiny Habits – background vocals (tracks 16, 19)

=== Technical and visuals ===
- Dave Kutch – mastering
- Andrew Sarlo – mixing (tracks 1–19)
- Will Maclellan – mixing (track 23)
- Jesse Honig – engineering (tracks 1–11, 14, 16–19)
- Greg Koller – engineering (tracks 3–5, 11)
- Lee McMahon – engineering (track 20)
- James Butera – engineering (track 23)
- Lauren Marquez – engineering assistance (tracks 17–20)
- Samuel Burgess-Johnson – packaging design, logo

== Charts ==
Chart performance for Older
Chart (2024–2026)	Peak position
Australian Albums (ARIA)	26
Belgian Albums (Ultratop Flanders)	117
Irish Albums (IRMA)	70
New Zealand Albums (RMNZ)	35
Scottish Albums (Official Charts)	15
UK Albums Sales (OCC)	26
UK Albums Streaming (OCC)	88
UK Americana Albums (Official Charts)	3
US Billboard 200	93
US Top Rock & Alternative Albums (Billboard)	20

== Certifications ==
Certifications for Older
Region	Certification	Certified units/sales
United Kingdom (BPI)	Silver	60,000^{‡}
^{‡} Sales+streaming figures based on certification alone.

== Release history ==
Release dates and format(s) for Older
Region	Date	Format(s)	Edition	Label	Ref.
Various	April 5, 2024	CD; digital download; streaming	Standard	RCA	
Various	June 14, 2024	Vinyl LP	Standard	RCA	
Various	October 4, 2024	Digital download; streaming	Older (and Wiser)	RCA	
Various	January 16, 2026	Vinyl LP	Older (and Wiser)	RCA	
