= Spring Into Summer =

2024 song by Lizzy McAlpine

Song by Lizzy McAlpine

from the album Older (and Wiser)
- Released: October 4, 2024
- Studio: Electric Lady Studios
- Genre: Indie folk; chamber pop
- Length: 4:22
- Label: RCA
- Songwriters: Lizzy McAlpine; Mason Stoops; Michael Libramento; Ryan Richter; Taylor Mackall
- Producers: McAlpine; Stoops

"Spring Into Summer" is a song by American singer Lizzy McAlpine from Older (and Wiser), the deluxe edition of her third studio album, Older (2024). She wrote the song alongside Mason Stoops, Michael Libramento (of Dr. Dog), Ryan Richter and Taylor Mackall and produced it alongside Stoops. The song went viral on the video-sharing app TikTok.

== Charts ==
=== Weekly charts ===
Weekly chart performance for "Spring Into Summer"
Chart (2024–2025)	Peak position
Ireland (IRMA)	44
New Zealand Hot Singles (RMNZ)	31
UK Singles (OCC)	76
US Bubbling Under Hot 100 (Billboard)	15
US Hot Rock & Alternative Songs (Billboard)	18

=== Year-end charts ===
Year-end chart performance for "Spring Into Summer"
Chart (2025)	Position
US Hot Rock & Alternative Songs (Billboard)	37

== Certifications ==
Certifications for "Spring Into Summer"
Region	Certification	Certified units/sales
Canada (Music Canada)	Gold	40,000^{‡}
New Zealand (RMNZ)	Gold	15,000^{‡}
United Kingdom (BPI)	Silver	200,000^{‡}
United States (RIAA)	Gold	500,000^{‡}
^{‡} Sales+streaming figures based on certification alone.
