= Give Me a Minute (album) =

2020 studio album by Lizzy McAlpine

Studio album by Lizzy McAlpine
- Released: August 13, 2020
- Genre: Indie folk; folk-pop
- Length: 43:43
- Label: Harbour Artists & Music
- Producer: Philip Etherington; Dillan Witherow; Ehren Ebbage; Lizzy McAlpine

Lizzy McAlpine chronology
Indigo (2018)	Give Me a Minute (2020)	Five Seconds Flat (2022)

Singles from Give Me a Minute
- 1. "Apple Pie" Released: December 19, 2019; 2. "To the Mountains" Released: March 4, 2020; 3. "Means Something" Released: May 1, 2020; 4. "Pancakes for Dinner" Released: June 1, 2020; 5. "Over-the-Ocean Call" Released: July 13, 2020

Give Me a Minute is the debut studio album by American singer-songwriter Lizzy McAlpine, released independently on August 13, 2020. It was produced by Philip Etherington, McAlpine, Dillan Witherow, and Ehren Ebbage, and preceded by the release of the single "Over-the-Ocean Call" on July 13, 2020.

== Composition ==
Give Me a Minute is an indie folk and folk-pop album, described as "introspective" and "cottagecore-esque", that "explores love lost and found". The songs "To the Mountains", "Means Something", and "Pancakes for Dinner" were highlighted as standouts.

In an interview in 2021, McAlpine stated:

"All the projects that I have put out have been chapters of my life, the Give Me A Minute chapter was a very specific time period. I was going through a breakup and ended up alone, then meeting someone new and was trying to figure out how to do all that. It’s weird because that album doesn’t feel like who I am as an artist anymore which is cool because I can always have it to look back on and reflect. I would describe it as young and naïve because I know so many more things about life now; it feels like I am so much more mature as an artist now."

== Track listing ==
All tracks are written by Elizabeth McAlpine, except where noted.

Give Me a Minute track listing
No.	Title	Writer(s)	Producer(s)	Length
1.	"Give Me a Minute"		Dillan Witherow	2:37
2.	"Nothing / Sad N Stuff"		Philip Etherington; Ehren Ebbage	4:27
3.	"Over-the-Ocean Call (Andrew)"		Etherington	6:10
4.	"I Knew"		Ebbage; Etherington	3:14
5.	"Where Do I Go?"		McAlpine; Etherington; Ebbage	3:26
6.	"To the Mountains"		McAlpine; Etherington	3:13
7.	"You, Love (Interlude)"		Witherow	0:49
8.	"Means Something"		McAlpine; Etherington	2:24
9.	"Same Boat"		Ebbage; Etherington	3:22
10.	"Pancakes for Dinner"		McAlpine; Etherington	3:55
11.	"How Do I Tell You?"	McAlpine; Chris Peters	Etherington; Ebbage	3:06
12.	"Apple Pie"		Etherington	4:19
13.	"Headstones and Land Mines"		Etherington	2:35
Total length:				43:43

== Charts ==
Chart performance for Give Me a Minute
Chart (2025)	Peak position
UK Albums Sales (OCC)	93
UK Independent Albums (OCC)	29
