= Lizzy McAlpine =

American singer-songwriter (born 1999)

- McAlpine in 2026

Background information
- Born: Elizabeth Catherine McAlpine; September 21, 1999 (age 27); Narberth, Pennsylvania, U.S.
- Genres: Folk; indie pop
- Occupations: Singer; songwriter; record producer; actress
- Instruments: Vocals; guitar; piano
- Years active: 2016–present
- Labels: RCA; AWAL
- Website: lizzymcalpine.com

Elizabeth Catherine McAlpine (born September 21, 1999) is an American singer-songwriter, record producer, and actress. Born and raised in the suburbs of Philadelphia, Pennsylvania, McAlpine began gaining recognition by posting original songs and covers online on the platforms SoundCloud and YouTube.

In 2020, she released her debut studio album, Give Me a Minute, to critical acclaim. Her second album, Five Seconds Flat (2022), gave her her first appearance on both the U.S. Billboard 200 and the Billboard Hot 100, with the TikTok-viral single "Ceilings". After signing with RCA Records in 2023, McAlpine released her third studio album, Older, in 2024, which was supported by the lead single of the same name. In October 2024, McAlpine released a deluxe version of the album, Older (and Wiser), featuring five unreleased tracks. Her fourth album, Angel, came out in 2026, with the track "Over Country" going viral on TikTok.

In 2025, McAlpine portrayed Nellie Collins in the Broadway premiere of Floyd Collins opposite Jeremy Jordan.

== Early life ==
McAlpine was born on September 21, 1999, to Mark McAlpine and Robin Lacey and grew up in Narberth, Pennsylvania, in the suburbs of Philadelphia with her sibling, Emory. She has written music since she was in 6th grade. She attended Lower Merion High School, where she sang in a co-ed a cappella group and participated in theatre.

McAlpine studied songwriting at Berklee College of Music in Boston, before leaving in her junior year to pursue music full-time. At the beginning of the COVID-19 pandemic in April 2020 she started the Instagram #BerkleeAtHome streaming concert series.

McAlpine's father died on March 13, 2020. Since his passing, she has vowed to dedicate track 13s to him. She wrote the song "Headstones and Land Mines" about him on her first album, dedicated the song "Chemtrails" to him on her second album, and wrote the song "March" on her third album for him. The tracks reference him as the Earth, the Air, and the Water, respectively. The 13th track of her fourth album, "The crowd", implies that her grief has made her work hard to make him proud.

== Career ==
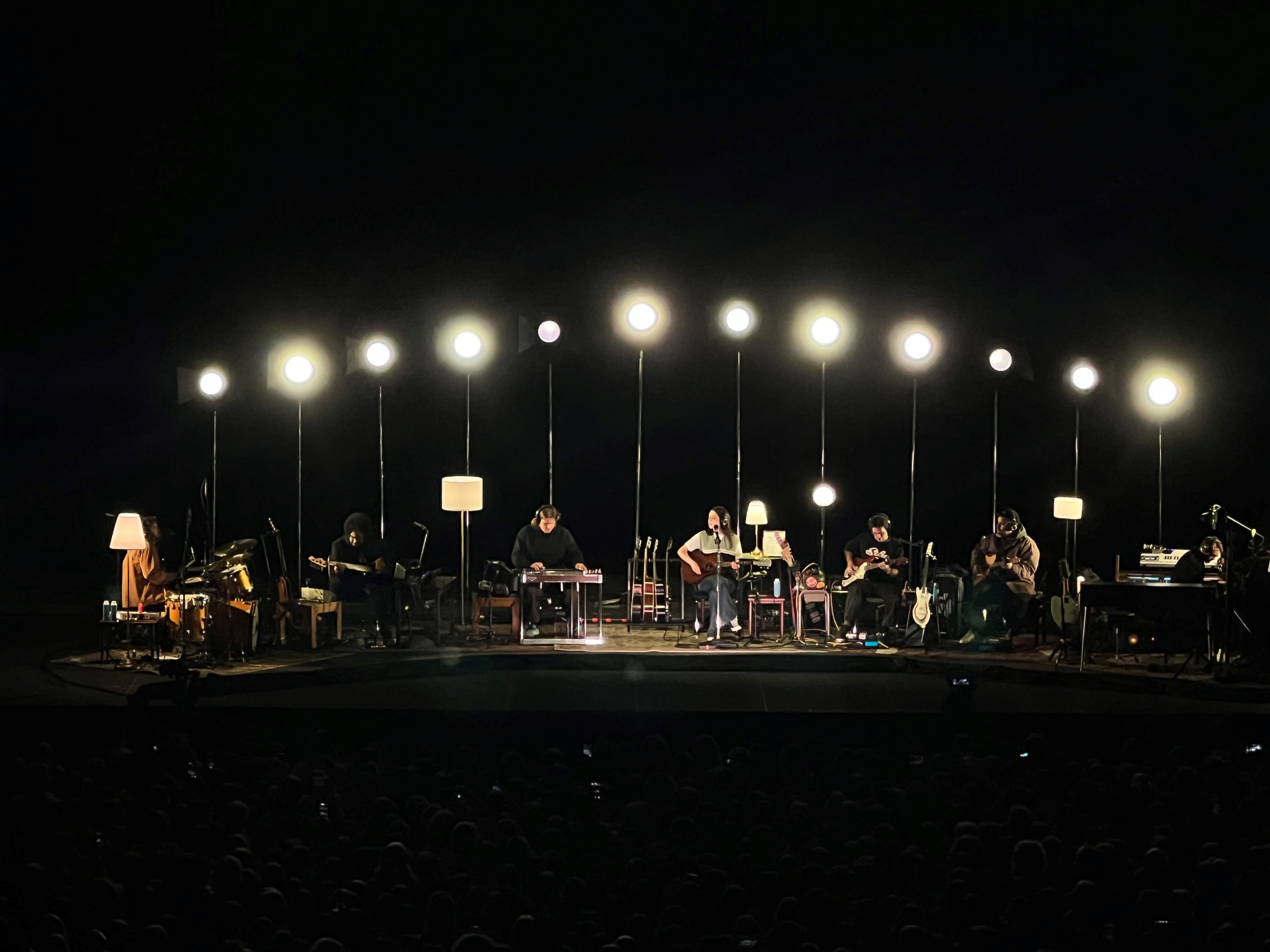
McAlpine performing during The Older Tour in July 2024

In 2018, McAlpine released her debut EP, Indigo, which she later took down, making it unavailable on most streaming platforms other than SoundCloud. She studied abroad in Spain in the fall of 2019, where she wrote her debut studio album, Give Me a Minute, which was released in August 2020. The album has been streamed millions of times on Spotify and other digital service providers. The Dallas Observer named it one of the best albums of 2020, and BBC Media Centre has called her an "up-and-coming vocalist". In April 2021, McAlpine released an 8-song EP, When the World Stopped Moving: The Live EP. She made her late-night debut on November 22, 2021, performing "Erase Me" on Jimmy Kimmel Live!.

McAlpine has garnered supporters from TikTok and Instagram, with several publications calling her a "TikTok star", though she dislikes this epithet. Her unreleased song "You Ruined the 1975", posted in June 2020, has over 10 million views on TikTok as of March 2026.

McAlpine released her second studio album, Five Seconds Flat, on April 8, 2022. The album debuted at number five on US Billboard Heatseekers chart, while also peaking at number nine on Alternative New Artist Albums and number 19 on Top New Artist Albums charts. One song on the album, "Ceilings," went viral on TikTok, making it the most streamed song from the album. "Ceilings" peaked at No. 54 on the Billboard Hot 100, with over 230 million streams.

Following the release of her album, McAlpine announced her debut headline tour in 2022. In November 2022, she performed a set on NPR Music's Tiny Desk Concert with the band Tiny Habits as backing vocalists. NPR listeners ranked her in the top 10 Tiny Desk Concerts of 2022. Her tour started in April 2023 and included 27 shows in several countries. She canceled its UK and Europe dates, citing mental health reasons and burnout.

McAlpine collaborated with American singer-songwriter Noah Kahan and Irish singer-songwriter Niall Horan on the duet versions of the songs "Call Your Mom" and "You Could Start a Cult", respectively. At the beginning of 2024, McAlpine announced the single "Older", released on February 13. The same day, she announced her third studio album of the same name, which represents "who [she] became over the past three years". It was released on April 5, 2024. To promote the project, she embarked on the Older Tour through North America and Europe, which started on April 21 in San Diego, California, and ended on October 31 in Dublin, Ireland. On January 30, 2026, she released a cover of 'The House of the Rising Sun' as a standalone single.

In July 2026, McAlpine announced her fourth studio album, Angel, and released its lead single, "The Light in the Painting". The album was released on September 18, 2026. It was also preceded by its second single, "Ugly Things", announced on August 17, and released on August 21, 2026.

=== Theatre and acting ===
From March to June 2025, McAlpine played Nellie Collins in the original Broadway cast of Floyd Collins at the Vivian Beaumont Theatre opposite Jeremy Jordan. In November 2025, she starred as Susan Hunsecker in Sweet Smell of Success opposite Raul Esparza in concert at Lincoln Center, produced by MasterVoices. On January 27, 2026, it was reported that McAlpine will make her television acting debut in the third season of School Spirits; her songs "doomsday" and "The Elevator" were featured in previous seasons. Milo Manheim advocated for her to have an on-screen role in School Spirits with McAlpine appearing in a flashback scene during the season's third episode.

She will also make her film debut in Only What We Carry.

== Personal life ==
In early 2026, McAlpine began a relationship with musician/producer Kane Ritchotte. They met during a recording session for her album Angel. Ritchotte also plays the love interest in the video for "The Light in the Painting", but McAlpine has said the song is not about him, as all 14 tracks were written before they met.

== Musical style ==
McAlpine has been considered mainly an indie pop and folk singer, while her musical sound has been called bedroom pop and a "blend" of jazz, pop, and contemporary R&B. On her debut album, Give Me a Minute, she focused on folk and folk-pop. Her collaborators include Jacob Collier, Dodie, Tom Rosenthal, Ben Kessler, Noah Kahan, John Mayer, Niall Horan, Finneas, Laura Elliott, and Thomas Headon.

== Discography ==
=== Studio albums ===
Title	Details	Peak chart positions							Certifications
Title	Details	US	AUS	CAN	IRE	NLD	NZ	UK	Certifications
Give Me a Minute	Released: August 13, 2020; Label: Harbour Artists & Music	—	—	—	—	—	—	—	
Five Seconds Flat	Released: April 8, 2022; Label: AWAL	145	—	70	—	38	—	—	BPI: Silver; Recorded Music NZ: Gold
Older	Released: April 5, 2024; Label: RCA	93	26	—	70	—	35	—	BPI: Silver
Angel	Released: September 18, 2026; Label: RCA	17	10	85	60	60	7	44	

=== EPs ===
Title	Details
Nice!	Released: August 31, 2016
Indigo	Released: February 9, 2018
When the World Stopped Moving: The Live EP	Released: April 21, 2021

=== Singles ===
==== As lead artist ====
Title	Year	Peak chart positions										Certifications	Album
Title	Year	US	US Rock	AUS	CAN	IRE	NLD	NZ	SWE	UK	WW	Certifications	Album
"Bang"	2018	—	—	—	—	—	—	—	—	—	—		Non-album singles
"Just Because"	2019	—	—	—	—	—	—	—	—	—	—		Non-album singles
"Oops"	2019	—	—	—	—	—	—	—	—	—	—		Non-album singles
"Apple Pie"	2019	—	—	—	—	—	—	—	—	—	—		Give Me a Minute
"Devil's Hold" (with J.Pappas)	2020	—	—	—	—	—	—	—	—	—	—		Non-album single
"To the Mountains"	2020	—	—	—	—	—	—	—	—	—	—		Give Me a Minute
"7PM" (with Lilacs.)	2020	—	—	—	—	—	—	—	—	—	—		Non-album single
"Means Something"	2020	—	—	—	—	—	—	—	—	—	—		Give Me a Minute
"Pancakes for Dinner"	2020	—	—	—	—	—	—	—	—	—	—		Give Me a Minute
"Over-the-Ocean Call"	2020	—	—	—	—	—	—	—	—	—	—		Give Me a Minute
"False Art" (with Ben Kessler)	2020	—	—	—	—	—	—	—	—	—	—		Non-album singles
"Bored" (with Thomas Headon)	2021	—	—	—	—	—	—	—	—	—	—		Non-album singles
"I Think I" (with Ben Kessler)	2021	—	—	—	—	—	—	—	—	—	—		Non-album singles
"Doomsday"	2021	—	—	—	—	—	—	—	—	—	—	BPI: Silver; RMNZ: Gold	Five Seconds Flat
"Erase Me" (with Jacob Collier)	2021	—	—	—	—	—	—	—	—	—	—		Five Seconds Flat
"All My Ghosts"	2022	—	—	—	—	—	—	—	—	—	—		Five Seconds Flat
"Reckless Driving" (with Ben Kessler)	2022	—	—	—	—	—	—	—	—	—	—		Five Seconds Flat
"Hate to Be Lame" (with Finneas)	2022	—	—	—	—	—	—	—	—	—	—		Five Seconds Flat
"Ceilings"	2023	54	5	19	29	3	34	16	62	6	29	RIAA: Platinum; ARIA: Gold; BPI: 2× Platinum; MC: 3× Platinum; RMNZ: 2× Platinum	Five Seconds Flat
"Call Your Mom" (with Noah Kahan)	2023	— (Note: "Call Your Mom" did not enter the Billboard Hot 100, but peaked at number five on the Bubbling Under Hot 100 chart.)	9	—	68	—	—	— (Note: "Call Your Mom" did not enter the NZ Top 40 Singles Chart, but peaked at number 14 on the NZ Hot Singles Chart.)	—	—	—	RIAA: Gold; ARIA: 2× Platinum; BPI: Platinum; MC: Platinum; RMNZ: Platinum	Stick Season (Forever)
"You Could Start a Cult" (with Niall Horan)	2023	—	—	—	—	—	—	— (Note: "You Could Start a Cult" did not enter the NZ Top 40 Singles Chart, but peaked at number 22 on the NZ Hot Singles Chart.)	—	—	—		The Show: The Encore
"Older"	2024	—	33	—	—	—	—	—	—	—	—		Older
"I Guess"	2024	—	36	—	—	—	—	—	—	—	—		Older
"Pushing It Down and Praying"	2024	— (Note: "Pushing It Down and Praying" did not enter the Billboard Hot 100, but peaked at number five on the Bubbling Under Hot 100 chart.)	11	—	83	49	—	— (Note: "Pushing It Down and Praying" did not enter the NZ Top 40 Singles Chart, but peaked at number 16 on the NZ Hot Singles Chart.)	—	84	—	RIAA: Platinum; BPI: Silver; MC: Platinum; RMNZ: Gold	Older (and Wiser)
"House of the Rising Sun"	2026	—	—	—	—	—	—	— (Note: "House of the Rising Sun" did not enter the NZ Top 40 Singles Chart, but peaked at number 39 on the NZ Hot Singles Chart.)	—	—	—		Non-album single
"The Light in the Painting"	2026	—	43	—	—	—	—	— (Note: "The Light in the Painting" did not enter the NZ Top 40 Singles Chart, but peaked at number 14 on the NZ Hot 40 Singles Chart.)	—	—	—		Angel
"Ugly Things"	2026	—	47	—	—	—	—	— (Note: "Ugly Things" did not enter the NZ Top 40 Singles Chart, but peaked at number 10 on the NZ Hot Singles Chart.)	—	—	—		Angel
"The Wheel"	2026	—	—	—	—	—	—	— (Note: "The Wheel" did not enter the NZ Top 40 Singles Chart, but it peaked at number 16 on the NZ Hot Singles Chart.)	—	—	—		The Hunger Games: Sunrise on the Reaping
"—" denotes a recording that did not chart or was not released in that territory.

==== As featured artist ====
Title	Year	Album
"Never Gonna Be Alone" (Jacob Collier featuring Lizzy McAlpine and John Mayer)	2022	Djesse Vol. 4

=== Other charted songs ===
Title	Year	Peak chart positions						Certifications	Album
Title	Year	US Bub.	US Rock	IRE	NZ Hot	UK	PHL	Certifications	Album
"Staying"	2024	—	26	—	—	—	92		Older
"Drunk, Running"	2024	—	49	—	—	—	—		Older
"Spring Into Summer"	2024	15	18	44	31	76	—	RIAA: Gold; BPI: Silver; MC: Gold; RMNZ: Gold	Older (and Wiser)
"Anybody's Fool"	2026	—	42	—	23	—	—		Angel
"A Car Wash and a New Pair of Pants"	2026	—	46	—	27	—	—		Angel
"I Have a Friend"	2026	—	49	—	29	—	—		Angel
"Over Country"	2026	—	32	—	12	—	—		Angel

=== Guest appearances ===
Year	Title	Collaborator
2019	"Train to Imperia"	J.Pappas
2019	"Next to Me"	CanVas and Avery Shandelman
2019	"Lately I've Been Sad"	Lilacs
2020	"Breathe Out"	Mackenzie Day
2020	"Head Trauma"	nic violets and Brevin Kim
2020	"St. Pancras"	J.Pappas and Jxlen
2020	"Hope" (acoustic)	Tom Rosenthal
2022	"Stayin' Alive"	Scary Pockets

== Filmography ==
=== Film and television ===
Year	Title	Role	Notes
2026	School Spirits	Joyce Ball	Guest appearance; a 1960s beatnik student (Season 3, Episode 3)
2026	Only What We Carry	Jacqueline	

== Concert tours ==
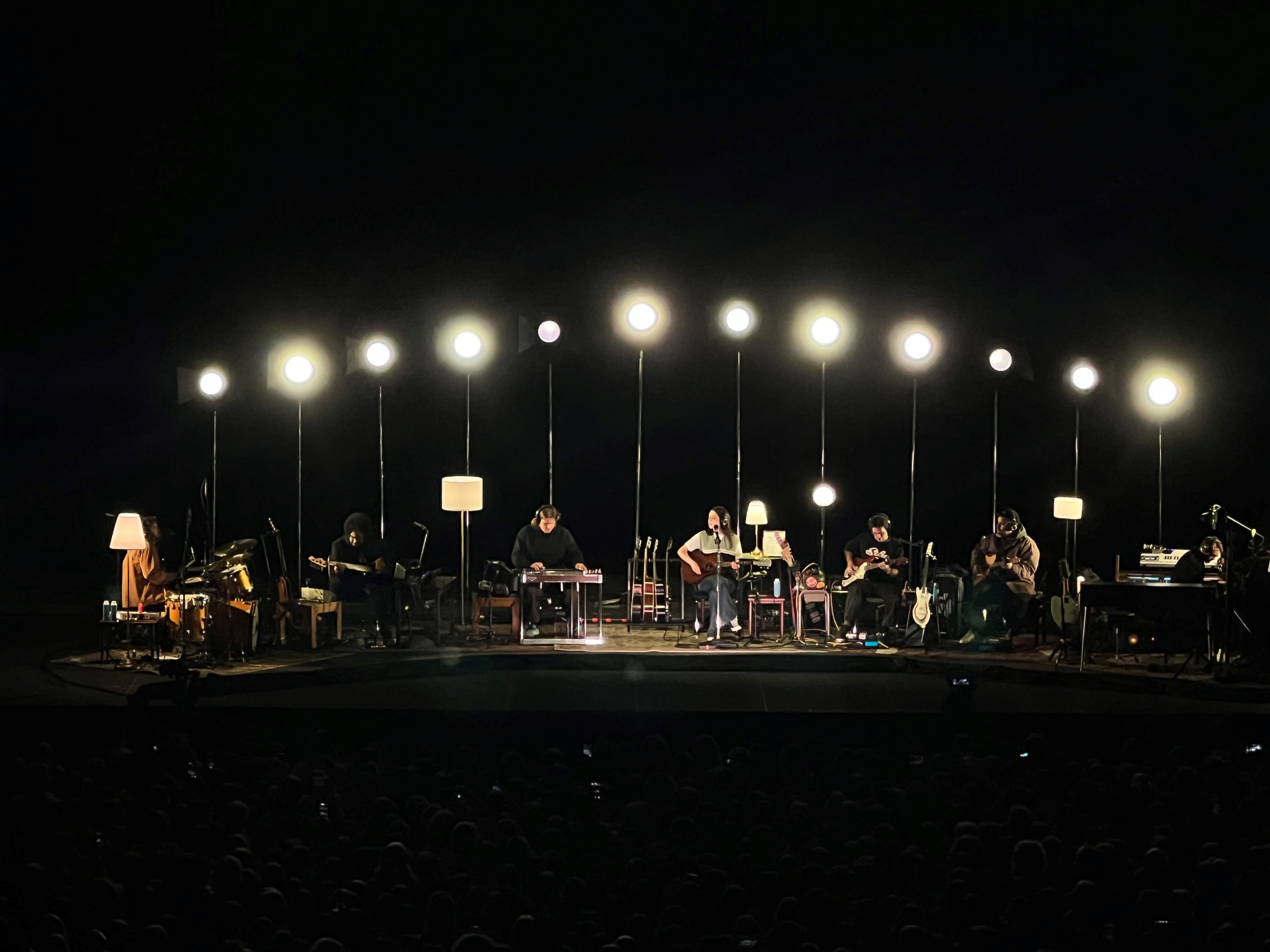
McAlpine seated at center stage during The Older Tour in Melbourne, July 2024

- Five Seconds Flat: The Tour (2022)
- The End of the Movie Tour (2023)
- The Older Tour (2024)
- The Over Country Tour (2027)

== Awards and nominations ==
Award	Year	Recipient(s) and nominee(s)	Category	Result	Ref.
Hollywood Music in Media Awards	2023	Hold On (from Dear Edward)	Best Main Title Theme - TV Show/Limited Series	Nominated	
