= Older (Lizzy McAlpine song) =

2024 song by Lizzy McAlpine

Single by Lizzy McAlpine

from the album Older
- Released: February 13, 2024
- Length: 3:21
- Label: RCA
- Songwriters: Elizabeth McAlpine; Mason Stoops; Taylor Mackall
- Producers: McAlpine; Stoops

Lizzy McAlpine singles chronology
"You Could Start a Cult" (2023)	"Older" (2024)	"I Guess" (2024)

"Older" is a song by American singer-songwriter Lizzy McAlpine and the title track of her third studio album (2024). The song was written by the artist alongside Mason Stoops and Taylor Mackall, while the production was handled by the former two. RCA Records released "Older" on February 13, 2024, as the lead single from the album. It is a stripped-down ballad with lyrics about the feeling of growing up.

== Background and release ==
Via social media, Lizzy McAlpine announced the track along with its release date on February 1, 2024. While releasing the song, she announced the follow-up to 2022's Five Seconds Flat, her third studio album, set for release on April 5. A lyric video for the song was published on February 16.

== Recording and composition ==
"Older" was recorded and produced in Los Angeles with Mason Stoops, and contains additional songwriting by Taylor Mackall. It is a "pared-back" voice-piano-electric guitar ballad, described as "gut-wrenching" and "imbued with symptoms of growth". According to Exclaim!, with the opening lines (Over and over / A carousel ride / Pay for your ticket / Watch the red moon climb), McAlpine recalls Joni Mitchell's "Both Sides, Now".

== Live performances ==
On March 27, 2024, McAlpine performed the song live for the first time on The Tonight Show Starring Jimmy Fallon, backed only by a pianist and guitarist.

== Charts ==
Chart performance for "Older"
Chart (2024)	Peak position
US Hot Rock & Alternative Songs (Billboard)	33
