= I Guess =

2024 single by Lizzy McAlpine

Single by Lizzy McAlpine

from the album Older
- Released: March 13, 2024
- Studio: Nuffer Ranch (Pasadena); East West Studios (Los Angeles)
- Length: 3:44
- Label: RCA
- Songwriters: Elizabeth McAlpine; Jeremy Most; Ryan Lerman
- Producers: Elizabeth McAlpine; Ryan Lerman; Mason Stoops; Jeremy Most

Lizzy McAlpine singles chronology
"Older" (2024)	"I Guess" (2024)	"Pushing It Down and Praying" (2024)

"I Guess" is a song recorded and written by American singer-songwriter Lizzy McAlpine from her third studio album, Older (2024). Jeremy Most and Ryan Lerman also worked on the writing of the song, while producing it along with McAlpine and Mason Stoops. "I Guess" was released on March 13, 2024, as the second single from the album, following the release of the title track exactly one month before.

== Background ==
On February 1, 2024, Lizzy McAlpine announced the release of her first song of the year, "Older", which was released on February 13. On the same day, the artist confirmed the release of her third studio album of the same name, and major-label debut, set for release on April 5, 2024. "I Guess" was announced as the second single from the record on March 8, and was released five days later. The track listing of the album was revealed on March 20 via McAlpine's social media accounts; it contains "I Guess" as the seventh track.

== Production and composition ==
Like majority of the album, "I Guess" was recorded and produced in Los Angeles, alongside Ryan Lerman, Mason Stoops, and Jeremy Most. It is "a non-love song filled with equal parts of uncertainty and acceptance". Upon release, Billboard's critic Jason Lipshutz included "I Guess" in its list of Best New Pop Songs, praising McAlpine's songwriting, and adding that "the widescreen climax at the end will make your heart swell".

== Credits ==
- Lizzy McAlpine – vocals, writing, production, guitar, piano
- Ryan Lerman – writing, production
- Jeremy Most – writing, production, piano
- Mason Stoops – production, guitar
- Taylor Mackall – piano
- Aaron Sterling – drums
- Michael Libramento – bass
- Rob Moose – strings
- CJ Camerieri – French horn, flugelhorn, trumpet
- Andrew Sarlo – mixing
- Dave Kutch – mastering

== Charts ==
Chart performance for "I Guess"
Chart (2024)	Peak position
US Hot Rock & Alternative Songs (Billboard)	36
