= Five Seconds Flat =

Studio album by Lizzy McAlpine
- Released: April 8, 2022
- Recorded: 2021
- Genre: Indie pop
- Length: 45:05
- Labels: Harbour Artists & Music/AWAL
- Producers: Philip Etherington; Ehren Ebbage

Lizzy McAlpine chronology
Give Me a Minute (2020)	Five Seconds Flat (2022)	Older (2024)

Singles from Five Seconds Flat
- 1. "Doomsday" Released: October 27, 2021; 2. "Erase Me" Released: November 17, 2021; 3. "All My Ghosts" Released: January 19, 2022; 4. "Reckless Driving" Released: February 23, 2022; 5. "Hate to Be Lame" Released: April 5, 2022; 6. "Ceilings" Released: March 14, 2023

Five Seconds Flat (stylized in all lowercase) is the second studio album by American singer-songwriter Lizzy McAlpine, released on April 8, 2022, by Harbour Artists & Music in association with the AWAL music distribution company.

== Background and promotion ==
On January 20, 2022, Five Seconds Flat was announced alongside the release of the single "All My Ghosts". The album was released on April 8, 2022.

=== Five Seconds Flat, the Film ===
With the release of the album, McAlpine also released a film on April 8, 2022. The film is available to watch on Lizzy McAlpine's official YouTube channel.

All but two of the album's songs appear in the film. McAlpine came up with the whole idea for the film and the plot by herself. "I had whole pages of complex explanations about the meaning of the film", she said in a questionnaire after the screening of the film. She came up with the idea of the skeletons in the film "because I feel that heartbreak is like a small death".

== Critical reception ==
Professional ratings
Review scores
Source	Rating
AllMusic	4/5 stars
Dork	4/5 stars
The Line of Best Fit	7/10
Sputnikmusic	4.5/5

According to the collection of reviews on Album of the Year, the album received a user score of 80/100 and a critic score of 80/100.

In a 4 out of 5 star review, Dork wrote that "the album is all flashes of clean white sheets, sunlight coming through the blinds, first stirring of your coffee in the morning... Over the course of the album, the 22-year-old finds herself traversing through gut-punching heartbreak: each track feels like another step on tentative feet." The Line of Best Fit praised McAlpine's growth as an artist who "sounds confident and accomplished on her second album" and "showcases her skill as a singer, songwriter and storyteller" with Five Seconds Flat.

According to a review by Dartmouth student Elle Muller, the album "builds upon raw lyricism and extends her storytelling through a longer exploration of heartbreak."

== Track listing ==
All tracks are written by Elizabeth McAlpine, except where noted. All tracks are produced by Philip Etherington and Ehren Ebbage, except where noted.

Five Seconds Flat track listing
No.	Title	Writer(s)	Producer(s)	Length
1.	"Doomsday"			4:28
2.	"An Ego Thing"			2:50
3.	"Erase Me" (featuring Jacob Collier)	McAlpine; Collier; Jordan Rakei	Etherington; Ebbage; Collier^{[a]}	3:34
4.	"Called You Again"			3:12
5.	"All My Ghosts"			3:17
6.	"Reckless Driving" (featuring Ben Kessler)	McAlpine; Kessler; Etherington	Etherington; Ebbage; Kessler^{[c]}; Ryan Lerman^{[c]}	3:09
7.	"Weird" (featuring Laura Elliott)	McAlpine; Martin Luke Brown; Elliott		3:29
8.	"Ceilings"			3:02
9.	"What a Shame"			2:49
10.	"Firearm"			3:02
11.	"Hate to Be Lame" (featuring Finneas)	McAlpine; Finneas O'Connell	Etherington; Ebbage; O'Connell^{[a]}	2:36
12.	"Nobody Likes a Secret"			1:48
13.	"Chemtrails"			3:57
14.	"Orange Show Speedway"			3:46
Total length:				45:05

=== Notes ===
- All track titles are stylized in all lowercase.
- ^{^[a]} signifies an additional producer
- ^{^[c]} signifies a co-producer

== Personnel ==
- Lizzy McAlpine – lead vocals
- Dave Kutch – mastering
- Philip Etherington – mixing
- Rob Shuttleworth – design
- Gus Black – photography

== Five Seconds Flat, the tour ==
Five Seconds Flat, the tour
- Tour by Lizzy McAlpine
- Associated album: Five Seconds Flat
- Start date: June 8, 2022
- End date: November 25, 2022
- Legs: 3
- No. of shows: 36
- Supporting act: Carol Ades

With the release of the album came the tour that was announced on social networks on April 7, 2022, and took place from June 8, 2022, to November 25, 2022. The tour had 26 shows in North America and 10 shows in Europe. In most of the performances during the tour, the opening act was the singer Carol Ades.

== The End of the Movie, the tour ==
Following her first sold-out tour, McAlpine announced a second solo tour on November 7, 2022, on social media. The tour began on April 18, 2023, and concluded on June 11, 2023. The tour had 18 shows in North America and 7 shows in Europe. Her opening act was announced as Olivia Barton.

The End of the Movie, the tour
- Tour by Lizzy McAlpine
- Associated album: Five Seconds Flat
- Start date: April 18, 2023
- End date: June 11, 2023
- Legs: 2
- No. of shows: 25
- Supporting act: Olivia Barton

== Charts ==
Chart performance for Five Seconds Flat
Chart (2022–2023)	Peak position
Canadian Albums (Billboard)	97
Dutch Albums (Album Top 100)	38
US Billboard 200	145

== Certifications ==
Certifications for Five Seconds Flat
Region	Certification	Certified units/sales
New Zealand (RMNZ)	Gold	7,500^{‡}
United Kingdom (BPI)	Silver	60,000^{‡}
^{‡} Sales+streaming figures based on certification alone.
