= Ceilings (song) =

Single by Lizzy McAlpine

from the album Five Seconds Flat
- Released: March 14, 2023
- Genre: Folk-pop
- Length: 3:02
- Label: AWAL
- Songwriter: Lizzy McAlpine
- Producers: Philip Etherington; Ehren Ebbage

Lizzy McAlpine singles chronology
"Hate to Be Lame" (2022)	"Ceilings" (2023)	"Call Your Mom" (2023)

"Ceilings" is a song by American singer-songwriter Lizzy McAlpine. It appeared on her second studio album, Five Seconds Flat, which was released on April 8, 2022. The folk-pop ballad, which has prominent strings in its instrumentation, describes the end of a night with McAlpine's partner that turns out to be a daydream about a relationship that already ended.

"Ceilings" became McAlpine's breakthrough song after becoming popular on TikTok, where a trend of young women running through the rain and snow to the plot twist in the song's final verse soundtracked hundreds of thousands of videos. "Ceilings" peaked at number 54 on the Billboard Hot 100. Outside of the United States, "Ceilings" peaked within the top ten of the charts in Ireland and the United Kingdom. The song was later released to mainstream radio in the United States as a single on March 14, 2023.

== Background, music video, and TikTok success ==
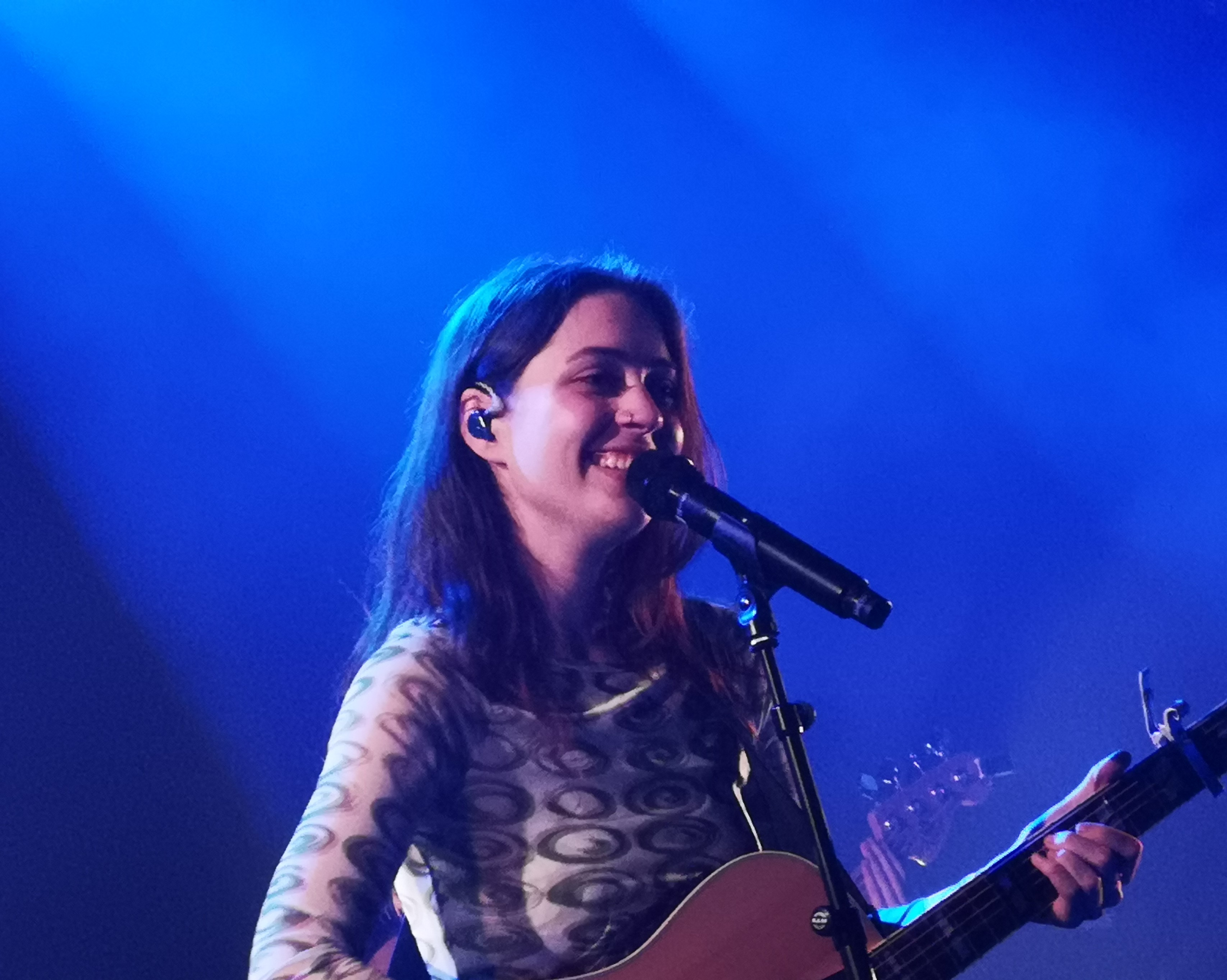
McAlpine in 2022

"Ceilings" was included on Lizzy McAlpine's second studio album Five Seconds Flat, a folk-pop record released on April 8, 2022, on AWAL. A music video starring Michael Hanano, McAlpine's boyfriend at the time, was released on February 14, 2023.

In early 2023, a sped-up version of the song's final verse became popular on TikTok, where it was used in over 200,000 videos, mostly of young women lip-syncing to the song while running through the rain or snow. Its online success led to the song being McAlpine's breakthrough song. She performed the song during her Tiny Desk Concert for NPR Music in November 2022 and on The Tonight Show Starring Jimmy Fallon in March 2023.

== Composition and reception ==
"Ceilings" is a ballad with prominently featured strings. The lyrics of "Ceilings" detail a night with McAlpine's partner that she does not want to end. The song ends with a plot twist that the night was actually a daydream about a relationship that has already ended, as McAlpine sings, "But it's not real/And you don't exist/And I can't recall the last time I was kissed" in the song's final verse. She based the song on a relationship she ended in college, as well as her going to London for three months to forget about it.

"Ceilings" was called "doleful" and "a plot-twisty ballad of heart-stomping hallucinations" by Bobby Olivier of Billboard, while Maggie Mancini of PhillyVoice similarly called it a "heartfelt" and "wistful, sometimes hallucinogenic ballad". Dork's Neive McCarthy praised "Ceilings" as "a particular standout" from the songs on Five Seconds Flat.

== Chart performance ==
"Ceilings" debuted on the Billboard Hot 100 on the chart dated March 4, 2023, becoming McAlpine's first song to enter the chart. It also peaked at number eight on the Hot Rock & Alternative Songs chart.

In the United Kingdom, "Ceilings" peaked at number six on the UK Singles Chart on March 24, 2023 – for the week ending March 30, 2023 – becoming her first top ten song in Britain.

== Cover versions ==
On April 18, 2023, Niall Horan performed a cover of the song whilst appearing on BBC Radio 1's Live Lounge.

== Charts ==
=== Weekly charts ===
Weekly chart performance for "Ceilings"
Chart (2023)	Peak position
Australia (ARIA)	19
Austria (Ö3 Austria Top 40)	63
Canada (Canadian Hot 100)	29
Germany (GfK)	71
Global 200 (Billboard)	29
Iceland (Tónlistinn)	29
Ireland (IRMA)	3
Lithuania (AGATA)	83
Netherlands (Dutch Top 40)	32
Netherlands (Single Top 100)	34
New Zealand (Recorded Music NZ)	16
Norway (VG-lista)	16
Portugal (AFP)	100
Singapore (RIAS)	27
Sweden (Sverigetopplistan)	62
Switzerland (Schweizer Hitparade)	60
UK Singles (Official Charts)	6
UK Indie (Official Charts)	2
US Billboard Hot 100	54
US Adult Pop Airplay (Billboard)	34
US Hot Rock & Alternative Songs (Billboard)	5
US Pop Airplay (Billboard)	27

=== Year-end charts ===
Year-end chart performance for "Ceilings"
Chart (2023)	Position
Australia (ARIA)	92
Canada (Canadian Hot 100)	92
UK Singles (OCC)	35
US Hot Rock & Alternative Songs (Billboard)	13

== Certifications ==
Certifications for "Ceilings"
Region	Certification	Certified units/sales
Australia (ARIA)	Gold	35,000^{‡}
Canada (Music Canada)	3× Platinum	240,000^{‡}
Denmark (IFPI Danmark)	Gold	45,000^{‡}
France (SNEP)	Gold	100,000^{‡}
New Zealand (RMNZ)	2× Platinum	60,000^{‡}
Spain (Promusicae)	Gold	30,000^{‡}
United Kingdom (BPI)	2× Platinum	1,200,000^{‡}
United States (RIAA)	Platinum	1,000,000^{‡}
^{‡} Sales+streaming figures based on certification alone.
