= Who's the Clown? =

Studio album by Audrey Hobert
- Released: August 15, 2025
- Recorded: 2024–2025
- Genres: Pop; alternative pop
- Length: 34:54
- Label: RCA
- Producer: Ricky Gourmet

Singles from Who's the Clown?
- 1. "Sue Me" Released: May 9, 2025; 2. "Bowling Alley" Released: June 20, 2025; 3. "Wet Hair" Released: July 23, 2025; 4. "Thirst Trap" Released: August 15, 2025; 5. "Silver Jubilee" Released: July 2, 2026

Who's the Clown? is the debut studio album by American singer-songwriter Audrey Hobert. It was released on August 15, 2025 through RCA Records.

== Background ==
After graduating from New York University in 2021, Hobert went on to work as a writer's production assistant at Warner Bros. and later served as a staff writer for the Nickelodeon sitcom The Really Loud House. She has been best friends with American singer-songwriter Gracie Abrams since they were in fifth grade. She ventured into songwriting in 2024, co-writing multiple songs on Abrams's second studio album, The Secret of Us, including "That's So True". Hobert made guest appearances throughout the Secret of Us Tour to perform the song with Abrams. In 2025, she co-wrote the songs "Start All Over" with English singer-songwriter Alessi Rose and "Concrete" with her brother, Malcolm Todd.

== Promotion and album artwork ==
Hobert announced her debut single "Sue Me" on April 22, 2025, which was released on May 9. Her second single "Bowling Alley" was released on June 20, 2025. The third single titled "Wet Hair" was released on July 23, 2025. The album was announced the same day. The tracklist was announced on August 7, 2025.

Coinciding with the album's release, "Thirst Trap" became the album's fourth single. On July 2, 2026 "Silver Jubilee" became the album's fifth single.

Hobert revealed that with the album artwork, as she was a brand new upcoming artist, she wanted to grab people's attention with the album cover, and she figured the way to do that was to make it a scary artwork with a clown.

=== Music videos ===
Hobert released five official music videos as companions to the album's singles, as well as the album track "Sex and the City". The music video for lead single, "Sue Me," was released May 9, 2025. The following video for "Bowling Alley" was released June 20, 2025. The next video for "Wet Hair", described as a homemade "vid" was released July 23, 2025. The fourth music video premiere for "Thirst Trap" coincided with the release of the album on August 15, 2025. "Sex and the City" is the only non-single to receive a music video, which premiered December 3, 2025. She then released the music video for “Silver Jubilee” on Friday 7th of August, 2026, leading up to the first anniversary of the album. On October 8, 2026, she released the music video for "Phoebe". She said that the album is a "visual album" on Instagram.

=== Live performances ===
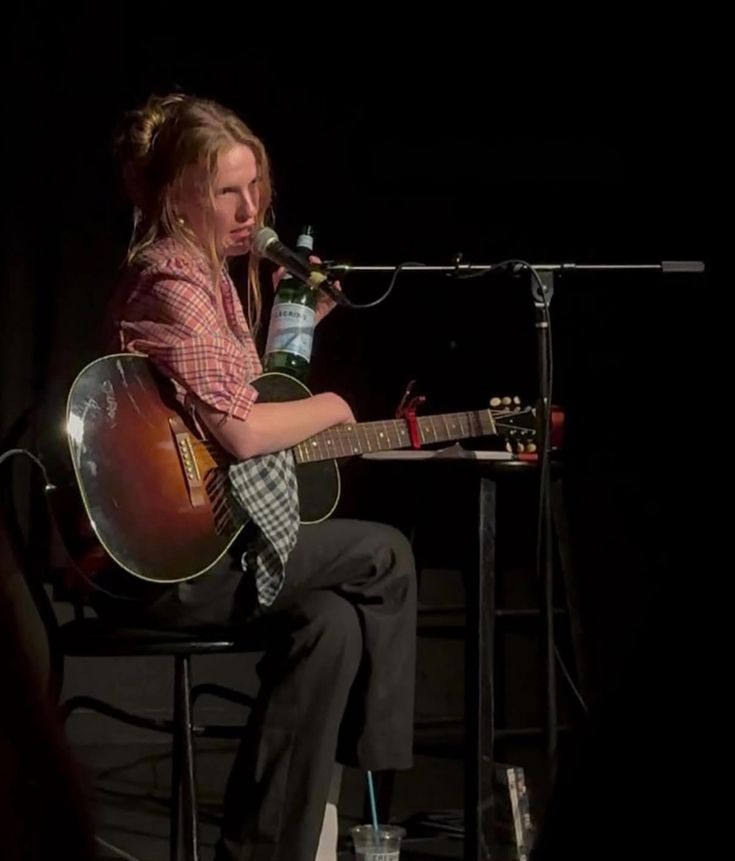
Audrey Hobert Live in LA June 24, 2025

Hobert appeared in several live internet and television performances of tracks from the album as promotion, some of which include for Apple Music, Vevo, and The Tonight Show Starring Jimmy Fallon. On September 15, 2025, Hobert announced "The Staircase to Stardom" tour on her Instagram. The tour began on December 1, 2025 in San Francisco, running until August 12, 2026 in Seattle. More dates were announced January 2026 including two shows in Los Angeles and one at the Paramount Theatre in Seattle.

== Critical reception ==
Who's the Clown? ratings
Review scores
Source	Rating
Clash	8/10
Pitchfork	6.9/10
Rolling Stone	4/5 stars

Eduarda Goulart of Clash claimed Hobert put pop music "in good hands", specifically praising her comedic style and her ability to "[make] the listener feel like a close friend" with her storytelling. However, Goulart also criticized the album for being repetitive, expressing that "[Hobert] benefits from sharing her process with someone, and the lack of clear references and perspective could be settled with the addition of one more producer/co-writer."

John Lonsdale of Rolling Stone similarly praised Hobert as "one of pop's great new voices", adding that her previous experience as a screenwriter made the album "cinematic" with songs that "deserve their own coming-of-age miniseries". Lonsdale also favorably compared tracks like "Chateau" and "Phoebe" to the works of Avril Lavigne, the Chicks, and Taylor Swift.

Arielle Gordon of Pitchfork said the songs on Who's the Clown? fittingly sound like an extension of her work on Abrams’ world, which were verbose, conversational, and unfiltered. However, she claimed the album faltered in its second half, stating Hobert uses specificity as a crutch and struggled to transcend the biographical details of her own life.

=== Accolades ===
Organization	Year	Category	Result	Ref.
IHeartRadio Music Awards	2026	Favorite Debut Album	Nominated	

== Track listing ==
All tracks are produced by Ricky Gourmet.

Who's the Clown? track listing
No.	Title	Writer(s)	Length
1.	"I Like to Touch People"	Audrey Hobert	2:04
2.	"Sue Me"	Hobert; Matthew Fildey	2:50
3.	"Drive"	Hobert; Fildey	2:16
4.	"Wet Hair"	Hobert	3:07
5.	"Bowling Alley"	Hobert	2:34
6.	"Thirst Trap"	Hobert	3:05
7.	"Chateau"	Hobert	3:18
8.	"Sex and the City"	Hobert	2:49
9.	"Shooting Star"	Hobert; Fildey	2:58
10.	"Don't Go Back to His Ass"	Hobert; Fildey	2:57
11.	"Phoebe"	Hobert	3:53
12.	"Silver Jubilee"	Hobert; Fildey	2:58
Total length:			34:54

=== Notes ===
- "I Like to Touch People", "Sue Me", "Bowling Alley", "Sex and the City", "Shooting Star", and "Don't Go Back to His Ass" are stylized in sentence case.

== Personnel ==
Credits adapted from Tidal.

=== Musicians ===
- Audrey Hobert – vocals (all tracks), acoustic guitar (1, 7–8), percussion (11), synthesizer (11)
- Ricky Gourmet – associated performer (7), bass (all tracks), guitar (all tracks), percussion (3–7, 11), programming (all tracks), synthesizer (all tracks), vocals (3–4, 12)
- Miles Morris – drums (1–4, 6–12)
- David Marinelli – synthesizer (2, 12)
- Kurtis Shaffer – saxophone (6)
- Charlie Hobert – associated performer (7), background vocals (10)
- Ella Hobert – associated performer (7), background vocals (10)
- Malcolm Todd – associated performer (7), background vocals (10)
- Jesse McGinty – horns (11)

=== Technical ===
- Dale Becker – mastering (all tracks)
- Serban Ghenea – mixing (2)
- Jon Castelli – mixing (1, 3–12)

== Charts ==
Chart performance for Who's the Clown?
Chart (2025–2026)	Peak position
Australian Albums (ARIA)	23
Irish Albums (IRMA)	65
New Zealand Albums (RMNZ)	22
Scottish Albums (Official Charts)	9
UK Albums (Official Charts)	81
US Billboard 200	136
