= Sue Me (Audrey Hobert song) =

2025 debut single by Audrey Hobert

Single by Audrey Hobert

from the album Who's the Clown?
- Released: May 9, 2025
- Genre: Pop; electropop; dance-pop
- Length: 2:50
- Label: RCA
- Songwriters: Audrey Hobert; Matthew Fildey
- Producer: Ricky Gourmet

Audrey Hobert singles chronology
| "Sue Me" (2025) | "Bowling Alley" (2025) |

"Sue Me" is the debut single by American singer-songwriter Audrey Hobert, released on May 9, 2025, through RCA Records. Co-written by Hobert with its producer, Ricky Gourmet, it is an upbeat pop song about the desire to feel wanted after a breakup. Hobert directed and edited the accompanying music video.

The song was Hobert's first release under her own name, following her work co-writing songs for Gracie Abrams, including "That's So True". Critics highlighted its catchiness and Hobert's plainspoken lyrics. After a gradual build on American pop radio in 2025, "Sue Me" became a sleeper hit in 2026, reaching number 57 on the US Billboard Hot 100 and number 21 on the UK Singles Chart. It is the second track on Hobert's debut studio album, Who's the Clown? (2025).

== Background and release ==
Before releasing music under her own name, Hobert co-wrote songs for Gracie Abrams and others, and signed a publishing deal with Universal Music Group, through which she met producer Ricky Gourmet. "Sue Me" was among the first songs they made together. Hobert has said it was the fifth song she wrote by herself, though the released version is also credited to Gourmet. (Note: In the song's writing credits, Gourmet is listed under the name Matthew Fildey.)

Hobert wrote the song the week after reconnecting with a former partner; she said it grew from a phrase about wanting to feel wanted, which she then set to a melody, and described the track as "pure relief". She promoted the single with a self-shot TikTok campaign in which she danced to the unreleased song in her bedroom, ahead of its May 9 release.

== Composition and lyrics ==
"Sue Me" is a pop song. Billboard characterized it as a "dance-pop" track about rekindling a relationship with an ex. Writing for Stereogum, Margaret Farrell described it as a carefree, sugary pop record, likening its sound to a meeting between Sky Ferreira's "Lost in My Bedroom" and Taylor Swift's "Style". NPR's Isabella Gomez Sarmiento described it as a Kesha-esque confessional. Hobert cited a line about her ex's Amazon Basics clothing as her favorite in the song.

== Critical reception ==
"Sue Me" received generally positive reviews. Farrell of Stereogum welcomed Hobert as a new pop artist and praised the single's exuberance. In Nylon, Lauren McCarthy called it an assured, fearless pop debut and a summer earworm. Billboard's Kyle Denis described the song as an especially catchy dance-pop track. Gomez Sarmiento of NPR attributed its traction to Hobert's oddly specific lyrics and her unselfconscious performing style.

== Commercial performance ==
"Sue Me" was Hobert's first entry on a Billboard chart as a lead artist, debuting at number 39 on the US Pop Airplay chart for the week of August 9, 2025; by mid-August it had surpassed 23 million streams on Spotify. It continued to grow at pop radio and reached a peak of number 23 on the Pop Airplay chart. On August 22, 2026, it returned to pop radio at number 29.

More than a year after its release, "Sue Me" returned to the charts in mid-2026. It debuted at number 98 on the US Billboard Hot 100. In the United Kingdom, the song reached number 21 on the UK Singles Chart.

== Music video ==
The music video for "Sue Me" was directed and edited by Hobert, which was part of her stated intention to direct every video for the project herself. It consists of a montage of Hobert dancing—alone and with Gourmet—while a clown sits in the corner ignoring them. The self-made video was widely shared on social media.

== Live performances ==
Hobert performed "Sue Me" on The Tonight Show Starring Jimmy Fallon on October 20, 2025, her television debut, and has performed it live on tour.

== Credits and personnel ==
Credits adapted from official release metadata.

- Audrey Hobert – vocals, songwriting
- Matthew Fildey, professionally known as Ricky Gourmet – songwriting, production, bass

== Charts ==
Weekly chart performance for "Sue Me"
| Chart (2025–2026) | Peak position |
|---|---|
| Canada Hot 100 (Billboard) | 56 |
| Canada CHR/Top 40 (Billboard) | 36 |
| Ireland (IRMA) | 12 |
| Italy Airplay (EarOne) | 41 |
| New Zealand Hot Singles (RMNZ) | 13 |
| San Marino Airplay (SMRTV Top 50) | 33 |
| UK Singles (Official Charts) | 21 |
| US Billboard Hot 100 | 57 |
| US Pop Airplay (Billboard) | 17 |

== Certifications ==
Certifications for "Sue Me"
| Region | Certification | Certified units/sales |
|---|---|---|
| Canada (Music Canada) | Platinum | 80,000^{‡} |
| New Zealand (RMNZ) | Gold | 15,000^{‡} |
| United Kingdom (BPI) | Silver | 200,000^{‡} |
| United States (RIAA) | Gold | 500,000^{‡} |
^{‡} Sales+streaming figures based on certification alone.
