= The Secret of Us Tour =

2024–25 concert tour by Gracie Abrams

- Tour by Gracie Abrams
- Promotional poster
- Location: Asia; Europe; North America; Oceania
- Associated album: The Secret of Us
- Start date: September 5, 2024
- End date: August 27, 2025
- No. of shows: 83
- Supporting acts: Ashe; Dora Jar; Role Model; Djo; Griff

Gracie Abrams concert chronology
- Good Riddance Tour (2023–2024); The Secret of Us Tour (2024–2025); The Look at My Life Tour (2026–2027)

The Secret of Us Tour was the fourth concert tour by American singer-songwriter Gracie Abrams, in support of her second studio album, The Secret of Us (2024). The tour began on September 5, 2024, in Portland, Oregon, United States, and concluded on August 27, 2025, in Mexico City, Mexico.

== Background ==
Abrams announced the United States dates for the tour on June 3, 2024. More shows were expected to be announced at a later date, as she titled these dates (pt. 1...) in the announcement. Fans in the United Kingdom had the chance to pre-order the album from her official store, which gave them access to a presale. Second shows in New York, Los Angeles, and Denver were added due to high demand. Third shows in New York and Los Angeles were also added for the same reason.

Fans could sign up for a presale code through Seated registration presale, which began on June 4 at 10am local time. A Live Nation and Ticketmaster presale was scheduled for 10am local time on June 5, and a Spotify presale was scheduled for 10am local time on June 6. General public ticket sales began on Friday, June 7 at 10am local time through Ticketmaster. The tour also includes two VIP packages, the Close To You Premium Package and the Gracie Abrams VIP Package.

The European dates were announced on July 15, 2024. The Oceania dates were announced on September 1, 2024. The Asia dates were announced on December 2, 2024. A second North American leg, billed as The Secret Of Us Deluxe Tour, was announced on December 9, 2024. Additional dates were added due to high demand.

== Setlist ==
=== 2024 ===
This setlist was taken from the show in Portland on September 5, 2024. It does not represent all shows throughout the 2024 tour.

1. "Felt Good About You"
2. "Risk"
3. "Blowing Smoke"
4. "21"
5. "I Love You, I'm Sorry"
6. "Where Do We Go Now?"
7. "Gave You I Gave You I"
8. "Mess It Up"
9. "Full Machine"
10. Surprise Song
11. "Good Luck Charlie"
12. "I Knew It, I Know You"
13. "I Know It Won't Work"
14. "Friend"
15. "Normal Thing"
16. "Feels Like"
17. "Let It Happen"
18. "Tough Love"
19. "I Miss You, I'm Sorry"
20. "Free Now"

Encore

21. "Us"
22. "Close To You"

=== 2025 ===
This setlist was taken from the show in Sydney on May 2, 2025. It does not represent all shows throughout the 2025 tour.

1. "Felt Good About You"
2. "Risk"
3. "Blowing Smoke"
4. "21"
5. "I Love You, I'm Sorry"
6. "Where Do We Go Now?"
7. "Gave You I Gave You I"
8. "Mess It Up"
9. "Friend"
10. "Camden"
11. "Normal Thing"
12. "I Told You Things"
13. "Let It Happen"
14. "Tough Love"
15. Surprise song
16. "Cool"
17. "I Miss You, I'm Sorry"
18. "Us"
19. "Free Now"

Encore

20. "That's So True"
21. "Close To You"

=== The Secret of Us Deluxe Tour ===
This setlist was taken from the show in Boston on July 23, 2025. It does not represent all shows throughout the deluxe tour.

1. "Risk"
2. "Blowing Smoke"
3. "21"
4. "I Love You, I'm Sorry"
5. "Where Do We Go Now?"
6. "Death Wish"
7. "Normal Thing"
8. "Friend"
9. "Mess It Up"
10. "Packing It Up"
11. "Full Machine"
12. "I Told You Things"
13. "Out of Nowhere"
14. "Let It Happen"
15. "Tough Love"

B stage

16. Surprise song
17. "Cool"
18. "I Miss You, I'm Sorry"

C stage

19. "Right Now"
20. "Free Now"

Main stage

21. "Us"

Encore

22. "That's So True"
23. "Close To You"

=== Notes ===
- At the third show in Los Angeles and the first show in Boston, "Feels Like" was performed with Role Model.
- At the first show in New York City, "That's So True" was performed after "Full Machine." "Mess It Up" was not performed.
- Starting with the second show in New York City, "That's So True" was performed in place of "Full Machine".
- During her set at Glastonbury Festival, Abrams covered "Just like Heaven" by The Cure.
- During her set at BST Hyde Park, Abrams brought out Aaron Dessner to perform an unreleased song titled "Crazy Girl", "I Love You, I'm Sorry", and "Where Do We Go Now?".
- At the third show in Boston, Noah Kahan joined Abrams on stage to perform "Everywhere, Everything".
- At the fourth show in New York City, Role Model joined Abrams on stage to perform "Mess It Up." "Friend" was not performed.
- At her fifth show in New York City, Lizzy McAlpine joined Abrams on stage to sing "Ceilings".
- During her set at Lollapalooza, Abrams brought out Robyn to perform "Dancing on My Own" together.
- At the first show in Inglewood, Audrey Hobert joined Abrams on stage to perform an unreleased song titled "Minibar" and "That's So True".
- At the second show in Morrison, Griff joined Abrams on stage to perform "I Know It Won't Work".

=== Surprise songs ===
Abrams performs one surprise song from her discography at each show after "Full Machine" in 2024, and after "Tough Love" in 2025.

- September 5 – Portland: "Right Now"
- September 6 – Seattle: "Camden"
- September 8 – Berkeley: "The Bottom"
- September 9 – Los Angeles: "That's So True" (with Audrey Hobert)
- September 11 – Los Angeles: "I Should Hate You"
- September 12 – Los Angeles: "Best"
- September 15 – Denver: "Older"
- September 16 – Denver: "Better"
- September 19 – Irving: "In Between"
- September 20 – Houston: "The Blue"
- September 22 – Austin: "This Is What The Drugs Are For"
- September 24 – Kansas City: "Wishful Thinking"
- September 25 – Minneapolis: "Amelie"
- September 27 – Chicago: "Cool"
- September 29 – Nashville: "Abby"
- September 30 – Atlanta: "Difficult"
- October 2 – Washington, D.C.: "Fault Line"
- October 4 – New York City: "Rockland"
- October 5 – New York City: "Packing It Up"
- October 9 – Boston: "Augusta"
- October 10 – Portland: "Long Sleeves"
- October 14 – New York: "Block Me Out"
- October 15 – Philadelphia: "Right Now"
- February 8 – Madrid: "Mean It"
- February 9 – Madrid: "Feels Like"
- February 11 – Lisbon: "Amelie"
- February 15 – Stuttgart: "Difficult"
- February 17 – Amsterdam: "Packing It Up"
- February 19 – Hamburg: "Stay" and "Call Me When You Break Up"
- February 21 – Düsseldorf: "405"
- February 22 – Berlin: "Long Sleeves"
- February 24 – Zürich: "Two People"
- February 25 – Milan: "Best" and "Cold Goodbyes"
- February 27 – Paris: "Cedar"
- March 6 – London: "Right Now" and "Death Wish"
- March 7 – Manchester: "Block Me Out"
- March 8 – Cardiff: "Fault Line" and "The Blue"
- March 10 – Dublin: "Good Luck Charlie"
- March 12 – Glasgow: "Older" and "Wishful Thinking"
- March 13 – Leeds: "In Between"
- April 3 – Singapore: "Feels Like"
- April 6 – Seoul: "Tehe"
- April 8 – Tokyo: "405"
- April 10 – Shanghai: "I Know It Won't Work"
- April 14 – Hong Kong: "Full Machine"
- April 17 – Taipei: "The Bottom"
- April 19 – Bangkok: "Stay"
- April 29 – Auckland: "Liability" (Lorde cover)
- May 2 – Sydney: "Torn" (Natalie Imbruglia cover)
- May 3 – Sydney: "This Is What The Drugs Are For"
- May 4 – Sydney: "Painkillers" and "In Between"
- May 6 – Brisbane: "Best"
- May 7 – Brisbane: "Abby"
- May 9 – Melbourne: "Right Now" and "I Knew It, I Know You"
- May 10 – Melbourne: "Better" and "Mean It"
- May 11 – Melbourne: "Amelie"
- May 13 – Adelaide: "405"
- May 16 – Perth: "Full Machine" / "I Know It Won't Work" / "Cedar"
- May 17 – Perth: "For Real This Time" / "Stay" / "Right Now"
- June 25 – Nottingham: "Unsteady"
- July 23 – Boston: "Augusta"
- July 24 – Boston: "Rockland"
- July 26 – Toronto: "Best"
- July 28 – New York City: "Alright"
- July 29 – New York City: "Two People"
- August 6 – Inglewood: "405" and "In Between"
- August 7 – Inglewood: "All Too Well (10 Minute Version)" (Taylor Swift cover)
- August 11 – Morrison: "Block Me Out"
- August 26 – Mexico City: "I Knew It, I Know You"
- August 27 – Mexico City: "Minor"

=== Notes ===
- "That's So True", "Cool", and "Packing It Up" were unreleased at the time they were performed in 2024.
- "Call Me When You Break Up", "Death Wish", "Cold Goodbyes", and "Out of Nowhere" were unreleased at the time they were performed.
- "In Between" is a currently unreleased song.
- "Abby" is only available on vinyl.

== Tour dates ==
List of 2024 concerts
Date (2024)	City	Country	Venue	Opening acts
September 5	Portland	United States	Alaska Airlines' Theater of the Clouds	Role Model
September 6	Seattle	United States	WaMu Theater	Role Model
September 8	Berkeley	United States	The Greek Theatre	Role Model
September 9	Los Angeles	United States	Greek Theatre	Role Model
September 11	Los Angeles	United States	Greek Theatre	Role Model
September 12	Los Angeles	United States	Greek Theatre	Role Model
September 15	Denver	United States	Fillmore Auditorium	Role Model
September 16	Denver	United States	Fillmore Auditorium	Role Model
September 19	Irving	United States	The Pavilion at Toyota Music Factory	Role Model
September 20	Houston	United States	713 Music Hall	Role Model
September 22	Austin	United States	Moody Amphitheater	Role Model
September 24	Kansas City	United States	Uptown Theater	Role Model
September 25	Minneapolis	United States	The Armory	Role Model
September 27	Chicago	United States	Byline Bank Aragon Ballroom	Role Model
September 29	Nashville	United States	Ryman Auditorium	Role Model
September 30	Atlanta	United States	Coca-Cola Roxy	Role Model
October 2	Washington, D.C.	United States	The Anthem	Role Model
October 4	New York City	United States	Radio City Music Hall	Role Model
October 5	New York City	United States	Radio City Music Hall	Role Model
October 9	Boston	United States	MGM Music Hall at Fenway	Role Model
October 10	Portland	United States	State Theatre	—N/a
October 14 (Note: This show was originally scheduled for October 6, 2024, but was rescheduled due to a vocal injury.)	New York City	United States	Radio City Music Hall	—N/a
October 15 (Note: This show was originally scheduled for October 8, 2024, but was rescheduled due to a vocal injury.)	Philadelphia	United States	The Met Philadelphia	—N/a

List of 2025 concerts
Date (2025)	City	Country	Venue	Opening acts
February 8	Madrid	Spain	Palacio Vistalegre	Dora Jar
February 9	Madrid	Spain	Palacio Vistalegre	Dora Jar
February 11	Lisbon	Portugal	MEO Arena	Dora Jar
February 15	Stuttgart	Germany	Porsche Arena	Dora Jar
February 17	Amsterdam	Netherlands	Ziggo Dome	Dora Jar
February 19	Hamburg	Germany	Alsterdorfer Sporthalle	Dora Jar
February 21	Düsseldorf	Germany	Mitsubishi Electric Halle	Dora Jar
February 22	Berlin	Germany	Velodrom	Dora Jar
February 24 (Note: The venue for this show was upgraded from The Hall following high demand.)	Zürich	Switzerland	Hallenstadion	Dora Jar
February 25 (Note: The venue for this show was upgraded from Alcatraz following high demand.)	Assago (Note: Billed as Milan in promotional material.)	Italy	Unipol Forum	Dora Jar
February 27	Paris	France	Accor Arena	Dora Jar
March 6	London	England	The O_{2} Arena	Dora Jar
March 7	Manchester	England	Co-op Live	Dora Jar
March 8	Cardiff	Wales	Utilita Arena	Dora Jar
March 10	Dublin	Ireland	3Arena	Dora Jar
March 12	Glasgow	Scotland	OVO Hydro	Dora Jar
March 13 (Note: This show was originally scheduled to take place on March 4, 2025, but was rescheduled due to illness.)	Leeds	England	First Direct Arena	Dora Jar
April 3	Singapore		The Star Theatre	—N/a
April 6	Seoul	South Korea	Myunghwa Live	—N/a
April 8	Tokyo	Japan	Zepp Haneda	—N/a
April 10	Shanghai	China	Music Park	—N/a
April 14	Hong Kong		MacPherson Stadium	—N/a
April 17	Taipei	Taiwan	TICC	—N/a
April 19	Bangkok	Thailand	UOB LIVE	—N/a
April 29	Auckland	New Zealand	Spark Arena	Ashe
May 2	Sydney	Australia	Qudos Bank Arena	Ashe
May 3	Sydney	Australia	Qudos Bank Arena	Ashe
May 4	Sydney	Australia	Qudos Bank Arena	Ashe
May 6	Brisbane	Australia	Brisbane Entertainment Centre	Ashe
May 7	Brisbane	Australia	Brisbane Entertainment Centre	Ashe
May 9	Melbourne	Australia	Rod Laver Arena	Ashe
May 10	Melbourne	Australia	Rod Laver Arena	Ashe
May 11	Melbourne	Australia	Rod Laver Arena	Ashe
May 13	Adelaide	Australia	Adelaide Entertainment Centre	Ashe
May 16	Perth	Australia	RAC Arena	Ashe
May 17	Perth	Australia	RAC Arena	Ashe
June 23 (Note: This show was originally scheduled to take place on February 28, 2025, but was rescheduled due to illness.)	Brussels	Belgium	Forest National	Dora Jar
June 25 (Note: This show was originally scheduled to take place on March 3, 2025, but was rescheduled due to illness.)	Nottingham	England	Motorpoint Arena	Dora Jar
June 27 (Note: This show is part of the Glastonbury Festival.)	Pilton	England	Worthy Farm	—N/a
July 2 (Note: This show is part of the Open'er Festival.)	Gdynia	Poland	Gdynia-Kosakowo Airport	—N/a
July 4 (Note: This show is a part of BST Hyde Park, where Abrams is supporting Noah Kahan.)	London	England	Hyde Park	—N/a
July 5 (Note: This show is part of Main Square Festival.)	Arras	France	La Citadelle	—N/a
July 6 (Note: This show is part of Rock Werchter.)	Werchter	Belgium	Festivalpark Werchter Belgium	—N/a
July 9 (Note: This show is part of Cruïlla Festival.)	Barcelona	Spain	Parc del Fòrum	—N/a
July 10 (Note: This show is part of Mad Cool Festival.)	Madrid	Spain	Iberdrola Music	—N/a
July 12 (Note: This show is part of Lollapalooza Berlin.)	Berlin	Germany	Olympiastadion	—N/a
July 13 (Note: This show is part of TRNSMT Festival.)	Glasgow	Scotland	Glasgow Green	—N/a
July 23 (Note: Billed as The Secret of Us Deluxe Tour.)	Boston	United States	TD Garden	Djo
July 24	Boston	United States	TD Garden	Djo
July 26	Toronto	Canada	Budweiser Stage	Djo
July 28	New York City	United States	Madison Square Garden	Role Model
July 29	New York City	United States	Madison Square Garden	Role Model
July 31 (Note: This show is part of Lollapalooza.)	Chicago	United States	Grant Park	—N/a
August 2 (Note: This show is part of Osheaga.)	Montreal	Canada	Parc Jean-Drapeau	—N/a
August 6	Inglewood (Note: Billed as Los Angeles in promotional material.)	United States	Kia Forum	Griff
August 7	Inglewood	United States	Kia Forum	Griff
August 9 (Note: This show is part of Outside Lands.)	San Francisco	United States	Golden Gate Park	—N/a
August 11	Morrison	United States	Red Rocks Amphitheatre	Griff
August 12	Morrison	United States	Red Rocks Amphitheatre	Griff
August 26	Mexico City	Mexico	Pepsi Center WTC	Role Model
August 27	Mexico City	Mexico	Pepsi Center WTC	Role Model

== Personnel ==
Adapted from the credits of Apple Music Live: Gracie Abrams concert film.

Artist

- Gracie Abrams — lead vocals, guitar, keys

Band & Music Direction

- Cooper Cowgill — musical director, bass
- Elle Puckett — guitar, vocals
- Casey Kalmenson — keys, guitar, vocals
- Gabe Smith — drums, vocals

Tour Production / Audio / Lighting / Video / Design

- Vinnie Ferra — tour director / creative director (The Beehive LA)
- Mike “Mac” McAree — production manager
- Mackenzie “Mac” Dunster — tour manager
- Jonny Stiegler (The Beehive LA) — touring operations
- Dom Rizco — front of house engineer (FOH)
- Juan Carlos Garcia-Spitz — monitor engineer
- Moath Hattab — A&R (Interscope), executive creative director
- Clair Global — audio vendor (console/package)
- Michael Brown — production design / creative direction
- Ben Krall — video design
- Taylor Glatt — lighting director
- Zach Sternberg — assistant lighting designer / lighting programmer
- Creative Technology (CT) — visuals / LED / rigging (EU/UK)
- Clearwing — lighting / video / rigging / staging (North America)
