= The Nature of Us =

American LGBTQ+ coming-of-age web series

- Genre: Web series; LGBTQ+; Coming-of-age; Romance; Drama
- Created by: Josh Cox
- Written by: Josh Cox
- Directed by: Josh Cox
- Starring: Benjamin Piers; Sean Manucha; Mateo Correa; Alison Newton
- Country of origin: United States
- Original language: English
- No. of seasons: 1
- No. of episodes: 6

Production
- Production locations: Cape Cod, Massachusetts
- Running time: Approximately 10 minutes
- Production company: Americana Pictures

Original release
- Network: YouTube
- Release: August 1, 2025 – present

The Nature of Us is an American LGBTQ+ coming-of-age web series created by Josh Cox. The series follows the relationship between two 18-year-olds, Elly and Yona, as they navigate identity, mental health, and personal growth during the fall after their high school graduation. It premiered on YouTube on August 1, 2025.

== Synopsis ==
Set in Cape Cod, Massachusetts, The Nature of Us explores the journey of Elly, a sensitive artist recently discharged from mental health treatment, and Yona, a classmate newly out of the closet.

Their evolving relationship unfolds over six episodes, each approximately 10 minutes long, capturing the complexities of young love, self-discovery, and emotional healing.

== Production and development ==
The series was created, written, directed, shot, and edited by Josh Cox, a native of Sandwich, Massachusetts. Originally conceived as a feature film, Cox later restructured the project into an episodic web series to allow each chapter to develop with greater depth and emotional resonance.

Cox cited inspiration from the Netflix series Heartstopper and the film Call Me by Your Name for the tone and themes of The Nature of Us. The project began development in October 2023 and is seen as Cox's most personal and ambitious work to date.

== Cast ==
- Benjamin Piers as Elly
- Alison Newton as Rowen
- Sean Manucha as Yona
- Mateo Correa as Dre

Benjamin Piers is the only Cape Cod native in the main cast and has a longstanding personal connection with Cox, having acted under his direction during their school years.

== Episodes ==
No.	Title	Directed by	Written by	Original release date
1	""Fresh out the mental hospital""	Josh Cox	Josh Cox	1 August 2025
2	""Gay Shakespeare""	Josh Cox	Josh Cox	5 August 2025
3	""Wants & Needs""	Josh Cox	Josh Cox	8 August 2025
4	""New ground, same earth""	Josh Cox	Josh Cox	12 August 2025
5	""Departures & distractions""	Josh Cox	Josh Cox	15 August 2025
6	""Finale""	Josh Cox	Josh Cox	22 August 2025

== Filming locations ==
The Nature of Us was filmed entirely on location in Cape Cod, Massachusetts. Notable locations include:

- Crystal Lake, Orleans
- Sea Call Farm, Orleans
- Wellfleet
- Yarmouth
- Underground Art Gallery, Brewster

These settings are said to enrich the narrative with a distinctly local and authentic atmosphere.

== Release and reception ==
The series premiered on YouTube on 1 August 2025, with episodes released weekly. The Nature of Us has been praised for its quiet, tender portrayal of queer youth and universal themes of love and growth.

A review in The Fandomentals described the series as "a tender ode to young love," highlighting its "remarkably sweet, patient coming-of-age romance."

Instinct Magazine called the show “heartfelt, messy, and tender—exactly what you want in a queer coming-of-age story,” praising its nostalgic and relatable tone.

The series has also been compared to Call Me by Your Name for its intimate storytelling and emotional subtlety. Critics noted its "quiet crush of a coming-out story" tone, emphasizing the emotional awakening and vulnerability of queer youth.

Gayety praised the show’s “deeply authentic and resonant storytelling,” emphasizing Cox’s personal connection to the character of Elly and the series’ balance of sweetness with raw honesty.

Edge Media Network dubbed The Nature of Us a “moving, personal web series,” applauding its “gentle, unhurried storytelling” and its willingness to address the complexities of mental health, familial relationships, and LGBTQ+ youth without sensationalism. They highlighted the portrayal of queer intimacy as “neither sensationalized nor reduced to stereotypes,” calling the series an intimate and emotionally resonant depiction of healing and self-discovery. The publication also noted a surge of fan engagement following its premiere, with viewers praising the authenticity of the characters and sharing personal connections to the themes of queer love and healing.

== Soundtrack ==
The official soundtrack features the song "us." by Gracie Abrams, featuring Taylor Swift. The track is prominently used in the series’ trailer.
