= I Miss You, I'm Sorry (disambiguation) =

"I Miss You, I'm Sorry" is a song by Gracie Abrams.

I Miss You, I'm Sorry may also refer to:

- "I Miss You, I'm Sorry", a song by Kita Alexander
- "I Miss You, I'm Sorry", a 2021 song by Odette from Herald (album)
