= Us (Gracie Abrams song) =

2024 song by Gracie Abrams featuring Taylor Swift

Song by Gracie Abrams featuring Taylor Swift

from the album The Secret of Us
- Released: June 21, 2024
- Studio: Long Pond (Hudson Valley)
- Length: 4:02
- Label: Interscope
- Songwriters: Gracie Abrams; Taylor Swift; Aaron Dessner
- Producers: Gracie Abrams; Taylor Swift; Aaron Dessner; Jack Antonoff

Lyric video
- "Us" on YouTube

"Us" (stylized as "us.") is a song recorded by the American singer-songwriter Gracie Abrams for her second studio album, The Secret of Us (2024). Featuring vocals from the American singer-songwriter Taylor Swift, the song was written and produced by Abrams, Swift, and Aaron Dessner, with additional production from Jack Antonoff. It was released on June 21, 2024, by Interscope Records, as the fifth track from The Secret of Us.

== Background ==
"Us" is the first collaboration between Gracie Abrams and Taylor Swift. The collaboration originated during Abrams's time as an opening act for Swift on the North American leg of her Eras Tour in 2023. On June 23, 2024, when the tour was on its third night at Wembley Stadium, London (UK), Abrams joined Swift on stage for the first live performance of the song. As part of the show's acoustic surprise song set, the performance featured Abrams on piano and Swift on guitar. Abrams has frequently cited Swift as a major influence on her music. The experience of touring with Swift significantly influenced Abrams's writing process for her new album. The second time, Abrams also joined Swift on stage to celebrate the song's nomination for the Grammy Awards during the tour's third night in Toronto in a mashup with Swift's other song "Out of the Woods" (2014).

The song was co-written and produced with longtime collaborators Aaron Dessner and Jack Antonoff. Additional contributions to the track include Rob Moose, Laura Sisk, James McAlister, and Jonathan Low. During the writing session for "Us", a candle accidentally started a fire in Swift's apartment, which the two extinguished together. The incident was captured in a video shared by Abrams. The track was ultimately recorded at Dessner's Long Pond Studios in Hudson Valley, New York.

== Composition ==
"Us" is a song that features introspective lyrics and a mellow, acoustic-driven production. The song explores themes of love, heartbreak, and personal growth. The lyrics are reflective, addressing the complexities of a past relationship and the lingering feelings of loss and yearning. Musically, the track features a mix of fingerpicked guitar, subtle strings, and a gentle piano, elements characteristic of Aaron Dessner's production style. Dessner played multiple instruments on the track, including acoustic guitar, electric guitar, mandolin, piano, synthesizer, drum programming, and Mellotron. Jack Antonoff contributed with cello, drums, acoustic guitar, electric guitar, percussion, synthesizer, and programming. Rob Moose played viola and violin.

== Critical reception ==
Upon release, "Us" received positive reviews from music critics. Rolling Stone described the track as a standout on the album, noting its "emotional resonance and beautifully crafted melodies". Billboard described the track as "an anthemic folk number, with a polished pop production." Nylon noted that their voices "reflect on past relationships and question if their exes miss the connection as much as they do."

Critics also highlighted the production work of Dessner and Antonoff as key elements that enhance the song's emotional impact. The New York Times commended the song's lyrical depth, noting how the reflective and introspective lyrics resonate with listeners. In a review from Variety, the publication described the song as a "lush and introspective ballad" that effectively combines the strengths of both artists. Billboard noted that the song's polished production and harmonious vocals make it a standout track on Abrams's album.

== Commercial performance ==
Upon its release, "Us" quickly gained attention on streaming platforms, becoming the best-performing song from The Secret of Us on Spotify within a day of its release. The song's success was also noted in an article by Forbes, which emphasized its immediate impact on the charts and its significant streaming numbers. The song debuted and peaked at number 36 on the Billboard Hot 100 for the week dated July 6, 2024, becoming Abrams's biggest Hot 100 hit at the time, before being surpassed by "I Love You, I'm Sorry".

== Accolades ==
Awards and nominations for "Us."
Organization	Year	Category	Result	Ref.
Grammy Awards	2025	Best Pop Duo/Group Performance	Nominated	

== Personnel ==
- Gracie Abrams – vocals, piano, songwriter, producer
- Taylor Swift – vocals, songwriter, producer
- Aaron Dessner – producer, songwriter, acoustic guitar, electric guitar, mandolin, piano, synthesizer, drum programming, Mellotron
- Jack Antonoff – producer, cello, drums, acoustic guitar, electric guitar, percussion, programmer, synthesizer, Mellotron
- Rob Moose – viola, violin, recording engineer
- James McAlister – drum programming, sound effects, programming, recording engineer
- Laura Sisk – recording engineer
- Jonathan Low– recording engineer
- Bella Blasko – recording engineer
- Oli Jacobs – additional engineer
- Jack Manning – additional engineer
- Serban Ghenea – mixing
- Bryce Bordone – mix engineer
- Randy Merrill – mastering engineer

== Charts ==
Chart performance for "Us"
Chart (2024)	Peak position
Australia (ARIA)	25
Canada Hot 100 (Billboard)	31
Global 200 (Billboard)	34
Ireland (IRMA)	35
Japan Hot Overseas (Billboard Japan)	11
New Zealand (Recorded Music NZ)	30
Portugal (AFP)	85
UK Singles (Official Charts)	37
US Billboard Hot 100	36

== Certifications ==
Certifications for "Us"
Region	Certification	Certified units/sales
Australia (ARIA)	Platinum	70,000^{‡}
Brazil (Pro-Música Brasil)	Gold	20,000^{‡}
Canada (Music Canada)	Platinum	80,000^{‡}
New Zealand (RMNZ)	Gold	15,000^{‡}
United Kingdom (BPI)	Silver	200,000^{‡}
^{‡} Sales+streaming figures based on certification alone.

== Featured in media ==
The song scores the official trailer for the 2025 LGBTQ coming-of-age series The Nature of Us which compliments its themes of complex young love depicted in the series, mirroring both the title of the song and its lyrics.

The music is used as the main theme song for the Japanese dating reality show Offline Love on Netflix.
