= Risk (song) =

2024 single by Gracie Abrams

Single by Gracie Abrams

from the album The Secret of Us
- B-side: "Close to You"
- Written: August 2023
- Released: May 1, 2024
- Studio: Long Pond (Hudson Valley); Studio in Los Angeles
- Genre: Pop
- Length: 3:11
- Label: Interscope
- Songwriters: Gracie Abrams; Audrey Hobert
- Producers: Gracie Abrams; Aaron Dessner

Gracie Abrams singles chronology
"Everywhere, Everything" (2023)	"Risk" (2024)	"Close to You" (2024)

Music video
- "Risk" on YouTube

"Risk" is a song by the American singer-songwriter Gracie Abrams from her second studio album, The Secret of Us (2024). It was released by Interscope Records on May 1, 2024, as the album's lead single. Abrams wrote the song with her friend, Audrey Hobert, in August 2023, and produced it with her frequent collaborator Aaron Dessner. It was recorded at Dessner's Long Pond Studio in the Hudson Valley and at a studio in Los Angeles.

"Risk" is a pop song driven by strings, guitar strumming, and jittery vocals. It is an energetic ballad about Abrams's infatuation with a man she has never met; it is sung like a breakup song. Music critics said the track drew comparisons to Taylor Swift, among other musicians. The track was positively received by music critics, who generally praised the song's chorus and melody. It reached the national charts of various countries and received certifications in Australia, Canada, Portugal, and the United Kingdom.

A music video directed by Hobert for "Risk" premiered alongside the song's release and depicts Abrams on a dark suburban street; she is shown drinking wine, crashing parties, and contemplating love. The song was released on vinyl on May 30, 2024, with "Close to You" serving as its B-side. Abrams performed "Risk" on The Tonight Show Starring Jimmy Fallon and The Today Show, and included it in the set list of the Secret of Us Tour (2024–2025) and in Swift's Eras Tour (2024).

== Background and release ==
Gracie Abrams announced her second studio album, The Secret of Us, on April 29, 2024, subsequently revealing its cover artwork and release date. She also announced "Risk" as its lead single, which was released on May 1, through Interscope Records. Abrams said "Risk" was co-written with her friend, singer-songwriter Audrey Hobert, and co-produced by her frequent collaborator Aaron Dessner, who produced her previous album, Good Riddance (2023). A 7-inch vinyl format of the single, which included Abrams's song "Close to You" as its B-side, was released on May 31. The Secret of Us was released through Interscope on June 21; "Risk" appears as its second track.

== Writing and production ==
"Risk" marked a new approach to Abrams's songwriting, as she would generally write her songs alone. When Abrams started working on The Secret of Us, she moved in with Hobert; when Abrams would come home, they would have lots of things to share with each other, which inspired the two to write songs together. "Risk" was the first track they wrote for the album; Abrams stated it "immediately felt right" to release it as the lead single. She also called it "the first chapter" and viewed it as an introduction to her mindset during the album's early writing process. Abrams and Hobert wrote the track in August 2023.

"Risk" was recorded by Bella Blasko with additional engineering from Maryam Qudus at Dessner's Long Pond Studio in the Hudson Valley and by James McAlister in Los Angeles. It was mixed by Serban Ghenea with assistance from Bryce Bordone at MixStar Studios in Virginia Beach, Virginia. Randy Merrill handled its mastering at Sterling Sound in Edgewater, New Jersey.

== Music and lyrics ==
"Risk" is 3 minutes and 11 seconds long. It is a pop song driven by strings, guitar strumming on the backing track, and shaky vocals. An energetic ballad, the song is about Abrams's infatuation with a man she barely knows and getting excited over the thought of him. As the song progresses, Abrams's desire, anxiety, and confusion escalate. The lyrics transform from uncertainty—"God, I'm actually invested / Haven't even met him / Watch this be the wrong thing, classic"—to determination: "Heard the risk is drowning, but I'm gonna take it." She repeats the line "Too soon to tell you I love you" with near-exaggerated enthusiasm, which highlights both the emotion and absurdity of the song's premise.

In an interview with V, Abrams stated that "Risk" is about "falling for someone you don't actually even know yet". Speaking with Apple Music's Zane Lowe, Abrams stated that "you can't find love without taking a chance" and that it is common nature to fall in love with "someone you don't know at all". The Face's Jade Wickes thought the song's lyrics depicted Abrams "playfully nosedive into a potentially damaging fling"; Poppie Platt for The Telegraph saw it as a "tale of young love and taking chances". Chris DeVille of Stereogum thought Abrams sang the song like a "distraught breakup song to an ex", which contrasted with its lyrical content. Writing for Uproxx, Megan Armstrong called the song "pure catharsis" and thought it expressed the impulsive rush of having a love interest in a musical form. Clash's Igor Bannikov felt the song merged the moods of Elliott Smith, Joni Mitchell, and Patti Smith with its pop chorus, as well as its "modest impudence". Irene Kim of Vogue observed the track as having similarities to Taylor Swift's 2011 song "Mean"; similarly, Samuel Maude from Elle said the song has a "Taylor Swift flair".

== Critical reception ==
"Risk" was included in lists of the best pop music of its release week compiled by Billboard and Uproxx. For the former magazine, Jason Lipshutz felt the song "may be [Abrams's] ticket to new Hot 100 heights" and its chorus could be enjoyable to "shout along to on summer nights". For the latter website, Armstrong complimented the song for sounding "like eavesdropping on two love-drunk best friends venting on the couch". The writers at Elle deemed it one of the best songs of May 2024; Maude said Abrams "captures that right-before-a-date feeling" with the song and the track made him "invested in [The Secret of Us]". DeVille said that "Risk" sounded "like a hit" and felt strong, stating that it "continues Abrams's knack for memorable turns of phrase set to melodies that stick with you". Lucy Phillips from Dork praised the song for showcasing Abrams's "growth as an artist". Brittany Spanos of Rolling Stone observed that the song positively showed a shift toward a more accessible and pop-oriented sound for Abrams. For Vogue, Florence O'Connor wrote that she "instantly [jumps] out [of bed] and [starts] dancing" when she hears the song and feels it embodies the experience of having "romantic feelings for a man in 2024".

== Commercial performance ==
In the United States, "Risk" debuted and peaked at number 94 on the Billboard Hot 100 for the week ending July 6, 2024, and peaked at number 25 on the Pop Airplay chart, charting for 15 weeks. In Canada, the song charted for 16 weeks and peaked at number 64 on the Canadian Hot 100. On the UK Singles Chart, the song peaked at number 67 and charted for 8 weeks. Elsewhere, the song reached the national charts of Ireland (48) and Australia (67), and peaked at number 6 on the Japan Hot Overseas chart number 11 on the New Zealand Hot Singles chart. Following the release of the vinyl, "Risk" reached number one on the UK Physical Singles Chart. "Risk" was certified gold in Portugal and the United Kingdom and platinum in Australia and Canada.

== Live performances ==
Abrams performed live "Risk" for the first time on The Tonight Show Starring Jimmy Fallon on May 8, 2024, joined by her band. Christopher Rudolph of NBC enjoyed Abrams's appearance on Fallon, calling it an "emotional and perfect performance". On June 28, she performed it on The Today Show. Abrams included the song in the regular set list of her fourth concert tour, the Secret of Us Tour, and as part of the opening act to Taylor Swift's the Eras Tour at the end of 2024.

== Music video ==
On April 30, 2024, Abrams teased a music video for "Risk" and announced it was directed by Hobert. The video premiered on the same day as the single's release, May 1. It depicts Abrams chasing her crush in a dark suburban street on an "exhilarating night". She also is seen drinking extreme amounts of wine, wrecking parties, and considering the future of her relationship. DeVille wrote that the video "pushes 'Risk' over the top" and Nylon's Steffanee Wang called the video "intimate". Abrams praised Hobert's direction by stating: "Working together on set and at home on our couch is the most fun I have ever had in my life, she is brilliant in all the ways."

== Charts ==
Chart performance for "Risk"
Chart (2024–2025)	Peak position
Australia (ARIA)	67
Canada Hot 100 (Billboard)	64
Ireland (IRMA)	48
Japan Hot Overseas (Billboard Japan)	6
New Zealand Hot Singles (RMNZ)	11
UK Singles (Official Charts)	67
US Billboard Hot 100	94
US Pop Airplay (Billboard)	25

== Certifications ==
Certifications for "Risk"
Region	Certification	Certified units/sales
Australia (ARIA)	Platinum	70,000^{‡}
Brazil (Pro-Música Brasil)	Platinum	40,000^{‡}
Canada (Music Canada)	Platinum	80,000^{‡}
New Zealand (RMNZ)	Platinum	30,000^{‡}
Portugal (AFP)	Gold	5,000^{‡}
United Kingdom (BPI)	Gold	400,000^{‡}
^{‡} Sales+streaming figures based on certification alone.

== Release history ==
Release history and formats for "Risk"
Region	Date	Format	Label	Ref.
Various	May 1, 2024	Digital download; streaming	Interscope	
Various	May 31, 2024	7-inch single	Interscope	
