= I Love You, I'm Sorry =

2024 song by Gracie Abrams

Single by Gracie Abrams

from the album The Secret of Us
- Released: October 11, 2024
- Studio: Long Pond (Hudson Valley); Smilo Sound (Brooklyn); Studio in Los Angeles
- Genre: Pop
- Length: 2:37
- Label: Interscope
- Songwriters: Gracie Abrams; Aaron Dessner; Audrey Hobert
- Producers: Gracie Abrams; Aaron Dessner

Gracie Abrams singles chronology
"Close to You" (2024)	"I Love You, I'm Sorry" (2024)	"That's So True" (2024)

Live from Vevo cover

Music video
- "I Love You, I'm Sorry" on YouTube

"I Love You, I'm Sorry" is a song by the American singer-songwriter Gracie Abrams from her second studio album, The Secret of Us (2024). It was released as the third single from the album on October 11, 2024. The song was written by Abrams, Aaron Dessner, and Audrey Hobert, with production handled by Abrams and Dessner. It was recorded at Dessner's Long Pond Studio and at Smilo Sound; additional recording took place in Los Angeles.

The song was deemed one of best tracks from The Secret of Us by The Sydney Morning Herald and Hot Press, while Rolling Stone considered it one of the best songs of the year. It peaked at number 14 on the Billboard Global 200 and reached the national charts of numerous countries. The track was certified gold in various countries; it was certified platinum in Belgium, Portugal and the United Kingdom, two-times platinum in New Zealand, three-times platinum in Brazil, and four-times platinum in Australia and Canada. It was nominated for Best Lyrics at the 2025 iHeartRadio Music Awards.

"I Love You, I'm Sorry" is a continuation of Abrams's 2020 song "I Miss You, I'm Sorry", and provides a new outlook on the relationship first presented in the song. Though both tracks are sonically similar, "I Love You, I'm Sorry" contains more chaotic lyricism. Hobert directed the song's music video, which follows Abrams enjoying carefree moments before arriving late at an award party, receiving the "Asshole of the Year" award, and crowd surfing. She performed "I Love You, I'm Sorry" live for Vevo, at a rally for then-United States presidential candidate Kamala Harris, at Taylor Swift's the Eras Tour, on the Secret of Us Tour (2024–2025), and during her Saturday Night Live debut.

== Background and recording ==
Gracie Abrams wrote every song on her second studio album, The Secret of Us (2024), with help from Aaron Dessner and Audrey Hobert on certain tracks. Abrams also produced every song on the album; select tracks were also produced by Dessner. (Note: The album's bonus track "Close to You" was written and produced by Abrams and Sam de Jong.) Abrams began working on the album while touring with Taylor Swift on the Eras Tour; Abrams said the tour "informed so much about how [she] went about writing [The Secret of Us]".

"I Love You, I'm Sorry" was recorded by Bella Blasko at Dessner's Long Pond Studio in the Hudson Valley, by James McAlister in Los Angeles, and at Smilo Sound in Brooklyn by Rob Moose. It was mixed by Serban Ghenea with assistance from Bryce Bordone at MixStar Studios in Virginia Beach, Virginia. Randy Merrill handled its mastering at Sterling Sound in Edgewater, New Jersey. The track was written and produced by Abrams and Dessner, while Hobert provided additional songwriting.

== Composition ==
"I Love You, I'm Sorry" is 2 minutes and 37 seconds long. Its story is a continuation of Abrams's 2020 song "I Miss You, I'm Sorry"; Abrams described "I Love You, I'm Sorry" as "the book end that goes to the story", providing a new outlook on the relationship that was first written about in "I Miss You, I'm Sorry". Sonically, the two tracks are similar, though the lyrics in "I Love You, I'm Sorry" are more chaotic. Her vocals mix between sounding guilty and nonchalant, and she is written as the song's villain; though, her use of self-awareness keeps the listener "on her side". During the track's climax, she intensifies her soft vocals, creating unresolved tension. Clash's Igor Bannikov observed similarities between the song and the music of the American musician Phoebe Bridgers. He also believed the lyric "I push my luck, it shows / Thankful you don't send someone to kill me" showcases Abrams's talent for storytelling due to the influence of her father.

== Release and live performances ==
"I Love You, I'm Sorry" is the fourth track on The Secret of Us, which was released on June 21, 2024, by Interscope Records. On October 2, Vevo released a live version of song as a part of their performance series, Extended Play. The song was released as the third single from the album on October 11, by Interscope Records.

Abrams performed "I Love You, I'm Sorry" and the album song "Free Now" at a rally for then-United States presidential candidate Kamala Harris on October 30, in Madison, Wisconsin. Abrams, alongside Taylor Swift also performed a mashup of "I Love You, I'm Sorry" and Swift's song "Last Kiss" (2010) during the final two shows of The Eras Tour in December. On December 14, Abrams made her Saturday Night Live debut, performing "I Love You, I'm Sorry" alongside "That's So True" (2024). She included the song in the set list of the Secret of Us Tour throughout 2024 and 2025. She performed it on January 30, 2025, at Intuit Dome in Inglewood, California, as part of the benefit concert FireAid to help with relief efforts for the January 2025 Southern California wildfires.

== Critical reception ==
Upon its release, "I Love You, I'm Sorry" was met with positive reviews. In a review of The Secret of Us for The Sydney Morning Herald, Tom W. Clarke deemed it the album's best song; he called it "a gorgeously constructed masterclass in pop storytelling" and lauded Abrams's vocals and lyricism. Hot Press's Jillian Iredale named it a highlight track from the album. Rolling Stone included the track at number 60 in their list of the best songs of 2024. Larisha Paul mentioned Abrams's "architectural gift for crafting a great bridge", and described the bridge in "I Love You, I'm Sorry" as a "career best".

== Commercial performance ==
In the United States, "I Love You, I'm Sorry" debuted at number 83 on the Billboard Hot 100 for the week ending August 17, 2024, marking Abrams's fifth entry to the chart. At the time, it was her highest-charting song on the Hot 100, until "That's So True" surpassed it in November. In Canada, the song reached number 14 on the Canadian Hot 100 for the week ending October 26, 2024. It peaked at number 4 on the UK Singles Chart. Elsewhere, the song reached number-one in Ireland and charted in the top 20 in several countries, including Lebanon, New Zealand, and Australia. The song debuted at number 141 on the Billboard Global 200 chart for the week of August 17, and later climbed to its peak position of 14 on the week ending October 26. It was certified gold in the United States by the Recording Industry Association of America (RIAA) on October 11, 2024.

== Music video ==
Hobert, Abrams's best friend, directed the music video for "I Love You, I'm Sorry", which premiered on July 17, 2024. The video depicts Abrams riding a bicycle on the beach, drinking with friends, leaning out of a car's window with wind blowing through her hair, and reading a book in bed. It then shows her entering an award ceremony late, and receiving an award titled "Asshole of the Year". She opens the award to reveal a microphone and continues singing the song into the microphone as she crowd surfs. Writing for Dazed, Habi Diallo opined the video shows "a new playful side of Abrams", calling it "satirical and cinematic".

== Accolades ==
Awards and nominations for "I Love You, I'm Sorry"
Year	Organization	Category	Result	Ref.
2025	iHeartRadio Music Awards 2025	Best Lyrics	Nominated	
2025	2025 MTV Video Music Awards	Song of the Year	Nominated	

== Personnel ==
Credits are adapted from the liner notes of The Secret of Us.

- Gracie Abrams – vocals, percussion, songwriter, producer
- Aaron Dessner – acoustic guitar, electric guitar, bass, Minimoog, sub bass, piano, OP-1, tambourine, drums, drum programming, songwriter, producer
- Aubrey Hobert – background vocals, songwriter
- Bella Blasko – recording
- James McAlister – Moog, Ace Tone, vocal sampling, effects programming, drum programming, conga, recording
- Rob Moose – viola, violin, orchestration, recording
- Serban Ghenea – mixing
- Bryce Bordone – assistant mixer
- Randy Merrill – mastering

== Charts ==
=== Weekly charts ===
Weekly chart performance for "I Love You, I'm Sorry"
Chart (2024–2026)	Peak position
Australia (ARIA)	7
Austria (Ö3 Austria Top 40)	40
Belgium (Ultratop 50 Flanders)	9
Canada Hot 100 (Billboard)	14
Czech Republic (Singles Digitál Top 100)	100
Germany (GfK)	73
Global 200 (Billboard)	14
Greece International (IFPI)	88
Ireland (IRMA)	1
Lebanon Airplay (Lebanese Top 20)	3
Lithuania (AGATA)	88
Netherlands (Dutch Top 40)	14
Netherlands (Single Top 100)	9
New Zealand (Recorded Music NZ)	5
Nigeria Bubbling Under Hot 100 (TurnTable)	23
Norway (VG-lista)	8
Philippines (Philippines Hot 100)	64
Portugal (AFP)	12
Singapore (RIAS)	7
Slovakia Airplay (ČNS IFPI)	33
Sweden (Sverigetopplistan)	32
Switzerland (Schweizer Hitparade)	40
UK Singles (Official Charts)	4
US Billboard Hot 100	19
US Adult Pop Airplay (Billboard)	36

=== Year-end charts ===
2024 year-end chart performance for "I Love You, I'm Sorry"
Chart (2024)	Position
Australia (ARIA)	86
Netherlands (Dutch Top 40)	80
Portugal (AFP)	153
UK Singles (OCC)	77

2025 year-end chart performance for "I Love You, I'm Sorry"
Chart (2025)	Position
Australia (ARIA)	40
Belgium (Ultratop 50 Flanders)	81
Canada (Canadian Hot 100)	78
Global 200 (Billboard)	57
New Zealand (Recorded Music NZ)	49
UK Singles (OCC)	55

== Certifications ==
Certifications for "I Love You, I'm Sorry"
Region	Certification	Certified units/sales
Australia (ARIA)	4× Platinum	280,000^{‡}
Belgium (BRMA)	Platinum	40,000^{‡}
Brazil (Pro-Música Brasil)	Diamond	160,000^{‡}
Canada (Music Canada)	5× Platinum	400,000^{‡}
Denmark (IFPI Danmark)	Gold	45,000^{‡}
France (SNEP)	Gold	100,000^{‡}
New Zealand (RMNZ)	2× Platinum	60,000^{‡}
Poland (ZPAV)	Gold	62,500^{‡}
Portugal (AFP)	Platinum	10,000^{‡}
Spain (Promusicae)	Gold	30,000^{‡}
United Kingdom (BPI)	2× Platinum	1,200,000^{‡}
United States (RIAA)	Gold	500,000^{‡}
Streaming
Greece (IFPI Greece)	Gold	1,000,000^{†}
^{‡} Sales+streaming figures based on certification alone.^{†} Streaming-only figures based on certification alone.

== Release history ==
Release dates and formats for "I Love You, I'm Sorry"
Region	Date	Format	Version	Label	Ref.
Various	June 21, 2024	Digital download; streaming	Original	Interscope	
Various	October 11, 2024	Digital download; streaming	Live from Vevo	Interscope	
