= Audrey Hobert =

American singer-songwriter (born 1999)

- Hobert in 2025

Background information
- Born: Audrey Sandra Hobert; February 19, 1999 (age 27); New York City, U.S.
- Origin: Los Angeles, California, U.S.
- Genres: Pop; indie pop
- Occupations: Singer; songwriter
- Instrument: Guitar
- Years active: 2019–present
- Education: New York University (BFA)
- Relatives: Malcolm Todd (brother)
- Label: RCA
- Website: audreyhobert.net

Audrey Sandra Hobert (/ˈhoʊbərt/ HOH-bərt; born February 19, 1999) is an American singer and songwriter. After she co-wrote several songs with Gracie Abrams and Aaron Dessner (from the National) on Abrams's album The Secret of Us (2024), Hobert released her debut single, "Sue Me", in 2025. Her first album, Who's the Clown?, was released by RCA Records in August 2025. She will open for the European leg of Charli XCX's Music, Fashion, Film Tour in February 2027.

== Life and career ==
Audrey Sandra Hobert was born in New York City and grew up in Los Angeles. Her brother is Malcolm Todd, also a musician. Her father, Tim Hobert, was a writer and producer for Scrubs and The Middle. She went to Palisades Charter High School in Pacific Palisades, Los Angeles.

Audrey Hobert returned to New York as an adult and graduated in 2021 from New York University in Manhattan, with a Bachelor of Fine Arts degree in screenwriting. Afterwards, she worked as a writer's production assistant at Warner Bros. She was a staff writer on every episode of the Nickelodeon sitcom The Really Loud House (2022–2024). The show was executive produced by her father, Tim Hobert, who was also the program's showrunner.

Audrey Hobert then ventured into songwriting, working with close friend Gracie Abrams. The two had met at Abrams's fifth-grade graduation. They co-wrote songs for Abrams's 2024 studio album The Secret of Us. Notably, Hobert co-wrote the international hit song "That's So True", as well as providing backing vocals for it. The track was at the top of the UK singles chart for eight weeks. Hobert has accompanied Abrams in live performances of the song. She also directed the music videos for the album's singles "Risk" and "I Love You, I'm Sorry."

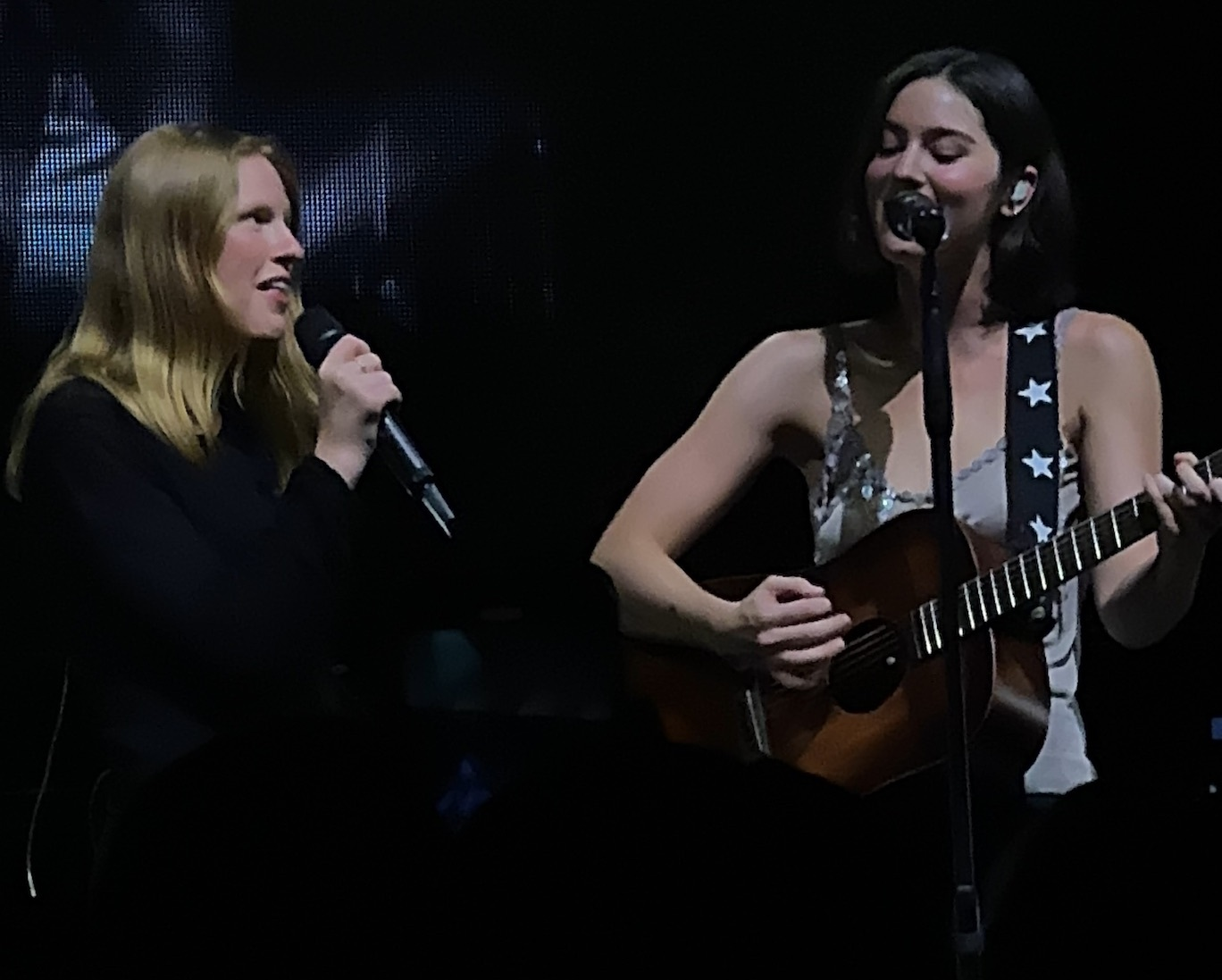
Hobert has written songs with Gracie Abrams.

Hobert signed a publishing deal with Universal Music Group and co-wrote many tracks for other artists, including "Start All Over" for Alessi Rose, an English singer and songwriter, which appeared on Alessi Rose's second EP For Your Validation (2025). Through Universal, Hobert met Ricky Gourmet, who worked on Finneas' second album, For Cryin' Out Loud!. On May 9, 2025, Hobert's debut single, "Sue Me", came out. The song was the fifth song she wrote by herself. In June 2025, she followed it with "Bowling Alley" and performed her first headlining concert. Hobert has cited idiosyncratic writers and performers—including comedians Steve Martin and Nathan Fielder, playwright Annie Baker, and musician Taylor Swift—as formative inspirations for her deadpan humor and narrative-focused songwriting style.

In July 2025, she released the song "Wet Hair" and announced the release of her debut album, Who's the Clown?, which was released in August. She began her first tour The Staircase to Stardom Tour, which started on December 1, 2025 in San Francisco and ended on October 13, 2026, in Oakland. On August 6, 2025, Abrams brought Hobert on stage at a show at the Kia Forum to perform an unreleased song they worked on together, "Minibar". It was recorded about the same time as "That's So True", and later appeared on Abrams' third studio album, Daughter from Hell (2026).

Hobert made her TV debut on October 20, 2025, performing "Sue Me" on The Tonight Show Starring Jimmy Fallon. In November, she was listed on Vevo's "DSCVR Artists to Watch" list for 2026. She appeared on NPR's Tiny Desk Concerts in August 2026.

== Discography ==
=== Studio albums ===
List of studio albums, with selected details
Title	Details	Peak chart positions				
Title	Details	US	AUS	IRE	NZ	UK
Who's the Clown?	Released: August 15, 2025; Label: RCA; Format: CD, LP, digital download, streaming	136	23	65	22	81

=== Singles ===
List of singles, showing year released and album name
Title	Year	Peak chart positions							Certifications	Album
Title	Year	US	US Pop	US Rock	CAN	IRE	NZ Hot	UK	Certifications	Album
"Sue Me"	2025	57	17	—	56	12	13	21	RIAA: Gold; BPI: Silver; MC: Platinum; RMNZ: Gold	Who's the Clown?
"Bowling Alley"	2025	—	—	—	—	—	—	—		Who's the Clown?
"Wet Hair"	2025	—	—	—	—	—	—	—		Who's the Clown?
"Thirst Trap"	2025	—	—	—	—	—	36	—		Who's the Clown?
"Silver Jubilee"	2026	—	—	46	—	77	—	—		Who's the Clown?
"—" denotes releases that did not chart.

=== Songwriting credits ===
List of songwriting credits, with year released and album name
Year	Artist	Song	Album	Notes
2024	Gracie Abrams	"Risk"	The Secret of Us	Co-writer
2024	Gracie Abrams	"Blowing Smoke"	The Secret of Us	Co-writer
2024	Gracie Abrams	"I Love You, I'm Sorry"	The Secret of Us	Co-writer
2024	Gracie Abrams	"Let It Happen"	The Secret of Us	Co-writer
2024	Gracie Abrams	"I Knew It, I Know You"	The Secret of Us	Co-writer
2024	Gracie Abrams	"Normal Thing"	The Secret of Us	Co-writer
2024	Gracie Abrams	"That's So True"	The Secret of Us	Co-writer
2024	Juliet Ivy	"Is It My Face?"	Tiny But Scary	Co-writer
2025	Alessi Rose	"Start All Over"	For Your Validation	Co-writer
2025	Malcolm Todd	"Concrete"	Malcolm Todd	Co-writer
2026	August Ponthier	"Betty"	Everywhere Isn't Texas	Co-writer
2026	Gracie Abrams	"Minibar"	Daughter From Hell	Co-writer

=== Directing credits ===
List of music video directing credits, with year released
Year	Artist	Song
2024	Gracie Abrams	"Risk"
2024	Gracie Abrams	"I Love You, I'm Sorry"
2025	Malcolm Todd	"Concrete"
2025	Self	"Sue Me"
2025	Self	"Bowling Alley"
2025	Self	"Wet Hair"
2025	Self	"Thirst Trap"
2025	Self	"Sex and The City"
2026	Self	“Silver Jubilee”
2026	Self	"Phoebe"

== Tours ==
Headlining

- The Staircase to Stardom Tour (2025–2026)

Supporting

- Charli XCX - Music, Fashion, Film Tour (2027)
