= Minor (EP) =

EP by Gracie Abrams
- Released: July 14, 2020
- Genres: Bedroom pop; electropop; indie folk
- Length: 20:09
- Label: Interscope

Gracie Abrams chronology
Minor (2020)	This Is What It Feels Like (2021)

Singles from Minor
- 1. "21" Released: February 20, 2020; 2. "I Miss You, I'm Sorry" Released: April 8, 2020; 3. "Long Sleeves" Released: May 20, 2020

Minor is the debut extended play (EP) by the American singer-songwriter Gracie Abrams, released on July 14, 2020, by Interscope Records. Abrams co-wrote all the tracks. Production was mainly handled by Blake Slatkin.

== Background ==
Gracie Abrams became interested in playing the piano and songwriting at age eight. She started her career by posting recordings of covers and original songs to Instagram and SoundCloud. On Instagram, she premiered a song titled "Minor" in August 2017, and uploaded a produced version of the song in March 2018. The song gained attention from the New Zealand singer and songwriter Lorde, who told Abrams to send her the MP3 for "Minor". In 2019, Abrams signed with Interscope Records and released her debut single, "Mean It". She also released a full version of "Minor" alongside a lo-fi video on YouTube in 2019. The single was followed by "Stay" in January 2020. Since Abrams began posting music online, she has also attracted the attention of the American singer-songwriter Phoebe Bridgers.

== Writing and production ==
Abrams wrote Minor while in college and experiencing her first breakup, which she felt was something she needed to write about at the time. She described this time as a "very transitional year" for herself. She also said the EP was "very much in response" to the breakup. She wrote the title track at age 17 and it was the first song she wrote where she "immediately recognized that it was just incredibly [her]". The rest of the EP was recorded in one week, which Abrams said was "unintentional but the best week ever". The majority of the EP was completed before the COVID-19 lockdowns. Abrams worked on the EP with her then-boyfriend, Blake Slatkin, who served as its executive producer. Throughout its creation, the two would burn incense and go on walks; Abrams expressed her emotional distress through writing. When titling the song "Tehe", Abrams felt she "overused [the] phrase" when speaking regularly, which led to its title, despite the phrase not appearing in the song; she said it "felt like the obvious choice".

== Composition ==
Minor is a bedroom pop, electropop, and indie folk EP with themes of love, life, and strained friendships. The EP's central focus is on the conclusion of a relationship. NME's Jenessa Williams compared the lyrical themes to the work of Lorde and the darker moments of Selena Gomez's discography. Charlotte Krol of the same website called the EP "seven emotional diary entries transposed to song form from the confines of [Abrams's] bedroom". Pitchfork's Jane Bua identified that the EP was characterized by "diaristic tracks with ashen vocals".

The opening track of Minor is "Friend", which lyrically reflects on emotional disconnect. "21" contains lo-fi thumps reminiscent of a house party, according to Williams. The lyrics of "Tehe" reflect on the aftermath of a broken relationship ("Now I know I wasn't right"). The track also reflects on optimism, using the line, "Should've called it / But we never gave it up." "I Miss You, I'm Sorry" displays Abrams longing over a lost relationship to the point of missing its turbulent parts. Atop a simple piano motif that expands with expressive strings, she sings "I miss fighting in your old apartment / Breaking dishes when you're disappointed." "Long Sleeves" is a ballad that sees Abrams acknowledge she is not ready to love somebody while working on herself. Abrams described as "closure". The final track of Minor is its title track, which shares the frustration of feeling stuck at home. She nearly whispers the lines "I would drive all night to get to you / But my curfew is early and dad's at the door," which Williams felt depicted the transitional period of teenage angst marked by a mix of "know-it-all autonomy and tentative fear".

== Promotion and release ==
The lead single of Minor, "21", was released on February 20, 2020. Minor was announced on May 20, 2020. It was originally meant to be released on June 16, 2020, but was delayed to July 14, 2020 so as not to detract from the Black Lives Matter movement. She was scheduled to perform live for the first time, although it was cancelled due to the COVID-19 pandemic. In September 2020, Abrams performed "Friend" live in her home for Vevo. Abrams first teased "Tehe" in an interview with Coup de Main in early 2020.

== Critical reception ==
Minor was well received. Multiple critics described Minor as Abrams's breakout release. Retrospectively writing about the EP for Pitchfork, Bua criticized it for being "underdeveloped"; she called its production "simple" and its songwriting "promising (but sometimes cliché)". The EP expanded Abrams's fanbase. Williams deemed "21" and "Long Sleeves" standout tracks and felt the EP reflected the conditions of the COVID-19 pandemic well, despite it being completed before the pandemic. Rose Ridell for Coup de Main deemed "Tehe" a highlight. Kroll described "I Miss You, I'm Sorry" as "the most pointed of Abrams['s] heartbreak songs".

== Tour ==
In support of Minor, Abrams scheduled the I've Missed You, I'm Sorry tour. It covered North America and the United Kingdom with 12 selective dates. It started on September 1, 2021, in Santa Ana, California, and concluded on October 21, 2021, in London, England. The tour also supported her singles "Mess It Up" and "Unlearn" with Benny Blanco.

== Aftermath ==
Minor inspired the American singer-songwriter Olivia Rodrigo to write her debut single, "Drivers License". Following the song's release, Rodrigo's record label felt the two should meet, in which Rodrigo replied: "I literally don't think I can meet her. I think I would just evaporate. I'm her biggest fan." "Drivers License" went on to become a widespread commercial success worldwide. Abrams later supported Rodrigo on the Sour Tour throughout 2022.

== Track listing ==
Minor track listing
No.	Title	Writer(s)	Producer(s)	Length
1.	"Friend"	Gracie Abrams; Blake Slatkin; Jim-E Stack	Slatkin; Stack	2:56
2.	"21"	Abrams; Joel Little; Sarah Aarons	Joel Little	3:05
3.	"Under / Over"	Abrams; Jack Karaszewski; Henry Kwapis; Carol Ades; Slatkin	Kwapis; Karaszewski; Slatkin	2:21
4.	"Tehe"	Abrams; Slatkin; Stack; Eli Teplin	Slatkin; Stack	2:42
5.	"I Miss You, I'm Sorry"	Abrams; Aarons	Slatkin	2:47
6.	"Long Sleeves"	Abrams; Slatkin	Slatkin	3:38
7.	"Minor"	Abrams; Slatkin; Benny Blanco	Slatkin; Blanco	2:40
Total length:				20:09

== Personnel ==
- Gracie Abrams – lead vocals (all tracks), songwriting (all tracks)
- Blake Slatkin – production (1, 3–7), songwriting (1, 3–4, 6–7)
- Jim-E Stack – production (1, 3), songwriting (1, 3), drum programming (1, 4), bass (4)
- Joel Little – production (2), songwriting (2)
- Jack Karaszewski – production (3), songwriting (3)
- Henry Kwapis – production (3), songwriting (3)
- Sarah Aarons – songwriting (2, 5)
- Carol Ades – songwriting (3, 5)
- Eli Teplin – songwriting (4), keyboard (4)
- Benny Blanco – production (7), songwriting (7)
- Rob Moose – strings (5), cello (6), piano (6), viola (6), violin (6)

== Charts ==
Chart performance for Minor
Chart (2020–2025)	Peak position
Austrian Albums (Ö3 Austria)	74
Belgian Albums (Ultratop Flanders)	3
Belgian Albums (Ultratop Wallonia)	32
Dutch Albums (Album Top 100)	6
German Albums (Offizielle Top 100)	14
Polish Albums (ZPAV)	94
Portuguese Albums (AFP)	77
Scottish Albums (Official Charts)	5
Swiss Albums (Schweizer Hitparade)	39
UK Albums (Official Charts)	51
US Top Album Sales (Billboard)	23

== Certifications ==
Certifications for Minor
Region	Certification	Certified units/sales
Canada (Music Canada)	Gold	40,000^{‡}
New Zealand (RMNZ)	Gold	7,500^{‡}
^{‡} Sales+streaming figures based on certification alone.

== Release history ==
Release history and formats for Minor
Region	Date	Format(s)	Label
Various	July 14, 2020	Digital download; streaming	Interscope
Various	October 16, 2020	LP	Interscope
Various	July 14, 2025	CD; cassette	Interscope
