= Close to You (Gracie Abrams song) =

Single by Gracie Abrams

from the album The Secret of Us
- A-side: "Risk"
- Released: June 7, 2024
- Recorded: 2017–2024
- Genre: Synth-pop
- Length: 3:45
- Label: Interscope
- Songwriters: Gracie Abrams; Sam de Jong
- Producers: Gracie Abrams; Sam de Jong

Gracie Abrams singles chronology
"Risk" (2024)	"Close to You" (2024)	"I Love You, I'm Sorry" (2024)

Lyric video
- "Close to You" on YouTube

"Close to You" is a song recorded by American singer-songwriter Gracie Abrams for her second studio album, The Secret of Us (2024). The song was released through Interscope Records on June 7, 2024, as the second single from the album, after it was issued as a B-side of the lead single "Risk" in its 7-inch format on May 31. Written and produced by Abrams and Sam de Jong, "Close to You" is an upbeat synth-pop track with lyrics about a declaration of love and lust.

Upon its release, "Close to You" became Abrams' first solo entry on the US Billboard Hot 100 and peaked within the top 40 in Australia, Canada, Ireland, New Zealand, Singapore, and the United Kingdom. It received a platinum certification in the former country. Abrams performed "Close to You" on The Today Show and included it as part of the set list to The Secret of Us Tour (2024–2025) and Taylor Swift's The Eras Tour (2024).

== Background and release ==
"Close to You" was first posted as a 20-second snippet on Gracie Abrams's Instagram account in 2017, and was never originally intended to be officially released. She shared another preview in the following year. At a concert in 2023, Abrams confirmed that the album's sound she was working on did not match "Close to You", but explained: "Maybe we find a one-off situation where we can get it out there". At the beginning of 2024, she shared on TikTok a demo of the then-unreleased song, and went viral on the platform. After a good reception from fans, Abrams decided to finish the track and include it on her next album, and said: "I'm really grateful for the encouragement from everyone online who let me know they still want to hear [the] song after all this time".

Abrams announced her second studio album, The Secret of Us, on April 29, 2024, subsequently revealing that she would be releasing "Risk" as the lead single on May 1. Following the song's release, Abrams revealed the track listing of the album via social media on May 13, 2024, which included "Close to You" as the thirteenth song. She explained that "Close to You" was initially not part of the album: "It's from a different time entirely, we had finished the whole record top to bottom, but I heard you loud and clear". It was released as the B-side of "Risk" in its 7-inch format on May 31. Abrams announced the release of "Close to You" as the second single from the album on June 5, 2024, along with the dates of her then-upcoming fourth concert tour, the Secret of Us Tour.

== Music and lyrics ==
"Close to You" is an upbeat synth-pop song. Its radio-friendly sound was compared by Billboard's Andrew Untererger to the Pure Heroine-era Lorde and 1989-era Taylor Swift, and its lyrics are a "declaration of love and lust".

== Commercial performance ==
"Close to You" peaked at number 49 on the US Billboard Hot 100; it marked her first solo entry on the chart. The song debuted at number 35 on the UK Singles Chart published by the Official Charts Company, becoming her first top 40 single in the United Kingdom. It also reached the top 40 in Australia, Canada, Ireland, New Zealand, and Singapore.

== Live performances ==
Abrams performed "Close to You" on The Today Show on June 28, 2024, one week after the release of The Secret of Us. She included "Close to You" in the regular set list to The Secret of Us Tour, where she performs it as the last song of the concert. She also performed it as part of her opening act for the last leg to Swift's The Eras Tour.

== In other media ==
The song is featured in the final episode of the fourth season of the American television series Emily in Paris, which premiered on September 12, 2024. It was also featured in the trailer for the Netflix TV series Nobody Wants This.

== Charts ==
=== Weekly charts ===
Weekly chart performance for "Close to You"
Chart (2024–2025)	Peak position
Australia (ARIA)	34
Canada Hot 100 (Billboard)	40
Canada AC (Billboard)	15
Canada CHR/Top 40 (Billboard)	19
Canada Hot AC (Billboard)	29
Global 200 (Billboard)	59
Ireland (IRMA)	10
Netherlands (Single Tip)	10
New Zealand (Recorded Music NZ)	31
Portugal (AFP)	183
Singapore (RIAS)	26
Sweden Heatseeker (Sverigetopplistan)	7
UK Singles (Official Charts)	31
US Billboard Hot 100	49
US Pop Airplay (Billboard)	17

=== Yearly charts ===
Year-end chart performance for "Close to You"
Chart (2025)	Position
Canada AC (Billboard)	46
Canada CHR/Top 40 (Billboard)	60
Canada Hot AC (Billboard)	75

== Certifications ==
Certifications for "Close to You"
Region	Certification	Certified units/sales
Australia (ARIA)	2× Platinum	140,000^{‡}
Belgium (BRMA)	Gold	20,000^{‡}
Brazil (Pro-Música Brasil)	Platinum	40,000^{‡}
Canada (Music Canada)	3× Platinum	240,000^{‡}
New Zealand (RMNZ)	Platinum	30,000^{‡}
Portugal (AFP)	Gold	5,000^{‡}
United Kingdom (BPI)	Platinum	600,000^{‡}
^{‡} Sales+streaming figures based on certification alone.

== Release history ==
Release date and format for "Close to You"
Region	Date	Format	Label	Ref.
United States	August 23, 2024	Contemporary hit radio	Interscope	
