= The Secret of Us =

- Standard edition cover

Studio album by Gracie Abrams
- Released: June 21, 2024
- Recorded: 2022–2024
- Studios: Long Pond (Hudson Valley); Electric Lady Studios (New York City)
- Genre: Pop
- Length: 47:33
- Label: Interscope
- Producers: Gracie Abrams; Aaron Dessner; Sam de Jong; Taylor Swift; Jack Antonoff

Gracie Abrams chronology
Good Riddance (2023)	The Secret of Us (2024)	Daughter from Hell (2026)

Singles from The Secret of Us
- 1. "Risk" Released: May 1, 2024; 2. "Close to You" Released: June 7, 2024; 3. "I Love You, I'm Sorry" Released: October 11, 2024

Singles from The Secret of Us (Deluxe)
- 1. "That's So True" Released: November 6, 2024

The Secret of Us is the second studio album by American singer-songwriter Gracie Abrams, released on June 21, 2024, by Interscope Records. It was produced by Abrams herself, along with American musician Aaron Dessner, whom she had first collaborated with on her debut studio album, Good Riddance (2023). Abrams wrote most of the songs with either Dessner or her frequent co-writer Audrey Hobert. Musically, The Secret of Us is a pop record that contains elements of country pop, indie pop, and folk music.

Two singles—"Risk" and "Close to You"—preceded the album's release. "I Love You, I'm Sorry" was released as the third single in October 2024. American singer-songwriter Taylor Swift, who is often cited by Abrams as an artistic influence, appears on the track "Us" as a featured guest.

The Secret of Us topped the charts in Australia, Canada, the Netherlands, Scotland, and the United Kingdom. In the United States, the album debuted at number two on the Billboard 200, becoming her first top 10 album. To support the album, Abrams embarked on her fourth concert tour, the Secret of Us Tour, in September 2024. The deluxe edition of The Secret of Us was released on October 18, 2024, alongside the single "That's So True", which topped the UK Singles Chart. Following this, in July 2025 she started her second leg of the North American leg, calling it "The Secret of Us Deluxe Tour".

== Background ==
On February 24, 2023, Gracie Abrams released her debut studio album, Good Riddance. It received generally positive reviews from music critics, with praise towards its lyrical vulnerability and the artistic growth shown by Abrams from her previous works. Abrams received a nomination for Best New Artist at the 2024 Grammy Awards. From April to August 2023, she served as the opening act for select dates on the North American leg of the Eras Tour by Taylor Swift. Abrams said that opening on the Eras Tour "informed so much about how I went about writing this next album", and expressed her admiration for the artist. Abrams began working on The Secret of Us while touring with Swift.

In an interview with Vogue published on March 7, 2024, Abrams confirmed that she would be releasing new music later that year. On April 27, 2024, the singer began teasing new music on Instagram. Media publications interpreted that the images posted by Abrams would be part of an upcoming new music video. The Secret of Us was announced on April 29 via her social media accounts. Prior to the album's release, Abrams teased a possible deluxe edition to the American magazine Billboard.

== Release and promotion ==
"Risk" was the first single to be released from The Secret of Us on May 1, 2024. It was co-written by Abrams and Audrey Hobert with production by frequent collaborator Aaron Dessner of the National who had also produced Good Riddance. The music video for "Risk" was directed by Hobert and features Abrams getting drunk on wine and stalking a crush. Abrams performed "Risk" on The Tonight Show Starring Jimmy Fallon on May 8, 2024.

Following the album's announcement, Abrams revealed the track listing via social media on May 13, 2024. The track listing revealed that the album would include a collaboration with the American singer-songwriter Taylor Swift on "Us", the fifth track. On June 3, 2024, Abrams announced that she will embarking on her fourth headlining concert tour, the Secret of Us Tour. The North American dates will contain 23 shows, beginning on September 5 and ending on October 10. American singer-songwriter Role Model will serve as an opening act.

On June 4, 2024, Abrams announced the second single from the album would be "Close to You", released on June 7. The song was originally released as a 20-second snippet 7 years prior. She revealed it was not initially supposed to be on the album, but revisited the song due to how much her fans cared about it. Abrams performed the single alongside "Let It Happen" on Jimmy Kimmel Live! on June 20.

On June 23, 2024, during the third night of Swift's The Eras Tour at Wembley Stadium in London, Abrams and Swift performed "Us" live for the first time as a surprise song. The performance, part of the show's acoustic set, featured Abrams on piano and Swift on guitar. On July 15, Abrams announced that the Secret of Us Tour would be coming to Europe in 2025; it will contain 18 shows, beginning on February 9 and concluding on March 12. A music video for the track "I Love You, I'm Sorry" was released on July 17. A deluxe edition of The Secret of Us was released on October 18, 2024, including four new tracks and three live recordings. "That's So True" was released as a single and topped the UK Singles Chart, becoming Abrams' first number-one in the country.

== Music and lyrics ==
The album's production involves Abrams, Aaron Dessner, and Audrey Hobert, with contributions from Taylor Swift and Jack Antonoff, reflecting a mature and multifaceted soundscape. According to Elise Ryan from the Associated Press, the album's lead single "Risk" is characterized by its "frenetic and melancholic" atmosphere, with Abrams' vocals growing more intense as the production thickens.

Musically, The Secret of Us is a pop album influenced by country pop, indie pop, and folk music. It drew comparisons to Taylor Swift's 2020 albums Folklore and Evermore, as well as Phoebe Bridgers' work, incorporating folk-pop elements with a modern twist. Mylrea also drew parallels to Lorde's Melodrama (2017), noting that tracks like "Normal Thing" and "Close to You" feature subdued synths and percolating beats, hinting at dancefloor euphoria without fully committing to it. The album's production often mimics the visceral emotions of the lyrics, creating a cohesive sonic narrative.

Hannah Mylrea from NME described the album as bringing a "new intimacy", where Abrams is "crying on the dancefloor and sharing her inner thoughts with her closest pals in the smoking area".

== Critical reception ==
Professional ratings
Aggregate scores
Source	Rating
AnyDecentMusic?	7.2/10
Metacritic	80/100
Review scores
Source	Rating
AllMusic	3.5/5 stars
Clash	7/10
The Daily Telegraph	4/5 stars
Dork	4/5 stars
Hot Press	9/10
NME	4/5 stars
Rolling Stone	4/5 stars
Slant Magazine	3/5 stars

Upon release, The Secret of Us received positive reviews from music critics. According to the review aggregator Metacritic, The Secret of Us received "generally favorable reviews" based on a weighted average score of 80 out of 100 from seven critic scores. The review aggregator site AnyDecentMusic? compiled seven reviews and gave the album an average of 7.2 out of 10, based on their assessment of the critical consensus.

Dana Poland of Slant Magazine described the album as a "truly great pop album" and stated that it "offers glimpses into the singer's interior world", although it "lacks dimension". NME's Hannah Mylrea said that Abrams "embraces her growing pains and celebrates enduring the difficult moments" and ended her review by saying that she "[has] never sounded better". The staff of Clash found the album "a unique sound somewhere between Phoebe Bridgers and Taylor Swift" and wrote that "the experience of touring, which she didn't have at the release of her debut, is clearly heard in her bolder and more open delivery". The Daily Telegraph's Neil McCormick said that the lyrics are "rooted in the confessional, as she takes on heartbreak, growing pains and online trolls", while comparing them to the works of Swift and American singers Billie Eilish and Olivia Rodrigo. Neive McCarthy wrote for Dork that The Secret of Us showcases "a refreshingly new side" to Abrams, who is "at her strongest".

Critics' year-end rankings of The Secret of Us
Publication	List	Rank	Ref.
ALBUMISM	The 50 Best Albums of 2024	—	
Billboard	The 50 Best Albums of 2024	16	
Chorus.fm	Top 30 Albums of 2024	28	
The Forty-Five	2024 Albums of the Year	14	
Hot Press	50 Best Albums of 2024	48	
HuffPost	The Best Albums Of 2024	—	
Vogue	The 36 Best Albums of 2024	—	

== Commercial performance ==
In the United States, The Secret of Us debuted at number two on the Billboard 200 with 89,000 album-equivalent units, becoming her first top 10 and highest-charting album. In the United Kingdom, The Secret of Us debuted at number one on the UK Albums Chart with 22,883 units, becoming her first number-one album on the chart. The album also debuted atop the music charts on various countries including Australia, Netherlands and Scotland.

== Track listing ==
Standard edition
No.	Title	Writer(s)	Producer(s)	Length
1.	"Felt Good About You"	Gracie Abrams; Aaron Dessner	Abrams; Dessner	2:44
2.	"Risk"	Abrams; Audrey Hobert	Abrams; Dessner	3:11
3.	"Blowing Smoke"	Abrams; Hobert; Dessner	Abrams; Dessner	3:52
4.	"I Love You, I'm Sorry"	Abrams; Hobert; Dessner	Abrams; Dessner	2:37
5.	"Us" (featuring Taylor Swift)	Abrams; Swift; Dessner	Abrams; Swift; Dessner; Jack Antonoff	4:02
6.	"Let It Happen"	Abrams; Hobert; Dessner	Abrams; Dessner	4:20
7.	"Tough Love"	Abrams; Dessner	Abrams; Dessner	2:49
8.	"I Knew It, I Know You"	Abrams; Hobert	Abrams; Dessner	4:12
9.	"Gave You I Gave You I"	Abrams; Dessner	Abrams; Dessner	4:29
10.	"Normal Thing"	Abrams; Hobert; Dessner	Abrams; Dessner	4:02
11.	"Good Luck Charlie"	Abrams; Dessner	Abrams; Dessner	3:56
12.	"Free Now"	Abrams; Dessner	Abrams; Dessner	3:34
13.	"Close to You"	Abrams; Sam de Jong	Abrams; de Jong	3:45
Total length:				47:33

Deluxe edition
No.	Title	Writer(s)	Producer(s)	Length
14.	"Cool"	Abrams; Dessner	Abrams; Dessner	3:49
15.	"That's So True"	Abrams; Hobert	Abrams; Dessner; Julian Bunetta	2:46
16.	"I Told You Things"	Abrams; Dessner	Abrams; Dessner	3:41
17.	"Packing It Up"	Abrams; Dessner	Abrams; Dessner	2:44
Total length:				60:33

=== Notes ===
- Although being included on all LP editions of the standard release, some original pressings do not have "Close to You" printed in the track listing.
- Digital deluxe edition includes the live recordings of "I Love You, I'm Sorry", "I Knew It, I Know You" and "Free Now" from Vevo as tracks 18-20. They are also featured on the anniversary LP release.
- Japanese deluxe edition includes the Vevo live recordings, as well as live recording of "That's So True" from Radio City Music Hall as track 21.

== Personnel ==
Musicians

- Gracie Abrams – vocals (all tracks), acoustic guitar (2, 3, 8, 13), piano (5, 14), keyboards (9, 13), clapping (3), percussion (4)
- Aaron Dessner – piano (2–7, 10, 15–17), synthesizer (2–10, 12, 14–17), synthesizer programming (4, 6, 7, 9, 10, 12), drum programming (1–7, 9, 10, 12, 14–16), programming (14), electric guitar (1–10, 12, 14, 16), acoustic guitar (1–11, 15–17), Mellotron (5, 6, 9, 14, 16–17), bass (1–4, 6–9, 11, 12, 16), percussion (1–4, 6, 11, 12), mandolin (5), synth bass (2, 3), Moog bass (10, 12, 14), banjo (1), drums (2, 4, 6, 15–16), shaker (15–16)
- Andrew Barr – drums (1–3, 6, 7, 11, 12, 14), tom-toms (6, 7)
- James McAlister – programming (1, 3, 5, 6), piano (11), synth bass (1), synthesizer (1–4, 6–10, 14–16), electric guitar (3, 6, 7, 14), Moog bass (6, 7, 17), drum programming (2–6, 9, 10, 14–16), percussion (6, 7), conga (4) sound effects (2–6, 9, 11, 12), samples (12), synthesizer programming (3, 4, 6), vocal programming (6, 9, 12), acoustic guitar (14), shaker (14), snare drum (16), vibraphone (16)
- Rob Moose – violin (1, 4–6, 8, 10), viola (1, 4–6, 8, 10), piano (8), strings contractor (4)
- Audrey Hobert – background vocals (2–4, 6, 8, 15)
- Maryam Qudus – synthesizer (2, 8)
- Justin Vernon – electric guitar (3, 7, 12), synthesizer (6, 12), vocal programming (9), background vocals (11, 16); piano, Wurlitzer (11)
- Jack Antonoff – programming, acoustic guitar, cello, drums, electric guitar, Mellotron, percussion, synthesizer (5)
- Taylor Swift – vocals (5)
- Benjamin Lanz – synthesizer (6, 15), trombone (9)
- Brad Barr – guitar (9)
- Kyle Resnick – trumpet (9)
- Sam de Jong – programming, bass, drums, guitar, keyboards (13)
- Julian Bunetta – bass, drums, guitar, keyboards, programming (15)
- Cooper Cowgill – bass, conductor (18–20)
- Gabe Smith – drums (18, 20), guitar (18–20)
- Elle Pluckett – guitar (18–20)
- Tyler McCarthy – guitar (18–20)
- Casey Kalmenson – keyboards, conductor (18–20)
- Morgan Paros – violin (18–20)

Technical

- Randy Merrill – mastering
- Serban Ghenea – mixing (1–17)
- Michael Matta – mixing (18–20)
- Bryce Bordon – mix engineering (1–13), mixing assistance (14–16)
- Bella Blasko – engineering (1–12, 14–16)
- Rob Moose – engineering (1, 4–7, 10)
- James McAlister – engineering (2–6, 9–12, 14–16)
- Jonathan Low – engineering (5, 12)
- Laura Sisk – engineering (5)
- Benjamin Lanz – engineering (6, 15)
- Aaron Dessner – engineering (9)
- John Rooney – engineering (13)
- Andrew Barr – engineering (14)
- Vinnie Ferra – engineering (18–20)
- Austin Christy – assistant recording engineering (13)
- Maryam Qudus – additional engineering (1–3, 7, 8, 10, 12)
- Justin Vernon – engineering (6, 7, 9, 11, 12), additional engineering (3)
- Jack Manning – additional engineering (5)
- Oli Jacobs – additional engineering (5)
- Beau Sorenson – additional engineering (11, 12)

== Charts ==
=== Weekly charts ===
Weekly chart performance for The Secret of Us
Chart (2024–2025)	Peak position
Australian Albums (ARIA)	1
Austrian Albums (Ö3 Austria)	4
Belgian Albums (Ultratop Flanders)	2
Belgian Albums (Ultratop Wallonia)	11
Canadian Albums (Billboard)	1
Croatian International Albums (HDU)	6
Danish Albums (Hitlisten)	5
Dutch Albums (Album Top 100)	1
Finnish Albums (Suomen virallinen lista)	16
French Albums (SNEP)	18
German Albums (Offizielle Top 100)	4
Greek Albums (IFPI)	12
Hungarian Albums (MAHASZ)	9
Icelandic Albums (Tónlistinn)	18
Irish Albums (Official Charts)	2
Italian Albums (FIMI)	27
Japanese Hot Albums (Billboard Japan)	94
Lithuanian Albums (AGATA)	30
New Zealand Albums (RMNZ)	1
Norwegian Albums (VG-lista)	3
Polish Albums (ZPAV)	27
Portuguese Albums (AFP)	5
Scottish Albums (Official Charts)	1
Spanish Albums (Promusicae)	5
Swedish Albums (Sverigetopplistan)	8
Swiss Albums (Schweizer Hitparade)	5
UK Albums (Official Charts)	1
US Billboard 200	2

=== Year-end charts ===
Year-end chart performance for The Secret of Us
Chart (2024)	Position
Australian Albums (ARIA)	20
Austrian Albums (Ö3 Austria)	47
Belgian Albums (Ultratop Flanders)	16
Danish Albums (Hitlisten)	94
Dutch Albums (Album Top 100)	11
French Albums (SNEP)	196
German Albums (Offizielle Top 100)	62
Hungarian Albums (MAHASZ)	90
Swiss Albums (Schweizer Hitparade)	83
New Zealand Albums (RMNZ)	20
UK Albums (OCC)	42
US Billboard 200	150

Year-end chart performance for The Secret of Us
Chart (2025)	Position
Australian Albums (ARIA)	7
Austrian Albums (Ö3 Austria)	39
Belgian Albums (Ultratop Flanders)	12
Belgian Albums (Ultratop Wallonia)	132
Canadian Albums (Billboard)	6
Danish Albums (Hitlisten)	35
Dutch Albums (Album Top 100)	8
French Albums (SNEP)	102
German Albums (Offizielle Top 100)	7
Hungarian Albums (MAHASZ)	56
New Zealand Albums (RMNZ)	13
Spanish Albums (PROMUSICAE)	56
Swedish Albums (Sverigetopplistan)	67
Swiss Albums (Schweizer Hitparade)	76
UK Albums (OCC)	30
US Billboard 200	15

== Certifications ==
Certifications for The Secret of Us
Region	Certification	Certified units/sales
Australia (ARIA)	Platinum	70,000^{‡}
Belgium (BRMA)	2× Platinum	40,000^{‡}
Brazil (Pro-Música Brasil)	Gold	20,000^{‡}
Brazil (Pro-Música Brasil) Deluxe	Platinum	40,000^{‡}
Canada (Music Canada)	3× Platinum	240,000^{‡}
Denmark (IFPI Danmark)	Platinum	20,000^{‡}
France (SNEP)	Gold	50,000^{‡}
Germany (BVMI)	Gold	75,000^{‡}
Italy (FIMI)	Gold	25,000^{‡}
New Zealand (RMNZ)	2× Platinum	30,000^{‡}
Poland (ZPAV)	Gold	15,000^{‡}
Portugal (AFP)	Platinum	7,000^{‡}
Spain (Promusicae)	Gold	20,000^{‡}
United Kingdom (BPI)	Platinum	300,000^{‡}
^{‡} Sales+streaming figures based on certification alone.

== Release history ==
Release dates and formats for The Secret of Us
Region	Date	Format(s)	Edition	Label	Ref.
Various	June 21, 2024	CD; digital download; streaming; vinyl LP	Standard	Interscope	
Various	October 18, 2024	CD; digital download; streaming; vinyl LP	Deluxe	Interscope	
Japan	March 14, 2025	CD	Deluxe (Japan)	Universal Japan	
