= That's So True =

Single by Gracie Abrams

from the album The Secret of Us (Deluxe)
- Released: November 6, 2024
- Recorded: 2023
- Genre: Folk-pop
- Length: 2:46
- Label: Interscope
- Songwriters: Gracie Abrams; Audrey Hobert
- Producers: Gracie Abrams; Aaron Dessner; Julian Bunetta

Gracie Abrams singles chronology
"I Love You, I'm Sorry" (2024)	"That's So True" (2024)	"Call Me When You Break Up" (2025)

Lyric video
- "That's So True" on YouTube

"That's So True" is a song by American singer-songwriter Gracie Abrams. It was released through Interscope Records on November 6, 2024, as a single from the deluxe edition of her second studio album, The Secret of Us (2024). Abrams wrote the song alongside frequent collaborator Audrey Hobert, with production handled by the former, Aaron Dessner, and Julian Bunetta.

"That's So True" peaked at number six on the Billboard Hot 100. It also became Abrams's first number one song on the Pop Airplay chart. Outside of the United States, "That's So True" topped the charts in multiple countries such as Australia, Belgium (Flanders), Canada, Ireland, Lebanon, the Netherlands, New Zealand, Norway, and the United Kingdom. It also reached the top ten in eleven additional countries and reached number four on the Billboard Global 200. It is certified Gold or higher in sixteen countries including Diamond in France. It has 1.9 billion streams on Spotify. It is Abrams's biggest hit to date internationally.

At the APRA Music Awards of 2026, the song was nominated for Most Performed International Work.

== Background and promotion ==
The song was debuted at The Academy at Universal Music, Toronto, Ontario, Canada on May 21, 2024. Following this, on June 21, 2024, Abrams released her second studio album, The Secret of Us, her most commercially successful album to date. Following the release of the single "I Love You, I'm Sorry" on October 11, Abrams announced the deluxe version of the album with four additional tracks, including "That's So True", and three live recordings just three days ahead of its release on October 18. The folk-pop track was officially released as a single on November 6, 2024, as a live performance from Radio City Music Hall.

The release date coincided with the kick-off of Taylor Swift's final tour dates of her The Eras Tour, all of which saw Abrams as the opening act and include "That's So True" as the fourth song. She had previously performed the song for the first time during her own The Secret of Us Tour on September 9 in Los Angeles. Shortly after its release, the song peaked within the top 10 of the Billboard Hot 100, and the top of the charts in Ireland and the United Kingdom.

== Track listing ==
- Digital download and streaming (Live from Radio City Music Hall)
1. "That's So True" (live from Radio City Music Hall)
2. "That's So True"

The Apple Music release additionally includes the performance and the lyric video for "That's So True".

== Personnel ==
- Gracie Abrams – vocals, songwriter, producer
- Aaron Dessner – producer, acoustic guitar, drum programming, drums, piano, shaker, synthesizer
- Julian Bunetta – producer, bass, drum programming, guitar, keyboards, programming
- James McAllister – drums, synthesizer, engineering
- Benjamin Lanz – synthesizer, engineering
- Audrey Hobert – songwriter, background vocals
- Serban Ghenea – mixing
- Randy Merrill – mastering
- Bryce Bordone – mixing assistance
- Bella Blasko – engineering

== Charts ==
=== Weekly charts ===
Weekly chart performance for "That's So True"
Chart (2024–2025)	Peak position
Australia (ARIA)	1
Austria (Ö3 Austria Top 40)	2
Belgium (Ultratop 50 Flanders)	1
Belgium (Ultratop 50 Wallonia)	6
Brazil International Pop Airplay (Crowley Charts)	7
Canada Hot 100 (Billboard)	1
Canada All-Format Airplay (Billboard)	1
Canada AC (Billboard)	3
Canada CHR/Top 40 (Billboard)	1
Canada Hot AC (Billboard)	2
CIS Airplay (TopHit)	31
Croatia International Airplay (Top lista)	4
Czech Republic Airplay (ČNS IFPI)	1
Czech Republic Singles Digital (ČNS IFPI)	6
Denmark (Tracklisten)	6
Estonia Airplay (TopHit)	2
Finland (Suomen virallinen lista)	18
France (SNEP)	19
Germany (GfK)	2
Global 200 (Billboard)	4
Greece International (IFPI)	61
Hungary (Editors' Choice Top 40)	11
Hungary (Single Top 40)	17
India International Streaming (IMI)	13
Indonesia (ASIRI)	18
Ireland (IRMA)	1
Israel (Mako Hitlist)	36
Italy (FIMI)	18
Japan Hot Overseas (Billboard Japan)	3
Latvia Streaming (LaIPA)	7
Lebanon (Lebanese Top 20)	1
Lithuania (AGATA)	14
Luxembourg (Billboard)	3
Malaysia International (RIM)	5
Malta Airplay (Radiomonitor)	7
Netherlands (Dutch Top 40)	2
Netherlands (Single Top 100)	1
New Zealand (Recorded Music NZ)	1
North Macedonia Airplay (Radiomonitor)	3
Norway (VG-lista)	1
Philippines (Philippines Hot 100)	11
Poland (Polish Airplay Top 100)	13
Poland (Polish Streaming Top 100)	23
Portugal (AFP)	5
Puerto Rico Airplay (Monitor Latino)	7
Romania Airplay (TopHit)	48
Singapore (RIAS)	3
Slovakia Airplay (ČNS IFPI)	3
Slovakia Singles Digital (ČNS IFPI)	12
Slovenia Airplay (Radiomonitor)	3
Spain (PROMUSICAE)	45
Sweden (Sverigetopplistan)	2
Switzerland (Schweizer Hitparade)	2
UK Singles (Official Charts)	1
US Billboard Hot 100	6
US Adult Contemporary (Billboard)	11
US Adult Pop Airplay (Billboard)	1
US Dance Airplay (Billboard)	34
US Pop Airplay (Billboard)	1

=== Monthly charts ===
Monthly chart performance for "That's So True"
Chart (2024–2025)	Peak position
CIS Airplay (TopHit)	33
Estonia Airplay (TopHit)	8
Lithuania Airplay (TopHit)	10
Romania Airplay (TopHit)	61
Slovakia (Rádio Top 100)	17

=== Year-end charts ===
2024 year-end chart performance for "That's So True"
Chart (2024)	Position
Australia (ARIA)	92
Netherlands (Dutch Top 40)	75

2025 year-end chart performance for "That's So True"
Chart (2025)	Position
Argentina Anglo Airplay (Monitor Latino)	69
Australia (ARIA)	4
Austria (Ö3 Austria Top 40)	11
Belgium (Ultratop 50 Flanders)	4
Belgium (Ultratop 50 Wallonia)	17
Canada (Canadian Hot 100)	6
Canada AC (Billboard)	16
Canada CHR/Top 40 (Billboard)	3
Canada Hot AC (Billboard)	13
CIS Airplay (TopHit)	92
Denmark (Tracklisten)	36
Estonia Airplay (TopHit)	188
France (SNEP)	85
Germany (GfK)	8
Global 200 (Billboard)	7
Hungary (Single Top 40)	83
Iceland (Tónlistinn)	72
Italy (FIMI)	82
Lithuania Airplay (TopHit)	13
Netherlands (Dutch Top 40)	36
Netherlands (Single Top 100)	18
New Zealand (Recorded Music NZ)	13
Philippines (Philippines Hot 100)	58
Poland (Polish Airplay Top 100)	99
Romania Airplay (TopHit)	158
Sweden (Sverigetopplistan)	17
Switzerland (Schweizer Hitparade)	12
UK Singles (OCC)	6
US Billboard Hot 100	14
US Adult Contemporary (Billboard)	17
US Adult Pop Airplay (Billboard)	10
US Pop Airplay (Billboard)	10

== Certifications ==
Certifications for "That's So True"
Region	Certification	Certified units/sales
Australia (ARIA)	7× Platinum	490,000^{‡}
Austria (IFPI Austria)	2× Platinum	60,000^{‡}
Belgium (BRMA)	2× Platinum	80,000^{‡}
Brazil (Pro-Música Brasil)	2× Diamond	320,000^{‡}
Canada (Music Canada)	7× Platinum	560,000^{‡}
Denmark (IFPI Danmark)	Platinum	90,000^{‡}
France (SNEP)	Diamond	333,333^{‡}
Germany (BVMI)	Platinum	600,000^{‡}
Italy (FIMI)	Platinum	200,000^{‡}
New Zealand (RMNZ)	4× Platinum	120,000^{‡}
Poland (ZPAV)	Platinum	125,000^{‡}
Portugal (AFP)	3× Platinum	30,000^{‡}
Spain (Promusicae)	Platinum	60,000^{‡}
Switzerland (IFPI Switzerland)	Platinum	30,000^{‡}
United Kingdom (BPI)	3× Platinum	1,800,000^{‡}
Streaming
Central America (CFC)	Gold	3,500,000^{†}
Greece (IFPI Greece)	Platinum	2,000,000^{†}
^{‡} Sales+streaming figures based on certification alone.^{†} Streaming-only figures based on certification alone.

== Release history ==
Release date and format for "That's So True"
Region	Date	Format	Version	Label	Ref.
Various	October 18, 2024	Digital download; streaming	Original	Interscope	
Various	November 6, 2024	Digital download; streaming	Live from Radio City Music Hall	Interscope	
Italy	November 28, 2024	Radio airplay	Original	EMI	
Various	February 7, 2025	7"	Original; Live	Interscope	
