= Gracie Abrams =

American singer and songwriter (born 1999)

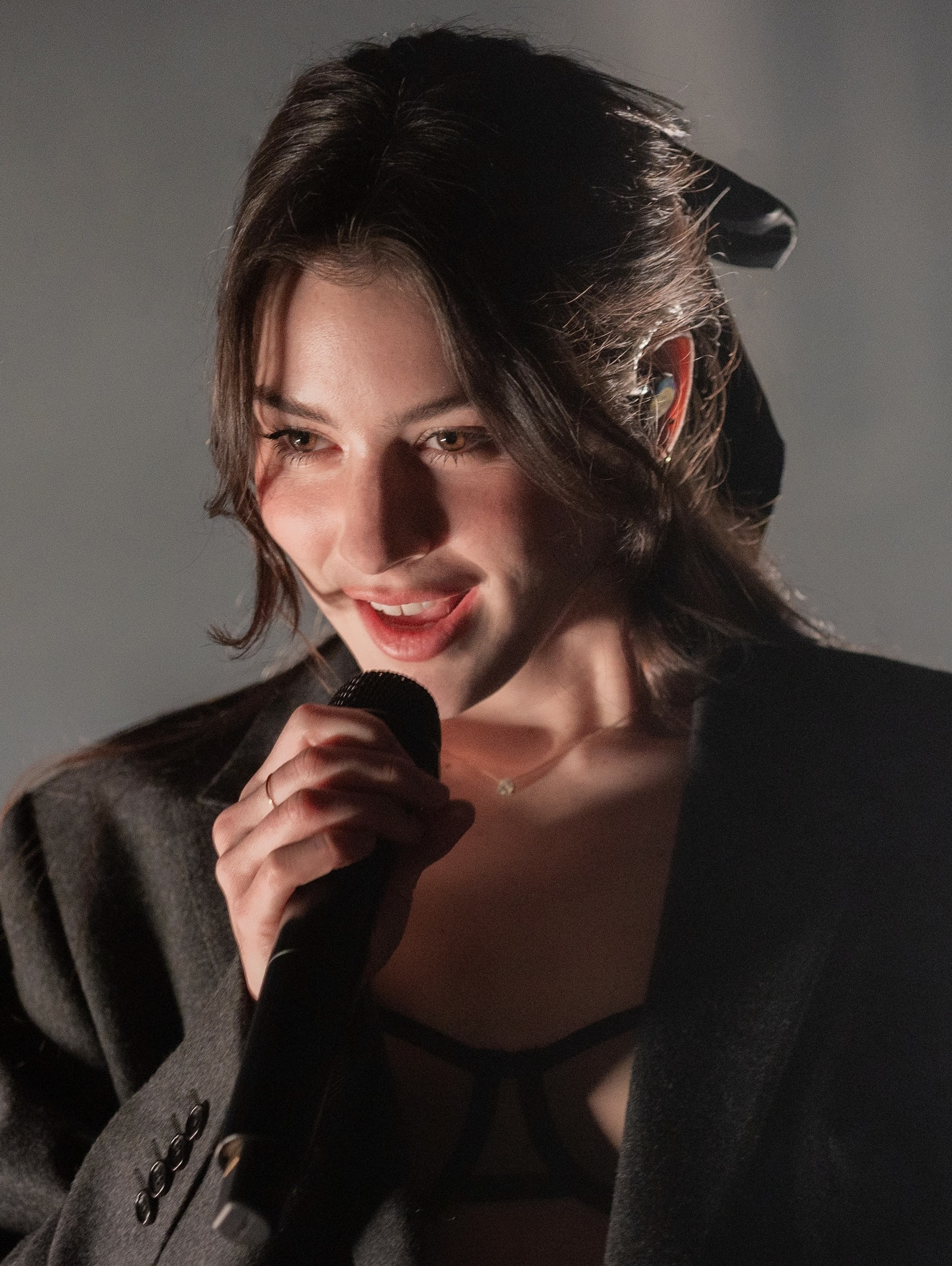
- Abrams in 2022

Background information
- Born: Gracie Madigan Abrams; September 7, 1999 (age 27); Los Angeles, California, U.S.
- Genres: Pop; bedroom pop; folk-pop; indie pop; indie folk
- Occupations: Singer; songwriter
- Instruments: Vocals; guitar; piano
- Works: Discography
- Years active: 2017–present
- Father: J. J. Abrams
- Relatives: Gerald W. Abrams (grandfather); Carol Ann Abrams (grandmother)
- Label: Interscope
- Website: gracieabrams.com

Gracie Madigan Abrams (/ˈeɪbrəmz/; born September 7, 1999) is an American singer and songwriter. She signed with Interscope Records in 2019 and gained recognition after releasing her debut extended play, Minor (2020), and its follow-up, This Is What It Feels Like (2021), alongside various singles including "I Miss You, I'm Sorry". Abrams released her debut album, Good Riddance (2023), and was nominated for the Grammy Award for Best New Artist. She also performed as an opening act on Olivia Rodrigo's Sour Tour (2022) and Taylor Swift's Eras Tour (2023–2024).

In 2023, Abrams featured on a remix to Noah Kahan's "Everywhere, Everything", which marked her first entry on the US Billboard Hot 100. She was also featured on the Forbes 30 Under 30 list that year. Her second studio album, The Secret of Us (2024), debuted at number two on the US Billboard 200 and was supported by the singles "Risk", "Close to You", "I Love You, I'm Sorry", and "That's So True"; the lattermost peaked at number four on the Billboard Global 200. Abrams collaborated with Taylor Swift on the album track "Us", which was nominated for the Grammy Award for Best Pop Duo/Group Performance. In 2025, Abrams won the American Music Award for New Artist of the Year.

== Early life ==
Gracie Madigan Abrams was born on September 7, 1999, in Los Angeles, California, and raised in Pacific Palisades, Los Angeles. She is the daughter of filmmaker J. J. Abrams and film and television producer Katie McGrath, and the granddaughter of producers Gerald W. Abrams and Carol Ann Abrams. Her paternal heritage is Ashkenazi Jewish, while her maternal background is Irish Catholic. Abrams has two brothers.

Abrams developed an interest in music from a young age and began writing songs at the age of eight. She attended The Archer School for Girls in West Los Angeles, and she graduated in 2018. Following her graduation, Abrams enrolled at Barnard College in New York City to study international relations, but she chose to take a break after her first year to pursue a career in music.

== Career ==
=== 2019–2023: EPs and Good Riddance ===
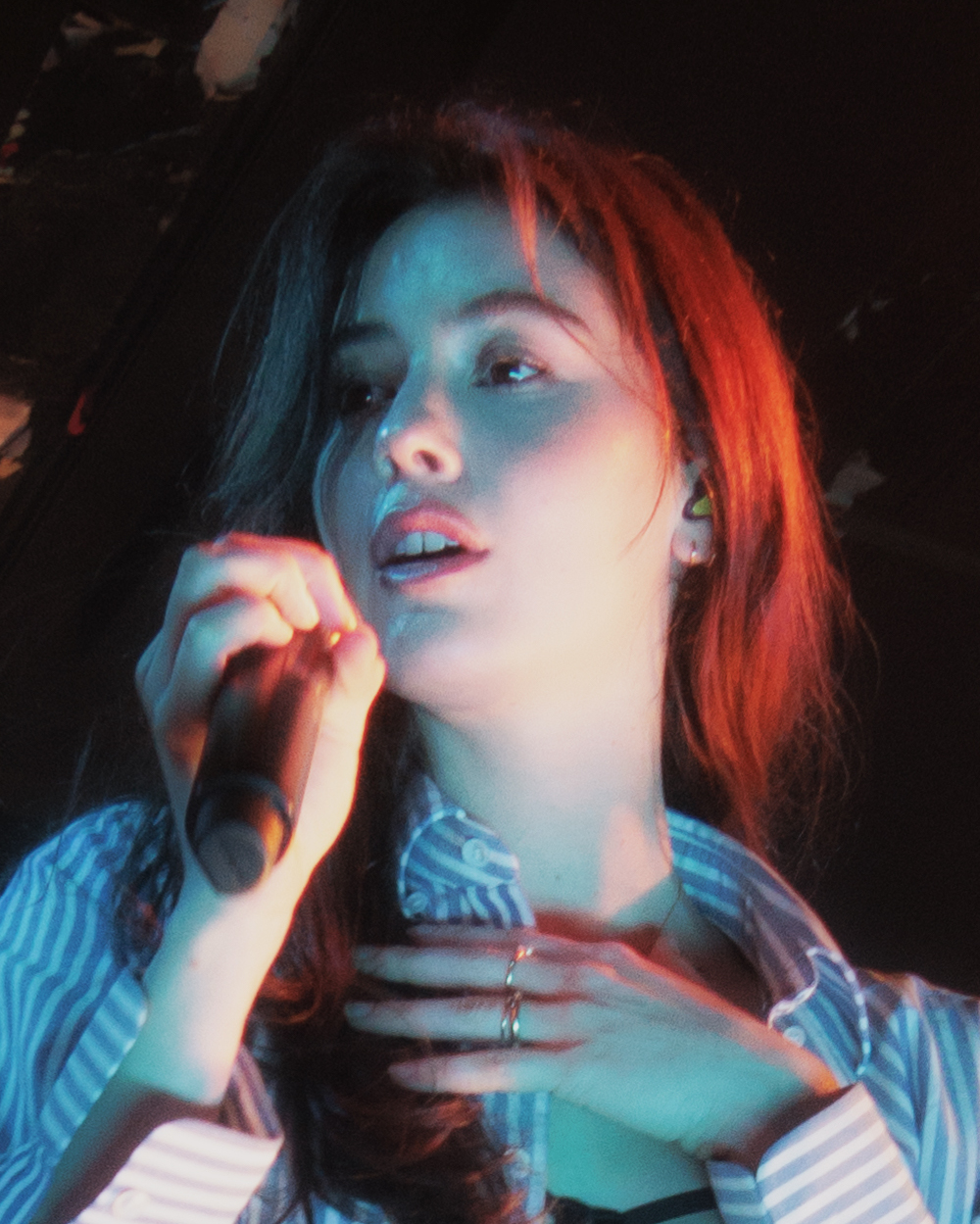
Abrams performing in Seattle in March 2022

In October 2019, Abrams released her debut single, "Mean It", under Interscope Records. In July 2020, Abrams released her debut extended play, Minor, which saw her collaborating with producers such as Joel Little and Blake Slatkin. The EP was supported by various singles, including "I Miss You, I'm Sorry". In March 2021, Abrams featured alongside Benny Blanco on "Unlearn". In May that year, she released the standalone single "Mess It Up". In October, Abrams announced her next EP, This Is What It Feels Like, which was released on November 12, 2021. The EP was preceded by the singles "Feels Like", and "Rockland"; with the latter created alongside Aaron Dessner. In support of the EP, she embarked on the This Is What It Feels Like Tour, which started on February 2, 2022, in Salt Lake City and concluded on May 31, 2022, in Stockholm. Along with her headlining tour, Abrams opened for Olivia Rodrigo as the supporting act for her Sour Tour. Abrams released "Difficult", the lead single to her then-upcoming debut album in October 2022.

On February 24, 2023, Abrams released her debut album Good Riddance. A deluxe edition was released in June of that year. Throughout 2023, Abrams performed as an opening act at selected shows of the US leg of Taylor Swift's Eras Tour, and returned as Swift's opening act for more US and Canadian shows in late 2024, also performing at the second to last show of the Eras Tour in Vancouver. She also embarked on the Good Riddance Tour, her third headlining concert tour. On November 8, 2023, she released the song "Cedar", which was featured on the soundtrack of The Buccaneers. She was nominated for Best New Artist for the 66th Annual Grammy Awards. Abrams was featured on a remix of the song "Everywhere, Everything" by Noah Kahan, which was released on December 1, 2023 and marked her first entry on the US Billboard Hot 100 at number 79. Late that year, Abrams featured on the Forbes 30 Under 30 list.

=== 2024–present: The Secret of Us and Daughter from Hell ===
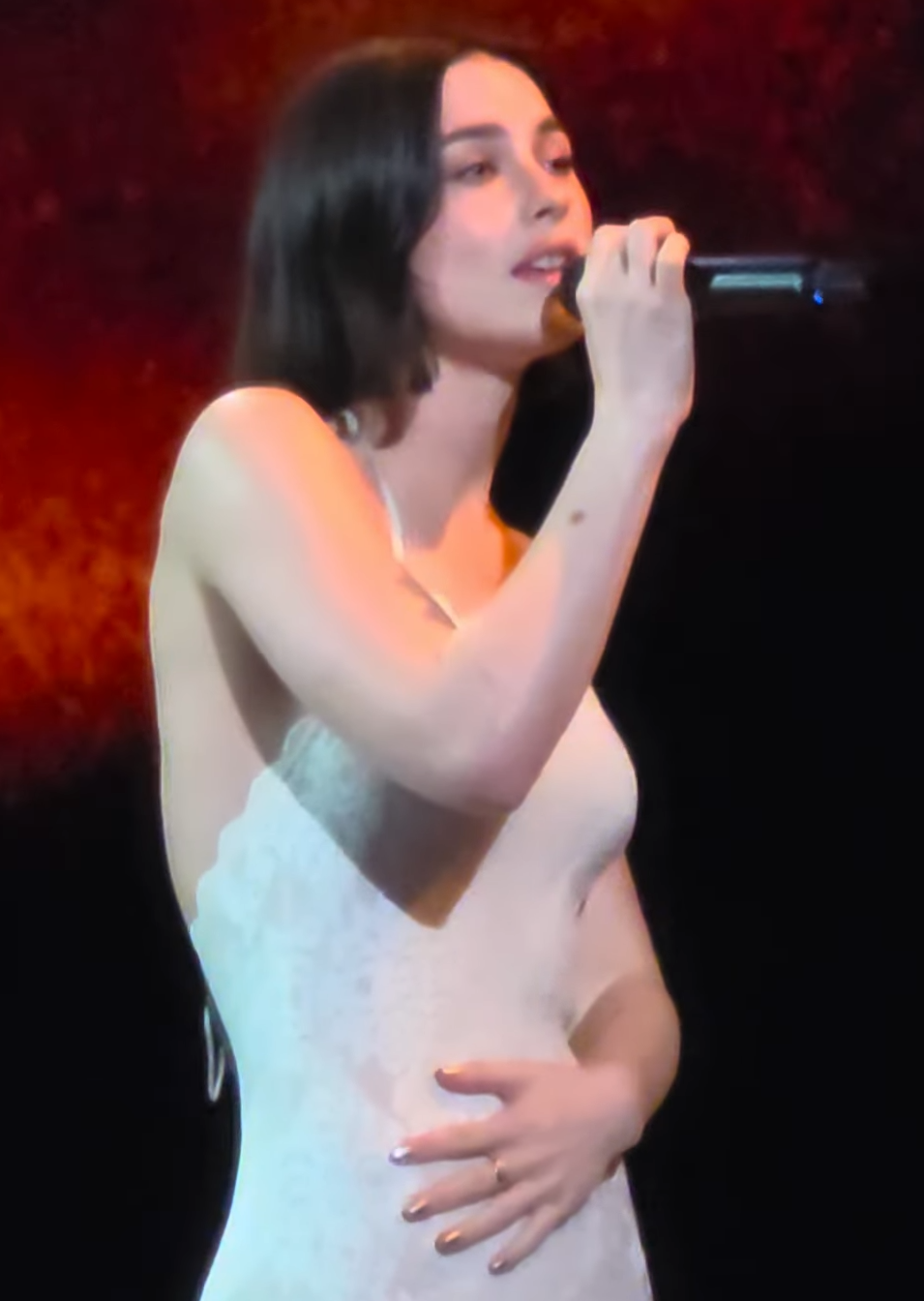
Abrams performing at FireAid in 2025

On April 29, 2024, Abrams announced her second album, The Secret of Us, which was released on June 21, 2024. The first single, titled "Risk", was released on May 1, 2024. To support the album, Abrams embarked on the Secret of Us Tour through the United States between September 5 and October 10, 2024. "Close to You" was released as the second single on June 7, 2024. The song was released after being previously teased seven years prior. Abrams released "I Love You, I'm Sorry" as the album's third single in October 2024, peaking at number 14 on the Billboard Global 200 chart.

"That's So True" was released as a single from the deluxe edition of The Secret of Us on November 6, 2024; it peaked atop the national charts of Australia, Canada, Ireland, New Zealand, and the United Kingdom. The track reached number four on the Billboard Global 200 chart and number six on the US Billboard Hot 100 chart. Abrams collaborated with Taylor Swift on "Us", which was released as part of The Secret of Us, and was nominated for Best Pop Duo/Group Performance at the 67th Annual Grammy Awards. Abrams continued The Secret of Us Tour in 2025, starting on February 8 in Madrid and scheduled to end on August 27 in Mexico City. In June and July 2025, Abrams performed two unreleased songs, titled "Out of Nowhere" and "Crazy Girl", during her sets at the Glastonbury Festival 2025 and BST Hyde Park 2025, respectively.

In January 2026, it was announced that Abrams will make her acting debut in the A24 film Please, written and directed by Halina Reijn. Abrams is being represented by the Creative Artists Agency.

Her third studio album, Daughter from Hell was released on July 17, 2026, with the lead single, "Hit the Wall", released on May 14. On May 28, Abrams announced the Look at My Life Tour in support of the album, scheduled from December 2026 to March 2027. The album's second single, "Look at My Life" was released on June 25.

== Artistry and musical influences ==
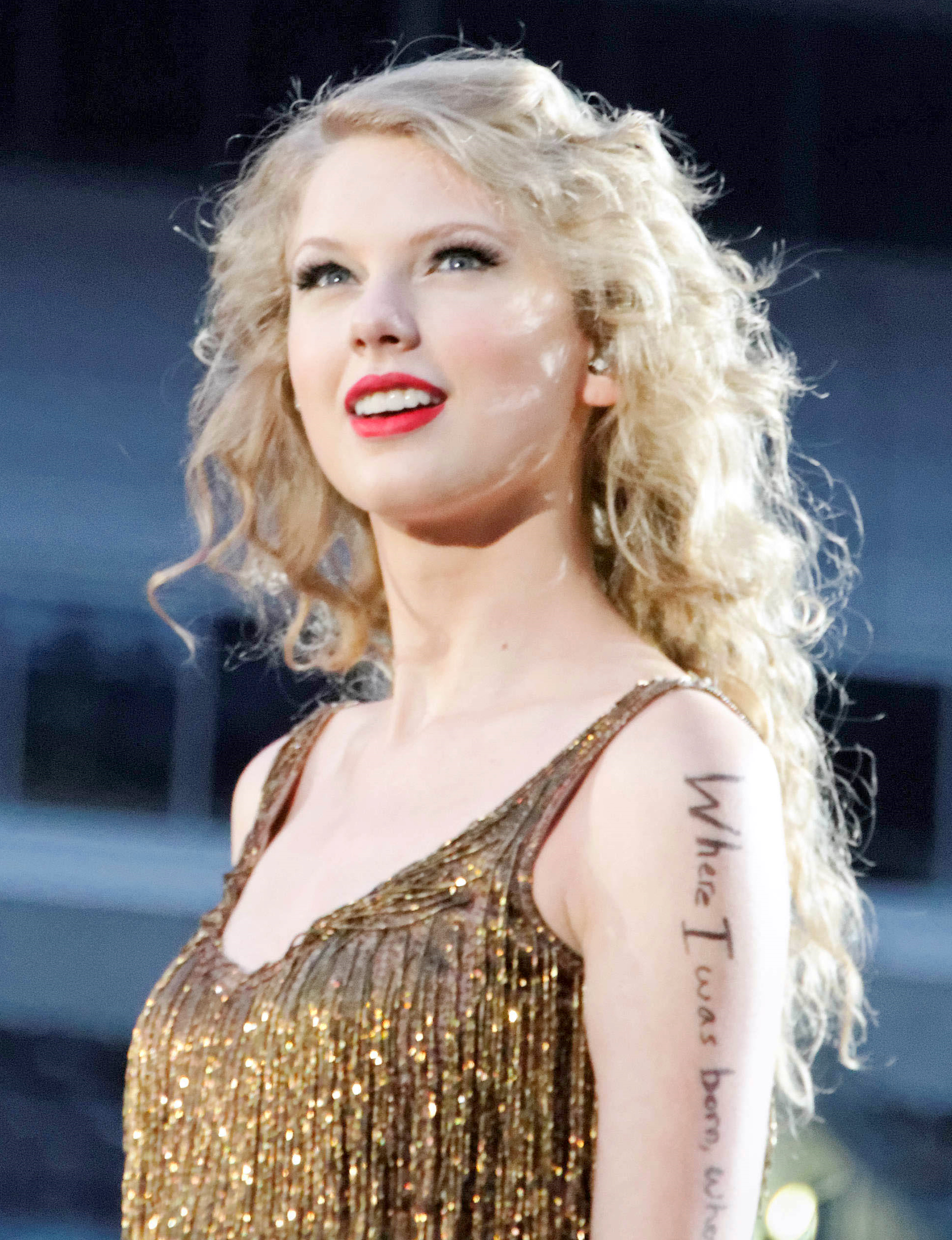
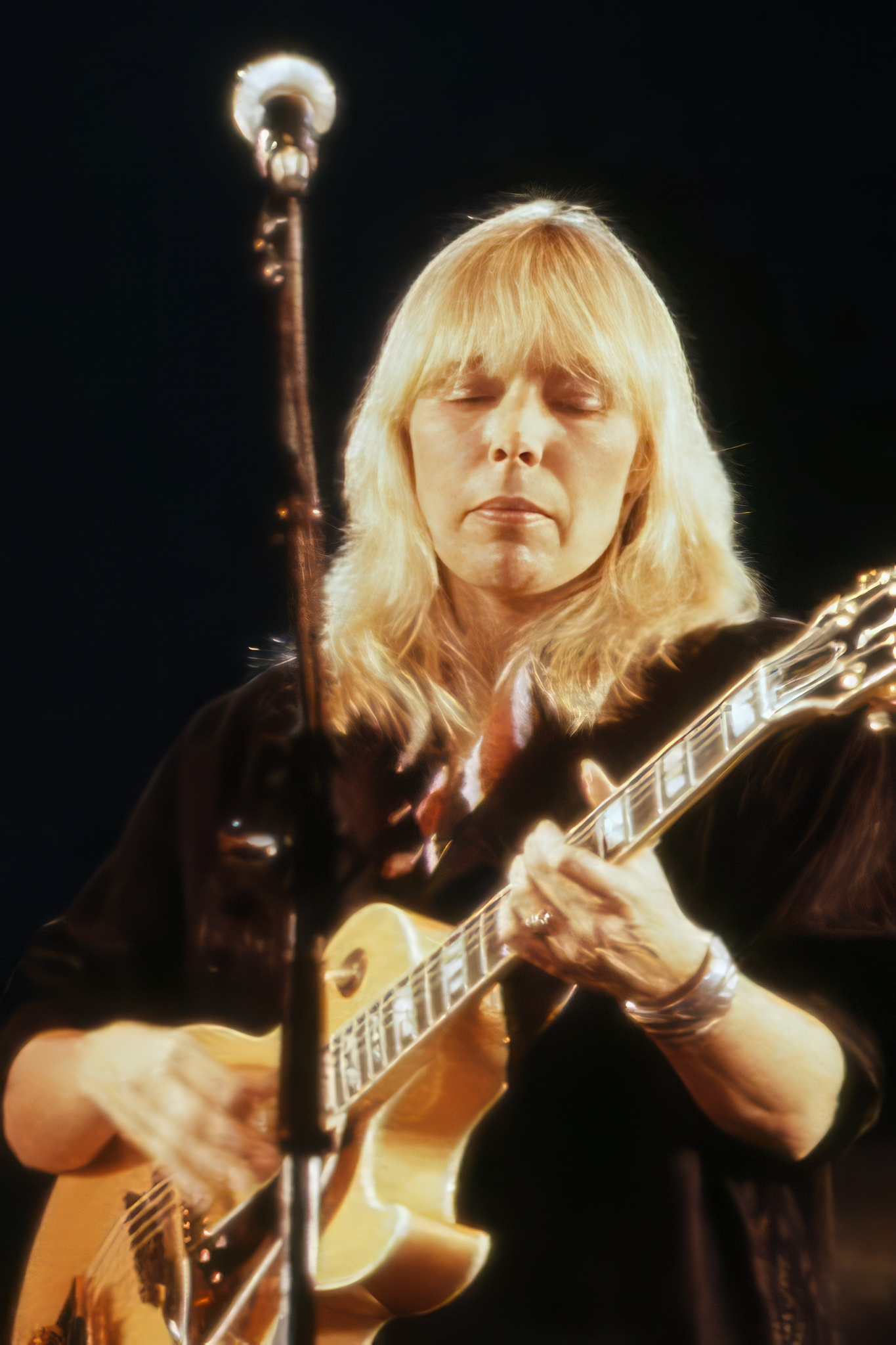
Abrams has named musicians such as Taylor Swift (left) and Joni Mitchell (right) as her influences.

Abrams's musical style has been classified as pop, bedroom pop, folk-pop, indie pop, and indie folk. She has been described as having a soprano or mezzo-soprano vocal range, with Andrew Butcher of music is to blame describing her vocals as "breathy" and "fragile".

Abrams has cited Taylor Swift, Joni Mitchell, Lorde, and Phoebe Bridgers as her biggest songwriting inspirations and musical idols. She has called Bridgers the "writer of our generation". She has a tattoo of the word "river" inspired by Mitchell's song of the same name. Abrams has also been inspired by her contemporaries such as Olivia Rodrigo. She has joined both Swift and Rodrigo on tours. Other artists that have inspired her include Robyn, Simon & Garfunkel, Elvis Costello, Bon Iver, Elliott Smith, Kate Bush, Lana Del Rey, the 1975, James Blake, Metric, and the Killers.

== Endorsements ==
Abrams was selected to be one of the faces of Pandora's 2022 ME campaign. She co-starred in Tumi's Fall 2022 Built for the Journey campaign in the same year. In October 2024, she became a brand ambassador for Chanel's Coco Crush jewelry collection. In January 2026, Chanel announced Abrams as the new face of their Coco Crush fine jewelry collection, positioning her alongside global ambassadors like Blackpink's Jennie Kim in a major worldwide campaign that debuted at the Chateau Marmont.

== Activism ==
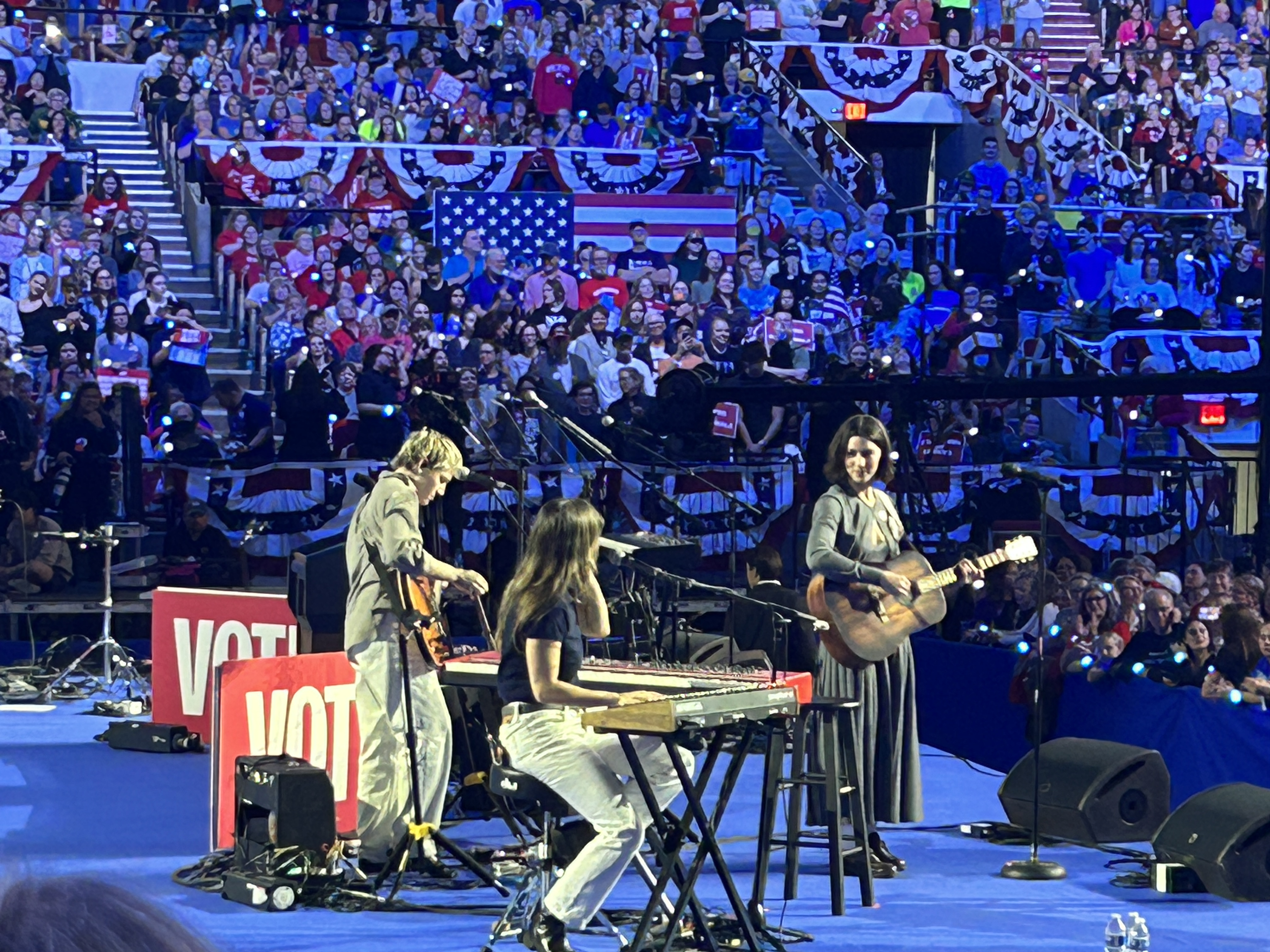
Abrams (right) performing at a Kamala Harris 2024 presidential campaign rally in Madison, Wisconsin in October 2024

In a 2020 interview, Abrams supported expressing personal views through music, saying, "I can't separate my music from my opinions... it's a whole that reflects my way of thinking. You shouldn't be afraid to talk about what you believe in."

After a leaked draft opinion showed that the U.S. Supreme Court was planning to overturn abortion legality established in Roe v. Wade, Abrams was among 160 musical artists including Olivia Rodrigo, Clairo, Lorde, Billie Eilish, Megan Thee Stallion, Halsey, and Phoebe Bridgers that signed a full-page ad in The New York Times in May 2022 condemning the planned Supreme Court decision. In July 2022, Abrams released a limited-edition T-shirt whose complete sale proceeds would go to the National Network of Abortion Funds. Abrams said that while this is "only a small part in a massively anti-democratic effort that is underway in this country", she believes that she can "use [her] platform to amplify the experts in this moment".

In 2023, shortly after the beginning of the Gaza war, Abrams joined a number of artists in Artists4Ceasefire, demanding a ceasefire in the war. She has spoken out against the starvation of Palestinian children. In September 2025, Abrams reshared a post on Instagram that stated: "UN says Israel is committing genocide in Gaza."

Abrams endorsed Kamala Harris in the 2024 United States presidential election. She performed at a Harris rally in Madison, Wisconsin, on October 30, 2024.

On 22 December 2025, she released a charity single "Sold Out" exclusively via Bandcamp, with all proceeds benefiting Everytown for Gun Safety.

== Personal life ==
Abrams is best friends with Audrey Hobert, the two having met at their fifth grade graduation. Abrams was in a relationship with songwriter and producer Blake Slatkin from 2017 to 2022. She has been in a relationship with Irish actor Paul Mescal since 2024.

== Discography ==
- Good Riddance (2023)
- The Secret of Us (2024)
- Daughter from Hell (2026)

== Filmography ==
Year	Title	Role	Notes	Ref.
TBD	Please †	TBA	Pre-production	

Key
†	Denotes that the film has yet to be released

== Tours ==
=== Headlining ===
- I've Missed You, I'm Sorry Tour (2021)
- This Is What It Feels Like Tour (2022)
- Good Riddance Tour (2023–2024)
- The Secret of Us Tour (2024–2025)
- The Look at My Life Tour (2026–2027)

=== Opening act ===
- Olivia Rodrigo – Sour Tour (2022)
- Taylor Swift – The Eras Tour (2023–2024)

== Awards and nominations ==
Award	Year	Nominee(s) / Work(s)	Category	Result	Ref.
American Music Awards	2025	Herself	New Artist of the Year	Won	
American Music Awards	2025	The Secret of Us	Album of the Year	Nominated	
ARIA Music Awards	2025	Herself	Best International Artist	Nominated	
Billboard Women in Music	2025	Herself	Songwriter of the Year	Won	
Brit Awards	2026	"That's So True"	Best International Song	Nominated	
Grammy Awards	2024	Herself	Best New Artist	Nominated	
Grammy Awards	2025	"Us" (with Taylor Swift)	Best Pop Duo/Group Performance	Nominated	
iHeartRadio Music Awards	2024	Herself	Social Star Award	Won	
iHeartRadio Music Awards	2025	Herself	Breakthrough Artist	Won	
iHeartRadio Music Awards	2025	Herself	Best New Pop Artist	Nominated	
iHeartRadio Music Awards	2025	"I Love You, I'm Sorry"	Best Lyrics	Nominated	
Nickelodeon Kids' Choice Awards	2025	"That's So True"	Favorite Viral Song	Nominated	
Nickelodeon Kids' Choice Awards	2025	"Call Me When You Break Up"	Favorite Music Collaboration	Nominated	
Nickelodeon Kids' Choice Awards	2026	"Hit the Wall"	Favorite Viral Song	Nominated	
MTV Video Music Awards	2024	Herself	Best New Artist	Nominated	
MTV Video Music Awards	2025	"I Love You, I'm Sorry"	Song of the Year	Nominated	
NRJ Music Award	2025	Herself	International Breakthrough of the Year	Nominated	
Swiss Music Awards	2025	Herself	Best International Breaking Act	Won	
