= I Miss You, I'm Sorry =

2020 single by Gracie Abrams

Single by Gracie Abrams

from the EP Minor
- Released: April 8, 2020
- Length: 2:48
- Label: Interscope
- Songwriters: Gracie Abrams; Sarah Aarons
- Producer: Blake Slatkin

Gracie Abrams singles chronology
| "21" (2020) | "I Miss You, I'm Sorry" (2020) | "Long Sleeves" (2020) |

Music video
- “I Miss You, I'm Sorry” on YouTube

"I Miss You, I'm Sorry" is a song by American singer-songwriter Gracie Abrams, released on April 8, 2020. The song was released as the second single from her debut EP, Minor.

== Composition ==
“I Miss You, I'm Sorry” is a ballad about a bad break up. She reminisces about her regrets in a past relationship and is trying to sort through her emotions, including the temptation of trying to piece something irreparably broken back together.

After the song was released, Gracie posted on Instagram about her concerns with releasing music amidst a global pandemic:

i know everything is scary and uncertain right now and i thought that maybe this wasn't the right time to release anything, but the truth is that writing and listening to music have always grounded me whenever i find myself feeling scared or anxious or excited or lost or in love or out of control.

Abrams wrote the song with Sarah Aarons. She also stated that she wrote the song about her producer, Blake Slatkin.

== Live performances ==
In November 2022, Abrams was announced as an opener for Taylor Swift's The Eras Tour. She was originally supposed to open for the show on July 1, 2023, at Paycor Stadium in Cincinnati, Ohio, but due to the weather forecast, her set was cut. During Swift's acoustic act, she invited Abrams on stage where they performed "I Miss You, I'm Sorry" together.

== Usage in media ==
The song was featured in the Netflix show Ginny & Georgia in the season two finale.

== Charts ==
Chart performance for "I Miss You, I'm Sorry"
| Chart (2024) | Peak position |
|---|---|
| Ireland (IRMA) | 20 |
| Netherlands (Single Top 100) | 98 |
| Portugal (AFP) | 196 |
| Sweden Heatseeker (Sverigetopplistan) | 20 |
| UK Singles (Official Charts) | 81 |

== Certifications ==
Certifications for "I Miss You, I'm Sorry"
| Region | Certification | Certified units/sales |
|---|---|---|
| Australia (ARIA) | 2× Platinum | 140,000^{‡} |
| Brazil (Pro-Música Brasil) | Platinum | 40,000^{‡} |
| Canada (Music Canada) | 3× Platinum | 240,000^{‡} |
| Denmark (IFPI Danmark) | Gold | 45,000^{‡} |
| France (SNEP) | Gold | 100,000^{‡} |
| New Zealand (RMNZ) | Platinum | 30,000^{‡} |
| Norway (IFPI Norway) | Gold | 30,000^{‡} |
| Poland (ZPAV) | Gold | 25,000^{‡} |
| Portugal (AFP) | Platinum | 10,000^{‡} |
| Spain (Promusicae) | Gold | 30,000^{‡} |
| United Kingdom (BPI) | Platinum | 600,000^{‡} |
^{‡} Sales+streaming figures based on certification alone.

== Release history ==
Release history and formats for "I Miss You, I'm Sorry"
| Region | Date | Format | Label |
|---|---|---|---|
| Various | April 8, 2020 | Digital download, streaming | Interscope |
