= DAISY (band) =

American jazz/punk band

- Origin: Los Angeles, California, United States
- Years active: 2015–2022
- Members: Daisy Hamel-Buffa; Alex Kasvikis; Clayton Kraus; Matt Fildey; Ben Roswell Salk
- Website: helloimdaisy.com

DAISY was a band based in Los Angeles, California. DAISY is composed of Daisy Hamel-Buffa, Alex Kasvikis, Clayton Kraus, Matt Fildey, and Ben Roswell Salk. Their genre has been described as "loud jazz" and "R&B punk."

== History ==
DAISY has been making music together since 2014, with connections to The Internet because they "just kind of lived down the street from my friend," explained Daisy Hamel-Buffa for Impose Magazine. DAISY released their first album, Smoke About It in 2016. DAISY released their first single in 2018 with "Still Here" off their album Have A Snack. The track "Still Here" was originally supposed to feature a rap verse but when that fell through, the verse was replaced with a call-and-response verse with pitched vocals. In 2019 they released their second single named "Day Off." The beat for "Day Off" was provided by The Internet's Matt Martians and Hamel-Buffa wrote the lyrics about "this very big crush I had on this boy that works at the Trader Joe's down my street and having this unsolicited crush on this guy and does he even know that I exist, and does he notice that I'm obsessed with him," as she explained in an interview with FADER. The music video for "Day Off" was directed by Seannie Bryan. On August 3, 2022, they announced on their social media that the band was performing their two last shows. DAISY has been inactive since.

== Members ==
- Daisy Hamel-Buffa – vocals
- Alex Kasvikis – bass
- Clayton Kraus – drums
- Matt Fildey – guitar and dancing
- Ben Roswell Salk – keyboard

== Musical style ==
The group's first EP, Smoke About it, is composed of four songs recorded in one-take and two of the tracks, "Way Cool Baby Love" and "Overtime" feature an abrupt time change midway through. Alex Kasvikis explained to Impose Magazine that, “To me it feels like part of making pop music, making music that is catchy, both by nature and intentionally, and then at some point, tearing that rug out from the listener.”
