= Gracie Abrams discography =

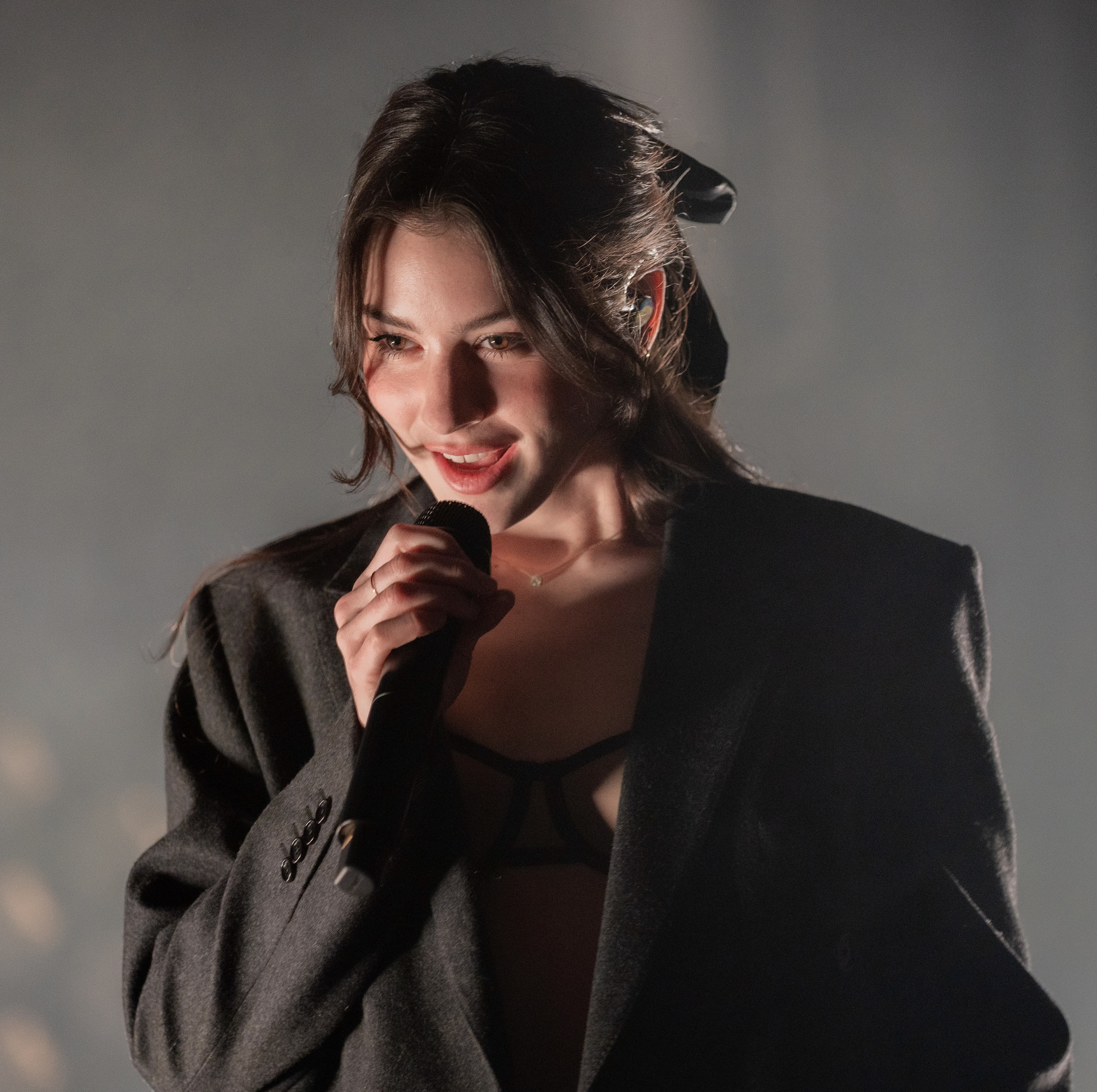
- Abrams performing in 2022
- Studio albums: 3
- EPs: 3
- Singles: 25
- Live albums: 2

American singer-songwriter Gracie Abrams has released three studio albums, two live albums, three extended plays, and 25 singles (including one as a featured artist).

== Albums ==
=== Studio albums ===
List of studio albums, with selected details, chart positions, and certifications shown
Title	Album details	Peak chart positions										Certifications
Title	Album details	US	AUS	CAN	GER	IRE	NLD	NZ	SWE	SWI	UK	Certifications
Good Riddance	Released: February 24, 2023; Label: Interscope; Formats: CD, LP, digital download, streaming	52	30	55	19	4	—	40	—	92	3	BPI: Gold; MC: Gold
The Secret of Us	Released: June 21, 2024; Label: Interscope; Formats: CD, LP, digital download, streaming	2	1	1	3	2	1	1	8	5	1	ARIA: Platinum; BPI: Platinum; MC: 3× Platinum; RMNZ: 2× Platinum
Daughter from Hell	Released: July 17, 2026; Label: Interscope; Formats: CD, LP, digital download, streaming	1	1	1	1	1	1	1	8	2	1	BPI: Silver
"—" denotes an album that did not chart.

=== Live albums ===
List of live albums, with selected details and chart positions shown
Title	Album details	Peak chart positions		
Title	Album details	US	NLD	UK
The Good Riddance Acoustic Shows (Live) (with Aaron Dessner)	Released: February 23, 2024; Label: Interscope; Formats: LP	—	37	—
The Secret of Us: Live from Radio City Music Hall	Released: April 12, 2025; Label: Interscope; Formats: LP	141	14	74
Apple Music Live: Gracie Abrams	Released: October 29, 2025; Label: Interscope; Formats: Digital download, streaming (Note: Apple Music exclusive)	—	—	—

== Extended plays ==
List of extended plays, with selected details and chart positions shown
Title	EP details	Peak chart positions					Certifications
Title	EP details	US Heat.	GER	NLD	SWI	UK	Certifications
Minor	Released: July 14, 2020; Label: Interscope; Formats: LP, digital download, streaming	—	6	14	39	51	MC: Gold; RMNZ: Gold
This Is What It Feels Like	Released: November 12, 2021; Label: Interscope; Formats: LP, digital download, streaming	14	—	—	—	—	
Live from Vevo	Released: January 17, 2025; Label: Interscope; Formats: LP	—	—	—	—	—	
"—" denotes an album that did not chart or was not released in that territory.

== Singles ==
=== As lead artist ===
List of singles as lead artist, with year released, selected chart positions, certifications, and album name shown
Title	Year	Peak chart positions										Certifications	Album
Title	Year	US	AUS	CAN	IRE	NLD	NZ	SWE	SWI	UK	WW	Certifications	Album
"Mean It"	2019	—	—	—	—	—	—	—	—	—	—		Non-album singles
"Stay"	2019	—	—	—	—	—	—	—	—	—	—	ARIA: Gold; RMNZ: Gold	Non-album singles
"21"	2020	—	—	—	—	—	—	—	—	—	—	RIAA: Gold; ARIA: Platinum; BPI: Silver; MC: Platinum; RMNZ: Gold	Minor
"I Miss You, I'm Sorry"	2020	—	—	—	20	98	—	— (Note: "I Miss You, I'm Sorry" did not enter the Swedish Singellista Chart, but peaked at number 20 on the Swedish Heatseeker Chart.)	—	81	—	RIAA: Gold; ARIA: 2× Platinum; BPI: Platinum; MC: 3× Platinum; RMNZ: Platinum	Minor
"Long Sleeves"	2020	—	—	—	—	—	—	—	—	—	—		Minor
"Brush Fire"	2020	—	—	—	—	—	—	—	—	—	—		Non-album single
"Unlearn" (with Benny Blanco)	2021	—	—	—	—	—	—	—	—	—	—		Friends Keep Secrets 2
"Mess It Up"	2021	—	—	—	—	—	—	—	—	—	—	ARIA: Platinum; BPI: Silver; MC: Platinum; RMNZ: Gold	Non-album single
"Feels Like"	2021	—	—	—	—	—	— (Note: "Feels Like" did not enter the NZ Top 40 Singles Chart, but peaked at number 37 on the NZ Hot Singles Chart.)	—	—	—	—	RIAA: Gold; ARIA: Platinum; BPI: Silver; MC: Platinum; RMNZ: Gold	This Is What It Feels Like
"Rockland"	2021	—	—	—	—	—	—	—	—	—	—		This Is What It Feels Like
"Alright"	2021	—	—	—	—	—	—	—	—	—	—		This Is What It Feels Like
"Block Me Out" (Note: "Block Me Out" is included on the deluxe edition of Good Riddance.)	2022	—	—	—	—	—	—	—	—	—	—		Good Riddance
"Difficult"	2022	—	—	—	—	—	—	—	—	—	—		Good Riddance
"Where Do We Go Now?"	2023	—	—	—	—	—	— (Note: "Where Do We Go Now?" did not enter the NZ Top 40 Singles Chart, but peaked at number 23 on the NZ Hot Singles Chart.)	—	—	—	—		Good Riddance
"Amelie"	2023	—	—	—	—	—	—	—	—	—	—		Good Riddance
"I Know It Won't Work"	2023	— (Note: "I Know It Won't Work" did not chart on the Billboard Hot 100, although did peak at number 32 on the Pop Airplay chart.)	—	—	—	—	— (Note: "I Know It Won't Work" did not enter the NZ Top 40 Singles Chart, but peaked at number 34 on the NZ Hot Singles Chart.)	—	—	— (Note: "I Know It Won't Work" did not enter the UK Singles Chart, but peaked at number 32 on the Official Singles Sales chart.)	—	ARIA: Gold; BPI: Silver; RMNZ: Gold	Good Riddance
"Everywhere, Everything" (with Noah Kahan)	2023	79	—	60	49	—	— (Note: "Everywhere, Everything" did not enter the NZ Top 40 Singles Chart, but peaked at number six on the NZ Hot Singles Chart.)	—	—	72	—	RIAA: 2× Platinum; ARIA: Platinum; BPI: Platinum; MC: Platinum; RMNZ: Gold	Stick Season (Forever)
"Risk"	2024	94	67	64	48	—	— (Note: "Risk" did not enter the NZ Top 40 Singles Chart, but peaked at number 11 on the NZ Hot Singles Chart.)	—	—	67	—	ARIA: Platinum; BPI: Gold; MC: Platinum; RMNZ: Platinum	The Secret of Us
"Close to You"	2024	49	34	40	10	— (Note: "Close To You" did not enter the Dutch Single Top 100, but peaked at number 10 on the Dutch Single Tip chart.)	31	— (Note: "Close To You" did not enter the Swedish Singellista Chart, but peaked at number seven on the Swedish Heatseeker Chart.)	—	31	59	ARIA: 2× Platinum; BPI: Platinum; MC: 3× Platinum; RMNZ: Platinum	The Secret of Us
"I Love You, I'm Sorry"	2024	19	7	14	1	9	5	32	40	4	14	RIAA: Gold; ARIA: 4× Platinum; BPI: 2× Platinum; MC: 5× Platinum; RMNZ: 2× Platinum	The Secret of Us
"That's So True"	2024	6	1	1	1	1	1	2	2	1	4	ARIA: 7× Platinum; BPI: 3× Platinum; IFPI SWI: Platinum; MC: 7× Platinum; RMNZ: 4× Platinum	The Secret of Us (Deluxe)
"Call Me When You Break Up" (with Selena Gomez and Benny Blanco)	2025	46	84	41	37	—	— (Note: "Call Me When You Break Up" did not enter the NZ Top 40 Singles Chart, but peaked at number 6 on the NZ Hot Singles Chart.)	— (Note: "Call Me When You Break Up" did not enter the Swedish Singellista Chart, but peaked at number 2 on the Swedish Heatseeker Chart.)	—	28	54	BPI: Silver; MC: Gold	I Said I Love You First
"Hit the Wall"	2026	26	22	23	14	84	24	— (Note: "Hit the Wall" did not enter the Swedish Singellista Chart, but peaked at number 7 on the Swedish Heatseeker Chart.)	43	18	45	BPI: Silver	Daughter from Hell
"Look at My Life"	2026	54	32	38	42	— (Note: "Look at My Life" did not enter the Dutch Single Top 100, but peaked at number 18 on the Dutch Single Tip chart.)	— (Note: "Look at My Life" did not enter the NZ Top 40 Singles Chart, but it peaked at number 2 on the NZ Hot Singles Chart.)	—	—	39	86		Daughter from Hell
"Good Reason"	2026	51	46	36	56	—	— (Note: "Good Reason" did not enter the NZ Top 40 Singles Chart, but it peaked at number 1 on the NZ Hot Singles Chart.)	—	—	55	99		Daughter from Hell
"Here You Come, There You Go"	2026	73	66	45	40	—	— (Note: "Here You Come, There You Go" did not enter the NZ Top 40 Singles Chart, but it peaked at number 1 on the NZ Hot Singles Chart.)	—	—	44	199		Daughter from Hell (Deluxe)
"—" denotes a single that did not chart or was not released in that territory.

=== As featured artist ===
List of singles as featured artist, with year released and album name shown
Title	Year	Album
"Pad Thai" (Tjani featuring Gracie Abrams)	2017	Non-album single

== Other charted and certified songs ==
List of other charted and certified songs, with year released, selected chart positions, certifications, and album name shown
Title	Year	Peak chart positions								Certifications	Album
Title	Year	US	AUS	CAN	IRE	POR	NZ	UK	WW	Certifications	Album
"Blowing Smoke"	2024	—	—	—	—	—	— (Note: "Blowing Smoke" did not enter the NZ Top 40 Singles Chart, but peaked at number 12 on the NZ Hot Singles Chart.)	—	—	ARIA: Gold; BPI: Silver; RMNZ: Gold	The Secret of Us
"Us" (featuring Taylor Swift)	2024	36	25	31	35	85	30	37	34	ARIA: Platinum; BPI: Silver; MC: Platinum; RMNZ: Gold	The Secret of Us
"Tough Love"	2024	—	—	—	—	—	— (Note: "Tough Love" did not enter the NZ Top 40 Singles Chart, but peaked at number 14 on the NZ Hot Singles Chart.)	—	—		The Secret of Us
"Free Now"	2024	—	—	—	—	—	—	—	—	ARIA: Gold; BPI: Silver; RMNZ: Gold	The Secret of Us
"Cool"	2024	—	—	—	—	—	— (Note: "Cool" did not enter the NZ Top 40 Singles Chart, but peaked at number seven on the NZ Hot Singles Chart.)	—	—		The Secret of Us (Deluxe)
"I Told You Things"	2024	—	—	—	84	—	— (Note: "I Told You Things" did not enter the NZ Top 40 Singles Chart, but peaked at number six on the NZ Hot Singles Chart.)	—	—	BPI: Silver; MC: Gold	The Secret of Us (Deluxe)
"Packing It Up"	2024	—	—	—	—	—	— (Note: "Packing It Up" did not enter the NZ Top 40 Singles Chart, but peaked at number eight on the NZ Hot Singles Chart.)	—	—		The Secret of Us (Deluxe)
"Badlands" (with Mumford & Sons)	2026	— (Note: "Badlands" did not enter the Billboard Hot 100, but peaked at number 25 on the Bubbling Under Hot 100 chart, which acts as an extension to the Hot 100.)	—	89	71	—	— (Note: "Badlands" did not enter the NZ Top 40 Singles Chart, but peaked at number eight on the NZ Hot Singles Chart.)	64	—		Prizefighter
"Death Wish"	2026	— (Note: "Death Wish" did not enter the Billboard Hot 100, but peaked at number 10 on the Bubbling Under Hot 100 chart, which acts as an extension to the Hot 100.)	78	61	—	—	— (Note: "Death Wish" did not enter the NZ Top 40 Singles Chart, but it peaked at number 33 on the NZ Hot Singles Chart.)	—	—		Daughter from Hell
"The Knife"	2026	— (Note: "The Knife" did not enter the Billboard Hot 100, but peaked at number 9 on the Bubbling Under Hot 100 chart, which acts as an extension to the Hot 100.)	77	59	—	—	— (Note: "The Knife" did not enter the NZ Top 40 Singles Chart, but it peaked at number 2 on the NZ Hot Singles Chart.)	—	—		Daughter from Hell
"Daughter from Hell"	2026	— (Note: "Daughter from Hell" did not enter the Billboard Hot 100, but peaked at number 12 on the Bubbling Under Hot 100 chart, which acts as an extension to the Hot 100.)	99	74	—	—	— (Note: "Daughter from Hell" did not enter the NZ Top 40 Singles Chart, but it peaked at number 4 on the NZ Hot Singles Chart.)	—	—		Daughter from Hell
"Men Like You"	2026	— (Note: "Men Like You" did not enter the Billboard Hot 100, but peaked at number 18 on the Bubbling Under Hot 100 chart, which acts as an extension to the Hot 100.)	97	76	—	—	—	—	—		Daughter from Hell
"Broke My Heart"	2026	—	—	99	—	—	—	—	—		Daughter from Hell
"Minibar"	2026	99	82	56	51	—	— (Note: "Minibar" did not enter the NZ Top 40 Singles Chart, but it peaked at number 3 on the NZ Hot Singles Chart.)	—	—		Daughter from Hell
"—" denotes a song that did not chart or was not released in that territory.

== Guest appearances ==
List of non-single guest appearances, showing year released and album name
Title	Year	Other artist(s)	Album
"Cedar"	2023	—N/a	The Buccaneers: Season 1
"Badlands"	2026	Mumford & Sons	Prizefighter

== Songwriting credits ==
Title	Year	Artist	Album	Ref
"Ophelia"	2025	Charlotte Lawrence	Somewhere	

== Music videos ==
Title	Year	Director	Ref
"Mean It"	2019	Unknown	
"Stay"	2020	Unknown	
"21" (acoustic)	2020	Unknown	
"Friend"	2020	Alex Lill	
"Mess It Up"	2021	Matty Peacock	
"Feels Like"	2021	Gracie Abrams and Matty Peacock	
"The Bottom"	2021	Jared Hogan	
"Where Do We Go Now?"	2023	Gia Coppola	
"I Know It Won't Work"	2023	Julian Klincewicz	
"Risk"	2024	Audrey Hobert	
"I Love You, I'm Sorry"	2024	Audrey Hobert	
"Hit the Wall"	2026	Renell Medrano	
"Look at My Life"	2026	Mitch Ryan	
