= Rage & Sorrow =

EP by Breland
- Released: June 19, 2020
- Length: 4:53
- Label: Bad Realm; Atlantic
- Producer: Brian Kennedy (track 3); Rob Persaud (track 3); Carson Thatcher (tracks 1–2)

Breland chronology
| Breland (2020) | Rage & Sorrow (2020) | Cross Country (2022) |

Rage & Sorrow is the second extended play by American musician Breland. Released on June 19, 2020, for Juneteenth. The EP touches on the then ongoing George Floyd protests, as well as structural racism and repressed emotions.

== Background and composition ==
The day after the murder of George Floyd, Breland wrote the song "The Message". Rage & Sorrow was released on Juneteenth, a holiday celebrating the end of slavery, amid the George Floyd protests. In an Instagram post, Breland stated

Many of us have been oscillating between inspiration and desperation over the past few weeks, and I haven’t always known what to do or say about it. Inside me at any given moment lie two distinct emotions: Rage & Sorrow. We focus a lot on the rage because it makes us feel powerful, but without acknowledging the sorrow, sometimes we end up only hurting ourselves. It is okay to feel both of these emotions, and to feel them deeply. The two songs I’m dropping tonight speak to my journey toward this emotional balance, and I hope everyone who listens finds similar peace. Happy Juneteenth.

Breland stated in an interview with Billboard that Rage & Sorrow "felt really good to put out", and that he wanted show both the rage and sorrow of the energy of the George Floyd protests, and show the importance of balance.

The EP consists of three tracks, "Intro", "A Message", and "Real Men Don't Cry". "Intro" is a short, mainly spoken word track, in which Breland talks about the history of racism in the United States. "A Message" is a one-minute rap song "filled with aggression" with a "bare-knuckle" beat. The song discusses the George Floyd protests and encourages fans to advocate for change, and has been described to be a "call to do better" and "a musical 'I told you so'". Both "Intro" and "A Message" sample the song Tobacco Road. The final song, "Real Men Don't Cry" is a piano ballad with falsetto vocals and R&B influences about repressed emotions and masculinity in the context of the George Floyd protests. It was written prior to the George Floyd protests.

== Track listing ==
| No. | Title | Length |
|---|---|---|
| 1. | "Intro" | 0:37 |
| 2. | "The Message" | 1:11 |
| 3. | "Real Men Don't Cry" | 3:05 |
| Total length: | | 4:53 |
