= Bigger Man =

Single by Joy Oladokun and Maren Morris

from the album In Defense of My Own Happiness
- Released: May 14, 2021
- Genre: Pop
- Length: 3:07
- Label: Amigo
- Songwriters: Jimmy Robbins; Laura Veltz; Maren Morris; Joy Oladokun
- Producers: Jimmy Robbins; Joy Oladokun

Joy Oladokun singles chronology
"Sorry Isn't Good Enough" (2021)	"Bigger Man" (2021)	"Who Are You" (2021)

Maren Morris singles chronology
"Chasing After You" (2021)	"Bigger Man" (2021)	"Circles Around This Town" (2022)

Visualizer
- "Bigger Man" on YouTube

"Bigger Man" is a song by American singers Joy Oladokun and Maren Morris. It was released on May 14, 2021, as the eighth single of Oladokun's major-label debut studio album, In Defense of My Own Happiness (2021). Written during Oladokun and Morris's first songwriting session together, the song reflects on the pressure to "be the bigger man" despite unequal expectations. A pop ballad, its lyrics explore perseverance and resilience in personal and systemic challenges.

== Background ==
After signing a joint partnership with Amigo Records, Verve Forecast, and Republic Records, Oladokun released three singles: "Sorry Isn't Good Enough", "Jordan", and "Wish You the Best"—from her major-label debut and third overall studio album, In Defense of My Own Happiness.

According to Oladokun, the idea came to her while meditating on the morning of the session and was inspired by her experience of often feeling expected to "be the bigger man" despite being "the youngest and the most inexperienced" in many situations. She said the song also reflects the pressure faced by women and people of color to be "stronger, better, brighter, and harder working" in order to succeed. Oladokun added that she was proud of both the song and the friendship that grew out of the session, expressing hope that it would resonate with listeners in the same way it had with her.

== Composition ==
"Bigger Man" is a pop ballad co-written by Morris, Jimmy Robbins, and Laura Veltz during their first songwriting session together. Lyrically, it is about having to "take the high road" even after working hard to reach equal footing in the first place, according to Dave Paulson of The Tennessean.

== Release and promotion ==
Announcing the song on social media, Oladokun wrote, "Apparently this whole thing is not a dream ...", adding that she felt "so blessed" to collaborate with Morris, whom she described as "an incredible artist and human". She also said she believed they had written "something really special" that had been "helping [her] through it". "Bigger Man" was released on May 14.

== Personnel ==
Credits were adapted from Tidal.

- Joy Oladokun – lead vocals, producer, songwriter
- Maren Morris – vocals, songwriter
- Jimmy Robbins – producer, songwriter, banjo, keyboards, percussion, piano, programming, recording engineer
- Jordan Lehning – recording engineer, string arranger
- Austin Hoke – cello
- Betsy Lamb – viola
- Bobby Chase – violin
- Kristin Weber – violin
- Pedro Calloni – mixing
- Dale Becker – mastering
- Conor Hedge – assistant mastering
- Fili Filizzola – assistant mastering
- Hector Vega – assistant mastering
- Mike "Frog" Griffith – production coordinator
- Chloe Clements – A&R
- Dahlia Ambach Caplin – A&R
- Joshua Berkman – A&R
