= Cross Country (Breland album) =

Studio album by Breland
- Released: September 9, 2022
- Genre: Country; R&B; hip hop; pop; gospel
- Length: 43:09
- Label: Bad Realm; Atlantic
- Producer: Derek George; Di Genius; Jacob Durrett; Noby Sidez; Julian Bunetta; Kyle Fishman; Marc Scibilia; Sam Sumser; Sean Ross; Sean Small; Tom Jordan; Torin Martinez; Zachary Manno

Breland chronology
Rage & Sorrow (2020)	Cross Country (2022)

Singles from Cross Country
- 1. "Cross Country" Released: February 26, 2021; 2. "Throw It Back" Released: June 4, 2021; 3. "Praise the Lord" Released: March 7, 2022; 4. "Natural" Released: June 14, 2022; 5. "Told You I Could Drink" Released: August 5, 2022; 6. "For What It's Worth" Released: October 17, 2022

Alternate cover

Singles from Cross Country: The Extra Mile
- 1. "Cowboy Don't" Released: August 25, 2023

Professional ratings
Review scores
Source	Rating
AllMusic	4/5 stars

Cross Country is the debut studio album by American musician Breland. It was released through Bad Realm Records and Atlantic Records on September 9, 2022. The album has been described as a blend of country, R&B, hip hop, pop and gospel genres, and features guest artists Keith Urban, Mickey Guyton, Thomas Rhett, Ingrid Andress and Lady A.

An extended edition was released on September 15, 2023, to celebrate the one year anniversary of the album and features six additional tracks.

== Background ==
The album was initially hinted for a June 2022 release.

== Promotion ==
The title track and lead single "Cross Country" was released on February 26, 2021 with a music video. An updated version featuring Mickey Guyton was released three weeks later on March 19, 2021. The Mickey Guyton version appears on the album instead of the original.

"Throw It Back" featuring Keith Urban was released on June 4, 2021, and serves as the second single from the album. Breland and Urban previously collaborated on "Out the Cage" from Urban's 2020 album The Speed of Now Part 1.

"Praise the Lord" was released as the third single on March 7, 2022 and features Thomas Rhett. It debuted at number 100 on the Billboard 200.

The album's fourth single, "Natural" was released on June 14, 2022.

Breland released "Told You I Could Drink" featuring Lady A on August 5, 2022 as the album's fifth single.

"For What It's Worth" and its music video was released on the same day as the album on September 9, 2022, and was Breland's first single to impact country radio on October 17, 2022.

== Track listing ==
Cross Country track listing
No.	Title	Writer(s)	Producer(s)	Length
1.	"Here for It" (featuring Ingrid Andress)	Daniel Breland; Ingrid Andress; Marc Scibilia; Derrick Southerland	Sam Sumser; Sean Small; Scibilia	3:03
2.	"County Line"	Breland; Kye Fleming; Dennis Morgan; Ashley Gorley; Sam Hunt; Small; Ernest Smith; Sumser	Small; Sumser	3:31
3.	"Praise the Lord" (featuring Thomas Rhett)	Breland; Julian Bunetta; David Garcia; Jacob Durrett; Jessie Jo Dillon; Kyle Fishman; Michael Hardy; Rocky Block; Thomas Rhett	Bunetta; Fishman; Durrett	2:40
4.	"Natural"	Breland; Sumser; Small; Cameron Bartolini; Robert Lange; Shania Twain	Sumser; Small	2:42
5.	"Told You I Could Drink" (featuring Lady A)	Breland; Zachary Manno; Charles Kelley	Sumser; Small; Manno	3:56
6.	"For What It's Worth"	Breland; Block; Durrett; Greylan James	Sumser; Small; Durrett	2:55
7.	"Happy Song"	Breland; Ryan Hurd; Small; Sumser	Small; Sumser	3:17
8.	"Growing Pains"	Bianca Atterberry; Breland; Stephen McGregor; Small; Sumser; Akil Kents	Di Genius; Small; Sumser	2:41
9.	"Throw It Back" (featuring Keith Urban)	Breland; Keith Urban; Sumser; Small	Sumser; Small	3:07
10.	"Thick"	Breland; Jonathan Yip; Ray Romulus; Jeremy Reeves; Ray Charles McCollough II; Sean Douglas	Sean Ross; Sumser; Small; Torin Martinez	2:26
11.	"Cross Country" (featuring Mickey Guyton)	Breland; Sumser; Small; Will Gittens; Mickey Guyton	Summer; Small	3:24
12.	"Good for You"	Breland; Tyler Braden; Small; Sumser	Small; Sumser	3:02
13.	"Don't Look at Me"	Derek George; Breland; Sumser; Small	George; Small; Sumser	3:18
14.	"Alone at the Ranch"	Breland; Tom Jordan; Mitch Thompson	Tom Jordan	3:07
Total length:				43:09

Cross Country: The Extra Mile extended track listing
No.	Title	Writer(s)	Producer(s)	Length
1.	"Cowboy Don't"	Breland; Manno; Haley Mae Campbell	Sumser; Small; Manno	2:42
2.	"Thirsty"	Breland; Sebastian Garcia; Autumn Buysse; Jared Griffin	Sumser; Small; Noby Sidez	2:13
3.	"Anniversary"	Breland; Sumser; Small; Hunt; Gorley	Sumser; Small	2:43
4.	"Cracks"	Breland; Marc Sciblia; Derek Southerland; Jon Green	Sumser; Small; Sciblia	3:39
5.	"Guilty Pleasure" (featuring Brittney Spencer)	Breland; Eric Arjes; Sasha Sloan	Sumser; Small; Arjes	3:12
6.	"The Extra Mile"	Breland; Sam Sumser; Sean Small; Caitlyn Smith	Sumser; Small	3:23
21.	"My Truck"	Breland; Troy Taylor; Kalvin Austin; Devon Barton; Edrick Miles; Tatiana Zeigler	Taylor; Kal V	2:38
22.	"Cross Country"	Breland; Sumser; Small; Gittens	Sumser; Small	3:26
23.	"For What It's Worth" (featuring Alana Springsteen)	Breland; Block; Durrett; James; Springsteen; Liz Rose	Sumser; Small; Durrett	2:56
24.	"My Truck (Remix)" (featuring Sam Hunt)	Breland; Taylor; Hunt; Austin; Barton; Miles; Zeigler	Taylor; Kal V	2:39

Sample credits

- "County Line" contains an interpolation of "Nobody", performed by Sylvia.
- "Natural" contains an interpolation of "Man! I Feel Like a Woman!", performed by Shania Twain.

== Charts ==
Chart performance for Cross Country
Chart (2022)	Peak position
US Billboard 200	143
US Top Country Albums (Billboard)	15

== Certifications ==
Certifications for Cross Country
Region	Certification	Certified units/sales
United States (RIAA)	Gold	500,000^{‡}
^{‡} Sales+streaming figures based on certification alone.

== Release history ==
Cross Country release history
Region	Date	Format	Label	Ref.
Various	September 9, 2022	Compact disc; digital download; streaming	Bad Realm; Atlantic	
Various	July 21, 2023	Vinyl	Bad Realm; Atlantic	
