= Renell =

Renell is a given name. Notable people with the name include:

- Renell Medrano (born 1992), American photographer
- Renell Wren (born 1995), American football nose tackle
