= Proof of Life (Joy Oladokun album) =

Studio album by Joy Oladokun
- Released: April 28, 2023
- Length: 47:44
- Labels: Amigo; Verve Forecast; Republic
- Producers: Court Clement; Dr. Luke; Mike Elizondo; Ian Fitchuk; Joy Oladokun; Rob Persaud; Alysa Vanderhym; Dan Wilson; Aron Wright

Joy Oladokun chronology
In Defense of My Own Happiness (2021)	Proof of Life (2023)	Observations from a Crowded Room (2024)

Singles from Proof of Life
- 1. "Keeping the Light On" Released: January 21, 2022; 2. "Purple Haze" Released: May 10, 2022; 3. "Sweet Symphony" Released: September 23, 2022; 4. "Changes" Released: February 17, 2023; 5. "We're All Gonna Die" Released: March 17, 2023; 6. "Taking Things for Granted" Released: April 21, 2023

Proof of Life is the fourth studio album and second major label album by American singer-songwriter Joy Oladokun. It was released on April 28, 2023, by Amigo Records, Verve Forecast Records, and Republic Records. The album has been supported by five singles released throughout 2022 and 2023. The album features guest appearances from Mt. Joy, Manchester Orchestra, Chris Stapleton, Maxo Kream, and Noah Kahan.

== Background ==
In a press release about the album, Oladokun said that she intended for the songs on Proof of Life to be "helpful anthems" and to resonate with "anybody who feels normal and needs a little musical boost to get through the day".

== Promotion ==
The album has been supported by five singles, two of which were released before the album was announced. The first single, "Keeping the Light On", was released on January 21, 2022. The second single, "Sweet Symphony" (featuring Chris Stapleton), was released on September 23, 2022. Of the song, Oladokun said that it was about "the vulnerability, the fear, and the ups and downs that come from loving someone." The third single, "Changes", was released on February 17, 2023, simultaneously with the album announcement. The fourth single, "We're All Gonna Die" (with Noah Kahan), was released on March 17, 2023. The fifth and final single, "Taking Things for Granted", was released on April 21, 2023. On October 13, 2023, a deluxe edition was released to digital retailers featuring two of the tracks exclusive to the physical edition ("Spotlight" and previously released single "Purple Haze") as well as two new songs and four "Living Proof" alternate versions of the album's songs (named after the album's promotional tour).

== Critical reception ==
Writing for The Line of Best Fit, Sam Franzini rated Proof of Life a 7 out of 10, and concluded his review by writing that the album is "a warm, insightful record [that is] able to look towards the future without yet grieving the world we live in now."

== Track listing ==
Proof of Life physical standard track listing
No.	Title	Writer(s)	Producer(s)	Length
1.	"Keeping the Light On"	Olubukola Oladokun; Mike Elizondo; Ian Fitchuk	Fitchuk; Elizondo; Joy Oladokun^{[c]}	3:44
2.	"Changes"	Oladokun; Dan Wilson	Wilson; Oladokun	3:10
3.	"Taking Things for Granted"	Oladokun	Oladokun; Aaron Steele^{[a]}; Elliott Skinner^{[a]}	3:36
4.	"Somebody Like Me"	Oladokun	Oladokun	3:56
5.	"Friends" (with Mt. Joy)	Oladokun; Matt Quinn	Oladokun; Elizondo	3:21
6.	"Purple Haze"	Oladokun; Mike Elizondo; Lukasz Gottwald	Oladokun; Dr. Luke	3:25
7.	"Spotlight"	Oladokun; Ian Fitchuk; Mike Elizondo	Fitchuk; Elizondo	3:15
8.	"You at the Table" (with Manchester Orchestra)	Oladokun	Oladokun; Steele^{[a]}	3:51
9.	"Sweet Symphony" (featuring Chris Stapleton)	Oladokun; Fitchuk; Shae Jacobs	Fitchuk; Oladokun; Elizondo	3:48
10.	"The Hard Way"	Oladokun; Madi Diaz; Alysa Vanderheym	Vanderheym; Oladokun	4:01
11.	"Trying"	Oladokun	Oladokun	3:56
12.	"Pride"	Oladokun; Konrad Snyder; Aron Wright	Wright; Oladokun; Snyder	3:22
13.	"Revolution" (with Maxo Kream)	Oladokun; Emekwanem Biosah Jr.; Elizondo; Fitchuk; Amy Wadge		4:05
14.	"We're All Gonna Die" (with Noah Kahan)	Oladokun; James Droll; Fitchuk; Noah Kahan	Court Clement; Fitchuk; Oladokun	2:59
15.	"Flowers"	Oladokun; Elizondo; Atia Boggs	Oladokun; Elizondo	3:49
16.	"Somehow"	Oladokun	Oladokun	3:55
Total length:				58:13

Proof of Life digital standard track listing
No.	Title	Writer(s)	Producer(s)	Length
1.	"Keeping the Light On"	Oladokun; Elizondo; Fitchuk	Fitchuk; Elizondo; Oladokun^{[c]}	3:44
2.	"Changes"	Oladokun; Wilson	Wilson; Oladokun	3:10
3.	"Taking Things for Granted"	Oladokun	Oladokun; Steele^{[a]}; Skinner^{[a]}	3:36
4.	"Somebody Like Me"	Oladokun	Oladokun	3:56
5.	"Friends" (with Mt. Joy)	Oladokun; Matt Quinn	Oladokun; Elizondo	3:21
6.	"You at the Table" (with Manchester Orchestra)	Oladokun	Oladokun; Steele^{[a]}	3:51
7.	"Sweet Symphony" (featuring Chris Stapleton)	Oladokun; Fitchuk; Jacobs	Fitchuk; Oladokun; Elizondo	3:48
8.	"Trying"	Oladokun	Oladokun	3:56
9.	"Pride"	Oladokun; Snyder; Wright	Wright; Oladokun; Snyder	3:22
10.	"Revolution" (with Maxo Kream)	Oladokun; Biosah; Elizondo; Fitchuk; Wadge		4:05
11.	"The Hard Way"	Oladokun; Diaz; Vanderheym	Vanderheym; Oladokun	4:01
12.	"We're All Gonna Die" (with Noah Kahan)	Oladokun; Droll; Fitchuk; Kahan	Clement; Fitchuk; Oladokun	2:59
13.	"Somehow"	Oladokun	Oladokun	3:55
Total length:				47:44

Proof of Life digital deluxe edition bonus tracks
No.	Title	Writer(s)	Producer(s)	Length
1.	"Purple Haze"	Oladokun; Elizondo; Gottwald	Oladokun; Dr. Luke	3:25
2.	"Black Car"	Oladokun	Oladokun; Snyder	2:51
3.	"Somehow Intro" (Living Proof version)	Oladokun	Oladokun	1:24
4.	"Somehow" (Living Proof version)	Oladokun	Oladokun	2:14
5.	"Wild Enough"	Oladokun	Oladokun; Snyder	2:46
6.	"Spotlight"	Oladokun; Fitchuk; Elizondo	Fitchuk; Elizondo	3:15
7.	"Keeping the Light On" (Living Proof version)	Oladokun; Fitchuk; Elizondo	Oladokun; Rob Persaud	3:12
8.	"Sweet Symphony" (Living Proof version) (featuring Chris Stapleton)	Oladokun; Fitchuk; Jacobs	Oladokun	3:45
Total length:				70:35

Note

- ^{^[c]} signifies a co-producer.
- ^{^[a]} signifies an additional producer.

== Personnel ==
Track numbers reference digital standard edition

Musicians

- Joy Oladokun – vocals (all tracks); bass guitar (tracks 2, 3), ukulele (2)
- Ian Fitchuk – drums (1, 7, 11, 12), Wurlitzer electric piano (1, 7, 10), acoustic guitar (1, 10, 12), electric guitar (1, 12); background vocals, percussion (1); Hammond B3 (7, 10), piano (7), conga (10), bass guitar (11, 12), keyboards (12)
- Mike Elizondo – bass guitar (1, 7, 10); drum programming, synthesizer (1, 10); electric guitar (7, 10); lap steel guitar, piano (10)
- Sara Mulford – background vocals, piano, Rhodes, synthesizer (2)
- Aaron Sterling – drums, percussion (2)
- Dan Wilson – harmonium (2)
- Alex Budman – saxophone, tenor saxophone (2)
- Elliott Skinner – bass guitar (3)
- Aaron Steele – drums (3, 6)
- The McCrary Sisters – background vocals (4)
- Mt. Joy – vocals (5)
- Manchester Orchestra – vocals (6)
- Max Townsley – acoustic guitar, electric guitar (7)
- Rob Moose – string arrangement, viola, violin (7)
- Chris Stapleton – vocals (7)
- Jordan Lehning – string arrangement (8, 12, 13), strings (8, 13)
- Maxo Kream – vocals (10)
- Court Clement – acoustic guitar, electric guitar, keyboards, programming, whistle (12)
- Austin Hoke – cello (12)
- Ben Plotnick – viola (12)
- Alicia Enstrom – principal violin (12)
- Kristin Weber – violin (12)
- Noah Kahan – vocals (12)

Technical

- Adam Grover – mastering
- Pedro Calloni – mixing (1, 3, 4, 6, 7, 10)
- Konrad Snyder – mixing (2, 5, 8, 9, 11, 13)
- Rob Kinelski – mixing (12)
- Justin Francis – engineering (1, 10)
- Sara Mulford – engineering (2)
- Alex Wilder – engineering assistance (1, 10)
- Erica Block – engineering assistance (1, 10)

== Charts ==
Chart performance for Proof of Life
Chart (2023)	Peak position
UK Americana Albums (Official Charts)	25
US Heatseekers Albums (Billboard)	19
US Top Album Sales (Billboard)	96

== Release history ==
Release dates and formats for Proof of Life
Region	Date	Format	Version	Label	Ref.
Various	April 28, 2023	CD; LP; Digital download; streaming	Standard	Amigo; Verve Forecast; Republic	
Various	October 13, 2023	digital download; streaming	Deluxe	Amigo; Verve Forecast; Republic	
