= Breland (singer) =

American rapper

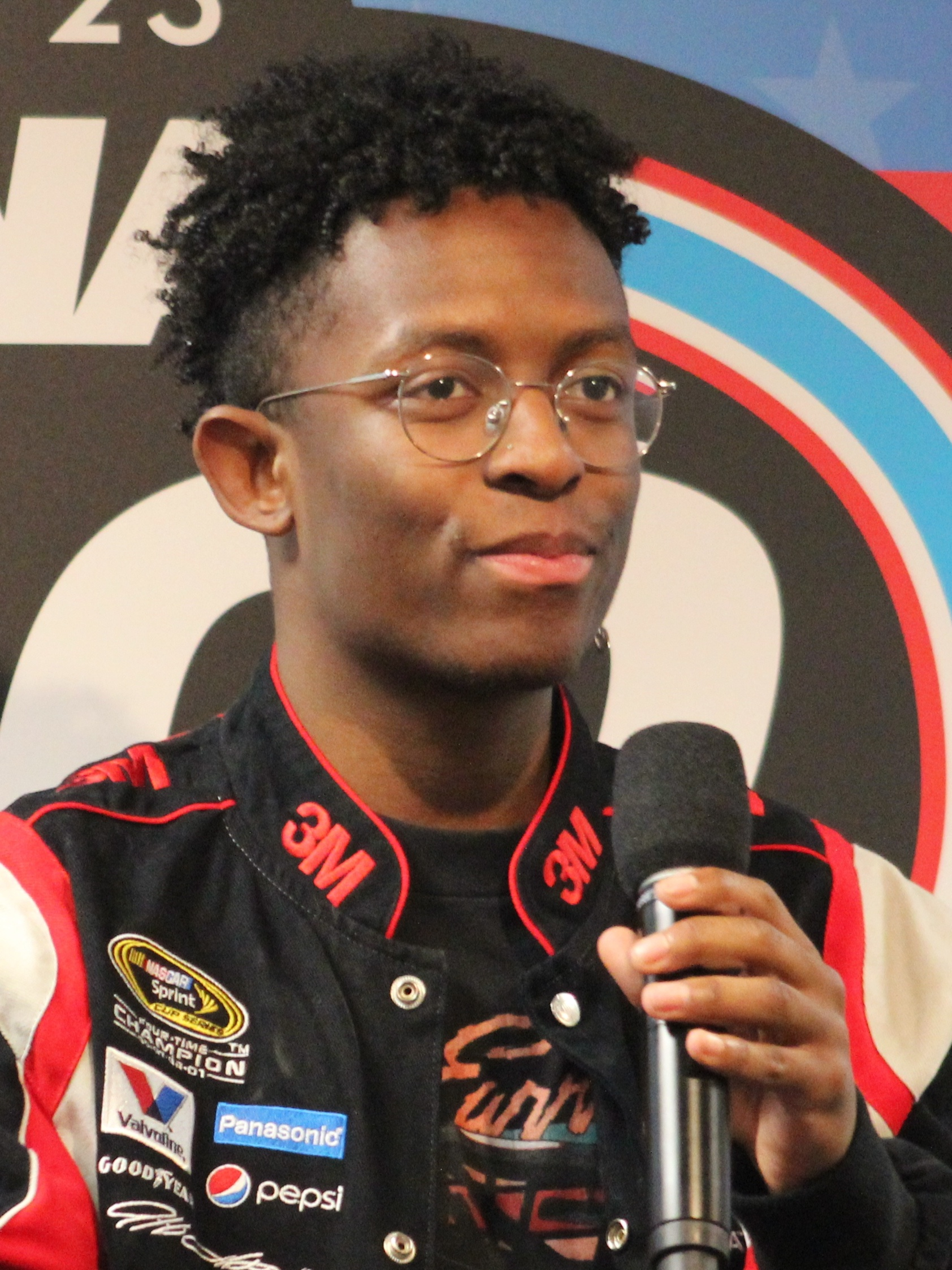
- Breland at Daytona International Speedway in 2023

Background information
- Born: Daniel Gerard Breland; July 18, 1995 (age 31); Burlington Township, New Jersey, U.S.
- Genres: Hip hop; country rap; R&B; gospel; soul
- Occupations: Rapper; singer; songwriter; record producer
- Years active: 2019–present
- Labels: Bad Realm; Atlantic; Warner Music Nashville
- Website: brelandmusic.com

Daniel Gerard Breland (born July 18, 1995), known mononymously as Breland (/ˈbriːlənd/ BREE-lənd; stylized in all caps), is an American rapper, singer, songwriter and record producer of a hybrid of country, hip-hop, R&B, gospel, and soul music. His 2019 debut single, "My Truck", rose to prominence the following year after gaining popular attention via social media, reaching No. 26 on Billboard's Hot Country Songs chart, and was remixed with Sam Hunt before being certified platinum for sales of one million units as of January 2021.

Breland has so far released two EPs and one album on Bad Realm/Atlantic Records, and his music been streamed on Spotify over 150 million times. He released his first full-length album, Cross Country, in September 2022.

== Early life and education ==
Breland grew up in Burlington Township, New Jersey, the son of ordained ministers Tonya and Gerard Breland, who filled their home with gospel music. At age 14, he entered the Peddie School, a New Jersey boarding school, and was exposed for the first time to secular music in the hip-hop, R&B, country and pop genres. His favorites were ’70s soul artists such as Aretha Franklin and Stevie Wonder.

Breland started writing his own songs, a mix of styles he was listening to and liked. He turned down admission to New York University's Clive Davis Institute of Recorded Music to study business at Georgetown University in Washington, DC. While there, he sang and arranged a cappella with a group called the Phantoms and was also a residential advisor.

== Musical career ==
=== 2019-2022 ===
Breland began his career as a professional songwriter while at Georgetown, and in his second year, he met rapper Chinx (Chinx Drugz), an associate of French Montana. One night at Chinx's Far Rockaway, New York home, the rapper left Breland working on music to go perform at his show. He never came back, as Chinx was murdered.

After graduation, he moved to Atlanta. While working a job selling language technology during the day, he wrote music usually until late into the morning hours. Breland taught himself how to produce music on Pro Tools, Logic Pro, and FL Studio. With approximately 2,000 songs in around five years, he made placements with artists such as Trey Songz and wrote nearly half of the tracks on The Golden Child, the debut from Def Jam Recordings R&B artist YK Osiris.

Breland often posted his original material on Instagram. He started the #BrelandVerseChallenge on the app to engage his fans during COVID-19 quarantine. He ended up giving two of his Instagram followers their first major-label writing credit on the song "In the Woulds", an R&B and pop song featuring Chase Rice and Lauren Alaina, two country music artists. However, newcomer country rap artist Rvshvd was originally intended to be featured on "In the Woulds" before Chase Rice was added to the final version, despite this, he still received songwriting credits for it.

In September 2019, he wrote the song "My Truck", about the truck culture found in rural America. The music was a blend of hip hop and country music and when he posted the song on Instagram, he received a great response, and realized he had found his niche with the country-trap sub-genre.

"I just felt like it was time for people to change their perspective on what country music is and what country music can be, because there is an audience of country music listeners under 30 who believe Black Lives Matter," he told the Associated Press. "My Truck" reached No. 26 on the Billboard Hot Country Songs chart.

In an interview on the television program Extra at the time, Breland termed his musical hybrid sound as cross country, while most media categorizes him as country-trap.

Signing with Bad Realm/Atlantic Records, Breland signed with SALXCO Management, and released a remix of "My Truck" that features country music's Sam Hunt. "My Truck" has over 2.6 million U.S. streams, 2,000 downloads sold and 2.8 million radio audience impressions, according to Nielsen Audio, and hit No. 1 on Spotify's Viral 50 Chart in February.

In May 2020, Breland's self-titled EP was released by Bad Realm/Atlantic Records. The music crossed genres of country, hip hop, R&B, and pop with songs like the singles "My Truck" and "Horseride", as well as fan favorites "Hot Sauce" and "In the Woulds." Producers included Sam Sumser (Lizzo, Jason Derulo), Sean Small (Lizzo, Usher), Charlie Handsome (Post Malone, Kanye West, Khalid), as well as country singers Mitchell Tenpenny and Walker Hayes. The EP charted at No. 48 on Billboard's Top Country Albums chart.

The EP Rage & Sorrow followed with a June 2020 release. Breland's theme on the EP was derived from the racial unrest prompted by the murders of George Floyd and Ahmaud Arbery, and the killing of Breonna Taylor. "Intro" features a line from the 1960s blues song "Tobacco Road", and has a rock guitar. Other songs include "Real Men Don't Cry", and "A Message". Producers include Carson Thatcher (Parson James, Andy Grammer), Brian Kennedy, and Rob Persaud.

Breland and Keith Urban co-wrote two songs for Urban's September 2020 album The Speed of Now Part 1, including the song "Out the Cage" that has Breland adding vocals, and Nile Rodgers's on rhythm guitar, and the track "Soul Food".

In September 2020, Breland joined Apple Music Country as an on-air host for his own radio show called Land of the Bre.

Breland released a brand new collaboration with Thomas Rhett "Praise the Lord" in March 2022. His debut album Cross Country was released on September 9, 2022.

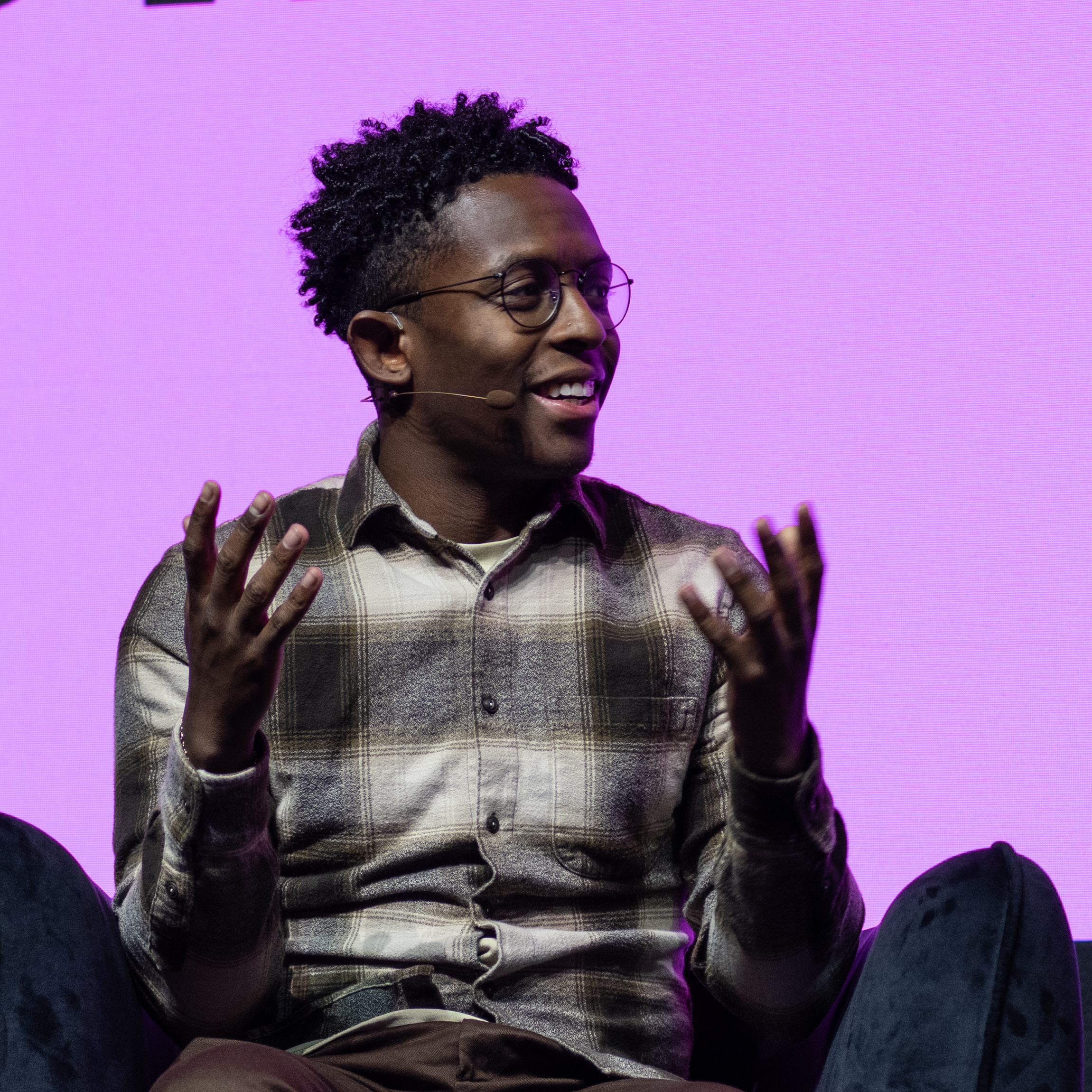
At SXSW London, 4 June 2025

=== 2023-present ===
In August 2023, Breland released a new single, "Cowboy Don't". In 2024, he appeared in the country music documentary Rebel Country.

"One Door Closes", a collaboration with British singer/songwriter Ella Henderson, was released on 21 March 2025.

== Discography ==
=== Studio albums ===
List of studio albums, with selected details and chart positions
Title	Details	Peak chart positions		Certifications
Title	Details	US	US Country	Certifications
Cross Country	Released: September 9, 2022; Label: Bad Realm/Atlantic; Formats: CD, LP, digital download, streaming	143	15	RIAA: Gold

=== Extended plays ===
List of EPs, with selected chart positions, showing other relevant details
Title	Details	Peak chart positions	
Title	Details	US Country	US Heat
Breland	Released: May 22, 2020; Label: Bad Realm/Atlantic; Formats: Digital download, streaming	48	15
Rage & Sorrow	Released: June 19, 2020; Label: Bad Realm/Atlantic; Formats: Digital download, streaming	—	—
Breland & Friends: Vol. 1 (Live)	Released: January 26, 2024; Label: Bad Realm/Atlantic; Formats: Digital download, streaming	—	—
Project 2024	Released: October 18, 2024; Label: Bald Realm/Atlantic; Formats: CD, digital download, streaming	—	—

=== Singles ===
List of singles, with selected chart positions and certifications, showing other relevant details
Title	Year	Peak chart positions						Certifications	Album
Title	Year	US	US Country Songs	US Country Airplay	US R&B /HH	CAN	UK	Certifications	Album
"My Truck"	2019	92	24	—	46	95	—	RIAA: 2× Platinum; MC: 2× Platinum	Breland
"Horseride"	2020	—	—	—	—	—	—		Breland
"Cross Country" (solo or featuring Mickey Guyton)	2021	—	—	—	—	—	—		Cross Country
"Throw It Back" (featuring Keith Urban)	2021	—	38	—	—	— (Note: "Throw It Back" did not enter the Billboard Canadian Hot 100, but peaked at number 42 on the Hot Canadian Digital Song Sales chart.)	—	RIAA: Gold	Cross Country
"High Horse" (with Nelly and Blanco Brown)	2021	—	— (Note: "High Horse" did not enter the Billboard Hot Country Songs chart, but peaked at number 15 on the Country Digital Song Sales chart.)	—	—	—	—		Heartland
"Praise the Lord" (featuring Thomas Rhett)	2022	100	21	—	—	—	—	RIAA: Gold	Cross Country
"Natural"	2022	— (Note: "Natural" did not enter the Billboard Hot 100, but peaked at number 18 on the Bubbling Under Hot 100 Singles chart.)	34	—	—	—	—		Cross Country
"Told You I Could Drink" (featuring Lady A)	2022	— (Note: "Told You I Could Drink" did not enter the Billboard Hot 100, but peaked at number eight on the Bubbling Under Hot 100 Singles chart.)	28	—	—	—	—		Cross Country
"For What It's Worth"	2022	— (Note: "For What It's Worth" did not enter the Billboard Hot 100, but peaked at number six on the Bubbling Under Hot 100 Singles chart.)	28	52	—	—	—	RIAA: Gold	Cross Country
"Cowboy Don't"	2023	—	—	—	—	—	— (Note: "Cowboy Don't" did not enter the UK Singles Chart, but peaked at number 89 on the UK Official Singles Sales Chart.)		Cross Country
"Alcohol" (with X Ambassadors)	2023	—	—	—	—	—	—		Non-album singles
"Heartbreak & Alcohol"	2024	—	—	—	—	—	—		Non-album singles
"Boots Don't" (with Shania Twain)	2024	—	—	—	—	—	—		Twisters: The Album
"Icing"	2024	—	—	—	—	—	—		Project 2024
"One Door Closes" (with Ella Henderson)	2025	—	—	—	—	—	—		TBA

=== Featured singles ===
List of singles, with selected chart positions
Title	Year	Peak chart positions					Certifications	Album
Title	Year	US	US Country Songs	US Country Airplay	CAN	CAN Country	Certifications	Album
"Beers on Me" (Dierks Bentley featuring Breland and Hardy)	2021	40	5	1	61	2	RIAA: 2× Platinum	Non-album singles
"3 (ESPN+ UFC 264 Anthem)" (Scott Storch featuring Breland)	2021	—	—	—	—	—		Non-album singles

== Awards and nominations ==
=== CMT Music Awards ===
Year	Nominee / work	Award	Result	Ref.
2022	"Cross Country"	Breakthrough Video of the Year	Nominated	
2022	"Friendship Train" (with Gladys Knight and Mickey Guyton)	CMT Performance of the Year	Nominated	
2022	"Ride wit Me" (with Nelly, Kane Brown and Blanco Brown)	CMT Performance of the Year	Nominated	

=== GMA Dove Awards ===
Year	Nominee / work	Award	Result	Ref.
2022	"Sunday" (Note: Lake was credited as a co-writer on "Sunday" by Koryn Hawthorne.) (Koryn Hawthorne)	Contemporary Gospel Recorded Song of the Year	Pending	

== Guest appearances ==
List of non-single guest appearances, with other performing artists, showing year released and album name
Year	Title	Artist(s)	Album
2020	"Ol Girl Interlude"	DJ Luke Nasty	Highway Music 2
2020	"Out the Cage"	Keith Urban, Nile Rodgers	The Speed of Now Part 1
2021	"Miles"	Tiera	Tiera EP
2021	"All I See"	Gary LeVox	One on One EP
2021	"Somebody"	Jimmie Allen, Lathan Warlick	Bettie James Gold Edition
2022	"Shared Walls"	Tenille Townes	Masquerades EP
2023	"Inhale/Exhale AIR"	Shania Twain	Queen of Me (Royal Edition)
