= Throw It Back (Breland song) =

Single by Breland featuring Keith Urban

from the album Cross Country
- Released: June 4, 2021
- Genre: Country; Country rap
- Length: 3:08
- Label: Bad Realm; Atlantic
- Songwriters: Daniel Breland; Keith Urban; Sam Sumser; Sean Small
- Producers: Sam Sumser; Sean Small

Breland singles chronology
"Cross Country" (2021)	"Throw It Back" (2021)	"Praise the Lord" (2021)

Keith Urban singles chronology
"Love Songs Ain't for Us" (2021)	"Throw It Back" (2021)	"Wild Hearts" (2021)

Music video
- "Throw It Back" on YouTube

"Throw It Back" is a country music song by Breland featuring Keith Urban. Sam Sumser and Sean Small produced the song, which was written by Breland, Keith Urban, Sam Sumser, and Sean Small. The song was released through Bad Realm and Atlantic Records on June 4, 2021, as the second single from Breland's debut album Cross Country.

== Background ==
Breland met Keith Urban in the summer of 2020 and they began working on the song. "Throw It Back" was the first song that Breland and Urban worked on together, but they released "Out the Cage" first from Urban's eleventh album The Speed of Now Part 1.

== Release and reception ==
The song was released on June 4, 2021 alongside a music video. On August 14, 2021, the song debuted on the Billboard Hot Country Songs chart, where it remained for fifteen weeks, peaking at number thirty-eight. The song was one of the most popular songs on Amazon Music's Country Heat playlist in 2021.

Breland and Urban were highlighted artists in the 2022 edition of the Country Music Hall of Fame's "American Currents" exhibit.

== Charts ==
Chart performance for "Throw It Back"
Chart (2021)	Peak position
US Hot Country Songs (Billboard)	38

"Throw It Back" did not enter the Billboard Canadian Hot 100, but peaked at number 42 on the Hot Canadian Digital Song Sales chart.

== Certifications ==
Region	Certification	Certified units/sales
United States (RIAA)	Gold	500,000^{‡}
^{‡} Sales+streaming figures based on certification alone.
