= Observations from a Crowded Room =

Studio album by Joy Oladokun
- Released: October 18, 2024
- Length: 43:42
- Labels: Amigo; Verve Forecast; Republic
- Producer: Joy Oladokun

Joy Oladokun chronology
Proof of Life (2023)	Observations from a Crowded Room (2024)	Hope Is a Heavy Thing (2026)

This album became a way for me to write things, feel things, [and] process things [...] [b]ecause, as the producer, I just had to sit with these songs for so long. It became really healing in a sense of, 'I made this. I'm listening to an album that I genuinely love. All the sounds and bits and bobs came from me with the help of just an engineer.' It was transformative. So, it started out as, 'I quit,' and it has ended up as a fresh start.

— Joy Oladokun, on the creation process of Observations from a Crowded Room

Observations from a Crowded Room is the fifth studio album and third major label album by the American singer-songwriter Joy Oladokun. It was released on October 18, 2024, by Amigo Records, Verve Forecast Records, and Republic Records. The album was written and produced entirely by Oladokun.

== Composition ==
Consequence of Sound wrote that Observations from a Crowded Room features Oladokun's signature folk-pop sound with influences of electronic and psychedelic music. Billboard noted additional influences of hip-hop in "Hollywood" and pop in "Strong Ones".

== Promotion ==
The album was supported by the release of four singles. The lead single, "Questions, Chaos & Faith", was released on April 19, 2024. The song is a tribute to a childhood friend of Oladokun, Casey Hayes, who died while Oladokun was attending college. In an interview with Atwood Magazine, Oladokun revealed that she wrote the song alone within a two-week period and the process served as an emotional outlet for navigating through her grief. WFPK in Louisville, Kentucky featured it as their Song of the Week for April 25, 2024. The second single, "Drugs", was released on July 19, 2024. In a press relesase, Oladokun said that she wrote the song "about feeling like my vices weren't vice-ing hard enough", further elaborating: "I think it became really easy for me to medicate my anxiety or anger or disillusionment instead of addressing those things head on. This is song is about realizing that and finding a new way to get by." The third and fourth singles, "No Country" and "I'd Miss the Birds", respectively, were released on September 13, 2024.

== Track listing ==
Observations from a Crowded Room track listing
No.	Title	Length
1.	"Letter from a Blackbird"	2:13
2.	"Am I?"	3:16
3.	"Observation #1"	1:03
4.	"Strong Ones"	2:29
5.	"Drugs"	3:23
6.	"Questions, Chaos & Faith"	3:57
7.	"No Country"	4:17
8.	"Observation #2"	1:08
9.	"Hollywood"	3:27
10.	"Flowers"	3:44
11.	"Dust/Divinity"	3:43
12.	"Good Enough"	3:29
13.	"Observation #3"	1:24
14.	"I'd Miss the Birds"	3:09
15.	"Goodbye"	3:00
Total length:		43:42

Notes

- All titles are stylized in uppercase with the exception of "Flowers", which is stylized in lowercase.
- "Hollywood" features uncredited additional vocals from Brian Brown.
