= Praise the Lord (Breland song) =

Single by Breland featuring Thomas Rhett

from the album Cross Country
- Released: March 7, 2022
- Genre: Country; R&B; Blues; Christian
- Length: 2:40
- Label: Bad Realm; Atlantic
- Songwriters: Daniel Breland; Julian Bunetta; David Garcia; Jacob Durrett; Jessie Jo Dillon; Kyle Fishman; Michael Hardy; Rocky Block; Thomas Rhett
- Producers: Julian Bunetta; Kyle Fishman; Jacob Durrett

Breland singles chronology
"Throw It Back" (2021)	"Praise the Lord" (2022)	"Natural" (2022)

Thomas Rhett singles chronology
"Death Row" (2022)	"Praise the Lord" (2022)	"Where We Started" (2022)

"Praise the Lord" is a country music song by Breland featuring Thomas Rhett and is the third single from Breland's debut album Cross Country. It was released by Bad Realm and Atlantic Records on March 7, 2022, and debuted at number 100 on the Billboard Hot 100.

== Background ==
The song was written by Breland, Julian Bunetta, David Garcia, Jacob Durrett, Jessie Jo Dillon, Kyle Fishman, Hardy, and Thomas Rhett. Rhett stated that the first time he heard the song, he was dancing and throwing his hands in the air and that he was grateful that Breland allowed him to write a verse for the song. One set of lyrics says "Praise the Lord for east Atlanta, Country Grammar, and my nana," which references Nelly's 2000 album Country Grammar.

== Release and reception ==
Breland played the song on the road for about a year prior to its release. In February 2022, Breland posted a teaser of the song to TikTok which received over 160.1K likes and 964.5K views in less than twenty-four hours. The song debuted at number 100 on the Billboard Hot 100. The song premiered on the US Billboard Hot Country chart on March 19, 2022. The song spent eight weeks on the charts, peaking at number twenty-one on March 26, 2022.

Taste of Country wrote that the song is "a groovy, upbeat tribute to the simple things that make a country life worth living."

== Performances ==
On April 12, 2022, Breland and Rhett performed the duet at a sold-out Breland & Friends benefit concert for the Oasis Center at the Ryman Auditorium. On April 11, 2022, Breland performed the song at the CMT Music Awards.

Breland also performed the song at Stagecoach Festival on April 29, 2022.

Breland and Thomas Rhett also performed the song live at the 2022 Academy of Country Music Awards.

== Charts ==
The song also debuted on the Billboard Country Streaming Songs chart on March 26, 2022, remaining on the chart for five weeks and peaking at number 20.

=== Weekly charts ===
Chart performance for "Praise the Lord"
Chart (2022)	Peak position
US Billboard Hot 100	100
US Hot Country Songs (Billboard)	21

=== Year-end charts ===
2022 year-end chart performance for "Praise the Lord"
Chart (2022)	Position
US Hot Country Songs (Billboard)	78

== Certification ==
Certification for "Praise the Lord"
Region	Certification	Certified units/sales
United States (RIAA)	Gold	500,000^{‡}
^{‡} Sales+streaming figures based on certification alone.
