= Look at My Life =

Single by Gracie Abrams

from the album Daughter from Hell
- Released: June 25, 2026
- Length: 3:10
- Label: Interscope
- Songwriters: Gracie Abrams; Aaron Dessner
- Producers: Gracie Abrams; Aaron Dessner; Dan Nigro

Gracie Abrams singles chronology
"Hit the Wall" (2026)	"Look at My Life" (2026)	"Good Reason" (2026)

"Look at My Life" is a song by American singer-songwriter Gracie Abrams from her third studio album, Daughter from Hell. It was released on June 25, 2026, through Interscope Records. Abrams wrote and produced the song alongside Aaron Dessner.

== Background ==
In an interview with People on January 7, 2026, Abrams teased her upcoming third studio album, saying that she was "beyond ready for [the album] to belong to everyone else". She said she had "never felt this way about anything" she had made before, which was "driving [her] crazy". Regarding the anticipation surrounding the album, she said she "loved the feeling" but also felt "kind of calm" about it, instead appreciating the time she had spent with the record and the people she worked with.

In March 2026, Abrams regularly shared glimpses on her Instagram, including photos of herself, moments with collaborators like Aaron Dessner and Bella Blasko, and a leather-bound journal marked with the number "3" and a sticker reading "witch". On April 20, she posted a small portion of a song playing on her phone to her Instagram.

== Release and commentary ==
"Look at My Life" was released on June 25, 2026. The single shares the name of Abrams's upcoming tour supporting her third album.

The song describes the personal struggles relating to life lessons while also experiencing mental burnout and social withdrawal, in part due to growing fame. Abrams described the song as a personal reflection during a pensive period in her life while she was attending Barnard College. The New York Times described the single as Abrams "[daring] to express at least a passing dissatisfaction with the trappings of fame".

== Music video ==
Abrams also released a music video, which depicts Abrams on a road trip to a rural town before taking off in a hot air balloon. Mitch Ryan directed the music video. MSN described the music video as Abrams "drifting through a series of increasingly surreal Americana tableaux".

In the music video, Abrams travels through an empty dance studio, a convenience store parking lot, and traverses a rural landscape. At the same time, a massive dumpster fire burns behind her. Later, she shatters a room full of mirrors, shattering her own reflection with a baseball bat. By the video's end, she floats away in a hot air balloon.

== Charts ==
=== Weekly charts ===
Weekly chart performance
Chart (2026)	Peak position
Australia (ARIA)	32
Canada Hot 100 (Billboard)	38
Croatia International Airplay (Top lista)	33
Estonia Airplay (TopHit)	77
Germany Airplay (MusicTrace)	23
Global 200 (Billboard)	86
Ireland (IRMA)	42
Japan Hot Overseas (Billboard Japan)	19
Latvia Airplay (LaIPA)	15
Moldova Airplay (TopHit)	44
Netherlands (Single Tip)	18
New Zealand Hot Singles (RMNZ)	2
Portugal Airplay (AFP)	94
Slovakia Airplay (ČNS IFPI)	38
UK Singles (Official Charts)	39
US Billboard Hot 100	54

=== Monthly charts ===
Monthly chart performance
Chart (2026)	Peak position
Estonia Airplay (TopHit)	97
