= I Don't Know How but They Found Me! (album) =

Studio album by Jensen McRae
- Released: April 25, 2025
- Length: 33:44
- Label: Dead Oceans
- Producer: Brad Cook

Jensen McRae chronology
Are You Happy Now? (2022)	I Don't Know How but They Found Me! (2025)

Singles from I Don't Know How but They Found Me!
- 1. "Massachusetts" Released: June 11, 2024; 2. "Praying for Your Downfall" Released: February 19, 2025; 3. "Savannah" Released: March 20, 2025

I Don't Know How but They Found Me! is the second studio album by American folk-pop singer-songwriter Jensen McRae. It was released on April 25, 2025, via Dead Oceans.

== Background ==
Produced by Brad Cook, who recorded the album with McRae in North Carolina, the album centers on McRae's reflection on past relationships, deviating from its "coming of age"-themed predecessor, Are You Happy Now?. "Praying for Your Downfall" was released as the album's lead single on February 19, 2025.

== Reception ==
Professional ratings
Review scores
Source	Rating
DIY	4.5/5 stars
Dork	4/5 stars
Hot Press	8.5/10
Pitchfork	7.3/10
Spectrum Culture	68%

Referring to several songs such as "I Can Change Him" and "Let Me Be Wrong", DIY's Sarah Jamieson remarked, "these are a set of songs that examine all the broken pieces of her love stories and point the finger in everyone's direction," giving the album a rating of 4.5 stars.

The album received a rating of four from Dork reviewer Felicity Newton, who described it as "a record that's both timeless and perfectly timed" and "the work of an artist who's mastered the art of turning personal history into shared experience." Pitchfork's Olivia Horn rated the album 7.3, noting "not everything is quite so grim" and "the bright, nostalgic pop palette McRae deploys across the album to help counterbalance its weightier material."

It was given a rating score of 68% by Spectrum Culture, which commented, "Thematically, the album leans into the idea of imperfections. Thus, the tracks that lyrically and sonically capture the romantic notion of flaws are destined to have a lasting effect." Writing for Hot Press with a rating of 8.5, Caroline Kelly opined, "Driving a heavy force of heartbreak and rebuilding, I Don't Know How finds the singer at the intersection where Taylor Swift's Red and Joni Mitchell's Blue collide."

== Track listing ==
I Don't Know How but They Found Me! track listing
No.	Title	Writer(s)	Length
1.	"The Rearranger"	Jensen McRae; Grant Averill; Joe London	2:48
2.	"I Can Change Him"	McRae; Averill; Mags Duval; Robin Lerner; Annie Roboff; Beth Nielsen Chapman	3:37
3.	"Savannah"	McRae	3:24
4.	"Daffodils"	McRae	2:35
5.	"Let Me Be Wrong"	McRae; Andrew Seltzer	2:36
6.	"Novelty"	McRae; Averill; London	2:34
7.	"I Don't Do Drugs"	McRae	2:19
8.	"Tuesday"	McRae; Jake Wesley Rogers	2:46
9.	"Mother Wound"	McRae; Averill; London	2:22
10.	"Praying for Your Downfall"	McRae; Sam de Jong	3:05
11.	"Massachusetts"	McRae; Mary Weitz	3:38
Total length:			33:44

== Personnel ==
Credits adapted from the album's liner notes.

=== Musicians ===
- Jensen McRae – vocals (all tracks), lead acoustic guitar (tracks 2, 3), acoustic guitar (5)
- Joe London – drums, programming, background vocals (1, 6); guitars, keyboards (1)
- Grant Averill – bass, background vocals (1, 6); guitars (1)
- Holden McRae – piano (2–11); Mellotron, Moog pad (8)
- Nathan Stocker – rhythm acoustic guitar (2, 3), electric guitar (3–5, 7–11), acoustic guitar (4, 6, 7, 10, 11); banjo, programming, synthesizer (4); Moog pad (8)
- Matt McCaughan – drums (2–5, 9–11), percussion (2–5, 9, 10)
- Brad Cook – bass (2–5, 7, 9–11); electric guitar, software synthesizer, drum programming (9)

=== Technical and visuals ===
- Joe London – production (1, 6), engineering (1)
- Grant Averill – production (1, 6)
- Brad Cook – production (2–11), engineering (6–10)
- Sam de Jong – production (10)
- Paul Voran – engineering (2–11)
- Andrew Sarlo – mixing (1–10)
- Chris Tabron – mixing (11)
- Kari Estes – mixing (11)
- Dale Becker – mastering (1–10)
- Dave Kutch – mastering (11)
- Kegn Venegas – mastering assistance (1–10)
- Katie Harvey – mastering assistance (1–10)
- Noah McCorkle – mastering assistance (1–10)
- Nick Scott – creative direction, design
- Alexa Terfloth – additional design
- Bao Ngo – photography
