= The Look at My Life Tour =

Upcoming concert tour by Gracie Abrams

- Tour by Gracie Abrams
- Promotional poster
- Location: Europe; North America; Australia
- Associated album: Daughter from Hell
- Start date: December 2, 2026
- End date: August 6, 2027
- No. of shows: 71
- Supporting acts: Arlo Parks; Ashe; Bella Kay; Charlotte Lawrence; Del Water Gap; girlsweetvoiced; Grace Ives; Holly Humberstone; Jake Minch; The Japanese House; Jensen McRae; Rachel Chinouriri; Samia

Gracie Abrams concert chronology
- The Secret of Us Tour (2024–2025); The Look at My Life Tour (2026–2027)

The Look at My Life Tour is the upcoming fifth concert tour by American singer-songwriter Gracie Abrams, in support of her third studio album Daughter from Hell (2026). The tour will begin on December 2, 2026 in Denver, Colorado, United States, and is set to conclude on August 6, 2027 in Sydney, New South Wales, Australia.

== Background ==
On May 11, 2026, Abrams announced her third studio album, Daughter from Hell, which was released on July 17. The lead single for the album, "Hit the Wall", was released on May 14.

Abrams announced the tour on May 28, 2026. It consists of 37 shows in North America, and 27 shows in Europe.

For the North American dates, a presale was scheduled for June 2, with a general sale on June 5. For the European dates, a presale for those who pre-order the album was scheduled for June 2, and a general sale on June 5.

The opening acts have been announced as Rachel Chinouriri, Holly Humberstone, Del Water Gap, Charlotte Lawrence, Grace Ives, Bella Kay, Jensen McRae, The Japanese House for the North American dates; and Samia and Jake Minch for the European dates.

In November 2026, Abrams added a show in Austin, Texas with Ashe and girlsweetvoiced announced as the opener. On November 15, Abrams announced six shows in Australia with Arlo Parks as the opener.

== Tour dates ==
List of 2026 concerts
Date (2026)	City	Country	Venue	Opening acts
December 2	Denver	United States	Ball Arena	Rachel Chinouriri
December 3	Denver	United States	Ball Arena	Rachel Chinouriri
December 6	Oakland	United States	Oakland Arena	Rachel Chinouriri
December 7	Oakland	United States	Oakland Arena	Rachel Chinouriri
December 9	Glendale	United States	Desert Diamond Arena	Rachel Chinouriri
December 10	Glendale	United States	Desert Diamond Arena	Rachel Chinouriri
December 14	Inglewood (Note: Labeled as Los Angeles in promotional material.)	United States	Kia Forum	Rachel Chinouriri
December 18	Inglewood	United States	Kia Forum	Holly Humberstone
December 19	Inglewood	United States	Kia Forum	Holly Humberstone
December 20	Inglewood	United States	Kia Forum	Holly Humberstone

List of 2027 concerts
Date (2027)	City	Country	Venue	Opening acts
January 26	Seattle	United States	Climate Pledge Arena	Del Water Gap
January 27	Seattle	United States	Climate Pledge Arena	Del Water Gap
January 29	Seattle	United States	Climate Pledge Arena	Del Water Gap
January 31	Portland	United States	Moda Center	Del Water Gap
February 1	Portland	United States	Moda Center	Del Water Gap
February 6	Austin	United States	Moody Center	Ashe girlsweetvoiced
February 11	Chicago	United States	United Center	Charlotte Lawrence
February 12	Chicago	United States	United Center	Charlotte Lawrence
February 14	Nashville	United States	Bridgestone Arena	Charlotte Lawrence
February 15	Nashville	United States	Bridgestone Arena	Charlotte Lawrence
February 18	Toronto	Canada	Scotiabank Arena	Grace Ives
February 19	Toronto	Canada	Scotiabank Arena	Grace Ives
February 23	Atlanta	United States	State Farm Arena	Grace Ives
February 24	Atlanta	United States	State Farm Arena	Grace Ives
February 26	Charlotte	United States	Spectrum Center	Grace Ives
February 27	Charlotte	United States	Spectrum Center	Grace Ives
March 1	Boston	United States	TD Garden	Grace Ives
March 2	Boston	United States	TD Garden	Grace Ives
March 4	Washington, D.C.	United States	Capital One Arena	Bella Kay
March 5	Washington, D.C.	United States	Capital One Arena	Bella Kay
March 8	Montreal	Canada	Bell Centre	Bella Kay
March 9	Montreal	Canada	Bell Centre	Bella Kay
March 12	Philadelphia	United States	Xfinity Mobile Arena	Jensen McRae
March 13	Philadelphia	United States	Xfinity Mobile Arena	Jensen McRae
March 16	Brooklyn	United States	Barclays Center	The Japanese House
March 17	Brooklyn	United States	Barclays Center	The Japanese House
March 19	Brooklyn	United States	Barclays Center	The Japanese House
March 20	Brooklyn	United States	Barclays Center	The Japanese House
April 8	Paris	France	Accor Arena	Samia
April 9	Paris	France	Accor Arena	Samia
April 12	Paris	France	Accor Arena	Samia
April 15	Antwerp	Belgium	AFAS Dome	Samia
April 16	Antwerp	Belgium	AFAS Dome	Samia
April 19	Dublin	Ireland	3Arena	Samia
April 20	Dublin	Ireland	3Arena	Samia
April 22	Manchester	England	Co-op Live	Samia
April 24	Manchester	England	Co-op Live	Samia
April 25	Manchester	England	Co-op Live	Samia
April 27	Glasgow	Scotland	OVO Hydro	Samia
April 28	Glasgow	Scotland	OVO Hydro	Samia
April 30	London	England	The O2 Arena	Samia
May 1	London	England	The O2 Arena	Samia
May 3	London	England	The O2 Arena	Samia
May 4	London	England	The O2 Arena	Samia
May 7	Amsterdam	Netherlands	Ziggo Dome	Jake Minch
May 8	Amsterdam	Netherlands	Ziggo Dome	Jake Minch
May 10	Amsterdam	Netherlands	Ziggo Dome	Jake Minch
May 12	Berlin	Germany	Uber Arena	Jake Minch
May 13	Berlin	Germany	Uber Arena	Jake Minch
May 18	Stockholm	Sweden	Avicii Arena	Jake Minch
May 19	Stockholm	Sweden	Avicii Arena	Jake Minch
May 23	Milan	Italy	Unipol Dome	Jake Minch
May 24	Milan	Italy	Unipol Dome	Jake Minch
May 27	Barcelona	Spain	Palau Sant Jordi	Jake Minch
May 28	Barcelona	Spain	Palau Sant Jordi	Jake Minch
July 27	Melbourne	Australia	Rod Laver Arena	Arlo Parks
July 28	Melbourne	Australia	Rod Laver Arena	Arlo Parks
July 30	Melbourne	Australia	Rod Laver Arena	Arlo Parks
August 3	Sydney	Australia	Afterpay Arena	Arlo Parks
August 4	Sydney	Australia	Afterpay Arena	Arlo Parks
August 6	Sydney	Australia	Afterpay Arena	Arlo Parks
