= Jensen McRae =

American singer-songwriter (born 1997)

- McRae in 2026

Background information
- Born: September 10, 1997 (age 29); Santa Monica, California, US
- Origin: Los Angeles, California
- Genres: Folk; alternative folk; folk-pop; indie rock
- Occupation: Singer-songwriter
- Instruments: Vocals, piano, guitar
- Years active: 2017–present
- Labels: Human Re Sources; The Orchard

Jensen Paige McRae (born September 10, 1997) is an American singer-songwriter. She gained prominence for her debut singles "White Boy" (2019) and "Wolves" (2020). Her music has been recommended by Rolling Stone, Vulture, Nylon, NPR, and The Fader. Her debut EP Who Hurt You? was released on June 25, 2021, followed by her debut studio album Are You Happy Now?, which was released on March 22, 2022.

== Early life and education ==
McRae was born in Santa Monica, California, and raised in the Woodland Hills neighborhood of Los Angeles. She is of Black and Jewish descent. She has been singing since childhood and began to study piano at age 7. Her early music influences were Carole King, James Taylor, Stevie Wonder, and Alicia Keys. She attended a summer program, Grammy Camp, during high school, which helped her decide to pursue music as a career path.

McRae received a bachelor’s degree in popular music performance from USC Thornton School of Music on a full-ride scholarship.

== Career ==
=== 2017–2018: Early EPs ===
McRae released her first two EPs online during college, Lighter (2017) and Milkshakes (2018).

=== 2019–2021: Debut Singles ===
Her debut single "White Boy" was released after her college graduation in 2019, followed by "Wolves" in 2020.

In March 2020 she released "The Plague" in reference to the United States government's failure to respond effectively to the COVID-19 pandemic.

In January 2021, McRae tweeted "in 2023 Phoebe Bridgers is gonna drop her third album & the opening track will be about hooking up in the car while waiting in line to get vaccinated at dodger stadium and it’s gonna make me cry." The Tweet went viral, and Bridgers also retweeted it. Soon after she released the parody vaccination theme song "Immune" in the style of Bridgers, produced by Rahki. That month she also collaborated with fellow Black folk artist Joy Oladokun on the track "Wish You the Best".

=== 2021–2022: Who Hurt You? and Are You Happy Now? ===
In March 2021 she released the track "Starting To Get To You," which was named one of NPR's 16 Songs Public Radio Can't Stop Playing.

Her debut extended play Who Hurt You? was released on June 22, 2021. On February 22, 2022 McRae announced her debut studio album Are You Happy Now?. It was released on March 22, 2022 and features all of the songs from Who Hurt You? except "Immune".

=== 2023–2024: It Wasn't Supposed To Be Like This... and "Massachusetts" ===
On September 20, 2023, McRae released the visual EP It Wasn't Supposed To Be Like This... on her Youtube channel. In November 2023, she uploaded the first verse and chorus of an unnamed song that garnered popularity on TikTok. She released the song under the name "Massachusetts" on June 11, 2024. This was her first release after signing with record label Dead Oceans.

=== 2025–present ===
McRae's second album, I Don't Know How but They Found Me! was released on 25 April 2025 with record label Dead Oceans, featuring the singles "Praying For Your Downfall," "Massachusetts," and "Savannah." The album features writing credits from Jake Wesley Rodgers, Joe London and Grant Averill.

On Saturday, May 17, 2025, Jensen was featured on a national broadcast of the CBS News Mornings show.

On 6 August 2025, Jensen announced on her Instagram that she will have a role in and song on the soundtrack of an upcoming Spike Lee film, this being her debut acting performance. She sang the song "King David" in Lee's 2025 film Highest 2 Lowest.

McRae will perform as an opening act for Gracie Abrams' The Look at My Life Tour for two nights in March 2027.

== Artistry ==
McRae has been compared to folk artists like Tracy Chapman and describes her music as "folk-alternative-pop". She is an alto. She has said that music industry professionals attempt to box her music into R&B and soul because she's a Black artist. Her music was described by WNUR: "Her rich, soothing voice complements the poised rebellion rooted in her socially and politically conscious lyrics." Her lyrics frequently reference personal experiences and larger social and political themes.

== Discography ==
Jensen McRae discography
- Studio albums: 2
- EPs: 1
- Singles: 13

=== Studio albums ===
Title	Details
Are You Happy Now?	Released: March 22, 2022; Label: Human Re Sources, The Orchard; Format: Digital download, streaming
I Don't Know How but They Found Me!	Released: April 25, 2025; Label: Dead Oceans

=== Extended plays ===
Title	Details
Who Hurt You?	Released: June 25, 2021; Label: Human Re Sources, The Orchard; Format: Digital download, streaming

=== Singles ===
==== As lead artist ====
Title	Year	Album
"White Boy"	2019	Who Hurt You? and Are You Happy Now?
"Wolves"	2020	Who Hurt You? and Are You Happy Now?
"The Plague"	2020	Non-album single
"Strange Fruit"	2020	I Can't Breathe / Music for the Movement
"Immune"	2021	Who Hurt You?
"skip.that.party" (with X Ambassadors)	2021	Non-album single
"Starting to Get You"	2021	Who Hurt You? and Are You Happy Now?
"Gone" (with Chiiild)	2021	Hope For Sale
"My Ego Dies at the End"	2021	Are You Happy Now?
"Happy Girl"	2022	Are You Happy Now?
"Massachusetts"	2024	I Don't Know How but They Found Me!
"Praying For Your Downfall"	2025	I Don't Know How but They Found Me!
"Savannah"	2025	I Don't Know How but They Found Me!
"Your Friend"	2026	I Don't Know How but They Found Me…Again!
"One More Cowboy"	2026	I Don't Know How but They Found Me…Again!
"Taboo"	2026	I Don't Know How but They Found Me…Again!
"Just Like You"	2026	I Don't Know How but They Found Me…Again!

=== As featured artist ===
Title	Year	Album
"Wish You the Best" (Joy Oladokun featuring Jensen McRae)	2021	In Defense of My Own Happiness

== Accolades ==
- 2020 - Complex, Best New Artists of the Month (March)
- 2020 - KCRW, 10 Best Songs of the Year (for "Wolves")
- 2021 - NPR, Slingshot's 2021 Artists To Watch
- 2021 - #YOUTUBEBLACK Voices Artist, Class of 2021

== Tours ==
=== Openers ===
- MUNA - North American Tour (2022)
- Maude Latour (2022)
- Noah Kahan - The Stick Season (We’ll All Be Here Forever) Tour (2024)
- Dermot Kennedy - Weight of the Woods tour (2026) opened in Birmingham and London on the UK leg of the tour.
- Gracie Abrams - The Look at My Life Tour (2027)
