= In Defense of My Own Happiness (The Beginnings) =

Studio album by Joy Oladokun
- Released: July 17, 2020
- Genres: Pop; folk; R&B; soul; hip-hop
- Length: 32:24
- Labels: White Boy; Amigo; Verve Forecast
- Producers: Jon Castelli; "Spider" Ron Entwistsle; Peter Groenwald; Jeremy Lutito; Joy Oladokun; Robopop

Joy Oladokun chronology
Carry (2016)	In Defense of My Own Happiness (The Beginnings) (2020)	In Defense of My Own Happiness (2021)

Singles from In Defense of My Own Happiness (The Beginnings)
- 1. "Sunday" Released: June 19, 2019; 2. "Too High" Released: April 14, 2020; 3. "Unwelcoming" Released: April 28, 2020; 4. "Bad Blood" Released: May 13, 2020; 5. "Breathe Again" Released: May 27, 2020; 6. "Who Do I Turn To?" Released: June 5, 2020; 7. "Mercy" Released: June 19, 2020

In Defense of My Own Happiness (The Beginnings) (stylized in all lowercase and originally titled In Defense of My Own Happiness (Vol. 1)) is the second studio album by American singer-songwriter Joy Oladokun. The ten-track album was released on July 17, 2020 through White Boy Records and re-released by Amigo Records and Verve Forecast Records under its current title on March 30, 2021. It was promoted by eight singles. A sequel to the album, titled simply In Defense of My Own Happiness was released on June 4, 2021 and included "Sunday" and "Breathe Again" from volume one. A "complete edition" was released on July 9, 2021 collecting both volumes.

== Critical reception ==
Susan Hansen, writing for The Line of Best Fit, gave the album a score of eight out of ten, saying "Showing the way into new genre-blending territory, Joy Oladokun’s fertile, present day mix of pop, R&B and folk constitutes irresistibility and pertinence." and compared her "guitar lines, vocals and contemplative lyrics" to Tracy Chapman.

== Track listing ==
In Defense of My Own Happiness (The Beginnings) track listing
No.	Title	Writer(s)	Producer(s)	Length
1.	"Smoke"	Olubukola Oladokun; Bre Kennedy; Jeremy Lutito; Matthew Koizol	Jeremy Lutito	2:51
2.	"Sunday"	Oladokun	Robopop	3:14
3.	"Bad Blood"	Oladokun	Oladokun	3:08
4.	"Unwelcoming"	Oladokun; Kevin Fisher	Oladokun	2:20
5.	"Lost"	Oladokun	Oladokun	3:25
6.	"Who Do I Turn To?"	Oladokun; Natalie Hemby	Oladokun	3:10
7.	"Mercy" (featuring Tim Gent)	Oladokun; Ben Didelot; Timothy Gentry	Oladokun	3:37
8.	"Breathe Again"	Oladokun; James Droll; Peter Groenwald	Peter Groenwald	3:49
9.	"Too High"	Oladokun	Oladokun	3:16
10.	"Younger Days"	Oladokun	"Spider" Ron Entwistsle; Jon Castelli	3:34
Total length:				32:24

In Defense of My Own Happiness (The Beginnings) (with commentary) track listing
No.	Title	Writer(s)	Producer(s)	Length
1.	"Smoke" (commentary)			1:38
2.	"Smoke"	Joy Oladokun; Kennedy; Lutito; Koizol	Lutito	2:51
3.	"Sunday" (commentary)			1:05
4.	"Sunday"	Oladokun	Robopop	3:14
5.	"Bad Blood" (commentary)			0:56
6.	"Bad Blood"	Oladokun	Oladokun	3:08
7.	"Unwelcoming" (commentary)			1:16
8.	"Unwelcoming"	Oladokun; Fisher	Oladokun	2:20
9.	"Lost" (commentary)			1:21
10.	"Lost"	Oladokun	Oladokun	3:25
11.	"Who Do I Turn To?" (commentary)			1:42
12.	"Who Do I Turn To?"	Oladokun; Hemby	Oladokun	3:10
13.	"Mercy" (commentary)			1:25
14.	"Mercy" (featuring Tim Gent)	Oladokun; Didelot; Gentry	Oladokun	3:37
15.	"Breathe Again" (commentary)			1:15
16.	"Breathe Again"	Oladokun; Droll; Groenwald	Peter Groenwald	3:49
17.	"Too High" (commentary)			1:25
18.	"Too High"	Oladokun	Oladokun	3:16
19.	"Younger Days" (commentary)			1:41
20.	"Younger Days"	Oladokun	Entwistsle; Castelli	3:34
Total length:				46:11

Notes

- All song titles stylized in all lowercase.

== Release history ==
Release dates and formats for In Defense of My Own Happiness (The Beginnings)
Region	Date	Format	Label
Various	July 17, 2020	Digital download; streaming	White Boy
Various	March 30, 2021	Digital download; streaming	Amigo; Verve Forecast
