= In Defense of My Own Happiness =

Studio album by Joy Oladokun
- Released: June 4, 2021
- Genre: Folk-pop; folk rock; indie rock; R&B
- Length: 46:00
- Label: Amigo; Verve Forecast; Republic
- Producer: Dave Bassett; Jon Castellini; Ian Fitchuk; Jeremy Lutito; Peter Groenwald; Joy Oladokun; David Pramik; Jimmy Robbins; Robopop

Joy Oladokun chronology
In Defense of My Own Happiness (The Beginnings) (2020)	In Defense of My Own Happiness (2021)	Proof of Life (2023)

Singles from In Defense of My Own Happiness
- 1. "If You Got a Problem" Released: September 18, 2020; 2. "I See America" Released: October 16, 2020; 3. "Look Up" Released: November 6, 2020; 4. "Mighty Die Young" Released: December 4, 2020; 5. "Wish You the Best" Released: January 15, 2021; 6. "Jordan" Released: February 26, 2021; 7. "Sorry Isn't Good Enough" Released: April 30, 2021; 8. "Bigger Man" Released: May 14, 2021

In Defense of My Own Happiness (stylized in all lowercase) is the third and major-label debut studio album by American singer-songwriter Joy Oladokun. It was released on June 4, 2021, by Amigo Records, Verve Forecast Records, and Republic Records, serveing as the sequel to her second studio album, In Defense of My Own Happiness (The Beginnings) (2020). It was promoted by eight singles released throughout 2020 and 2021, including two previous singles from The Beginnings, "Sunday" and "Breathe Again". The album features guest appearances from Jensen McRae, Maren Morris, and Penny & Sparrow. On July 30, 2021, a "complete edition" was released featuring all the songs from both albums, as well as two new songs.

In Defense of My Own Happiness was listed as one of the best albums of 2021 by American Songwriter and Billboard, the sixth best folk album of the year by PopMatters, and among the best albums of the first half of 2021 by Rolling Stone. The album was nominated for the GLAAD Media Award for Outstanding Breakthrough Music Artist.

== Background ==
After releasing two independent studio albums, Carry (2016) and In Defense of My Own Happiness (The Beginnings) (2020), Oladokun signed a record deal with Amigo Records and Verve Forecast Records under the Republic Records umbrella. Prior to this her music had been featured in various television shows like This Is Us, Grey's Anatomy, Catfish, The L Word: Generation Q, and Station 19 and named one of NPR's Artists to Watch.

In In Defense of My Own Happiness, Joy Oladokun sings about her experience as a queer Black woman born to Nigerian immigrants and raised in a small town in Arizona. It tackles issues like religious trauma, coming out, racial bias, and male privilege. Much of the album was recorded in Oladokun's East Nashville home studio. Oladokun attempts to lift up other Black and queer people with her music, saying in an interview with Nashville Scene, "I do feel like a sense of calling and camaraderie for people who have also been through similar things or had events that evoke similar emotions of loneliness and stress. I feel a responsibility to serve the global community in that way."

== Promotion ==
The album was promoted by eight singles, "If You Got a Problem", "I See America", "Look Up", "Mighty Die Young", "Wish You the Best", "Jordan", "Sorry Isn't Good Enough", and "Bigger Man". "If You Got a Problem, "Wish You the Best", and "Sorry Isn't Good Enough" all received official music videos. "Bigger Man" was sent to adult alternative radio on June 7, 2021.

Oladokun performed "Breathe Again" on The Tonight Show Starring Jimmy Fallon on February 9, 2021, and on Today on February 19, 2021. She performed "Look Up", "I See America", and "Sunday" on Hulu's Your Attention Please virtual Black History Month concert on February 18, 2021. She played "Sunday" on The Late Show with Stephen Colbert on June 24, 2021. She performed "If You Got a Problem", "Sunday", "I See America", and "Jordan" for Rolling Stone's "In My Room" at-home concert series on June 15, 2021. She performed "If You Got a Problem", "Taking the Heat", "I See America", and "Sunday" for NPR Tiny Desk Concert on August 20, 2021. On October 16, 2021, she performed "If You Got a Problem" on CBS Mornings. She played "Taking the Heat" on Austin City Limits on January 15, 2022. She performed "I See America" on Jimmy Kimmel Live! on January 19, 2022.

== Critical reception ==
Jake Uitti of American Songwriter called In Defense of My Own Happiness "a stunning first album–tender, personal, and pensive–and indicates there is more where this came from." Billboard writer Taylor Simz praised Oladokun's songwriting, saying "With each song, the album feels like stepping one foot deeper into a lake to be baptized through Oladokun’s gospel, as her soothing voice, piano and frequent claps wash over the listener. Her candor creates a sincere space for fans to take in the world from her perspective as she tackles racist biases on 'I See America' and double standards on the Maren Morris joint effort, 'Bigger Man.'" Rolling Stone's Jon Freeman said that "Oladokun never hides her past struggles or pain in her lyrics, but as with songs like 'If You Got a Problem' and 'Look Up,' she’s always seeking out the light to point the way, making for one of the year’s most uplifting listens." Jonathan Frahm of PopMatters said "Production is crisp, and arrangements are easily accessible yet meticulously crafted. It’s Oladokun’s magnificent heart that takes center stage, though, with her songs coming off as her meditations as a Black, LGBTQ+ woman."

== Track listing ==
In Defense of My Own Happiness track listing
No.	Title	Writer(s)	Producer(s)	Length
1.	"Someone That I Used To Be"	Olubukola Oladokun; Emily Habe; Jeremy Lutito	Oladokun	3:41
2.	"Sunday"	Oladokun	Robopop	3:13
3.	"Sorry Isn't Good Enough"	Oladokun; David Pramik	Oladokun; Pramik	3:07
4.	"I See America"	Oladokun	Oladokun	2:44
5.	"Wish You the Best" (featuring Jensen McRae)	Oladokun; Jensen McRae	Oladokun	3:12
6.	"Let It Be Me"	Oladokun; Henry Brill	Oladokun	3:50
7.	"Bigger Man" (with Maren Morris)	Oladokun; Jimmy Robbins; Laura Veltz; Maren Morris	Oladokun; Robbins	3:06
8.	"If You Got a Problem"	Oladokun; Ian Fitchuk; Peter Groenwald	Fitchuk; Groenwald	3:06
9.	"Mighty Die Young"	Oladokun	Oladokun	2:18
10.	"Breathe Again"	Oladokun; James Droll; Groenwald	Groenwald	3:49
11.	"Heaven From Here" (with Penny & Sparrow)	Oladokun; Jake Ohlbaum; Sean Trainor	Oladokun	3:03
12.	"Look Up"	Oladokun; Dave Bassett	Bassett	3:33
13.	"Taking the Heat"	Oladokun	Oladokun	3:17
14.	"Jordan"	Oladokun	Oladokun	4:01
Total length:				46:00

In Defense of My Own Happiness (complete) track listing
No.	Title	Writer(s)	Producer(s)	Length
1.	"Jordan"	Oladokun	Oladokun	4:01
2.	"Smoke"	Oladokun; Matthew Koziol; Bre Kennedy; Lutito	Lutito	2:50
3.	"If You Got a Problem"	Oladokun; Fitchuk; Groenwald	Fitchuk; Groenwald	3:06
4.	"I See America"	Oladokun	Oladokun	2:44
5.	"Heaven From Here" (with Penny & Sparrow)	Oladokun; Ohlbaum; Trainor	Oladokun	3:03
6.	"Younger Days"	Oladokun	Jon Castellini	3:34
7.	"Sunday"	Oladokun	Robopop	3:13
8.	"Bad Blood"	Oladokun	Oladokun	3:08
9.	"Lost"	Oladokun	Oladokun	3:24
10.	"Who Do I Turn To?"	Oladokun; Natalie Hemby	Oladokun	3:09
11.	"Sorry Isn't Good Enough"	Oladokun; Pramik	Oladokun; Pramik	3:07
12.	"Taking the Heat"	Oladokun	Oladokun	3:17
13.	"Brick by Brick"	Oladokun	Oladokun	3:33
14.	"Someone That I Used To Be"	Oladokun; Habe; Lutito	Oladokun	3:41
15.	"Unwelcoming"	Oladokun; Sweet Talker	Oladokun	2:19
16.	"Bigger Man" (with Maren Morris)	Oladokun; Robbins; Veltz; Morris	Oladokun; Robbins	3:06
17.	"Mercy" (featuring Tim Gent)	Oladokun; Gent; Ben Didelot	Oladokun	3:36
18.	"Let It Be Me"	Oladokun; Brill	Oladokun	3:49
19.	"Mighty Die Young"	Oladokun	Oladokun	2:18
20.	"Judas"	Oladokun; Droll; Steven Colyer	Groenwald	2:41
21.	"Breathe Again"	Oladokun; Droll; Groenwald	Groenwald	3:49
22.	"Too High"	Oladokun	Bassett	3:16
23.	"Look Up"	Oladokun; Bassett	Bassett	3:33
24.	"Wish You the Best" (featuring Jensen McRae)	Oladokun; McRae	Oladokun	3:12
Total length:				78:29

=== Notes ===
- All song titles stylized in all lowercase, except "Bigger Man" and "Who Do I Turn To?"

== Personnel ==
=== Musicians ===
- Joy Oladokun – vocals (all tracks), bass, drums, guitar, keyboards, percussion, programming
- Dave Bassett – programming
- Bobby Chase – violin
- Ian Fitchuk – programming
- Peter Groenwald – programming
- Austin Hoke – cello
- Betsy Lamb – viola
- Jensen McRae – vocals
- Maren Morris – vocals
- Penny and Sparrow – vocals
- David Pramik – drums, guitar
- Jimmy Robbins – banjo, keyboards, percussion, piano, programming
- Robopop – programming
- Kristin Weber – violin

=== Technical ===
- Dale Becker – mastering
- Joshua Berkman – A&R
- Pedro Calloni – mixing
- Dahlia Ambach Caplin – A&R
- Chloe Clements – A&R
- Fili Fizziola – assistant mastering engineer, mastering
- Clint Gibbs – mixing
- Mike "Frog" Griffith – production coordinator
- Conor Hedge – assistant mastering engineer
- Jordan Lehning – string arranger, recording engineer
- Sean Moffit – mixing
- David Pramik – recording engineer
- Jimmy Robbins – recording engineer
- Konrad Snyder – mixing
- Hector Vega – assistant mastering engineer

=== Complete edition only ===
- Jon Castellini – mixing
- Ben Didelot – mastering engineer, mixing
- "Spider" Ron Entwistle – guitar
- Tim Gent – vocals
- George Hazelrigg – Hammond B3, piano
- Nate Lotz – drums
- Jeremy Lutito – programming
- Logan Matheny – mixing
- Rob Moose – strings
- Jon Ossman – bass
- Todd Simon – horn

== Release history ==
Release dates and formats
Region	Date	Format	Version	Label	Ref.
Various	June 4, 2021	Digital download; streaming	Standard	Amigo; Verve Forecast; Republic	
Various	July 9, 2021	CD; digital download; streaming	Complete	Amigo; Verve Forecast; Republic	
