= My Truck =

2019 debut single by Breland

Single by Breland

from the EP Breland
- Released: September 28, 2019
- Recorded: 2019
- Genre: Country rap; hip-hop
- Length: 2:39
- Label: Bad Realm; Atlantic
- Songwriters: Daniel Breland; Troy Taylor; Kalvin Austin; Devon Barton; Edrick Miles; Tatiana Zeigler
- Producers: Troy Taylor; Kal V

Breland singles chronology
"My Truck" (2019)	"Horseride" (2020)

Music video
- "My Truck" on YouTube

"My Truck" is the debut single by American musician Breland from his self-titled debut EP Breland (2020). It was first released independently in September 2019, and released by Bad Realm and Atlantic Records in January 2020 serving as the EP's lead single. The song entered the Hot Country Songs chart at number 46 in February 2020, and later peaked at number 26 in April 2020.

"My Truck" has been certified platinum by the Recording Industry Association of America (RIAA).

== Reception ==
Jon Caramanica of The New York Times found the record to be "one of the year’s most beguiling singles, is a fluent amalgam of country verbiage and vocal texture with hip-hop bluster and cadence".

== Remix ==
A remix, featuring country music singer Sam Hunt, was released on April 25, 2020.

== Chart performance ==
=== Weekly charts ===
Weekly chart performance for "My Truck"
Chart (2020–21)	Peak position
Canada (Canadian Hot 100)	95
US Billboard Hot 100	92
US Hot Country Songs (Billboard)	24
US Hot R&B/Hip-Hop Songs (Billboard)	46
US Rhythmic (Billboard)	35

=== Year-end charts ===
Year-end chart performance for "My Truck"
Chart (2020)	Position
US Hot Country Songs (Billboard)	72

== Certifications ==
Certifications for "My Truck"
Region	Certification	Certified units/sales
Canada (Music Canada)	2× Platinum	160,000^{‡}
United States (RIAA)	2× Platinum	2,000,000^{‡}
^{‡} Sales+streaming figures based on certification alone.
