= Daughter from Hell =

- Standard edition cover

Studio album by Gracie Abrams
- Released: July 17, 2026
- Recorded: 2024–2026
- Studios: Electric Lady (New York); Long Pond (Hudson Valley); Unknown studio (London)
- Length: 56:08
- Label: Interscope
- Producers: Gracie Abrams; Aaron Dessner; Dan Nigro

Gracie Abrams chronology
The Secret of Us (2024)	Daughter from Hell (2026)

Singles from Daughter from Hell
- 1. "Hit the Wall" Released: May 14, 2026; 2. "Look at My Life" Released: June 25, 2026; 3. "Good Reason" Released: July 24, 2026

Singles from Daughter from Hell (Deluxe)
- 1. "Here You Come, There You Go" Released: October 29, 2026

Daughter from Hell is the third studio album by the American singer-songwriter Gracie Abrams, released on July 17, 2026 by Interscope Records. It serves as the follow-up to her second studio album, The Secret of Us (2024). The album's lead single, "Hit the Wall", was released on May 14, 2026, followed by the second and third singles, "Look at My Life" and "Good Reason", on June 25 and July 24 respectively. To support the album, Abrams is embarking on the Look at My Life Tour, beginning in December 2026 and is set to conclude in May 2027. A deluxe edition was released on November 20, 2026, with the single "Here You Come, There You Go" released on October 29.

== Background ==
Following the release of her 2024 album The Secret of Us, Abrams debuted new material during the Secret of Us Tour in early 2025, performing unreleased songs including "Death Wish", "Cold Goodbyes", "Crazy Girl", and "In Between". She also premiered the song "Out of Nowhere" live during her set at the Glastonbury Festival 2025.

In an interview with People on January 7, 2026, she first spoke about her upcoming third studio album, saying that she was "beyond ready for [the album] to belong to everyone else". She said she had "never felt this way about anything" she had made before, which was "driving [her] crazy". Regarding the anticipation surrounding the album, she said she "loved the feeling" but also felt "kind of calm" about it, instead appreciating the time she had spent with the record and the people she worked with.

Starting in March 2026, Abrams regularly shared glimpses on her Instagram, including photos of herself, moments with collaborators like Aaron Dessner and Bella Blasko, and a leather-bound journal marked with the number "3" and a sticker reading "witch". Additionally, some of the stickers in her gallery featured the abbreviation "DFH". On April 20, she posted a snippet of a song playing on her phone to her Instagram. On May 1, 2026, she revealed that the lead single, "Hit the Wall", would be released on May 14 at 9 p.m. PST, sharing its accompanying artwork as well. On May 11, she revealed the album title, artwork, and release date on Instagram, announcing that it will feature 16 songs. On June 17, 2026, she revealed the album tracklist on Instagram, with art that features a black-and-white image of Abrams. The next day, "Crazy Girl" was announced as the bonus track for the Target special edition vinyl via Gracie Abrams HQ on Instagram. She previously premiered the song live during her set at BST Hyde Park 2025.

== Critical reception ==
Professional ratings
Aggregate scores
Source	Rating
AnyDecentMusic?	5.7/10
Metacritic	63/100
Review scores
Source	Rating
AllMusic	3/5 stars
Associated Press	4/5 stars
Consequence	B−
Financial Times	2/5 stars
The Guardian	2/5 stars
NME	3/5 stars
Pitchfork	6.2/10
Rolling Stone	4.5/5 stars
The Sydney Morning Herald	2/5 stars

According to the review aggregator Metacritic, Daughter from Hell received "generally favorable reviews" based on a weighted average score of 63 out of 100 from 10 critic scores. The review aggregator AnyDecentMusic? gave the album a weighted average score of 5.7 out of 10 from thirteen critic scores.

Elise Ryan in the Associated Press wrote that Daughter from Hell "finds Abrams in a darker place than her previous two records" but the album's tracks are able to "live up to the bigger arenas she now fills" through a broader array of instrumentation and production. Ryan pointed to "Humming" as "beautiful" and the "most ambitious" track lyrically on the album.

In a negative review for The Guardian, Laura Snapes characterized Daughter from Hell as melodramatic and unable to live up to its title, with the "grandeur" of the title track's instrumentation "starkly highlight[ing] the genericness of the record’s centrepiece". Snapes wrote that while "there's a lot of poetic licence involved in dramatising these mature revelations," "the dissonance between Abrams' goth-coded emotional turbulence and the music's insistent, quivering prettiness is the real uncrackable case," which makes the album "bloodless" for Snapes.

== Commercial performance ==
In the United States, Daughter from Hell debuted at number one on the Billboard 200 with first-week sales of 124,000 album-equivalent units. It sales figure consisted of 77,000 pure sales, 46,500 streaming-equivalent units (translated from 47.27 million streams), and 500 track-equivalent units. The album also placed at number one on Top Album Sales, and number six on Top Streaming Albums.

In the United Kingdom, the album debuted at number one on the UK Albums Chart. According to Music Week, the album earned 30,897 album-equivalent units in its first week in the country: 10,920 CD sales, 6,012 vinyl sales, 4,819 cassette sales, 1,114 digital sales, and 8,032 streaming-equivalent albums.

== Track listing ==
All tracks are produced by Gracie Abrams and Aaron Dessner, except where noted.

Standard edition
No.	Title	Writer(s)	Producer(s)	Length
1.	"Hit the Wall"	Gracie Abrams; Aaron Dessner; Bryce Dessner^{[a]}; Michael Blasky^{[a]}	Abrams; A. Dessner; Justin Vernon^{[b]}	3:14
2.	"Death Wish"	Abrams; A. Dessner		3:35
3.	"The Knife"	Abrams; A. Dessner; B. Dessner^{[a]}; Blasky^{[a]}		3:36
4.	"Daughter from Hell"	Abrams; A. Dessner		4:04
5.	"Look at My Life"	Abrams; A. Dessner	Abrams; A. Dessner; Dan Nigro	3:10
6.	"Good Reason"	Abrams; A. Dessner		4:08
7.	"Men Like You"	Abrams; A. Dessner; B. Dessner^{[a]}; Blasky^{[a]}		4:03
8.	"Sober"	Abrams; A. Dessner		2:51
9.	"Broke My Heart"	Abrams; A. Dessner; Edgar Barrera; Vernon; B. Dessner^{[a]}; Blasky^{[a]}	Abrams; A. Dessner; Vernon^{[b]}	3:39
10.	"Mews"	Abrams; A. Dessner; B. Dessner^{[a]}; Blasky^{[a]}		4:11
11.	"Minibar"	Abrams; Audrey Hobert		2:00
12.	"Imaginary Friend"	Abrams; Paul Mescal		2:29
13.	"Afflictions"	Abrams; A. Dessner; B. Dessner^{[a]}; Blasky^{[a]}		3:27
14.	"Humming"	Abrams; A. Dessner	Abrams; A. Dessner; Vernon^{[b]}	4:11
15.	"What If It's Right?" (with Marcus Mumford)	Abrams; A. Dessner		4:34
16.	"Cold Goodbyes"	Abrams; A. Dessner		2:56
Total length:				56:08

Deluxe edition
No.	Title	Writer(s)	Producer(s)	Length
17.	"Here You Come, There You Go"	Abrams; Amy Allen; James Stack	Jim-E Stack	2:50
18.	"Lost in It"	Abrams; Allen; Stack	Jim-E Stack	2:55
19.	"Crazy Girl"	Abrams; A. Dessner		2:54
20.	"Love Letter"	Abrams; A. Dessner; B. Dessner^{[a]}; Blasky^{[a]}		3:05
21.	"Out of Nowhere"	Abrams; Casey Kalmenson	Kalmenson; Jim-E Stack	2:52
Total length:				70:45

- ^{^[a]} Co-arranger
- ^{^[b]} Additional producer
- Target edition features "Crazy Girl" as the bonus track.
- "Love Letter" and "Out of Nowhere" were originally released as the bonus tracks on limited iTunes Store edition.

== Personnel ==
These credits have been adapted from Tidal.

=== Performers ===
- Gracie Abrams – vocals (all tracks), piano (tracks 1, 5, 8, 10, 14), background vocals (2–4, 7, 8, 10, 14, 16), synthesizer (11–13), acoustic guitar (12)
- Aaron Dessner – acoustic guitar (1–15), synthesizer (1–14), drums (1–6, 8–12), drum programming (1–3, 5, 7, 9, 11, 13–15), piano (1, 2, 4, 5, 7, 8, 10–15), bass (1, 3, 5–10, 12–15), electric guitar (2–4, 6, 7, 9, 13–15), grand piano (2, 3, 9), keyboards (2, 4, 10, 16), bass synthesizer (2, 5, 7–9, 11), guitar (2, 14), upright piano (2), tambourine (3, 4, 6, 8), shaker (3, 4, 11–13, 15); organ, slide guitar (4); nylon-string guitar (8, 15), Mellotron (9)
- James McAlister – synthesizer (1, 5–8, 11–14), electric guitar (1, 5–7, 14), drum programming (1, 5, 7–9, 11–14), Rhodes (1), drums (2, 6, 11, 13), tambourine (6), bass synthesizer (7, 11, 14); acoustic guitar, percussion (7); shaker (8), bass (11), keyboards (12)
- Benjamin Lanz – synthesizer (1, 5, 7, 8, 13), trombone (1, 5), bass synthesizer (1, 7, 11)
- Kristiyan Evgeniev Chernev – cello (1, 3, 7, 9, 10, 13)
- Metodija Gjorgjiev – cello (1, 3, 7, 9, 10, 13)
- Oleg Kondratenko – conducting (1, 3, 7, 9, 10, 13)
- Margarita Kalcheva – double bass (1, 3, 7, 9, 10, 13)
- Aleksandar Stojcheski – viola (1, 3, 7, 9, 10, 13)
- Dubravka Zajkova – viola (1, 3, 7, 9, 10, 13)
- Anna Kondratenk – violin (1, 3, 7, 9, 10, 13)
- Bojan Ilkosk – violin (1, 3, 7, 9, 10, 13)
- Hana Paljoshi – violin (1, 3, 7, 9, 10, 13)
- Ivana Zdravkova – violin (1, 3, 9, 10), viola (7, 13)
- Jane Bakevski – violin (1, 3, 7, 9, 10, 13)
- Jasmina Dragomanska – violin (1, 3, 7, 9, 10, 13)
- Martin Dimitrov – violin (1, 3, 7, 9, 10, 13)
- Tamara Ohomush – violin (1, 3, 7, 9, 10, 13)
- Tatjana Kocharova – violin (1, 3, 7, 9, 10, 13)
- Eva Bogoevska – violin (1, 3, 9, 10)
- Bozidar Pejic – cello (1, 9, 10)
- Pavle Savic – cello (1, 9, 10)
- Aleksandar Laovski – viola (1, 9, 10)
- Fana Spirkoska – viola (1, 9, 10)
- Emil Chichonovski – violin (1, 9, 10)
- Maja Efremova Shekerova – violin (1, 9, 10)
- Justin Vernon – synthesizer (1, 11), background vocals (1), vocals (9, 14), drums (9), electric guitar (14)
- Aleksandar Tasevski – bassoon (1, 10)
- Tadija Mincic – bassoon (1, 10)
- Milan Roksandić – French horn (1, 10)
- Thomas Bartlett – keyboards (3, 4, 7)
- Andrew Barr – drums (3, 4, 11), shaker (13)
- Marija Mihajlovska – cello (3, 7, 13)
- Srdjan Sretenovic – cello (3, 7, 13)
- Andrea Spirova – viola (3, 7, 13)
- Katarina Pavlovic – violin (3, 7, 13)
- Marko Pop Ristov – violin (3, 7, 13)
- Marko Videnovikj – violin (3, 7, 13)
- Pamela Velkova – violin (3, 7, 13)
- Daniel Nigro – acoustic bass guitar, drum programming, synthesizer (5)
- Sterling Laws – drums (5)
- Paul Cartwright – fiddle, strings (5)
- Eddy Dunlap – pedal steel guitar (6, 8, 9), Pedabro (8)
- Marcus Mumford – vocals (15)

=== Technical ===
- Bella Blasko – engineering (all tracks), mixing (1–3, 6, 8, 10, 13, 15, 16)
- Bryce Bordone – engineering (4, 5, 7, 9, 11, 12, 14)
- Gillian Pelkonen – additional engineering (1, 3, 4), engineering assistance (2, 6–12, 14, 15)
- James McAlister – additional engineering (1, 5–8, 11, 13, 14)
- Benjamin Lanz – additional engineering (1, 5, 7, 8, 13)
- Dragisa Stojanov – additional engineering (1, 9, 10)
- Thomas Bartlett – additional engineering (3, 4, 7)
- Pete Min – additional engineering (3, 4, 13)
- Arber Curri – additional engineering (3, 7, 13)
- Daniel Nigro – additional engineering (5)
- Eddy Dunlap – additional engineering (6, 8, 9)
- Dani Perez – engineering assistance (1, 2, 6, 9, 11, 15, 16)
- Marina Lefkova – engineering assistance (1, 3, 7, 9, 10, 13)
- Liam Hebb – engineering assistance (1, 8, 10, 13)
- Teo Dench Garcia – engineering assistance (1, 8, 10, 12, 13)
- Lauren Marquez – engineering assistance (2, 4, 7, 10, 11, 13)
- Chiara Ferracuti – engineering assistance (3, 4, 7, 9, 13)
- Andrew Bouillianne – engineering assistance (4)
- Randy Merrill – mastering
- Serban Ghenea – mixing (4, 5, 7, 9, 11, 12, 14)

== Charts ==
Chart performance for Daughter from Hell
Chart (2026)	Peak position
Australian Albums (ARIA)	1
Austrian Albums (Ö3 Austria)	1
Belgian Albums (Ultratop Flanders)	1
Belgian Albums (Ultratop Wallonia)	1
Canadian Albums (Billboard)	1
Czech Albums (ČNS IFPI)	25
Danish Albums (Hitlisten)	15
Dutch Albums (Album Top 100)	1
Finnish Albums (Suomen virallinen lista)	6
French Albums (SNEP)	1
German Albums (Offizielle Top 100)	1
German Pop Albums (Offizielle Top 100)	1
Greek Albums (IFPI)	39
Hungarian Albums (MAHASZ)	6
Irish Albums (Official Charts)	1
Italian Albums (FIMI)	5
Japanese Digital Albums (Oricon)	39
Japanese Hot Albums (Billboard Japan)	74
Japanese Western Albums (Oricon)	13
Lithuanian Albums (AGATA)	42
New Zealand Albums (RMNZ)	1
Norwegian Albums (IFPI Norge)	9
Polish Albums (ZPAV)	2
Portuguese Albums (AFP)	1
Scottish Albums (Official Charts)	1
Slovak Albums (ČNS IFPI)	18
Spanish Albums (Promusicae)	2
Swedish Albums (Sverigetopplistan)	7
Swiss Albums (Schweizer Hitparade)	2
UK Albums (Official Charts)	1
US Billboard 200	1
US Americana/Folk Albums (Billboard)	1

== Certifications ==
Certifications for Daughter from Hell
Region	Certification	Certified units/sales
United Kingdom (BPI)	Silver	60,000^{‡}
^{‡} Sales+streaming figures based on certification alone.
