= Death Wish (song) =

2025 promotional single by Gracie Abrams

- Live from the O2 Arena version cover

Promotional single by Gracie Abrams

from the album Daughter from Hell
- Released: March 31, 2025
- Venue: O2 Arena
- Length: 3:36; 3:48 (Live from the O2 Arena)
- Label: Interscope
- Songwriters: Gracie Abrams; Aaron Dessner
- Producers: Gracie Abrams; Aaron Dessner

Lyric video
- "Death Wish" on YouTube

"Death Wish" is a song by American singer-songwriter Gracie Abrams, written by her and Aaron Dessner. Abrams debuted the song live at the O2 Arena on March 6, 2025, at the London stop of her The Secret of Us Tour. On July 17, 2026, the song was released as a part of Abrams's third studio album, Daughter from Hell.

== Background and composition ==
"Death Wish" is written and produced by Abrams and Aaron Dessner. While debuting the song, Abrams stated: "This song is about a friend of mine who recently was dating, like, a mega narcissist. [...] A sincere friend of mine was recently dating someone who kind of sucked. And I was listening to them talk about it a lot, and so this song is about that." The song is a stripped back piano ballad, and has been described by Rolling Stone's Briah Hiatt as a fan favorite as well as "gorgeous, [and] wistful".

== Promotion ==
Abrams debuted "Death Wish" at the O2 Arena on March 6, 2025, at the London stop of her The Secret of Us Tour. On March 31, Abrams posted a clip of her performance onto Instagram, announcing that the live recording would be released as a promotional single to streaming platforms later that evening, stating "This is the first and only time I've played this song, but I wanted you to have this version before anything else".

== Charts ==
Chart performance
Chart (2025—2026)	Peak position
Australia (ARIA)	78
Canada Hot 100 (Billboard)	61
New Zealand Hot Singles (RMNZ)	33
US Bubbling Under Hot 100 (Billboard)	10
