= Shadow Boxers =

- Directed by: Katya Bankowsky
- Produced by: Katya Bankowsky
- Cinematography: Anthony Hardwick; Tony Wolberg
- Edited by: Katya Bankowsky
- Music by: Zoel
- Distributed by: Original release Image Entertainment Rights available
- Release date: 1999
- Running time: 72 minutes
- Country: United States
- Language: English

Shadow Boxers is a 1999 American documentary film about women's boxing, by director Katya Bankowsky, that focuses on the pioneering fighter Lucia Rijker. It also features an original soundtrack by Argentine singer and songwriter Zoel. Shadow Boxers had its international premiere at the Toronto International Film Festival in 1999.

== Synopsis ==
Bankowsky began working on a film about women's boxing in the early 1990s, when she was training to fight at Gleason's Gym in Brooklyn. Filming commenced at the 1995 Golden Gloves competition, the first year the tournament was open to female participants, a group which included Bankowsky herself. After filming the Golden Gloves, Bankowsky began searching for the woman she thought would be the first truly great female champion. After meeting with Barbara Buttrick, founder of the WIBF, who was in the process of starting a global database of women interested in the sport, Bankowsky came across footage of Rijker and decided she would be the perfect subject for her film.

At the time, Rijker had left her native the Netherlands to pursue an acting career in Los Angeles. She had been the kickboxing champion of Europe for 14 years and had wanted to retire from fighting, but Bankowsky telephoned her and convinced her that she would be the first world champion of women's boxing if she chose to pursue it. Rijker agreed to let Bankowsky film her as she took on this challenge, and the director followed her for the next three years while she worked toward winning the world title.

== Response ==
Shadow Boxers played at the Toronto and Berlin International Film Festivals and premiered domestically at the Seattle Film Festival, where it was runner-up to Wim Wenders' Buena Vista Social Club for the festival's Audience Award. Shadow Boxers went on to play in 30 other film festivals worldwide, including the Crétiel International Festival de Films de Femmes, where it picked up the award for Best Feature Film; the CMJ Film and Music Festival in New York, where it won the award for best editing and usage of music ( by Zoel ); the Florida Film Festival, where it won best first feature; the Santa Monica International Doc Festival, where it was honored as the best film of the festival; and the New Haven Film Festival, where it was awarded the Kodak Cinematography Award as well as the audience award. "Shadow Boxers" was given honorary screenings at Lincoln Center in New York and The American Cinematheque in Los Angeles.

In addition to its success on the festival circuit, Shadow Boxers was released in theaters in the United States and around the world before making its television premiere on the Sundance Channel and being released on DVD by Image Entertainment. The film's theatrical release received acclaim from many writers. The New York Post wrote "boxing hasn't been shown this creatively on screen since Raging Bull," and B. Ruby Rich, noted that the film "propels the viewer smack into the adrenaline-drenched, rugged, euphoric scene of women's boxing." Critics for The Village Voice and The New York Times praised the film, and The Vancouver Sun called it "a perfect film about women's boxing." For press summary, please see link to press clips below.

== Influence ==
While in Toronto to show their film at the Film Festival, Bankowsky and Rijker met actress Hilary Swank, who Rijker later trained for her role in Clint Eastwood's Million Dollar Baby at the invitation of the film's production team. Working with Swank introduced Rijker to the film's writer, Paul Haggis, who told her that he and Eastwood had watched Shadow Boxers multiple times. Rijker eventually took a role in the movie as one of Swank's opponents.
