= Good Reason =

Single by Gracie Abrams

from the album Daughter from Hell
- Released: July 24, 2026
- Length: 4:08
- Label: Interscope
- Songwriters: Gracie Abrams; Sarah Aarons
- Producers: Gracie Abrams; Aaron Dessner

Gracie Abrams singles chronology
"Look at My Life" (2026)	"Good Reason" (2026)	"Here You Come, There You Go" (2026)

Lyric video
- "Good Reason" on YouTube

"Good Reason" is a song by American singer-songwriter Gracie Abrams. Abrams written the song with Sarah Aarons and produced the song with Aaron Dessner. It was sent to radio on July 24, 2026, as the third single from her third studio album, Daughter from Hell (2026).

== Composition ==
"Good Reason" is written in 3/4 time. Lyrically, Gracie Abrams explores leaving an otherwise healthy relationship based on a gut feeling that it is not right for her, while being uncertain about whether doing so will benefit her.

== Critical reception ==
Comparing "Good Reason" to Abrams' song "I Love You, I'm Sorry", Molly Mary O'Brien of Pitchfork considered it "softer and warmer, hazy but still distinct", and wrote "most importantly, it ditches the verbose bridge in favor of a pared down post-chorus, giving her emotions some much-needed breathing room". BBC's Mark Savage described the song as a "stunning ballad". Michael Savio of Slant Magazine praised Abrams' vocal performance, highlighting the balance between the richness of her lower register and the breathy, tender quality of her upper register, and called the song "charmingly waltzy".

== Charts ==
Chart performance for "Good Reason"
Chart (2026)	Peak position
Australia (ARIA)	46
Canada Hot 100 (Billboard)	36
Global 200 (Billboard)	99
Ireland (IRMA)	56
New Zealand Hot Singles (RMNZ)	1
UK Singles (Official Charts)	55
US Billboard Hot 100	51
