= Joy Oladokun =

American singer-songwriter (born 1992)

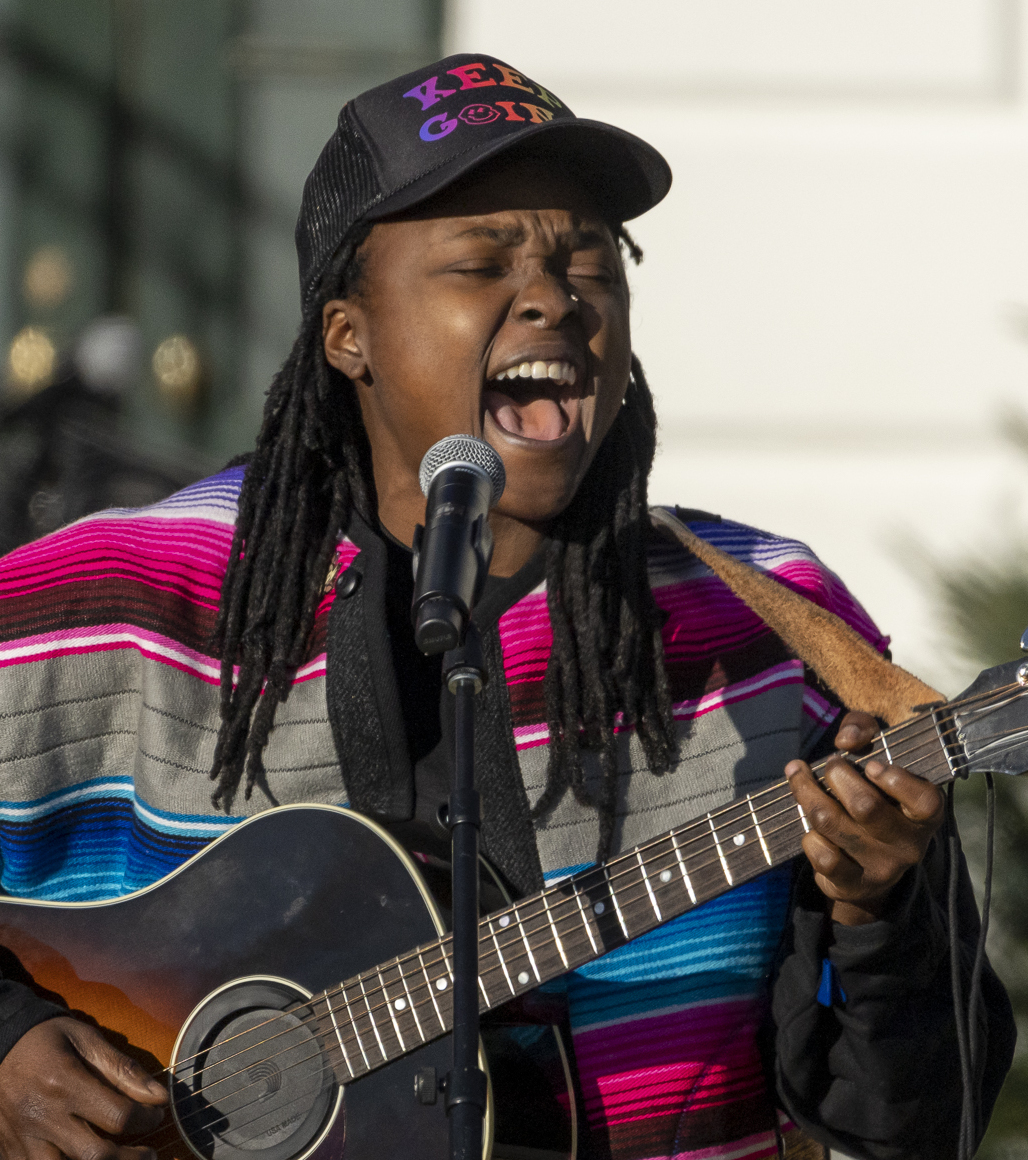
- Oladokun performing at the White House, 2022

Background information
- Born: Olubukola Joy Oladokun; April 6, 1992 (age 34); Casa Grande, Arizona, US
- Genres: Folk; alternative country; R&B; pop; roots rock; folk-pop
- Years active: 2016–present
- Labels: Well; White Boy; Amigo; Verve Forecast; Republic
- Website: joyoladokun.com

Olubukola Joy Oladokun (born April 6, 1992) is an American singer-songwriter. Oladokun's music spans the genres of folk, R&B, rock, and pop and is influenced by her identity as a queer person of color. She (Note: Oladokun uses both she/her and they/them pronouns. This article uses she/her for consistency.) has released six studio albums: Carry (2016), In Defense of My Own Happiness (The Beginnings) (2020), In Defense of My Own Happiness (2021), Proof of Life (2023), Observations from a Crowded Room (2024), and Hope is a Heavy Thing (2026).

== Early life ==
Oladokun grew up in Casa Grande, Arizona, listening to country and folk music, as well as Bob Marley and Lauryn Hill. Both of her parents are Nigerian immigrants to the United States. Her family regularly attended a Christian church, where Oladokun was chosen to lead worship. Later, Oladokun left the church because it limited her creativity.

When Oladokun was 10, a video of Tracy Chapman inspired her to learn guitar.

After college, at a friend's suggestion, Oladokun moved to Los Angeles to pursue her music career. She later moved to East Nashville, where she signed with Prescription Songs.

== Career ==
In 2015, Joy Oladokun self-released her debut EP, Cathedrals. Her debut studio album, Carry, was funded by Kickstarter and released on April 29, 2016, through Well Records.

Oladokun released the single "Sunday" in 2019, saying "'Sunday' is the song that 12-year-old Joy, seated in the back of church youth group, needed to hear. She needed to hear that you can be queer and happy. Queer and healthy. Queer and holy. She needed to see married women kissing and playing with their kids." The music video highlights people in LGBTQ relationships and has a predominantly queer cast.

In 2020, during the Black Lives Matter movement Oladokun released "Who Do I Turn To?", a ballad co-written with Natalie Hemby. Oladokun’s song "Mercy" follows in the same theme, describing her experience as a black person in the United States, while the single "I See America" criticizes systemic racism. NPR listed "I See America" on its 100 Best Songs of 2020.

On July 17, 2020, Oladokun released her second studio album, In Defense of My Own Happiness (The Beginnings), with White Boy Records. Billboard described the album as a "stunningly emotional collection". Mitch Mosk, editor-in-chief of Atwood Magazine, called it a "a sweeping, soaring, and stunning sophomore record oozing heart and soul."

In 2021, Oladokun received a grant from YouTube's "#YouTubeBlack Voices Fund". The same year she signed with Amigo Records, Verve Forecast Records, and Republic Records. On June 4, 2021, she released her third studio album, In Defense of My Own Happiness.

On February 17, 2023, Oladokun announced her fourth studio album, Proof of Life, along with the release of the first song off the album entitled "Changes". On March 16, 2023, Oladokun announced the next single off the album entitled "We're All Gonna Die", featuring Noah Kahan, and the lyric video of the song appeared on April 4. On April 20, Oladokun announced her tour for the album which she called "The Living Proof Tour", the tickets for which went on sale on April 25. The tour started on September 10, and ended on October 5, 2023. On April 28, Oladokun released Proof of Life. The album features Mt. Joy (on the track "Friends"), Manchester Orchestra ("You At The Table"), Maxo Kream ("Revolution"), Chris Stapleton ("Sweet Symphony") and Noah Kahan ("We're All Gonna Die").

In August 2024, Oladokun was the opening act for four North American shows on Hozier’s Unreal Unearth Tour. She also opened for the tour’s shows in Australia and New Zealand in November 2024.

On September 25, 2026, Oladokun released her sixth studio album, Hope is a Heavy Thing.

== Personal life ==
Oladokun is gender-nonconforming, and "not totally in the binary." Oladokun uses she/they pronouns.

== Discography ==
Joy Oladokun discography
- Studio albums: 5
- EPs: 2
- Singles: 33
- Music videos: 9

=== Studio albums ===
Title	Album details	Peak chart positions		
Title	Album details	US Sales	US Heat	UK Amer.
Carry	Released: April 29, 2016; Label: Well; Format: Digital download, streaming	―	―	―
In Defense of My Own Happiness (The Beginnings) (Note: Originally released as In Defense of My Own Happiness (Vol. 1))	Released: July 17, 2020; Label: White Boy, Amigo; Format: Digital download, streaming	―	―	―
In Defense of My Own Happiness	Released: June 4, 2021; Label: Amigo, Verve Forecast, Republic; Format: CD, digital download, streaming	―	―	―
Proof of Life	Released: April 28, 2023; Label: Amigo, Verve Forecast, Republic; Format: LP, CD, digital download, streaming	96	19	25
Observations from a Crowded Room	Released: October 18, 2024; Label: Amigo, Verve Forecast, Republic; Format: CD, digital download, streaming	―	―	―
Hope Is a Heavy Thing	Released: September 25, 2026; Label: Feed the Family, Concord	–	–	–

=== Reissued albums ===
Title	Details
In Defense of My Own Happiness (Complete)	Released: July 9, 2021; Label: Amigo, Verve Forecast, Republic; Format: CD, digital download, streaming
Proof of Life (Deluxe)	Released: October 13, 2023; Label: Amigo, Verve Forecast, Republic; Format: digital download, streaming

=== Extended plays ===
Title	Details
Cathedrals	Released: April 25, 2015; Label: Self-released; Format: CD, digital download
Spotify Singles	Released: October 20, 2021; Label: Amigo, Verve Forecast, Republic; Format: Streaming

=== Singles ===
==== As lead artist ====
Title	Year	Peak chart positions		Certifications	Album
Title	Year	US Rock Air.	US Rock Dig.	Certifications	Album
"Shelter"	2016	―	―		Carry
"Memphis"	2016	―	―		Non-album singles
"No Turning Back"	2017	―	―		Non-album singles
"Sober"	2018	―	―		Non-album singles
"Blame"	2019	―	―		Non-album singles
"Sunday" (Note: Later included on In Defense of My Own Happiness)	2019	―	―		In Defense of My Own Happiness (The Beginnings)
"Blink Twice"	2019	―	―		Non-album single
"Too High"	2020	―	―		In Defense of My Own Happiness (The Beginnings)
"Unwelcoming"	2020	―	―		In Defense of My Own Happiness (The Beginnings)
"Bad Blood"	2020	―	―		In Defense of My Own Happiness (The Beginnings)
"Breathe Again" (Note: Later included on In Defense of My Own Happiness)	2020	―	―		In Defense of My Own Happiness (The Beginnings)
"Who Do I Turn To?"	2020	―	―		In Defense of My Own Happiness (The Beginnings)
"Mercy" (featuring Tim Gent)	2020	―	―		In Defense of My Own Happiness (The Beginnings)
"If You Got a Problem"	2020	―	―		In Defense of My Own Happiness
"I See America"	2020	―	―		In Defense of My Own Happiness
"Look Up"	2020	―	―		In Defense of My Own Happiness
"Mighty Die Young"	2020	―	―		In Defense of My Own Happiness
"My Girl"	2020	―	―		Non-album single
"Wish You the Best" (featuring Jensen McRae)	2021	―	―		In Defense of My Own Happiness
"Jordan"	2021	―	―		In Defense of My Own Happiness
"Sorry Isn't Good Enough"	2021	―	―		In Defense of My Own Happiness
"Bigger Man" (with Maren Morris)	2021	―	―		In Defense of My Own Happiness
"Who Are You"	2021	―	―		Non-album single
"Jingle Bells"	2021	―	―		Non-album single
"Keeping the Light On"	2022	―	―		Proof of Life
"Fortune Favors the Bold" (featuring Tim Gent)	2022	―	―		Non-album single
"Purple Haze"	2022	―	―		Proof of Life
"Sweet Symphony" (with Chris Stapleton)	2022	―	25	RIAA: Gold	Proof of Life
"Be Careful" (with Madi Diaz and S.G. Goodman)	2022	―	―		Non-album singles
"Power" (from the Al Sharpton documentary Loudmouth)	2022	―	―		Non-album singles
"Changes"	2023	―	―		Proof of Life
"We're All Gonna Die" (featuring Noah Kahan)	2023	46	–		Proof of Life
"Taking Things For Granted"	2023	―	―		Proof of Life

==== As featured artist ====
Title	Year	Peak chart positions		Album
Title	Year	US Adult	CAN AC	Album
"We Don't Know We're Living" (Lucie Silvas featuring Brandi Carlile and Joy Oladokun)	2021	―	―	Non-album single
"Someone Like You" (Noah Kahan featuring Joy Oladokun)	2021	27	50	I Was/I Am
"It's a Good Day (To Fight the System)" (Shungudzo featuring Joy Oladokun)	2022	―	―	TBA
"trophy" (Hayley Kiyoko with Joy Oladokun)		―	―	girls like girls the album

=== Music videos ===
Title	Year	Director(s)
"Sober"	2018	David O'Donohue
"Blame"	2019	TBA
"Sunday"	2019	Sami Lane
"If You Got a Problem"	2020	Noah Tidmore
"Wish You the Best" (featuring Jensen McRae)	2021	Noah Tidmore
"Sorry Isn't Good Enough"	2021	Noah Tidmore
"Purple Haze"	2022	Unknown
"Sweet Symphony" (featuring Chris Stapleton)	2022	Mason Allen and Nicki Fletcher
"Changes"	2023	Unknown

== Accolades ==
Year	Association	Category	Nominated work	Result	Ref
2021	Americana Music Award	Emerging Act of the Year	Herself	Nominated	
2022	GLAAD Media Award	Outstanding Breakthrough Music Artist	In Defense of My Own Happiness	Nominated	
