= Rob Persaud =

British music producer and songwriter

- Born: Robert Leon Persaud
- Origin: London, England
- Genres: Pop; indie rock; country; alternative rock; electronic rock
- Occupations: Record producer; songwriter; guitarist; pianist
- Years active: 1999–present
- Website: robpersaud.com

Rob Persaud is a British music producer and songwriter who currently works and resides between Los Angeles, California and Nashville, Tennessee. He is published by Dr. Luke's Prescription Songs. He has produced, engineered, mixed or written tracks for Jay Sean, Lady Gaga, Chris Lane, Mollie King, Jordan Fisher, Before You Exit, Sabrina Carpenter, Josh Groban, Madison Beer, Nick Jonas, Breland, Billy Currington and others.

== Selected discography ==
Year	Artist	Song title	Album	Label	Role
2023	Anthonia Edwards	"All I Do Is Try"	single	EMI Records	producer, writer,
2023	Jonny Brenns	"Don't Waste Your Breath On Me"	single	Marcel Records	producer, writer,
2023	Nouri	"Anybody"	single	ACTS Music Group	producer, writer, mixer
2022	Jillian Jaqueline	"Honeymoon"	Single	Universal	writer
2022	Jojo Mason	"Hungover Alone"	Single	Universal	writer
2021	Billy Currington	"Intuition"	Album	Mercury Nashville	producer, writer, Mixer
2021	Justin Gray	"2 Wrongs"	single	Indie	producer, mixer
2021	Chandler Borrelli	"Molly"	single	AWAL	producer, writer, mixer
2021	Jaden Michaels	"Every Last Thing"	single	Warner Chappel	writer
2021	WILD	"That Was Us"	Goin Back	Nettwerk	Co-writer
2021	Crystal Skies	"Crazy While We're Young"	single	BMG	writer
2020	Shadow Boxers	"Animals"	Animals		writer
2020	Breland	"Real Men Don't Cry"	Rage And Sorrow	Atlantic	co-producer, writer
2020	Kelsy Karter	"Stick To Your Guns"	Missing Person	BMG	producer, writer
2020	Kelsy Karter	"Villain"	Missing Person	BMG	producer, writer
2019	Mat Kearney	"Changes"	Crazytalk	Ten Out of Tenn	writer
2019	Chord Overstreet	"On The Way"	Man On The Moon	Universal	producer, writer
2019	Shadow Boxers	"How Many Ways"	How Many Ways		producer, writer
2018	Chord Overstreet	"Sex Is On Fire"	single	Universal Music	producer
2018	Borgeous	"Only Love"	single	Spinnin Records	writer
2018	SEEB	"Nice To Meet You"	single	Universal Music	writer
2018	Sabrina Carpenter	"PRFCT"	Singular: Act 1	Hollywood Records	producer, writer
2018	Daughtry	"Gravity"	Cage to Rattle	RCA	writer
2018	Cody Simpson	"Sun Go Down"	Wave One	Universal Music	co-producer
2017	New Kids on the Block	"Thankful"	Thankful EP	Kobalt	producer, writer
2017	Jeremy Thurber	"Find You in The Dark"	single	Formula & Heart	producer, writer
2016	Daniel Skye	"Last Call"	single	RCA Records	producer, writer
2016	Baddluck	"Oath"	single	Cherrytree Records	producer, writer
2016	Sabrina Carpenter	"Shadows"	Evolution	Hollywood Records	producer, writer
2016	Sabrina Carpenter	"Don't Want It Back"	Evolution	Hollywood Records	producer, writer
2016	Mollie King	"Back to You"	single	Island Records UK	producer, writer
2016	Jordan Fisher	"Lookin' Like That"	single / Jordan Fisher EP	Hollywood Records	producer, writer
2016	Chris Lane	"Back to Me"	Girl Problems	Big Loud Records	writer
2016	Before You Exit	"Suitcase"	All the Lights	RCA Records	producer, writer
2015	Madison Beer	"Something Sweet"	single	Independent	producer, writer
2013	Jay Sean	"Guns N' Roses"	Neon	Cash Money, Republic Records	producer, writer
2010	Josh Groban	"Straight to You"	Illuminations	Reprise Records	producer, writer
2010	Blue	"How's a Man Supposed to Change?"	Guilty	Virgin Records	producer, writer

== Film and television credits ==
Year	Project	Song	Type	Studio	Role
2016	The TD Jakes Show	"It Takes A Village"	theme song	OWN (Oprah Winfrey Network)	composer, producer, writer
2015	Dinotrux	"Build It Up"	theme song	DreamWorks Animation	composer, producer, writer
2015	All Hail King Julien	"She Won't Give Up"	custom song	DreamWorks Animation	composer, producer, writer
