= Renell Medrano =

American photographer

Renell Medrano (born 1992) is a Dominican-American photographer and music video director.

== Early life ==
Medrano was raised in the Bronx, New York. She began photography at the age of 14. She attended Parsons School of Design, where she earned her BFA in Photography in 2014.

== Career ==
Medrano first gained attention for her senior thesis project, "Untitled Youth."

She has photographed album art for ASAP Ferg, H.E.R., Justin Bieber and Chaka Khan. Most notably, she shot the cover art for Kendrick Lamar's 2022 album Mr. Morale & the Big Steppers.

Her work has been featured in publications including The New York Times, Harper's Bazaar, and W.

In 2024 she won the ICP's Infinity Award for Commercial and Editorial Photography. That same year, Medrano launched Ice Magazine, a photography magazine inspired by 1970s periodical Players.

== Exhibitions ==
- 2019: Peluca, MILK studios, New York
- 2020: Pampara, Gallery Rosenfeld, London
- 2024: Lambón, WSA, New York

== Videography ==
- Lorde – "Hammer" (2025)
- Bad Bunny – "NUEVAYoL" (2025)
- Baby Keem – "Good Flirts" (2026)
- Gracie Abrams – "Hit the Wall" (2026)
