= Hit the Wall =

Single by Gracie Abrams

from the album Daughter from Hell
- Released: May 14, 2026
- Genre: Synth-pop
- Length: 3:14
- Label: Interscope
- Songwriters: Gracie Abrams; Aaron Dessner
- Producers: Gracie Abrams; Aaron Dessner

Gracie Abrams singles chronology
"Call Me When You Break Up" (2025)	"Hit the Wall" (2026)	"Look at My Life" (2026)

Music video
- "Hit the Wall" on YouTube

"Hit the Wall" is a song by American singer-songwriter Gracie Abrams from her third studio album, Daughter from Hell. It was released on May 14, 2026, through Interscope Records. Abrams wrote and produced the song alongside Aaron Dessner.

== Background ==
In an interview with People on January 7, 2026, Abrams teased her upcoming third studio album, saying that she was "beyond ready for [the album] to belong to everyone else". She said she had "never felt this way about anything" she had made before, which was "driving [her] crazy". Regarding the anticipation surrounding the album, she said she "loved the feeling" but also felt "kind of calm" about it, instead appreciating the time she had spent with the record and the people she worked with.

In March 2026, Abrams regularly shared glimpses on her Instagram, including photos of herself, moments with collaborators like Aaron Dessner and Bella Blasko, and a leather-bound journal marked with the number "3" and a sticker reading "witch". On April 20, she posted a small portion of a song playing on her phone to her Instagram. On May 1, 2026, she revealed the name of the album's lead single titled "Hit the Wall".

== Release and commentary ==
"Hit the Wall" was released on May 14, 2026. The song describes the personal struggles impacting a relationship. It is a synth-pop song. Following the single's release, Abrams described the song as more about the feeling of being at "the end of your rope" rather than just struggling in a romantic relationship. She also said it was a relief to write the single because it allowed Abrams to process unwanted emotions that she was experiencing. ABC Audio noticed how the single had an upbeat tone. Still, the lyrics described someone in a relationship crisis because of mental health issues.

== Music video ==
The music video was directed by Renell Medrano. In the video, Abrams appears lost as she opens a series of blue doors that lead to different dreamlike scenarios. Abrams described this as an homage to Joni Mitchell's 1971 album Blue. In one of the doors, Abrams is in a hospital bed while doctors hold up inkblots, while another opens to a corridor with twins waiting at the end. This is a reference to the Stanley Kubrick's 1980 horror film The Shining.

== Charts ==
Chart performance for "Hit the Wall"
Chart (2026)	Peak position
Australia (ARIA)	22
Belgium (Ultratop 50 Flanders)	47
Canada Hot 100 (Billboard)	23
Canada AC (Billboard)	28
Canada CHR/Top 40 (Billboard)	13
Canada Hot AC (Billboard)	16
Croatia International Airplay (Top lista)	99
Denmark Airplay (Tracklisten)	12
Estonia Airplay (TopHit)	91
Germany (GfK)	76
Global 200 (Billboard)	45
Ireland (IRMA)	14
Japan Hot Overseas (Billboard Japan)	16
Lebanon (Lebanese Top 20)	10
Netherlands (Single Top 100)	84
New Zealand (Recorded Music NZ)	24
Portugal (AFP)	80
Singapore (RIAS)	15
Sweden Heatseeker (Sverigetopplistan)	7
Switzerland (Schweizer Hitparade)	43
UK Singles (Official Charts)	18
US Billboard Hot 100	26
US Adult Pop Airplay (Billboard)	11
US Pop Airplay (Billboard)	12

== Certifications ==
Certifications for "Hit the Wall"
Region	Certification	Certified units/sales
United Kingdom (BPI)	Silver	200,000^{‡}
^{‡} Sales+streaming figures based on certification alone.

== Release history ==
Release dates and formats for "Hit the Wall"
Region	Date	Format	Label(s)	Ref.
Various	May 14, 2026	Digital download; streaming	Interscope	
Italy	May 15, 2026	Radio airplay	EMI	
United States	May 19, 2026	Contemporary hit radio	Interscope	
