= The Over Country Tour =

2027 concert tour by Lizzy McAlpine

- Tour by Lizzy McAlpine
- Location: Europe; North America; Oceania
- Associated album: Angel
- Start date: February 2, 2027
- End date: July 17, 2027
- Legs: 3
- No. of shows: 56
- Supporting acts: Mila Bea; Worthitpurchase; Flythe; SRCHR; Sydney Ross Mitchell; Searows; Post Animal

Lizzy McAlpine concert chronology
- The Older Tour (2024); The Over Country Tour (2027)

The Over Country Tour is the upcoming fourth concert tour by American singer-songwriter Lizzy McAlpine in support of her fourth studio album, Angel (2026). It will begin on February 2, 2027, in Adelaide, and will conclude on July 17, 2027, in Seattle, comprising 56 shows across North America, Europe and Oceania.

== Background ==
On September 24, 2026, McAlpine announced a 49-date international tour, titled "The Over Country Tour", in support of her fourth studio album, Angel. The tour was announced five days after the album's release and is scheduled to visit Australia, New Zealand, Europe, the United Kingdom, Canada and the United States between February and July 2027. Alongside the announcement, it was revealed that artist presales would begin between September 29 and 30, depending on the territory, with tickets going on general sale beginning September 30 in Australia and New Zealand and October 2 in Europe, the United Kingdom and North America.

The tour is scheduled to begin on February 3, 2027, at Thebarton Theatre in Adelaide, Australia, and conclude on July 17 at Climate Pledge Arena in Seattle. The North American leg will include performances at several of McAlpine's largest venues to date, including Madison Square Garden, the Kia Forum, Chase Center, United Center and Red Rocks Amphitheatre.

Due to "phenomenal demand", extra dates got added for Adelaide and London.

== Tour dates ==
List of 2027 concerts, showing date, city, country, and venue
Date (2027)	City	Country	Venue	Opening act(s)
February 2	Adelaide	Australia	Thebarton Theatre	Mila Bea
February 3	Adelaide	Australia	Thebarton Theatre	Mila Bea
February 5	Perth	Australia	Red Hill Auditorium	Mila Bea
February 7	Sydney	Australia	TikTok Entertainment Centre	Mila Bea
February 10	Melbourne	Australia	Sidney Myer Music Bowl	Mila Bea
February 12	Brisbane	Australia	Riverstage	Mila Bea
February 14	Auckland	New Zealand	Te Paepae Theatre	Mila Bea
March 6	Barcelona	Spain	Sala Apolo	Worthitpurchase
March 8	Paris	France	L'Olympia	Worthitpurchase
March 11	Munich	Germany	TonHalle	Worthitpurchase
March 12	Vienna	Austria	Gasometer	Worthitpurchase
March 14	Prague	Czech Republic	SaSaZu	Worthitpurchase
March 15	Warsaw	Poland	Stodoła	Worthitpurchase
March 17	Berlin	Germany	Columbiahalle	Worthitpurchase
March 19	Oslo	Norway	Sentrum Scene	Worthitpurchase
March 22	Stockholm	Sweden	Cirkus	Worthitpurchase
March 23	Copenhagen	Denmark	Poolen	Worthitpurchase
March 25	Cologne	Germany	Palladium	Worthitpurchase
March 26	Amsterdam	Netherlands	AFAS Live	Worthitpurchase
March 31	London	England	O_{2} Academy Brixton	Flythe; SRCHR
April 1	London	England	O_{2} Academy Brixton	Flythe; SRCHR
April 2	London	England	O_{2} Academy Brixton	Flythe; SRCHR
April 4	Manchester	England	Aviva Studios	Flythe; SRCHR
April 5	Manchester	England	Aviva Studios	Flythe; SRCHR
April 7	Birmingham	England	O_{2} Academy Birmingham	Flythe; SRCHR
April 9	Glasgow	Scotland	O_{2} Academy Glasgow	Flythe; SRCHR
April 10	Glasgow	Scotland	O_{2} Academy Glasgow	Flythe; SRCHR
April 12	Dublin	Ireland	3Arena	Flythe; SRCHR
April 30	Dallas	United States	The Bomb Factory	Sydney Ross Mitchell
May 1	Houston	United States	713 Music Hall	Sydney Ross Mitchell
May 3	Atlanta	United States	Fox Theatre	Sydney Ross Mitchell
May 4	Durham	United States	Durham Performing Arts Center	Sydney Ross Mitchell
May 6	Columbus	United States	Palace Theatre	Sydney Ross Mitchell
May 7	Detroit	United States	Fox Theatre	Sydney Ross Mitchell
May 9	Indianapolis	United States	Clowes Memorial Hall	Sydney Ross Mitchell
May 10	Milwaukee	United States	Riverside Theater	Sydney Ross Mitchell
May 12	Minneapolis	United States	State Theatre	Sydney Ross Mitchell
May 13	Minneapolis	United States	State Theatre	Sydney Ross Mitchell
May 15	St. Louis	United States	Stifel Theatre	Sydney Ross Mitchell
May 17	Kansas City	United States	Midland Theatre	Sydney Ross Mitchell
May 18	Oklahoma City	United States	Civic Center Music Hall	Sydney Ross Mitchell
June 16	Nashville	United States	Bridgestone Arena	Searows; Post Animal
June 18	Philadelphia	United States	Xfinity Mobile Arena	Searows; Post Animal
June 20	Boston	United States	Agganis Arena	Searows; Post Animal
June 21	Boston	United States	Agganis Arena	Searows; Post Animal
June 24	New York City	United States	Madison Square Garden	Searows; Post Animal
June 25	Columbia	United States	Merriweather Post Pavilion	Searows; Post Animal
June 27	Toronto	Canada	Scotiabank Arena	Searows; Post Animal
June 29	Chicago	United States	United Center	Searows; Post Animal
July 2	Austin	United States	Moody Center	Searows; Post Animal
July 6	Morrison	United States	Red Rocks Amphitheatre	Searows; Post Animal
July 9	San Diego	United States	The Rady Shell at Jacobs Park	Searows; Post Animal
July 10	Inglewood (Note: Labeled as Los Angeles in promotion material.)	United States	Kia Forum	Searows; Post Animal
July 13	San Francisco	United States	Chase Center	Searows; Post Animal
July 15	Portland	United States	Theater of the Clouds	Searows; Post Animal
July 17	Seattle	United States	Climate Pledge Arena	Searows; Post Animal
