= Feels Like (disambiguation) =

Feels Like is a 2015 album by Bully.

Feels Like may also refer to:

- Apparent temperature, a temperature equivalent as perceived by humans
- "Feels Like", a 2021 song by Gracie Abrams from This Is What It Feels Like (EP)
- "Feels Like", a 2022 song by Lucky Daye from the album Candydrip
- "Feels Like", a 2013 song by Peking Duk
- "Feels Like..." a 2017 song by Ho99o9 from the album United States of Horror

== See also ==
- This Is What It Feels Like (disambiguation)
