= This Is What It Feels Like (disambiguation) =

"This Is What It Feels Like" is a 2013 song by Armin van Buuren featuring Trevor Guthrie.

This Is What It Feels Like may also refer to:

- This Is What It Feels Like (EP), a 2021 EP by Gracie Abrams
- "This Is What It Feels Like", a song by Banks from the 2014 studio album Goddess
- This Is What It Feels Like, a 2019 EP by Clinton Kane

== See also ==
- This Is What the Truth Feels Like, a 2016 album by Gwen Stefani
- Feels Like (disambiguation)
