= Good Riddance =

Good Riddance may refer to:

- Good Riddance (film), Les Bons débarras, 1979 French-language Canadian drama film directed by Francis Mankiewicz
- Good Riddance (band), California punk band
- "Good Riddance (Time of Your Life)", song by Green Day
- Good Riddance (album), a 2023 album by Gracie Abrams
