= Sophie May (singer) =

English musician (born 1999)

- Born: Sophie May Jackson; October 1999 (age 27)
- Genres: Folk pop; indie folk; indie pop
- Occupations: Singer-songwriter; guitarist; musician
- Instruments: Vocals; guitar
- Years active: 2020–present
- Labels: Psychic; Believe UK
- Website: sophiemay.uk

Sophie May Jackson (born October 1999) is an English singer-songwriter and guitarist. After three EPs, her debut album, Stars and Teeth, was released in 2026.

== Early life ==
The daughter of Australian writer Kellie Jackson and an English-Australian father, May grew up in East Dulwich, South London. She began writing slam poems when she was 13, which translated into her songwriting. She attended Hurtwood House.

== Career ==
May began her career playing pub nights. During the COVID-19 lockdown, May gained attention and an online following of over 200,000 through short song clips and demos she uploaded to TikTok. In April 2022, May released her debut single, "With the Band", which quickly garnered over a million streams, alongside an additional track "Bruises and Scratches". This was followed by the dual singles "Bad Man", and "High Life" the next month well as "Drop in the Ocean" in June. Via Psychic Music, her debut 7-track EP You Do Not Have to Be Good was released in August 2022. She made her festival debut at Barn on the Farm, featured in Live at Leeds, and had gigs in London supporting Matt Maltese, Ocean Alley, Inhaler, Sarah Kinsley, and Spector.

In April 2023, May went to Australia, traveling around the country on the Groovin' the Moo circuit. Upon returning to England, she performed at the Great Escape Festival and Latitude Festival. May reunited with Maltese and Spector's Fred Macpherson for her second EP Worst Thoughts in the World, which was released on 9 August 2023 via Believe UK. Ahead of the EP's release came the singles "Doppelgänger" and "the Babysitter". This was followed by the mini-album Half-Songs in October. She also had gigs at 7 Layers Festival and Reeperbahn Festival.

At the start of 2024, May released the single "No More Birthdays". She was a featured artist at Liverpool Sound City. That summer, May released her next EP Deep Sea Creatures, accompanied by the singles "Tiny Dictator", which is based on her experiences with obsessive–compulsive disorder (OCD); "Brian Cox" featuring the titular physicist; and "Just Want You". A dual vinyl of her first two EPs You Do Not Have to Be Good and Worst Thoughts in the World became May's debut chart appearance in the United Kingdom on the Physical Albums Chart. In autumn 2024, May supported Searows on tour in Europe. She then embarked on tour in Australia, first as an opening act for Maltese before headlining her own dates, with support from Maia Toakley and Harper Bloom.

== Artistry ==
Growing up, May became interested in music through Amy Winehouse and Alex Turner, as well as the alternative rock and grunge her older brothers listened to. Turner's Submarine (2011) soundtrack "opened my eyes to the way lyrics could be written". She named her debut EP after a Mary Oliver poem. While learning guitar, May listened to Laura Marling, Paul McCartney, Jeff Buckley, and Leonard Cohen. She has also named Joni Mitchell, Elliott Smith, Frank Ocean, and Lana Del Rey, as influences.

== Personal life ==
May has dyslexia and obsessive–compulsive disorder (OCD).

== Discography ==
=== Studio albums ===
List of studio albums, with title, release date, label, and formats shown
Title	Studio album details
Stars and Teeth	Released: 25 March 2026; Label: Sophie May (independent), Psychic; Format: LP, digital download, streaming

=== Compilation albums ===
List of compilation albums, with title, release date, label, formats, and selected chart positions shown
Title	Studio album details	Peak chart positions
Title	Studio album details	UK Phys.
You Do Not Have to be Good / Worst Thoughts in the World	Released: 12 August 2024; Label: Psychic (5060787900530); Format: LP	99

=== Mini-albums ===
List of mini-albums, with title, release date, label, formats, and selected chart positions shown
Title	Mini-album details
Half Songs / Half Songs 2	Released: 20 May 2025; Label: Sophie May (independent), Believe UK; Format: Digital download, streaming

=== Extended plays ===
List of extended plays, with title, release date, label, and formats shown
Title	EP details
You Do Not Have to be Good	Released: 5 August 2022; Label: Psychic; Formats: Digital download, streaming
Worst Thoughts in the World	Released: 16 August 2023; Label: Sophie May (independent), Believe UK; Formats: Digital download, streaming
Deep Sea Creatures	Released: 26 July 2024; Label: Sophie May (independent); Formats: Digital download, streaming

=== Singles ===
List of singles, with title, year released, and album details shown
Title	Year	Album
"With the Band"	2022	You Do Not Have to be Good
"Bruises and Scratches"	2022	Non-album single
"Bad Man"	2022	You Do Not Have to be Good
"High Life"	2022	You Do Not Have to be Good
"Drop in the Ocean"	2022	You Do Not Have to be Good
"Doppelgänger"	2023	Worst Thoughts in the World
"The Babysitter"	2023	Worst Thoughts in the World
"No More Birthdays"	2024	Non-album single
"Tiny Dictator"	2024	Deep Sea Creatures
"Brian Cox"	2024	Deep Sea Creatures
"Just Want You"	2024	Deep Sea Creatures
"Little Light"	2024	Non-album single
