= Etta Marcus =

English singer-songwriter (born 2001)

- Born: 26 January 2001 (age 25); Brixton, South London, England
- Genres: Alternative, Indie, Indie Rock
- Instruments: vocals, guitar, piano
- Years active: 2021–present
- Label: Polydor Records
- Website: https://ettamarcus.com

Etta Marcus (born 26 January 2001) is an English singer-songwriter from London, England.

== Early life ==
Marcus was born in Brixton, South London. She began playing the piano at the age of 8 and moved on to guitar when she was 10. Marcus began studying jazz at Trinity Laban Conservatoire of Music and Dance in her native London, but was kicked out during her first year. She then decided to dedicate her full attention to her own music.

== Career ==
Marcus released her debut single, "Hide & Seek", in October 2021, gaining a cult-like following soon after its release. She then released a second single, "Salt Lake City," a collaboration with Matt Maltese. These tracks would go on to form part of her debut EP, View from the Bridge. (2022) After being signed to Polydor Records, Marcus released "Crown", a song characterised by its distinct riff on the electric guitar, marking a shift from the dreamy, ethereal sound of her earlier music. "Crown", along with four other tracks, featured on her EP Heart-Shaped Bruise. In 2023, Marcus opened for Lana Del Rey in London.

Her debut album, The Death of Summer and Other Promises, was released in January 2024. Marcus promoted this album through a UK tour of the same name.

== Artistry ==
Marcus grew up in Brixton's jazz scene and "became obsessed with music" after listening to Richard Hawley's Coles Corner (2005). She said the former "will always be embedded in my music", while she often revisits the latter for inspiration. In addition, Marcus recalls her father listening to The Zutons, MGMT, and Gorillaz. She named her guitars in tribute to Everything but the Girl. Other artists who "had an impact on" Marcus in her youth include Alex Turner, the likes of Sade, David Bowie and Joni Mitchell, as well as Mazzy Star, Fiona Apple and Jeff Buckley.

Moving onto her second EP Heart-Shaped Bruise (2023), Marcus was influenced by Radiohead and The Strokes. A particularly "upbeat" track "Smile for the Camera" drew upon Fountains of Wayne, a band Marcus claimed do not "get the respect they deserve". Creatively, Marcus echoes Lorde and Tyler, the Creator.

Critics have compared Marcus to Lana Del Rey, Mazzy Star and Fiona Apple, primarily due to her aesthetic and small yet active fanbase.

== Discography ==
Information imported from Spotify.

Albums

- The Death of Summer and Other Promises (2024)

=== Extended Plays ===
- View from the Bridge (2022)
- Heart-Shaped Bruise (2023)
- Devour (2025)

=== Singles ===
- "Hide & Seek" (2021)
- "Salt Lake City" (2021)
- "Crown" (2022)
- "Nosebleed" (2022)
- "Mechanical Bull" (2023)
- "Theatre" (2023)
- "Little Wing" (2023)
- "Snowflake Suzie" (2023)
- "Girls That Play" (2024)
- "Death Grips" (2024)
- "Girls Are God's Machines" (2025)
- "Teenage Messiah" (2025)
