= Bad Contestant =

Studio album by Matt Maltese
- Released: 8 June 2018
- Length: 39:04
- Label: Atlantic Records UK
- Producer: Alex Burey; Jonathan Rado; Hugo White

Matt Maltese chronology
Bad Contestant (2018)	Krystal (2019)

Singles from Bad Contestant
- 1. "Greatest Comedian" Released: 6 March 2018; 2. "Like a Fish" Released: 6 April 2018; 3. "Nightclub Love" Released: 20 March 2018; 4. "Bad Contestant" Released: 11 May 2018; 5. "Misery" Released: 25 May 2018

Professional ratings
Aggregate scores
Source	Rating
AnyDecentMusic?	7.9/10
Metacritic	80/100
Review scores
Source	Rating
DIY	5/5 stars
Clash	8/10
The Line of Best Fit	8/10
Loud and Quiet	7/10
MusicOMH	4/5 stars
NME	4/5 stars
Q	4/5 stars

Bad Contestant is the debut studio album by British-Canadian singer Matt Maltese. It was released on 8 June 2018 through Atlantic Records UK.

== Track listing ==
All tracks are written by Matt Maltese; "Greatest Comedian" additionally written by Alex Burey.

Bad Contestant track listing
No.	Title	Producer(s)	Length
1.	"Greatest Comedian"	Alex Burey; Jonathan Rado	2:47
2.	"Bad Contestant"	Rado	2:53
3.	"Sweet 16"	Rado	3:39
4.	"Like a Fish"	Burey	3:21
5.	"Nightclub Love"	Burey	4:10
6.	"Less and Less"	Rado	4:08
7.	"Misery"	Rado	2:31
8.	"Strange Time"	Burey	3:20
9.	"Guilty"	Rado	3:06
10.	"As the World Caves In"	Hugo White	3:38
11.	"Mortals"	Rado	5:25
Total length:			39:04
