= Krystal (album) =

Studio album by Matt Maltese
- Released: 8 November 2019
- Length: 40:22
- Label: 7476
- Producer: Matt Maltese; Vegyn; Alex Burey

Matt Maltese chronology
Bad Contestant (2018)	Krystal (2019)	Good Morning It's Now Tomorrow (2021)

Professional ratings
Aggregate scores
Source	Rating
AnyDecentMusic?	7.4/10
Metacritic	86/100
Review scores
Source	Rating
DIY	3.5/5 stars
Dork	4/5 stars
Gigwise	8/10 stars
The Line of Best Fit	8/10
Loud and Quiet	7/10
NME	4/5 stars
Paste	7.3/10

Krystal is the second studio album by British-Canadian singer Matt Maltese. It was released on 8 November 2019 through 7476 Records.

== Track listing ==
All tracks are written and produced by Matt Maltese, except where noted.

Krystal track listing
No.	Title	Writer(s)	Producer(s)	Length
1.	"Rom-Com Gone Wrong"			3:25
2.	"Tall Buildings"			3:08
3.	"Tokyo"			3:04
4.	"Wish You'd Ask Me"			2:59
5.	"Jupiter"		Vegyn	2:48
6.	"Intolewd"			1:19
7.	"Krystal"			3:40
8.	"Curl up & Die"			3:22
9.	"Human Remains"	Maltese; Alexanda William Burey	Alex Burey	3:48
10.	"When You Wash Your Hair"			3:12
11.	"Somebody I Don't Know the Name Of" (demo)			3:33
12.	"Wedding Singer" (demo)			3:40
13.	"All 9 Lives" (demo)			3:18
Total length:				40:22
