= This Is What It Feels Like (EP) =

EP by Gracie Abrams
- Released: November 12, 2021
- Genre: Bedroom pop
- Length: 37:51
- Label: Interscope
- Producers: Aaron Dessner; Joel Little; Gracie Abrams; Blake Slatkin; Omer Fedi; Carter Lang; Sarah Aarons

Gracie Abrams chronology
Minor (2020)	This Is What It Feels Like (2021)	Good Riddance (2023)

Singles from This Is What It Feels Like
- 1. "Feels Like" Released: October 1, 2021; 2. "Rockland" Released: October 22, 2021; 3. "Alright" Released: November 10, 2021

This Is What It Feels Like is the second extended play (EP) by American singer and songwriter Gracie Abrams. It was released on November 12, 2021, through Interscope Records. Abrams co-wrote all the tracks, and as a producer on "Feels Like", which served as the lead single for the project. The production was mainly handled by Abrams, Aaron Dessner, Joel Little, and Blake Slatkin.

== Background ==
Instead of this "full-length" being released as Abrams' debut album, it is being billed as a "project". It continues with the "emotional territory" that is first heard on her EP Minor.

== Tour ==
This Is What It Feels Like Tour
- Tour by Gracie Abrams
- Promotional poster for European dates
- Location: Europe; North America
- Associated album: This Is What It Feels Like
- Start date: February 2, 2022
- End date: May 31, 2022
- No. of shows: 37
- Supporting act: Alix Page

Gracie Abrams concert chronology
- I've Missed You, I'm Sorry Tour (2021); This Is What It Feels Like Tour (2022); Good Riddance Tour (2023-2024)

In support of This Is What It Feels Like, Abrams scheduled the This Is What It Feels Like Tour. It covers North America and Europe with 35 dates. It started on February 2, 2022, in Salt Lake City and concluded on May 31, 2022, in Stockholm. Her shows in Toronto on October 27, and Montreal on October 28, were canceled. Alix Page opened for Abrams. Along with her headlining tour, Abrams also opened for Olivia Rodrigo on the Sour Tour for select dates, where she sang songs featured on the project.

== Track listing ==
This Is What It Feels Like track listing
No.	Title	Writer(s)	Producer(s)	Length
1.	"Feels Like"	Gracie Abrams; Blake Slatkin; Omer Fedi	Abrams; Slatkin; Carter Lang	2:32
2.	"Rockland"	Abrams; Aaron Dessner	Dessner	3:37
3.	"For Real This Time"	Abrams; Joel Little; Sarah Aarons	Little	3:14
4.	"Camden"	Abrams; Dessner	Dessner; Slatkin	4:06
5.	"The Bottom"	Abrams; Slatkin; Fedi; Billy Walsh	Slatkin; Fedi	3:00
6.	"Wishful Thinking"	Abrams; Little; Aarons	Abrams; Little; Aarons	2:41
7.	"Older"	Abrams	Slatkin	3:07
8.	"Better"	Abrams; Little; Aarons	Little	2:51
9.	"Hard to Sleep"	Abrams; Dessner	Dessner	4:15
10.	"Augusta"	Abrams; Dessner	Dessner	3:58
11.	"Painkillers"	Abrams	Slatkin	2:05
12.	"Alright"	Abrams; Slatkin; Jeremih; Mick Schultz; Keith James	Slatkin	2:24
Total length:				37:51

== Personnel ==
Credits are adapted from the album's liner notes and Tidal.

- Gracie Abrams – lead vocals (all tracks), songwriting (all tracks), production (1)
- Blake Slatkin – production (1, 5, 7, 11–12), executive producer (12), additional vocals (1), songwriting (1, 5, 12), bass (1), guitar (1, 12), programming (1)
- Aaron Dessner – production (2, 4, 9–10), songwriting (2, 4, 9–10), acoustic guitar (2, 4, 10), bass guitar (2, 10), drum machine (2, 4, 9), drum programming (2, 4, 9), electric guitar (2, 4), percussion (2, 4, 10), piano (2, 4, 9), synthesizer (2, 4, 9), keyboards (4, 9)
- Joel Little – production (3, 6, 8), songwriting (3, 6, 8), bass (6, 8), guitar (6), keyboards (6, 8), synthesizer (6, 8)
- Omer Fedi – production (5), songwriting (1, 5), guitar (1)
- Carter Lang – production (1), bass (1), programming (1)
- Mick Schultz – co-production (12)
- Bryce Dessner – orchestration (2, 4, 9–10)
- Benjamin Lanz – synthesizer (2, 4, 9–10)
- Yuki Numata Resnick – violin (2, 4, 9–10)
- Clarice Jensen – cello (2, 4, 9–10)
- James McAlister – drum machine (2), drum programming (2), synthesizer (2)
- Ryan Olson – drum machine (2, 4, 9)
- James Krivchenia – drums (2), percussion (2)
- Rob Moose – viola (7), violin (7)
- Sean Hurley – electric bass (12)

== Charts ==
2021–2022 chart performance for This Is What It Feels Like
Chart (2021–2022)	Peak position
US Heatseekers Albums (Billboard)	14
US Top Album Sales (Billboard)	94

2025 chart performance for This Is What It Feels Like
Chart (2025)	Peak position
Belgian Albums (Ultratop Flanders)	176

== Release history ==
Region	Date	Format(s)	Label
Various	November 12, 2021	Digital download, streaming	Interscope
Various	April 8, 2022	LP	Interscope
Various	November 20, 2026	CD	Interscope
