= Matt Maltese =

English singer-songwriter (born 1995)

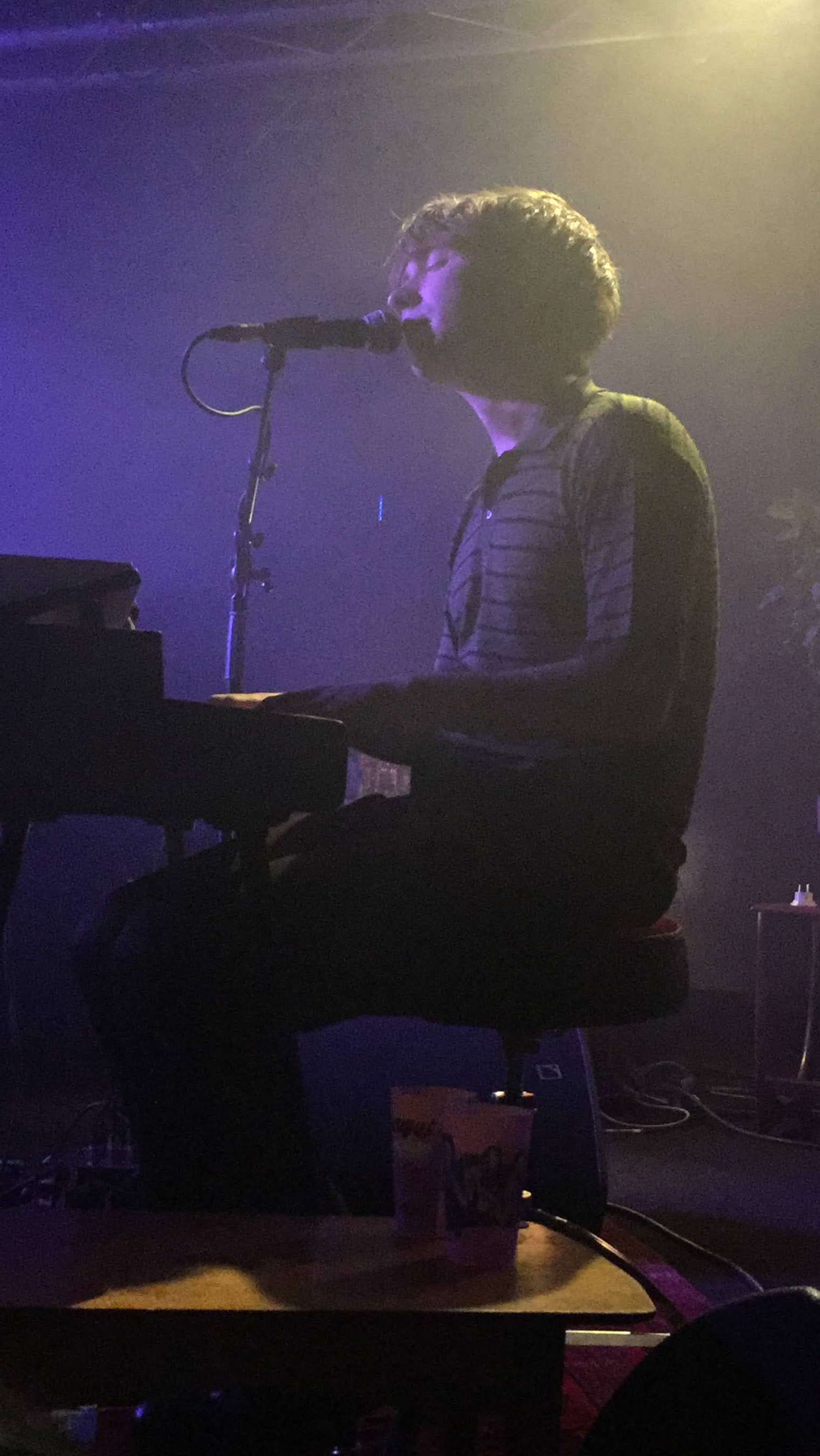
- Maltese in 2022

Background information
- Born: Matthew Jonathan Gordon Maltese; 6 October 1995 (age 31)
- Origin: Reading, England
- Genres: Indie rock; indie pop; alternative pop; chamber pop
- Occupations: Musician; singer-songwriter
- Instruments: Piano; guitar; bass; vocals; organ
- Years active: 2015–present
- Labels: Nettwerk Music Group; Atlantic Records UK; Café Bleu Recordings; sevenfoursevensix
- Website: matt-maltese.com

Matthew Jonathan Gordon Maltese (born 6 October 1995) is a British-Canadian singer-songwriter and record producer. His style blends elements from indie pop, indie rock, and chamber pop. Since releasing his debut single "Even If It's a Lie" in 2015, Maltese has released five studio albums, a cover album, and a number of EPs. Maltese's third studio album Good Morning It's Now Tomorrow was released in October 2021 via Nettwerk. Maltese released his fourth studio album Driving Just to Drive in April 2023.

== Early life ==
Matthew Jonathan Gordon Maltese was born on 6 October 1995 to Canadian parents; his father of Italian descent. Maltese was raised in Reading, England. He attended the Henley College, pursuing A Levels in Music, Maths, English and Economics. According to an interview with Vice he started writing music at the age of 14. When he was a teenager Maltese began buying and selling vinyl and with the money he made, moved to Camden, London.

== Career ==
=== 2015–2017: SoundCloud and early singles ===
Maltese released his first single, "Even If It's a Lie", on SoundCloud in 2015. There are also videos uploaded to YouTube with Matt playing early, unreleased songs. After the release of the single, Maltese signed with Café Bleu Recordings, a subdivision of Atlantic Records. In 2016, through Café Bleu Recordings, Maltese released his follow up EP, titled In a New Bed. The following year in 2017 Maltese released a single titled "As the World Caves In", the premise of which he stated was about the idea of then-UK Prime Minister Theresa May and then-U.S. President Donald Trump deciding to spend a night of romance together before triggering atomic warfare. The single saw a resurgence on TikTok starting in May 2021 following a cover by singer Sarah Cothran. In January 2023, it was certified Silver in the UK by the British Phonographic Industry (BPI) for selling 200,000 equivalent units.

=== 2018–2019: Bad Contestant and Krystal ===
In June 2018, Maltese released his debut album Bad Contestant. The album was produced by Jonathan Rado of American Indie rock duo Foxygen.

His sophomore album Krystal followed in November 2019. The album was mostly recorded, produced, and mixed by Maltese in his bedroom studio. With the release of Krystal, Maltese embarked on a UK headline tour in November 2019, he played on tour at six venues.

=== 2020–2021: Madhouse and Good Morning It's Now Tomorrow ===
In March 2020, Maltese released the single "Ballad of a Pandemic" about the COVID-19 pandemic; the single was released the same day as lockdown restrictions were imposed in the United Kingdom. This was followed by "Queen Bee" featuring vocals from Sorry's Asha Lorenz in May. In June 2020, Maltese took part in Tiny Gigs, a livestream event hosted by Tiny Changes, a mental health charity, to raise money for a COVID-19 relief fund.

Maltese released the single "Mystery" in May 2021. He then released another single in July 2021 called "Shoe" which was released following the announcement of Maltese's third studio album, Good Morning It's Now Tomorrow. The album was released in October 2021. He also released the EP Madhouse in August 2020.

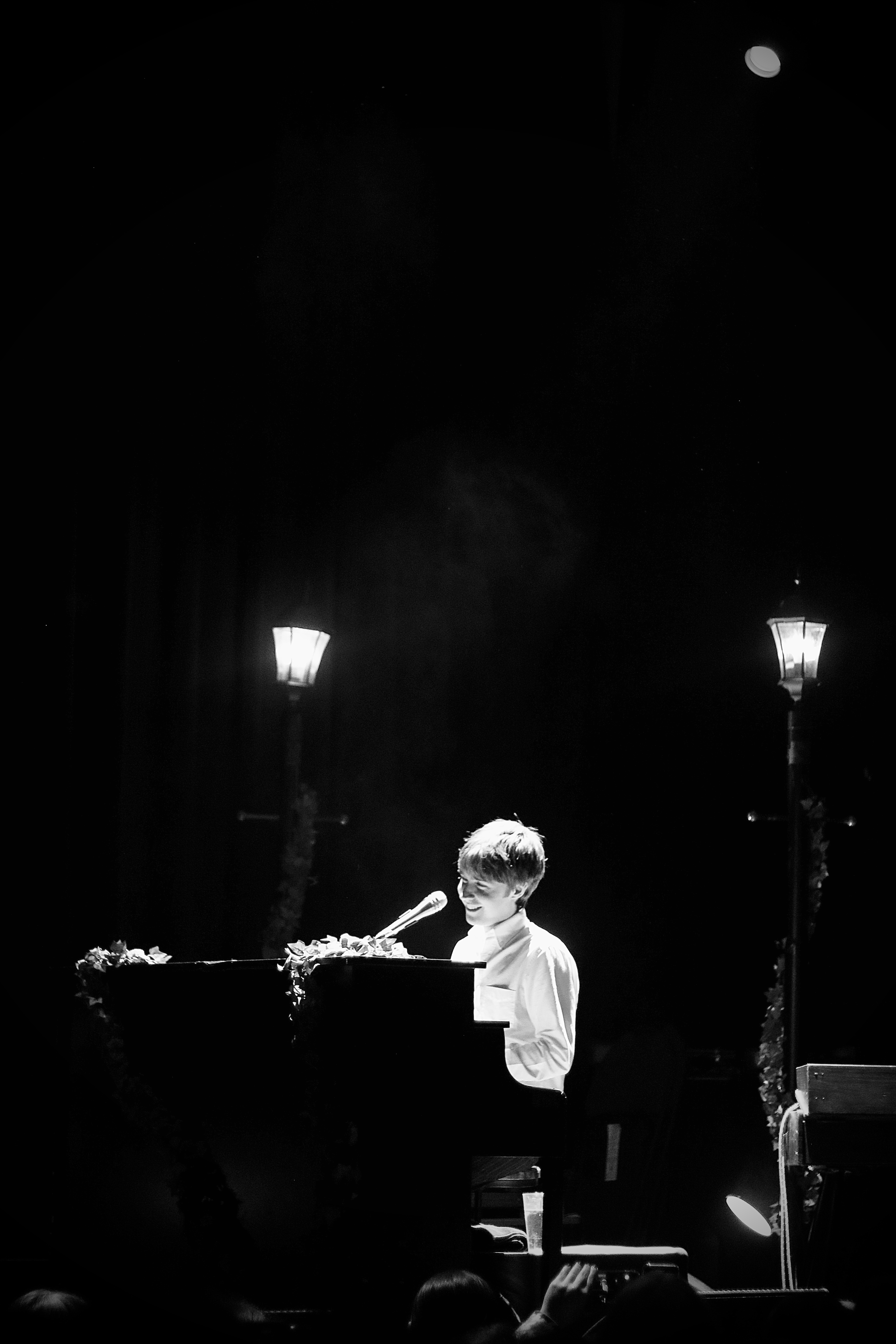
Maltese performing in 2024

=== 2022–present: Quiet Recordings, Driving Just to Drive, and Hers ===
In March 2022, Maltese released a new song called "Smile In the Face of the Devil" as a part of his new EP titled Quiet Recordings. This EP would be a collection of more ambient tracks off of his previous album Good Morning It's Now Tomorrow. Quiet Recordings was released on 8 April 2022.

Maltese's next single "Mother" was released in October 2022. In December 2022, Maltese teased his third album. He then released a teaser for a new track followed by a single in January 2023 titled "Driving Just to Drive". The same day as this single was released, Maltese announced the album would be titled Driving Just to Drive for a 28 April 2023 release date.

In 2024, Maltese published a cover album titled Songs That Aren't Mine. Maltese recorded a cover of "My Funny Valentine" for the 2025 tribute album Chet Baker Re:imagined.

Maltese released his fifth studio album, Hers, on the 16th of May 2025. It was preceded by the singles "Buses Replace Trains", "Anytime, Anyplace, Anyhow", "Always Some MF" and "Pined For You My Whole Life". As of October 2025, he has been working with Bella Ramsey on new music and released "Cure for Emptiness (with Bello)".

== Initiatives ==
Maltese has written for a number of other artists, including Birdy and Matilda Mann.

In summer 2023, Maltese founded his own record label titled Last Recordings On Earth. The label's inaugural release was the single "Older" by Searows.

In December 2024, Maltese composed the music for the Royal Shakespeare Company's production of Twelfth Night directed by Prasanna Puwanarajah, creating original music for William Shakespeare's text and an original song "Maybe This Christmas". The production played in Stratford-upon-Avon over the Christmas 2024 season, and will be revived at the Barbican Centre, London over the Christmas 2025 season.

== Artistry ==
The first song Maltese recalls being moved by is "Dreamer" by Supertramp. In a 2015 interview, Maltese said he would "always be into" Paul Simon, Nina Simone and Leonard Cohen. Upon moving to South London, Maltese became immersed in the local music landscape, looking towards artists such as Loyle Carner and Alex Burey. He named Vashti Bunyan, Flo Morrissey and Father John Misty as newer folk influences.

== Discography ==
Matt Maltese discography
- Studio albums: 5
- EPs: 4
- Singles: 31

=== Studio albums ===
List of studio albums, with selected details
Title	Details
Bad Contestant	Released: 8 June 2018; Label: Atlantic Records UK
Krystal	Released: 8 November 2019; Label: 7476
Good Morning It's Now Tomorrow	Released: 8 October 2021; Label: Nettwerk Music Group
Driving Just to Drive	Released: 28 April 2023; Label: Nettwerk Music Group
Songs That Aren't Mine	Released: 8 March 2024; Label: Tonight Matthew
Hers	Released: 16 May 2025; Label: Tonight Matthew / The Orchard

=== Extended plays ===
Title	Details
In a New Bed	Released: 22 April 2016; Label: Café Bleu Recordings
Blood, Sweat & Beers: Live at the Drugstore and Poems from the Road	Released: 2017; Label: Café Bleu Recordings
madhouse	Released: 7 August 2020; Label: Nettwerk Music Group
Quiet Recordings	Released: 8 April 2022; Label: Nettwerk Music Group

=== Singles ===
==== As lead artist ====
Maltese has released the following singles:

Year	Title	Album/EP
2015	"Even If It's a Lie"	Non-album singles
2016	"Vacant in the 21st Century"	Non-album singles
2016	"Strange Time"	Bad Contestant
2017	"As the World Caves In"	Bad Contestant
2017	"No One Won The War"	Non-album singles
2017	"Comic Life"	Non-album singles
2018	"Greatest Comedian"	Bad Contestant
2018	"Like A Fish"	Bad Contestant
2018	"Nightclub Love"	Bad Contestant
2018	"Bad Contestant"	Bad Contestant
2018	"Misery"	Bad Contestant
2020	"Tokyo (Italian Version)"	Krystal
2020	"Ballad of a Pandemic"	Non-album single
2020	"queen bee"	madhouse
2021	"Mystery"	Good Morning It's Now Tomorrow
2021	"Shoe"	Good Morning It's Now Tomorrow
2021	"You Deserve an Oscar"	Good Morning It's Now Tomorrow
2021	"Good Morning"	Good Morning It's Now Tomorrow
2021	"Nothing Breaks Your Heart Like Christmas"	Non-album single
2022	"Smile in the Face of the Devil"	Quiet Recordings
2022	"Mother"	Driving Just To Drive
2023	"Driving Just To Drive"	Driving Just To Drive
2023	"Museum"	Driving Just To Drive
2023	"Florence"	Driving Just To Drive
2023	"The Earth is a Very Small Dot"	Non-album single
2024	"Kiss Me"	Songs That Aren't Mine
2024	"Philadelphia (feat. Searows)"	Songs That Aren't Mine
2024	"This Is The Day"	Songs That Aren't Mine
2025	"Anytime, Anyplace, Anyhow"	Hers
2025	"Always Some MF"	Hers
2025	"Pined For You My Whole Life"	Hers
2025	"Buses Replace Trains"	Hers

==== As featured artist ====
Year	Title	Album/EP
2022	"Cate's Brother (Matt's Version)" (with Maisie Peters)	Non-album single
2021	"Salt Lake City" (with Etta Marcus)	View from the Bridge
2025	"Trust" (with Vegyn)	The Road to Hell is Paved with Good Intentions
2026	"Some Birds Don't Fly" (with Gotts Street Park)	Some Birds Don't Fly

=== Select songwriting and production credits ===
Year	Artist	Song(s)	Album
2020	Matilda Mann	"Happy Anniversary, Stranger"	Because I Wanted You to Know
2021	Joy Crookes	"Skin"	Skin
2021	Mathilda Homer		If You Were On Fire
2022	Celeste	"To Love a Man"	Lately
2022	Jamie T	"Thank You"	The Theory of Whatever
2022	Sarah Cothran	"Funeral"	i hope you're happy
2022	Nemahsis	"Criminal"	—N/a
2022	April	"54321"	Starlane
2023	Hohnen Ford	"Don't Fall Asleep"	Infinity
2023	bb sway	"Leading Lady"	How Will I Get There?
2023	Etta Marcus	"Mechanical Bull"	—N/a
2023	Sophie May		Worst Thoughts in the World
2023	Etta Marcus	"Theatre"	The Death of Summer and Other Promises
2023	Etta Marcus	"Little Wing"	The Death of Summer and Other Promises
2023	Etta Marcus	"Snowflake Suzie"	The Death of Summer and Other Promises
2024	Etta Marcus	"Girls That Play"	The Death of Summer and Other Promises
2024	Etta Marcus	"Death Grips"	—N/a
2024	Sophie May	"Marianne"	Deep Sea Creatures
2024	Sophie May	"If I'd Never Been Born"	Deep Sea Creatures
2025	Celeste	"Everyday"	—N/a
2025	Tom Misch	"Old Man"	—N/a

== Tours ==
=== Headlining act ===
- Matt Maltese EU + US Autumn Tour (2022)

(with special guest Sophie May, Hohnen Ford, Searows)

- Matt Maltese US 2022 TOUR
- Matt Maltese Asia & Australia tour 2023
- Matt Maltese UK, Europe, The Americas "Touring Just to Tour" 2024
- Matt Maltese US, Canada, Europe "Tour For You My Whole Life" 2025

(with special guest Cornelia Murr)

=== Supporting act ===
- Wolf Alice UK and IRELAND TOUR (2022)
