= Good Riddance Tour =

2023–2024 concert tour by Gracie Abrams

- Tour by Gracie Abrams
- Promotional poster example
- Location: Europe; North America; Oceania
- Associated album: Good Riddance
- Start date: March 6, 2023
- End date: January 22, 2024
- No. of shows: 44
- Supporting acts: Searows; Tiny Habits

Gracie Abrams concert chronology
- This Is What It Feels Like Tour (2022); Good Riddance Tour (2023–2024); The Secret of Us Tour (2024–2025)

Good Riddance Tour was the third concert tour by American singer-songwriter Gracie Abrams, in support of her debut studio album, Good Riddance (2023). The tour began on March 6, 2023, in Chicago, Illinois, United States, and concluded on January 22, 2024, in Melbourne, Victoria, Australia.

== Background ==
Abrams announced the North American dates on January 9, 2023. The Australian dates were announced on August 15, 2023.

== Setlist ==
The set list from the show on March 6, 2023, in Chicago, Illinois, is not intended to represent all shows of the tour:

1. "Where Do We Go Now?"
2. "This Is What The Drugs Are For"
3. "21"
4. "Block Me Out"
5. "I Should Hate You"
6. "Friend"
7. "I Know It Won't Work"
8. "Full Machine"
9. "Amelie"
10. "Rockland"/"Will You Cry?"
11. "Difficult"
12. "Camden"
13. "Fault Line"
14. "Best"
15. "Feels Like"
16. "Minor"
17. "I Miss You, I'm Sorry"
18. "Right Now"

=== Notes ===
- At the show in Boston, Abrams performed "Abby" after "Feels Like", which was later released exclusively on vinyl, and sang "Augusta" after "Right Now".
- At the shows in Los Angeles, "405" was performed with Tiny Habits. The song was unreleased at the time.
- At the show in Manchester, "Amelie" was sung twice.
- Starting with the October 4 in London, "Mess It Up" was added to the setlist.
- At the January 18 show in Sydney, "In Between" was performed.
- At the January 19 show in Sydney, Abrams covered "American Teenager" by Ethel Cain after "Long Sleeves".
- At the January 21 show in Melbourne, Abrams sang "Long Sleeves" and "405".
- At the January 22 show in Melbourne, Abrams covered "Maroon" by Taylor Swift.

=== Surprise songs ===
Starting with the European leg, Abrams performed a surprise song at select shows.

- September 27 – Manchester: "Abby".
- October 1 – Bristol: "Stay"
- October 3 – London: "In Between"

=== Good Riddance Acoustic Shows ===
Abrams performed three acoustic shows titled "Good Riddance Acoustic Shows" across the US in fall 2023 with the albums co-writer and producer, Aaron Dessner.

- September 6 – New York: "I Know It Won't Work", "Best", "Camden", "Block Me Out", "This Is What The Drugs Are For", "Two People", "Rockland", "Where Do We Go Now?", "Fault Line", "I Should Hate You", "Amelie", and covered "Right Where You Left Me" by Taylor Swift.
- September 11 – Nashville: "Best", "I Know It Won't Work", "Block Me Out", "Camden", "This Is What The Drugs Are For", "Two People", a then unreleased song titled "I Knew It, I Know You", "Where Do We Go Now?", "Amelie", "Rockland", "I Should Hate You", and "Right Now".
- September 14 – Los Angeles: "Best", "I Know It Won't Work", "Block Me Out", "Camden", "This Is What The Drugs Are For", "Amelie", "405", "Where Do We Go Now?", a then unreleased song titled "Sad About It" which was renamed "Gave You I Gave You I", "I Should Hate You", covered "Invisible String" by Taylor Swift, and "Right Now".

=== The Eras Tour ===
She was featured as an opener for the 2023 and 2024 US legs of Taylor Swift's The Eras Tour.

Abrams was originally scheduled to open the May 7 show in Nashville, and the July 1 show in Cincinnati, but her set was cancelled due to weather for both shows.

2023 Setlist

1. "Where Do We Go Now?"
2. "21"
3. "Block Me Out"
4. "I Know It Won't Work"

2024 Setlist

1. "Risk"
2. "Blowing Smoke"
3. "I Love You, I'm Sorry"
4. "Where Do We Go Now?"
5. "That's So True"
6. "Tough Love"
7. "Free Now"
8. "Us"
9. "Close to You"

Notes

- Starting with her set in East Rutherford, "I Should Hate You" was added before "I Know It Won't Work".
- Following the cancellation of her set for the July 1 Cincinnati show, Taylor Swift invited Abrams on stage during her "Surprise Songs" set where they performed "I Miss You, I'm Sorry" together.
- Starting with her July 7 set in Kansas City, "I Miss You, I'm Sorry" was added as the last song.
- During the June 23, 2024 show in London, Abrams was a surprise guest during the "Surprise Songs" set and performed "Us" with Swift.

== Tour dates ==
Date (2023)	City	Country	Venue	Opener
March 6	Chicago	United States	House of Blues	Tiny Habits
March 7	Chicago	United States	House of Blues	Tiny Habits
March 9	Toronto	Canada	History	Tiny Habits
March 10	Montreal	Canada	MTELUS	Tiny Habits
March 12	Boston	United States	House of Blues	Tiny Habits
March 14	New York	United States	Irving Plaza	Tiny Habits
March 15	New York	United States	Brooklyn Steel	Tiny Habits
March 17	Philadelphia	United States	The Theatre of Living Arts	Tiny Habits
March 18	Washington, D.C.	United States	The Howard Theatre	Tiny Habits
March 20	Atlanta	United States	The Eastern	Tiny Habits
March 21	Nashville	United States	Marathon Music Works	Tiny Habits
March 22	Charlotte	United States	The Fillmore	Tiny Habits
March 25	Austin	United States	Emo's	Tiny Habits
March 26	Dallas	United States	The Echo Lounge & Music Hall	Tiny Habits
March 29	Los Angeles	United States	The Fonda Theatre	Tiny Habits
March 30	Los Angeles	United States	The Fonda Theatre	Tiny Habits
April 1 (Note: This show is one that Abrams opened for Taylor Swift on The Eras Tour.)	Arlington	United States	AT&T Stadium	—N/a
April 2 (Note: This show is one that Abrams opened for Taylor Swift on The Eras Tour.)	Arlington	United States	AT&T Stadium	—N/a
April 5	Portland	United States	Crystal Ballroom	Tiny Habits
April 7	Seattle	United States	The Showbox	Tiny Habits
April 8	Vancouver	Canada	Vogue Theatre	Tiny Habits
April 10	San Francisco	United States	The Fillmore	Tiny Habits
April 11	Berkeley	United States	The UC Theatre Taube Family Music Hall	Tiny Habits
April 14 (Note: This show is one that Abrams opened for Taylor Swift on The Eras Tour.)	Tampa	United States	Raymond James Stadium	—N/a
April 15 (Note: This show is one that Abrams opened for Taylor Swift on The Eras Tour.)	Tampa	United States	Raymond James Stadium	—N/a
April 21 (Note: This show is one that Abrams opened for Taylor Swift on The Eras Tour.)	Houston	United States	NRG Stadium	—N/a
April 22 (Note: This show is one that Abrams opened for Taylor Swift on The Eras Tour.)	Houston	United States	NRG Stadium	—N/a
April 23 (Note: This show is one that Abrams opened for Taylor Swift on The Eras Tour.)	Houston	United States	NRG Stadium	—N/a
April 28 (Note: This show is one that Abrams opened for Taylor Swift on The Eras Tour.)	Atlanta	United States	Mercedes-Benz Stadium	—N/a
April 29 (Note: This show is one that Abrams opened for Taylor Swift on The Eras Tour.)	Atlanta	United States	Mercedes-Benz Stadium	—N/a
May 5 (Note: This show is one that Abrams opened for Taylor Swift on The Eras Tour.)	Nashville	United States	Nissan Stadium	—N/a
May 14 (Note: This show is one that Abrams opened for Taylor Swift on The Eras Tour.)	Philadelphia	United States	Lincoln Financial Field	—N/a
May 21 (Note: This show is one that Abrams opened for Taylor Swift on The Eras Tour.)	Foxborough	United States	Gillette Stadium	—N/a
May 27 (Note: This show is one that Abrams opened for Taylor Swift on The Eras Tour.)	East Rutherford	United States	MetLife Stadium	—N/a
June 4 (Note: This show is one that Abrams opened for Taylor Swift on The Eras Tour.)	Chicago	United States	Soldier Field	—N/a
June 9 (Note: This show is one that Abrams opened for Taylor Swift on The Eras Tour.)	Detroit	United States	Ford Field	—N/a
June 16 (Note: This show is one that Abrams opened for Taylor Swift on The Eras Tour.)	Pittsburgh	United States	Acrisure Stadium	—N/a
June 23 (Note: This show is one that Abrams opened for Taylor Swift on The Eras Tour.)	Minneapolis	United States	U.S. Bank Stadium	—N/a
June 30 (Note: This show is one that Abrams opened for Taylor Swift on The Eras Tour.)	Cincinnati	United States	Paycor Stadium	—N/a
July 7 (Note: This show is one that Abrams opened for Taylor Swift on The Eras Tour.)	Kansas City	United States	GEHA Field at Arrowhead Stadium	—N/a
July 8 (Note: This show is one that Abrams opened for Taylor Swift on The Eras Tour.)	Kansas City	United States	GEHA Field at Arrowhead Stadium	—N/a
July 14 (Note: This show is one that Abrams opened for Taylor Swift on The Eras Tour.)	Denver	United States	Empower Field at Mile High	—N/a
July 15 (Note: This show is one that Abrams opened for Taylor Swift on The Eras Tour.)	Denver	United States	Empower Field at Mile High	—N/a
July 22 (Note: This show is one that Abrams opened for Taylor Swift on The Eras Tour.)	Seattle	United States	Lumen Field	—N/a
July 23 (Note: This show is one that Abrams opened for Taylor Swift on The Eras Tour.)	Seattle	United States	Lumen Field	—N/a
July 28 (Note: This show is one that Abrams opened for Taylor Swift on The Eras Tour.)	Santa Clara	United States	Levi's Stadium	—N/a
July 29 (Note: This show is one that Abrams opened for Taylor Swift on The Eras Tour.)	Santa Clara	United States	Levi's Stadium	—N/a
August 3 (Note: This show is one that Abrams opened for Taylor Swift on The Eras Tour.)	Inglewood	United States	SoFi Stadium	—N/a
August 7 (Note: This show is one that Abrams opened for Taylor Swift on The Eras Tour.)	Inglewood	United States	SoFi Stadium	—N/a
August 8 (Note: This show is one that Abrams opened for Taylor Swift on The Eras Tour.)	Inglewood	United States	SoFi Stadium	—N/a
September 6 (Note: This show is labeled as a Good Riddance Acoustic Show.)	New York	United States	McKittrick Hotel	—N/a
September 11 (Note: This show is labeled as a Good Riddance Acoustic Show.)	Nashville	United States	Riverside Revival Church	—N/a
September 14 (Note: This show is labeled as a Good Riddance Acoustic Show.)	Los Angeles	United States	Masonic Lodge at Hollywood Forever	—N/a
September 26	Dublin	Ireland	3Olympia Theatre	Searows
September 27	Manchester	England	Manchester Academy 1	Searows
September 28	Glasgow	Scotland	O2 Academy	Searows
September 30	Birmingham	England	O2 Academy	Searows
October 1	Bristol	England	O2 Academy	Searows
October 3	London	England	O2 Shepherd's Bush Empire	Searows
October 4	London	England	O2 Shepherd's Bush Empire	Searows
October 6	Paris	France	Le Bataclan	Searows
October 7	Brussels	Belgium	Magdalenazaal / Salle de la Madeleine	Searows
October 8	Amsterdam	Netherlands	Melkweg The Max	Searows
October 11	Cologne	Germany	Carlswerk Victoria	Searows
October 12	Hamburg	Germany	Große Freiheit 36	Searows
October 13	Berlin	Germany	Columbiahalle	Searows
October 15	Munich	Germany	Muffathalle	Searows
October 16	Zürich	Switzerland	X-TRA	Searows
October 18	Barcelona	Spain	Razzmatazz	Searows
October 20	Madrid	Spain	WiZink Center	Searows

Date (2024)	City	Country	Venue	Opener
January 15	Brisbane	Australia	Fortitude Music Hall	Tiny Habits
January 16	Brisbane	Australia	Fortitude Music Hall	Tiny Habits
January 18	Sydney	Australia	Hordern Pavilion	Tiny Habits
January 19	Sydney	Australia	Hordern Pavilion	Tiny Habits
January 21	Melbourne	Australia	Forum Theatre	Tiny Habits
January 22	Melbourne	Australia	Forum Theatre	Tiny Habits
