= Good Morning It's Now Tomorrow =

Studio album by Matt Maltese
- Released: 8 October 2021
- Length: 44:17
- Label: Nettwerk
- Producer: Matt Maltese; Tom Carmichael; the Six; Edd Holloway; Alex Burey

Matt Maltese chronology
Krystal (2019)	Good Morning It's Now Tomorrow (2021)	Driving Just to Drive (2023)

Singles from Good Morning It's Now Tomorrow
- 1. "Mystery" Released: 21 May 2021; 2. "Shoe" Released: 2 July 2021; 3. "You Deserve An Oscar" Released: 13 August 2021; 4. "Good Morning" Released: 24 September 2021

Professional ratings
Aggregate scores
Source	Rating
Metacritic	84/100
Review scores
Source	Rating
Clash	8/10
DIY	4/5 stars
Mojo	4/5 stars
NME	4/5 stars

Good Morning It's Now Tomorrow is the third studio album by British-Canadian singer Matt Maltese. It was released on 8 October 2021 through Nettwerk Music Group.

== Track listing ==
All tracks are written by Matt Maltese, and produced by Maltese and Tom Carmichael, except where noted.

Good Morning It's Now Tomorrow track listing
No.	Title	Writer(s)	Producer(s)	Length
1.	"Good Morning"			2:51
2.	"Shoe"			3:37
3.	"Everyone Adores You (At Least I Do)"			3:23
4.	"You Deserve an Oscar"			3:36
5.	"Lobster"			4:11
6.	"Outrun the Bear"			3:52
7.	"1000 Tears Deep"			3:14
8.	"We Need to Talk"	Danny Casio; Maltese	Maltese; Carmichael; the Six	3:09
9.	"Mystery"			3:43
10.	"Oldest Trick in the Book" (with Bedouine)	Aznive Korkejian; Maltese		3:21
11.	"Looking"	Edd Holloway; Gabe Wax; Maltese; Rose Elinor Dougall	Maltese; Carmichael; Holloway	2:56
12.	"Rat Race"	Alexanda William Burey; Maltese	Maltese; Carmichael; Alex Burey	2:58
13.	"Krakow"			3:23
Total length:				44:17
