= Hers (album) =

Studio album by Matt Maltese
- Released: May 16, 2025
- Genre: Chamber pop
- Length: 39:07
- Label: The Orchard
- Producer: Matt Maltese

Matt Maltese chronology
Songs That Aren't Mine (2024)	Hers (2025)

Hers is the sixth studio album by British-Canadian singer-songwriter Matt Maltese. It was released on 16 May 2025, by The Orchard.

== Background ==
Consisting of eleven tracks ranging between three and five minutes each with a total runtime of approximately thirty-nine minutes, the album is Maltese's first self-produced album since Krystal in 2019.

In October 2025, Maltese re-released "Cure for Emptiness", featuring Bella Ramsey under the alias Bello, followed by a music video.

== Reception ==
Professional ratings
Review scores
Source	Rating
AllMusic	4/5 stars
Clash	8/10 stars
DIY	4/5 stars
The Line of Best Fit	8/10 stars

Marcy Donelson of AllMusic noted, "Full of memorably wistful melodies as well as potentially relatable struggles, Hers feels like an instant classic, if one that's also outside of time." Daisy Carter of DIY Mag gave the album four stars and remarked, "And so, for sixth studio LP Hers, his conundrum was not one of execution, but evolution."

The Line of Best Fit assigned it a rating of eight out of ten, referring to the album as Maltese's "most ambitious, artful and affecting record to date," while Clash described it as "a beautiful glimpse of his creative essence," also giving it the same score.

== Track listing ==
All tracks are written by Matt Maltese, except "Buses Replace Trains" (written with Graham Johns) and "Always Some MF" (written with Alex Burey).

Hers track listing
No.	Title	Length
1.	"Arthouse Cinema"	3:01
2.	"Buses Replace Trains"	3:42
3.	"Happy Birthday"	3:36
4.	"Anytime, Anyplace, Anyhow"	3:46
5.	"Always Some MF"	4:38
6.	"Cure for Emptiness"	3:26
7.	"Holiday from Yourself"	3:26
8.	"Pined for You My Whole Life"	3:18
9.	"Eternal Darkness of the Spotted Mind"	3:15
10.	"Tangled"	3:46
11.	"Everybody's Just as Crazy as Me"	3:13
Total length:		39:07

== Personnel ==
Credits adapted from Tidal.

- Matt Maltese – lead vocals, piano, production
- James Nagadhana – bass guitar
- Jamie Staples – drums
- Joe Harris – electric guitar
