= Driving Just to Drive =

Studio album by Matt Maltese
- Released: 28 April 2023
- Length: 36:45
- Label: Nettwerk
- Producer: Matt Maltese; Josh Scarbrow

Matt Maltese chronology
Good Morning It's Now Tomorrow (2021)	Driving Just to Drive (2023)

Singles from Driving Just to Drive
- 1. "Mother" Released: 28 October 2022; 2. "Driving Just to Drive" Released: 20 January 2023; 3. "Museum" Released: 3 March 2023; 4. "Florence" Released: 31 March 2023

Professional ratings
Aggregate scores
Source	Rating
Metacritic	75/100
Review scores
Source	Rating
Clash	6/10
DIY	3.5/5 stars
Dork	4/5 stars
Gigwise	7/10 stars
NME	4/5 stars

Driving Just to Drive is the fourth studio album by British-Canadian singer Matt Maltese. It was released on 28 April 2023 through Nettwerk Music Group.

== Track listing ==
Driving Just to Drive track listing
No.	Title	Length
1.	"Mother"	3:13
2.	"Irony Would Have It"	3:28
3.	"Florence"	3:38
4.	"Mortician"	3:04
5.	"Museum"	3:35
6.	"Widows"	3:48
7.	"Coward" (with Biig Piig)	2:31
8.	"Driving Just to Drive"	3:32
9.	"Hello Black Dog"	3:14
10.	"Suspend Your Disbelief"	3:25
11.	"But Leaving Is"	3:12
Total length:		36:45
