= Alix Page =

American indie rock musician

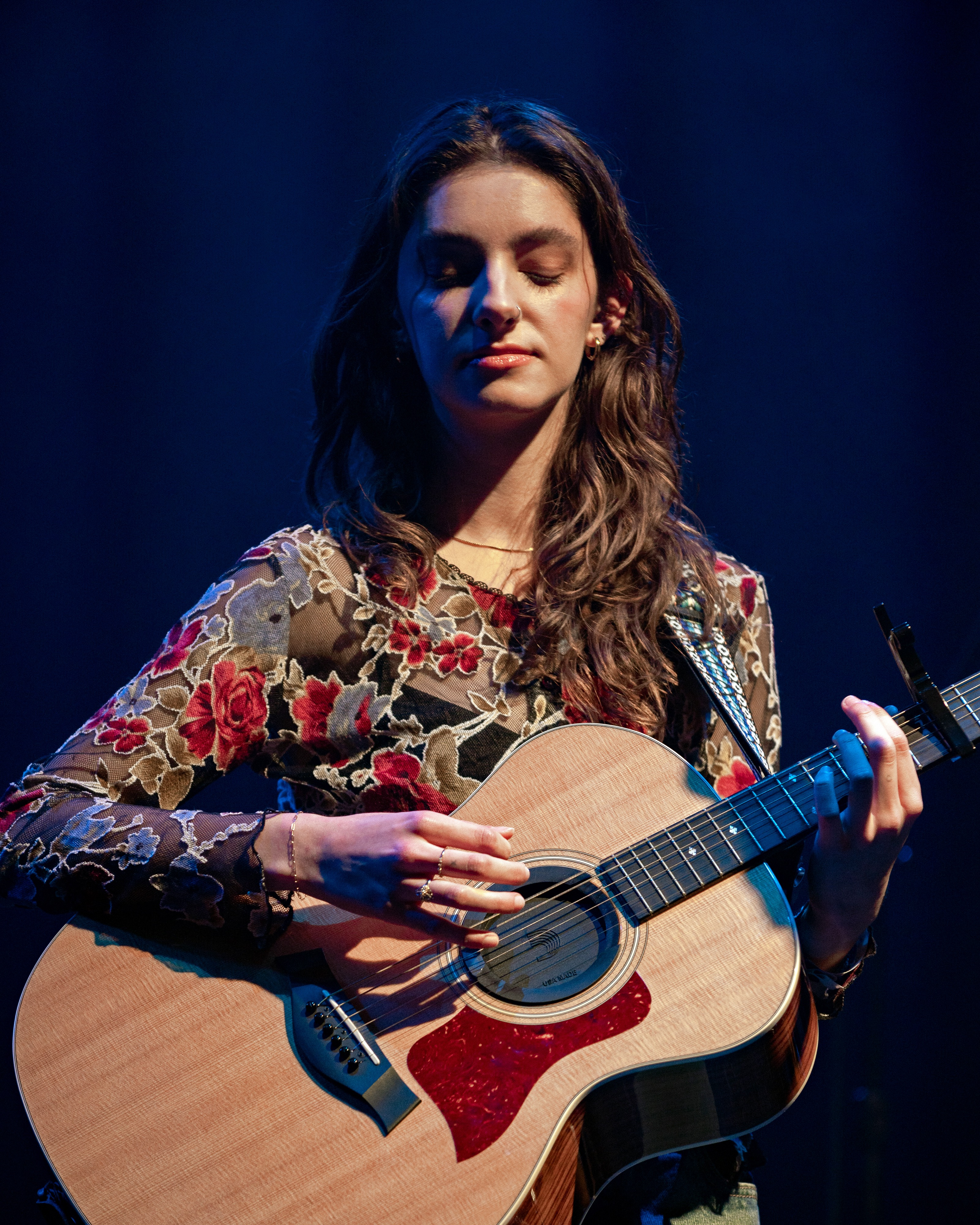
- Page in 2022
- Born: Alixandra Ferne Page; November 19, 2001 (age 24)
- Education: USC Thornton School of Music
- Occupation: Singer-songwriter
- Years active: 2017–present
- Parent: Keith Page
- Relatives: Avery Page (sister)
- Website: https://www.alixpage.com/

Alixandra Ferne Page, known professionally as Alix Page is an American singer-songwriter in the genre indie rock from the suburbs of Orange County, California. Page began songwriting in high school and has since released 2 EPs and was support for multiple tours, including Gracie Abrams and Jeremy Zucker

== Early life ==
Alix Page was born November 19, 2001, in Orange County, California. While attending The Orange County School of the Arts in Santa Ana, Page began making music, where she met her bandmates Caleb and Andrew. The two originally were a part of Page's previous band, and they continued to assist Page when she opted to pursue a solo career.

Growing up, Alix Page's grandma performed in pageants as a classical voice singer. She would also occasionally sing at Celebration of Life events, that her father, Keith Page, would lead.

Page attended USC Thornton School of Music and is currently represented by Wasserman.

== Career ==
Alix Page wrote her first song, "Here Now", in high school during second year followed by the song "Daisy". Both songs tied back to what was happening in Alix's personal and educational life at the time.

In 2020, she released her first single "Stripes" followed by her second single "Frank" as independent releases.

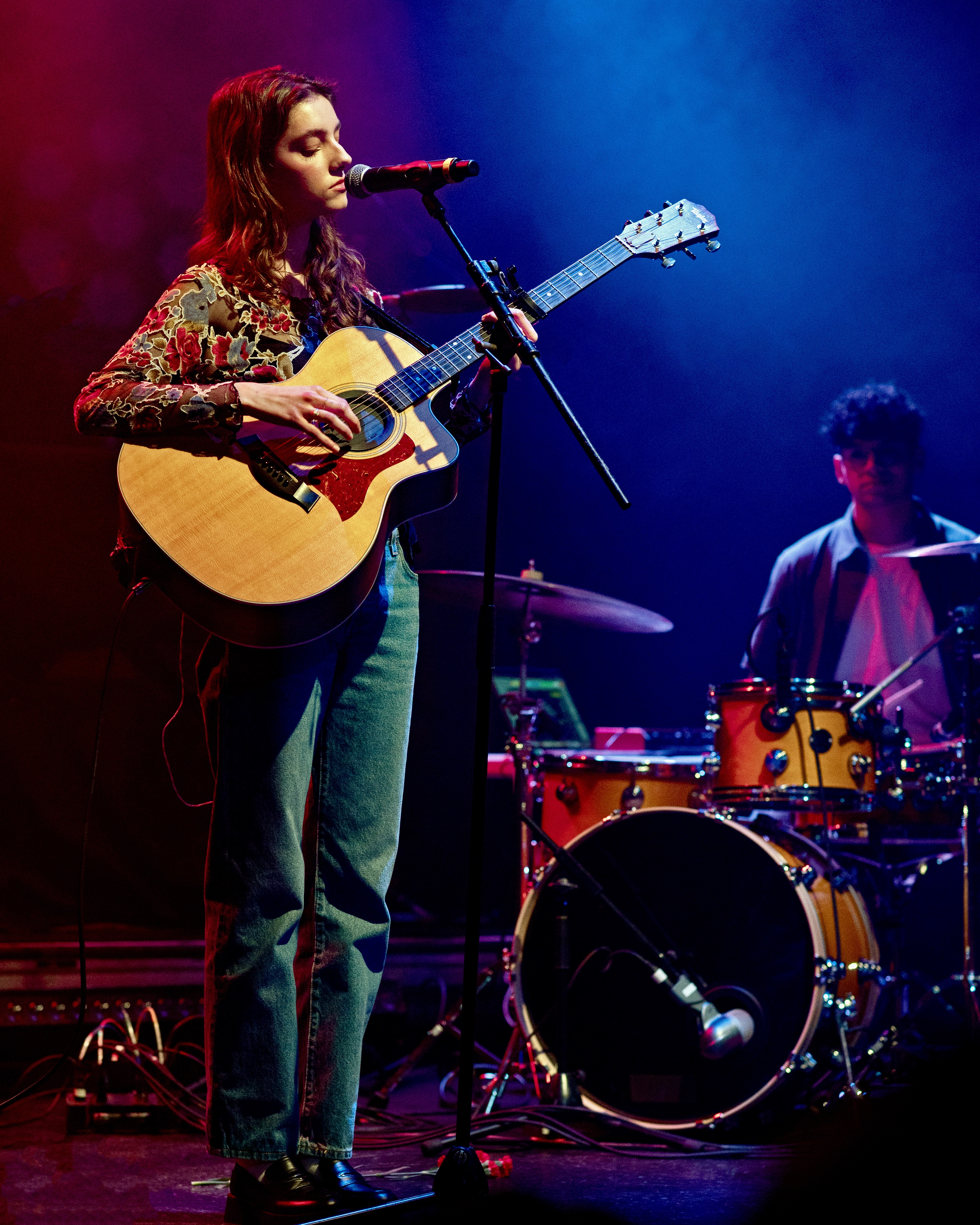
Alix Page at El Rey Theatre in 2022

Her 2021 single "Radiohead" was written about a dream Page had about moving into an apartment with an ex and was recorded in one take.

In 2022, Page collaborated with the Irish Singer-Songwriter and actor, Mark McKenna, for the song "Pulling Teeth" inspired by an ex of Page. Its accompanying video was shot in Long Beach, California. At age 19, Page released her debut EP in 2022 titled Old News. This EP included songs such as "True + Honest", which she wrote when she was 16, when she had written "Stripes" and "Frank". She also states that her song "Radiohead", featured on this EP, was inspired by an ex-boyfriend who loved Radiohead. "Radiohead", along with "June Gloom" and "25" were written mid-late 2020 and launched a "new era of new songs" for Page. Her song "June Gloom" was heavily inspired by Holly Humberstones song "Overkill", and Humberstone has soundtracked a lot of Alix's life.

"Goose", Page's 2023 EP, was written in inspiration of her friends and was produced with the help of Brett Kramer, her music program Director's husband. It was released by AWAL / Better Days.

In July 2024, Page released "Girlfriend" which was co-written by Alix Page, Andy Seltzer, and Lucy Healey about "meeting someone new, trying to play it cool, and sucking at it". Her upcoming EP was recorded at Jazzcats Studio. This release was followed in November 2024 with "Break The Band Up", written by Page, Andy Seltzer & Cameron Hale and produced by Hale & Andrew Pham.

On February 8th 2025, Page announced her single ‘Bug’ which was set to be released only 6 days later. With this, she also announced "Bug" her 3rd EP which released on March 14, 2025.

== Tour ==
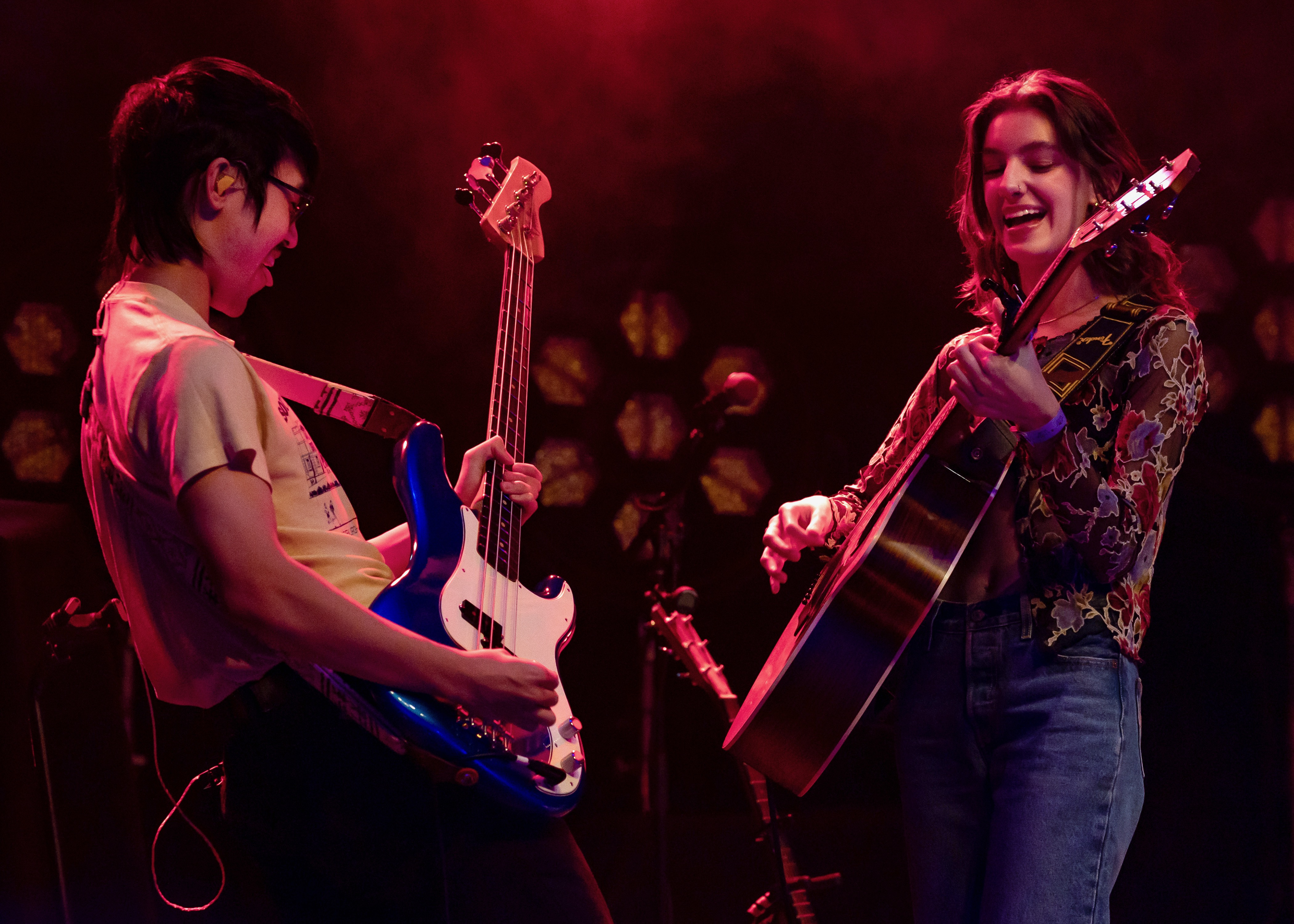
Alix Page with guitarist at El Rey Theatre in 2022

In 2022, Page opened for Gracie Abrams along with Ella Jane on the North American and European legs of her winter 2022 This Is What It Feels Like tour.

In 2023, she headlined her first tour, playing 10 shows cross the US, with support from Kristiane. Shortly after her US headlining shows, Page played 3 shows in the UK / EU with support from Jake Minch. In October that year, she and Minch would join on tour again in supporting Jeremy Zucker on his "Is Nothing Sacred" tour.

In 2024, Page opened for The Milk Carton Kids on their winter tour as well as opening for Sarah Kinsley on her fall tour.

In February 2025, Page announced her second headlining tour, focusing primarily on her third E.P. 'Bug'. This tour begins April 29th and ends May 17th 2025 and spans the United States as well as a Toronto date.

== Discography ==
Single releases
Title	Release date
Bug	2025
Break The Band Up	2024
Girlfriend	2024
4Runner	2023
Automatic	2023
Just For Now (Cover)	2022
Pulling Teeth	2022
Half The Story	2022
Radiohead	2021
25	2021
Frank	2020
Stripes	2020

EP releases
Title	Year released	Tracklist
Bug	2025	1. Break the Band Up; 2. Girlfriend; 3. Bug; 4. Sweet; 5. Prank Call; 6. Bb
Goose	2023	1. Goose; 2. Automatic; 3. 4Runner; 4. How Could I 5. Toothache
Old News	2022	1. True + Honest; 2. June Gloom; 3. Radiohead; 4. 25
