= Good Riddance (album) =

Studio album by Gracie Abrams
- Released: February 24, 2023
- Studio: Long Pond (Hudson Valley)
- Genre: Pop
- Length: 52:24
- Label: Interscope
- Producer: Aaron Dessner

Gracie Abrams chronology
| This Is What It Feels Like (2021) | Good Riddance (2023) | The Secret of Us (2024) |

Singles from Good Riddance
- 1. "Difficult" Released: October 7, 2022; 2. "Where Do We Go Now?" Released: January 13, 2023; 3. "Amelie" Released: February 10, 2023; 4. "I Know It Won't Work" Released: February 24, 2023

Good Riddance is the debut studio album by the American singer-songwriter Gracie Abrams. It was released on February 24, 2023, through Interscope Records. After the release of two acclaimed extended plays (EPs), Abrams began recording Good Riddance at Aaron Dessner's Long Pond Studio in the Hudson Valley, New York, across 25 non-consecutive days. The album was produced by Dessner and written by both Abrams and Dessner. The producer Matias Tellez provided additional production on "I Know It Won't Work" and "Where Do We Go Now?", the musician Brian Eno co-wrote and co-produced the closing track. A deluxe edition of the album with four bonus tracks was released on June 16, 2023.

Good Riddance is primarily a pop album with whispered vocals, drawing from a moody and electronic sonic palette. Following themes of guilt, heartbreak, self-identity, personal accountability, and coming of age, the album was written about friendships, family, and Abrams's breakup with Blake Slatkin. It was promoted by four singles and the Good Riddance Tour, which passed across North America, Europe, and Australia. Critics gave the album generally favorable reviews; they praised Abrams's confessional songwriting, but had a mixed response to Dessner's production. It peaked at number 52 on the Billboard 200, and several publications featured it on their year-end lists of the best albums of 2023.

== Background ==
Gracie Abrams was interested in journaling and playing the piano since age eight. Though she thought she'd never consider performing music professionally, she released her debut extended play (EP) Minor in 2020, followed by This Is What It Feels Like in 2021. The EPs helped gain her attention from high-profile musicians such as Billie Eilish, Lorde, Olivia Rodrigo, and Phoebe Bridgers. Minor inspired Rodrigo's Billboard Hot 100 number-one single "Drivers License" in 2021. The EPs also received critical acclaim. Throughout 2022, Abrams joined Rodrigo's Sour Tour and headlined the This Is What It Feels Like Tour. She later drew the attention of Taylor Swift, who invited her to open for the Eras Tour. According to NME, This Is What It Feels Like had the makings of a debut album, but she did not consider it a "cohesive work" and was too "chaotic internally" to think of a debut album. Abrams chose the title Good Riddance because while it sounds harsh, she liked its satirical side, "To be comfortable casually throwing certain things away and walking into the next chapter no matter what that looks like". She also felt that there were shifts in her personal life while creating the album, so she said "good riddance" to "versions of [herself] that [she] didn't recognize anymore".

== Writing and recording ==
When writing Good Riddance, Abrams practiced on becoming accountable and a better partner in future relationships. She enlisted her returning collaborator Aaron Dessner of the National, who worked on This Is What It Feels Like, as the album's producer and co-writer. It was recorded at Dessner's Long Pond Studio in the Hudson Valley, New York. She would often work 12-hour days and write up to two songs a day while staying with Dessner and his family at Long Pond. She had recently gone through a breakup with the producer Blake Slatkin during the early stages of writing the album and felt insecure when writing about the breakup. Dessner convinced Abrams to move forward with writing and recording the songs, telling her that "holding space for brutal honesty in songwriting is kind of the whole point". The two would often have "long and honest conversations about love, life, and everything in between".

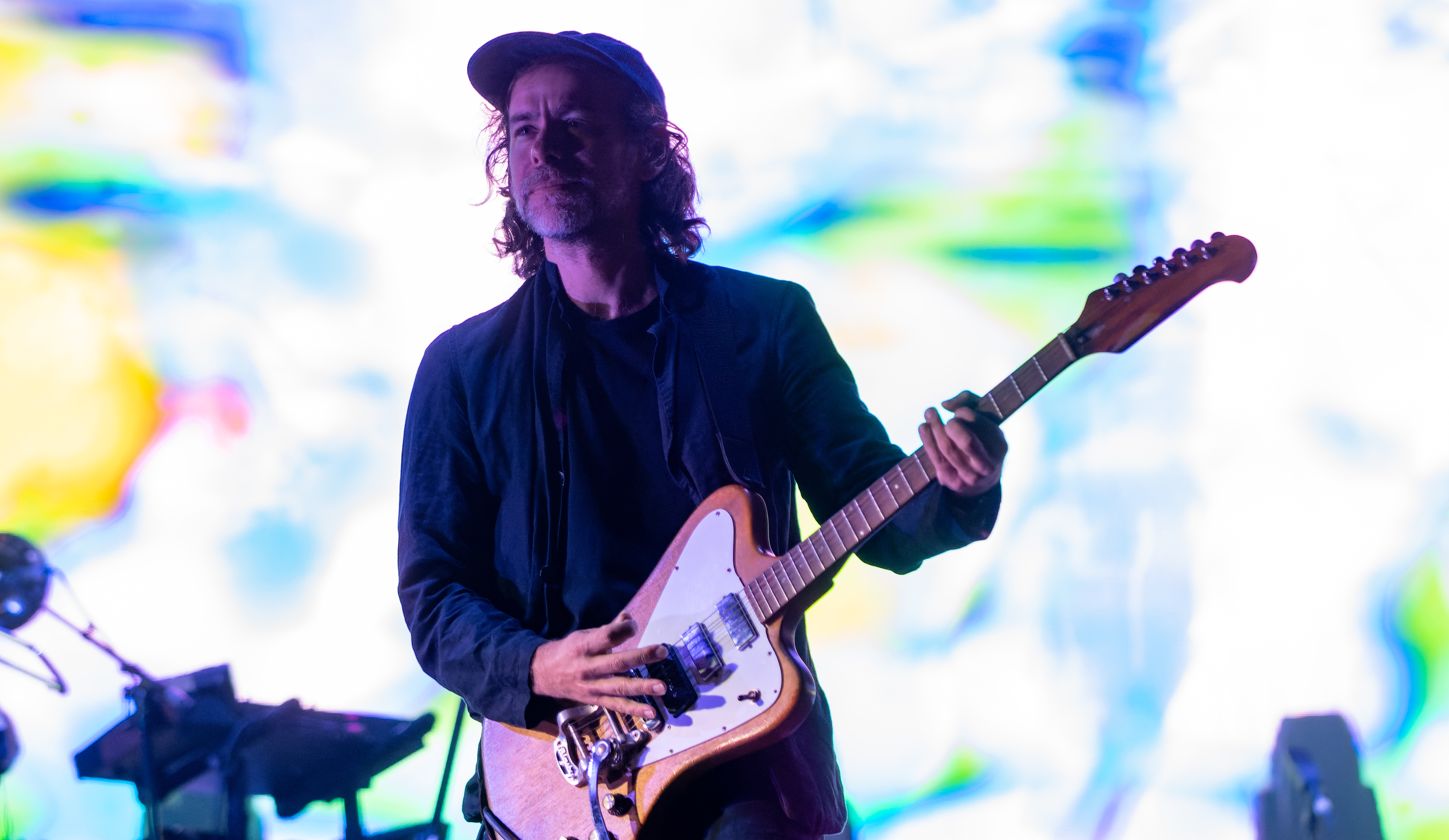
Good Riddance was produced and recorded by Aaron Dessner at his own Long Pond Studio.

Abrams had been a fan of the National since age 12. She was introduced to Dessner through the lawyer they share during 2019 because the lawyer felt that she and Dessner would get along. Early development of Good Riddance started when Dessner invited her to record at Long Pond during 2021, making ten songs. Over the course of two years, Abrams would visit Long Pond for five or ten days at a time to work with Dessner. They both got to the "core" of Good Riddance during spring 2022. When working with Dessner, she said that she did not "feel remotely filtered in any capacity". She felt lucky to evolve without Slatkin, another of her former collaborators, and safe to "figure out" her sound with Dessner when writing Good Riddance. Abrams felt that recording in Long Pond had a sense of familiarity, was isolated from distractions, and was more inspiring and comfortable compared to recording in Los Angeles. She also said that Dessner has the ability to make people "feel safe to explore the most raw parts of themselves". The album was recorded in around 25 days.

Abrams wrote the lyrics to the song "Amelie" in a journal entry a long time before recording the song. It was recorded in one take as Dessner played the guitar while she sang the lyrics. She felt that the natural feeling and trust between herself and Dessner while recording was shown in the song. She named the songs "I Know It Won't Work", "Best", and "Fault Line" as the most difficult to write. All of the songs were written quickly, and she said "The ease at which a lot of the words came out was the painful part". She was also worried about how the album's songs would be received, as she did not want someone to think a song was written about them when it was not. The producer Matias Tellez provided additional production on the tracks "I Know It Won't Work" and "Where Do We Go Now?" and the musician Brian Eno co-produced the closing track "Right Now". Abrams finished her contributions to the album on September 7, 2022.

== Composition ==
=== Overview ===
The standard edition of Good Riddance includes 12 tracks; the deluxe edition contains four additional tracks. The album predominantly has a pop sound, with an influence of indie rock. Isabella Miller of Clash said that the album has elements of "alternative folk blended with playful electronics". Jane Bua of Pitchfork classified the album as "whisperpop" while Miller labelled the album as "sad girl pop". Miller also wrote that "there's an evident shift in the direction of [Abrams's] sound" and attributed it to either Dessner's production or "a deliberate choice from Abrams". The Forty-Five's Cordelia Lam believed the album pulls from a moody and electronic sonic palette. Hannah Mylrea of NME commented that the album holds similarities to the music of Bridgers and Folklore (2020) by Swift.

Good Riddance was written about Abrams's breakup with Slatkin, friendships, and family. The album presents Abrams's distinctive whispered vocals addressing themes of guilt, heartbreak, self-identity, personal accountability, and coming of age. Martyn Young of Dork wrote that the tracks "begin delicately before swelling to quietly epic proportions". Saloni Gajjar of The A.V. Club called the album "soft and quiet, but also soothing and heartbreaking at the same time". Dork wrote that the album is "a journey through a spectrum of emotions" and that "each song blossoms from a whisper to a crescendo, encapsulating the most simple yet resonant feelings". Maya Georgi of Rolling Stone described the album's melodies as "soft-spoken" and "simple", and said they are "steeped in sadness but still pack a punch". Critics universally called Abrams's songwriting confessional. (Note: Attributed to multiple references:)

=== Songs ===
On the album's opening track, "Best", Abrams analyzes her misgivings in a relationship and takes responsibility for them. The second track, "I Know It Won't Work", is an indie rock song about "breaking off a relationship with a partner who won't go easily", as described by Lam. She also described the production in "Full Machine" as consisting of "cool, moody textures" and that the track is "a thoughtful and revelatory exploration of the relationships by which we define our lives and what happens to them when we change." "Where Do We Go Now?" contains "swooning" strings, synthesizers, and repeated loops of the title. The song is about Abrams hurting somebody she loves and being unsure of what to do next. Lyndsey Havens of Billboard commented that "the song eventually becomes less about the status of her relationship to another person and more about the status of anyone's relationship with the world around them". The following "I Should Hate You" discusses the "complex position of wanting to hate someone she still loves" as the "dejected" and "intensifying" pop track plays out. "Will You Cry?" further alludes to Abrams's breakup with Slatkin, examining her mental health, family and friends, and the sorrows of going through her early 20s. On the track, she admits that there is nothing left in the relationship and that if she does not end the relationship, she would lose herself.

For Pitchfork, Bua described "Amelie" as "bewitching" and commented that it "captures a sense of aching beauty that stands out amongst the album's more passive moments" atop a finger-picked acoustic guitar and dim piano notes. She also proposed the idea that " 'Amelie' could be anyone: a past lover, a lost childhood friend, an alter ego". Hannah Dailey of Billboard called it "a tender love letter to the ways a stranger can permanently alter our lives without realizing". Its lyrics question whether Amelie is a real person or if Abrams's memory is playing tricks on her. The theme of guilt is again explored on the high-energy and upbeat "Difficult". It explores feelings such as losing friends, going to therapy, and the guilt of moving away from home alongside the following "This Is What the Drugs Are For". The track recalls Abrams's use of drugs to numb the pain of the memories of her past relationship. Gajjar called it evocative. "Fault Line" acknowledges the faults of her ex-partner. It also reveals that Abrams had recovered from their breakup. The penultimate song "The Blue" marks a turning point in the album's theme, focusing on a new love after Abrams recovered from her ex-partner. While the earlier tracks have more dejected themes, the track is hopeful and optimistic. The album's final track of the standard edition, "Right Now", reflects on the difficulty of life and leaving the past behind atop simplistic production that is powered by droning synthesizers. The deluxe edition of Good Riddance includes the extra songs "Block Me Out", "Unsteady", "405", and "Two People".

== Promotion and release ==
The lead single to Good Riddance, "Difficult", was released on October 7, 2022. On January 9, 2023, Abrams announced the album and the North American leg of the Good Riddance Tour, which began on March 6. The second single, "Where Do We Go Now?", was released on January 13, and was accompanied by a music video directed by Gia Coppola. The album's third single "Amelie" released on February 10. The album's track list was unveiled on February 6, and the album was released by Interscope Records on February 24, alongside "I Know It Won't Work" premiering as the fourth single. Its deluxe edition was announced on April 24, 2023, and released on June 16. It added four bonus tracks, including "Block Me Out", which was released as a single on April 8, 2022. On August 15, 2023, she announced Australian dates of the Good Riddance Tour, which began on January 15, 2024. During September 2023, she performed the Good Riddance Acoustic Shows across North America with Dessner. A live album recorded on the tour was released on vinyl on February 23, 2024. She also embarked on the European leg of the Good Riddance Tour throughout September and October 2023. A live version of "I Know It Won't Work" was released on a 7-inch single backed with a demo of "Abby" on November 9, 2023. On December 14, 2023, Abrams made her debut on The Tonight Show Starring Jimmy Fallon, performing "I Should Hate You".

== Critical reception ==
Professional ratings
Aggregate scores
| Source | Rating |
|---|---|
| AnyDecentMusic? | 7.3/10 |
| Metacritic | 73/100 |
Review scores
| Source | Rating |
| AllMusic | 3.5/5 stars |
| Clash | 8/10 |
| DIY | 4/5 stars |
| Dork | 5/5 stars |
| i | 3/5 stars |
| The Line of Best Fit | 7/10 |
| NME | 4/5 stars |
| Pitchfork | 6.2/10 |

Upon its release, Good Riddance received generally positive reviews from music critics. At Metacritic, which assigns a normalized rating out of 100 to reviews from mainstream publications, the album received a weighted average score of 73 based on six reviews. The aggregator AnyDecentMusic? gave it 7.3 out of 10, based on their assessment of the critical consensus. Writing for Dork, Martyn Young felt the album had "incredible depth" and "possesses an atmosphere and charm all of its own", calling it an "emotional rollercoaster". The Line of Best Fit's Amaya Lim said the album "verges on greatness" and called it "an incredibly honest portrayal of guilt, doubt, and heartbreak".

Numerous reviewers singled out Abrams's songwriting for praise. Young called it "a masterclass in intimate and evocative songwriting" and "very special". Mylrea wrote that Abrams "has a knack" for it and that it makes her music shine. She also said "the lyrics often spill like water" due to Abrams's exposing a vulnerable side of herself. Clash's Isabella Miller thought that "there's much to be said of [Abrams's] lyricism" and commented on how Abrams has a "talent for penning lyrics that resonate with the heartbroken". The i's Kate Solomon said it twists expectations and compared her lyricism to that of Bridgers and Swift. For The Dartmouth, Elle Muller called it "exceptionally well done" and thought that with each listen, "new beautiful lyrics jump out". Of the South China Morning Post, Chinny Kwok wrote that Abrams's lyrics "exceed expectations and prove she is a profound songwriter". Writing for The Eastern Echo, Caitlin Michael said that they "are heavy but worth it". Some reviewers were more critical towards Abrams's lyricism. Pitchfork's Jane Bua thought it was cliché. Lim thought it was "both hyperspecific and extremely vague" and felt that the situations and characters presented in the tracks lacked essential context. Kate E. Ravenscroft of The Harvard Crimson called it stereotypical.

Critics had mixed opinions regarding Dessner's production. Muller wished that Abrams pushed it further and thought it needed more variety. Bua called it unadventurous and thought it made the record feel stagnant. Ravenscroft called it predictable and generic, writing, "the listener is almost sure to be greeted by a synth beat or an acoustic guitar". Mylrea highlighted Dessner's distinctive touch on the tracks and thought that his production added a new depth to Abrams's sound. Young called it sympathetic. Solomon described it as low-key. Lim opined that Dessner's contribution illuminated "an especially delicate side of Abrams's confessional songwriting".

=== Year-end lists ===
Good Riddance was considered one of the best albums of the year by several publications. The Spokesman-Review considered it the tenth best album of the year. Sophia McFarland called it "deeply introspective", and praised its songwriting, production, and Abrams's singing. Esquire ranked it the 15th best, Bria McNeal wrote that it is "full of lyrical treats and whimsical earworms". Writing for The A.V. Club, who ranked it the 21st best, Gajjar called it a "promising, sublime first album". Dork ordered it the 22nd best, their writer said that it "is not merely an album", but that "it's an immersive experience". Dailey wrote that it "officially propelled Abrams into the mainstream" for Billboard, who ranked it the 24th best. Hot Press named it the 27th best. For Rolling Stone, who named it the 62nd best, Maya Georgi called it a "stunning debut", and wrote that "the way she can deliver seething lines in an angelic whisper sets her apart from her bedroom-pop peers". It also appeared in unranked lists from Shondaland, Uproxx, and the USC Annenberg Press. Billboard also considered "Where Do We Go Now?" as the 96th best song of the year, and Variety ranked "Amelie" the 35th best.

Select year-end rankings of Good Riddance
| Publication | List | Rank | Ref. |
|---|---|---|---|
| The A.V. Club | The 27 Best Albums of 2023 | 21 | |
| Billboard | The 50 Best Albums of 2023 | 24 | |
| Dork | Top 50 Albums of 2023 | 22 | |
| Esquire | The 20 Best Albums of 2023 | 15 | |
| Hot Press | 50 Best Albums of 2023 | 27 | |
| Rolling Stone | The 100 Best Albums of 2023 | 62 | |
| The Spokesman-Review | Best Albums of 2023 | 10 | |

== Track listing ==
All tracks are written by Gracie Abrams and Aaron Dessner, additional writers listed where applicable.

Standard edition track listing
| No. | Title | Length |
|---|---|---|
| 1. | "Best" | 3:53 |
| 2. | "I Know It Won't Work" | 4:05 |
| 3. | "Full Machine" | 4:15 |
| 4. | "Where Do We Go Now?" | 4:04 |
| 5. | "I Should Hate You" | 4:18 |
| 6. | "Will You Cry?" | 3:50 |
| 7. | "Amelie" | 4:19 |
| 8. | "Difficult" | 4:18 |
| 9. | "This Is What the Drugs Are For" | 4:05 |
| 10. | "Fault Line" | 4:27 |
| 11. | "The Blue" | 5:00 |
| 12. | "Right Now" (Brian Eno) | 5:50 |
| Total length: | | 52:24 |

Deluxe edition bonus tracks
| No. | Title | Length |
|---|---|---|
| 13. | "Block Me Out" | 4:09 |
| 14. | "Unsteady" | 4:11 |
| 15. | "405" | 3:02 |
| 16. | "Two People" (Delacey) | 4:13 |
| Total length: | | 67:59 |

== Personnel ==
Credits adapted from Tidal.

=== Musicians ===
- Gracie Abrams – lead vocals (all tracks), Wurlitzer electric piano (10)
- Aaron Dessner – acoustic guitar (1, 6–10, 13), baritone guitar (11), bass (3, 5, 6, 8–10, 12, 13, 15), cymbals (1), drum programming (2, 4–6, 11–16), electric bass (1), electric guitar (1–5, 8, 9, 11, 13–16), guitar (1, 5, 9, 10, 14–16), Mellotron (1, 2, 6, 11, 14), ophicleide (4), percussion (1, 4–6), piano (1, 2, 4, 8, 9, 11, 12, 16), shaker (3, 10), synth bass (1, 2, 4, 6, 11, 14, 16), synthesizer (1–6, 8–12, 14–16), tambourine (1), Wurlitzer electric piano (2, 3, 9, 10, 12)
- Jonathan Low – synth bass (8)
- James McAlister – drums (4–7, 9, 14–16), drum programming (8), electric guitar (2, 3, 5), guitar (5), keyboards (1–5, 9, 14, 16), maracas (9, 14), Moog bass (2, 5–7, 9, 10, 14), percussion (8, 11, 12), piano (7), shaker (6, 16), synth bass (15), synthesizer (2–14, 16), tambourine (3, 9), tom-toms (16), woodwinds (16)
- Rob Moose – orchestration (4), piano (4), strings (13), viola (4, 11, 14), violin (4, 11, 14)
- Thomas Bartlett – piano (1–12, 16), synthesizer (1–12, 16), Mellotron (1–6, 8, 11), keyboards (1), ophicleide (8, 14) Wurlitzer electric piano (1–5, 7, 8, 11)
- Ben Lanz – synthesizer (1, 4–6, 8, 11, 12, 15, 16), trombone (16)
- Matt Barrick – drums (1, 3, 9, 13, 14) percussion (2, 3, 9), tambourine (13)
- James Krivchenia – drums (2, 3, 5, 14), percussion (5)
- Bryce Dessner – electric guitar (2, 3)
- Bryan Devendorf – drums (8)

=== Technical ===
- Aaron Dessner – production, engineering
- Randy Merrill – mastering (1–12, 14–16)
- Steve Fallone – mastering (13)
- Jonathan Low – mixing (all tracks), engineering (1–12, 14–16)
- Bella Blasko – engineering (1–7, 9–12)
- James McAlister – engineering (1–3, 5, 7, 9, 10, 15)
- Thomas Bartlett – engineering (1–3, 5, 7, 9, 10, 15)
- Ben Lanz – engineering (1, 5, 15)
- Matt Barrick – engineering (13)
- Rob Moose – engineering (13)
- Matias Tellez – additional production (2, 4)
- Mick Raskin – vocal engineering (8)

== Charts ==
=== Weekly charts ===
Weekly chart performance for Good Riddance
| Chart (2023–2024) | Peak position |
|---|---|
| Australian Albums (ARIA) | 30 |
| Austrian Albums (Ö3 Austria) | 63 |
| Belgian Albums (Ultratop Flanders) | 41 |
| Canadian Albums (Billboard) | 55 |
| Croatian International Albums (HDU) | 29 |
| French Albums (SNEP) | 113 |
| German Albums (Offizielle Top 100) | 19 |
| Irish Albums (Official Charts) | 4 |
| New Zealand Albums (RMNZ) | 40 |
| Scottish Albums (Official Charts) | 3 |
| Spanish Albums (Promusicae) | 55 |
| Swiss Albums (Schweizer Hitparade) | 92 |
| UK Albums (Official Charts) | 3 |
| US Billboard 200 | 52 |
| US Top Rock & Alternative Albums (Billboard) | 10 |

=== Year-end charts ===
Year-end chart performance for Good Riddance
| Chart | Year | Position |
|---|---|---|
| UK Cassette Albums (OCC) | 2023 | 15 |
| Belgian Albums (Ultratop Flanders) | 2025 | 171 |

== Certifications ==
Certifications for Good Riddance
| Region | Certification | Certified units/sales |
|---|---|---|
| Canada (Music Canada) | Gold | 40,000^{‡} |
| United Kingdom (BPI) | Gold | 100,000^{‡} |
^{‡} Sales+streaming figures based on certification alone.

== Release history ==
Release dates and formats for Good Riddance
| Region | Date | Format(s) | Edition | Label | Ref. |
|---|---|---|---|---|---|
| Various | February 24, 2023 | CD; digital download; streaming | Standard | Interscope | |
| Various | June 16, 2023 | LP; CD; digital download; streaming | Deluxe | Interscope | |
