= Columbiahalle =

Concert venue in Berlin, Germany

- C-Halle
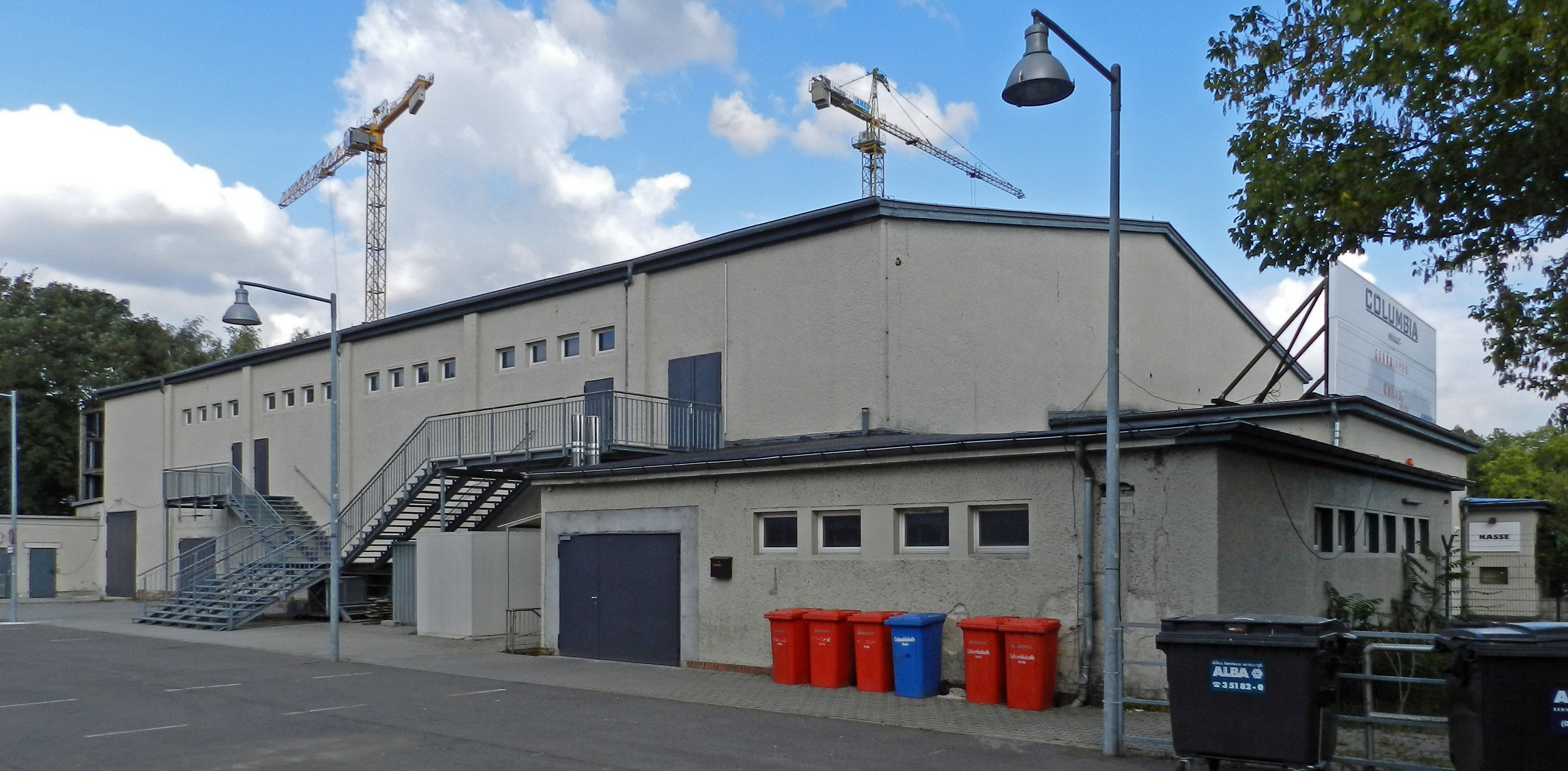
- Columbiahalle (side view)
- Interactive map of Columbiahalle
- Full name: Columbiahalle
- Address: Columbiadamm 13-21; Berlin; Germany
- Location: Berlin-Tempelhof
- Coordinates: 52.48465°N 13.39221°E
- Capacity: 3,500 (standing), 1,400 (seated)
- Type: concert venue
- Events: pop, rock
- Field size: 1150 m²

Construction
- Built: 1951
- Opened: 1998
- Renovated: 2014

Website
- www.columbiahalle.berlin

Columbiahalle is a concert venue in the Tempelhof district of Berlin. Built in 1951 as a sports hall for US soldiers, it opened as a venue in 1998. It should not be confused with Columbia Theater, a former cinema on the same site, also opened in 1951 for US soldiers, which is also now a music venue.

== History ==
Columbiahalle is located opposite the former Berlin Tempelhof Airport, which from 1945, following the end of the Second World War, had been used by the US Army as part of the American occupation sector of West Berlin. Columbiahalle was built in 1951 as a sports hall for the soldiers stationed in the city. After the US withdrawal in 1994, the building was closed and reopened after renovation in 1998. A comprehensive renovation took place in 2014.

== Events ==
The venue hosts mainly rock and pop music events. It has hosted many major artists including 50 Cent, AC/DC, Aespa, Alice Cooper, Coldplay, Eminem, Muse, My Chemical Romance, Placebo, Rammstein, Red Hot Chili Peppers, Rihanna, Robyn, Slayer, System of a Down, Weezer, and Jack White.

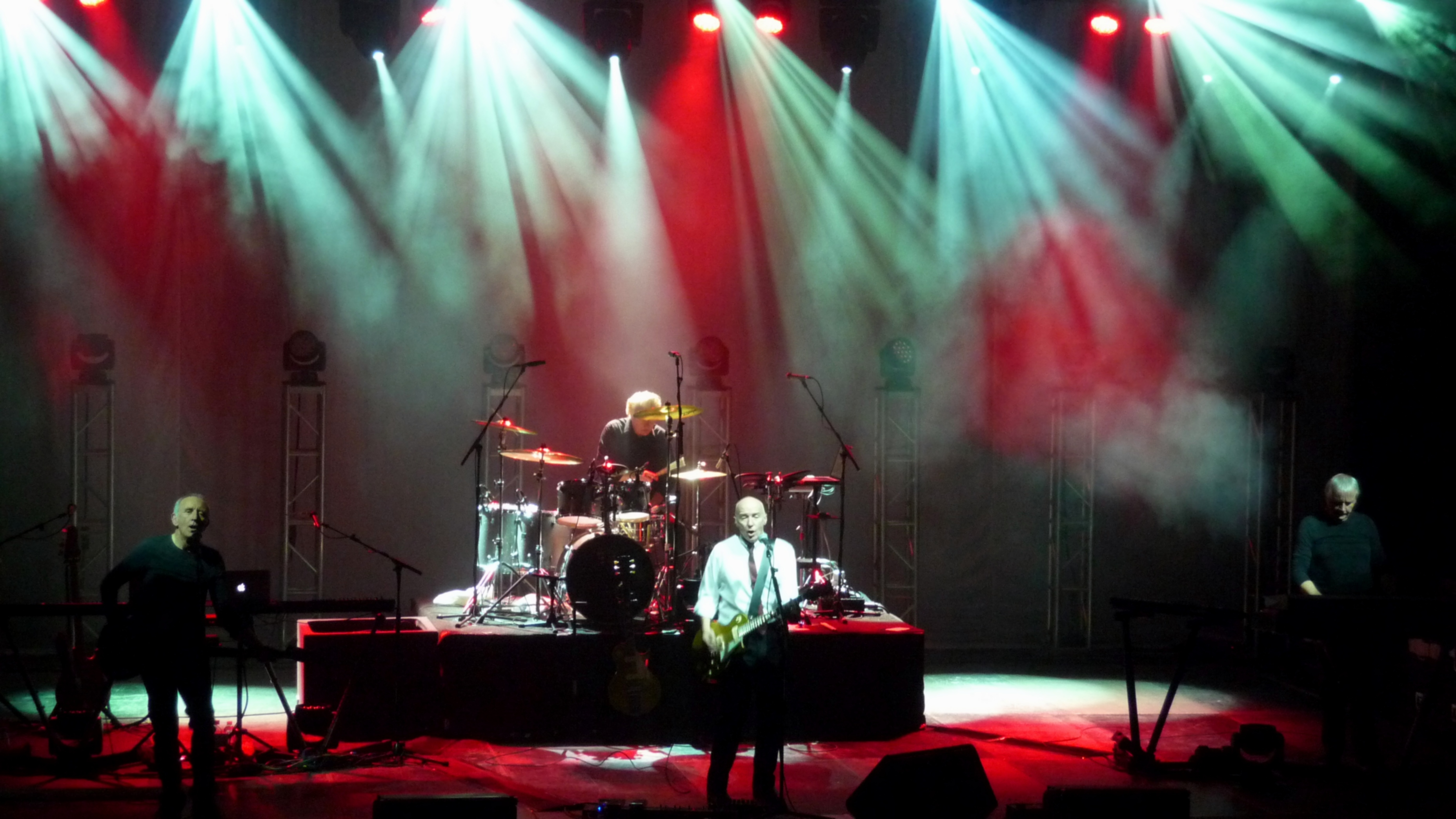
Ultravox at Columbiahalle in 2012

It can also be hired for conferences and sporting events.

== Technical data ==
The hall has a capacity of 3,500 standing and 1,400 seated. It is 8 metres high and has an area of 1150 m^{2}.

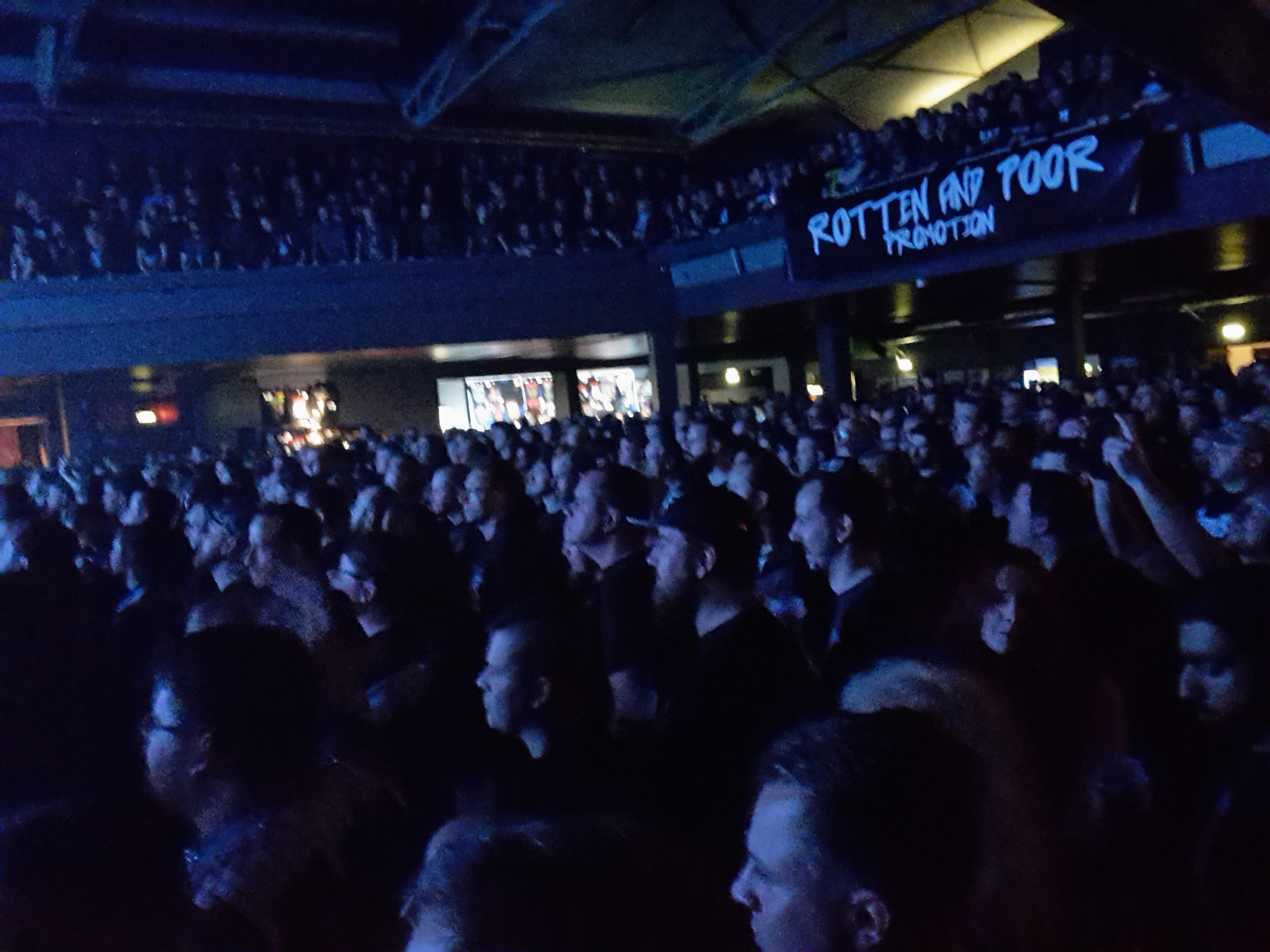
Audience at Columbiahalle
