= Searows =

American singer-songwriter (born 2000)

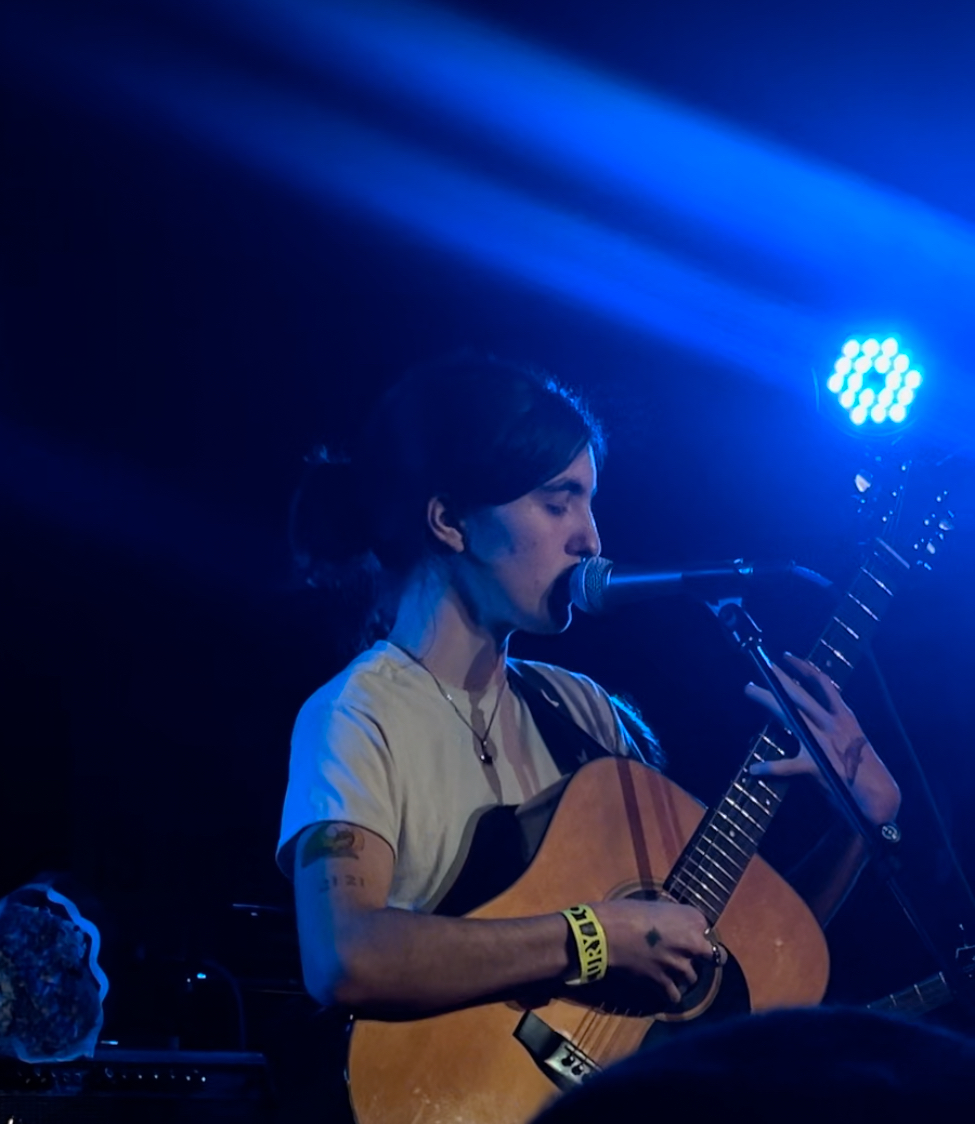
- Searows performing in New York City in January 2024

Background information
- Born: March 2, 2000 (age 26); Lexington, Kentucky, United States
- Genres: Indie folk; bedroom pop
- Occupations: Singer, songwriter
- Instruments: Vocals, guitar
- Works: Discography
- Years active: 2020–present
- Label: Last Recordings On Earth
- Website: searows.com

Alec Duckart (born March 2, 2000), known professionally as Searows, is an American singer and songwriter. Born in Lexington, Kentucky, and raised in Portland, Oregon, he has released two studio albums, Guard Dog (2022) and Death in the Business of Whaling (2026).

== Early life ==
Duckart was born in Lexington, Kentucky, but was raised in Portland, Oregon, where he currently resides. Growing up in Portland, his parents played for him artists including "Sufjan Stevens, Bon Iver, Iron & Wine, the Decemberists and people who also write about Oregon and the Pacific Northwest." He gained an appreciation for the "melancholic pleasure" of sad music at age nine.

He has been playing guitar since he was in the 7th grade, at around age 11 or 12. During this time, he began posting his songs to SoundCloud. He said that learning songs from the Juno soundtrack inspired him to learn numerous songs of his favorite musicians, before pursuing his own songwriting in earnest beginning in high school.

Briefly stepping away from music during the early COVID-19 pandemic period, Duckart returned to playing the guitar, during which he began posting videos to TikTok, where he gained a notable audience. Many TikTok users asked Duckart for a full version of an excerpt of "House Song," which gained 14 million streams in under 10 months.

== Musical career ==
=== 2020–2021: Beginnings and writing Guard Dog ===
Duckart first used the stage name "Searows" in a performance at the Museum of Pop Culture in Seattle, Washington, on January 30, 2020. In mid-July of that year, Duckart performed at the Timber! outdoor musical festival.

Duckart did not specify when he began working on his debut album, Guard Dog, except to say he had worked on it "for so long" that he had a "completely different perspective on a lot of the experiences" and would have likely "probably would've made a different album" upon its release.

=== 2022–2023: Guard Dog release and End of the World ===
He described his lyric writing process for Guard Dog as beginning with building chords before testing vocal melodies in voice memos, often drawing from poems of journal entries. Guard Dog was first announced on August 4, 2022, on Duckart's Instagram before being self-released on September 30, 2022. Duckart wrote, produced, recorded, and mixed the album himself using GarageBand. The album received significant success and positive reception thanks, in part, to his TikTok following. These praises included artists like Ethel Cain and Gracie Abrams.

While touring with Abrams on her 2023 Good Riddance Tour, 2023 Duckart was the first artist signed to Matt Maltese's newly founded record label, Last Recordings On Earth. He said he did not expect to be signed by Maltese following their tour together one year prior, but speculated it was because of the similar "bleakness" in their styles.

Although hesitant to return to the same emotions as when he wrote Guard Dog, Duckart said it is "human nature" to write about the same feelings as they "don't go away." This is what Duckart says leads him to utilize repetition in his works. Duckart released several singles in advance of the release of his first EP, End Of The World. "Older" was the first, being released on July 25, 2023. Duckart described that he did not know what the song was about until after completing it, believing it to discuss powerlessness while growing older. Duckart faced writer's block before completing "I have more than enough," but following a long walk in Portland, he wrote, recorded, and produced the entire song in the city before ultimately releasing the single on September 12. The single "Funny" was released shortly after, on October 17. The 6-track EP End Of The World was released on November 10 of the same year. A music video for the title track was released a month later, on December 10, 2023.

=== 2024–present: flush and Death in the Business of Whaling ===
On March 19, 2024, Duckart announced that he would be going on his first headline tour around the United States between June 12 and 30, 2024. On the heels of his first tour, having selling tickets for his second, and returning from a year long release hiatus, Duckart released the single "martingale" on August 21. Days after the release, between August 28 and September 21, 2024, Duckart headlined his second tour in venues around Europe and the United Kingdom. Shortly following the end of the tour, on September 25, 2024, Duckart released "toothache," which Duckart said described the experience of letting go "the need to make other people feel comfortable at the cost of your own dignity and personhood." His second EP, flush, which featured both singles, was released on November 11, 2024, produced by Jonathan Pearce.

On May 30, 2025, Duckart announced on Instagram that he had finished recording his second album. Death in the Business of Whaling was recorded in a horse barn outside of Seattle with producer Trevor Spencer . During the recording process, Duckart was listening to a lot of Alex G, drawing inspiration from his instrumentation using the banjo and "heavy guitars." On October 2, Duckart released the single "Dearly Missed," including a music video, and announced his sophomore album, Death in the Business of Whaling. Duckart said that "Dearly Missed" was his contribution to the "good for her" horror genre, speaking particularly to society's alienation of marginalized groups, including Duckart. Between October 14 and 31, Duckart supported Tamino on his Every Dawn's a Mountain Tour. The album's second single "Photograph of a Cyclone" was released alongside a music video on November 12. Duckart released the album's third single, "Dirt," on January 7, 2026, alongside a black and white music video directed by Karlee Boon and Marlowe Ostara. Duckart said the song was "about [the] inevitability" of life being "finite," which inspired the song's title, "Dirt," to which "we all inevitably return." On January 13, Duckart announced his second headlining North American tour, which is planned to last from April 23 to June 27. Less than a week before the release of the album, Duckart released the fourth single "In Violet" on January 19. Death in the Business of Whaling was then released on January 23, which Duckart celebrated with in-store record shows between January 23 and 29. The album's name hails from Herman Melville's Moby Dick, which further inspired the cover, track names, and instrumentation on the album. Duckart said the album deals with "more broad" and abstract themes than his older music, which was more of a "literal diary entry of my own thoughts." He engages with these concepts through heavy use of the second person in the lyrics, much like the songwriting of Fiona Apple and Sufjan Stevens.

== Artistry ==
=== Influences ===
Duckart accredits his upbringing in the Pacific Northwest to the influences on his style. He described being consistently drawn to "the saddest music" for their emotional complexity and cathartic property; Duckart expressed seeking to recreate this in his music.

Early in Duckart's career, he drew inspiration from Phoebe Bridgers and boygenius, of which Bridgers is a member. He was drawn to their bare instrumentation. Later in his career, Duckart listed Ethel Cain as a growing influence on his music, particularly treasuring her 2022 studio album, Preacher's Daughter.

=== Musical style ===
Duckart has described his sounds as "stereotypically Pacific Northwest," saying that "it's very much influenced me a lot and it's just great. I love Oregon. It's beautiful." This description has been echoed by critics.

Duckart's musical style has been likened to Phoebe Bridgers, Phil Elverum, and Ethel Cain.

== Personal life ==
Duckart has described himself as "very perfectionist", which he said is sometimes his "downfall," especially in the vocal and mixing processes.

== Discography ==
Searows discography
- Studio albums: 2
- EPs: 2
- Singles: 13
- Music videos: 5

=== Studio albums ===
Title	Details
Guard Dog	Released: September 30, 2022; Label: self-released; Formats: CD, digital download, streaming
Death in the Business of Whaling	Released: January 23, 2026; Label: Last Recordings On Earth; Formats: CD, vinyl, digital download, streaming

=== Extended plays ===
Title	Details
End of the World	Released: February 16, 2024; Label: Last Recordings On Earth; Formats: vinyl, digital download, streaming
flush	Released: November 24, 2024; Label: Last Recordings On Earth; Formats: vinyl, digital download, streaming

=== Singles ===
==== As lead artist ====
Title	Year	Album/EP
"Used to Be Friends"	2022	Guard Dog
"Walk Me Home"	2022	Guard Dog
"House Song"	2023	Non-album/EP single
"Older"	2023	End of the World
"I have more than enough"	2023	End of the World
"Funny"	2023	End of the World
"martingale"	2024	flush
"toothache"	2024	flush
"Only Time (demo)"	2024	"Non-album/EP single"
"Dearly Missed"	2025	Death in the Business of Whaling
"Photograph of a Cyclone"	2025	Death in the Business of Whaling
"Dirt"	2026	Death in the Business of Whaling
"In Violet"	2026	Death in the Business of Whaling
"Hunter"	2026	Death in the Business of Whaling

==== As featured or collaborative artist ====
Title	Year	Album
"Philadelphia" (Matt Maltese with Searows)	2023	Songs That Aren't Mine
"Poor Madeline (Alternative Version)" (Daffo featuring Searows)	2024	Non-album single

=== Music videos ===
Title	Year	Director/Producer
"Older"	2023	Alec Duckart
"End of the World"	2023	Karlee Boon and Marlowe Ostara
"Dearly Missed"	2025	Karlee Boon
"Photograph of a Cyclone"	2025	Marlowe Ostara
"Dirt"	2026	Karlee Boom and Marlow Ostara

== Tours ==
=== Headlining acts ===
- Searows EU & UK Tour (2024)
- Searows US Tour (2024)
- Searows London & Paris (2024)
- Searows NA Tour (2026)

=== Support acts ===
- EU + US Autumn Tour – Matt Maltese (2022)
- The First Ever Leith Ross Tour (2023)
- Good Riddance Tour – Gracie Abrams (2023)
- Blood Stained Blonde Tour – Ethel Cain (2023)
- Every Dawn's a Mountain Tour – Tamino (2025)
- The Over Country Tour – Lizzy McAlpine (2027)
