= Noah Kahan discography =

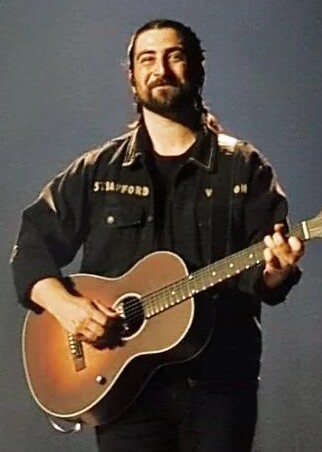
- Kahan in 2024
- Studio albums: 4
- EPs: 2
- Live albums: 1
- Singles: 25

American singer-songwriter Noah Kahan has released four studio albums, one live album, two extended plays and twenty-five singles. Kahan is signed to Republic Records, through which he has released all his material.

Kahan released his debut EP Hurt Somebody in 2018, and the following year released his debut album Busyhead. His single "Hurt Somebody" featuring Julia Michaels appeared at number 24 on the US Hot Rock & Alternative Songs chart, making his first appearance on any American chart.

Kahan released his second EP Cape Elizabeth in 2020 during the COVID-19 lockdowns; Kahan followed this with the release of his second album, I Was / I Am, in 2021. The album peaked at 154 on the Billboard 200.

In 2022, Kahan released his breakthrough third studio album Stick Season, which peaked at number two on the Billboard 200. The title track of the album, "Stick Season", helped launch him into mainstream popularity. The song peaked at number nine on the Billboard Hot 100 and led to his first Grammy nomination. The album received a deluxe edition, Stick Season (We'll All Be Here Forever), in 2023. More material was released in 2024 with another deluxe edition titled Stick Season (Forever). In 2024, Kahan announced a live album, Live from Fenway Park, would be released on August 30.

== Albums ==
=== Studio albums ===
List of studio albums, with selected chart positions
Title	Album details	Peak chart positions										Certifications
Title	Album details	US	AUS	BEL (FL)	CAN	IRE	NLD	NOR	NZ	SCO	UK	Certifications
Busyhead	Released: June 14, 2019; Label: Republic; Format: CD, LP, digital download, streaming	— (Note: Busyhead did not enter the US Billboard 200, but peaked at number one on the US Heatseekers Albums Chart.)	— (Note: Busyhead did not enter the Australian ARIA Albums Chart but peaked at number 10 on the ARIA Hitseekers Chart.)	—	83	—	—	—	—	—	—	RIAA: Gold; BPI: Gold; MC: Gold
I Was / I Am	Released: September 17, 2021; Label: Republic; Format: CD, digital download, streaming	154	—	—	—	—	59	—	—	15	70	
Stick Season (Note: Stick Season was reissued in June 2023 as Stick Season (We'll All Be Here Forever) with bonus material, and another reissue with more bonus material was released in February 2024 as Stick Season (Forever); chart positions and sales figures are cumulative for all releases.)	Released: October 14, 2022; Label: Mercury, Republic; Format: CD, LP, digital download, streaming	2	6	7	1	1	1	18	5	2	1	RIAA: 5× Platinum; ARIA: Gold; BPI: 2× Platinum; MC: 7× Platinum; NVPI: Gold; RMNZ: 5× Platinum
The Great Divide	Released: April 24, 2026; Label: Mercury; Format: CD, digital download, streaming	1	1	3	1	1	1	6	1	1	1	RIAA: Platinum; BPI: Gold; MC: 2× Platinum; RMNZ: Platinum
"—" denotes a recording that did not chart or was not released in that territory.

=== Live albums ===
List of live albums, with selected details
Title	Album details	Peak chart positions							
Title	Album details	US	BEL	CAN	IRE	NLD Vinyl	SCO	SPA Vinyl	UK Sales
Live from Fenway Park	Released: August 30, 2024; Label: Mercury, Republic; Format: LP, digital download, streaming	37	188	89	72	6	18	71	26

== Extended plays ==
List of extended plays, with selected chart positions
Title	EP details	Peak chart positions		
Title	EP details	US Heat.	BEL	NLD
Hurt Somebody	Released: January 12, 2018; Format: Digital download, streaming; Label: Republic	22	—	—
Cape Elizabeth	Released: May 1, 2020; Format: Digital download, streaming, LP; Label: Republic	—	72	47
"—" denotes a recording that did not chart or was not released in that territory.

== Singles ==
=== As lead artist ===
Title	Year	Peak chart positions										Certifications	Album
Title	Year	US	US Rock	AUS	CAN	IRE	NLD	NZ	SWE	UK	WW	Certifications	Album
"Young Blood"	2017	—	—	—	—	—	—	—	—	—	—	ARIA: Platinum; MC: Platinum; RMNZ: Gold	Busyhead
"Hold It Down"	2017	—	—	—	—	—	—	—	—	—	—		Non-album single
"Sink"	2017	—	—	—	—	—	—	—	—	—	—	ARIA: Gold	Busyhead
"Hallelujah"	2017	—	—	—	—	—	—	—	—	—	—		Non-album singles
"Fine"	2017	—	—	—	—	—	—	—	—	—	—		Non-album singles
"Hurt Somebody" (solo or with Julia Michaels)	2017	—	24	14	—	—	33	29	88	—	—	RIAA: Gold; ARIA: 6× Platinum; BPI: Gold; GLF: Gold; MC: Gold; RMNZ: 3× Platinum	Hurt Somebody and Busyhead
"Come Down"	2018	—	—	—	—	—	—	—	—	—	—		Non-album single
"False Confidence"	2018	—	— (Note: "False Confidence" did not enter the Hot Rock & Alternative Songs chart, but peaked at number eight on the Adult Alternative Airplay chart.)	—	—	—	—	—	—	—	—	RIAA: Gold; ARIA: Platinum; BPI: Gold; MC: Platinum; RMNZ: Platinum	Busyhead
"Mess"	2019	—	— (Note: "Mess" did not enter the Hot Rock & Alternative Songs chart, but peaked at number 26 on the Adult Alternative Airplay chart.)	—	—	—	—	— (Note: "Mess" did not enter the NZ Top 40 Singles Chart, but peaked at number 33 on the NZ Hot Singles Chart.)	—	—	—	ARIA: Platinum; BPI: Silver	Busyhead
"Cynic"	2019	—	— (Note: "Cynic" did not enter the Hot Rock & Alternative Songs chart, but peaked at number 30 on the Adult Alternative Airplay chart.)	—	—	—	—	—	—	—	—		Busyhead
"Busyhead"	2019	—	—	—	—	—	—	—	—	—	—		Busyhead
"Crazier Things" (with Chelsea Cutler)	2020	—	—	—	—	—	—	—	—	—	—		Non-album singles
"Pride" (featuring mxmtoon)	2020	—	—	—	—	—	—	—	—	—	—		Non-album singles
"Godlight"	2021	—	—	—	—	—	—	—	—	—	—		I Was / I Am
"Animal"	2021	—	—	—	—	—	—	—	—	—	—		I Was / I Am
"Someone Like You" (featuring Joy Oladokun)	2021	—	—	—	—	—	—	—	—	—	—		I Was / I Am
"Stick Season"	2022	9	2	1	3	1	1	2	15	1	5	RIAA: 8× Platinum; ARIA: 11× Platinum; BPI: 6× Platinum; MC: 8× Platinum; NVPI: Platinum; RMNZ: 6× Platinum	Stick Season
"Northern Attitude" (solo or with Hozier)	2022	37	7	63	21	5	— (Note: "Northern Attitude" did not enter the Dutch Single Top 100, but peaked at number 11 on the Single Tip chart.)	39	—	16	55	RIAA: 3× Platinum; ARIA: 3× Platinum; BPI: Platinum; MC: 3× Platinum; RMNZ: 2× Platinum	Stick Season
"We're All Gonna Die" (with Joy Oladokun)	2023	—	— (Note: "We're All Gonna Die" did not enter the Hot Rock & Alternative Songs chart, but peaked at number 46 on the Rock & Alternative Airplay chart.)	—	—	—	—	—	—	—	—		Proof of Life
"Dial Drunk" (solo or with Post Malone)	2023	25	3	45	10	11	— (Note: "Dial Drunk" did not enter the Dutch Single Top 100, but peaked at number nine on the Single Tip chart.)	26	—	32	39	RIAA: 4× Platinum; ARIA: 4× Platinum; BPI: Platinum; MC: 5× Platinum; RMNZ: Platinum	Stick Season
"Call Your Mom" (solo or with Lizzy McAlpine)	2023	— (Note: "Call Your Mom" did not enter the Billboard Hot 100, but peaked at number five on the Bubbling Under Hot 100 chart.)	9	—	68	32	—	— (Note: "Call Your Mom" did not enter the NZ Top 40 Singles Chart, but peaked at number five on the NZ Hot Singles Chart.)	—	83	—	RIAA: Gold; ARIA: 2× Platinum; BPI: Platinum; MC: Platinum; RMNZ: Gold	Stick Season
"She Calls Me Back" (solo or with Kacey Musgraves)	2023	76	10	—	62	38	—	— (Note: "She Calls Me Back" did not enter the NZ Top 40 Singles Chart, but peaked at number 12 on the NZ Hot Singles Chart.)	—	95	—	RIAA: 2× Platinum; ARIA: Platinum; BPI: Silver; MC: 2× Platinum; RMNZ: Platinum	Stick Season
"Everywhere, Everything" (solo or with Gracie Abrams)	2023	79	9	—	60	21	—	— (Note: "Everywhere, Everything" did not enter the NZ Top 40 Singles Chart, but peaked at number six on the NZ Hot Singles Chart.)	—	72	—	RIAA: 2× Platinum; ARIA: Platinum; BPI: Platinum; MC: Platinum; RMNZ: Gold	Stick Season
"Homesick" (solo or with Sam Fender)	2024	— (Note: "Homesick" did not enter the Billboard Hot 100, but peaked at number 20 on the Bubbling Under Hot 100 chart.)	18	57	64	4	— (Note: "Homesick" did not enter the Dutch Single Top 100, but peaked at number 16 on the Single Tip chart.)	— (Note: "Homesick" did not enter the NZ Top 40 Singles Chart, but peaked at number four on the NZ Hot Singles Chart.)	— (Note: "Homesick" did not enter the Swedish Singellista Chart, but peaked at number 19 on the Swedish Heatseeker Chart.)	5	—	RIAA: Platinum; ARIA: Platinum; BPI: Platinum; MC: 2× Platinum; RMNZ: Platinum	Stick Season
"Forever"	2024	28	4	98	16	43	—	— (Note: "Forever" did not enter the NZ Top 40 Singles Chart, but peaked at number six on the NZ Hot Singles Chart.)	— (Note: "Forever" did not enter the Swedish Singellista Chart, but peaked at number 15 on the Swedish Heatseeker Chart.)	31	53	RIAA: Platinum; ARIA: Gold; BPI: Silver; MC: Platinum	Stick Season
"Cowboys Cry Too" (with Kelsea Ballerini)	2024	50	—	—	49	77	—	— (Note: "Cowboys Cry Too" did not enter the NZ Top 40 Singles Chart, but peaked at number seven on the NZ Hot Singles Chart.)	—	84	173	RIAA: Gold; MC: Gold	Patterns
"Up All Night" (with James Bay and the Lumineers)	2024	—	28	—	—	—	—	— (Note: "Up All Night" did not enter the NZ Top 40 Singles Chart, but peaked at number six on the NZ Hot Singles Chart.)	—	— (Note: "Up All Night" did not enter the UK Singles Chart, but peaked at number 99 on the UK Singles Sales Chart.)	—		Changes All the Time
"The Great Divide"	2026	6	1	15	2	1	86	13	64	10	10	BPI: Gold; MC: 2× Platinum; RMNZ: Gold	The Great Divide
"Porch Light"	2026	20	4	27	10	8	83	21	— (Note: "Porch Light" did not enter the Swedish Singellista Chart, but peaked at number 2 on the Swedish Heatseeker Chart.)	19	31	MC: Platinum; RMNZ: Gold	The Great Divide
"Doors"	2026	9	1	16	2	3	76	9	85	12	13	BPI: Silver; MC: Platinum; RMNZ: Gold	The Great Divide
"Orbiter"	2026	33	6	23	27	8	—	21	— (Note: "Orbiter" did not enter the Swedish Singellista Chart, but peaked at number 6 on the Swedish Heatseeker Chart.)	13	71	BPI: Silver; MC: Platinum	The Great Divide
"Draw You Out"	2026	25	4	35	14	9	— (Note: "Draw You Out" did not enter the Dutch Single Top 100, but peaked at number 11 on the Single Tip chart.)	15	— (Note: "Draw You Out" did not enter the Swedish Singellista Chart, but peaked at number one on the Swedish Heatseeker Chart.)	16	40		The Hunger Games: Sunrise on the Reaping (The Album)
"—" denotes a recording that did not chart or was not released in that territory.

=== As featured artist ===
Title	Year	Album
"Heavenly Father" (Gryffin featuring Noah Kahan)	2020	Non-album single

== Other charted and certified songs ==
Title	Year	Peak chart positions										Certifications	Album
Title	Year	US	US Rock	AUS	CAN	IRE	NOR	NZ	SWE Heat.	UK	WW	Certifications	Album
"Glue Myself Shut"	2020	—	—	—	—	—	—	—	—	—	—	ARIA: Gold	Cape Elizabeth
"Maine"	2020	—	—	—	—	—	—	—	—	— (Note: "Maine" did not enter the UK Singles Chart, but peaked at number 24 on the UK Singles Sales Chart.)	—	RIAA: Platinum; ARIA: Platinum; BPI: Silver; RMNZ: Gold	Cape Elizabeth
"Part of Me"	2021	—	—	—	—	—	—	—	—	—	—	ARIA: Gold	I Was / I Am
"All My Love"	2022	— (Note: "All My Love" did not enter the Billboard Hot 100, but peaked at number 11 on the Bubbling Under Hot 100 chart.)	19	—	70	53	—	—	—	—	—	RIAA: 2× Platinum; ARIA: Platinum; BPI: Gold; MC: 2× Platinum; RMNZ: Gold	Stick Season
"Come Over"	2022	—	45	—	—	—	—	—	—	—	—	RIAA: Gold; MC: Gold	Stick Season
"New Perspective"	2022	—	36	—	—	—	—	—	—	—	—	RIAA: Platinum; ARIA: Gold; BPI: Silver; MC: Platinum	Stick Season
"Orange Juice"	2022	—	30	—	—	41	—	—	—	—	—	RIAA: Gold; ARIA: Platinum; BPI: Gold; MC: 4× Platinum; RMNZ: Platinum	Stick Season
"Strawberry Wine"	2022	—	48	—	—	—	—	—	—	—	—	RIAA: Platinum; MC: Platinum	Stick Season
"Growing Sideways"	2022	—	35	—	—	—	—	—	—	—	—	RIAA: Gold; ARIA: Gold; BPI: Silver; MC: Platinum	Stick Season
"Halloween"	2022	—	—	—	—	—	—	—	—	—	—	MC: Gold	Stick Season
"Still"	2022	—	—	—	—	—	—	—	—	—	—	MC: Gold	Stick Season
"The View Between Villages"	2022	— (Note: "The View Between Villages" did not enter the Billboard Hot 100, but peaked at number six on the Bubbling Under Hot 100 chart.)	10	—	84	100	—	—	—	—	—	RIAA: Platinum; ARIA: Platinum; BPI: Gold; MC: 2× Platinum; RMNZ: Platinum	Stick Season
"Your Needs, My Needs"	2023	—	19	—	—	—	—	—	—	—	—	RIAA: Gold; MC: Gold	Stick Season
"Paul Revere" (solo or with Gregory Alan Isakov)	2023	— (Note: "Paul Revere" did not enter the Billboard Hot 100, but peaked at number three on the Bubbling Under Hot 100 chart.)	13	—	77	—	—	— (Note: "Paul Revere" did not enter the NZ Top 40 Singles Chart, but peaked at number 18 on the NZ Hot Singles Chart.)	—	—	—	ARIA: Gold; BPI: Silver; MC: Gold	Stick Season
"No Complaints"	2023	— (Note: "No Complaints" did not enter the Billboard Hot 100, but peaked at number seven on the Bubbling Under Hot 100 chart.)	11	—	86	—	—	— (Note: "No Complaints" did not enter the NZ Top 40 Singles Chart, but peaked at number 10 on the NZ Hot Singles Chart.)	—	—	—	RIAA: Gold; MC: Gold	Stick Season
"You're Gonna Go Far" (solo or with Brandi Carlile)	2023	86	7	—	59	13	—	— (Note: "You're Gonna Go Far" did not enter the NZ Top 40 Singles Chart, but peaked at number 8 on the NZ Hot Singles Chart.)	—	60	—	RIAA: 2× Platinum; ARIA: 2× Platinum; BPI: Platinum; MC: 2× Platinum; RMNZ: Gold	Stick Season
"Sarah's Place" (Zach Bryan featuring Noah Kahan)	2023	14	2	—	13	28	—	— (Note: "Sarah's Place" did not enter the NZ Top 40 Singles Chart, but peaked at number 5 on the NZ Hot Singles Chart.)	—	—	41	RIAA: Platinum; BPI: Silver; MC: 3× Platinum; RMNZ: Gold	Boys of Faith
"Pain Is Cold Water" (live)	2024	— (Note: "Pain Is Cold Water" (live) did not enter the Billboard Hot 100, but peaked at number 23 on the Bubbling Under Hot 100 chart.)	21	—	—	—	—	— (Note: "Pain Is Cold Water" (live) did not enter the NZ Top 40 Singles Chart, but peaked at number 11 on the NZ Hot Singles Chart.)	—	—	—		Live from Fenway Park
"End of August"	2026	14	3	30	11	27	—	17	—	68	29	MC: Gold	The Great Divide
"American Cars"	2026	16	4	31	13	—	—	25	—	— (Note: "American Cars" did not enter the UK Singles Chart, but peaked at number 46 on the UK Streaming Chart.)	34	MC: Gold	The Great Divide
"Downfall"	2026	23	8	34	18	—	—	32	—	— (Note: "Downfall" did not enter the UK Singles Chart, but peaked at number 64 on the UK Streaming Chart.)	48	MC: Gold	The Great Divide
"Lighthouse"	2026	65	26	—	53	—	—	—	—	—	—		The Great Divide
"Paid Time Off"	2026	29	12	45	24	—	—	37	—	— (Note: "Paid Time Off" did not enter the UK Singles Chart, but peaked at number 83 on the UK Streaming Chart.)	65		The Great Divide
"Staying Still"	2026	44	14	49	32	—	—	—	—	— (Note: "Staying Still" did not enter the UK Singles Chart, but peaked at number 99 on the UK Singles Sales Chart.)	105	MC: Gold	The Great Divide
"Haircut"	2026	28	11	44	22	—	—	36	—	— (Note: "Haircut" did not enter the UK Singles Chart, but peaked at number 82 on the UK Streaming Chart.)	60	MC: Gold	The Great Divide
"Willing and Able"	2026	26	9	22	20	6	87	17	11	14	56	BPI: Silver; MC: Platinum; RMNZ: Gold	The Great Divide
"Dashboard"	2026	19	6	29	14	11	—	23	—	— (Note: "Dashboard" did not enter the UK Singles Chart, but peaked at number 44 on the UK Streaming Chart.)	37	MC: Gold	The Great Divide
"23"	2026	33	14	53	28	—	—	—	—	—	86	MC: Gold	The Great Divide
"Deny Deny Deny"	2026	34	15	49	27	—	—	38	—	— (Note: "Deny Deny Deny" did not enter the UK Singles Chart, but peaked at number 95 on the UK Streaming Chart.)	85	MC: Gold	The Great Divide
"Headed North"	2026	51	23	80	39	—	—	—	—	—	142		The Great Divide
"We Go Way Back"	2026	48	21	79	38	—	—	—	—	—	134		The Great Divide
"Spoiled"	2026	56	24	83	41	—	—	—	—	—	162		The Great Divide
"All Them Horses"	2026	45	19	64	35	—	—	—	—	—	115		The Great Divide
"A Few of Your Own"	2026	81	30	—	65	—	—	—	—	—	—		The Great Divide
"Dan"	2026	50	21	74	36	—	—	—	—	—	132	MC: Gold	The Great Divide
"—" denotes a recording that did not chart or was not released in that territory.
