= The Stick Season (We'll All Be Here Forever) Tour =

2024 concert tour by Noah Kahan

- Tour by Noah Kahan
- Location: Europe; North America; Oceania
- Associated album: Stick Season (We'll All Be Here Forever)
- Start date: January 17, 2024
- End date: September 29, 2024
- Legs: 5
- No. of shows: 85
- Supporting acts: James Bay; Ryan Beatty; Mt. Joy; Jensen McRae; Maisie Peters; Wild Rivers; Alessi Rose; John Vincent III

Noah Kahan concert chronology
- The Stick Season Tour (2022–2023); The Stick Season (We'll All Be Here Forever) Tour (2024); The Great Divide Tour (2026)

The Stick Season (We'll All Be Here Forever) Tour was the fourth concert tour by folk-pop singer-songwriter Noah Kahan. This tour follows his successful 2022–2023 tour for the release of his album Stick Season. The tour began on January 17 in Melbourne, Australia and concluded on September 11 in East Troy, United States.

== Background ==
On August 2, 2023, Kahan first announced he would be returning to the UK and Europe for a 11 show leg in February 2024. On September 20, 2023, he officially announced the tour in addition to a new North American leg including shows in the United States and Canada. On September 26, 2024, Kahan added seven additional North American shows to the tour due to increased demand including a second show at Boston's Fenway Park.

== Live recording ==
On August 21, 2024, Noah Kahan announced that he would be releasing a live recording titled Live from Fenway Park. The album was recorded from the pair of shows at Fenway Park.

== Opening acts ==
Several opening acts appeared throughout the tour, including James Bay, Ryan Beatty, Mt. Joy, Jensen McRae and John Vincent III at the North American dates. Wild Rivers opened for Noah Kahan on the first United Kingdom and European leg the tour. Dylan Gossett opened for the Oceania leg. Maisie Peters and Alessi Rose opened for the second leg of United Kingdom shows.

== Setlist ==
This is the average setlist throughout the tour. It is not meant to represent all shows throughout the tour.

1. "Dial Drunk"
2. "New Perspective"
3. "Everywhere, Everything"
4. "False Confidence"
5. "Forever"
6. "Come Over"
7. "Godlight"
8. "Pain Is Like Cold Water"
9. "Maine"
10. "All My Love"
11. "Your Needs, My Needs"
12. "Paul Revere"
13. "You're Gonna Go Far"
14. "Homesick"
15. "Growing Sideways"
16. "Glue Myself Shut"
17. "She Calls Me Back"
18. "Call Your Mom"
19. "Orange Juice"
20. "Northern Attitude"
21. "Young Blood"
22. "The View Between Villages"
23. "Stick Season"

=== Notes ===
- At the Brisbane show, "Stick Season" was performed with Griffin Morris.
- At the Dublin show, "Northern Attitude" was performed with Dermot Kennedy.
- At the April 6 show in Toronto, "Stick Season" was performed with Shawn Mendes.
- At the May 24 show in Nashville, "Stick Season" was performed with Jelly Roll.
- At the May 25 show in Nashville, "Stick Season" was performed with Kelsea Ballerini.
- At the June 21 show in Los Angeles, "Stick Season" was performed with Reneé Rapp.
- At the July 15 show in New York, "Stick Season" was performed with James Bay.
- At the July 16 show in New York, "Stick Season" was performed with Remi Wolf.
- At the July 18 show in Boston, "Everywhere, Everything" was performed with Gracie Abrams, Kahan and The Lumineers covered "If We Were Vampires" by Jason Isbell & the 400 Unit's, and brought out Abrams, The Lumineers, James Bay, and Mt. Joy for "Stick Season." "The Great Divide" was performed.
- At the July 19 show in Boston, Mt. Joy performed "Northern Attitude" with Kahan. "Mess" was performed, and his mother, father and other family members appeared on stage for "Stick Season."
- At the show in East Troy, Kahan covered "Fine Line" by Harry Styles.
- At the August 22 show in London, "Stick Season" was performed with Maisie Peters

== Tour dates ==
List of 2024 concerts
Date (2024)	City	Country	Venue	Opening Acts
January 17	Melbourne	Australia	Sidney Myer Music Bowl	Dylan Gossett
January 18	Melbourne	Australia	Sidney Myer Music Bowl	Dylan Gossett
January 20	Brisbane	Australia	Riverstage	Dylan Gossett
January 23	Sydney	Australia	Hordern Pavilion	Dylan Gossett
January 24	Sydney	Australia	Hordern Pavilion	Dylan Gossett
January 27	Perth	Australia	Red Hill Auditorium	Dylan Gossett
February 8	Dublin	Ireland	3Arena	Wild Rivers
February 10	Glasgow	Scotland	OVO Hydro	Wild Rivers
February 11	Leeds	England	First District Arena	Wild Rivers
February 13	Cardiff	Wales	Cardiff International Arena	Wild Rivers
February 14	Wembley	England	OVO Arena Wembley	Wild Rivers
February 15	Wembley	England	OVO Arena Wembley	Wild Rivers
February 17	Paris	France	L'Olympia	Wild Rivers
February 18	Cologne	Germany	Palladium	Wild Rivers
February 21	Berlin	Germany	Columbiahalle	Wild Rivers
February 23	Copenhagen	Denmark	K.B. Hallen	Wild Rivers
February 25	Amsterdam	Netherlands	AFAS Live	Wild Rivers
February 26	Brussels	Belgium	Forest National	Wild Rivers
March 2 (Note: This concert was part of Extra Innings Festival.)	Tempe	United States	Tempe Beach Park	—N/a
March 26	Vancouver	Canada	Rogers Arena	Jensen McRae
March 28	Calgary	Canada	Scotiabank Saddledome	Jensen McRae
March 29	Edmonton	Canada	Rogers Place	Jensen McRae
March 30	Saskatoon	Canada	SaskTel Centre	Jensen McRae
April 2	Winnipeg	Canada	Canada Life Centre	Jensen McRae
April 6	Toronto	Canada	Scotiabank Arena	Jensen McRae
April 9	Ottawa	Canada	Canadian Tire Centre	Jensen McRae
April 10	Quebec City	Canada	Videotron Centre	Jensen McRae
April 13	Montreal	Canada	Bell Centre	Jensen McRae
April 14	Toronto	Canada	Scotiabank Arena	Jensen McRae
April 16	Toronto	Canada	Scotiabank Arena	Jensen McRae
April 17	London	Canada	Budweiser Gardens	Jensen McRae
April 20 (Note: This concert was part of High Water Fest.)	North Charleston	United States	Riverfront Park	—N/a
April 21 (Note: This concert was part of Moon Crush Pink Moon.)	Miramar Beach	United States	Seascape Golf Course	—N/a
May 3 (Note: This concert was part of Shaky Knees Music Festival.)	Atlanta	United States	Central Park	—N/a
May 5 (Note: This concert was part of Lovin' Life Music Fest.)	Charlotte	United States	Uptown	—N/a
May 20	Asheville	United States	ExploreAsheville.com Arena	Ryan Beatty
May 22	Asheville	United States	ExploreAsheville.com Arena	Ryan Beatty
May 24	Nashville	United States	Bridgestone Arena	Ryan Beatty
May 25	Nashville	United States	Bridgestone Arena	Ryan Beatty
May 28	Cuyahoga Falls	United States	Blossom Music Center	Ryan Beatty
May 29	Burgettstown	United States	The Pavilion at Star Lake	Ryan Beatty
May 31	Noblesville	United States	Ruoff Music Center	Ryan Beatty
June 1 (Note: This concert was part of Railbird Festival.)	Lexington	United States	The Red Mile	—N/a
June 4	Maryland Heights	United States	Hollywood Casino Amphitheatre	Ryan Beatty
June 5	Bonner Springs	United States	Azura Amphitheater	Ryan Beatty
June 7	Saint Paul	United States	Xcel Energy Center	John Vincent III
June 8	Saint Paul	United States	Xcel Energy Center	John Vincent III
June 11	Dallas	United States	Dos Equis Pavilion	John Vincent III
June 13	The Woodlands	United States	Cynthia Woods Mitchell Pavilion	John Vincent III
June 14	Austin	United States	Moody Center	John Vincent III
June 15	Austin	United States	Moody Center	John Vincent III
June 18	Chula Vista	United States	North Island Credit Union Amphitheatre	John Vincent III
June 20	Los Angeles	United States	Hollywood Bowl	John Vincent III
June 21	Los Angeles	United States	Hollywood Bowl	John Vincent III
June 25	Greenwood Village	United States	Fiddler's Green Amphitheater	Jensen McRae
June 26	Greenwood Village	United States	Fiddler's Green Amphitheater	Jensen McRae
June 29	George	United States	The Gorge	Jensen McRae
July 1	Ridgefield	United States	RV Inn Style Resorts Amphitheater	Jensen McRae
July 3	Wheatland	United States	Toyota Amphitheatre	Jensen McRae
July 5	Berkeley	United States	The Greek Theatre	Jensen McRae
July 6	Berkeley	United States	The Greek Theatre	Jensen McRae
July 9	West Valley City	United States	Utah First Credit Union Amphitheatre	Jensen McRae
July 15	New York	United States	Madison Square Garden	James Bay
July 16	New York	United States	Madison Square Garden	James Bay
July 18	Boston	United States	Fenway Park	Mt. Joy; James Bay
July 19	Boston	United States	Fenway Park	Mt. Joy; James Bay
August 2 (Note: This concert was part of Osheaga.)	Montreal	Canada	Parc Jean-Drapeau	—N/a
August 4 (Note: This concert was part of Hinterland.)	St. Charles	United States	Avenue of the Saints Amphitheater and Event Center	—N/a
August 13	Manchester	England	Co-op Live	Maisie Peters
August 14	Newcastle upon Tyne	England	Utilita Arena	Maisie Peters
August 16 (Note: This concert was part of Electric Picnic.)	Stradbally	Ireland	Stradbally Hall	—N/a
August 17	Belfast	Northern Ireland	Boucher Road Playing Fields	Maisie Peters; Alessi Rose
August 20	Birmingham	England	Utilita Arena Birmingham	Maisie Peters
August 21	London	England	The O2 Arena	Maisie Peters
August 22	London	England	The O2 Arena	Maisie Peters
August 24	Amsterdam	Netherlands	Ziggo Dome	Maisie Peters
August 26 (Note: This concert was part of Stadtpark Open Air.)	Hamburg	Germany	Stadtpark Freilichtbühne	—N/a
August 27 (Note: This concert was part of Citadel Music Festival.)	Berlin	Germany	Zitadelle Spandau	—N/a
September 11	East Troy	United States	Alpine Valley Music Theatre	Jensen McRae
September 13 (Note: This concert was part of Sommo Festival.)	North Rustico	Canada	8779 Route 6, Cavendish	—N/a
September 14 (Note: This concert was part of Sea.Hear.Now Festival.)	Asbury Park	United States	Asbury Park Oceanfront	—N/a
September 19	Essex Junction	United States	Champlain Valley Fairgrounds and Exposition Center	—N/a
September 22 (Note: This concert was part of Sing Out Loud Festival.)	St. Augustine	United States	Francis Field	—N/a
September 28 (Note: This concert was part of Soundside Music Festival.)	Bridgeport	United States	Seaside Park	—N/a
September 29 (Note: This concert was part of Pilgrimage Music & Cultural Festival.)	Franklin	United States	The Park at Harlinsdale Farm	—N/a
