= Live from Fenway Park =

Live From Fenway Park

Live album by Noah Kahan
- Released: August 30, 2024
- Recorded: July 18–19, 2024
- Venue: Fenway Park
- Genre: Folk
- Length: 84:26
- Labels: Mercury; Republic
- Producers: Gabe Simon; Ryan Hewitt

Noah Kahan chronology
Stick Season (2022)	Live From Fenway Park (2024)	The Great Divide (2026)

Live From Fenway Park is a live album by American singer-songwriter Noah Kahan. It includes recordings of songs performed live across two sold-out performances at Fenway Park in Boston, Massachusetts, on July 18–19, 2024. These two dates marked the end of the Stick Season (We'll All Be Here Forever) Tour, having toured in Europe that winter.

== Background ==
The breakout success of Stick Season catapulted Kahan to multiple sold-out tours following its release. Much of his discography refers to places, themes, or concepts unique to residents of the Northeastern United States, and more specifically to New England. His largest performance in Boston prior to this concert was at Boston Calling in 2023.

== Release ==
Noah Kahan teased on social media that he had "more up his sleeve" on August 19. A few days later on August 21, Kahan announced the album's release date of August 30 and its album cover, with the following quote:

Every day I think about playing fenway. I can’t even look at photos without crying. It is a permanent part of my soul, and im so proud to announce it will be a permanent part of my discography. Live From Fenway out 8/30. New England I love you

The tracklist from the released album combines performances from both evenings, which had slightly different setlists. "Everything, Everywhere" featuring Gracie Abrams was taken from the July 18 performance, and the "Stick Season" recordings comes from the July 19 performance with Noah Kahan's family joining him on stage. Additionally, the order of songs on the tracklist does not strictly follow the order in which they were originally performed. The album was released in both explicit and clean versions.

== Track listing ==
No.	Title	Writer(s)	Length
1.	"Dial Drunk"	Noah Kahan, Noah Levine	6:52
2.	"New Perspective"	Kahan	4:59
3.	"Everywhere, Everything" (featuring Gracie Abrams)	Kahan	4:30
4.	"Forever"	Kahan, Gabe Simon	5:07
5.	"Pain Is Cold Water"	Kahan	2:20
6.	"Maine"	Kahan	3:58
7.	"Paul Revere"	Kahan	4:00
8.	"All My Love"	Kahan	4:29
9.	"Your Needs, My Needs"	Kahan, Simon	3:34
10.	"You're Gonna Go Far"	Kahan	4:59
11.	"Homesick"	Kahan	4:17
12.	"Growing Sideways"	Kahan	4:07
13.	"She Calls Me Back"	Kahan	4:08
14.	"Orange Juice"	Kahan	8:25
15.	"Northern Attitude"	Kahan, Simon	5:35
16.	"Mess"	Kahan, Todd Clark	4:07
17.	"The View Between Villages"	Kahan, Clark	4:22
18.	"Stick Season"	Kahan	4:37
Total length:			1:24:26

== Personnel ==
Credits taken from Live from Fenway Park liner notes.

Musicians

- Noah Kahan – acoustic guitar, electric guitar, mandolin, vocals
- Noah Levine – acoustic guitar, background vocals, banjo, electric guitar
- Alex Bachari – background vocals, bass
- Dylan Jones – background vocals, banjo, Hammond organ, keyboards, mandocello, mandolin, piano
- Marcos Valles – background vocals, drums
- Nina de Vitry – acoustic guitar, background vocals, banjo, fiddle, mandolin
- Gracie Abrams – vocals on "Everything, Everywhere"
- James Bay – acoustic guitar and background vocals on "Stick Season"
- Mt. Joy – background vocals on "Stick Season"
- The Kahan Family – background vocals on "Stick Season"

Technical personnel

- Gabe Simon – producer, live sound engineer
- Ryan Hewitt – producer, live sound engineer, Atmos mix
- Bo Bodnar – production assistant
- Tyler Spratt – mix assistant, assistant engineer
- Louis Remenapp – mix assistant
- Ted Jensen – mastering

== Charts ==
Peak chart performances for Live from Fenway Park
Chart (2024–2025)	Peak
US Billboard 200	37
Belgian Albums (Ultratop Flanders)	188
Canadian Albums (Billboard)	89
Irish Albums (IRMA)	72
Dutch Albums (Vinyl)	6
Scottish Albums (Official Charts)	18
Spanish Albums (Vinyl)	71
UK Americana Albums (Official Charts)	4
