= Blue Banisters (song) =

2021 single by Lana Del Rey

Single by Lana Del Rey

from the album Blue Banisters
- Released: May 20, 2021
- Studio: Conway Recording Studios (Los Angeles, CA)
- Length: 4:52
- Label: Interscope; Polydor
- Songwriters: Lana Del Rey; Gabe Simon
- Producer: Gabe Simon

Lana Del Rey singles chronology
| "Tulsa Jesus Freak" (2021) | "Blue Banisters" (2021) | "Arcadia" (2021) |

Music video
- "Blue Banisters" on YouTube

"Blue Banisters" is a song by American singer-songwriter Lana Del Rey. It was released on May 22, 2021, by Interscope Records and Polydor Records alongside "Text Book" and "Wildflower Wildfire" as the joint lead singles for her eighth studio album Blue Banisters. The song was written by Del Rey and Gabe Simon, the latter of whom also produced the song.

== Background and release ==
Lana Del Rey announced the release of her eighth studio album Blue Banisters on April 28, 2021, with the release date initially set for July 4. On May 20, 2021, three singles were surprise-released by Del Rey — "Blue Banisters", "Text Book", and "Wildflower Wildfire" — as "buzz tracks in anticipation of her upcoming 8th studio album". A music video for "Blue Banisters" was released two days before the album on October 20.

"Blue Banisters" is a ballad containing cushioned piano notes and quiet vocal runs. Lyrically, the song delves into the sorrow following a breakup and growing older. Del Rey also alludes to her earlier style by mentioning Russian poetry, and her sister Chuck.

Del Rey revealed the artwork for "Blue Banisters" on April 28, 2021, depicting a selfie that Del Rey had previously posted in August 2020 with a sepia-toned filter. The art, believed to be for the album Blue Banisters rather than the title track's single release, was heavily criticized as being unprofessional looking by both fans and critics.

== Critical reception ==
Steffanee Wang of Nylon described "Blue Banisters" as "a crescendoing, towering ballad", noting how "Del Rey is able to signal her growth in perspective regarding feminism" "elegantly" on the track. Alisha Mughal from Exclaim! emphasized how Del Rey sounds "unprocessed, raw, unaffected, and so, so beautiful" on the song. Ben Bryant from The Independent felt "the stunning, spacious" song "is as luxurious and haunting as a Jim Buckels painting".

== Music video ==
The music video for "Blue Banisters" was released on October 20, 2021. The video features a peaceful setting, where Lana rides a tractor and has fun with her friends painting banisters blue, and decorating cakes. The video is serene until Lana's expression turns serious at the end. Jon Blistein from Rolling Stone described how the "clip toes the line between literally and abstractly complementing the lyrics", a feat also noted by Sam Kemp from Far Out.

An earlier version of the music video was first teased on April 28, 2021 and was set to feature Del Rey's partner at the time, Clayton Johnson, who also posted a picture of himself in his music video costume on November 25, 2020. The original concept was likely scrapped after Del Rey and Johnson broke up.

== Charts ==
Chart performance for "Blue Banisters"
| Chart (2021) | Peak position |
|---|---|
| New Zealand Hot Singles (RMNZ) | 31 |
| US Hot Rock & Alternative Songs (Billboard) | 42 |

== Release history ==
| Region | Date | Format | Label |
|---|---|---|---|
| Various | May 20, 2021 | Digital download; streaming | Interscope; Polydor |
