= Alessi Rose =

English singer-songwriter (born 2002)

- Rose in 2025
- Born: Alessandra Rose Jones; 27 October 2002 (age 24); Littleover, Derby, East Midlands, England
- Occupations: Singer-songwriter; musician
- Years active: 2023–present
- Musical career
- Genres: Pop; indie pop; pop rock
- Labels: Warner Chappell; Polydor; Capitol; AWAL
- Website: alessirosemusic.com

Signature
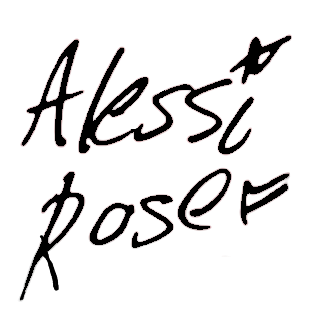

Alessandra Rose Jones (born 27 October 2002) is an English singer-songwriter from Littleover. She has released the EPs Rumination as Ritual, For Your Validation and Voyeur, and served as an opening act for Noah Kahan's 2024 tour, Dua Lipa’s Radical Optimism Tour and Tate McRae's Miss Possessive Tour. Her music has been described as indie pop and pop rock.

== Life and career ==
Alessandra Rose Jones was born on 27 October 2002 in Littleover, Derby. She began writing at the age of 13 and later studied poetry at university in London. That same year, she started uploading videos to YouTube and then to an Instagram account she created specifically to block her entire year group. Towards the end of the COVID-19 lockdown in the United Kingdom, she taught herself music production using a cracked version of Logic Pro X and a fifteen-year-old Mac. She released her debut single "Say Ur Mine," in June 2023. She followed it in October with "Hate This Part,"--a track about leaving her hometown--before performing her first show, a support slot for Ella Jane. In January 2024, she released a third track, "Eat Me Alive", an alt-pop song. From April to July of that same year, she released the single "Break Me" and the EP Rumination as Ritual; the latter included "Crush!", a track about everyone being in love with you as they should. That August, she supported Noah Kahan on the Belfast date of his 2024 tour.

In September 2024, she released "Oh My", an alt-pop song about being nervous to open up to a new partner. The following month, she announced her second EP, For Your Validation, and released "Imsochillandcool", a track about feelings she had about an ex-partner who had entered a new relationship. A further single, "Pretty World," was written during her first few live shows about what she felt immediately after finishing a gig and was released in December 2024. That month, she signed to Warner Chappell Music and was listed on Ticketmaster's Breakthrough 2025 list alongside KiLLOWEN, Myles Smith, Orla Gartland, Sammy Virji, Sienna Spiro, and Swim School, who described her work as indie pop.

Rose kicked off 2025 with a January release of her new single, "Start All Over", a track about wanting a crush to make the first move and the fourth single from For Your Validation, followed by "Don't Ask Questions". She also released For Your Validation that month, which was reviewed positively by Dork and UCLA Radio and contained all five singles and "IKYK". To celebrate its release, she invited a random small group of fans and stan accounts to a listening party. It was announced in February 2025 that she would support Tate McRae for 20 dates on her Miss Possessive Tour and in April that she would support Dua Lipa for all 23 dates on the European leg of her Radical Optimism Tour.

In May 2025, Rose released another single, "Same Mouth", via Capitol Records and Polydor Records, and announced her third EP, Voyeur, which released in July 2025. The EP was called such as she felt listeners would become voyeurs of her innermost thoughts and feelings and because she felt she was a voyeur of herself and her decisions. She then announced a European tour called Voyeur Tour to accompany the EP, which is set to run from September to December. A further single, the alt-rock track "That Could Be Me", was released in June, and was about being in love with someone who was in love with someone else.

Rose announced the deluxe edition of Voyeur at a surprise fan event on Camden Road. It was trailed by the single "First Original Thought", released on 26 September 2025, accompanied by a music video. The deluxe edition was released on 7 November 2025. On 12 November 2025, Rose was listed on Vevo's "DSCVR Artists to Watch" list for 2026 alongside Audrey Hobert, Bay Swag, Kwn, Royel Otis, Sailorr, Sekou, Sienna Spiro, Ty Myers, Waylon Wyatt, and Zeddy Will. She went on to perform at Capital FM's Jingle Bell Ball on 6 December.

In May 2026, Rose released a single, "Skin", via Capitol Records, and went on to release another single "Dependent" in July 2026 before appearing on "The Zane Lowe Show" on Apple Music.

== Artistry ==
Rishi Shah of NME described her as the "Derbyshire Olivia Rodrigo", while Emily Savage of DIY wrote that her vocals "recall a sound that lies somewhere between Gracie Abrams and Taylor Swift" and Jenessa Williams of The Forty-Five described "Pretty World" as a combination of "country, baroque-pop and the melodramatics of emo". Both Rumination as Ritual and For Your Validation were written about Jones's OCD, with the former also exploring her tendency to ruminate and the latter exploring feelings of wanting to be told she is normal. By January 2025, she was routinely being compared to Olivia Rodrigo and Gracie Abrams, though Stuart Clark of Hot Press wrote that month that her voice owed as much to Kate Bush as it did to Rodrigo and Abrams. In an interview that month, Stephen Loftin of Dork described her works as pop rock and Jones stated that she was inspired to be open about her OCD by Abrams, who had been similarly candid about hers, having discovered her in 2016 via Instagram Explore. The visuals for Rumination as Ritual were inspired by The Virgin Suicides.

Growing up, Jones was also a fan of quirky lyrics, such as those by Persephone's Bees, Feist and Lorde, of "artists who love bridges and lengthy, lyrical songs" such as Taylor Swift, and of Chappell Roan. Jones's social media bios have made use of the phrase "If people don't want me to write songs about them, they shouldn't do bad things", a quote Swift prefaced performances of "Forever & Always" with during her Fearless Tour. Jade Wickes of The Face wrote that "Same Mouth" "echoes early Taylor Swift, only with hornier lyrics". In an April 2024 interview with Laura Molloy of NME, she stated that she was also "heavily influenced" by the girl power-imbued teen pop that had been popular in the 2000s, and Molloy wrote of Jones that she was "keen to embrace the messiness inherent to girlhood through confessional, high-octane pop anthems."

== Discography ==
=== Extended plays ===
List of extended plays
Title	Details	Peak chart positions	
Title	Details	UK	AUS
Rumination as Ritual	Released: 3 July 2024; Label: Hunger; Formats: Digital download, streaming	—	—
For Your Validation	Released: 17 January 2025; Label: AWAL; Formats: Digital download, streaming	—	—
Voyeur	Released: 25 July 2025; Label: Capitol, Polydor; Formats: Digital download, streaming, vinyl, CD	42	50

=== Singles ===
Title	Year	Peak chart positions		Album
Title	Year	EST Air.	NZ Hot	Album
"Say Ur Mine"	2023	—	—	Non-album singles
"Hate This Part"	2023	—	—	Non-album singles
"Eat Me Alive"	2024	—	—	Rumination as Ritual
"Break Me"	2024	—	—	Rumination as Ritual
"Lucy"	2024	—	—	Rumination as Ritual
"Oh My"	2024	—	—	For Your Validation
"Imsochillandcool"	2024	—	—	For Your Validation
"Pretty World"	2024	—	—	For Your Validation
"Start All Over"	2025	—	—	For Your Validation
"Don't Ask Questions"	2025	—	—	For Your Validation
"Same Mouth"	2025	—	—	Voyeur
"That Could Be Me"	2025	—	—	Voyeur
"Everything Anything"	2025	—	—	Voyeur
"First Original Thought"	2025	—	8	Voyeur
"Skin"	2026	—	—	TBA
"Dependent"	2026	97	—	TBA
"Fun"	2026	—	—	TBA
"—" denotes a recording that did not chart or was not released in that territory.

=== Music videos and visualisers ===
Title	Year	Director	Ref.
"Say Ur Mine"	2023	Phoebe Lettice Thompson	
"Hate This Part"	2023	Phoebe Lettice Thompson	
"Eat Me Alive"	2024	Phoebe Lettice Thompson	
"Break Me"	2024	Squish	
"Crush!"	2024	Phoebe Lettice Thompson	
"Lucy"	2024	Phoebe Lettice Thompson	
"Oh My"	2024	Phoebe Lettice Thompson	
"Imsochillandcool"	2024	Phoebe Lettice Thompson	
"Pretty World"	2025	Phoebe Lettice Thompson	
"IKYK"	2025	Phoebe Lettice Thompson	
"Same Mouth"	2025	Emanuele Cantò	
"That Could Be Me"	2025	Emanuele Cantò	
"Everything Anything"	2025	Emanuele Cantò	
"Dumb Girl"	2025	Emanuele Cantò	
"Bittersweet"	2025	Emanuele Cantò	
"RIP"	2025	Emanuele Cantò	
"Stella"	2025	Emanuele Cantò	
"Take It or Leave It"	2025	Emanuele Cantò	
"First Original Thought"	2025	Ben Cole	
"Skin"	2026	Phoebe Lettice Thompson	

== Tours ==
Rose performing at Superbloom Festival 2025 in Munich.

Headlining

- Rumination As Ritual Tour (2024)
- For Your Validation Tour (2025)
- Voyeur Tour (2025)

Supporting

- Ella Jane – Ella Jane Tour (2023)
- Fletcher – In Search of the Antidote Tour (2024)
- Noah Kahan – The Stick Season (We'll All Be Here Forever) Tour (2024)
- Tate McRae – Miss Possessive Tour (2025)
- Dua Lipa – Radical Optimism Tour (2025)

== Awards and nominations ==
Organisation	Year	Work	Category	Result	Ref.
Notion New Music Awards	2025	Best New Pop	Alessi Rose	Nominated	
BBC Radio 1	2026	Sound of 2026	Alessi Rose	Nominated	
