= Blue Banisters =

Studio album by Lana Del Rey
- Released: October 22, 2021
- Recorded: May 2013; 2017; 2020 – June 2021
- Studios: Conway (Los Angeles); Dean's List House of Hits (Cypress, Texas); Punto Rec (Turin); TaP (London)
- Genres: Americana; folk; jazz; pop
- Length: 61:54
- Labels: Interscope; Polydor
- Producers: Lana Del Rey; Gabe Simon; Zachary Dawes; Drew Erickson; Dean Reid; Loren Humphrey; Mike Dean; Barrie-James O'Neill; Rick Nowels

Lana Del Rey chronology
Chemtrails over the Country Club (2021)	Blue Banisters (2021)	Did You Know That There's a Tunnel Under Ocean Blvd (2023)

Singles from Blue Banisters
- 1. "Blue Banisters" Released: May 20, 2021; 2. "Arcadia" Released: September 8, 2021

Blue Banisters is the eighth studio album by American singer-songwriter Lana Del Rey. It was released on October 22, 2021, by Interscope and Polydor Records, seven months after her previous record, Chemtrails over the Country Club. The album was produced by Del Rey, Zachary Dawes, Drew Erickson, Loren Humphrey, Mike Dean, Barrie-James O'Neill, Rick Nowels, and several others.

Two singles preceded the album, the title track, "Blue Banisters", and "Arcadia"; "Text Book" and "Wildflower Wildfire" were also released ahead of the album as promotional singles. Blue Banisters peaked at number eight on the US Billboard 200 and reached number one in Argentina and the Netherlands. The album received positive reviews from music critics, most of whom complimented Del Rey's introspective lyrics.

== Background ==
Del Rey released her seventh studio album Chemtrails over the Country Club on March 19, 2021. The next day, she posted on Instagram announcing that an album titled Rock Candy Sweet would be released on June 1. On April 11, Del Rey shared a selfie on Instagram of her looking up to the sky with the caption "Blue Banisters", leading to speculation that it could be a song title. On April 28, Del Rey announced the album would be titled Blue Banisters and would be released on July 4, which was later delayed to October 22. Later the same day, Del Rey posted a trailer for the title track and its accompanying music video to Instagram with the caption: "Sometimes life makes you change just in time for the next chapter" and to Twitter with the caption: "I'm writing my own story. And no one can tell it but me".

== Composition ==
Musically, Blue Banisters has been described as a folk, pop, jazz, and Americana record. It has been described by The A.V. Club lyrically as her "breakup record", while Spin regards it as an "observational project".

In a March 2023 interview with Rolling Stone UK, Del Rey explained that Blue Banisters was created due to accusations of cultural appropriation and previous claims that she glamourized domestic abuse: "I was just like, 'Let me try and write an album that maybe could explain why, if that was true, let's say, I could potentially identify with certain modes of operating'. So, Blue Banisters was more of an explanatory album, more of a defensive album, which is why I didn't promote it, period, at all. I didn't want anyone to listen to it. I just wanted it to be there in case anyone was ever curious for any information."

== Release and promotion ==
The promotion for Blue Banisters was minimal compared to Del Rey's previous releases, mainly due to Del Rey deactivating her social media accounts in September 2021.

The album artwork was revealed via an Instagram post on July 4, 2021, with Del Rey captioning the post "Happy fourth, Album out later". The cover depicts Del Rey sitting on a porch between her dogs, Tex and Mex (who are mentioned in the album's title track). The artwork references Tracy Nelson's album cover for Poor Man's Paradise (1973).

Alternate covers for the album were released on September 8, 2021, alongside the album's track listing and digital and physical pre-orders. Retail chains Target, HMV, and Urban Outfitters revealed their exclusive editions of the record featuring more alternate covers, all photographed by Neil Krug.

On September 3, 2021, Del Rey posted the cover for the single "Arcadia" on her Instagram account and revealed the song would be released the following Wednesday, September 8. A day before the release of the song, Del Rey shared an additional snippet, captioning it with a small written teaser of the album's general themes, mentioning she's never felt the need to explain her story "but if you’re interested this album does tell it- and does pretty much nothing more." On September 8, 2021, the album's pre-order was released along with "Arcadia", revealing the album would be released October 22, 2021.

Blue Banisters was released on October 22, 2021, by Interscope and Polydor Records. The same day, in promotion of the album, Del Rey appeared on the American late-night talk show The Late Show with Stephen Colbert and performed "Arcadia".

=== Singles ===
"Blue Banisters" was released as the album's lead single alongside the songs "Text Book" and "Wildflower Wildfire" on May 20, 2021. A music video was released for the song.

"Arcadia" was released as the album's second single on September 8, 2021, alongside the album pre-order. Two music videos were released.

== Critical reception ==
Professional ratings
Aggregate scores
Source	Rating
AnyDecentMusic?	7.4/10
Metacritic	80/100
Review scores
Source	Rating
AllMusic	3.5/5 stars
The A.V. Club	B+
The Daily Telegraph	4/5 stars
The Guardian	3/5 stars
The Independent	4/5 stars
The Line of Best Fit	7/10
NME	4/5 stars
Pitchfork	7.7/10
Rolling Stone	4/5 stars
Slant Magazine	4/5 stars

Upon release, Blue Banisters received positive reviews from music critics. At Metacritic, which assigns a normalized rating out of 100 to reviews from professional publications, the album received an average score of 80, based on 21 reviews, indicating "generally favorable reviews". Aggregator AnyDecentMusic? gave it 7.4 out of 10, based on their assessment of the critical consensus.

The A.V Club's Tatiana Tenreyo stated "[Blue] Banisters is a reminder that when the singer-songwriter is in charge of her vision and fully taps into her emotions, she's still capable of crafting breathtaking beauty." Mike Wass of Variety wrote the album "offers a rare glimpse of an artist securing her legacy, one song at a time." For The Independent, Ben Bryant wrote a positive review, calling it "one revelation colours the singer's entire body of work", noting "it is far more elliptical and mysterious than it first appears". Giving the album four out of five stars, Sarah Grant of Rolling Stone commented "Her second album of the year is dense and abstract, turning inward and finding solace in sisterhood." Sam Sodomsky for Pitchfork praised Del Rey's songwriting, noting the record "is a sweeping survey of her talent as a songwriter, stripped of the aesthetic borders she often places around her work." Rhian Daly of NME called Blue Banisters "a defiant and delicate return." In their mixed reviews, The Guardian and The Observer critics stated the album struggled from "samey-ness", wavering quality, and familiar but confusing themes.

=== Year-end lists ===
The album was placed in numerous year-end lists of 2021.

Select year-end rankings of Blue Banisters
Publication	List	Rank	Ref.
Slant	The 50 Best Albums of 2021	3	
Exclaim!	Exclaim!'s 50 Best Albums of 2021	31	
NME	The 50 Best Albums of 2021	17	
The Sunday Times	25 Best Albums of 2021	9	
Indie Hoy (Latin America)	The 50 best albums of 2021	10	

== Commercial performance ==
Blue Banisters debuted at number eight on the Billboard 200 with 33,000 album-equivalent units, which consisted of 19,000 pure sales and 14,000 streaming units (calculated from 18.6 million on-demand streams of the album). It was Del Rey's eighth consecutive record to reach the top 10 in the US, but her first to miss the top-three since her Paradise EP (2012); however, Blue Banisters debuted at number one on the Billboard Alternative Album chart. Blue Banisters become her sixth consecutive number one on the chart and her second of the year, after March's Chemtrails over the Country Club, setting a record, with Del Rey being the artist with the most number ones on the Alternative Album charts since its inception.

In the United Kingdom, Blue Banisters debuted at number two on the UK Albums chart, and it stayed on the chart for four weeks. The album was certified Gold in the UK with 100,000 units sold.

== Track listing ==
Blue Banisters track listing
No.	Title	Writer(s)	Producer(s)	Length
1.	"Text Book"	Lana Del Rey; Gabe Simon	Del Rey; Simon; Zachary Dawes; Dean Reid^{[a]}	5:04
2.	"Blue Banisters"	Del Rey; Simon	Del Rey; Simon	4:52
3.	"Arcadia"	Del Rey; Drew Erickson	Del Rey; Erickson	4:24
4.	"Interlude – The Trio"	Ennio Morricone^{[b]}	Clayton Johnson^{[a]}; Chantry Johnson^{[a]}	1:16
5.	"Black Bathing Suit"	Del Rey; Erickson; Dawes	Del Rey; Dawes; Reid	5:18
6.	"If You Lie Down with Me"	Del Rey; Barrie-James O'Neill; Erickson	Del Rey; Erickson; O'Neill^{[a]}	4:25
7.	"Beautiful"	Del Rey; Erickson	Del Rey; Erickson	3:36
8.	"Violets for Roses"	Del Rey; Erickson	Del Rey; Erickson	4:15
9.	"Dealer"	Del Rey; Loren Humphrey; Miles Kane; Tyler Parkford; Dawes	Del Rey; Humphrey; Dawes	4:34
10.	"Thunder"	Del Rey; Dawes	Del Rey; Dawes; Reid^{[a]}; Kieron Menzies^{[a]}	4:19
11.	"Wildflower Wildfire"	Del Rey; Mike Dean; Sean Solymar; Sage Skolfield	Del Rey; Dean	4:46
12.	"Nectar of the Gods"	Del Rey; O'Neill	Del Rey; O'Neill	4:20
13.	"Living Legend"	Del Rey; O'Neill	Del Rey; O'Neill	4:00
14.	"Cherry Blossom"	Del Rey; Rick Nowels	Del Rey; O'Neill; Nowels	3:18
15.	"Sweet Carolina"	Del Rey; Alana Champion; Caroline Grant; Robert Grant Jr.	Del Rey; Erickson	3:22
Total length:				61:54

- ^{^[a]} signifies an additional producer.
- ^{^[b]} "Interlude – The Trio" samples "The Trio", composed by Ennio Morricone for the soundtrack album for The Good, the Bad and the Ugly (1966).

== Personnel ==
Musicians

- Lana Del Rey – vocals (all tracks), horn arrangement (3, 6), string arrangement (3)
- Gabe Simon – piano (1, 2), acoustic guitar, background vocals, bass, drum programming, guitar, keyboards, percussion, sound effects, synth bass (1); organ (2)
- Melodye Perry – background vocals (1, 10)
- Greg Leisz – baritone guitar, pedal steel (1)
- Griffin Goldsmith – drums (1, 5)
- Darren Weiss – drums (1, 10), percussion (10)
- Jacob Braun – cello (3, 8)
- Drew Erickson – horn arrangement (3, 6), organ (3), piano (3, 6–8, 15), string arrangement, synthesizer (3, 8); drum programming (4, 6), keyboards (5), bass, drums, Mellotron (6); Moog bass (6, 8), conductor (8), Rhodes (14, 15)
- Dan Fornero – trumpet (3, 6)
- Wayne Bergeron – trumpet (3, 6)
- Dan Rosenboom – trumpet (3, 6)
- Blake Cooper – tuba (3, 6)
- Zach Dellinger – viola (3, 8)
- Andrew Bulbrook – violin (3, 8)
- Wynton Grant – violin (3, 8)
- Zachary Dawes – bass (5, 9), synth bass (5), keyboards (9), Höfner bass, piano (10)
- Dean Reid – drum programming (5), acoustic guitar (6, 10)
- Benji Lysaght – electric guitar (5, 10)
- Cian Riordan – synth bass (5)
- Loren Humphrey – drums (6, 9, 10), percussion (10)
- Tyler Parkford – keyboards (9)
- Miles Kane – vocals (9)
- Evan Weiss – acoustic guitar, electric guitar (10)
- Lisa Stone – background vocals (10)
- Táta Vega – background vocals (10)
- Owen Pallett – string arrangement, viola, violin (10)
- Mike Dean – keyboards (11)
- Barrie-James O'Neill – guitar (12, 13), piano (12–14)
- Rick Nowels – piano (14)
- Robert Grant Jr. – piano (15)

Technical

- Adam Ayan – mastering engineer (1–10, 12–15)
- Mike Dean – mastering engineer, mixer (11)
- Dean Reid – mixer (1, 3–8, 10, 15), engineer (1, 4–8, 10, 15)
- Gabe Simon – mixer (2), engineer (1, 2)
- Drew Erickson – mixer (3, 6–8, 15)
- Michael Harris – mixer (3–8, 15), engineer (4–8, 15)
- Cian Riordan – mixer (5)
- Jason Wormer – mixer (9)
- Lana Del Rey – mixer (12–14), recording arranger (4)
- Barrie-James O'Neill – mixer (12–14)
- John Congleton – engineer (1, 10)
- Jon Sher – engineer (1), assistant recording engineer (3, 5–8, 15)
- Mai Leisz – engineer (1)
- Loren Humphrey – engineer (9)
- Kieron Menzies – engineer (10)
- Sage Skolfield – engineer, assistant mixer (11)
- Sean Solymar – engineer, assistant mixer (11)
- Ben Fletcher – assistant recording engineer (1, 3, 5–8, 15)
- Alex Tomkins – assistant recording engineer (1)
- Brian Rajaratnam – assistant recording engineer (1)

== Charts ==
=== Weekly charts ===
Weekly chart performance for Blue Banisters
Chart (2021)	Peak position
Argentine Albums (CAPIF)	1
Australian Albums (ARIA)	3
Austrian Albums (Ö3 Austria)	8
Belgian Albums (Ultratop Flanders)	4
Belgian Albums (Ultratop Wallonia)	5
Canadian Albums (Billboard)	10
Croatian Albums (HDU)	21
Czech Albums (ČNS IFPI)	34
Danish Albums (Hitlisten)	17
Dutch Albums (Album Top 100)	1
Finnish Albums (Suomen virallinen lista)	13
French Albums (SNEP)	7
German Albums (Offizielle Top 100)	6
Greek Albums (IFPI)	8
Icelandic Albums (Tónlistinn)	34
Irish Albums (Official Charts)	4
Italian Albums (FIMI)	18
Lithuanian Albums (AGATA)	8
New Zealand Albums (RMNZ)	8
Norwegian Albums (VG-lista)	16
Polish Albums (ZPAV)	4
Portuguese Albums (AFP)	3
Scottish Albums (Official Charts)	3
Slovak Albums (ČNS IFPI)	30
Spanish Albums (Promusicae)	7
Swedish Albums (Sverigetopplistan)	20
Swiss Albums (Schweizer Hitparade)	6
UK Albums (Official Charts)	2
US Billboard 200	8
US Top Alternative Albums (Billboard)	1

=== Year-end charts ===
Year-end chart performance for Blue Banisters
Chart (2021)	Position
Belgian Albums (Ultratop Flanders)	192
US Top Current Album Sales (Billboard)	166

== Certifications ==
Certifications for Blue Banisters
Region	Certification	Certified units/sales
Canada (Music Canada)	Gold	40,000^{‡}
New Zealand (RMNZ)	Gold	7,500^{‡}
Poland (ZPAV)	Platinum	20,000^{‡}
United Kingdom (BPI)	Gold	100,000^{‡}
^{‡} Sales+streaming figures based on certification alone.

== Release history ==
Release dates and formats for Blue Banisters
Region	Date	Format(s)	Label	Ref.
Various	October 22, 2021	Cassette; CD; digital download; streaming	Interscope; Polydor	
Various	October 29, 2021	LP	Interscope; Polydor	
Japan	October 29, 2021	CD	Universal Music Japan	
United States	November 12, 2021	LP (Target exclusive red)	Interscope	
Brazil	December 10, 2021	CD	Universal Music Brasil	
