= Rumination as Ritual =

2024 EP by Alessi Rose

EP by Alessi Rose
- Released: 3 July 2024
- Genres: Alternative pop; Indie pop
- Length: 17:12
- Label: Hunger
- Producers: Josh Scarbrow; Kurisu; Boo; Oli Fox

Alessi Rose chronology
Rumination as Ritual (2024)	For Your Validation (2025)

Singles from Rumination as Ritual
- 1. "Eat Me Alive" Released: 24 January 2024; 2. "Break Me" Released: 4 March 2024; 3. "Lucy" Released: 8 May 2024

Rumination as Ritual (stylized in all lowercase) is the debut extended play (EP) by English singer-songwriter Alessi Rose. It was released on 3 July 2024, by Hunger Records. The EP was supported by the release of three singles and one promotional single, and received positive from critics.

== Background ==
Following the release of singles "Say Ur Mine" and "Hate This Part", Rose began working on Rumination As Ritual in 2023, developing a set of songs that explored themes of emotional depth, self-reflection, and the complexities of relationships. The project was released under Hunger Records on 3 July 2024, marking Rose’s first extended play with the label. Rose describes Rumination as Ritual as an outlet for candid emotional expression. She blends alt-pop hooks with confessional lyricism. Critics later took note that the songs combined raw, personal narratives with polished pop production.

In a feature with Clash Magazine, Rose characterized the project as “a collection of songs that depict various past events that I have over-analyzed and agonized over in the past year”. She further cited The Virgin Suicides as the inspiration of the visuals for the project, praising Sofia Coppola’s unique way of portraying girlhood.

In interviews, Rose described the EP as an outlet for candid emotional expression, blending alt-pop hooks with confessional lyricism. Critics later noted that the songs combined raw, personal narratives with polished pop production.

== Promotion ==
The EP was preceded by three singles—"Eat Me Alive" (24 January 2024), "Break Me" (4 April 2024), and "Lucy" (8 May 2024)—leading up to the launch. A promotional single, “Crush!”, dropped alongside the EP on 3 July 2024. Each track was accompanied by online promotion, with Rose teasing lyrics and artwork via social media in the weeks before release.

Before she released the six-track EP on July 3, 2024, she announced her first headlining tour in the United Kingdom after having her own headline show just a month before where she performed Rumination As Ritual in full early. Each stop on the tour sold out in a few hours.

== Writing and production ==
The first single off the EP "Eat Me Alive" is a catchy pop song that Rose stated that its about "fancying people who don’t like her back." Under the Radar described “Eat Me Alive” as an “oozing love song” and a “twisted ballad,” highlighting how Alessi Rose mournfully “begs for the lovesick ruin she’s still dicing with.” The review praises the emotional depth and vulnerability the track sets as the EP’s opening mood. The single was first played on BBC Radio's Future Pop with Mollie King on January 25, along with the announcement Rose would be playing Latitude Festival the upcoming summer.

The second track off the EP "The Pit" is one of the darker, moodier cuts from Rumination As Ritual, built around a simmering alt-pop production and a measured vocal delivery. Northern Exposure stated that "The Pit" is an emotionally charged track that adopts a much more acoustic and gentler approach". They further praise Rose for her direct approach to lyrical matter. "Crush!" talks about the thrill of someone having a crush on you. Rose personally describes the song in an interview with Clash as "the biggest most outrageous pop song on the ep and teases the idea of someone thinking you’re in love with them when it’s actually the other way around. It’s about being desirable yet totally unbothered. It’s super fun and mocks those people who think everyone’s in love with them".

"Crush!" is followed by the fourth song on the EP called "Break Me". Rose states the song as an exploration of knowingly entering a relationship that is emotionally insincere, yet choosing to continue the relationship despite the awareness. The song has been praised by fans and critics such as the Northern Exposure Magazine. Under the Radar describes "Situationship" as "a combination of Olivia Rodrigo and Gracie Abrams." Rose has said that Abrams has inspired her in a lot of ways regarding her writing and the way she goes through the music industry.

The closing track on the EP is "Lucy," which is a super chill guitar-focused song about a girl Rose used to love/hate back in her school in Derby.

== Critical reception ==
Rumination as Ritual ratings
Review scores
Source	Rating
Under the Radar	10/10

Toby Bryant of Under the Radar rated the EP 10 out of 10, describing it as “pop prodigy stuff” and praising Rose's ability to “pack remarkable personality into just 17 minutes of music.” He highlighted “Eat Me Alive” as “oozing love,” “Lucy” as “a heartfelt letter to a love rival — à la ‘Jolene’ — with striking vulnerability,” and “Crush!” as minimalistic yet emotionally potent.

Keira Knox of Northern Exposure Magazine referred to Rose as “the new IT girl of pop,” appreciating the EP’s “raw honesty” and “emotional ferocity.” Knox referred to “The Pit” as revealing “intimate depth with a gentler, acoustic touch,” while characterizing “Crush!” as a fiery, anthemic alt-pop track.

== Track listing ==
Rumination as Ritual track listing
No.	Title	Writer(s)	Producer(s)	Length
1.	"Eat Me Alive"	Alessi Rose; Benjy Gibson; Oli Fox	Boo; Fox	2:40
2.	"The Pit"	Rose; Chris Thomas	Kurisu	3:04
3.	"Crush!"	Rose; Benjamin Francis Leftwich; Josh Scarbrow	Scarbrow	2:44
4.	"Break Me"	Rose; Thomas	Boo; Kurisu	2:50
5.	"Situationship"	Rose; Thomas	Kurisu	3:10
6.	"Lucy"	Rose; Scarbrow	Scarbrow	2:41
Total length:				17:12

Notes

- "Crush!" is stylized in all caps.

== Personnel ==
Musicians

- Alessi Rose – vocals (all tracks)

Technical

- Stuart Hawkes – master engineering (4)
- Joe Hartwell-Jones – mix engineering (4)
