= For Your Validation =

- Standard cover

EP by Alessi Rose
- Released: 17 January 2025
- Recorded: January–June 2024
- Length: 19:57
- Label: AWAL
- Producers: Adam Yaron; Charlie Hugall; Couros; Josh Scarbrow; Mike Wise; Tommy Baxter

Alessi Rose chronology
Rumination as Ritual (2024)	For Your Validation (2025)	Voyeur (2025)

Singles from For Your Validation
- 1. "Oh My" Released: 16 September 2024; 2. "Imsochillandcool" Released: 23 October 2024; 3. "Pretty World" Released: 4 December 2024; 4. "Start All Over" Released: 1 January 2025; 5. "Don't Ask Questions" Released: 14 January 2025

For Your Validation (stylized in all lowercase) is the second extended play (EP) by English singer-songwriter Alessi Rose. Released on 17 January 2025 by AWAL and spanning six tracks, the EP was trailed by five singles including "oh my", "imsochillandcool", "pretty world", and "start all over" and featured writing and production contributions from Tommy Baxter, Audrey Hobert, and Charlie Hugall. The EP was promoted by a tour, which sold out within ten minutes, and received positive critical reception.

== Background ==
Rose recorded For Your Validation between January and June 2024 and wrote it about the symptoms of her OCD, having also written her first EP – 2024's Rumination as Ritual – about her condition. She announced the EP in October 2024 alongside the futurepop track "Imsochillandcool".

The EP was released through on AWAL on 17 January 2025. To celebrate its release, Rose held a party for a random selection of her fans and fan accounts.

== Promotion ==
On 16 September 2024, she released the lead single "Oh My", an alt-pop track she co-wrote with its producer Tommy Baxter. It was released alongside a video directed by Phoebe Lettice Thompson, the track was written about starting to love someone but feeling insecure and wanting to suit a partner exactly.

Following the EP's announcement in October 2024, Rose released "Imsochillandcool", which was produced by Couros. She wrote the latter with Pura Bliss and about an ex-partner replacing her. Thompson also produced a video for the track. That same month, she announced an eleven-date tour of Europe promoting the EP, which sold out in ten minutes, prompting Rose to book further dates and upgrade several of the venues.

"Pretty World" was released in December 2024. It was written with its producer Charlie Hugall during her first few live shows about the feeling of success she experienced after performing.

In January 2025, Rose surprise-released "Start All Over", which Rose and Audrey Hobert wrote about wanting a crush to make the first move. Upon the EP's release, "Don't Ask Questions" was released as a single. It was written about discovering a partner's ex-girlfriend was not similar to her and opting not to investigate further, while "IKYK" was written about unspoken feelings.

== Critical reception ==
Dork rated "Oh My" as the 92nd best of the year. Dan Harrison wrote that the track "sways into your consciousness with the confidence of someone who knows they're about to become your new favourite thing", while Stuart Clark of Hot Press wrote in January 2025 that lines like "He gives me head while I've been losing mine" are "guaranteed to make your Aunt Bridie blush".

Robin Murray of Clash described the "Imsochillandcool" as "a blast of self-effacing digi-pop dexterity, one that shouts from the heart".

Jenessa Williams of The Forty-Five described the "Pretty World" as a combination of "country, baroque-pop and the melodramatics of emo".

Anagricel Duran of NME wrote that "Start All Over" "opens with a soft, country-reminiscent guitar riff and quickly goes into a pop beat".

Emily Savage of DIY wrote that "IKYK" was written as a combination of "vocoder-splashed vocals", "propulsive basslines and cascading percussion".

Kelsey Barnes of The Line of Best Fit felt that "Don't Ask Questions" was a highlight of the EP, while wrote that the EP brimmed with "uncompromising honesty and infectious wit" and Felicity Newton of Dork described it as a "testament to Alessi Rose's songwriting prowess".

== Track listing ==
For Your Validation track listing
No.	Title	Writer(s)	Producer(s)	Length
1.	"Oh My"	Alessi Rose; Tommy Baxter	Baxter	3:23
2.	"Start All Over"	Rose; Audrey Hobert	Josh Scarbrow	3:26
3.	"IKYK"	Rose; Adam Yaron	Yaron	2:47
4.	"Imsochillandcool"	Rose; Couros Sheibani	Sheibani	3:26
5.	"Pretty World"	Rose; Charlie Hugall	Hugall	3:41
6.	"Don't Ask Questions"	Rose; Mike Wise	Wise	3:15
Total length:				19:57

== Personnel ==
Musicians

- Alessi Rose – vocals (all tracks)

Technical

- Stuart Hawkes – master engineering (all tracks)
- Joe Hartwell-Jones – mix engineering (all tracks)
