= Voyeur (EP) =

2025 EP by Alessi Rose

EP by Alessi Rose
- Released: 25 July 2025
- Length: 24:45
- Label: Capitol; Polydor
- Producer: Adam Yaron; Boo; Casey Smith; Couros; John Hill; Josh Scarbrow; Kurisu; Sam de Jong; Sammy Witte

Alessi Rose chronology
For Your Validation (2025)	Voyeur (2025)

Singles from Voyeur
- 1. "Same Mouth" Released: 16 May 2025; 2. "That Could Be Me" Released: 20 June 2025; 3. "Everything Anything" Released: 18 July 2025; 4. "First Original Thought" Released: 26 September 2025

Voyeur is the third extended play (EP) by English singer-songwriter Alessi Rose. It was released on 25 July 2025 through Capital and Polydor.

== Background ==
Rose released her second EP For Your Validation on 17 January 2025. She announced the release of Voyeur on 15 May 2025, for a 25 July release.

Rose says Voyeur feels like "the most quintessentially 'me' project that I have released so far. My next wave of music feels self-assured, formed through the sounds I have learned to love whilst spending more and more time in the studio working with my favorite people." She described it as being "lyrically based in my most introspective, raw and sometimes uncomfortable thoughts." Rose further said the EP felt massive to her as she was listening to the tracks. She mentioned running over the Williamsburg Bridge and feeling emotional over a project she made and being so proud of it.

The extended play is described as an intimate and atmospheric project, blending bedroom‑pop vulnerability and pop-rock confidence. Rose is said to showcase her knack for turning her tangled emotions into memorable hooks. The EP explores aching self-awareness and a dangerous willingness to fall headfirst into infatuation. Voyeur includes hypnotic vocals, dreamy synth textures, and razor‑sharp lyricism that help bring the whole project together. Each song is said to bring a different angle in the same complicated love story.

== Promotion ==
"Same Mouth" was released on 16 May 2025 as the extended plays first single. "That Could Be Me" and "Everything Anything" were released on 20 June and 18 July, respectively, as the EP's second and third singles.

The deluxe version of the EP was announced in September 2025. "First Original Thought" served as a single from the deluxe edition and was released on 26 September 2025. The deluxe edition was released on 7 November 2025.

In support of the EP, Rose announced the Voyeur Tour. She also opened for Dua Lipa on the European leg of her Radical Optimism Tour, and is set to open for Tate McRae throughout the United States on her Miss Possessive Tour.

== Critical reception ==
Voyeur ratings
Review scores
Source	Rating
Dork	5/5

Jordan Ellison of Dork described Voyeur as there being a delicious boldness throughout the entire project. She also said Rose is not one to watch, but one who has already arrived.

Abby Anderson with All the Things Music Magazine said Rose "is writing the most universally unhinged love songs right now", and that Voyeur "doesn't just introduce her—it cements her as pop's newest cult obsession".

Lydia Sedda of Sonic Hub further said that Rose's voice is "cracking open the veil between performance and personhood", and that she is "not just pop's next big thing, but she is one of its boldest truth-tellers". She described the EP as "bedroom poetry meets full-throttle pop stardom, without ever letting go of the chaos that got her here".

== Track listing ==
Voyeur track listing
No.	Title	Writer(s)	Producer(s)	Length
1.	"Same Mouth"	Alessi Rose; Billy Walsh; Sam de Jong	Josh Scarbrow; de Jong	2:36
2.	"Take It or Leave It"	Rose; Casey Smith; John Hill; Sammy Witte	Hill; Witte	3:38
3.	"Everything Anything"	Rose; Smith; Couros	Smith; Couros	3:21
4.	"Stella"	Rose; Kurisu	Kurisu	2:58
5.	"That Could Be Me"	Rose; Boo; Oli Fox	Boo; Scarbrow	3:17
6.	"RIP"	Rose; Couros	Couros	2:58
7.	"Bittersweet"	Rose; Scarbrow; Matt Maltese	Scarbrow	2:42
8.	"Dumb Girl"	Rose; Adam Yaron	Yaron	3:11
Total length:				24:45

Voyeur deluxe edition track listing
No.	Title	Writer(s)	Producer(s)	Length
9.	"First Original Thought"	Rose; Amy Allen; Blake Slatkin	Slatkin	2:50
10.	"Get Around"	Rose; Yaron; Smith	Yaron	2:20
11.	"Falling Forever"	Rose; Billy Walsh; Patrick Wimberly	Wimberly	3:08
Total length:				33:30

== Personnel ==
Credits adapted from Tidal.

Musicians

- Alessi Rose – vocals (all tracks)
- Josh Scarbrow – bass (1, 5, 7), guitar (1, 5, 7), programming (1, 5, 7), keyboard (7)
- Sam de Jong – bass (1), guitar (1), programming (1)
- Charlie Grimwood – percussion (1, 5, 7), drum kit (7)
- Sammy Witte – bass (2), guitar (2), keyboard (2)
- John Hill – drum kit (2), programming (2)
- Couros – bass (3, 6), drum kit (3, 6), guitar (3, 6), keyboard (3, 6), programming (3, 6)
- Christopher Thomas – bass (4), drum kit (4), guitar (4), keyboard (4), programming (4)
- Boo – keyboard (5), programming (5)
- Oli Fox – keyboard (5)
- David Dyson – drum kit (6)
- Adam Yaron – background vocals (10), bass (8, 10), drum kit (8, 10), guitar (8, 10), keyboard (8, 10), programming (8, 10)
- Blake Slatkin – bass (9), drum kit (9), guitar (9), keyboard (9), percussion (9), programming (9)
- Casey Smith – background vocals (10)
- Patrick Wimberly – bass (11), guitar (11), keyboard (11), programming (11)

Technical

- Stuart Hawkes – mastering (1–8)
- Ruairi O'Flaherty – mastering (9)
- Nathan Dantzler – mastering (10–11)
- Simon Todkill – mixing (1–8), engineering (1, 5, 7)
- Jon Castelli – mixing (9)
- Geoff Swan – mixing (10)
- Mitch McCarthy – mixing (11)
- Jacob Tresidder – engineering (1)
- John Hill – engineering (2)
- Sammy Witte – engineering (2)
- Walker Steele – engineering (2)
- Couros – engineering (3, 6)
- Kurisu – engineering (4)
- Beatrice Balagna – engineering (5, 7)
- Adam Yaron – engineering (8, 10)
- Blake Slatkin – engineering (9)
- Patrick Wimberly – engineering (11)

== Charts ==
Chart (2025)	Peak position
Australian Albums (ARIA)	50
Belgian Albums (Ultratop Flanders)	11
Belgian Albums (Ultratop Wallonia)	195
Dutch Albums (Album Top 100)	12
UK Albums (OCC)	42
