= Arcadia (Lana Del Rey song) =

2021 single by Lana Del Rey

Single by Lana Del Rey

from the album Blue Banisters
- Released: September 8, 2021
- Genre: Chamber pop • alternative pop
- Length: 4:23
- Label: Interscope; Polydor
- Songwriters: Lana Del Rey; Drew Erickson
- Producers: Lana Del Rey; Drew Erickson

Lana Del Rey singles chronology
"Blue Banisters" (2021)	"Arcadia" (2021)	"Watercolor Eyes" (2022)

Music video
- "Arcadia" on YouTube

"Arcadia" is a song by American singer-songwriter Lana Del Rey. It was released on September 8, 2021, by Interscope Records and Polydor Records as the second and final single from Del Rey's eighth studio album, Blue Banisters (2021). The song was written and produced by the singer alongside Drew Erickson. The song is named after Arcadia, California.

== Critical reception ==
In an article for the Los Angeles Times, Christi Carras described the song as a "languid new ballad" and music video as "love letters to Arcadia and Los Angeles". Writing for Spin, Sarah Grant called the single "elegant and elegiac", with Del Rey's vocals "liberated, clear-eyed, and mournful" as she "sings her origin story with an innocence". Grant further praised the track as an "astonishing farewell to an industry that trashed [Del Rey] from the beginning". Reanna Cruz from NPR acclaimed Del Rey's vocals as her "most mature tone yet" and wrote that the lyrics "carefully construct the very landscapes she describes", "[connecting] fully with her desired ethos". Writing for Consequence, Eddie Fu praised the song's "piano-driven production", calling it a "seductive track".

== Music video ==
The music video for "Arcadia" was released on YouTube alongside the song on September 8, 2021. It was directed by Del Rey, although the singer stated on Twitter that it was "directed by nobody". An alternate video was released on October 7, 2021.

== Live performances ==
On October 22, 2021, Del Rey appeared on the American late-night talk show, The Late Show with Stephen Colbert, and performed "Arcadia".

== Personnel ==
Credits adapted from Tidal.

- Lana Del Rey – writer, vocals, producer, wind and string arrangements
- Drew Erickson – writer, producer, piano, synthesizer, organ, wind and string arrangements, mixing
- Jacob Brown – cello
- Wayne Bergeron – trumpet
- Dan Fornero – trumpet
- Dan Rosenbom – trumpet
- Andrew Bulbrook – violin
- Wynton Grant – violin
- Blake Cooper – tuba
- Zac Dellinger – viola
- Dean Reed – engineering, mixing
- Michael Harris – engineering, mixing
- Ben Fletcher – engineering assistant
- John Scher – engineering assistant
- Adam Ayan – mastering

== Charts ==
Chart performance for "Arcadia"
Chart (2021)	Peak position
New Zealand Hot Singles (RMNZ)	21
US Hot Rock & Alternative Songs (Billboard)	40

== Release history ==
Region	Date	Format	Label	Ref.
Various	September 8, 2021	Digital download; streaming	Interscope; Polydor	
Italy	October 1, 2021	Airplay	Universal	
