= Call Your Mom =

2023 single by Noah Kahan and Lizzy McAlpine

Single by Noah Kahan and Lizzy McAlpine

from the album Stick Season (Forever)
- Released: September 15, 2023
- Length: 4:38
- Label: Mercury; Republic
- Songwriters: Noah Kahan; Todd Clark
- Producers: Gabe Simon; Kahan

Noah Kahan singles chronology
"Dial Drunk" (2023)	"Call Your Mom" (2023)	"She Calls Me Back" (2023)

Lizzy McAlpine singles chronology
"Ceilings" (2023)	"Call Your Mom" (2023)	"You Could Start a Cult" (2023)

"Call Your Mom" is a song by American singer-songwriter Noah Kahan, included on the expanded edition of his studio album Stick Season (2022), subtitled We'll All Be Here Forever, released on June 9, 2023. A duet version of the track, with American singer-songwriter Lizzy McAlpine, was released through Mercury Records and Republic Records on September 15, 2023, as the second single from Stick Season (Forever), another edition of the record.

== Background ==
Before the announcement of the duet version, Noah Kahan invited Lizzy McAlpine to join him in performing the track live in Los Angeles, at this 2023–2024 concert tour, in which the song was included. Explaining that it is a "tough one" to take on during his shows, the singer stated: "For those asking about 'Call Your Mom' live just know that it is difficult for me to perform that one live every night. I'm hoping I learn to perform it with more composure but for now it’s very much a work in progress".

Months after the release of the duet of "Dial Drunk" with Post Malone, Kahan teased a joint song via social media in September 2023, with a video snippet and a caption that said: "The most special voice on a song that means a whole lot to me". The remix was announced on September 12, along with its release date.

== Critical reception ==
Described as a "hard-hitting" song, its "grim and melancholy lyrics" were praised, as well as McAlpine's feature.

== Charts ==
Chart performance for "Call Your Mom"
Chart (2023–2024)	Peak position
Canada Hot 100 (Billboard)	68
Ireland (IRMA)	32
New Zealand Hot Singles (RMNZ)	14
UK Singles (Official Charts)	83
US Bubbling Under Hot 100 (Billboard)	5
US Hot Rock & Alternative Songs (Billboard)	9

== Certifications ==
Certifications for "Call Your Mom"
Region	Certification	Certified units/sales
Canada (Music Canada)	Platinum	80,000^{‡}
New Zealand (RMNZ)	Gold	15,000^{‡}
United Kingdom (BPI)	Platinum	600,000^{‡}
United States (RIAA)	Gold	500,000^{‡}
^{‡} Sales+streaming figures based on certification alone.
