= Hurt Somebody =

2017 single by Noah Kahan and Julia Michaels

- Solo single cover

Single by Noah Kahan and Julia Michaels

from the album Busyhead and the EP Hurt Somebody
- Released: September 15, 2017
- Recorded: Golden Age and Conway (Los Angeles)
- Length: 2:48
- Label: Republic
- Songwriters: Noah Kahan; Scott Harris
- Producer: Joel Little

Noah Kahan singles chronology
"Fine" (2017)	"Hurt Somebody" (2017)	"Come Down" (2018)

Julia Michaels singles chronology
"I Miss You" (2017)	"Hurt Somebody" (2018)	"Heaven" (2018)

Audio video
- "Noah Kahan, Julia Michaels - Hurt Somebody (Official Audio)" on YouTube

"Hurt Somebody" is a song by American singer-songwriter Noah Kahan, released on September 15, 2017, as the lead single from his extended play of the same name. The song was written by Kahan and Scott Harris in Nashville and was recorded with Joel Little in Los Angeles. Kahan told Billboard: "'Hurt Somebody' is about the paralyzing fear of not being able to cut loose ends – even if it's ultimately for the greater good. Ending things can be painful, and 'Hurt Somebody' illuminates the inner dialogue of trying to stomach the weight of that decision."

A duet version with American singer Julia Michaels was released on January 12, 2018.

== Reception ==
Nic Kelly from Project U said: "It has that instantly addictive feeling to it. It's simple, understated and melodically perfect."

Mitch Mosh from Atwood Magazine, in a review of the EP, wrote: "Originally released as a solo performance, Michaels' presence adds new perspective, harmony and vision to an already-intense song about the fear of cutting loose ends." It was featured in the 2018 movie The Darkest Minds.

== Track listing ==
Digital download (Noah Kahan solo)
No.	Title	Length
1.	"Hurt Somebody"	2:48

Digital download (Noah Kahan with Julia Michaels)
No.	Title	Length
1.	"Hurt Somebody"	2:48

Digital download – (Noah Kahan with Julia Michaels) [Alex Adair remix]
No.	Title	Length
1.	"Hurt Somebody"	3:30

== Personnel ==
Personnel taken from Busyhead CD booklet.

Musicians

- Noah Kahan – vocals
- Julia Michaels – vocals
- Joel Little – acoustic guitar, bass, drum programming, keyboards, percussion

Technical

- Joel Little – production, recording (Golden Age)
- Sam de Jong – co-production, recording (Golden Age)
- Benjamin Rice – vocal production and recording (Conway)
- Scott Harris – additional vocal production
- Mark "Spike" Stent – mixing
- Michael Freeman – mixing assistance
- Greg Calbi – mastering
- Steve Fallone – mastering

== Charts ==
=== Weekly charts ===
Weekly chart performance for "Hurt Somebody"
Chart (2017–2018)	Peak position
Australia (ARIA)	14
Belgium (Ultratip Bubbling Under Flanders)	8
Denmark Airplay (Tracklisten)	17
Netherlands (Dutch Top 40)	13
Netherlands (Single Top 100)	33
New Zealand (Recorded Music NZ)	29
Switzerland Airplay (Schweizer Hitparade)	14
Sweden (Sverigetopplistan)	88
US Adult Pop Airplay (Billboard)	35
US Hot Rock & Alternative Songs (Billboard)	24

=== Year-end charts ===
Year-end chart performance for "Hurt Somebody"
Chart (2018)	Position
Australia (ARIA)	42
Netherlands (Dutch Top 40)	71
US Hot Rock Songs (Billboard)	65

== Certifications ==
Certifications for "Hurt Somebody"
Region	Certification	Certified units/sales
Australia (ARIA)	5× Platinum	350,000^{‡}
Canada (Music Canada)	2× Platinum	160,000^{‡}
Denmark (IFPI Danmark)	Gold	45,000^{‡}
New Zealand (RMNZ)	3× Platinum	90,000^{‡}
Norway (IFPI Norway)	Gold	30,000^{‡}
United Kingdom (BPI)	Gold	400,000^{‡}
United States (RIAA)	Gold	500,000^{‡}
Streaming
Sweden (GLF)	Gold	4,000,000^{†}
^{‡} Sales+streaming figures based on certification alone.^{†} Streaming-only figures based on certification alone.

== Release history ==
Release history and formats for "Hurt Somebody"
Region	Date	Format	Version	Label	Ref.
Various	September 16, 2017	Digital download, streaming	Solo	Republic	
Various	January 12, 2018	Digital download, streaming	Duet version	Republic	
Various	March 2, 2018	Digital download, streaming	Duet version (Alex Adair remix)	Republic	
