= I Was / I Am =

Studio album by Noah Kahan
- Released: September 17, 2021
- Studios: Golden Age (Los Angeles, United States); The Clubhouse (Titirangi, New Zealand); Mmm (Auckland, New Zealand)
- Length: 36:49
- Labels: Republic; UMG
- Producers: Joel Little; Mark Rankin

Noah Kahan chronology
Cape Elizabeth (2020)	I Was / I Am (2021)	Stick Season (2022)

Singles from I Was / I Am
- 1. "Godlight" Released: June 30, 2021; 2. "Animal" Released: August 6, 2021; 3. "Someone Like You" Released: September 16, 2021

I Was / I Am is the second studio album by American singer-songwriter Noah Kahan, released on September 17, 2021. The album was released through Republic Records and UMG Recordings, Inc. Three singles "Godlight", "Animal", and "Someone Like You (featuring Joy Oladokun)" were released prior to the album's release.

== Background ==
Kahan states this album was created with the idea of "who I am as compared to who I was" in mind. The album was released more than a year after Kahan's EP Cape Elizabeth, and demonstrates Kahan's ideas of personal growth and reflection, and was developed during the COVID-19 pandemic. Kahan developed this album after he returned to Los Angeles in late 2020.

Kahan started developing the album with producers Joel Little and Mark Rankin over Zoom meetings. Kahan was able to write about his mental health issues, breaking some of the stigma's surrounding mental illness, connecting with many listeners and helping them feel less alone.

Kahan embarked on the 'I Was / I Am Tour' spanning from October 14, 2021, in St. Louis until December 19, 2021, in Phoenix.

== Reception ==
After the album was released, I Was / I Am was described as a "powerfully and unapologetically honest personal statement" by Mitch Mosk of Atwood Magazine and many of the songs "took on a life of their own".

== Track listing ==
No.	Title	Writer(s)	Length
1.	"Part of Me"	Noah Kahan; Nick Atkinson; Edd Holloway	3:59
2.	"Animal"	Kahan; Ryan Keen	3:39
3.	"Caves"	Kahan; Scott Harris	3:21
4.	"Bad Luck"	Kahan; Gregg Wattenberg; Kellen Pomeranz	3:11
5.	"Godlight"	Kahan	4:07
6.	"Someone Like You" (featuring Joy Oladokun)	Kahan; Todd Clark	3:06
7.	"Fear of Water"	Kahan; Sarah Aarons; Joel Little	2:51
8.	"Hollow"	Kahan; Emily Wallen; Stephen Kozmeniuk	4:32
9.	"Bury Me"	Kahan; John Hill; Sammy Witte	3:14
10.	"Howling"	Kahan	4:45
Total length:			36:49

== Personnel ==
Personnel taken from I Was / I Am liner notes.

Musicians

- Noah Kahan – lead vocals (all tracks); backing vocals (1–9); acoustic guitar (1–5, 8–10); electric guitar (2, 6, 8); piano (4)
- Joel Little – keyboards, drum programming (tracks 1–6, 8, 9); synthesizers (1, 2, 4, 7, 8); electric guitar (1, 2, 5, 8); bass (1, 3, 5, 8, 9); percussion (1, 3, 4, 9); acoustic guitar (2); backing vocals (7)
- Mark Rankin – backing vocals (tracks 1, 4, 5; keyboards (2–4); drum programming (2, 3, 5); synthesizer (2, 3)
- Joy Oladokun – featuring artist (track 6)
- Sarah Aarons – piano, backing vocals (track 7)
- Mahuia Bridgman-Cooper – violin (track 7)
- Peau Halapua – violin (track 7)
- Joel Harrower – viola (track 7)
- James Bush – cello (track 7)

Technical

- Joel Little – production, engineering (all tracks)
- Mark Rankin – production (tracks 1–3, 10); engineering (1–6, 8–10); mixing (all tracks); additional production (4–6, 9); co-production (8)
- Stephen "Koz" Kozmeniuk – co-production (track 8)
- Todd Clark – engineering (track 6)
- Mahuia Bridgman-Cooper – engineering, string arrangement (track 7)
- Hunter Airheart – video directing

== Charts ==
Chart performance for I Was / I Am
Chart (2024)	Peak position
Dutch Albums (Album Top 100)	59
Scottish Albums (Official Charts)	15
UK Albums (Official Charts)	70
US Billboard 200	154
