= Northern Attitude =

Single by Noah Kahan featuring Hozier

from the album Stick Season (Forever)
- Released: November 10, 2023
- Genre: Folk-pop
- Length: 4:27
- Label: Mercury; Republic
- Songwriters: Noah Kahan; Gabe Simon
- Producers: Gabe Simon; Noah Kahan

Noah Kahan singles chronology
"Stick Season" (2022)	"Northern Attitude" (2023)	"Dial Drunk" (2023)

Hozier singles chronology
"De Selby (Part 2)" (2023)	"Northern Attitude" (2023)	"Too Sweet" (2024)

Lyric video
- "Northern Attitude" on YouTube

Duet version lyric video
- "Northern Attitude" (with Hozier) on YouTube

"Northern Attitude" is a song by American singer-songwriter Noah Kahan, released on September 16, 2022 as the second single from his third studio album, Stick Season. Kahan and Gabe Simon wrote and produced the track together. On November 10, 2023, a duet version of the song with vocals from Irish singer-songwriter Hozier, was released through Mercury Records and Republic Records. This version was part of Stick Season (Forever), another edition of the album.

== Background ==
"Northern Attitude" carries a theme of isolation and conveys the feelings Kahan had struggled to express about the profound loneliness and clarity of self he felt growing up in Strafford, Vermont, a rural and isolated town with a population of under 2,000 people. The long, chilly, and gloomy winters of his hometown led Kahan to develop a more closed-off heart. In the song, he asks for understanding and forgiveness, opening up about the adversities he faced and connecting with others from similarly secluded environments.

Kahan revealed that the song was created unexpectedly during a recording session when he experimented with a guitar riff. Encouraged by his co-producer and the recording engineer, Kahan developed the song, freestyling lyrics that tapped into deep-seated themes of isolation and self-discovery. Using the bleakness of winter to symbolize a closed heart, Kahan addresses the "northern attitude" of hesitancy and fear in relationships, which stemmed from his solitary upbringing. However, he offers a hopeful perspective that this mindset can evolve over time.

== Composition ==
"Northern Attitude" draws on the harmonies, instrument selection, and a rhythmic chorus, portraying a heart hardened and isolated winter. The song begins with Gabe Simon strumming the mandolin. As the pace quickens, Holler Country describes Kahan's reverb-rich vocals deepening at the chorus and a dramatic piano enhancing the mood. In the second verse, Hozier's emotive voice intensifies the music further. The song culminates in a euphoric, high-energy finale, as described by Holler Country.

== Release ==
Kahan teased "Northern Attitude" in August 2022, a few weeks before the official release, on TikTok to preview his third album, Stick Season. The clip has over 1.1 million views and 200 thousand likes. It significantly heightened the excitement for the official release of the song in September 2022.

The day Kahan received his first Grammy nomination, for Best New Artist, he released a new version of "Northern Attitude" with Hozier. Kahan shared his excitement about working with Hozier, one of his biggest musical inspirations, through Twitter. On TikTok, he playfully insisted that fans should only listen to the new version featuring Hozier, declaring that the original solo version is off-limits. Kahan and Hozier held several live performances of the song in late 2023, including a rendition at Kahan's Nashville show in early October.

"Northern Attitude" is scheduled to be released as a 7-inch vinyl exclusively in Canada on November 27, 2024; it features both solo and duet versions of the song.

== Personnel ==
Personnel taken from Northern Attitude single.

- Noah Kahan – vocals, background vocals, rubber bridge guitar
- Gabe Simon – 12 string guitar, piano, acoustic guitar, mandolin, bass guitar, drums, organ, percussion, background vocals
- Konrad Snyder – piano
- Hozier – vocals (Stick Season Forever version)

== Charts ==
=== Weekly charts ===
Weekly chart performance for "Northern Attitude"
Chart (2023–2024)	Peak position
Canada (Canadian Hot 100)	21
Canada Rock (Billboard)	20
Global 200 (Billboard)	55
Ireland (IRMA)	5
New Zealand (Recorded Music NZ)	39
UK Singles (OCC)	16
US Billboard Hot 100	37
US Hot Rock & Alternative Songs (Billboard)	7
US Rock & Alternative Airplay (Billboard)	22

=== Year-end charts ===
2024 year-end chart performance for "Northern Attitude"
Chart (2024)	Position
Canada (Canadian Hot 100)	88
US Hot Rock & Alternative Songs (Billboard)	39

== Certifications ==
Certifications for "Northern Attitude"
Region	Certification	Certified units/sales
Canada (Music Canada)	2× Platinum	160,000^{‡}
New Zealand (RMNZ)	2× Platinum	60,000^{‡}
United Kingdom (BPI)	Gold	400,000^{‡}
United States (RIAA)	Platinum	1,000,000^{‡}
^{‡} Sales+streaming figures based on certification alone.
