= Everywhere, Everything =

2023 single by Noah Kahan and Gracie Abrams

Single by Noah Kahan and Gracie Abrams

from the album Stick Season (Forever)
- Released: December 1, 2023
- Genre: Folk-pop
- Length: 4:17
- Label: Mercury; Republic
- Songwriter: Noah Kahan
- Producers: Gabe Simon; Kahan

Noah Kahan singles chronology
"She Calls Me Back" (2023)	"Everywhere, Everything" (2023)	"Homesick" (2024)

Gracie Abrams singles chronology
"I Know It Won't Work" (2023)	"Everywhere, Everything" (2023)	"Risk" (2024)

"Everywhere, Everything" is a song recorded by American singer-songwriter Noah Kahan, for his third studio album Stick Season, released on October 14, 2022. The track was written and produced by Kahan, along with Gabe Simon. A duet version of the song, with vocals from American singer-songwriter Gracie Abrams, was released on December 1, 2023, as the fourth single from the album's 2024 expanded edition, subtitled Forever. The song was predominantly featured in the promotional materials and closing credits for the 2025 film Regretting You.

== Background, composition, and release ==
As a "Thanksgiving surprise", Noah Kahan teased a duet version of the song on his TikTok account, with a snippet of Gracie Abrams' verse. On the following day, November 23, he confirmed the duet, set to be released on Friday, December 1.

"Everywhere, Everything" is a folk-pop song, with an anthemic quality while the artists sing the romantic lyrics: "Everywhere, everything, I wanna love you/ 'til we're food for the worms to eat/ 'til our fingers decompose, keep my hands in yours." It was also described as a "folky acoustic ballad", where their voices "mesh beautifully during the visceral hook".

Upon the release of the song, Kahan stated: "Gracie puts her whole heart into every song she writes and note she sings and I found myself completely swept into her world the first time I heard her." Abrams added: "I'm constantly in awe of the heart and sincerity behind each of his songs, and I feel crazy lucky for the opportunity to sing on one of my favorites. Noah really is the best, and I am simply a fan."

== Live performance ==
Kahan and Abrams performed "Everywhere, Everything" on February 2, 2024 at Spotify's Best New Artist Pre-Grammys Party, at Paramount Studios. Kahan played an acoustic guitar while Abrams sang along.

Kahan brought Abrams out as a surprise guest at his show at Fenway Park on July 18, 2024. An official recording was included on the album Live from Fenway Park released August 30, 2024.

At his headline show at BST Hyde Park in London on July 4, 2025, the pair once again sang the song together. Abrams was a special guest and had opened for Kahan.

Kahan joined Abrams as a surprise guest during her July 24, 2025 show at TD Garden for her The Secret of Us Tour to perform the song together.

== Commercial performance ==
In the United States, the single debuted and peaked at number 79 on the Billboard Hot 100, with all versions combined for 6.2 million official streams and 1,000 downloads, according to Luminate. With her appearance, Abrams scored her first entry on the chart. The track also peaked at number 9 on the Hot Rock & Alternative Songs chart, becoming Abrams' first top ten.

== Charts ==
=== Weekly charts ===
Weekly chart performance for "Everywhere, Everything"
Chart (2023–2025)	Peak position
Canada Hot 100 (Billboard)	60
Ireland (IRMA)	21
New Zealand Hot Singles (RMNZ)	6
UK Singles (Official Charts)	72
US Billboard Hot 100	79
US Hot Rock & Alternative Songs (Billboard)	9

=== Year-end charts ===
Year-end chart performance for "Everywhere, Everything"
Chart (2024)	Position
US Hot Rock & Alternative Songs (Billboard)	50

== Certifications ==
Certifications for "Everywhere, Everything"
Region	Certification	Certified units/sales
Australia (ARIA) Duet version	Platinum	70,000^{‡}
Canada (Music Canada)	Platinum	80,000^{‡}
New Zealand (RMNZ) Duet version	Gold	15,000^{‡}
United Kingdom (BPI)	Platinum	600,000^{‡}
United States (RIAA)	2× Platinum	2,000,000^{‡}
^{‡} Sales+streaming figures based on certification alone.
