= Busyhead =

2019 album by American singer Noah Kahan

Studio album by Noah Kahan
- Released: June 14, 2019
- Studios: Golden Age (Los Angeles); Conway (Los Angeles); Mt. Eden (Nashville); Sun Mountain (Boiceville, New York)
- Length: 35:24
- Label: Republic
- Producers: David Baron; Todd Clark; Simone Felice; Joel Little

Noah Kahan chronology
Hurt Somebody (2018)	Busyhead (2019)	Cape Elizabeth (2020)

Singles from Busyhead
- 1. "Young Blood" Released: January 27, 2017; 2. "Sink" Released: May 5, 2017; 3. "Hurt Somebody" Released: September 15, 2017; 4. "False Confidence" Released: September 21, 2018; 5. "Mess" Released: March 1, 2019; 6. "Cynic" Released: June 10, 2019; 7. "Busyhead" Released: June 13, 2019

Busyhead is the debut studio album by American singer-songwriter Noah Kahan, released by Republic Records on June 14, 2019. The majority of the tracks on Busyhead were produced by New Zealand musician Joel Little.

== Track listing ==
Busyhead track listing
No.	Title	Writer(s)	Producer(s)	Length
1.	"False Confidence"	Noah Kahan; Chris DeStefano	Joel Little	3:43
2.	"Mess"	Kahan; Todd Clark	Little; Clark^{[v]}	3:33
3.	"Hurt Somebody" (with Julia Michaels)	Kahan; Scott Harris	Little; Sam de Jong^{[c]}; Benjamin Rice^{[v]}; Harris^{[a]}^{[v]}	2:47
4.	"Young Blood"	Kahan	Little	3:28
5.	"Busyhead"	Kahan; Dan Wilson	Clark	4:14
6.	"Cynic"	Kahan; Little	Little	3:28
7.	"Save Me"	Kahan; Harris	Little	2:58
8.	"Sink"	Kahan	Little	3:45
9.	"Tidal"	Kahan; Phineas Choukas	Little	3:34
10.	"Carlo's Song"	Kahan; Aron Wright	David Baron; Simone Felice; Clark^{[v]}	3:54
Total length:				35:24

Notes

- ^{^[c]} signifies a co-producer.
- ^{^[v]} signifies a vocal producer.

== Personnel ==
Musicians

- Noah Kahan – vocals (all tracks), acoustic guitar (tracks 1, 4, 8–10), background vocals (1, 4, 8), electric guitar (5, 6, 8)
- Joel Little – bass, keyboards, percussion (tracks 1–4, 6–9); drum programming (1–3, 6, 7, 9), electric guitar (1, 2, 7), background vocals (1, 8), acoustic guitar (2, 3), programming (4, 8), piano (7)
- Todd Clark – background vocals, electric guitar (tracks 2, 5, 10); acoustic guitar (track 2); programming (5, 10); keyboards, percussion (5)
- Julia Michaels – vocals (track 3)
- Benjamin Barter – drums (track 4)
- Byron Isaacs – background vocals (track 10)
- Simone Felice – background vocals, drums, percussion (track 10)
- David Baron – drum programming, keyboards, percussion (track 10)
- Brian Goss – electric guitar (track 10)

Technical

- Joel Little – mixing (track 1), engineering (1–4, 6–9)
- Mark "Spike" Stent – mixing (tracks 2, 3)
- Neal Avron – mixing (tracks 4, 6–9)
- Serge Courtois – mixing (tracks 5, 10)
- Benjamin Rice – engineering (track 3)
- Sam de Jong – engineering (track 3)
- Todd Clark – engineering (track 5)
- Michael Freeman – mixing assistance (tracks 2, 3)
- Scott Skyrzynski – mixing assistance (tracks 4, 6–9)
- Chris Gehringer – mastering (track 1)
- Greg Calbi – mastering (tracks 2–10)
- Steve Fallone – mastering (tracks 2–10)

== Charts ==
Chart (2019)	Peak position
Australian Hitseekers Albums (ARIA)	10
Canadian Albums (Billboard)	83
US Heatseekers Albums (Billboard)	1

== Certifications ==
Certifications and sales for Busyhead
Region	Certification	Certified units/sales
Canada (Music Canada)	Gold	40,000^{‡}
United Kingdom (BPI)	Gold	100,000^{‡}
^{‡} Sales+streaming figures based on certification alone.
