= Stick Season (song) =

Single by Noah Kahan

from the album Stick Season
- Written: 2020
- Released: July 8, 2022
- Recorded: 2022
- Studio: The Study (Nashville)
- Genre: Folk
- Length: 3:02
- Label: Mercury; Republic
- Songwriter: Noah Kahan
- Producers: Gabe Simon; Noah Kahan

Noah Kahan singles chronology
"Someone like You" (2021)	"Stick Season" (2022)	"Northern Attitude" (2022)

Music video
- "Stick Season" on YouTube

"Stick Season" is a song by American singer-songwriter Noah Kahan, released as the lead single from his album Stick Season on July 8, 2022. Kahan wrote the song and produced it with Gabe Simon. Although moderately successful in the US upon release, the song went viral on TikTok and charted internationally after American singer-songwriter Olivia Rodrigo covered it on BBC Radio 1 in the United Kingdom, causing it to reach number one in various countries including Australia, Belgium (Flanders), Ireland, the Netherlands, and the United Kingdom, as well as charting in the top 10 in Canada, New Zealand, and the United States.

== Background and composition ==
An early version of the song was performed on a live stream on Kahan's Instagram, broadcast some time shortly prior to November 3, 2020. Kahan wrote a verse of the song during a "bout of insecurity" and uploaded it to TikTok in 2022. It became successful quickly, prompting him to finish writing the song, which "ended up taking a long time". Kahan was also concerned whether a song written "specifically about his home state of Vermont" would connect with people who live elsewhere, but responses to the completed song were universally positive.

The song title refers to a term for autumn in New England, the period after Halloween before the winter snow begins, which Kahan called "a time of transition" and "super depressing" as "it just means that winter is coming soon and it creates a lot of anxiety" and "nobody really likes it".

This song is a folk piece written in A major, with a tempo of 115–118 BPM and a 4/4 time signature. The chord progression throughout is A–E–F♯m–D.

The melody was later interpolated in the chorus to Stella Lefty's 2026 country pop song "Boston", for which Kahan retroactively received a songwriting credit.

== Accolades ==
Awards and nominations for "Stick Season"
Organization	Year	Category	Result	Ref.
BRIT Awards	2024	International Song	Nominated	
BRIT Awards	2025	International Song	Nominated	
Billboard Music Awards	2024	Top Rock Song	Nominated	

== Personnel ==
Personnel taken from Stick Season single, and Song Exploder.

- Noah Kahan – acoustic guitar, vocals, harmony vocals
- Gabe Simon – banjo, acoustic guitar/kick drum (Note: The kick drum sound was actually created by Gabe Simon hitting the pickguard of an acoustic guitar.)

== Charts ==
=== Weekly charts ===
Weekly chart performance for "Stick Season"
Chart (2022–2024)	Peak position
Australia (ARIA)	1
Austria (Ö3 Austria Top 40)	32
Belgium (Ultratop 50 Flanders)	1
Canada Hot 100 (Billboard)	3
Canada AC (Billboard)	5
Canada CHR/Top 40 (Billboard)	2
Canada Hot AC (Billboard)	3
Canada Rock (Billboard)	15
Denmark (Tracklisten)	17
Germany (GfK)	44
Global 200 (Billboard)	5
Ireland (IRMA)	1
Latvia Airplay (LaIPA)	10
Netherlands (Dutch Top 40)	1
Netherlands (Single Top 100)	1
New Zealand (Recorded Music NZ)	2
Norway (VG-lista)	11
Poland (Polish Airplay Top 100)	16
Portugal (AFP)	58
South Africa (Billboard)	18
Sweden (Sverigetopplistan)	15
Switzerland (Schweizer Hitparade)	19
UK Country Airplay (Radiomonitor)	11
UK Singles (Official Charts)	1
US Billboard Hot 100	9
US Adult Contemporary (Billboard)	19
US Adult Pop Airplay (Billboard)	1
US Pop Airplay (Billboard)	9
US Hot Rock & Alternative Songs (Billboard)	2
US Rock & Alternative Airplay (Billboard)	16

=== Year-end charts ===
2023 year-end chart performance for "Stick Season"
Chart (2023)	Position
Netherlands (Dutch Top 40)	74
UK Singles (OCC)	60
US Hot Rock & Alternative Songs (Billboard)	47

2024 year-end chart performance for "Stick Season"
Chart (2024)	Position
Australia (ARIA)	4
Belgium (Ultratop Flanders)	6
Canada (Canadian Hot 100)	5
Denmark (Tracklisten)	43
Global 200 (Billboard)	10
Global Singles (IFPI)	10
Iceland (Tónlistinn)	59
Netherlands (Dutch Top 40)	11
Netherlands (Single Top 100)	10
New Zealand (Recorded Music NZ)	8
Portugal (AFP)	114
Sweden (Sverigetopplistan)	54
Switzerland (Schweizer Hitparade)	77
UK Singles (OCC)	1
US Billboard Hot 100	11
US Adult Contemporary (Billboard)	34
US Adult Top 40 (Billboard)	11
US Hot Rock & Alternative Songs (Billboard)	4
US Mainstream Top 40 (Billboard)	30

2025 year-end chart performance for "Stick Season"
Chart (2025)	Position
Australia (ARIA)	69
Belgium (Ultratop 50 Flanders)	184
Global 200 (Billboard)	173
UK Singles (OCC)	33

== Certifications ==
Certifications for "Stick Season"
Region	Certification	Certified units/sales
Australia (ARIA)	10× Platinum	700,000^{‡}
Austria (IFPI Austria)	Platinum	30,000^{‡}
Brazil (Pro-Música Brasil)	Platinum	40,000^{‡}
Canada (Music Canada)	Diamond	800,000^{‡}
Denmark (IFPI Danmark)	Gold	45,000^{‡}
Germany (BVMI)	Gold	300,000^{‡}
Netherlands (NVPI)	Platinum	93,000^{‡}
New Zealand (RMNZ)	6× Platinum	180,000^{‡}
Poland (ZPAV)	Gold	25,000^{‡}
Portugal (AFP)	Platinum	10,000^{‡}
Spain (Promusicae)	Gold	30,000^{‡}
Switzerland (IFPI Switzerland)	Gold	10,000^{‡}
United Kingdom (BPI)	6× Platinum	3,600,000^{‡}
United States (RIAA)	4× Platinum	4,000,000^{‡}
^{‡} Sales+streaming figures based on certification alone.

== Release history ==
Release date and format(s) for "Stick Season"
Region	Date	Format(s)	Label	Ref.
Various	July 8, 2022	Digital download; streaming	Mercury; Republic	
United States	December 5, 2023	Contemporary hit radio	Mercury	

== See also ==
- List of best-selling singles by year in the United Kingdom
- List of highest-certified singles in Australia
