= Homesick (Noah Kahan song) =

Single by Noah Kahan and Sam Fender

from the album Stick Season (Forever)
- Released: January 19, 2024
- Genre: Folk; alternative rock
- Length: 3:14
- Label: Mercury; Republic
- Songwriter: Noah Kahan
- Producers: Gabe Simon; Noah Kahan

Noah Kahan singles chronology
"Everywhere, Everything" (2023)	"Homesick" (2024)	"Forever" (2024)

Sam Fender singles chronology
"Wild Grey Ocean" (2022)	"Homesick" (2024)	"People Watching" (2024)

Music video
- "Homesick" on YouTube

"Homesick" is a song by American singer-songwriter Noah Kahan, included on his Stick Season. Originally a solo composition, he recorded a version with Sam Fender for the digital album Stick Season (Forever), which was released as a single in 2024.

== Charts ==
Chart performance for "Homesick"
Chart (2024)	Peak position
Australia (ARIA)	57
Canada Hot 100 (Billboard)	64
Ireland (IRMA)	4
Netherlands Single Tip (MegaCharts)	16
New Zealand Hot Singles (RMNZ)	4
Sweden Heatseeker (Sverigetopplistan)	19
UK Singles (OCC)	5
US Bubbling Under Hot 100 (Billboard)	20
US Hot Rock & Alternative Songs (Billboard)	18

== Certifications ==
Certifications for "Homesick"
Region	Certification	Certified units/sales
Canada (Music Canada)	Platinum	80,000^{‡}
New Zealand (RMNZ)	Platinum	30,000^{‡}
United Kingdom (BPI) with Sam Fender	Platinum	600,000^{‡}
United States (RIAA)	Gold	500,000^{‡}
^{‡} Sales+streaming figures based on certification alone.
