= Stick Season (album) =

Studio album by Noah Kahan
- Released: October 14, 2022
- Studios: Guilford Sound (Guilford, Vermont); The Study (Nashville)
- Genre: Folk
- Length: 55:21
- Labels: Mercury; Republic
- Producers: Gabe Simon; Noah Kahan

Noah Kahan chronology
I Was / I Am (2021)	Stick Season (2022)	Live from Fenway Park (2024)

Singles from Stick Season
- 1. "Stick Season" Released: July 8, 2022; 2. "Northern Attitude" Released: September 16, 2022; 3. "She Calls Me Back" Released: October 6, 2023; 4. "Everywhere, Everything" Released: December 1, 2023; 5. "Homesick" Released: January 19, 2024

Stick Season is the third studio album by American singer-songwriter Noah Kahan, who also served as producer alongside Gabe Simon. It was released on October 14, 2022, by Mercury Records and Republic Records. The album was supported by two singles: the title track and "Northern Attitude". An expanded edition of the album, titled Stick Season (We'll All Be Here Forever), was released on June 9, 2023, with seven additional tracks, including an extended version of "The View Between Villages".

== Background ==
Kahan began writing the album in his hometown of Strafford, Vermont, in 2020 during the COVID-19 pandemic. Periods of loneliness, burnout from industry pressures, and self-discovery inspired him to distance himself from his previous indie pop sound with a more folk-centric sound, being inspired by Phoebe Bridgers and Sam Fender to incorporate "unprecedented detail" into his writing.

In an interview with WPTZ shortly after the album's release, Kahan described the album as a "love letter to New England".

== Singles ==
On July 8, 2022, the album's title track was released as the lead single. Kahan began teasing the song on social media in the fall of 2020, and it would grow in popularity on TikTok in the two years prior to its official release. The second single "Northern Attitude" was released on September 16, 2022.

On July 18, 2023, Kahan released "Dial Drunk" featuring Post Malone. Kahan described feeling "shock and excitement" that Post wanted to sing on this track and write his own verse.

On September 15, 2023, Kahan released "Call Your Mom" featuring Lizzy McAlpine.

On October 6, 2023, Kahan released "She Calls Me Back" featuring Kacey Musgraves.

On November 10, 2023, Kahan released "Northern Attitude" featuring Hozier.

On December 1, 2023, Kahan released "Everywhere, Everything" featuring Gracie Abrams.

On January 19, 2024, Kahan released "Homesick" featuring Sam Fender.

== Critical reception ==
Professional ratings
Review scores
Source	Rating
AllMusic	3.5/5 stars

Writing for the Associated Press, Elise Ryan wrote that the album's material "feel like songs both longtime listeners and newer fans will want to belt back to Kahan—not because they're produced for stadiums or arenas, but because they're full of nostalgic melodies that will resonate far beyond New England." Marcy Donelson of AllMusic rated the album three-and-a-half out of five stars and described it as a "nostalgic" album that "explores life transitions including leaving home as a young adult, negotiating a pandemic, and getting help for mental health issues." Both reviews noted the album's focus on nostalgia and experiences associated with social and personal transitions.

== Track listing ==
Stick Season track listing
No.	Title	Writer(s)	Length
1.	"Northern Attitude"	Noah Kahan; Gabe Simon	4:27
2.	"Stick Season"	Kahan	3:02
3.	"All My Love"	Kahan	4:11
4.	"She Calls Me Back"	Kahan	4:03
5.	"Come Over"	Kahan	3:17
6.	"New Perspective"	Kahan	4:16
7.	"Everywhere, Everything"	Kahan	4:17
8.	"Orange Juice"	Kahan	4:57
9.	"Strawberry Wine"	Kahan	4:45
10.	"Growing Sideways"	Kahan	4:15
11.	"Halloween"	Kahan; Simon	3:55
12.	"Homesick"	Kahan	3:14
13.	"Still"	Kahan; Iain Archer	3:07
14.	"The View Between Villages"	Kahan; Todd Clark	3:35
Total length:			55:21

Stick Season (We'll All Be Here Forever) extra tracks
No.	Title	Writer(s)	Length
15.	"Your Needs, My Needs"	Kahan; Simon	3:27
16.	"Dial Drunk"	Kahan; Noah Levine	3:33
17.	"Paul Revere"	Kahan	3:33
18.	"No Complaints"	Kahan; Simon; Levine; Carrie Karpinen	3:25
19.	"Call Your Mom"	Kahan; Clark	4:38
20.	"You're Gonna Go Far"	Kahan	4:46
21.	"The View Between Villages" (extended)	Kahan; Clark	4:52
Total length:			83:35

Stick Season (Forever) extra tracks
No.	Title	Writer(s)	Length
22.	"Forever"	Kahan; Simon	4:28
23.	"Dial Drunk" (with Post Malone)	Kahan; Levine; Austin Post	3:34
24.	"Call Your Mom" (with Lizzy McAlpine)	Kahan; Clark	4:39
25.	"She Calls Me Back" (with Kacey Musgraves)	Kahan	4:04
26.	"Northern Attitude" (with Hozier)	Kahan; Simon	4:27
27.	"Everywhere, Everything" (with Gracie Abrams)	Kahan; Simon	4:18
28.	"Homesick" (with Sam Fender)	Kahan; Sam Fender	3:14
29.	"You're Gonna Go Far" (with Brandi Carlile)	Kahan	4:46
30.	"Paul Revere" (with Gregory Alan Isakov)	Kahan	3:33
Total length:			120:38

== Personnel ==
Musicians

- Noah Kahan – vocals, background vocals, guitars (acoustic, electric, rubber bridge, tenor), mandolin
- Gabe Simon – Moog sub bass, organ, piano, whistle, percussion, drums, castanets, background vocals, guitars (acoustic, 12-string, baritone, electric, rubber bridge, bass), banjo, mandolin; mandocello and slide guitar (track 22)
- Konrad Snyder – piano (tracks 1, 26), background vocals (4, 9, 25), claps (8)
- Carrie Karpinen – drums and percussion (tracks 3, 8, 12, 14–24, 28–30), nature sounds (9)
- Phillip Bowen – violin and viola (track 11)
- Noah Levine – lead guitar (track 12); slide guitar (12, 18, 28); baritone guitar (16, 18, 20, 23, 29); acoustic guitar, background vocals, banjo, and electric guitar (16, 23)
- John Mailander – fiddle (tracks 17, 18, 30)
- Hazel Lewis – spoken word (track 21)
- Melvin Coburn – spoken word (track 21)
- Post Malone – lead vocals (track 23)
- Lizzy McAlpine – lead vocals (track 24)
- Kacey Musgraves – lead vocals (track 25)
- Hozier – lead vocals (track 26)
- Aaron Dessner – electric guitar, nylon-string guitar, and piano (track 27)
- Gracie Abrams – lead vocals (track 27)
- Sam Fender – lead vocals and background vocals (track 28)
- Johnny "Bluehat" Davis – tenor saxophone (track 28)
- Brandi Carlile – lead vocals (track 29)
- Gregory Alan Isakov – lead vocals (track 30)

Technical

- Gabe Simon – production
- Noah Kahan – production, creative direction
- Konrad Snyder – engineering (1–15, 17, 19–22, 24–30), mixing (track 5)
- Willie Linton – engineering (track 23)
- Beau Sorenson – engineering (track 27)
- Mark Broughton – engineering (track 28)
- Brandon Bell – engineering (track 29)
- Matt Hall – engineering assistance (tracks 1, 3–15, 17, 19–21, 25–30)
- Louis Remenapp – engineering assistance (tracks 16–18, 20–23)
- Joe Trentacosti – engineering assistance (tracks 22, 29, 30)
- Dean Thompson – engineering assistance (track 28)
- Liam Hebb – engineering assistance (track 28)
- Ryan Hewitt – mixing (tracks 1–4, 6–30), engineering (16–18, 20, 21, 23, 29, 30); immersive mix engineering
- Jordon Silva – mixing assistance (1–4, 6–14, 22, 25–28)
- Maddie Harmon – mixing assistance (tracks 15–21, 23, 24, 29, 30)
- Ted Jensen – mastering
- Dan Rome – vocal production (track 2)
- Todd Clark – vocal production (tracks 14, 21)
- Louis Bell – vocal production (track 23)
- Aaron Dessner – vocal production (track 27)
- Mikey Lavi – creative direction
- Drew Simmons – creative direction
- Patrick McCormack – photography

== Charts ==
=== Weekly charts ===
Weekly chart performance for Stick Season
Chart (2022–2025)	Peak position
Australian Albums (ARIA)	6
Austrian Albums (Ö3 Austria)	57
Belgian Albums (Ultratop Flanders)	7
Canadian Albums (Billboard)	1
Dutch Albums (Album Top 100)	1
German Albums (Offizielle Top 100)	35
Greek Albums (IFPI)	43
Irish Albums (Official Charts)	1
New Zealand Albums (RMNZ)	5
Norwegian Albums (VG-lista)	18
Portuguese Albums (AFP)	35
Scottish Albums (Official Charts)	11
Swedish Albums (Sverigetopplistan)	38
Swiss Albums (Schweizer Hitparade)	52
UK Albums (Official Charts)	1
UK Americana Albums (Official Charts)	1
US Billboard 200	2
US Americana/Folk Albums (Billboard)	1
US Top Rock & Alternative Albums (Billboard)	1

=== Year-end charts ===
2023 year-end chart performance for Stick Season
Chart (2023)	Position
Australian Albums (ARIA)	92
Canadian Albums (Billboard)	38
UK Albums (OCC)	45
US Billboard 200	38
US Folk Albums (Billboard)	4
US Top Rock & Alternative Albums (Billboard)	7

2024 year-end chart performance for Stick Season
Chart (2024)	Position
Australian Albums (ARIA)	17
Belgian Albums (Ultratop Flanders)	52
Canadian Albums (Billboard)	3
Dutch Albums (Album Top 100)	5
Global Albums (IFPI)	9
New Zealand Albums (RMNZ)	9
Swedish Albums (Sverigetopplistan)	63
UK Albums (OCC)	4
US Billboard 200	4
US Folk Albums (Billboard)	1
US Top Rock & Alternative Albums (Billboard)	1

2025 year-end chart performance for Stick Season
Chart (2025)	Position
Australian Albums (ARIA)	31
Belgian Albums (Ultratop Flanders)	50
Canadian Albums (Billboard)	7
Dutch Albums (Album Top 100)	41
Swedish Albums (Sverigetopplistan)	84
UK Albums (OCC)	16
US Billboard 200	16
US Top Rock & Alternative Albums (Billboard)	2

== Certifications ==
Certifications for Stick Season
Region	Certification	Certified units/sales
Australia (ARIA)	Gold	35,000^{‡}
Austria (IFPI Austria)	Gold	7,500^{‡}
Belgium (BRMA)	Platinum	20,000^{‡}
Brazil (Pro-Música Brasil)	Gold	20,000^{‡}
Canada (Music Canada)	7× Platinum	560,000^{‡}
Denmark (IFPI Danmark)	Gold	10,000^{‡}
Netherlands (NVPI)	Gold	18,600^{‡}
New Zealand (RMNZ)	5× Platinum	75,000^{‡}
Portugal (AFP)	Gold	3,500^{‡}
United Kingdom (BPI)	2× Platinum	600,000^{‡}
United States (RIAA)	5× Platinum	5,000,000^{‡}
^{‡} Sales+streaming figures based on certification alone.
