= Dial Drunk =

2023 single by Noah Kahan and Post Malone

Single by Noah Kahan and Post Malone

from the album Stick Season (We'll All Be Here Forever)
- Released: July 17, 2023
- Studio: Curb (Tennessee); Posty (Utah) (Note: Stick Season Forever version only.)
- Length: 3:34
- Label: Mercury; Republic
- Songwriters: Noah Kahan; Noah Levine; Austin Post
- Producers: Kahan; Gabe Simon

Noah Kahan singles chronology
"Northern Attitude" (2022)	"Dial Drunk" (2023)	"Call Your Mom" (2023)

Post Malone singles chronology
"Overdrive" (2023)	"Dial Drunk" (2023)	"Enough Is Enough" (2023)

Lyric video
- "Dial Drunk" on YouTube

Duet version lyric video
- "Dial Drunk" (with Post Malone) on YouTube

"Dial Drunk" is a song by the American singer-songwriter Noah Kahan from the We'll All Be Here Forever edition of his third studio album, Stick Season (2022). It was released through Mercury Records and Republic Records as the third single from the album on July 17, 2023, after a duet version with American musician Post Malone was released the same day. Kahan, Malone, and Noah Levine wrote the song and it was produced by Kahan and Gabe Simon. Musically, "Dial Drunk" combines elements of folk, alternative, and pop.

== Background ==
About collaborating with Malone on the duet version of "Dial Drunk", Kahan said in a press release:

The reaction to "Dial Drunk" has been so incredible and so overwhelming. I never know when or why a song is going to land and to see the meaning and connection you have drawn from this track has inspired me in a way I have never been inspired before. You can only imagine my shock and excitement when Post told me he wanted to not only sing on it, but write his own verse. I have been listening to Post Malone since "White Iverson" dropped, even covering "Congratulations" right when my career was beginning. It feels like a full circle moment, and it has been a dream come true to make this collaboration happen.

== Personnel ==
Personnel taken from Dial Drunk single.

- Noah Kahan – acoustic guitar, vocals, background vocals
- Gabe Simon – background vocals, baritone guitar, bass, organ, percussion
- Carrie K – drums & percussion
- Noah Levine – acoustic guitar, background vocals, banjo, baritone guitar, electric guitar
- Post Malone – vocals (Stick Season Forever version)

== Charts ==
=== Weekly charts ===
Weekly chart performance for "Dial Drunk"
Chart (2023–2024)	Peak position
Australia (ARIA)	45
Canada Hot 100 (Billboard)	10
Canada AC (Billboard)	30
Canada CHR/Top 40 (Billboard)	6
Canada Hot AC (Billboard)	11
Canada Rock (Billboard)	9
Global 200 (Billboard)	39
Ireland (IRMA)	11
Netherlands (Single Tip)	9
New Zealand (Recorded Music NZ)	26
Norway (VG-lista)	33
UK Singles (OCC)	32
US Billboard Hot 100	25
US Adult Contemporary (Billboard)	21
US Adult Pop Airplay (Billboard)	9
US Hot Rock & Alternative Songs (Billboard)	3
US Pop Airplay (Billboard)	18
US Rock & Alternative Airplay (Billboard)	3

=== Year-end charts ===
2023 year-end chart performance for "Dial Drunk"
Chart (2023)	Position
Canada (Canadian Hot 100)	55
US Billboard Hot 100	80
US Hot Rock & Alternative Songs (Billboard)	7
US Rock Airplay (Billboard)	16

2024 year-end chart performance for "Dial Drunk"
Chart (2024)	Position
Canada (Canadian Hot 100)	27
Global 200 (Billboard)	190
UK Singles (OCC)	98
US Adult Top 40 (Billboard)	46
US Hot Rock & Alternative Songs (Billboard)	13

== Certifications ==
Certifications and sales for "Dial Drunk"
Region	Certification	Certified units/sales
Australia (ARIA)	Gold	35,000^{‡}
Brazil (Pro-Música Brasil)	2× Platinum	80,000^{‡}
Canada (Music Canada)	5× Platinum	400,000^{‡}
New Zealand (RMNZ)	Platinum	30,000^{‡}
United Kingdom (BPI)	Platinum	600,000^{‡}
United States (RIAA)	2× Platinum	2,000,000^{‡}
^{‡} Sales+streaming figures based on certification alone.
