= Noah Kahan =

American singer-songwriter (born 1997)

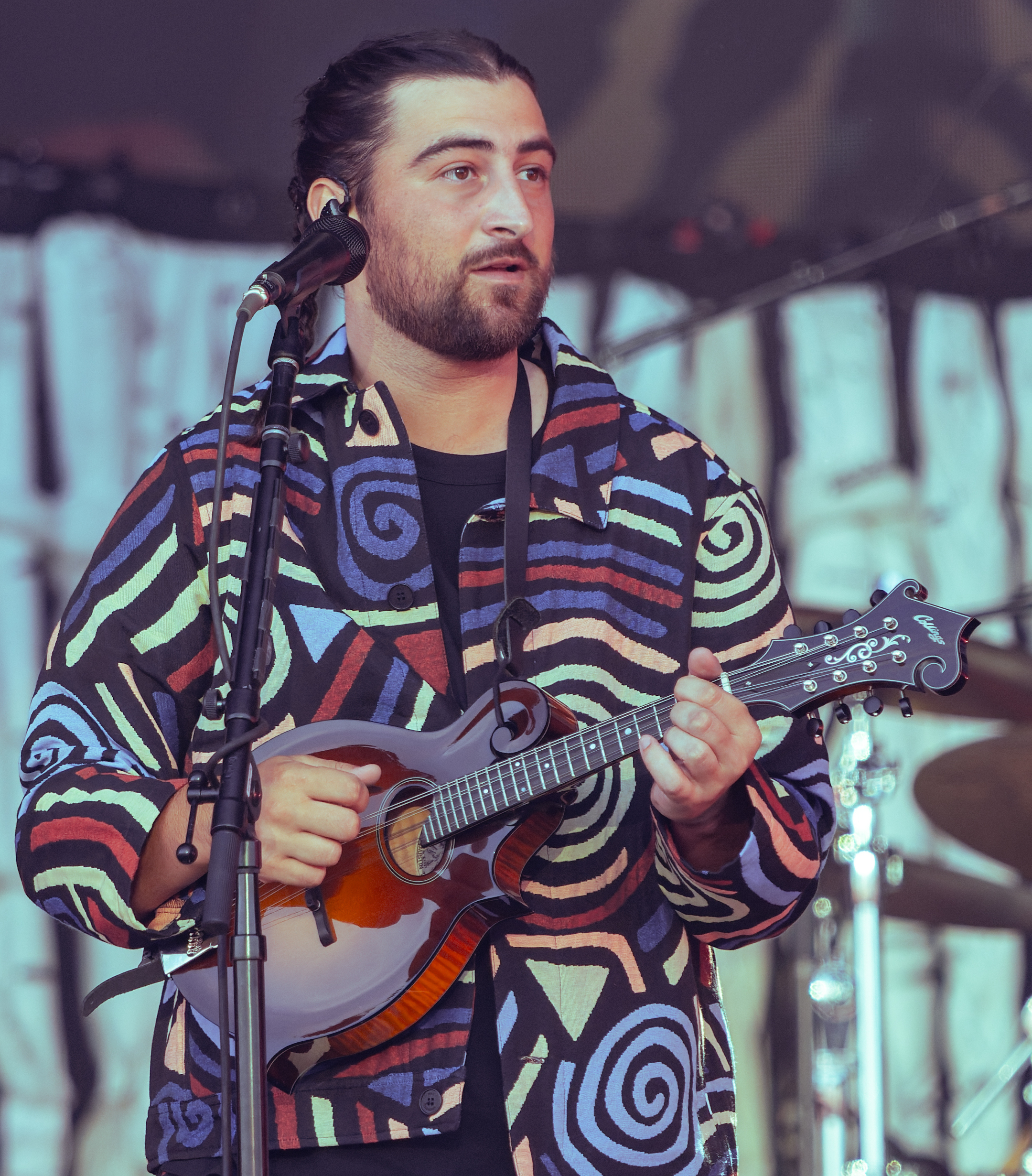
- Kahan performing at the 2025 Glastonbury Festival

Background information
- Born: Noah Berkenkamp Kahan; January 1, 1997 (age 29); Strafford, Vermont, U.S.
- Genres: Folk; pop
- Occupation: Singer-songwriter
- Instruments: Vocals; guitar; mandolin; piano
- Years active: 2017–present
- Labels: Republic; Universal; Mercury
- Spouse: Brenna Nolan (m. 2025)
- Website: noahkahan.com

Noah Berkenkamp Kahan (/kɑːn/ KAHN; born January 1, 1997) is an American singer-songwriter. His breakthrough single, "Hurt Somebody", achieved gold status in the United States and charted in multiple international markets. The single and EP of the same name preceded the release of his debut album, Busyhead (2019). Within five years, two more albums came out: I Was / I Am (2021) and Stick Season (2022), the latter became his mainstream commercial breakthrough. It led to his nomination in 2024 for the Grammy Award for Best New Artist. In 2026, his fourth album The Great Divide was released and achieved record-breaking streaming and vinyl sales for a No. 1 rock album debut on the Billboard 200. That preceded The Great Divide Tour, his first stadium tour, which is set to conclude on July 25, 2027, in London, England.

== Early life ==
Noah Kahan was born in Strafford, Vermont, where he grew up on a tree farm. His father, Josh Kahan, taught him to play guitar while his mother, Lauri Berkenkamp, who wrote parenting guides for a living, taught him to write. His father is Jewish and his mother is Christian. He says that his Jewish roots play a large part in his identity. He is the third of four children.

Noah Kahan began writing songs at age 8, had early lyrics published locally through the Young Writers Project, and received his first guitar at age 10. Around age 12, he fronted his first band, the Bloodthirsties, through Tuck's Rock Dojo. He later began uploading original songs to SoundCloud and YouTube, where his music gained an online following. He attended Hanover High School in Hanover, New Hampshire, where he played varsity soccer.

== Career ==
=== 2017–2021: Busyhead and I Was / I Am ===
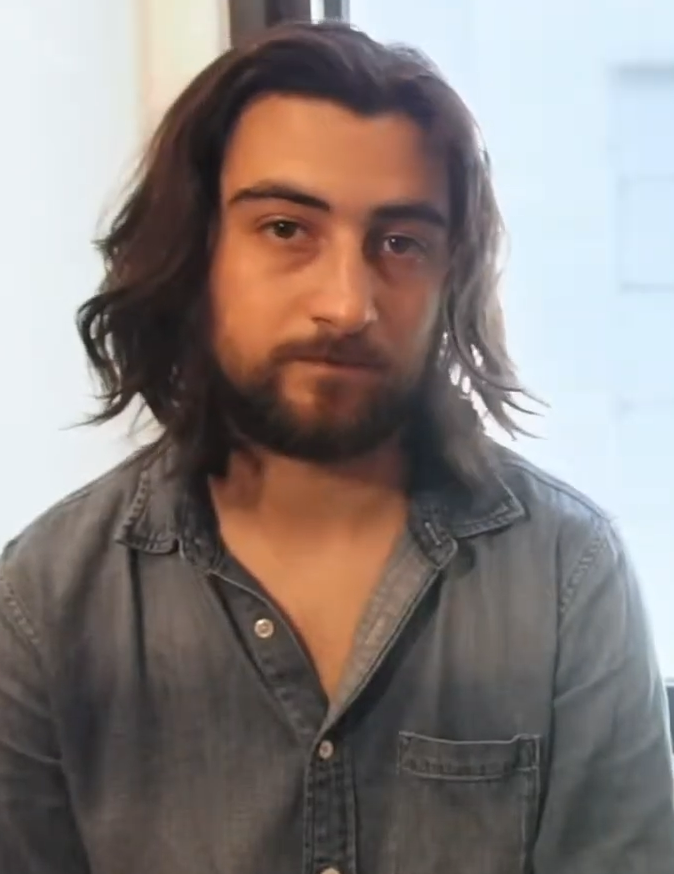
Kahan in 2019

Kahan first went on tour at the age of 19, opening for Milky Chance, a German rock band. In 2017, he signed with Republic Records. He moved to New York City and also spent time in Los Angeles and Nashville. He cites some of his inspirations as being Paul Simon, Yusuf Islam (Cat Stevens), Counting Crows, Hozier, Sam Fender, Mumford & Sons, and Green Day.

In 2018, Kahan was featured on the song "Tough" by Quinn XCII. The song was released on December 11, 2018. In 2019, he released his debut album, Busyhead. The album has the single "Hurt Somebody" featuring Julia Michaels, which peaked at No. 24 on the Billboard Hot Rock chart, marking his first appearance on any U.S. charts. Kahan returned to Vermont at the onset of the COVID-19 pandemic. He set himself a deadline of only one week to write and record his second EP. He was able to finish the EP, Cape Elizabeth, in just six days. It was released in May of 2020. On his TikTok, Kahan admitted in a video that the only song of his that he listens to is "Maine", from this EP. In late 2020, he returned to Los Angeles, where he worked on recording his second album, I Was / I Am. The album was released on September 17, 2021. The album did not have any mainstream hits.

=== 2022–2025: Stick Season and breakthrough ===
In October 2020, Kahan began posting viral TikTok videos showcasing the first verse of what would become the hit single "Stick Season". Over the next two years, he uploaded more snippets of the song and teased other songs from his forthcoming third studio album, leading Stick Season to become viral before it was even released. On July 8, 2022, he finally released the full version of the song to the public. Kahan says "Stick Season" is the kind of song he wanted to write, moving away from his pop heavy projects in the past to a folk centric project. He released the single "Northern Attitude" prior to the album's release.

On October 14, 2022, Kahan released his third studio album, the 14-track Stick Season, which was produced by Gabe Simon. The album debuted at number 14 on the Billboard 200, his first appearance on the chart launching him into mainstream success and helping make him a recognizable figure within the music world. On June 9, 2023, Kahan released a deluxe version of the album titled Stick Season (We'll All Be Here Forever), which features seven additional tracks, including an extended version of the single "The View Between Villages". After the release of Stick Season (We'll All Be Here Forever), he released tracks on the album with added collaborations from other artists beginning with "Dial Drunk" with Post Malone. Additional collaborations include "Call Your Mom", with Lizzy McAlpine; "She Calls Me Back", with Kacey Musgraves; "Northern Attitude", with Hozier; "Everywhere, Everything", with Gracie Abrams; and "Homesick", with Sam Fender.

Kahan also collaborated with country star Zach Bryan on the single "Sarah's Place" from Bryan's Boys of Faith EP. The single peaked at No. 14 on the Billboard Hot 100. Kahan was nominated for Best New Artist at the 66th Annual Grammys Awards, marking his first Grammy nomination. In 2023, he was included as one of Time's TIME100 Next.

On January 5, 2024, "Stick Season" topped the UK Singles Chart marking the first No. 1 of the year and Kahan's first chart topper of his career. In February the single also hit No. 1 on the Australian ARIA Charts. In April 2024, "Stick Season" reached No. 9 on the Billboard Hot 100, the highest position of Kahan's career. In late January, he revealed a final version of the Stick Season album, Stick Season (Forever). Also produced by Simon, the rendition of the album contains all the collaboration projects since the release of Stick Season (We'll All Be Here Forever), including a new track titled "Forever" and two new collaborations on "You're Gonna Go Far" with Brandi Carlile and "Paul Revere" with Gregory Alan Isakov. The expanded album was released on February 9, 2024. Also in 2024, Kahan announced a live album, Live From Fenway Park, which was released on August 30.

Governor Phil Scott of Vermont proclaimed Thursday, September 19, 2024, as "Noah Kahan's Busyhead Project Day" in Vermont. Kahan founded the Busyhead Project as an initiative to provide resources and information to Vermonters struggling with mental health issues. He performed a sold-out benefit concert that night and all proceeds went to Vermont-based mental health organizations. In 2025, Kahan performed at the Glastonbury Festival in Britain.

=== 2026–present: The Great Divide ===
On January 28, 2026, Kahan made a post on his Instagram announcing that he would release an album, The Great Divide, on April 24, 2026. He wrote and recorded The Great Divide in a variety of settings, ranging from "next to a piano in Nashville" to "next to a pond in Guilford, Vermont," as well as "in a legendary studio in upstate New York" and "on a farm with a firetower in Only, Tennessee". On January 30, 2026, Kahan released the title track as the lead single. He released the second leading single, "Porch Light" on March 13, 2026. In May, The Great Divide debuted at No. 1 on the UK Albums Chart, and was in the top position on the Billboard 200 for 3 consecutive weeks.

== Personal life ==
Although they keep a low profile, Kahan has been in a relationship with Brenna Nolan since at least 2014. They got engaged on July 17, 2023, during a trip to Cabo San Lucas, Mexico. They married on August 23, 2025, in a private ceremony in Strafford. Kahan and Nolan lived in several places during their relationship including Nashville and Watertown, Massachusetts. They live in their home state of Vermont.

Kahan has openly discussed his experiences with anxiety, depression, obsessive-compulsive disorder, and body dysmorphia. In a documentary released on Netflix, Noah Kahan: Out of Body, he openly discusses dealing with his mental health. He channels it into the music he writes, often making light of his struggles with jokes on social media and in concert.

== Discography ==
- Busyhead (2019)
- I Was / I Am (2021)
- Stick Season (2022)
- The Great Divide (2026)

== Awards and nominations ==
Year	Organization	Category	Nominated work-	Result	Ref.
2023	Billboard Music Awards	Top Rock Album	Stick Season	Nominated	
2023	Billboard Music Awards	Top Rock Artist	Himself	Nominated	
2024			Himself		
2024	Grammy Awards	Best New Artist	Himself	Nominated	
2024	People's Choice Awards	The New Artist of the Year	Himself	Nominated	
2024	Brit Awards	International Song	"Stick Season"	Nominated	
2024	iHeartRadio Music Awards	Best New Artist (Alternative or Rock)	Himself	Won	
2024	iHeartRadio Music Awards	Best Lyrics	"Dial Drunk"	Nominated	
2024	iHeartRadio Music Awards	Social Star	Himself	Nominated	
2024	Americana Music Honors & Awards	Artist of the Year	Himself	Nominated	
2024	Billboard Music Awards	Top Rock Artist	Himself	Nominated	
2024	Billboard Music Awards	Top Billboard 200 Album	Stick Season	Nominated	
2024	Billboard Music Awards	Top Rock Album	Stick Season	Won	
2024	Billboard Music Awards	Top Rock Song	"Stick Season"	Nominated	
2024	Country Music Association Awards	Musical Event of the Year	"Cowboys Cry Too" with Kelsea Ballerini	Nominated	
2025	Grammy Awards	Best Country Duo/Group Performance	"Cowboys Cry Too" with Kelsea Ballerini	Nominated	
2025	Brit Awards	International Song	"Stick Season"	Nominated	
2026	MTV Video Music Awards	Best Alternative	"The Great Divide"	Nominated	
2027	Grammy Awards	Best Contemporary Folk Album	The Great Divide: The Last of the Bugs	Pending	

== Tours ==
=== Headlining ===
- The Busyhead Tour (2019)
- The I Was / I Am Tour (2021)
- The Stick Season Tour (2022–2023)
- The Stick Season (We'll All Be Here Forever) Tour (2024)
- The Great Divide Tour (2026)
- The Last of the Bugs World Tour (2027)

=== Opening act ===
- Ben Folds and Anderson East (2017)
- Milky Chance (2017)
- The Strumbellas (2017)
- George Ezra – The Staying at Tamara's Tour (2018)
- Dean Lewis (2018–2019)
- James Bay – The Electric Light Tour (2019)
- Dermot Kennedy – The Sonder Tour (2023)
