= Gabe Simon =

American music producer and writer

- Origin: Nashville, Tennessee, U.S.
- Genres: Pop, alternative rock, folk, country
- Occupations: Songwriter, record producer, multi-instrumentalist
- Instruments: Guitar, vocals
- Years active: 2007–present
- Website: www.gabesimonsays.com

Gabe Simon is an American songwriter, record producer, and multi-instrumentalist based in Nashville, Tennessee. He is best known for co-writing and producing Noah Kahan's breakthrough album Stick Season (2022). Simon has additional credits with Koe Wetzel, Lana Del Rey, Dua Lipa, Jessie Murph, Maroon 5, Halsey, Myles Smith and James Bay.

== Early life and education ==
Simon graduated from Belmont University in 2011 with degrees in music business and entrepreneurship. While at Belmont he co-founded the indie-rock band Kopecky (originally the Kopecky Family Band) and served as its frontman, vocalist, and guitarist. The band released Kids Raising Kids (2012) on ATO Records and toured extensively before Simon transitioned into songwriting and production.

== Career ==
After leaving Kopecky, Simon signed a publishing deal with Pulse Music Group in 2015. His early production work included tracks for Dua Lipa's debut era. He rose to prominence through his collaboration with Noah Kahan, serving as executive producer, co-writer, and producer on the 2022 album Stick Season (and its deluxe editions). The project debuted at No. 2 on the Billboard 200, generated multiple platinum singles, and earned Kahan a Grammy nomination for Best New Artist. Simon's contributions placed him at No. 1 on Billboard's Top Rock & Alternative Producer chart. Simon went on to write and produce most of Noah Kahan's most recent album The Great Divide. The album went No. 1 in The US, UK, Canada, Australia, New Zealand, Germany, Netherlands, Switzerland, and Ireland.

He has since produced and co-written for Koe Wetzel's 2024 album 9 Lives, including the single "High Road" (featuring Jessie Murph), which spent five consecutive weeks at No. 1 on the U.S. Country Airplay chart. Simon also contributed to projects by Lana Del Rey (Blue Banisters), Halsey, James Bay, and others. In 2024 Billboard featured him in its "Rising Producers" roundup for his Hot 100 impact, citing credits on hits such as Kahan's "Stick Season" (No. 9 peak), "Northern Attitude," and Koe Wetzel/Jessie Murph collaborations.

In October 2024, Pulse Music Group formed a joint-venture publishing partnership with Simon's company Abide by the Vibe. Simon renewed his exclusive worldwide publishing deal with Pulse at the same time. Simon founded Abide by the Vibe, a non-exclusive co-publishing company. Through the joint venture, Abide by the Vibe publishes writers Nikki Lane, Noah Levine and Sam Westhoff; it also publishes writer/producer Carrie K in partnership with Warner Chappell.

== Selected discography ==
Year	Artist	Title	Role
2015	Dua Lipa	"Begging"	Writer
2015–present	Maroon 5, Hailee Steinfeld feat. Anderson .Paak, Ruel	Various singles and album tracks	Songwriter
2021	Lana Del Rey	Blue Banisters	Producer, co-writer
2021	Lana Del Rey	"Summertime (The Gershwin Version)"	Producer
2022	Noah Kahan	Stick Season (and deluxe editions)	Executive producer, co-writer, producer
2022	Jessie Murph	"Pray"	Producer, co-writer
2023	Noah Kahan	Stick Season (deluxe/live tracks)	Producer, co-writer
2024	Koe Wetzel	9 Lives	Producer, co-writer (incl. "High Road" feat. Jessie Murph)
2024	Halsey	The Great Impersonator	Producer
2024	James Bay	Changes All the Time	Producer, co-writer
2024	Medium Build	Known By None	Writer, producer
2025	Jonas Brothers	Greetings from Your Hometown	Producer, composer
2025	Koe Wetzel	Time Goes On	Producer, composer
2025	Mike Posner	The Beginning	Composer, lyricist
2026	Noah Kahan	The Great Divide	Writer, producer
2026	Koe Wetzel, Ella Langley	"Jaded"	Producer
2026	Koe Wetzel	The Night Champion	Writer, producer
2026	Suki Waterhouse	"Any Man"	Producer
2026	Suki Waterhouse	"Tiny Raisin"	Writer, producer
2026	Myles Smith	"Hold Me In The Dark" "Grandma's Place" "Sertraline"	Writer, producer
2026	Dermot Kennedy	The Weight of the Woods	Writer, producer

Source – AllMusic credits page
