= The Great Divide Tour =

2026–2027 concert tour by Noah Kahan

- Tour by Noah Kahan
- Location: North America; Europe; Oceania
- Associated album: The Great Divide
- Start date: June 11, 2026
- End date: July 25, 2027
- Legs: 5
- No. of shows: 88
- Supporting acts: Gigi Perez; Annabelle Dinda; Michael Marcagi; Bella Kay; Mon Rovîa

Noah Kahan concert chronology
- The Stick Season (We'll All Be Here Forever) Tour (2024); The Great Divide Tour (2026–2027)

The Great Divide Tour is the ongoing fifth concert tour by singer-songwriter Noah Kahan. The tour began on June 11, 2026 in Orlando, Florida, and is set to conclude on July 25, 2027 in London, England.

== Background ==
On February 2, 2026, Noah Kahan officially announced The Great Divide Tour, a North American stadium and arena tour in support of his forthcoming fourth studio album, The Great Divide (2026). The announcement followed the release and Grammy-stage premiere of the album’s title track and music video, which debuted during a 2026 Grammy Awards commercial break in partnership with Mastercard. The tour marks one of the largest headline runs of Kahan’s career, with performances primarily at major outdoor stadiums, ballparks, and arenas across the United States and Canada from June through August 2026. Continuing then through December 7, 2026 Kahan will continue onto a comprehensive international schedule covering Australia, New Zealand, and several European nations.

Special guest Gigi Perez is set to join Kahan throughout the North American leg, supporting him on most dates. For the international leg, Kahan is joined by Michael Marcagi in Oceania, Bella Kay in the United Kingdom and Ireland, and Mon Rovîa for the mainland European performances. Tickets for The Great Divide Tour were made available first through an artist presale on Tuesday, February 10, 2026. The general public onsale began on Thursday, February 12, 2026, following which, Kahan added more dates due to demand. He also announced that Annabelle Dinda would be opening alongside Perez throughout the tour. On April 9, 2026, Kahan announced the Oceania and Europe dates for the tour.

Besides the tour's official run, several North American and European dates were revealed on October 29, 2026. The all-stadium shows were billed as The Last of the Bugs World Tour, corresponding with the deluxe version of "The Great Divide". Due to high demand, Kahan is rescheduled to perform a record-breaking ten dates at Fenway Park in Boston.

== Setlist ==
This setlist was taken from the show in Orlando on June 11, 2026. It does not represent all shows throughout the tour.

Main stage

1. "American Cars"
2. "Doors"
3. "All My Love"
4. "Deny Deny Deny"
5. "Everywhere, Everything"

B stage

6. "Haircut"
7. "Downfall"

Main stage

8. "She Calls Me Back"
9. "Dashboard"
10. "Dial Drunk"
11. "We Go Way Back"
12. "Porch Light"

C stage

13. "Orbiter"
14. "Paid Time Off"
15. "The View Between Villages"

Main stage

16. "Northern Attitude"
17. "The Great Divide"
18. "Orange Juice"
19. "New Perspective"

Encore

20. "End of August"
21. "Homesick"
22. "Stick Season"

=== Alterations ===
- At the June 12 show in Orlando, "Staying Still" was performed in place of "Everywhere, Everything", "Willing and Able" was performed in place of "We Go Way Back", "Maine" was performed after "Orbiter", and "Dan" was performed after "Paid Time Off".
- At the June 26 show in Philadelphia, "Staying Still" and "Willing and Able" were performed, and "All Them Horses" was performed after "Paid Time Off".
- At the June 28 show in Toronto, "Staying Still", "Willing and Able", and "All Them Horses" were performed, and "Everywhere, Everything" was performed after "Orbiter".
- At the July 1 show in Cincinnati, "Staying Still", "Maine", and "Dan" were performed.
- At the July 3 show in Pittsburgh, "Staying Still", "Willing and Able", "Maine", and "All Them Horses" were performed.
- At the July 7 show in Boston, "Staying Still", "Willing and Able", "Maine", "All Them Horses" were performed, and "Paul Revere" was performed after "Downfall".
- At the July 8 show in Boston, "Staying Still" and "Maine" were performed, "Mess" was played after "Downfall", and "Lighthouse" was performed after "Paid Time Off".
- At the July 10 show in Boston, "Staying Still" was performed, "False Confidence" and "Headed North" were added to the setlist, and "Godlight" was performed after "Orbiter".
- At the July 11 show in Boston, "Staying Still", "Willing and Able", and "Dan" were performed, "Forever" was performed after "Downfall", "23" was performed after "Orbiter", and "Carlo's Song" was performed in place of "Orange Juice".
- At the July 14 show in Chicago, "Staying Still", "Willing and Able", and "Dan" were played, and "Call Your Mom" was performed after "Orbiter".
- At the July 15 show in Chicago, "Staying Still" and "Willing and Able" were performed, and "Growing Sideways" was performed after "Orbiter". Kahan performed a mashup of unreleased song "Pain is Cold Water" and "Maine" after "Paid Time Off".
- At the July 19 show in Queens, "Staying Still", "Willing and Able", "Dan", "Paid is Cold Water", and "Maine" were performed, and "Strawberry Wine" was performed after "Orbiter".
- At the July 22 show in Washington D.C., "Willing and Able" and "All Them Horses". "Please" was performed after "Orbiter".
- At the July 25 show in Raleigh, "Staying Still", "Willing and Able", "Pain is Cold Water", "Maine", and "Dan" were performed. "Howling" was performed after "Orbiter".

=== Notes ===
- At all four shows in Boston, "She Calls Me Back" was performed with Gigi Perez.
- At the July 7 show in Boston, Drake Maye made an appearance on stage through a video call on the screen.
- At the July 8 show in Boston, David Ortiz made an appearance on stage through a video call on the screen.
- At the July 10 show in Boston, Rob Gronkowski made an appearance on stage through a video call on the screen.
- At the July 11 show in Boston, Kahan's mom made an appearance on stage through a video call on the screen to reveal he had been added to the Fenway Hall of Fame.
- At the July 19 show in Queens, Kahan performed "End of August" with Aaron Dessner. Elmo and Cookie Monster also made an appearance on stage through a video call.
- At the July 25 show in Raleigh, "She Calls Me Back" was performed with Perez.

== Tour dates ==
The Great Divide Tour dates
Date (2026)	City	Country	Venue	Opening act(s)	Attendance
June 11	Orlando	United States	Kia Center	Gigi Perez	26,684 / 26,684
June 12	Orlando	United States	Kia Center	Gigi Perez	26,684 / 26,684
June 14 (Note: This concert is a part of Bonnaroo.)	Manchester	United States	Great Stage Park	—N/a	—N/a
June 26	Philadelphia	United States	Citizens Bank Park	Gigi Perez; Annabelle Dinda	48,206 / 48,206
June 28	Toronto	Canada	Rogers Stadium	Gigi Perez; Annabelle Dinda	53,506 / 53,506
July 1	Cincinnati	United States	Great American Ball Park	Gigi Perez; Annabelle Dinda	42,709 / 42,709
July 3	Pittsburgh	United States	PNC Park	Gigi Perez; Annabelle Dinda	42,633 / 42,633
July 7	Boston	United States	Fenway Park	Gigi Perez; Annabelle Dinda	150,000 / 150,000
July 8	Boston	United States	Fenway Park	Gigi Perez; Annabelle Dinda	150,000 / 150,000
July 10	Boston	United States	Fenway Park	Gigi Perez; Annabelle Dinda	150,000 / 150,000
July 11	Boston	United States	Fenway Park	Gigi Perez; Annabelle Dinda	150,000 / 150,000
July 14	Chicago	United States	Wrigley Field	Gigi Perez; Annabelle Dinda	80,000 / 80,000
July 15	Chicago	United States	Wrigley Field	Gigi Perez; Annabelle Dinda	80,000 / 80,000
July 19	New York City (Note: Promoted as Queens)	United States	Citi Field	Gigi Perez; Annabelle Dinda	44,500 / 44,500
July 22	Washington, D.C.	United States	Nationals Park	Gigi Perez; Annabelle Dinda	40,000 / 40,000
July 25	Raleigh	United States	Carter–Finley Stadium	Gigi Perez; Annabelle Dinda	50,000 / 50,000
July 27	Cumberland (Note: Promoted as Atlanta)	United States	Truist Park	Gigi Perez; Annabelle Dinda	40,000 / 40,000
July 30	Arlington	United States	Globe Life Field	Gigi Perez; Annabelle Dinda	40,000 / 40,000
August 2	St. Louis	United States	Busch Stadium	Gigi Perez; Annabelle Dinda	—
August 5	Minneapolis	United States	Target Field	Gigi Perez; Annabelle Dinda	38,000 / 38,000
August 8	Denver	United States	Coors Field	Gigi Perez; Annabelle Dinda	100,000 / 100,000
August 9	Denver	United States	Coors Field	Gigi Perez; Annabelle Dinda	100,000 / 100,000
August 15	Pasadena	United States	Rose Bowl	Gigi Perez; Annabelle Dinda	56,000 / 56,000
August 17	San Diego	United States	Petco Park	Gigi Perez; Annabelle Dinda	40,000 / 40,000
August 19	Phoenix	United States	Chase Field	Gigi Perez; Annabelle Dinda	50,000 / 50,000
August 21	San Francisco	United States	Oracle Park	Gigi Perez; Annabelle Dinda	40,000 / 40,000
August 25	Sandy	United States	America First Field	Gigi Perez; Annabelle Dinda	20,000 / 20,000
August 28	Vancouver	Canada	BC Place	Gigi Perez; Annabelle Dinda	65,000 / 65,000
August 30	Seattle	United States	T-Mobile Park	Gigi Perez; Annabelle Dinda	86,000 / 86,000
August 31	Seattle	United States	T-Mobile Park	Gigi Perez; Annabelle Dinda	86,000 / 86,000
September 25	Melbourne	Australia	Rod Laver Arena	Michael Marcagi	55,000 / 55,000
September 26	Melbourne	Australia	Rod Laver Arena	Michael Marcagi	55,000 / 55,000
September 28	Melbourne	Australia	Rod Laver Arena	Michael Marcagi	55,000 / 55,000
September 29	Melbourne	Australia	Rod Laver Arena	Michael Marcagi	55,000 / 55,000
October 2	Sydney	Australia	Afterpay Arena	Michael Marcagi	—
October 3	Sydney	Australia	Afterpay Arena	Michael Marcagi	—
October 5	Sydney	Australia	Afterpay Arena	Michael Marcagi	—
October 6	Sydney	Australia	Afterpay Arena	Michael Marcagi	—
October 9	Auckland	New Zealand	Spark Arena	Michael Marcagi	—
October 10	Auckland	New Zealand	Spark Arena	Michael Marcagi	—
November 5	Glasgow	Scotland	OVO Hydro	Bella Kay	—
November 6	Glasgow	Scotland	OVO Hydro	Bella Kay	—
November 9	Manchester	England	AO Arena	Bella Kay	—
November 10	Manchester	England	AO Arena	Bella Kay	—
November 13	London	England	The O_{2} Arena	Bella Kay	—
November 14	London	England	The O_{2} Arena	Bella Kay	—
November 17	London	England	The O_{2} Arena	Bella Kay	—
November 21	Dublin	Ireland	3Arena	Bella Kay	—
November 22	Dublin	Ireland	3Arena	Bella Kay	—
November 25	Zürich	Switzerland	Hallenstadion	Mon Rovîa	—
November 26	Cologne	Germany	Lanxess Arena	Mon Rovîa	—
November 28	Copenhagen	Denmark	Royal Arena	Mon Rovîa	—
November 29	Stockholm	Sweden	Avicii Arena	Mon Rovîa	—
December 1	Amsterdam	Netherlands	Ziggo Dome	Mon Rovîa	—
December 2	Amsterdam	Netherlands	Ziggo Dome	Mon Rovîa	—
December 4	Munich	Germany	Olympiahalle	Mon Rovîa	—
December 7	Paris	France	Accor Arena	Mon Rovîa	—

The Last of the Bugs World Tour dates
Date (2027)	City	Country	Venue	Opening act	Attendance	Revenue
April 24	Athens	United States	Sanford Stadium	—	—	—
April 27	Birmingham	United States	Protective Stadium	—	—	—
April 29	Tampa	United States	Raymond James Stadium	—	—	—
May 4	Nashville	United States	Nissan Stadium	—	—	—
May 6	Charlotte	United States	Bank of America Stadium	—	—	—
May 9	Norman	United States	Gaylord Family Oklahoma Memorial Stadium	—	—	—
May 12	Houston	United States	Reliant Stadium	—	—	—
May 15	Austin	United States	Darrell K Royal–Texas Memorial Stadium	—	—	—
May 19	Santa Clara (Note: Promoted as San Francisco)	United States	Levi's Stadium	—	—	—
May 21	Paradise (Note: Promoted as Las Vegas)	United States	Allegiant Stadium	—	—	—
May 26	Madison	United States	Camp Randall Stadium	—	—	—
May 29	Boston	United States	Fenway Park	—	—	—
May 30	Boston	United States	Fenway Park	—	—	—
June 1	Boston	United States	Fenway Park	—	—	—
June 2	Boston	United States	Fenway Park	—	—	—
June 5	Columbus	United States	Ohio Stadium	—	—	—
June 9	Detroit	United States	Ford Field	—	—	—
June 10	Detroit	United States	Ford Field	—	—	—
June 12	Orchard Park (Note: Promoted as Buffalo)	United States	Highmark Stadium	—	—	—
June 15	Montreal	Canada	Jean-Drapeau Park	—	—	—
June 18	East Rutherford	United States	MetLife Stadium	—	—	—
June 19	East Rutherford	United States	MetLife Stadium	—	—	—
June 21	Boston	United States	Fenway Park	—	—	—
June 22	Boston	United States	Fenway Park	—	—	—
July 1	Groningen	Netherlands	Stadspark	—	—	—
July 2	Berlin	Germany	Waldbühne	—	—	—
July 4	Milan	Italy	Ippodromo San Siro Milano	—	—	—
July 7	Seville	Spain	Plaza de España	—	—	—
July 10	Paris	France	Longchamp Racecourse	—	—	—
July 13	Glasgow	Scotland	Hampden Park	—	—	—
July 17	Dublin	Ireland	Aviva Stadium	—	—	—
July 18	Dublin	Ireland	Aviva Stadium	—	—	—
July 23	London	England	Wembley Stadium	—	—	—
July 24	London	England	Wembley Stadium	—	—	—
July 25	London	England	Wembley Stadium	—	—	—
Total					—	—

=== Canceled concerts ===
List of canceled concerts
Date (2026)	City	Country	Venue	Reason	Ref.
July 18	New York City	United States	Citi Field	Inclement weather conditions	
