= Busch Stadium =

Baseball stadium in St. Louis, Missouri, US

- Busch Stadium III; Baseball Heaven

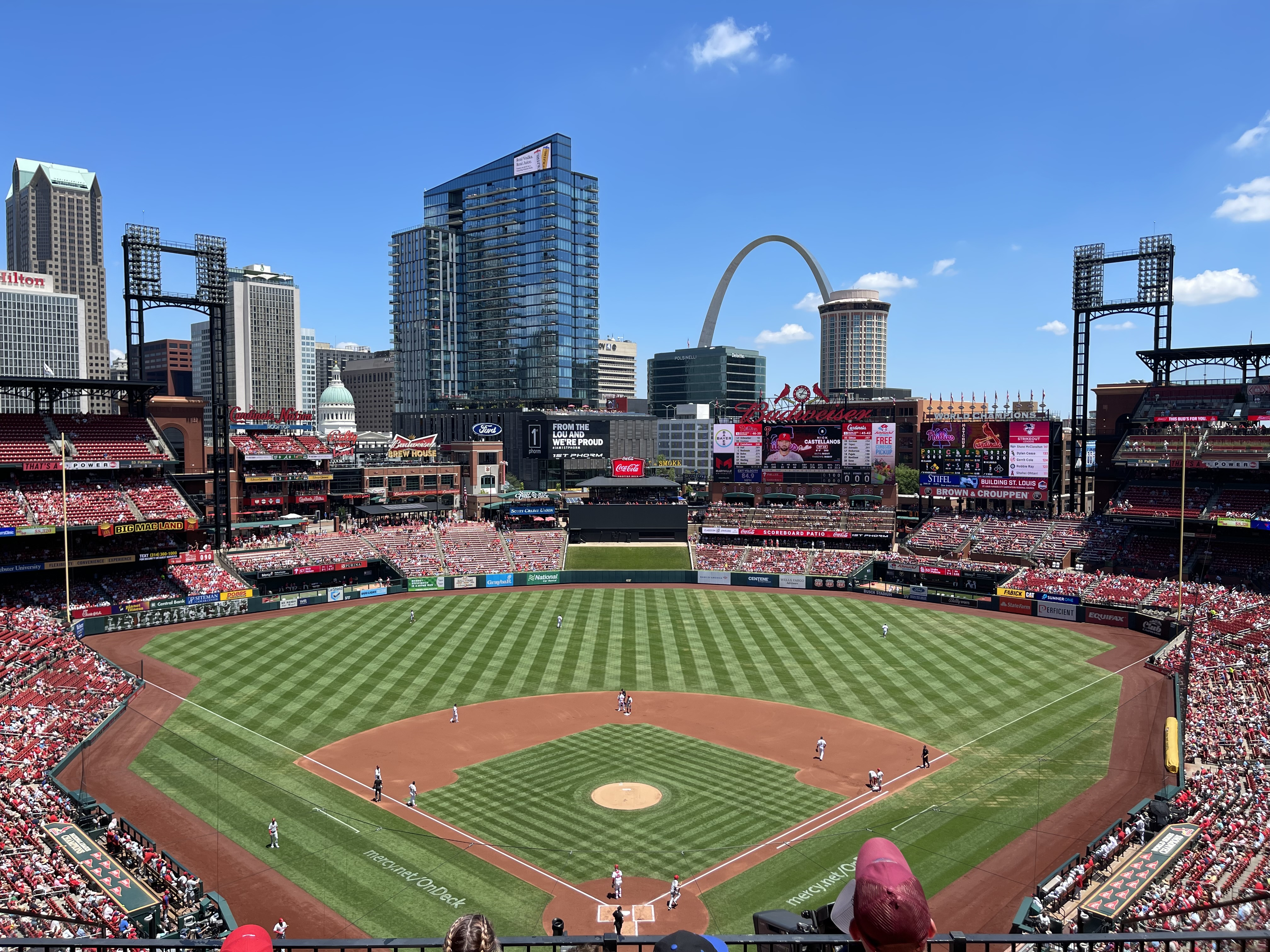
- Busch Stadium in 2022

- Location in Missouri Location in the United States
- Address: 700 Clark Ave
- Location: St. Louis, Missouri, U.S.
- Coordinates: 38°37′21″N 90°11′35″W
- Owner: St. Louis Cardinals
- Operator: St. Louis Cardinals
- Capacity: 44,383 (since 2020) 44,494 (2018–2019); 45,529 (2017); 45,538 (2016); 45,399 (2014–2015); 43,975 (2006–2013) 47,514 (with standing room)
- Surface: Bermuda Grass
- Record attendance: Soccer: 48,263 Chelsea vs Manchester City (3–4); Baseball: 48,581 (August 6, 2022) Cardinals vs New York Yankees; Hockey: 46,556 (January 2, 2017) St. Louis Blues vs Chicago Blackhawks: 2017 NHL Winter Classic; Concert: U2's U2 360° Tour 52,273 (largest non-sporting event)
- Field size: Left field — 336 feet (102 m); Left center field — 375 feet (114 m); Center field — 400 feet (122 m); Right center field — 375 feet (114 m); Right field — 335 feet (102 m)
- Public transit: Red Blue; At Stadium

Construction
- Groundbreaking: January 17, 2004
- Opened: April 4, 2006 (MiLB exhibition); April 10, 2006 (MLB)
- Cost: $365 million ($583 million in 2025 dollars)
- Architects: HOK Sport; Kennedy Associates/Architects Inc.
- Project manager: Clayco Corp.
- Structural engineers: Bliss & Nyitray, Inc
- Services engineers: M-E Engineers, Inc.
- General contractor: Hunt/Kwame

Tenant
- St. Louis Cardinals (MLB) (2006–present)

Website
- mlb.com/cardinals/ballpark

Busch Stadium (also referred to informally as "New Busch Stadium" or "Busch Stadium III") is a baseball stadium located in St. Louis, Missouri, United States. It is the home of Major League Baseball's St. Louis Cardinals. It has a seating capacity of 44,383, with 3,706 club seats and 61 luxury suites. It replaced Busch Memorial Stadium (aka Busch Stadium II) and occupies a portion of that stadium's former footprint. A commercial area dubbed Ballpark Village was built adjacent to the stadium over the remainder of the former stadium's footprint.

The stadium opened on April 4, 2006, with an exhibition between the minor league Memphis Redbirds and Springfield Cardinals (both affiliates of the St. Louis Cardinals), which Springfield won 5–3 with right-hander Mike Parisi recording the first win. The first major league game occurred on April 10, 2006, as the Cardinals defeated the Milwaukee Brewers 6–4 behind an Albert Pujols home run and winning pitcher Mark Mulder.

In 2004, then-Anheuser-Busch president August Busch IV announced that the brewing giant had purchased 20-year naming rights for the stadium. Team owner William DeWitt Jr. said: "From the day we began planning for the new ballpark, we wanted to keep the name 'Busch Stadium.' August Busch IV and Anheuser-Busch share our vision for continuing that tradition for our great fans and the entire St. Louis community."

It is the third stadium in St. Louis to carry the name Busch Stadium. Sportsman's Park was renamed Busch Stadium in 1953; then-team owner August Busch Jr. had planned to name it Budweiser Stadium, but at the time league rules prohibited naming a venue after an alcoholic beverage. Busch named the stadium after himself, and the Anheuser-Busch corporation later introduced Busch Beer. The first Busch Stadium closed in 1966 and both the baseball Cardinals, and the National Football League (NFL)'s team of the same name (later the Arizona Cardinals) moved to a new multi-purpose stadium, named Busch Memorial Stadium (Busch Stadium II).

== History ==
=== Planning ===
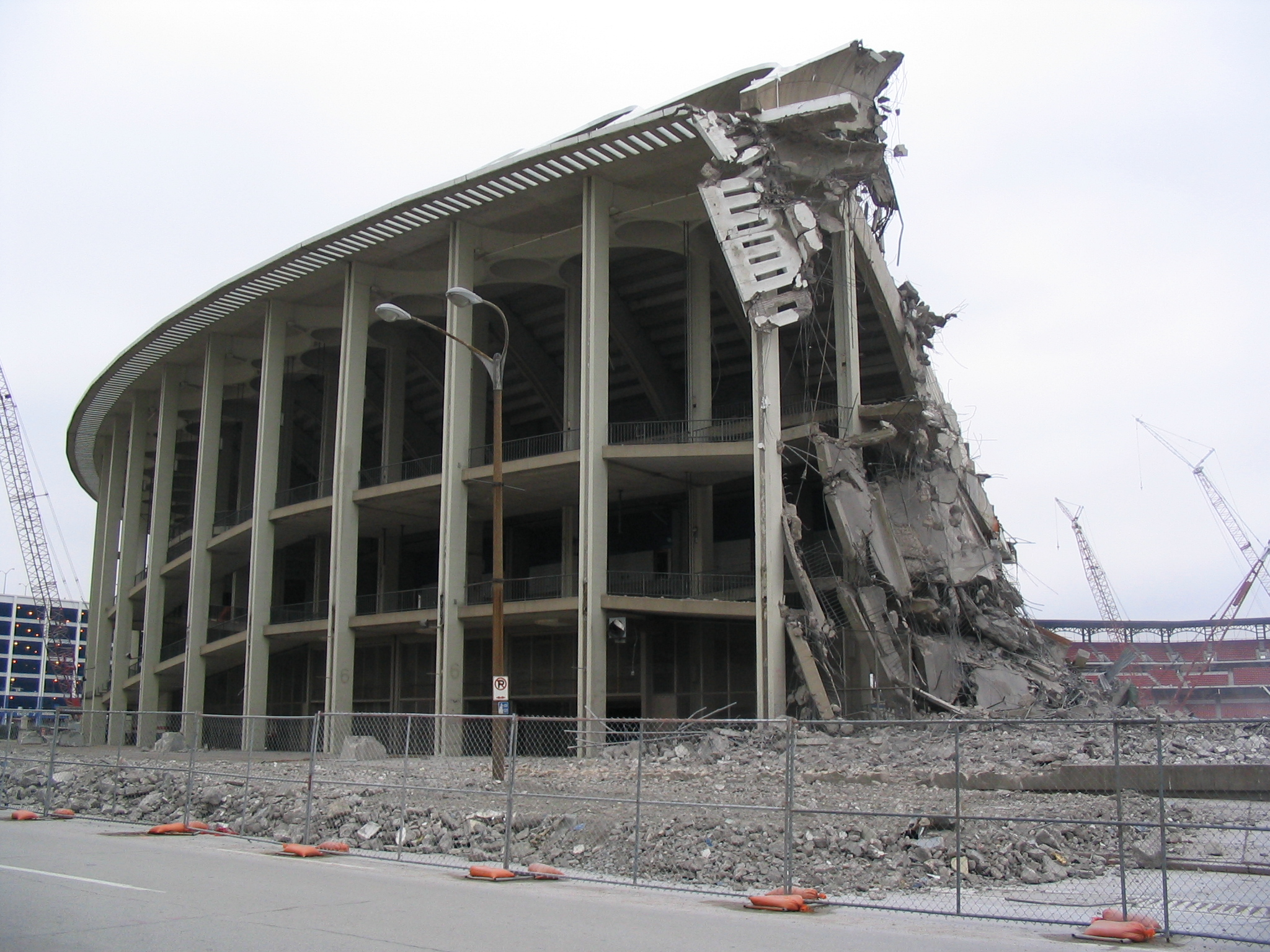
Busch Stadium II in the process of being torn down.

In 1995, St. Louis Cardinals team ownership began to lobby for a new ballpark in downtown St. Louis, but the team was unable to acquire funding for the project for several years. In June 2001, the Missouri state government signed a contract with the team, proposing a ballpark in downtown St. Louis, but a subsequent funding bill was struck down in May 2002, leaving the saga open. Team owners sought a location near Madison, Illinois, adjacent to Gateway International Raceway, until the city of St. Louis drafted a financing plan for the team to construct the new stadium in downtown St. Louis. The stadium was financed through private bonds, bank loans, a long-term loan from St. Louis County, and money from the team owners. The development, including the Ballpark Village was projected to cost approximately $665 million with the stadium alone costing $365 million.

=== Construction and opening ===
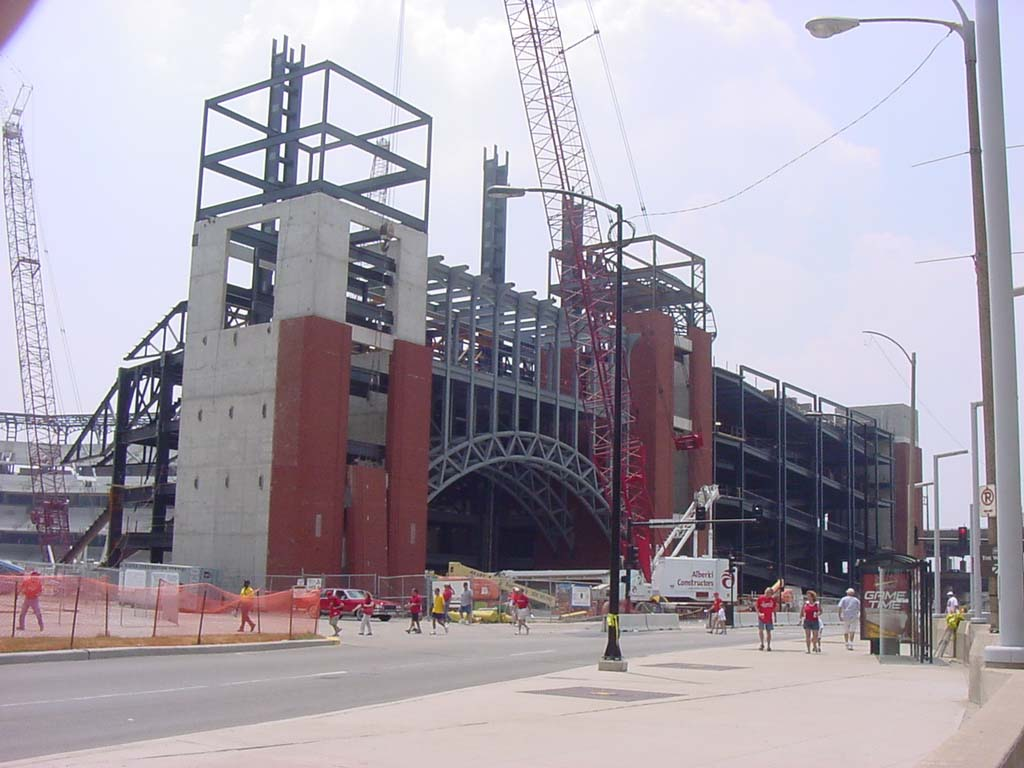
Busch Stadium under construction

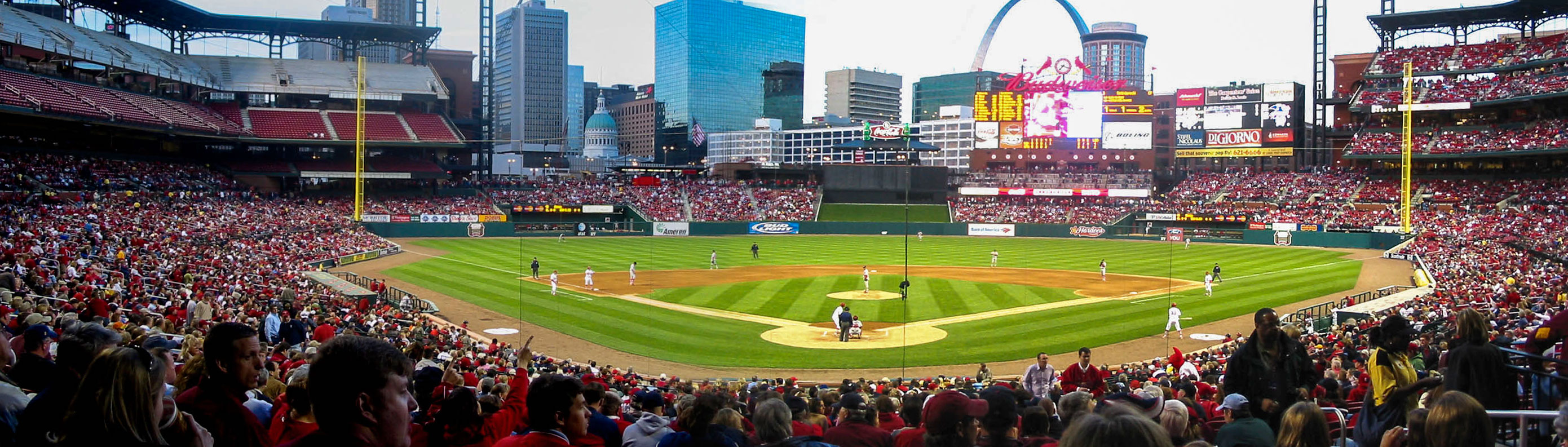
1st game at new Busch featured Cardinal Minor League clubs. Notice the left field seats not yet complete.

New Busch Stadium was designed by Populous (then known as HOK Sport) and built by Hunt Construction with an estimated cost of $344.8 million, which proved too low by $20.2 million to its final cost of $365 million. Populous' senior project designer for Busch Stadium was Jim Chibnall, who was also the lead designer of Progressive Field in Cleveland, Heinz Field in Pittsburgh, Sydney Olympic Stadium, and other notable stadiums throughout the world.

The field level (16,880 seats), terrace level (9,150), and bleachers (3,661) were completed in time for opening day, with total capacity on that day of 37,962, not including up to 2,751 standing room tickets. An integrated LED video and scoring system from Daktronics was installed in the stadium prior to its opening, featuring a video display measuring 32 feet (9.8 m) high by 52 feet (16 m) wide and three message displays, as well as more than 100 feet (30 m) of digital ribbon board technology.

Construction on the seating area was completed in late May increasing the capacity for the May 29, 2006 game vs the Houston Astros with finishing touches performed throughout the year. Including all 2,886 standing-room-only tickets for the general public, as well as suites and party rooms, the stadium's total capacity is 46,861. Natural grass turf was installed in March 2006.

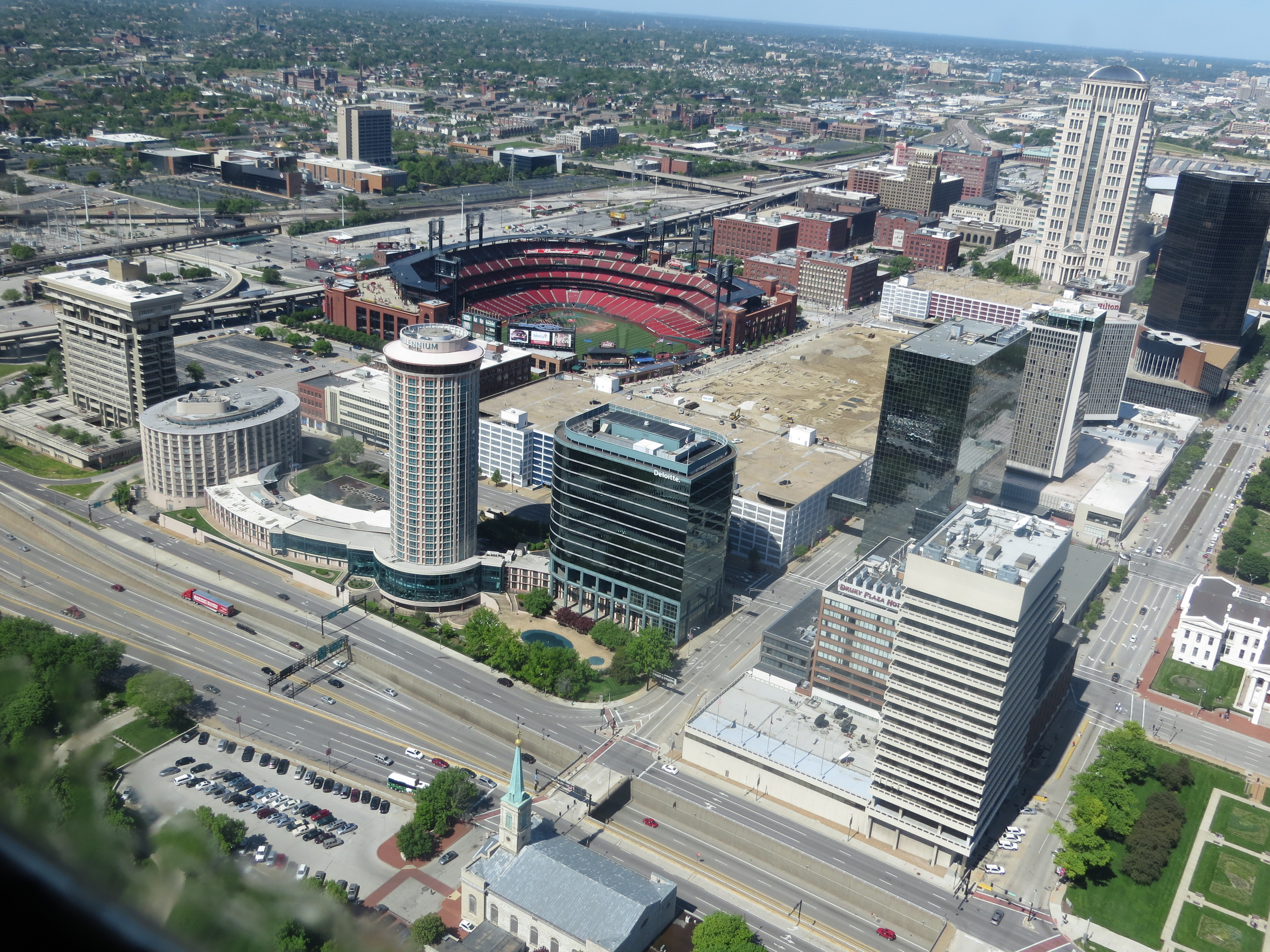
Busch Stadium as seen from the top of the Gateway Arch in May 2013.

== Notable baseball events ==
In the stadium's debut season every Cardinal game was sold out, giving a total attendance of 3,407,104 for the season, the second-largest in team history, but since surpassed in 2007, 2008, and from 2014 to 2017.

The largest attendance for a baseball game occurred August 6, 2022, when 48,581 fans watched a game between the Cardinals and the New York Yankees, a 1-0 Cardinals victory.

=== Playoffs ===
==== 2006 ====
In the first season of the new stadium, the Cardinals hosted the San Diego Padres in Games 3 and 4 of the National League Division Series. In Game 3 on October 7, San Diego defeated St. Louis 3–1. The Cardinals won the next night by the score of 6–2, clinching the series win. In the 2006 National League Championship Series the Cardinals hosted the New York Mets in Games 3, 4, and 5. St. Louis won Game 3 and Game 5, and eventually clinched their 17th National League pennant by defeating the Mets on the road in Game 7, 3–1.

The Cardinals faced the Detroit Tigers in the 2006 World Series. This was the third meeting between the two ballclubs in the Fall Classic, and the first in 38 years. The Cardinals won the first in 1934, and the Tigers won the second in 1968; each went the full seven games. Because the American League won that year's All-Star Game, the Tigers were granted home field advantage, meaning the Cardinals would host Games 3, 4, and 5. This proved fortuitous for St. Louis, as they won every game at home, clinching their 10th World Series championship in Game 5 on October 27, by the score of 4–2.

==== 2009 ====
Busch Stadium hosted only one postseason game in 2009, a 5–1 loss versus the Los Angeles Dodgers on October 10, to complete a sweep of the Cardinals.

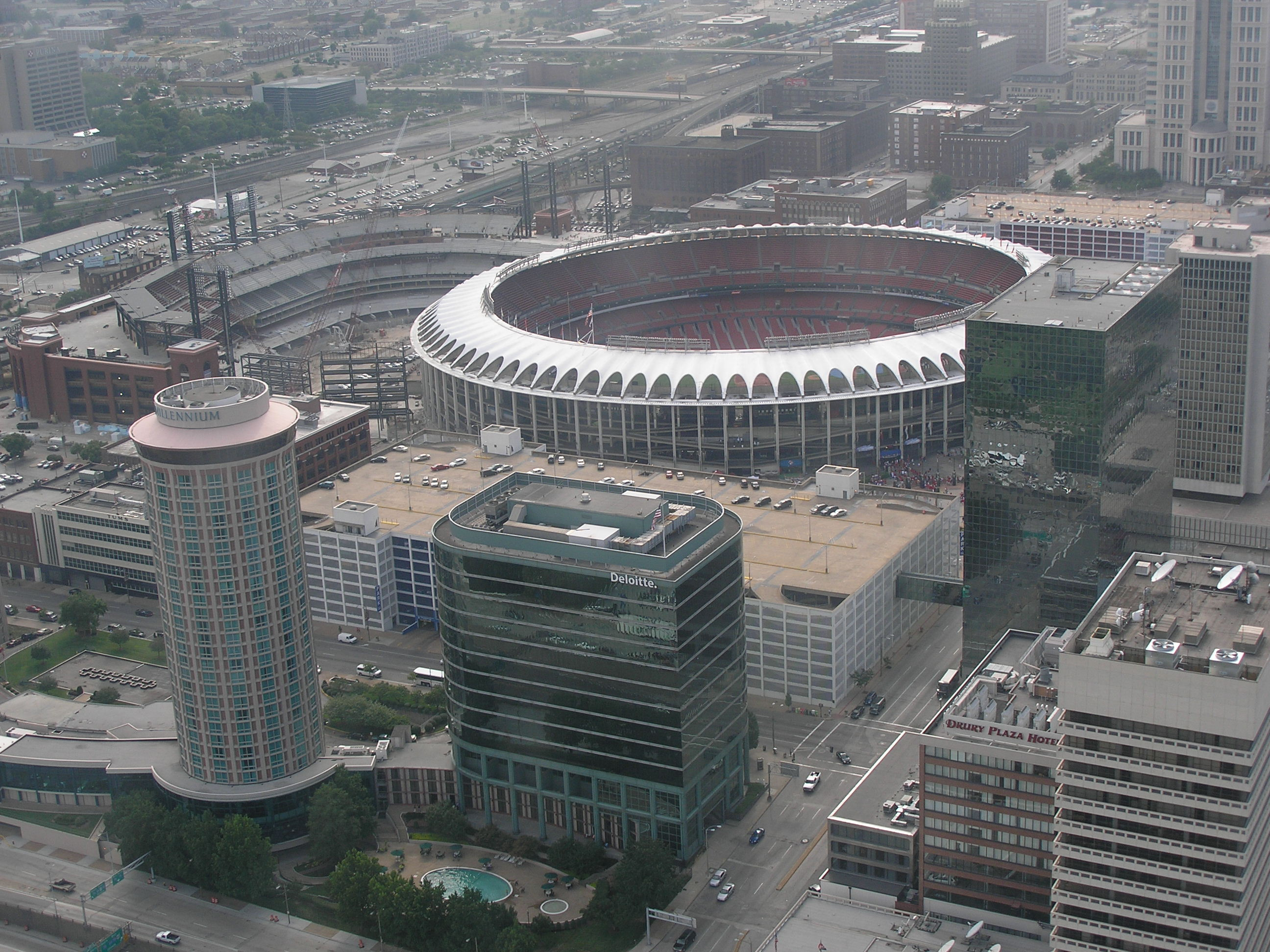
New and old Busch Stadiums

==== 2011 ====
In 2011, Busch Stadium hosted two postseason games in the National League Division Series versus the Philadelphia Phillies. On October 4, the Phillies won 3–2, to take a 2–1 series lead over the Cardinals. The next night, the 5th, the Cardinals beat the Phillies 5–3 to tie the series at 2 games apiece. In the NLCS versus the Milwaukee Brewers, the Cardinals won 2 of the three games they played at home (Games 3, 4, 5). The Cards ended up winning the series on the road in Milwaukee to advance to the World Series. (This was the second time the Cardinals had defeated the Brewers in a postseason series, the first being the 1982 World Series, when Milwaukee was represented as an American League team; the Brewers switched over to the National League in 1998.)

Because the National League had won the 2011 MLB All-Star Game, home field advantage went to the Cardinals as the National League champions, thus allowing the team to host the Texas Rangers for Games 1, 2, 6 and 7. Game 1 was won by the Cardinals on October 19, along with Game 6 on October 27, in a game won in walk-off fashion by a David Freese home run, then the deciding Game 7, which was taken by the Cardinals in a 6–2 final, giving the team the 2011 World Series title.

==== 2012 ====
Busch Stadium hosted two postseason games vs. the Washington Nationals in the 2012 National League Division Series. The two teams split the two games at Busch, before the Cardinals won two of the next three games at Nationals Park. The Cardinals then won the first two home games against the San Francisco Giants to take a 3–1 series lead, but lost Game 5 and went on to lose the series in Game 7 at AT&T Park.

==== 2013 ====
The Cardinals hosted nine postseason games at Busch Stadium in 2013. In the National League Division Series, they won Games 1 and 5 against the Pittsburgh Pirates, with the latter game capping off a series comeback after trailing 2–1. They would win every home game of the NLCS against the Dodgers, including a 9–0 shutout win in Game 6 to take the series 4–2. In the World Series, the Cardinals hosted Games 3–5 against the Boston Red Sox. Game 3 on October 26 ended in an obstruction call when Allen Craig was impeded by Will Middlebrooks at third base, thus awarding him a run after umpire Jim Joyce ruled obstruction on the play. The next night Game 4 ended on a successful pickoff by Koji Uehara on pinch-runner Kolten Wong at first base. The Cardinals led 2–1 after the controversial Game 3 win, but proceeded to drop the next three games to lose the series 4–2.

==== 2014 ====
The Cardinals played two games in Busch Stadium against the Los Angeles Dodgers in the National League Division Series. The first two games of the Series were played at Dodger Stadium in Los Angeles, and the teams each won a game there. The Series then moved to Busch Stadium, and the Cardinals won the next two games, to win the Series 3-1 and advance to the National League Championship Series.

The Cardinals opened the National League Championship Series at Busch Stadium on October 11, 2014, against the San Francisco Giants. The teams split games 1 and 2 played at Busch Stadium, and the Series moved to AT&T Park in San Francisco. The Giants won games 3, 4, and 5 in their home ballpark, to defeat the Cardinals in the NLCS 4–1, and move on to an appearance in the 2014 World Series against the Kansas City Royals.

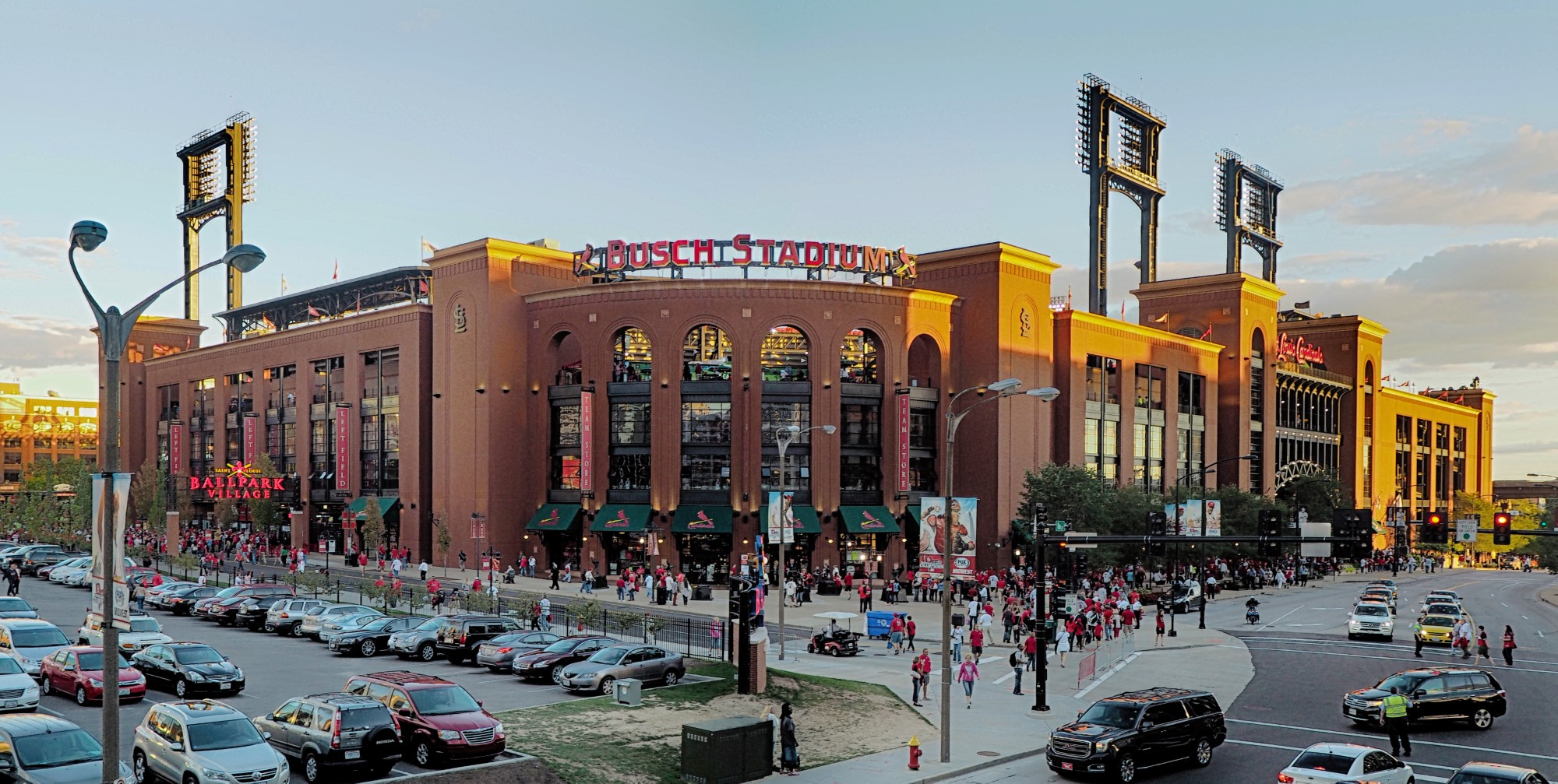
Busch Stadium in St. Louis, MO

==== 2015 ====
The Cardinals hosted two postseason games at Busch Stadium in 2015. In the National League Division Series, they won game 1 on October 9, 2015, but lost game 2 against the Chicago Cubs. The Cardinals then lost games 3 and 4 to the Cubs at Wrigley Field to lose the series 3–1.

==== 2019 ====
The Cardinals hosted four postseason games at Busch Stadium in 2019, in the National League Division Series against the Atlanta Braves. After splitting the first two games in Atlanta, the Cardinals lost Game 3 to be down 2-1 in the series, but secured the win in Game 4 after a walk-off sac fly by Yadier Molina who had also tied the game late in his previous at bat. St Louis would finish off the Braves and the series with a 10-run thumping in the 1st inning of Game 5 winning 13-1. The Cardinals next played the National League Championship Series against the Washington Nationals, losing every game including the first two at Busch.

=== MLB All-Star Game ===
The stadium hosted the 2009 Major League Baseball All-Star Game on July 14, 2009. The American League defeated the National League in that game, 4–3. Tampa Bay Rays outfielder Carl Crawford won MVP. President Barack Obama threw out the ceremonial first pitch wearing a Chicago White Sox jacket.

=== College and high school baseball ===
Missouri started playing games at Busch in 2009 when they defeated SLU. The Tigers have also played at Busch in 2010, 2017, and 2018.

The Cardinals have allowed local high school teams to play each other on the field following select weekend afternoon games. So far, only 3 homeruns have been hit by high school students. The first was on May 7, 2011, by Johnny Wilson of Marquette Catholic High School against Farmington High School. The second was on April 11, 2018, by Zach Hilboldt of De Smet Jesuit High school against Palmyra High School. The third was on April 21, 2018, by David Olejnik (St. Louis Home School Patriots) against Marshall County High School, Benton, Kentucky.

== Other sports ==
=== Professional soccer ===
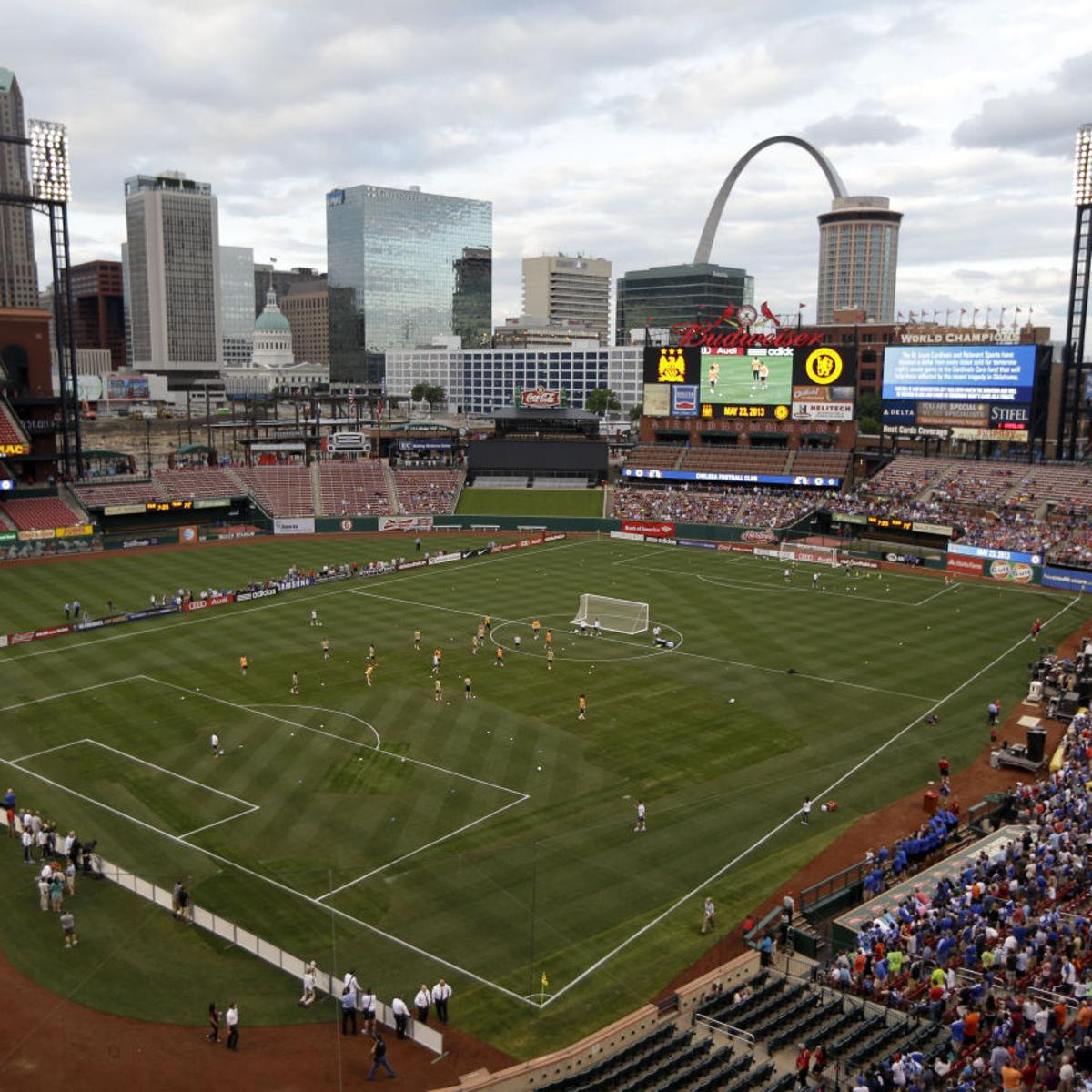
Busch Stadium on May 23, 2013 prior to the match between Chelsea F.C. and Manchester City F.C.

Busch Stadium hosted an exhibition soccer game on May 23, 2013, between English clubs Manchester City and Chelsea. Tickets for the match sold out within 20 minutes of going on sale, and Manchester City won 4–3 in front of a crowd of 48,263, to date the 2nd largest attendance at a sporting event at the stadium.

Later that year on November 18, Busch hosted a friendly between Bosnia and Herzegovina and Argentina; before a crowd of more than 30,000, many of which were members of St. Louis' large Bosniak community, Argentina beat Bosnia 2–0, with Sergio Agüero scoring both goals.

On April 4, 2015, the United States Women's National Soccer Team defeated New Zealand 4–0 in front of over 35,000 fans.

On November 13, 2015, the United States Men's National Soccer Team defeated St. Vincent and the Grenadines 6–1 in the first match of the fourth round of qualifiers for the 2018 FIFA World Cup in front of a crowd of 43,433.

Another international friendly was hosted at Busch in 2016: Italian side A.S. Roma, bolstered by a goal from Bosnian star Edin Džeko, defeated Liverpool F.C. 2–1.

The United States women's national team returned on May 16, 2019, for another friendly against New Zealand as part of their preparations for the 2019 FIFA Women's World Cup. The United States won 5–0 in front of 35,761 spectators.

Date	Winning Team	Result	Losing Team	Tournament	Spectators
May 23, 2013	(England) Manchester City	4–3	(England) Chelsea	Club Friendly	48,263
November 18, 2013	Argentina	2–0	Bosnia and Herzegovina	International Friendly	30,397
April 4, 2015	United States women	4–0	New Zealand women	Women's International Friendly	35,817
November 13, 2015	United States	6–1	Saint Vincent and the Grenadines	2018 FIFA World Cup qualification	43,433
August 1, 2016	(Italy) Roma	2–1	(England) Liverpool	Club Friendly	29,000
May 16, 2019	United States women	5–0	New Zealand women	Women's International Friendly	35,761
September 10, 2019	United States	1–1	Uruguay	International Friendly	20,625

=== Professional hockey ===
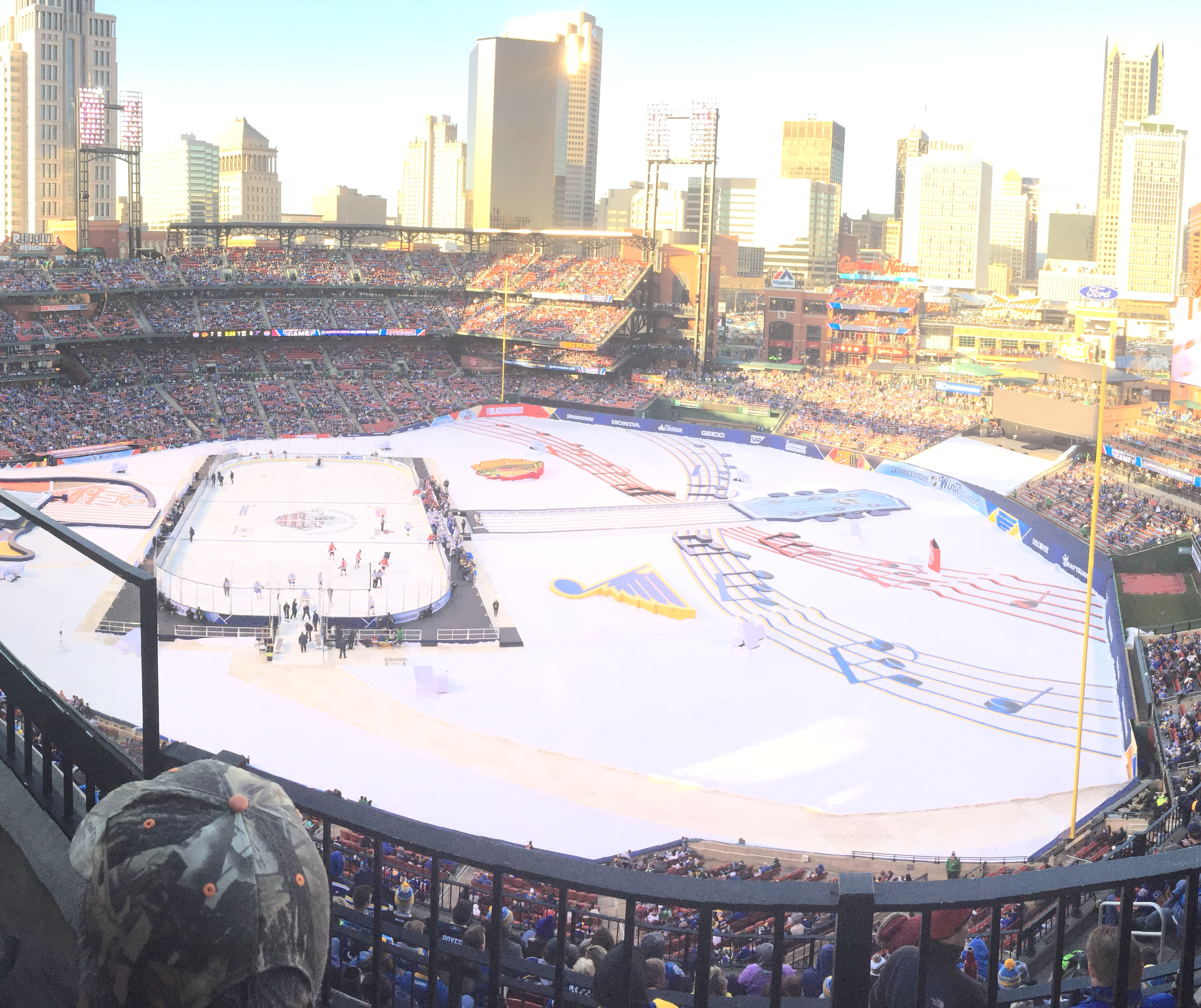
Busch Stadium hosts the 2017 Alumni game 2 days prior to the Winter Classic. December 31, 2016

On March 9, 2016, the National Hockey League announced that the St. Louis Blues, for the first time in their 50-year history, would host an outdoor game. The 2017 NHL Winter Classic was held at Busch Stadium on January 2, 2017. The Blues won the game by a score of 4–1 against the Chicago Blackhawks. Despite thick fog and spotty rain, Busch Stadium sold out to a crowd of 46,556 St. Louis hockey fans.

On June 12, 2019, the stadium hosted a watch party for Game 7 of the Stanley Cup Finals when the Blues beat the Boston Bruins and won their first ever Stanley Cup. The Cardinals offered the stadium for use as it was empty that evening (the Cards were at Miami for a series) and the Blues' main watch party at Enterprise Center had sold out within a minute for Game 7, with many of the $10 tickets being picked up by scalpers who sold them on secondary markets at inflated prices. More than 25,000 fans viewed the game on the main scoreboards while braving a heavy rainstorm that hit the area during the 1st period.

=== College football ===
Southern Illinois University and Southeast Missouri State played each other in the first ever football game at Busch Stadium on September 21, 2013. The announced attendance was 14,618.

Date	Winning Team	Result	Losing Team	Event	Attendance
September 21, 2013	Southern Illinois	36–19	Southeast Missouri State	College Classic	14,618

== Concerts ==
Date	Artist	Opening act(s)	Tour / Concert name	Attendance (paid/total)	Revenue	Notes
June 7, 2008	Dave Matthews Band	The Black Crowes	Summer 2008 Tour	33,235 / 34,450	$2,059,400	This show was recorded and later released as a live album, entitled Live Trax Vol. 13.
June 24, 2010	The Eagles	Dixie Chicks	Long Road Out of Eden Tour	25,904 / 35,318	$2,151,706	
July 17, 2011	U2	Interpol	360° Tour	52,273 / 52,273	$4,423,395	
August 13, 2016	Paul McCartney	—N/a	One on One tour	43,428 / 43,428	$4,657,982	
June 4, 2017	Metallica	Volbeat	WorldWired Tour	38,778 / 41,246	$4,633,807	
September 21, 2017	Billy Joel	—N/a	Billy Joel in Concert	40,189 / 40,947	$4,713,441	
July 21, 2018	Kenny Chesney	Thomas Rhett; Old Dominion; Brandon Lay	The Trip Around The Sun Tour	44,529 / 44,529	$4,753,889	
August 24, 2018	Journey; Def Leppard	Cheap Trick	Def Leppard & Journey 2018 Tour	31,865 / 33,420	$2,395,271	
August 25, 2018	Luke Bryan	Sam Hunt; Jon Pardi; Morgan Wallen	What Makes You Country Tour	36,255 / 38,051	$2,235,151	
September 6, 2018	Ed Sheeran	Snow Patrol; Anne-Marie	÷ Tour	41,522 / 41,522	$3,726,271	
May 7, 2022	Kenny Chesney	Dan + Shay, Old Dominion and Carly Pearce	Here and Now Tour			The show was initially scheduled for 2020, but was postponed due to the COVID-19 pandemic.
July 5, 2022	Mötley Crüe; Def Leppard	Poison; Joan Jett and The Blackhearts; Classless Act	The Stadium Tour	33,307 / 33,378	$4,213,041	The show was initially scheduled for June 25, 2020, but was postponed due to the COVID-19 pandemic.
June 17, 2023	Luke Combs					
July 6, 2024	Def Leppard; Journey	Cheap Trick	The Summer Stadium Tour			
September 29, 2024	Billy Joel	Sting				
May 13, 2025	Post Malone; Jelly Roll	Sierra Ferrell	Big Ass Stadium Tour			
August 2, 2026	Noah Kahan	Gigi Perez Annabelle Dinda	The Great Divide Tour			
August 16, 2026	Guns N' Roses	Public Enemy	2026 World Tour			

== Features ==
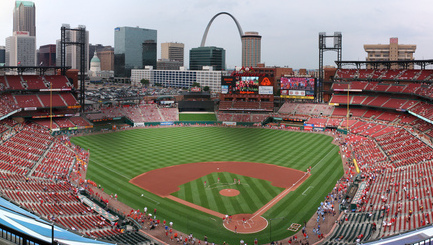
Busch Stadium in 2009

=== Design ===
Whereas the previous stadium was enclosed on all sides in the "cookie-cutter" style very similar to Riverfront, Veterans, Three Rivers and Atlanta-Fulton County stadiums, the new stadium is similar to the many other Populous designed "retro-classic" fields. Like all those, it offers a panoramic view of the downtown skyline.

The Gate 3 entrance on the west side of the stadium is most iconic, with a large "bridge" resembling the Eads Bridge arching over the entrance. The exterior of the stadium contains historical plaques of Cardinals logos, the STL insignia and a Busch Stadium logo behind home plate.

After complaints from fans that not all out-of-town games could be placed on the Daktronics out-of-town scoreboard at one time, following the inaugural season a number of advertisement panels were removed to expand the scoreboard and also create a secondary video board. In 2016, the entire original scoreboard and fascia-board system was replaced, creating two full HD video boards: the main board, which took up the entire area of the original scoreboard and video board, measures 4,800 sq ft (40 ft x 120 ft), with the out-of-town scoreboard measuring 3,280 sq ft (40 x 81 ft). 2019 saw the installation of LED floodlights with light-show capabilities, as well as the construction of the Budweiser Terrace in the right field upper deck. The Terrace is a multi-level general admission standing area with two full bars, a BBQ outlet and social areas in the concourse, and a stage area for pre- and in-game entertainment.

=== Statues ===
Outside the Gate 3 entrance stands a bronze statue of Cardinals legend Stan "The Man" Musial. Other Cardinals statues that previously surrounded Busch Memorial Stadium are now displayed at the corner of Clark and 8th streets, outside the Cardinals' team store. The statues are of former Cardinal players and Hall of Fame inductees Enos Slaughter, Dizzy Dean, Rogers Hornsby, Red Schoendienst, Lou Brock, Bob Gibson, Ozzie Smith, and Ted Simmons; former St. Louis Browns player and Hall of Fame inductee George Sisler; former Negro league St. Louis Stars player and Hall of Fame inductee Cool Papa Bell; and former Cardinals radio broadcaster and Hall of Fame honoree Jack Buck.

=== Concessions ===
Fans at the stadium have access to a large amount of food and drink options, ranging from standard ballpark fare like bratwurst, nachos and peanuts to St Louis-area favorites such as pork steak sandwiches and toasted ravioli. Budweiser holds the beer contract for the stadium as one would expect, but local craft breweries such as Saint Louis Brewery, Urban Chestnut, and 4 Hands all are available at multiple outlets. Tickets for multiple all-inclusive areas are sold on a single game basis, with amenities running the gamut from the ritzy Champions Club (offering a multiple-course buffet, large screen televisions, a chance to get on television or radio as a broadcast booth is located inside the club, and a full bar) to the more family-oriented Scoreboard Patio (with table seating for four in center field and a cookout-style selection of food). Cardinal management also allows outside food and drink (including soft-sided drink coolers); as a result, it is not uncommon to see vendors selling discounted bags of peanuts and bottles of soda and water, or even scalpers including a box of Cracker Jack with tickets.

==== "Fredbird" store ====
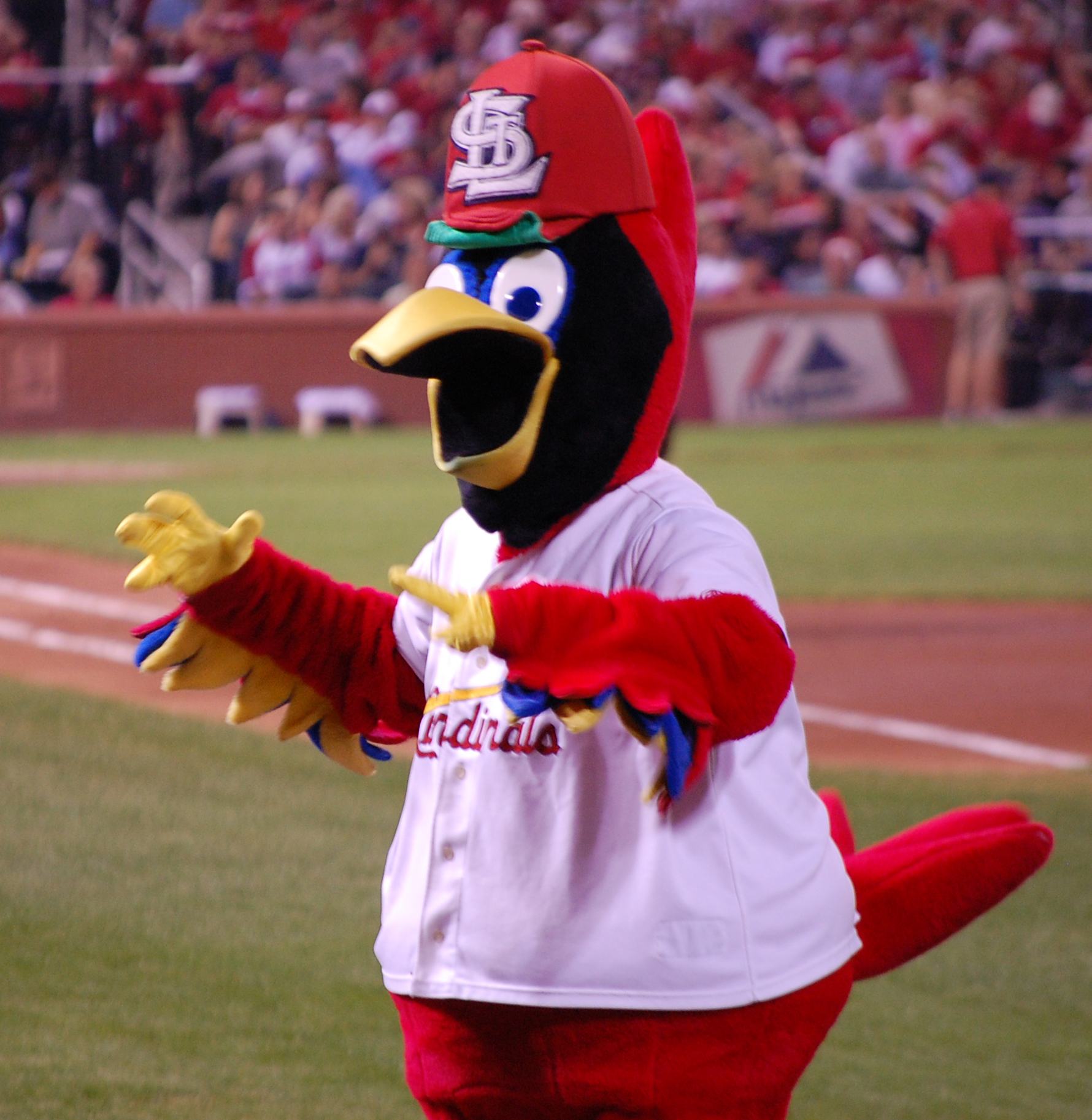
Fredbird entertaining the crowd between innings during a Cardinals game at Busch Stadium.

The ballpark features a make-your-own-mascot store featuring Fredbird, the Cardinals' team mascot. Operated by St. Louis-based Build-A-Bear, the store was first located in the right-field lower deck before it was moved to center field across from Ballpark Village in 2015 to allow it to be open on non-game days.

=== Press accommodations ===
After St. Louis Post-Dispatch sportswriter Rick Hummel was honored with the BBWAA Career Excellence Award and induction into the National Baseball Hall of Fame and Museum in 2007, the Cardinals renamed the stadium's press box the "Bob Broeg-Rick Hummel Press Box", honoring the two local writers enshrined in Cooperstown.

On October 3, 2021, the Cardinals honored Mike Shannon at his last game in St. Louis by naming the KMOX broadcast booth after Shannon. Shannon had been calling Cardinal games since 1971, and retired in 2021.

=== Ballpark Village ===
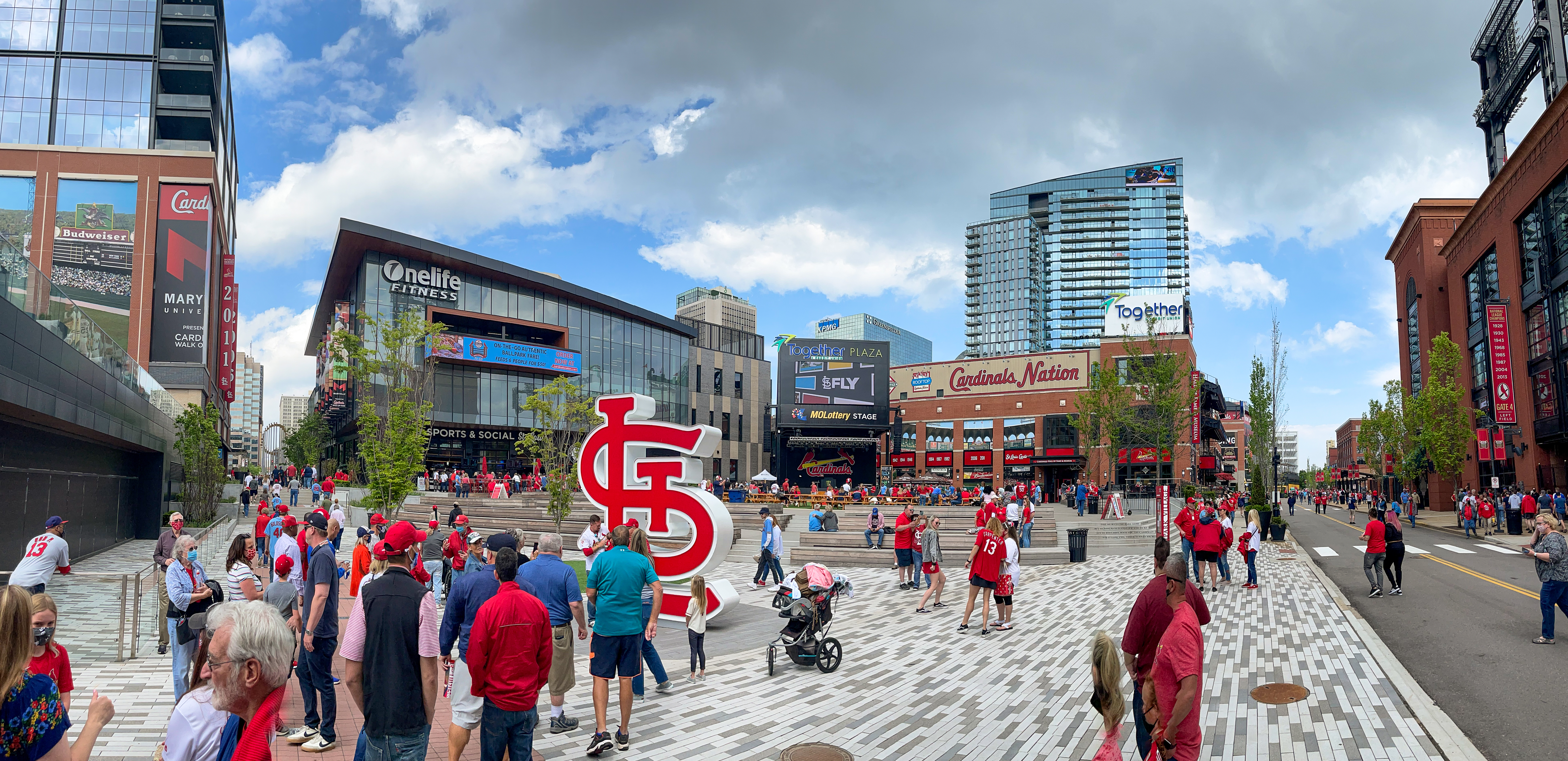
Cardinal fans at Ballpark Village after a game in 2021

Ballpark Village is a multi-phase residential and entertainment complex located on the site of the former Busch Memorial Stadium across the street from the new ballpark. Despite several years of delays, groundbreaking occurred in February 2013 and the first phase was completed in time for Opening Day 2014.

=== Other modifications ===
During a weather incident during a July 2006 game vs the Atlanta Braves, portable concession stands were knocked over, the infield rain tarp was damaged, and plastic sheets used to protect the press box were dislodged. As a result of the storm at least 30 spectators were injured, of whom five were taken to the hospital. After the storm happened, the stadium designated shelter areas for such disasters which are located throughout the ballpark.

Following Juan Encarnación's face injury on August 31, 2007, workers extended the screen from dugout to dugout during the 2007-2008 off season.

In 2018, the Cardinals Front Office announced that six sections of seating would be removed to make way for a new fan experience called the Budweiser Terrace, which features food, drinks, games, drink rails, and lounge style seating while providing a view of the game.

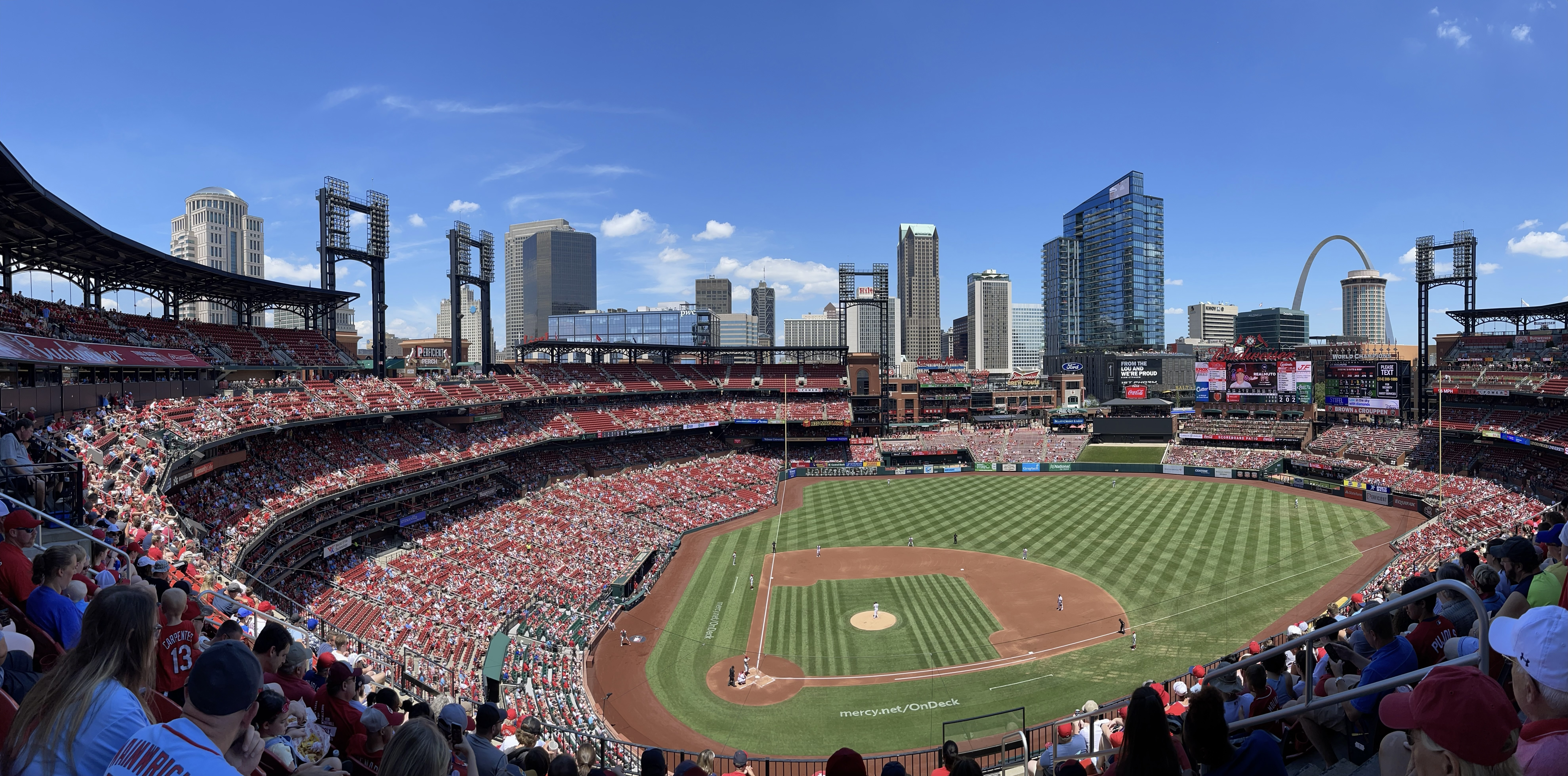
Panorama of Busch Stadium in 2022

== Regular season home attendance ==
Home attendance at Busch Stadium
Year	Total attendance	Game average	League rank
2006	3,407,104	42,588	4th
2007	3,552,180	43,854	4th
2008	3,432,917	42,382	4th
2009	3,343,252	41,275	4th
2010	3,301,218	40,756	4th
2011	3,093,954	38,197	6th
2012	3,262,109	40,273	6th
2013	3,369,769	41,602	2nd
2014	3,540,649	43,712	2nd
2015	3,520,889	43,468	2nd
2016	3,444,490	42,525	2nd
2017	3,448,337	42,572	2nd
2018	3,403,587	42,020	3rd
2019	3,480,393	42,968	2nd
2020	No Fans in Attendance	N/A	N/A
2021	2,102,530	26,281	4th
2022	3,320,551	40,994	2nd
2023	3,241,091	40,013	4th
2024	2,878,115	35,872	7th
2025	2,250,007	27,777	19th
2026	2,233,902	27,579	19th

== See also ==
- List of ballparks by capacity
- List of current Major League Baseball stadiums
- Lists of stadiums

Events and tenants
Preceded by Busch Memorial Stadium	Home of the St. Louis Cardinals; 2006 – present	Succeeded by Current
Preceded by Yankee Stadium	Host of the Major League Baseball All-Star Game; 2009	Succeeded by Angel Stadium of Anaheim
Preceded by Gillette Stadium	Host of the NHL Winter Classic; 2017	Succeeded by Citi Field
