= Sugar Water =

Sugar Water may refer to:

- Another name for inverted sugar syrup
- "Sugar Water", a song by Cibo Matto from Viva! La Woman
- "Sugar Water", a song by Gigi Perez from At the Beach, in Every Life
- Sugar Water Festival, a music festival founded by several artists
- "Sugar Water", an episode of Queen Sono
