= Orbiter (song) =

Single by Noah Kahan

from the album The Great Divide
- Released: July 10, 2026
- Length: 4:46
- Label: Mercury
- Songwriter: Noah Kahan
- Producers: Noah Kahan; Aaron Dessner; Gabe Simon

Noah Kahan singles chronology
"Doors" (2026)	"Orbiter" (2026)	"Draw You Out" (2026)

"Orbiter" is a song by American singer-songwriter Noah Kahan. It was sent to Italian radio on July 10, 2026 as the lead single from The Great Divide: The Last Of The Bugs, the deluxe edition of his fourth studio album The Great Divide (2026). Kahan wrote the song and produced it with Aaron Dessner and Gabe Simon.

== Background ==
Noah Kahan explained that the song was inspired by many important people in his life, including his wife, mother, and fans. He described it as reflecting on his devotion toward them and insecurities about his place in their lives, namely feeling as though he "orbits" the people closest to him.

== Composition ==
The song features a guitar-driven instrumental, while lyrically Kahan discusses his relationship with fame and his attitude toward it. He recalls his discomfort at his first Grammy Awards show in 2024 and disappointment over losing. Kahan criticizes the music industry, particularly in California, for treating up-and-coming artists as insignificant until they become successful. He also explores how being in the public eye may exacerbate one's self-worth and lead to one becoming dependent on approval from others.

== Critical reception ==
Maxim Mower of Holler praised the song for Kahan's "stunning" vocal performance and "much gentler, more intricate delivery", which he noted contrasts the "angst and rage" in some of his other songs.

== Charts ==
Chart performance for "Orbiter"
Chart (2026)	Peak position
Australia (ARIA)	23
Canada Hot 100 (Billboard)	27
Global 200 (Billboard)	71
Ireland (IRMA)	8
New Zealand (Recorded Music NZ)	21
Portugal (AFP)	157
Sweden Heatseeker (Sverigetopplistan)	6
UK Singles (Official Charts)	13
US Billboard Hot 100	33
US Adult Pop Airplay (Billboard)	16
US Hot Rock & Alternative Songs (Billboard)	6
US Pop Airplay (Billboard)	25

== Certifications ==
Certifications for "Orbiter"
Region	Certification	Certified units/sales
Canada (Music Canada)	Platinum	80,000^{‡}
Portugal (AFP)	Gold	12,000^{‡}
United Kingdom (BPI)	Silver	200,000^{‡}
^{‡} Sales+streaming figures based on certification alone.
