= Sailor Song (song) =

2024 single by Gigi Perez

Single by Gigi Perez

from the album At the Beach, in Every Life
- Released: July 26, 2024
- Recorded: February 2024
- Length: 3:31
- Label: Self-released
- Songwriter: Gianna Perez
- Producers: Perez; Noah Weinman

Gigi Perez singles chronology
"Please Be Rude" (2024)	"Sailor Song" (2024)	"Fable" (2024)

Music video
- "Sailor Song" on YouTube

"Sailor Song" is a song by American singer-songwriter Gigi Perez, released as a single on July 26, 2024. Her third independent track following her departure from Interscope Records, it went viral on TikTok and peaked at number 22 on the Billboard Hot 100. Outside of the United States, "Sailor Song" topped the charts in Ireland, Latvia, and the United Kingdom, and peaked within the top ten of the charts in various countries, including Australia, New Zealand, and Norway.

== Background ==
Perez went viral on TikTok in 2021 for her tracks "Celene" and "Sometimes (Backwood)", prompting Interscope Records to sign her and release her EP How to Catch a Falling Knife. Following her release from the label, Perez reverted to releasing music independently, starting with "Normalcy" and "Please Be Rude" in 2024. The single was released on 7-inch vinyl on January 10, 2025.

== Composition ==
Perez wrote "Sailor Song" in her bedroom in February 2024, having thought of the idea in the shower. At the time, she had been ruminating on the idea of a quick infatuation, and wrote the song while playing with her guitar, "kiss me on the mouth and love me like a sailor" first. She recorded the song using a Shure SM7 and recorded three vocals, which were panned to the left, the right, and the centre. An acoustic ballad, she began teasing the track on TikTok in April 2024, where it went viral. The song describes Perez being attracted to a woman who looks like actress Anne Hathaway. In the chorus, she asks her lover to "kiss me on the mouth and love me like a sailor" and "And when you get a taste, can you tell me, what's my flavor?"

== Reception ==
Perez released the track on July 26, 2024; by August 27, the initial clip had soundtracked over 40,000 videos on the platform and the official audio had been used in over 75,000. The song drew criticism from conservative Christian communities online for the lyrics "I don't believe in God / But I believe that you're my savior". In August 2024, in response to requests to remove this lyric, Perez wrote in captions on TikTok that she would not entertain such a lyric change as her songwriting was "not a democracy".

Fans linked her sound to that of indie folk artists such as Bon Iver, Fleet Foxes and Hozier, while the Official Charts Company wrote that the track had been compared to Hozier, the National, and Bon Iver. The track became both her first song to reach the Billboard Hot 100 and her first to reach the UK Singles Chart, peaking at the top of the latter chart. The Official Charts Company wrote that it was "a landmark moment to see such a brazen gay love song reach Number 1 in the UK".

On the week commencing November 25, 2024, "Sailor Song" was announced by Chris Moyles as that week's "Record of the Week" on British indie and alternative rock station Radio X. Perez discussed the success of the song and the advice she received from Mumford & Sons the previous week on The Evening Show With Dan O'Connell, where she also performed an acoustic version of the song. When asked about the context of the song, Perez stated: "It's just changed so much and I think the place that I was writing 'Sailor Song' was from a place of this deep fear and this hole. And so it's a love song, but that love song was written as in like, this person is my escape from this really uncertain, helpless thing that I've been dealing with... and I'm getting therapy, so I'm doing great, but that's where it came from."

== Charts ==
=== Weekly charts ===
Weekly chart performance for "Sailor Song"
Chart (2024–2026)	Peak position
Australia (ARIA)	8
Austria (Ö3 Austria Top 40)	4
Belgium (Ultratop 50 Flanders)	8
Belgium (Ultratop 50 Wallonia)	11
Canada Hot 100 (Billboard)	16
Canada Modern Rock (Billboard Canada)	30
Czech Republic Singles Digital (ČNS IFPI)	4
Denmark (Tracklisten)	27
Finland (Suomen virallinen lista)	10
France (SNEP)	82
Germany (GfK)	17
Global 200 (Billboard)	10
Greece International (IFPI)	14
Hungary (Single Top 40)	38
Iceland (Tónlistinn)	24
India International (IMI)	4
Indonesia (Billboard)	19
Ireland (IRMA)	1
Israel (Mako Hitlist)	78
Italy (FIMI)	86
Latvia Airplay (LaIPA)	3
Latvia Streaming (LaIPA)	1
Lebanon English (Lebanese Top 20)	20
Lithuania (AGATA)	2
Luxembourg (Billboard)	13
Netherlands (Dutch Top 40)	13
Netherlands (Single Top 100)	6
New Zealand (Recorded Music NZ)	3
Norway (VG-lista)	3
Philippines Hot 100 (Billboard Philippines)	33
Poland (Polish Streaming Top 100)	12
Portugal (AFP)	53
Singapore (RIAS)	12
Slovakia Singles Digital (ČNS IFPI)	4
Sweden (Sverigetopplistan)	5
Switzerland (Schweizer Hitparade)	8
UK Singles (Official Charts)	1
UK Indie (Official Charts)	3
US Billboard Hot 100	22
US Adult Alternative Airplay (Billboard)	5
US Adult Pop Airplay (Billboard)	19
US Hot Rock & Alternative Songs (Billboard)	3
US Pop Airplay (Billboard)	17
US Rock & Alternative Airplay (Billboard)	14

=== Monthly charts ===
Monthly chart performance for "Sailor Song"
Chart (2024)	Peak position
Czech Republic (Singles Digitál Top 100)	15
Lithuania Airplay (TopHit)	17
Slovakia (Singles Digitál Top 100)	29

=== Year-end charts ===
2024 year-end chart performance for "Sailor Song"
Chart (2024)	Position
Austria (Ö3 Austria Top 40)	67
Netherlands (Dutch Top 40)	92
Netherlands (Single Top 100)	94
Switzerland (Schweizer Hitparade)	94
UK Singles (OCC)	47
US Hot Rock & Alternative Songs (Billboard)	37
US Rock & Alternative Airplay (Billboard)	35

2025 year-end chart performance for "Sailor Song"
Chart (2025)	Position
Australia (ARIA)	21
Austria (Ö3 Austria Top 40)	44
Belgium (Ultratop 50 Flanders)	64
Belgium (Ultratop 50 Wallonia)	33
Canada (Canadian Hot 100)	33
Canada CHR/Top 40 (Billboard)	100
Canada Hot AC (Billboard)	91
Canada Modern Rock (Billboard)	76
Germany (GfK)	77
Global 200 (Billboard)	16
India International (IMI)	16
Netherlands (Single Top 100)	50
New Zealand (Recorded Music NZ)	15
Philippines (Philippines Hot 100)	46
Poland (Polish Streaming Top 100)	58
Sweden (Sverigetopplistan)	56
Switzerland (Schweizer Hitparade)	28
UK Singles (OCC)	18
US Billboard Hot 100	36
US Adult Pop Airplay (Billboard)	47
US Hot Rock & Alternative Songs (Billboard)	7
US Pop Airplay (Billboard)	42

== Certifications ==
Certifications for "Sailor Song"
Region	Certification	Certified units/sales
Australia (ARIA)	4× Platinum	280,000^{‡}
Belgium (BRMA)	Platinum	40,000^{‡}
Brazil (Pro-Música Brasil)	2× Diamond	320,000^{‡}
Canada (Music Canada)	4× Platinum	320,000^{‡}
Denmark (IFPI Danmark)	Platinum	90,000^{‡}
France (SNEP)	Platinum	200,000^{‡}
Germany (BVMI)	Gold	300,000^{‡}
Italy (FIMI)	Gold	100,000^{‡}
New Zealand (RMNZ)	4× Platinum	120,000^{‡}
Poland (ZPAV)	Platinum	50,000^{‡}
Portugal (AFP)	3× Platinum	30,000^{‡}
Spain (Promusicae)	Gold	50,000^{‡}
United Kingdom (BPI)	3× Platinum	1,800,000^{‡}
United States (RIAA)	4× Platinum	4,000,000^{‡}
Streaming
Czech Republic (ČNS IFPI)	Platinum	5,000,000^{†}
Greece (IFPI Greece)	Platinum	2,000,000^{†}
Slovakia (ČNS IFPI)	Platinum	1,700,000^{†}
Sweden (GLF)	Platinum	12,000,000^{†}
^{‡} Sales+streaming figures based on certification alone.^{†} Streaming-only figures based on certification alone.
