= The Great Divide (Noah Kahan album) =

2026 studio album by Noah Kahan

Studio album by Noah Kahan
- Released: April 24, 2026
- Studios: Long Pond (Hudson Valley, New York); Guilford Sound (Guilford, Vermont); Fire Tower Farm (Only, Tennessee); Gold Pacific (Nashville)
- Genres: Folk; folk rock; Americana
- Length: 77:20
- Label: Mercury
- Producers: Aaron Dessner; Noah Kahan; Gabe Simon

Noah Kahan chronology
Live from Fenway Park (2024)	The Great Divide (2026)

Singles from The Great Divide
- 1. "The Great Divide" Released: January 30, 2026; 2. "Porch Light" Released: March 13, 2026; 3. "Doors" Released: May 1, 2026; 4. "Orbiter" Released: July 10, 2026

Professional ratings
Review scores
Source	Rating
AllMusic	3.5/5 stars
Clash	8/10
The Guardian	3/5 stars
The Irish Times	2/5 stars
Paste	C
Pitchfork	6.2/10
Rolling Stone	4.5/5 stars
Slant	3/5 stars
Spill Magazine	10/10

The Great Divide is the fourth studio album by the American singer-songwriter Noah Kahan. It was announced on January 28, 2026, with the single of the same name releasing two days later on January 30. A North American tour, The Great Divide Tour, was also announced, spanning the United States and Canada from June to December 2026. The album was released on April 24, 2026, through Mercury Records and debuted at number one in both the United States and United Kingdom, with the former being the best first-week sales for a rock album in over a decade. Music outlets were generally impressed by the project, although some criticized the record's length.

The expanded edition of the album, The Great Divide: The Last of the Bugs, is nominated for the Grammy Award for Best Contemporary Folk Album.

== Background ==
Kahan built up the announcement of the album through months of social media teases, posting to a TikTok account named "thelastofthebugs" with a short clip captioned "you weren't supposed to find this... only the last of the bugs ever do". "The last of the bugs" is a reference to Kahan's song "The View Between Villages". Hints and clues continued to be dropped on this TikTok account, in addition to Noah's own TikTok account, throughout December 2025 and January 2026.

The album was officially announced on January 28, 2026, with Kahan explaining that the album was written "next to a piano in Nashville, next to a pond in Guilford Vermont, in a legendary studio in upstate New York, on a farm with a firetower in Only, Tennessee."

== Extended edition ==
On April 24, Kahan announced an expanded edition, subtitled "The Last of the Bugs", which adds four additional tracks to the original seventeen.

== Track listing ==
The Great Divide standard edition track listing
No.	Title	Writer(s)	Producer(s)	Length
1.	"End of August"	Noah Kahan; Aaron Dessner	Kahan; Dessner; Gabe Simon^{[a]}	5:17
2.	"Doors"	Kahan; Sam Westhoff	Kahan; Simon	3:51
3.	"American Cars"	Kahan; Carrie K; Noah Levine; Gabe Simon	Kahan; Simon	4:32
4.	"Downfall"	Kahan; Dessner; Simon	Kahan; Dessner; Simon	4:15
5.	"Paid Time Off"	Kahan; Carrie K; Simon; Westhoff	Kahan; Simon	3:47
6.	"The Great Divide"	Kahan; Simon	Kahan; Simon	5:17
7.	"Haircut"	Kahan; Nina de Vitry	Kahan; Simon	4:49
8.	"Willing and Able"	Kahan; Levine	Kahan; Dessner; Simon^{[a]}; Levine^{[a]}	4:57
9.	"Dashboard"	Kahan; Amy Allen; Carrie K; Simon	Kahan; Simon	3:50
10.	"23"	Kahan	Kahan; Simon	4:41
11.	"Porch Light"	Kahan; Dessner	Kahan; Dessner; Simon	4:22
12.	"Deny Deny Deny"	Kahan; Todd Clark; Carrie K; Simon; Westhoff	Kahan; Simon	3:50
13.	"Headed North"	Kahan	Kahan; Simon	4:26
14.	"We Go Way Back"	Kahan; Dylan Jones; Carrie K; Simon	Kahan; Simon	4:02
15.	"Spoiled"	Kahan	Kahan; Dessner	5:06
16.	"All Them Horses"	Kahan	Kahan; Simon	5:13
17.	"Dan"	Kahan; Dessner	Kahan; Dessner; Simon^{[a]}	5:05
Total length:				77:20

The Great Divide: The Last of the Bugs deluxe edition track listing
No.	Title	Writer(s)	Producer(s)	Length
5.	"Lighthouse"	Kahan; Dessner; Simon	Kahan; Dessner; Simon	5:05
7.	"Staying Still"	Kahan; Carrie K; Simon	Kahan; Simon	4:29
19.	"A Few of Your Own"	Kahan; Dessner; Simon	Kahan; Dessner; Simon	4:30
20.	"Orbiter"	Kahan	Kahan; Dessner; Simon^{[a]}	4:47
Total length:				96:11

=== Note ===
- ^{^[a]} indicates an additional producer

== Personnel ==
Credits are adapted from Tidal.

=== Musicians ===
- Noah Kahan – vocals (all tracks), piano (track 1), background vocals (2, 6, 7, 9, 10, 12, 14, 16), acoustic guitar (3–9, 11, 13–17), guitars (6, 10, 15, 16), mandolin (11), electric guitar (12, 15)
- Carrie K – drums (1–12, 14, 16, 17), percussion (2, 3, 5–7, 9, 10, 12, 13), background vocals (5, 9, 13), animal sounds (14, 16)
- Gabe Simon – electric guitar (1, 2, 6, 9, 12, 14), mandolin (1, 2, 6, 12), background vocals (2, 6, 9, 12, 13), baritone guitar (2, 4, 6), bass (2–4, 6, 7, 10, 12, 14, 16), drums (2, 4), hurdy-gurdy (2), percussion (2, 3, 6, 13), slide guitar (2, 10), acoustic guitar (2, 13), banjo (4, 5, 10), upright bass (5), Hammond B3 (8), piano (9, 10); bouzouki, electric mandolin (12); programming (14); 12-string acoustic guitar, guitars (16)
- Dylan Jones – organ (1, 6), acoustic guitar (1, 14), piano (2, 3, 10, 14), mandolin (2, 6), background vocals (2), banjo (3, 11, 14, 16); mandocello, pump organ (3); keyboards (6), Mellotron (7, 15), Dobro guitar (7, 16), slide guitar (14), electric piano (16)
- Nina de Vitry – fiddle (1, 5, 7, 11, 16), cello (1, 16), violin (2, 14), mandolin (7), background vocals (16)
- Aaron Dessner – acoustic guitar, shaker (1, 4, 8, 11, 15); piano (1, 4, 8), synthesizer (1, 4, 11, 15, 17), bass synthesizer (1, 4, 15), electric guitar (1, 8, 11, 15); electric bass guitar, drums (1, 8, 15); guitars (1, 8, 17), drum programming (1, 17), Mellotron (4, 8, 11, 17), bass (4, 8, 17), Hammond B3 (4), tambourine (8, 11, 15), baritone guitar (8), banjo (11, 15, 17); body percussion, grand piano, upright piano (11); slide guitar (15); acoustic keyboard, mandolin, percussion (17)
- Benjamin Lanz – trombone (1)
- Noah Levine – electric guitar (3, 6), acoustic guitar (3, 8), baritone guitar (7), background vocals (13)
- Eddy Dunlap – pedal steel guitar (4, 8, 10, 17)
- Justin Vernon – background vocals, banjo (4); electric guitar (15, 17)
- Alberto Sewald – saw (7)
- Rob Moose – string arrangement (8)
- Sam Westhoff – organ (9, 12)
- Amy Allen – background vocals (9)
- Andrew Barr – drums (11, 15)

=== Technical ===
- Bella Blasko – engineering (1, 4, 11, 15)
- Sam Westhoff – engineering (2, 3, 5, 9, 10, 12, 13)
- Phillip Smith – engineering (2, 3, 6)
- Alberto Sewald – engineering (7, 9, 11, 16), additional engineering (1, 4, 5, 8, 10, 17), engineering assistance (2, 3, 6)
- Maddie Harmon – engineering (11), additional engineering (1, 4, 5, 8, 10, 17)
- Gabe Simon – engineering (14)
- Gillian Pelkonen – engineering assistance (1, 4, 8, 11, 15, 17)
- Matt Hall – engineering assistance (2, 3, 5, 9, 10, 12, 13)
- Benjamin Lanz – additional engineering (1)
- Rob Moose – additional engineering (8)
- Todd Clark – additional engineering (12)
- Ryan Hewitt – mixing
- Max Challis – mixing assistance
- Tyler Spratt – mixing assistance
- Ted Jensen – mastering
- Carrie K – production coordination

== Charts ==
Chart performance for The Great Divide
Chart (2026)	Peak position
Australian Albums (ARIA)	1
Austrian Albums (Ö3 Austria)	2
Belgian Albums (Ultratop Flanders)	3
Belgian Albums (Ultratop Wallonia)	5
Canadian Albums (Billboard)	1
Danish Albums (Hitlisten)	4
Dutch Albums (Album Top 100)	1
Finnish Albums (Suomen virallinen lista)	17
French Albums (SNEP)	27
German Albums (Offizielle Top 100)	1
German Pop Albums (Offizielle Top 100)	1
Irish Albums (Official Charts)	1
Italian Albums (FIMI)	38
New Zealand Albums (RMNZ)	1
Norwegian Albums (IFPI Norge)	6
Polish Albums (ZPAV)	15
Portuguese Albums (AFP)	4
Scottish Albums (Official Charts)	1
Spanish Albums (Promusicae)	13
Swedish Albums (Sverigetopplistan)	4
Swiss Albums (Schweizer Hitparade)	1
UK Albums (Official Charts)	1
UK Americana Albums (Official Charts)	1
US Billboard 200	1
US Americana/Folk Albums (Billboard)	1
US Top Rock & Alternative Albums (Billboard)	1

== Certifications ==
Certifications
Region	Certification	Certified units/sales
Canada (Music Canada)	2× Platinum	160,000^{‡}
New Zealand (RMNZ)	Platinum	15,000^{‡}
United Kingdom (BPI)	Gold	100,000^{‡}
United States (RIAA)	Platinum	1,000,000^{‡}
^{‡} Sales+streaming figures based on certification alone.
