= Some Things Never Leave =

Studio album by Annabelle Dinda
- Released: January 30, 2026
- Genre: Folk rock
- Length: 40:26
- Producers: Annabelle Dinda; Jacob Portrait

Annabelle Dinda chronology
| Sixth Sense (2024) | Some Things Never Leave (2026) |

Singles from Some Things Never Leave
- 1. "The Hand" Released: November 7th, 2025

Some Things Never Leave is the fourth studio album by Annabelle Dinda. It was released on January 30, 2026 and distributed by The Orchard, a music publishing company owned by Sony Music Entertainment. The album features "The Hand", which was released on November 7, 2025. The album was co-produced by Jacob Portrait.

== Track listing ==
Some Things Never Leave track listing
| No. | Title | Writer(s) | Producer(s) | Length |
|---|---|---|---|---|
| 1. | "Big News Day" | Annabelle Dinda | Annabelle Dinda; Jacob Portrait; Carter Nyhan; James Krivhenia; Bobby Hawk | 3:21 |
| 2. | "Cosmic Microwave Background" | Annabelle Dinda | Annabelle Dinda; Jacob Portrait; Carter Nyhan; James Krivhenia; Bobby Hawk | 3:23 |
| 3. | "Doesn't Matter" | Annabelle Dinda | Annabelle Dinda; Jacob Portrait; Carter Nyhan; James Krivhenia | 3:05 |
| 4. | "Satellites" | Annabelle Dinda | Annabelle Dinda; Dave Eggar; Jacob Portrait; Carter Nyhan; James Krivhenia; Bobby Hawk | 4:30 |
| 5. | "Everyone Likes To Be Forgiven" | Annabelle Dinda | Annabelle Dinda; Jacob Portrait; Carter Nyhan; James Krivhenia; John Keek | 4:00 |
| 6. | "Gunpoint, Headlock" | Annabelle Dinda | Annabelle Dinda; Jacob Portrait; Carter Nyhan; Bobby Hawk | 3:53 |
| 7. | "The Hand" | Annabelle Dinda | Annabelle Dinda; Jacob Portrait; Carter Nyhan; John Nellen; Bobby Hawk | 3:10 |
| 8. | "To Reconcile" | Annabelle Dinda | Annabelle Dinda; Jacob Portrait; Carter Nyhan | 3:51 |
| 9. | "The Body Remembers" | Annabelle Dinda | Annabelle Dinda; Jacob Portrait; Carter Nyhan; Dave Eggar; Bobby Hawk | 4:59 |
| 10. | "London Plane Trees Grow In Philly" | Annabelle Dinda | Annabelle Dinda; Jacob Portrait; Carter Nyhan | 6:09 |
| Total length: | | | | 40:26 |
