= American Cars (song) =

2026 song by Noah Kahan

Song by Noah Kahan

from the album The Great Divide
- Released: April 24, 2026
- Genre: Folk pop; heartland rock; indie rock
- Length: 4:32
- Label: Mercury
- Songwriters: Noah Kahan; Carrie K; Noah Levine; Gabe Simon
- Producers: Kahan; Simon

"American Cars" is a song by American singer-songwriter Noah Kahan from his fourth studio album The Great Divide (2026). He wrote the song with Carrie K, Noah Levine and Gabe Simon and produced it with Simon.

== Background ==
In an interview with Rolling Stone, Noah Kahan stated that he wrote the song from the perspective of his sister, Sasha.

== Composition ==
The song has been described as folk pop, heartland rock and indie rock. Over electric guitars and drums, with the addition of banjo during the chorus, Noah Kahan sings about receiving help from one's loved ones in dealing with emotional struggles and feeling grateful for their support. He first admits to "gaslighting" his friends into thinking he was too busy to hang out, hinting that he assumes his hometown believes that fame has changed him. Kahan depicts himself receiving a warm welcome from his family and friends, as they thank him for finally returning home and admire his new American car and Ray-Ban sunglasses. In the second verse, he describes a person who has "really lost it" and been "sitting on the porch" and "ranting like a prophet", perhaps referring to his father or one of his brothers.

== Critical reception ==
The song received generally positive reviews. Lyndsey Havens of Billboard ranked it as the sixth best song from The Great Divide, calling it a "lyrically layered, profound track". Nicole Fell of The Hollywood Reporter considered it a standout on the album and stated that it "should be a definitive contender for a down-the-line radio single". Reviewing the album for Atwood Magazine, Mitch Mosk described the song as "one of the clearest examples of how this record expands Kahan's sound without losing its core – scaling up sonically while staying rooted in the same emotional immediacy that made his earlier work resonate so deeply." Lindsay Zoladz of The New York Times regarded it as one of the album's strongest moments. Ed Power of The Irish Times criticized the song, commenting that it "sounds a bit like a fake Bruce Springsteen song from a film that doesn't have the rights to his music."

== Usage ==
The song was featured in a July 2026 social media post by the White House of president Donald Trump touring a General Motors plant in Michigan. Kahan denounced the post, stating that he "would never approve of my music being used in support of you or this administration." Co-writer Noah Lavine stated: "You fat fuck this song isn't for you."

== Charts ==
Chart performance for "American Cars"
Chart (2026)	Peak position
Australia (ARIA)	31
Canada Hot 100 (Billboard)	13
Global 200 (Billboard)	34
New Zealand (Recorded Music NZ)	25
UK Audio Streaming (Official Charts)	41
US Billboard Hot 100	16
US Hot Rock & Alternative Songs (Billboard)	4

== Certifications ==
Certifications for "American Cars"
Region	Certification	Certified units/sales
Canada (Music Canada)	Gold	40,000^{‡}
^{‡} Sales+streaming figures based on certification alone.
