= Doors (song) =

2026 single by Noah Kahan

Single by Noah Kahan

from the album The Great Divide
- Released: May 1, 2026
- Genre: Folk rock; Americana; roots rock
- Length: 3:51
- Label: Mercury
- Songwriters: Noah Kahan; Sam Westhoff
- Producers: Kahan; Gabe Simon

Noah Kahan singles chronology
"Porch Light" (2026)	"Doors" (2026)	"Orbiter" (2026)

"Doors" is a song by American singer-songwriter Noah Kahan, released to Italian radio on May 1, 2026, as the third single from his fourth studio album The Great Divide. He wrote the song with Sam Westhoff and produced it with Gabe Simon.

== Background ==
Noah Kahan began teasing the song in October 2024 and performed it at a number of concerts prior to its release, debuting it live at the Out of the Blue Festival Pool Party in Cancún, Mexico in January 2025.

== Composition ==
The song contains electric guitar. It opens with Noah Kahan recalling how as a child he would pretend sticks were guns and point them at his father, before suggesting he has an inherent tendency to "hurt anyone I could", particularly those who become emotionally intimate with him. He likens his personality to the weather of his native state, Vermont ("Malcontented and unwarm"). During the chorus, Kahan explores his insecurities and the paradox of desiring to be understood while also actively trying to prevent it; he metaphorically describes showing his partner doors but not allowing her to open them. Kahan suggests that nervousness about the relationship stems from facing rejection in the past and details his fear of her leaving him, such as jumping at the sound of rattling keys. He notes she has many reasons to do so, but that he really loves her and hopes to work out his trust issues.

== Critical reception ==
The song received generally positive reviews. Lyndsey Havens of Billboard ranked it as the seventh best song from The Great Divide. Nicole Fell of The Hollywood Reporter described the song as "cinematic and subtle", adding "Kahan's explosive vocals come alive on the second verse." Reviewing the album for Rolling Stone, Jon Dolan wrote "'Doors' sets the ambitious tone early on with a wide-open Americana-rock heft that could win a shoulder-smack of approval from Tom Petty or Bruce Springsteen." Pitchfork's Hannah Jocelyn was critical of the song, describing it as "a little too Wilder Mind for comfort".

== Charts ==
Chart performance for "Doors"
Chart (2026)	Peak position
Australia (ARIA)	16
Canada Hot 100 (Billboard)	2
Canada Mainstream Rock (Billboard Canada)	29
Canada Modern Rock (Billboard Canada)	2
Global 200 (Billboard)	13
Ireland (IRMA)	3
Latvia Airplay (TopHit)	65
Netherlands (Single Top 100)	76
New Zealand (Recorded Music NZ)	9
Portugal (AFP)	200
South Africa Streaming (TOSAC)	74
Sweden (Sverigetopplistan)	85
Switzerland (Schweizer Hitparade)	65
UK Singles (Official Charts)	12
US Billboard Hot 100	9
US Hot Rock & Alternative Songs (Billboard)	1

== Certifications ==
Certifications for "Doors"
Region	Certification	Certified units/sales
Canada (Music Canada)	Platinum	80,000^{‡}
New Zealand (RMNZ)	Gold	15,000^{‡}
United Kingdom (BPI)	Silver	200,000^{‡}
^{‡} Sales+streaming figures based on certification alone.
