= At the Beach, in Every Life =

2025 studio album by Gigi Perez

Studio album by Gigi Perez
- Released: April 25, 2025
- Genre: Indie folk
- Length: 46:46
- Labels: Outtahere; Island
- Producers: Gigi Perez; Noah Weinman; Aidan Hobbs

Gigi Perez chronology
How to Catch a Falling Knife (2023)	At the Beach, in Every Life (2025)

Singles from At the Beach, in Every Life
- 1. "Normalcy" Released: March 15, 2024; 2. "Please Be Rude" Released: May 10, 2024; 3. "Sailor Song" Released: July 26, 2024; 4. "Fable" Released: October 25, 2024; 5. "Chemistry" Released: February 28, 2025; 6. "At the Beach, In Every Life" Released: July 22, 2025

At the Beach, in Every Life is the debut studio album by American singer-songwriter Gigi Perez. It was released on April 25, 2025, by Outtahere and Island Records. Produced by Perez, Noah Weinman, and Aidan Hobbs, the album touches on themes of love ("Sailor Song", "At the Beach, in Every Life"), faith, religion, and grief ("Fable", "Crown", and "Survivor's Guilt", an instrumental interlude which leads directly into "Crown").

== Background ==
The album was initially announced by Perez on Instagram on April 14, 2025. The album is largely a tribute to her older sister Celene Perez, who died in 2020. In an interview with People, Perez said that she would've never been able to create the album "had I stayed where I was, and had I not gone independent".

== Critical reception ==
Professional ratings
Review scores
Source	Rating
AllMusic	3.5/5 stars

Marcy Donelson of AllMusic called the album a "set of mostly driving, upset songs, rather than quietly plaintive ones". Jem Aswad of Variety said that the album is "not a conventional debut album by any stretch".

== Track listing ==
At the Beach, in Every Life track listing
No.	Title	Writer(s)	Producer(s)	Length
1.	"Sailor Song"	Gianna Perez	Gigi Perez; Noah Weinman	3:31
2.	"Sleeping"	G. Perez	G. Perez; Weinman	3:52
3.	"Sugar Water"	G. Perez; Isabella Perez	G. Perez	5:03
4.	"Normalcy"	G. Perez	G. Perez; Weinman	5:38
5.	"Nothing, Absolutely"	G. Perez	G. Perez; Aidan Hobbs	3:45
6.	"Chemistry"	G. Perez; Aidan Hobbs; Ethan Gruska	G. Perez; Hobbs	4:44
7.	"Survivor's Guilt"	G. Perez; Hobbs	G. Perez; Hobbs	1:20
8.	"Crown"	G. Perez; Hobbs	G. Perez; Hobbs	4:46
9.	"Fable"	G. Perez	G. Perez	4:21
10.	"Please Be Rude"	G. Perez	G. Perez	3:00
11.	"Twister"	G. Perez	G. Perez; Weinman	2:44
12.	"At the Beach, in Every Life"	G. Perez	G. Perez; Weinman	3:57
Total length:				46:46

At the Beach, in Every Life digital extended edition track listing
No.	Title	Length
13.	"Sailor Song" (first draft 4.29.24)	3:42
Total length:		50:28

== Personnel ==
Credits adapted from Tidal.

- Gigi Perez – vocals, engineering (all tracks); guitar (tracks 1, 2, 5–8, 12); background vocals, bass, drum programming, percussion (1); programming (2, 5–8, 11, 12), keyboards (6–8)
- Matt Emonson – mixing
- Evan Sutton – mastering
- Noah Weinman – engineering (1, 2, 11, 12); drum programming, percussion, piano (1); bass (2, 5), programming (2, 11, 12), banjo (2, 11), guitar (2), keyboards (12)
- Isabella Perez – background vocals (3, 9)
- Aidan Hobbs – bass, keyboards, programming, engineering (5–8); drum programming (6–8), guitar (6–8), strings (7, 8)
- Brendan Osbourn – strings (7, 8)
- Celene Perez – background vocals (7)

== Charts ==
Chart performance for At the Beach, in Every Life
Chart (2025–2026)	Peak position
Australian Albums (ARIA)	60
Belgian Albums (Ultratop Flanders)	89
Canadian Albums (Billboard)	54
Dutch Albums (Album Top 100)	47
Irish Albums (IRMA)	77
New Zealand Albums (RMNZ)	38
Norwegian Albums (VG-lista)	36
Scottish Albums (Official Charts)	7
UK Albums (Official Charts)	99
US Billboard 200	63
US Americana/Folk Albums (Billboard)	7
US Top Rock & Alternative Albums (Billboard)	13

== Certifications ==
Certifications for At the Beach, in Every Life
Region	Certification	Certified units/sales
Belgium (BRMA)	Gold	10,000^{‡}
New Zealand (RMNZ)	Gold	7,500^{‡}
Poland (ZPAV)	Gold	15,000^{‡}
United States (RIAA)	Gold	500,000^{‡}
^{‡} Sales+streaming figures based on certification alone.
