= The Great Divide (Noah Kahan song) =

Single by Noah Kahan

from the album The Great Divide
- Released: January 30, 2026
- Studio: Guilford Sound, Vermont
- Genre: Folk rock
- Length: 5:17 (album version); 4:16 (radio edit)
- Label: Mercury
- Songwriters: Noah Kahan; Gabe Simon
- Producers: Noah Kahan; Gabe Simon

Noah Kahan singles chronology
"Up All Night" (2024)	"The Great Divide" (2026)	"Porch Light" (2026)

Music video
- "The Great Divide" on YouTube

"The Great Divide" is a song by American singer-songwriter Noah Kahan, released by Mercury Records on January 30, 2026, and appearing on the singer's fourth studio album of the same name. The song was written by Kahan and Gabe Simon, and recorded at Guilford Sound Studio in Vermont.

== Background ==
The song was unveiled live during Kahan's The Stick Season (We'll All Be Here Forever) Tour on April 13, 2024. In mid-January 2026, the singer shared a 36-second audio snippet on TikTok, sparking speculation that it was the long-awaited final version of the track. Meanwhile, production had undergone several changes since 2024. Ten days before its release, Kahan announced the song's release date and title on social media, "The Great Divide", as well as a new album of the same name that would be available on April 24, 2026. The announcement was accompanied by a video on Instagram with the message "Anything great is worth the wait".

Recorded at Guilford Sound Studio in Vermont, and written with his longtime collaborator Gabe Simon, the release marks Kahan's solo comeback after nearly three years out of the spotlight. Speaking about the song, Kahan said: "A lot of my life recently has been realizing the things I wish I could have said to people and the things I wish I could have done differently, and so this song is kind of just an expansion of that." Following the release, Kahan posted a photo of himself on Instagram with the message "We are aggressively back".

== Composition and lyrics ==
The song is about mental health, friendship, distance, and regret, recounting a particular moment in the singer's life when his career was at its peak, but personally, he was facing a rupture with his friends and family, and even with himself. Through the lyrics, Kahan expresses his guilt at not recognizing that one of his friends was going through a difficult time at a certain point, suffering from mental health issues and religious trauma. The song begins with a banjo melody, followed by guitar notes, and the first lyrics immediately evoke a former acquaintance Kahan has since lost touch with, before building to a crescendo.

== Music video ==
The music video premiered in partnership with Mastercard during a commercial break at the Grammy Awards on February 1, 2026. Shot in Nashville, Tennessee, by Parker Schmidt, it features Kahan, two young adults reliving their past, alongside scenes of the couple as children. The video evokes the grief and healing experienced during the transition to adulthood. It also includes numerous Easter eggs to songs from the singer's previous studio album, Stick Season (2022), as well as clues about his 2026 album, The Great Divide.

== Charts ==
=== Weekly charts ===
Chart performance
Chart (2026)	Peak position
Australia (ARIA)	15
Austria (Ö3 Austria Top 40)	61
Canada Hot 100 (Billboard)	2
Canada CHR/Top 40 (Billboard)	33
Canada Hot AC (Billboard)	21
Canada Mainstream Rock (Billboard Canada)	24
Canada Modern Rock (Billboard Canada)	1
Germany Airplay (MusicTrace)	83
Global 200 (Billboard)	10
Ireland (IRMA)	1
Latvia Airplay (LaIPA)	19
Lithuania Airplay (TopHit)	94
Netherlands (Single Top 100)	86
New Zealand (Recorded Music NZ)	13
New Zealand Airplay (RCS)	17
Norway (VG-lista)	95
Portugal (AFP)	121
South Africa Streaming (TOSAC)	90
Sweden (Sverigetopplistan)	64
Switzerland (Schweizer Hitparade)	66
Switzerland Airplay (MusicTrace)	47
UK Singles (Official Charts)	10
US Billboard Hot 100	6
US Adult Contemporary (Billboard)	15
US Adult Pop Airplay (Billboard)	15
US Hot Rock & Alternative Songs (Billboard)	1
US Pop Airplay (Billboard)	17
US Rock & Alternative Airplay (Billboard)	2

=== Monthly charts ===
Monthly chart performance
Chart (2026)	Peak position
Latvia Airplay (TopHit)	75

== Certifications ==
Region	Certification	Certified units/sales
Canada (Music Canada)	2× Platinum	160,000^{‡}
New Zealand (RMNZ)	Gold	15,000^{‡}
United Kingdom (BPI)	Gold	400,000^{‡}
^{‡} Sales+streaming figures based on certification alone.

== Release history ==
Release dates and formats for "The Great Divide"
Region	Date	Format	Label(s)	Ref.
United States	February 17, 2026	Contemporary hit radio	Mercury	
