= Annabelle Dinda =

American folk singer-songwriter (born 2000)

- Born: November 14, 2000 (age 25); Wayne, Pennsylvania, U.S.
- Genres: Folk; Rock
- Occupation: Singer-songwriter
- Instruments: Vocals; Guitar
- Years active: 2019–present
- Publishers: The Orchard; Sony Music Entertainment; Universal Music Group
- Website: annabelledinda.com

Annabelle Claire Dinda (/dɪndə/; born November 14, 2000) is an American indie folk musician from Wayne, Pennsylvania, now based in Manhattan, New York. She is mainly known for her breakthrough single, "The Hand", which was first previewed on her TikTok page just a month before its eventual release in November 2025. Her 2026 album, Some Things Never Leave, was her first album that received major attention from critics and new fans.

== Personal life ==
Annabelle Dinda was born in Wayne, Pennsylvania with two older brothers, John and Henry Dinda. From age 10, she had been practicing and writing music and receiving inspiration from artists like Ingrid Michelson and Sara Bareilles. Dinda attended Radnor High School. In 2021, Dinda graduated from the NYU Gallatin studying "storytelling through the lens of music and language," however, Dinda stated she "despised" her time taking those classes.

== Career ==
In 2019, Dinda released her first song on SoundCloud, titled "Is That How Love Always Ends". She put out more singles in 2019 and released a debut album, Nostalgion, on January 19, 2020. She released two more albums completely independently before making a TikTok account in June 2025, which started her rise to fame.

In 2024, Dinda's brother, John, passed away at the age of 29, which inspired most of the songs from her album released in the same year titled "Sixth Sense." The album follows themes of grief and time, and almost all of the songs were written within a three month timespan of John's unexpected death.

In November 2025, Dinda released the lead single, "The Hand" from her fourth album, Some Things Never Leave. The song amassed over one million likes in the first few weeks on her TikTok page. Dinda supported Noah Kahan on his 2026 headlining tour, The Great Divide Tour as an opening act, along with folk/alt-pop artist Gigi Perez.

== Discography ==
=== Studio albums ===
List of studio albums, with selected details
Title	Details
Nostalgion	Released: January 19, 2020; Format: Digital download, streaming; Distributor: CD Baby
Sad Songs For Dancing	Released: January 30, 2022; Format: Digital download, streaming; Distributor: CD Baby
Sixth Sense	Released: November 24, 2024; Format: Digital download, streaming; Distributor: CD Baby
Some Things Never Leave	Released: January 30, 2026; Format: Digital download, streaming; Distributor: The Orchard

Extended plays (EP)

- From The Drought (2022)
- I Pretend (2023)
- ME-P (2025)

Singles

- "Is That How Love Always Ends" (2019)
- "All On Me" (2019)
- "July" (2019)
- "Every Morning" (2019)
- "Greek Chorus" (2019)
- "Cereal Boxes" (2019)
- "Yesterdays" (2021)
- "Busy Girl (Bedlam)" (2023)
- "Spill" (2023)
- "Isn't This So Fun?" (2023)
- "Fictional States of Distress" (2025)
- "Good Things" (2025)
- "Logging Field" (2025)
- "The Hand" (2025)
- "Whatever You Wanna" (2026)
