= Dashboard (Noah Kahan song) =

2026 song by Noah Kahan

Song by Noah Kahan

from the album The Great Divide
- Released: April 24, 2026
- Genre: Folk; heartland rock
- Length: 3:50
- Label: Mercury
- Songwriters: Noah Kahan; Amy Allen; Carrie K; Gabe Simon
- Producers: Kahan; Simon

"Dashboard" is a song by American singer-songwriter Noah Kahan from his fourth studio album The Great Divide (2026). He wrote the song with Amy Allen, Carrie K and Gabe Simon and produced it with Simon.

== Composition and lyrics ==
"Dashboard" is a folk-leaning, heartland rock song. It opens with a "sparse, gentle" acoustic guitar, with a gradual introduction of electric guitar. The lyrics explore themes of self-hatred and the difficulty of maintaining friendships amid a meteoric rise to fame, as Noah Kahan sings from the perspective of an old friend who resents his success. The narrator lambasts him for abandoning them and centers on the idea that fame and relocation do not necessarily change one's character. Kahan uses imagery around driving and cars ("Just when you think that the road's straight ahead / When the devil shows up on your dashboard again").

The song is widely interpreted as being antimonious to Kahan's earlier song "You're Gonna Go Far," which was released as an extra track on the We'll All Be Here Forever edition of his 2022 album Stick Season. In this previous track, Kahan portrays a bittersweet-yet-supportive conception of a companion leaving town to pursue their ambitions, including the lyrics "We ain't angry at you, love / You're the greatest thing we've lost" and "It makes me smile to know when things get hard... You'll be far from here." In comparison, "Dashboard" explores the anger and pain of those left behind, lamenting that the subject's attempts to build a new life does not truly change their identity. In discussing the devil's reappearance on the dashboard, Kahan suggests that the companion will never truly find peace in their new lives, and will always be faced with an impulse to keep moving and reconstructing themselves.

== Critical reception ==
Lyndsey Havens of Billboard placed "Dashboard" at number 16 in her ranking of the songs from The Great Divide. Nicole Fell of The Hollywood Reporter described the song as "catchy, addictive and full of his signature lyrical one-liners" and regarded the chorus as a highlight of the song and album. Casey Epstein-Gross of Paste criticized the song for repeating themes and sentiments from earlier tracks, writing "Bafflingly, 'Dashboard' decides to make it a hat-trick, becoming the third song in a row to crucify Kahan for leaving town and finding fame, and doing it in the exact same way".

== Charts ==
Chart performance for "Dashboard"
Chart (2026)	Peak position
Australia (ARIA)	29
Canada Hot 100 (Billboard)	14
Global 200 (Billboard)	37
New Zealand (Recorded Music NZ)	23
UK Audio Streaming (Official Charts)	40
US Billboard Hot 100	19
US Hot Rock & Alternative Songs (Billboard)	6

== Certifications ==
Certifications for "Dashboard"
Region	Certification	Certified units/sales
Canada (Music Canada)	Gold	40,000^{‡}
^{‡} Sales+streaming figures based on certification alone.
