= End of August =

2026 song by Noah Kahan

Song by Noah Kahan

from the album The Great Divide
- Released: April 24, 2026
- Genre: Folk rock; Americana
- Length: 5:17
- Label: Mercury
- Songwriters: Noah Kahan; Aaron Dessner
- Producers: Kahan; Dessner; Gabe Simon

"End of August" is a song by American singer-songwriter Noah Kahan, released on April 24, 2026 from his fourth studio album The Great Divide. Kahan and Aaron Dessner wrote the song and produced it with Gabe Simon.

== Composition ==
The song begins with ambient sounds of bugs buzzing. It is a piano ballad, which is described as "gentle, twinkling" and capturing the intimate tone of the song. The lyrics find Noah Kahan lamenting that summer is ending soon and depict him driving into his home state of Vermont. He mentions his brothers, seeing cars with New York license plates and reaching Interstate 89. He points out that although his angst cannot be healed by his memories or medicine (which he considers to stop taking for this reason), it is what makes him feel alive. Kahan additionally describes his hometown as a place where most people "grow up and have kids who build homes for the rich", implying he is different from them. Throughout the song, he makes references to his previous album Stick Season.

== Critical reception ==
The song received generally positive reviews. Lyndsey Havens of Billboard ranked it as the second best song from The Great Divide and considered it a "fitting start" for the album, "as it seems a similar feeling shadowed Kahan's rise through Stick Season — and now that it is over, he can finally try to make sense of it all." Maxim Mower of Holler remarked "The way the hook builds is stunning, and it's refreshing to hear Kahan singing across some pared-down keys, rather than his usual guitar-led backing." Jon Dolan of Rolling Stone described the song as a "beautifully forlorn folk-rock epiphany." Reviewing the album for Clash, Robin Murray wrote "He starts strong with previously-teased 'End Of August', the opener of the record, which is still remarkably fresh. With undertones that mimic the known sadness of his repertoire, the slight eeriness brings an odd wave of happiness, which allows the track to shine." Hannah Jocelyn of Pitchfork commented "Knowing that Kahan is capable of a song like 'August' just makes the more pro forma arrangements on the rest of the album more frustrating."

== Charts ==
Chart performance for "End of August"
Chart (2026)	Peak position
Australia (ARIA)	30
Canada Hot 100 (Billboard)	11
Global 200 (Billboard)	29
Ireland (IRMA)	27
New Zealand (Recorded Music NZ)	17
UK Singles (Official Charts)	68
US Billboard Hot 100	14
US Hot Rock & Alternative Songs (Billboard)	3

== Certifications ==
Certifications for "End of August"
Region	Certification	Certified units/sales
Canada (Music Canada)	Gold	40,000^{‡}
^{‡} Sales+streaming figures based on certification alone.
