= Porch Light =

2026 single by Noah Kahan

Single by Noah Kahan

from the album The Great Divide
- Released: March 13, 2026
- Genre: Folk-pop
- Length: 4:22
- Label: Mercury
- Songwriters: Noah Kahan; Aaron Dessner
- Producers: Kahan; Dessner; Gabe Simon

Noah Kahan singles chronology
"The Great Divide" (2026)	"Porch Light" (2026)	"Doors" (2026)

"Porch Light" is a song by American singer-songwriter Noah Kahan, released on March 13, 2026, as the second single from his fourth studio album, The Great Divide. Kahan wrote the song with Aaron Dessner, and produced it with Dessner and Gabe Simon of Kopecky.

== Background ==
According to Kahan, the song was inspired by the emotional weight that he felt he had placed on his family through opening up their lives on his previous album, Stick Season. He first previewed the song on the video-sharing app TikTok and then began performing it at concerts, debuting it live at the Out of the Blue Festival Pool Party in Cancún, Mexico in January 2025.

== Composition ==
The song contains a banjo-driven instrumental, over which Kahan sings from his mother's perspective. The narrative depicts her as resenting that Kahan has not returned to her since he achieved fame and refusing to forgive him. Despite her grudge, she confesses that she is lonely and simply misses him. She hopes for her son to return, with the chorus conveying the emotional impact of his absence.

== Charts ==
Chart performance for "Porch Light"
Chart (2026)	Peak position
Australia (ARIA)	27
Canada Hot 100 (Billboard)	10
Global 200 (Billboard)	31
Ireland (IRMA)	8
Latvia Airplay (TopHit)	91
Netherlands (Single Top 100)	83
New Zealand (Recorded Music NZ)	21
South Africa Streaming (TOSAC)	100
Sweden Heatseeker (Sverigetopplistan)	2
UK Singles (Official Charts)	19
US Billboard Hot 100	20
US Hot Rock & Alternative Songs (Billboard)	4

== Certifications ==
Certifications for "Porch Light"
Region	Certification	Certified units/sales
Canada (Music Canada)	Platinum	80,000^{‡}
New Zealand (RMNZ)	Gold	15,000^{‡}
^{‡} Sales+streaming figures based on certification alone.
