= Gigi Perez =

American singer-songwriter (born 2000)

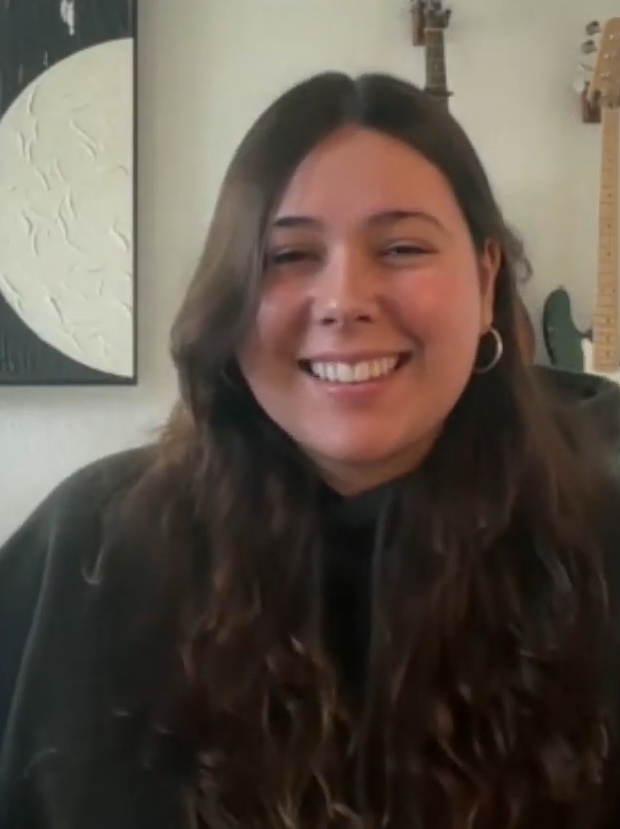
- Perez in January 2025

Background information
- Born: Gianna Brielle Perez; February 4, 2000 (age 26); Hackensack, New Jersey, U.S.
- Genres: Indie folk; indie pop
- Occupations: Singer-songwriter; musician
- Instruments: Vocals; guitar; piano
- Years active: 2018–present
- Labels: Mogul Vision; Interscope; Island
- Member of: Wendy Lane
- Website: gigiperezmusic.com

Gianna Brielle "Gigi" Perez (born February 4, 2000) is an American singer-songwriter. Born in Hackensack, New Jersey to Cuban parents and raised in West Palm Beach, Florida, she went viral on TikTok for her songs "Celene" and "Sometimes (Backwood)" and spent a period signed to Interscope Records, on which she released the 2023 EP How to Catch a Falling Knife. After leaving the label, she released "Sailor Song," which peaked at number 22 on the Billboard Hot 100. "Sailor Song" topped the charts in Ireland, Latvia, and the United Kingdom, and peaked within the top ten of the charts in various countries, including New Zealand and Norway. She has also supported artists such as Coldplay, Noah Cyrus, Girl in Red, Annabelle Dinda, Hozier and Noah Kahan on tour.

== Early life and education ==
Gianna Brielle Perez was born on February 4, 2000, in Hackensack, New Jersey to Cuban parents, and raised in West Palm Beach, Florida. She spent a year at a comprehensive before moving to a Christian school, The King's Academy, where she acted in musicals and was named 2017 homecoming queen. Perez is a lesbian and has credited "Girls Like Girls" by Hayley Kiyoko with helping her accept her sexuality.

She began writing songs at age fifteen and began releasing music in 2018 while in high school as part of the band Wendy Lane. Perez briefly attended Berklee College of Music in Boston but left during the COVID-19 pandemic. She had an older sister, Celene, who died in July 2020, shortly after which Perez's partner broke up with her.

== Career ==
To cope with the grief of losing her sister in 2020, Perez began uploading videos to TikTok. She went viral in early 2021 after uploading the song "Celene" to SoundCloud, then followed by "Sometimes (Backwood)", both of which gained traction on TikTok, which led to her signing with Interscope Records.

Perez released a further single, "The Man", in June 2022, a song that reflects on gender expectations within the queer community. She supported Coldplay on their Music of the Spheres World Tour later that month at their Florida stadium show. She has stated in interviews to have received the offer to do so on her 22nd birthday and in February 2022. She then released "When She Smiles", a song about a toxic relationship inspired by Ariana Grande, Imogen Heap, and "When Jamie Smiles" from the Ryan Reynolds film Just Friends, and "Glue", a track written in late 2020 about clinging to a relationship after bereavement. In October 2022, she supported Noah Cyrus on her The Hardest Part Tour and released "Figurines".

In February 2023, she supported D4vd on his The Root of It All Tour. In March, by which time she was based in Brooklyn, she released "Sally" and announced an EP, How to Catch a Falling Knife, which comprised eight songs composed three years earlier. The EP took its title from the stock market term "never try to catch a falling knife", as she felt it represented what she had put into the project, and was released in April 2023 alongside a music video for focus track "Kill for You".

In March 2024, after being released from Interscope Records, she released "Normalcy", a queer ballad she had first promoted in December 2022 on TikTok; she followed this two months later with "Please Be Rude".

In July 2024, she released the single "Sailor Song", an acoustic queer ballad about a woman who looked like Anne Hathaway. The track went viral on TikTok, and peaked at number 22 on the Billboard Hot 100. Some conservative Christian communities complained about the line "I don't believe in God, but I believe that you're my savior", prompting Perez to remind her followers that her songwriting was "not a democracy". She signed to Island Records in September 2024.

On April 25, 2025, Perez released her debut studio album, At the Beach, in Every Life through Island Records. At the Beach, In Every Life debuted at number 96 on the US Billboard 200 and charted internationally, reaching number 54 in Canada, 77 in Ireland, 36 in Norway, and 38 in New Zealand.

== Discography ==
=== Studio albums ===
Title	Studio album details	Peak chart positions										Certifications
Title	Studio album details	US	US Rock	AUS	BEL (FL)	CAN	IRE	NLD	NOR	NZ	UK	Certifications
At the Beach, in Every Life	Released: April 25, 2025; Label: Island; Format: LP, CD, digital download, streaming, cassette	63	12	60	89	54	77	47	36	38	99	RIAA: Gold; BRMA: Gold; RMNZ: Gold

=== Extended plays ===
Title	EP details
How to Catch a Falling Knife	Released: April 28, 2023; Label: Mogul Vision, Interscope; Format: Digital download, streaming

=== Singles ===
Title	Year	Peak chart positions										Certifications	Album
Title	Year	US	US Rock	AUS	CAN	IRE	NOR	NZ	SWE	UK	WW	Certifications	Album
"Sometimes (Backwood)"	2021	—	—	—	—	—	—	—	—	—	—	ARIA: Gold; MC: Gold	Non-album single
"The Man"	2022	—	—	—	—	—	—	—	—	—	—		How to Catch a Falling Knife
"When She Smiles"	2022	—	—	—	—	—	—	—	—	—	—		How to Catch a Falling Knife
"Glue"	2022	—	—	—	—	—	—	—	—	—	—		How to Catch a Falling Knife
"Figurines"	2022	—	—	—	—	—	—	—	—	—	—		How to Catch a Falling Knife
"Sally"	2023	—	—	—	—	—	—	—	—	—	—		How to Catch a Falling Knife
"Normalcy"	2024	—	—	—	—	—	—	—	—	—	—		At the Beach, in Every Life
"Please Be Rude"	2024	—	—	—	—	—	—	—	—	—	—		At the Beach, in Every Life
"Sailor Song"	2024	22	3	8	16	1	3	3	5	1	10	RIAA: 4× Platinum; ARIA: 4× Platinum; BPI: 3× Platinum; IFPI SWE: Platinum; MC: 4× Platinum; RMNZ: 4× Platinum	At the Beach, in Every Life
"Fable"	2024	—	19	—	—	55	—	— (Note: "Fable" did not enter the NZ Top 40 Singles Chart, but peaked at number six on the NZ Hot Singles Chart.)	—	55	—	RIAA: Gold; ARIA: Gold; BPI: Silver; RMNZ: Gold	At the Beach, in Every Life
"Chemistry"	2025	—	36	—	—	—	—	— (Note: "Chemistry" did not enter the NZ Top 40 Singles Chart, but peaked at number 23 on the NZ Hot Singles Chart.)	—	— (Note: "Chemistry" did not enter the Official Singles Chart, but peaked at number 89 on the Official Singles Chart Update.)	—		At the Beach, in Every Life
"At the Beach, in Every Life"	2025	—	—	—	—	—	—	— (Note: "At the Beach, in Every Life" did not enter the NZ Top 40 Singles Chart, but peaked at number 19 on the NZ Hot Singles Chart.)	—	—	—		At the Beach, in Every Life
"In the Middle" (Mt. Joy featuring Gigi Perez)	2025	—	—	—	—	—	—	31	—	—	—		Hope We Have Fun
"Eternity" (Alex Warren featuring Gigi Perez)	2025	—	—	—	—	—	—	—	—	—	—		Non-album single
"Icarus" (Mumford & Sons featuring Gigi Perez)	2026	—	—	—	—	—	—	—	—	—	—		Prizefighter
"Collide" (Hayley Kiyoko with Gigi Perez)	2026	—	—	—	—	—	—	—	—	—	—		Girls Like Girls
"Favor"	2026	—	—	—	—	—	—	— (Note: "Favor" did not enter the NZ Top 40 Singles Chart, but peaked at number 19 on the NZ Hot Singles Chart.)	—	—	—		The Hunger Games: Sunrise on the Reaping
"—" denotes a recording that did not chart or was not released in that territory.

==== As part of Wendy Lane ====
Title	Year	Album
"Dreams"	2018	Non-album singles
"February Face"	2018	Non-album singles
"Vertigo"	2020	Non-album singles
"Witches"	2022	Non-album singles

=== Music videos ===
Title	Year	Director	Ref.
"The Man"	2022	Amber Padgett & Open The Portal	
"When She Smiles"	2022	Svenja Krautwurst	
"Sally"	2023	Leaf Lieber	
"Kill for You"	2023	Leaf Lieber	
"Sailor Song"	2024	Coco Mendez	
"At the Beach, In Every Life"	2025	Coco Mendez	
"Sleeping"	2025	Coco Mendez	
