= Cultural impact of Coldplay =

Influence of British band

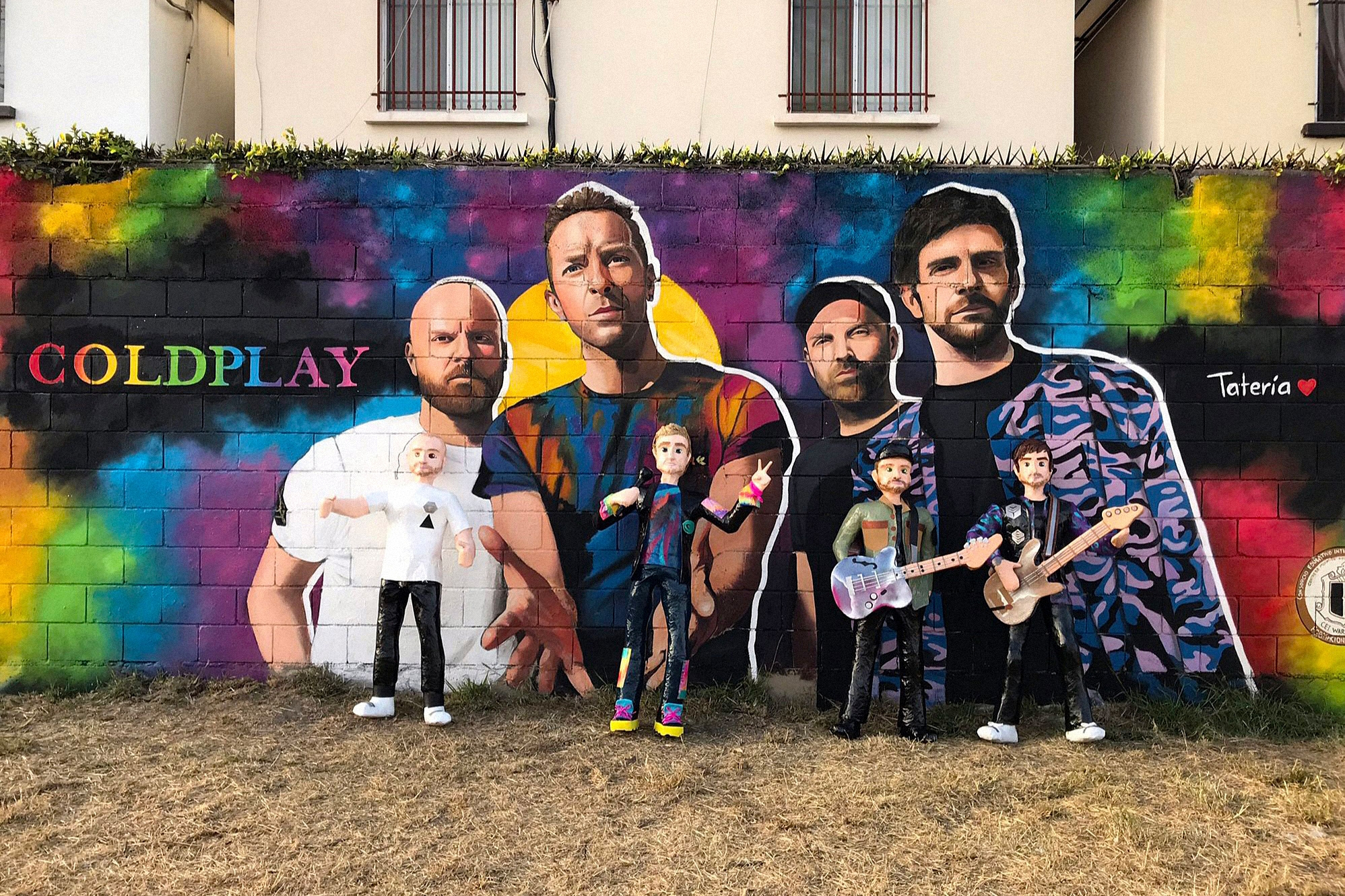
Coldplay artworks in Monterrey, Mexico, in 2022

British rock band Coldplay have made a significant impact on popular culture with their music, artistry, identity, performances, and commercial achievements worldwide. They were formed in London by Chris Martin (vocals, piano), Jonny Buckland (lead guitar), Guy Berryman (bass guitar), Will Champion (drums, percussion) and Phil Harvey (management). After signing a record contract with Parlophone in 1999 and releasing Parachutes in the following year, the group progressively accumulated fame, success and public interest throughout their career, becoming cultural icons and one of the most influential artists of the 21st century. Moreover, Coldplay have been often described by media outlets as successors to U2 as the biggest band in the world. (Note: As per The Guardian, The New York Times, Stereogum, and The Telegraph.)

The group were also credited with ushering "in a fresh timbre of songwriting" during a time British music "struggled to define itself" and "bringing the sound of mainstream rock towards something more gentle and melodic", while their musical reinventions allowed them to enjoy success in the post-album era and the streaming age; expand the roster of acts inspired by them; and create "a rich multi-genre legacy". This crossover appeal can be evidenced in styles like sertanejo and hip hop, the former through songwriting and the latter with how acts frequently sample and reference their works.

Coldplay's polarising image has been a subject of analysis in multiple publications as well, paving the way for musicians with a similar profile. Furthermore, they have impacted arena rock shows by making their fans a focal point, which included using interactive LED wristbands worn by attendees and endorsing accessibility efforts. With the Music of the Spheres World Tour (2022–2025), the band pioneered sustainability in live entertainment, reducing CO_{2} emissions by 59% relative to their previous concert run. Time ranked them among the most impactful climate action leaders in the world as a result. Additionally, Coldplay's commercial success led them to achieve economic power in the music industry, uplifting British music global exports and instigating debates on the viability of streaming services. The band were also praised for their marketing tactics, with their use of the Internet for promotional purposes being considered revolutionary in the early 21st century. As another example of their legacy, Coldplay have spawned various tribute albums, events and acts.

== Musicianship ==
=== Reshaping rock music ===
Thanks to more hits like "Yellow" and a rigorous touring schedule, Coldplay became as big in the US as they were in the UK, not only helping to reestablish common artistic ground between the two countries but bringing the sound of mainstream rock towards something more gentle and melodic than distorted and aggressive. Eventually, major labels stopped looking for the new Nirvana or the new Radiohead and started looking for the new Coldplay.

— Spectrum Culture, 2020

Coldplay are considered one of the most influential groups of the 21st century. According to Steve Baltin from Forbes, they have become the standard for the contemporary alternative scene, while their "consistent performing and adventuresome work" led them grow "into one of the finest live bands in all of music". Afisha's Sergey Stepanov defended that they inherited the ability to make alternative rock mainstream from U2 and regarded them as "the Beatles of the 21st century" for their hit-making talent and potential heft. Lizzie Manno wrote for Paste that Coldplay's rise from small venues to arenas before A Rush of Blood to the Head (2002) evolved into an unthinkable phenomenon for bands during the 2010s and 2020s.

Moreover, she said they left a "huge mark on radio rock" for years to come and inspired the "subsequent wave of pop rock", citing Bastille, Civil Twilight, Hozier, Keane, Kodaline and the Script as examples. While discussing key events in the genre's history for The Guardian, Kitty Empire stated that British music "struggled to define itself" with the end of britpop until Coldplay introduced a "fresh timbre of songwriting" which had "yearning melancholy, buoyed by a sense of uplift". Similarly, the band were credited with introducing piano-driven soft rock to the new millennium.

Jon O'Brien from the Recording Academy sustained in his 20th anniversary review of Parachutes (2000) that the album "ushered in a new wave of mild-mannered guitar bands" and opened "the floodgates for those who didn't subscribe to the Rock N' Roll Star way of thinking". He also noticed that several bands formed before Coldplay adopted a similar guitar template afterwards. The Telegraph's Neil McCormick argued that they represent "a new musical era, adapting to technological and stylistic change and emotional and sociological shifts, creating rock that is empathic, inclusive and in tune with the social constructs of post-millennial youth culture". Tom Breihan of Stereogum lauded them for unifying the genre following the decline of nu metal and post-grunge. La Repubblica writer Carlo Moretti declared that the band shaped alternative rock with the melancholy of Parachutes, reinvented symphonic rock with the grandeur of Viva la Vida or Death and All His Friends (2008) and conquered arena rock with the energy of Mylo Xyloto (2011).

=== Crossover appeal ===
Coldplay have ventured into several different genres over the years, to which music critics assigned varying degrees of creative success. Media outlets associated their enduring relevance to how they are capable of being "experimental with their sound and incorporate modern signifiers" while still retaining their prestige as a "reliably epic" stadium act. This musical heterogeneity is also said to have allowed them to "transcend the trappings" of most alternative rock outfits and enjoy further commercial success in the post-album era and the streaming age. Charles Marcos from El País observed that "we would surely have forgotten about [the band] by now", had they insisted on the same formula and created other albums similar to Parachutes (2000). Writing for Firstpost, Lakshmi Govindrajan Javeri stressed it is difficult to explain Coldplay's sound and concluded their ability to "morph into different soundscapes" forged a multi-genre legacy. Barbara Fuchs opined that they "shaped contemporary pop music beyond all short-lived trends" on Falter.

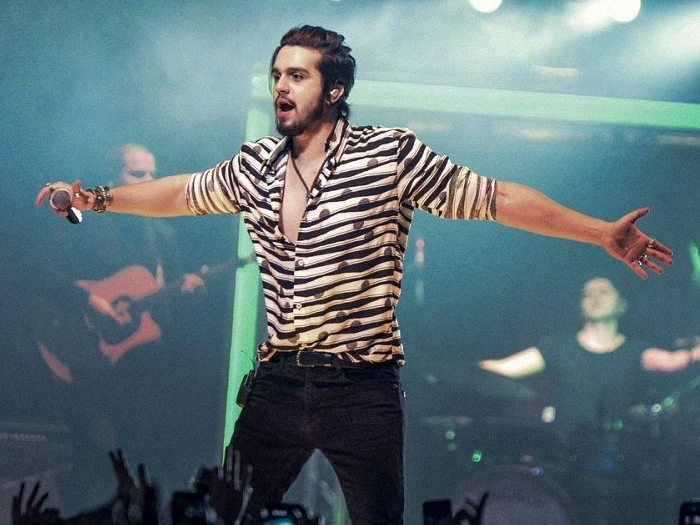
Luan Santana (pictured in 2016) is among the sertanejo acts influenced by Coldplay in Brazil

Aside from impacting the styles they have explored, Coldplay were instrumental in reshaping parts of Brazilian sertanejo, as reported by G1's Carol Prado. She cited Luan Santana to illustrate her point and affirmed the genre was noticeably inspired by their "strong choruses, with elongated syllables and passages perfect for singing in stadiums". Prado also noted the band are a key reference for the sertanejos closer to a pop rock identity. Lucas Lucco and Matheus & Kauan have both mentioned them as an influence, while the arrangements of Victor & Leo's "Caminhos Diferentes" were suggested to draw directly from their discography.

While addressing the use of rock samples in hip hop, Pitchfork claimed that Coldplay achieved a rarefied status when it comes to groups that are loved by rappers. Christina Lee from BuzzFeed News said Martin's duets with Kanye West and Jay-Z are one of the explanations for the sentiment, although Swizz Beatz had previously sampled the band. In 2013, Mike Will Made It pointed out that his production for Miley Cyrus' "My Darlin" was meant to sound anthemic and reminiscent of Coldplay. Similarly, Future has listed "Paradise" among his favourite songs and mentioned being inspired by how Martin expresses his words through melody. Writing for Grantland, Amos Barshad stated that Coldplay's success can be measured based on the rate at which rappers seek to repurpose their tracks.

American acts from the genre who sampled them include Black Cobain, B.o.B, Joe Budden, Chance the Rapper, eMC, Pac Div, Rockie Fresh, Shawty Lo and Trae. In 2009, Canadian rapper Drake incorporated elements of "Viva la Vida" into "Congratulations". France's Disiz and La Fouine integrated Coldplay in "Auto-Dance" ("Death and All His Friends") and "Papa" ("Lost!"). The band also had their songs used by musicians in country (Keith Urban), electronic (Girl Talk), and pop (Lizzo). Defector noticed that the R&B scene of the 21st century was indebted "to the moody atmospherics of alternative bands like Radiohead, Coldplay or My Bloody Valentine". Brandy interpolated "Sparks" and excerpted "Clocks" in her album Afrodisiac (2004). Frank Ocean recorded an alternative version of "Strawberry Swing" for his debut mixtape Nostalgia, Ultra (2011).

=== Sobriquet and accolades ===
Coldplay (pictured in 2005) at the National Portrait Gallery

Having secured numerous accolades in recognition of their impact across the music industry, Coldplay are often labelled as successors to U2 as the biggest band in the world. News organisations including Cleveland, Parade, and Radio X have rated them among the best groups in music history. They also featured on VH1's 100 Greatest Artists of All Time series, which honoured acts based on a poll of experts. In 2005, Coldplay were added to the National Portrait Gallery of the United Kingdom, an institution responsible for housing portrait collections of historically important British citizens. Four years later, they won an NRJ Award of Honour in celebration of their legacy. NME followed suit in 2016, recognising them with a Godlike Genius Award, which is dedicated to entertainment icons "who have been pioneers in the industry".

Coldplay members have been acknowledged individually as well: The Independent and Evening Standard dubbed Martin one of the most influential public figures in entertainment, while Champion has received an honorary degree as Doctor of Music from the University of Southampton. Q listed Parachutes (2000), A Rush of Blood to the Head (2002), X&Y (2005), Viva la Vida or Death and All His Friends (2008) and Mylo Xyloto (2011) among the best albums released in the 21st century. The second was additionally issued as a Royal Mail souvenir stamp, then placed in the definitive rankings of the Rock and Roll Hall of Fame and Rolling Stone.

Aggregating the 500 Greatest Songs of All Time, the magazine originally included "Clocks" at number 490. However, it was changed to "Fix You" in the 2020s decade update, at number 392. NME picked "The Scientist" (448) and "Yellow" (420) for their version of the list. The latter was part of Rock and Roll Hall of Fame's Songs That Shaped Rock and Roll exhibit, organised by music critics and specialised historians as a tribute to the most popular and influential recordings in the genre. Decade-end honours were presented to "Viva la Vida", "Every Teardrop Is a Waterfall", "Paradise", and "A Sky Full of Stars" as well. Moreover, Coldplay received a star at the First Avenue in Minneapolis, while The Telegraph and Yardbarker praised them as one of the best headliners in history at Glastonbury and Coachella. In 2024, Dorian Lynskey of the BBC News wrote a piece arguing that they are the defining band of the 21st century.

=== Creative inspiration ===
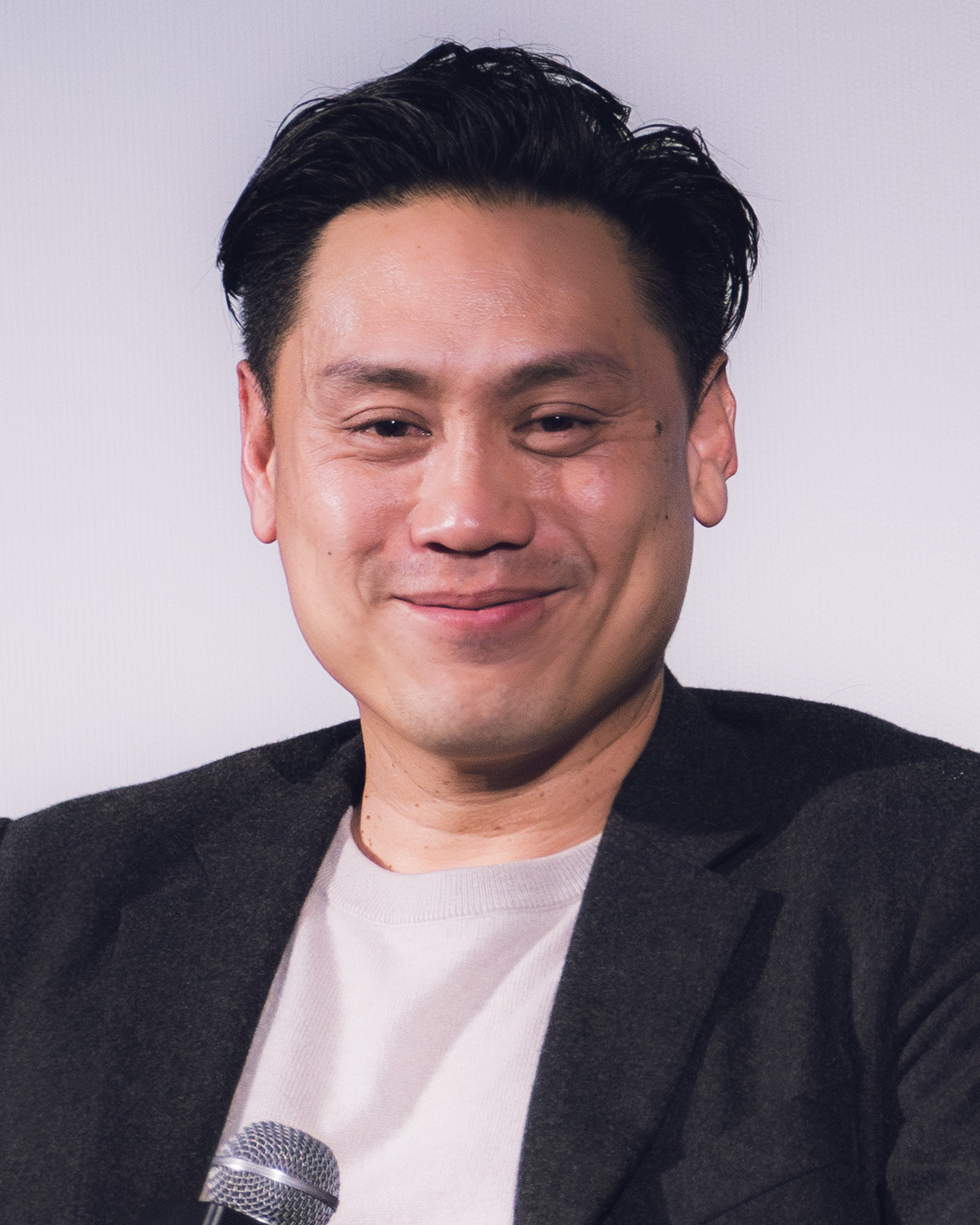
Jon M. Chu

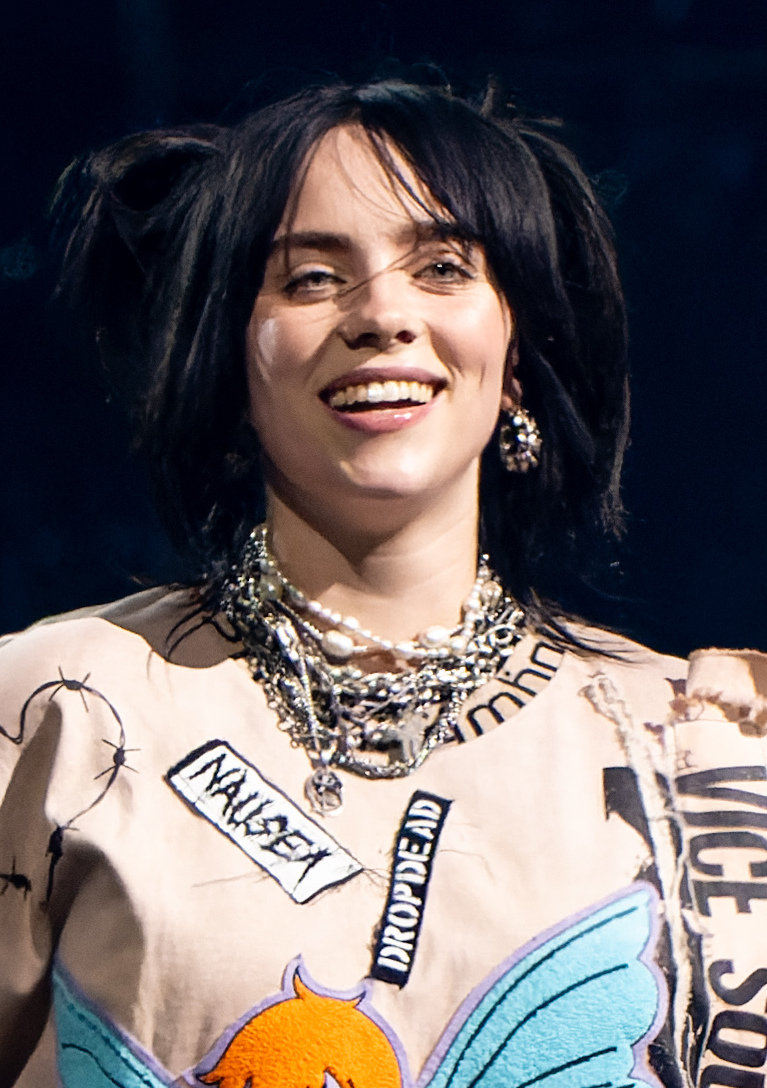
Billie Eilish

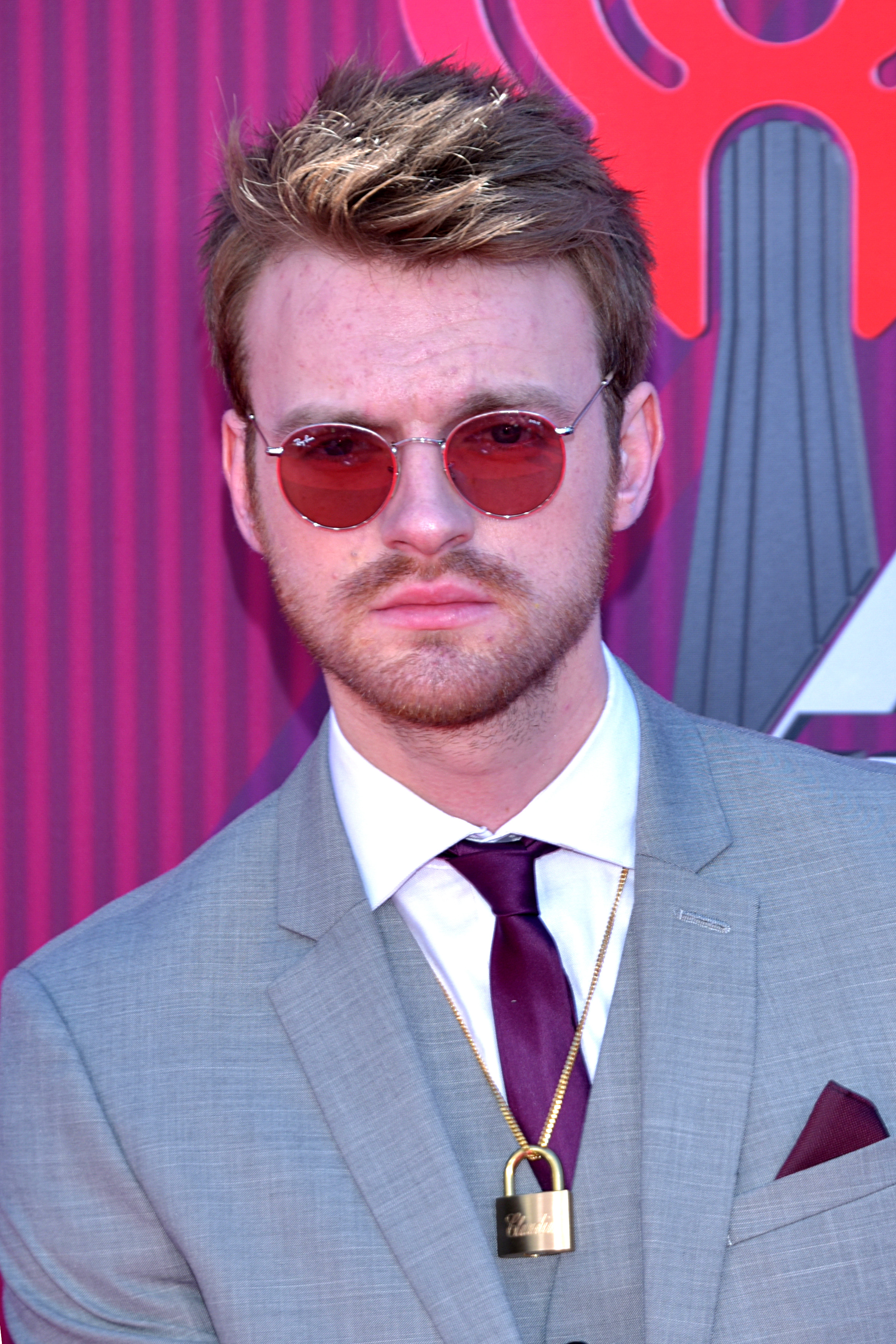
Finneas

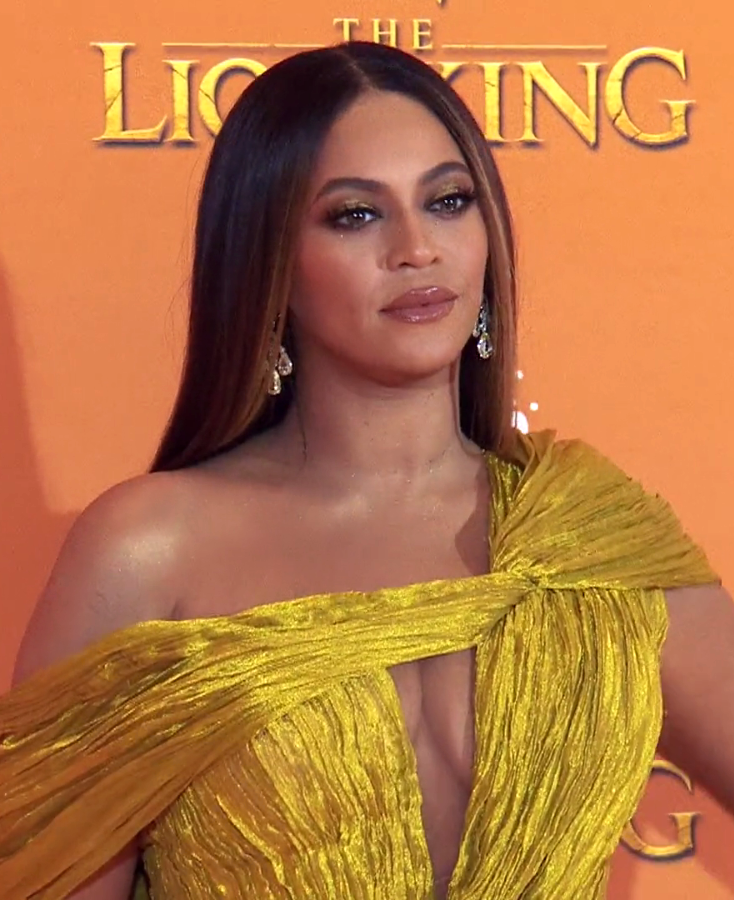
Beyoncé

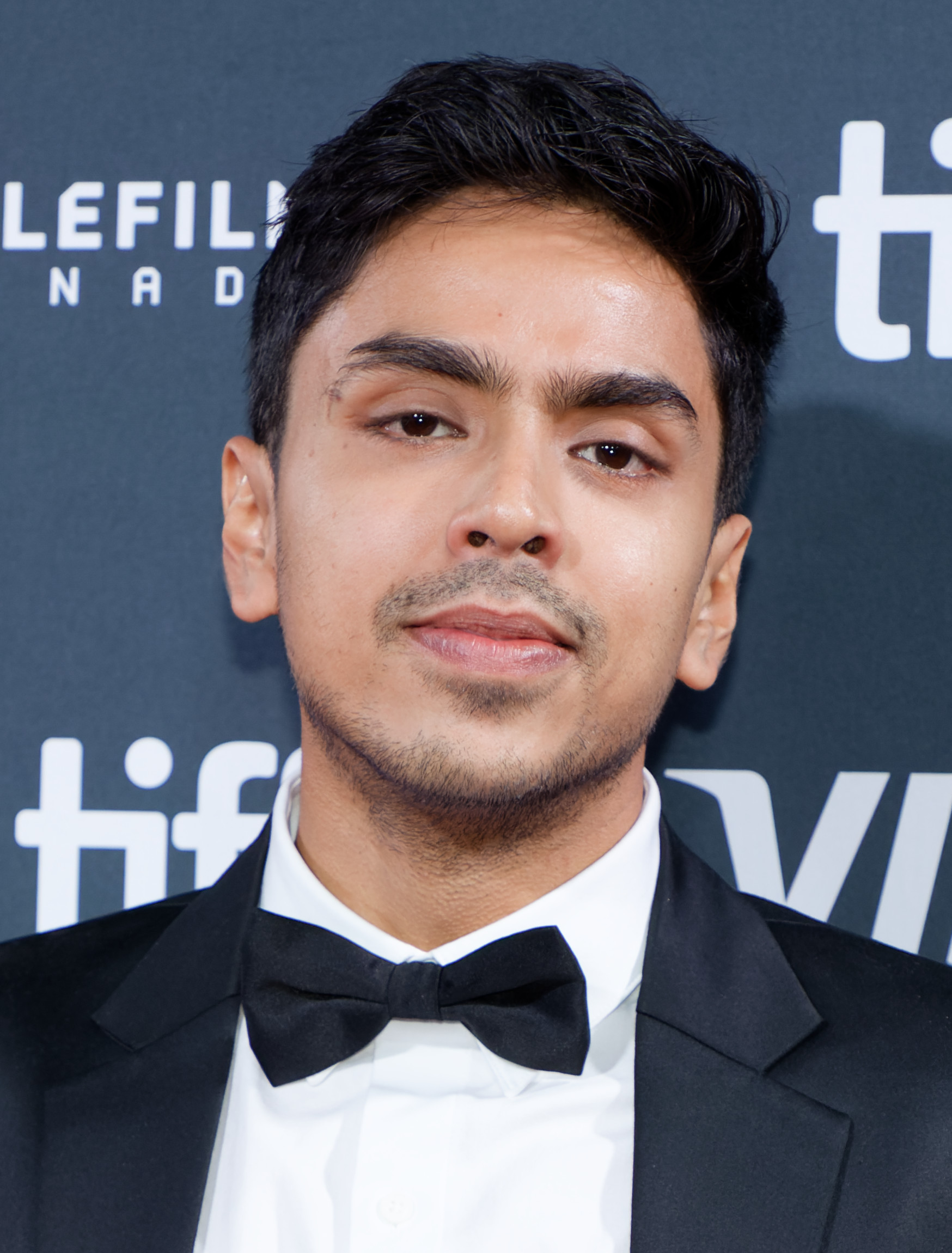
Adarsh Gourav

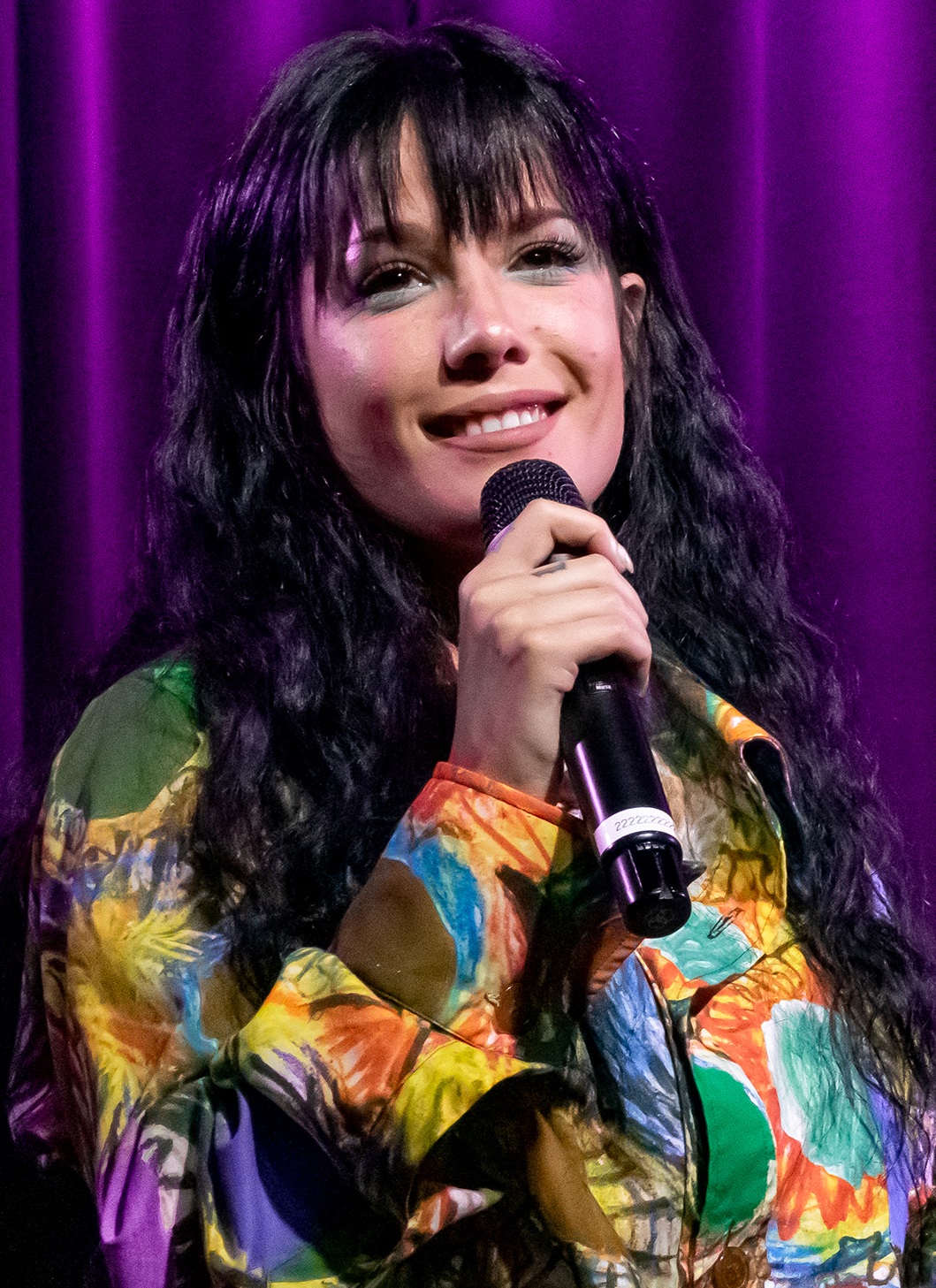
Halsey

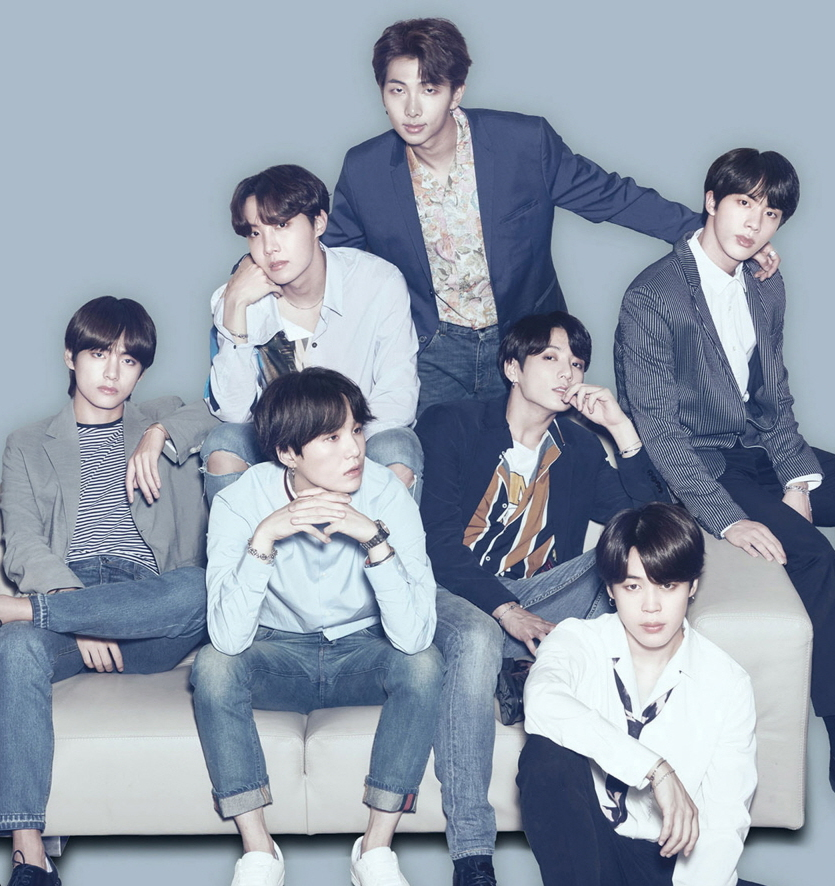
BTS

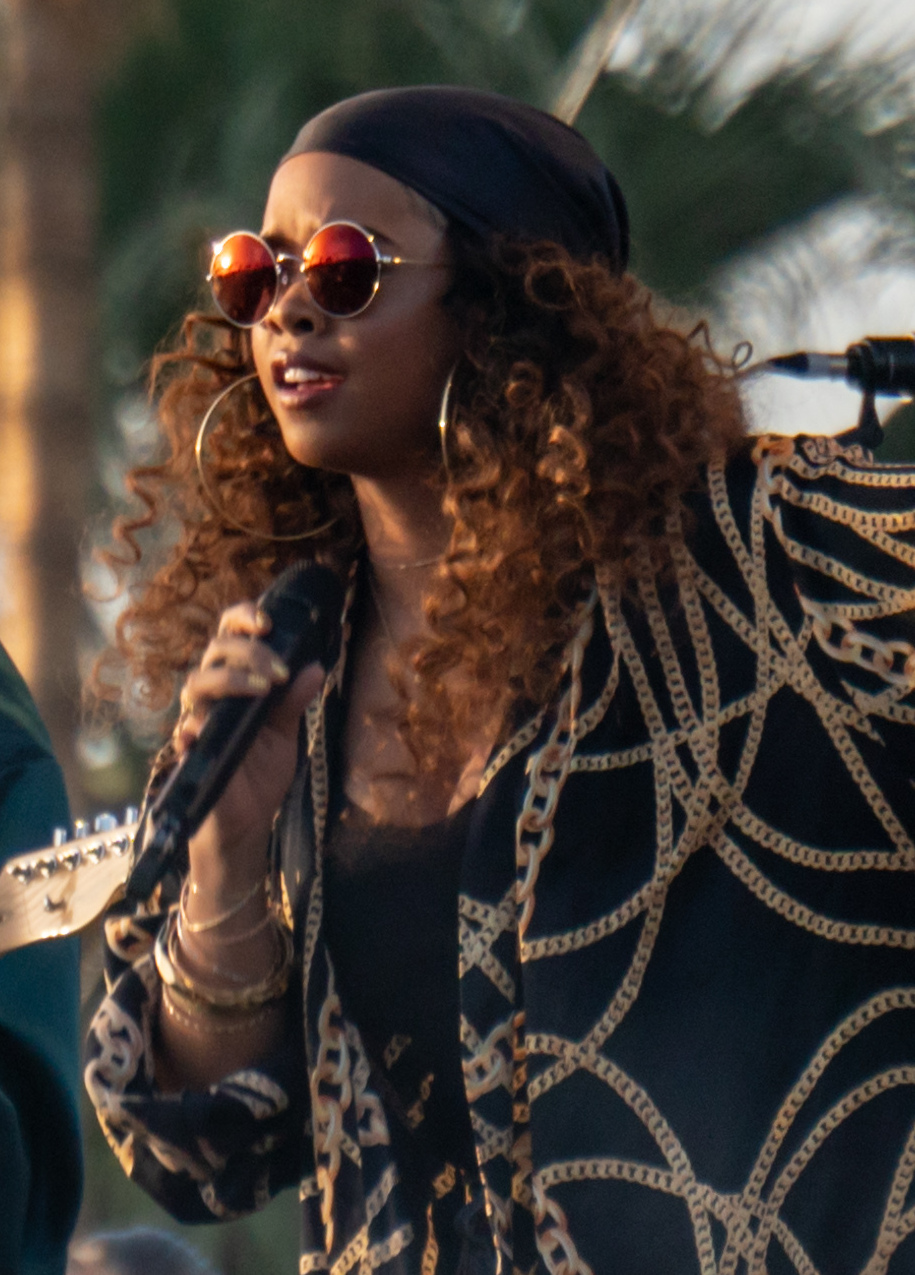
H.E.R.

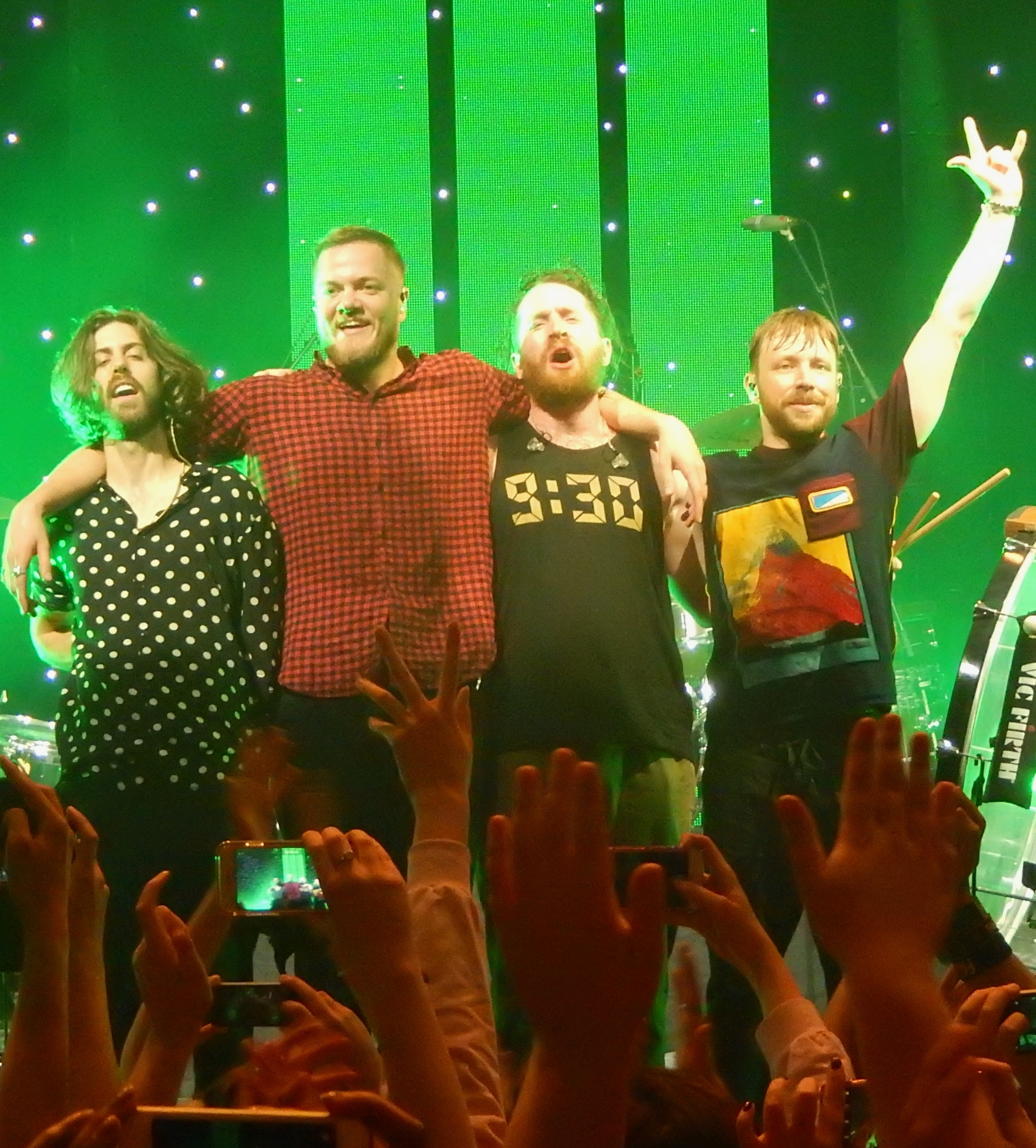
Imagine Dragons

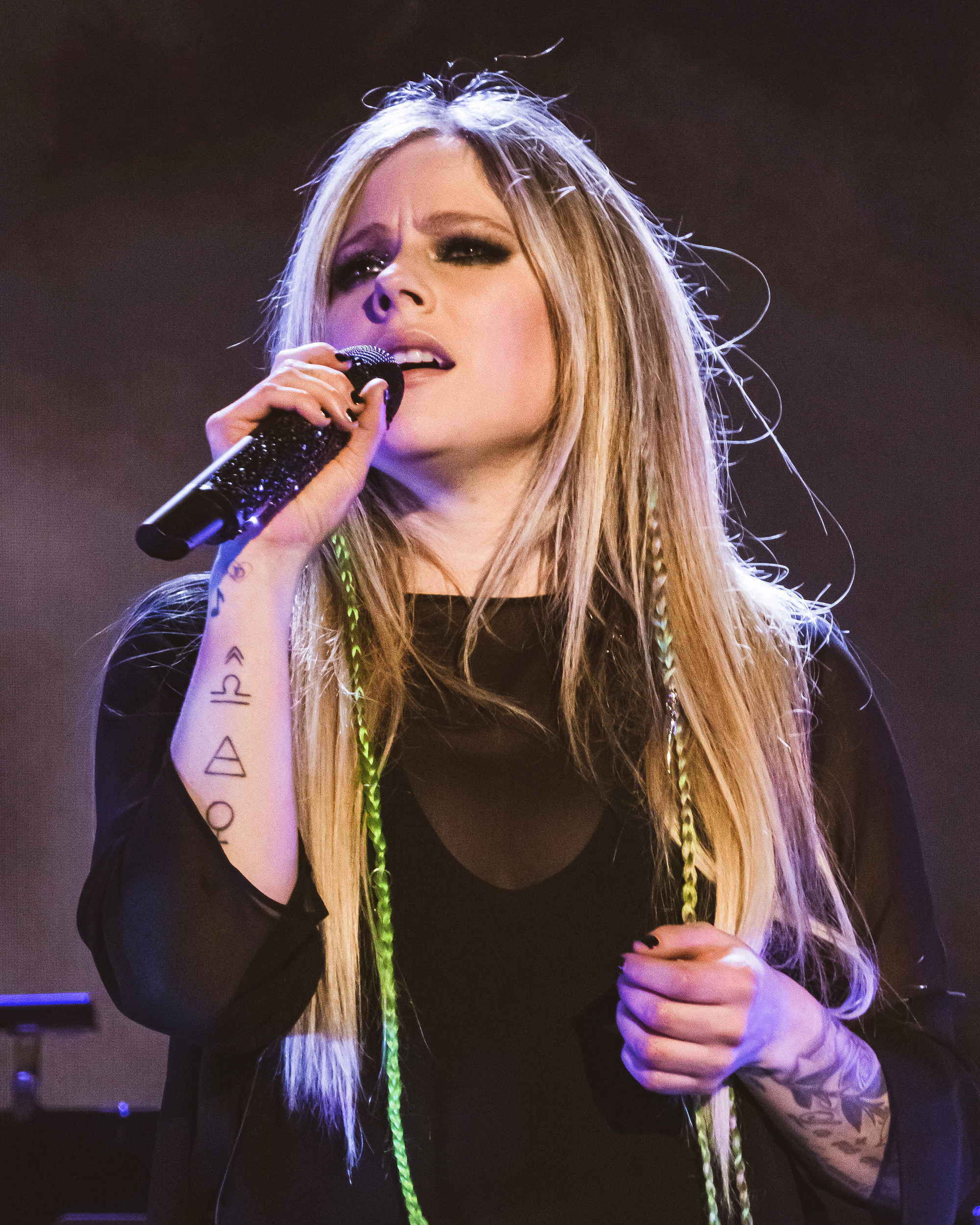
Avril Lavigne

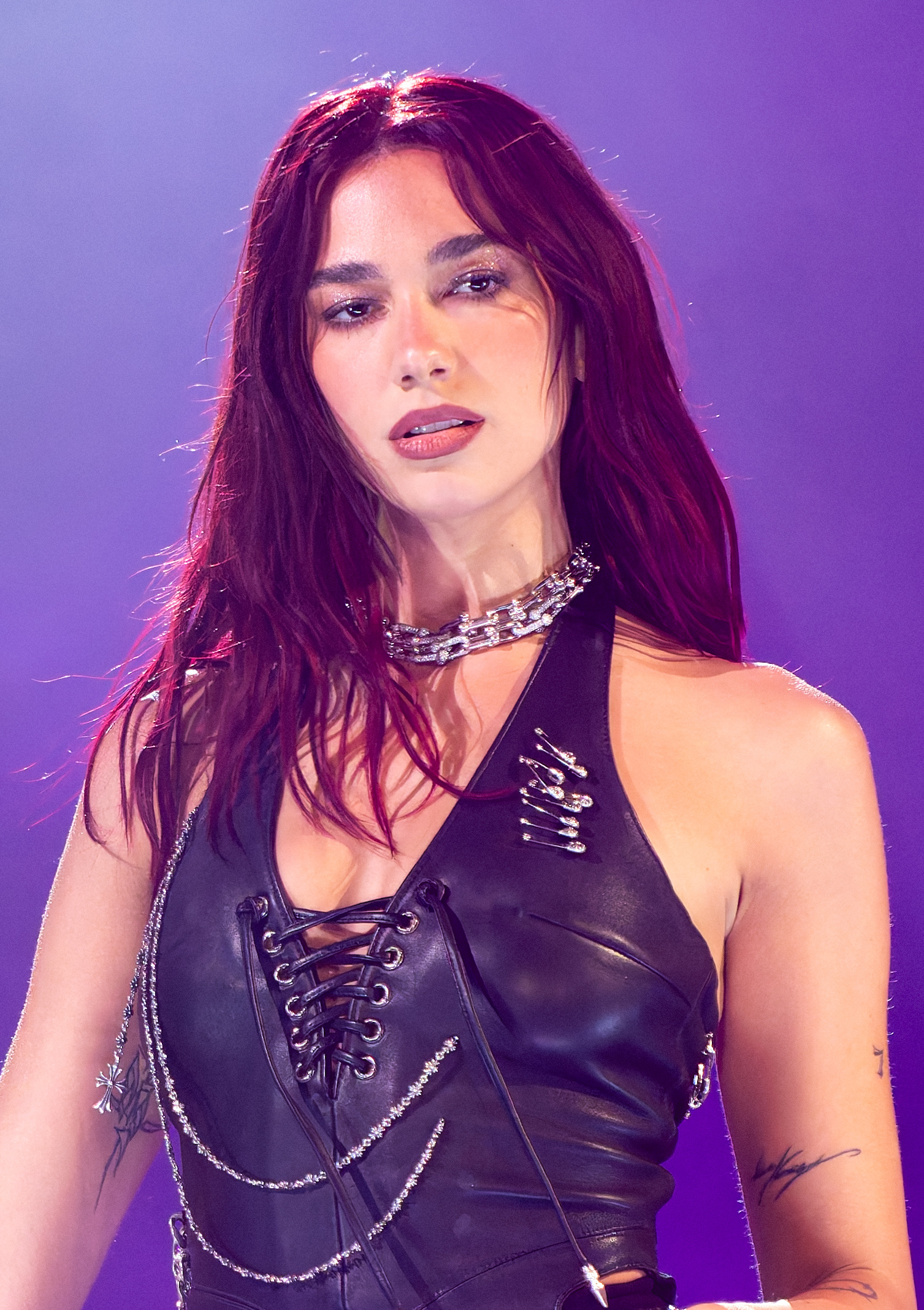
Dua Lipa

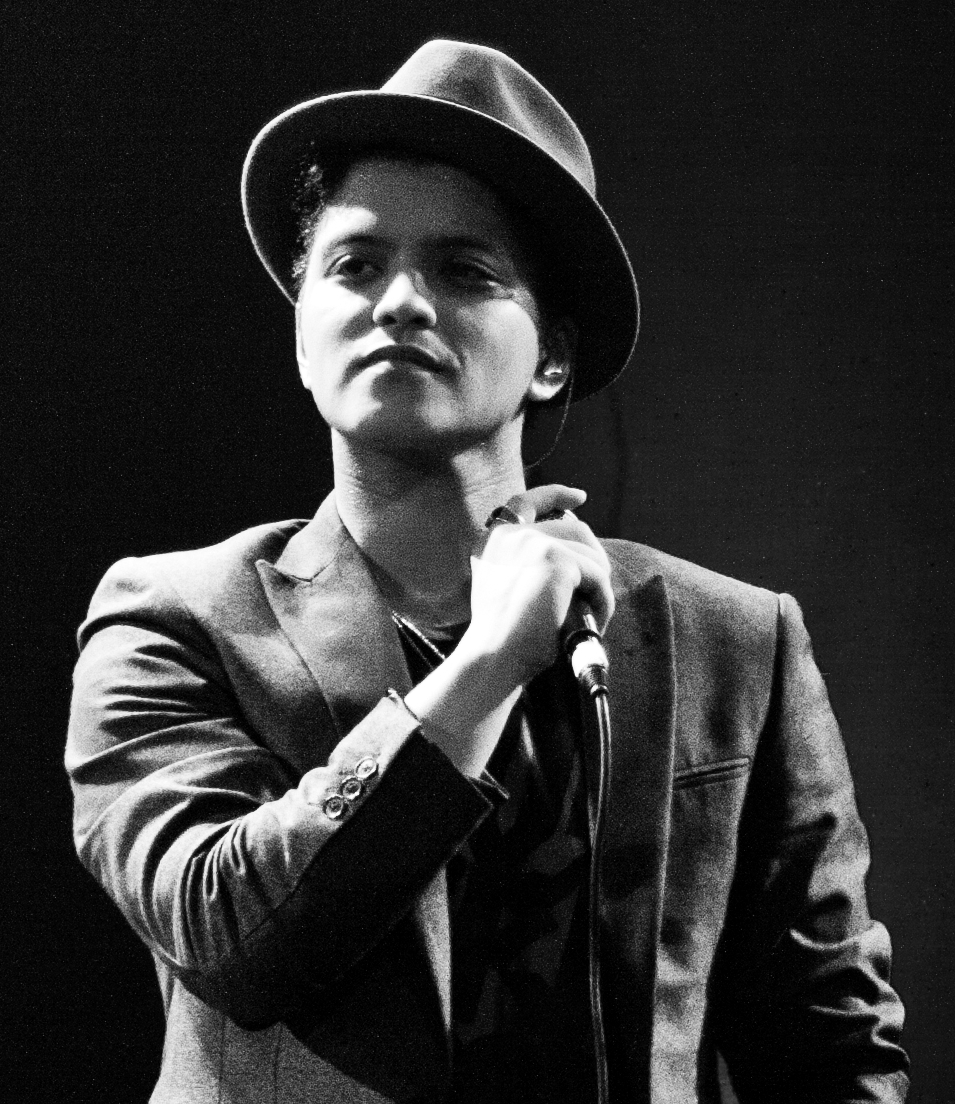
Bruno Mars

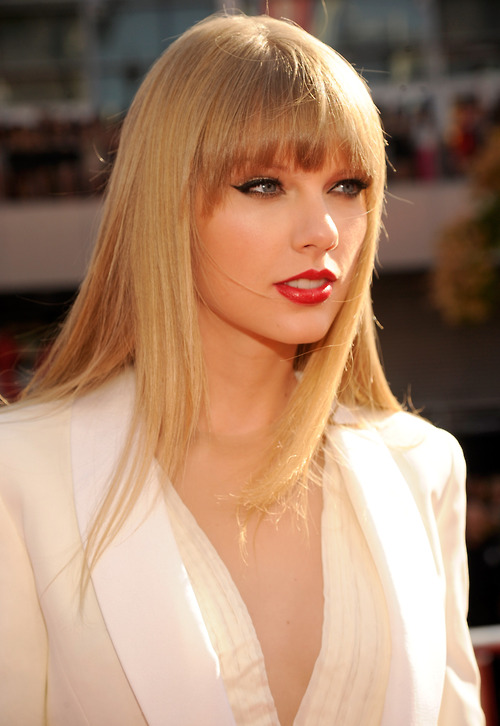
Taylor Swift

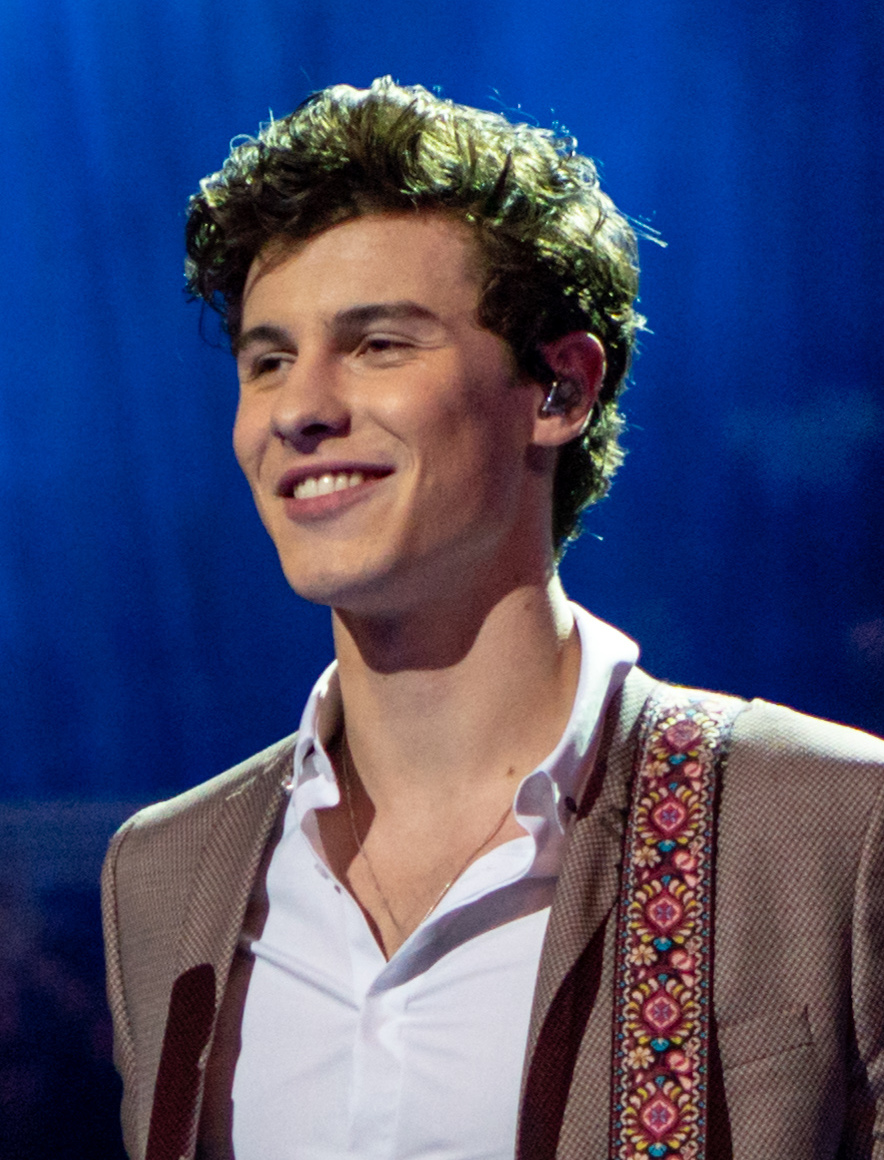
Shawn Mendes

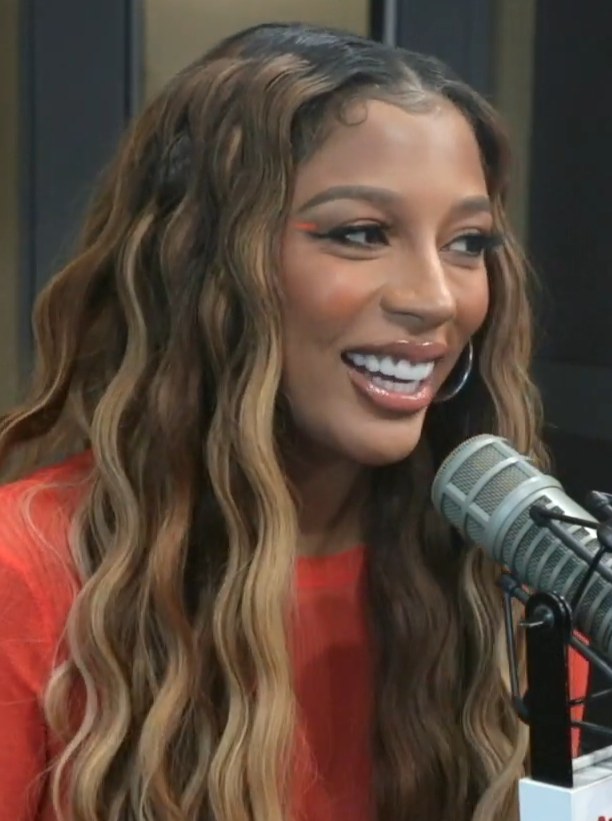
Victoria Monét

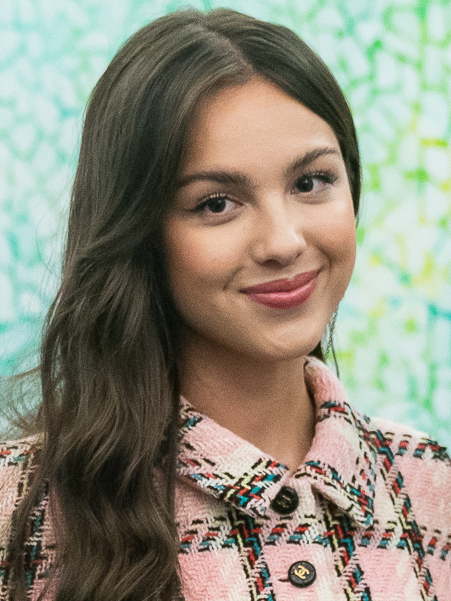
Olivia Rodrigo

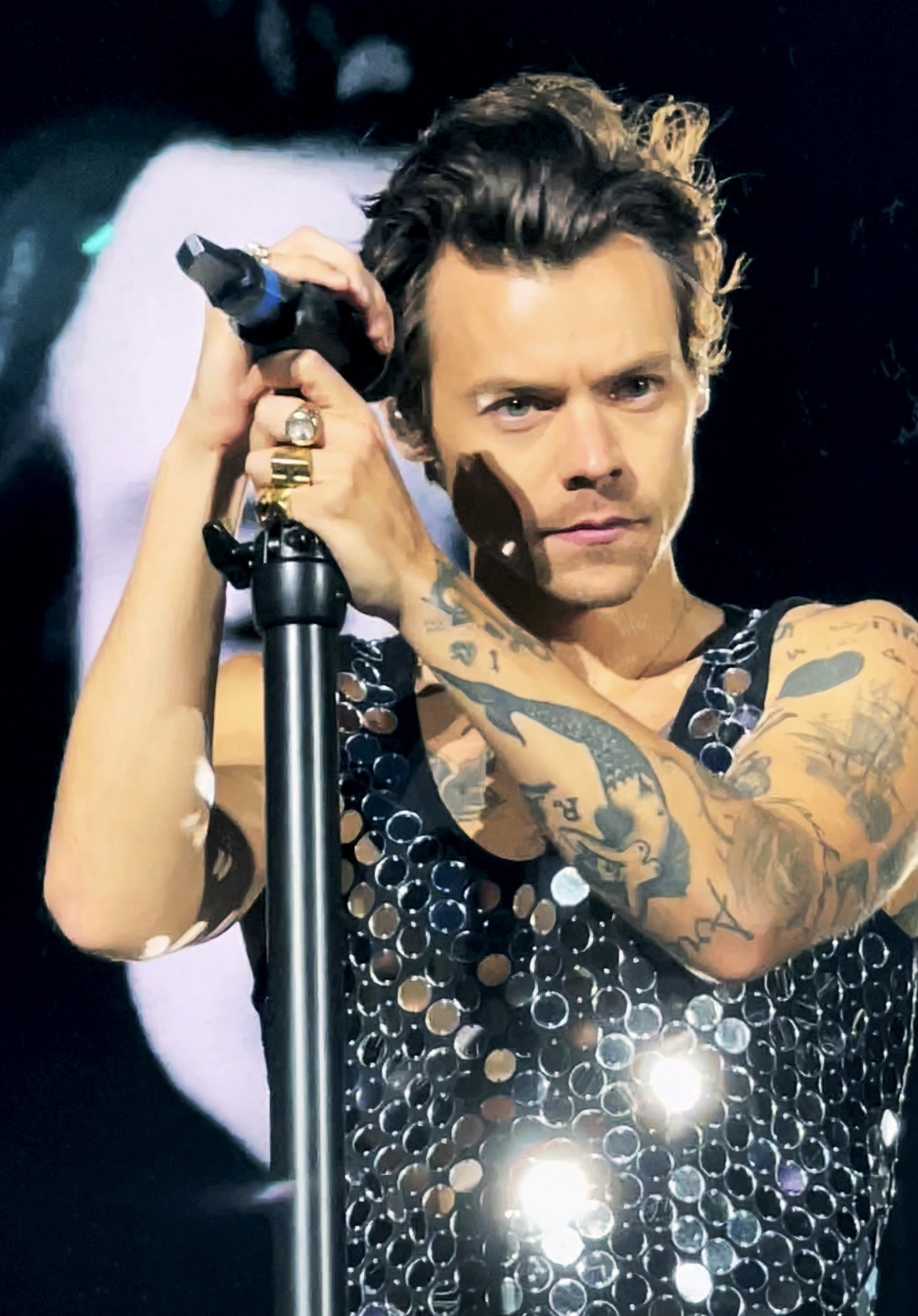
Harry Styles

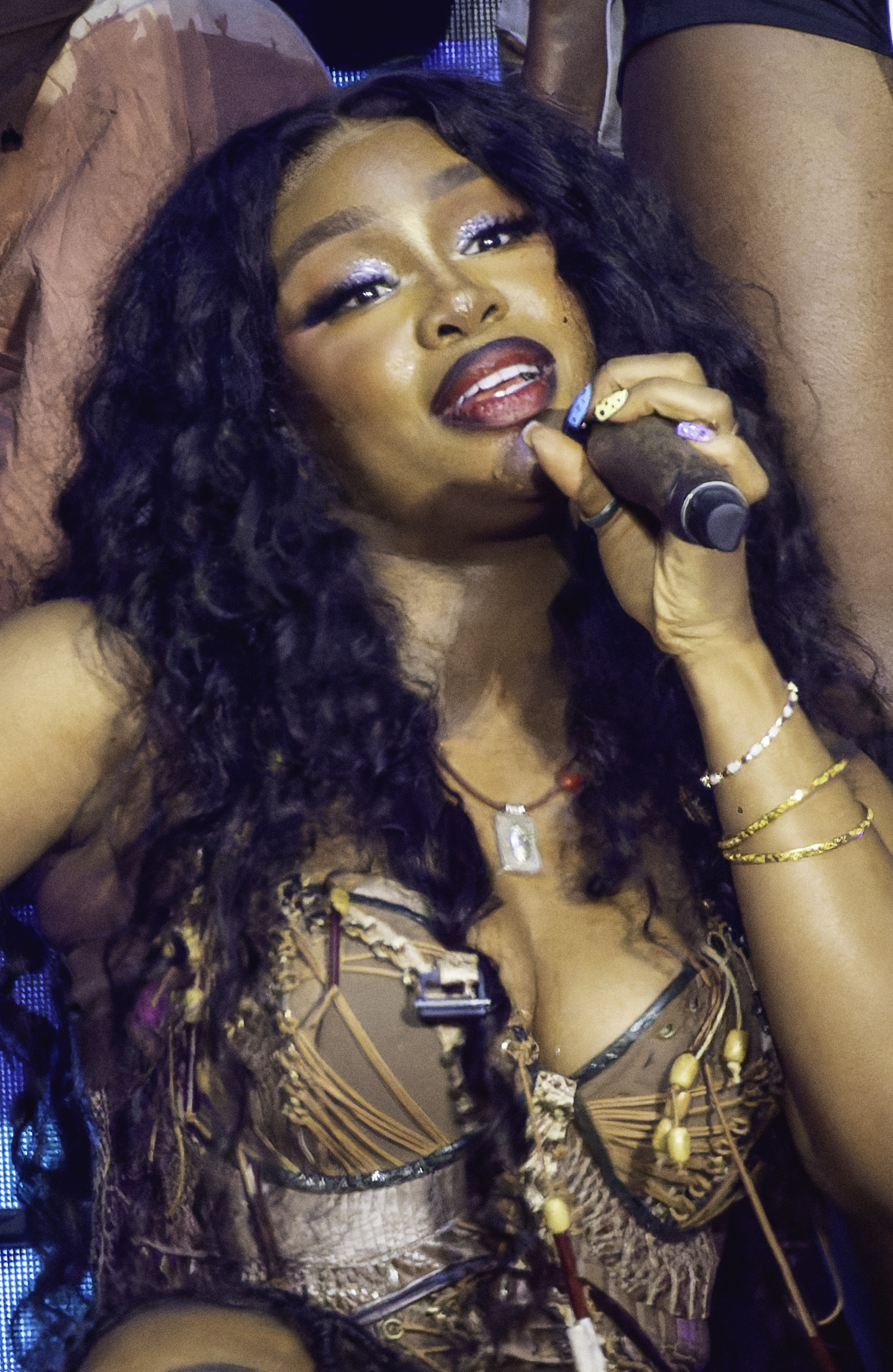
SZA

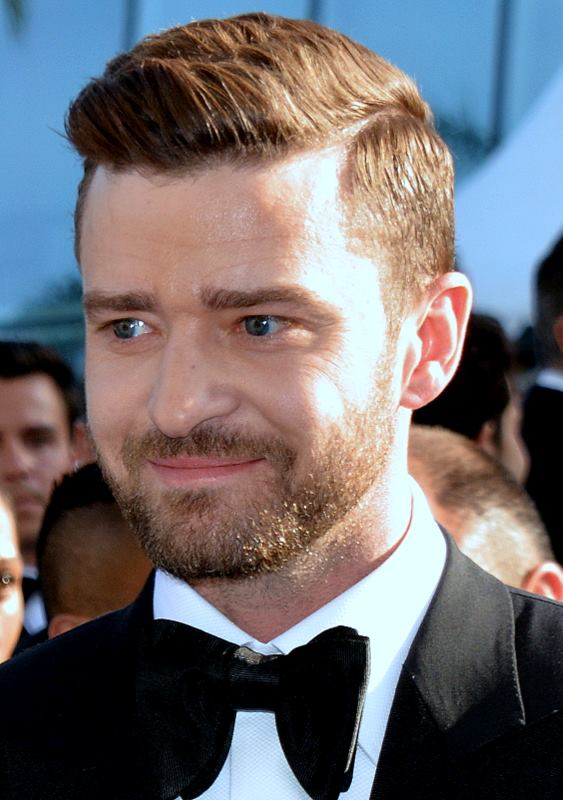
Justin Timberlake

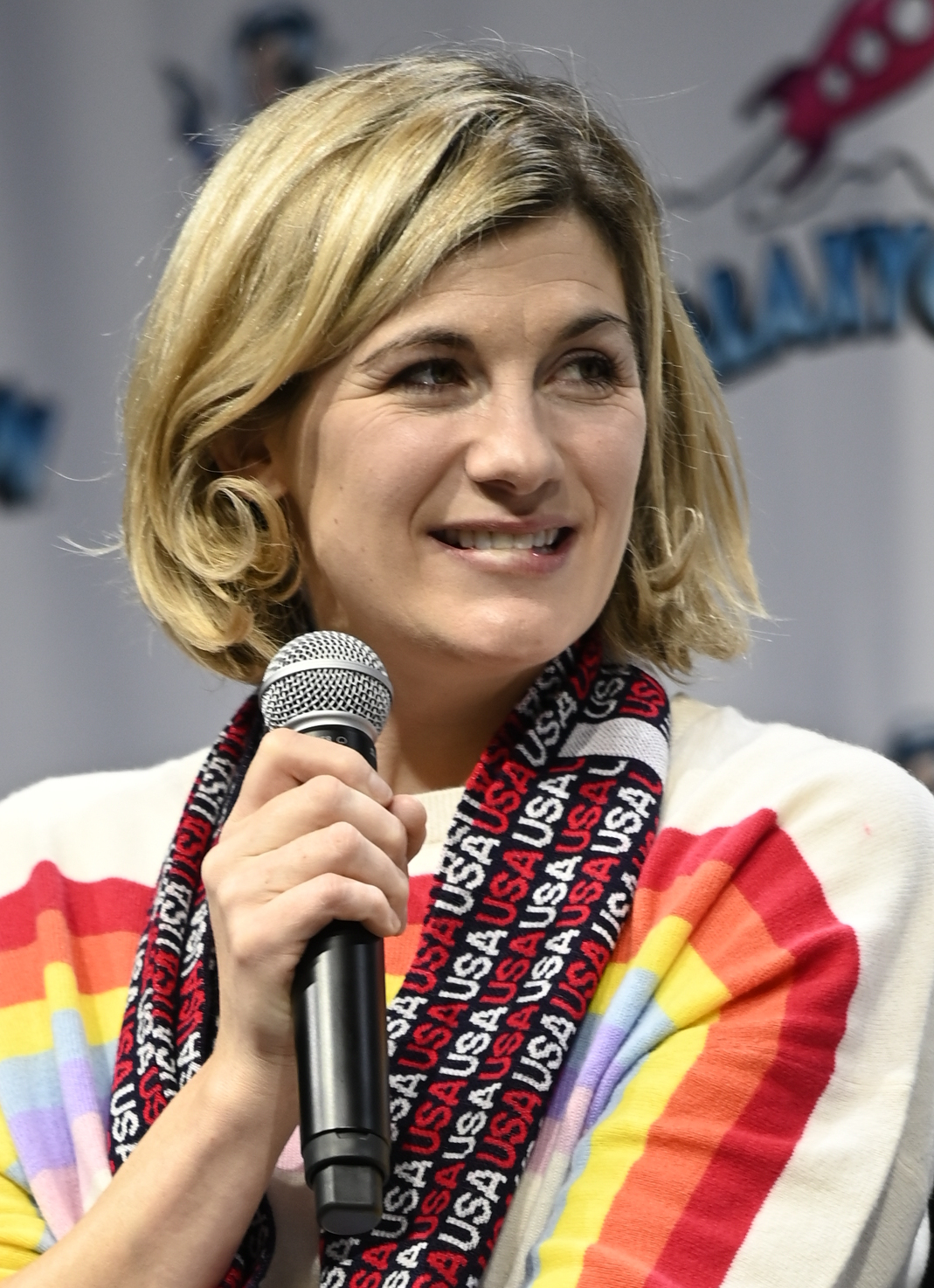
Jodie Whittaker
Coldplay have influenced artists across multiple generations, genres and fields of entertainment

American singer Halsey commented the band are among the artists who inspired her to develop a universe for each album: "Study the cover of any of their [records] and you can see a bunch of images, a colour, a font—something entirely representative of that era. I want to give my fans that experience". During an interview for CBS News, Jay-Z revealed that Martin convinced him to keep his Glastonbury set in 2008, after he considered withdrawing due to the backlash against a hip hop headliner. Beyoncé said she sent her set list and made sure the singer approved it prior to the 2011 edition of the event. Scottish composer John Lunn compared the soundtrack produced for ITV series Downton Abbey (2010) to Coldplay. South Korean music director Lee Ji-soo cited "Life in Technicolor II" among the references used to create the film score of In Our Prime (2022). English actress Jodie Whittaker mentioned that her costume design for the Thirteenth Doctor was partially influenced by the group's album covers. Filipino actor John Prats declared that watching their shows led him to pursue concert direction. Other entertainers who named them as an inspiration, favourite artist or drew comparisons in media encompass:

- 5 Seconds of Summer
- Alok
- American Authors
- Baby Queen
- James Bay
- Andrew Belle
- Jon Bellion
- Bleech 9:3
- BTS
- Burna Boy
- Mattias Bylund
- Lewis Capaldi
- Manuel Carrasco
- The Chainsmokers
- Rachel Chinouriri
- Jon M. Chu
- Peter Cincotti
- Jacob Collier
- Miley Cyrus
- Diljit Dosanjh
- Billie Eilish
- Elyanna
- Finneas
- Fools Garden
- The Fray
- Adarsh Gourav
- The Graduate
- David Guetta
- Lewis Hamilton
- H.E.R.
- Faith Hill
- Ice Spice
- Imagine Dragons
- J Balvin
- Jonas Brothers
- The Killers
- LANY
- Lauv
- Avril Lavigne
- Leona Lewis
- Lil Yachty
- Dua Lipa
- London Grammar
- Michael Marcagi
- Bruno Mars
- John Mayer
- Tim McGraw
- Shawn Mendes
- Kylie Minogue
- Victoria Monét
- Morat
- Takahiro Moriuchi
- Maren Morris
- Mumford & Sons
- The National
- Ne-Yo
- Wes Nelson
- Nidji
- Frank Ocean
- One Direction
- OneRepublic
- Paramore
- María Parrado
- P!nk
- Pinguini Tattici Nucleari
- Porridge Radio
- Rammstein
- Anirudh Ravichander
- Raynes
- Bebe Rexha
- Olivia Rodrigo
- The Rose
- Sandy
- Travis Scott
- The Script
- Self Esteem
- Ed Sheeran
- Sheppard
- Sigrid
- Slow Pulp
- Snow Patrol
- Harry Styles
- Stromae
- Swedish House Mafia
- Ian Sweet
- Taylor Swift
- Switchfoot
- SZA
- Faizal Tahir
- Tinie Tempah
- Alfie Templeman
- Justin Timberlake
- Twenty One Pilots
- Alberto Urso
- Vagabon
- Victor Vernicos
- Hana Vu
- Mimi Webb
- Kanye West
- Wild Youth

== Public image ==
=== Criticism ===
Coldplay are considered polarising cultural icons. In a survey released by the Daily Mirror, ranking the most popular and unpopular musicians in the United Kingdom, they were among the 20 most-voted acts on both lists; the only other groups with this distinction were ABBA and U2. Consequence's Geoff Nelson theorised that the band have the "unique position of being loved and hated with passion" because listening to them has "always been a look in the mirror, hearing a familiar sound or seeing an aesthetic retreaded for mass consumption—producing, alternatively, allure and disgust". He then concluded they have the "power to throw trends back at us" by rendering them "meaningless", becoming the "final word in cultural discourse" because "once Coldplay does it, it isn't a thing anymore". In 2000, Alan McGee referred to the group as "bedwetters music", to which Buckland answered: "We are trying to be who we are, [you know]. But that's about it. Pretending to be 'a bit mad' would just be sad".

Writing for The New York Times, Jon Pareles called them "the most insufferable band of the decade" and affirmed X&Y (2005) is "faultless to a fault, with instrumental tracks purged of any glimmer of human frailty". Similarly, The Independent's Andy Gill stated Coldplay "have conquered the charts with the sonic equivalent of wilted spinach" and "poisoned an entire generation of British rock music" as a result. They were also accused of trying to maintain a formula, while Amanda Petrusich from The New Yorker claimed their lyrics are corny and cliché. In 2016, Ryan Bassil criticised Martin for his performance on stage in an editorial for Vice, saying he "is a man who seemingly cannot transition between one place and another without skipping" and "his unbridled positivity is everything British people find difficult to stomach". Moreover, the band were negatively referenced in films and television series like The 40-Year-Old Virgin (2005), Peep Show (2005), and Family Guy (2008).

=== Praise ===
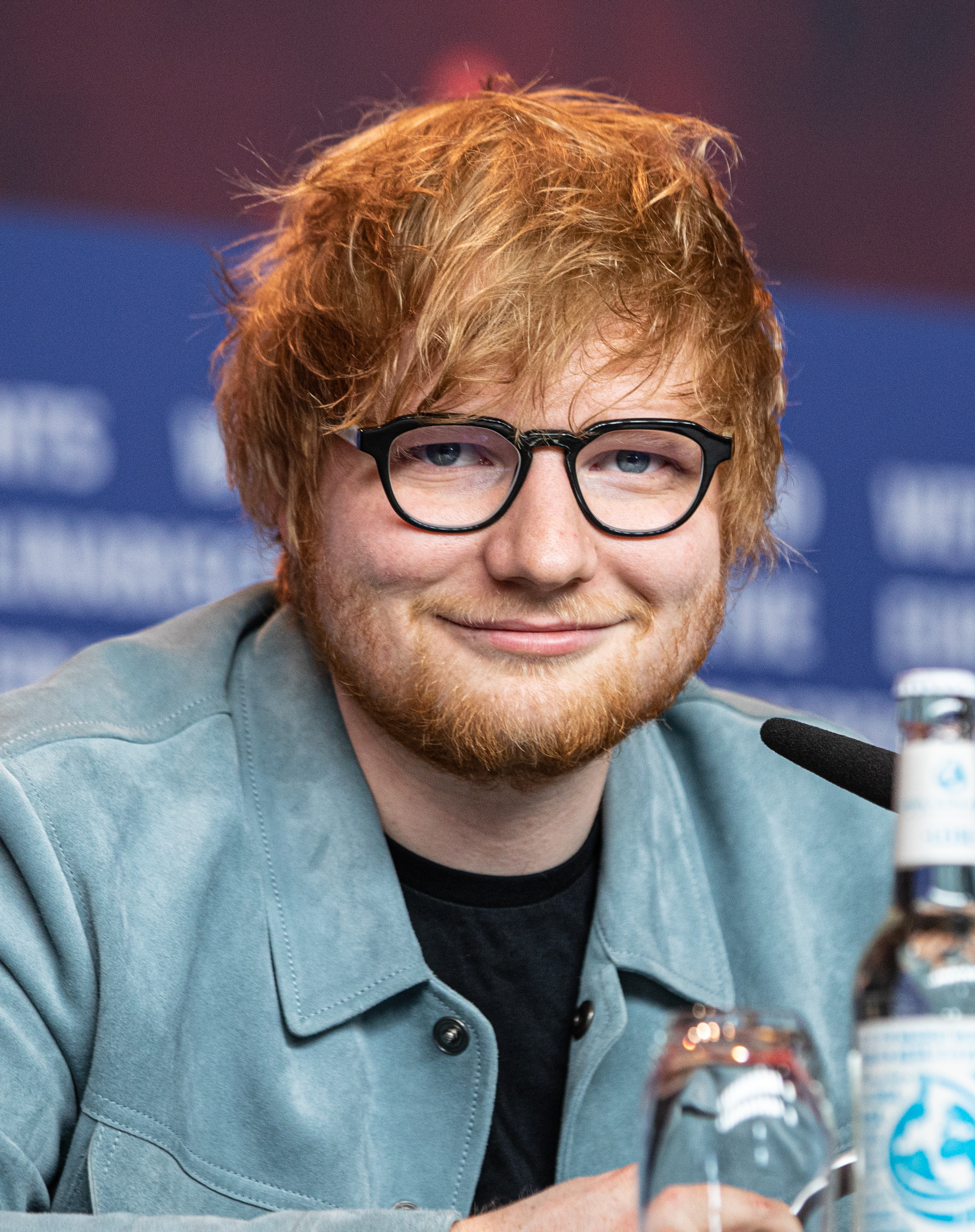
Ed Sheeran (pictured in 2018) has been cited as an example of a public figure Coldplay paved the way for

Michael Baumann told The Ringer that Coldplay were "earnest, nonthreatening and profoundly accessible" at "the worst time of the past 40 years to be those things", considering how they rose to fame in a decade marked by hipsterism, rockism and the peak of pop punk. As a result, he argued the band deserved reevaluation. Writing a 10th anniversary piece for X&Y (2005) on Idolator, Carl Williott opined that despite perfectionism being seen as corny, it can later earn prestige because the production values, songcraft and talent stood the test of time. Philip Cosores of Uproxx noted their earnestness has become endearing, as they "let the music world come to them" without compromising their brand or identity.

Several music critics lauded Coldplay for exploring different genres, in spite of not breaking from their conventions. Ben Beaumont-Thomas from The Guardian believed that "from genre-spanning albums to collaborating with Brian Eno and Beyoncé, the band are far more radical than people give them credit for", concluding they have challenged norms imposed on musical groups in their own way.

Jeremy Gordon wrote in The New York Times that they might have a career path similar to Phil Collins, with their original image disappearing while the songs endure. Discussing opinions about Martin as a celebrity for El País, Lanre Bakare said that he is a new type of pop star who connects on an emotional level, which benefited Lewis Capaldi, Ed Sheeran and other musicians of similar profile. Author Steven Hyden emphasised that Coldplay would not instigate so much debate if they were culturally meaningless and conceded that "being cool and popular tends to put an expiration date on your career", while "being uncool and popular makes you immortal".

In 2022, The Times columnist Mark Beaumont observed that the Music of the Spheres World Tour brought a shift in attitude towards the band, as they regained respect and credibility through showmanship. David Pfeifer from Süddeutsche Zeitung likewise mentioned that Coldplay have "inscribed themselves in the canon of pop music" with their concerts and demonstrated mastery in such craft by ensuring it remained dynamic. Billboard's Katie Atkinson stated that the group's performances "sustained their fan base and the excitement around them". Talking to the same magazine, Kyle Denis commented they became a legacy act who can still engage fans to buy new material. Following the announcement of their record fifth headline set at Glastonbury, Beaumont wrote on The Independent that Coldplay's work had not changed, it just became acceptable to recognise it was excellent all along. Publications including Esquire Greece, La Repubblica, and Mint have discussed how their intergenerational appeal is evident in Generation Z fans.

== Touring ==
=== Inclusivity ===
Felipe Branco Cruz from Veja commented that while groups like Pink Floyd and Queen have pioneered stadium performances and U2 offered spectacles which "transcended music", Coldplay reinvented the concept of arena rock by making fans an integral part of the show instead of mere spectators, being among the few contemporary bands to carry on such a legacy. In a review for CNN Portugal, Wilson Ledo affirmed that Martin interacts with the public in a welcoming and involving manner. The band have covered local songs and invited national guests to play with them as well. In 2011, they became the first musicians to incorporate LED wristbands to live performances. Jason Regler made the initial version of the product, but it was later replaced by PixMob models. Coldplay's connection with attendees has been partially attributed to the item and they are widely credited with popularising its use. Artists who followed the trend include Bad Bunny, Lady Gaga, and Shakira.

Additionally, the group received praise for their efforts in accessibility, working with KultureCity to provide sign language interpreters, SubPac vests, sensory refuge stations and touch tours to deaf, hard-of-hearing or visually impaired fans. They also established the Infinity Tickets program, selling $20 admissions to concert goers who cannot afford the regular prices. In September 2023, their Vancouver shows marked the first time in history that representatives of the Musqueam, Squamish and Tsleil-Waututh First Nations carried out a land acknowledgement at BC Place. Months later, The West Australian's Emma Garlett lauded them for having merchandise with Aboriginal designs and inviting Richard Walley to perform the same ritual during the Optus Stadium dates in Perth. Coldplay have been likewise acclaimed for their gender equality, hiring female professionals across the music industry through programmes and apprenticeships. As of 2024, their touring crew includes more than 40 women in areas from carpentry to personal security.

=== Sustainability ===
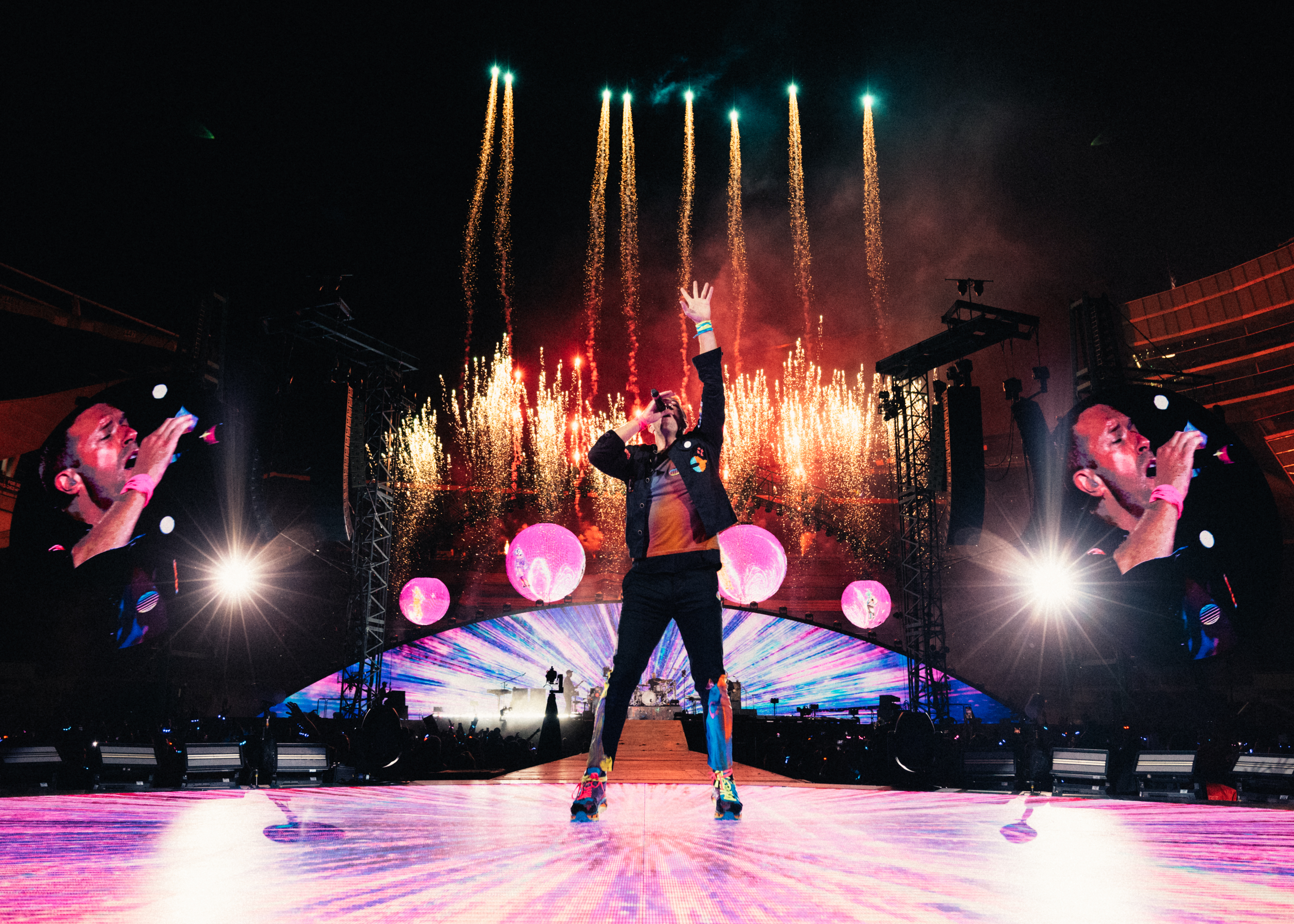
Coldplay's Music of the Spheres World Tour (pictured in 2022) reshaped green practices for live performances and brought more attention to the topic

Coldplay are considered pioneers for sustainability in live entertainment. Le Soir's Didier Zacharie said that the ecological plans proposed by the band were unprecedented in stadium tour scale. In 2022, sustainability director Lucy August-Perna claimed they assisted with the framework Live Nation had been developing over the past five years and mentioned that the company is working with them to adopt their best methods, making sustainable touring options more accessible. Publications subsequently noticed the band impacted concerts from Billie Eilish and Shawn Mendes, while the Kappa FuturFestival took similar green measures.

Furthermore, Coldplay's work with John Wiseman from Worldwide Sales and Frederic Opsomer from PRG Projects resulted in the creation of completely new LED stage products. Opsomer also defended that the custom technology made for the Music of the Spheres World Tour (2022–2025) is a standard for the future, thanking the band for the initiative. They have reduced carbon footprint by 59% in comparison to their previous tour, leading Time to put them among the most influential climate action leaders on the planet. In January 2024, it was informed Coldplay would co-fund a study proposing solutions for the entire live music industry. Research carried out by OVO Energy later noted that 52% of people in the United Kingdom became more aware of environmental issues in light of the group's actions.

== Industry ==
=== Economic influence ===
The anticipation and release of Coldplay albums have impacted the music industry's economy several times. A Rush of Blood to the Head amounted to 3% of the record sales at EMI in 2002. Conversely, postponing X&Y (2005) resulted in a 13% fall in annual profits for the company, which saw a considerable drop in share prices. Revenue only improved once the album was made available in stores. In 2008, Viva la Vida or Death and All His Friends helped reduce the declining record sales of the United States. Coldplay have fostered discussions on the viability of music streaming services as well, delaying access to Mylo Xyloto (2011), Ghost Stories (2014), and A Head Full of Dreams (2015) on platforms such as Spotify to question how artists are compensated for their work. The band were said to head the debate alongside Taylor Swift. Streaming earnings in the United Kingdom grew by £83 million after A Head Full of Dreams became available for consumption. Music of the Spheres (2021) improved CD sales in the country, while its tour boosted local economies worldwide. Reports cited the album as a major seller at Warner Music Group. In 2024, Coldplay helped optimise the British streaming market by 11% with Moon Music, while total spending hit a record £2.4 billion. They were also credited with driving demand for sustainable vinyls, broadening their adoption.

=== British export ===
According to James Moore from The Independent, Coldplay are one of the United Kingdom's greatest export earners and cultural assets. The British Phonographic Industry (BPI) has stated in multiple annual briefings that their worldwide success fuelled the external accounts of the region. Music critics suggest the band achieved global appeal by having a sonically diverse work and avoiding British rock tropes. (Note: Attributed to Firstpost, El País, and the Recording Academy.) X&Y (2005), Viva la Vida or Death and All His Friends (2008), Mylo Xyloto (2011), and Ghost Stories (2014) reached number one in more than 30 countries each. The first two were the best-sellers of their years, while the third broke the world record for most weekly digital sales. In 2013, Forbes ranked Coldplay as the world's most powerful British celebrities. A Head Full of Dreams (2015) later topped the iTunes charts in over 100 markets. The band also hold numerous touring records. Preply cited them as the leading act for English students in Brazil.

Moreover, they were particularly praised for "cracking" the American music industry, given the United States was "a notoriously difficult place for young British rock bands to make any commercial noise" at the time. As a result, Coldplay have been credited with helping to reestablish common cultural ground between the country and the United Kingdom. NME's Emily Barker observed that instead of having an exponential rise, their fan base was garnered slowly in the region. In June 2008, "Viva la Vida" became the first song by a British artist to rule the UK Singles Chart and Billboard Hot 100 rankings simultaneously since "Maggie May" (1971) by Rod Stewart. The latter publication listed Coldplay as the most successful Britons of the 2000s decade on their charts and the sixth-most-successful of the 2010s. Other milestones include being the first act to sell a million digital albums stateside, the first group from the United Kingdom to debut atop the Hot 100, and the British musicians with the most Billboard 200 leaders in the 21st century.

=== Marketing strategies ===
Coldplay are considered a "prime example of savvy global marketing". Chris from Obscure Sound praised the band for having numerous "forward-thinking strategies and creative promotions", further adding their use of the internet as a device for advertisement was revolutionary in the early 21st century. Similarly, the group were described as pioneers of social media management, since they were the first musicians to employ the scheduling function offered by Facebook and shared their routines during world tours on Snapchat, thus capitalising on the application's early success. As of 2026, they are the most followed rock band in the world on both Twitter and Instagram. Exame's Alexandre Loures and Flávio Castro claimed that making an analogy between public and customer, the Coldplay brand delivers and enviable business model. Additionally, the writers hailed the band as experts in establishing emotional connections, involving fans to the point of making them feel part of their universe.

When Chris Martin sings, in the open air, taking as much rain as the public, wind in the face, and scratches choruses in Portuguese, or the language of the country being toured, he immediately establishes an unparalleled syntony. Pure marketing? It doesn't matter. The fact is that the band are innovative, which we all should be.

— Exame, 2022

During A Rush of Blood to the Head (2002) and X&Y (2005) eras, they sent quarterly e-zines to mailing list subscribers. Their website also had features such as The Oracle and Roadie #42; the former answered band-related questions, while the latter wrote articles giving an inside view of Coldplay working on studio and touring the world. Furthermore, the group hired an administrator known as Anchorman, responsible for updating live blogs and running their social media while it is not being used. In 2014, they held a global scavenger hunt for handwritten lyrics from Ghost Stories, which were hidden in libraries and gave the fans a chance to attend their Royal Albert Hall performances.

Homemade footage was later requested to promote A Head Full of Dreams (2015), as submissions were used for the music video of "Amazing Day". Earlier that year, the band had also launched Coldplay Timeline, an interactive website to share stories, access multimedia content and explore their list of shows. In 2019, they announced Everyday Life by sending fans typewritten letters and revealed the album track list through the classified advertisements of newspapers all over the world. Two years later, Music of the Spheres (2021) was teased using a fictional broadcast station named Alien Radio FM. Promotion for Moon Music (2024) included immersive listening events in places like San Juan's Valle de la Luna, along with partnerships on TikTok, Roblox, and FC Barcelona.

== Cultural depictions ==
=== Covers and mentions ===
Numerous musicians around the world have recorded their own renditions of Coldplay songs. According to the BBC, they are the most covered group of all time at the Live Lounge, a segment from Radio 1 where acts usually perform a track from another artist. Magazines such as Billboard, Bustle, and Stereogum have published listicles evaluating the best new versions of their work. Some of them were reimagined in different languages and genres. Artists often name-check or reference the band in original pieces, including 50 Cent, Calle 13, Lupe Fiasco, Jason Derulo, Lil Wayne, Thomas Rhett, Demi Lovato, Lauv, Stormzy, and Jhené Aiko. Travis Scott has done so multiple times, with the earliest known case being "Way Back" in September 2016. Lizzo dedicated the twelfth track of her album Special to them six years later. While not a remake, Tegan and Sara's "Yellow" echoed the Coldplay song through its music video, filmed in July 2022 at Vancouver's Locarno Beach. In October 2023, Rachel Chinouriri said that the aesthetic for "The Hills" alluded to "The Scientist". Nijmegen, a city in the Dutch province of Gelderland, features a street named after the group.

=== Tribute projects ===
Coldplace (pictured in 2018) are the oldest known Coldplay tribute act

Coldplay have been the subject of various tribute projects around the world. Vitamin String Quartet released five albums commemorating the band through classical music. Pickin' On (2005) and Rockabye Baby! (2006) also honored their work. Two years later, Mick and Terry Urban paid homage to Martin and Jay-Z with the Viva la Hova mixtape. Gavin Mikhail conceptualised the extended plays Paradise (2011) and Every Teardrop Is a Waterfall (2012). Ensuing odes include the Royal Philharmonic Orchestra's Symphonic Coldplay album, unveiled in 2013. Orquestra Petrobras Sinfônica reused its title for a 2022 set.

Niels Geusebroek performed a salute at Lelystad's Agora Theater in the following year. Ensembles from Milwaukee and Manila organised exclusive concerts as well. Coldplay-themed events have taken place at venues such as the Museum of Science, Cleveland Museum of Natural History, Maynard F. Jordan Observatory, Planetarium of Bogotá, and Planetario Chile. Additionally, the group have spawned a wide range of tribute acts over the years, with examples including Coldplace (f. 2003), Coldplayers (f. 2007), Goldplay (f. 2010), Coldplayed (f. 2012), Ultimate Coldplay (f. 2017), and the Coldplay Experience (f. 2022).

== See also ==
- List of people associated with University College London
- List of British Grammy winners and nominees
- List of best-selling music artists
- List of highest-grossing live music artists
- List of artists who reached number one on the UK Singles Chart
