= David Baron (composer) =

American composer

- Born: Boiceville, New York
- Citizenship: American
- Education: BA degree in music from Oberlin Conservatory of Music
- Occupations: Composer; Producer; Arranger; Recording engineer and keyboardist
- Known for: Recording 'Hotel Song' by Diana DeMuth; Record of Hallucinogenics by Matt Maeson; Producing Scared to Start

David Baron is an American record producer, film composer and sound engineer. He is known for his contribution to the chart-topping single Hallucinogenics by Matt Maeson and for producing Scared to Start by Michael Marcagi.

In 2008, Baron founded Sun Mountain Studios in Boiceville, New York, a state-of-the-art recording facility featuring a collection of vintage analog synthesizers and recording equipment.

== Early life and education ==
David Baron was born in Boiceville, New York. Baron pursued higher education at the Oberlin Conservatory of Music in Oberlin, Ohio, earning a Bachelor of Arts degree in 1990.

Baron was raised in a musical environment, influenced by his father, Aaron Baron, a location recording engineer known for his work on albums such as The Allman Brothers Band at Fillmore East and B.B. King's Live in Cook County Jail. Aaron Baron was the founder of Location Recorders, a mobile recording company that captured live performances for various artists. The business and its mobile recording truck were later acquired by Albert Grossman, manager of Bob Dylan and The Band, and the founder of Bearsville Studios in Woodstock, New York.

== Career ==
Baron began his professional career in 1991, co-managing Baron and Baron with his father. The company specialized in creating original music for television network branding and worked with networks such as E!, fX, VH1, PBS, ABC, CBS, and Showtime.

In 2001, Baron founded Edison Music and co-operated the Hotel Edison recording studio alongside Lenny Kravitz and Henry Hirsch until 2008, a time, that he developed expertise in analog modular synthesizers, including the ARP 2500, Moog Modular 3p, and Serge Modular System. After closing Edison Studios, Baron opened Sun Mountain Studios in Boiceville, New York, less than 10 miles from Woodstock.

Baron co-produced Meghan Trainor's hit single "All About That Bass" and provided orchestral and string arrangements for artists such as Lenny Kravitz, Shawn Mendes, and Bat for Lashes. He has also contributed as a keyboardist for Keith Urban and Jason Mraz. He has co-produced Simone Felice's album Strangers and worked with artists including like Shania Twain, Darren Kiely, Nolan Taylor, Lana Del Rey, Jade Bird, and Matt Maeson. Baron also produced and mixed Jeremiah Fraites’ Piano Piano and PIano PInao 2, both of which reached the top of Billboard's Classical Crossover chart in 2021.

== Notable works ==
=== Film and art ===
- Here. Is. Better- documentary on PTSD by Jack Youngelson. Baron did the documentary film score (2021).
- Keely and Du- Baron did the feature film score (all electronic). (2018).
- Gregory Colbert/Ashes and Snow – art and technological installation project. Follow up to Ashes and Snow. Multiple long-form films (score), 24-hour song cycle (songwriter and chief producer), and short VR films (2018).
- Lost Child – Premiered October 2017 at Heartland Film Festival as Tatterdemalion. Baron was a composer in the music department (2017).
- The Lumineers "Ballad of Cleopatra" – Baron created the underscore for the short film. (2017)
- "Francis" VR Film – Baron created the musical score for VR film for the World Bank/World Health Organization to raise awareness for mental health. Shown at the First World Humanitarian Summit in Turkey, the UN, World Bank conference, and Sundance Film Festival. (2017)
- High School Moms – Composer (2012).

=== Records ===
- Darren Kiely – "Weight". Producer (2025).
- The Lumineers – "Automatic''. Co-Producer (2025).
- Ginger Winn – "Stop-Motion". Producer (2024)
- Michael Marcagi – " Good Enough". Producer (2024).
- Michael Marcagi – "American Romance". Composer (2024)
- David Baron – "The ARP 2500". Producer (2023)
- The Lumineers – "Brightside". Producer, Mixer and Engineer(2021)
- Shania Twain "Christmas Song". Arranger, Engineer, Keyboards, Programming (2021).
- David Baron with Donna Lewis, Lettie, Fiona Glenn, Tony Levin, Craig Ross, Rubin Kodheli, Cindy Mizell, and more_ "Whisperers"(2020)
- David Baron ft Donna Lewis_"Bad Bad Love''. David Baron helped in the Synthesizers, Programming, Pipe Organ (2019).
- The Lumineers – III. Engineer. Baron's credits include: Mixer, Keyboards, Arranger(2019).
- Diana DeMuth – "Hotel". Baron was Producer, Engineer, Mixer, Keyboards, Programmer.
- Matt Maeson – "Hallucinogenics", "The Hearse". Baron was producer, engineer, arranger, and keyboardist. Atlantic Records. (2018)
- Michael Marcagi – "Scared to Start". Baron was producer.
- Noah Kahan – "Carlo's Song". Baron was producer, engineer, and did keyboards, programming, piano.
- Jade Bird – Jade Bird. Baron was producer, engineer, mixer, keyboards, piano, string arrangements.
- Josin "Evaporation New York Recordings" Producer, Engineer, Mixer.
- Molly Tuttle – When You're Ready. Noise, synthesizer.
- Bat for Lashes – The Bride 2016. Baron was responsible for synthesizers, string arrangements, and mixing. EMI Records. Nominated for the 2016 Mercury Prize Award.
- The Lumineers – Cleopatra. Baron played keyboards. Dualtone Records. #1 Billboard Record (2016)
- The Lumineers – "Nightshade" from Game of Thrones. Baron was Mixer.
- David Baron – Cycles. Here & Now Recordings, UK – debut solo record. Instrumental music featuring rare analog Modular synthesizers, string sections and grand pianos recorded in a concert hall, hyper-processed acoustic instruments, and advanced Kyma-based sound design.
- Jade Bird – Something American EP, "Lottery". Baron was producer, engineer, mixer (except for "Lottery"), arranger, musician (2017–2018).
- Simone Felice – The Projector. Baron was responsible for keyboards, engineering, arranger, additional production, mixing (2018)
- Lenny Kravitz – Raise Vibration. Baron was responsible for piano, keyboards, synthesizers, orchestral arrangements, orchestral production BMG. (2018)
- Vance Joy – Nation of Two, "Little Boy". Baron was responsible for keyboards, bass, arrangement, and recording. (2018).
- Shawn Mendes, "Perfectly Wrong". Baron was responsible for string arrangement, conductor, Island Records (2018)
- Shawn Mendes – "Bad Reputation". Baron was responsible for string arrangement, conductor, Island Records.
- Simi Stone – Simi Stone. Baron was producer, co-writer, and mixer(2017).
- Nick Fradiani – "Howl at the Moon". Baron played keyboards. Big Machine Records
- Melanie De Biasio – "Blackened Cities", 2016. Baron was responsible for mix engineering and mastering. PIAS Recordings.
- Meghan Trainor, Title. EP and Record. Baron was a musician, arranger and conductor. Epic Records. Multi-platinum, Number One Record, Grammy Song of the Year Nominee (2015).
- Simone Felice – Strangers. Producer and co-writer. (2014)
- Burnell Pines – Burnell Pines. Baron was producer, co-writer, and arranger.
- Lenny Kravitz – Lenny, Black and White America, Strut. Baron appears as string arranger, synthesist, and keyboardist.
- Peter Murphy – Ninth. Baron was Producer, Composer, Cowriter and Musician. Nettwerk.
- Michael Jackson – "Another Day". Baron appears on synths and programming.
- Lettie – "Age of Solo", "Everyman", and "Good Weather, Bad Fortune". Producer and co-writer.

== Commercials and network branding ==
From 2000 to 2008, Baron played a role in TV Land’s branding, creating scores and main titles for the network. In addition to his work with TV Land, he contributed to branding and advertising campaigns for major companies such as Verizon, JC Penney, H&R Block, and Pepsi, including composing the iconic Verizon logo sound. His other projects included the OWN Network launch, Old Navy’s “Drawstring” jingle, Target’s “Love & Efficiency” song, and JCPenney’s “It’s All Inside” campaign. He also co-composed the PBS Kids theme with David Wilson.
