= Brightside (The Lumineers song) =

2021 single by The Lumineers

Single by The Lumineers

from the album Brightside
- Released: September 20, 2021
- Length: 3:49
- Label: Decca; Dualtone
- Songwriters: Jeremiah Fraites; Wesley Schultz
- Producers: Simone Felice; David Baron; Brian Hubblen; Rick Mullen; Derek Brown

The Lumineers singles chronology
| "Salt and the Sea" (2020) | "Brightside" (2021) | "Big Shot" (2021) |

Music video
- "Brightside" on YouTube

"Brightside" (stylized in all uppercase) is a song by American folk rock band The Lumineers. It was released on September 20, 2021, as the lead single from the band's fourth studio album of the same name. The song was written by Jeremiah Fraites and Wesley Schultz, and produced by Simone Felice, David Baron, Brian Hubblen, Rick Mullen and Derek Brown.

== Content ==
The band's singer-guitarist Wesley Schultz stated in a press release: "The song 'Brightside' was recorded in a single day. It's like a 15-year-old's fever dream, an American love story in all its glory and heartbreak. The last couple left, on the run from something and all alone."

== Music video ==
An accompanying video was released on September 29, 2021, and directed by Kyle Thrash. It was filmed at an American Legion Hall. At the beginning of the video, a variety of people answer the question: "What does love mean to you?" And showcases "the love of couples of all ages, races, and genders dance the waltz around the band as they perform the song." Schultz commented the video: "The 'Brightside' music video is like a documentary of the American love story. It features all real people - none of the people that appear in it are actors".

== Live performance ==
On September 20, 2021, the band performed the song on Jimmy Kimmel Live!.

== Credits and personnel ==
Credits adapted from AllMusic.

- Luke Armentrout – assistant mastering engineer
- David Baron – bass, engineer, mixing, organ, piano, producer, synthesizer
- Derek Brown – producer, sound supervision
- Taylor Chadwick – assistant mastering engineer
- Andrew Darby – assistant mastering engineer
- James Felice – vocals (background)
- Simone Felice – producer, recording arranger, tambourine, vocals (background)
- Jeremiah Fraites – bass (electric), composer, drums, piano, recording arranger
- Sara Full – production coordination
- Bobbi Giel – assistant mastering engineer
- Renee Hikari – stage assistant
- Anthony Hook – editing assistant
- Brian Hubblen – producer, sound supervision
- Byron Isaacs – vocals (background)
- The Lumineers – primary artist
- Andrew Mendelson – mastering engineer
- Rick Mullen – Producer, Sound Supervision
- Wesley Schultz – composer, guitar (electric), recording arranger, vocals, vocals (background)

== Charts ==
=== Weekly charts ===
Chart performance for "Brightside"
| Chart (2021–2022) | Peak position |
|---|---|
| Canada Hot 100 (Billboard) | 64 |
| Canada Rock (Billboard) | 1 |
| US Bubbling Under Hot 100 (Billboard) | 24 |
| US Hot Rock & Alternative Songs (Billboard) | 13 |
| US Rock & Alternative Airplay (Billboard) | 2 |

=== Year-end charts ===
2022 year-end chart performance for "Brightside"
| Chart (2022) | Position |
|---|---|
| US Hot Rock & Alternative Songs (Billboard) | 77 |
| US Rock Airplay (Billboard) | 13 |

== Release history ==
Release history for "Brightside"
| Region | Date | Format | Label | Ref. |
|---|---|---|---|---|
| Various | September 20, 2021 | Digital download; streaming | Decca | |
| United States | September 28, 2021 | Alternative radio | Dualtone | |
