= Diana DeMuth =

American singer-songwriter

- Born: Concord, Massachusetts
- Occupation: singer-songwriter
- Years active: 2008-present
- Label: Thirty Tigers
- Website: https://www.dianademuth.com/

Diana DeMuth is an American singer-songwriter from Concord, Massachusetts.

== History ==
DeMuth began writing songs at the age of eleven, and released her first EP in 2008 at the age of fourteen. This was followed in 2011 with another self-published EP, Restless Mind. In 2013, DeMuth was a contestant on the singing competition show The X Factor USA. She decided to audition for the show on a whim during a layover while in Colorado. DeMuth made it to the round of 30 before exiting the competition. DeMuth released her first album, titled Albuquerque, in 2015, working with producer Alain Mallet. DeMuth released her second full-length album, The Doorway, in the summer of 2017. Looking to revitalize her career and having signed to Thirty Tigers in 2019, DeMuth released her first song in three years titled Hotel Song. DeMuth released a new song in January 2020 titled Rose of Nantucket. In April 2020, DeMuth released another new song titled Steady Rolling. In mid-2021, DeMuth released her third full-length album titled Misadventure. The album was produced by Simone Felice and David Baron.
