= Scared to Start =

Single by Michael Marcagi

from the EP American Romance
- Released: January 12, 2024
- Genre: Folk
- Length: 2:39
- Label: Warner
- Songwriters: Michael Marcagi; Andrew Yorio
- Producer: David Baron

Michael Marcagi singles chronology
"The Other Side" (2023)	"Scared to Start" (2024)	"Good Enough" (2024)

"Scared to Start" is a song by American singer Michael Marcagi, released as his second single on January 12, 2024, through Warner Records. It charted internationally, reaching the top 10 in both Ireland and the UK, and the top 20 in both Australia and New Zealand.

== Background and promotion ==
Michael Marcagi, a native of Cincinnati, Ohio, previously fronted the rock band the Heavy Hours. He previewed the song "Scared to Start" on TikTok in November 2023, after which it was used in over 70,000 videos on the platform.

== Commercial performance ==
The song reached the top 10 in Ireland and the UK, as well as the top 20 in Australia, Canada, and New Zealand. It also charted in Sweden at number 29, and peaked at number 54 on the US Billboard Hot 100 chart in the issue dated April 20, 2024.

== Charts ==
=== Weekly charts ===
Weekly chart performance for "Scared to Start"
Chart (2024)	Peak position
Australia (ARIA)	12
Austria (Ö3 Austria Top 40)	17
Belgium (Ultratop 50 Flanders)	33
Canada (Canadian Hot 100)	20
Germany (GfK)	43
Global 200 (Billboard)	35
Ireland (IRMA)	4
Netherlands (Dutch Top 40)	20
Netherlands (Single Top 100)	26
New Zealand (Recorded Music NZ)	13
Norway (VG-lista)	13
Sweden (Sverigetopplistan)	19
Switzerland (Schweizer Hitparade)	16
UK Singles (OCC)	9
US Billboard Hot 100	54
US Adult Pop Airplay (Billboard)	36
US Hot Rock & Alternative Songs (Billboard)	5
US Rock & Alternative Airplay (Billboard)	11

=== Year-end charts ===
Year-end chart performance for "Scared to Start"
Chart (2024)	Position
Australia (ARIA)	18
Belgium (Ultratop 50 Flanders)	71
Canada (Canadian Hot 100)	45
Global 200 (Billboard)	116
Netherlands (Single Top 100)	45
New Zealand (Recorded Music NZ)	24
Sweden (Sverigetopplistan)	35
Switzerland (Schweizer Hitparade)	76
UK Singles (OCC)	20
US Hot Rock & Alternative Songs (Billboard)	15
US Rock Airplay (Billboard)	32

== Certifications ==
Certifications for "Scared to Start"
Region	Certification	Certified units/sales
Australia (ARIA)	3× Platinum	210,000^{‡}
Belgium (BRMA)	Gold	20,000^{‡}
Canada (Music Canada)	5× Platinum	400,000^{‡}
Denmark (IFPI Danmark)	Gold	45,000^{‡}
Netherlands (NVPI)	Platinum	93,000^{‡}
New Zealand (RMNZ)	2× Platinum	60,000^{‡}
Switzerland (IFPI Switzerland)	Gold	15,000^{‡}
United Kingdom (BPI)	2× Platinum	1,200,000^{‡}
United States (RIAA)	2× Platinum	2,000,000^{‡}
^{‡} Sales+streaming figures based on certification alone.
