= SubPac (company) =

SUBPAC
- Industry: Tactile Audio System
- Founder: John Alexiou; Todd Chernecki
- Headquarters: Toronto, Canada
- Products: SUBPAC M1, SUBPAC S1, SUBPAC M2, SUBPAC S2, SUBPAC M2X
- Owner: StudioFeed
- Website: subpac.com

SUBPAC is a tactile audio system, designed and developed in Toronto, Ontario, Canada. The SUBPAC consists of a combination of tactile transducers, vibro-tactile membranes, electronics and textiles, designed to deliver a physical dimension of sound. SUBPAC is available in a wearable and seatback format. The device was intended to move music hardware technologies in this area past simple 'vibrating devices' to deliver a complex and nuanced experience, to create an accurate tactile representation of whatever audio input is used. Outside of music production and enjoyment, the SUBPAC has a wide range of applications such as gaming, virtual reality (VR) and film enjoyment.

== History ==
SUBPAC was founded by John Alexiou and Todd Chernecki and developed by members of the social venture StudioFeed. The SUBPAC was engineered by SUBPAC Head of R&D Sarosh Khwaja and electronics designer Andrew Kilpatrick.

The first model, the SUBPAC S1, was launched through a successful Kickstarter campaign in 2013, raising over $100,000. A wearable unit, the SUBPAC M1, then followed in October 2013. Early adopters and supporters of the SUBPAC included Kode 9, Adrian Sherwood, Hank Shocklee, Richie Hawtin, Gaudi, Flying Lotus, George Clinton, Gilles Peterson, Cevin Key, Mala, and Pinch. In June 2014, a special edition of the S1 was released in association with Richie Hawtin's latest Plastikman record EX. It is the first time a record has been released with a technology designed to deliver the full impact of the experience.

In June 2016, entertainer and music producer Timbaland and Google Android co-creator Andy Rubin had partnered with SUBPAC.

== Overview ==
The SUBPAC frequency response is 5 Hz–125 Hz with a steep roll-off. The SUBPAC can be used with any line in audio source, and in conjunction with any speaker set-up or headphones. It weighs 3.8 lbs. The SUBPAC transfers low frequencies to the user's body while still maintaining the original signal to the headphones – it does not separate the audio signal into lows vs. mid/highs as a traditional subwoofer does.

=== Collaborations ===
SUBPAC has participated in a wide range of collaborations since its inception. The first event with the SUBPAC M1 was held October 2013 at an interactive showcase in partnership with AUDiNT (Toby Heys and Steve Goodman) at Unsound Music Festival in Poland. It was also released as an album bundle on a limited run with the most recent Plastikman release. This is the first time a product that explores physical dimensions of sound has been released alongside an album. SUBPAC debuted its 'Silent Disco Solution' with Dada Life, at an Insomniac event, adding another layer of immersion to the traditional silent disco concept. SUBPAC was also introduced to a movie theatre environment at the LA Independent Theatre through a collaboration with Brainfeeder audio-visualist Strangeloop in a new audio-visual show and new-cinema series. In July 2014, SUBPAC was integrated into fashion designer Gareth Pugh and musician Matthew Stone's virtual reality project at Selfridges, as a demo for London Technology Week. SUBPAC has also partnered with the Muse Seek Project, in order to deliver the music experience (through vibrations) to members of the deaf community.

One of SUBPAC's most notable artist collaborations is with DJ and music producer Timbaland. The partnership between Timbaland and Alexiou began in June 2016. According to Alexiou, watching Timbaland on-stage was what inspired the product originally. Timbaland wore the SUBPAC for a performance at Pitbull's New Year's Eve Revolution in December 2015. He has stated, "SubPac is for anyone who wants a deeper connection with feeling", adding that it will change the way albums are made.

Kyrie Irving joined SUBPAC as a key investor in 2016 after the media took notice of him wearing it during a pre-game NBA Finals press conference.

In 2020, SUBPAC also announced a collaboration with Deadmau5, which led to the release of a limited edition, custom SUBPAC M2 model.

=== Virtual Reality & Gaming ===
In 2020, SUBPAC partnered with Beat Saber, a virtual reality rhythm game that requires players to slice blocks in accordance with musical beats. A limited edition Beat Saber SUBPAC M2 was released for players who use the wearable bass technology to enhance their in-game accuracy.

Prior to this collaboration, SUBPAC pioneered numerous other virtual reality events, such as the VRLA Silent Rave in 2016, the location-based VR experience Tree, and nature simulator In the Eyes of the Animal.

In 2019, SUBPAC announced a partnership with computer electronics company Razer, Inc. on their new HyperSense initiative. Using SUBPAC's sensory bass technology, they plan to release a line of haptic feedback powered gaming devices.

=== Cinema ===
SUBPAC's involvement with film-related projects began as early as 2015. At that time, they partnered with Universal Pictures to provide an immersive Jurassic Park virtual reality experience.

In 2016, SUBPAC was part of a similar debut for Suicide Squad at Comic-Con.

That same year, SUBPAC partnered with CJ CGV, the largest cinema operator in Korea. SUBPAC technology was integrated into theater seats at a CGV Cinema in downtown Seoul. Seventy-five theater seats were fitted with SUBPAC bass technology in the backrests, individual armrest controls for intensity settings, and headphones. It is the first large-scale commercial movie theater with a physical sound element.

In 2017, SUBPAC partnered with IMAX and Universal Pictures to provide a cinematic viewing of The Mummy in full-motion, zero-gravity VR chairs using their physical audio technology.

=== Automotive ===
In 2015, SUBPAC announced its first automotive initiative as part of the Peugeot ‘Fractal’ Concept Car. Music producer and art futurist Amon Tobin conceptualized a car with SUBPAC technology embedded in the seatbacks for a physical audio experience while driving. It involved equipping each seat with discrete knobs for custom adjustment of audio settings. The vehicle contained 11 Focal speakers and a majority 3D-printed interior.

Since then, SUBPAC has also partnered with Faurecia on their Cockpit of the Future initiative, which aims to provide more personalized driver and passenger experiences.

== Other Initiatives ==
=== Deaf & Hard-of-Hearing ===
SUBPAC works with artists and non-profit organizations in the Deaf and hard-of-hearing communities due to its ability to emanate sound as a physical experience. In 2016, SUBPAC supplied 24 students at the National School for the Deaf in Santo Domingo with their wearable devices. The students wore the SUBPACs in order to be able to experience whale sounds in the form of bass vibrations.

In 2017, SUBPACs were distributed to a music class at St. Mary's School for the Deaf.

== Reception ==
SUBPAC has won numerous awards for innovation. In 2016, it was named as one of the Most Innovative Companies by Fast Company. That same year, it was awarded Best-in-Show at the 7th Annual Auggie Awards.
