= Maynard F. Jordan Observatory =

Observatory in Maine, US

- Organization: University of Maine
- Location: Orono, Maine (USA)
- Coordinates: 44°53′56″N 68°40′3″W
- Established: 1901

Maynard F. Jordan Observatory is an astronomical observatory owned and operated by University of Maine. Its first telescope was installed at the university in 1901, and was upgraded during the creation of the Emera Astronomy Center in 2014. It is located in Orono, Maine, USA. It is the only public observatory in the state of Maine. Operated by the department of Physics and Astronomy, the eight-inch Alvan Clark telescope is housed under a roll-off roof, next to the more modern PlaneWave CDK20 in its own dome.

== See also ==
- List of observatories
