= Michael Marcagi =

American singer-songwriter

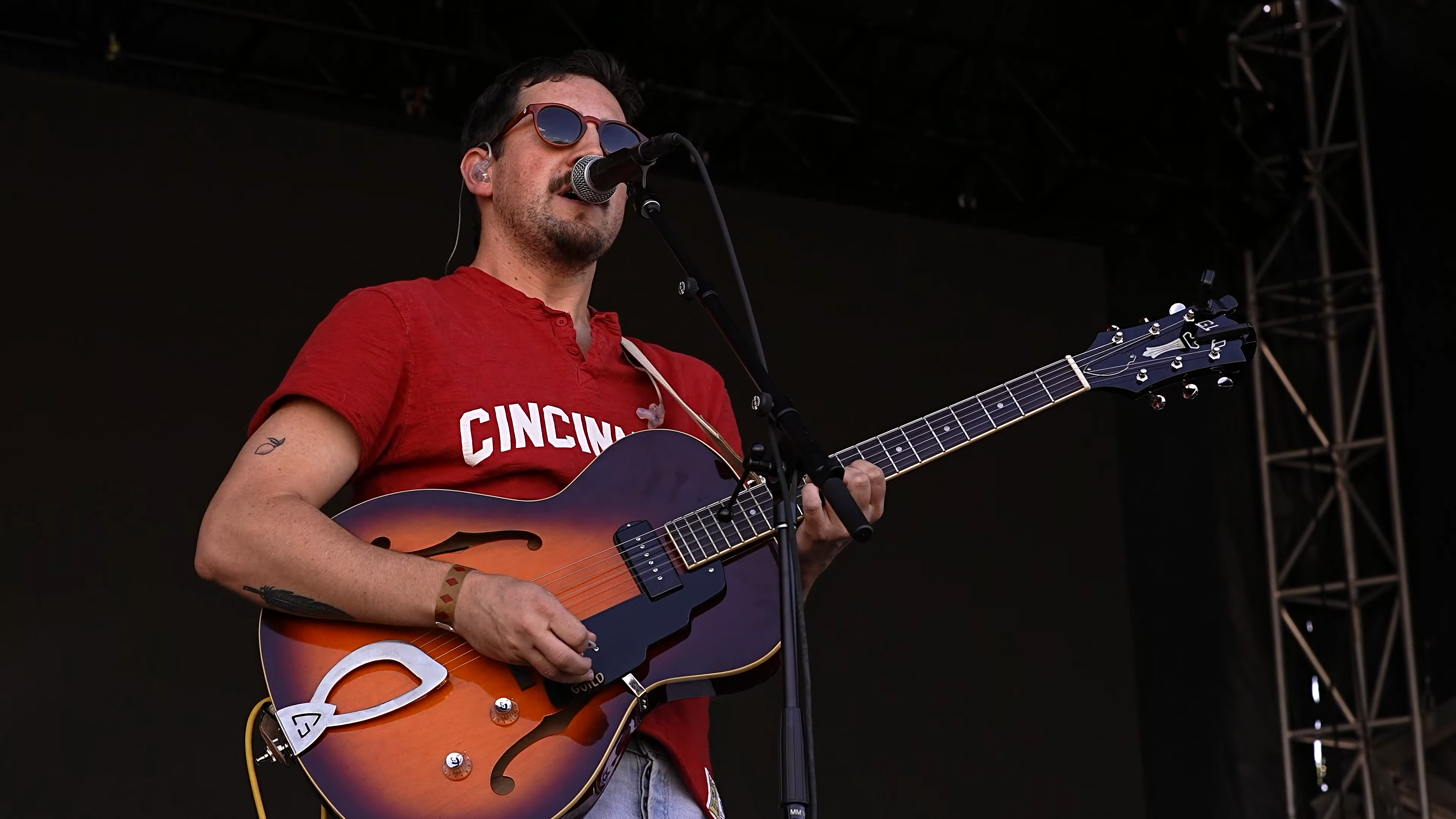
- Marcagi in 2024

Background information
- Born: Cincinnati, Ohio, US
- Genres: Americana; alternative
- Years active: 2023–present
- Label: Warner
- Partner: Gabbi Jennings (2025-present)

Michael Marcagi is an American singer-songwriter from Cincinnati, Ohio.

== Early life and education ==
Marcagi was raised in the suburbs of Cincinnati and attended Anderson High School. In 2014, he graduated from Thomas More College (later: University), where he played collegiate golf.

== Career ==
Prior to his solo career, Marcagi performed in a band called the Heavy Hours.

Marcagi released his solo debut single, "The Other Side", in December 2023. The following month, he announced he had signed to Warner Records and released a second single, "Scared to Start". Aided by popularity on TikTok, "Scared to Start" marked Marcagi's first entry on the Billboard Hot 100. Both singles were included on Marcagi's debut EP, American Romance, released in February 2024.

=== Touring ===
Marcagi opened for Noah Kahan's Oceania leg of The Great Divide Tour in fall 2026.

== Personal life ==
Michael Marcagi is dating professional runner, Gabrielle Jennings. They both reside in Boulder, Colorado when not travelling.

When on tour, Marcagi has played golf with Wesley Schultz from The Lumineers and Noah Kahan. Along with golf, Marcagi also runs to stay active.

== Discography ==
=== Albums ===
List of albums, with selected details
Title	Details
Under the Streetlights	Released: February 6, 2026; Label: Warner

=== Extended plays ===
List of extended plays, with selected details
Title	Details	Peak chart positions	
Title	Details	US	CAN
American Romance	Released: February 8, 2024; Format: Digital download; Label: Warner	195	70
Midwest Kid	Released: April 18, 2025; Format: Digital download; Label: Warner	-	-

=== Singles ===
List of singles with selected chart positions and certifications
Title	Year	Peak chart positions										Certifications	Album
Title	Year	US	AUS	CAN	IRE	NZ	NOR	SWE	SWI	UK	WW	Certifications	Album
"The Other Side"	2023	—	—	—	84	—	—	—	—	—	—		American Romance
"Scared to Start"	2024	54	12	20	4	13	13	19	16	9	35	RIAA: 2× Platinum; ARIA: 3× Platinum; BPI: 2× Platinum; IFPI SWI: Gold; MC: 5× Platinum; RMNZ: 2× Platinum	American Romance
"Good Enough"	2024	—	—	—	—	—	—	—	—	—	—		Non-album singles
"Keep Me Honest"	2024	—	—	—	—	—	—	—	—	—	—		Non-album singles
"Midwest Kid"	2025	—	—	—	—	—	—	—	—	—	—		Midwest Kid
"Flyover State"	2025	—	—	—	—	—	—	—	—	—	—		Midwest Kid
"Follows You"	2025	—	—	—	—	—	—	—	—	—	—		Midwest Kid
"Wish I Never Met You" (with Wesley Schultz)	2025	—	—	—	—	—	—	—	—	—	—		Midwest Kid
"Humbling"	2025	—	—	—	—	—	—	—	—	—	—		Non-album single
"Unlocks Me"	2025	—	—	—	—	—	—	—	—	—	—		Under the Streetlights
"Didn't Include Me (American Dream)"	2026	—	—	—	—	—	—	—	—	—	—		Under the Streetlights
"Wait All Night" (with Gryffin and Lost Frequencies)	2026	_	_	_	_	_	_	_	_	_	-		
