= Simone Felice =

Italian engraver

Simone Felice was a 17th-century Italian engraver, who, together with Giovanni Battista Falda, engraved a collection of prints, entitled Le Giardini di Roma.
