= Channel 44 =

Channel 44 may refer to several television stations:

== Australia ==
- Community television in Australia, various stations operating on digital channel 44
  - Channel 44 (Adelaide), a community television station in Adelaide, South Australia
  - C31 Melbourne, Melbourne, Victoria
  - Hitchhike TV, Brisbane, Queensland (defunct)
  - West TV, Perth, Western Australia (defunct)
- Digital Forty Four, a defunct trial datacasting service in Sydney, Australia

== Bahrain ==
- Channel 44 (Bahrain), a public television station; see Television in Bahrain

== Canada ==
The following television stations operate on virtual channel 44 in Canada:

- CFTF-DT-11 in Carleton-sur-Mer, Quebec

== Mexico ==
The following television stations operate on virtual channel 44 in Mexico:

- XHIJ-TDT in Ciudad Juárez, Chihuahua

- XHICCH-TDT in Chihuahua, Chihuahua

- XHUDG-TDT in Guadalajara, Jalisco

- XHPBGZ-TDT in Ciudad Guzmán, Jalisco
- XHPBLM-TDT in Lagos de Moreno, Jalisco
- XHCPAF-TDT in Puerto Vallarta, Jalisco

- XHFZC-TDT in Zacatecas, Zacatecas

== Philippines ==
- DWFU-DTV in San Fernando, Pampanga
- DWJJ-TV in Jalajala, Rizal Province

== United States ==
The following television stations, which are no longer broadcasting, formerly branded themselves as channel 44:

- Miami Valley Channel (UPN 44), a cable-only station in Dayton, Ohio

== See also ==
- Channel 44 virtual TV stations in the United States

For UHF frequencies covering 650-656 MHz:

- Channel 44 TV stations in Canada
- Channel 44 digital TV stations in the United States
- Channel 44 low-power TV stations in the United States
