= Channel 17 =

Channel 17 refers to several television stations:

== Canada ==
The following television stations operate on virtual channel 17 in Canada:

- CFTF-DT-2 in Trois-Pistoles, Quebec
- CIVI-DT-2 in Vancouver, British Columbia
- CIVM-DT in Montreal, Quebec
- CJIL-DT in Lethbridge, Alberta

== China ==
- CCTV-17, a Chinese television channel

== Mexico ==
The following regional network and local station operate on virtual channel 17 in Mexico:

=== Regional networks ===
- Jalisco TV in the state of Jalisco

=== Local stations ===
- XEFE-TDT in Nuevo Laredo, Tamaulipas

== United States ==
The following television stations, which are no longer broadcasting, formerly branded themselves as channel 17:

- Miami Valley Channel (UPN 17), a cable-only station in Dayton, Ohio

== See also ==
- Channel 17 virtual TV stations in the United States

For UHF frequencies covering 488-494 MHz:

- Channel 17 TV stations in Canada
- Channel 17 TV stations in Mexico
- Channel 17 digital TV stations in the United States
- Channel 17 low-power TV stations in the United States
