= Impact of the Music of the Spheres World Tour =

Cultural influence of Coldplay's eighth concert tour

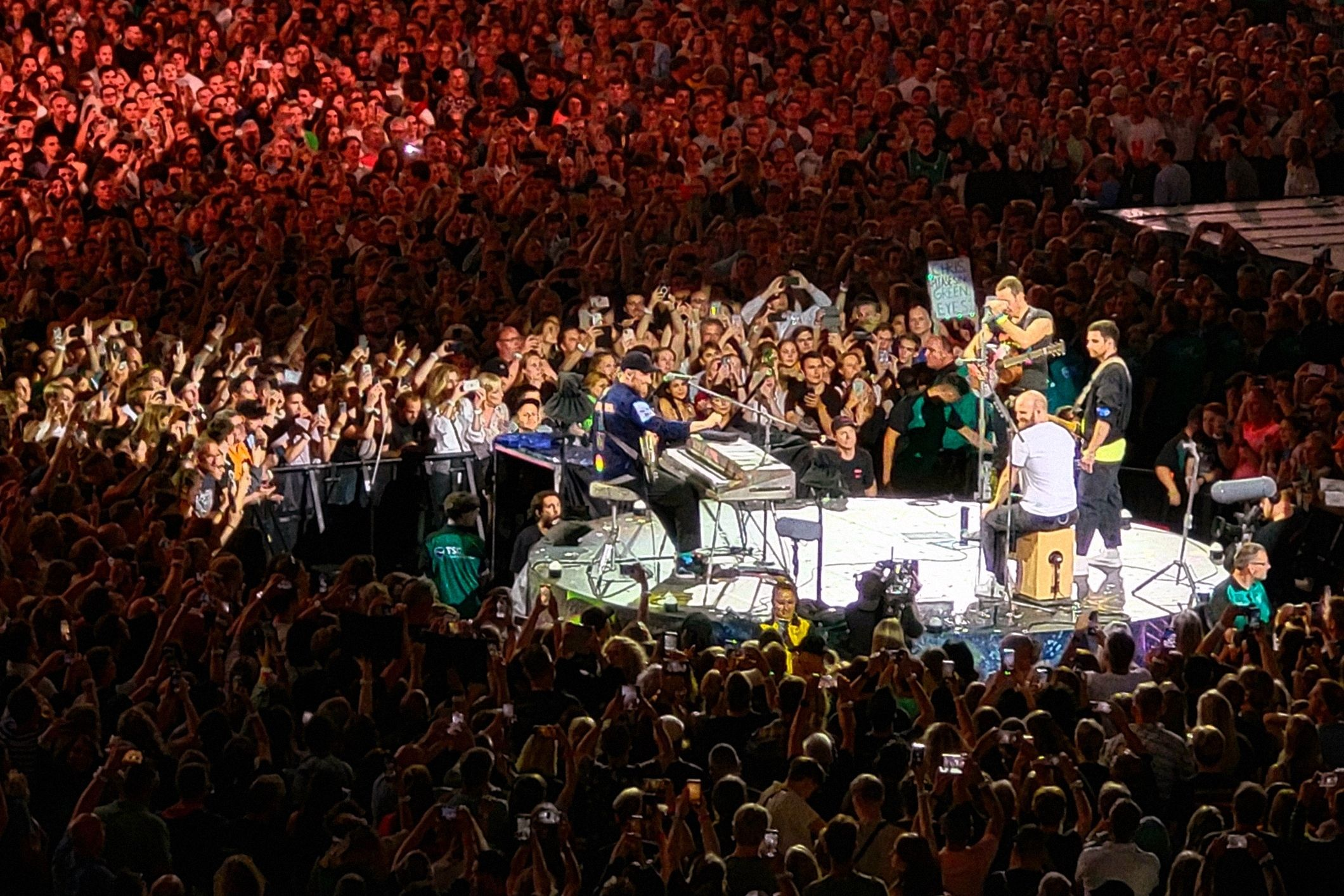
Coldplay at the Johan Cruyff Arena in 2023

The Music of the Spheres World Tour (2022–2025) by British rock band Coldplay had a widely documented environmental, cultural and economic impact, which further emphasised their influence on entertainment. Regarded as "the greatest live music show that humans have yet devised" by The Times, it became the most-attended tour in history and the first by a group to earn $1 billion in revenue. The concert run also marked a return to live performance for the band after the COVID-19 pandemic and its extensive media coverage contributed to a shift in public perception of the group.

When announcing the initial dates, Coldplay revealed a sustainability plan to reduce their CO_{2} emissions by 50% compared to the Head Full of Dreams Tour (2016–2017). These plans encompassed developing new LED stage products and partnering with BMW to create the first rechargeable mobile show battery in the world. However, the battery initiative and the selection of Neste as their biofuel supplier drew accusations of greenwashing. Nevertheless, the group managed to reduce their carbon footprint by 59% and planted over 9 million trees. Pollstar stated that they ushered into "a new era of sustainable touring", while Time ranked them among the most influential climate action leaders.

Demand for the shows was unprecedented, breaking records and luring ticketless fans outside venues in cities such as Barcelona, Kuala Lumpur, Munich and El Paso. Seismologists in Berlin and Kaohsiung reported tremors due to audience activity. Issues concerning ticket touting, event documentation and scheduling prompted legislative reforms in multiple countries. Tour stops experienced a financial boost in commerce, hospitality and public transport as well. Regions including Argentina, Singapore, Ireland and the United Kingdom saw broader macroeconomic effects. Controversy arose at times, most notably surrounding an affair scandal in the United States. Coldplay's discography also had a resurgence in sales and streams, impacting record charts worldwide. To foster philanthropic activities, the band partnered with Global Citizen and the Love Button Global Movement.

== Sustainable touring ==
=== Industry response ===
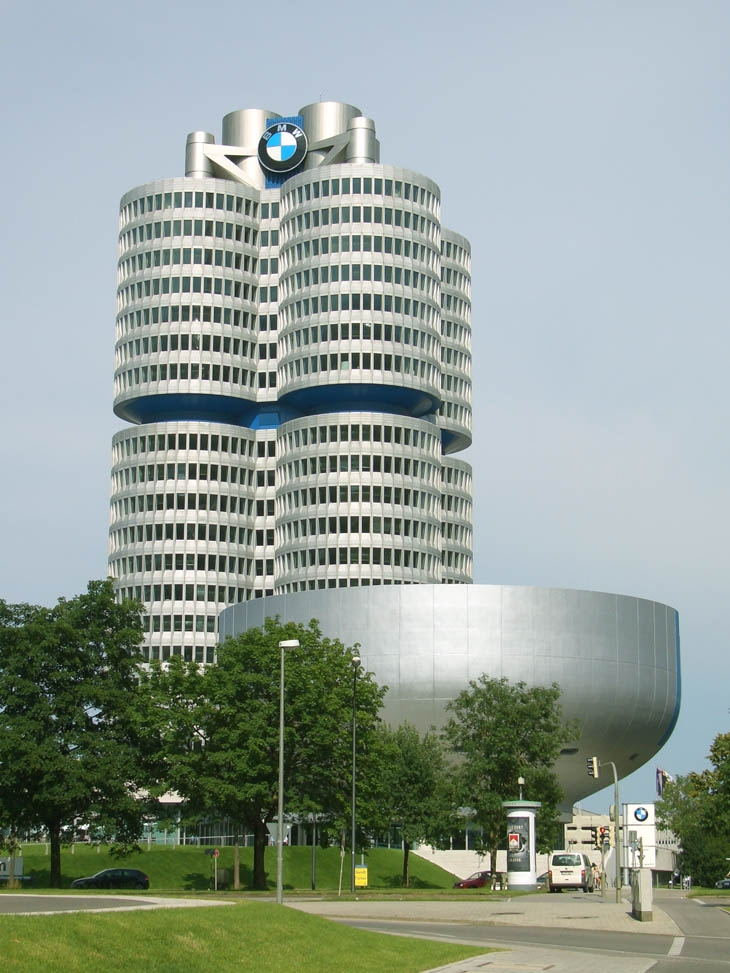
Coldplay developed the first mobile rechargeable show battery in the world through a partnership with BMW.

Following the release of Coldplay's eighth album, Everyday Life (2019), Chris Martin said the band would not be touring until they could ensure their concerts are environmentally friendly. The record was promoted with small shows for charity and a performance at the Amman Citadel in Jordan, broadcast by YouTube. On 14 October 2021, a day before Music of the Spheres was made available, the group posted on social media they were returning to live entertainment after the COVID-19 pandemic. The announcement also included a series of environmental plans developed in two years with help from sustainability experts; they were aimed at reducing CO_{2} emissions by 50% in comparison to their previous tour. Furthermore, the group established a partnership with BMW to create the first mobile rechargeable show battery in the world.

Le Soir's Didier Zacharie affirmed that the efforts proposed by Coldplay were unprecedented for a stadium concert run and added their initiative was commendable. Alex Duke from Impact said the band were "redefining the rulebook" in a world that "desperately needs radical climate action" and praised them for bringing environmental issues to the forefront of international music news through a pioneering endeavour. In an article for Vogue Scandinavia, Doris Daga observed the tour set the bar for how artists could contribute to mitigate their environmental impact and complimented the band's transparency on "the reality that no [show] will be carbon negative in 2022".

According to Lucy August-Perna, the sustainability director of Live Nation, Coldplay's proposal helped to "build on the framework [the company] had been developing over the past five years on their tours and venues". She also described the measures created by the group as "impressive and forward-thinking", since they focused on concrete solutions. Additionally, the director claimed she was working to adopt their plans, institutionalise what they learn and provide environmentally conscious options for more performers worldwide.

Writing for Veja, Amanda Capuano commented that the concert residency template used by Coldplay on the tour schedule underscored a trend previously seen with Adele and Harry Styles, where musicians with sizable demand are travelling less due to an increased interest in logistics, quality of life and mental health. Moreover, the group's collaboration with John Wiseman from Worldwide Sales and Frederic Opsomer from PRG Projects led to the development of completely new LED stage products. Opsomer attested that the custom technology built for the concert run will become commonplace in the next years as well, thanking Coldplay for the initiative. Uproxx and Billboard later noticed they had an impact on tours from Billie Eilish and Shawn Mendes, respectively. In 2023, the Kappa FuturFestival took measures similar to the Music of the Spheres World Tour, while 2024 saw the band receiving support from Live Nation and Warner Music Group to fund a carbon footprint study that will suggest practical solutions for live music events at every level.

=== Criticism on partnerships ===
When we announced this tour, we said that we would try our best to make it as sustainable and low carbon-impact as possible, but that it would be a work in progress. That remains true. We don't claim to have got it all right yet.

— Coldplay, 2022

Carlos Calvo Ambel from Transport & Environment declared that Coldplay were "no doubt well-intentioned" but reprimanded their cooperation with Neste. He accused the company of "cynically using [the band] to greenwash its reputation", since biofuels were supplied to the tour while they had links to deforestation; therefore, the partnership should be discontinued to give priority to better solutions. SumOfUs' Eoin Dubsky criticised the ties with BMW and concluded the group needed to take greater care while doing their diligences, as the multinational was lobbying to prevent the European Union from establishing a deadline for vehicles to become carbon neutral.

On the same day, Coldplay published a statement reiterating that their plan was a work in progress and they "genuinely welcome suggestions as to how to do it better". The band also emphasised having no connection to BMW's corporate policies, adding that various car manufacturers were approached in order to provide the required expertise and the company was the one that helped. Neste separately mentioned that investigations regarding their palm oil vendors were launched, but no evidence of violations or links to deforestation was found. Their response crew said that the concert run only received fuels with frying and animal fat waste as well. The coalition was formally terminated in January 2023.

=== Reduced emissions ===
A team managed by professor John Fernandez at the Massachusetts Institute of Technology (MIT) collected data from the concerts and measured it against the Head Full of Dreams Tour (2016–2017), showing that Coldplay successfully reduced their CO_{2} emissions by 59%. Research attested 72% of all waste was diverted from landfills, while the production of LED wristbands fell by 80%. Average return rates for the item reached 86% per date in the first year. More than 9,625 meals and 90 kg of toiletries were given away from the catering to unhoused and unsheltered people. The solar power installations, kinetic floors and stationary bicycles have produced 15 kWh every show, enough to fuel the C-stage and charging stations for the crew. It was also stated that performances operated entirely on renewable energy.

Coldplay were recognised as pioneers for the future of sustainability in live music as a result. Fernandez hailed their efforts as "critically important, scientifically rigorous and of the highest". In June 2023, BBC News interviewed senior cleansing officer Samantha Thomas on concert waste and she informed that the streets were much cleaner after the group performed at Principality Stadium in comparison to other major events. Gaffa's Jim Knutsson argued that the tour established itself as a platform to promote green technology and environmental commitment. Live Nation said that 9 million trees have been planted by the band across different forest reserves. In November 2023, they were featured on the inaugural Time 100 Climate ranking, which highlighted the most influential climate action leaders based on their recent and measurable achievements.

== Popular culture ==
=== Media coverage ===
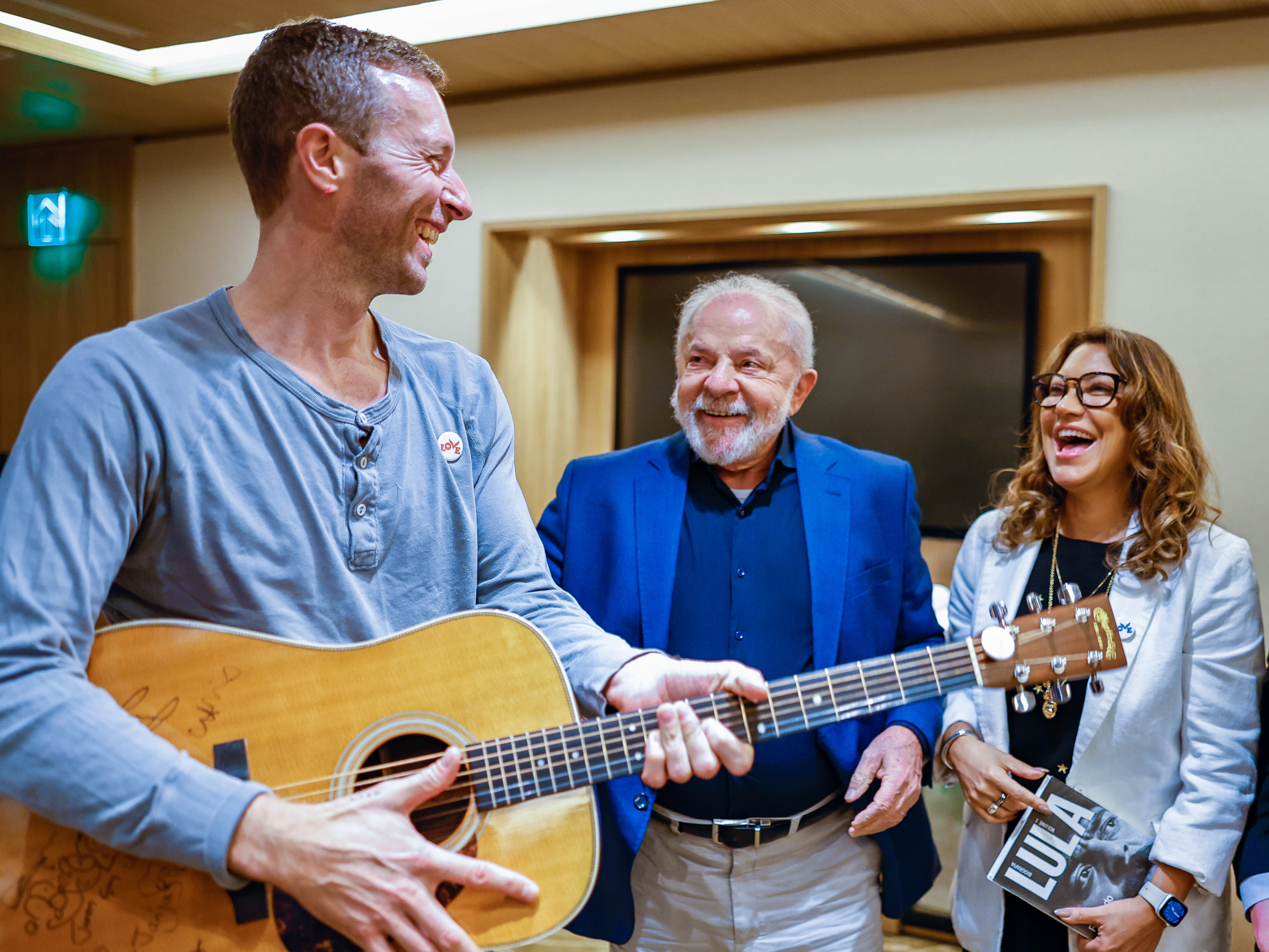
Martin giving a guitar to Brazilian President Lula da Silva and First Lady Janja during their meeting in 2023

Discussing the impact of the tour on La Gaceta, Pablo Hamada considered it a media phenomenon which brought a wave of positivity beyond the shows, as Coldplay became a prominent topic of news coverage and online engagement in the places they visited. He associated the fanaticism over the band with their generational importance. Sofía Campos from La Razón wrote that their performances appeal to multiple age demographics. The Washington Post's Sonia Rao mentioned that the concerts provided "a taste of a long-lost monoculture". Mark Beaumont observed that even the most sceptical critics of the group were turned into admirers on his column for The Times, emphasising that their dedication to live spectacles has regained them respect and credibility in all quarters.

Brazilian outlets coined the term "Coldplaymania" to describe their media dominance, given how the tour was subject of intense scrutiny in the country. Julio Maria from Estadão praised the band as "the last rock creation with the potential to fill stadiums". President Lula da Silva invited them to attend the 2025 United Nations Climate Change Conference. Following their show at Rock in Rio, spin-off festival The Town distributed LED wristbands. Samba schools employed them at the Sapucaí Carnival Parades as well. Warner Music's Marcela Moreira said the group inspired how Bruno Mars led his visit to Brazil in 2023.

Publications have also reported on brands and companies launching campaigns referencing the tour once Coldplay announced dates in their respective countries. Celebrities from various fields garnered attention at the concerts, including those in cinema, television, music, and sports. Labour Party leader Keir Starmer faced backlash for accepting free tickets to watch the band at Manchester's Etihad Stadium. President Bongbong Marcos was scrutinised for using a helicopter to arrive at the Philippine Arena in Bocaue, while the public struggled with traffic congestion. Chancellor Karl Nehammer joined one of the Ernst-Happel-Stadion dates to inspect the security strategies adopted following the 2024 Vienna terrorism plot. Ta Nea writer Giorgos Skintsas stated that the shows in Athens overshadowed the European Parliament election that year. Jeff Speed from The Yorkshire Post recognised the tour as a "monolithic event". The Telegraph's James Hall argued that its positive reception cemented Coldplay as the best live band in the world.

=== Crowd phenomena ===
Several ticketless fans rallied outside their respective venues to witness the band perform in Barcelona, Zurich, Kaohsiung, Kuala Lumpur, Singapore, Helsinki, and Goyang. They also drew 34,000 spectators to Munich's Olympiapark. Hundreds of people climbed the Sun Bowl mountain in El Paso. On 10 July 2022, seismic stations near Berlin detected a 1.28-magnitude earthquake, which was attributed to Coldplay's first night at Olympiastadion. After learning what had happened, the group encouraged attendees to surpass that number, prompting a 1.5-magnitude earthquake on both 12 and 13 July. These new reports eclipsed Florence and the Machine playing "Dog Days Are Over" at the Tempelhof Sounds Festival. A year later, tremors were felt in the Kaohsiung National Stadium district. Vodafone UK stated that over 258 gigabytes of data were uploaded during Coldplay's headlining set at Glastonbury Festival on 29 June 2024, the equivalent of 74,000 high-resolution pictures. Their Kai Tak Sports Park shows established a new record for late-night border clearances between Hong Kong and Mainland China, with the Huanggang Port managing 12,000 travellers in four hours. EE registered more than 47 terabytes of network traffic when the band fulfilled their 10 concerts at Wembley Stadium in 2025. It was the highest figure of the summer, placing them above Oasis.

=== Tributes and honours ===
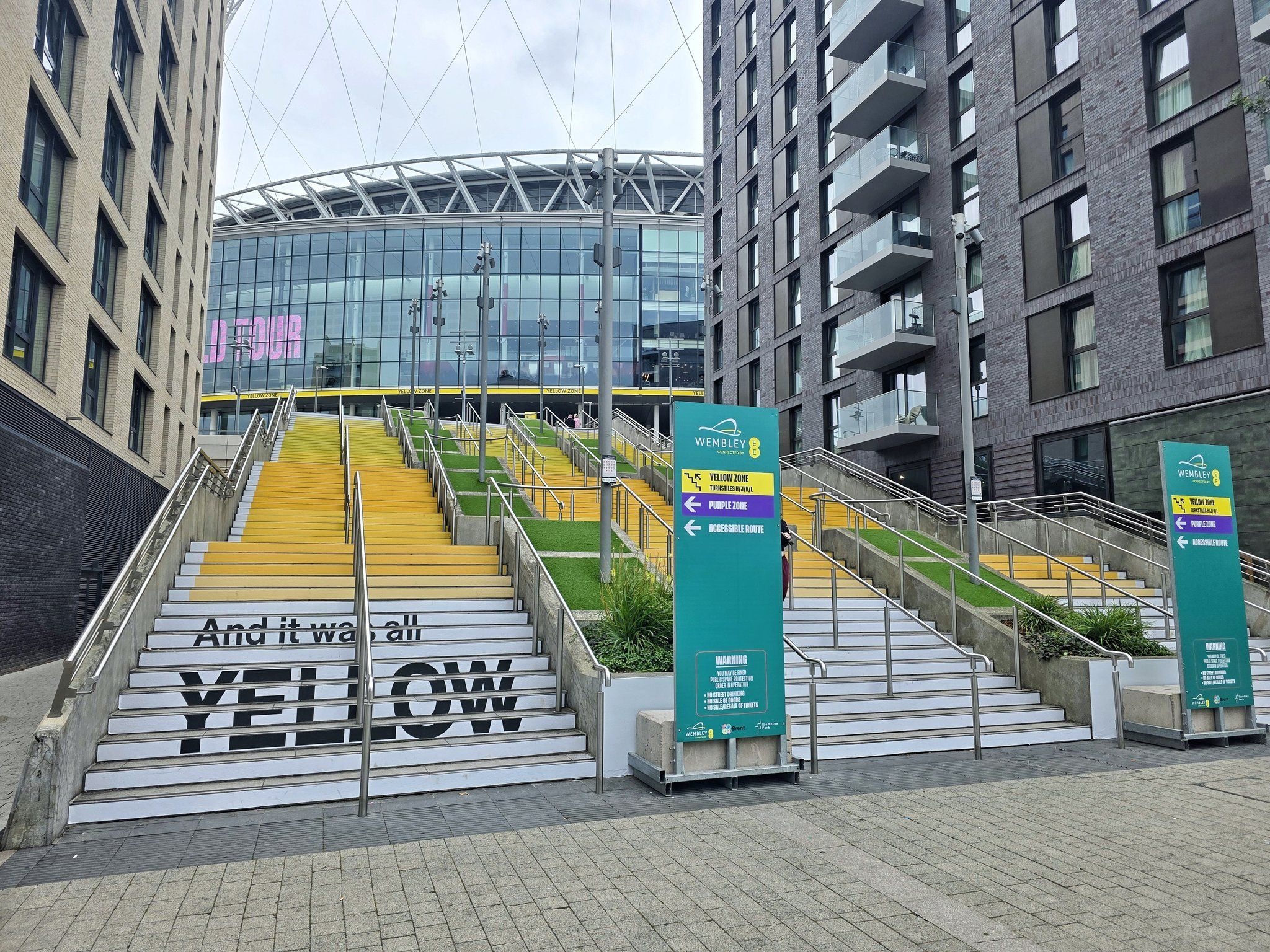
Wembley Park's Spanish Steps painted in yellow for Coldplay

- The United Nations presented Coldplay with the World Bicycle Day Special Award for including stationary bicycles on their stage.
- Rolling Stone circulated special issues of the magazine in France, Argentina, and Brazil to celebrate the tour.
- The Municipal Chamber of Rio de Janeiro nominated the band for the Pedro Ernesto Medal. Voting is pending as of December 2022.
- Blitz celebrated their return to Portugal with an exclusive photography exhibit at the Alma Shopping in Coimbra.
- La Repubblica honoured the concerts at Stadio Diego Armando Maradona in Naples by publishing a bespoke illustration.
- Soundz released an exclusive volume focused on the group for the shows at the Johan Cruyff Arena in Amsterdam.
- Rockin'On Japan paid tribute to the Tokyo Dome performances by exploring their discography in its December 2023 edition.
- Prime Minister Lawrence Wong proclaimed 23–31 January the "Coldplay Week" to mark the Singapore National Stadium residency.
- Helsinki was temporarily renamed "Coldsinki" for their Finnish live debut at the Olympic Stadium.
- Melbourne's Marvel Stadium arranged a permanent installation after they broke attendance records at the venue.
- Eden Park commissioned a mural to honour their three nights in Auckland. The New Zealand Herald sponsored a pictorial map inspired by Moon Music (2024) as well.
- The Earth Day Organisation dedicated its Artists for the Earth Ambassador Award to Coldplay in recognition of their commitment to sustainability in live entertainment.
- Governor Bill Lee of Tennessee approved a resolution welcoming them to Nashville's Nissan Stadium, in addition to honoring their musical, cultural and philanthropic impact.
- Mayor Renard Johnson presented the Key of El Paso to the band before they played at the Sun Bowl. He also proclaimed 13–14 June the "Coldplay Days".
- Wembley Park collaborated with Pantone to embellish the Spanish Steps in multiple shades of yellow as a reference to the song and the concerts at Wembley Stadium.

== Controversies ==
=== Southeast Asia ===
Coldplay were criticised by several groups of conservative Muslims for performing in Indonesia and Malaysia. Novel Bamukmin, the Deputy Secretary-General of PA 212, declared the tour should be cancelled in Jakarta because the band endorsed the LGBT community, while Nasrudin Hassan from the Malaysian Islamic Party condemned them for promoting a culture of "hedonism" and "deviance". Conversely, Minister for Tourism Sandiaga Uno argued that the tour would enhance Indonesia's reputation as a destination for international artists. Syed Saddiq Syed Abdul Rahman likewise regarded it as a chance to generate economic surplus for Kuala Lumpur. On 10 November 2023, dozens of people marched outside Jakarta's British Embassy calling for the cancellation of the Gelora Bung Karno Stadium show. They defended that Indonesian Muslims should be mourning the war crimes Israel committed against Palestine instead of watching Coldplay live. Extremist groups threatened to burn down their stage set-up, while others only asked the police to ensure the venue did not include "LGBT propaganda". In Malaysia, Prime Minister Anwar Ibrahim said that boycott requests were overblown because the band supported Palestine, but authorities would be alert. Martin replaced his pride flag with one that read "Love" and both concerts went on as usual.

=== Romania ===
During their first performance in Bucharest, Coldplay welcomed Romanian singer Babasha to the stage for "Păi Naa", a song from the manele genre. Members of the audience at the Arena Națională booed him and the occurrence became subject of public debate. Aleksandar Brezar told Euronews that, despite its long history, the style is derided by critics for using "crude language and banal lyrics", being comparable to rap and reggaeton because all three emerged from marginalised groups and became mainstream. Several cities in the country have banned manele from common areas, but it remained popular nevertheless. Addressing the situation on social media, Babasha pointed out that he already expected polarising reactions, citing the racism against his Romani origins among the incentives behind them. Republica's Gabriel Balmus likened the backlash to when the 2008 Glastonbury Festival announced that Jay-Z would be a headliner. On the second day, before presenting the singer again, Martin requested people who hated manele to keep an atmosphere of peace and do something else while they were playing together. The collaboration was received with applause instead and Babasha thanked the crowd for showing support to his work. Another repercussion of the incident was evidenced on his Instagram account, which earned more than 20,000 new followers in a single morning.

=== United States ===
On 16 July 2025, a couple at Foxborough's Gillette Stadium were displayed on the screens with their arms wrapped around each other during the Jumbotron Song, a segment where Martin improvised lyrics about those who appeared on the broadcast feed. Instead of reacting positively, the pair tried to hide from the cameras. Videos exhibiting the moment went viral on social media. The duo were subsequently recognised as Andy Byron and Kristin Cabot of Astronomer, an artificial intelligence startup worth $1 billion. Both held chief officer positions and had spouses absent from the show, prompting accusations of an extramarital relationship. They were placed on leave and Astronomer started a formal investigation. The episode became subject of memes, sketches and debates on privacy. Some outlets referred to it as "Coldplaygate". Jonathan Mann produced a mobile game based on what happened. Pornhub reported a growth in demand for office and cheating-themed works. Numerous fake news items gained traction, such as the woman next to the pair being an office colleague. Astronomer revealed that Byron and Cabot stepped down in the following week. Months later, The Times interviewed Cabot and she clarified that both had split from their partners beforehand. Pepsi referenced the incident on its Super Bowl LX advertisement in 2026.

== Economy ==
=== Demand and politics ===
Our expectations were high and we were aggressive in terms of the routing, but it has surpassed any expectations. It's truly remarkable. The band [are] a juggernaut, a true powerhouse and we're really excited to be involved.

— Bruce Moran, 2022

Sales for the tour caused public debate due to unprecedented demand in Asia, Europe, Latin America, and Oceania. Coldplay initially announced only two dates in Perth for latter continent through a partnership with the government of Western Australia, leading to criticism from fans who resided elsewhere. Conversely, Live Nation's Bruce Moran applauded the band for mapping "the most spectacular run through Latin America ever", since their performances broke records in nearly all countries in the region. Interviewed by Billboard, Bruno Del Granado from CAA noted that Coldplay's success and the establishment of new arenas proved there was no longer an excuse to avoid the territory.

Interest in the concerts led ticket speculation to rise in Portugal, with 32 offenders being detained. Álvaro Covões, the director of events promoter Everything Is New, affirmed that they are "a global phenomenon which only happens once every 30 years" and compared the public frenzy to when the Beatles were active. The Organization of Consumers and Users (OCU) submitted an appeal to prevent resales with abusive prices and faulty warranties at the Spanish Ministry of Consumer Affairs. In Italy, the Authority for Communications Guarantees (AGCOM) launched an operation against touts focused on the shows that Coldplay scheduled and arrested 26 lawbreakers.

Fahmi Fadzil revealed that the government of Malaysia would enact legislation to monitor and control transactions in the secondary market after tickets for Kuala Lumpur were traded at disproportionately high values. Reviewing such cases helped them write the first drafts. Bloomberg News stated that the government of Indonesia decided to simplify their event permits because the band had numerous extra dates in neighbouring capitals, but not in Jakarta. Sales for Navi Mumbai drew 13 million users, leading a public interest litigation to be filed at the Bombay High Court. The Enforcement Directorate raided five states to investigate illegal conduct. Erik Hoffman from Live Nation remarked that the idea for Rogers Stadium came up when they failed to arrange a Toronto venue that could properly host Coldplay. The group stirred discussion on entry prices as well, maintaining affordability despite the economic impact of the COVID-19 pandemic. Acts like Olivia Rodrigo and Adele launched their own version of the Infinity Ticket program.

=== Local business ===
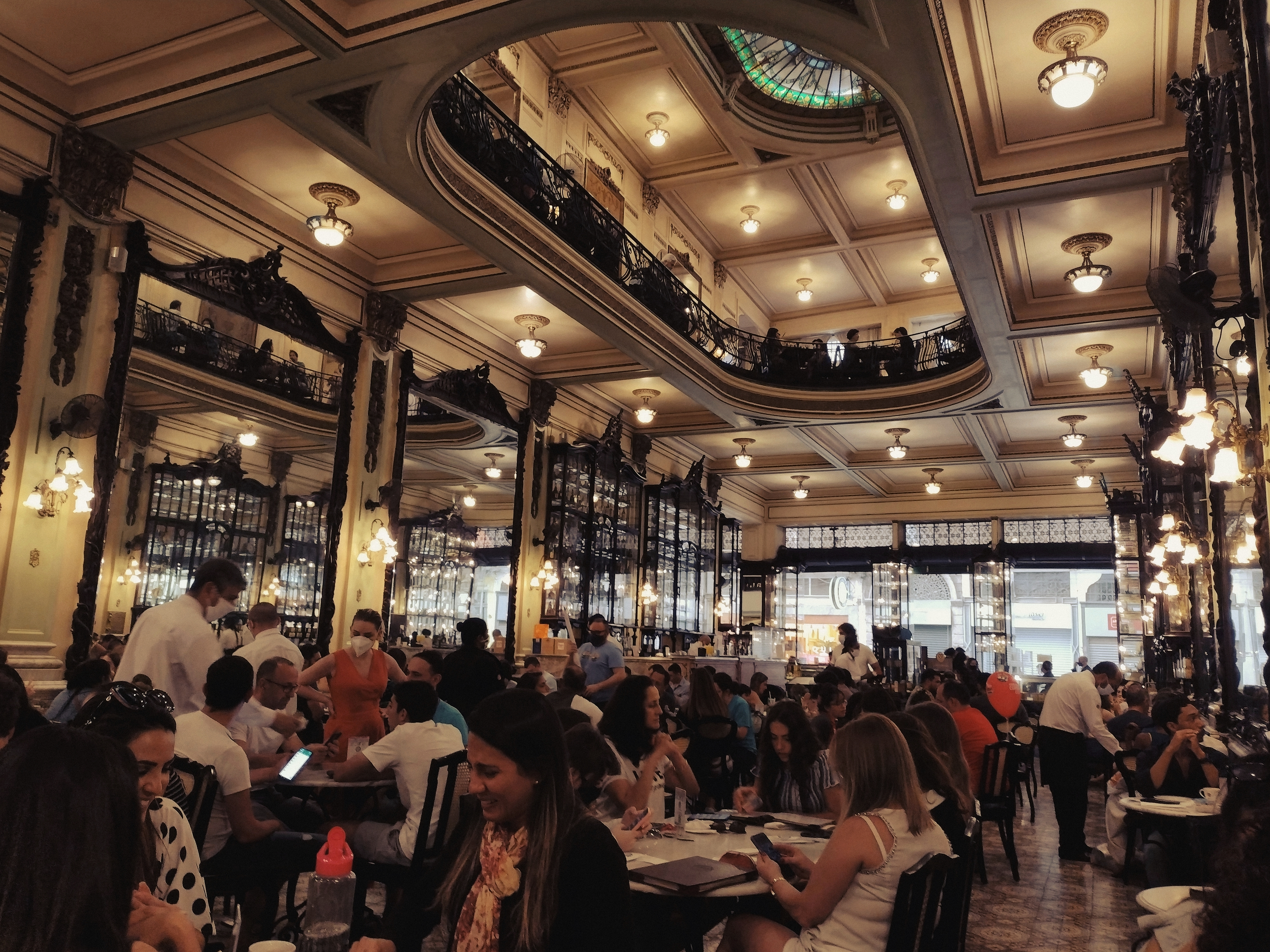
Cities visited by the tour enjoyed a financial surge in hotels, restaurants, bars and many other services.

Coldplay were recognised for driving up local businesses at various tour stops. Hotels that offered a view for Estadio Nacional de Costa Rica in San José became fully booked after ticket sales, as people weighed different approaches to watch the band. El Espectador observed that accommodation occupancy rates exceeded 85% during their stay in Bogotá. Buenos Aires documented its highest percentage in the past 10 years over the residency at Estadio River Plate. Clarín noticed that restaurants and bars across the city triplicated their revenue with the tour. Business owners from Curitiba said that its impact was superior to the 2014 FIFA World Cup.

During their stay in Rio de Janeiro, the group yielded profits above R$86 million. Furthermore, the President of the Municipal Chamber of Coimbra informed that they generated more than €36 million in direct financial returns for the town. Hotel prices surged by 1,000% after they announced shows there. Equivalent rises were also seen in places such as Dublin, Düsseldorf, Helsinki, and Singapore (where Agoda reported a 556% boost in searches). Marketing agency Hello Monday held a contest to give away tickets for the nights in Barcelona and drew over a million comments on social media, along with 80,000 new clients on their exclusive platform. Diario de Sevilla considered it one of the most viral advertising campaigns of the year in Spain.

In November 2023, the Kaohsiung City Government offered discount coupons to fans attending the shows in the region to boost revenue at night markets. Around 30,000 citizens were drawn to those businesses. Their earnings grew by 30%, while accommodations reached 90% occupancy. Coldplay generated a record NT$550 million in tourism output as a result. The concert at Jakarta's Gelora Bung Karno Stadium secured Rp1.4 trillion in proceeds. It also optimised venue income by 50%, compared to 2019. Searches for hotel rooms in Perth rose by 135% when the group played at Optus Stadium. Minister for Tourism Rita Saffioti estimated that 3,500 locals would take new jobs because of the tour, including areas like security, transport and cleaning. Kuala Lumpur collected RM200 million with the performance at Bukit Jalil National Stadium.

Profits from Airbnb reservations doubled when Coldplay visited Athens, as they marked an unprecedented 81.5% capacity. About 40,000 attendees were foreigners, which helped the travel sector. The Bucharest City Hall received €112,000 to host the band, making them more lucrative than tournaments such as the Champions League. They drove an economic growth of €63 million in Helsinki. The shows at the Olympiastadion—along with Adele's residency—were associated to Munich's record 2.1 million overnight stays in August 2024. Sydney ($90 million), Auckland ($20 million), Hong Kong (HK$1.2 billion), El Paso ($6 million), and Madison ($13 million) have all registered substantial returns in their respective economies. Hotels near the stadiums where the group performed were nearly sold out in Abu Dhabi, Navi Mumbai and Ahmedabad.

=== Civil transport ===
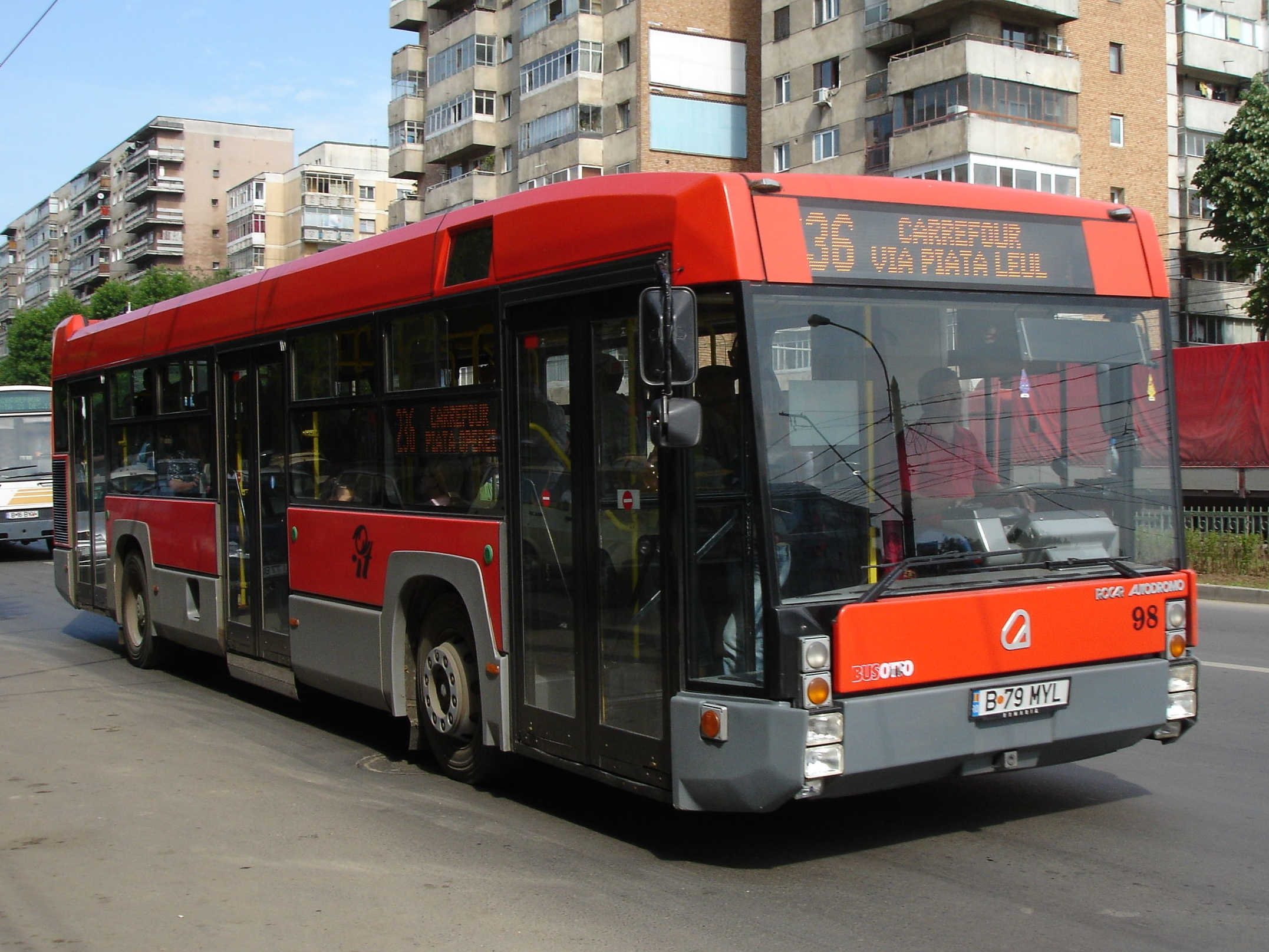
The promotion of sustainable travel led several organisations to report an increase in public transport ridership

As part of their sustainability efforts, Coldplay partnered with SAP to develop an exclusive mobile app for the tour. It measured the carbon footprint generated by attendees and encouraged them to use eco-friendly travel options by offering merchandise discount codes. In the United States, the band worked with public transport companies in four cities to grant affordable rides, improving the turnout by an average of 59% on concert days. Organisations from Brussels, Glasgow, Santiago, Cardiff, Milan, and Bocaue devised efforts to handle the traffic before and after the shows. Tembici and the British Embassy held a contest draw giving tickets to people who presented environmentally friendly ways to arrive at the group's performances in Brazil.

More than 36,000 people boarded the Rio de Janeiro Metro to watch them at Estádio Olímpico Nilton Santos, almost six times the weekdays average. In Gothenburg, visitors earned free public transport to Ullevi after being consulted by members of the Green City Zone project, which outlined travel behaviour to reduce CO_{2} emissions from large-scale events. The Kaohsiung Metro went through its biggest days of activity in 2023 when Coldplay held their shows, with over 565,000 passengers carried in total. Jakarta MRT shared that around 163,000 citizens relied on its routes during the Gelora Bung Karno Stadium date, marking the highest ridership of the 2020s decade.

In Singapore, free bus rides were offered to train stations near the National Stadium until midnight. The Bucharest City Hall established two electric bus lines and added vehicles to previously existing ones for the Arena Națională concerts. Webjet informed that flight bookings to Melbourne and Sydney rose by 47% and 44%, respectively, because of the band, while Qantas claimed they were the reason behind a major uptick in airfare prices. Out of the 340,000 people that went to their shows at the Accor Stadium, 60% used a train or bus to arrive and leave. Transport for NSW (TfNSW) implemented 1,231 extra services to accommodate demand. Air New Zealand scheduled 22 additional flights for the week Coldplay performed at the Eden Park. Auckland Transport (AT) offered ticket holders free bus and train rides to the venue. The band set new records for turnout and revenue at the Ahmedabad Metro, with 405,000 passengers yielding ₹6.6 million in two days. Kingston upon Hull ran free trains to Craven Park.

=== Macroeconomics ===
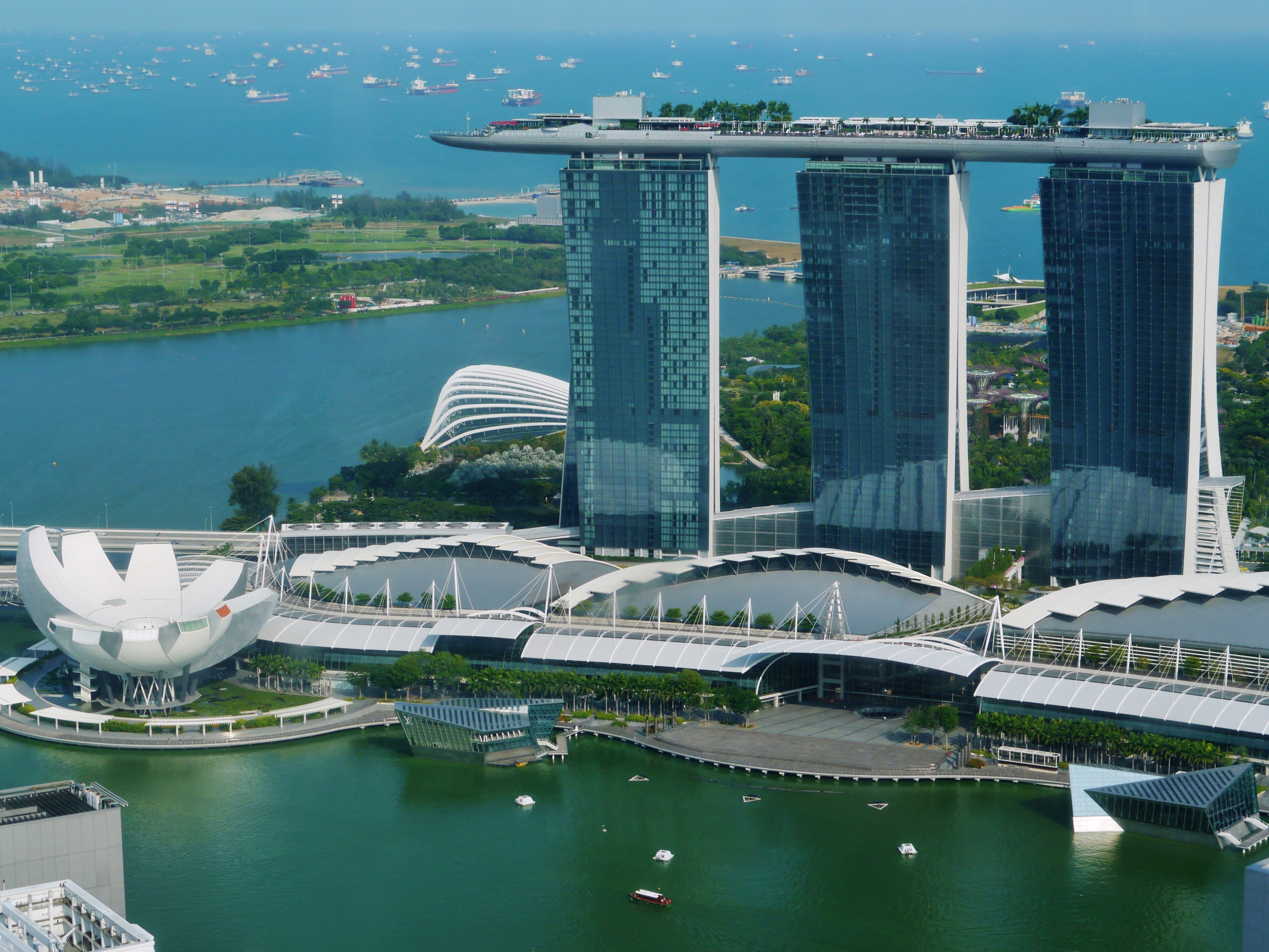
The shows in Singapore were part of a government plan to promote the city as the music capital of Asia.

Several countries experienced a macroeconomic impact associated with the Music of the Spheres World Tour. Referencing the performances at Estadio River Plate, the government of Argentina established the "Coldplay dollar", an exchange rate of the American currency which was used for international live events. Bank Central Asia's stock exchange value enjoyed a boost after it was announced their card holders got exclusive access to the Jakarta presales. According to El Mundo, the band contributed to Spain's concert industry more than any foreign act in 2023. Additionally, the shows in Naples, Milan and Rome impacted Italy by €906.3 million.

The Music observed that the double dates in Perth brought at least $75 million for Western Australian economy, drawing 40,000 out-of-state visitors as well. Premier Roger Cook added that Coldplay have successfully established an itinerary model where the city can be included as part of the Asian tours carried out by other acts. Along with Taylor Swift's Eras Tour, the group yielded $422.7 million in spending and $403.2 million in tourism revenue for Singapore, uplifting quarterly GDP forecasts by 0.25 percentage points. Marketing professor Seshan Ramaswami stated that their residencies extended the region's demographic reach to fans in Asia and the Middle East. As a result, they helped drive Asia–Pacific's travel sector closer to pre-pandemic levels.

Irish Examiner also reported that concert spending in Ireland rose by 88% thanks to Swift and Coldplay. RTÉ claimed that the band registered the biggest ticket sales day of the year nationwide. Their success was identified as a key factor contributing to the annual growth experienced by CTS Eventim (36%), Live Nation (32%), and the United Kingdom's music industry (13%). The shows at Wembley Stadium were attributed to a 13.5% uptick in entertainment spending among Britons. EY-Parthenon estimated that the Navi Mumbai and Ahmedabad dates led to a $75 million surge for the equivalent field in India. Business Today credited the group with opening the concert economy doors across the country. Prime Minister Narendra Modi urged states and private companies to invest on the required infrastructure on his speech for Make in Odisha.

== Other areas ==
=== Philanthropy ===
In addition to donating 10% from all of their profits to charity, Coldplay teamed up with Global Citizen and the Love Button Global Movement to gather volunteers in each tour stop and endorse local non-profit institutions on their individual missions, which included distributing food, creating gardens and providing shelter for refugees. In Newark, participants helped with United Community Corporation's Sky Full of Stars Carnival and Distribution, an event where residents earned free groceries, COVID-19 vaccines and access to mortgage assistance. They also organised a warehouse used by Team Ukraine Love in Warsaw. The foundation's main focus is serving those who were displaced from their homes by the Russian invasion of Ukraine. In Bogotá, the band donated gifts to the children and health personnel at Hospital Simón Bolívar. During the stop in Buenos Aires, volunteers partnered with TECHO, an institution that mobilises youth to improve infrastructure in Latin American countries.

SP Invisível received support for the humanisation of homeless people in São Paulo, as well as the promotion of individualised care experiences. In Coimbra, the initiatives aimed to curtail elderly social exclusion. Other efforts included setting a free clinic in Copenhagen, planting trees in Gothenburg, and helping the Love & Hope Children's Home in Kaohsiung. Aiming to expand access to mental health care, Coldplay auctioned tickets through the Rare Impact and Sweet Relief Musicians funds. Patients and workers at RSIA Bunda Jakarta Hospital were given presents as well. In September 2024, the band revealed that 10% of the income obtained at Wembley Stadium and Craven Park would be donated to the Music Venue Trust, fostering grassroots venues and artists in the United Kingdom. Far Out's Dale Maplethorpe said they could "unite music lovers everywhere" with the endeavour. Sam Fender and Katy Perry pledged to contribute £1 for each admission sold at their British concerts after the group's announcement.

=== Music charts ===
Coldplay's discography experienced a resurgence in sales and streams during the tour, leading multiple works to debut or reach new peaks on record charts worldwide. Following their shows at Estadio Akron in Zapopan, the band rose to number two on Spotify Mexico's Daily Top Artists chart. Warner Music Group certified "My Universe" as a 3× Platinum song in the country, while Music of the Spheres (2021) reached Gold. The album jumped to number 19 on Germany's Offizielle Top 100 with the Frankfurt and Berlin dates. In Belgium, all studio albums they had released up to that point—and Live in Buenos Aires (2018)—returned to both the Flanders and Wallonia rankings. Live 2012 was present on the latter parade as well. After their initial Wembley Stadium trek, "Yellow", "Viva la Vida", and "A Sky Full of Stars" were featured on the UK Singles Chart for the first time since 2014, 2017 and 2016, respectively. "Viva la Vida" outlasted its 2000s run, logging over 90 weeks in the 2020s.

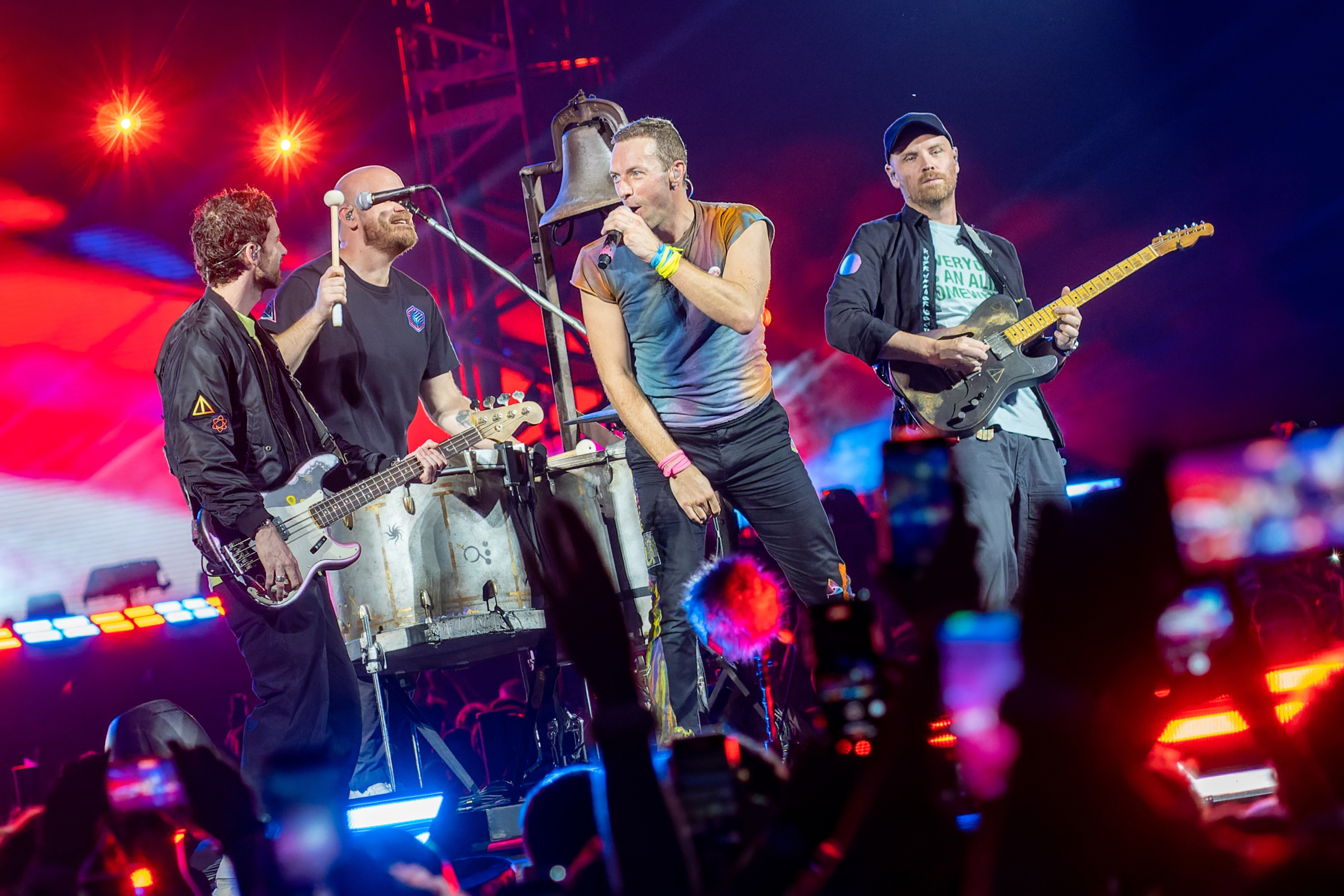
Coldplay performing "Viva la Vida" at Wembley Stadium, London

As a result of their Rock in Rio set, Coldplay became the first international group to lead Spotify Brazil's Daily Top Artists list. In Argentina, Parachutes (2000) achieved a new peak on the albums chart at number six. The feat was repeated in Portugal, where it rose to number three while accompanied by eight other projects. Out of the 13 songs that appeared on the Portuguese Singles Chart, eight secured their best-selling week, including "The Scientist", "Fix You", "Paradise", "Higher Power" and "Sparks".

Other regions to have their sales charts flooded include Italy (7 albums and 4 songs), Switzerland (6 albums and 4 songs), Sweden (8 albums and 12 songs), and the Netherlands (7 albums and 10 songs). Despite not holding a show in Norway, the band had 6 albums and 6 songs ranked on VG-Lista in 2023. The performances in Kaohsiung, Jakarta and Kuala Lumpur allowed "Yellow", "Viva la Vida" and "A Sky Full of Stars" to extend their respective resurgences. As per Infobae, Coldplay were the group with the most searched lyrics of the year on Google in light of the tour. In 2024, "Yellow" achieved their first-ever Philippines Songs Top 10. On Singapore's Top Streaming Chart, 17 out of the 30 slots available were occupied by them.

During the third European leg, the band managed to score entries on the rankings from Greece (2 albums and 13 songs), Finland (8 albums and 11 songs), Austria (8 albums and 13 songs), and Ireland (6 albums and 4 songs). No tracks charted separately in Hungary, but six records climbed back to the Top 40. Moon Music (2024) hit number one in Australia for the first time after the Melbourne and Sydney concerts. It jumped to number 10 in New Zealand, where "Feelslikeimfallinginlove" and "We Pray" peaked at numbers 17 and 21, respectively. Coldplay secured 17 entries on the catalogue parades as well. By the end of the second Asian leg, they had 11 simultaneous appearances on the Official MENA Chart's Emirati section; five on IMI International Top 20 Singles; seven on Hong Kong Songs; and six on the Circle Download Chart. Following a viral performance at the Allegiant Stadium in Paradise, "Sparks" debuted on the Billboard Hot 100 and Parachutes (2000) returned to the Billboard 200.

== Achievements ==
=== Rankings and listicles ===
List of rankings and listicles
Publication	Year	Description	Result	Ref.
Bangkok Post	2024	The Best Concerts of 2024	Placed	
BBC Music	2024	10 Unmissable Moments from Glastonbury 2024	Placed	
Billboard	2022	The Year's Top 5 Concert Special Effects	2	
Billboard	2025	The 100 Most Iconic Pop Star Memes of All Time (Coldplaygate)	26	
Canal 44	2022	The Best Concerts of 2022 in Guadalajara	Placed	
ClutchPoints	2025	The Best Concerts of 2025	3	
Deadline	2025	Top Viral Social Media Moments of 2025 (Coldplaygate)	Placed	
Deezer	2023	The 17 Best Festival Performances of All Time	Placed	
Elle	2025	The 40 Best Pop Culture Moments and Trends of 2025 (Coldplaygate)	Placed	
ET BrandEquity	2024	Biggest Trends That Shaped India's Pop Culture in 2024	Placed	
Firstpost	2025	The Most Shocking and Viral Moments of 2025 (Coldplaygate)	Placed	
Folha de São Paulo	2022	The Best Shows of Rock in Rio 2022	Placed	
G1	2022	The Highlights of Rock in Rio 2022	6	
The Guardian	2026	33 Scandalous Photos That Shocked the World (Coldplaygate)	Placed	
The Hollywood Reporter	2025	Best and Worst Viral Social Media Moments of 2025 (Coldplaygate)	Placed	
The Independent	2025	Biggest Showbiz Stories of 2025 (Coldplaygate)	Placed	
IQ	2025	The Top Live Music Industry Stories of 2025	Placed	
Irish Examiner	2024	The 10 Best Gigs in Ireland in 2024	1	
Las Vegas Sun	2025	Concert Moments to Remember from 2025	2	
Louder	2024	11 Acts That Defined Glastonbury 2024	Placed	
Mothership	2024	10 Best & Biggest Moments in Singapore in 2024	1	
The National	2025	The United Arab Emirates' 20 Best Live Shows of 2025	1	
NBC News	2025	The Cultural Moments That Defined 2025 (Coldplaygate)	Placed	
Newsweek	2025	25 Major Pop Culture Moments of 2025 (Coldplaygate)	9	
O Globo	2022	Rock in Rio 2022: The 10 Best Shows	Placed	
Panorama	2023	The 10 Best Concerts of 2023	10	
People	2025	The Worst and Most Oops Moments of 2025 (Coldplaygate)	2	
Rock & Pop	2022	The 10 Best Concerts of 2022	2	
Rolling Stone	2025	The 25 Best Memes of 2025 (Coldplaygate)	20	
Sky TG24	2023	The 10 Tours to Remember 2023	7	
The Star	2025	10 Events That Defined 2025 in Entertainment	Placed	
The Sydney Morning Herald	2025	Top Pop Culture Moments of 2025 (Coldplaygate)	1	
The Telegraph	2025	The 26 Most Remarkable Moments of 2025 (Coldplaygate)	Placed	
The Times	2024	The Very Best Pictures of 2024	Placed	
The Times of India	2025	What India Talked About in 2025	Placed	
Toronto Star	2025	Top 12 Culture Moments of 2025 (Coldplaygate)	3	
UOL	2022	Rock in Rio 2022: The Edition's Best Shows	Placed	
The West Australian	2023	The Defining Moments of 2023	9	
Yardbarker	2025	The 20 Most Memorable Music Moments of 2025 (Coldplaygate)	12	

=== Venue records ===
Key
†	Indicates a former venue record

List of venue records
Year	Dates	Venue	Region	Description	Ref.
2022	18–19 March	Estadio Nacional de Costa Rica	Costa Rica	First act to perform two sold-out shows on a single tour	
2022	18–19 March	Estadio Nacional de Costa Rica	Costa Rica	Highest attendance (86,199) †	
2022	25–26 March	Estadio BBVA	Mexico	First act to perform two sold-out shows on a single tour	
2022	25–26 March	Estadio BBVA	Mexico	Highest attendance (112,262)	
2022	29–30 March	Estadio Akron	Mexico	First act to perform two sold-out shows on a single tour	
2022	29–30 March	Estadio Akron	Mexico	Highest attendance (90,153)	
2022	3–7 April	Foro Sol	Mexico	First act to perform four shows on a single tour in the 21st century	
2022	3–7 April	Foro Sol	Mexico	Highest attendance for an English-speaking act (259,591)	
2022	10–13 July	Olympiastadion	Germany	First act to perform three shows on a single tour	
2022	10–13 July	Olympiastadion	Germany	Highest attendance (216,535)	
2022	16–20 July	Stade de France	France	Fastest ticket sales ever in France (over 200,000 in a day)	
2022	16–20 July	Stade de France	France	First act to sell over 300,000 tickets on a single tour	
2022	16–20 July	Stade de France	France	First act to perform four shows on a single tour	
2022	16–20 July	Stade de France	France	Highest attendance (318,331)	
2022	16–20 July	Stade de France	France	Most career performances by a group (8 shows)	
2022	5–9 August	King Baudouin Stadium	Belgium	Fastest ticket sales ever in Belgium (over 150,000 in a day)	
2022	5–9 August	King Baudouin Stadium	Belgium	First act to sell over 200,000 tickets on a single tour	
2022	5–9 August	King Baudouin Stadium	Belgium	First act to perform three and four shows on a single tour	
2022	5–9 August	King Baudouin Stadium	Belgium	Highest attendance (224,719)	
2022	5–9 August	King Baudouin Stadium	Belgium	Most tickets sold for a single tour in Belgian history (224,719)	
2022	10 September	Barra Olympic Park	Brazil	Fastest ticket sales for a group at Rock in Rio	
2022	13–14 September	Estadio Nacional del Perú	Peru	First English-speaking act to perform two sold-out shows on a single tour	
2022	13–14 September	Estadio Nacional del Perú	Peru	Highest attendance for an English-speaking act (85,845)	
2022	16–17 September	Estadio El Campín	Colombia	First act to perform two sold-out shows on a single tour	
2022	16–17 September	Estadio El Campín	Colombia	Highest attendance (89,825)	
2022	20–24 September	Estadio Nacional de Chile	Chile	First act to perform three and four shows on a single tour	
2022	20–24 September	Estadio Nacional de Chile	Chile	Highest attendance (256,916)	
2022	25 October – 8 November	Estadio River Plate	Argentina	First act to perform 10 shows on a single tour	
2022	25 October – 8 November	Estadio River Plate	Argentina	Highest attendance in global history (626,841) †	
2022	25 October – 8 November	Estadio River Plate	Argentina	Highest gross in South American history ($49.7 million)	
2023	10–18 March	Estádio do Morumbi	Brazil	First act to perform five and six shows on a single tour	
2023	10–18 March	Estádio do Morumbi	Brazil	Highest attendance (439,651)	
2023	10–18 March	Estádio do Morumbi	Brazil	Highest gross in Brazilian history ($40.1 million) †	
2023	21–22 March	Estádio Couto Pereira	Brazil	First act to perform two shows on a single tour	
2023	21–22 March	Estádio Couto Pereira	Brazil	Highest attendance (85,776)	
2023	25–28 March	Estádio Olímpico Nilton Santos	Brazil	First act to perform three shows on a single tour	
2023	25–28 March	Estádio Olímpico Nilton Santos	Brazil	Highest attendance (211,012)	
2023	17–21 May	Estádio Cidade de Coimbra	Portugal	Fastest ticket sales ever in Portugal (over 200,000 in a day)	
2023	17–21 May	Estádio Cidade de Coimbra	Portugal	First act to sell over 200,000 tickets on a single tour	
2023	17–21 May	Estádio Cidade de Coimbra	Portugal	First act to perform three and four shows on a single tour	
2023	17–21 May	Estádio Cidade de Coimbra	Portugal	Highest attendance (208,284)	
2023	17–21 May	Estádio Cidade de Coimbra	Portugal	Most tickets sold for a single tour in Portuguese history (208,284)	
2023	24–28 May	Estadi Olímpic Lluís Companys	Spain	Fastest ticket sales ever in Spain (over 200,000 in a day) †	
2023	24–28 May	Estadi Olímpic Lluís Companys	Spain	First act to perform three and four shows on a single tour	
2023	24–28 May	Estadi Olímpic Lluís Companys	Spain	Highest attendance (224,761)	
2023	21–22 June	Stadio Diego Armando Maradona	Italy	Fastest ticket sales ever in Naples (over 86,000 in a day)	
2023	25–29 June	San Siro	Italy	Fastest ticket sales ever in Italy (over 240,000 in a day)	
2023	25–29 June	San Siro	Italy	First international act to perform three and four shows on a single tour	
2023	25–29 June	San Siro	Italy	Highest attendance for an international act (249,560)	
2023	8–12 July	Ullevi	Sweden	First international act to perform four shows on a single tour	
2023	8–12 July	Ullevi	Sweden	Highest attendance for an international act (267,180)	
2023	15–19 July	Johan Cruyff Arena	Netherlands	First group to perform four shows on a single tour in the 21st century	
2023	15–19 July	Johan Cruyff Arena	Netherlands	Highest attendance for a group in the 21st century (217,609)	
2023	27–28 September	Snapdragon Stadium	United States	First act to perform two shows on a single tour	
2023	27–28 September	Snapdragon Stadium	United States	Highest attendance (64,130)	
2023	30 September – 1 October	Rose Bowl	United States	Most career performances by a group (5 shows)	
2023	11–12 November	Kaohsiung National Stadium	Taiwan	Fastest ticket sales ever in Taiwan (over 100,000 in a day)	
2023	11–12 November	Kaohsiung National Stadium	Taiwan	First English-speaking act to perform two shows on a single tour	
2023	11–12 November	Kaohsiung National Stadium	Taiwan	Highest attendance for an English-speaking act (102,949)	
2023	15 November	Gelora Bung Karno Stadium	Indonesia	Biggest queue in Indonesian history (over 1.7 million users)	
2023	15 November	Gelora Bung Karno Stadium	Indonesia	Highest single-day gross in Asian history ($13.9 million)	
2023	18–19 November	Optus Stadium	Australia	Biggest queue in Australian history (over 365,000 users) †	
2023	18–19 November	Optus Stadium	Australia	First group to perform two shows on a single tour	
2023	18–19 November	Optus Stadium	Australia	Highest attendance (125,035)	
2023	22 November	Bukit Jalil National Stadium	Malaysia	Biggest queue in Malaysian history (over 400,000 users)	
2023	22 November	Bukit Jalil National Stadium	Malaysia	Highest attendance (81,387)	
2024	19–20 January	Philippine Arena	Philippines	First English-speaking group to perform two shows on a single tour	
2024	19–20 January	Philippine Arena	Philippines	Highest attendance (96,079)	
2024	23–31 January	Singapore National Stadium	Singapore	Fastest ticket sales ever in Singapore (over 200,000 in a day)	
2024	23–31 January	Singapore National Stadium	Singapore	First act to perform three, four, five and six shows on a single tour	
2024	23–31 January	Singapore National Stadium	Singapore	Highest attendance (321,113) †	
2024	3–4 February	Rajamangala Stadium	Thailand	First English-speaking act to perform two shows on a single tour	
2024	3–4 February	Rajamangala Stadium	Thailand	Highest attendance for an English-speaking act (106,027)	
2024	8–9 June	Olympic Stadium	Greece	Fastest ticket sales ever in Greece (over 130,000 in a day)	
2024	8–9 June	Olympic Stadium	Greece	First international act to perform two shows on a single tour	
2024	8–9 June	Olympic Stadium	Greece	Highest attendance for an international act (139,459)	
2024	12–13 June	Arena Națională	Romania	Biggest queue in Romanian history (over 100,000 users)	
2024	12–13 June	Arena Națională	Romania	Fastest ticket sales ever in Romania (over 100,000 in a day)	
2024	12–13 June	Arena Națională	Romania	First act to perform two shows on a single tour	
2024	12–13 June	Arena Națională	Romania	Highest attendance (105,420)	
2024	16–19 June	Puskás Aréna	Hungary	First group to perform three shows on a single tour	
2024	16–19 June	Puskás Aréna	Hungary	Highest attendance (166,771)	
2024	22–25 June	Groupama Stadium	France	First group to perform three shows on a single tour	
2024	22–25 June	Groupama Stadium	France	Highest attendance (164,641)	
2024	22–25 June	Groupama Stadium	France	Most tickets sold for a single tour in French history (482,972) (Note: Record broken at Stade de France (318,331) and extended at Groupama Stadium (482,972).)	
2024	29 June	Worthy Farm	England	Most headline performances at Glastonbury Festival (5 shows)	
2024	12–16 July	Stadio Olimpico	Italy	Fastest ticket sales ever in Rome (over 240,000 in a day)	
2024	12–16 July	Stadio Olimpico	Italy	First international act to perform three and four shows on a single tour	
2024	12–16 July	Stadio Olimpico	Italy	Highest attendance for an international act (251,771)	
2024	20–23 July	Merkur Spiel-Arena	Germany	First act to perform three shows on a single tour	
2024	20–23 July	Merkur Spiel-Arena	Germany	Highest attendance (145,402)	
2024	27–31 July	Helsinki Olympic Stadium	Finland	First act to perform three and four shows on a single tour	
2024	27–31 July	Helsinki Olympic Stadium	Finland	Highest attendance (178,033)	
2024	27–31 July	Helsinki Olympic Stadium	Finland	Most tickets sold for a single tour in Finnish history (178,033)	
2024	15–18 August	Olympiastadion	Germany	First international group to perform three shows on a single tour	
2024	15–18 August	Olympiastadion	Germany	Highest attendance for an international act (210,192)	
2024	21–25 August	Ernst-Happel-Stadion	Austria	First act to perform three and four shows on a single tour	
2024	21–25 August	Ernst-Happel-Stadion	Austria	Highest attendance (251,399)	
2024	29 August – 2 September	Croke Park	Ireland	Fastest ticket sales ever in Ireland (over 320,000 in a day)	
2024	29 August – 2 September	Croke Park	Ireland	First group to perform four shows on a single tour	
2024	29 August – 2 September	Croke Park	Ireland	Highest attendance for a group (329,200)	
2024	30 October – 3 November	Marvel Stadium	Australia	First group to perform four shows on a single tour	
2024	30 October – 3 November	Marvel Stadium	Australia	Highest attendance for a group (229,120)	
2024	6–10 November	Accor Stadium	Australia	First group to perform four shows on a single tour	
2024	6–10 November	Accor Stadium	Australia	Highest attendance (325,072)	
2024	13–16 November	Eden Park	New Zealand	First act to perform three shows on a single tour	
2024	13–16 November	Eden Park	New Zealand	Highest attendance (169,079)	
2025	9–14 January	Zayed Sports City Stadium	United Arab Emirates	First act to perform two, three and four shows on a single tour	
2025	9–14 January	Zayed Sports City Stadium	United Arab Emirates	Highest attendance (203,160)	
2025	9–14 January	Zayed Sports City Stadium	United Arab Emirates	Most tickets sold for a single tour in Emirati history (203,160)	
2025	18–21 January	DY Patil Stadium	India	Fastest ticket sales ever in Mumbai (over 150,000 in a day)	
2025	18–21 January	DY Patil Stadium	India	First act to perform two and three shows on a single tour	
2025	18–21 January	DY Patil Stadium	India	Highest attendance (163,711)	
2025	25–26 January	Narendra Modi Stadium	India	Fastest ticket sales ever in India (over 200,000 in a day)	
2025	25–26 January	Narendra Modi Stadium	India	First act to perform two shows on a single tour	
2025	25–26 January	Narendra Modi Stadium	India	Highest single-day attendance in Asian history (111,989) (Note: Record broken on 25 January (111,581) and extended on 26 January (111,989).)	
2025	25–26 January	Narendra Modi Stadium	India	Highest single-day attendance for a stadium in the 21st century (111,989) †	
2025	25–26 January	Narendra Modi Stadium	India	Highest attendance (223,570)	
2025	8–12 April	Kai Tak Sports Park	Hong Kong	Fastest ticket sales ever in Hong Kong (over 130,000 in a day)	
2025	8–12 April	Kai Tak Sports Park	Hong Kong	First act to perform one, two, three and four shows on a single tour	
2025	8–12 April	Kai Tak Sports Park	Hong Kong	Highest attendance (183,980)	
2025	8–12 April	Kai Tak Sports Park	Hong Kong	Highest gross in Hong Kong history ($32.9 million)	
2025	16–25 April	Goyang Stadium	South Korea	Fastest ticket sales ever in South Korea (over 300,000 in a day)	
2025	16–25 April	Goyang Stadium	South Korea	First act to perform three, four, five and six shows on a single tour	
2025	16–25 April	Goyang Stadium	South Korea	Highest attendance (318,309)	
2025	16–25 April	Goyang Stadium	South Korea	Most tickets sold for a single tour in South Korean history (318,309)	
2025	16–25 April	Goyang Stadium	South Korea	Highest gross in South Korean history ($34.4 million)	
2025	31 May – 1 June	Stanford Stadium	United States	First act to perform one and two shows on a single tour	
2025	31 May – 1 June	Stanford Stadium	United States	Highest attendance (87,068)	
2025	13–14 June	Sun Bowl	United States	First act to perform two shows on a single tour	
2025	13–14 June	Sun Bowl	United States	Highest attendance (93,816)	
2025	7–12 July	Rogers Stadium	Canada	First act to perform two, three and four shows on a single tour	
2025	7–12 July	Rogers Stadium	Canada	Highest attendance (207,412)	
2025	19 July	Camp Randall Stadium	United States	First group to perform a show in the 21st century	
2025	26–27 July	Hard Rock Stadium	United States	First group to perform two shows on a single tour	
2025	26–27 July	Hard Rock Stadium	United States	Highest attendance for a group (98,481)	
2025	18–19 August	Craven Park	England	First act to perform two shows on a single tour	
2025	18–19 August	Craven Park	England	Highest attendance (46,000)	
2025	22 August – 8 September	Wembley Stadium	England	First act to perform 9 to 16 shows on a single tour	
2025	22 August – 8 September	Wembley Stadium	England	Most performances in a single year (10 shows) †	
2025	22 August – 8 September	Wembley Stadium	England	Highest attendance in global history (791,000)	
2025	22 August – 8 September	Wembley Stadium	England	Highest gross in global history ($131.3 million)	
2025	22 August – 8 September	Wembley Stadium	England	Highest average gross in British history ($13.1 million)	
2025	22 August – 8 September	Wembley Stadium	England	Most career performances (22 shows)	
