= UPN44 =

UPN44 may refer to one of the following television stations in the United States formerly affiliated with UPN:

- WTOG, St. Petersburg/Tampa, Florida, now independent
- KPYX, San Francisco, California, now independent
- Miami Valley Channel, Dayton, Ohio, a now-defunct cable-only station operated by CBS affiliate WHIO-TV
