= UPN 17 =

UPN 17 may refer to one of the following television stations in the United States formerly affiliated with UPN:

- KLAF-LD, Lafayette, Louisiana, now affiliated with NBC
- The Miami Valley Channel, Dayton, Ohio, a now-defunct cable-only station operated by CBS affiliate WHIO-TV
