= XHUDG =

XHUDG may refer to either of two stations owned by the Universidad de Guadalajara and broadcasting to Guadalajara, Jalisco:

- XHUDG-FM, 104.3 FM radio
- XHUDG-TDT, television channel 44
