= Channel 17 TV stations in Mexico =

List of digital channels

The following television stations broadcast on digital channel 17 in Mexico:

- XEFE-TDT in Nuevo Laredo, Tamaulipas
- XHAH-TDT on Cerro de las Lajas, Veracruz
- XHAPT-TDT in Agua Prieta, Sonora
- XHBQ-TDT in Zacatecas, Zacatecas
- XHCBO-TDT in Caborca, Sonora
- XHCC-TDT in Colima, Colima
- XHCCG-TDT in Celaya, Guanajuato
- XHCTME-TDT in Mexicali, Baja California
- XHDUH-TDT in Durango, Durango
- XHENJ-TDT in Ensenada, Baja California
- XHFN-TDT in Monterrey, Nuevo León
- XHGO-TDT in Tampico, Tamaulipas
- XHNOS-TDT in Nogales, Sonora
- XHPBSA-TDT in Saltillo, Coahuila
- XHSNC-TDT in San Cristóbal de las Casas, Chiapas
- XHSQP-TDT in Sinoquipe, Sonora
