= Channel 17 TV stations in Canada =

The following television stations broadcast on digital or analog channel 17 in Canada:

- CFCM-DT in Quebec City, Quebec
- CFTF-DT-2 in Trois-Pistoles, Quebec
- CIII-DT in Paris, Ontario
- CITY-DT-3 in Ottawa, Ontario
- CIVI-DT-2 in Vancouver, British Columbia
- CJIL-DT in Lethbridge, Alberta
- CKEM-DT in Edmonton, Alberta
