= Xyloband =

Wristbands containing LEDs

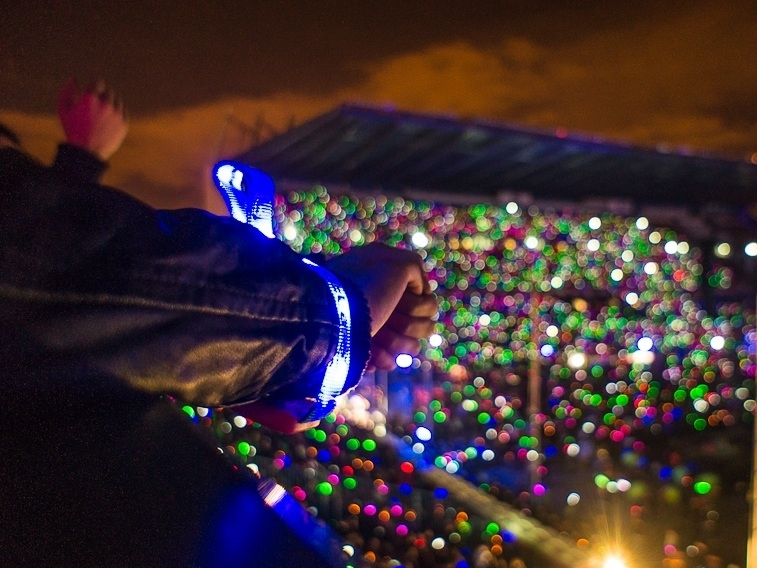
- Xylobands in the Mylo Xyloto Tour, 2012
- Type: Wristband
- Inventor: Jason Regler
- Inception: 2011
- Manufacturer: RB Concepts, Ltd.
- Available: Yes
- Website: xylobands.com

A Xyloband is a wristband that contains light-emitting diodes and a radio frequency receiver. Used primarily in the live entertainment industry, it was launched by RB Concepts Ltd, a company set up by entrepreneur Clive Banks with inventor Jason Regler. The lights inside the wristband can be controlled by a software program, which sends signals to the wristband, instructing it to light up or blink, for example. The single colour version is available in green, blue, yellow, red, pink, and white.

The first use of Xylobands on a large scale was on British rock band Coldplay's 2011 Mylo Xyloto Tour. A Xyloband was given to each member of the audience, and as the concert played, the flashing of the wristbands was synchronized to the music. Regler stated that he had the idea for the product during a Coldplay concert, when they performed "Fix You". Regler and the band have an agreement which governs the design trademark on the wristbands, the patent, and the intellectual property rights to the Xylobands.

== Technology ==
The wristbands themselves are constructed of a thick fabric or biodegradable plastic with LEDs inside the material. A radio receiver is located within a plastic case on the band, and it receives wireless signals from a controller. These signals are sent either by a handheld TV remote styled controller, which has a range of 250 meters, or a controller which is hosted on a laptop computer linked to a radio transmitter, which can remotely control the wristbands from up to 300 meters away. The operator of the controller or laptop software may program all wristbands or only those of certain colors to flash on and off at specific intervals and specific moments. The wristbands are not intended to be lit outside of the concert venue and have a low battery life (newer models can however have their batteries charged for reuse), although there exist anecdotes of Xylobands "coming back to life" at seemingly random times.

== Uses ==
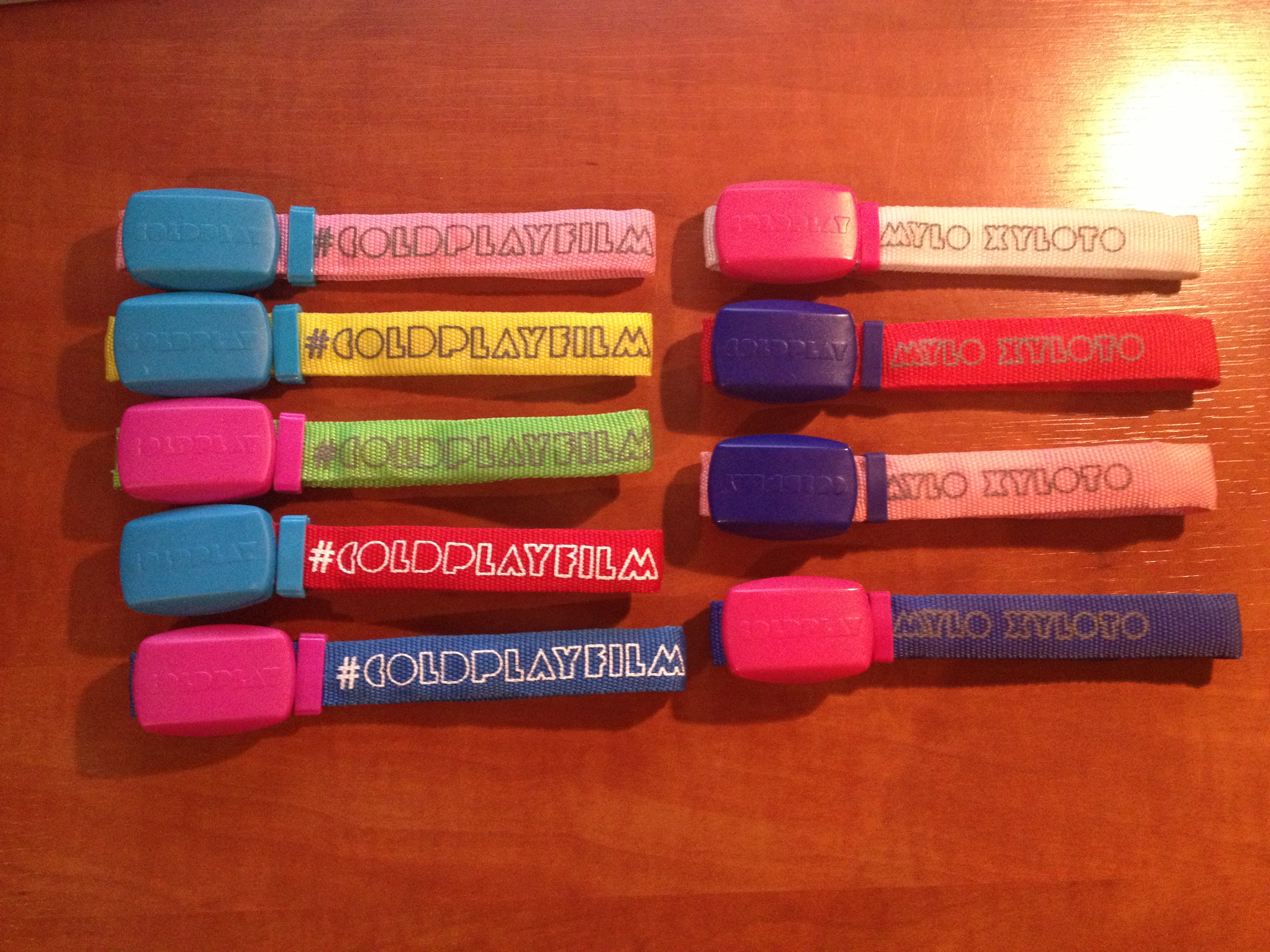
A collection of Xylobands, as they appeared during the Mylo Xyloto Tour.

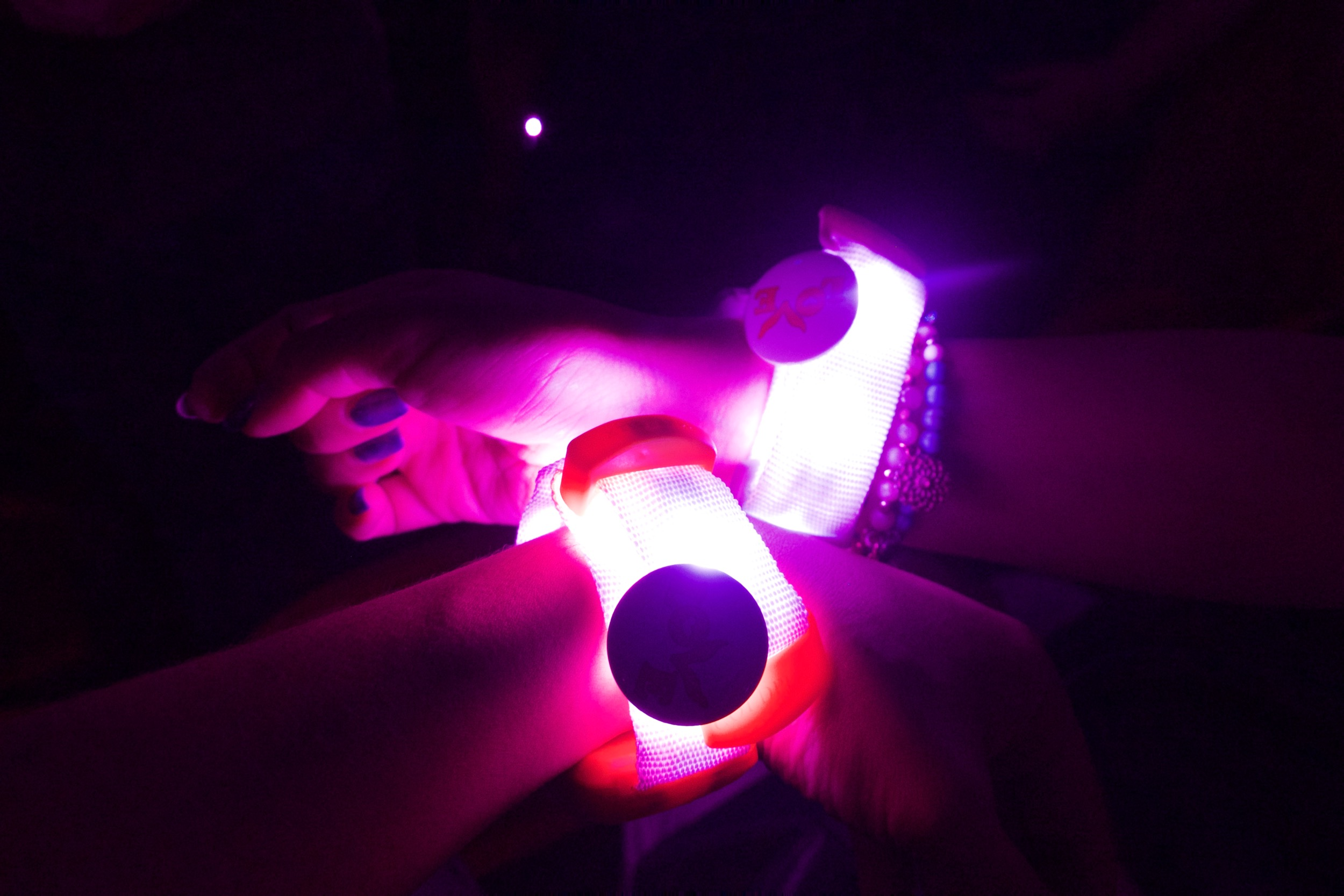
Coldplay's second version of the Xylobands, in use during a concert on the A Head Full of Dreams Tour.

=== Mylo Xyloto Tour ===
The wristbands were given to each audience member at Coldplay's 2012 Mylo Xyloto Tour. Bassist Guy Berryman explained during the Live 2012 documentary film that there were initial troubles in properly implementing the wristbands during production rehearsals prior to being introduced at concerts, but were eventually successful for use in the tour. As the music played, the wristbands flashed with the music to create a colorful light show in the audience, which the Washington Post referred to as a "psychedelicatessen of moving, multicolored lights.". It was wrongly reported that Xylobands were costing the band approximately €490,000 per concert. Xylobands were also prominently featured in Coldplay's "Charlie Brown" music video.

=== A Head Full of Dreams Tour ===
The band continued their partnership with Jason Regler for the A Head Full of Dreams Tour. They were also present during Coldplay's headline performance on the Pyramid Stage at Glastonbury Festival 2016.

=== Music of the Spheres World Tour ===
In line with Coldplay's goals of lowering their carbon emissions and increasing sustainability across their events since their previous world tour, Xylobands were given an overhaul for their Music of the Spheres World Tour. This edition features bracelets that are made of compostable plant-based plastic sourced from sugarcane, with white being the only color. LED's are embedded in the middle of the wristband and within small plastic circles on the plastic straps, the latter of which also act as an adjuster. Attendees are given one bracelet at entry to the venue and are encouraged to return them at the conclusion of the concert in order to be sanitized, recharged, and reused at future venues. In the leadup to the beginning of each concert, statistics are at times shown to attendees on the stage screens, displaying which city returned the greatest percentage of their wristbands. In the first year of the tour, attendees returned an average of 86% of all wristbands distributed, with the attendees in Seoul being the highest at 99% in 2025.

=== Outside of Coldplay ===
Various organizations have used Xylobands in order to promote special events and products since their inception.

- Many professional sports teams in the NHL and NBA have used Xylobands in the past for performances during matches.
- Jay Z utilized Xylobands for a concert in Abu Dhabi on 1 November 2013. Audience members began throwing their lit wristbands into the air during a performance of Empire State of Mind, which, although unintended, created a display similar to fireworks.
- The Cancer Research UK 2016 Shine Walk gave away Xylobands to its entrants, with the fundraising walk being a half or full marathon through the streets of London overnight. The wristbands fit with the theme of the event, which was to "shine" by wearing LEDs, EL wire, glow sticks, etc. They were plain white and were set to light up at strategic points, such as mile markers, pit stops and other important points.
- in 2016, Arsenal F.C distributed Xylobands to supporters when debuting their 2016 kit during a live broadcast.

== Gallery ==
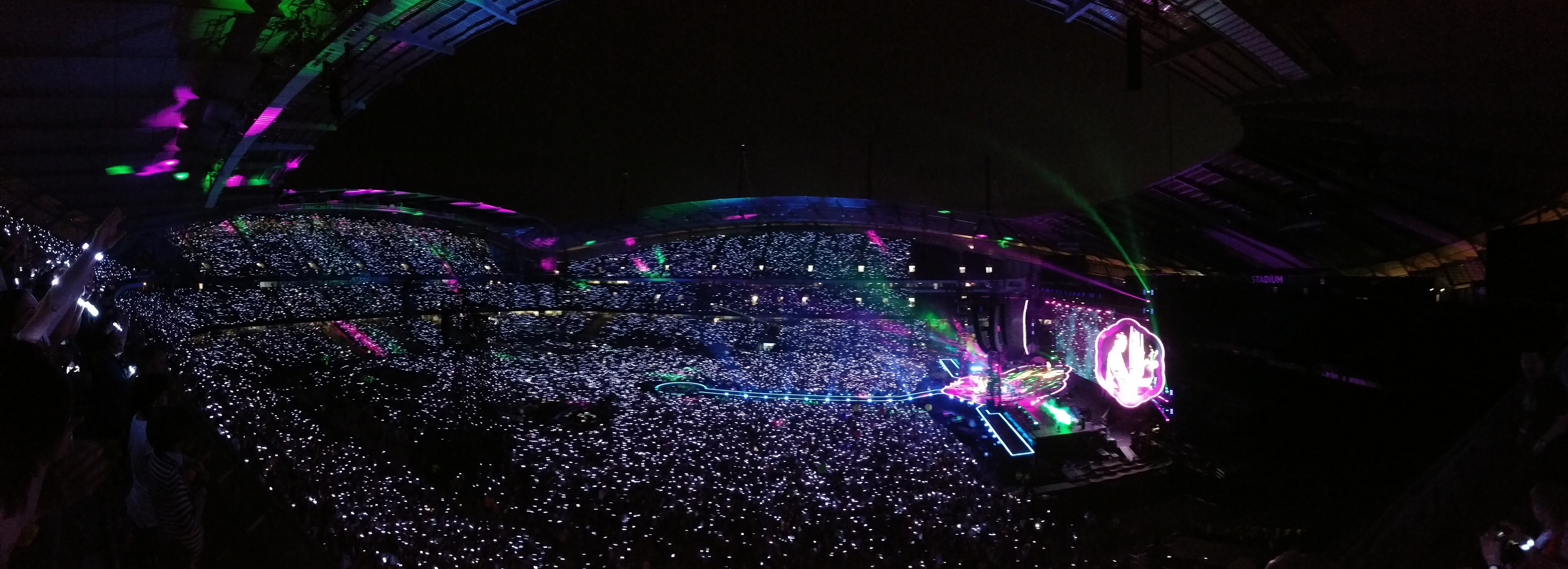
Panoramic view of Etihad Stadium, during a concert on Coldplay's A Head Full of Dreams Tour.
Many Xylobands, emitting white light during a performance of "A Sky Full of Stars", can be seen throughout the audience.

== See also ==
- PixMob
