= Channel 44 TV stations in Canada =

The following television stations broadcast on digital or analog channel 44 in Canada:

- CFTF-DT-11 in Carleton-sur-Mer, Quebec
- CHNB-DT-1 in Fredericton, New Brunswick
- CICO-DT-92 in Cloyne, Ontario
- CITY-DT in Toronto, Ontario
- CJEO-DT in Edmonton, Alberta
