= Channel 44 low-power TV stations in the United States =

The following low-power television stations, which are no longer licensed, formerly broadcast on digital or analog channel 44 in the United States:

- K44AK-D in Memphis, Texas
- K44AM in Carlin, Nevada
- K44CC-D in Gruver, Texas
- K44CG-D in Capulin, etc., New Mexico
- K44CK in Chelan, Washington
- K44CP in Eureka, Nevada
- K44DD in Chama, New Mexico
- K44DF in Glenwood Springs, Colorado
- K44DN in Paso Robles, California
- K44DZ in Klamath Falls, Oregon
- K44EK in Fairbanks, Alaska
- K44EL in Ouray, Utah
- K44FH-D in Coos Bay, Oregon
- K44GD in Crownpoint, New Mexico
- K44GG in Murdo, South Dakota
- K44HA-D in Preston, Idaho
- K44HH in Lubbock, Texas
- K44HJ in Socorro, New Mexico
- K44KR-D in Salinas, California
- K44LG-D in Anderson, Pineville, Missouri
- K44LL-D in Austin, Nevada
- KIDT-LD in Stamford, Texas
- KINE-LP in Robstown, Texas
- KTJH-LP in Ukiah, California
- W44BO in Pinconning, Michigan
- W44CN in Greenville, North Carolina
- W44CT-D in Albany, New York
- W44CU-D in Florence, South Carolina
- W44CV-D in Utuado, Puerto Rico
- W44DK-D in Clarksburg, West Virginia
- WBXP-CA in Memphis, Tennessee
- WCRD-LP in Carthage, Illinois
- WLPH-CD in Miami, Florida
- WNDS-LD in Ocala, Florida
