= Channel 44 digital TV stations in the United States =

The following television stations, which are no longer licensed, formerly broadcast on digital channel 44 in the United States:

- K44AK-D in Memphis, Texas
- K44CC-D in Gruver, Texas
- K44CG-D in Capulin, etc., New Mexico
- K44FH-D in Coos Bay, Oregon
- K44HA-D in Preston, Idaho
- K44KR-D in Salinas, California
- K44LG-D in Anderson/Pineville, Missouri
- K44LL-D in Austin, Nevada
- KIDT-LD in Stamford, Texas
- W44CT-D in Albany, New York
- W44CU-D in Florence, South Carolina
- W44CV-D in Utuado, Puerto Rico
- W44DK-D in Clarksburg, West Virginia
- WLPH-CD in Miami, Florida
- WNDS-LD in Ocala, Florida
- WNYS-TV in Syracuse, New York
