= Miami Valley Channel =

Cable television channel in Dayton, Ohio (1994–2006)

Miami Valley Channel (MVC)
- Country: United States
- Broadcast area: Miami Valley area of Ohio
- Network: UPN (1998–2006); Pax/i (secondary, 2001–2006)
- Headquarters: Dayton, Ohio

Ownership
- Owner: Cox Media Group
- Sister channels: WHIO-TV

History
- Launched: September 19, 1994
- Closed: December 31, 2006
- Former names: Miami Valley Channel (1994–2001, late 2006); UPN 44 (2001–2004); UPN 17 (2004–late 2006)

The Miami Valley Channel (MVC), known at various times as UPN 44 and UPN 17, was a local cable television channel based in Dayton, Ohio. MVC launched in September 1994 and ceased operations at the end of 2006. Owned and operated by Cox Media Group, through its local CBS affiliate, WHIO-TV, the channel was available in the Miami Valley area of Ohio on Time Warner Cable (TWC) and TWC's predecessor companies.

The station was the Dayton area's UPN affiliate from October 1998 until the network ceased operations in September 2006.

== History ==
=== Early years ===
In 1993 and 1994, as part of retransmission negotiations with Viacom Cable and with Continental Cablevision (both of which were ultimately succeeded by Time Warner Cable), WHIO-TV sought an additional cable channel. An agreement was reached with Continental on July 8, 1994, and expectations had been that WHIO-TV would launch an all-news channel, as its Pittsburgh sister station, WPXI, had done in January of that year. Instead, WHIO-TV general manager David Lippoff said that MVC would be a full-service channel, programmed like an independent station, with syndicated game shows, children's programs, dramas, movies, sports and talk shows. In addition, WHIO-TV's noon, 6 p.m. and 11 p.m. newscasts would be repeated on MVC at 12:30, 6:30 and 11:35 p.m., seven days a week.

Original logo for the Miami Valley Channel

MVC launched on September 19, 1994, as a joint venture among Continental, Viacom and WHIO-TV, appearing on channel 44 on both companies' systems. (The channel did not actually appear on Viacom's system until January 1, 1995.)

On January 16, 1995, MVC launched a 30-minute 9 p.m. weeknight news show, MVC First News at 9. This was Dayton's first prime time local television newscast. The program originated from WHIO-TV's news set, used anchors and other on-air staff from WHIO-TV, and included recorded stories and news clips from WHIO-TV. However, the newscast used distinct MVC/"Miami Valley Channel" branding and graphics, with little to no visual reference to WHIO-TV, Channel 7, or the NewsCenter 7 brand. On September 23, 1996, in an effort to boost viewership, this newscast was moved to 10 p.m. and renamed First News at 10.

=== UPN affiliation ===
Since its launch in January 1995, UPN had been carried locally as a secondary affiliate by primary Fox affiliate WRGT-TV. As a secondary affiliate, it would have been normal for WRGT-TV to air UPN's programs "out of pattern" (that is, on days and in time slots other than those provided by the network). Outside of Star Trek: Voyager, WRGT-TV relegated the remainder of the network's schedule to undesirable time slots: first weekend afternoons, then the very early morning.

MVC gained primary UPN affiliation in the fall of 1998, airing its first programs on October 5, the beginning of the network's 1998–99 season. The station was initially promoted as "UPN on MVC".

At some point between April 1998 and October 1999, MVC adopted the "NewsCenter 7" brand for its 10 p.m. newscast, now calling it NewsCenter 7 First News at Ten.

=== UPN 44 ===
UPN 44 logo. The "broken" 4s resemble the "broken 7" then used in WHIO-TV's logo.

At some point between April and June of 2001, MVC was renamed UPN 44, after its network and cable channel.

Beginning in the fall of 2001, UPN 44 aired Pax programming in some day parts; although WBDT had a secondary Pax affiliation at the time, UPN 44 aired Pax shows that were not cleared on WBDT, such as the 2002 revival of Beat the Clock and Shop 'til You Drop. By December 2002, at the latest, UPN 44 was no longer airing repeats of WHIO-TV's newscasts.

=== UPN 17 ===
The station logo for UPN 17 (above); sometimes the UPN 17-6 logo was used (below). The "broken" digits are modeled on the "broken 7" then used in WHIO-TV's logo.

On June 1, 2004, Time Warner Cable moved UPN 44 to channel 17 for the majority of Time Warner's Montgomery and Greene County subscribers. The station was then renamed "UPN 17". On July 1, Time Warner moved UPN 44 to channel 6 for its remaining subscribers in the Miami Valley receiving the channel. These channel moves were done at WHIO-TV's request, to position the station closer to the Dayton-area broadcast channels on Time Warner's cable lineups.

In mid-June 2004, it was announced that the 10 p.m. newscast would be renamed NewsCenter 7 at 10, dropping the First News branding used since 1995. WHIO-TV touted this as an "improved newscast", naming one of its most experienced newscasters, Donna Jordan, as anchor, and featuring chief meteorologist Jamie Simpson and sports director Mike Hartsock on the program.

After WBDT dropped Pax in 2004, the network's programming moved to UPN 17.

=== Shutdown ===
In early 2006, UPN was preparing to merge with The WB to form The CW. Both UPN 17 and the Miami Valley's WB affiliate, WBDT, sought affiliation with the new network, though WBDT's ownership, which featured executive connections with the WB via their ownership group at the time, made WBDT's pursuit of affiliation with The CW a mere formality.

At the time, UPN 17's programming included NewsCenter 7 at 10, Big Ten football, Ohio State basketball, and such syndicated programs as Judge Hatchett, Cops, The Nanny, Mad About You and Magnum, P.I.

Around March 14, 2006, it was announced that The CW would air on WBDT. WHIO-TV's general manager, Harry Delaney, was quoted as saying, "Another new network, MyNetworkTV, is being developed by Fox. As a Fox product, My Network TV will appeal to a broader audience and is a viable option for us."

On July 26, 2006, it was announced by WHIO-TV that Time Warner Cable would no longer carry UPN 17 after December 31. After not getting the CW affiliation, the station attempted to affiliate with MyNetworkTV. While WHIO-TV was negotiating with the new networks, it was also trying to renew UPN 17's carriage agreement with TWC, to convince one of the networks to affiliate with the station. TWC declined WHIO-TV's offer.

In spite of the timing of UPN 17's shutdown, MyNetworkTV did not reach a Dayton affiliation agreement until August 24, 2006. MyNetworkTV would air on a digital subchannel of WRGT-TV, WRGT-DT2 (45.2).

On September 16, 2006 (the day after UPN went off the air), UPN 17 changed its name back to the Miami Valley Channel. It did not reuse the logo from its prior incarnation of the name, or develop any new logos or graphics for the brief time the channel would be in existence. MVC still aired its regular daytime programming, including The Greg Behrendt Show, Dr. Phil and selected shows from the i network.

By coincidence, WHIO-TV and MVC anchor Donna Jordan announced on December 8, 2006, that she would be retiring on December 31.

After a 12-year run, the Miami Valley Channel was shut down at midnight on January 1, 2007, and was immediately dropped from Time Warner Cable's lineup. Viewers who tuned into MVC on January 1 saw a message from Time Warner Cable that stated, "The Miami Valley Channel (MVC) programming is no longer carried on Time Warner Cable. MVC was the former UPN network affiliate. UPN stopped broadcasting their signal in August of 2006 (sic) and MVC is no longer in operation as of December 31, 2006."

== See also ==
- Channel 17 (disambiguation)
- Channel 44 (disambiguation)
