= Canal 44 (Jalisco) =

University television network in Jalisco, Mexico

XHUDG-TDT
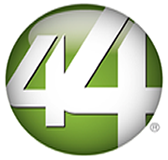
- Guadalajara, Jalisco; Mexico
- Channels: Digital: 27 (UHF); Virtual: 44
- Branding: Canal 44

Ownership
- Owner: University of Guadalajara; (Empresa Universitaria Televisión Abierta)

History
- Founded: January 27, 2010
- First air date: January 31, 2011
- Former call signs: XHUDG-TV (2011–2015); XHUDG-TDT (2015–2021); XHCPCT-TDT (2022)
- Call sign meaning: Universidad de Guadalajara

Technical information
- Licensing authority: CRT
- ERP: 205.5 kW
- HAAT: 321.8 m (1,056 ft)
- Transmitter coordinates: 20°36′03.01″N 103°21′50.65″W
- Repeater: See list

Links
- Website: www.udgtv.com

Canal 44 (Spanish: Channel 44, call sign XHUDG-TDT) is the television network of the Universidad de Guadalajara (UDG), a university in Jalisco, Mexico. Canal 44 broadcasts to the Guadalajara metropolitan area from a transmitter located on Cerro del Cuatro in Tlaquepaque, with additional transmitters in Ciudad Guzmán, Lagos de Moreno, and Puerto Vallarta. Canal 44 and the UDG's eight-station radio network form the Sistema Universitario de Radio y Televisión (University Radio and Television System).

== History ==
As early as 1991, UDG sought a permit to build a television station and was denied; instead, the permit was built out as Jalisco's state television system, XHGJG-TV channel 7 (known as C7). It tried two more times to obtain a permit, once in 1995 and again in 1997.

In 2001, UDG and Televisa signed an agreement under which UDG supplied some programs to be broadcast on Televisa's local channel 4, XHG-TV.

On January 27, 2010, Cofetel at last approved the award of a permit for a non-commercial television station to the University of Guadalajara to construct XHUDG-TV. The station went on the air on January 31, 2011, with a staff of 100. The University of Guadalajara thus became the sixth university in Mexico to sign on a television station.

Not long after, UDG applied for a digital companion channel for its station, and in November 2013, the first test transmissions of XHUDG-TDT (RF channel 46) were broadcast. On December 16, 2015, XHUDG, along with other television stations in Guadalajara, shut off its analog signal and went digital-only. This facility continues to operate, though a failure to renew the original concession led to a call sign change to XHCPCT-TDT with a new concession effective January 1, 2022.

Until December 31, 2016, the station had over-the-air coverage in Los Angeles as the second digital channel of KVMD (31.2). UDG also produces an international variant of XHUDG for worldwide distribution.

=== Expansion in Jalisco ===
In December 2016, the Federal Telecommunications Institute authorized new public concessions for television stations to the Universidad de Guadalajara, at Ciudad Guzmán (XHPBGZ-TDT, RF channel 11) and Lagos de Moreno (XHPBLM-TDT, RF channel 9). The Ciudad Guzmán transmitter, which is co-located with Jalisco TV on Cerro de la Escalera, entered program service on January 31, 2018. The Lagos de Moreno transmitter followed on September 19.

On November 5, 2018, the IFT approved a fourth transmitter, XHCPAF-TDT (RF channel 8), to serve Puerto Vallarta. It began broadcasting on February 25, 2020.

In 2022, the IFT reauthorized XHUDG-TDT (initially as XHCPCT-TDT, changed back in August 2022) after it failed to timely renew its existing concession. In 2024, the IFT authorized the consolidation of the existing transmitters under one call sign with a statutory coverage area of the state of Jalisco.

== Programming ==
XHUDG programming is primarily cultural and educational in nature. Many of the UDG-produced programs formerly seen on XHG under the Televisa contract moved to XHUDG, such as Claves, La Brújula and La Vagoneta. XHUDG has also rebroadcast programs produced by TV UNAM and by Canal 22, though those two channels are available full-time as subchannels of the SPR transmitter in Guadalajara.

The station produces local newscasts known as Señal Informativa, aired three times daily, at 7am, 1pm and 8pm. The newscast builds upon the existing radio news operation of XHUDG-FM.

Following the University club's relegation from the Liga MX to the Ascenso MX, XHUDG became the exclusive broadcaster of the "Leones Negros" home games since the Apertura 2015 tournament.

=== 44 Noticias ===
On March 13, 2017, UDG began transmissions of 44 Noticias on its 44.2 subchannel in Guadalajara. The new channel broadcasts from 6am to midnight and carries the existing Señal Informativa newscasts as well as additional news, political, cultural and sports shows and documentaries. It is the first local news channel in the city and the first news channel produced by an educational station in Mexico.

== Transmitters ==
Canal 44 transmitters
Location	Channel	ERP	HAAT	Transmitter coordinates	First air date
Lagos de Moreno	9 (VHF)	3.13 kW	74 m (243 ft)	21°21′23″N 101°57′01.90″W	
Ciudad Guzmán	11 (VHF)	5.52 kW	253 m (830 ft)	19°39′49″N 103°27′39″W	
Puerto Vallarta	8 (VHF)	6.64 kW	−393.6 m (−1,291 ft)	20°42′15.72″N 105°13′21.39″W	
Tlajomulco de Zúñiga	27 (UHF)	0.184 kW	2.5 m (8 ft)		
Chapala	27 (UHF)	0.266 kW	−73.9 m (−242 ft)		2020

The Tlajomulco and Chapala repeaters were authorized to fill a gap in service for some 400,000 people that are shielded from the main signal at Cerro del Cuatro. These transmitters were expected to be in service by early 2019, but the Chapala transmitter was not installed until 2020.

== Subchannels ==
The four Canal 44 transmitters in operation carry two subchannels:

Canal 44 subchannels
Channel	Res.	Aspect	Short name	Programming
44.1	1080i	16:9	UDG C44	Main XHUDG programming
44.2	480i	4:3	UDG TVU	44 Noticias

In March 2018, in order to facilitate the repacking of TV services out of the 600 MHz band (channels 38–51), XHUDG was assigned channel 27 for continued digital operations, relocating to the new channel in December 2018. Channel 27 had already been assigned for XHUDG's two repeaters.
